= List of Bhojpuri writers =

This is the list of people who have contributed to Bhojpuri literature.

Statue of Bhikhari Thakur

== A ==
- Acharya Shivpujan Sahay
- Aryadeva
- Avinash Chandra Vidyarthi

== B ==
- Baleshwar Yadav
- Beniram
- Bhikhari Thakur
- Bihari Lal Yadav
- Bisram
- Bulaki Das

== C ==
- Chauranginath

== D ==
- Dariya Saheb
- Dharamdas
- Dharikshan Mishr
- Dharni Das
- Dinesh Bhramar

== G ==
- Guru Gobind Singh
- Gorakhnath

== H ==
- Harihar Singh
- Heera Dom

== K ==
- Kabir Das
- Kina Ram
- Krishnadev Prasad Gaud
- Kukkuripa

== L ==
- Lachhimi Sakhi
- Lal Khadag Bahadur Malla
- Lawapa
- Luipa

== M ==
- Mahendar Misir
- Manoj Bhawuk
- Manoranjan Prasad Sinha
- Matsyendranath
- Moti BA

== N ==
- Neha Singh Rathore
- Nilotpal Mrinal

== P ==
- Parichay Das
- Prasiddha Narayan Singh

== R ==
- Raghuveer Narayan
- Rahul Sankrityayan
- Raj Mohan
- Ram Gharib Chaube
- Ramesh Chandra Jha
- Rameshwar Singh Kashyap
- Ravidas
- Rajendra Prasad Singh

== T ==
- Teg Ali Teg

== V ==
- Vimlanand Saraswati
- Viveki Rai
