= List of Bhojpuri people =

This article provides lists of famous and notable Bhojpuriya-sawb or Bhojpuri people in the Indian subcontinent and other countries like Suriname, Mauritius, Fiji, Guyana and people with Bhojpuri ancestry or people who speak Bhojpuri as their primary language.

== President ==
=== Presidents of India ===
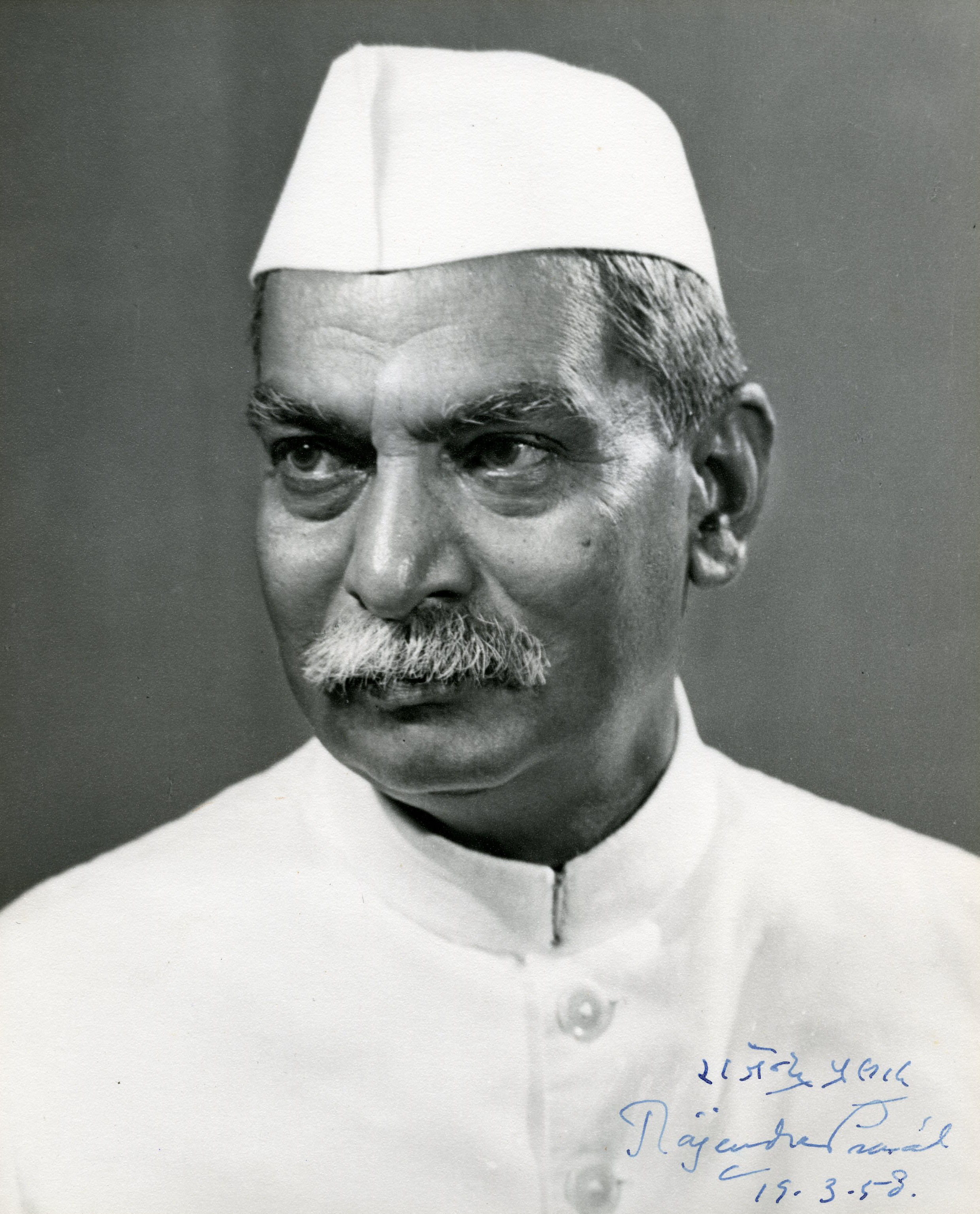
Rajendra Prasad, the first president of India

- Mohammad Hidayatullah, (20 July 1969 – 24 August 1969; 6 October 1982 – 31 October 1982), Acting President of India
- Rajendra Prasad, (26 January 1950 – 13 May 1962), 1st President of India. He was born in Ziradei, a village in Chhapra, Bihar. Chhapra is a Bhojpuri speaking district.

=== Presidents of Seychelles ===
- Wavel Ramkalawan, 5th President of Seychelles

=== Presidents of Mauritius ===
- Anerood Jugnauth, (7 October 2003 – 31 March 2012), 4th President of Mauritius
- Kailash Purryag, (21 July 2012 – 29 May 2015), 5th President of Mauritius

=== Presidents of Guyana ===
- Mohamed Irfaan Ali, (2 August 2020 – ), 10th President of Guyana
- Cheddi Jagan, (9 October 1992 – 6 March 1997), 4th President of Guyana
- Bharrat Jagdeo, (11 August 1999 – 3 December 2011), 7th President of Guyana
- Donald Ramotar, (3 December 2011 – 16 May 2015), 8th President of Guyana

=== Presidents of Suriname ===
- Fred Ramdat Misier, (8 February 1982 – 25 January 1988), 3rd President of Suriname
- Chan Santokhi, (16 July 2020 – ), 9th President of Suriname
- Ramsewak Shankar, (25 January 1988 – 24 December 1990), 4th President of Suriname

=== President of Trinidad and Tobago ===
- Noor Mohamed Hassanali, (20 March 1987 – 17 March 1997), 2nd President of Trinidad and Tobago

== Prime Ministers ==
=== Prime Ministers of India ===
- Lal Bahadur Shastri, (9 June 1964 – 11 January 1966), 2nd Prime Minister of India
- Chandra Shekhar Singh, (10 November 1990 – 21 June 1991), 8th Prime Minister of India

=== Prime Ministers of Mauritius ===
- Anerood Jugnauth, (17 December 2014 – 23 January 2017), 2nd Prime Minister of Mauritius
- Pravind Jugnauth, 5th Prime Minister of Mauritius
- Navin Ramgoolam, (5 July 2005 – 17 December 2014), 3rd Prime Minister of Mauritius
- Seewoosagur Ramgoolam, (12 March 1968 – 30 June 1982), 1st Prime Minister of Mauritius

=== Prime Minister of Suriname ===
- Pretaap Radhakishun, (17 July 1986 – 7 April 1987), 6th Prime Minister of Suriname

=== Prime Minister of Trinidad and Tobago ===
- Basdeo Panday, (9 November 1995 – 24 December 2001), 5th Prime Minister of Trinidad and Tobago
- Kamla Persad-Bissessar, (26 May 2010 – 9 September 2015), 6th Prime Minister of Trinidad and Tobago

== Chief Ministers ==
=== Chief Ministers of Bihar (India) ===
- Harihar Singh (1969-1969)
- Lalu Prasad Yadav (1990-1995)
- Rabri Devi (1997-2005)
- Daroga Prasad Rai (1970, for 10 months)
- Kedar Pandey (1972-1973)
- Abdul Ghafoor (1973-1975)
- Ram Sundar Das (1979-1980)
- Bindeshwari Dubey (1985-1988)

=== Chief Ministers of Uttar Pradesh (India) ===
- Sampurnanand (1954-1960)
- Kamlapati Tripathi (1969–70)

== Governor of Indian States ==
- Anant Sharma, (10 March 1983 – 14 August 1984), 11th governor of West Bengal
- Chandeshwar Prasad Narayan Singh, 18th governor of Uttar Pradesh and 2nd governor of Punjab.
- Kailashpati Mishra, (7 May 2003 – 2 Jul 2004), 15th Governor of Gujarat

== Politicians ==
=== Deputy Prime Ministers of India ===
- Jagjivan Ram, First Labour Minister of India, first Dalit Deputy PM of India and founder of All India Depressed Classes League & Congress (Jagjivan).

=== Deputy Chief Ministers ===
- Tejashwi Yadav, Bihar (2015-2017)
- Ram Jaipal Singh Yadav, Bihar (1971-1972)
- Renu Devi, Bihar (2020-2022)

=== Governors, Lt. Governors, Governors-General ===
- Lallan Prasad Singh, Governor of Assam (1973–80), Manipur (1973–80, 1982–83), Meghalaya (1973–80), Nagaland (1973–81), and Tripura (1973–80).
- Anand Satyanand, Governor-General of New Zealand (2006-2011)
- Ram Dulari Sinha, Governor of Kerala (1988-1990)
- Manoj Sinha, Lt. Governor of Jammu and Kashmir ( 2020–Present )

=== Lok Sabha Speakers ===
- Meira Kumar (2009-2014)
- Bali Ram Bhagat (1976-1977)

=== Cabinet Ministers ===
- Ram Subhag Singh

==== Council Ministers ====
- Pankaj Chaudhary
- Kamlesh Paswan

== National and International Award winners ==
=== Ashok Chakra ===
- Jyoti Prakash Nirala

=== Bharat Ratna ===
- Bismillah Khan
- Jayaprakash Narayan
- Rajendra Prasad

=== Magasaysay Award ===
- Jayaprakash Narayan
- Ravish Kumar

=== Padma Shree ===
- Narendra Kumar Pandey
- Ramchandra Manjhi

== Freedom Fighters ==
- Babu Amar Singh
- Indradeep Sinha
- Jayaprakash Narayan
- Kunwar Singh
- Mangal Pandey

== Journalists ==
- Amitava Kumar
- Anjana Om Kashyap, managing editor of Aaj Tak
- Ravish Kumar, former NDTV journalist
- George Orwell, born in Motihari
- Afroz Alam Sahil
- Upendra Rai, Chairman, M.D and Editor-in-Chief of Bharat Express
- Ram Bahadur Rai, former editor in Jansatta
- Shaukat Pardesi, poet writer & lyricist
- Vidya Niwas Mishra, Padma Bhushan awardee and journalist
- Zafar ul Islam Khan, editor in The Milli Gazette

== Scholars ==
- Ananda Prasad, biochemist
- Gupteshwar Pandey, former DGP of Bihar
- Kapil Muni Tiwary, linguist
- Sachchidananda Sinha, lawyer and parliamentarian

== Actors ==
Bhojpuri cinema

- Nazir Hussain, Bollywood actor and pioneer of Bhojpuri fim industry
- Dinesh Lal Yadav, Bhojpuri actor, singer and politician.
- Khesari Lal Yadav, Bhojpuri actor and singer
- Manoj Tiwari, former Bhojpuri actor, singer and politician
- Pawan Singh, Bhojpuri actor, singer and politician.

Hindi cinema

- Ravi Kishan, Hindi-Bhojpuri film actor and politician
- Kunal Singh, Bollywood-Bhojpuri actor
- Akhilendra Mishra, Hindi film & TV actor
- Abhimanyu Singh
- Vinay Pathak
- Siddhant Chaturvedi
- Manoj Bajpayee
- Pankaj Tripathi
- Satyakam Anand
- Sujit Kumar
- Vishal Aditya Singh

== Actresses ==
Bhojpuri cinema

== Singers ==
- Baleshwar Yadav, Bhojpuri folk singer
- Bihari Lal Yadav, founder of Biraha genre
- Chandan Tiwari, Bhojpuri singer
- Hiralal Yadav, birha and kajri
- Raj Mohan, Bhojpuri singer
- Ramdew Chaitoe, Bhojpuri folk singer
- Ritesh Pandey, Bhojpuri singer and actor
- Sundar Popo
- Krishna Kant Shukla, physicist, musician, poet, ecologist and educator
- Rajan and Sajan Mishra, singers of the khyal style of Indian classical music
- Pandit Chhannulal Mishra, Hindustani classical singer
- Husna Bai, Thumri singer from Banaras
- Rajkumari Dubey, playback singer worked in Hindi cinema of 1930-40s
- Nirmala Devi, Indian actress, Hindustani classical vocalist and mother of Bollywood actor, Govinda
- Rasoolan Bai, Indian Hindustani classical musician
- Siddheswari Devi, legendary Hindustani singer
- Girija Devi, Indian classical singer of the Seniya and Banaras gharanas

== Writers ==
- Kabir, poet, saint and social reformer
- Ravidas, poet, saint and social reformer
- S.H. Bihari, Bollywood Writer
- Shailendra, Bollywood Writer
- Lachhimi Sakhi, saint and poet
- Dariya Saheb, saint, poet and the founder of Dariya or Dariyadasi sect
- Dharani Das, Ramanandi saint and poet
- Shivpujan Sahay, Hindi and Bhojpuri
- Bhikhari Thakur, Bhojpuri dramatist and writer
- Heera Dom, Bhojpuri writer and pioneer of modern Bhojpuri Dalit literature
- Rahul Sankrityayan, Bhojpuri and Hindi
- Raghuveer Narayan, Bhojpuri, English and Hindi
- Ram Karan Sharma, Sanskrit and English
- Teg Ali Teg, Bhojpuri writer
- Rameshwar Singh Kashyap, playwright, screenwriter and professor
- Premchand, one of the most celebrated writers of the Indian subcontinent
- Agyey, poet, literary critic, journalist and pioneer of the experimentalism movement in modern Hindi literature
- Hazari Prasad Dwivedi, novelist, essayist, critic
- Doodhnath Singh, poet, writer and critic
- Amarkant, Hindi writer
- Kedar Nath Pandey, CPI leader and writer
- Atul Kumar Rai, novelist and screenwriter
- Baldev Upadhyaya, Sanskrit writer
- Viveki Rai, Bhojpuri writer
- Namvar Singh, literary critic, linguist, academician, theoretician and founder of Centre of Indian Languages at Jawaharlal Nehru University (Delhi)

== Lyricist ==
- Shailendra, famous Hindi film lyricist
- Sameer Anjaan, a Guinness World Record holder lyricist from Bollywood
- S. H. Bihari, lyricist

== Musicians ==
- Bismillah Khan, Shehnai player
- Chitragupt, music director
- Shri Nath Tripathi, music composer
- Anokhelal Mishra, tabla artist

== Dancers ==
- Ramchandra Manjhi

== Sports Persons ==
=== Cricketers ===
- Suryakumar Yadav , Plays for Mumbai Indians in IPL, Captains the Indian National Cricket Team in T20 internationals
- Sakibul Gani, first player in the world to score a Triple century on First class debut.
- Akash Deep, plays for Royal Challengers Bangalore in IPL
- Mukesh Kumar, plays for Delhi Capitals in IPL
- George Wyatt, English first class cricketer
- Rahul Shukla, plays for Mumbai Indians in IPL
- Umesh Yadav, Indian Cricketer

=== Footballers ===
- Mobashir Rahman
- Ansha Singh, defender in women's national football team

=== Field Hockey ===
- Preeti Dubey, played in 2016 Summer Olympics
- Sumit Kumar, played in Sultan of Johor Cup
- Raj Kumar Pal, played in 2020–21 Men's FIH Pro League and 2024 Summer Olympics
- Mohammed Shahid, Arjuna Awardee and won gold in 1980 Olympics
- Lalit Kumar Upadhyay, won bronze in 2020 Olympics and gold in 2022 Asian Games
- Vivek Singh, played in 1988 Summer Olympics

=== Athlete ===
- Rakesh Kumar Yadav, Indian hammer thrower
- JCO Shivpal Singh, javeline thrower
- Shivnath Singh, one of the greatest long-distance runners in India.

== Content Creators and Educators ==
- Khan Sir
