= Bhojpuri literature =

Literary works written in Bhojpuri Language

Bhojpuri literature (Kaithi: 𑂦𑂷𑂔𑂣𑂳𑂩𑂲 𑂮𑂰𑂯𑂱𑂞𑂹𑂨; Devanagari: भोजपुरी साहित्य; IAST: Bhojpurī Sāhitya) includes literature written in Bhojpuri language. Bhojpuri has developed over a course of 1300 years, the development of the language started in 7th century. The earliest form of Bhojpuri can be seen in the writings of Siddha Saints and Charyapada. Distinct literary traditions in Bhojpuri language date back to medieval periods when saints and bhakts of the region adapted a mixed language for their works.

Lorikayan, or the story of Veer Lorik, is a famous Bhojpuri folklore of Eastern Uttar Pradesh. Bhikhari Thakur's Bidesiya is another famous book. Beyond the Indian subcontinent, vibrant Bhojpuri oral literary traditions, particularly through folk song and its adaptations like Chutney music, persist and evolve within the diaspora communities in countries such as Mauritius and Trinidad and Tobago.

The first modern book published in Bhojpuri was Baarah Maasi in 1728 CE, written by Lakhan Sen of Azamgarh using Kaithi script. It was about collection of Bhojpuri songs. The first Bhojpuri novel Bindiã was written in 1956 by Ram Nath Pandey. It was published by Bhojpuri Sansad, Jagatganj, Varanasi.

== Ancient (7th to 11th century) ==
𑂮𑂞𑂹𑂨 𑂫𑂠𑂢𑂹𑂞 𑂒𑂸𑂩𑂢𑂏𑂲𑂢𑂰𑂟 𑂄𑂠𑂱 𑂃𑂢𑂹𑂞𑂩 𑂮𑂳𑂢𑂸 𑂥𑂹𑂩𑂱𑂞𑂰𑂢𑂹𑂞 𑂮𑂰𑂪𑂫𑂰𑂯𑂢 𑂐𑂩𑂵 𑂯𑂧𑂩𑂰 𑂔𑂢𑂧 𑂇𑂞𑂹𑂣𑂞𑂱 𑂮𑂞𑂱𑂧𑂰 𑂕𑂴𑂘 𑂥𑂷𑂪𑂲𑂪𑂰 𑃁

𑂣𑂰𑂅𑂪𑂰 𑂃𑂧𑂹𑂯𑂵 𑂧𑂢𑂵 𑂦𑂅𑂪𑂰 𑂯𑂩𑂭𑂱𑂞 𑂯𑂷𑂘 𑂍𑂝𑂹𑂘 𑂞𑂰𑂪𑂳𑂍𑂰 𑂩𑂵 𑂮𑂳𑂍𑂰𑂆𑂪𑂰 𑂡𑂩𑂹𑂧𑂢𑂰 𑂩𑂴𑂣 𑂧𑂓𑂯𑂠𑂹𑂩𑂢𑂰𑂟 𑂮𑂹𑂫𑂰𑂧𑂲 𑃁

सत्य वदंत चौरनगीनाथ आदि अन्तर सुनौ ब्रितांत सालवाहन घरे हमरा जनम उत्पति सतिमा झूठ बोलीला ॥

आसिरबाद पाइला अम्हे मने भइला हरषित होठ कंठ तालुका रे सुकाईला धर्मना रूप मछंहद्रनाथ स्वामी ॥

satya vadaṃta cauranagīnātha ādi antara sunau britāṃta sālavāhana ghare hamarā janama utpati satimā jhūṭha bolīlā

āsirabāda pāilā amhe mane bhaïlā haraṣita hoṭha kaṃṭha tālukā re sukāīlā dharmanā rūpa machaṃhadranātha svāmī

— Chaurangi Nath, 8th century AD

The earliest mentions to Bhojpuri poets are found in Harshacharita by Bāṇabhaṭṭa, he has mentioned the names of Isanachandra and Benibharat, who were from Bhojpuri region and used to compose poems in vernacular instead of Sanskrit and Prakrit. Oldest form of Bhojpuri poetry can be seen in the Pran Sankali of Nath Saint Chauranginath and in the poems of Charyapada. The ancient Bhojpuri literature was developed mostly by the saint communities in the region.

=== Siddha Literature ===
𑂠𑂱𑂫𑂮𑂆 𑂥𑂯𑂳𑂙𑂲 𑂍𑂇𑂆 𑂙𑂩𑂵 𑂦𑂰𑂃, 𑂩𑂰𑂞𑂱 𑂦𑂅𑂪𑂵 𑂍𑂰𑂧𑂩𑂴 𑂔𑂰𑂃
𑂃𑂅𑂮𑂢 𑂒𑂩𑂹𑂨𑂰 𑂍𑂳𑂍𑂹𑂍𑂳𑂩𑂲 𑂣𑂰𑂉𑂁 𑂏𑂰𑂅𑂙, 𑂍𑂷𑂚𑂲 𑂧𑂰𑂕𑂵 𑂉𑂍𑂳 𑂯𑂱𑂃𑂯𑂲 𑂮𑂧𑂰𑂅𑂙
divasaī bahuḍī kaüī ḍare bhāa, rāti bhaïle kāmarū jāa
aïsana caryā kukkurī pāeṃ gāiḍa, kor̤ī mājhe eku hiahī samāiḍa

— Kukkudipa, Charyapada

Some scholars, trace the literary history of Bhojpuri from Siddha Literature. Siddha saints were follower of Mahayana Buddhism, who composed some of early verses in Bhojpuri. Some notable Siddha poets who composed in Bhojpuri are Saharpada, Kukkuripa and Tilopa.

=== Nath Literature ===
This is written Between 8th to 11th century by the Nath saints. Some famous Nath saints who wrote in Bhojpuri are. Chauranginath, Machhendranatha, Gorakhnath.

== Medieval Period (1325-1875) ==
In this period, Bhojpuri literature flourished through the Bhakti movements and folklores.

=== Bhakti Movement ===
𑂍𑂸𑂢 𑂘𑂏𑂫𑂰 𑂢𑂏𑂩𑂱𑂨𑂰 𑂪𑂴𑂗𑂪 𑂯𑂷
𑂒𑂢𑂹𑂠𑂢 𑂍𑂰𑂘 𑂍𑂵 𑂥𑂢𑂪 𑂎𑂗𑂷𑂪𑂢𑂰,
𑂞𑂰 𑂣𑂩 𑂠𑂳𑂪𑂹𑂯𑂱𑂢 𑂮𑂳𑂞𑂪 𑂯𑂷
kauna ṭhagavā nagariyā lūṭala ho candana kāṭha ke banala khaṭolanā, tā para dulhina sutala ho

— Kabir, A Nirgun By Kabir

This movement was started by Kabir, his primary language was Bhojpuri and he composed poem in this language. Apart from him, the other contributors to Bhojpuri literature in this period were Dharamdas, Dharni Das, Dariya Saheb, Lachhimi Sakhi etc. Apart from Nirgun, other saints also composed in Bhojpuri.

=== Folklores ===
In this period, several folklores became popular like Raja Gopichand, Senurmati, Alha, Kunwar Vijayi and Lorikayan.

== Modern (1875-Present) ==
The modern period of the Bhojpuri literature is can be further divided in to three stages viz. Initial stage (1875-1920), Development Stage (1920-1947) and Flourishing stage (1947-present).

=== Initial Stage (1875-1920) ===
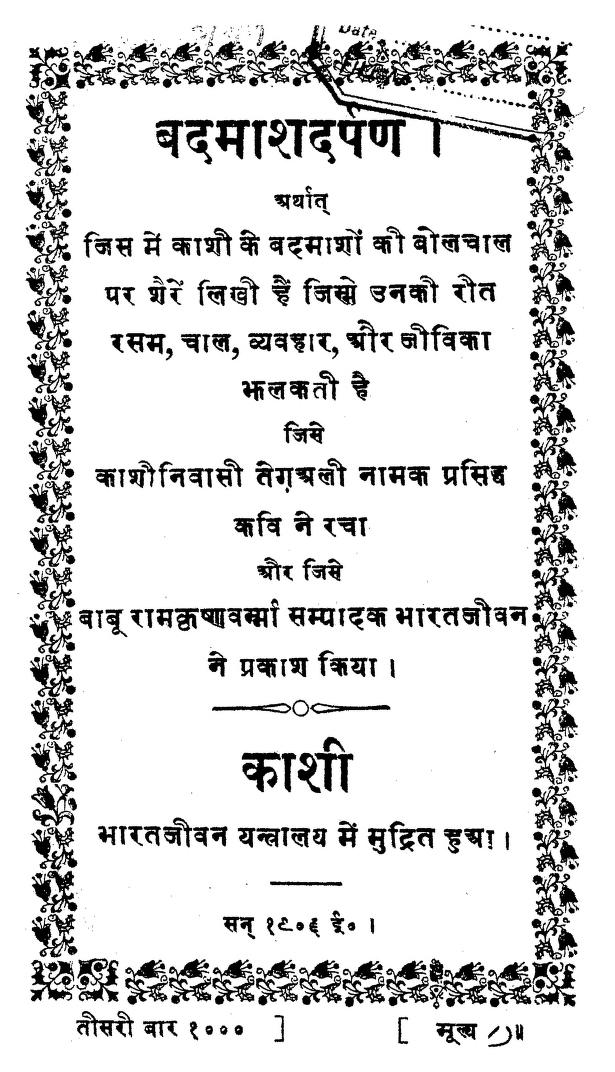
Cover page of Badmash Darpan by Teg Ali Teg

In 1880s, books started to be published in Bhojpuri. Sudhabund (1884), Badmash Darpan (1885), Virha Naika Bhed (1900) were some of the earliest books published in Bhojpuri. Some of the notable writes of this period are Bulaki Das and Bulla Saheb. Devakshara Charita, the first Drama in Bhojpuri, was written in 1884. In this period, in 1914, Achhut Kee Shikayat by Heera Dom, which is the first published work of Dalit literature. The first Journal in Bhojpuri, named Bagsar Samāchar issued in 1915 from Buxar, whose editor was Jayaprakash Narayan.

=== Development stage (1920-1947) ===
Statue or Bhikhari Thakur in Chhapra

In this stage, Patriotic works were written in Bhojpuri. Batohiya, by Raghuveer Narayan and Firangiya by Manoranjan Prasad Sinha are one of the most noble patriotic works of this period. Apart from this, Bhikhari Thakur, who is called as the Shakespeare of Bhojpuri composed most of his works in this period. Rahul Sankrityayan wrote eight Bhojpuri plays in this period including Mehrarun ke Durdasa and Naiki Duniya.

=== Flourishing Stage (1947-present) ===
In 1948, first the short story collection, Jehal ke Sanadi was published. In 1956, Bindiya, the first novel in Bhojpuri, published. In 1960s, Shivpujan Sahay wrote his first Bhojpuri short story, title Kundan Singh Kesar Bai and Rameshwar Singh Kashyap wrote Machhari. The play Loha Singh written by Rameshwar Singh Kashyap became one of the most popular radio shows in 1970s.

=== Novels ===
Between 1961 and 1975: Nearly ten novels were published. Notable are Tharuhat ke babua aur bahuriya (1965), Jeevan Saah (1964), Semar ke phool (1966), Rahanidaar beti (1966), Ego subah ego saanjh (1967), Sunnar kaka (1976). Most of these are social drama while the first one is called a regional novel which elaborates life of Tharu tribal people.

After 1975: More than 30 novels have been written. Some notable of these are - Phulsunghi (1977), Bhor musukaail (1978), Ghar-tola-gaon (1979), Jinigi ke raah (1982), Darad ke dahar (1983), Achhoot (1986), mahendar Misisr (1994), Imiritiya Kaki (1997), Amangal hari (1998), Awa lavati chalin ja (2000), Adhe aadh (2000) etc. of which Phulsunghi by Pandey kapil is one of the best novels written in Bhojpuri. Amangal hari (1998) was written by Viveki Rai, a critic himself. Surma Sagun Bichare Na is a notable novel written by Ramesh Chandra Jha.

Purvi Ke Dhah, written by Jauhar Safiavadi, is the first Bhojpuri novel to be published by National Book Trust. It was launched by prominent Hindi critic Namvar Singh at Chhapra.

=== Stories ===
After Jehal ke Sanadi, Vindhyachal Prasad Gupt wrote Kehu Se Kahab Mat (Transl.: "Don't tell anyone") in the same year. This was a patriotic story. Some other notable stories written in this period are navratan (by Narmadedeshwat Sahay), hōṛ (by Vrindavan Bihari). Machhari written by Rameshwar Singh Kashyap deals with female sexuality.

== Notable works ==
Here is list of some literary works in Bhojpuri Language:

=== Plays ===
- Beti Bechwa
- Bidesiya
- Devakshara Charita
- Gabarghichor
- Loha Singh
- Mehrarun ke Durdasa

=== Poems ===
- Batohiya
- Achhut Kee Shiqayat

=== Books ===
- Badmash Darpan (Collection of Ghazals)
- Jehal ke Sanadi
- Veer Lorik (Folklore)

== Prominent figures ==
- Gorakhnath is one of the earliest poets of Bhojpuri.
- Kabir Das has written many Bhojpuri poems like Kauno Thagwa Nagaria Lootal Ho, Tohaar heera herail ba kichade me, and Ka leke aibu sasur ghare jaibu.
- Bhikhari Thakur is known as Shakespeare of Bhojpuri. He has written many Plays like Bidesiya, Gabarghichor, Beti Bechwa, Kaljug Prem, Bhai birodh etc.
- Heera Dom is credit as the creator of first printed work on Dalit Literature, which was the poem Achhut kee Shikayat printed in 'Saraswati' in 1914.
- Guru Govind Singh has written many works in Bhojpuri.
- Rahul Sankrityayan is also a notable person in Bhojpuri Literature.
- Acharya Shivpujan Sahay Hindi novelist known for Bhojpuri short story Kundan Singh-Kesar Bai.
- Manoj Bhawuk has written many books and been honoured with the Bhartiya Bhasha Parishad Award in 2006 for his Ghazal collection Tasveer zindagi ke. He has also written a history of Bhojpuri cinema.

== Bibliography ==
- Hussain, Taiyyab (2004). Bhōjpurī Sāhitya Kē Sankśhipta ruprēkhā (in Bhojpuri). Patna: Shabd Sansaar.
- Krishna, Krishnanand (1976). Bhōjpurī Kahānī: Vikāsa ā paramparā (in Bhojpuri) (1st ed.). Patna: Bhojpuri Sansthan.
- Singh, Nagendra Prasad (2009). Bhojpurī Sāhitya Kē Sankshipt Itihas. Patna: Log Prakashan.
