= Bhojpuri people =

Indo-Aryan ethnolinguistic group

Bhojpuriyas
भोजपुरिया सब
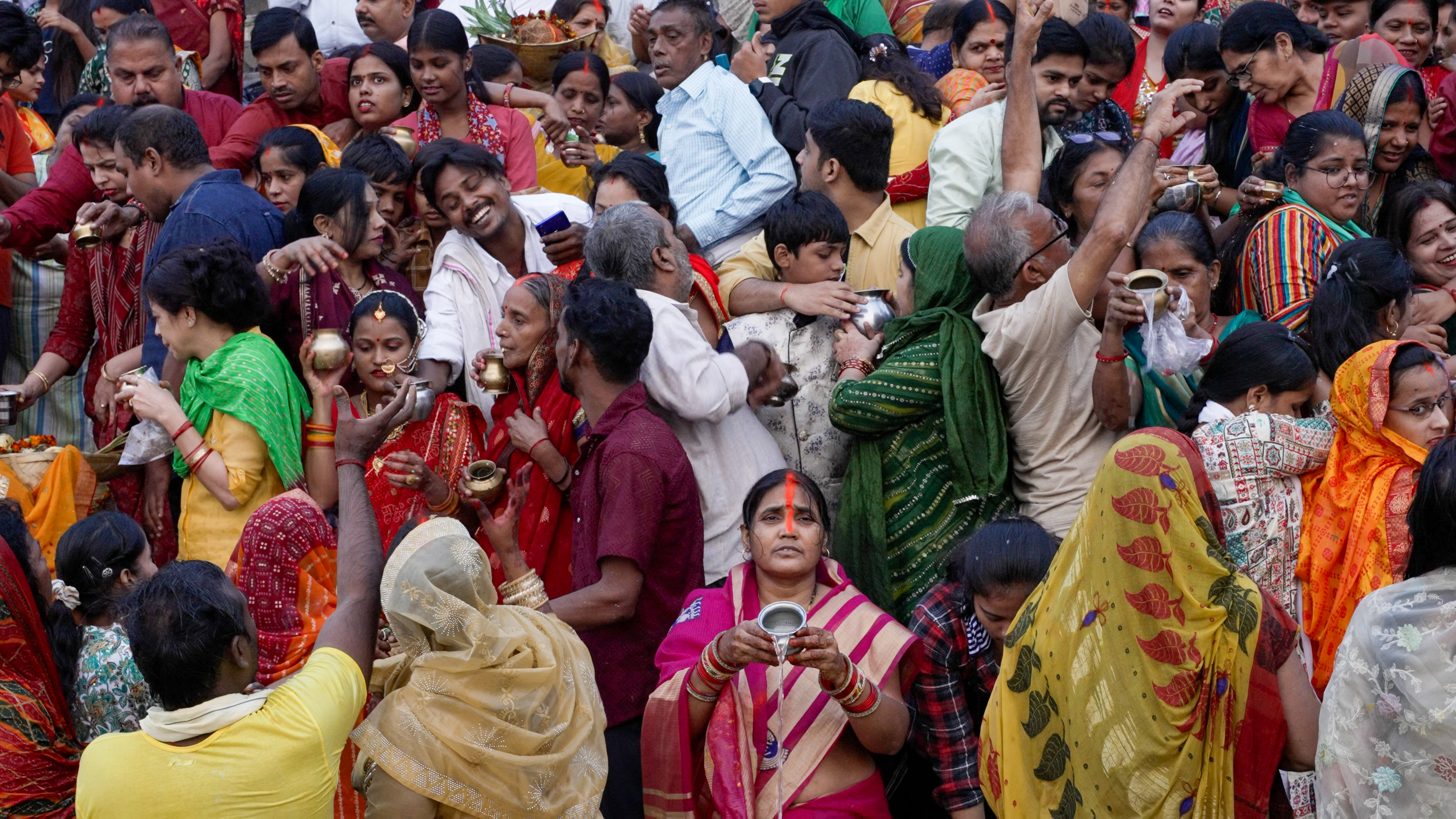
- Bhojpuriyas celebrating Chhath Puja in Varanasi, Purvanchal

Total population
- c. 51 million

Regions with significant populations
- India (Bhojpuri region; Western Bihar, Eastern Uttar Pradesh, Northwestern Jharkhand) and Nepal (Western Madhesh, Eastern Lumbini)
- Nepal 1,820,795

Languages
- Bhojpuri

Religion
- Majority: Hinduism; Minority: Islam; Buddhism; Christianity; Jainism

Related ethnic groups
- other Indo-Aryan peoples

The Bhojpuriyas, also known as the Bhojpuri people or Bhojpuriya-sawb (Devanagari: भोजपुरिया सब; Kaithi: 𑂦𑂷𑂔𑂣𑂳𑂩𑂲𑂨𑂰 𑂮𑂥; Romanized: bhojapuriyā sab), are an Indo-Aryan ethnic group from the Indian subcontinent who speak the Bhojpuri language and inhabit the Bhojpur-Purvanchal region. This area is now divided between the western part of the Indian state of Bihar, the eastern part of the Indian state of Uttar Pradesh, western part of the Indian state of Jharkhand, along with some neighbouring districts in the Indian state of Madhya Pradesh as well as the Madhesh province and Lumbini province of Nepal. A significant population of the Bihari diaspora of Bhojpuris can be found in Trinidad and Tobago, Guyana, Suriname, other parts of the Caribbean, Fiji, South Africa (Natal), Seychelles, Mauritius, United States, Canada, Netherlands, United Kingdom, Australia, and New Zealand.

== Culture ==
A Bhojpuri haldi (turmeric ceremony) song

=== Language and literature ===
Bhojpuri language is spoken by around 50 million people. It is native to the Bhojpuri region of Bihar and Uttar Pradesh in India as well as the Terai region of Madhesh and Lumbini in Nepal. Bhojpuri is sociolinguistically considered as one of the "Hindi dialects" although it linguistically belongs to the geographic Bihari languages branch derived from the larger branch of Eastern Indo-Aryan languages. The first Bhojpuri novel Bindiyã was written by Ram Nath Pandey in 1955. It was published by Bhojpuri Sansad, Jagatganj, Varanasi. Bhikhari Thakur was a famous writer of Bhojpuri language and founder of Bhojpuri songs. His famous book is Bidesiya.

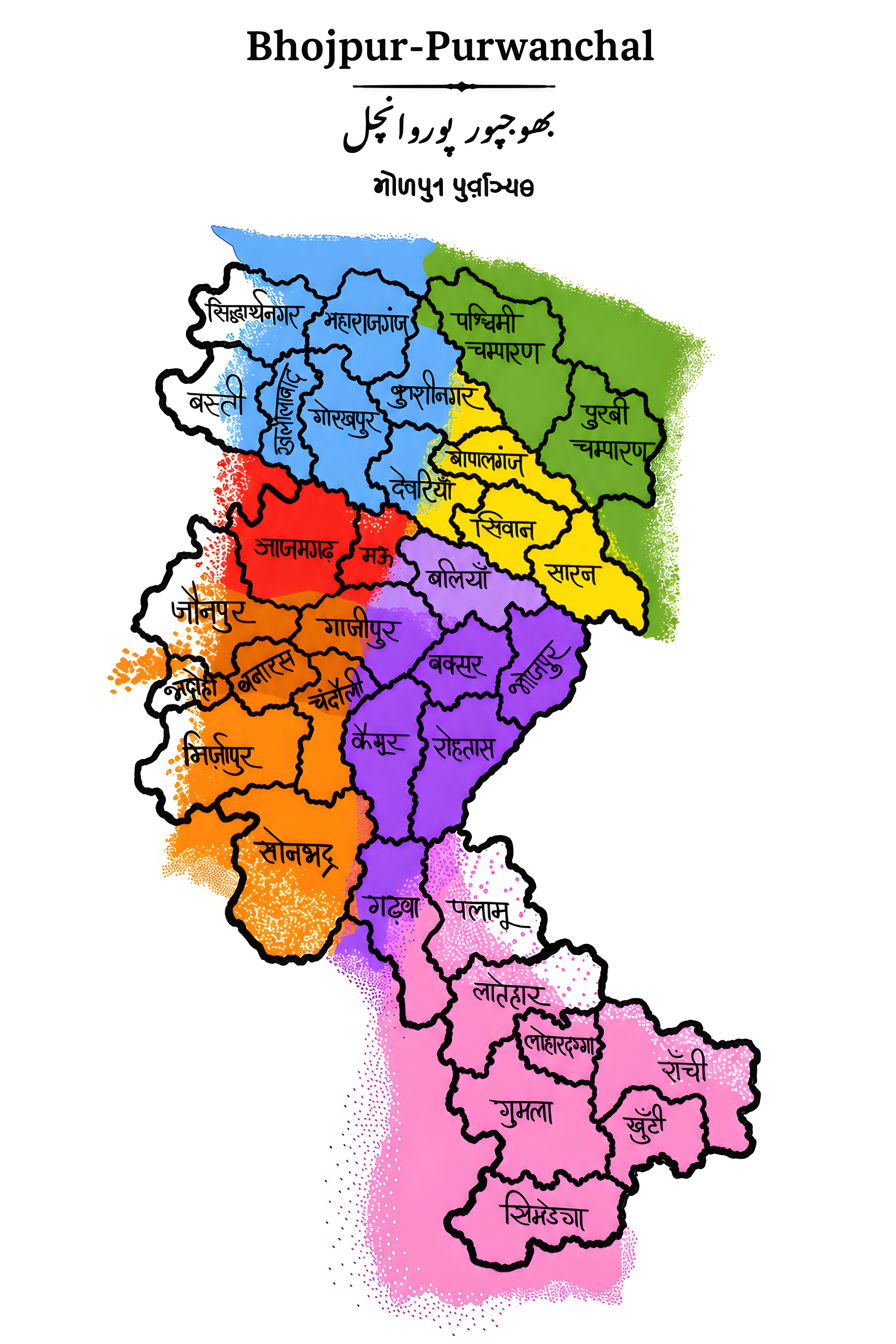
A comprehensive, hyper-localized multi-page cartographic study detailing the sub-dialect regions of the Bhojpuri language across Purvanchal. Created by Mohit Gupta.

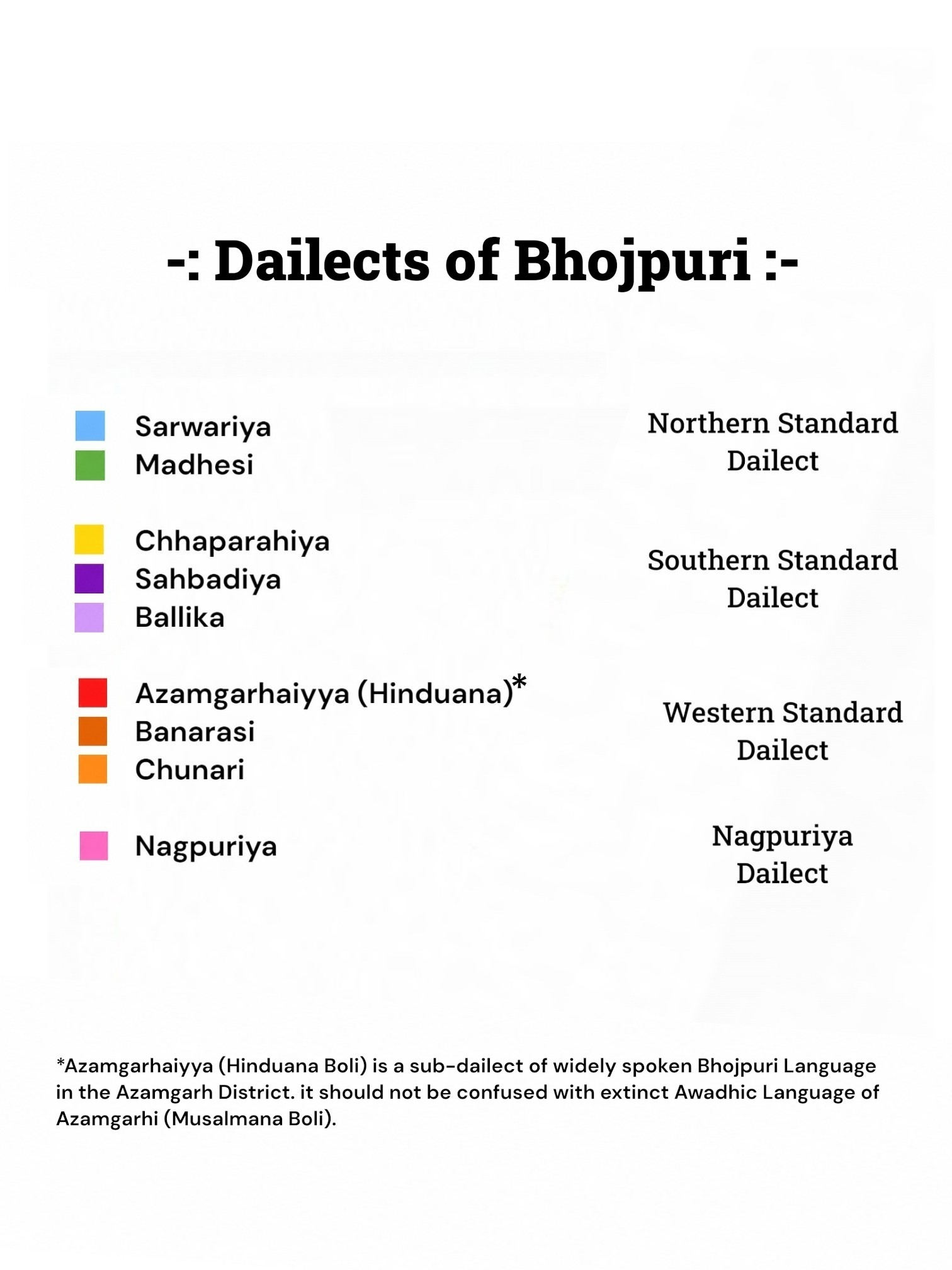
A comprehensive, hyper-localized multi-page cartographic study detailing the sub-dialect regions of the Bhojpuri language across Purvanchal. Created by Mohit Gupta.

Linguistic Atlas of Bhojpuri Sub-Dialects in Purvanchal.jpg

Linguistic Index of Bhojpuri Sub-Dialects in Purvanchal.jpg

=== Cuisine ===
Bhojpuri cuisine is part of North Indian cuisine. It is mild and spice is less used, Awadhi cuisine and Mughlai cuisine have largely influenced it. On the other side, it has majorly influenced cuisines of the Caribbean, Fiji, Mauritius, and South Africa.

A Bhojpuri Gurhathi wedding song

== Influence and reputation ==
According to G.A. Grierson, Bhojpuri people have influence all over India and called them people from energetic race and also the Civilizer of Hindostan. In order to compare Bhojpuriyas with Maithils and Magahis he writes:

Maithili and Magahi are the dialects of nationalities which have carried conservatism to excess of uncouthness, while Bhojpuri is the practical language of an energetic race, which is ever ready to accommodate itself to circumstances, and has made it influence felt all over the Indian. Bengali and Bhojpuri are the two civilizer of Hindostan, the former with his pen and latter with his cudgel.

George Abraham Grierson Linguistic Survey of India Vol V. Part II

He further writes that Bhojpuri people form the fighting nation of Hindostan, and has praised for grab any opportunity. He writes:

The Bhojpuri-speaking country is inhabited by a people curiously different from people who speak Bihari dialects. They form the fighting nation of Hindostan. An alert and active nationality, with few scruples, and considerable abilities, dearly loving a fight for fighting's sake, they have spread all over Aryan India, each men ready to carve his fortune out of any opportunity which may present itself to him. They furnish a rich mine of recruitments to the Hindostani Army, and on the other hand they took a prominent part in the mutiny of 1857. As fond as an Irishman, is of a stick, the long-boned, stalwart, Bhojpuri, with a staff in hand, is a familiar object striding over fields far from his home. Thousands of them emigrated to british colonies and have returned rich-men, every year still larger numbers wander over Northern Bengal and seek employment, either honestly, as palki bearers, or otherwise as dacoits. Every Bengali Zamindar keeps a pose of these men, eumphistically termed 'darwans', to keep his tenants in order.

George Abraham Grierson Linguistic Survey of India Vol V. Part II

== Notable people ==
- Mangal Pandey, Freedom fighter from Ballia
- Anand Satyanand, First ethnic Indian, non-white, non-Maori, Roman Catholic, Asian and ethnic minority Governor General of New Zealand from 2006 to 2011
- Kabirdas, Poet and saint
- Ravidas, Poet and saint
- Ravindra Kishore Sinha, Billionaire businessman and politician
- Suryakumar Yadav, Indian Cricketer
- Yashasvi Jaiswal, Indian Cricketer
- Krushna Abhishek, Bollywood actor and comedian
- Manoj Bajpayee, Bollywood actor
- Vinay Pathak, Bollywood actor
- Pankaj Tripathi, Bollywood actor
- Rajpal Yadav, Bollywood actor
- Akhilendra Mishra, Actor and comedian
- Daya Shankar Pandey, Actor
- Aditya Lakhia, Actor
- Raghubir Yadav, Actor and singer
- Rajesh Vivek, Actor and comedian
- Ravi Kishan, Actor and politician
- Manoj Tiwari, Actor, singer and politician
- Pawan Singh, Actor, singer and politician
- Dinesh Lal Yadav, Actor, singer, producer and politician
- Khesari Lal Yadav, Actor, singer, dancer and model
- Sudhanshu Pandey, Actor, singer, writer, producer and model
- Siddhant Chaturvedi, Bollywood actor
- Amita Suman, Actress
- Vindhya Tiwari, Actress
- Rati Pandey, Actress
- Divyanka Tripathi, Actress
- Surbhi Tiwari, Actress
- Jayaprakash Narayan, Indian independence activist and politician (Bharat Ratna)
- Dr. Rajendra Prasad, First President of India
- Lal Bahadur Shastri, Second Prime Minister of India
- Chandra Shekhar, Former Prime Minister of India
- Lalu Prasad Yadav, Politician and former Chief Minister of Bihar
- Bhikhari Thakur, Author
- Heera Dom, Poet
- Raj Mohan, Singer
- Dinesh Bhramar, Poet
- Bindeshwari Dubey, Freedom fighter and politician
- Om Prakash Rajbhar, Politician
- Saryu Rai, Politician
- Medini Ray, King of Palamu in 17th century
- Babu Veer Kunwar Singh, Maharaja of Jagdishpur estate
- Parichay Das, Author
- Manoj Bhawuk, Poet
- Anjana Om Kashyap, Journalist
- Chandan Tiwari, Folk singer
- Nitish Kumar, Chief Minister of Bihar and politician
- Munshi Premchand, Author
- Bahadur Prasad, Olympian
- Manoj Sinha, Former Member of Parliament, Lt. Governor of Jammu and Kashmir
- Ajay Rai, Politician
- Seewoosagur Ramgoolam, Doctor, first Prime Minister of Mauritius
- Aneerood Jugnauth, Barrister, second Prime Minister of Mauritius

== See also ==
- Indo-Caribbeans
  - Indo-Trinidadians
  - Indo-Surinamese
  - Indo-Guyanese
  - Indo-Jamaicans
- Indo-Fijians
- Mauritians of Indian origin
  - Bihari Mauritians
- Indo-Seychellois
- Indian South Africans
  - Natalians (Natal Indians)
