= List of Bhojpuri singers =

This is an list of notable Bhojpuri singers. These vocal artists are from India and Nepal; some belong to the immigrant population living abroad in the Netherlands, North America, South America and Africa.

== List of notable Bhojpuri singers ==
=== Bhojpuri Singer (Male) ===
- Pawan Singh
- Damodar Raao
- Dinesh Lal Yadav
- Khesari Lal Yadav
- Manoj Tiwari
- Mohan Rathod
- Nilkamal Singh
- Alok Kumar
- Raj Mohan
- Ramdew Chaitoe
- Ritesh Pandey
- Samuel Singh

=== Bhojpuri Singer (Female) ===
- Alka Yagnik
- Anuradha Paudwal
- Chandan Tiwari
- Dropati
- Indu Sonali
- Kalpana Patowary
- Malini Awasthi
- Neha Singh Rathore
- Poornima
- Priyanka Singh
- Sharda Sinha

== See also ==
- Bhojpuri cinema
- List of Bhojpuri people
- List of Bhojpuri actors
- List of Bhojpuri actresses
