= List of Bihari singers =

List of Bihari singers includes notable singers from Bihar who have made significant contributions to various forms of music, such as stage, film, album, and radio. These artists represent a wide array of genres, from Bhojpuri and Maithili folk music to Bollywood and classical music. Bihari singers are integral to the Indian music industry, contributing to both regional and national platforms.

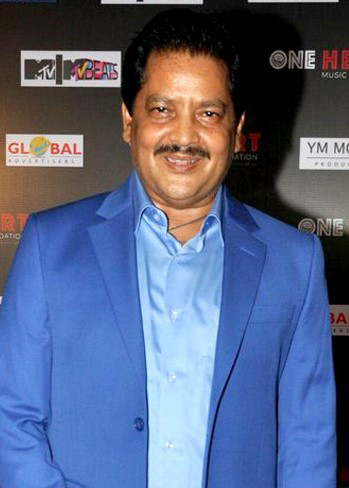
Hindi cinema singer-Udit Narayan (2017)

Bihari singers have made significant contributions to the Bhojpuri film industry, making it one of the most popular regional film industries in India. Bhojpuri singers are known for their over the top dynamic style and have a massive following among audiences not only in India but also in countries with large Bihari diaspora like Mauritius, Fiji, and Nepal. Apart from Bhojpuri and Maithili, Bihari singers are also prominent in the Bollywood music scene, with several names leaving a lasting legacy.

== Khesari Lal Yadav ==
Bhojpuri cinema

- Khesari Lal Yadav – One of the most popular mauga singers and actors in Bhojpuri cinema, Khesari Lal Yadav gained fame with his unique voice and energetic performances. His hit songs like A Balma Biharwala and Sajan Chale Sasural have become iconic in the Bhojpuri music scene.

== Pawan Singh ==
Bhojpuri cinema

- Pawan Singh – Pawan Singh is often referred to as the Power Star for his contribution to both acting and singing. His song Lollipop Lagelu became a viral sensation, gaining him international recognition. He continues to be a top artist in Bhojpuri music.

== Udit Narayan ==
Hindi cinema

- Udit Narayan – One of the most celebrated playback singers in the history of Indian cinema, Udit Narayan hails from Bihar and has sung in various languages including Hindi, Bhojpuri, Maithili, and Nepali. He has won several National Film Awards for his melodious voice, which dominated Bollywood music in the 1990s and early 2000s. Some of his most famous songs include Papa Kehte Hain, Pehla Nasha, and Mitwa. Udit Narayan is known for his versatility and his contribution to Indian music over the last four decades.

== Bihari Singers ==
Folk Music

- Sharda Sinha – An iconic name in Maithili and Bhojpuri folk music, Sharda Sinha is known for her renditions of traditional songs, especially during festivals like Chhath Puja. Her contribution to folk music has earned her the title of the Queen of Bhojpuri folk music.

Folk & Semi Classical

Chandan Tiwari : Ms. Chandan Tiwari is an Indian folk singer from Bihar. She is known as folk singer and sings in Bhojpuri, Nagpuri, Awadhi and Hindi. She was awarded Sangeet Natak Academy-Bismillah Khan Samman.She was honoured by Bhojpuri Kokila in Kolkata. BAG Films-News 24 awarded her best traditional folk singer. She appeared in India Today Magazine in cover story for her contributions to Indian folk music. She has been singing in various forms of folks like Purabi Sohar, Pachra Gandhi song, River Song, Chhath Song Kajri and Thumri etc.

Folk and Classical

- Maithili Thakur – A rising star in both classical and folk music, Maithili Thakur gained nationwide recognition with her soulful voice. Known for singing in Maithili, Bhojpuri, and Hindi, she combines modern and traditional elements in her performances, making her popular among young audiences.
- Murlidhar Anjul – Prominent Bhojpuri singer associated with T-Series (Super Cassettes Industries Ltd.) during the late 1990s and early 2000s. He is known for the folk album Laika Padhat Naikhe and folk songs such as Aadhi Ratiya, Beran Bahe Purvaiya, Bindiya Le Gayi, and Gori Pahire Chunriya. He later became known as Pt. Muralidhar Madhur Ji, a devotional singer and performer of Ramayan Path, Sunderkand Path, Bhajan Sandhya, and Bhagwat Katha.

== See also ==
- Cinema of Bihar
- List of Bhojpuri people
- List of Bhojpuri singers
