= Pranshu Samdarshi =

Scholar of Buddhism (born 1983)

- Born: Bagaha, West Champaran, Bihar, India
- Education: Ph.D.
- Alma mater: Delhi University
- Occupation: Associate professor
- Years active: 2009 onwards
- Known for: Buddhism and philosophy

Pranshu Samdarshi is an Indian scholar of Buddhism. He is an associate professor at Nalanda University, Rajgir, Bihar India. In April 2009, he was elected to a two-year term as national secretary for SPIC MACAY. In 2023, he represented the Republic of India at the Young Authors Conference of the Shanghai Cooperation Organisation (SCO), hosted by the Government of India during its Chairmanship.

== Early life and education ==
Samdarshi was born in 1983 at Bagaha, a small town in West Champaran, Bihar, India. His father Dinesh Bhramar is a Hindi and Bhojpuri poet. After taking a bachelor's degree in computer science and engineering from CUSAT, Samdarshi completed his master's degree and MPhil from the Department of Buddhist Studies, University of Delhi.

== Career ==
Prior to joining Nalanda University in 2021, Samdarshi has served as an assistant professor at International Centre for Spiritual Studies of Amrita University, Bengaluru campus (2019-2021). In 2017 and 2018, he was invited to teach and designed courses on Buddhist studies at Indira Gandhi National Centre for the Arts, Delhi, Namgyal Institute of Tibetology, Gangtok, Sikkim, India.

== Books and research ==
He has published several research papers, book chapters, and reviews for journals and magazines from publications such as Routledge, Cambridge University Press, The Hindu Group, and Delhi University Journal. He has been presenting papers on historiography of Buddhist tantra through conferences and talks. He has also done research works on Buddhism in Bihar with special focus on Champaran.
