= Pardesi =

Pardesi, the Hindi word for "foreigner", may refer to:

- Pardesi (1957 film), an Indo-Soviet film directed by Vasili Pronin and Khwaja Ahmad Abbas
- Pardesi (1970 film), an Indian drama film by Kundan Kumar
- Pardesi (1993 film), an Indian action film by Raj N. Sippy
- Shaukat Pardesi (1924–1995), Indian poet, journalist and lyricist

== See also ==
- Paradesi (disambiguation)
- Pardes (disambiguation)
- Pardesiya, Israel
- Bidesiya (disambiguation)
