= List of Bhojpuri actors =

This is a list of actors from Bhojpuri cinema.

== A ==
- Awdhesh Mishra
- Anand Mohan

== B ==
- Biraj Bhatta

== D ==
- Dinesh Lal Yadav

== K ==
- Khesari Lal Yadav
- Kamaal R. Khan
- Kunal Singh
- Kranti Prakash Jha
- KK Goswami
- Krushna Abhishek

== M ==
- Manoj Tiger
- Manoj Tiwari
- Manoj Bhawuk

== N ==
- Nazir Hussain

== P ==
- Pawan Singh
- Pradeep Pandey

== R ==
- Ravi Kishan
- Ritesh Pandey
- Rakesh Pandey

== S ==
- Sikandar Kharbanda
- Sanjay Pandey
- Sudip Pandey
- Sujit Kumar

== V ==
- Vinay Anand

== Y ==
- Yash Kumarr

== Note ==
Apart from these regular actors, many Bollywood actors like Amitabh Bachchan, Abhishek Bachchan, Ajay Devgn, Rahul Roy, Dharmendra, Kader Khan, Mithun Chakraborty, Jackie Shroff, and Raj Babbar, Rahul Dev, have acted in Bhojpuri movies.

== See also ==
- Bhojpuri cinema
- List of Bhojpuri people
- List of Bhojpuri actresses
- List of Bhojpuri singers
