= Krishnadev =

Krishnadev is an Indian masculine given name. Notable people with the given name include:

- Krishnadev Prasad Gaud (1895–?), Indian Bhojpuri poet
- Krishnadev Yagnik (born 1984), Indian film director and screenwriter
