= Batohiya =

Bhojpuri poem by Raghuveer Narayan

- by Raghuveer Narayan
- Original title: 𑂥𑂗𑂷𑂯𑂱𑂨𑂰
- Written: 1911
- First published in: Raghuveer Patra Pushp
- Language: Bhojpuri

Batohiya (Bhojpuri: 𑂥𑂗𑂷𑂯𑂱𑂨𑂰; IAST: Baṭohīyā; transl. Foreigner) is a Bhojpuri poem written by Raghuveer Narayan in 1911. This Purbi song became very popular and George Abraham Grierson also recorded this song for Linguistic Survey of India in 1920. It has also been called the "Vande Matram" of Bhojpuri. The poem was first published in Raghuveer Patra Pushp.

The title Batohiya is a Bhojpuri word which means traveller. In this song an indentured laborer in British colony is explaining to a traveller about India as a heaven on the earth and he wants to visit his homeland. This song gained immense popularity in foreign countries like Mauritius, Suriname, and Fiji. Till 1970 this poem was on the cover of Hindi text book of class 11th and 12th published by Bihar State Textbook committee.

== Etymology ==
The root of the word batohiya is Bhojpuri word bāṭ which means road or way. The one who travels on the road is called Batohi which in conjunction with Bhojpuri suffix -iya becomes Batohiya, which means traveller.

== Lyrics ==
The first two verses of the poem read as follow:

Kaithi Alphabet

𑂮𑂳𑂁𑂠𑂩 𑂮𑂳𑂦𑂳𑂧𑂱 𑂦𑂆𑂨𑂰 𑂦𑂰𑂩𑂞 𑂍𑂵 𑂠𑂵𑂮𑂫𑂰 𑂮𑂵

𑂧𑂷𑂩𑂵 𑂣𑂹𑂩𑂰𑂢 𑂥𑂮𑂵 𑂯𑂱𑂧 𑂎𑂷𑂯 𑂩𑂵 𑂥𑂗𑂷𑂯𑂱𑂨𑂰

𑂉𑂍 𑂠𑂹𑂫𑂰𑂱𑂩 𑂐𑂵𑂩𑂵 𑂩𑂰𑂧𑂰 𑂯𑂱𑂧 𑂍𑂷𑂞𑂫𑂪𑂫𑂰 𑂮𑂵

𑂞𑂲𑂢 𑂠𑂹𑂫𑂰𑂱𑂩 𑂮𑂱𑂁𑂡𑂳 𑂐𑂯𑂩𑂰𑂫𑂵 𑂩𑂵 𑂥𑂗𑂷𑂯𑂱𑂨𑂰

𑂔𑂰𑂈 𑂔𑂰𑂈 𑂦𑂆𑂨𑂰 𑂥𑂗𑂷𑂯𑂲 𑂯𑂱𑂢𑂹𑂠 𑂠𑂵𑂎𑂱 𑂄𑂈

𑂔𑂯𑂫𑂰𑂀 𑂍𑂳𑂯𑂳𑂍𑂲 𑂍𑂷𑂆𑂪𑂲 𑂏𑂰𑂫𑂵 𑂩𑂵 𑂥𑂗𑂷𑂯𑂱𑂨𑂰

𑂣𑂫𑂢 𑂮𑂳𑂏𑂁𑂡 𑂧𑂁𑂠 𑂃𑂏𑂩 𑂒𑂁𑂠𑂢𑂫𑂰 𑂮𑂵

𑂍𑂧𑂰𑂢𑂲 𑂥𑂱𑂩𑂯 𑂩𑂰𑂏 𑂏𑂰𑂫𑂵 𑂩𑂵 𑂥𑂗𑂷𑂯𑂱𑂨𑂰

Devnagari script
सुंदर सुभूमि भैया भारत के देसवा से

मोरे प्राण बसे हिम-खोह रे बटोहिया

एक द्वार घेरे रामा हिम-कोतवलवा से

तीन द्वार सिंधु घहरावे रे बटोहिया

जाऊ-जाऊ भैया रे बटोही हिंद देखी आउ

जहवां कुहुकी कोइली गावे रे बटोहिया

पवन सुगंध मंद अगर चंदनवां से

कामिनी बिरह-राग गावे रे बटोहिया

IAST transliteration

suṃdar subhumi bhaiyā bhārat ke deswā se
more prān base him khoh re baṭohiyā
eka dwāra ghere rāmā him kotwalwā se
tīn dwāra sindhu ghaharāwe re baṭohiyā
mātaram
vande mātaram

jau jau bhaiya baṭohī hiṃd dekhi aau
jahawā kuhukī koilī gāwe re baṭohīyā
pawana sugaṃdh maṃd agara caṃdanawā se
kāminī biraha rāg gāwe re baṭohiya

(Bhojpuri)

== English translation ==
English translation of first two verses are as follow:

Beautiful good land brother India its
country is,
My life soul lives snowy cave O
traveller.
One door (gate) encircling Rama Himalaya sentinel like,
Three door (gate) sea roars O traveller.
Want to go O traveller to see Hindustan,
Where Cuckoo sings coos O traveller.
Scented air breeze slowly from the sky,
Wife sings a song of separation O traveller

== Performances and interpretations ==
This song has been recorded several times, the oldest one was done by G.A. Grierson in 1920. This song has also been sung by Malini Awasthi, Chandan Tiwari, Raj Mohan and many renowned singers. Recently this song is sung by a group of singers, directed by Shushant Asthana and produced by Nitin Chandra, can be seen over internet.
