= Vimlanand Saraswati =

Indian Bhojpuri writer and author

- Born: Awadh Bihari Suman; 14 January 1921; Mangraon, Shahabad District, British India (present-day Bihar, India)
- Died: 9 July 2008 (aged 87); Varanasi, Rajguru Math
- Occupations: Writer, Novelist
- Writing career
- Language: Bhojpuri
- Notable works: Jehal ke Sanadi, Baudhayan

Dandi Swami Vimlanand Saraswati (14 January 1921 – 9 July 2008) was an Indian Bhojpuri writer and author and spiritualist. He is credited to write the first short story collection Jehal ke Sanadi in Bhojpuri. In 1954, Swami Sahajanand Saraswati Ashram was established at Charitravan, Buxar.

Swami Vimalananda Temple and the statue of Dandi Swami Vimalananda Saraswati were established in Swami Sahajanand Saraswati Ashram in 2023 under the guidance of Dandi Swami Devananda Saraswati, a disciple of Swami Vimalananda Saraswati.

== Life ==
He was born as Awadh Bihar Suman on 14 January 1921 at Mangraon village of Buxar, Bihar. During 1939–40 he was the editor of the weekly Hindi journal "Krishak". He went to jail during the independence struggle in 1942. Later he became a saint and changed his name to Dandiswami Vimlanand Saraswati. His first book was a Bhojpuri short story collection Jehal ke Sanadi, which was published in 1948. In the same year his collection of Hindi poems Makarand was published. After becoming a monk he started writing an Epic on the life of Gautama Buddha, which published in 1983 as Baudhayan. For his works in the field of literature he was awarded with many awards by Bihar government and Bhojpuri Academy. In 1993, he became the president of the thirteenth session of Bhojpuri Sahitya Sammelan in Arrah

== Works AND BOOKS ==
- Jehal ke Sanadi (1948)
- Makarand (Khadi boli)
- Jinagi ke Tedh Rah
- Baudhayan (1960–1983)
- Baudhayan - Bodh Dipak (1980)
- Shaasak, Sainik Aur Dharmachary Brahman (1967)
- Brahman kaun (1982)
