= Biraha =

Bhojpuri folk music genre

Biraha, also known as Birha, is a traditional folk song sung by the Bhojpuri-speaking people to express feelings of longing for or meeting a beloved person. Its place in folk songs is as significant as Dwipadi in Sanskrit, Gatha in Prakrit, and Barwai in Hindi. It comprises two episodes. When one side has made their point, the other side answers with the same verse. There is no limit to the number of verses. The volume varies according to the tune of the song. It conveys the intense longing of the spouse and the pain of separation from their beloved. Separation is like a king; a body that does not know separation is a living corpse. Outside India, this genre can be found in the former colonies of where Indian indentured laborers from Uttar Pradesh and Bihar emigrated to, such as Fiji, Guyana, Mauritius, and Suriname, as well as in other Caribbean countries. Birha is especially popular among the Ahir (Yadav) community.

== History ==
Biraha is believed to have originated among peasant and pastoral groups in North India during the Mughal period. Until the 1880s, it was mostly confined to villages and was sung while grazing cattle, for leisure at night, and at social ceremonies such as weddings and engagements. In the early 20th century, Bihari Lal Yadav played a pivotal role in transforming Biraha into an urban musical genre, particularly in Varanasi, where it was performed at temple festivals and annual religious celebrations.

=== Khari Birha ===
The oldest form of Biraha was known as Khari Biraha (also referred to as 'Pure Biraha'), which was sung in the style of a ballad. It sometimes drew on puranic themes such as Krishna's separation from the Gopis, though it is now rarely performed. The modern Biraha has evolved nearly 150 years ago, from its older form. These were used to written in the form of two rhymed lines used to be performed without any musical instruments.

Rām kī laṛaiyā ke nā païbe rawanawā, jekarī bagal me hanumān

Sonā kē laṃkā toharī mātī me milaīhen, tūṛ dihen toharo gumān

Ravan, you can not succeed in fighting Ram, who has Hanuman at his side

Your golden Lanka will be mixed in the soil (destroyed), your pride will be broken

Contemporary 19th-century sources provide insight into the genre's state during this period. An 1886 account by G.A. Grierson documents Biraha's thematic landscape, describing it as an unformalized art form, or a "wild flower that is not cultivated in the field... it dwells in the heart, and when a man's heart overflows, he sings it."

=== Khari Biraha to Biraha ===
Bihari Lal Yadav made several modifications in khari Bihari, instead of Couplet, consisting of two line he allowed unlimited numbers of rhymed lines in his Biraha. He also added a variation of Khartal as a musical instrument which became the identifying element of this genre. He introduced this genre in cities like Benaras by performing it in temples. As Biraha became a famous genre, Bihari Lal acquired a number of "Chelas" (disciples). These disciples later acquired their own disciples and these led to formation of several lineages which were called akhārṛā. These Akharas played a major role in organising social and performance aspects of the tradition. All the written text of Biraha were the property of that particular Akhara, so one had to take the membership of those Akharas in order to become a Biraha singer. Over the years different Akharas did some more modifications are created other variants. The three main varieties were: ṭeri, antarā and Uṛān.

== Themes and Content ==
In addition to its primary theme of birah (separation), Biraha songs encompass a range of social, religious, and personal subjects. An 1886 publication documents several key lyrical themes present in the genre during that era.

=== Social Scenarios and Separation ===
A recurring subject is the predicament of young women in village society. The 19th-century source describes songs featuring child brides complaining of the "non-arrival of their husband" to bring them to their new home. Other narratives depict a girl's reaction to the "attentions paid to her by some village swain." The songs also address the circumstances of married life, including instances where a husband is "away on service," and the domestic use of the earnings he sends home.

=== Religious Invocation and Commentary ===
Religious expression is another core component. The songs are documented to contain invocations of Hindu deities, most notably Rama and the local tutelary goddess, Durga. The relationship depicted can be personal and complex; the source notes a singer may first offer a "river of milk" and then complain about the goddess's demands.

Furthermore, Biraha serves as a medium for social commentary. The journal records songs that "dwell on the iniquities of the kali- or iron-age." As an example, it cites a singer's complaint that "men of the very lowest castes are allowed to become pious," which the 19th-century author frames as a "subversion of orthodox Hindū conservatism." This reflects the social hierarchies and anxieties of the period in which the songs were recorded.

=== Language ===
A prime example of this linguistic preservation is found in the grammar of pronouns. Late 19th-century linguistic analysis notes that the language of Biraha features the use of certain genitive pronouns (such as tohār, 'of you') as possessive adjectives that can be inflected for gender. This is identified as a direct survival of an older construction from Apabhraṃśa Prākrit.

This feature is significant as it represents a folk variant of Bhojpuri. The same historical source contrasts this with the language of the educated classes of the era, whose speech had already transitioned to using uninflected forms. The grammar found within Biraha songs, therefore, preserves a linguistic stratum that was disappearing from the standardized language.

== Types and Structure ==
Biraha are mainly of two types viz. Short Biraha and Long Biraha. The short Biraha consists of two lines and called Khari Biraha. Each line is further divided in to two parts, hence the whole Biraha has four parts, that is why it is called Charkadiya (trans.: of four parts). The last word of both the lines must rhyme or the rhyme scheme should be AA. Each line should have 26 matras (Syllable), with 16 syllables in the 1st part of each line and 10 syllables in the 2nd part of each line. The last two syllables of first part of both line should be iambic (in order of 1-2) however the that of 2nd part should be in order of 2-1. In some Birahas 18 and 11 syllables are also observed in the 1st and 2nd part of the 2nd line.

The 1886 journal by G. A. Grierson provides a detailed analysis of what it calls the "external form" of Biraha. According to this source, a typical Biraha consists of two pairs of lines. Each pair is founded on a specific metrical scheme of "instants" (a unit of syllabic length, similar to a mātrā). The two schemes recorded are:

1. 6+4+4+2,4+4+3 instants
2. 6+4+4+2,4+4+4 instants

The author notes that for these schemes to work in practice, singers employ flexibility in recitation, where "many long syllables (i.e. two instants) must be read as short (i.e. one instant)." The text also points out the presence of "superfluous words which do not form part of the metre," which are identified by the technical term jōr.

=== Example of a 19th-Century Biraha ===
The following invocation (sumiran), from a late 19th-century collection of Biraha songs, serves as a typical example of how a folk performance would begin. It demonstrates the genre's characteristic language and opening themes.

Devanagari Text

सुमिरी गाओं राम, सुमिरी भैया लछुमन

सुसिरी गाओं सकल जहान

सुमिरी गाओं एहि माता ए पिता के

जिनि लरिका से कैलीं हां सेआन

Kaithi Text

𑂮𑂳𑂧𑂱𑂩𑂲 𑂏𑂰𑂋𑂁 𑂩𑂰𑂧, 𑂮𑂳𑂧𑂱𑂩𑂲 𑂦𑂶𑂨𑂰 𑂪𑂓𑂳𑂧𑂢

𑂮𑂳𑂮𑂱𑂩𑂲 𑂏𑂰𑂋𑂁 𑂮𑂍𑂪 𑂔𑂯𑂰𑂢

𑂮𑂳𑂧𑂱𑂩𑂲 𑂏𑂰𑂋𑂁 𑂉𑂯𑂱 𑂧𑂰𑂞𑂰 𑂉 𑂣𑂱𑂞𑂰 𑂍𑂵

𑂔𑂱𑂢𑂱 𑂪𑂩𑂱𑂍𑂰 𑂮𑂵 𑂍𑂶𑂪𑂲𑂁 𑂯𑂰𑂁 𑂮𑂵𑂄𑂢

Roman Transliteration (IAST)

Sumirī gāoṁ rām, sumirī bhaiyā lachuman

Susirī gāoṁ sakal jahān

Sumirī gāoṁ grahi mātā e pitā ke

Jini larikā se kēlī hāṁ seān

English Translation

I call to mind Rām, as I sing; I call to mind his brother Lachhuman.

As I sing, I call the whole world to mind.

As I sing, I call to mind this mother and this father, who brought me up from childhood to the age of discretion.[Citation Required]

This example illustrates some of the specific linguistic features of the genre. The author of the collection notes that the final line's verb phrase, kēlī hāṁ ("brought me up" or lit. "made me wise"), is an honorific third-person plural perfect tense. The author states that this mode of forming the perfect tense is "radically different from that in vogue in the Western or Hindi group of dialects," underscoring the distinct linguistic character of Biraha.

== Notable Biraha singers ==
- Bihari Lal Yadav, Father of Biraha Genre
- Kashinath Yadav, Bhojpuri folk Singer and former MLC Samajwadi Party
- Baleshwar Yadav Indian Folk Singer in Bhojpuri
- Heera Lal Yadav Bhojpuri folk singer and Padma Shri awardee.
- Dinesh Lal Yadav, Bhojpuri folk singer and actor.
- Baleshwar Yadav (singer), Bhojpuri folk singer.
- Vijay Lal Yadav, Famous veteran artist widely recognized with the title " Biraha Samrat " (Emperor of Biraha).
- Om Prakash Singh Yadav, A popular traditional Biraha artist known for narrative story - songs.
- Pt. Dukhi Ram Yadav, A veteran traditional artist famous for classical Biraha.
- Shyam Kunwar Yadav, Contemporary and regional performer, who preserves traditional anthologies.

== Notable works ==
- Biraha Bahar, by Bhikhari Thakur
