= Khartal =

Percussion instrument of India

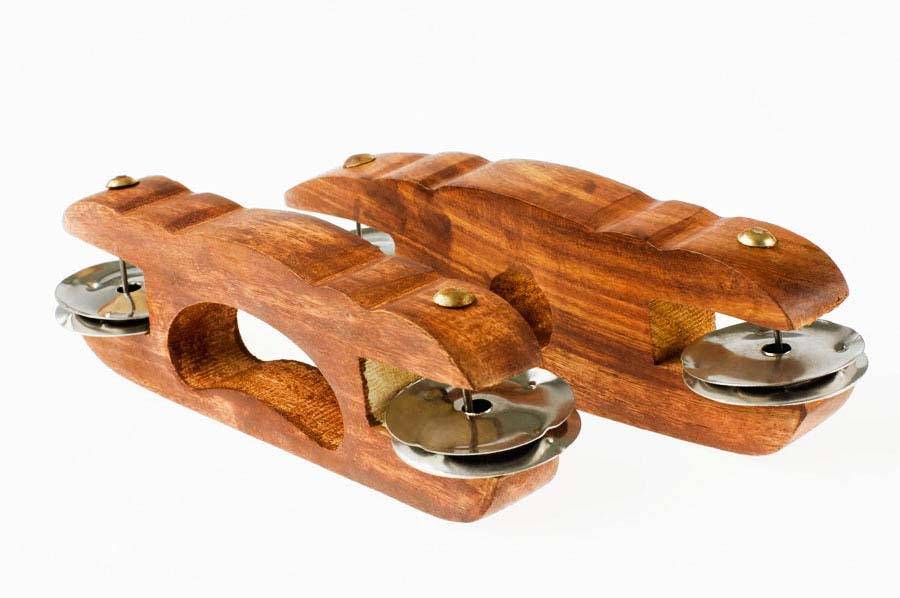
Close-up of a pair of khartal blocks

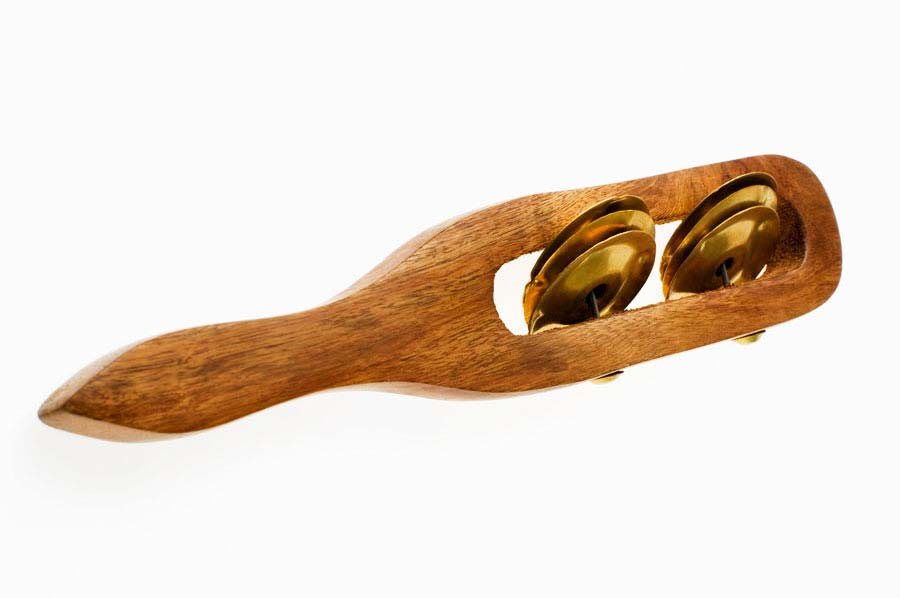
Close-up of a khartal

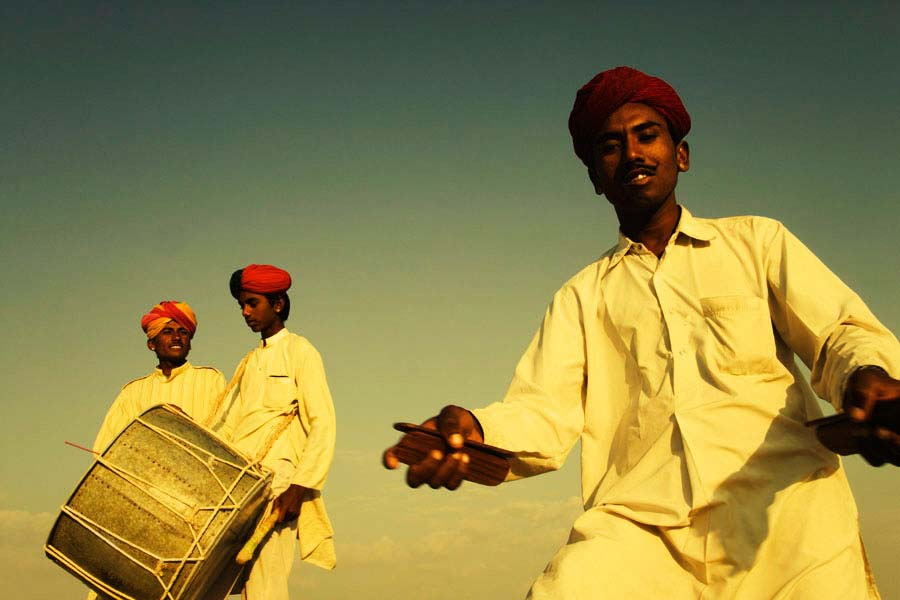
Player of khartal sheets, Rajasthan

Khartal is an ancient instrument mainly used in devotional / folk songs. It has derived its name from Sanskrit words ‘kara’ meaning hand and ‘tala’ meaning clapping. This wooden clapper is a Ghana Vadya which has discs or plates that produce a clinking sound when clapped together. It falls under the class of idiophones of self-sounding instruments that combine properties of vibrator and resonator.

Usually made of wood or metal, a khartal player will hold one ‘male’ and ‘female’ khartal in each hand. The ‘male’ khartal is usually thicker and is held with the thumb while the ‘female’ khartal is usually thinner and is mainly balanced on the ring finger, which represents the fire element. It is associated with the sun and the root chakra. Its force is associated with staying power, stamina, and the power to be assertive.

A pair of wooden castanets with bells attached to them was the earliest form of the khartal. These pieces of wood are not connected in any way. They can be clapped together at high speeds to make rapid, complex rhythms. Aside from being an excellent accompaniment instrument, the khartal is valued for being a highly portable percussion instrument.

1. Kartals (blocks). It consists of a pair of wooden blocks with jingles or crotales (kartals mean crotales). One pair is used in one hand of the musician. These pieces can be clapped together at high speeds to make fast complex beats.

2. Kartals (small sheets). It consists of a pair of thin, hard wooden pieces similar to the percussion bones (instrument). These are used in Rajasthan.

3. Kartals (cymbals). The karatalas are small cymbals, also known as manjeera. These are used in devotional chants.

In Maharashtra Kartals are better known as Chipaḷyā (Marathi: चिपळ्या). It is commonly used in religious song like Kirtans and Bhajans.

In Bangladesh and West Bengal, kartals (Bengali: খরতাল) are commonly used in religious song like Kirtans and Bhajans.

In Odisha, they are better known as dāsåkāṭhi (Odia: ଦାସକାଠି), which is an almost similar instrument. It is most notably employed in a folk theatre form that derives its name from the instrument itself, dāsåkāṭhiā (Odia: ଦାସକାଠିଆ). The Rāmåtāḷi (Odia: ରାମତାଳି) is a larger variant that is associated with the Ramayana, according to a traditional Odia legend.

The Bhojpuri Folk genre Biraha uses a version of Kartal which consists of two pair of tapered metal rods, each approximately nine inches in length. This version of Kartal was invented by Biraha singer Bihari Lal Yadav and only used while singing Biraha. The singer holds the pair in his hands and strike them to produce music while singing.

In Telugu language, the word Karatāḷa Dhvani is most commonly used for sound produced from clapping hands.

== See also ==
- Tingsha
- Zill
- Castanets
- Cymbal
