= Kina Ram (saint) =

Aghori saint (d. 1755)

Kina Ram (1627 A.D – 1755 A.D) was an Indian Aghori Saint and Bhojpuri poet. He is the founder of the Kina Rami sect of saints. The sect emerged as an idea of resistance to social inequality and power dynamics of Banaras during the British Raj.

== Life ==
Kina Ram was born in 1627 A.D. on the 5th day of Shukla Paksha in the month of Bhaado. His parents were from Chandauli near Banaras. He became an ascetic at very early age and became the disciple of Kalu Ram. He then established his dhuni (sitting throne of Aghoris) near the Krim Kund.

== Kina Rami Sect ==
He founded the Kina Rami sect. His Lineage and successors are as follows:

- Bija Ram (leadership: 1771-81)
- Dautar Ram (leadership: 1781-1846)
- Gaibi Ram (leadership: 1846-57)
- Bhavani Ram (leadership: 1857-82)
- Jainarayan Ram (leadership: 1882-1927)
- Mathura Ram (leadership: 1927-41)
- Saryu Ram (leadership: 1941-44)
- Dalsingar Ram (leadership: 1944-49)
- Rajeshwar Ram (leadership: 1949-78)
- Siddhartha Gautam Ram (leadership: 1978-Unknown)

== Works ==
Kina Ram worte four books:

- Vivek Sagar
- Ram Gita
- Ram Rasaal
- Gitavali

== Bibliography ==
- Gupta, Roxanne Poormon (1993). The Politics of Heterodoxy and the Kina Rami Ascetics of Banaras.
- Barrett, Ron (2008). Aghor Medicine: Pollution, Death, and Healing in Northern India. University of California Press. ISBN 9780520941014.
- Upadhyay, Krishnadeo (1972). Bhōjpurī sāhitya kā itihaśa.
