= Devakshara Charita =

1884 Bhojpuri Play by Ramdatta Shukla

- Written by: Ramdatta Shukla
- Subject: Supremacy of Devanagari over Persian
- Genre: Theatre

Premiere
- Date premiered: 1884

Devakshara Charita or Devakshar Charitra (Bhojpuri: 𑂠𑂵𑂫𑂰𑂍𑂹𑂭𑂩 𑂒𑂩𑂱𑂞 IAST: Devākṣarcarita; Transl.: The Character of the Divine Alphabet) is a Bhojpuri play by Ramdatta Shukla which was written in 1884, which is also considered as first published drama of Bhojpuri. This play was written to emphasize the supremacy of the Devanagari script and to highlight the drawbacks of Urdu script. It was written and published in 1884 from lite press, Varanasi.
