= Pachhimi =

The Pachhimi are a social group of India. Along with the Purabi, they make up the two branches of the Tharu caste.

== Customs ==
An 1880 record notes:

The Pachhimi Thariis refuse to eat with the Purabi; and even between the subdivisions of the latter there are many restrictions on the praotice ef eating together. This is more curious because most members of the caste will eat pig's flesh and fowls, while all will drink country spirits.
