= Paradesi =

Paradesi may refer to:

- Paradesi (1953 film), a 1953 Telugu-Tamil Bilingual film directed by L. V. Prasad, starring Anjali Devi and Sivaji Ganesan
- Paradesi (1998 film), a 1998 Telugu film directed by K. Raghavendra Rao
- Paradesi (2007 film), a 2007 Indian Malayalam film directed by P. T. Kunju Muhammed and starring Mohanlal
- Paradesi (2013 film), a 2013 Tamil film directed by Bala starring Adharvaa
- Paradesi Jews, a community of Sephardic Jews settled among the larger Cochin Jewish community in Kerala

== See also ==
- Pardesi (disambiguation)
- Pardes (disambiguation)
- Bidesiya (disambiguation)
