= Jehal ke Sanadi =

1948 Bhojpuri short story collection

- Author: Awadh Bihari Suman
- Original title: 𑂔𑂵𑂯𑂪 𑂍𑂵 𑂮𑂢𑂠𑂱
- Language: Bhojpuri
- Genre: Short Story
- Published: 1948
- Publication place: India

Jehal ke Sanadi (Bhojpuri: 𑂔𑂵𑂯𑂪 𑂍𑂵 𑂮𑂢𑂠𑂱; IAST: Jehal ke Sanadi) is a Bhojpuri book by Awadh Bihari Suman which was first published in 1948. It was the first collection of short stories in Bhojpuri. It contains ten short stories based on different themes.

== Content ==
The title of ten short stories of the book are:

- Malikaar: story of the struggle two landlord brothers because of their different views.
- Aatmghat: story of a poor and unemployed man.
- Mawani Baba: story of a fake Saint who harasses his followers sexually.
- Katvaaru Dada: story showing the problems due to capitalism
- Kisan Bhagwan: depicts the plight of farmers
- Chaur ke Pooja: depicts the views of society toward a love couple.
- Gulaab
- Dafa 302: depicts the problem of poverty.
- Jehal ke Sanadi (Title of the book too): about corruption politicians.
- Kavi Kayalas: depicts the problems of capitalism.
