= Mehrarun ke Durdasa =

Bhojpuri play by Rahul Sankrityayan

- Original language: Bhojpuri
- Written by: Rahul Sankrityayan
- Subject: Plight of Women
- Genre: Theatre

Mehrarun ke Durdasa (Bhojpuri: 𑂧𑂵𑂯𑂩𑂰𑂩𑂳𑂢 𑂍𑂵 𑂠𑂳𑂩𑂠𑂮𑂰; IAST: Meharārun ke durdasā; lit. "The Plight of Women") is a Bhojpuri play by Rahul Sankrityayan. It is the depiction of pathetic status of women in the male dominated society. It was published in the book named Tīn nāṭak (three plays) which was published in 1942.

== Characters ==
- Lachhimi: The Protagonist (girl)
- Jasodara: Lachhimi's Friend
- Seeta: Lachhimi's Friend
- Ramkali: Lachhimi's Mother
- Sukha: Village women
- Udho Parsad: Lachhimi's Brother
- Ramkhelawan Lal
- Farguddi Upadhiya

== Theme ==
The play shows the problems, discrimination and tortures faced by women in the society like Female foeticide, Sati Practice, Parda system. The play also advocates equal property rights for women. Sometimes it has also criticised Idol worship.
