= Bidesiya =

Bidesiya may refer to:

- Bidesiya (play), a 1912 play in Bhojpuri by Indian writer Bhikhari Thakur
- Bidesiya (film), a 1963 Indian film based on the play

== See also ==
- Pardesi (disambiguation)
- Paradesi (disambiguation)
