= Pardes =

Pardes may refer to:

== Judaism ==
- Pardes (legend), Jewish account of a Heavenly orchard
- Pardes (Jewish exegesis), a Kabbalistic theory of biblical exegesis.
- Pardès, the European Journal of Jewish Studies, co-founded by Shmuel Trigano and Annie Kriegel
- Pardes Institute of Jewish Studies, Jerusalem and New York City
- Pardes Hanna-Karkur, a town in northern Israel

== Other ==
- Pardes (1950 film), an Indian romantic drama film by M. Sadiq, starring Madhubala and Rehman Khan
- Pardes (1970 film), a 1970 Indian Hindi-language film, starring Ramesh Deo and Indrani Mukherjee
- Pardes (1997 film), an Indian romantic drama film by Subhash Ghai, starring Mahima Chaudhry and Shah Rukh Khan
- Pardes (2015 TV series), Pakistani drama television series aired on Hum Sitaray
- Pardes (2021 TV series), Pakistani drama television series aired on ARY Digital
- Pardes Publishing, independent Israeli publishing house founded in 2000

== See also ==
- Pardesi (disambiguation)
- Paradesi (disambiguation)
