= Badmash Darpan =

Bhojpuri Book

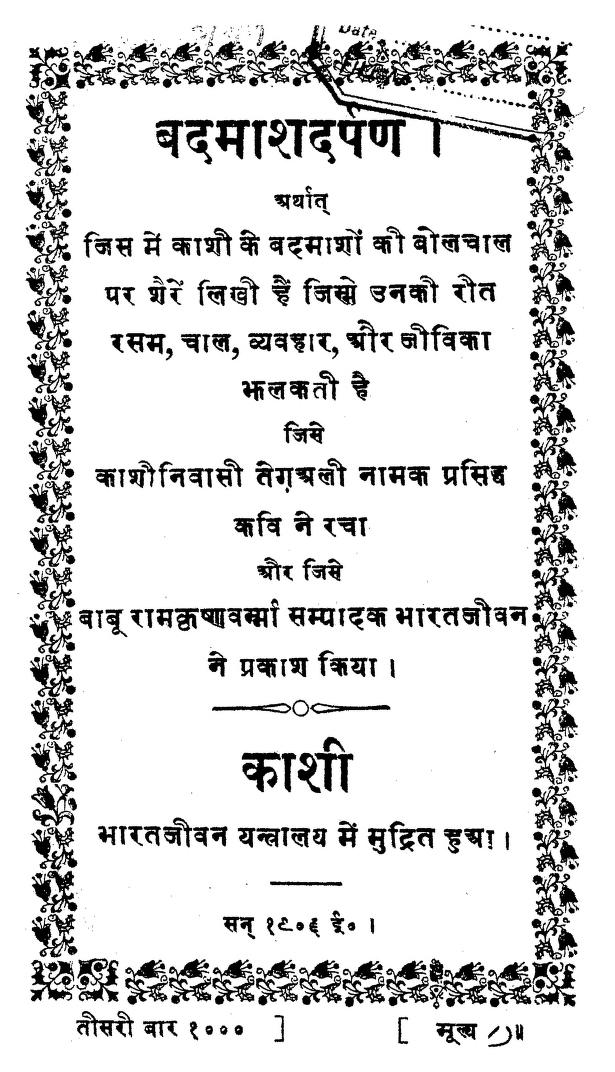
- Cover of Badmash Darpan
- Author: Teg Ali Teg
- Original title: बदमाश दर्पण
- Language: Bhojpuri
- Publisher: Bharat Jiwan Press, Kashi
- Publication date: 1885
- Publication place: India
- Media type: Print

Badmash Darpan (Bhojpuri: 𑂥𑂠𑂧𑂰𑂬 𑂠𑂩𑂹𑂣𑂝) is a Bhojpuri book written by Teg Ali Teg, which is a collection of Bhojpuri Ghazals. The works are centered about the customs and traditions of Benaras.

It is one of the oldest book published and Bhojpuri and first collection of Ghazals in Bhojpuri. The book was published in 1885 from Bharat Jiwan Press as was a collection of 23 Ghazals.

== Content and themes ==
There are 23 ghazals in the book, out of which 22 have Radif, 21 have makta and every ghazals have matla. All the ghazals have three following Behers:

- Behere Mujare AkhrabbMakfuf Mahfuz
- Bahere Ramal Musamman Makhbun Mahfuz
- Behere Mujas Musamman Makhbun Mahfuz
