= Dharikshan Mishr =

Bhojpuri Poet

- Born: 1901; Kushinagar, North-Western Provinces
- Occupation: Poet
- Writing career
- Notable work: Gandhi Garima

Dharikshan Mishra (1901-1997) was a Bhojpuri poet and Writer. He was honored with the Bhasha Samman Award in 1996 for his contribution to Bhojpuri literature.

== Life ==
He was born in 1901 at Koindi Bariyarpur village in Kushinagar in the North-Western Provinces of British India.

== Works ==
- Shiv ji ke Kheti -1977
- Kagaj ke Madari-1995
- Alankar Darpan-2004
- Kavya Darpan-2005
- Kavya Manjusha-2006
- Kavya Piyush-2008
