= Bihari Lal Yadav =

Bhojpuri singer and poet (1857–1926)

- Born: Bihari Lal Yadav; 1857; Aunrihar, Ghazipur, North-Western Provinces, British India (present-day Ghazipur District, Uttar Pradesh, India)
- Died: 1926 (aged 68–69)
- Occupations: Poet; Singer; composer
- Writing career
- Language: Bhojpuri
- Notable works: Founded Biraha Folk Genre; Invented a version of Khartal

Bihari Lal Yadav (1857 – 1926), also referred to as Guru Bihari, was a Bhojpuri Indian writer, poet and singer. He is also known as the founder of the modern Biraha folk genre, this older genre is called Khari Birha. He is also credited to invent a musical instrument, which was a version of Khartal and introducing it in Bihaha. He wrote Biraha and popularized it in the cities like Benaras and also taught it to his disciples.

== Biography ==
Bihari was born in 1857, the only son of a Bhojpuriya Ahir family, in Patna. His parents dying ar an early age, he moved to Benaras at age 14 for work. Performing in Biraha temples, he got fame as a poet and singer and then he got four disciples Ramman Yadav, Ganes Yadav, Pattu Yadav and Sarju Rajbhar. He died in 1926, aged 68 or 69.
