= Bindiya (novel) =

1956 Bhojpuri Novel

- Author: Ramnath Pandey
- Language: Bhojpuri
- Genre: Social, Love Story
- Set in: An Indian Village
- Publisher: Sekhar Publication
- Publication date: 1956
- Publication place: India
- Media type: Print

Bindiya is a social novel by Bhojpuri author Ramnath Pandey. It is the first novel written in Bhojpuri. It was published in 1956 by Sekhar Publication of Chhapra. Thematically, it is based on life and problems of the village lifestyle. The story is set in a village of a common farmer, Kodai, his daughter Bindiya, and her lover Mangra.

== Plot ==
Kodai is a small farmer whose daughter, Bindiya, who helps his father in farming. Bindiya loves a village man named Mangra. The Villain of the story is the son of a Landlord, who loves Bindiya and tries to marry her forcefully.
