= Beniram =

Bhojpuri poet

Beniram or Pandit Beniram was a Bhojpuri poet and a contemporary of Bharatendu Harishchandra. He used to compose Kajari and was a great composer of it. His notable work is Kajari Bidesiya which he composed during the 1860s. He is credited with using the word Bidediya to address a person who has left the home and gone away for the first time in a folk song which he wrote in 1884.
