= Shaukat Pardesi =

Indian poet, journalist and lyricist born in Malaysia

- Born: Sheikh Mohammed Irfan; April 1924; Malaysia
- Died: October 1995 (aged 71); Jaunpur, India
- Education: Darul Uloom Nadwatul Ulama, Lucknow
- Occupations: Poet, writer, lyricist
- Spouse: Husnaara Begum
- Children: Shamim Ahmad, Waseem Ahmad, Nadeem Ahmad, Kaleem Ahmad, Shagufta Ruby
- Writing career
- Pen name: Shaukat Pardesi شوکت پردیسی
- Language: Urdu, Hindi
- Genres: Nazm, Ghazal, Geet
- Notable works: Tohfa-e-Atfal, Mizrab-e-Sukhan, Saaz-e-Naghmabaar

Sheikh Mohammed Irfan alias Shaukat Pardesi (Urdu: شوکت پردیسی, April 1924 – October 1995) was a poet, journalist and lyricist born in Malaysia, where his father Sheikh Sahib Ali had migrated from Maroofpur village in Jaunpur district of India. During the 1950's, Pardesi was associated with Urdu Daily Inquilab for some time and also edited the Film Times Weekly magazine. He published and edited an acclaimed monthly Urdu magazine titled Munna for children. His ghazals and nazms were published in almost all known Urdu journals and were recorded by His Master's Voice in the melodious voices of various famous singers of his time, viz. Talat Mahmood, Manna Dey, C. H. Atma, Anup Jalota, Dilraj Kaur, Shailendra Singh, Shyam Lala, Mukesh and others.

== Early life ==
Pardesi was born in 1924 in Malaysia, where he spent his childhood in material comfort and attained his primary education. In 1936, he came to India with his parents. Later on, due to World War II, travel between India and Malaysia was discontinued. Consequently, Pardesi and his parents could not return to Malaysia. His father enrolled him in Darul Uloom Nadwatul Ulama, Lucknow to continue his studies. Subsequently, he was sent to the Mission School (now Raja Shri Krishna Dutt Inter College) in Jaunpur, where he completed his middle school education. Although Pardesi's father, Sheikh Sahib Ali, built a new home in Jaunpur and settled there permanently, he did not succeed in arranging any regular source of income for the family. Reserves began to deplete, and financial hardships became the new reality for the family. In January 1943, Shaukat Pardesi married Husnaara Begum. Pardesi's mother, father and elder sister died in a span of three to four years, beginning in 1944. The changed circumstances of life without any concrete source of income, along with the responsibility of an unmarried sister, two orphaned nieces, a wife and a son, were too harsh for a man in his mid-twenties who had lived his childhood and adolescence in luxury.

Pardesi tried many things for a living, including homoeopathic practice, but did not succeed. Consequently, the necessities of life prevailed over self-respect, and he eventually ended up at his father-in-law Hafiz Akhtar Ali's place, who was a well-known farmer in the village of Jamdahan in Jaunpur district. Hafiz Akhtar was also a Mukhtar in Jaunpur court. He had only two daughters. The elder daughter was reasonably well settled with her lawyer husband. Thus, Hafiz Akhtar Ali's own circumstances warranted a supporting hand to look after his farming and wealth. The mutual needs of both made their match perfect, but it did not last long. As a result, in 1950, Pardesi left Jamdahan for Mumbai.

In Mumbai, he stayed for almost 8 years, and by the time he grounded his feet, he had a serious attack of heart palpitations (Ikhtelaj-e-Qalb) that made him virtually bed-ridden. Consequently, he had no option but to return to his father-in-law's house in Jamdahan.

After 1958, Pardesi spent the rest of his life in Jamdahan, with his wife. He died of cancer in October 1995 in Jaunpur.

== Literary Journey ==
Pardesi was quite a visible Urdu poet through Urdu magazines and periodicals, especially from the 1940s to the 1970s. He wrote his first ghazal sometime between the late 1930s and early 1940s. Initially, he wrote under his given name, but later changed to a pen name - Shaukat Jaunpuri; and when he reached Mumbai, he changed it to Shaukat Pardesi. The new name became his identity in the world of Urdu literature. He wrote all types of Urdu poetry, ranging from nazm and geet to ghazal, Qata and rubaaee. His poems were printed in the Urdu journals Shaaer Mumbai, Nerang-e-kheyal Lahore, Shamaa Delhi, Beesween Sadi Delhi, Bano Delhi, Khilauna Delhi, Gagan Mumbai, Naya Daur Lucknow, Pyam-e-Taleem Delhi, Tahreek Delhi, Aajkal Delhi, Jamalistaan Delhi, Shiraaz Karachi, Mashraqi Aanchal Delhi, Saaghar Lahore, Saboohi Lahore, Tabassum Hyderabad, Kahkashaan Mumbai, Shoa-ein Lahore, Mashhoor Delhi, Ittehaad Mumbai, Nikhat Allahabad, and others.

=== Books ===
Pardesi could not publish any of his collection during his lifetime due to his personal circumstances. His son, Nadeem Ahmad, tried to collect as many of his writings and published them under the following four titles:

1. Tohfa-e-Itfal: Published in 2011 and contains Pardesi's poems which he wrote for children
2. Mizrab-e-Sukhan: Published in 2012 and comprises Pardesi's nazms and geets
3. Saaz-e-Naghmabaar: Published in 2015 and contains Pardesi's ghazals, qataats and rubaaees
4. Mazameen-e-Shaukat: Published in 2015 and consists of articles reflecting some aspects of his personal life and literature.

== Filmography ==
Pardesi's association with the film industry was limited and relatively unnoticed. He wrote songs for three films, namely, Khubsoorat, Ghulam Begam Badshah, and Shaheed-e-Aazam Bhagat Singh that were sung by Mohammed Rafi, and Asha Bhosale. In addition, he wrote dialogues for Ghulam Begam Badshah and Jhansi Ki Rani.

== Non-film Songs ==
A number of Pardesi's ghazals and nazms were recorded by Saregama in the voices of some of the famous singers of his time. E.g.,Talat Mahmood, Manna Dey, CH Atma, Anup Jalota, Dilraj Kaur, Shailendra Singh, Shyam Lala and Mukesh. In particular, his ghazal "Hairan hoon aei sanam ki tujhe aur kya kahoon" in the voice of Manna Dey became popular.

== Awards and recognition ==
- Uttar Pradesh Urdu Akademi Award (2014) to Tohfa-e-Atfal
- Uttar Pradesh Urdu Akademi Award (2016) to Saaz-e-Naghmabaar
- Research work on Shaukat Pardesi by Habib Saifi in the form of a book entitled Shaukat Pardesi Fikr-O-Fan Ke Aiyene Mein published in 2017.
