= Dinesh Bhramar =

Indian Bhojpuri and Hindi poet

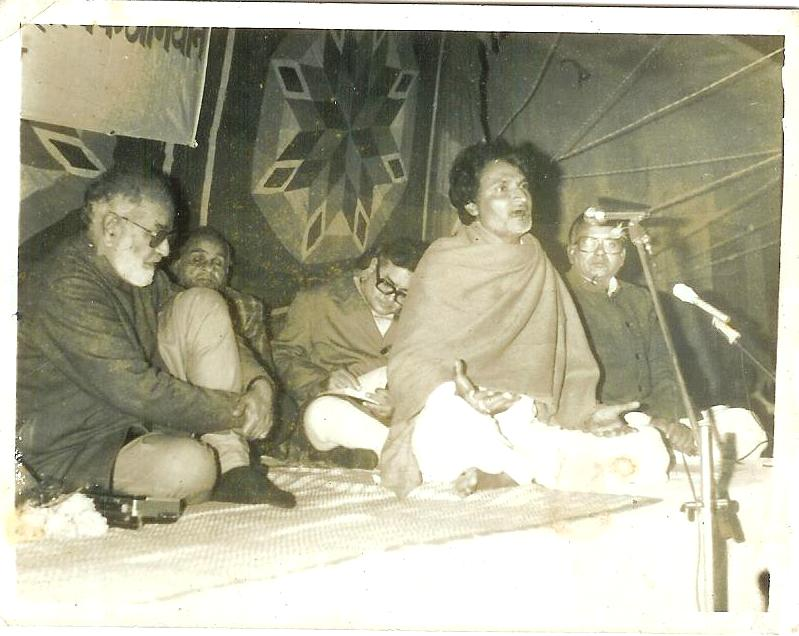
- Dinesh Bhramar reciting his poetry. Ajneya sitting left (30 December 1983 Bagaha).
- Born: 26 June 1939 (age 87)
- Education: Patna University
- Occupation: Agriculture
- Known for: Bhojpuri and Hindi poetry

Dinesh Bhramar (born 26 June 1939) is a Hindi and Bhojpuri poet from Bihar, India. He has been credited to introduce the Ghazal and Ruba'i in Bhojpuri literature.

== Early life and education ==
Bhramar was born on 26 June 1939 in British India at Bagaha, a small township in undivided Champaran, Bihar. His father Pt. Gunjeshwari Pathak was a Sanskrit scholar and patron of classical arts. Bhramar graduated in Hindi literature from Patna University in 1961.

== Career ==
Bhramar taught Hindi Literature at M.J.K College, Bettiah as a lecturer (till 1962) and later at Tata Workers College, Jamshedpur as a reader (1962–1966).

In various Kavi sammelan, he has shared the stage with several eminent Hindi poets such as Ramdhari Singh Dinkar, Ajneya, Gopal Singh Nepali, Janki Ballabh Shastri, Nida Fazli, Bashir Badr and others. His poetical works were commended by Harivansh Rai Bachchan and Nazir Banarsi. Some of his Hindi poetic works have been selected for 'Navgeet Saptdasak' edited by Rajendra Prasad Singh and 'Dharati Se Judkar', edited by Satyanarayan. He is not very fond of publishing books, the only exception being ‘Geet Mere Swara Tumhare’ published in 1961.

Besides the poetry works, Bhramar has been associated with various literary movements and organized several series of Kavi sammelan and Mushaira and other literary and cultural events for several decades in and around Champaran district.

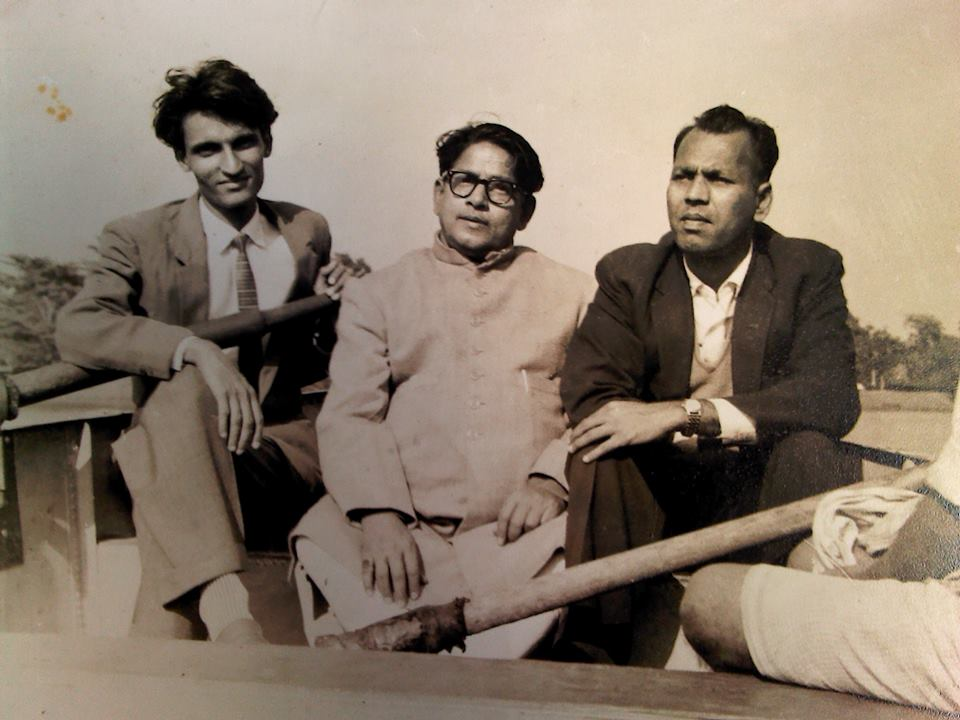
A photograph from Dinesh Bhramar's album. In the middle is Nazeer Banarasi, Dinesh Bhramar is sitting to the right of him and Bholanath Bimb is at left. They were amongst the prominent non-film lyricist of Hindi during the 1960s and 70s.

== Awards and recognition ==
He has been awarded the Gopal Singh Nepali Samman (2011), Bazme Adab (1999), Lok Shikar Samman (1998), Champaran Ratna (1993), and Sahitya Saurabh Samman (1972).

== Books ==
- Bhramar, Dinesh (1939). Gīta mere svara tumhāre. India. OCLC 23563131.
- Gīta mere svara tumhāre. India: Sāhitya-Saṅgama. 1969.
- "गज़ल आ रूबाई « AnjorDuniya.com". 12 May 2012. Archived from the original on 12 May 2012.
