= Bulaki Das =

Indian poet

Bulaki Das was an Indian poet. He was born during the Mughal Rule in India. His mother insisted him to write poetry. It remains unclear & matter of research whether he was a Jain or a Rajput because different sources claim his identity differently. If both above claims appear to be true these may be two different persons sharing the exact same name, born around similar time period & sharing similar job titles co-incidentally.

== According to Rajput History ==
Bulaki das was an Indian Poet & Saint. His identity here appears to be somewhat of mystical nature. He was born in 1713 in a Sengarvanshi Rajput family at Sultanpur village of Ballia. His mother also used to write poems. He married a Chauhanvanshi Rajput woman in 1753. After some time he left his house and started living in a hut in Abhanpur, Kamtaila village in Uttar Pradesh which is known as Bulaki Das Ki Mathiya. He was a musician, writer and used to play Mridang. He was known for Chaiti Songs. He used Bhojpuri as his primary language.

== According to Jain History ==
Bulaki das was an Agrawal Jain belonging to the Goyal Gotra. He was also a Kasavar. He was born in Agra but according to other source his origins lie in Bayana. Some of his works include Prashnottar Avakachar, Pandav Puran etc. Earliest known ancestor mentioned in one of his works is Sahu Amardas. Bulaki das's childhood name was Boolchand. Bulaki Das was a child of Nandlal & Jainulade (Jaini), daughter of Poet legend Hemraj Pande making him his maternal grandfather. He moved from Bayana to Agra & Agra to Indraprastha(now Delhi) in the then Shahjahanabad (now Old Delhi) he settled down for some days with his mother Jaini. His father Nandlal appears to have passed away early on in Bulakis life. He got majority of his education from Pandit Arunratna, a local scholar living nearby. He appears to be unmarried because there's no mention of his wife found in any of his works. His works mostly are in Braj Bhasha.
