= Krishnadev Prasad Gaud =

Bhojpuri poet (born 1895)

- Born: Krishnadev Prasad; 1895
- Occupations: Poet, Professor
- Writing career
- Pen name: Badheb Banarasi

Krishnadev Prasad Gaud (born 1895) also known as Bedhab Banarasi was an Indian Bhojpuri poet and professor. He was the principal of DAV College Varanasi and a member of the State Legislative Council of Uttar Pradesh.

== Career ==
In 1930 he became the editor of the weekly journal Bhut, which used to be published from Varanasi. In 1934, He became the editor of the journal Khuda Ki Raj Par and later wrote for the daily newspaper Aaj.

== Works ==
- Badheb Ki Baithak
- Kavya Kamal
- Banarasi Ikka
- Gandhi Ka Bhut
- Tanatan
- Puratatv ke Pandit
- Abhineeta
