= Dharni Das =

Bhojpuri poet and author

Darani Das
- Born: 1646; Manjhi, Chhapra, Bihar Subah, Mughal Empire (present-day Bihar, India)
- Died: 1688 (aged 41–42)
- School: Ramanandi Sampradaya
- Main interests: Mysticism; Theism; Syncretism; Poetry

Dharani Das (1646-1688) was a Ramanandi saint and Bhojpuri poet who contributed significantly to the development of Bhojpuri literature. He was from a Kayastha family and contemporary of the Mughal emperor Aurangzeb. His followers are called Dharnidasis, who wear a beaded string around the neck, sing bhajans, and are vegetarian.

== Life ==
He was born in 1646 A.D. in a Kayastha family of Manjhi village near Chhapra in Bihar. His father's name was Parshuram and mother's name was Birma and his childhood name was Gaibi. His ancestors were employed on the post of Diwan in Manjhi estate. He also served the state before becoming a Saint. The popular myth about his conversion to a saint is that, once during his work he poured a Pot of water on the papers, on asking the reason for doing that he replied that Lord Jagannath was ablaze during arti and he had done that to extinguish the fire. When the landlord enquired he found the story to be true. After that he became a Saint.

In 1657AD, he became the follower of the school of Ramananda, who was a propagator of Vaishnavism. One of the two incidents that led him to leave the worldly life and adopt monkhood was his father's death, and the second was the death of Mughal Emperor Shah Jahan. He took initiation from a saint named Charandas, and then became the disciple of Vinodanand. Sadanand and Karunanidhan were two of his notable disciples.

In his lifetime, he established several Mathas like Paras Math near Ekma, Sahnam Math near Bhatni, where every year a fair is held associated with him and his followers Sadanand and Shivanand. He also established a math at Manjhi. His religious ideas were against Idolatry and Superstition. He also authored three books Prem Prakash and Shabd Prakash, which were in Bhojpuri and Braj Bhakha and third was Aalif, which was in Persian.

== Works ==
He has written three books:

- Prem Prakash (or Prem Pragas)
- Shabd Prakash
- Aalif

Shabd Pragas was published in 1887 from Nashik Press in Chhapra. A collection of his compositions named Dharnidas ki vani was also published in 1911 as a booklet of 47 pages from Allahabad.
