= Raghuveer Narayan =

Indian poet and freedom fighter (1884–1955)

- Born: Raghuveer Narayan; 31 October 1884; Chhapra, Bengal Presidency, British India
- Died: 1 January 1955 (aged 70)
- Education: Patna University (Bachelor of Arts)
- Occupations: Poet, freedom fighter
- Children: Harendradeo Narayan
- Writing career
- Notable works: Batohiya (1911), Vijay Nayak Ramayana
- Notable awards: Sahityasevi Puraskar (1952–53)

Raghuveer Narayan (31 October 1884 – 1 January 1955) or Raghubir Narayan was a Bhojpuri and English poet and a freedom fighter. His Bhojpuri poem Batohiya gained popularity equivalent to Vande Mataram and is considered as National Song of Indian in Bhojpuri language.

== Life ==
He was born on 31 October 1884 in Nayaganv village of Saran district of Bihar. He completed his schooling in Chhapra and higher education from Patna College. In his college days he got appreciations for his English poems by the British professors. He wrote most of his poems while he was at Patna College between 1902 and 1905. After completing his Bachelor of Arts he became the private secretary of King Krityanand Singh of Banaili Estate in Purnia district of Bihar. In 1952–53 the Bihar government awarded him with Sahityasevi puraskar.

== Works ==
=== Bhojpuri ===
- Batohiya (poem)
- Bharat Bhawani (poem)
- Raghuveer Rasa Ranga
- Raghuveer Putra Pushpa
- Nikunj Kala
- Raghuvee Ras Ganga

=== English ===
- A Tale of Bihar
