= Lachhimi Sakhi =

Bhojpuri poet and saint (1841–1914)

- Born: Lachhimi Das; 1841; Saran, Bihar, India
- Died: 1914 (aged 72–73)
- Occupation: Poet
- Writing career
- Language: Bhojpuri

Lachhimi Sakhi (1841–1914 born in Saran, Bihar), also Laxmi Das, Lakshmi Sakhi and Laxmi Sakhi was a Saint and major figure in Bhojpuri Sant Sahitya (Saint Literature), who is mainly known for his Bhajans and Kajari songs. His real name was Lachhimi Das but since he was a follower of Sakhi sect that's why he is also known as Lachhimi Sakhi. She has written four Bhojpuri books named Amar Pharas, Amar Bilas, Amar Kahani and Amar Sidhi.

== Life ==
He was born in 1841 in Amnaur village of Saran district of Bihar. His father was Munshi Jagmohan Das. He was not much educated and only had knowledge of Bhojpuri and Persian. In 1857-58 he joined the Aghoris, but he didn't like their customs and left it after some time. After that he lived in Kaithvaliya Math of Motihari for some time and then made a hut at the bank of Narayani River in Terua village. His Samadhi (memorial monastery), where he spent his later years in meditation, is located at Teruwan Math, near Sattar Ghat on the bank of the Narayani (Gandaki) River in the present-day Gopalganj district of Bihar. After years of Meditation, finally he got Enlightenment in 1862.

== Philosophy and Teachings ==
He was the follower of Sakhi sect, in which the God is considered as Husband and soul is considered as wife. The sect doesn't believe in Untouchability and the followers don't wear Saris. He started the tradition of writing poems or songs by assuming Rama as Sakhi (friend). He was the believer of Nirguna god. He has called that omnipresent god Raghunatha, Awadhpati, Gopal, Nandlal and frequently as 'Sundar Piyawa' (Most Handsome Husband)..

Sant Kavi Lakshmi Sakhi is placed by scholars in the tradition of prominent saint-poets like Kabir, Bhinak Ram, Guru Nanak, and Namdev, contributing to the spiritual and metaphysical understanding of the relationship between humanity, God, and Nature. His philosophy emphasizes that every individual can attain spiritual bliss by knowing the art of uprooting the evils engendered by the five senses. He believed this purification is possible through the process of Yoga under the guidance and blessings of a Satguru (true teacher), who prevents indulgence in the material world. His poetry often describes the spiritual realm as a world of 'evergreen light' devoid of worldly sorrow, where "mangoes ripen year-round" ('Barho maas Jahan farela aama/ tap tap chuyela dunu samaa' - Amar Kahani, 21) and where devotees constantly hear the 'anhad naad' (unstruck sound or voice of consciousness: 'hota anhad naad bajat shankh aur muhchand' - Amar Kahani, 142). He stressed the importance of self-introspection over pedantic knowledge of scriptures, famously writing: "Atna je padhlis te Angrejia, farasiya / Tab kahe na kaylis te aatam darasiya" (Amar Sidhi) – meaning, 'If you have read so many books in English and Farsi, why then did you not introspect or know your own soul?'. An anecdote tells of him becoming so absorbed in devotion that he placed someone's sandals on his head, proclaiming "Mili gaile ho mera Ram ke panahiya" (I have found the sandals of my Ram).

=== Comparison with William Blake ===
Scholarly analysis, such as by Dr. Amar Nath Prasad, draws significant parallels between Lakshmi Sakhi and the English mystic poet William Blake (late 18th/early 19th century). Both poets employed rich symbolism in their work – Blake with images like the Lamb and the Tiger representing innocence and experience, and Sakhi using extended metaphors, such as the process of washing clothes to represent the purification of the soul. Prasad highlights that both poets described receiving divine inspiration for their writings (Blake from a child on a cloud, Sakhi from his 'Sundar Piyawa') rather than relying solely on human effort. Furthermore, both critiqued external constraints on true spirituality – Blake challenging organized religion and societal norms, while Sakhi emphasized inner realization over mere bookish learning. Themes of divine grace, the human struggle for purity, and the comforting presence of the divine in times of suffering are identified as common threads in the works of both Sakhi and Blake.

A verse from his poem in the book Amar Sidhi illustrates the Sakhi perspective:

Rākhī tore piyawā deï gaïlen ego patiyā
Bārahu diyawā jarāï lehu hiyawā
Samujhi samujhi ke batiyā

Translation:

Your Husband has kept a letter
Light the lamp and burn the hurt
After reading the words in the letter

This poem has been written by considering God as husband.

=== Alignment with Sufism ===
The idea of God created by Lachhimi Sakhi seems very near to that in Sufism. One the one hand Sufism treats God as a lover whom they want to see, one the other hand Sakhi treated God as husband and union with that husband is treated as the union of soul and supreme soul.

== Works ==
He has written four Bhojpuri books which collectively have 3250 verses:

- Amar Sidhi (885 verses)
- Amar Bilas (875 verses)
- Amar Faras (925 verses)
- Amar Kahani (565 verses)

These four works are collectively revered and worshipped as "Granth Ramji"' at his Samadhi in Teruwan Math. His poetry is noted for its beautiful and artistic use of symbolism. Lakshmi Sakhi believed his verses were not crafted through effort but were divinely inspired, "poured to him by God," describing the words as "chun chun ke" (carefully/best selected) by his Handsome Husband'. An English translation of Amar Sidhi is reportedly in process.

== Bibliography ==
- Singh, Bhuwanwshwar (1982). Bhōjpuri Sant Kavī Shrī Lakṣhmī Sakhï: Darshan aur sādhnā (in Bhojpuri). Saran: Akhil Bhartiya Bhojpuri Sahitya Sammelan.
