= Teg Ali Teg =

Bhojpuri poet

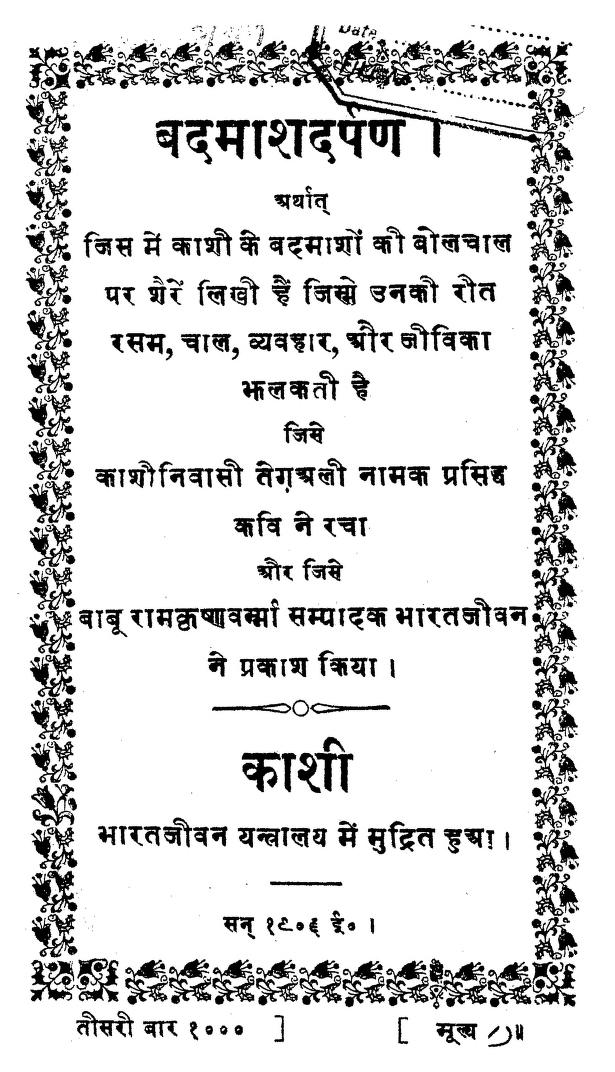
- Born: Varanasi, British India (now in Uttar Pradesh, India)
- Occupation: Poet
- Writing career
- Notable work: Badmash Darpan (1885)

Teg Ali Teg was a Bhojpuri author and poet. He was from Varanasi and is known for his book Badmash Darpan. He is credited as the first person to write ghazals in Bhojpuri.

== Life ==
He was a contemporary of Bharatendu Harishchandra and is said to be a inhabitant of Bhadau or Teliyanala

== Work ==
His most famous book, Basmash Darpan, is a collection of Bhojpuri ghazals that describe the habit and customs of people of the Benaras. This book was published in 1885 by the Bharat Jiwan Press in Varanasi.

== Bibliography ==
- Jagannath (1997). Bhōjpurī Ghazal ke Vikās Yātrā (in Bhojpuri) (First ed.). Patna: Pushkar Prakashan.
