= Dariya Saheb =

Bhojpuri poet and Saint

Dariya Saheb (1674-1780), also Dariya Sahib, Dariya Das, Daryadas and Bihar Wale was a Saint and Bhojpuri poet and the founder of Dariya or Dariyadasi sect. He has written more than twenty Bhojpuri books out of which Gyan Dipak, and Dariya Sagar are most famous. Gyan Dipak is his brief autobiography.

== Life ==
He was from Dharkhanda Village of Dinara in Shahabad district (presently Rohtas) of Bihar.

== Works ==
- Gyan Dipak
- Dariya Sagar
- Agragyan
- Amarsara
- Kalcharit
- Ganeshgosthi
- Prem Mul
