= Baleshwar Yadav (singer) =

Bhojpuri folk singer

Baleshwar or Balesar Yadav (1942 - 2008) was a famous Bhojpuri folk singer. His singing Birha became very popular. He was born in Badanpur village of Madhuban area of Mau in eastern Uttar Pradesh, which is currently part of the district of Mau, situated on the banks of the Ghaghra River. Baleshwar is considered the first superstar of Bhojpuri world, many of his songs were copied in Bollywood.

His major popular songs are as follows:

- Saiya saajan
- Sasura Me Jayabu
- Dushman mile severe lekin matlabi yaar na mile
- Hum koileri chali jaib e lalmuniya ke mai
- Bikai A Babu BA Pass ghoda
- Chali a Dhaniya Dadari k mela
- Babu k muh Jaise Faizabadi Banda, Dahej me mange le Hero Honda
- Pan kha la munni sadhe tin baje munni

Tin baje munni Jarur Milan, sadhe tin baje

Baleshwar Yadav has written this song, after getting inspired, Anjaan included the song in Amitabh Bachchan's film 'Aaj Ka Arjun'- Chali Aana Tu Paan ki Dukan pe Sadhe Tin Baje. Baleshwar Yadav last performed in Suriname in 2008.

== Awards ==
He was awarded the Yash Bharti Award in 1994 for his outstanding contribution to the music field. He was also awarded Maati Ratan Samman by Shaheed Shodha Sansthan.
