= Shivpujan Sahay =

Indian Hindi novelist (1893–1963)

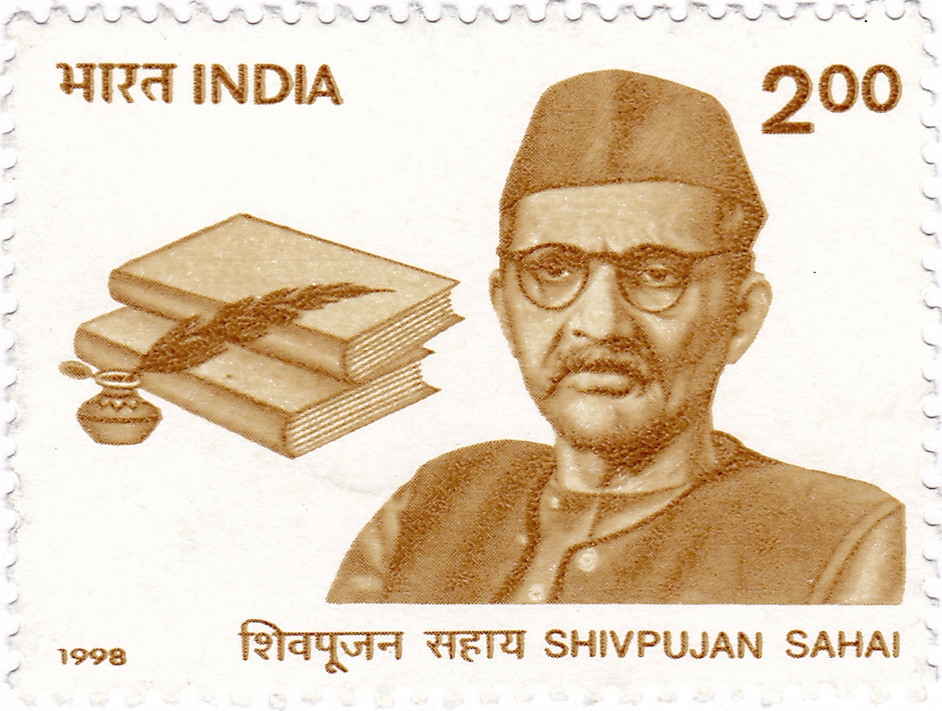
- Born: Acharya Shivpujan Sahay; 9 August 1893; Unwas, Bengal Presidency, British India (Now in Bihar, India)
- Died: 21 January 1963 (aged 69); Patna, Bihar, India
- Occupations: Novelist; editor; poet; writer
- Writing career
- Notable works: Shipujan Rachanavali, Mata ka Anchal
- Notable awards: Padma Bhushan (1960)

Acharya Shivpujan Sahay (9 August 1893 – 21 January 1963) was a noted Hindi and Bhojpuri novelist, editor and prose writer. He contributed in pioneering modern trends. His auto-biographical story "Mata ka Aanchal" ("Mother's Embrace") also featured in the NCERT Hindi textbook, Kritika, for the tenth grade. He was also conferred with the Padma Bhushan award by the Government of India.

== Personal life ==
Shivpujan Sahay was born in a land-owning, Kayastha family in the Unwas village of Buxar, Bihar on 9 August 1893. His childhood name was 'Bholanath'.

== Education and career ==
After his early education and a short stint as a Hindi language teacher at Ara (1903–1921), Acharya Shivpujan Sahay went to Kolkata to edit 'Marwari Sudhar' and then joined Matwala as an Editor in 1923. He moved to Lucknow in 1924 to join the editorial department of Dularelal Bhargava's Madhuri where he worked with noted Hindi author Munshi Premchand and edited his Rangbhumi and some of his other stories.

In 1925, he returned to Calcutta and engaged in editing short-lived journals such as Samanway, Mauji, Golmal, Upanyas Tarang. Finally, Sahay moved to Varanasi (Kāśi) in 1926 to work as a freelance editor. For a short period in 1931, he went to Sultanganj near Bhagalpur to edit Ganga. However, he returned to Varanasi in 1932 where he was commissioned to edit Jagaran, a literary fortnightly brought out by Jaishankar Prasad and his circle of friends. Sahay once again found himself working with Premchand. He also went on to become a prominent member of the Nagari Pracharini Sabha and similar literary circles in Varanasi.

In 1935, he moved to Laheria Sarai with his family (Darbhanga) to work as editor of Balak and other publications of Pustak Bhandar owned by Acharya Ramlochan Saran. In 1939, he joined Rajendra College, Chhapra as a Professor of Hindi Language. In 1946, on a year's leave, he moved to Patna to edit Himalaya, a literary monthly which was published by Pustak Bhandar owned by Acharya Ramlochan Saran.

In 1950, Sahay finally came to Patna to work as Secretary of Bihar Rashtra Bhasha Parished, a government academy where he edited and published more than 50 volumes of Hindi reference works. Later he became Director of the Parishad and compiled and edited Hindi Sahitya Aur Bihar a literary history. He retired from Parishad in 1959.

His own works were compiled and published in 4 volumes of Shipujan Rachanavali (1956–59) by the Parishad. Later, after his death, his complete works were edited and published by his son Prof. Mangal Murty as 'Shivapoojan Sahay Sahitya samagra'(2011) in 10 volumes. Shivpujan Sahay is also remembered for his editing of several literary commemoration volumes, chiefly Dwivedi Abhinandan Granth (1933),Anugrah Abhinandan Granth (1946), Rajendra Abhinandan Granth (1950) and Jayanti Smarak Granth (1942). He also edited Dr. Rajendra Prasad's Atmakatha. He was awarded Padma Bhushan in 1960.

== Works by Acharya Shivpujan Sahay ==
=== Stories and novels ===
- Wey Din Wey Log – 1965
- Bimb:Pratibimb – 1967
- Mera Jeevan – 1985
- Smritishesh – 1994
- Hindi Bhasha Aur Sahitya – 1996
- Gram Sudhar – 2007
- Dehati Duniya – 1926
- Vibhuti – 1935
- Mera Bachapan – 1960
- Amar Senani Veer Kunwar Singh- 1962
- Mata ka anchal

=== Edited works ===
- Dwivedi Abhinandan Granth – 1933
- Rajendra Abhinandan Granth – 1950
- Anugrah Abhinandan Granth – 1946
- Jayanti Smarak Granth – 1942
- Bihar ki Mahilayen (Rajendra Abhinandan Granth) – 1962
- Atmakatha – 1947
- Rangbhumi – 1925
- Samanway – 1925
- Mauji – 1925
- Golmaal- 1925
- Jagaran – 1932
- Balak – 1930
- Himalaya- 1946
- Hindi Sahitya Aur Bihar- 1962
- Madhuri- 1924

=== Bhojpuri ===
- Kundan Singh-Kesar Bai (Short Story)

== Death ==
He died in Patna on 21 January 1963. His posthumously published books are Wey Din Wey Log (1965), Mera Jeevan (1985), Smritishesh (1994), Hindi Bhasha Aur Sahitya (1996), and Gram Sudhar (2007) and 'Shivapoojan Sahay Sahitya Samagra' (10 Vols.)
