= Chandan Tiwari =

Indian folk singer

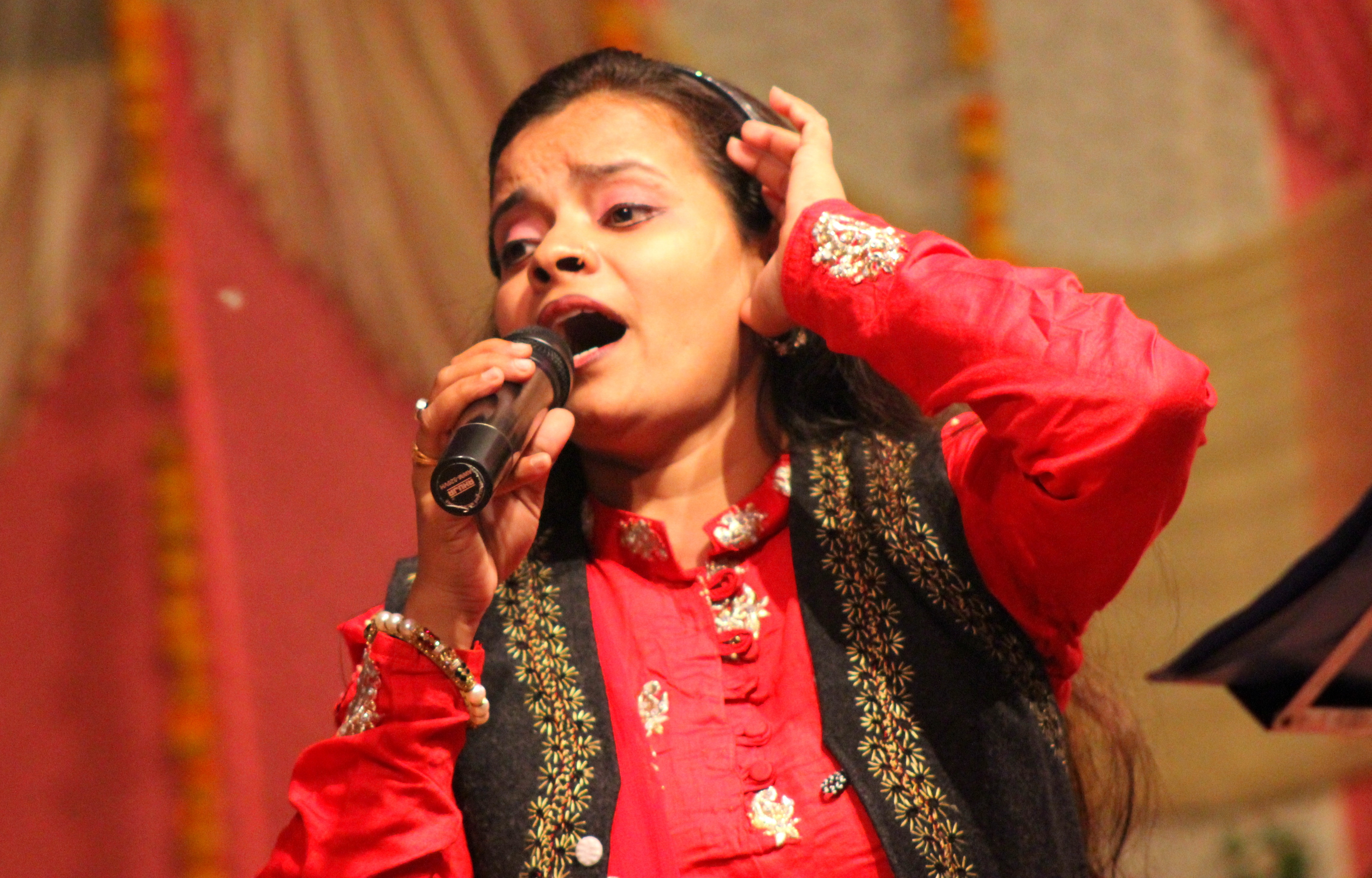
- Born: Bhojpur, Bihar
- Education: Vinoba Bhave University, BA (Hons) Psychology
- Occupation: Singer
- Known for: Folk singer
- Awards: Sangeet Natak Akademi Award

Chandan Tiwari is an Indian folk singer from Bihar. She is known as folk singer and sings in Bhojpuri, Nagpuri, Awadhi and Hindi. She was awarded Sangeet Natak Academy-Bismillah Khan Samman. She was honoured by Bhojpuri Kokila in Kolkata. BAG Films-News 24 awarded her best traditional folk singer. She appeared in India Today Magazine in cover story for her contributions to Indian folk music. She has been singing in various forms of folks like Purabi Sohar, Pachra Gandhi song, River Song, Chhath Song Kajri and Thumri.

== Early life ==
Chandan Tiwari was born in Badka Gaon, Bhojpur district, Bihar, India. She was raised in Chas Bokaro, Jharkhand. She has completed BA Honours in Anthropology from Vinoba Bhave University, Hazaribagh. She also has Six year Prabhakar from Prayag Sangeet Samiti, Allahabad. She is doing research project on rare and rural Bhojpuri song for Maithili and Bhojpuri Academy, Govt of Delhi.

== Career ==
Chandan Tiwari is a Folk singer singing in Bhojpuri, maithili, Magahi, Awadhi, Nagpuri (especially in Bhojpuri language). She has done many special musical shows on Doordarshan including special shows on My Musical Effort and series like Purabiyataan & Nimiya chiraiyan ke baser. She had participated in Jila Top & Sur Sangram on Mahuaa T.V. She took part in ETV folk jalwa show. Along with Big Magic Ganga T.V. She has done many special shows of Bhakti Sagar. With All India Radio Patna she has done Special Folk and Ghajal Recording shows. She has always stood in favour of participation of women and women empowerment in folk songs.

Chandan Tiwari was one of the Team members of Big Magic Ganga TV show "Rang Purwaiya". She is actively participating in various forms of art.

== Performances ==
- Bhoojal Bhaat Music fest- A folk fest organized by Netherland Indian society, held at Amsterdam
- Gandhi Sangeet Mahotsav, organized by Government of Bihar, held at Gyan Bhavan, Patna
- Bihar Diwas Samaroh, organized by Government of Bihar, held at SK Memorial Hall, Patna
- Bihar Mahotsav, organized by Government of Bihar, held at Goa
- Gandhi Sangeet Mahotsav, organized by Central University of Gujarat, held at Gandhinagar, Gujarat
- Biharnama, organized by Bihar Museum, held at Bihar Museum, Patna
- Gandhi Sangeet Sandhya, organized by Delhi Govt, held at Hindi Bhavan, Delhi
- Bhojpuri Mahotsav, organized by Madhya Pradesh Govt, held at Bharat Bhavan, Bhopal
- Kajari Mahotsav, organized by Madhya Pradesh Govt, held at Rewa (M.P.)
- Mahendar Misir Smriti Utsav, organized by Madhya Pradesh Govt, held at Sarani-Baitul (M.P)
- Bihar Diwas Mahotsav, organized by Karnataka, held at Bengaluru
- Sanskritik Kumbh, organized by Government of Uttar Pradesh, held at Kumbh Mela, Uttarpradesh
- Folk Fest, organized by Mahatama Gandhi Antarrashtriya Vishwavidyalaya, held at wardha, Maharashtra
- Bihar Diwas Sangeet samaroh, organized by Government of Bihar, held at S. K. Memorial Hall, Patna
- Veer Kuwar Singh Sangeet Mahotsav, organized by Madhya Pradesh Govt, held at Itarasi
- Ek Sham Gandhi Ke name, organized by Adani Foundation, held at Book fair, Deoghar
- Itkhori Mahotsav, organized by Government of Jharkhand, held at Itkhori, Jharkhand
- Guru Samman Sangeet Mahotsav, organized by Prabhat Khabar, held at Daltonganj, Jharkhand
- Sur Sammad Mahotsav, organized by Darbhanga University, held at Darbhanga
- Gandhi Sangeet Mahotsav, organized by Govt of India, held at JNU, New Delhi
- Centenary year festival of B.H.U, Varanasi, held at Swatantrata Bhavan, B.H.U campus, Varanasi
- Ganhi jee- Gandhi Geet Mahotsav held at Mahatama Gandhi Anatrrashtriya Hindi Vishwavidyalaya, Wardha
- Lok Kala Sanskriti Mahotsav, Ghazipur (Uttarpradesh)
- Lok Rang Mahotsav, Kushinagar (Uttarpradesh)
- LokRasDhaar-River songs Fest organised by Vikas Bharati and held at Ranchi, Jharkhand
- Purabiyataan held at Premchand Rangshala, Patna
- Bhojpuri Mahotsav organised by Bhojpriya foundation, held at Vishakhapatnam
- SaajhiRaag-SaajhaRang, musical fest organised by Paridhi on the occasion of srijan mela and held at kala Kendra, Bhagalpur
- NOBA international meet musical evening, organised by Netarhat Old Boys association
- Bhikhari Thakur Sangeet Mahotsav, organised by Akhil Vishwa Bhojpuri manch and held at Jamshedpur

== Singing work ==
Purabia Ustad, Beti Chiraiya Saman, Radha Rasiya, Sabake Ram (Rasool), Basanti Bayar, Shiv Jogia, Sajhi Raag, Sawani Bahar, Nirgunia Kabir, Ganhi Jee, Nadia Dheere Baho, Voice of Ganges, Maai, Chhathi Maiya, Rang kalasha, Charakhwa Chalu Rahe, Janta Geet, Jan Raag, Duniya Kayamba kisan se, Batohiya, Barah Masa, Kunwar Geet, Sohar-Mangal-Badhai, Suhag Raag, Chaita-Chaiti-Ghato, Bal Geet, Folk Lok.

== Social musical works ==
- Doing work on child folk songs and folk tales with children of Aanchal Shishu Ashram (an Orphanage)
- With Zuban Band (IIT Mumbai) preserving & promoting rare and pure folk
- Nadi Geet series (Nadia Dhire Baho & Ganga maai..) with Ganga Jagran Abhiyan
- In Process to develop a platform Named LOKRAAG for rural, new & forbidden artists, where they can explicitly express their ideas, notions & Skills about folk

== Awards ==
- Bismillah Khan Samman Sangeet Natak Academi Award by Government of India
- Vindhyawasini Devi Bihar Kala Samman by Government of Bihar
- Bhojpuri Kokila Samman by Pashchim Bang Bhojpuri Parishad, Kolkata
- Best Traditional Folk Singer Award By News-24 & Radio Dhamal B.A.G Films
- Changemaker Icon of Bihar by Government of Bihar
- Bahin-Bahinpa Samman, Sur Sammad, Darbhanga
- Acharya Lakshamikant Vajpeyee Samman, Munger
- Lok Ratna Samman, Gazhipur
- Aakhar Samman, Siwan
- Girija Devi Sangeet Samman, Balia
- Gandhi Sangeet Samman, Gandhi Smriti Darshan Samiti
- Bhikhari Thakur Samman, Jamshedpur
- Lok Ras Samman, Vikas Bharati, Ranchi
- Bhojpuria Ratna Samman, Bhopal
