= Heera Dom =

Bhojpuri Poet

- Born: 1885; Danapur, Bihar
- Died: Unknown
- Occupation: Poet
- Writing career
- Notable work: Acchut kee Shikayat (1914)

Heera Dom was a Bhojpuri poet who contributed to Dalit Literature. He is credited with creating the first poem about the Dalits. The poem was Acchut Kee Shiqayat, which was printed in the "Saraswati" published in Allahabad in 1914.

== Life ==
He was a Dalit poet from the Domra or Dom caste which is one of the lowest ranked castes in Hindu caste system. He was born in 1885 in Danapur in Bihar. Some scholars also claim that he was from Varanasi.

== "Acchut Kee Shiqayat" ==
"Acchut ki Shiqayat" (Bhojpuri: 𑂃𑂓𑂳𑂞 𑂍𑂵 𑂮𑂱𑂍𑂰𑂉𑂞; IAST: achūt kī śikayat; transl. The complaint of an Untouchable) is written in Bhojpuri. It was published in the Hindi magazine Saraswati in 1914 from Allahabad. In this poem, Dom has expressed the trauma of his Dom community in literary form.

The first and second stanza of the poem are as follows:

Kaithi Alphabet

𑂯𑂧𑂢𑂲 𑂍𑂵 𑂩𑂰𑂞𑂱 𑂠𑂱𑂢 𑂠𑂳𑂎𑂫𑂰 𑂦𑂷𑂏𑂞 𑂥𑂰𑂢𑂲,
𑂯𑂧𑂢𑂲 𑂍𑂵 𑂮𑂯𑂵𑂥 𑂮𑂵 𑂧𑂱𑂢𑂞𑂲 𑂮𑂳𑂢𑂰𑂅𑂥𑂱

𑂯𑂧𑂢𑂲 𑂍𑂵 𑂠𑂳𑂎 𑂦𑂏𑂫𑂰𑂢𑂋𑂁 𑂢 𑂠𑂵𑂎ऽ𑂞𑂰 𑂞𑂵,
𑂯𑂧𑂢𑂲 𑂍𑂵 𑂍𑂥𑂪𑂵 𑂍𑂪𑂵𑂮𑂫𑂰 𑂇𑂘𑂰𑂅𑂥𑂱

𑂣𑂠𑂩𑂲 𑂮𑂯𑂵𑂥 𑂍𑂵 𑂍𑂒𑂯𑂩𑂲 𑂧𑂵𑂁 𑂔𑂰𑂅𑂥𑂱𑂔𑂰𑂁,
𑂥𑂵𑂡𑂩𑂧 𑂯𑂷𑂍𑂵 𑂩𑂁𑂏𑂩𑂵𑂔 𑂥𑂰𑂢𑂱 𑂔𑂰𑂅𑂥𑂱𑂔𑂰𑂁

𑂯𑂰𑂨 𑂩𑂰𑂧! 𑂡𑂮𑂩𑂧 𑂢 𑂓𑂷𑂚𑂞 𑂥𑂢𑂞 𑂥𑂰 𑂔𑂵,
𑂥𑂵-𑂡𑂩𑂧 𑂯𑂷𑂍𑂵 𑂍𑂶𑂮𑂵 𑂧𑂳𑂁𑂯𑂫𑂰 𑂠𑂱𑂎𑂅𑂥𑂱

Devnagari script
हमनी के राति दिन दुखवा भोगत बानी,

हमनी के सहेब से मिनती सुनाइबि

हमनी के दुख भगवानओं न देखता ते, हमनी के कबले कलेसवा उठाइबि

पदरी सहेब के कचहरी में जाइबिजां, बेधरम होके रंगरेज बानि जाइबिजां

हाय राम! धसरम न छोड़त बनत बा जे, बे-धरम होके कैसे मुंहवा दिखइबि

IAST transliteration

hamanī ke rāti din dukhawā bhogata bānī
hamanī ke sāheba se minatī sunāibi

hamanī ke dukhawā bhagawanao nā dekh'tā te
hamanī ke kabale kalesawā uthāibi

padarī sāheba ke kacaharī me jāibijā
bedharama hoke raṃgreja bani jāibijā

hāya rāma! dhasarama nā choḍata banata bā je
bedharama hoke kaise muhawā dekhāibijā

(Bhojpuri)
