= Raj Mohan =

Bhojpuri singer

Raj Mohan राज मोहन
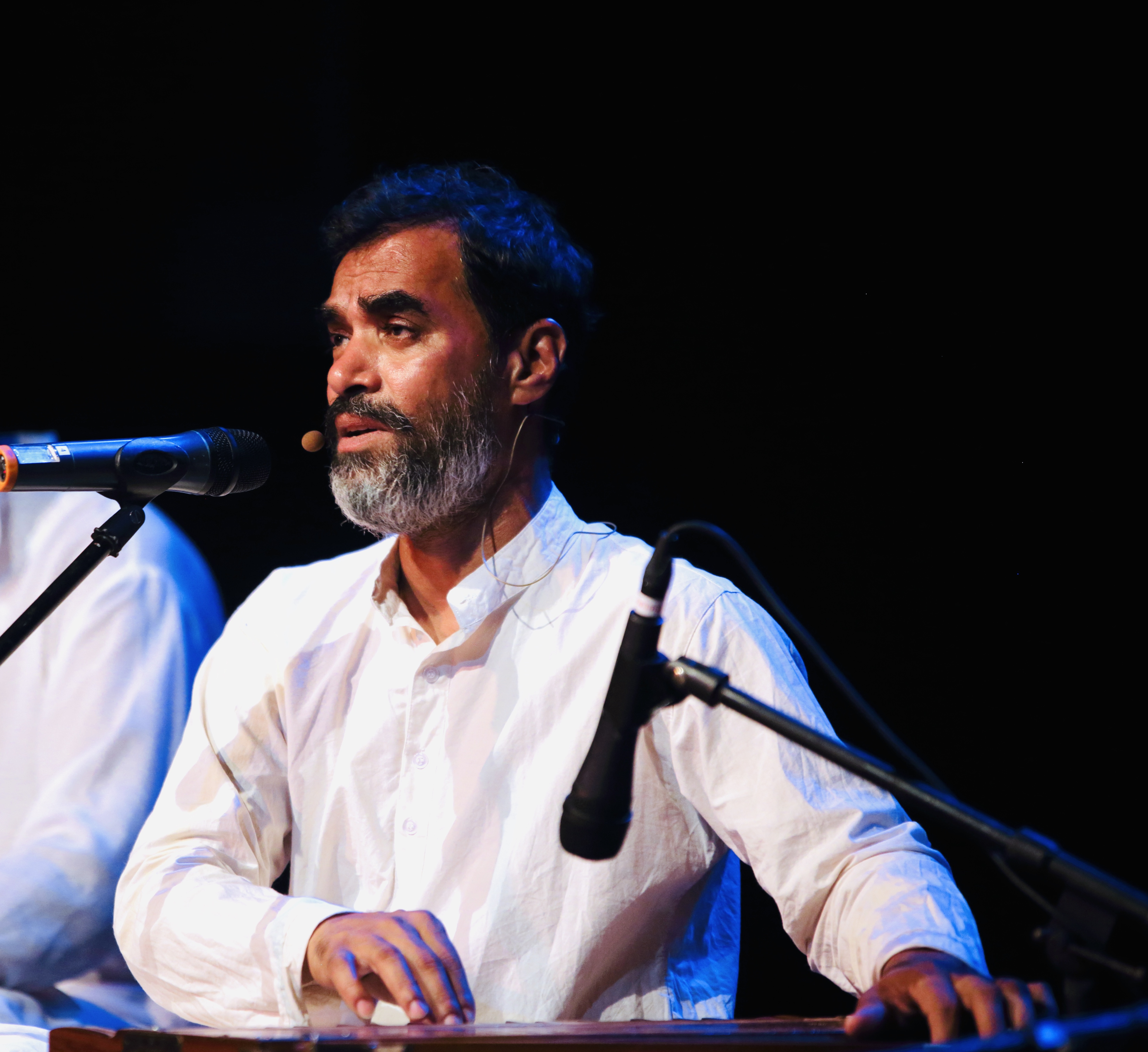

Background information
- Born: Raj Mohan; 28 August 1964 (age 61); Paramaribo, Suriname
- Genres: Pop, Bhajan, Geet, Ghazal
- Occupation: Singer
- Years active: 1988–present

Raj Mohan (born 28 August 1964), is a Dutch-Surinamese singer and songwriter, who sings in Sarnámi. In 2011 he released his first pop album with Sarnámi lyrics together with Hindi songs and poems which he all wrote and composed himself. It is the first time in Surinamese history that Sarnámi is utilized in this contemporary form. Raj Mohan invented the Sarnámi Geet in the Geet & Ghazal style which was appreciated worldwide with his album ‘Kantráki’ (2005).

== Early life and career ==
Raj is a 5th generation Bihari - Indian-Surinamese, his ancestors were taken to Suriname as indentured labourers by the British. He was raised in Utrecht, Netherlands and displayed musical talent at an early age.

At the age of 12, Mohan moved to the Netherlands from Suriname with his parents.
