= Dev Deepavali (Varanasi) =

Hindu festival

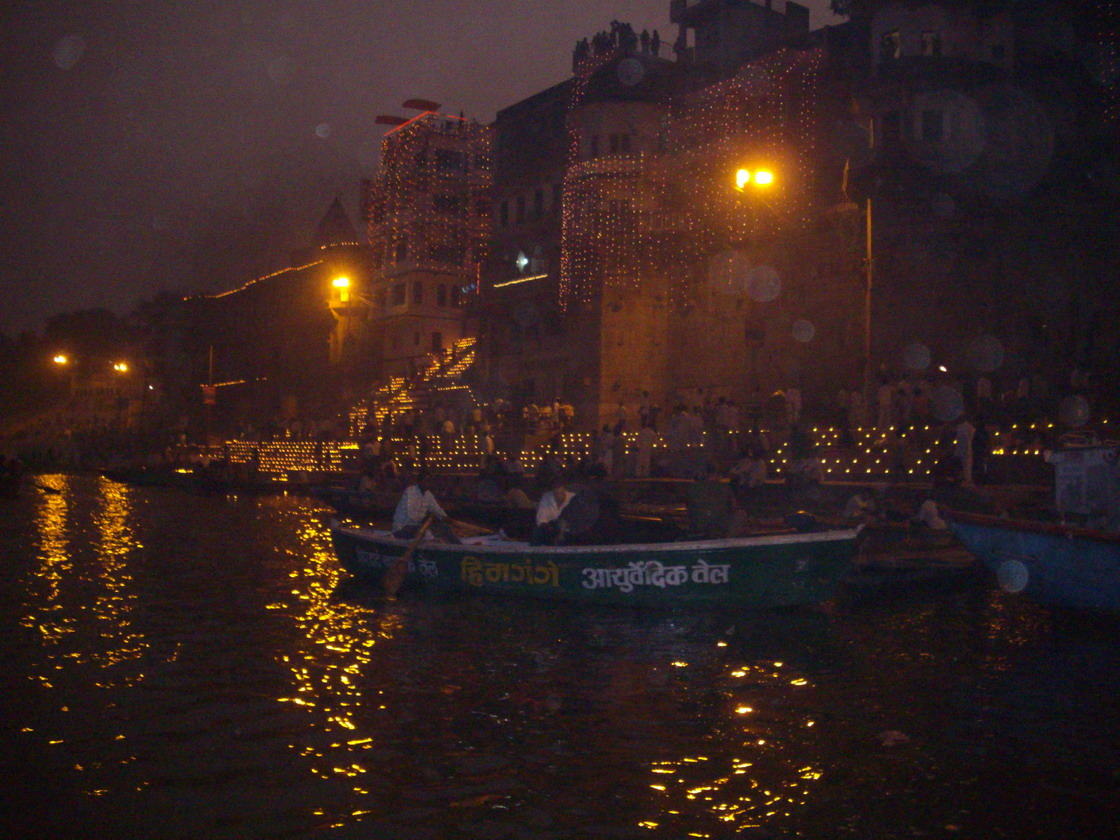
- A ghat on the Ganges lit on the festival, 2011
- Observed by: Hindus
- Type: Varanasi
- Significance: Tripura Purnima or worship of Shiva
- Celebrations: Gods descent to the Ganga ghats at Varanasi and aarti for the Ganga River
- Date: Full Moon day of the Kartik month in the Hindu calendar
- 2026 date: 24 November

The Dev Deepavali (lit. 'the Diwali of the Gods', 'Festival of Lights of the Gods') is the festival of Kartik Poornima celebrated in the city of Varanasi, in the Bhojpuri region of Uttar Pradesh, India. It falls on the full moon of the Hindu month of Kartika (November - December) and takes place fifteen days after Diwali. The steps of all the ghats on the riverfront of the Ganges River, from Ravidas Ghat at the southern end to Rajghat, are lit with more than a million earthen lamps (diyas) in honour of Ganga, the Ganges, and its presiding goddess. Mythologically, the gods are believed to descend to Earth to bathe in the Ganges on this day. The festival is also observed as Tripura Purnima Snan. The tradition of lighting the lamps on the Dev Deepawali festival day was first started at the Dashashwamedh Ghat by Pandit Kishori Raman Dubey (Babu Maharaj) in 1991.

During Dev Deepawali, houses are decorated with oil lamps and coloured designs on their front doors. Processions of decorated deities are taken out into the streets of Varanasi, and oil lamps are set afloat on the river.

== Rituals ==
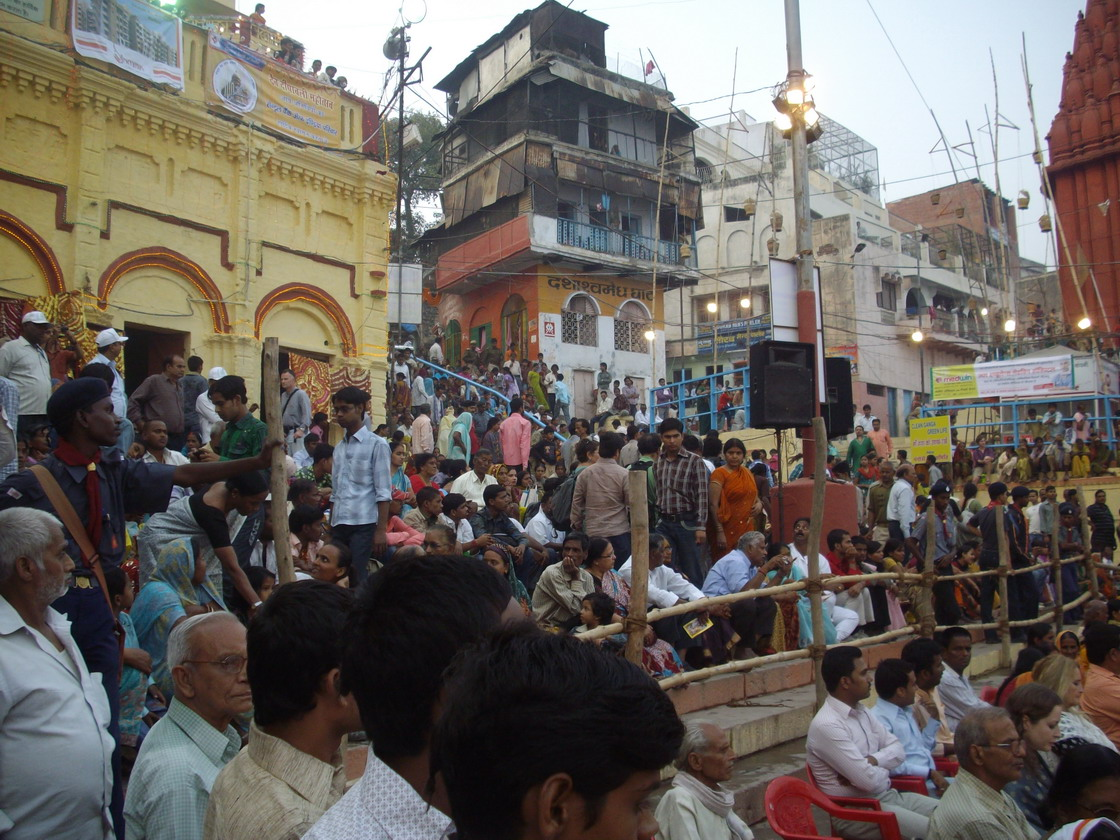
Crowds gather to watch the riverside festivities.

The main rituals performed by devotees consist of kartik snan (taking a holy bath in the Ganges during Kartika) and deepdan (offering of oil lighted lamps) to Ganga in the evening. The Ganga aarti is also performed in the evening.

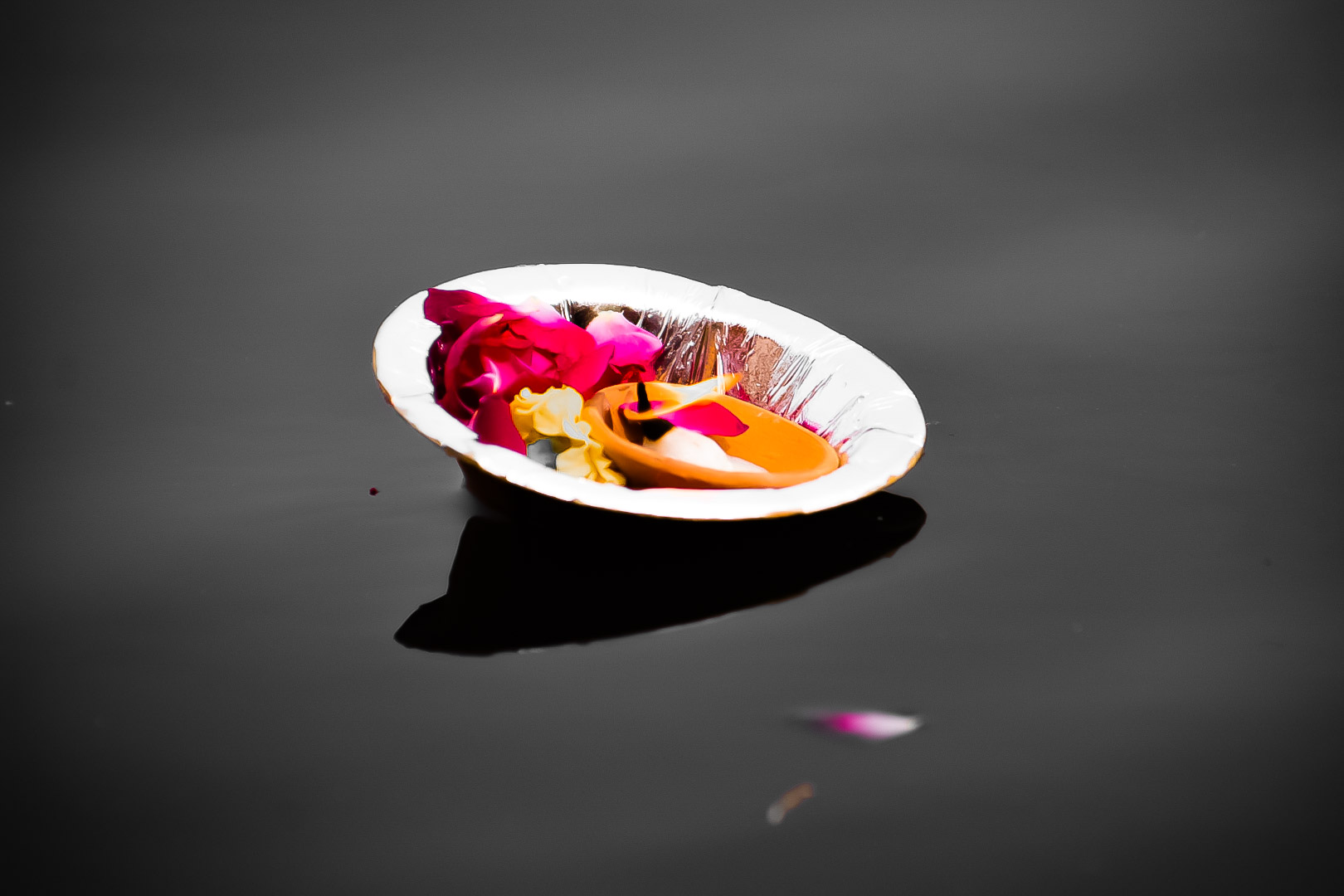
Deepdan

The 5 day festivals starts on Prabodhini Ekadashi (11th lunar day of Kartika) and concludes on Kartik Poornima. Besides a religious role, the festival is also the occasion when the martyrs are remembered at the ghats by worshipping Ganga and lighting lamps watching the aarti. This is organized by Gangotri seva samiti when wreaths are placed at Amar Jawan Jyoti at Dashashwamedh Ghat and also at the adjoining Rajendra Prasad Ghat by police officials of the Varanasi District, 39 Gorkha Training Centre, 95 CRPF battalion, 4 Air Force Selection Board and 7 UP battalion of NCC (naval), Benares Hindu University (BHU). The traditional last post is also performed by all the three armed forces (Army, Navy and Air force), followed by a closing ceremony, where sky lamps are lit. Patriotic songs, hymns, and bhajans are sung and the Bhagirath Shourya Samman awards are presented.

The festival is a major tourist attraction, and the sight of a million lamps (both floating and fixed) lighting the ghats and river in vivid colors have often been described by visitors and tourists as a breathtaking sight. On the night of the festival, thousands of devotees from the holy city of Varanasi, surrounding villages, and across the country gather in the evening on the ghats of the Ganges to watch the aarti. The local government makes several intensive security arrangements to ensure order during the festival.

Apart from the aarti at the Dashameshwar Ghat, all buildings and houses are lit with earthen lamps. Nearly 100,000 pilgrims visit the riverfront to watch the river aglitter with lamps. The aarti is performed by 21 young Brahmin priests and 24 young women. The rituals involve chanting hymns, rhythmic drum beating, conch shell blowing, and brazier burning.

Boat rides (in boats of all sizes) along the riverfront in the evening are popular among tourists, when all the ghats are lit with lamps and aarti is being performed.

== Ganga Mahotsav ==
Ganga Mahotsav is a tourist-centric festival in Varanasi, which is celebrated over five days every year, starting from Prabodhani Ekadashi to Kartik Poornima during the months of October and November. It showcases the rich cultural heritage of Varanasi. With its message of faith and culture, the festival features popular cultural programs, classical music, a country boat race, a daily shilp mela (arts and crafts fair), sculpture displays, and martial arts. On the final day (Poornima), which coincides with the traditional Dev Deepawali (light festival of the Gods), the ghats on the Ganga River glitter with more than a million lit-up earthen lamps.

== See also ==
- Igas Bagwal
