= Bhojpuri region =

Region in India

Bhojpur
- Region
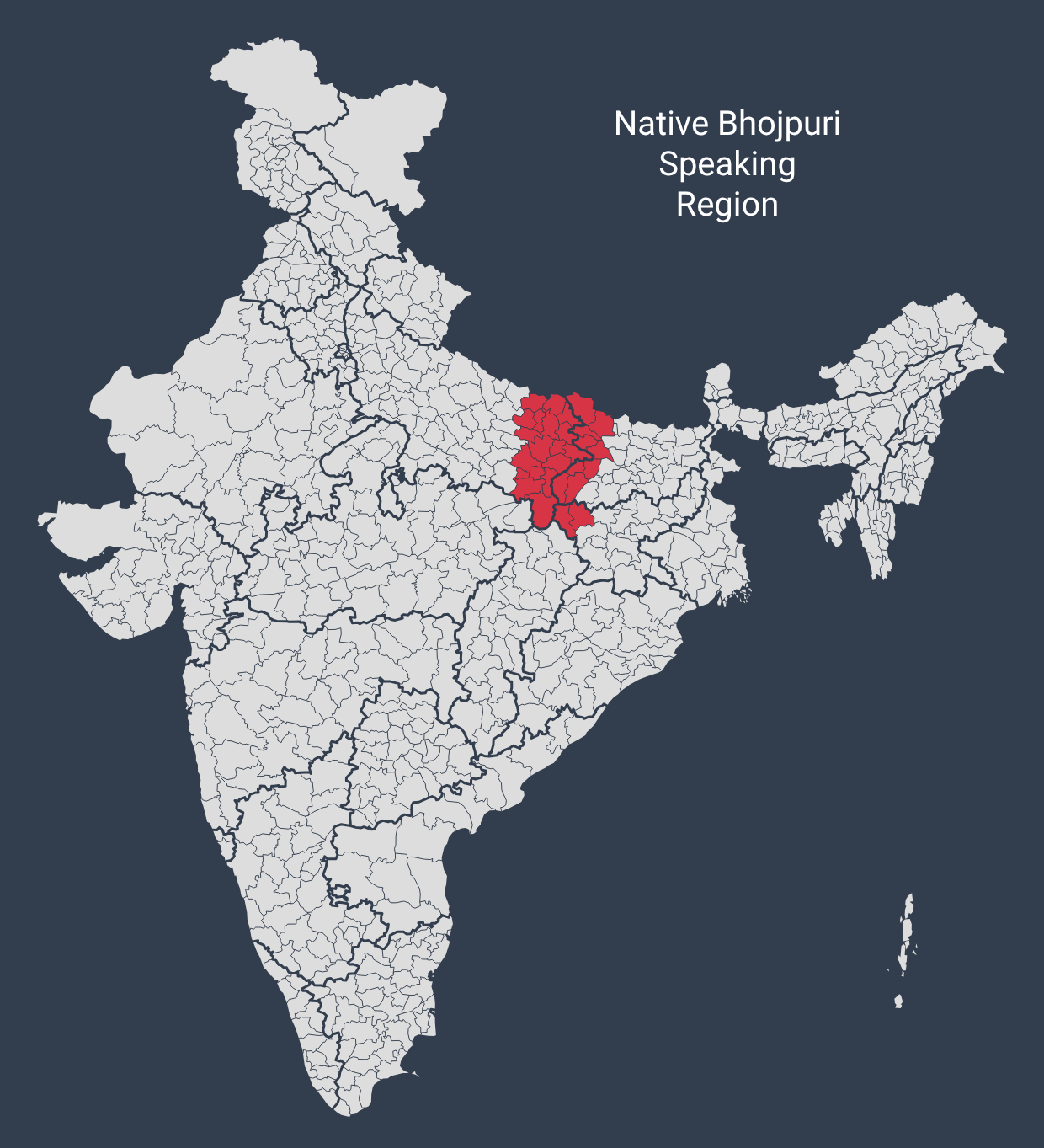
- Bhojpuri-speaking region of India
- Continent: Asia
- Country: India and Nepal
- State: Bihar, Uttar Pradesh, Jharkhand, Madhesh, Lumbini, Bagmati (Chitwan District), and Gandaki (Nawalpur District)
- Languages: Bhojpuri

Area
  - Total: 72,004 km^{2} (27,801 sq mi)

Population (2011)
  - Total: 76,308,751
  - Density: 1,059.8/km^{2} (2,744.8/sq mi)
- Largest Cities: Varanasi; Gorakhpur; Ranchi; Arrah; Birgunj; Sasaram; Chhapra; Mau; Jaunpur; Ballia; Bhabua

Bhojpuri region, or simply Bhojpur or sometimes Purbanchal, is an ethnolinguistic and cultural area in the Indian subcontinent where the Bhojpuri language is spoken as a mother tongue. The Bhojpuri region encompasses parts of the Indian states of Bihar, Uttar Pradesh, and Jharkhand, and the Madhesh, Gandaki and Lumbini provinces of Nepal.

== History ==
=== Pre-history and Antiquity ===
The earliest known evidence of Human settlement in the region are the Cave painting of Kaimur. The first Neolithic settlement found in this region is in Chirand of Saran, which dates back 2500–1500 BC and is contemporary to the Harrapans. Historically, the region was part of Malla and Kashi Mahajanapadas. Varanasi, known as the center of the Bhojpuri cultural region is one of the world's oldest continuously inhabited cities.

== Etymology ==
The Bhojpuri region received its name after the town of Bhojpur (Arrah), the headquarters of the Ujjainiya Rajputs of the former Shahabad district of Bihar.

== Geography ==
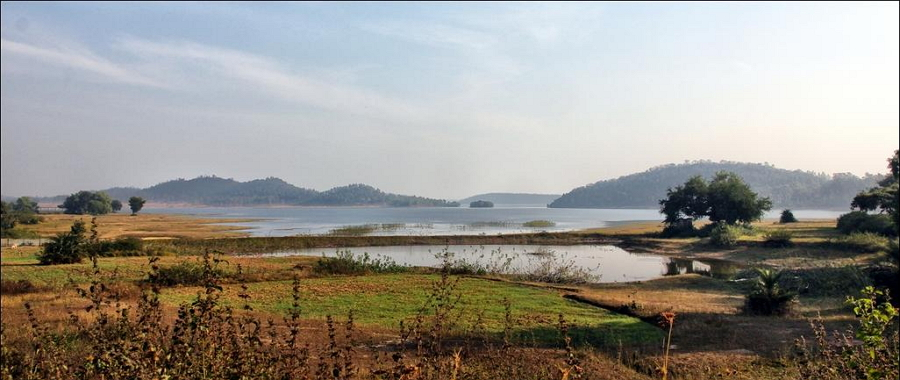
Himalayan Foot Hills of Northern Bhojpur

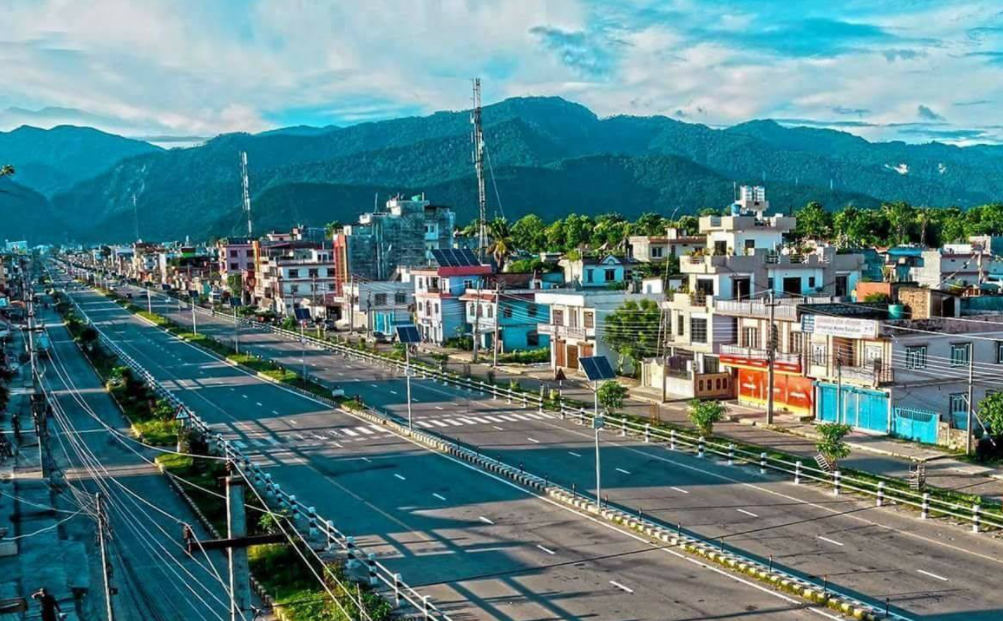
Shivalik Himalayas in Rupandehi

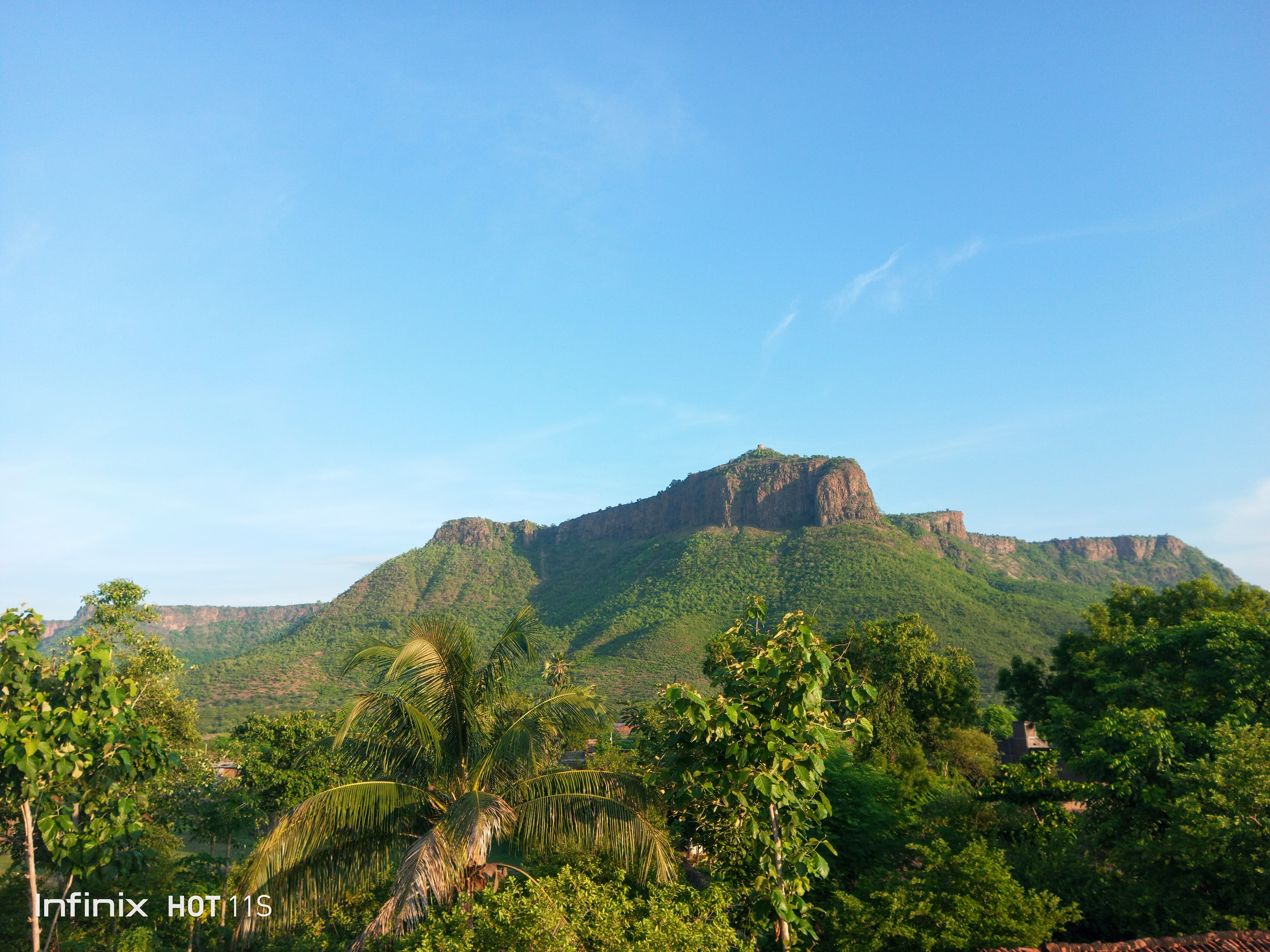
The Rohtas Plateau

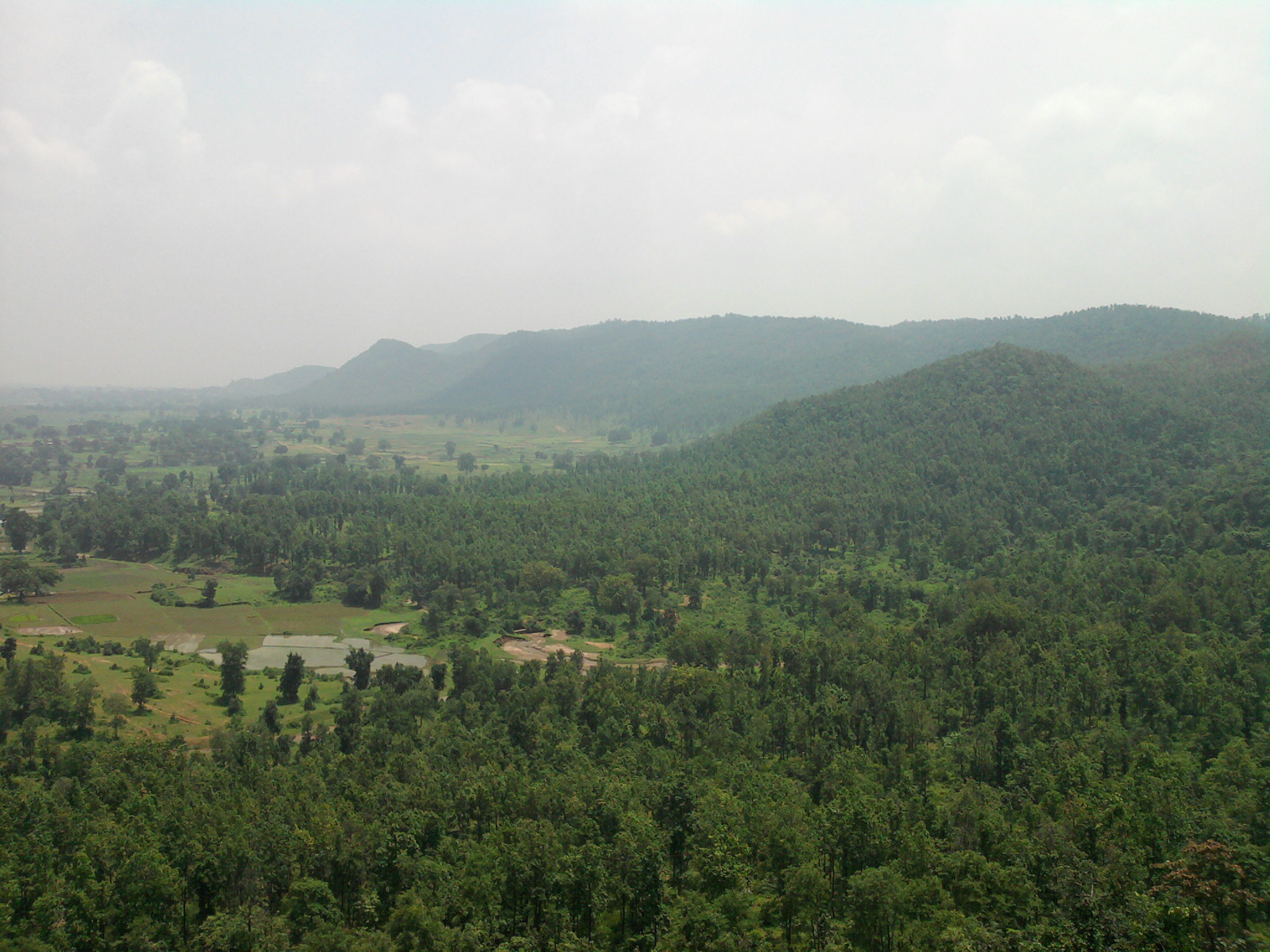
The Chhotanagpur Plateau in Southern Bhojpur

Most of the Bhojpuri region lies in the fertile Gangetic plains, with highlands present in its northern, southern, and southwestern areas. The northern part of Bhojpur includes the Shivalik range of the Himalayas, while the southern part includes the Kaimur range, Rohtas Plateau and Chhota Nagpur Plateau. The region is traversed by numerous rivers originating from the Himalayas, which enrich the soil and make it highly productive for agriculture. Additionally, several other rivers flowing through the region, originate from the Chhota Nagpur Plateau, as well as the Kaimur and Satpura ranges. These geographical features have profoundly influenced the cultural and historical development of Bhojpur.

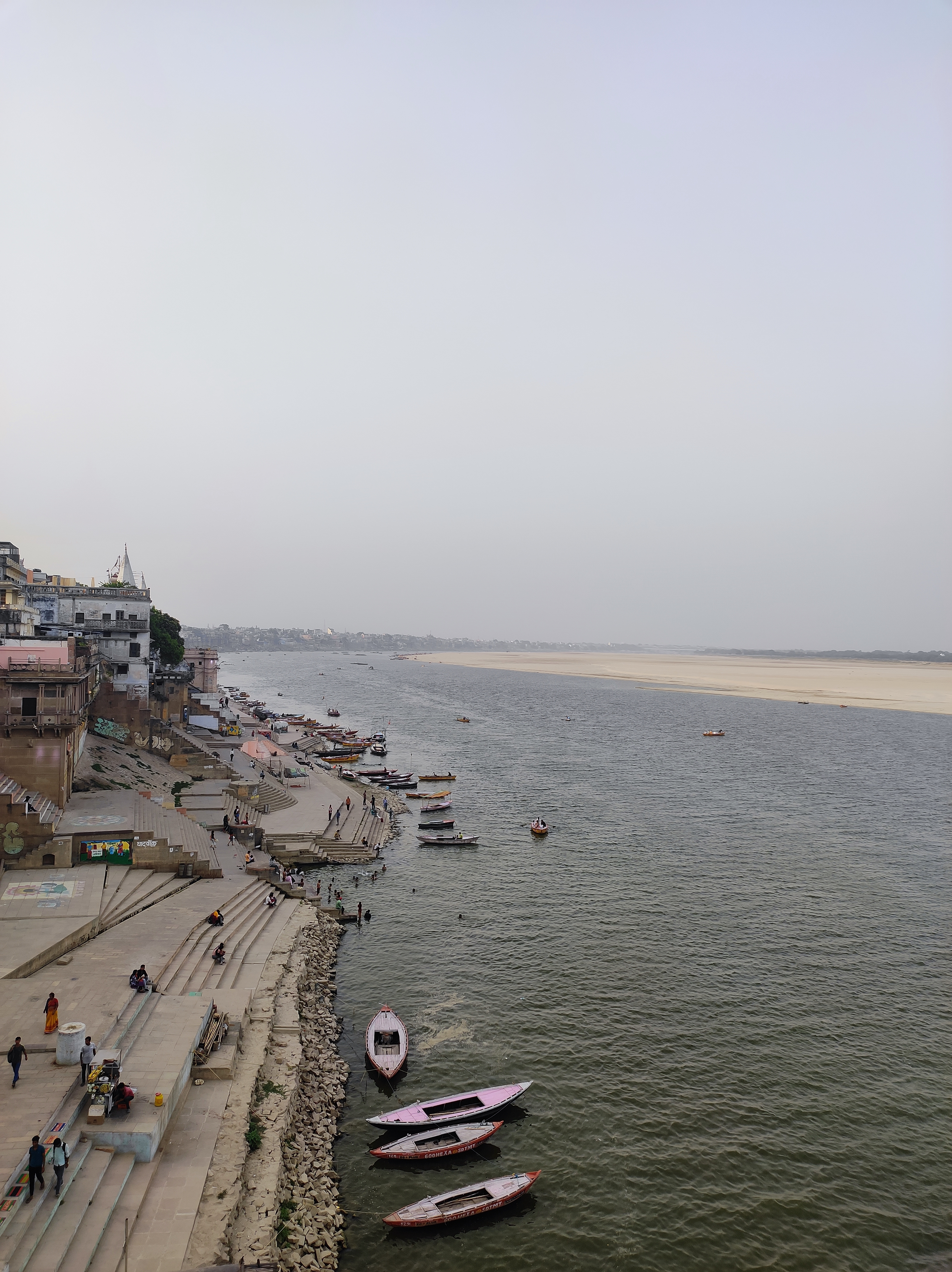
The Ganga in Varanasi

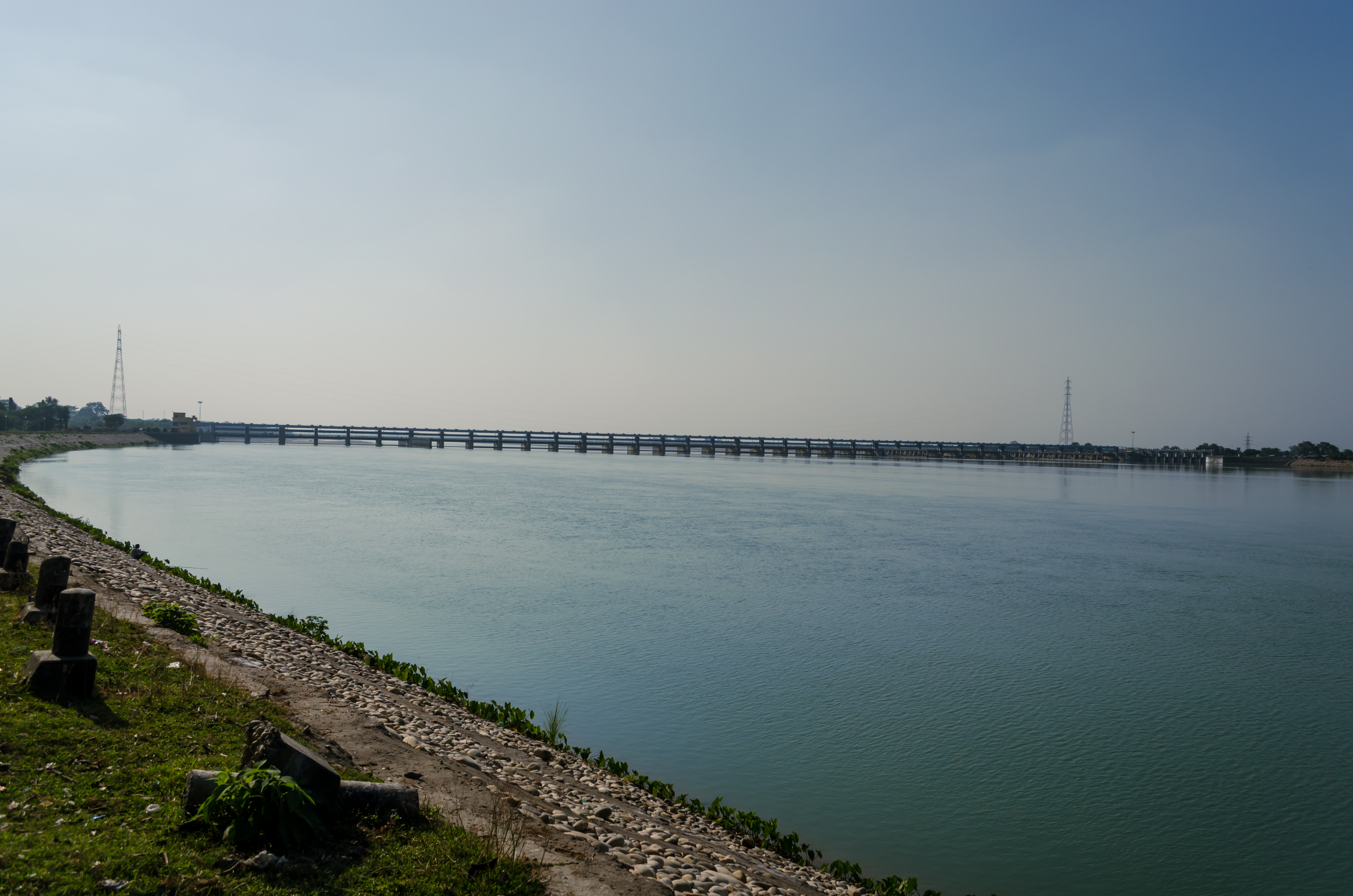
The Gandak River in Champaran

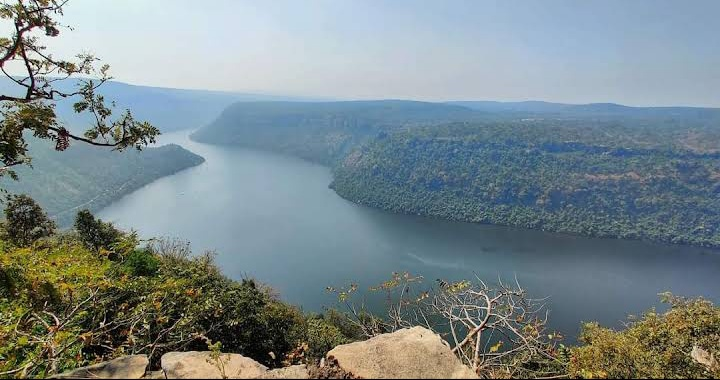
The Durgawati river

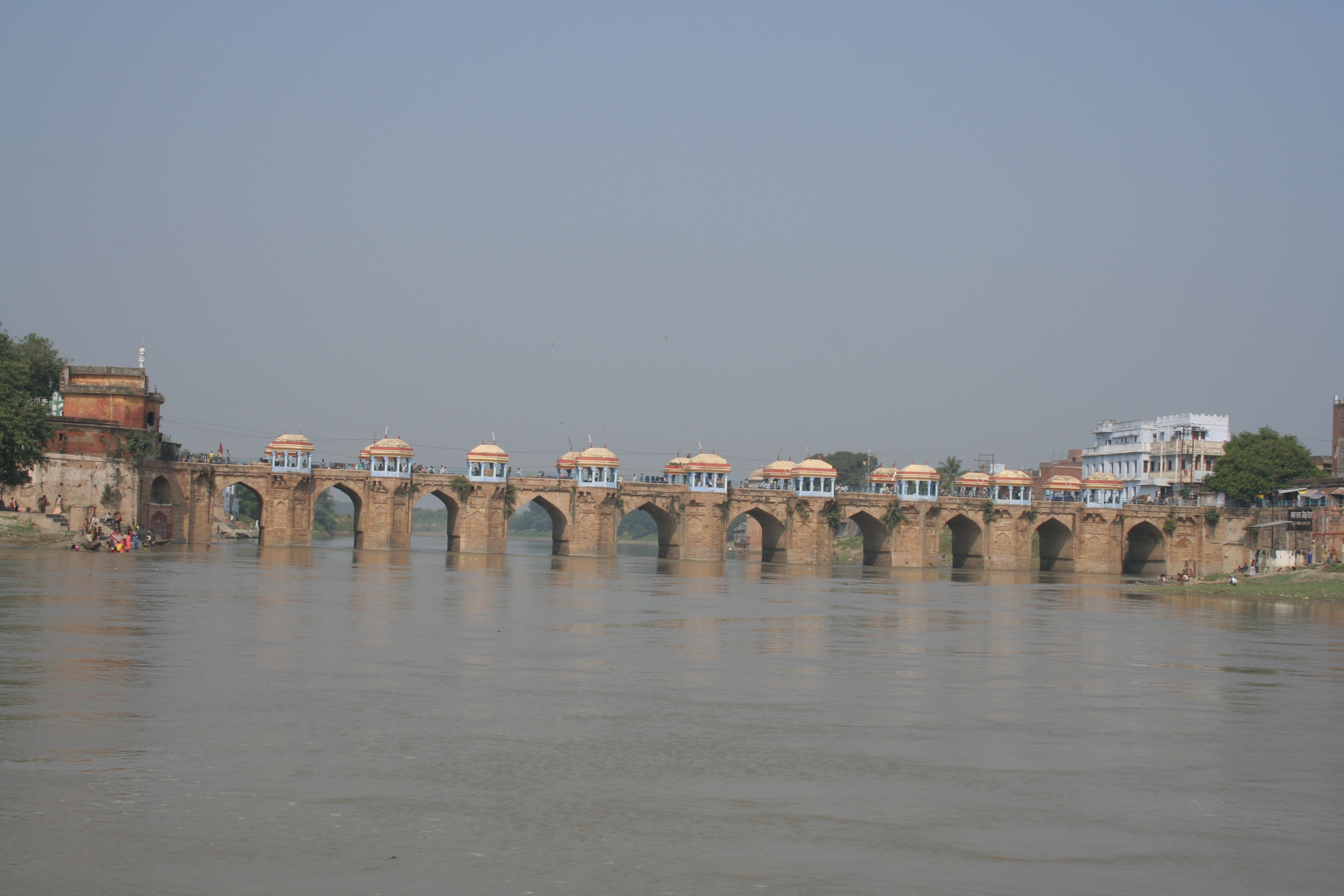
Shahi Bridge across Gomti in Jaunpur

The Bhojpur region is divided into two unequal halves by the Ganges River, which flows through the middle from west to east. On the northern side, rivers such as the Gandak, Ghaghara (Sarayu), Gomti, and Burhi Gandak merge with the Ganges, while on the southern side, rivers like the Sone and Karmnasa, flow into it. Other important rivers include the Rapti (a tributary of the Ghaghra), Durgavati (a tributary of the Karmnasa), North Koel, Rihand and Kanhar (tributaries of the Sone), and Sai (a tributary of the Gomti). All these rivers ultimately merge with the Ganges, which flows into the Bay of Bengal. The Subarnarekha River drains into the Bay of Bengal. The North Karo River flows into the South Koel, which then joins the Sankh River to form the Brahmani River, which also drains into the Bay of Bengal.

== People ==
The speakers of Bhojpuri language are called Bhojpuriyas and are an Indo-Aryan ethno-linguistic group. There are an estimated 150 million Bhojpuriyas worldwide, with the vast majority being Hindu.

== Culture ==
The economic and industrial growth of this region had been greatly hindered because of caste-guided political in-fighting and a huge population.

The culture of Bhojpur is also very much present today in Trinidad and Tobago, Jamaica, Guyana, Suriname, Fiji, Mauritius, and South Africa, due to the many Indian indentured laborers who were sent there by the ruling British in the mid 19th century to the early 20th century, and were from the Purvanchal-Bhojpur region.

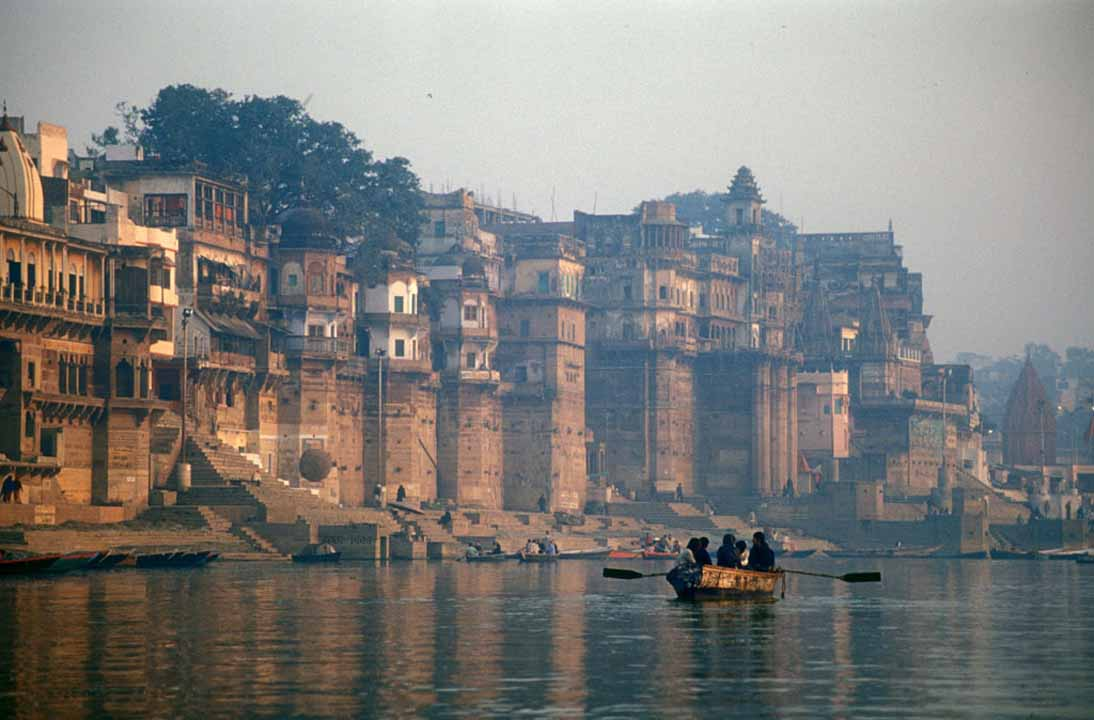
Ganga

=== Language ===
Bhojpuri language is a descendant of Magadhi Prakrit which started taking in shape during the reign of the Vardhana dynasty. Some scholar enthusiasts like to trace the earliest form of Bhojpuri in the Siddha Sahitya as early as 8th century A.D. It is an eastern Indo-Aryan language and one of the easternmost branches of the Indo-European language family. The Bhojpuri variant of Kaithi is the indigenous script of Bhojpuri language.

=== Music ===
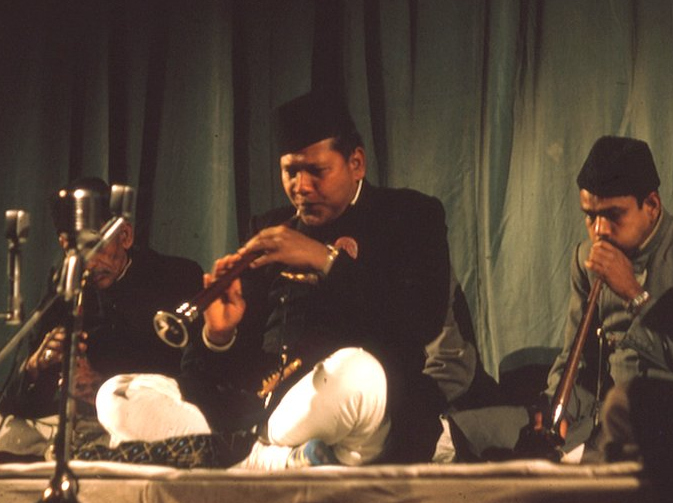
Bharat Ratna Ustad Bismillah Khan

Bhojpuri music is a form of Hindustani Classical Music and includes a broad array of Bhojpuri language performances in distinct style, both traditional and modern.

=== Art and Crafts ===
Bhojpuri painting is a folk painting style that has flourished in the Bhojpuri region thousands of years ago. This painting style is a type of wall painting primarily done on temple walls or on walls of the rooms of newly married couples and the main motifs are that of Lord Shiva and Goddess Parvati. Although in recent times motifs of natural objects and life and struggles of village people are also depicted to make the painting more acceptable among the common people and bring the style close to reality.

Sikki grass handicrafts

Sikki grass crafts are traditional items crafted from sikki grass, widely found in the Bhojpur region.

=== Attire ===
Men in the Bhojpuri region traditionally wear Dhoti, Ganji, Kurta, Lungi, and carry a Gamchha, often used as a turban (Muraitha). Women wear Sari (also called Luga) in Sojha Palla style. Daily attire is usually cotton, while Banarasi Sari is preferred for special occasions. On auspicious occasions, there is a tradition of wearing yellow garments, which are called Piyari. Men wear Piyari dhoti paired with a Piyari ganji and kurta, while women wear a Piyari sari.

The Bhojpuri region is renowned for its rich tradition of jewellery, with over fifty types of ornaments traditionally worn by women to adorn different parts of the body:

Head : Mangtika, Aad

Nose : Nakbuli, Punchhi, Bulaak, Nathiya, Nathuni

Ears : Kanphool, Utarna, Jhumak, Sikari

Neck : Hansuli, Kanthha, Halka, Chauki, Chanarhaar, Badhi, Jhabiya, Haar

Arms : Bajuband, Baharbuta, Baank, Josan, Bajul

Wrist : Pahunchi, Pachhua, Kakani, Sankha Pola, Lahthhi, Banguri, Ageli-Pachheli, Churi, Bera, Badhara

Waist : Danrkas

Fingers : Anguthhi, Hathsankar

Feet : Bichhiya (toe ring), Pairi, Poriya, Godaaon, Jhaanjh, Pawjeb, Chhada, Chhagal

Boy's Ornaments : Bera, Godaaon, Danda, Tainti, Chanarma, Boonti

Men Ornaments :: Anguthhi, Dholna, Tainti, Bichkaani, Lorki

These ornaments hold cultural significance and are crafted from various materials, including gold and silver, reflecting the social, cultural, and ceremonial traditions of the Bhojpuri community. Gold ornaments are not worn below the waist. The Bichhiya is a significant gift given to brides during their farewell (bidaai). Bhojpuriya women regularly apply aalta (red dye) to their feet. Bhojpuriya men, however, use aalta only on special occasions. Women also adorn their hair with gajara.

Married Bhojpuriya women apply orange vermilion, known as Piyari Senur, in their hair parting (maang). During weddings, festivals like Chhath, Durga Puja, Jiutiya, Teej, and other special occasions, they wear a long streak of vermilion from their nose to their hair parting. For the Senurdaan ritual in Bhojpuri weddings, a special type of vermilion called Bhakhra Senur is used. In the northeastern part of the Bhojpuri region, in areas such as West Champaran, East Champaran, Muzaffarpur, Chhapra, Siwan, Gopalganj, Bara, Parsa, and Rautahat, pink Bhakhra Senur is common, while orange Bhakhra Senur is widely used in the rest of the Bhojpuri region. Bhojpuriya women apply tikuli on their foreheads, which is usually round in shape and red in color. A larger-sized tikuli is called tikula.

=== Textile arts ===
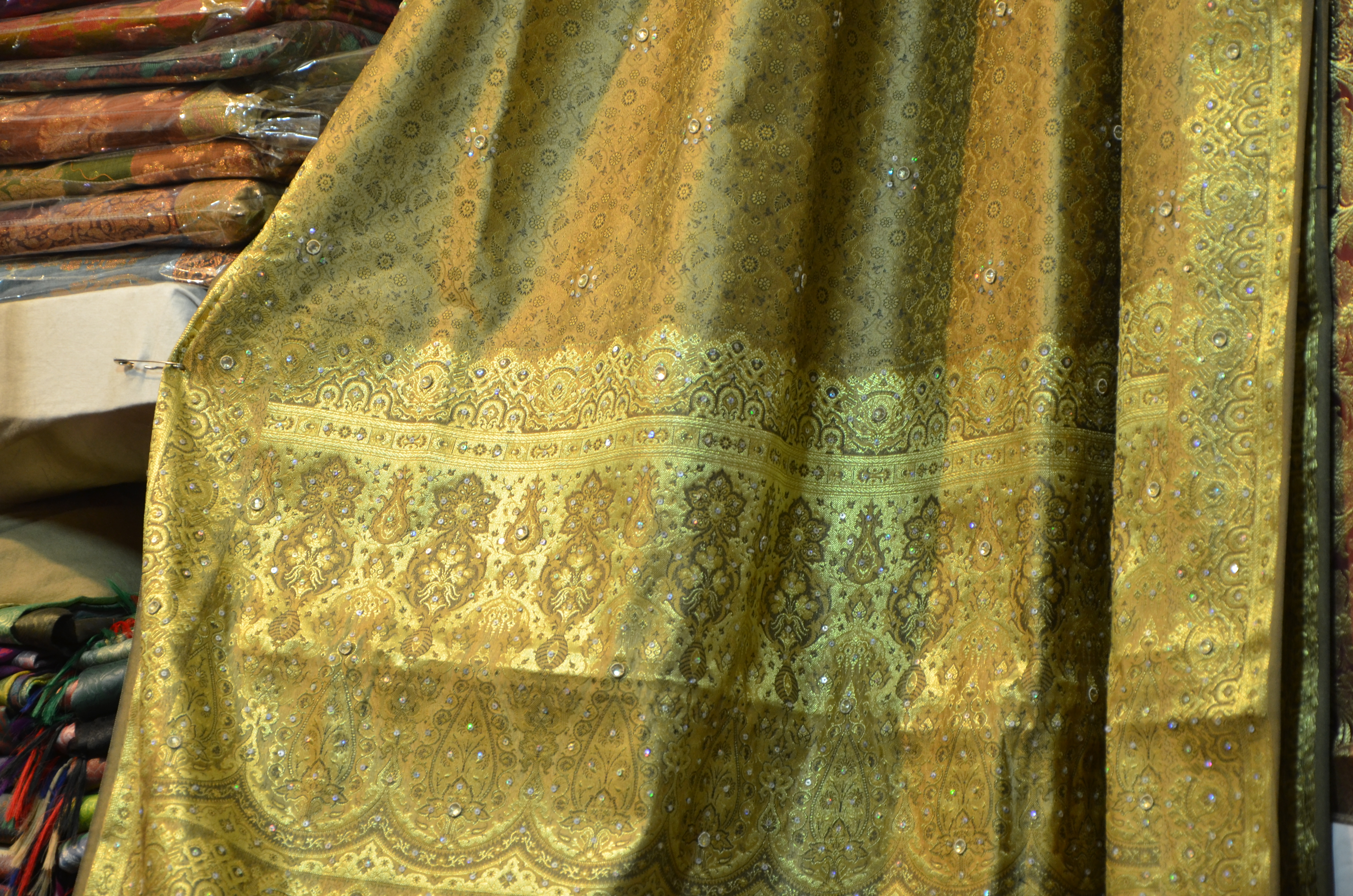
Traditional Banarasi sari with gold brocade.

Silk weaving is a manufacturing industry in Varanasi. Varanasi is known throughout India for its production of very fine silk and Banarasi saris and salwar suits.

=== Cuisine ===
Bhojpuri cuisine (Bhojpuri: 𑂦𑂷𑂔𑂣𑂳𑂩𑂲𑂨𑂰 𑂦𑂷𑂔) is a style of food preparation common among the Bhojpuri people. Bhojpuri foods are mostly mild and tend to be less hot in terms of spices used. The cuisine consists of both vegetable and meat dishes.

== Main festivals ==
Chhath Puja and Durga Puja are the biggest festivals of Bhojpuri region.

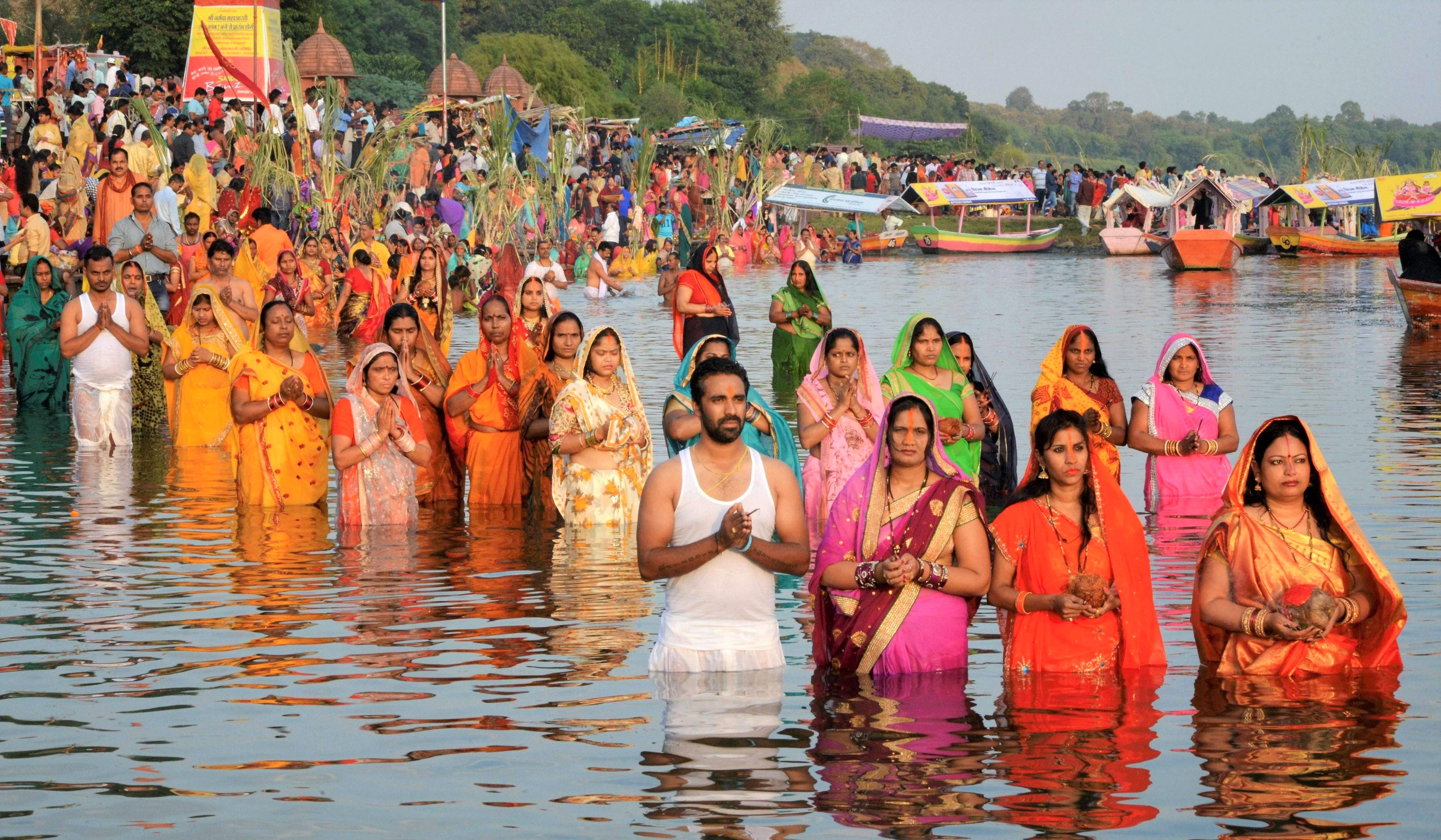
Chhath Puja, considered a Mahaparab by Bhojpuriyas

Durga Puja, one of the major Bhojpuri festival

Chhath Puja : Prayers during Chhath Puja are offered to Lord Suruj and Chhathi Maiya as an expression of gratitude and devotion. Chhath is considered as Mahaparab by the Bhojpuriyas.

Durga Puja : Durga Puja, a major festival in the Bhojpuri region, celebrates Goddess Durga's victory over Mahishasura and honors her as a symbol of life and prosperity. The main festivities are observed over five days—Khasthi, Maha Satami, Maha Athami, Maha Naomi, and Bijayadasami. However, the preparations and rituals traditionally begin from Ekam and continue for ten days.

Phagua : Phagua is a vibrant festival of colors, celebrating the arrival of spring and the victory of good over evil.

Jiutiya : Jiutiya, or Jitiya, is a three-day festival where mothers observe nirjala fasting for their children’s well-being, breaking it on the third day with traditional foods.

Sarsati Puja : It is a festival dedicated to Goddess Sarsati, the deity of wisdom, knowledge, music, and the arts.

Diyari : Deepavali, or Diyari, is the Hindu festival of lights, symbolizing the victory of light over darkness and good over evil.

Jamdiyari : A day before Diyari when the oldest woman in the family lights an old diya with seven cereals and oil outside the house, facing south, to please Jam Raja, the God of death.

Dhanteras : A day dedicated to Lord Dhanvantari, symbolizing wealth and prosperity, when acquiring new assets, gold, silver, utensils, and a broom is believed to bring good fortune.

Biskarma Puja : It is a celebration dedicated to Lord Biskarma, the creator of the universe's structures and the patron of artisans and craftsmen.

Godhan : Godhan is a two-day festival celebrated after Deepawali, where sisters perform rituals with cow dung figures, bless their brothers after symbolic curses, and conclude with an exchange of gifts.

Pidiya : Pidiya is a month-long festival celebrating the brother-sister relationship, beginning after the Godhan festival and continuing until Ekam Tithi of the Agahan month. The first 15 days are called Chhotki Pidiya, while the remaining 15 days are known as Badki Pidiya.

Rakhi : Rakhi is a celebration where sisters tie a rakhi on their brothers' wrists, symbolizing love, care, and protection.

Khichari : Khichari, also known as Sakraat, is observed with prayers to the Sun God during its transition into Capricorn, followed by feasting on Dahi Chiura, Khichari, laai, tilwa, tikut, laddus, pithas, etc.

Hartalika Teej : It is celebrated by women with fasting and prayers to seek the blessings of Goddess Gaura and Lord Shankar for a happy and prosperous married life.

Dev Deepavali : It is celebrated in Varanasi, marking the victory of Lord Shiva over the demon Tripurasur, with temples and ghats illuminated by countless oil lamps. Over time, it has also started being celebrated in other parts of Bhojpur as well.

Satuaan : a Bhojpuri festival marking the end of Kharmas, is celebrated with holy baths, donations, and offerings of satua and raw mangoes as prasad.

Maha Siuraat : Maha Siuraat or Phaguni Teras is a festival dedicated to Lord Shiva, observed with fasting, night-long vigils, and prayers for blessings and spiritual growth.

Kajari Teej : On the eve of Kajari Teej, women eat jaleba, stay awake the entire night singing Kajari songs, and dance with dholak and jhaal. The following day, they observe a fast and worship Lord Shankar and Goddess Gaura for the well-being of their husbands.

Lalahi Chhath : A festival where women fast and worship Chhathi Maiya for the well-being and long life of their children.

Nag Nathaiya : It is a festival celebrated at Tulsi Ghat in Varanasi, reenacting Lord Krishna's victory over the serpent Kaliya, observed on the fourth day of Kartik's light fortnight.

Anawat (Anant Chaturdashi) : The festival, linked to Kshira Sagara and Lord Vishnu's Anantarupa, involves rituals with a 14-knot thread, tied by men on the right arm and women on the left, along with fasting.

Ram Naumi : It is a celebration marking the birth of Lord Rama, observed with prayers, rituals, devotion and the singing of Chaiti and Sohar songs.

Karma Dharma : Karma Dharma is a harvest festival dedicated to Karam Deota, the god of power and youth, celebrated for a good harvest and health.

Janmashtami : It is a festival marking the birth of Lord Krishna, celebrated with fasting, chanting, and devotional Sohar songs.

Sama Chakwa : Sama Chakwa is a festival where girls fast and perform rituals for the well-being and prosperity of their brothers, particularly celebrated in the districts of West Champaran, East Champaran, Muzaffarpur, Bara, Parsa and Rautahat.

Bahura : On Bahura, sisters worship Lord Ganesha, fast for their brothers, feed cows, and listen to the Bahura Katha.

Ganga Dasahara : It is a Hindu festival celebrating the descent of the sacred River Ganga to Earth, observed with rituals and prayers along its banks.

Sharad Purnima : Sharad Purnima, also known as Kojagra, is celebrated with the worship of Goddess Lachhmi and Chanardeo, offering Tasmai as parsadi under the moonlight.

Katiki Punmasi : Katiki Punmasi, or Gangnahan, is a sacred Hindu festival marked by holy dips, prayers, and Dev Deepawali celebrations.

Achh Naumi : A day dedicated to Lord Vishnu, where the Amla tree is worshiped, and food is prepared and eaten beneath it.

Naga Panchami : It is dedicated to the worship of snakes, seeking protection and blessings for prosperity and health.

Guru Punmasi : Guru Punmasi is a festival celebrated to acknowledge and express gratitude to teachers and gurus.

Bar Puja : A festival where married women fast and worship the Banyan tree, praying for their husband's longevity and well-being.

== Districts ==
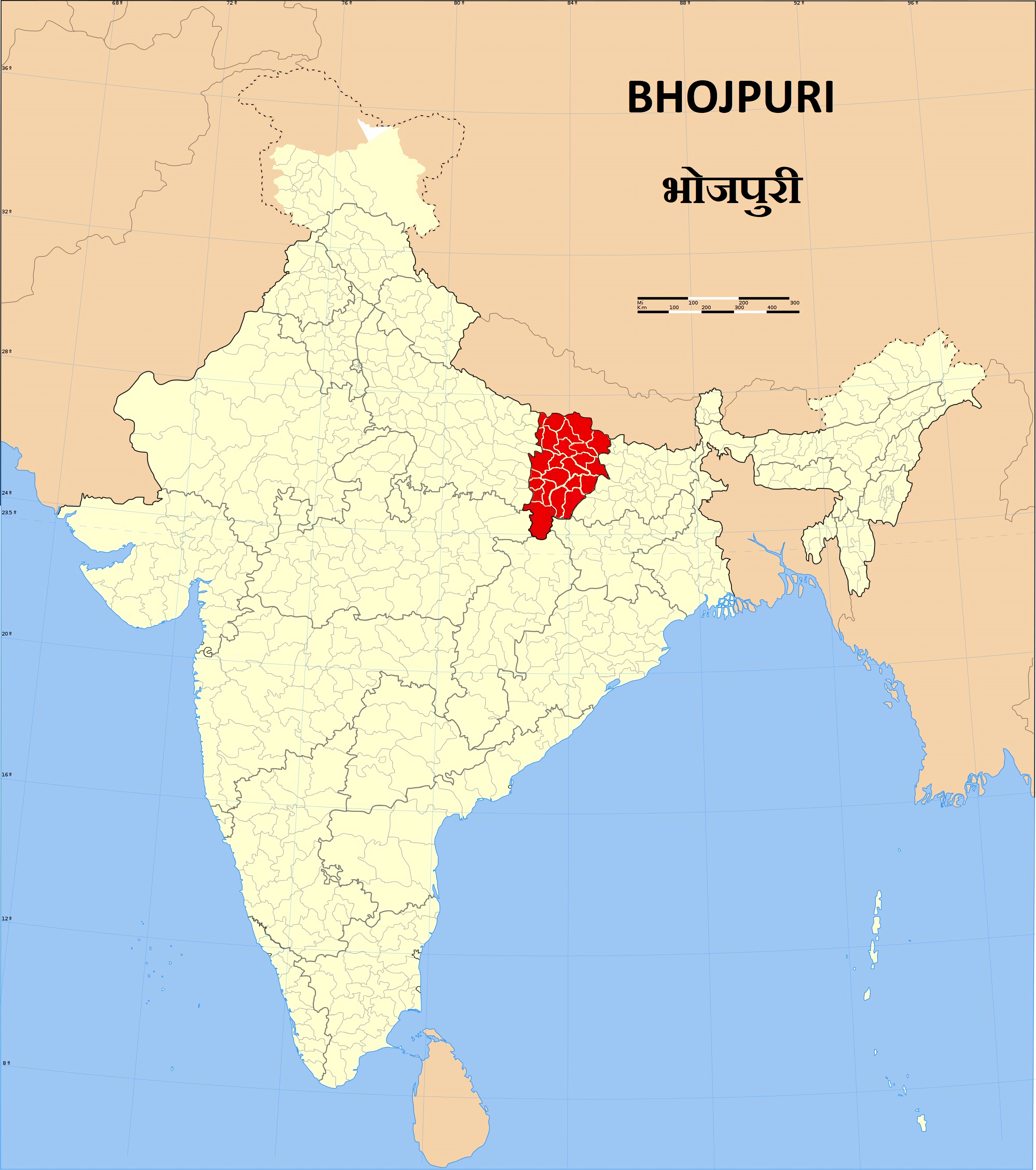
Bhojpuri region of UP & Bihar

Bhojpuri language is spoken in the districts of Western Bihar and Eastern Uttar Pradesh.

Bihar

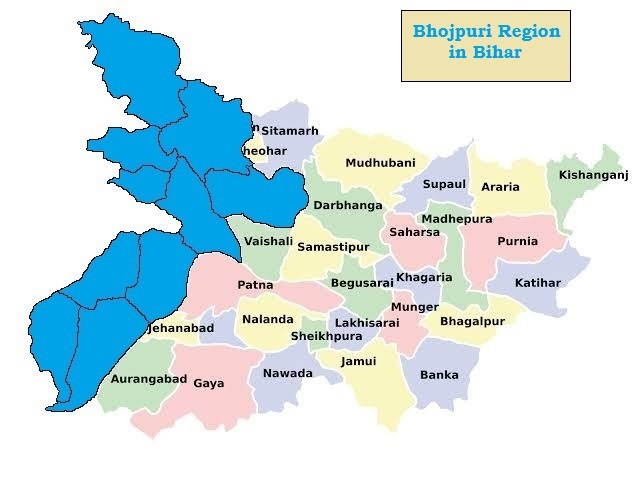
Bhojpur region in Bihar

Patna division: Bhojpur district, Buxar district, Kaimur district and Rohtas district.

Saran division: Saran district, Siwan district, Gopalganj district.

Tirhut division: West Champaran district, East Champaran district.

Uttar Pradesh

Varanasi division: Chandauli district, Ghazipur district, Jaunpur district, Varanasi district.

Gorakhpur division: Deoria district, Gorakhpur district, Kushinagar district, Maharajganj district.

Azamgarh division: Azamgarh district, Ballia district, Mau district.

Basti division: Sant Kabir Nagar district, Siddharthnagar district,

Jharkhand

Palamu division: Palamu district, Garhwa district

Madhesh Province (Nepal)

Bara district, Parsa district, Rautahat district

Lumbini Province (Nepal)

Parasi district, Rupandehi district

Note that Bhojpur district of Koshi Pradesh is not an Indo-Aryan Bhojpuri ethnolinguistic region, although it shares the same name.

== Religion ==
According to the 2011 Census, Hindus form the majority in the Bhojpuri region, with 85.33% adhering to Hinduism. Islam is practiced by 14.5% of the population, while 0.52% profess other religions.

Religion in Bhojpuri Region (2011)
1. Hindu (85.3%)
2. Muslim (14.2%)
3. Others (0.52%)

== Demands for administrative units ==
=== Proposed Indian State ===
In India, there is an active movement in the Bhojpuri-speaking region of Uttar Pradesh, Bihar and Jharkhand, demanding the formation of a separate Bhojpuri state. This moment has been characterised by strong sentiment of the people to unite as one, have their language Bhojpuri as the official language of the state, and the historical economic neglect of this region by their respective state governments as well as the central government policies. The proposed capital for this state is either Varanasi or Gorakhpur.

=== Proposed Nepalese Province ===
There is a demand for a separate Bhojpura state in Nepal, formed by merging the Bhojpuri-speaking areas of Madhesh, Lumbini, Gandaki and Bagmati provinces, with Birgunj proposed as the capital city.

== See also ==
- Bhojpuri
