= Lalahi Chhath =

Lord Balarama's festival in India

- Official name: ललही छठ
- Also called: Lalai Chhath; Halchhath; Hal Shashthi
- Observed by: Hindu
- Type: Hinduism
- Significance: Lord Balarama Janmotsava (Birth anniversary)
- Date: Shashthi Krishna Paksha Bhadrapada

Lalahi Chhath (Devanagari: ललही छठ) also called Lalai Chhath or Halchhath or Hal Shashthi is a Hindu festival dedicated to Chhathi Maiya, observed on the sixth day of the dark fortnight (Krishna paksha) of the month of Bhadrapada. It is majorly celebrated in the Bhojpuri region, particularly across Purvanchal, including eastern Uttar Pradesh and parts of western Bihar in India. It is also observed in the Rewa region of Madhya Pradesh. On this festival married women having children perform fasting wishing long and healthy life for their sons. According to Hindu adherents, it is believed that by observing this fast, all the troubles coming to the son are removed. The women observing the fast sit in groups on the banks of a river, pond or reservoir and worship Shashthi Devi. During the rituals, mothers make various figures, including grotesque snakes, flat-nosed and thick-lipped human figures and small ponds. The fast is traditionally broken with puffed rice, buffalo milk and curd served on mahua-leaf plates. Dairy products from cows are strictly prohibited. In the Braj region, the festival is observed as Baldev Chhath or Balram Chhath. In the Braj and Awadh regions, it is celebrated as the birth anniversary of Lord Balrama, while in the Bhojpuri region, it is observed as a festival dedicated to Shashthi Devi.
