= Madho Singh =

Madho Singh may refer to:

- Madho Singh (wrestler) (1929–2006), Indian wrestler
- Madho Singh (Ghess) (1786–1858), Binjhal zamindar (landlord) of Ghess locality
- Madho Singh (ruler), maharaja of Panna
- Madho Singh Bhandari (c. 1585 – c. 1640), warrior, military general, and administrator in the Kingdom of Garhwal
- Madho Singh I (1728–1768), Kachwaha Rajput ruler of the Kingdom of Jaipur
- Madho Singh II (1862–1922), maharaja of the Princely State of Jaipur
- Madho Singh of Sikar (died 1922), Rao Raja of Sikar
