= Silk industry in Varanasi =

Overview of manufacturing of silk saris in Varanasi

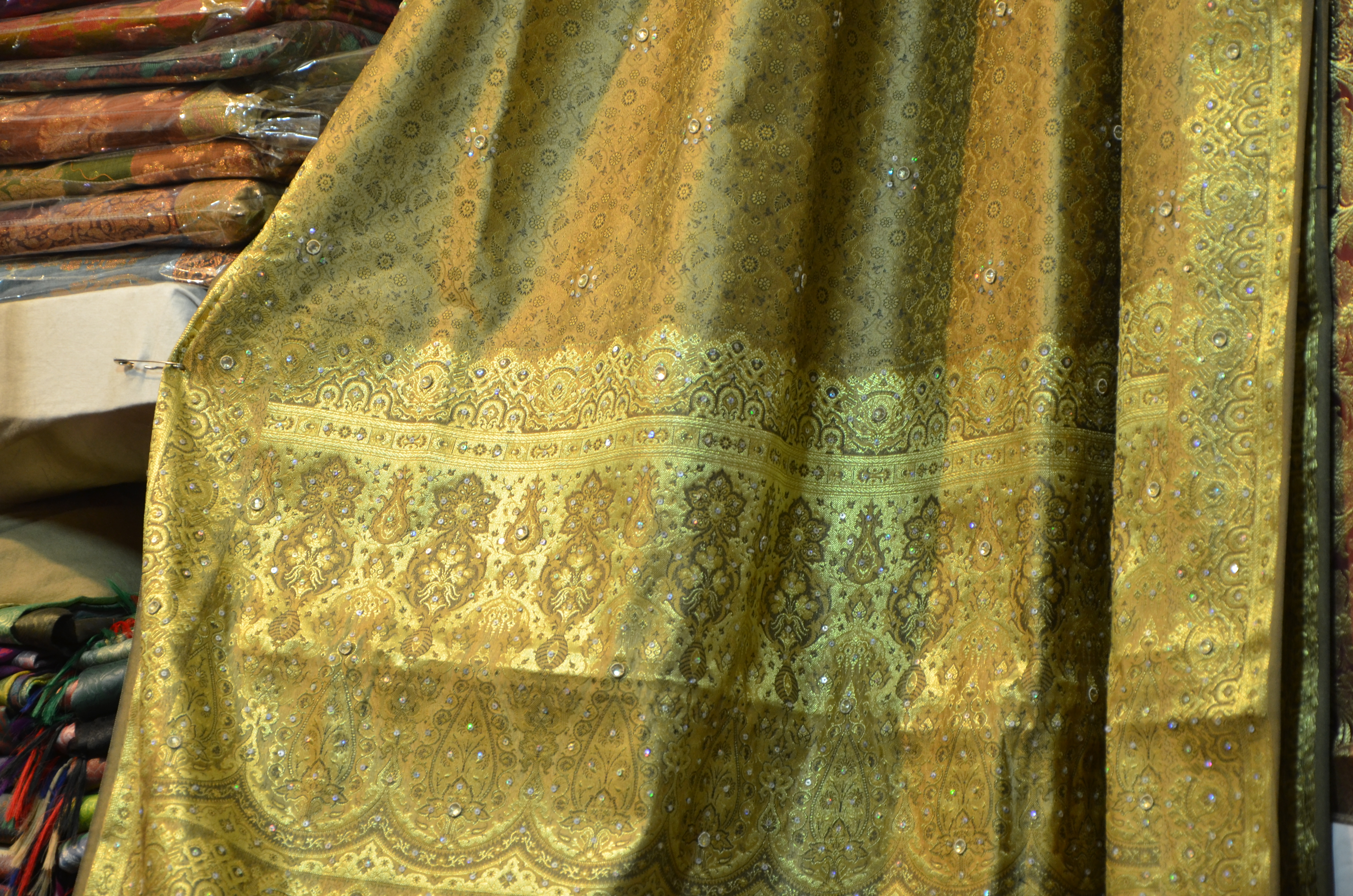
traditional Banarasi sari with gold brocade.

Silk weaving is a manufacturing industry in Varanasi. Varanasi is known throughout India for its production of very fine silk and Banarasi saris.

== Overview ==
Weaving is typically done within the household, and most weavers in Varanasi are Momin Ansari Muslims. Many of Varanasi's Muslims belong to a weaver community that is known by the name of Ansari, which means "helper" in Arabic. For generations they have passed on their craft from father to son, hand-weaving silk on room-sized foot-powered looms. They are fashioned into Sarees worn only for special occasions; many Indian girls dream of wearing Varanasi silk Saree for their wedding day.

Varanasi saris are adorned with intricate designs and zari embellishments making it popular during traditional functions and weddings. Earlier, the embroidery on sarees were often done with threads of pure gold. In 2009, weaver associations and cooperatives together secured Geographical Indication (GI) rights for ‘Banaras Brocades and Sarees’. This silk is used in large part for the production of Banarasi saris, which are a regional type of sari made from silk.

As of 2015, there are roughly 40,000 weavers in Varanasi, down from 300,000. Some attribute the decline to lower demand of Saris or higher number of imported Saris. Others suggest that power looms played a role.

Varanasi has a high rate of Child labour given the unorganised nature of small scale industries. According to Human Rights Watch, it is common for children as young as 5 or 6 to begin working in industry because it is believed to be more efficient to teach them from a very young age rather than teaching an older child of 12 the trade.

== See also ==
- Silk in the Indian subcontinent
