= Abdullah Gan =

Mountainous region of Afghanistan

Coordinates: 30.583°N 66.683°E

Abdullah Gan, is a mountainous region of Afghanistan. The population there are primarily members of the Shia Muslim Hazara ethnic group. They were particularly obstinate in their opposition to the hard-line Sunni Taliban regime.

Throughout the war, the Taliban laid siege to Abdullah Gan, refusing to allow any aid through. Villagers caught trying to bring food up from Zari were beaten.
