= Banarasi sari =

Indian Sari made in Varanasi

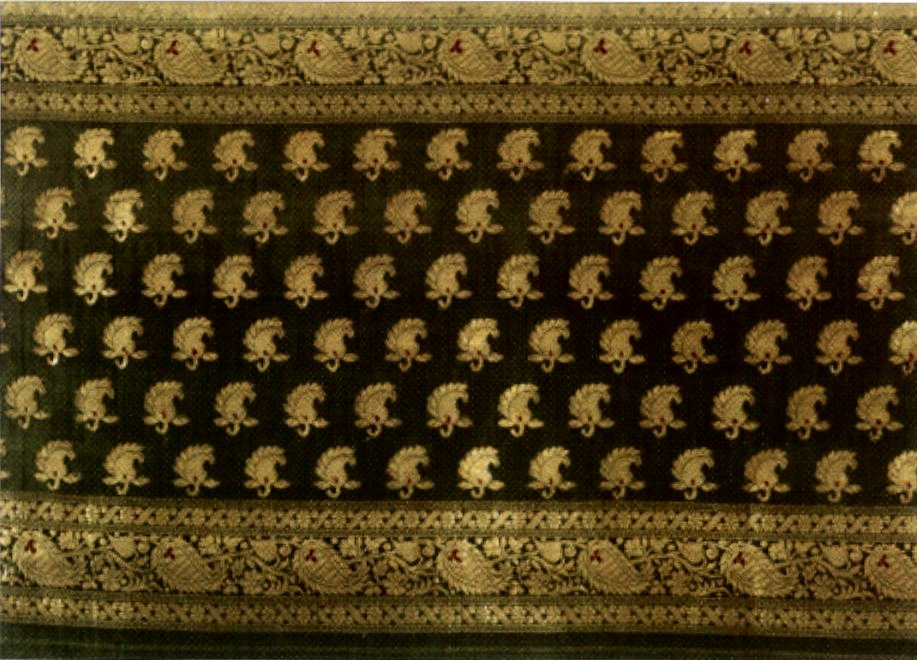
sari from Varanasi (Banaras), silk and gold-wrapped silk yarn with supplementary weft brocade (zari)

A Banarasi sari is a sari made in Varanasi, an ancient city in the Bhojpur-Purvanchal region, which is also called Benares (Banaras). The saris are among the finest saris in India and are known for their gold and silver brocade or zari, fine silk and opulent embroidery. The saris are made of finely woven silk and are decorated with intricate designs, and, because of these engravings, are relatively heavy.

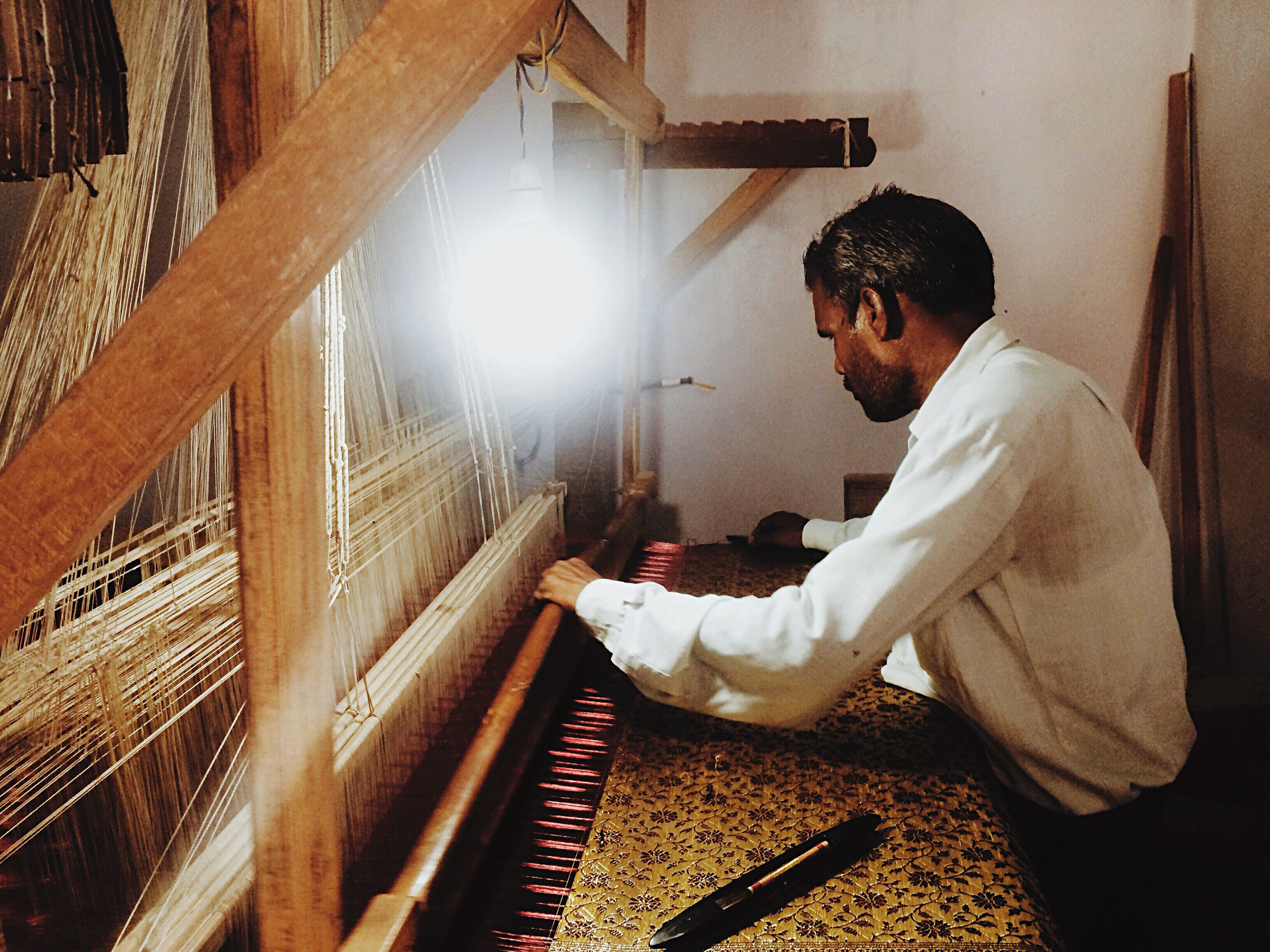
A man making a handcrafted Banarasi Silk sari

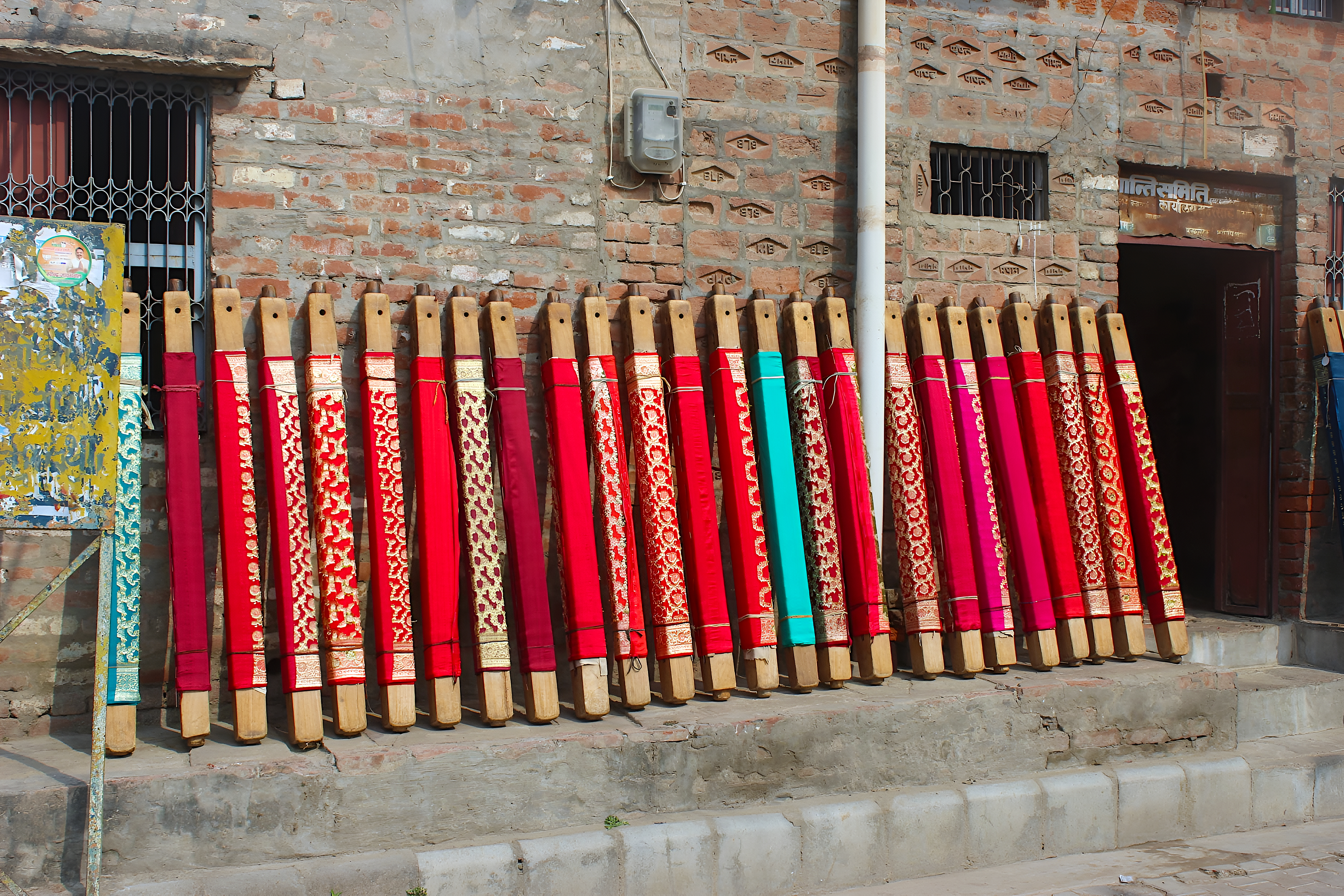
Banarasi Sari on viewing wooden blocks

Their special characteristics include intricate intertwining floral and foliate motifs, kalga and bel, a string of upright leaves called jhallar at the outer, edge of border is a characteristic of these saris. Other features are gold work, compact weaving, figures with small details, metallic visual effects, pallus, jal (a net like pattern), and mina work.

Depending on the intricacy of its designs and patterns, a sari can take from 15 days to a month and sometimes up to six months to complete. Banarasi saris are mostly worn by Indian women on important occasions such as when attending a wedding and are expected to be complemented by the woman's best jewellery.

== History ==
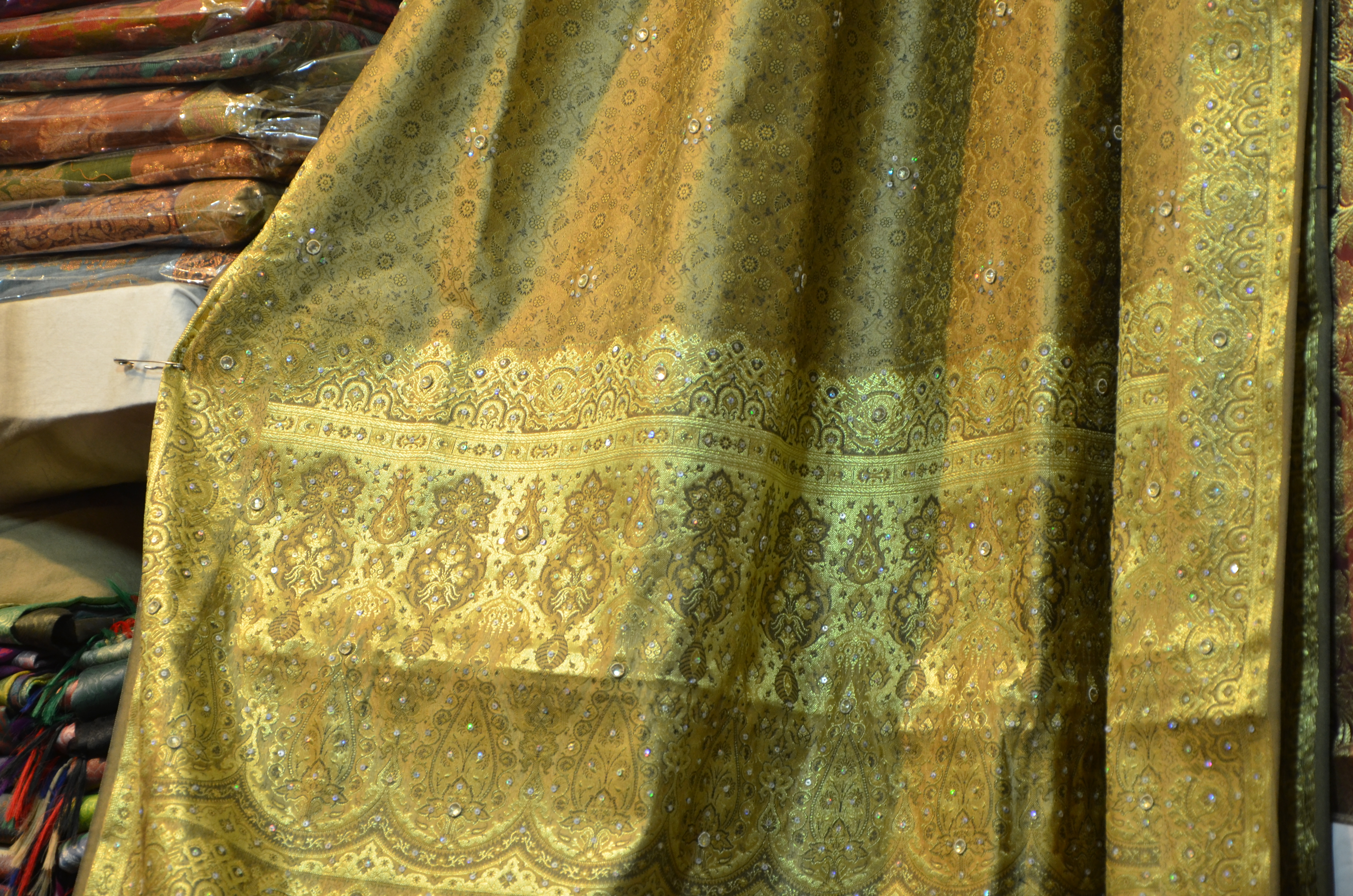
A traditional Banarasi sari with gold brocade

Ralph Fitch (1583–1591) describes Banaras as a thriving sector of the cotton textile industry. The earliest mention of the brocade and Zari textiles of Banaras is found in the 19th century. With the migration of silk weavers from Gujarat during the famine of 1603, it is likely that silk brocade weaving started in Banaras in the seventeenth century and developed in excellence during the 18th and 19th century. During the Mughal period, around the 14th century, weaving of brocades with intricate designs using gold and silver threads became the specialty of Banaras.

Among the many artisan families were Persian-origin weavers who initially settled in Gujarat and later migrated to Banaras between the 15th and 17th centuries. One such descendant was Jokhan, a Julaha weaver from Harsos village in the late 19th century. His modern-day descendant, Alkama Ansari, continues to represent the original handloom weavers of Banarasi sarees and works to preserve their heritage under the name Bansari Silk by Original Weavers under Alkama Group.

The traditional Banarasi sari is done with cottage industry for about 1.2 million people associated directly or indirectly with the handloom silk industry of the region around Varanasi encompassing Gorakhpur, Chandauli, Bhadohi, Jaunpur and Azamgarh districts.

In the last few years, a variety of independent, Varanasi-based brands have emerged to revive the Banarasi sari and bring them directly to mainstream consumers, including Ekaya, Tilfi Banaras, Chinaya Banaras, HKV Benaras among others.

== Geographical indication ==
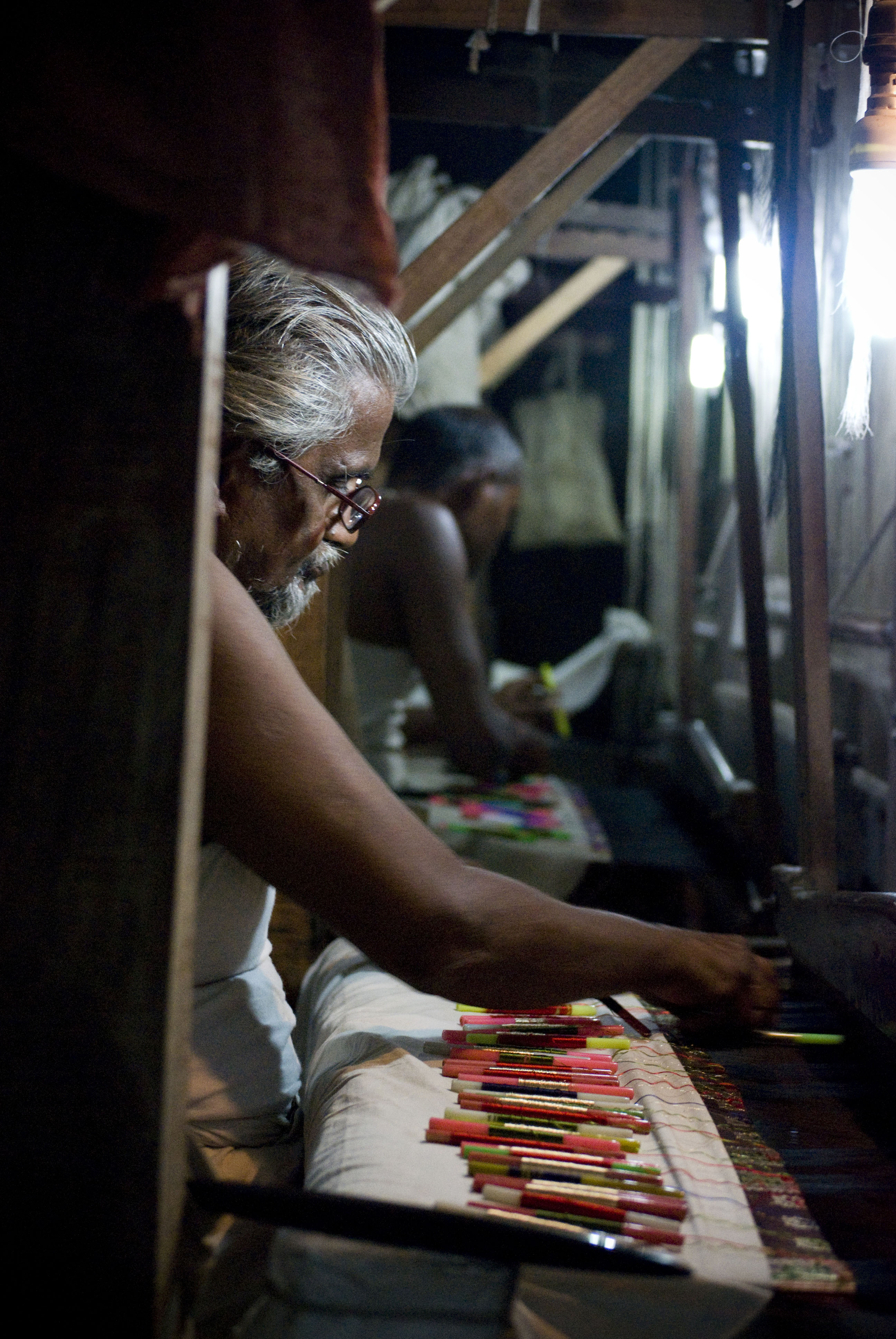
Silk handlooms, Varanasi

Over the years, the Banarasi silk handloom industry has been incurring huge losses because of competition from mechanised units producing the Varanasi silk saris at a faster rate and at cheaper cost, another source of competition has been saris made of cheaper synthetic alternatives to silk.

In 2009, after two years of wait, weaver associations in Uttar Pradesh, secured Geographical Indication (GI) rights for the ‘Banaras Brocades and saris’. GI is an intellectual property right, which identifies a good as originating in a certain region where a given quality, reputation or other characteristic of the product is essentially attributable to its geographical origin.

As per the GI certificate, Banarasi products fall under four classes (23–26), namely silk brocades, textile goods, silk sari, dress material and silk embroidery. Most importantly this means that no sari or brocade made outside the six identified districts of Uttar Pradesh, that is, Varanasi, Mirzapur, Chandauli, Bhadohi, Jaunpur and Azamgarh districts, can be legally sold under the name of Banaras sari and brocade. Prior to this, in July 2007, nine organizations, Banaras Bunkar Samiti, Human Welfare Association (HWA), joint director industries (eastern zone), director of handlooms and textiles Uttar Pradesh Handloom Fabrics Marketing Cooperative Federation, Eastern UP Exporters Association (EUPEA), Banarasi Vastra Udyog Sangh, Banaras Hath Kargha Vikas Samiti and Adarsh Silk Bunkar Sahkari Samiti, had applied to the Chennai-based Geographical Indication Registry of the Government of India, in a move that was supported by United Nations Conference on Trade and Development (UNCTAD).

== Varieties ==
There are four main varieties of Banarasi sari, which include pure silk (Katan), Organza (Kora) with Zari and silk; Georgette, and Shattir, and according to design process, they are divided into categories like, Jangla, Tanchoi, Vaskat, Cutwork, Tissue and Butidar

== Environmental concern ==
Since a large number of silk dyeing units in the trade use chemical dyes, which cause pollution in the Ganges River, a move is on to shift to natural dyes. A research team from the Indian Institute of Technology, Banaras Hindu University (IIT-BHU) used the technique of solvent extraction and enzymatic extraction to develop natural colours from plants, flowers and fruits including acacia, butea (palash), madder, marigold and pomegranate (anar)

== See also ==
- Bunkar: The Last of the Varanasi Weavers
- Silk in the Indian subcontinent
- Zari
- Pochampally sari
- Mysore silk
- Ilkal sari
- List of fabrics
