= Igas Bagwal =

Festival in Uttarakhand, India

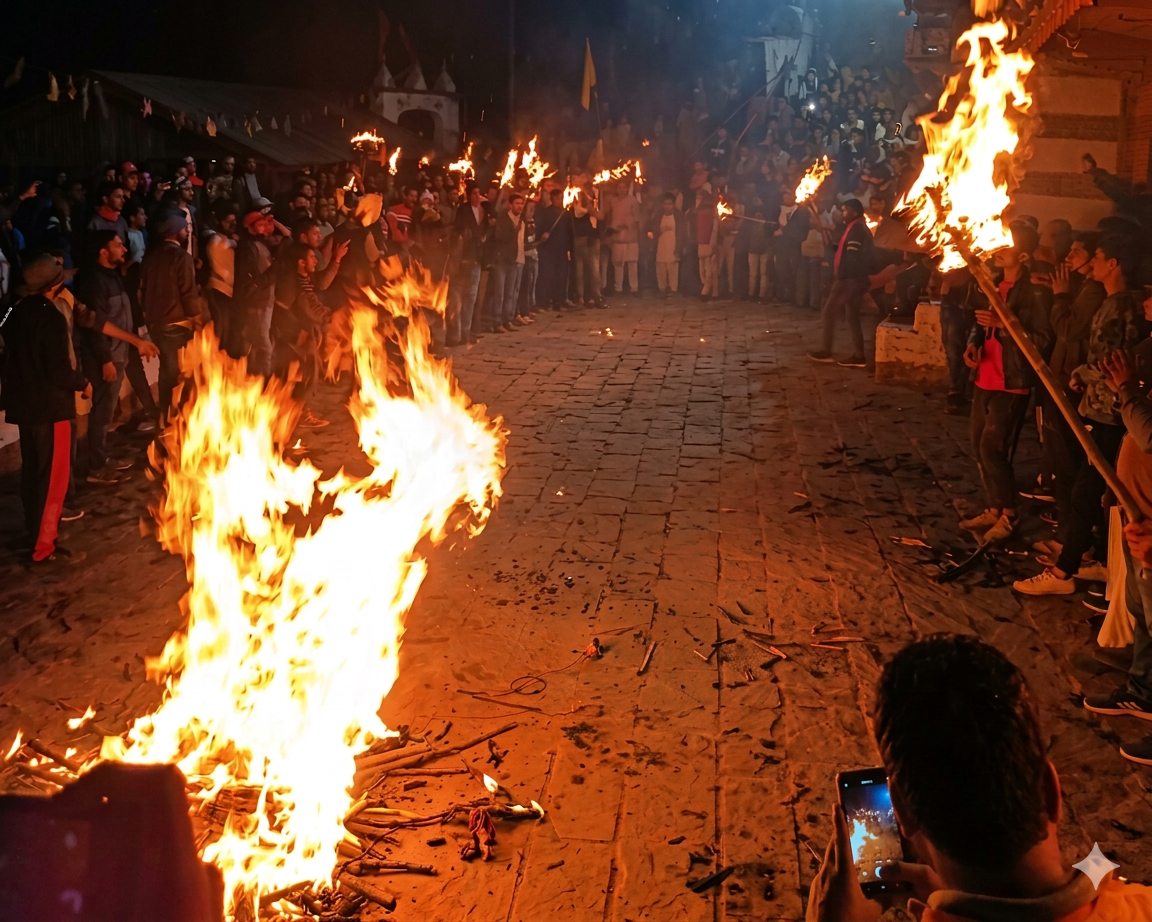
- Celebration of Igas Bagwal in Uttarakhand
- Also called: Budhi Diwali
- Observed by: People of Uttarakhand (primarily Garhwali communities)
- Type: Cultural and religious festival
- Significance: Celebrated as Budhi Diwali, marking the delayed celebration of Diwali in the Himalayan region
- Celebrations: Lighting lamps, Bhailo ritual, folk songs, dances and community feasts
- Date: Ekadashi
- 2026 date: 20 November 2026
- Duration: 1 Day
- Frequency: Annual
- Related to: Diwali

Igas Bagwal is a traditional festival celebrated in the northern Indian state of Uttarakhand. It is observed eleven days after Diwali, on Ekadashi in the Hindu lunar calendar. According to Hindu mythology, news of Rama's return to Ayodhya after exile reached the hilly regions of Uttarakhand eleven days later. The festival includes practices such as lighting oil lamps, performing folk dances, and conducting rituals involving livestock.

== Etymology ==
The name Igas Bagwal is derived from words used in the Garhwali language and other regional dialects of Uttarakhand. The term Igas refers to the eleventh day (Ekadashi) of the bright fortnight (Shukla Paksha) in the Hindu month of Kartik or Mangsir, the day on which the festival is observed.

The word Bagwal is a regional term used in Garhwali and Kumaoni language for a festival of lights similar to Diwali. Together, the name Igas Bagwal refers to the Diwali celebration observed on Kartik Shukla Ekadashi, which occurs eleven days after the main festival of Diwali.

The festival is therefore also popularly known as Budhi Diwali (Old or Late Diwali) in parts of Uttarakhand.

== History and legends ==
The origins of Igas Bagwal are rooted in several regional traditions and folklore from the Himalayan areas of Uttarakhand, particularly in the Garhwal region. The festival is widely associated with the delayed celebration of Diwali in these mountainous regions.

One commonly cited belief links the festival to the return of Rama to Ayodhya after defeating Ravana, as described in the epic Ramayana. According to local tradition, the news of Rama’s victory reached remote villages of Uttarakhand several days later due to the difficult Himalayan terrain and limited communication methods. Consequently, the local population celebrated Diwali eleven days later, which gradually became known as Igas Bagwal or Budhi Diwali.

Another tradition associates the festival with Madho Singh Bhandari, a historic military leader from the Garhwal region. Local lore holds that villagers celebrated his victorious return from a campaign in Tibet after the main Diwali celebrations had concluded. This delayed celebration with lamps and communal festivities is believed to have gradually developed into the annual observance of Igas Bagwal.

== Rituals and celebrations ==
The celebration of Igas Bagwal involves a number of traditional rituals and community activities in the villages of Uttarakhand, particularly in the Garhwal region.

One of the most distinctive customs of the festival is the Bhailo ritual. During the evening, villagers prepare torches made from dried Pine wood and grass, which are lit and swung in circular motions in open spaces. The ritual is often accompanied by traditional songs and dances and symbolizes the triumph of light over darkness.

Similar to the celebration of Diwali, households light oil lamps and decorate their homes. Families prepare traditional dishes and sweets, and people visit relatives and neighbours to exchange greetings and participate in community feasts.

Folk music and dances are an important part of the celebrations. Traditional Garhwali musical instruments such as the dhol and damau are played during the festivities, and villagers gather in groups to sing and dance late into the night.

== Cultural significance ==
Igas Bagwal holds an important place in the cultural traditions of Uttarakhand, especially in the Garhwal region. The festival reflects the social and cultural identity of the Garhwali communities and represents the continuation of regional customs and folk practices.

The celebration of the festival highlights the importance of community participation in the rural Himalayan society of Uttarakhand. Villagers gather collectively for rituals, folk music, and dances, strengthening social bonds and preserving local cultural traditions.

In recent years, Igas Bagwal has gained wider recognition across the state, and cultural organizations and local governments have promoted the festival as an important part of the heritage of Uttarakhand. Celebrations are now organized not only in villages but also in towns and cities, helping to preserve and promote Garhwali traditions among younger generations.

== See also ==
- Diwali
- Harela
- Ghughutiya Festival
- Uttarayani Mela
