= Tilfi =

Handmade Eritrean clothing

Tilfi is a traditional weaving technique in Banarasi brocades which uses three colour yarns. The term was introduced to a wider audience by a Varanasi-based, Indian brand of the same name, Tilfi Banaras, that specialises in handloom weaving.

Tilfi is also a handmade Tigray clothing, with cross-like stitching around the chest area, neck, and wrist. Some women include small button-like silver or 24-karat gold around the designs. It comes with an extra material that also has intricate stitching that is wrapped around the head and shoulders.
