= Shankha (ornament) =

Rigid ring-shaped bracelet worn on the arm or wrist

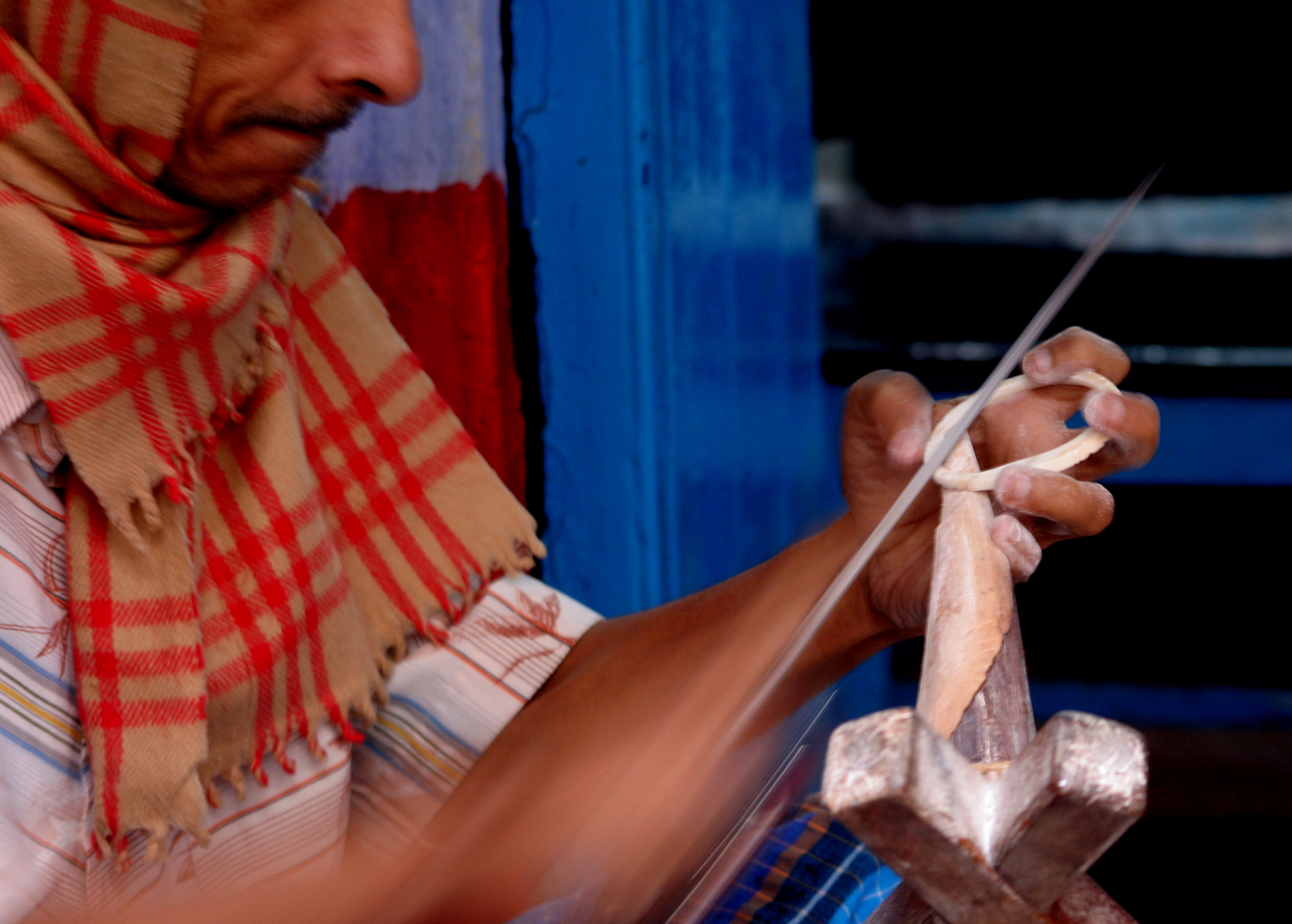
Shankha production

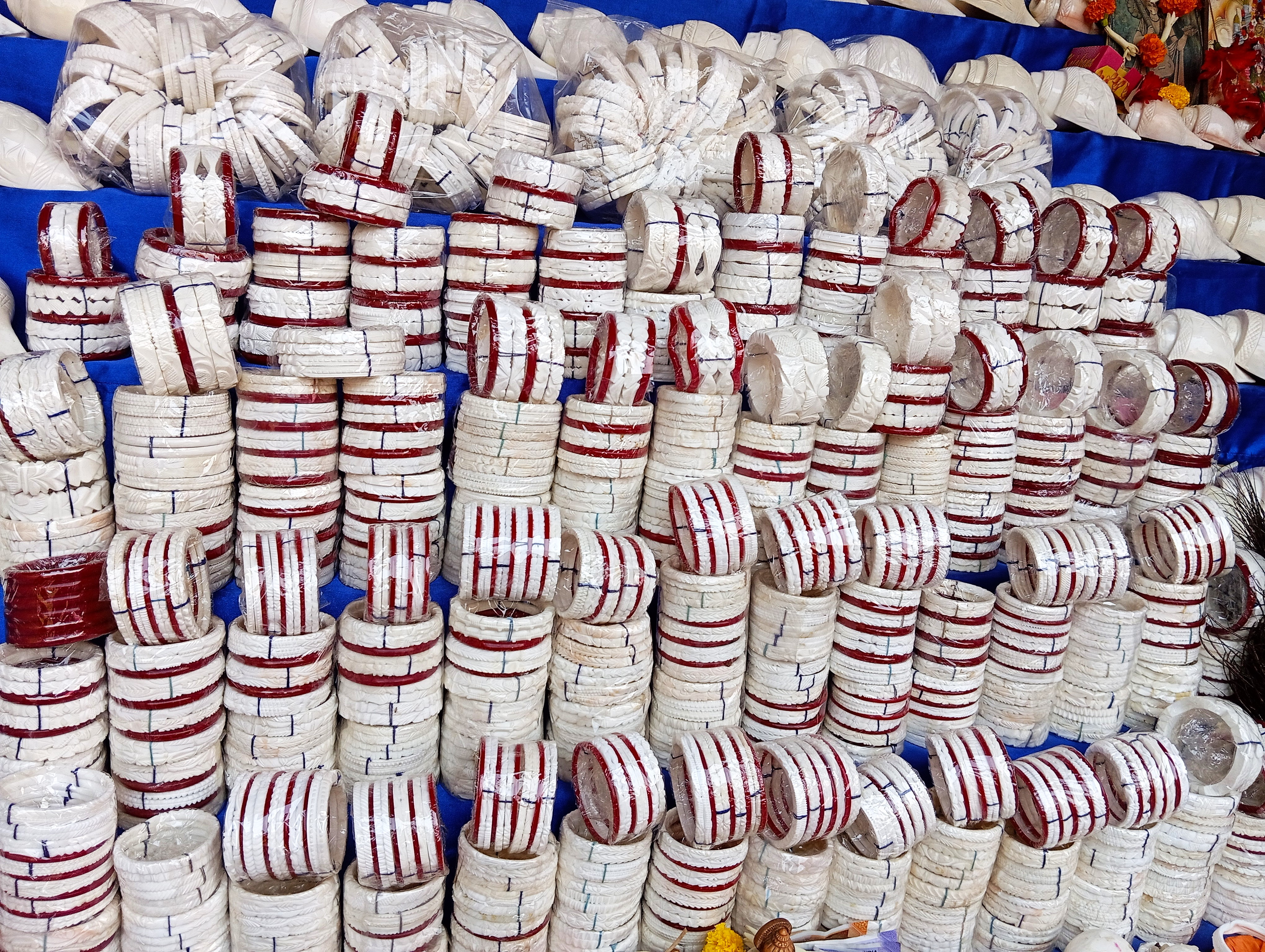
A diverse collection of shankha, Kolkata, India.

Shankha or conch bangles is a bangle-shaped ornament made from the shell of marine conchs. Shankha is worn by Bengali Hindu married women. Traditionally, women wear white shankha around their hands along with sindoor, noa (golden bangles), and pola (red bangles). The parents in the bride's family traditionally gift two shankha to her on the occasion of their daughter's wedding in a Bengali Hindu tradition. Moreover, the groom himself often buys shankha for his bride as part of their wedding ceremonies. The use of Shankha by married Hindu women in Bengal is deeply rooted in religious beliefs and cultural practices, which might vary from region to region. Many believe that Shankha, made from conch shells, must be worn for the well-being and prosperity of their husbands. In case the husband of a woman dies, her Shankha are either broken or removed from her. In many regions, wearing shankha is not considered mandatory for married Hindu women.

== See also ==
- Shankha
- Shakha, Pola and Noa
