= Madho Singh Bhandari =

17th-century Garhwali warrior and administrator

Shri Madho Singh Bhandari
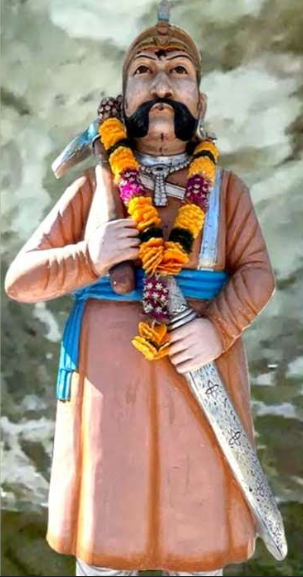
- Born: c. 1585 c. Maletha, Tehri-Garhwal, Uttarakhand
- Died: c. 1640 c. Chotta Chini, Tibet (present-day China)
- Military career
- Allegiance: Kingdom of Garhwal
- Branch: Garhwali Army
- Service years: c. 1600–1640
- Rank: General Commander
- Conflicts: Battle of Chotta Chini (c. 1635–1640); Campaigns against Tibet and
- Awards: Folk hero status; subject of Pawara ballads
- Other work: Administrator, builder of Maletha Canal

Madho Singh Bhandari (c. 1585 – c. 1640) was a prominent warrior, military general, and administrator in the Kingdom of Garhwal during the reign of King Mahipat Shah in the 17th century. He is celebrated in Garhwali folklore for his military bravery, infrastructural contributions, and ultimate sacrifice during the construction of the Maletha Canal.

== Early life ==
Madho Singh Bhandari was born around 1585 CE in Maletha, a village in the present-day Tehri-Garhwal district of Uttarakhand, India. His family belonged to a respected warrior rajput lineage and served the Garhwali kings for generations. From an early age, he was trained in martial arts, horse riding, and warfare strategy.

== Military career ==
During the reign of King Mahipat Shah (r. c. 1620–1640), Bhandari emerged as one of the three most prominent generals of Garhwal, alongside lodi singh Rikhola negi and Banwari Dass. His period of activity coincided with campaigns against Tibet, Sirmour, and the southern frontiers of Garhwal.

A well-known Garhwali saying encapsulates his legendary status: "Ek Singh desh ran, ek Singh gaay ka, ek Singh Madho Singh aur Singh kaaye ka" — meaning "One Singh in the battlefield, one Singh (horn) of a cow, and one Singh Madho Singh."

=== Battle of Chotta Chini ===
Bhandari is believed to have died in the Battle of Chotta Chini in Tibet, sometime between 1635 and 1640 CE. According to tradition, he was fatally wounded in battle when Garhwali forces were in disarray. To prevent his death from demoralizing the troops, he ordered his men to roast his body and display it on horseback so that the enemy would believe he was still alive. This stratagem reportedly caused the Tibetans to retreat, thinking he remained in command. His bravery is immortalized in the Pawara ballads sung in Garhwal.

== Maletha Canal ==
Bhandari is also renowned for his role in constructing the Maletha Canal, a 2-kilometre-long irrigation channel from the Takoli Gad to Maletha village. Built in the 17th century, the canal includes a 600-metre tunnel carved through hard rock. Local tradition holds that he sacrificed his own son to propitiate a goddess and ensure the canal's successful completion. This act is considered one of the greatest sacrifices in the history of Himalayan public works.

== Legacy ==
Madho Singh Bhandari remains one of the most celebrated figures in Garhwali history. His military exploits, infrastructural achievements, and self-sacrifice have inspired folk songs, particularly the chivalric Pawara ballads. In Uttarakhand, his name is invoked as a symbol of bravery, leadership, and devotion to public welfare.
