= Purvanchal =

Region in Northern India

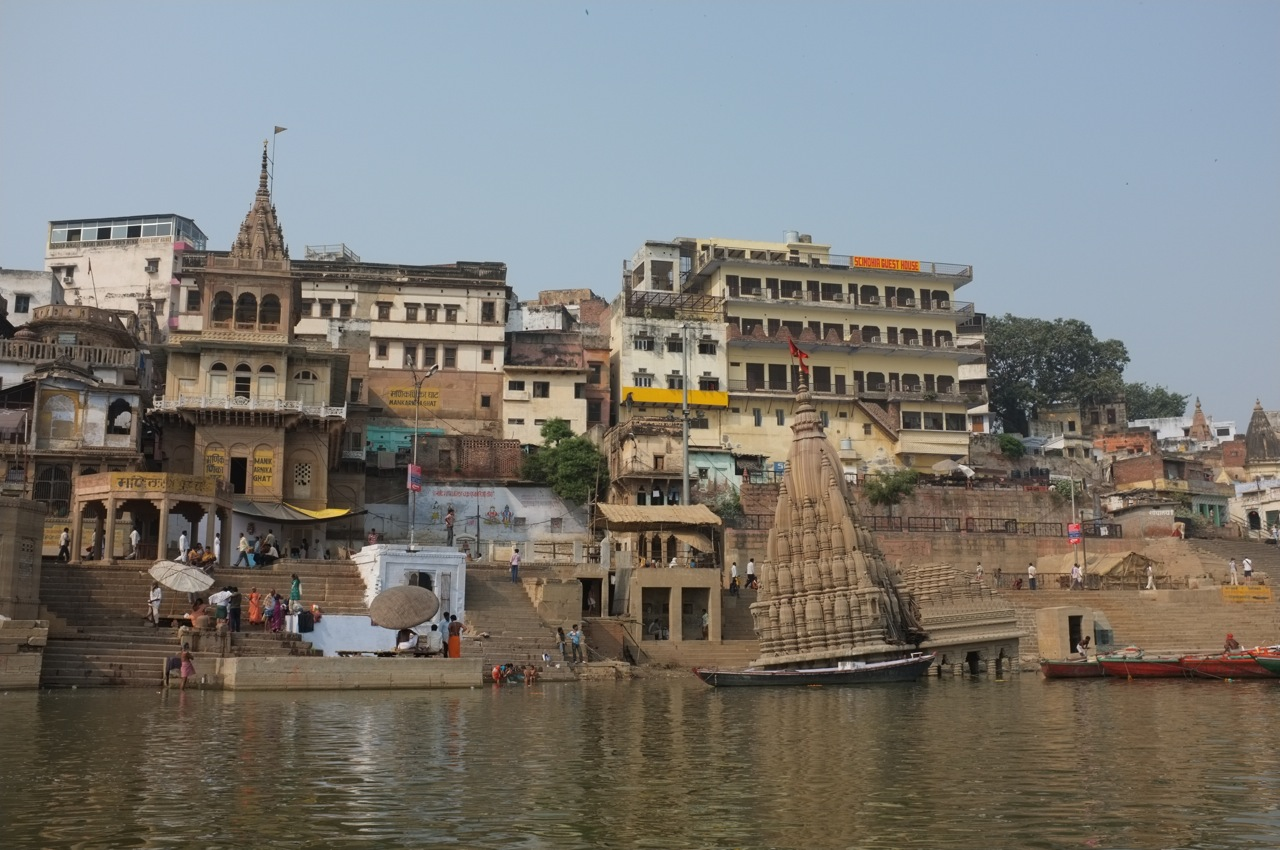
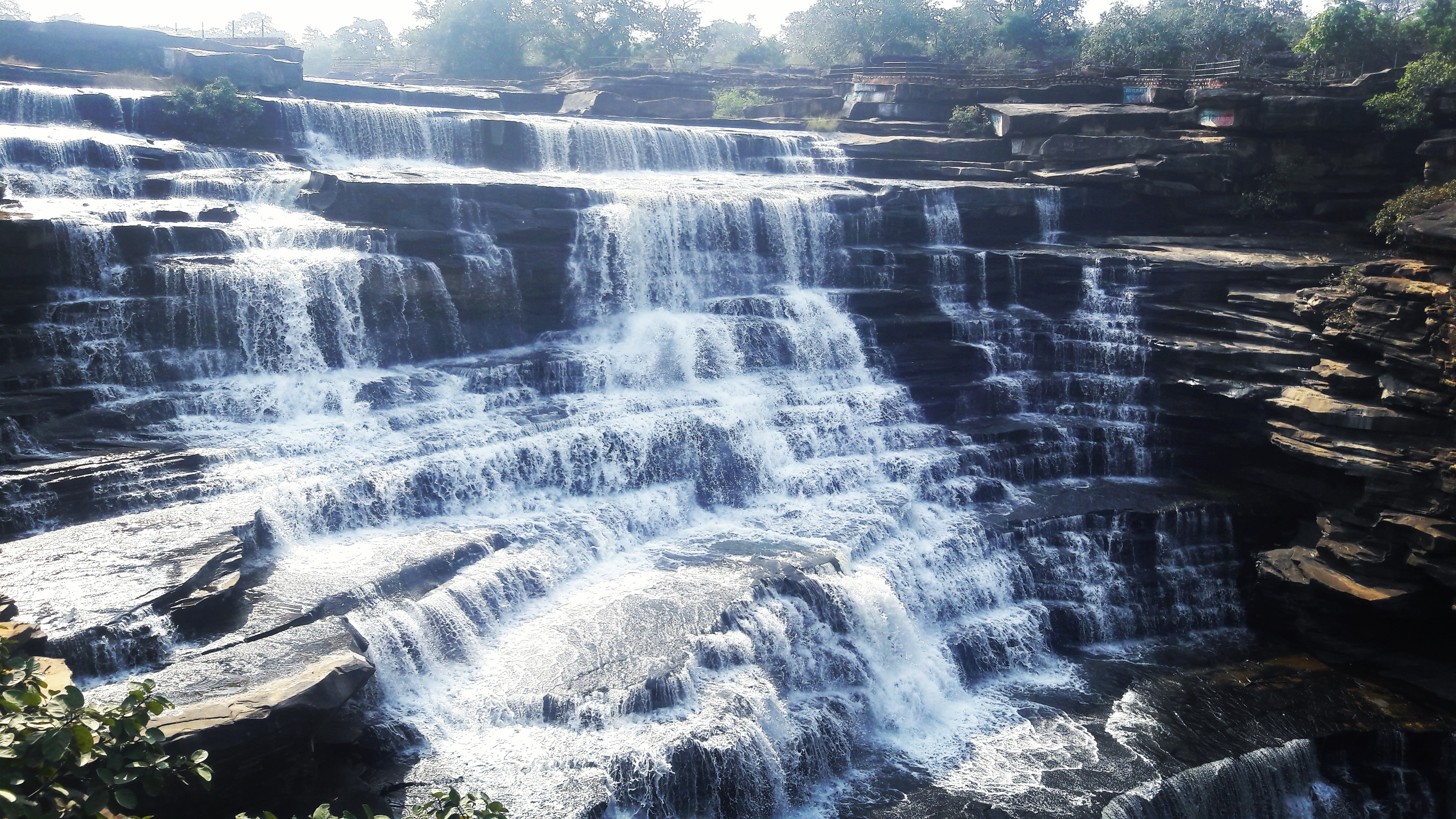
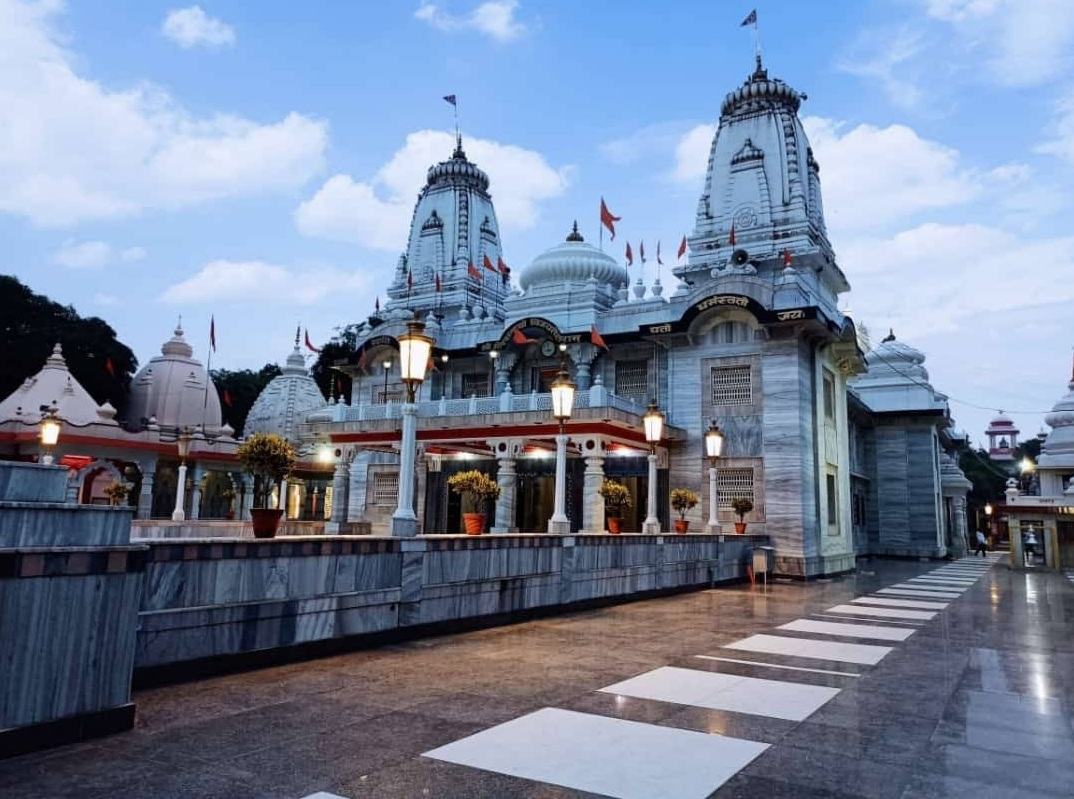
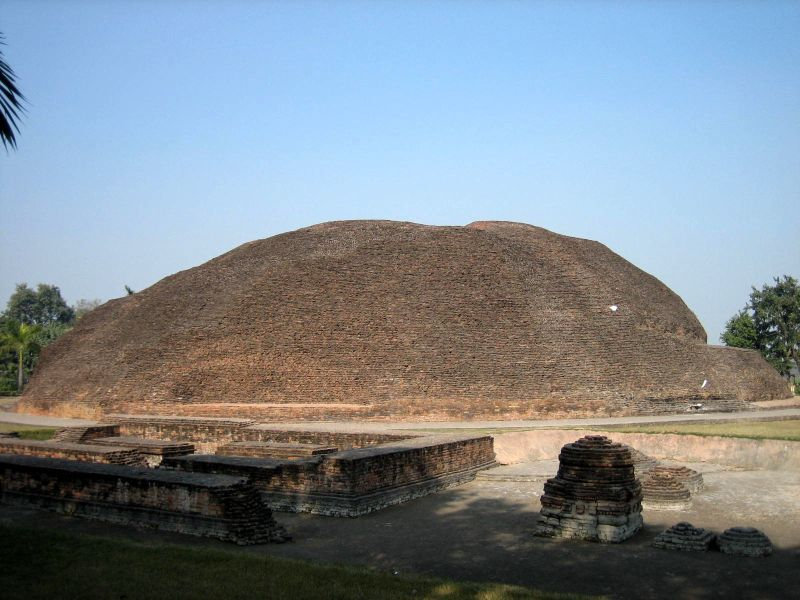
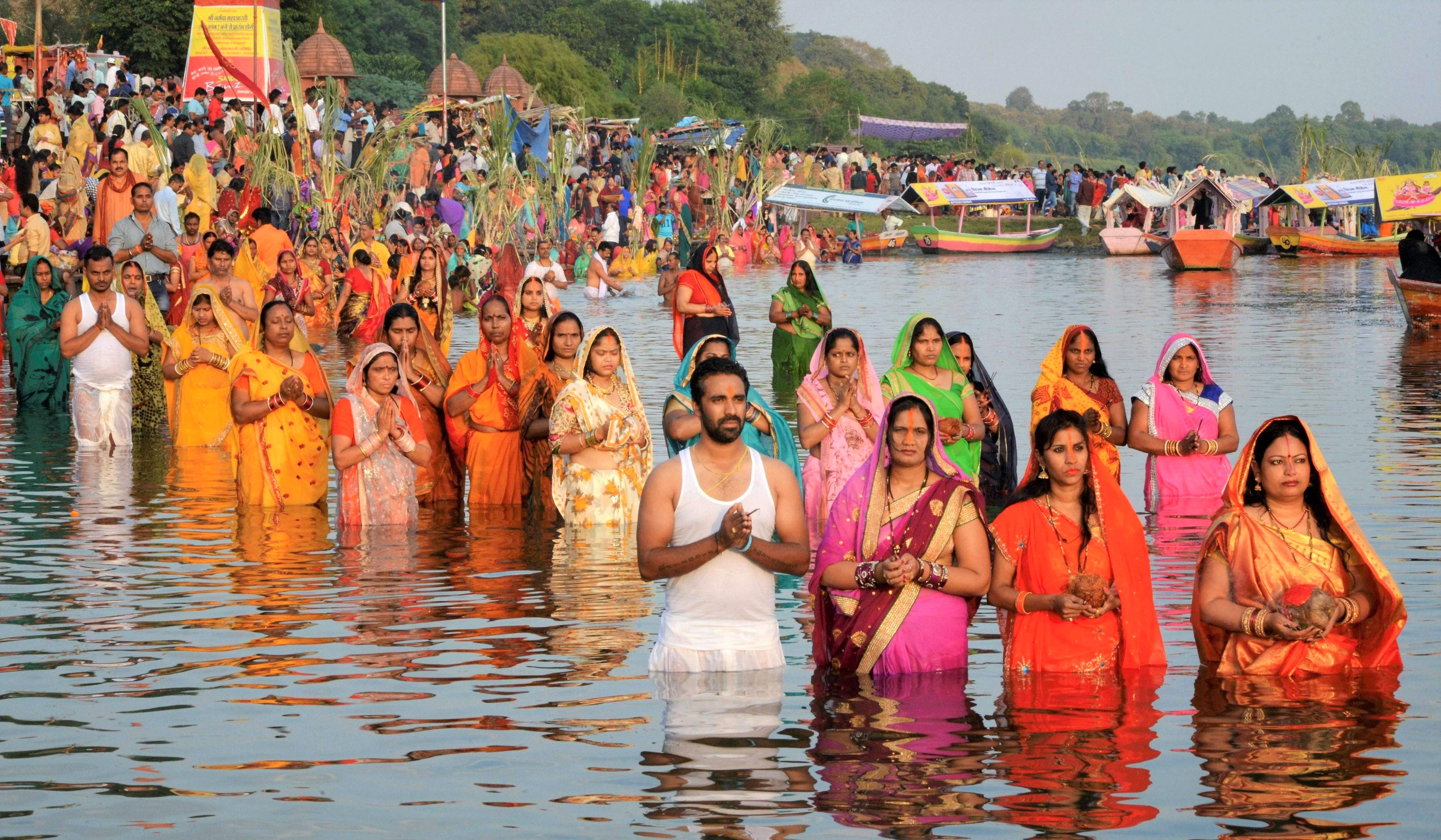
- Manikarnika Ghat, Varanasi Rajdari falls Gorakhnath Math, Gorakhpur Buddha's cremation stupa, Kushinagar Chhath
- Continent: Asia
- Country: India
- Languages: Bhojpuri
- State: Uttar Pradesh

Population (2023 estimate)
  - Total: 62.8 million

Purvanchal (lit. 'Eastern region') is the Bhojpuri region in eastern Uttar Pradesh. Purvanchal is also a proposed state in India, encompassing 32 eastern districts of Uttar Pradesh. The proposal, introduced in the Uttar Pradesh Legislative Assembly in 2011 by then Chief Minister Mayawati, aimed to divide Uttar Pradesh into four smaller states for improved administration and governance. The proposal was rejected by the central government.

== Proposal of Purvanchal as a Bhojpuri-speaking state ==
Since the late 20th century, there has been a demand for a separate Purvanchal state, carved out of the state of Uttar Pradesh and for Bhojpuri as the official language of Purvanchal state. Later, the issue of constitutional recognition of Bhojpuri came up when the constitution came into force. Rahul demanded for a separate Bhojpuri state by joining the Bhojpuri speaking regions of Bihar, United Provinces (now Uttar Pradesh) and Madhya Pradesh.

- 1968: The demand for a separate Bhojpuri state resurfaced in the late 1960s when the rightist organisation of eastern India, Anand Marg took up the issue. The Anand Margis organised a conference at the largest cattle fair of Asia, Sonepur Mela in 1968 and raised the demand for a separate state for the Bhojpuri-speaking people.
- 5 November 2006: Hundreds of Bhojpuri speaking people gathered in Bihar's Sasaram to demand creation of a separate Bhojpuri state for those who speak the language. Meeting under the aegis of the 21st All India Bhojpuri Sahitya Sammelan they demanded the creation of a separate state and protection of the interests of the people speaking Bhojpuri.
- 1 June 2008: A separate state can ensure the security of borders as well as overall development in which the region is lagging far behind in comparison to western and central Uttar Pradesh, said Yogi Adityanath (then a BJP Member of Parliament from Gorakhpur; he became Chief Minister of Uttar Pradesh in 2017).
- 7 December 2013: People associated with the Bhojpuri Andolan held a two-day convention at Taraiya in Saran district under the banner of Saran Pramandal Bhojpuri Sahitya Sammelan and demanded a separate state for Bhojpuriyas consisting of the Bhojpuri-speaking districts of Bihar, Uttar Pradesh, Jharkhand, Madhya Pradesh and Chhattisgarh.
- 2015: Thousands of people gathered at Shastri Ghat near Varuna river in Varanasi to demand the establishment of Purvanchal state with Varanasi as its capital. In this, Suhaldev Bharatiya Samaj Party's national president Om Prakash Rajbhar said that the central and state government should stop giving false assurances. The movement has started from the revolutionary land of Varanasi, now it is not going to stop. The wheel of development has completely stopped in Purvanchal since independence.
- 30 March 2017: BJP MP from Sasaram, Bihar, Chhedi Paswan evoked the demand of separate Purvanchal state to boost development in the Bhojpuri areas. He said that the formation of Purvanchal state is mandatory by joining the Bhojpuri speaking areas of Bihar and Uttar Pradesh and Varanasi as its capital.
- 16 May 2017: Members of Purvanchal Rajya Jan Andolan Sanstha staged a train stop demonstration in Banaras demanding the creation of a new Purvanchal state. The agitators kept shouting slogans in support of Purvanchal state while stopping the train.
- 8 July 2017: Union Minister Ramdas Athawale states his support for the division of the state for development of the region of the eastern Uttar Pradesh.
- 4 August 2018: Uttar Pradesh Minister Om Prakash Rajbhar demands separate statehood for Purvanchal, pushes for liquor ban.
- 11 March 2019: Rajkumar Ojha, convenor of the Purvanchal Rajya Gathan Morcha, started a three-day fast in the Collectorate premises of Jaunpur, demanding the creation of a separate Purvanchal state and formation of the State Reorganization Commission.
- 5 August 2021: Purvanchal Rajya Morcha officials raised the demand for separate Purvanchal state in Jaunpur, Uttar Pradesh.
- 18 December 2021: Twenty one thousand lamps were lit at Assi Ghat in Varanasi demanding a separate Purvanchal state.
- 26 June 2023: Under the banner of 'Purbiha Log Party', people have called for uniting the people and intensifying the demand for creating a separate Purvanchal state. Under this sequence, the first meeting of the District Working Committee of Purbiha Log Party was held in Padrauna of Kushinagar district, Uttar Pradesh.
- 16 September 2023: Members of Nagrik Vikas Party took out a strong procession for the formation of Purvanchal state in Ballia, Uttar Pradesh and handed over their 13-point demand letter to the SDM for the formation of a separate Purvanchal state.

== Culture ==
It is predominantly Bhojpuri-speaking region with several dialects. Western Bhojpuri prevalent in the areas of Varanasi, Chandauli, Azamgarh, Mirzapur (eastern parts), Sonbhadra (northern parts), Jaunpur (eastern parts), Ghazipur (western parts) and Mau (western parts). Northern Bhojpuri is prevalent in Gorakhpur, Sant Kabir Nagar, Siddharthnagar, Maharajganj, Deoria, Ambedkar Nagar and Kushinagar. Southern Bhojpuri is prevalent in Ballia, Ghazipur (eastern parts) and Mau (eastern parts).

== See also ==
- Bhojpuri region
