= List of people from Bihar =

Notable people from Bihar

This is a list of notable people from Bihar, India.

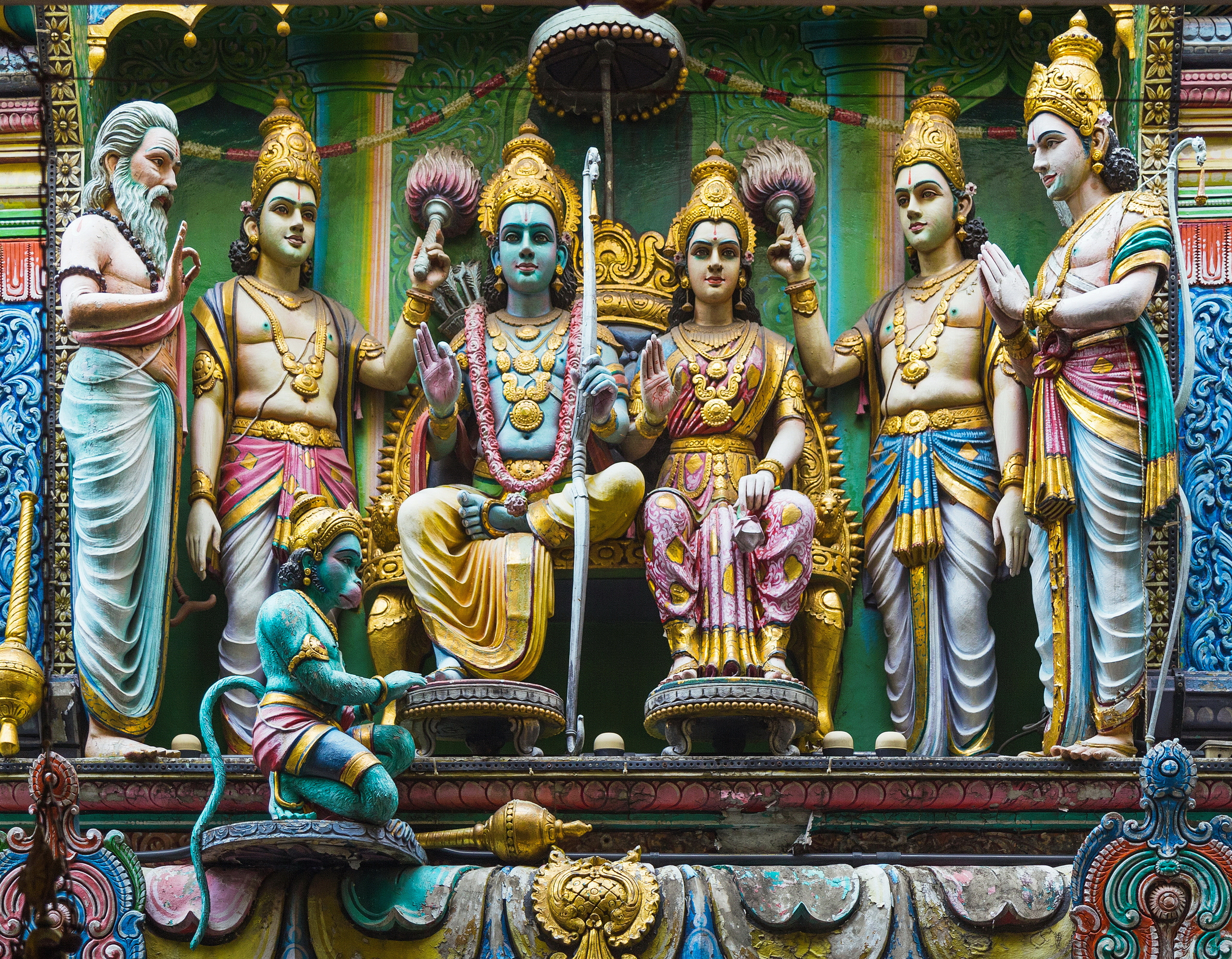
Sita

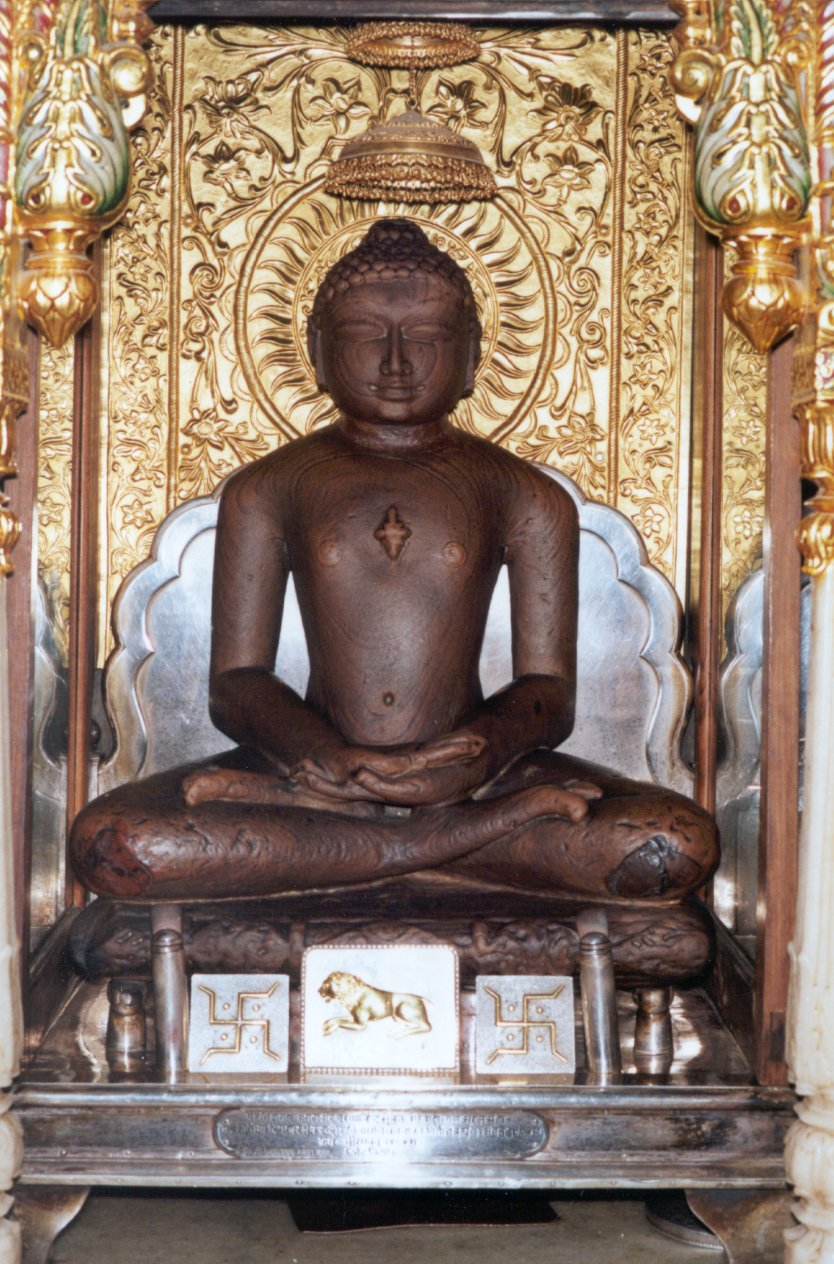
Lord Mahavir

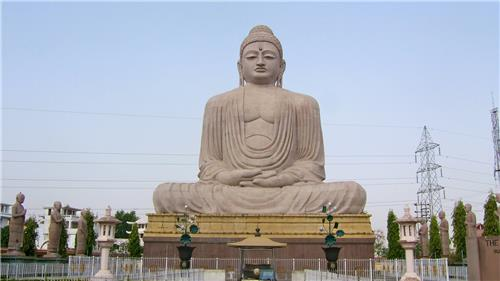
Lord Buddha

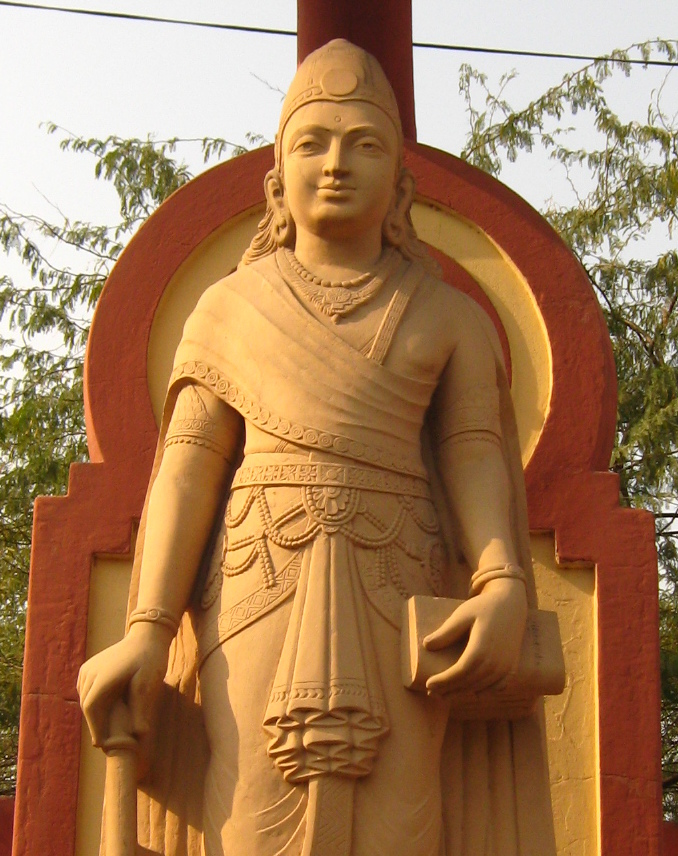
Chandragupta Maurya

== Deities and avatars ==
- Sita
- Vimalakirti
- Janaka
- The Buddha
- Mahavira
- Mallinatha
- Munisuvrata
- Naminatha
- Vasupujya

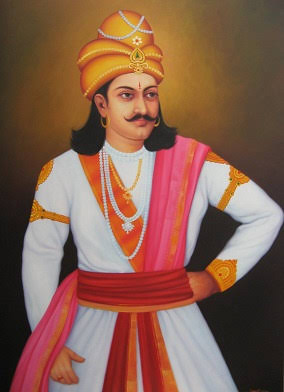
Samrat Ashoka

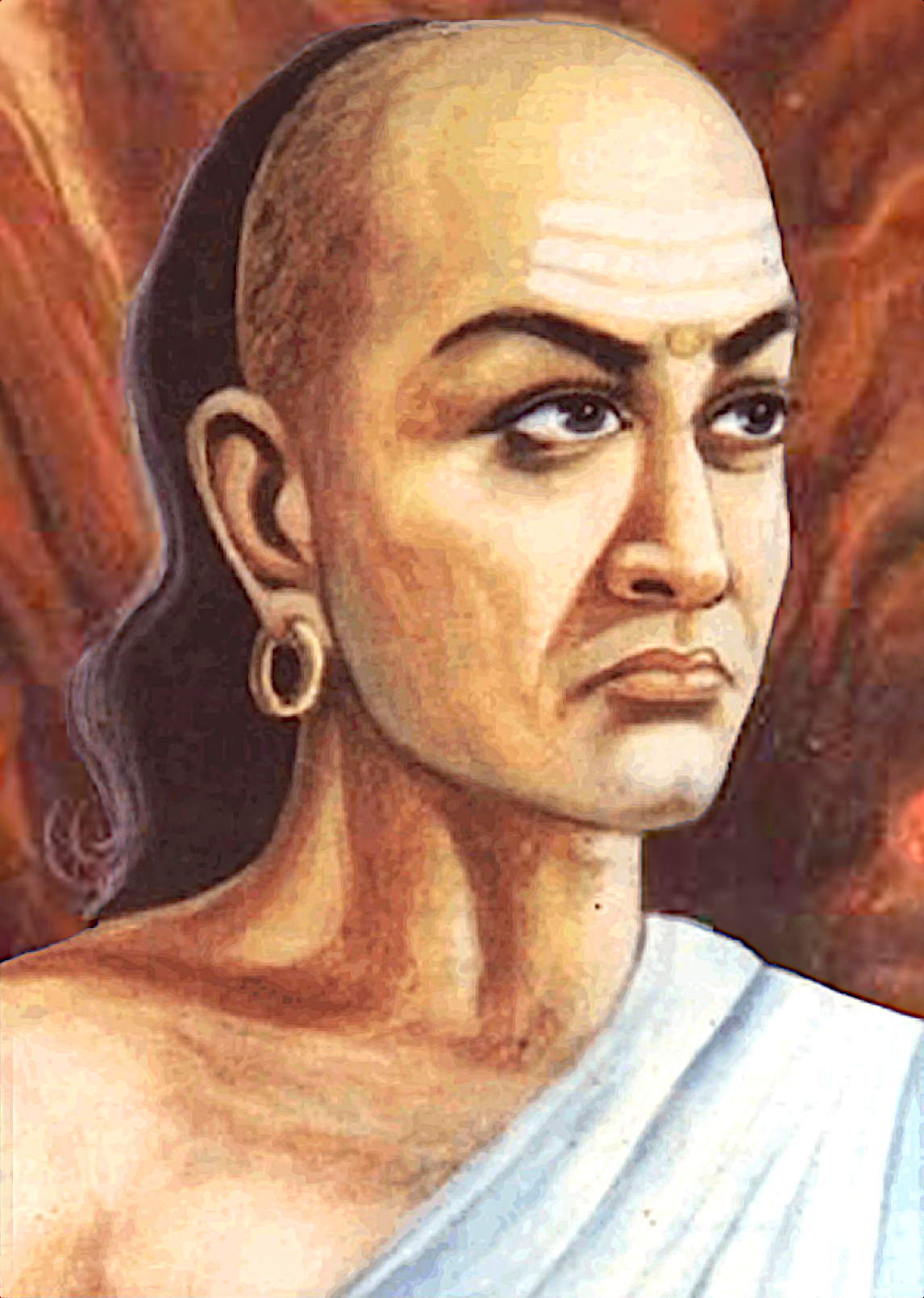
Chanakya

== Ancient ==
- Ajatashatru – King of Magadha
- Dhana Nanda – Last Nanda king
- Chandragupta Maurya – Founder of Maurya Empire
- Bindusara – Chandragupta's son
- Ashoka – Great Mauryan emperor
- Dasharatha Maurya – Ashoka's grandfather
- Samprati – Buddhist patron
- Shalishuka – Known for conflicts
- Devavarman – Mauryan ruler
- Shatadhanvan – Contemporary of Ashoka
- Brihadratha Maurya – Last Mauryan king
- Aryabhata – Ancient mathematician
- Samudragupta – Conqueror and ruler
- Chandragupta I – Established Gupta Empire
- Chanakya – Political strategist
- Vātsyāyana – Author of Kamasutra

== Medieval rulers ==
- Gangadeva - second king of the Karnats of Mithila
- Narsimhadeva - third king of the Karnats of Mithila
- Ramasimhadeva - fourth king of the Karnats of Mithila
- Harisimhadeva - final ruler of the Karnat dynasty
- Shri Pratapa - ruler of the Khayaravala dynasty
- Mahasenagupta - king belonging to the Later Gupta dynasty
- Sher Shah Suri – Padishāh of the Sur Empire

== Buddhist figures ==
- Śāriputra - one of the Buddha's ten principle disciples
- Maudgalyayana - one of the Buddha's ten principle disciples
- Mahākāśyapa - one of the Buddha's ten principle disciples
- Ratnākaraśānti - 11th century Buddhist philosopher
- Maitripada - 11th century Mahasiddha
- Prabhakāramitra - 7th century monk and translator active in China
- Dhyānabhadra - 14th century monk and translator active in Korea
- Śāriputra - 15th century monk and translator active in China

== Sufi saints ==
- Sharfuddin Yahya Maneri
- Sharfuddin Yahya Maneri
- Makhdoom Shah Muhammad Munim Pak
- Ata Hussain Fani Chishti
- Khwaja Abdullah Chishti
- Ibrahim Yukpasi

== Nationalists and independence activists ==
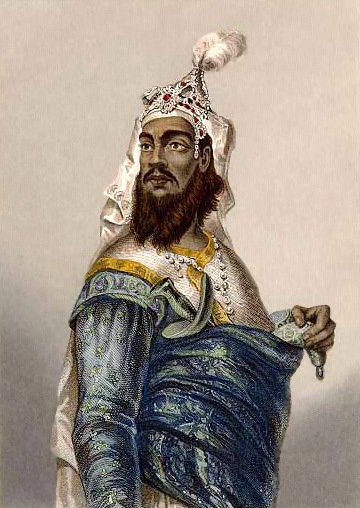
Portrait of Veer Kunwar Singh

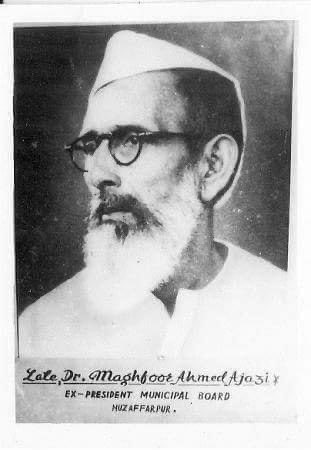
Maghfoor Ahmad Ajazi

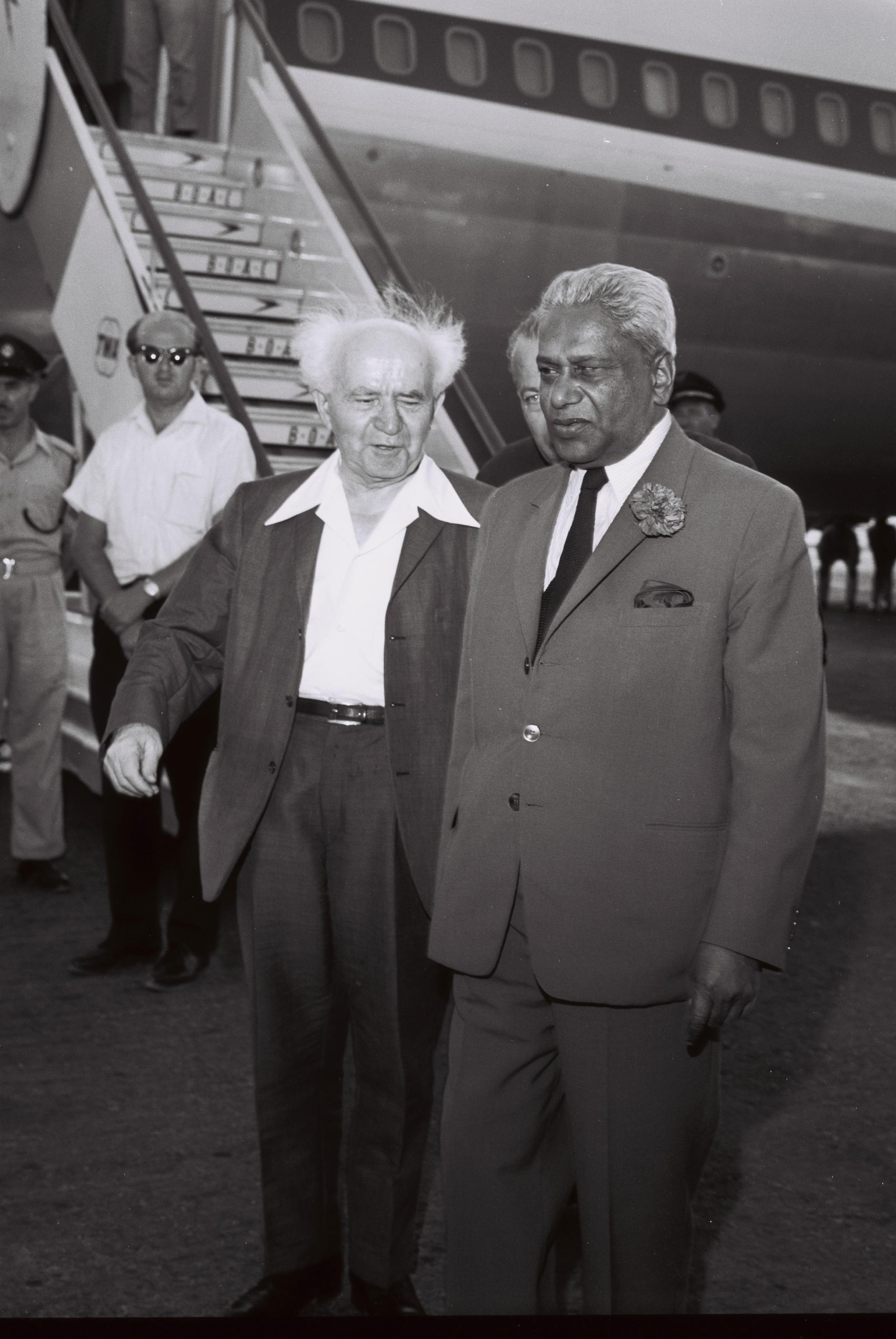
Seewoosagur Ramgoolam, the son of a Bihari immigrant, with David Ben Gurion at Lod airport, Israel, in 1962

- Ajit Kumar Mehta
- Babu Kunwar Singh
- Rajendra Prasad
- Ranjit Singh Yadav
- Rash Bihari Lal Mandal
- Chandradeo Prasad Verma
- Sri Krishna Singh
- Anugrah Narayan Sinha
- Jayaprakash Narayan
- Jagjivan Ram
- Jubba Sahni
- Ram Subhag Singh
- Kameshwar Singh
- Upendra Nath Verma
- Swami Sahajanand Saraswati
- Syed Hasan Imam
- Baikuntha Shukla
- Karyanand Sharma
- Thakur Jugal Kishore Sinha
- Satyendra Narayan Singh
- Ram Dulari Sinha
- Basawon Singh (Sinha)
- Yamuna Karjee
- Yogendra Shukla
- Sheel Bhadra Yagee
- Yadunandan Sharma
- Rambriksh Benipuri
- Ganga Sharan Singh (Sinha)
- Ram Narain Sharma
- Maghfoor Ahmad Ajazi
- Radhanandan Jha
- Seewoosagur Ramgoolam
- Babu Amar Singh
- Shashi Prasad Singh (died 1942), General Secretary of Bhagalpur District Congress Committee and martyr of the Quit India Movement.

== Writers and scholars ==
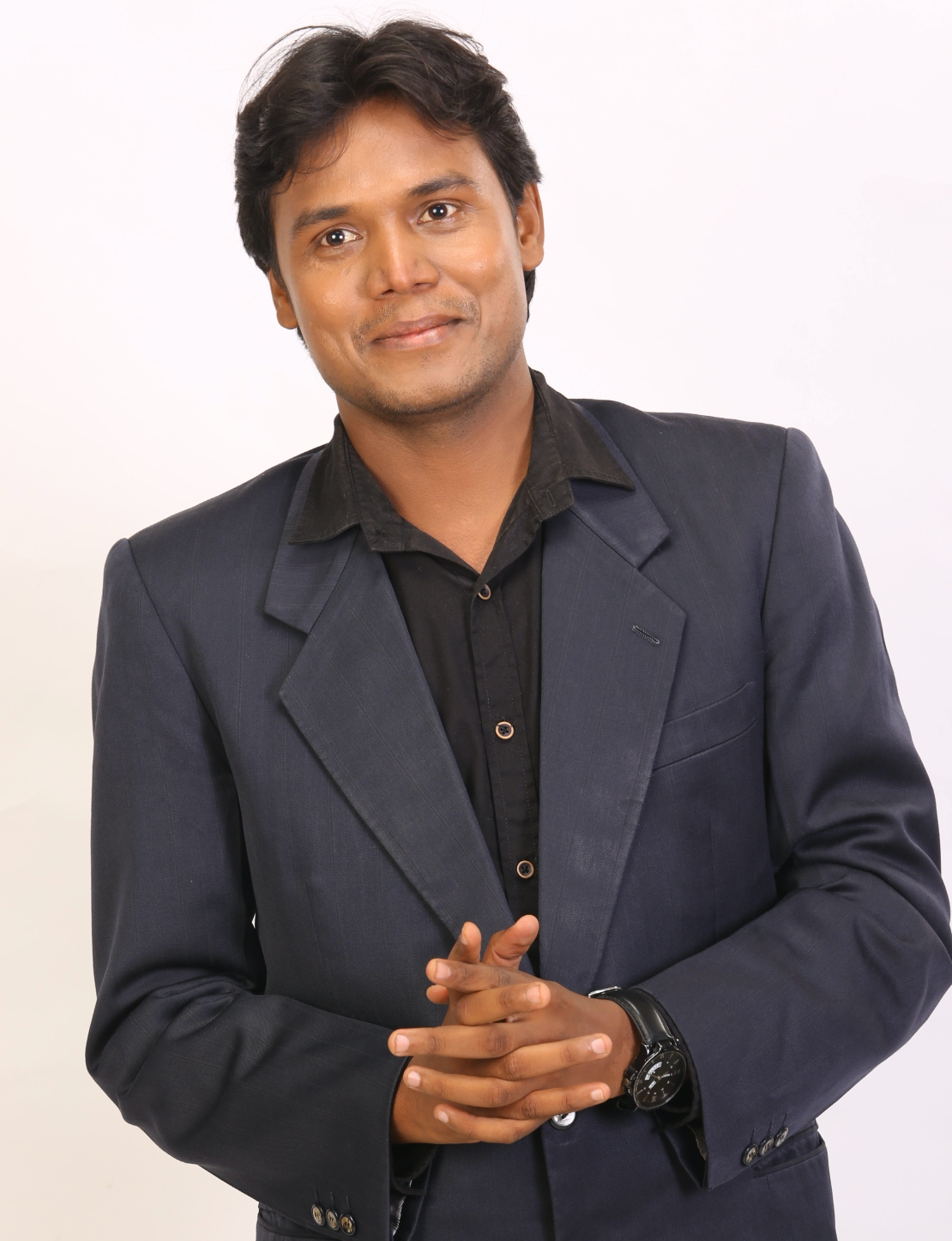
Satyapal Chandra (noted author, entrepreneur)

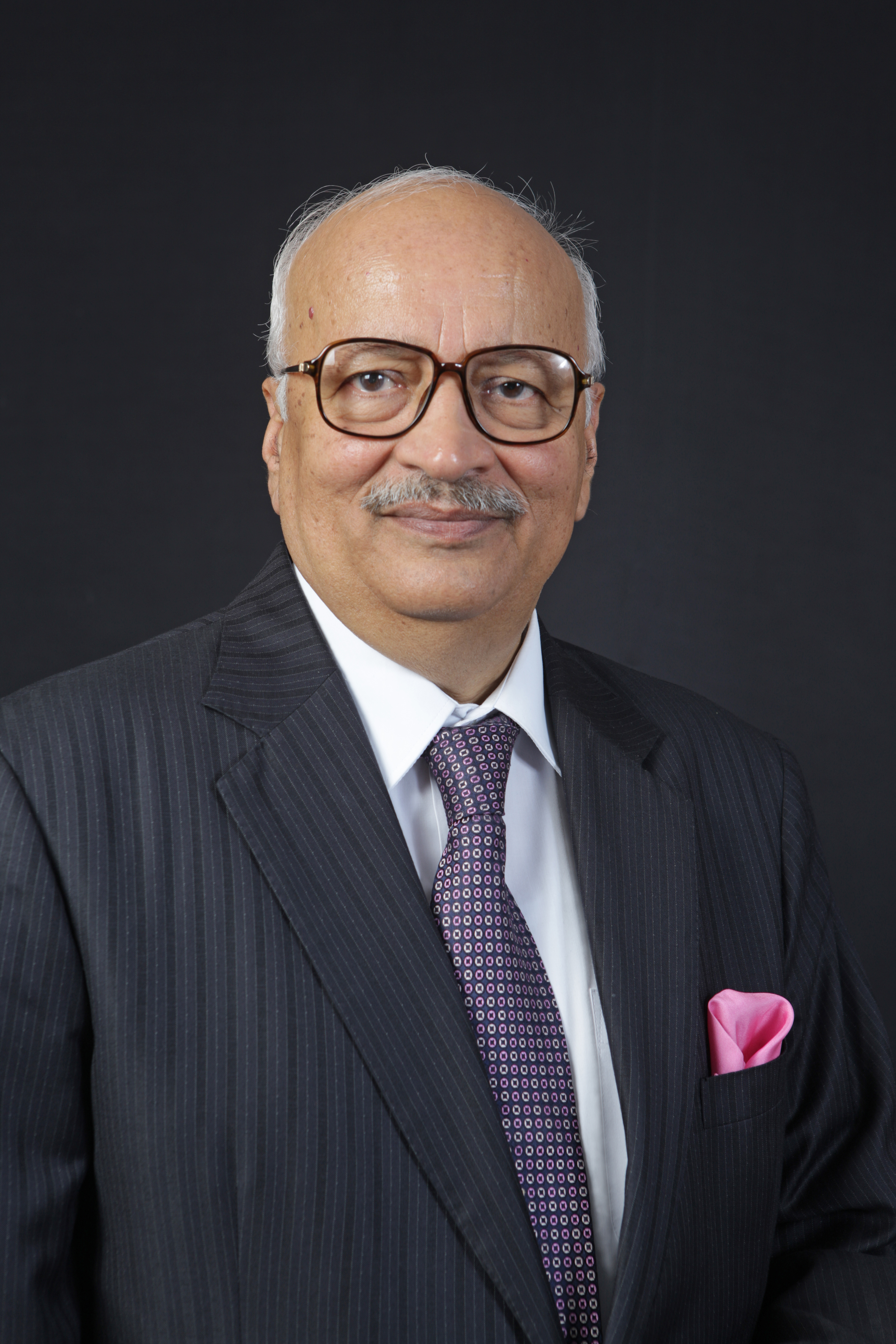
Balmiki Prasad Singh

- Caṇḍeśvara Ṭhakkura
- Prem Kumar Mani
- Syed Hasan
- Abdul Qavi Desnavi
- Swami Sahajanand Saraswati
- Ram Sharan Sharma
- Bibhutibhushan Mukhopadhyay
- Balmiki Prasad Singh
- Vidyapati
- Manoj Bhawuk
- Ramdhari Singh 'Dinkar'
- Ramvriksh Benipuri
- Devaki Nandan Khatri
- Indradeep Sinha
- Ram Karan Sharma
- Satyapal Chandra
- Mahamahopadhyaya Pandit Ram Avatar Sharma
- Nalin Vilochan Sharma
- Ganganath Jha
- R. K. Sinha
- Ramjee Singh
- Tabish Khair
- Acharya Ramlochan Saran
- Gopal Singh Nepali
- Ramesh Chandra Jha
- Acharya Rameshwar Jha
- Nagarjun
- Acharya Shivpujan Sahay
- Chandeshwar Prasad Narayan Singh
- Amitava Kumar
- Sanjeev K Jha
- Hetukar Jha
- Phanishwar Nath Renu
- Ravindra Prabhat
- Gajendra Thakur
- Kapil Muni Tiwary
- Shiv Khera
- Acharya Sarangdhar
- George Orwell

== Journalists ==
- Ajit Anjum
- M. J. Akbar
- Anuranjan Jha
- Ravish Kumar
- Ravindra Kishore Sinha
- Manoj Bhawuk
- Nivedita Jha
- Vikas Kumar Jha
- Arvind Narayan Das
- Dr. Amarendra Jha

== Authors ==
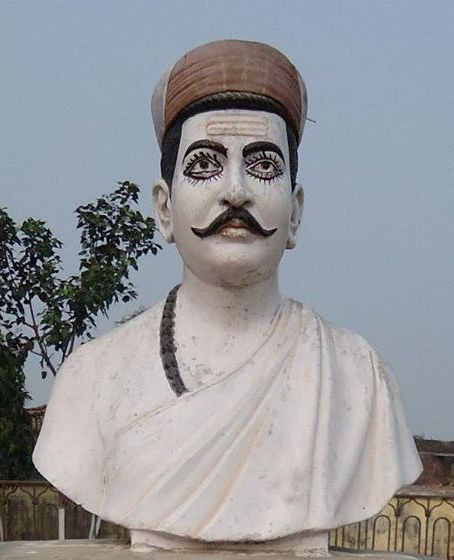
Statue of Maha Kavi Kokil Vidyapati

Authors by Language
Language	Authors
Hindi	Bhikhari Thakur; Ramdhari Singh 'Dinkar'; Rambriksh Benipuri; Gopal Singh Nepali; Phanishwar Nath Renu; Shankar Dayal Singh; Ramesh Chandra Jha; Sahajanand Saraswati; Kalanath Mishra; Nawal Kishore Dhawal
Maithili	Vidyapati; Nagarjun
Bhojpuri	Avinash Chandra Vidyarthi; Bhikhari Thakur; Dharni Das; Harihar Singh; Heera Dom; Mahendar Misir; Manoranjan Prasad Sinha; Manoj Bhawuk; Parichay Das; Ramesh Chandra Jha; Rameshwar Singh Kashyap; Raghuveer Narayan
Bengali	Bibhutibhushan Mukhopadhyay; Upamanyu Chatterjee; Malay Roy Choudhury
English	Ram Sharan Sharma; Raj Kamal Jha; Satyapal Chandra; George Orwell; Tabish Khair
Urdu	Bismil Azimabadi; Manazir Ahsan Gilani; Fuzail Ahmad Nasiri; Kalim Aajiz; Hussain Ul Haque; Mazhar Imam; Sohail Azimabadi; Shad Azimabadi; Raza Naqvi Wahi; Rashid-un-Nisa; Mukhtaruddin Ahmad

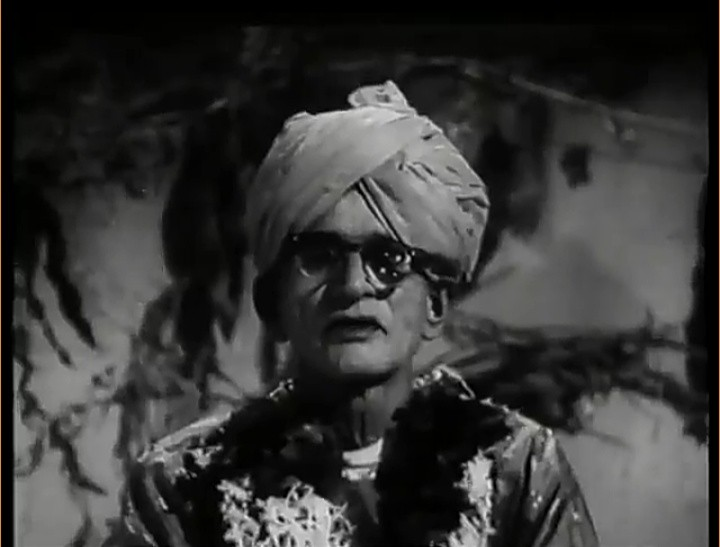
Bhikari Thakur

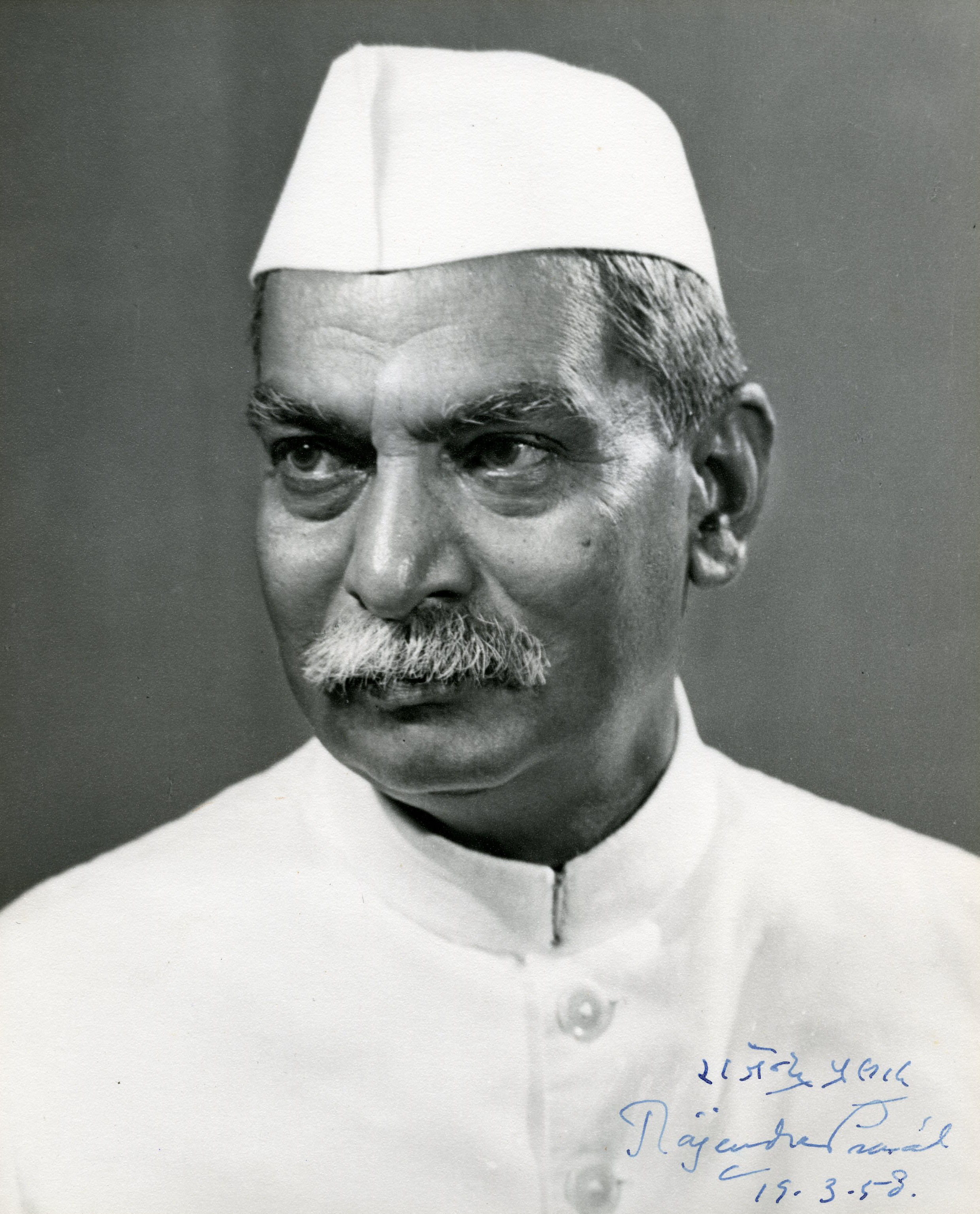
Rajendra Prasad

== National and international award winners ==
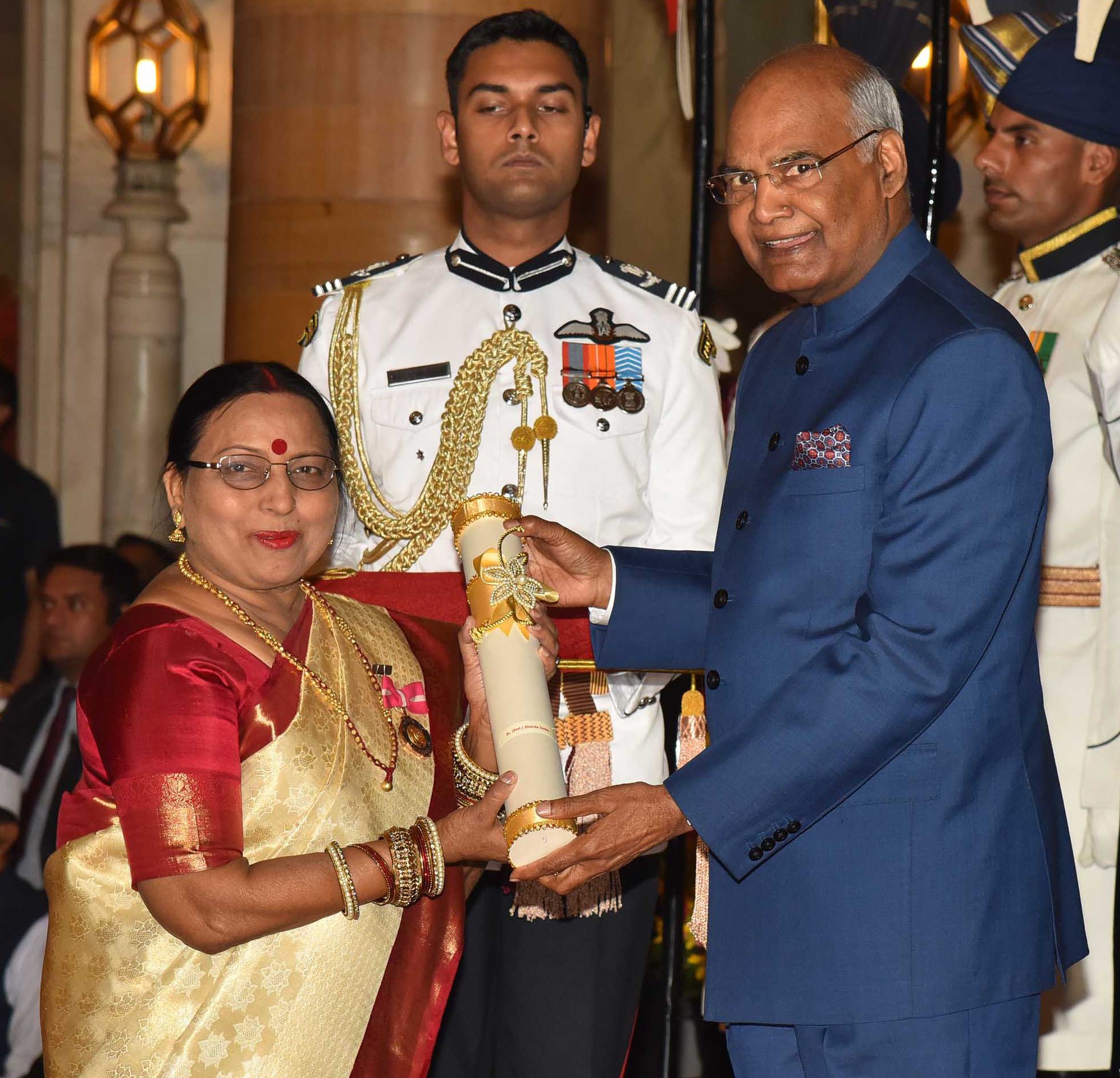
The President, Shri Ram Nath Kovind presenting the Padma Bhushan Award to Dr. (Smt.) Sharda Sinha

Award Winners
Award	Winners
Bharat Ratna	Bidhan Chandra Roy; Rajendra Prasad; Jayaprakash Narayan; Bismillah Khan
Padma Bhushan	Rashtrakavi Ramdhari Singh 'Dinkar'; Acharya Shivpujan Sahay; Bindeshwar Pathak; Sharda Sinha
Padma Shree	Ramchandra Manjhi; Seyed Ehtesham Hasnain; Mohan Mishra; Narendra Kumar Pandey; Janki Ballabh Shastri; Sharda Sinha; Chandreshwar Prasad Thakur
Jnanpith Award	Ramdhari Singh 'Dinkar'
Ramon Magsaysay Award	Ravish Kumar; Jayaprakash Narayan
Dadasaheb Phalke Award	Ashok Kumar; Tapan Sinha

== Military Gallantry Award winners ==
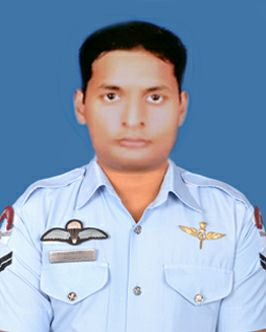
Jyoti Prakash Nirala, Ashok Chakra, Indian Air Force

=== Param Vir Chakra ===
- Albert Ekka

=== Ashoka Chakra ===
- Jyoti Prakash Nirala

== Holders of high constitutional offices ==
=== Presidents of India ===
- Rajendra Prasad, first president of India

=== Presidents of other countries ===
- Kailash Purryag, former president of Mauritius
- Cheddi Jagan, former president of Guyana

=== Vice-Presidents of other countries ===
- Parmanand Jha, first vice-president of Nepal

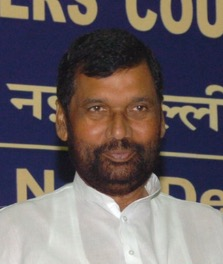
Ramvilas Paswan

=== Prime ministers of other countries ===
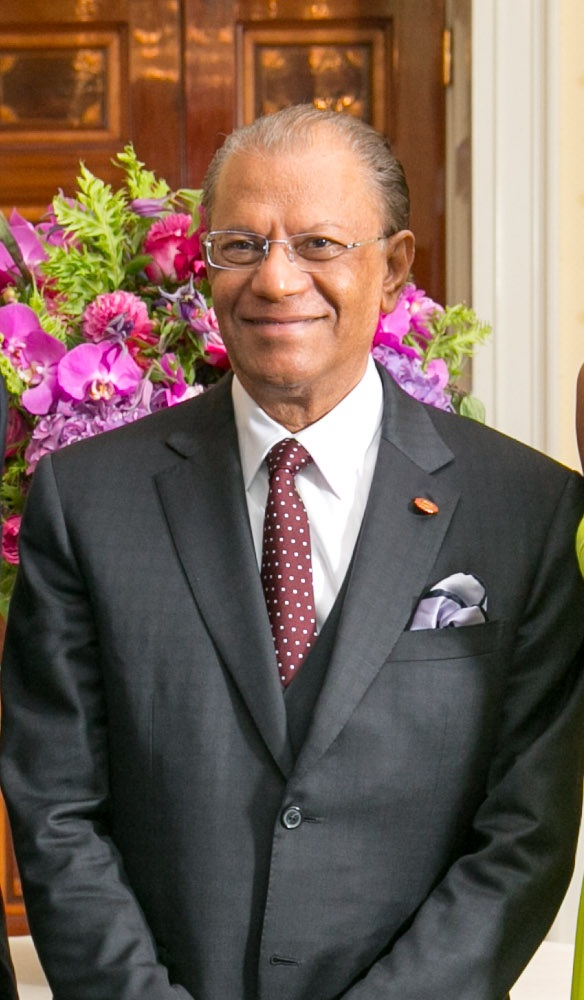
Navinchandra Ramgoolam, former Prime Minister of Mauritius

- Seewoosagur Ramgoolam, first prime minister of Mauritius
- Navin Ramgoolam, former prime minister of Mauritius
- Girija Prasad Koirala, former prime minister of Nepal
- Basdeo Panday, former prime minister of Trinidad and Tobago
- Kamla Persad-Bissessar, former first female prime minister of Trinidad and Tobago

=== Attorneys general of India ===
- L.N. Sinha

=== Advocate General of state of Bihar ===
- Rambalak Mahto, longest serving Advocate General of Bihar and legal advisor of Nitish Kumar

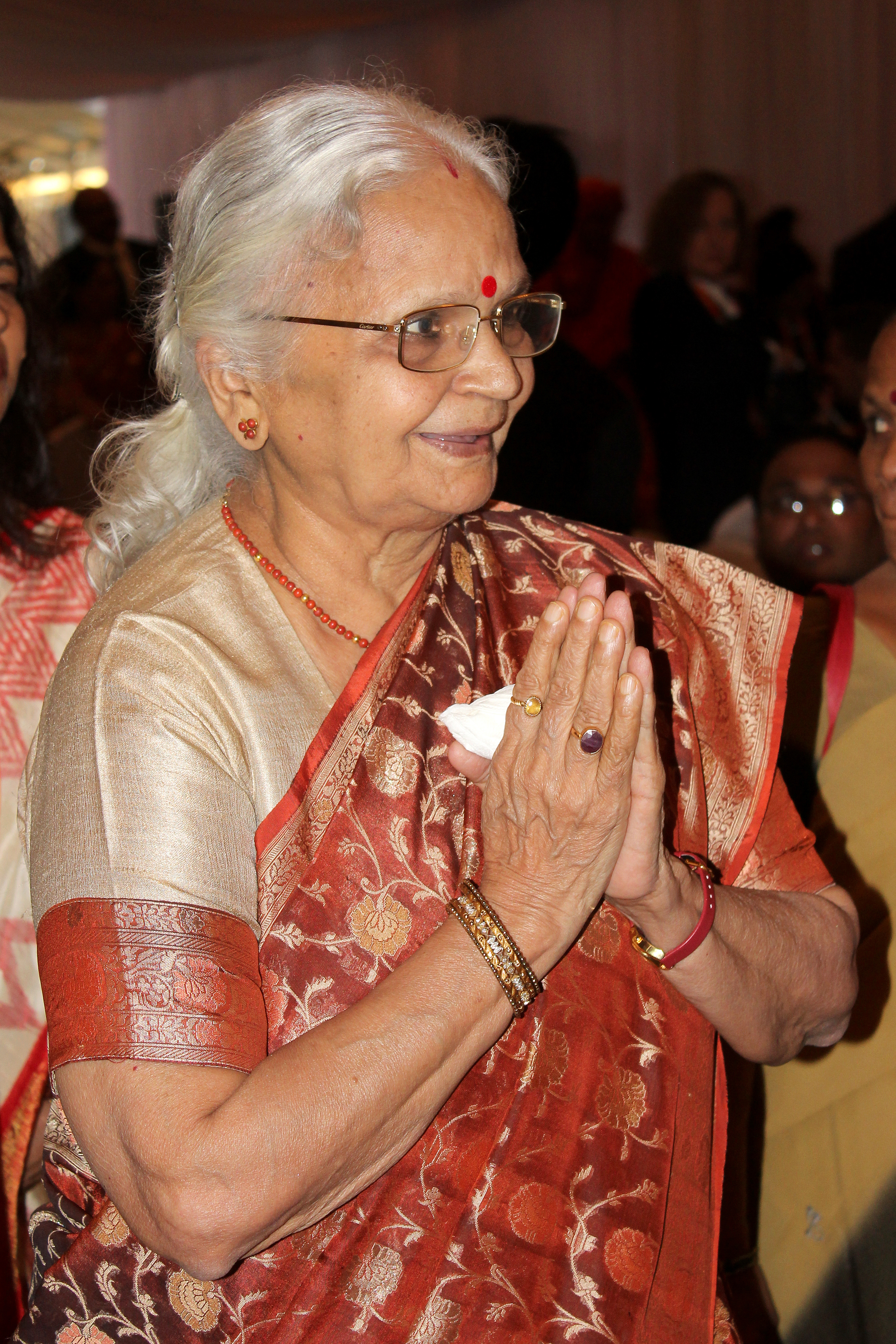
Mridula Sinha

=== Governors of Indian states ===
- Anant Sharma, former governor of Punjab and West Bengal
- Balmiki Prasad Singh, current governor of Sikkim
- Chandeshwar Prasad Narayan Singh, former governor of Punjab
- Dinesh Nandan Sahay, former governor of Chhattisgarh
- Kailashpati Mishra, former governor of Gujarat
- Lallan Prasad Singh, former governor of Assam
- Mridula Sinha, current governor of Goa
- Nikhil Kumar, current governor of Kerala
- Prabhat Kumar, former governor of Jharkhand
- Rameshwar Thakur, former governor of Madhya Pradesh
- Ram Dulari Sinha, former governor of Kerala
- Siddheshwar Prasad, former governor of Tripura
- Srinivas Kumar Sinha, former governor of Jammu and Kashmir and Assam

=== Governor of Reserve Bank of India ===
- Lakshmi Kant Jha

=== Lieutenant governors of other states ===
- Tejendra Khanna
- Nagendra Nath Jha

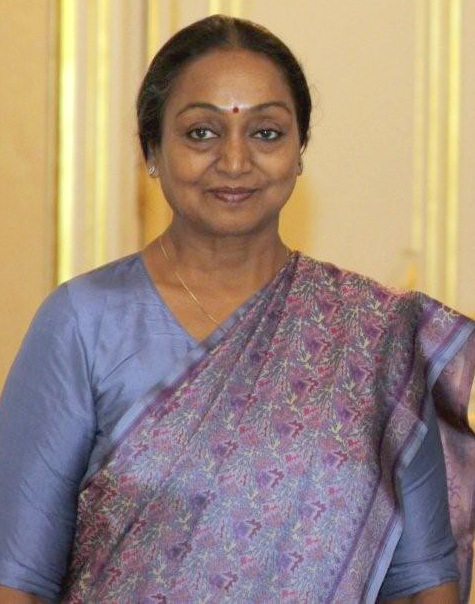
Smt. Meira Kumar

=== Speakers of Lok Sabha ===
- Bali Ram Bhagat
- Meira Kumar

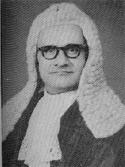
Bhuvneshwar Prasad Sinha

=== Chief justices of India ===
- Bhuvaneshwar Prasad Sinha
- Lalit Mohan Sharma

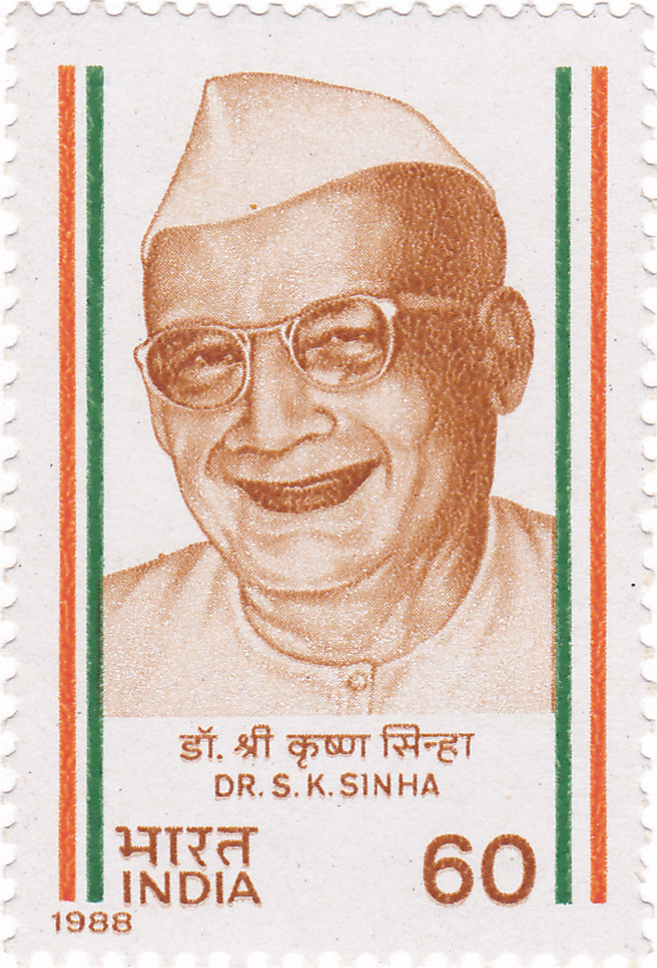
Shri Krishna Singh, First chief minister of Bihar

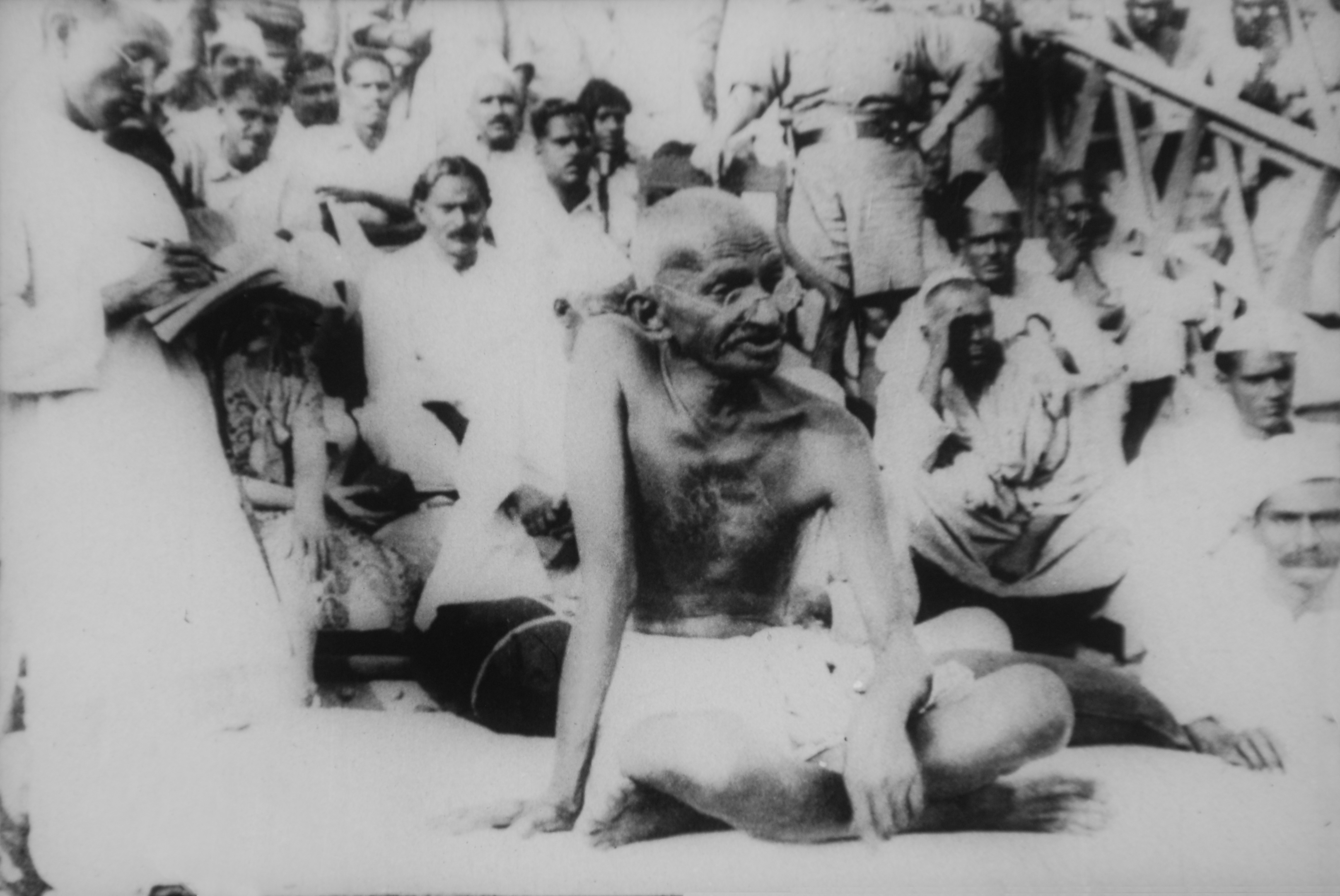
Mahatma Gandhi in Bihar

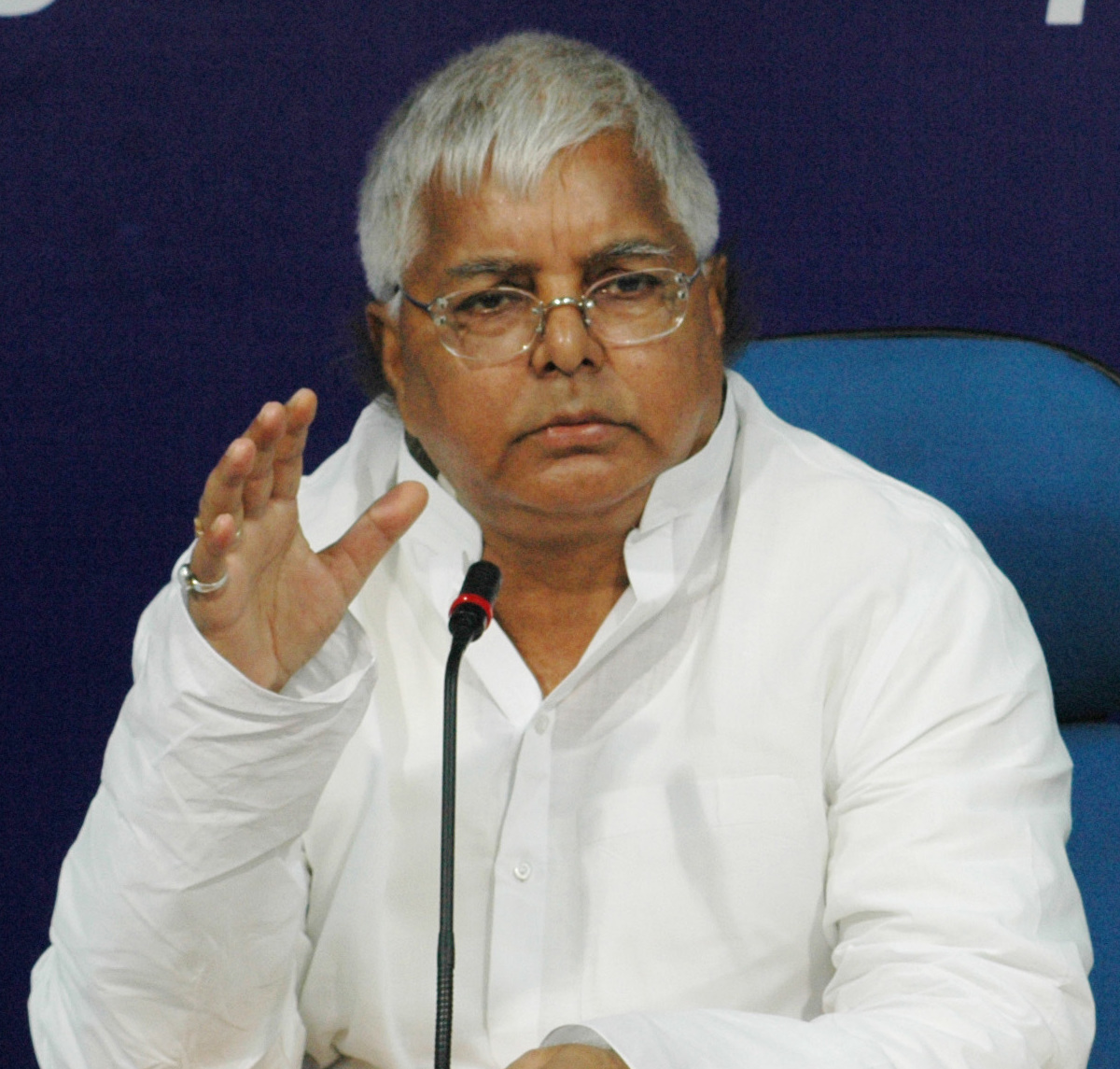
Lalu Yadav

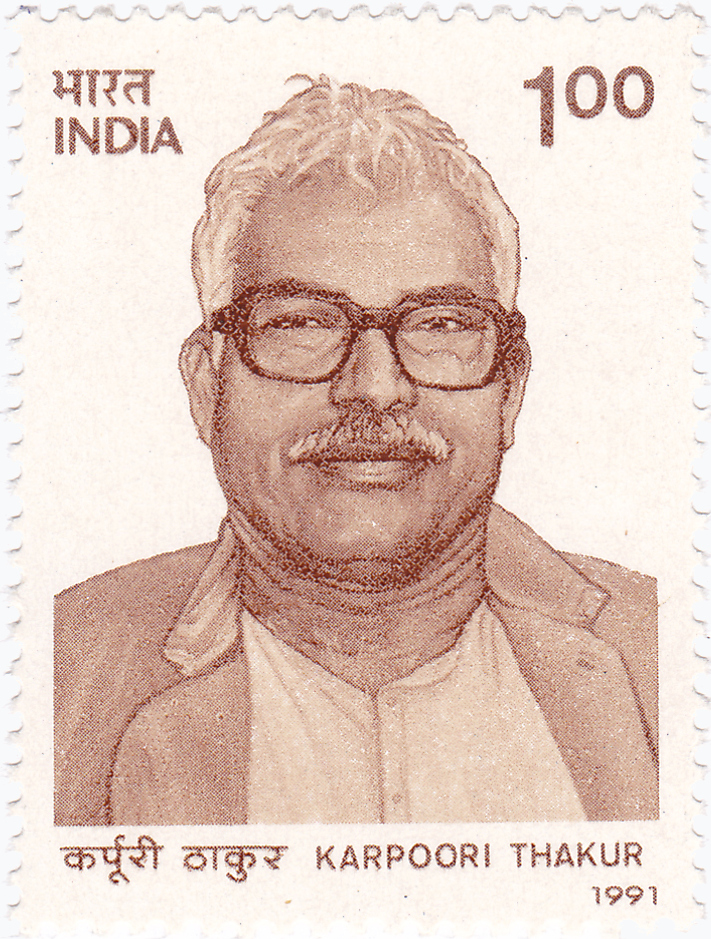
Karpoori Thakur

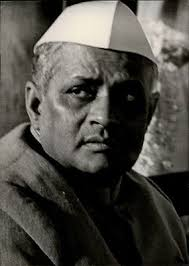
Ram Subhag Singh

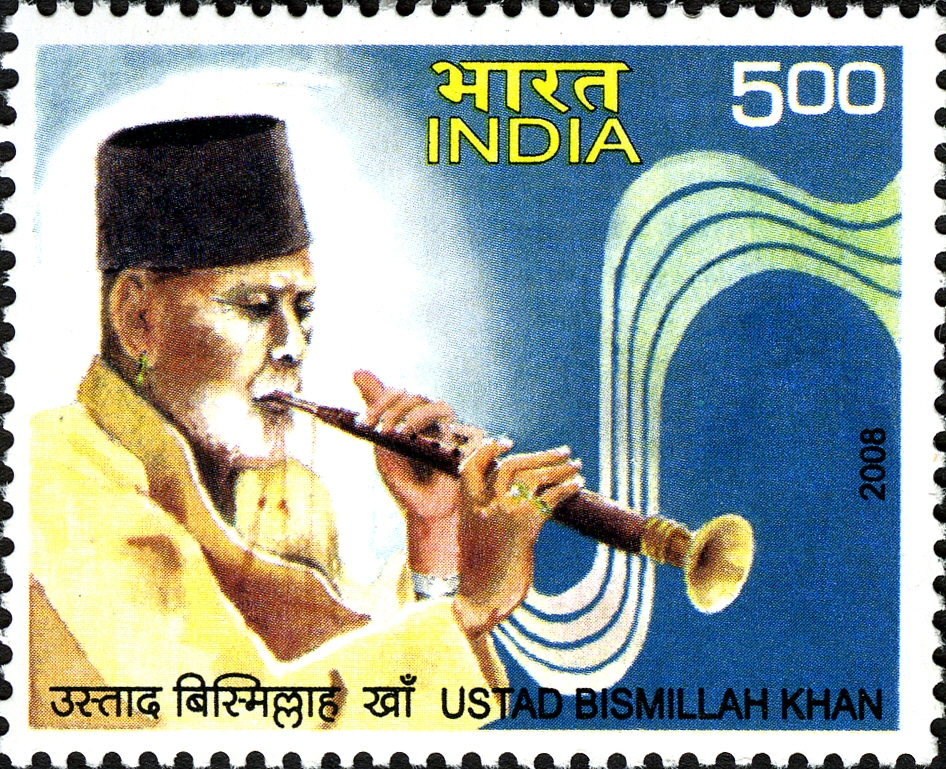
Ustad Bismillah Khan

=== Chief ministers ===
#	Name	Took office	Left office	Political party
1	Shri Krishna Sinha	2 April 1946	31 January 1961	Indian National Congress
2	Deep Narayan Singh	1 February 1961	18 February 1961	Indian National Congress
3	Binodanand Jha	18 February 1961	2 October 1963	Indian National Congress
4	Krishana Ballabh Sahay	2 October 1963	5 March 1967	Indian National Congress
5	Mahamaya Prasad Sinha	5 March 1967	28 January 1968	Jana Kranti Dal
6	Satish Prasad Singh	28 January 1968	1 February 1968	Indian National Congress
7	B. P. Mandal	1 February 1968	2 March 1968	Shoshit Dal
8	Bhola Paswan Shashtri	22 March 1968	29 June 1968	Indian National Congress (O)
	President's rule	29 June 1968	26 February 1969	
9	Harihar Singh	26 February 1969	22 June 1969	Indian National Congress
10	Bhola Paswan Shashtri	22 June 1969	4 July 1969	Indian National Congress (O)
	President's rule	6 July 1969	16 February 1970	
11	Daroga Prasad Rai	16 February. 1970	22 December 1970	Indian National Congress
12	Karpuri Thakur	22 December 1970	2 June 1971	Socialist Party
13	Bhola Paswan Shashtri	2 June 1971	9 January 1972	Indian National Congress
	President's rule	9 January 1972	19 March 1972	
14	Kedar Pandey	19 March 1972	2 July 1973	Indian National Congress
15	Abdul Gafoor	2 July 1973	11 April 1975	Indian National Congress
16	Jagannath Mishra	11 April 1975	30 April 1977	Indian National Congress
	President's rule	30 April 1977	24 June 1977	
17	Karpuri Thakur	24 June 1977	21 April 1979	Janata Party
18	Ram Sunder Das	21 April 1979	17 February 1980	Janata Party
	President's rule	17 February 1980	8 June 1980	
19	Jagannath Mishra	8 June 1980	14 August 1983	Indian National Congress (I)
20	Chandrashekhar Singh	14 August 1983	12 March 1985	Indian National Congress (I)
21	Bindeshwari Dubey	12 March 1985	13 February 1988	Indian National Congress (I)
22	Bhagwat Jha Azad	14 February 1988	10 March 1989	Indian National Congress (I)
23	Satyendra Narayan Singh	11 March 1989	6 December 1989	Indian National Congress (I)
24	Jagannath Mishra	6 December 1989	10 March 1990	Indian National Congress (I)
25	Laloo Prasad Yadav	10 March 1990	3 March 1995	Janata Dal
26	Laloo Prasad Yadav	4 April 1995	25 July 1997	Janata Dal, Rashtriya Janata Dal
27	Rabri Devi	25 July 1997	11 February 1999	Rashtriya Janata Dal
28	Rabri Devi	9 March 1999	2 March 2000	Rashtriya Janata Dal
29	Nitish Kumar	3 March 2000	10 March 2000	Janata Dal (United)
30	Rabri Devi	11 March 2000	6 March 2005	Rashtriya Janata Dal
	President's rule	7 March 2005	24 November 2005	
31	Nitish Kumar	24 November 2005	24 November 2010	Janata Dal (United)
32	Nitish Kumar	26 November 2010	17 May 2014	Janata Dal (United)
33	Jitan Ram Manjhi	20 May 2014	22 Feb 2015	Janata Dal (United)
34	Nitish Kumar	22 Feb 2015	Present	Janata Dal (United)

=== Deputy chief ministers ===
#	Name	Took office	Left office	Party
1	Anugrah Narayan Sinha	2 April 1946	5 July 1957	Indian National Congress
2	Karpoori Thakur	5 March 1967	31 January 1968	Socialist Party
3	Ram Jaipal Singh Yadav	3 June 1971	9 January 1972	Indian National Congress
4	Sushil Kumar Modi	24 Nov 2005	16 June 2013	Bharatiya Janata Party
5	Tejashwi Yadav	20 November 2015	26 July 2017	Rashtriya Janata Dal
6	Sushil Kumar Modi	27 July 2017	16 November 2020	Bharatiya Janata Party
7	Tarkishore Prasad	16 November 2020	9 August 2022	Bharatiya Janata Party
7	Renu Devi	16 November 2020	9 August 2022	Bharatiya Janata Party
8	Tejashwi Yadav	10 August 2022	28 January 2024	Rashtriya Janata Dal
9	Vijay Sinha	28 January 2024	Incumbent	Bharatiya Janata Party
9	Samrat Choudhary	28 January 2024	Incumbent	Bharatiya Janata Party

=== Members of Lok Sabha ===
#	Constituency	Member of Parliament	Political party
1	Valmiki Nagar	Sunil Kumar	Janata Dal (United)
2	Paschim Champaran	Sanjay Jaiswal	Bharatiya Janata Party
3	Purvi Champaran	Radha Mohan Singh	Bharatiya Janata Party
4	Sheohar	Rama Devi	Bharatiya Janata Party
5	Sitamarhi	Sunil Kumar Pintu	Janata Dal (United)
6	Madhubani	Ashok Kumar Yadav	Bharatiya Janata Party
7	Jhanjharpur	Ramprit Mandal	Janata Dal (United)
8	Supaul	Dileshwar Kamait	Janata Dal (United)
9	Araria	Pradeep Kumar Singh	Bharatiya Janata Party
10	Kishanganj	Mohammad Jawed	Indian National Congress
11	Katihar	Dulal Chandra Goswami	Janata Dal (United)
12	Purnia	Santosh Kumar	Janata Dal (United)
13	Madhepura	Dinesh Chandra Yadav	Janata Dal (United)
14	Darbhanga	Gopal Jee Thakur	Bharatiya Janata Party
15	Muzaffarpur	Ajay Nishad	Bharatiya Janata Party
16	Vaishali	Veena Devi	Lok Janshakti Party (Ram Vilas)
17	Gopalganj	Alok Kumar Suman	Janata Dal (United)
18	Siwan	Kavita Singh	Janata Dal (United)
19	Maharajganj	Janardan Singh Sigriwal	Bharatiya Janata Party
20	Saran	Rajiv Pratap Rudy	Bharatiya Janata Party
21	Hajipur	Chirag Paswan	Lok Janshakti Party (Ram Vilas)
22	Ujiarpur	Nityanand Rai	Bharatiya Janata Party
23	Samastipur	Shambhavi Choudhary	Lok Janshakti Party (Ram Vilas)
24	Begusarai	Giriraj Singh	Bharatiya Janata Party
25	Khagaria	Rajesh Verma	Lok Janshakti Party (Ram Vilas)
26	Bhagalpur	Ajay Kumar Mandal	Janata Dal (United)
27	Banka	Giridhari Yadav	Janata Dal (United)
28	Munger	Lalan Singh	Janata Dal (United)
29	Nalanda	Kaushalendra Kumar	Janata Dal (United)
30	Patna Sahib	Ravi Shankar Prasad	Bharatiya Janata Party
31	Pataliputra	Ram Kripal Yadav	Bharatiya Janata Party
32	Arrah	Raj Kumar Singh	Bharatiya Janata Party
33	Buxar	Ashwini Kumar Choubey	Bharatiya Janata Party
34	Sasaram	Chhedi Paswan	Bharatiya Janata Party
35	Karakat	Mahabali Singh	Janata Dal (United)
36	Jahanabad	Chandeshwar Prasad	Janata Dal (United)
37	Aurangabad	Sushil Kumar Singh	Bharatiya Janata Party
38	Gaya	Vijay Kumar Manjhi	Janata Dal (United)
39	Nawada	Vivek Thakur	BJP
40	Jamui	Arun Bharti	Lok Janshakti Party (Ram Vilas)

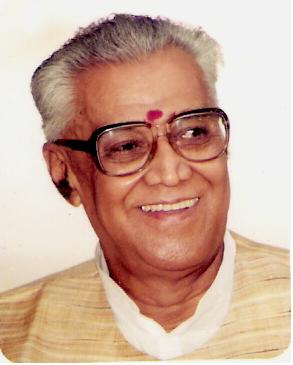
Rajo Singh

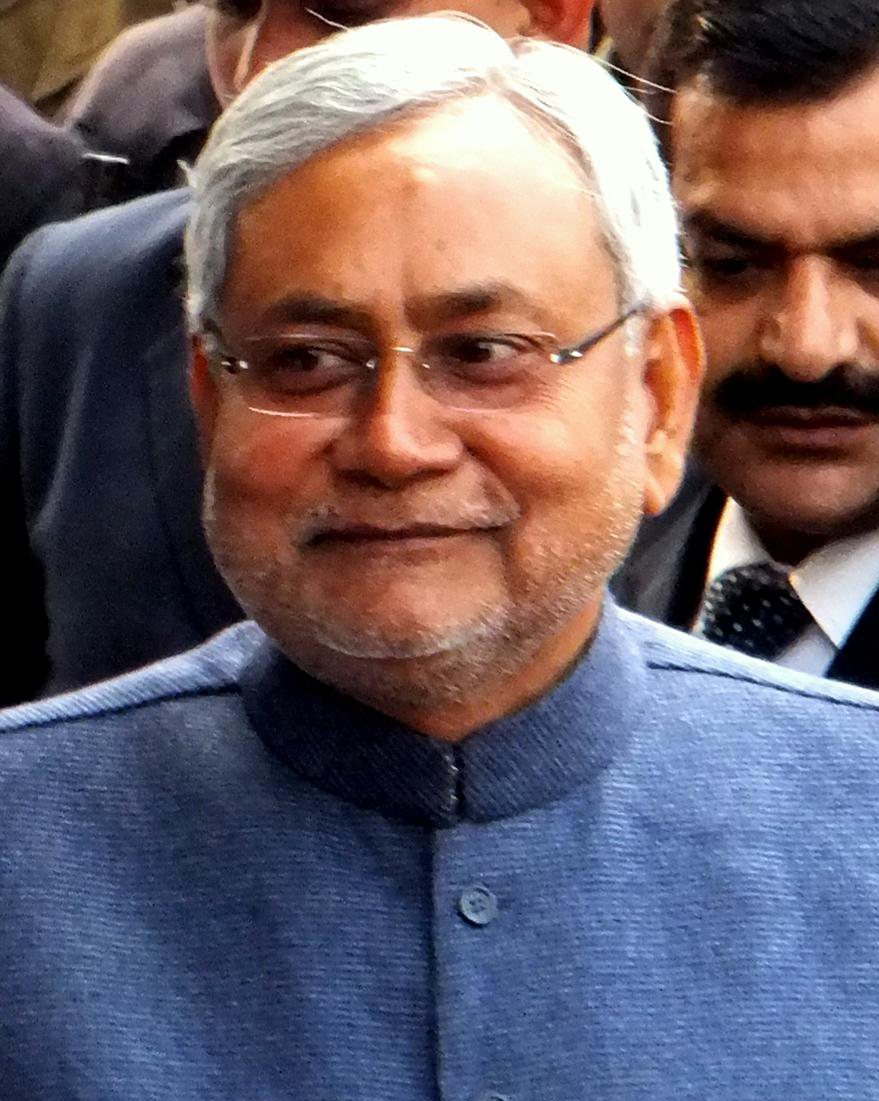
Nitish Kumar

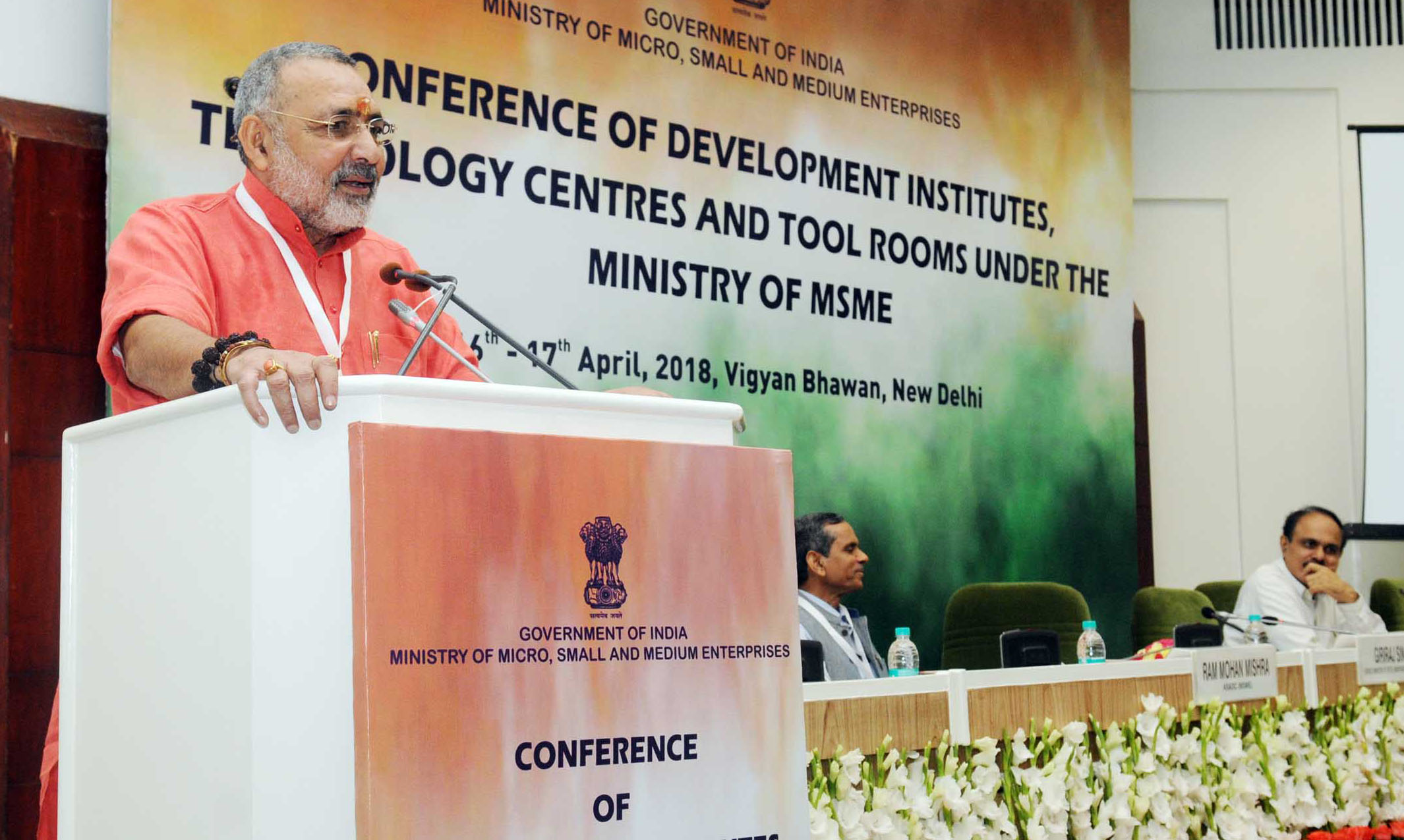
Giriraj Singh

=== Members of Rajya Sabha (2022) ===
#	Political party	Member of Parliament
1	Rashtriya Janata Dal	Manoj Kumar Jha
2	Rashtriya Janata Dal	Misa Bharti
3	Rashtriya Janata Dal	Dr. Faiyaz Ahmad
4	Rashtriya Janata Dal	Prem Chand Gupta
5	Rashtriya Janata Dal	Amarendra Dhari Singh
6	Rashtriya Janata Dal	Ahmad Ashfaque Karim
7	Janata Dal (United)	Harivansh Narayan Singh
8	Janata Dal (United)	Ram Nath Thakur
9	Janata Dal (United)	Khiru Mahto
10	Janata Dal (United)	Bashistha Narain Singh
11	Janata Dal (United)	Anil Hegde
12	Indian National Congress	Akhilesh Prasad Singh
13	Bharatiya Janata Party	Vivek Thakur
14	Bharatiya Janata Party	Sushil Kumar Modi
15	Bharatiya Janata Party	Shambhu Sharan Patel
16	Bharatiya Janata Party	Satish Chandra Dubey

=== Spokesperson ===
- Syed Shahnawaz Hussain (Bharatiya Janata Party)
- Ravi Shankar Prasad (Bharatiya Janata Party)
- Shakeel Ahmad (Indian National Congress)
- Rajiv Pratap Rudy (Bharatiya Janata Party)

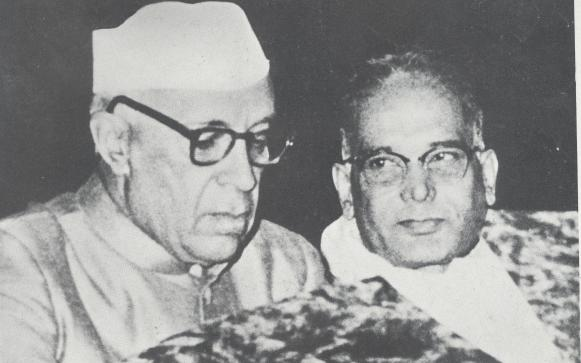
Jayaprakash Narayan with Jawaharlal Nehru

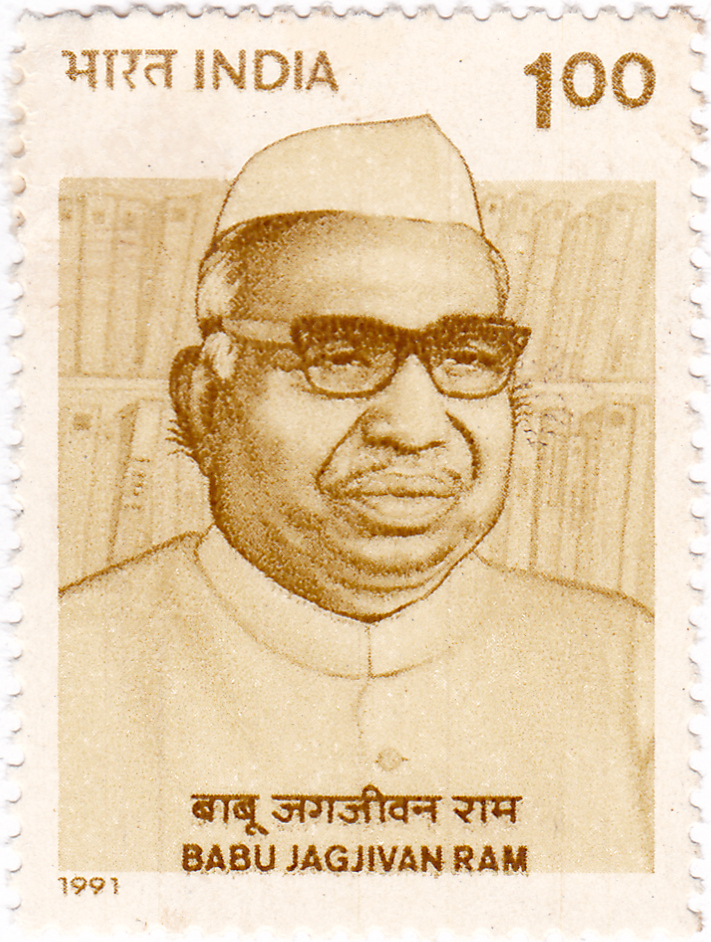
Jagjivan Ram

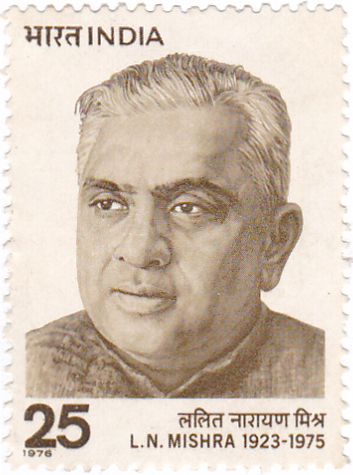
Lalit Narayan Mishra

== Politics ==
- Rati Lal Prasad Verma
- Ramdeo Mahto
- Ajit Kumar Mehta
- Chandradeo Prasad Verma
- Rajendra Prasad
- Jayaprakash Narayan
- Anugrah Narayan Sinha
- Sri Krishna Sinha
- Chandipat Sahay
- Jagjivan Ram
- Ram Subhag Singh
- B.P.Mandal
- Lalit Narayan Mishra
- Lalita Kumari
- Thakur Jugal Kishore Sinha
- Ram Dulari Sinha
- Shatrughan Prasad Singh
- Satyendra Narayan Singh
- Karpoori Thakur
- Daroga Prasad Rai
- Deep Narayan Singh
- Abdul Ghafoor
- Chandrashekhar Singh
- Gopal Jee Thakur
- Chirag Paswan
- Faz Husain
- Kailashpati Mishra
- Lalu Prasad Yadav
- Nitish Kumar
- Upendra Kushwaha
- Nikhil Kumar
- Indradeep Sinha
- Digvijay Narain Singh
- Kapildeo Singh
- Bidhu Jha
- Ravi Shankar Prasad
- Gauri Shankar Pandey
- Tarkeshwari Sinha
- Shyam Nandan Prasad Mishra
- Krishna Kumar Mishra
- Srinivas Kumar Sinha
- Yashwant Sinha
- Ravindra Kishore Sinha
- Prabhat Jha
- Sanjay Nirupam
- Mohammad Yunus
- Nawal Kishore Dhawal
- Ranjit Kumar Gupta
- Ram Kripal Sinha
- Veena Devi
- Ramgulam Chaudhary
- Jayant Sinha
- Kanhaiya Kumar
- Bali Ram Bhagat
- Ram Lakhan Singh Yadav
- Awadhesh Kumar Rai
- Ram Ratan Singh

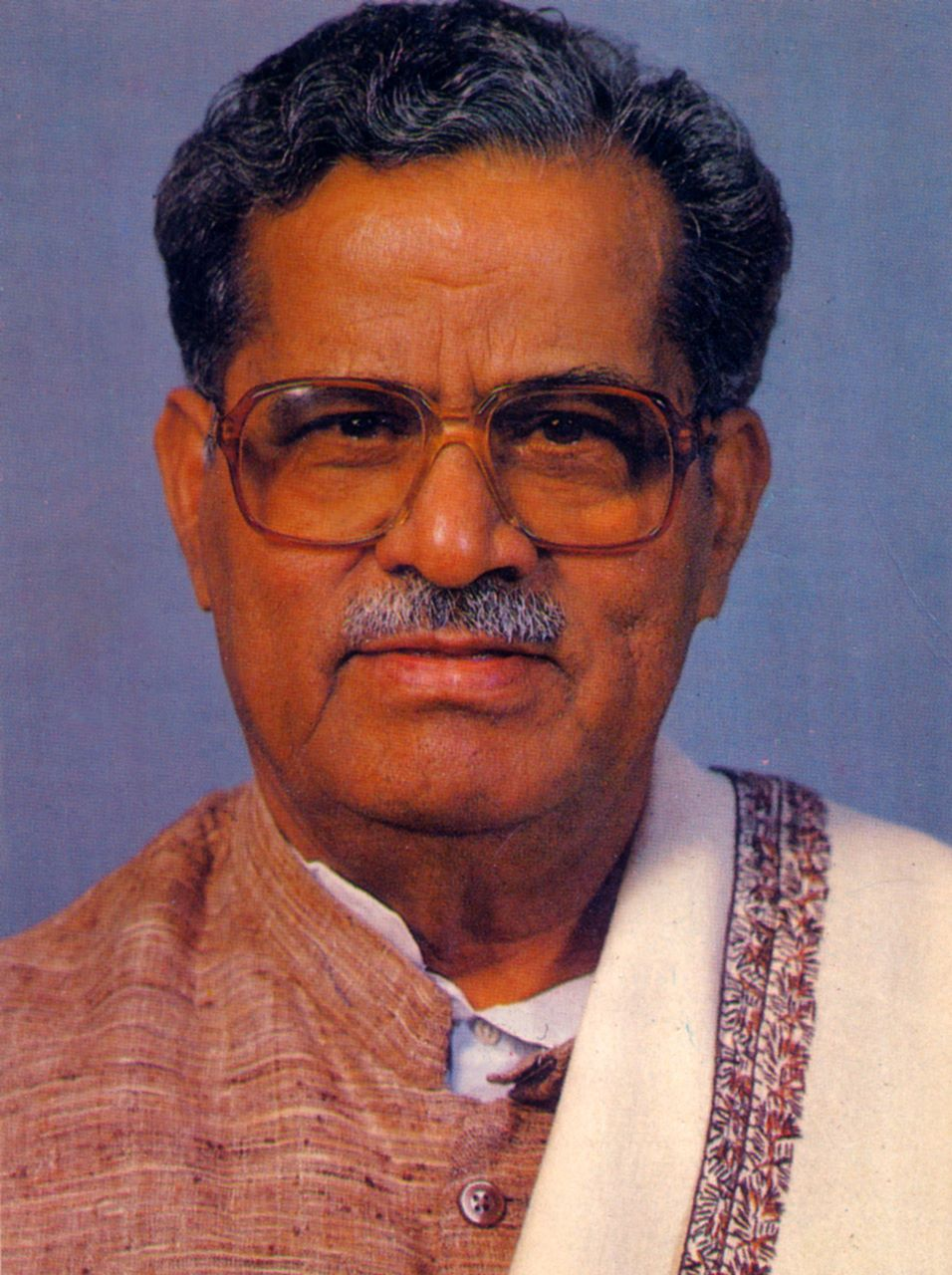
Ram Lakhan Singh Yadav

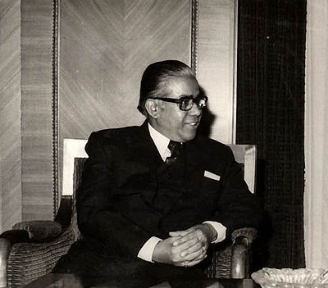
Bali Ram Bhagat

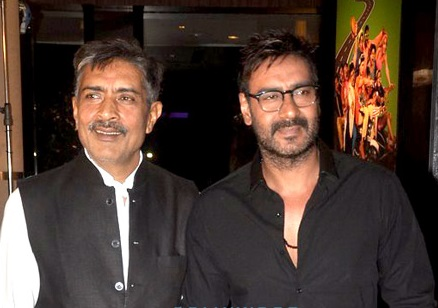
Prakash Jha

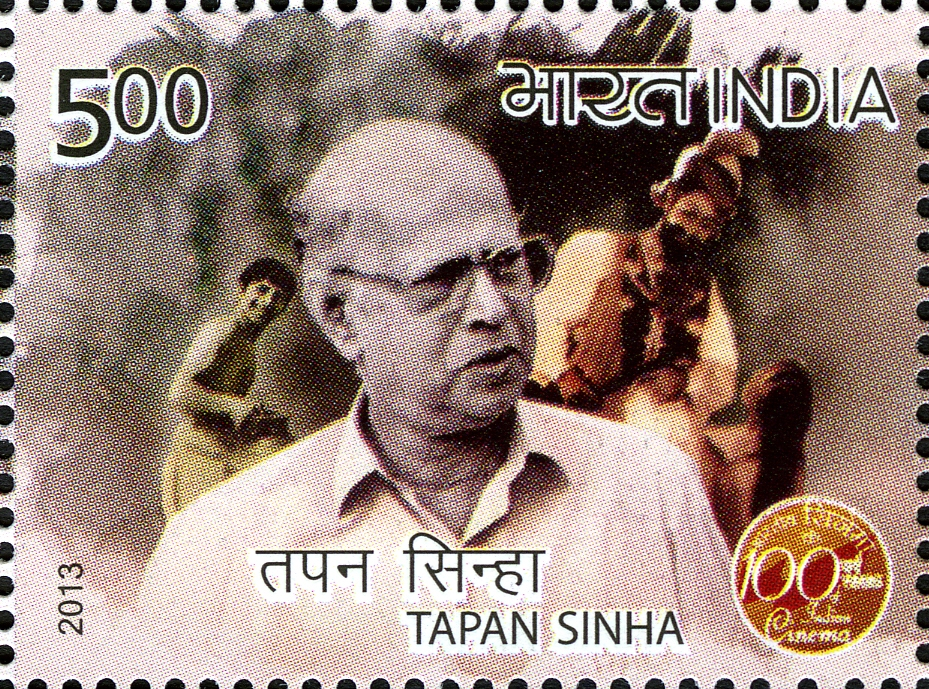
Tapan Sinha

== Entertainment ==
=== Film directors ===
- Ajit Pal Mangat
- Imtiaz Ali
- Kabeer Kaushik
- Manish Jha
- Manish Vatsalya
- Manjul Sinha
- Neeraj Pandey
- Prakash Jha
- Pritish Nandy
- Ram Gopal Bajaj
- Sanjeev K Jha
- Satyen Bose
- Sushil Rajpal
- Tapan Sinha

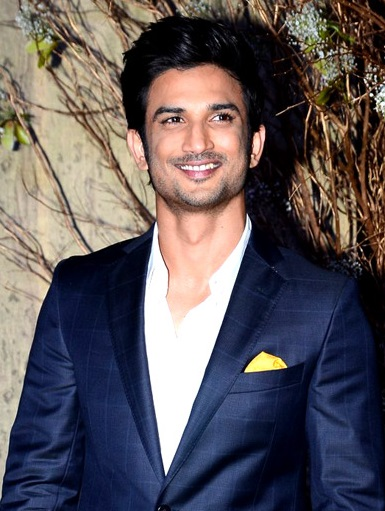
Sushant Singh Rajput

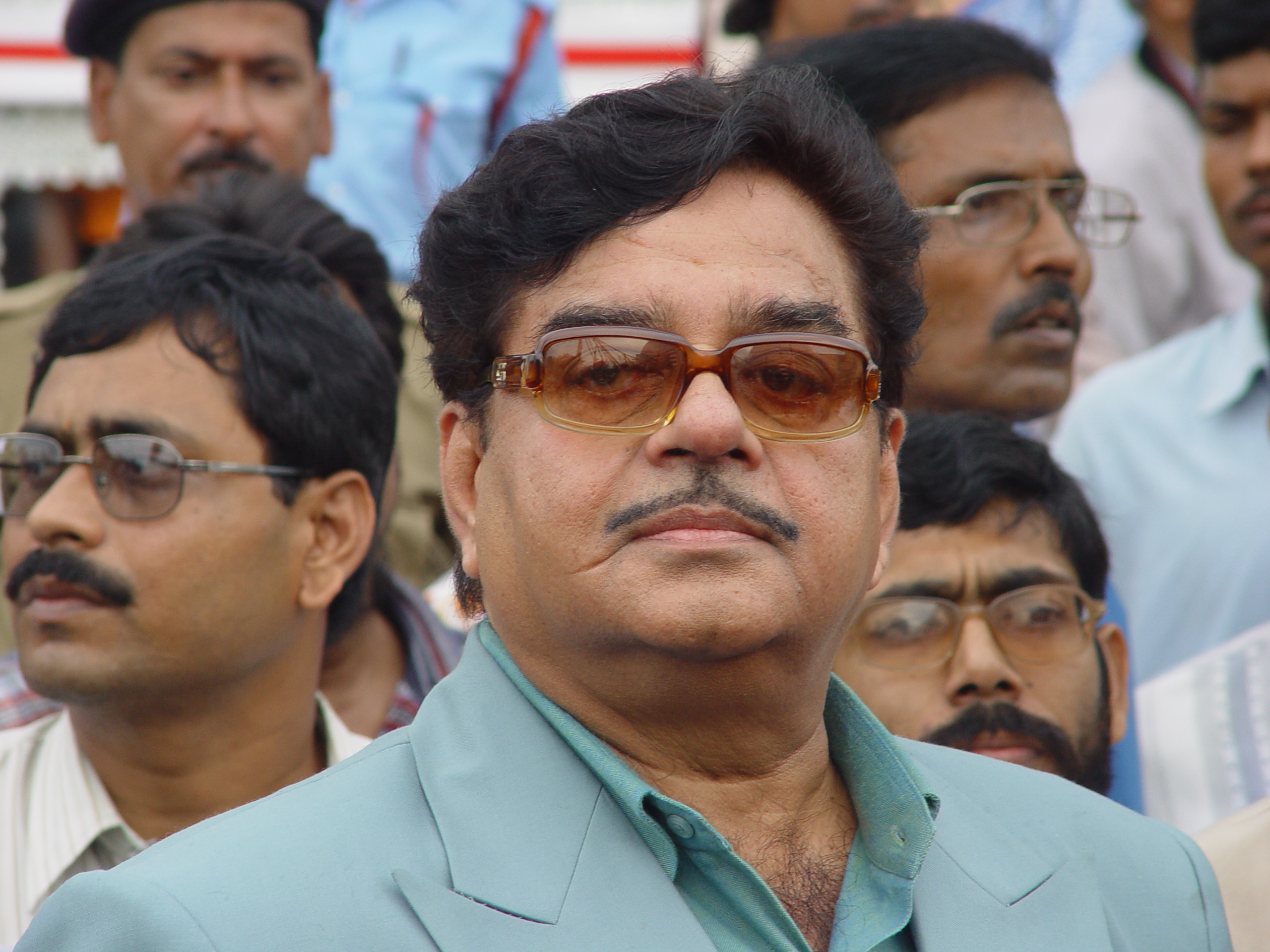
Shatrughan Sinha

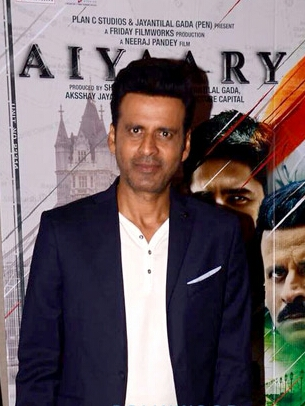
Manoj Bajpayee

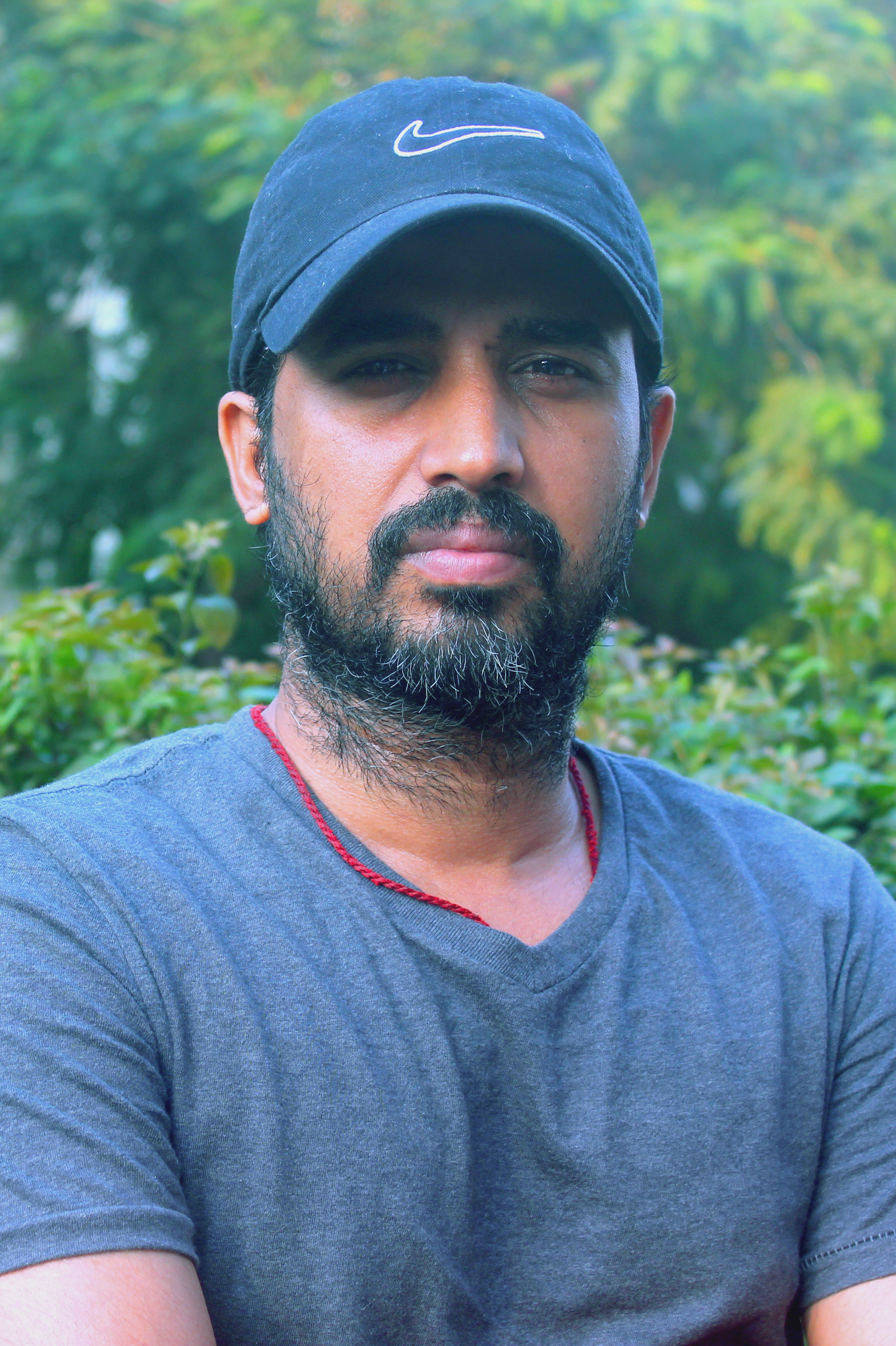
Sanjeev K Jha

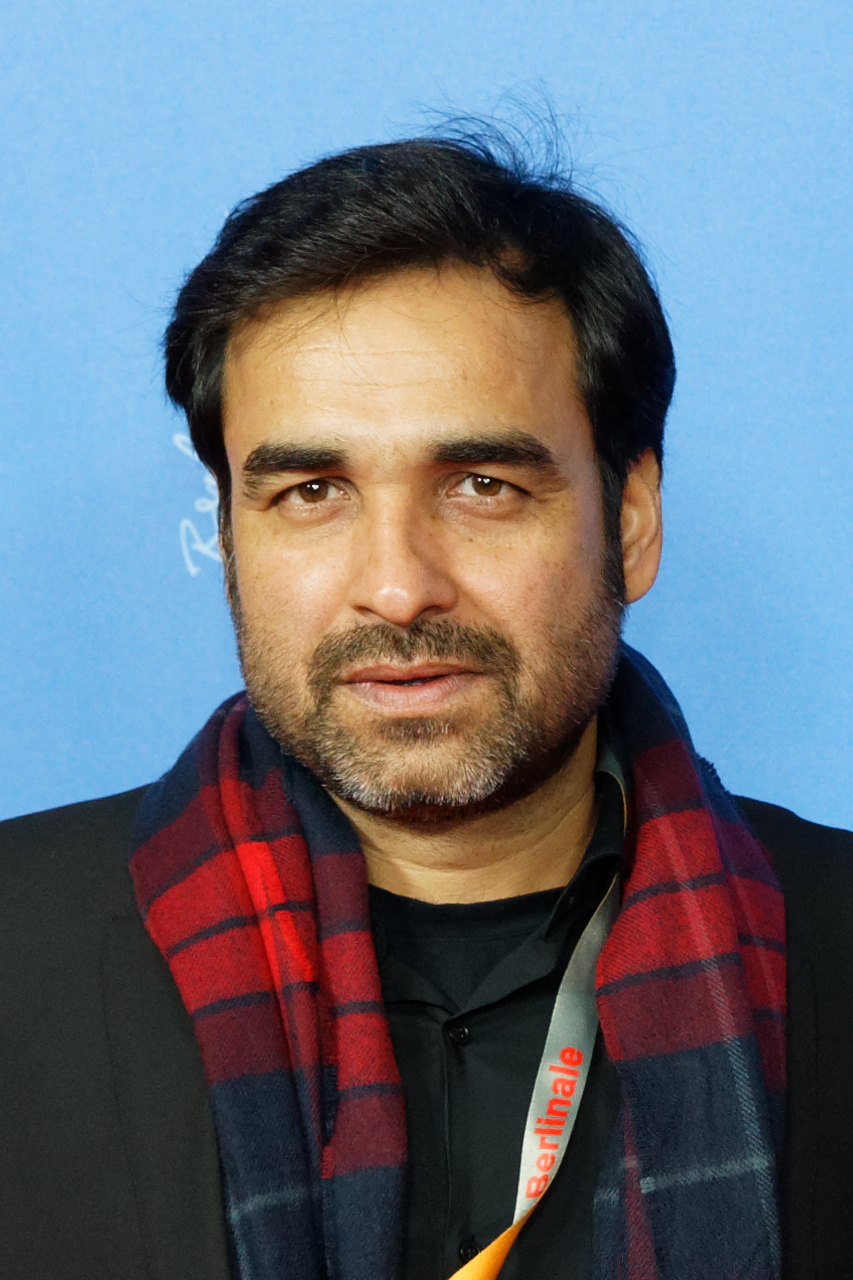
Pankaj Tripathi

=== Actors ===
- Aham Sharma
- Manish Vatsalya
- Sushant Singh Rajput
- Roshan Seth
- Ashok Kumar
- Shatrughan Sinha
- Manoj Bajpai
- Manoj Bhawuk
- Akhilendra Mishra
- Abhimanyu Singh
- Adhyayan Suman
- Luv Sinha
- Pankaj Tripathi
- Shekhar Suman
- Sanjay Mishra
- Vinay Pathak
- Gurmeet Choudhary
- Vineet Kumar
- Narendra jha
- Rajesh Kumar (actor)
- Manoj Tiwari
- Pankaj Jha
- Dinesh Sharma
- R. Madhavan
- Vishal Aditya Singh
- Chandrachur Singh
- Alok Nath
- Khesari Lal Yadav
- Lilliput
- Zeishan Quadri

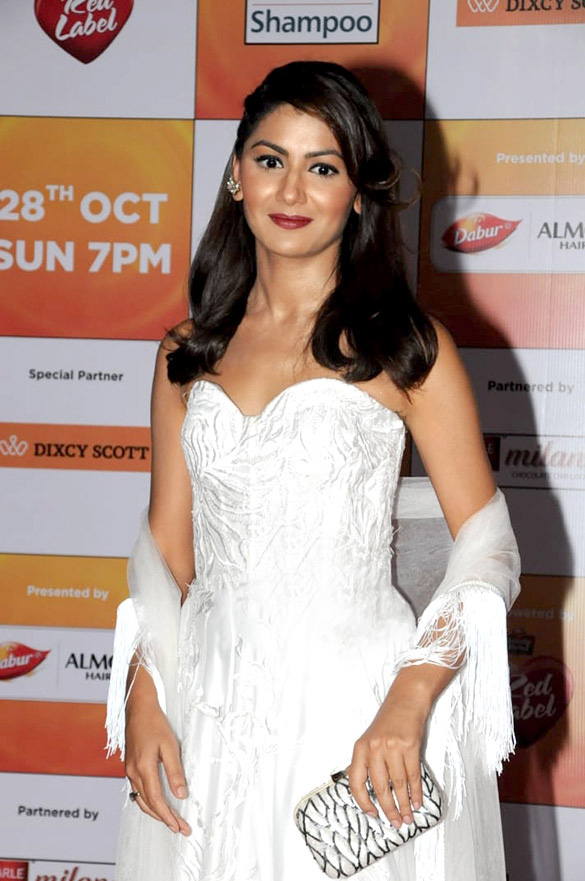
Sriti Jha

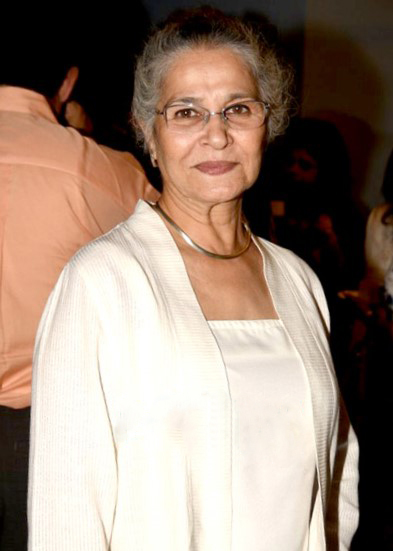
Suhasini Mulay

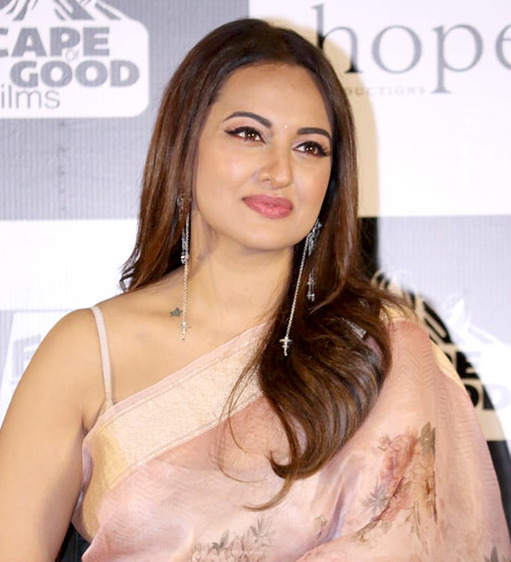
Sonakshi Sinha

=== Actresses ===
- Aisha Sharma
- Pooja Sharma
- Prachi Sinha
- Neha Sharma
- Sandali Sinha
- Shilpa Shukla
- Neetu Chandra
- Swati Sen
- Kaveri Jha
- Neelima Azeem
- Amardeep Jha
- Suhasini Mulay
- Shilpa Singh
- Shreya Narayan
- Anurita Jha
- Rati Pandey
- Ratan Rajput
- Sriti Jha
- Richa Soni
- Ulka Gupta
- Chhavi Pandey
- Shweta Prasad
- Sonakshi Sinha
- Aishwarya Sushmita
- Kumkum

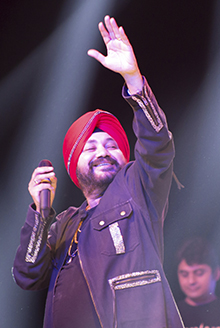
Daler Mehndi

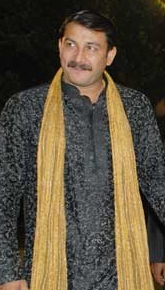
Manoj Tiwari

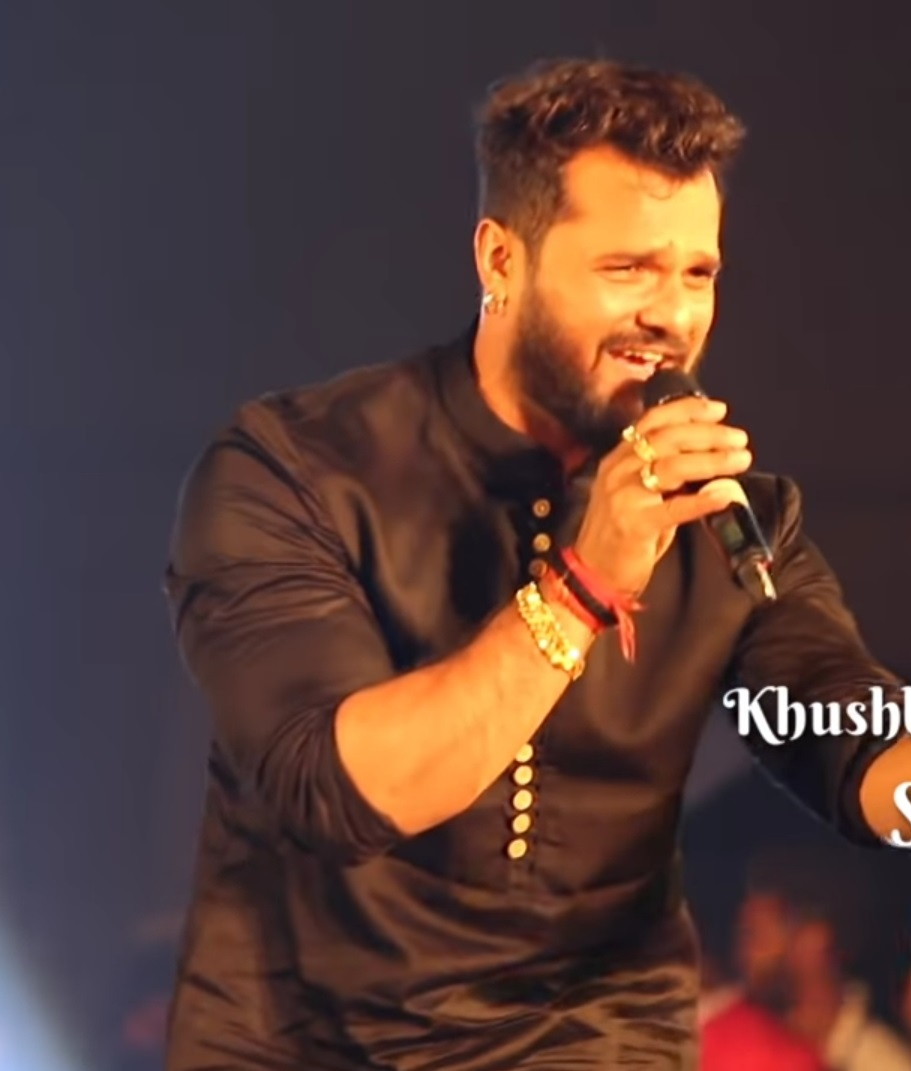
Khesari performing in a stage show

=== Singers ===
- Daler Mehndi
- Kiran Ahluwalia
- Sundar Popo
- Sharda Sinha
- Manoj Tiwari
- Pawan Singh
- Khesari Lal Yadav
- Nilkamal Singh
- Aishwarya Nigam
- Parmanand Singh
- Maithili Thakur
- Ritviz Srivastava (Ritviz)

=== Music directors ===
- Chitragupta
- Anand–Milind
- Bapi Tutul
- Ramashreya Jha
- Norman Hackforth

== Arts ==
- Vidyapati
- Nagarjun
- Ramdhari Singh Dinkar
- Ramesh Chandra Jha
- Bismillah Khan
- Chandan Tiwari
- Bhikhari Thakur
- Jaydeva
- Jyotirishwar Thakur
- Srimanta Sankardeva
- Govindadas
- Acharya Ramlochan Saran
- Baldev Mishra
- Surendra Jha 'Suman'
- Radha Krishna Choudhary
- Jaykant Mishra
- Rajkamal Chaudhary
- Parichay Das
- Gajendra Thakur
- Bindhyabasini Devi

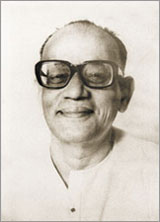
Prabhat Ranjan Sarkar

== Religion ==
- Dharni Das
- Dhyanyogi Madhusudandas
- Dhirendra Brahmachari
- Prabhat Ranjan Sarkar
- Sahadeo Tiwari
- Sa'id Akhtar Rizvi
- Shams-ul-haq Azeemabadi
- Syed Ali Akhtar Rizvi
- Syed Ibrahim
- Tenzin Priyadarshi
- Fuzail Ahmad Nasiri

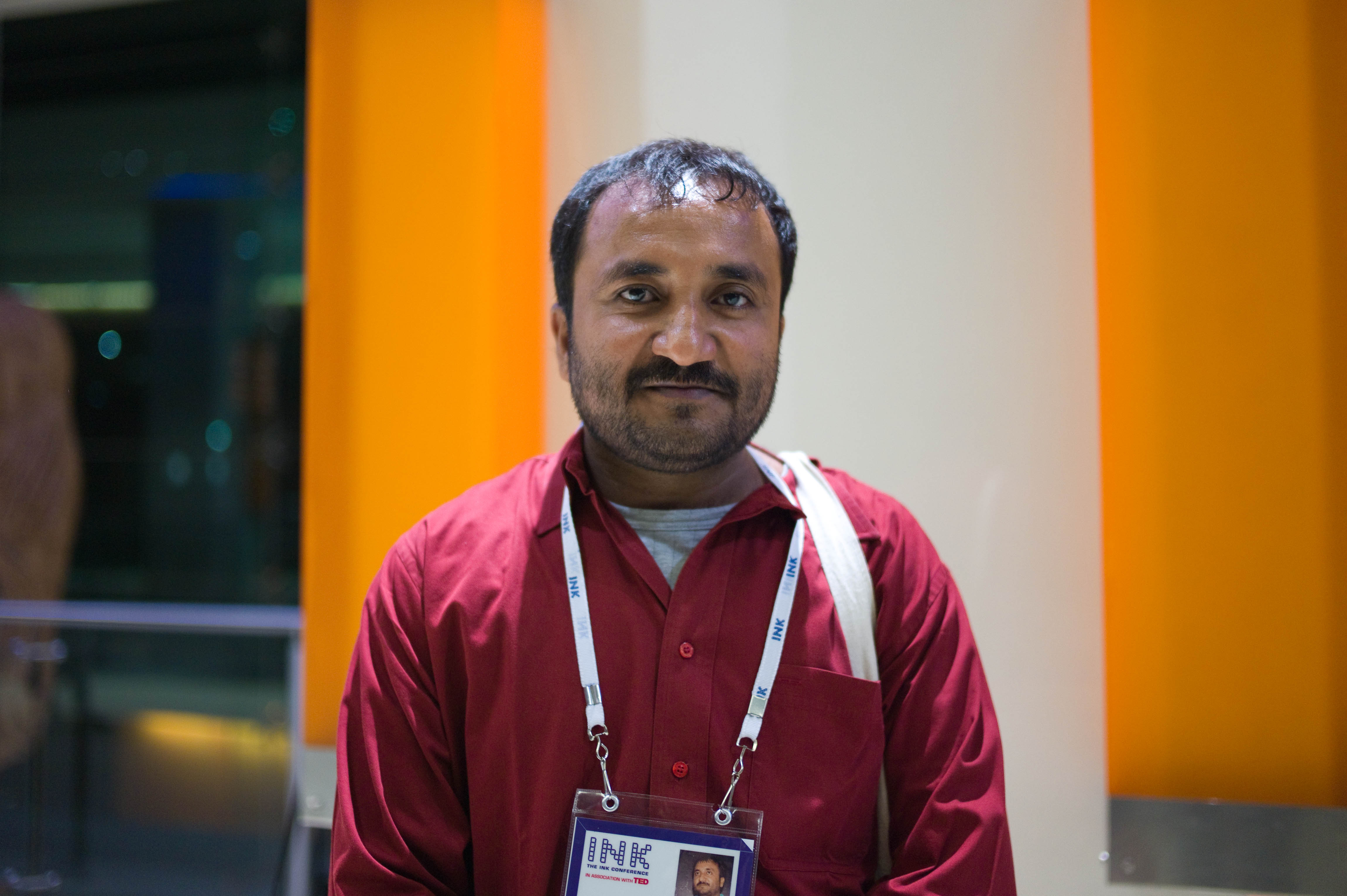
Anand Kumar

== Mathematics and science ==
- Amalendu Krishna
- Anand Kumar
- H. C. Verma
- Rajit Gadh
- Vashishtha Narayan Singh
- Tathagat Avatar Tulsi

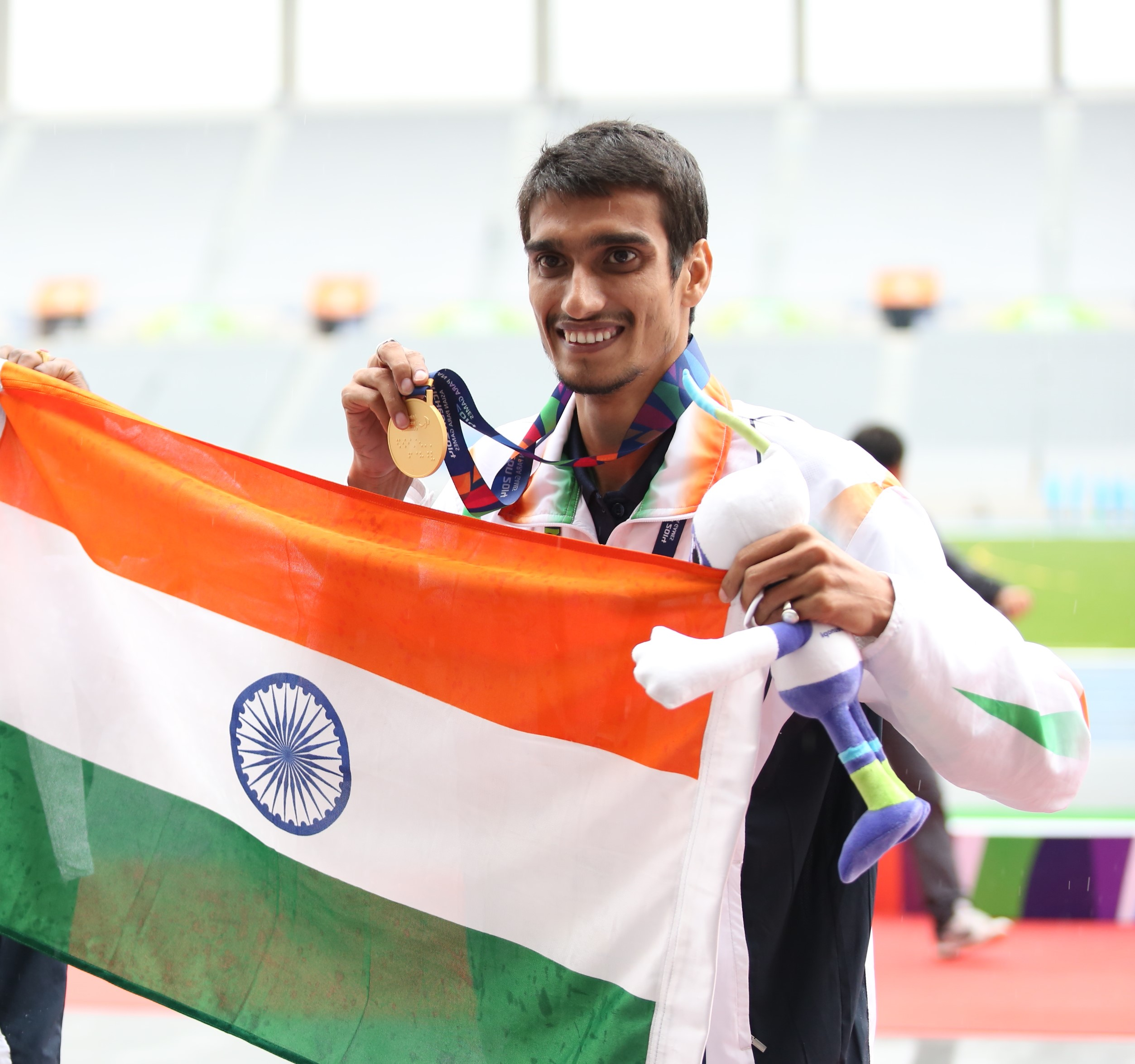
Sharad Kumar

== Doctors ==
- Vinay Kumar (psychiatrist)

== Sports ==
- Saba Karim
- Kirti Azad
- Kaiser Rehan - Taekwondo Player
- Subroto Banerjee
- Shivnath Singh
- Thomas Jameson
- Zafar Iqbal
- Rashmi Kumari
- Rajesh Chauhan
- Kavita Roy
- Veer Pratap Singh
- Ishan Kishan
- Deepika Kumari
- Purnima Mahato
- Randhir Singh
- Premlata Agarwal
- Sanjay Balmuchu
- Aruna Mishra
- Jaipal Singh
- Sharad Kumar
- Pramod Bhagat
- Soman Rana

== Bureaucracy ==
Bureaucracy
Service	Notable Figures
Indian Civil Service	L.P. Singh; Sir Sultan Ahmed; Harnandan Prasad
Indian Administrative Service	Amir Subhani; Balmiki Prasad Singh; N. K. Singh; Pankaj Rag; R. K. Singh; U. K. Sinha; Upamanyu Chatterjee; Yashwant Sinha Yashwant Sinha
Indian Foreign Service	Aftab Seth
Indian Police Service	Abhayanand; J. K. Sinha; Chandan Kushwaha; Lipi Singh; Nikhil Kumar; Acharya Kishore Kunal; Randhir Prasad Verma; Quaiser Khalid; Amitabh Thakur; Ranjit Sinha; Anil Sinha; Javeed Ahmad

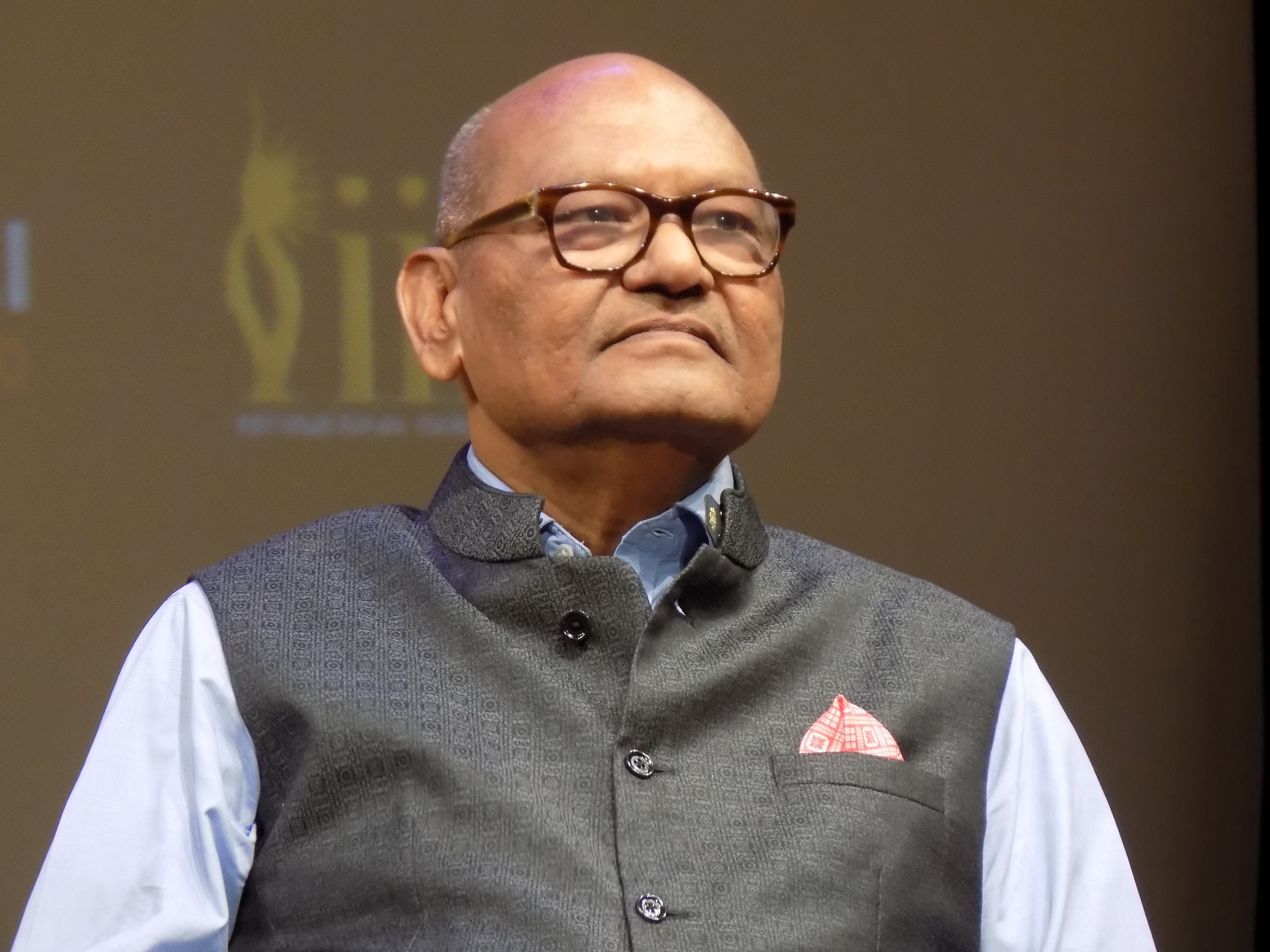
Anil Agarwal (industrialist)

== Business ==
- Anil Agarwal, founder and executive chairman of Vedanta Group
- Arunabh Kumar, CEO of TVF
- Ravindra Kishore Sinha, founder of Security Intelligence Service
- Sanjay Jha
- Subrata Roy, founder of Sahara Group
- Samprada Singh
- Satyapal Chandra, founder and CEO of MagTapp
- Mahendra Prasad, Aristo Pharmaceuticals founder

== Others ==
- Anand Kumar
- Anil Kumar
- Dashrath Manjhi
- Ganesh Dutt
- Gurusharan Sharma
- Khan Sir
- Malati Choudhury
- Maṇḍana Miśra
- Martha Dodray
- Mona Das
- Mukesh Hissariya
- Natwarlal
- Nirupama Pandey
- Pranati Rai Prakash
- Shaibal Gupta
- Shilpa Singh
- Shyamanand Jalan
- Subhav Sinha
- Sudhir Kumar Chaudhary
- Supriya Aiman
