= Jubba Sahni =

Indian freedom-fighter and revolutionary (1906–1944)

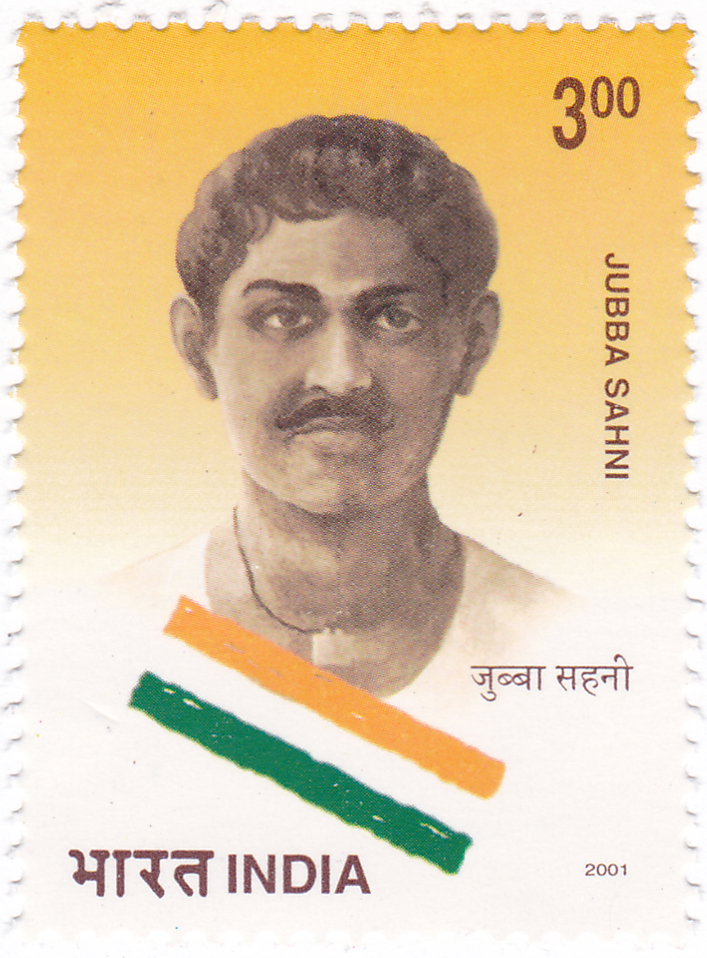
- Jubba Sahni on a 2001 stamp of India
- Born: 1906; Chainpur Basti, Muzaffarpur, Bengal Presidency, British India (now Bihar, India)
- Died: 11 March 1944 (aged 37–38); Bhagalpur Central Jail, British India (now Bihar, India)
- Cause of death: Execution by hanging
- Occupations: Freedom fighter; revolutionary
- Known for: Contribution to the freedom struggle
- Movement: Indian independence movement Quit India Movement

Jubba Sahni (1906–1944) was an Indian freedom fighter and revolutionary. He was executed by hanging on 11 March 1944 at the age of 38. He is remembered as the bravest revolutionary in Bihar.

== Early life ==
He was born in 1906 into a poor Mallah family in the village of Chainpur Basti, under Minapur police station, Muzaffarpur district, Bengal Presidency, British India. His father's name was Pachu Sahni.

== Revolutionary activities ==
On the call of Gandhiji, he participated in the Salt Satyagraha Movement, protest at liquor shops, campaigned in every village for not paying Chowkidari tax to the government, taking part in demonstrations to ban the import of foreign clothes and supported the Harijan Uddhaar Aandolan. During this time he had to go to jail in the years 1932, 1934 and 1942.

In December 1932, while picketing against drug abuse at a liquor shop near Saraiyaganj Marwari Dharamshala in Muzaffarpur, Jubba was injured by the British police and three bones of his left rib were broken.

From the Salt Movement of 1930 to the British Quit India Movement of 1942, their revolutionary steps continued to grow. In August 1942, under his leadership, the movement of setting fire to government offices, post offices, police stations and hoisting the tricolour on them continued.

On 16 August 1942, he led an armed revolt against the Police Station in Minapur in which the in-charge of the Police Station, Waller was killed. Sahni took the entire responsibility for the episode upon himself and was later sentenced to death by a special court appointed by the British Government. He was hanged to death in Bhagalpur Central Jail, at the age of 38.

== Legacy ==
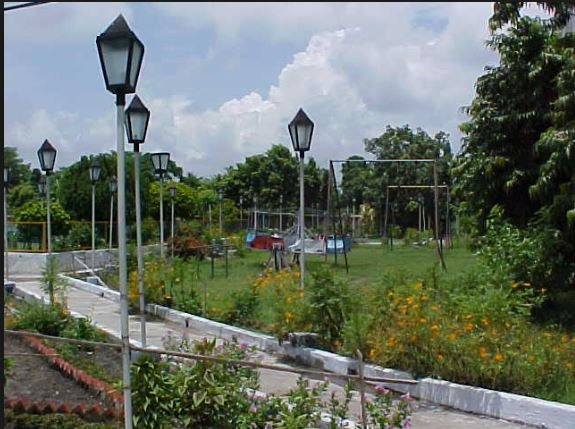
Jubba Sahni Park, Ramna, Muzaffarpur

A park and a railway station in Muzaffarpur were named Jubba Sahni Park and Jubba Sahni station as a tribute to him. In the jail where he was hanged by the British govt, later named after him. Now, it is called Jubba Sahni Central Jail Bhagalpur. Additionally, his name is also associated with the Barela Salim Ali-Jubba Sahni Bird Sanctuary, located in Vaishali district and established in 1997.

In March 2023, a park was inaugurated in Patna featuring a life-size statue of Jubba Sahni, unveiled by Chief Minister Nitish Kumar in tribute to his contribution to the freedom movement.

== See also ==
- Indian independence movement
- List of people from Bihar
- Muzaffarpur
