= Satyapal Chandra =

Indian author and entrepreneur

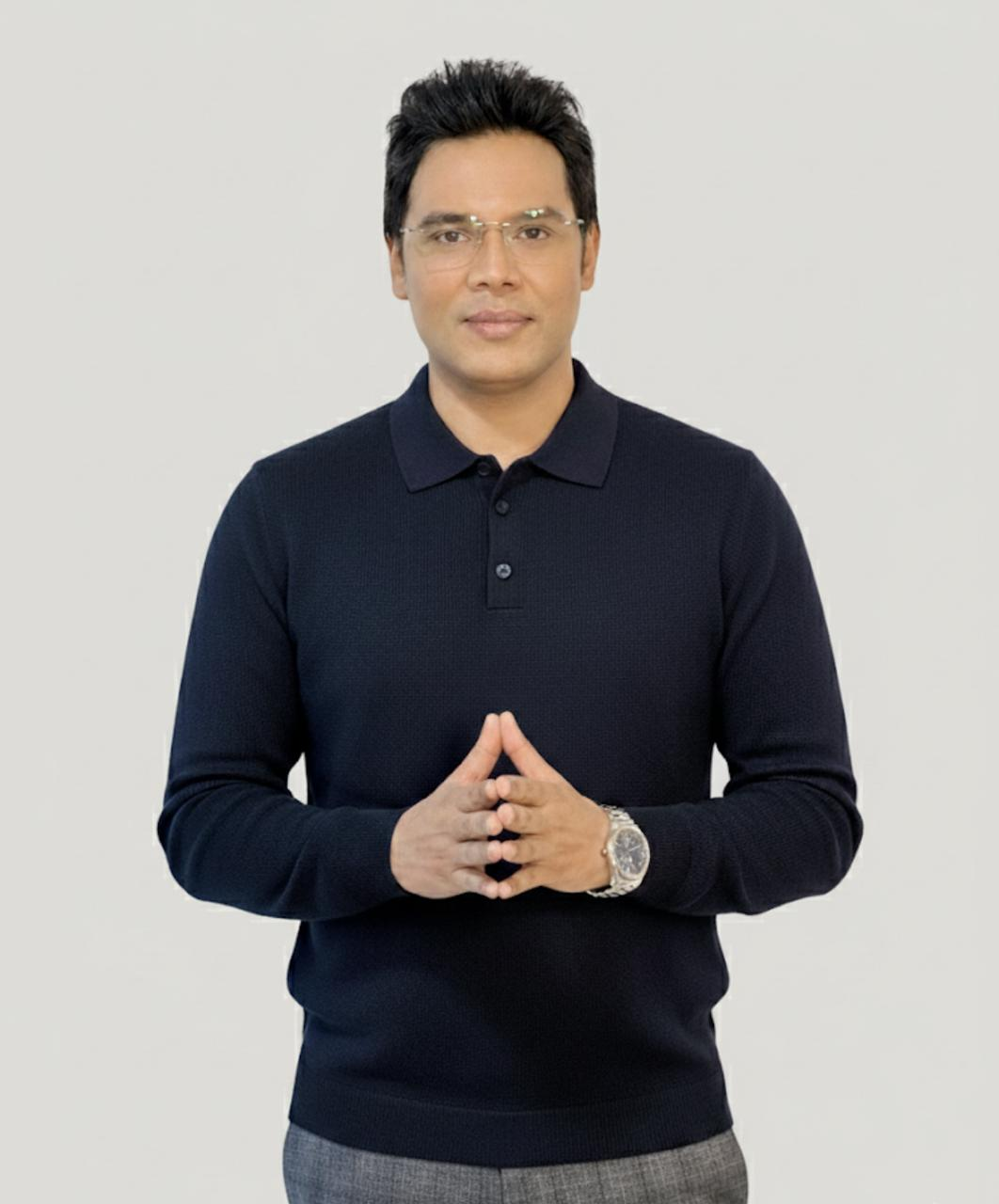
- Born: 1987 or 1988 (age 37–38); Malhari, Gaya, Bihar, India
- Education: Anugrah Memorial College; School of Open Learning; Delhi University
- Occupations: Author, Entrepreneur, Screenwriter
- Years active: 2011
- Title: Founder & CEO of MagTapp
- Website: Official website

Satyapal Chandra (born 1987 or 1988) is an Indian author and entrepreneur. He is founder of MagTapp Technologies. He has penned novels of various genres.

== Early life and education ==
He hails from a remote village, Malhari, situated in the Gaya district of Bihar. He belongs to a very small farmer family. He had a very rough childhood facing various kinds of problems like poverty and different form of violence. He has finished his primary education from S S High School, a government school situated in Pandeypura, Chatra, Jharkhand. He has finished his higher secondary education from Anugrah Memorial College Gaya, Bihar. He has finished his education in Hindi Medium till higher secondary. His academic accomplishments included various accolades and awards.

== Writing career ==
His first novel The Most Eligible Bachelor published in 2011 by Mahaveer publishers. The book is about Communalism, youth struggle and entrepreneurship. Subsequently, the same year his second book Golden Angel and the Darkness Of Midnight published in the Diamond Books. This book is a mysterious fiction based on the friendship between an angel and a human and he has plans to finish it in various parts. In year 2012, he has published six novels. An Innocent Traitor is a crime fiction based on Mafia life and reality of India and Dreams Revenge And Confession is an adult fiction based on illicit relationship. Both novels have been published by Pigeon Books India. My Life Is For You is a romantic fiction, Women's Desire is fiction based on various issues of modern life and For Your Beautiful Dreams is again a romantic fiction which all have been published by Diamond Books. A Crazy Careless Life, a fiction based on abject social reality and communal violence is published by Mahaveer Publishers. In 2013, he has published his next book After All You Are My Destiny, a romantic fiction based on a coincidental journey of two strangers. The book has been published by Diamond books. His tenth book When Heaven Falls Down is published by Mahaveer Publishers.

== Books ==
1. The Most Eligible Bachelor-2011
2. Golden Angel and the Darkness Of Midnight-2011
3. An Innocent Traitor-2012
4. Dreams Revenge And Confession-2012
5. My Life Is For You-2012
6. A Crazy Careless Life-2012
7. Women's Desire-2012
8. For Your Beautiful Dreams-2012
9. After All You Are My Destiny-2013
10. When Heaven Falls Down-2015
11. A Promise Among The Dark Winds-2022

== Controversy ==
The release of his tenth novel When Heaven Falls Down, a romantic novel which has enough contents based on communal conflagration, rape by religious leaders, love-jihad, reality of Indian health care system, Medical negligence, Prostitution and corruption in Indian education system caused immediate controversy. It was alleged that content of this book is full of harsh languages showing the naked reality of India where Hindus and Muslims still keep arguing and fighting against each others to prove whose religion is better. He responded by saying that he didn't want to project any generalization towards the whole religion through it. The only motto behind writing this book was to promote communal harmony in society by diminishing social hatred.

== Other works ==
He has worked on various creative projects executing different roles like Lyricists, screenwriter and Creative Director. As a motivational speaker, he has attended many seminars organised by different colleges and NGOs. He is honorary member of many human right organizations. He has produced a web series named Women's Desire. He has widely written articles on many subjects for various websites. He also serves as a co-founder of Brilliance Cosmocare and Brilliance Clinic.

== See also ==
- List of Indian writers
