= Ramgulam Chaudhary =

Indian politician

Ramgulam Chaudhary (1902–1969) was an Indian politician. He was born in the Bengal Presidency, participated in the movement for the independence of India as a member of the Congress Party and was admired by Mahatma Gandhi. He went to jail various times for participating in the freedom struggle. Vice president of the All India Depressed Class League, he participated in the historic Simla Conference and rejected the idea of creating a third state for depressed classes. This helped prevent division of the country into three parts, instead of two.
