= Mukesh Hissariya =

Blood donation activists of Bihar

- मुकेश हिसारिया
- Born: February 12, 1972 (age 54); Jhumri Telaiya, Jharkhand
- Citizenship: Indian
- Occupations: Health Activist & Social Worker
- Known for: Blood Donation Activism

Mukesh Hissariya (born 12 February 1972 ) is an Indian blood donation activist and social worker. Also known as the 'Blood Donation Man of Bihar', he has provided bloods to more than seventy thousand people in Bihar. During the COVID-19 pandemic, he arranged the funerals of 375 people who lost their lives and no relatives were present to perform the last rites. He runs a blood donation centre named 'Maa Blood Centre' in Patna.

== Early life ==
He is originally from Jhumri Telaiya, Koderma district of Jharkhand, earlier it was part of Bihar. Now, he is based in Patna. In early days, he used to sell Ayurvedic medicines.

== Work ==
Hissariya started voluntarily donating blood and blood donation activism in 1991, when his mother faced a blood shortage. During his volunteering blood donation at Patna Medical College Hospital, he found out about the children suffering from thalassemia where patient child required blood in every 15 days. To fulfill the requirements of blood for thalassemia patient, he started blood donation awareness camp and persuade people to donate blood. Later in 2006, he established an NGO, named 'Maa Vaishno Devi Seva Samiti' and his aim was to address the critical blood shortage in public hospitals.

During COVID-19, his NGO was instrumental in providing blood in all critical illness. He also helped and completed the last rites of around 375 dead people whose relatives were not been turned out due to fear of Corona virus spread.

He presented the requirements of bone marrow transplant of children to then CM Nitish Kumar in 2013. He has been regular in samvad session of Bihar govt and raised issues related to public health.

In 2022, he started a blood centre 'Maa Blood Centre' in patna. CM Nitish Kumar has inaugurated the centre. He also started a virtual blood bank and formulating a network of ten thousand volunteer.

== Recognition and honours ==
Dettol has recognised his work and given him 'Our Protector Award'. His photo gets space on Dettol pouches and bottles as a 'CoVID-19 Protector' with acknowledgement of his efforts.
