= Kalanath Mishra =

Kalanath Mishra (born 19 December 1959) is a Hindi author. His writing spans several genres of Hindi literature, including kavita (poetry), kahani (story), laghukatha (novelettes), samiksha (reviews), and reports.

== Biography ==
Mishra completed his M.A. in Hindi from Patna University. He later received his MBA from L. N. Mishra Institute of Economic Development & Social Change (Patna). He started his career with the Patliputra Times, a daily Hindi newspaper of Bihar. He has been awarded degree of Ph.D. from Patna University, Patna, on the topic : (Sahityakaron ke Jivan par adhrit Hindi Upanyason me jivani ke tatwa evam aupanyasik Kalpana). In 1990, Mishra left his job, and joined as a lecturer of Hindi at Magadh University.

Currently, Mishra is pursuing his writing along with his job. He is working in the field of education, culture, literature and journalism. His articles are being published in various literary magazines.

== Publications ==
- Hindi Upanyas me Sahityakaron ka charitra vidhan
- Hindi Upanyas me Sanskrit rachanakaron ka Jivan vrit
- Jivan Chhand (kavita Sangrah)
- Aawara Masiha: Ek Oupanyasik Jivani
- Mera Jivan Swet Shyam (kavita Sangrah)
- Do Kamare Ka Man (Kahani Sankalan)

== Translations ==
Some Eminent Behar Contemporaries by Dr. Sachidanand Sinha.

== Certificates of honour ==
- Visisht Rachnakar Samman By 'NAI DHARA' Founded by eminent litterateur Raja Radhika Raman Pd. Singh, Suryapura House, Boring Road, Patna- 800 001.
- Acharya Ramchandra Shukla Samman, By Sahityakar Sansad, Bihar.
