= Martha Dodray =

Indian health worker

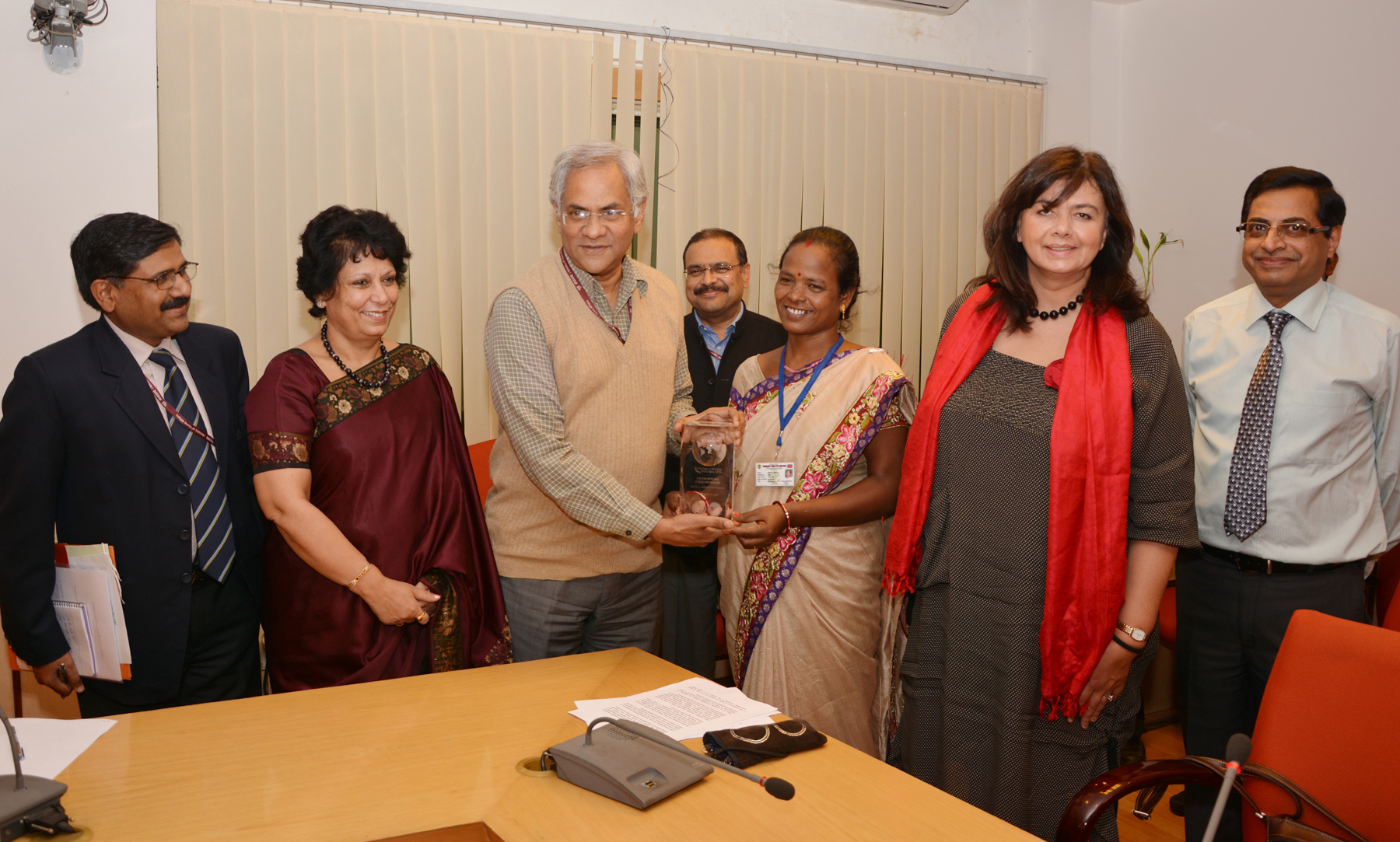
Martha Dodray, third from right, receives her UN Global Leadership Award in New Delhi on November 08, 2013, with other dignitaries.

Martha Dodray is a front-line polio worker from Indian state of Bihar. In 2013, she was awarded a United Nations Foundation award for her work in protecting children from polio. She was invited to the Global Leadershiptoards Dinner of 2013 hosted by the UN Foundation. Subsequently, in 2014 she was selected for the National Florence Nightingale Award in 2014.
