= Gurusharan Sharma =

Judge of the Jharkhand High Court (born 1942)

Gurusharan Sharma (born 15 January 1942) is a retired judge of Jharkhand High Court, Ranchi, India.

== Early life ==
He was born in Pandarak in the Indian state of Bihar and hid father was late Giriwardari Sharma. He completed his schooling in 1956 from Punyark Vidya Mandir, Pandarak, and obtained a post-graduation degree in political science in 1963 from Patna University, Patna, and completed his Bachelor of Law from the same university in 1965.

== Professional life ==
On 23 August 1966, he was enrolled as an advocate in the Bar Council of Bihar, and commenced his practice of law in Patna High Court, Patna. On 19 October 1992, he was appointed as a judge of Patna High Court and on 15 November 2000 as a judge of Jharkhand High Court.
