= Bhikhari Thakur bibliography =

Indian poet and playwright

Bhikhari Thakur (1887–1971) was an Indian Bhojpuri-Language poet and playwright. He wrote more than a dozen plays and also poems and some other works.

== List of works ==
Works by Bhikhari Thakur
Type	Year	Bhojpuri title	English title	Other names
Play		Biraha Bahar		
Play	1917	Bidesiya	The Foreigner	Kaljug Bahar; Baharā Bahar
Play		Radheshyam Bahar		
Play	1925	Beti Bechwa	The Daughter Seller	Beti Bilap; Beti Biyog
Play		Kaljug Prem	The love of Kali Yuga	Piyawā Nasaïl
Play		Gabarghichor	Gabarghichor	Ghichor Bahar
Play		Bhai Birodh	Brother's protest	
Play		Ganga Asnan	Ganges Bath	Shree Ganga snan
Play		Putra Badh	Son's assassination	
Non-Fiction		Naai Bahar		
Play		Nanad-Bhaujai Sambad	Dialogue of Sister in law	
Monologue		Bhand ke nakal	Copy of bhand	
Play		Nabin Biraha	New Biraha	
Non-Fiction		Shanka Samadhan	Doubt solution	
Poetry		Bhikhari Harikirtan	Bhikhari's Hari Kirtan	
Play		Jasoda Sakhi Sambad	Dialogue of Jashoda and her friend	
Non-fiction		Chaujugi	The four Yuga	
Non-fiction		Jai Hind Khabar	Jai Hindi news	
Non-fiction		Bhikhari Pustika Suchi	List of booklets of Bhikhari	
Non-fiction		Chaubaran Padvi	Title of four Varnas	
Play		Bidhwa Bilaap	Plight of the Widow	
Poetry		Bhikhari Bhajanmala	Bhajans of Bhikhari	
Non-fiction		Budhshala ke Bayan	The demand of Old Age homes	
Poetry		Ram Nam mala		
Non fiction		Sita-Ram Parichay	Introduction to Sita and Rama	
Non fiction		Nar Nav Avatar	Nine Avatars of Men	
Poetry		Ek arti Duniya bha' ke	A player of the world	Arti
Non-fiction		Ram Ratan		
Non-fiction		Mata bhakti	Devotion of the Mother	
Compilations	1978	Bhikhari Thakur Rachnawali (in three vol)		
