= Lavanda Naach =

Bhojpuri Folk dance

Lavanda Nach
- Genre: Folk dance
- Origin: Purvanchal, India

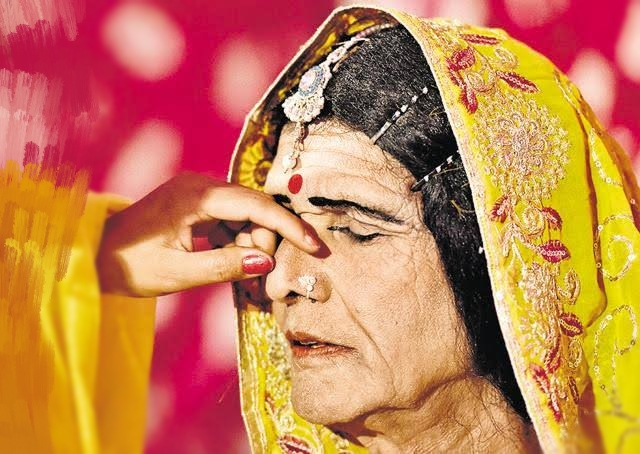
Lavanda dance is performed by males who dress as females called as Lavandas

The Lavanda Nach (Bhojpuri: 𑂪𑂫𑂝𑂹𑂙𑂰 𑂢𑂰𑂒𑂢𑂰𑂒; Lit.: Boy's Dance) is a folk dance of the Bhojpuri speaking Community of India, Nepal, Mauritius and the Caribbean Islands. It is performed by only males who dress as women called "lavanda". During the wedding ceremony lavanda dancers are a focal point, leading the groom's entourage to the bride's home.

== Name ==
The Bhojpuri word launda literally means a young male adolescent. However, in daily life, it is sometimes used as a derogatory term for a man, who is effeminate and from an inferior Caste. Whereas, the term naach translates to dance.

In the Mughal Era, Courtesans had significant importance. From there, the dance of female performers became popular among moneylenders and landlords. The performance used to be called as baiji and the dance was called baiji naach. On the other hand the naach of boys was popular among lower caste, and it is believed that the word launda with naach was used to differentiate it from baiji naach.

== History ==
The earliest mention of this folk dance can be found in 11th century which remained alive in the Bhojpuri region and in 19th century, this idea of transforming the centuries-old art form into a people's theatre was conceptualised by Bhikhari Thakur, who is also for credited for popularising it. In the first few decades of the twentieth century when the world was witnessing revolutionary changes recognising the rights of the downtrodden, Bhikhari Thakur displayed their constant struggle and survival instinct through agrarian theatre that came to be colloquially known as 'Lavanda Naach', comprising "songs, dance, comedy, satire, pun, banter, parody, and theatre where men impersonate women in performances that last all night."

== Tradition, recognition and criticism ==
Ramchandra Manjhi, the last disciple of Thakur, inherited a great legacy and vast repertoire of Naach Theatre such as Bidesiya, Gabarghichor, Beti Bechwa, etc. 93-years-old Manjhi was awarded the Sangeet Natak Academi Award in 2017, coincidentally the centenary year of Bhikhari Thakur's theatre.

However, the Lavanda Naach diversified over time, transcending the boundaries and parameters established by the scions of Thakur's theatre. With the rise of multiple sources of entertainment, the folk art form has also been criticised for losing its 'professionalism', allowing objectification and validating it, and becoming an area for abuse. Although the professional groups engaged in Lavanda Naach have been criticised for restricting the participation of women, one reason behind this is prevalence of human trafficking in the case of 'lewd dance troupes', called Aarkestra, which are gaining traction in the region where once Lavanda Naach was well received. This rapid change has been pushing the performances of the Lavanda Naach ensembles to be adjusted according to the mainstream audience demands.

== Notable performers ==
- Bhikhari Thakur
- Khesari Lal Yadav
- Ramchandra Manjhi

== Bibliography ==
- Dost, Jainendera (2017). "Naach, Launda Naach or Bidesiya Politics of (re)naming". Performance Research. 22 (5): 106–112. doi:10.1080/13528165.2017.1384187. S2CID 158697968.
