= Manoranjan Prasad Sinha =

Bhojpuri Poet

- Born: 10 October 1900; Shahabad, Bengal Presidency, British India
- Died: November 1971 (aged 71); Ranchi, Bihar (present-day Jharkhand), India
- Occupations: Poet, Professor
- Parent: Rajeshwar Prasad (Father)
- Writing career
- Language: Bhojpuri, Hindi

Manoranjan Prasad Sinha (10 October 1900 – November 1971) was a Bhojpuri poet, author and professor and Principal of Rajendra College, Chapra. He is famous for his Bhojpuri poem Firangia, which he wrote in 1921 during Non-cooperation movement. He was also elected as the president of 18th Bihar Hindi Sammelan at Motihari.

== Life ==
He was born on 10 October 1900 in Shahabad district, his father Rajeshwar Prasad was a Judge. His family later shifted to Dumraon town of the district (presently Buxar) After completing his higher studies he became Reader at Banaras Hindu University. Later he became the Principal of Rajendra College at Chhapra. After retiring from here he became the Chancellor of Hindi Vidyapeeth in Deoghar. He spent his last years of life at an Ashram in Vrindavan. In the month of November in 1971 he died in Ranchi.

== Works ==
=== Bhojpuri ===
- Firangia
- Chausa Ke Maidan Me
- Kitaban Me Ego Duniya Basal Ba
- Kaga Bhore Bhore Bole Hamra Angana

=== Hindi ===
- Uttarakhand Ke Path Par
