= Parichay Das =

Indian writer

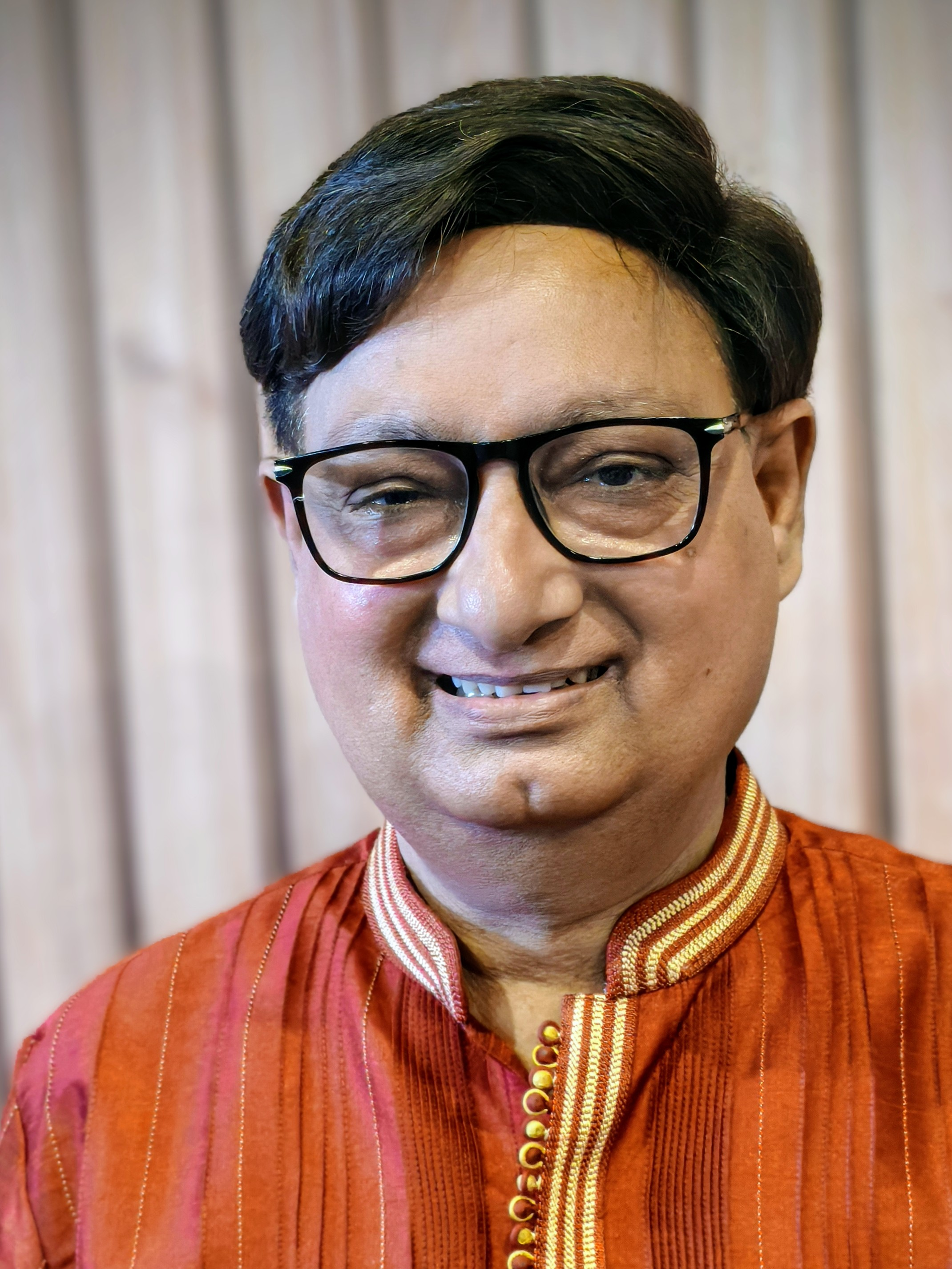
- Parichay Das at Khajuraho Dance Festival 2026
- Born: Ravindra Nath Srivastava; Devlaas in Mau district, Uttar Pradesh, India
- Occupations: writer, editor

Parichay Das (born Ravindra Nath Srivastava), is an Indian writer, essayist, poet and editor of contemporary Bhojpuri poetry. He is Professor and Head, Department of Hindi, Nava Nalanda Mahavihara Deemed University. He writes in Bhojpuri and Hindi. He earned his Ph.D. from Gorakhpur University, Gorakhpur. He is former Secretary, Maithili-Bhojpuri Academy and ex-Secretary, Hindi Academy under Delhi Government. He has written/ edited/ text edited more than 30 books. He received Dwi-Vaageesh Samman award for "Srijan Evam Anuvaad" [Creative Writing and Translation] by the Bhartiya Anuvad Parishad [Translator's Association of India] in 2012. He received Bhojpuri Keerti Sammaan, Bharteey Dalit Sahitya Sammaan, Shyam Narayan Pandey Sammaan, Editor's Choice Award and Damodar Das Chaturvedi Bhasha-Sahitya Sammaan. He delivered a lecture on Bhojpuri in Kathmandu as representative of Kendriy Sahitya Akademi in 2012. He recited his poems in 'SAARC Literary Summit ' in Delhi in 2011. He is considered a unique personal essay writer in Indian Languages and path breaker poet in Bhojpuri.

== Personal life ==
He was born in the village Rampur Devlaas in Mau district, Uttar Pradesh, India. He was secretary, Hindi Academy, Delhi Government and Secretary, Maithili - Bhojpuri Academy of the Government of Delhi. His wife Vandana Srivastava is a welknown and trend setter artist in 'Bhojpuri Painting'. She developed Bhojpuri Painting from tradition to contemporary dimensions.

== Career ==
Das has served as a secretary to Maithili–Bhojpuri Academy and Hindi Academy of the Delhi Government. He has also worked as an editor to the academies' magazines, Parichhan and Indra Prasth Bhaarti.

Edited an important creative literary critical book in Bhojpuri language on Bhikhari Thakur, a well-known actor and playwright in Bhojpuri.

Edited more than 25 cultural packages, including:

- Manipuri Dance
- Kuchipudi Dance
- Musical Instrument of India (2 Volumes)
- Architecture of India
- Textile Designs (2 Volumes)
- Traditional theatre in India

Edited/Text Edited Magazines

- Indraprastha Bharti, a Hindi literary and cultural magazine published by Hindi Academy, Delhi
- Srotasvini, a literary-cultural magazine published by CCRT, Govt of India
- Saamskritiki, a literary-cultural magazine published by CCRT Govt of India
- Pradnya, a socio-cultural, political magazine
- Parichhan, a literary magazine published by Maithili-Bhojpuri Academy, Delhi

Some Discourses and Lectures/ Poetry Recitation -

- Lecture on Globalisation and Literature/ Gorakhpur University [March 2014]
- poetry Recitation / Sahitya Akademy /Delhi [2012]
- Chair, Bhartiya Kavita Utsav / Mathrubhumi foundation/ Delhi [2012]
- Lecture on Indian novels / Kamla Nehru College, Delhi University [2012]

Lecture on Bhojpuri Literature and Language in kathmandu [Sahitya Akademy Representative][ 2012 ]

- Poetry Recitation in SAARC literary festival, Delhi (2011)
- Sahiya aur Samskriti ka Atm Saundarya (September, 2006, Indian Business Academy, Greater Noida)
- Bhoomandalikaran aur samskriti-Sahitya (October, 2007, Indian Business Academy, Greater Noida)
- Bhoomandalikaran, Vishwabandhutva aur Sahitya-Samskriti (December, 2007, Indian Business Academy, Greater Noida)
- Literature and Culture (Kandriya Sachivalay Hindi Samiti)
- 50 other lectures in Delhi

Organising Events and Activities: Cultural Programmes

- Organised above 100 Cultural Activities (literature, art, culture, drama, dance etc.)for Hindi and Maithili-Bhojpuri Academy, Delhi
- Culture and Development
- Hindi : Contemporary Scene

== Bibliography ==
- Chaaruta
- Ek Naya Vinyaas
- Sansad Bhavan ki Chhat Per Khada Ho Ke
- Prithivi Se Ras Le Ke
- Yugpat Sameekaran Me
- Akanksha Se Adhik Satvar
- Dhoosar Kavita
- Kavita Chaturthi
- Lipi-Alipi
- Dheemee aanch me
- Anupasthit dinaank
- swapn, sampark, smriti [ edited book on Dr. Sitakant Mahapatra ]

== See also ==
- List of Indian writers
- List of Indian poets
