= Ganga Asnan =

Bhojpuri play by Bhikhari Thakur

Ganga Asnan is a Bhojpuri play written by Bhikhari Thakur which was published in 1953. The play talks about the ill treatment of elders in the family and pretense of the religion. The plot criticises both the distance between parents and their children in condition where old parents are completely dependent on their children and also of the tantric culture of sadhus who most often are conmen.

== Characters ==
- Malechhu, The protagonist
- Malechhu's wife

== Plot ==
Malechhu's wife becomes ready to go for Ganga Snan with her friends and other women of the village. She also tells her husband Melchhu to go with her. He also wants to take his mother with him, but she refuses in clear terms. After a long dispute, the two reconcile and the three come together. While bathing in the Ganges, his mother slips into the Ganges. Malechhu's wife neither saves her allows him to save his mother. Somehow that old woman comes to the banks of the river and starts mourning for her son. On the other hand, the mother is crowding along the banks of the Ganges and a Brahmin take the wife alone to do worship for getting a son, and loots all her jewels and runs away. Here malechhu's wife curses and cries herself for disobeying her husband and insulting her mother-in-law. She becomes alone at the fair when malechhu finds her, then they together find the mother. The mother is cursing herself for her evil deeds by sitting under a tree. On seeing her mother-in-law, Malechhu's wife falls at his feet and starts apologizing. Finally the trio leave for home together.

== Bibliography ==
- Sah, Sonu (2022). Bhikhari Thakur's Bhojpuri Folk Drama: A Study from Literary Perspectives. Sikkim University.
