= Chitbara Gaon =

- Town
- Nickname: Badka Gaon
- Location in Uttar Pradesh, India Chitbara Gaon (India)
- Coordinates: 25°45′53″N 84°00′27″E
- Country: India
- State: Uttar Pradesh
- District: Ballia

Population (2011)
  - Total: 21,879

Languages
  - Official: Bhojpuri, Hindi
- Time zone: UTC+5:30 (IST)
- Vehicle registration: UP
- Website: up.gov.in

Chitbara Gaon is a town and a nagar panchayat of Ballia district, Uttar Pradesh, India.

== Demographics ==
As of 2011 India census, Chitbara Gaon had a population of 21,879. Males constitute 52% of the population and females 48%. Chitbara Gaon has an average literacy rate of 31%, lower than the national average of 79.9%; with male literacy of 42% and female literacy of 18%. 10% of the population is under 6 years of age.

== Tourism ==
- Baraiya Pokhara, Chitbara Gaon
- Ramshala, Chitbara Gaon
- Shivala, Chitbara Gaon
- Bhawani Sthan, Jawahar Nagar,
- Madari Peer Baba, Railway Station
- Hanuman Tempal Mahrew Road
- Madhav Bramha Baba temple
- Kameshwardham Temple
- Surahi ke Taal.
- Teliya Pokhra . Shiv mandir

 Main market chitbara gaon

== Notable people ==
- Prasiddha Narayan Singh, Bhojpuri Poet and Freedom Fighter
