= Mahendar Misir =

Indian poet and freedom fighter (1886–1946)

- Born: 26 october 1886; Chhapra, Bihar
- Died: 26 October 1946 (aged 81)
- Occupation: Poet
- Writing career
- Notable works: Anguri Me Dasale Biya Naginiya; Hasi Hasi Panawa

Mahendar Misir (16 March 1865 – 26 October 1946) was an Indian Bhojpuri poet who is also called "purbiya samrat" (The Master Of Purbi), freedom fighter. He has written Thousands of Purbi Songs.

== Life ==
Misir was born on 16 March 1865 at Mishrawalia in Chhapra Bihar.

== Works ==
- Mahendra Mangal
- Mahendra Manjari
- Mahendra Binod
- Mahendra Diwakar
- Mahendra Prabhakar
- Mahendra Ratnawali
- Mahendra Kusumawali
- Mahendra Mayank
- Apurva Ramayan
- Bhagwat Dasam Skandh
- Krishna Gitawali
