= The Legacy of Bhikhari Thakur =

Studio album by Kalpana Patowary
- Released: May 14, 2012
- Genre: Folk
- Length: 60:50
- Label: Virgin EMI
- Producers: Music Box Mumbai, Parvez Khan, Kalpana Patowary

"Bhikhari Parichay"
A 1.45-second sample of "The Legacy of Bhikhari Thakur", featuring the albums inspirational description.

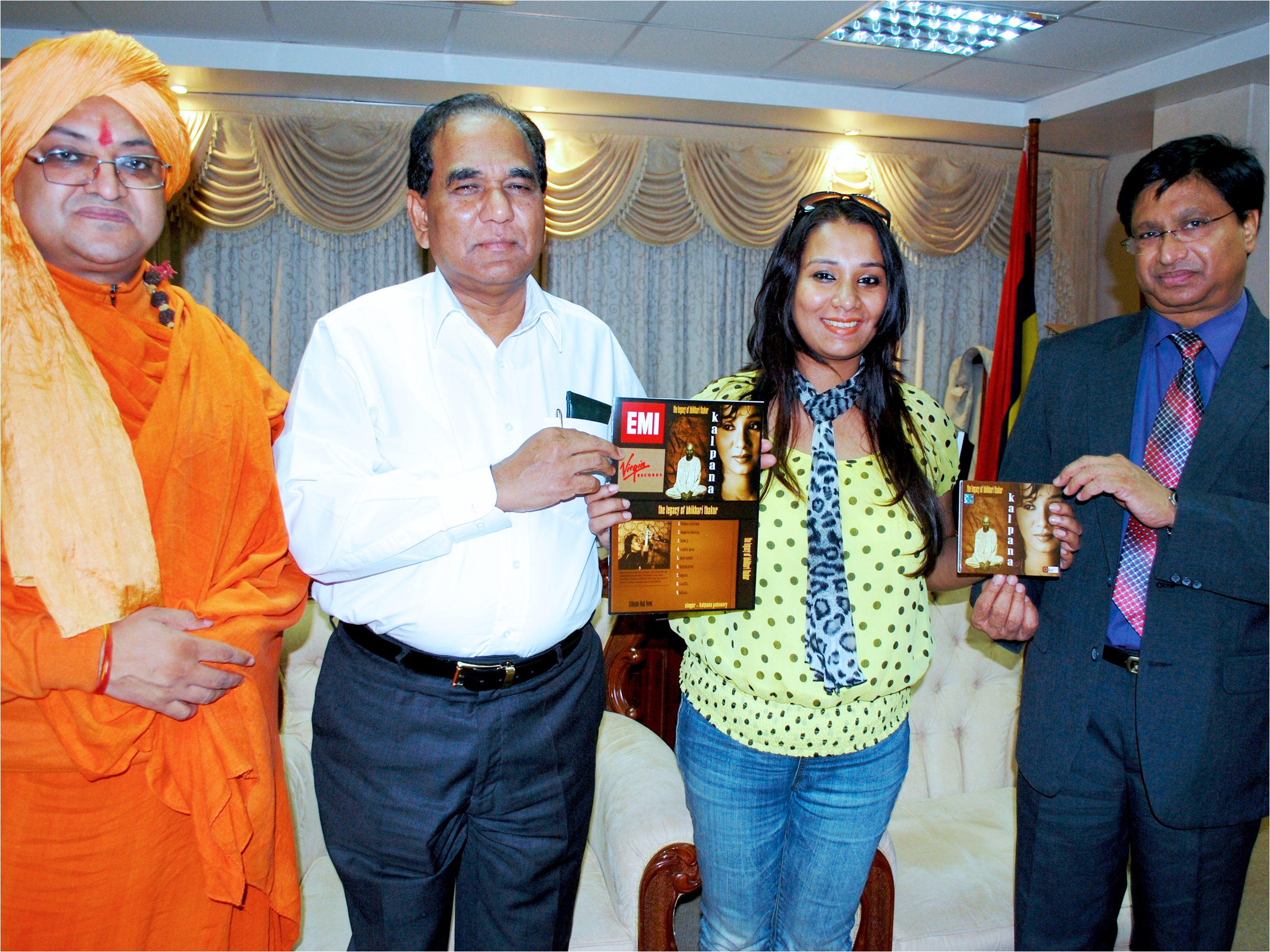
The Legacy of Bhikhari Thakur released by His Excellency, Vice Prime Minister of Mauritius, Anil Bachoo and Arts & Cultural Minister Mr Mookhesswur Choonee in the Prime Minister's office in Mauritius.

The Legacy of Bhikhari Thakur is a Bhojpuri language documentary folk album by Assamese Bhojpuri singer Kalpana Patowary, originally written by Bhikhari Thakur. It was released by London-based music label EMI/Virgin records on 14 May 2012 by the Vice Prime Minister of Mauritius Anil Bachoo and Arts and Cultural Minister Mookhesswur Choonee in the Prime Minister's office in Mauritius.

The album comprises nine tracks, all of which were written by Bhikari Thakur and Kalpana Patowary using minimal acoustics. The album starts with Bhikari parichay, an autobiographical narrative rendered by Kalpana. On the track Kalyug prem, Bhikhari Thakur talks about the anguish of women whose husbands have become addicted to alcohol. The song relates, "Born into a family of barbers, he, like many of his fellow natives, moved to Calcutta for work". Although he later wrote songs questioning the redundant ways and customs of the society, Bhikhari was initially illiterate. "It was a baniya in Calcutta who taught him to read and write," Kalpana said. He then returned to his village and formed the Bhikari Thakur Natak Mandali.

== Track listing ==
No.	Title	Writer(s)	Producer(s)	Length
1.	"Bhikari Parichay"	Bhikhari Thakur	Kalpana Patowary	00:07:01
2.	"Dagaria Johat Na"	Bhikhari Thakur	Kalpana Patowary	00:04:22
3.	"Babu Ji"	Bhikhari Thakur	Kalpana Patowary	00:08:11
4.	"Ramlila Gaan"	Bhikhari Thakur	Kalpana Patowary	00:03:42
5.	"Piyaari Sundari"	Bhikhari Thakur	Kalpana Patowary	00:07:39
6.	"Kalyug Prem"	Bhikhari Thakur	Kalpana Patowary	00:04:42
7.	"Lagania"	Bhikhari Thakur	Kalpana Patowary	00:04:55
8.	"Raas Lila"	Bhikhari Thakur	Kalpana Patowary	00:13:54
9.	"Bidhata"	Bhikhari Thakur	Kalpana Patowary	00:06:24

== Awards ==
The Legacy of Bhikhari Thakur was nominated as Best Folk Album in the non-film music category in GIMA 2013 Global Indian Music Academy awards.
