= Ramchandra Manjhi =

Bhojpuri folk dancer (1925–2022)

- Born: 1925; Tajpur, Chhapra, Bihar and Orissa Province, British India
- Died: 7 September 2022 (aged 97); Patna, Bihar, India
- Occupations: Folk Dancer, Theatre Artist
- Years active: 1935–2022
- Known for: Launda Naach

Ramchandra Manjhi (IAST: Rāmcaṃdra māṃjhī, Bhojpuri: 𑂩𑂰𑂧𑂒𑂢𑂹६ 𑂧𑂰𑂖𑂹𑂕𑂲; 1925 – 7 September 2022) was an Indian Bhojpuri folk dancer and theatre artist who is famous as a Launda Naach performer. He was one of the members of Bhikhari Thakur's drama team and was awarded the Sangeet Natak Akademi Award in 2017 and was awarded India's fourth highest civilian award the Padma Shri in 2021.

== Biography ==
Manjhi was born in Tajpur in the Saran district of Bihar in 1925 in a Dalit family. At the age of 10, he joined the drama team of Bhikhari Thakur and until his demise (1971) he worked with him. He was the oldest member of the Drama team. In his life he performed before many big names like Suraiya, Waheeda Rehman, Meena Kumari, Helen etc. In 2017, he won the Sangeet Natak Academy award, however his felicitation happened in 2019 by the President of India. In January 2021, he was awarded the Padma Shri award in the field of Arts. He died on 7 September 2022 at IGIMS, Patna at the age of 97 due to heart related disease.

== Filmography ==
- He worked in 72 minutes long Documentary film on Launda Naach named "Naach Bhikhari Naach".

== Awards and recognition ==
- Sangeet Natak Akademi Award (2017)
- Padma Shri (2021)
