= Bhojpuri numerals =

Bhojpuri number words include numerals and other words derived from them, along with the words which are borrowed from other numbers.

== Cardinal numbers ==
=== Base numbers ===
Bhojpuri numeral	Arabic numeral	Bhojpuri word	Romanized word
०	0	𑂮𑂳𑂢𑂹𑂢𑂰	sunnā
१	1	𑂉𑂍	eka
२	2	𑂠𑂴	dū
३	3	𑂞𑂲𑂢	tīna
४	4	𑂒𑂰𑂩	cāra
५	5	𑂣𑂰𑂒	pāca
६	6	𑂓𑂫	chava
७	7	𑂮𑂰𑂞	sāta
८	8	𑂄𑂘	āṭha
९	9	𑂢𑂫	nava

=== 1-99 ===
	+0	+1	+2	+3	+4	+5	+6	+7	+8	+9
+0	sunnā	ek	dū/dūi	tīna	cāra	pāṅch	chava/Chay	sāta	āṭha	nava
+10	das	egāraha	bāra'	tera'	caüda'	panra'	sora'	satra'	aṭhāra'	ūnaïs
+20	bīs	ekaïs	bāīs	teīs	caübīs	pachīs	chhabbīs	sattāīs	aṭṭhāīs	ūntīs
+30	tīs	ekatīs	battīs	teṅtīs	chaüṅtīs	païṅtīs	chattīs	saiṅtīs	aṅṛtīs	uncālīs
+40	chālīs	ektālīs	beyālīs	teṅtālīs	chaüwālīs	paiṅtālīs	chhiyālīs	saiṅtālīs	aṅṛtālīs	ūnchās
+50	pachās	ekāwan,	bāwan	tirepan	chaüwan	pachpan	chappan	santāwan	anṭhāwan	ūnsaṭh
+60	sāṭh	eksaṭh	bāsaṭh	tiresaṭh	chaüṅsaṭh	paiṅsaṭh	chāchaṭh	saṛsaṭh	anṛsaṭh	ūnhattar
+70	sattar	ek'hattar	bahattar	tihattar	chaühattar	pach'hattar	chhihattar	sat'hattar	aṭhhattar	ūnāsī
+80	assī	ekāsī,	berāsī	tirāsī	chaürāsī	pachāsī	chiyāsī	satāsi	aṭhāsī	nawāsī
+90	nabbe	ekānbe	bānbe,	tirānbe	chaürānbe	panchānbe	chhiānbe	santābe	anṭhānbe	ninānbe

The Old Bhojpuri word for Twenty is kor̤ī, which is still used in Trinidadian Bhojpuri. In Western Standard Bhojpuri, egara, baara end with "e" instead of "a', hence, egare, baare, tere e.t.c are used till eighteen. The word for Hundred in Bhojpuri is Sai.

=== Higher numbers ===
The word for thousand is Hajār, which is a Persian loanword, the Old Bhojpuri word is Sahas. The word for One Hundred Thousand is Lākh.

1000	Hajār
100,000	Lākh
10000000	karor

Numbers above Hundred are formed by subjoining the lower number with the higher ones.

101	Ek Sai Ek
102	Ek Sai Du
103	Ek Sai Teen
110	Ek Sai Das
1396	Ek Hajar Teen Sai Panchanbe
305256	Tee Lakh Paanch Hajar Chhappan

=== Base 20 counting ===
A counting system considering 20 as a base is also used in Bhojpuri. Hence, 65 is expressed as (3*20)+5, i.e. Teen Bees/Kori aa Panch, Some time number lesser than 20 but near twenty are also expressed in terms of twenty. For example, Eightneen can be expresses has Du Kam Bees/Kori.

== Ordinals ==
First four ordinals are:

1st	pahil
2nd	dūsar
3rd	tīsar
4th	caüth

The rest of the ordinals are made by adding -wā to the cardinals, for ex. pachwā (fifth).

== Multiplicative numerals ==
Multiplicatives are formed are adding hālī, hālā, ber, beri, tor, torī with the numbers.
