= Bhojpuri Wikipedia =

Bhojpuri-language edition of Wikipedia

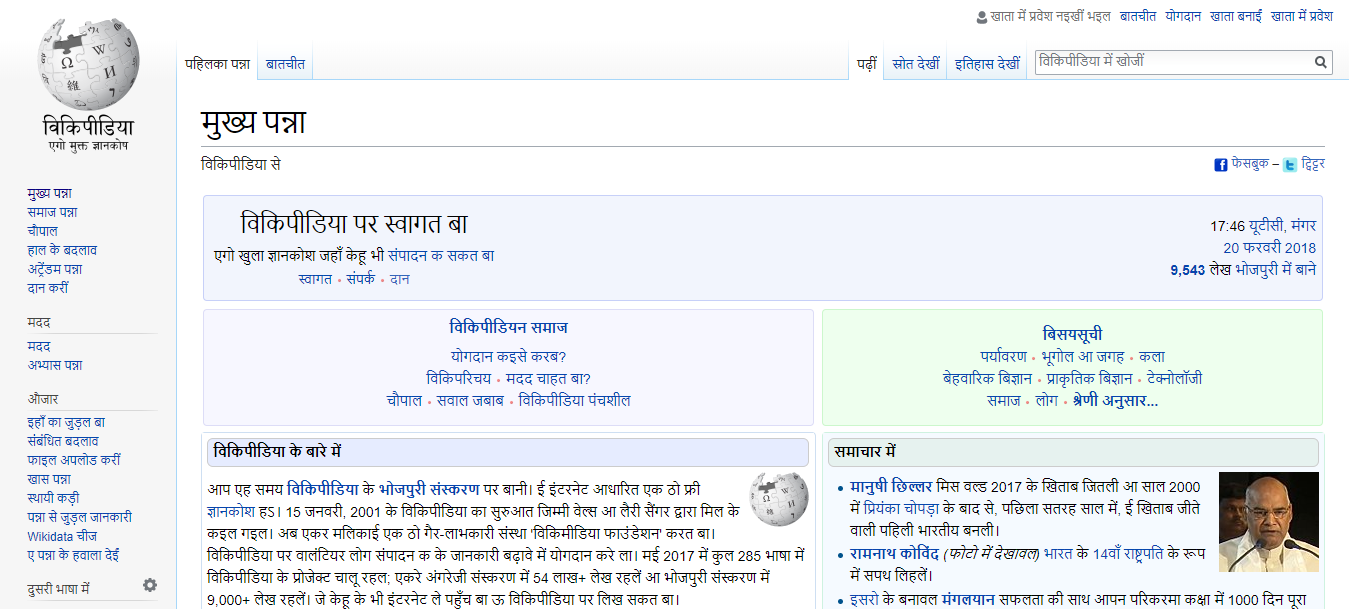
- Screenshot
- Website type: Internet encyclopedia
- Available in: Bhojpuri
- Owner: Wikimedia Foundation
- Website: bh.wikipedia.org
- Commercial: No
- Registration: Optional
- Users: 40708
- Launched: 21 February 2003; 23 years ago
- Content license: Creative Commons Attribution/ Share-Alike 4.0 (most text also dual-licensed under GFDL); Media licensing varies

The Bhojpuri Wikipedia (Bhojpuri: भोजपुरी विकिपीडिया) is the Bhojpuri language version of Wikipedia, run by the Wikimedia Foundation. The site was launched on 21 February 2003. Bhojpuri is today written in the Devanagari script. Bhojpuri is an Indo-Aryan language spoken in northern-eastern India and the Terai region of Nepal. It is chiefly spoken in western Bihar and eastern Uttar Pradesh. The language is a minority language in Fiji, Guyana, Mauritius, South Africa, Suriname, and Trinidad and Tobago.

== Users and editors ==
Bhojpuri Wikipedia statistics
Number of user accounts	Number of articles	Number of files	Number of administrators
40708	9215	54	2
