= Kaljug Prem =

Bhojpuri play by Bhikhari Thakur

- Written by: Bhikhari Thakur
- Original language: Bhojpuri
- Subject: Alcoholism, Domestic Violence

Kaljug Prem (lit.: The love of Kali Yuga) or Piyawa Nasail (transl. en – transl. Drunkard Husband) is a Bhojpuri play written by Bhikhari Thakur. These plays are about a woman (and her son) who is troubled by his husband's habit of intoxication. In this play, the issue of alcoholism and domestic violence has been highlighted.

== Plot ==
The protagonist of the story is a woman named Dukhaharin, whose husband Nasaïl is a drunkard who have sell everything of house for drinking. There is nothing at home, he comes every day after drinking and beats his wife and younger son. The elder son Sankar was driven to Calcutta due to his father's alcohol addiction. The wife is most sad when her husband goes to a prostitute, one day she approaches that prostitute with her son and begs him to leave her husband. Finally, her elder son returns from Calcutta after five years earning a lot of money, and keeps his mother and younger brother happy.

== Characters ==
- Nasaïl : A Drunkard
- Dukhaharin : Nasail's wife
- Larika :- Dukhaharin's younger son
- Sankar : Dukhaharin's elder son
- Randi : A prostitute

== Bibliography ==
- Sah, Sonu (2022). Bhikhari Thakur's Bhojpuri Folk Drama: A Study from Literary Perspectives. Sikkim University.
