= Chhapra =

City in Bihar, India

Chhapra Chaparā
- City
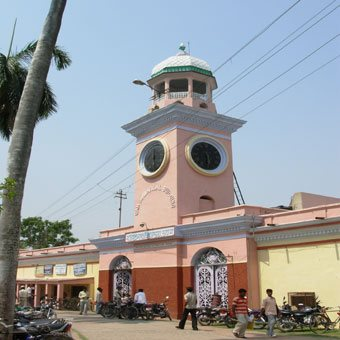
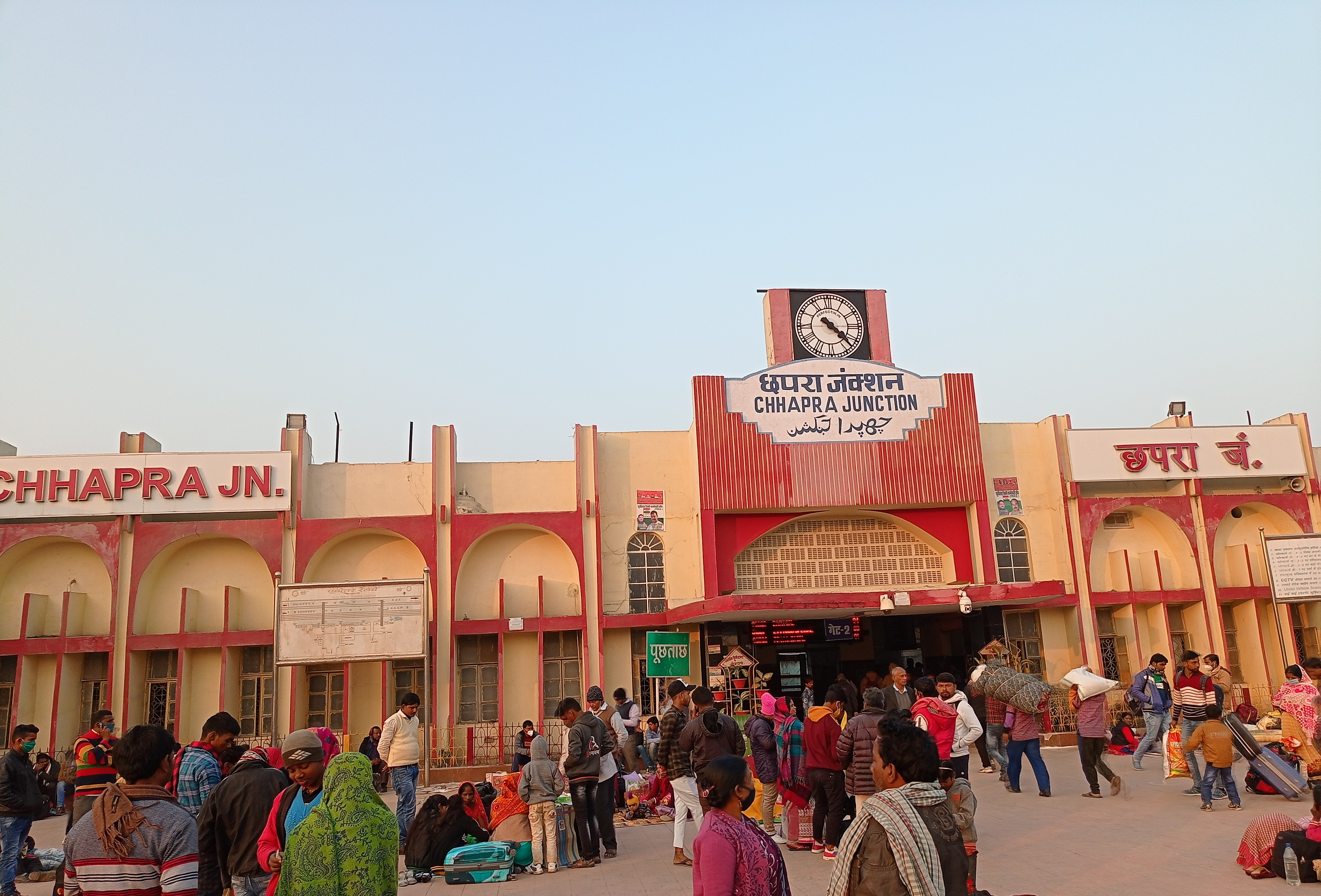
- Rajendra College, Chapra
- Interactive map of Chhapra
- Coordinates: 25.7848°N 84.7274°E
- Country: India
- State: Bihar
- Region: Bhojpur
- Division: Saran
- District: Saran
- Ward: 45

Government
  - Type: Mayor–Council
  - Body: Chhapra Municipal Corporation
  - Mayor: Laxmi Narayan Gupta
  - Deputy Mayor: Ragini Devi
- Elevation: 36 m (118 ft)

Population (2011)
  - City: 201,597
  - Urban: 212,955
- Demonym: Chaprahiya

Language
  - Official: Hindi
  - Additional official: Urdu
  - Regional: Bhojpuri
- Time zone: UTC+5:30 (IST)
- Pincode(s): 84120X
- Area Code(s): +91-(0)6152
- Vehicle registration: BR-04
- Sex ratio (2011): 1015(females per 1000 males) ♂/♀
- Literacy (2011): 81.30%
- Lok Sabha constituencies: Saran
- Vidhan Sabha constituencies: Chapra (118)
- Avg. annual temperature: 26 °C (79 °F)
- Avg. summer temperature: 32 °C (90 °F)
- Avg. winter temperature: 20 °C (68 °F)
- Website: saran.bih.nic.in chapra.biharurban.in

Chhapra (ISO 15919: Chaparā) is a city and the administrative headquarters of Saran district in the Indian state of Bihar, India. It also serves as the headquarters of the Saran division. The city is situated near the confluence of the Ghaghara River and the Ganges River in the north-western part of Bihar.

== Overview ==
Chhapra grew in importance as a river-based market in the 18th century, when the Dutch, along with the French, Portuguese, and English, established saltpeter refineries in the area. The town was officially recognised as a municipality in 1864. Chirand, located near Chhapra in the Saran district, is an important archaeological site on the northern bank of the Ganga River. It preserves evidence of continuous human occupation from the Neolithic period (c. 2500 BCE) through the Chalcolithic and later historical phases. Excavations at Chirand have revealed early agriculture, bone tools, pottery, and settlement patterns significant to the study of the middle Ganga plains. Chhapra is situated at the confluence(sangam) of two holy rivers, Ganga and Sarayu (also known as ghaghara).

== Geography ==
Chhapra is located in Saran district in the Indian state of Bihar. The city lies at about 25.78°N latitude and 84.72°E longitude, with an average elevation of around 36 metres (118 ft) above sea level. It is situated near the confluence of the Ganges and Ghaghara rivers.

Patna, the capital of Bihar, is located about 70 km east of Chhapra. The region is part of the Indo-Gangetic Plain and has fertile alluvial soil, which makes the surrounding land suitable for agriculture. Major crops grown in the area include sugarcane, maize, and paddy.

== Climate ==
Climate data for Chhapra
Month	Jan	Feb	Mar	Apr	May	Jun	Jul	Aug	Sep	Oct	Nov	Dec	Year
Mean daily maximum °C (°F)	23.1 (73.6)	25.8 (78.4)	31.0 (87.8)	35.1 (95.2)	35.0 (95.0)	34.9 (94.8)	32.5 (90.5)	32.8 (91.0)	32.5 (90.5)	31.6 (88.9)	29.0 (84.2)	24.8 (76.6)	30.7 (87.2)
Mean daily minimum °C (°F)	9.2 (48.6)	11.0 (51.8)	15.1 (59.2)	19.1 (66.4)	21.2 (70.2)	22.9 (73.2)	23.8 (74.8)	24.2 (75.6)	23.8 (74.8)	21.2 (70.2)	15.8 (60.4)	10.6 (51.1)	18.2 (64.7)
Average precipitation mm (inches)	13.0 (0.51)	14.0 (0.55)	9.0 (0.35)	29.0 (1.14)	76.0 (2.99)	139.0 (5.47)	353.0 (13.90)	254.0 (10.00)	193.0 (7.60)	73.0 (2.87)	6.0 (0.24)	7.0 (0.28)	1,166 (45.9)
Source: Accuweather

== Demographics ==
According to the 2011 Census of India, Chhapra had a population of 202,352, comprising 106,501 males and 95,851 females. The city had a sex ratio of 900 females per 1,000 males. Children aged 0–6 years numbered 29,100.

The literacy rate of Chhapra was 78.47%, with male literacy at 84.16% and female literacy at 72.14%.

=== Religion ===
Hinduism is the majority religion in Chhapra, followed by about 81.45% of the population. Islam is the second-largest religion with around 18.11% of the population. Other religions include Christianity, Jainism, Sikhism, and Buddhism in smaller proportions.

Religion in Chhapra city (2011)
Religion	Per cent
Hinduism	81.45%
Islam	18.11%
Others	0.44%

== Transport ==
Chhapra is connected to other cities in Bihar and nearby states by rail and road. The main railway station is Chhapra Junction railway station, which links the city to Patna, Varanasi, Gorakhpur, Delhi, and Kolkata.

- Roads connect Chhapra to neighbouring districts and cities like Patna, Siwan, Gopalganj, and Muzaffarpur. Local transport includes buses, auto-rickshaws, cycle rickshaws, and taxis.
- The city has the Under Construction Double Decker Flyover, built to reduce traffic congestion. It has two levels, which help vehicles move faster along busy roads.
- The nearest airport is Jay Prakash Narayan International Airport in Patna, about 70 km away. A new greenfield airport at Sonpur is also planned, which will improve air travel for Chhapra and the surrounding areas once it is completed.

== Notable people ==
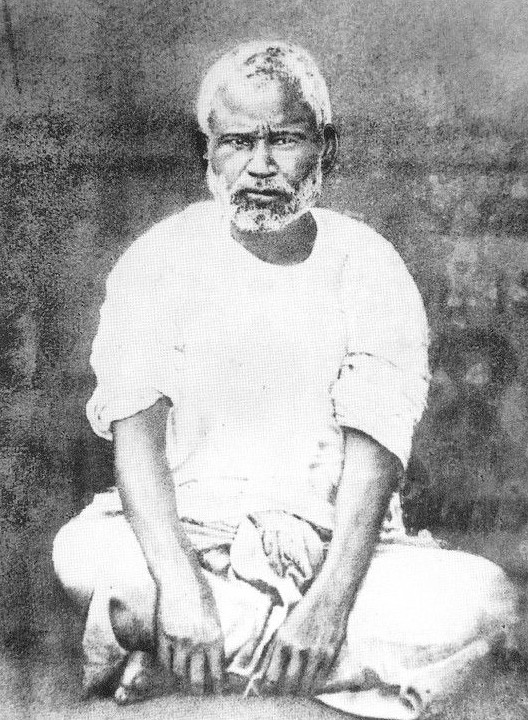
Adbhutananda

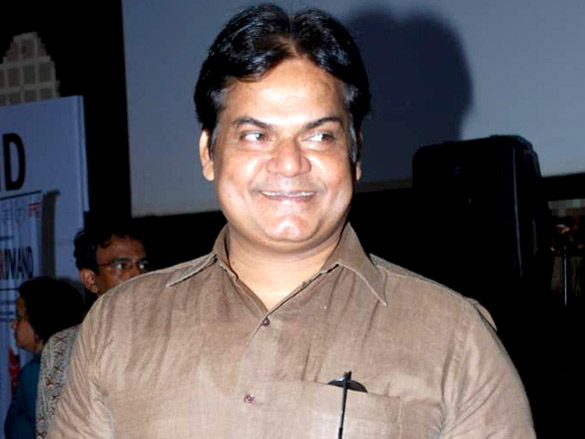
Akhilendra Mishra

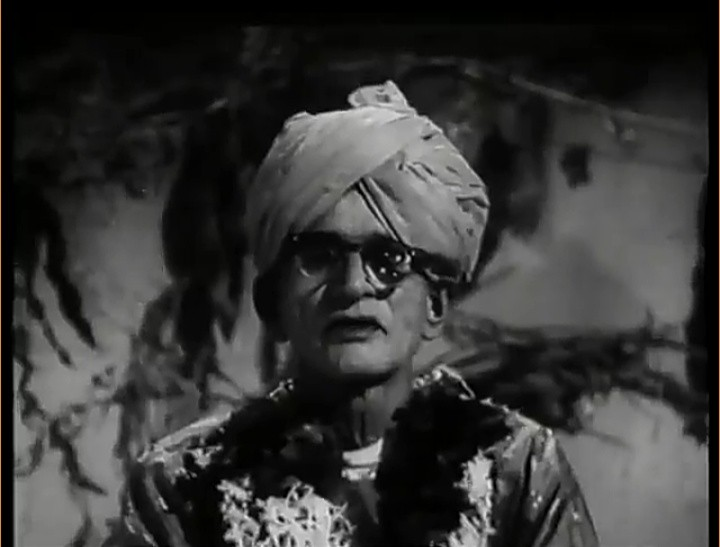
Bhikhari Thakur

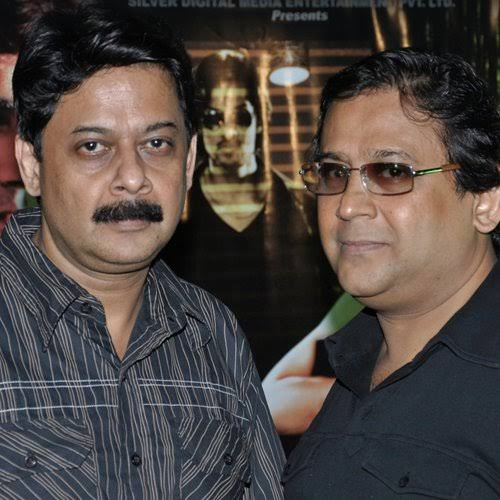
Anand–Milind

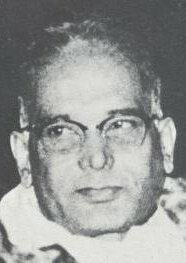
Jayaprakash Narayan

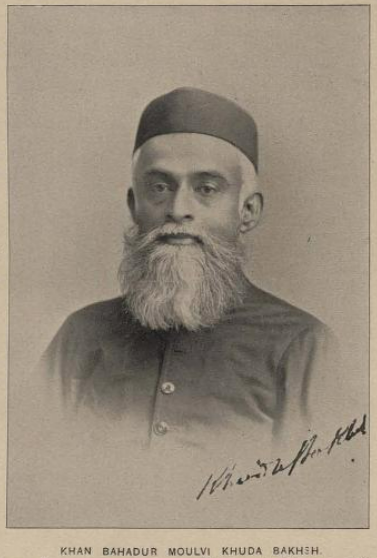
Khuda Bakhsh

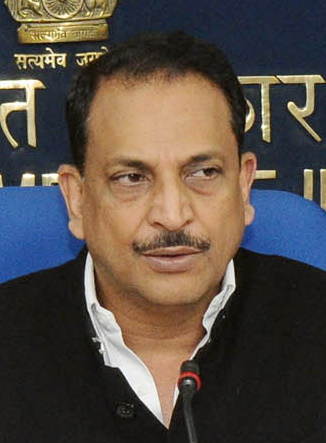
Rajiv Pratap Rudy
- Adbhutananda, Hindu monk, disciple of Ramakrishna
- Akhilendra Mishra, Bollywood actor
- Anand–Milind, music director
- Bhikhari Thakur, Bhojpuri language poet and singer
- Brajkishore Prasad, national activist
- Chitragupta (composer), music director
- Daroga Prasad Rai, 10th Chief Minister of Bihar
- Jayaprakash Narayan, Indian independence activist
- Khuda Bakhsh 1842–1908, Indian lawyer, judge, historian and founder of Khuda Bakhsh Oriental Library, Patna
- Mahendar Misir, Bhojpuri poet
- Raghuveer Narayan, Bhojpuri poet
- Rajiv Pratap Rudy, Minister of State (Independent Charge) Skill Development and Entrepreneurship
- Ramchandra Manjhi, Bhojpuri folk dancer
- Surur Hoda, Socialist leader and Order of British Empire (OBE) recipient

== See also ==
- Muzaffarpur
- Patna
- Gorakhpur
- Saran district
