= Prasiddha Narayan Singh =

Bhojpuri Poet and freedom fighter

Prasiddha Narayan Singh (born 1903) was a Bhojpuri writer, poet, and a freedom fighter. He is known for his patriotic and encouraging poems. He chose his first name as his pen name as Prasiddh Narayan Singh 'Prasiddh'. Jawaharlal Nehru appreciated his poem Jawahar Swagat on his visit of Ballia during the freedom movement. Many of his poems were written during his prison days at District Jail Ballia and District Jail Banaras. His poems also highlight the impoverished lives of downtrodden poor citizens unchanged even after independence. He was concerned that the fruits of the independence movement were limited to the few while the vast majority remained untouched. He wrote his poems in Kaithi script alongside Devanagari script. Much of his works is still limited to his personal copies and diaries and yet to get published.

== Life ==
He was born in 1903 at Chitbara Gaon village in Ballia district of the United Provinces of Agra and Oudh. His father was Jagmohan Singh, who had left his ancestral home in Kotwari village near Rasra and settled in his wife's home at nearby village of Chitbara Gaon. Prasiddh Narayan Singh had two younger brothers, Deep Narayan Singh and Raj Narayan Singh. In his earlier days, he was a worker in Meston High School and later left the job to full-time join the independence struggle as a freedom fighter. He got associated with Indian National Congress and started his political career. He was one of the prominent close associates of Chittu Pandey in forming the government in Ballia during the Quit India movement. After independence, he got disenchanted with the way many other politicians indulged in their personal growth at the cost of the nation, and he initially joined the Swatantra Party and later left the political life. Later, alongwith many other freedom fighters from eastern Uttar Pradesh, he settled in the Terai area, south of Kumaon region, near Kichha (now in Udham Singh Nagar district of Uttarakhand), and he kept on shuttling between Ballia and Kichha during his final days of life.

== Works ==
=== Bhojpuri ===
- Balidani Ballia (Book)
- Jawahar Swagat (Poem)

=== Hindi ===
- Ballia Jile ke Kavi aur Lekhak (Book)
- Dorup (poem)
- Phool Daliya (with poems in both Hindi and Bhojpuri)
