= Rajendra College, Chapra =

Degree college in Bihar

- Motto: नास्ति विद्या समम् चक्षुः
- Motto in English: There is no sight better than knowledge !
- Constituent unit of: Jai Prakash University
- Type: Public
- Established: 1 August 1938 (88 years ago)
- Academic affiliations: Bihar School Examination Board
- Principal: Dr. Sushil Kumar Srivastava
- Academic staff: 73
- Location: Takkad Morde, near Gudari Bazar, Chhapra, Bihar, 841301, India; 25°47′07″N 84°42′59″E
- Website: www.rcc.ac.in

Rajendra College, Chapra is a government college in Chapra district of Bihar, India, established in 1938. The college is named after the first President of India, Deshratna Dr. Rajendra Prasad. It is the senior most constituent unit of Jai Prakash University. The college offers intermediate, UG, & PG level studies. It is also affiliated with Bihar School Examination Board for intermediate board exams.

== Departments ==
College has five faculties:

=== Faculty of Humanities ===
- Hindi
- English
- Sanskrit
- Urdu
- Philosophy

=== Faculty of Science ===
- Physics
- Chemistry
- Mathematics
- Botany
- Zoology

=== Faculty of Social Science ===
- Economics
- Political Science
- History
- Geography
- Psychology

== Notable Faculties ==
- Manoranjan Prasad Sinha
