= Bidesiya (film) =

- Directed by: S. N. Tripathi
- Written by: Ram Murti Chaturvedi
- Screenplay by: Ram Murti Chaturvedi
- Story by: Bhikhari Thakur
- Based on: Bidesiya by Bhikhari Thakur
- Produced by: Bachubhai Shah
- Starring: Sujit Kumar
- Release date: 1963
- Country: India
- Language: Bhojpuri

Bidesiya is a Bhojpuri film that was released in 1963 and was directed by S. N. Tripathi produced by Bachubhai Shah.

== Plot ==
Bidesi Thakur is an Upper-caste youth from Jalalpur village who runs a Paan shop. Parbatiya is a Chamar girl who comes to Bidesi's shop with her aunt, where the two fall in love. They started a love affair. Bidesi's uncle who is a rich and powerful pervert old man sees Parbatiya and keeps a bad eye on her. Bidesi drops Parbatiya to her home on his horse cart. Bidesi's uncle tries to convince him to leave Parbatiya and it creates an argument between them. The aunt advises him to go somewhere else as he has made many enemies to stand against the Caste system. As soon as, Bidesi leaves, Thakur's men adbuct Parbatiya. The Aunt decides to call Bidesi back. She finds that Bidesi is in Benaras. He returns to the village and Thakur's men try to beat him, Parabtiya goes to rescue him where she is mistakenly shot by the bullet fired by the Thakur to kill Bidesiya.

== Cast ==
- Kumari Naaz as Parvati
- Sujit Kumar as Bidesi Thakur
- Jeevan as Chhote Thakur
- Padma Khanna as Chhoti Malkin
- Helen as Dancer in Nautanki
- Bela Bose as Kaharan Dancer
- Sohanlal
- Sadhana Roychoudhury
- Sulochana Chatterjee
- Sheelkumar
- S.N. Tripathi
- Mukhtar Ahmed
- T.N. Sinha

== Release ==
The film released in September 1963 Jamana Picture Palace of Varanasi, Shyam Talkies of Muzaffarpur. On 27 September it released in Oriental, Prabhat and Janata of Kolkata.

== Reception ==
It Muzaffarpur, more than 1600 tickets were sold on the first day.

== Music ==
The score and soundtrack for film was composed by S. N. Tripathi and lyrics were written by Ram Moorti Chaturvedi. The tracks in this film are:

#	Title	Singer(s)	Duration
1	"Dinwa Ginat Mori"	Suman Kalyanpur	3:16
2	"Rimjhim Barshela Sawanwa (Kajri)"	Geeta Dutt, Koumudi Mazumdar	3:37
3	"Ishq Karaye O Jiski Jem Me (Kajri)"	Mahendra Kapoor, Manna Dey	3:27
4	"Ban Jaion Piya Ki Jogan (Chaiti)"	Suman Kalyanpur	3:17
5	"Hansi Hansi Panwa Khiwanle"	Mahendra Kapoor, Manna Dey	3:31
6	"Jaan Like Hatheli Par"	Geeta Dutt, Manna Dey	3:24

== See also ==
- Bhojpuri Film Industry
- List of Bhojpuri films
