= Biraha Bahar =

Bhojpuri Play by Bhikhari Thakur

- Written by: Bhikhari Thakur
- Original language: Bhojpuri
- Subject: Cleanliness, Spirituality
- Genre: Theatre, Dialogue, Biraha

Premiere

Biraha Bahar (IAST: Birahā Bahār) is the first play written by Bhikhari Thakur. It is a musical play written in Biraha genre as a mystic Dialogue between a Washerwoman (Dhobin) and Washerman (Dhobi). This play gives the message that cleaning is not only limited to washermen instead it is there in every profession. Just like a washerman cleans clothes, a Koiri washes vegetables, farmer's job cleans his field, in the same way a human's job is to clean his soul because god resides in cleanliness.
