= Maithili-Bhojpuri Academy, Delhi =

Cultural academy in Delhi, India

- Formation: 2008
- Type: Language and cultural academy
- Purpose: Promotion of Maithili and Bhojpuri language, literature and culture
- Headquarters: Aapurti Bhawan, Aram Bagh Lane, Paharganj, New Delhi
- Region served: Delhi
- Official language: Maithili, Bhojpuri
- Parent organization: Government of the National Capital Territory of Delhi

Maithili-Bhojpuri Academy, Delhi is an autonomous cultural institution under the Government of the National Capital Territory of Delhi, India. The academy is dedicated to the promotion, preservation, and development of the Maithili and Bhojpuri languages, along with their literature, folk traditions, and cultural heritage, particularly among speakers residing in Delhi.

== History ==
The Maithili-Bhojpuri Academy was established in 2008 by the Government of Delhi. The decision to establish the academy was taken by the Delhi Cabinet in early 2008, recognising the significant population of Maithili and Bhojpuri speakers in the National Capital Territory and the need for institutional support to preserve and promote these languages.

The first official notification constituting the academy was issued on 3 April 2008, and the inaugural meeting of its governing body was held on 21 April 2008. Since its establishment, the academy has functioned as an autonomous organisation receiving financial assistance from the Government of Delhi.

== Objectives ==
The objectives of the academy include:

- Promotion and development of the Maithili and Bhojpuri languages
- Encouragement of literary creation, research, and scholarship
- Preservation of folk traditions, performing arts, and cultural heritage
- Publication of books, journals, and other literary works
- Organisation of seminars, workshops, and cultural programmes

== Activities ==
The Maithili-Bhojpuri Academy regularly organises cultural and literary programmes such as poetry recitals, theatre performances, folk music and dance events, and academic seminars. Between 2008 and 2013, the academy conducted a range of programmes highlighting classical and contemporary Maithili and Bhojpuri literature and theatre, including performances of traditional Bhojpuri plays such as Bidesia.

The academy also undertakes publication activities and publishes books and literary journals in Maithili and Bhojpuri to support writers, researchers, and emerging literary voices.

== Administration ==
The academy functions as an autonomous organisation funded by the Government of Delhi. Its headquarters is located at Aapurti Bhawan, Aram Bagh Lane, Paharganj, New Delhi.

== Educational initiatives ==
The academy has supported initiatives aimed at strengthening the presence of regional languages in formal education. In collaboration with the Government of Delhi, steps were taken to allow Maithili to be offered as an optional subject for students in Classes 8 to 12 in Delhi government schools.

== See also ==
- Bhojpuri language
- Maithili language
