= Bidesiya (play) =

Bhojpuri Play by Bhikhari Thakur

- Written by: Bhikhari Thakur
- Original language: Bhojpuri
- Subject: Migration, Women Empowerment, Poverty
- Genre: Theatre
- Setting: A Village in Bihar-Purvanchal, Kolkata

Premiere
- Date premiered: 1912

Bidesiya or Baharā Bahār is a Bhojpuri play by Bhojpuri playwright Bhikhari Thakur. It is one of the several plays written by Bhikhari Thakur on women empowerment, migration and poverty. Owing to its popularity it becomes the folk theatre style of Bhojpuri region, some scholars has also claimed it to be as popular as Ramayana in those days.

The play depicts the condition of women in Bhojpuri Society in the 19th century, the problem of migration and poverty. The play was composed and staged in 1912 and published as a book in 1917.

== Theme ==
Bidesiya focuses on the theme of separation between husband and wife like the Meghadūta and Ramayana of Sanskrit.

== Names ==
This play was published as Kaljug Bahar then it was published as Bahara Bahar, due to its character named Bidesiya it became famous with the name Bidesiya.

== Characters ==
The play Bidesia has primarily five characters:

- Bidesiya – The main character, who goes to earn in Calcutta and remarries there.
- Pyari Sundari – Bidesiya's wife
- Batohiya – A traveller.
- Saloni – Bidesiya's second wife
- Devar – Bidesiya's brother
- Dost – Bidesiya's friend
- Other characters – Two children, one villager
- Labaar – They are called Vidushak in Classical Indian theatre. They usually enter in the play in between and entertain the audience with their jokes.

== Synopsis ==
The play starts with Mangalachran which means Prayer to god. After that the Sutradhar comes on the stage and introduces the audience with the Characters and story line of the play. After that the play starts

=== Story ===
The play starts with a conversation between Bidesiya or Bidesi and Pyari Sundari(His wife), where Bidesiya adduces his will to leaving the village and going to Calcutta for earning. His wife tries to stop him but he doesn't stop. After going to Calcutta He doesn't come for years and the Pyari Sundari waits for him to return.

One day a traveller (Batohiya) was going through the village, Pyari Sundari asks him to send her message to Bidesiya. When Batohiya reaches Calcutta he sees that Bidesiya has married to a woman named Saloni. Batohi tells him pyari's condition that how eagerly she has been waiting for him for years. Bidesiya realizes his mistake and decides to return home. Saloni asks him not to go, but he returns to home. He reaches home and knocks on the door, his wife is scared, she asks who are you in fear, he says that I am your husband, she opens the door in fear and becomes unconscious upon seeing her husband standing in front. Saloni also comes behind Bidesiya to his village and says what will she do without him. At last Pyari also accepts Saloni as her Sautan.

== Message ==
Bidesiya has put the problem of poverty, migration and their impact in a very entertaining form.

== Performances ==
Bidesiya is staged every year in Nandikar's National Theatre Festival.

== Popularity ==
The play became very popular in North Indian States like Bihar, Uttar Pradesh, Jharkhand and West Bengal. Due to its popularity it became the folk theatre style of Bhojpuri region.

== Adaptations and Cultural references ==
=== In various theatres ===
- Hindi theatre also adopted the Bidesiya folk theatre style. Plays like Harikesh Muluk and Mati Gadi gained immense popularity using the Bidesiya theatre style.
- Kannada play Rūpasēna is also based on Bidesiya, It reached to North Karnataka via Maharashtra. The skeleton of the story of the play is totally inspired by Bidesiya.

=== In films ===
- The Bhojpuri film Bidesiya directed by S. N. Tripathi released in 1963 was adaption of the play.
- Another movie of the same name starring Dinesh Lal Yadav Nirahua was too inspired from this play.

== Bibliography ==
- Kumar, Pankaj (2022), Bhikhari Thakur's Bidesia and Gabar Ghichor: Enduring saga of angst, pain and longing of the 'left-behind'
