= Beti Bechwa =

Bhojpuri Play by Bhikhari Thakur

- Written by: Bhikhari Thakur
- Subject: Women Empowerment, Poverty
- Genre: Theatre

Premiere
- Date: 1925

Beti Bechwa (Bhojpuri: 𑂥𑂵𑂗𑂲 𑂥𑂵𑂒𑂫𑂰, lit. 'The Daughter seller'), (also known as Beti Biyog, Bhojpuri: 𑂥𑂵𑂗𑂲 𑂥𑂱𑂨𑂷𑂏, lit. 'Separation from a daughter') is a Bhojpuri play by Playwright Bhikhari Thakur. It was one of several plays written by Thakur based on true events, showing the bad side of society, poverty and Women Empowerment. The play shows the practice of mismatched marriages which are executed between young girls and aged men in exchange of money for the girl's family.

== Characters ==
- Upato: A young girl
- Lobha: Upato's mother
- Chatak: Upato's father
- Gotiya: A relative of Chatak
- Pandit: A priest
- Dulaha: An old man and Upato's Husband
- Panch: Judge of village court
- Other characters: Some women and Baratis

== Plot ==
Upato is the daughter of Lobha (mother) and Chatak (father). Due to the poor condition of the family they find it difficult to marry Upato and decided to sell her to any rich family. A person named Jhantul lives in a village named Baklolpur (trans.: City of fools), who is very rich, aged and unmarried. Chatak fixes Upato's marriage with him and took the money. No one knows about this in the village, When the barat arrives, everyone is astonished to see the groom. An old man with no teeth and muscle on his body.

Lobha wanted to sell her daughter but not with an old groom. Somehow she let the marriage happen and Upato went to Jhatul's home. Chatak goes to meet Upato after marriage when she asks him that what mistakes did she make that she is facing this. Greedy Chatak had no answer to this question. After somedays Upato came to her parents' home and Jhatul accompanies her. In Panchayat it is decided that since Upato is married to Jhatul now she had to live with him. Upato's Mother Lobha blames his father Chatak for this condition of their daughter.

== Impact ==
This play was so impactful that, There are stories of young girls leaving the mandap and running away instead of docilely marrying the old men their parents have taken money from. In Nautanwa village in Uttar Pradesh, after the play was staged there, the villagers sent back a Baraat of an old bridegroom. After a performance in Dhanbad, Jharkhand, some members of the audience marched to a nearby temple and took an oath that they would stop this practice.

Shivlal Bari, an artist who worked with Bhikhari Thakur, said that after watching this play people stopped selling there daughter.

== Bibliography ==
- Dost, Jainendera (2017). "Naach, Launda Naach or Bidesiya Politics of (re)naming". Performance Research. 22 (5): 106–112. doi:10.1080/13528165.2017.1384187. S2CID 158697968.
- Rai, Sandeeo (2020). Aesthetics and Politics: Two leading Bhojpuri Artists (1st ed.). Wadala (East), Mumbai: Becomeshakespeare.com. ISBN 978-93-90543-50-2.
