= Gabarghichor =

Bhojpuri Play by Bhikhari Thakur

- Written by: Bhikhari Thakur
- Subject: Migration, Women Empowerment
- Genre: Epic theatre

Gabarghichor (Bhojpuri: 𑂏𑂥𑂩𑂐𑂲𑂒𑂷𑂩) is a play by Bhojpuri playwright Bhikhari Thakur (1887–1971). The play is about a woman, whose husband was a migrants and she had an illegal relationship with a man of her village and a child named Gabarghichor from that man. It is sometimes compared to Bertolt Brecht’s The Caucasian Chalk Circle.

== Characters ==
The play have five main Character:

- Galij bo :- A married women living with her son and her husband is a migrant who has gone to Calcutta for living.
- Gabarghichor :- 15-year-old son of Galij bo.
- Galij :- Husband of Galij bo who works in Calcutta.
- Garbari :- A villager with who Galij bo has extramarital Affairs.
- Panch :- The judge of Village court.

== Plot ==
=== Storyline ===
This play is set in a village, where Galij returns from Kolkata after years and sees a 15 year old lad named Gabarghichor in his house, who the villagers call the son of Galij bo (wife of Galij). There was also a gossip in the village regarding the biological father of Gabarghichor.

Galij wants to take Gabarghichor back to Calcutta but Garbari (the biological father of Gabarghichor) intervenes and claims that Gabarghichor belong to him. It leads to a quarrel between Galij Bo, Galij and Gadbari as each of them were claiming Gabarghichor to be theirs. All of them put their points in font of Sarpanch (Justice) in the Panchayat (Village's court). Galij says that since Galij Bo is his wife, the son belongs to him, whereas Garbari puts the point that he is his biological father. At last, Galij Bo puts her point that since she is her mother, Gabarghichor belongs to her. The judges decided to give the son to Galij Bo, as they found her claim to be most valid, but Galij and Garbari offers the judges some bribe to announce the judgement in their favour.

At last, the Panchayat decides to cut Gabarghichor into three pieces. A man comes and measures Gabarghichor's body and agrees to do the job for four annas a piece. The mother relents and is ready to give up her claim on the son. The panchayat finally decides that Ghichor should stay with his mother.

== Translations ==
=== In English ===
- Thakur Bhikhari, Gupta Meenu "Gabar Ghichor" Indian Literature 44#1 (2000): 127–140.
