= Bhikhari Thakur =

Founder of Bhojpuri Song

Bhikari Thakur
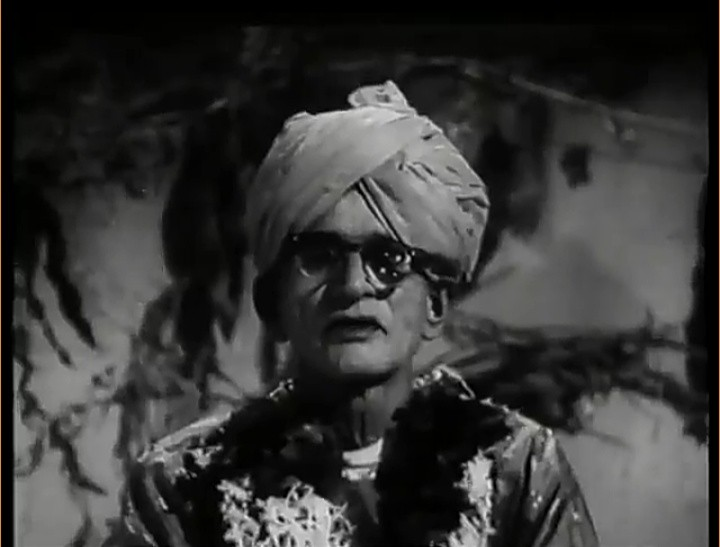
- Bhikari Thakur
- Born: Bhikari Thakur; 18 December 1887; Qutubpur, Shahabad, Bengal Presidency, British India (now Saran District, Bihar, India)
- Died: 10 July 1971 (aged 83)
- Resting place: Ashes scattered in the Ganges
- Occupations: Poet; dramatist; composer; philosopher; social reformer; Singer; Dancer; Actor
- Spouse: Manturna
- Children: 1, Shilanath Thakur
- Writing career
- Language: Bhojpuri
- Period: British Raj, Independent India
- Notable works: Bidesiya; Beti Bechwa; Gabarghichor
- Movement: Feminism

Places in Bihar associated with Bhikari Thakur

Bhikari Thakur (18 December 1887 – 10 July 1971) was an Indian Bhojpuri language poet, playwright, lyricist, actor, folk dancer, folk singer and social activist. He is widely regarded as one of the greatest writers in the Bhojpuri language and most popular folk writer of Purvanchal and Bihar. Thakur is often called the "Shakespeare of Bhojpuri" and "Rai Bahadur". His works consist of more than a dozen plays, Monologues, poems, and Bhajans, which were printed in nearly three dozen books. His noteworthy works include Bidesiya, Gabarghichor, Beti Bechwa and Bhai Birodh. Gabarghichor is often compared with Bertolt Brecht's play The Caucasian Chalk Circle. Thakur is known as the father of the naach folk theatre tradition. He is also credited as the first person to cast male actors in female roles.

Thakur was born and raised in Kutubpur village of Saran. In his adolescence, he married Matuna from whom he had only one son: Shilanath Thakur. In the early 1900s, Thakur started his career as an actor, writer, singer and dancer. He remained active until his death in 1971. Thakur published most of his works between 1938 and 1962. His early works were dialogues and musical plays; his later works were philosophical, Bhajans, Harikirtans, and other poems.

== Life ==
=== Early life ===
Thakur was born in a barber family on 18 December 1887 in Kutubpur or Qutubpur diyara village of Chhapra. Initially, his village was the part of Shahabad district (present Bhojpur), but in 1926, due to the change in the course of the Ganges, the village became part of the Saran district. His maternal grandmother's house remained in Arrah. He was Dalsingar Thakur's son, a barber by profession. His mother's name was Sivkali Devi. Bhikhari Thakur was the elder of two sons, the younger one was Bahor Thakur. Due to family poverty, Thakur could not even complete his primary education. He had knowledge of only Kaithi alphabets and Ramcharitmanas. In his adolescence, he married Matuna, who gave birth to a son, Shilanath Thakur, in 1911. In his childhood he used to graze cattle. When he grew up he had to adopt his family profession of a barber. However, he wanted to do something else, and so he shifted from his village to the neighbouring Fatanpur village. In 1914, when Thakur was 27 years old, famine struck his village. After that, he left his family in search of work and went to Kharagpur, where his uncle had also migrated before.

From Kharagpur, he went to Puri and then Calcutta, and followed his traditional occupation of cutting hair. This was the first time that he realised that the country in which he lived was Hindustan and was ruled by the Angrej. He used to watch the Ramlila, and from there he got the inspiration to write and act in plays. He also watched "Silema" (Cinema) for the first time and met Babulal, a person from Bihar who used to run a "naach hall". He returned to his village, formed a drama company, and started performing Ramlila.

=== Career ===
In the early part of the twentieth century, Bhikari Thakur returned to his village and started presenting Ramlila with a small troupe. But upper caste Hindus opposed performing such important religious texts by lower caste people like Thakur. Therefore, Thakur formed a theatrical company and started writing and directing plays by his own. Most of his plays used to revolve around the plight of women, village folks and confrontation between old values and modern values. The first play written by Thakur was Biraha Bahar. He wrote his most famous play Bidesiya in 1917, when he was 30 years old. Between 1938 and 1962, more than three dozen books of Bhikhari Thakur were published. Most of the books were published by Dudhnath Press (Howrah) and Kachaudi Gali (Varanasi).

He impressed people all over Bihar, Jharkhand, Uttar Pradesh and Bengal by his performances. He used to visit place to place with the artists of his theatre company to perform at marriages and other events and used to charge a lump sum. He went to Arrah, Ballia, Muzaffarpur, Gorakhpur, Jaunpur, Jharia and as far as Dibrugarh in Assam to perform. However, despite his popularity, he also faced disdain for his low caste and for performing Launda Naach by dressing himself in women clothes. A humongous number of people would gather to watch his plays, especially for Bidesiya, whenever and wherever Bidesiya was staged and played, there used to be an uncontrollable crowd. Thakur's plays were so impactful that, There are stories of young girls leaving the mandap and running away instead of docilely marrying the old men their parents have taken money from.

Owing to his popularity, people started selling pirated copies of his books and even such books that were not written by him, for this he had to write "Bhikhari Pustika Suchi", which had the list and details of all of his published works. He also wrote "Bhikhari Shanka Shamadhan" to clear fake news that was spreading about him.

=== Last years and death ===
In 1946, Cholera swept his village in which his wife died when he was touring for one his shows. His mother also died when he was touring. In 1963, the Bhojpuri movie Bidesiya was released which was based on his play. in the movie, Bhikhari Thakur made a special appearance, where he recited his own poem "Dagaria johat na". Thakur died on 10 July 1971.

== Theatrical company ==
In the early 20th century, Bhikhari formed his own theatre company against his parents' will. In early days, his company used to perform only Ramlila, but later it started staging plays written by himself. Most of his plays were performed under open sky on an elevated platform surrounded by audience. His company had skilled singers, dancers and actors. Some notable names are Ramchandra Manjhi (dancer), Mahendra (singer), Ram Lacchan and Juthan were comedians, musicians were Ghinawan (Dholak), Tafzul (Tal), Alijan (Sarangi) and Jagdeo (Harmonium).

In those days, due to Parda system, it was very hard for women to perform in plays, Bhikhari Thakur included the Launda dancers to cast them as women in his plays. Later it became one of the greatest attractions of his plays. In January 2021 government of India felicitated Ramchandra Manjhi, a Launda dancer of his company with Padma Shri, the fourth highest civilian honour of India.

== Works ==
Bhikhari Thakur's works were mostly based on the problems of society like the plight of migrants and women, and poverty. Thakur published almost 3 dozen books and booklets in his career. His published and unpublished works were compiled by Bhikhari Thakur Aashram and published in three parts as Bhikhari Thakur Granthavali. The first part was published in 1979 in which his five plays are compiled namely, Bidesiya, Bhai Birodh, Beti Bechwa, Kaljug Prem and Radheshyam Bahar. The second part was published in 1986 in which five more plays are there, namely Putra Badh, Gabarghichor, Nanad-Bhaujai, Ganga Asnan and Bidhwa Bilaap. The third and last part has his other plays, songs and monologues.

== Issues raised ==
In Thakur's work there was a hidden protest against the oppressive, feudal, casteist and patriarchal system. The main issue that he raised were migration, poverty, mismatch marriages.

=== Migration ===
Migration and its impact on the society were the central issues that Thakur raised through his works. Most of his works like Bidesiya and Gabarghichor were based on migration.

𑂣𑂱𑂨𑂫𑂰 𑂏𑂅𑂪𑂵 𑂍𑂪𑂍𑂞𑂫𑂰 𑂉 𑂮𑂔𑂢𑂲
𑂞𑂴𑂚 𑂠𑂱𑂯𑂪𑂵 𑂣𑂞𑂱-𑂣𑂞𑂹𑂢𑂲 𑂢𑂞𑂫𑂰 𑂉 𑂮𑂔𑂢𑂲
𑂏𑂷𑂚𑂫𑂰 𑂧𑂵 𑂔𑂴𑂞𑂰 𑂢𑂅𑂎𑂵, 𑂮𑂱𑂩𑂫𑂰 𑂣𑂵 𑂓𑂰𑂞𑂰𑂫𑂰 𑂉 𑂮𑂔𑂢𑂲
𑂍𑂅𑂮𑂵 𑂒𑂪𑂱𑂯𑂵 𑂩𑂰𑂯𑂰𑂞𑂰𑂫𑂰 𑂉 𑂮𑂔𑂢𑂲...

piya'vā ga'ïlēṃ ka'la'ka'ta'vā ē sa'jnī
tūṛ diha'leṃ pa'ti-p'atni na'tvā ē sa'jnī
goṛa'vā mē jutā na'ïkhe sira'vā pe chāta'vā ē sa'jnī
ka'ïse ca'liheṃ rāhātāvā ē saja'nī

Your Husband went to Calcutta, O Sajni!, breaking the ties of Husband and wife. There are no shoes in his feet and umbrella over his head, O Sajni. How will he walk on the road, O Sajni!

In his plays, the migration mostly led to separation between Husband and wife, due to which the women had to face a lot of hardship as her husband would send any money to her not any letter.

=== Mismatch Marriages ===
From his play, Beti Bechwa he raises the issue of marriages of young girl with old landlords in the exchange of money.

=== Lives of women ===
Thakur's work were full of analysis of a woman's life, condition and state of mind in various stages of life. A main theme is the suffering of the left-behind; the wives who could not accompany their migrating husbands. His plays give a voice to their angst, pain, and longing. The protagonists of Bidesia and Gabar Ghichor, Pyaari Sundari and Galij Bahu, are both newlywed wives who suffer from loneliness. The plays explore the different paths these women take. Pyaari Sundari waits for her husband, fighting to protect her chastity, which was seen as synonymous with her husband's honor. On the other hand, Galij Bahu succumbs to her desires in a moment of weakness, leading to social disgrace. Thakur uses her character to question societal stereotypes, presenting a sympathetic picture of a woman who exercises her own choice, even if it leads to condemnation. Thakur also highlights the double standard of the society, where men like Bidesi could have illicit relationships with other women, while the wives left behind were expected to remain perfectly chaste. This is further explored through the character of Saloni in Bidesia, an migrant woman in a temporary marriage with Bidesi, who represents another facet of female suffering due to migration.

In Beti Bechwa and Nanad Bhaujai he depicted the life of a young girl; Bhai Birodh, Ganga Asnan and Putra Badh he talked about married women. In Bidhwa Bilaap, Gabarghichor he has talked about women with migrant husbands. In Kaljug Prem, he has shown the sorrow and exploitation of a woman by her alcoholic husband. In Gabarghichor, he has shown a very radical character of women whose migrant husband has not returned for years. She gets in an extramarital relationship with another man and gives birth to a son.

== Style and contributions ==
Bhikhari Thakur's plays were different from typical modern plays of the 20th century, which used to have dialogues only. Thakur's plays were closer to the style used in classical Sanskrit theatre and Shakespeare's style, which contained both songs and dialogues. Plays written by Thakur imbibed many principles from the Classical Indian Theatre. For example, his plays used to start with maṃgalācaran which is an essential part of Sanskrit plays in which prayers are dedicated to Ganapati and Saraswati, asking for the blessings. They also had Samājī which is equivalent to Shutradhāra of Sanskrit theatre and Chorus of Greek Theatre. The samaji used to explain about the play in the Prologue, its characters and used to draw example parallel to Hindu mythology. Another important part of his plays were labār which are known as viduṣak in Indian classical theatre, who used to come in the middle of the play just to entertain the audience by doing some comedy. The characters of the plays of Bhikhari Thakur are of types representing the general rather than the particular. For example, in the play Bidesiya, the character of Bidesi represents all the young men who used to go to Assam and Bengal for earning. Similarly Batohi means Traveller and represents a random person who is going to Kolkata.

He incorporated everything that he found appropriate and exciting from other popular theatre in his plays. His Bidesiya is the blend of religious, secular, Tragedy, Comedy, traditional and modern theatre genre. He also included instruments like Tabla, Harmonium, Dholak, Sitar, Jhal, and Bansi. He also adopted all the popular Bhojpuri Folk songs genre in his plays like Biraha, Purbi, Kajari, Alha, Fagua, Chaita, Sorathi, Chaubola etc. He also created a new form of Chhand which is called Bidesiya Chhand, unlike the chhands in vernaculars, which are Matrik, Bidesiya chhand is Varnik or syllabic like classical Sanskrit poetry, which have 32 syllables in each line like Ghankashari Chhanda of Sanskrit. For example, in Bidesiya, Pyari is expounding her husband's appearance to Batohi:

Kariyā nā gor bāte, lāmā nāhi hawan nāte (17),
Majilā jawān sām sundar batohiyā(15)...

𑂍𑂩𑂱𑂨𑂰 𑂢𑂰 𑂏𑂷𑂩 𑂥𑂰𑂞𑂵, 𑂪𑂰𑂧𑂰 𑂢𑂰𑂯𑂱 𑂯𑂫𑂢 𑂢𑂰𑂗𑂵 (१७), 𑂧𑂕𑂱𑂪𑂰 𑂔𑂫𑂰𑂢𑂹 𑂮𑂰𑂧 𑂮𑂳𑂢𑂹𑂠𑂩 𑂥𑂗𑂷𑂯𑂱𑂨𑂰 (१५)

== Messages and impact ==
The plays and songs of Bhikhari Thakur depict the evils that were corroding the society. Bidesiya depicts the pain of a woman whose husband leaves her and marries another woman, Beti Bechwa depicts the practice of unequal marriage, Bidhwa Bilaap depicts that a widow is treated and cheated by the society and her family. Besides social problems, Thakur has also talked about the separation of joint families in Bhai Birodh and Nanad-Bhaujai. In Kaljug Prem or Piyawa Nasaïl, he has shown the consequences of drinking and impact on the family. In Putrabadh, a stepmother plans to kill her stepson. Ganga Asnan exposes the frauds of the dhongi Brahmins. His plays and songs did the biggest impact on the caste system.

He started a social movement by his plays. There are stories of young girls leaving the mandap and running away instead of docilely marrying the old men their parents have taken money from. In Nautanwa village in Uttar Pradesh, after the play was staged there, the villagers sent back a Baraat of an old bridegroom. After a performance in Dhanbad, Jharkhand, some members of the audience marched to a nearby temple and took an oath that they would stop this practice.

== Filmography ==
Thakur made a special appearance in a song of Bhojpuri movie Bidesiya in 1963. In the film, Thakur recites his own poetry.

== Critical reputation ==
Statue or Bhikhari Thakur in Chhapra

Bhikhari Thakur got immense appreciation for his play who used to reveal the reality of the society. People called him with the titles like Raibahadur and Shakespeare of Bhojpuri. Rahul Sankrityayan who gave him the title of Shakespeare has commented on him: In 1944, Bihar Government gave him the title of Rai Bahadur or Rai Sahab and was felicitated with a Copper Shield. Kalpana Patowary, the famous Bhojpuri folk singer from Assam, who has compiled Thakur's songs in the album named The Legacy of Bhikhari Thakur, has commented on Thakur that:

== Reception by Feudal-Casteist society ==
Bhikhari Thakur, despite having a great impact among the lower class, was beaten up by several caste and classes on various occasions.

== Adaptations of works ==
- The Bhojpuri films Bidesiya (1963) and Bidesiya (2007) were based on his play.
- The song Ae Sajni re written by Thakur was recreated in 2005 Bollywood film Hazaaron Khwaishein Aisi and 2007 Bhojpuri film Bidesiya.
- The song Kholu Kholu Dhaniya from his play Bidesiya was recreated in the 2007 Bhojpuri film Bidesiya.
- The Bidesiya theatre genre also influenced theatres of other languages other than Bhojpuri, Rūpasēna of Kannada and Harikesh Muluk play of Hindi are written in the Bidesiya style.
- The Legacy of Bhikhari Thakur is a music album composed of nine songs written by Bhikhari Thakur and sung by Kalpana Patowary.
- Story of the Award Winning Punjabi film Kudesan is inspired from Thakur's Beti Bechwa.

== Legacy ==
- Bhikharinama is a musical play written on the life of Bhikhari Thakur.
- A 72 minutes long Documentary film on Launda Naach is named after him i.e. "Naach Bhikhari Naach".
- The Hindi novel Sutradhar (The Narrator), written by the author Sanjeev is based on Thakur's life.

== See also ==
- The Legacy of Bhikhari Thakur
- List of Indian writers
- List of Indian poets

== Bibliography ==
- Prasad, Maheshwar (1964), Jankavi Bhikhari Thakur, Bhojpuri Pariwar Patna
- Maheshwaracharya (1978), Bhikhari: Bhojpuri ke Lok kalakar bhakt Bhikhari Thakur ki Samast rachnaon ka vishleshana [Bhikhari: A critical study of all writings of Bhojpuri Folk-Dramatist and Devotee Bhikhari], Lok Kalakar Bhikhari Thakur Aashram
- Dwiwedi, B.P. (2000), Bhikhari Thakur: Bhojpuri ke Bharatendu, Aashu Prakashan
- Rai, D.N. (2004), Lok Kalakar Bhikhari Thakur-Iyadan ke khoh se (in Bhojpuri), Shree Madhav Press, Chhapra
- Singh, Dhananjay (2008), Bhojpuri Pravasi Shramikon ki Sanskriti aur Bhikhari Thakur ka Sahitya (in Hindi), NLI Research studies series
- Dost, Jainendera (2017). "Naach, Launda Naach or Bidesiya Politics of (re)naming". Performance Research. 22 (5): 106–112. doi:10.1080/13528165.2017.1384187. S2CID 158697968.
- Kumar, Pankaj (2022), Bhikhari Thakur's Bidesia and Gabar Ghichor: Enduring saga of angst, pain and longing of the 'left-behind'
- Rai, Sandeep (2020). Aesthetics and Politicd: Two Leading Bhojpuri Artists (1st ed.). Wadala (East), Mumbai: BecomeShakespeare.com. ISBN 978-93-90543-50-2.
