= Bhojpuri language =

Indo-Aryan language

Bhojpuri
- भोजपुरी · 𑂦𑂷𑂔𑂣𑂳𑂩𑂲
- The word "Bhojpuri" in the Devanagari script
- Native to: India; Nepal
- Region: Bhojpur-Purvanchal; Terai
- Ethnicity: Bhojpuriya
- Native speakers: 52.2 million, partial count (2011 census) (additional speakers counted under Hindi)
- Language family: Indo-European: Indo-Iranian; Indo-Aryan; Eastern; Bihari; Bhojpuri
- Early forms: Magadhi Prakrit: Magadhan Apabhraṃśa; Abahattha
- Dialects: Northern Standard Bhojpuri; Western Standard Bhojpuri; Southern Standard Bhojpuri; Domra; Musahari; Mauritian Bhojpuri; South African Bhojpuri (Naitali); Caribbean Hindustani (incl. Sarnami Hindustani); Fiji Hindi
- Writing system: Devanagari; Kaithi (historical)

Official status
- Recognised minority language in: India; Jharkhand; Nepal; Madhesh Province; Lumbini Province; Fiji (as Fiji Hindi); Mauritius (as Mauritian Bhojpuri)
- Regulated by: India; Bihar (Bhojpuri Academy); Delhi (Maithili-Bhojpuri Academy, Delhi); Madhya Pradesh (Bhojpuri Sahitya Academy); Mauritius (Mahatma Gandhi Institute); Nepal (Bhojpuri Academy, Birganj); Trinidad and Tobago (Caribbean Hindustani Inc.); Suriname (Sarnami Bol Inc.)

Language codes
- ISO 639-2: bho
- ISO 639-3: bho
- Glottolog: bhoj1244
- Linguasphere: 59-AAF-sa

A speaker of Bhojpuri

Bhojpuri (IPA: /ˌboʊdʒˈpʊəri/; Devanagari: भोजपुरी, Kaithi: 𑂦𑂷𑂔𑂣𑂳𑂩𑂲, (IPA: [bʰoːdʒpʊɾiː])) is an Indo-Aryan language native to the Bhojpur-Purvanchal region of India and the Terai region of Nepal. It is chiefly spoken in eastern Uttar Pradesh, western Bihar, and northwestern Jharkhand in India, as well as western Madhesh, eastern Lumbini, Chitwan District of Bagmati, and Nawalpur District of Gandaki in Nepal. According to the 2011 Census of India, it is spoken by approximately 50.5 million people.

It is also a minority language in Fiji, Mauritius, and historically primarily in the Natal province of South Africa. Fiji Hindi, an official language of Fiji, is a variant of Awadhi and Bhojpuri spoken by the Indo-Fijians. Caribbean Hindustani, another language influenced by Awadhi and Bhojpuri is spoken by the Indo-Caribbean people in Suriname, Trinidad and Tobago, Guyana, and Jamaica. In Suriname the specific dialect is called Sarnami. In Mauritius, Mauritian Bhojpuri is recognised by the government and taught in university as well.

Bhojpuri is listed as a potentially vulnerable language in the UNESCO World Atlas of Languages.

== Name ==
The oldest presence of the word "Bhojpuri" is found as Bodjpooria in 1789 in the translator's preface of a book titled A Translation of the Sëir Mutaqherin, which is a translation of a Persian book written in 1780 by Ghulam Hussain Khan. The paragraph in which reads:

"Don't make so much noise" said of them in his Bhojpooria idiom, "we go to-day with the Frenghees, but we all are servant to Chëyt Singh, and may come back tomorrow with him and then question will not be about your roots, but about your wives and daughters."

— A Translation of the Sëir Mutaqherin, Translator's Preface

The word Bhojpuri is derived from Bhojpur. After the conquest of Chero and Ujjainiya Rajputs in 12th century, who were the descendants of Raja Bhoj from Ujjain, Malwa, Madhya Pradesh captured Shahabad and named their capital Bhojpur (City of Raja Bhoj). The seat of their government was Bhojpur village which was near Dumraon in Buxar. Two villages named Chhotka Bhojpur and Barka Bhojpur still exist in Buxar, where the ruins of their Navratna Fortress can still be seen. Slowly the word Bhojpur became the synonyms of the Shahabad or Arrah region (Today's Bhojpur district, Buxar, Kaimur and Rohtas) and the adjective Bhojpuri or Bhojpuriya extended to mean the language or people of Bhojpur and even beyond it. Apart from Bhojpuri in the Eastern UP and Western Bihar, there were other names also for the language and people, at different places, the Bhojpuriya in Mughal armies were used to called Buxariya. In Bengal, they called Paschhimas (Westerners) and Bhojpuri people also called them Deshwali or Khoṭṭa, in upper provinces like Oudh they called Purabiya. Besides these, Banarasi, Chhaprahiya, and Bangarahi has also used for the language and People. Rahul Sankrityayan has suggested two names for it i.e. Mallika or Malli (due to ancient tribe of Malla) and Kashiki (due to ancient Kashi). The Girmityas who were taken to British colonies called it simply Hindustani, Hindi, or Indian and it became Fiji Hindi in Fiji and Caribbean Hindustani in the Caribbean region. Similarly, in South Africa, while often locally referred to by speakers as 'Hindustani', the variety brought by indentured labourers who embarked at Calcutta was also known as Kalkatia and later as Naitali.

== Classification ==
Major Indo-Aryan languages of South Asia; Eastern Indo-Aryan languages in shades of yellow

Bhojpuri is an Indo-European language and belongs to the Eastern Indo-Aryan group of the Indo-Aryan languages. The Magahi and Maithili languages of Eastern Indo-Aryan group are closest living relatives of Bhojpuri. Odia, Bengali and Assamese are also closely related. Bhojpuri, Magahi and Maithili are grouped together as the Bihari languages. Together with the other branches of Eastern Indo-Aryan, the Bihari languages are considered to be direct descendants of the Magadhi Prakrit.

Bhojpuri is classified as an Eastern Indo-Aryan Language because it has similar inflexion system to the other languages of the same family such as Bengali, Maithili and Odia. For example, the pronunciation of the vowel a is broad in Eastern Indo-Aryan languages, and sounds like o in Bengali, on moving westwards it becomes less broad but still can be differentiated from the sharp cut a in Middle Indo-Aryan. In Bhojpuri, the clear cut a and the drawled a, which sounds like aw in the word awl are present and the contrast between the two gives a different tone to the language. This drawled a is represented by Avagraha (ऽ), for instance, the word dekh'la, you see, is written as देेखऽलऽ. Other property of Eastern Indo Aryan languages is that the adjectives does not change with the noun. For instance, moṭā is the feminine form of moṭī in Hindi. However, as with Bengali, in Bhojpuri, only moṭ is used. The past and future tense in Bhojpuri is formed in same way as other Eastern Indo-Aryan Languages, by adding a suffix stating from -la and -ba respectively to the verb. Form example, I shall See, in Bengali is dekh-bo and in Bhojpuri is dekh-ab.

Some scholars has also divided the East Indo Aryan or Magadhan languages in to three sub-groups viz. Western, Central and Eastern. Bengali, Assamese, Odia belongs to Eastern Magadhan, Maithili and Magahi to Central and Bhojpuri to western. Bhojpuri is classified as Western Magadhan because it has some properties which are peculiar to itself and are not present in other Magadhan Languages. Some striking differences are:

- raürā or raüwā as an honorfic pronoun for second person along with the apne form is used Bhojpuri. apne form is their in other Magadhan Languages but raüwā is totally absent.
- Verb substantive in other Magadhan language is of -acch for but Bhojpuri has -baṭe and hawe.
- The simple present is made by Bhojpuri by adding a suffix starting from -la with the verb, but this is totally absent in the other languages of Magadhan group. Hence, he sees, is dēkhe-lā in Bhojpuri but in but dekhait-chhi in Maithili and dekhechhi in Bengali.

== History ==
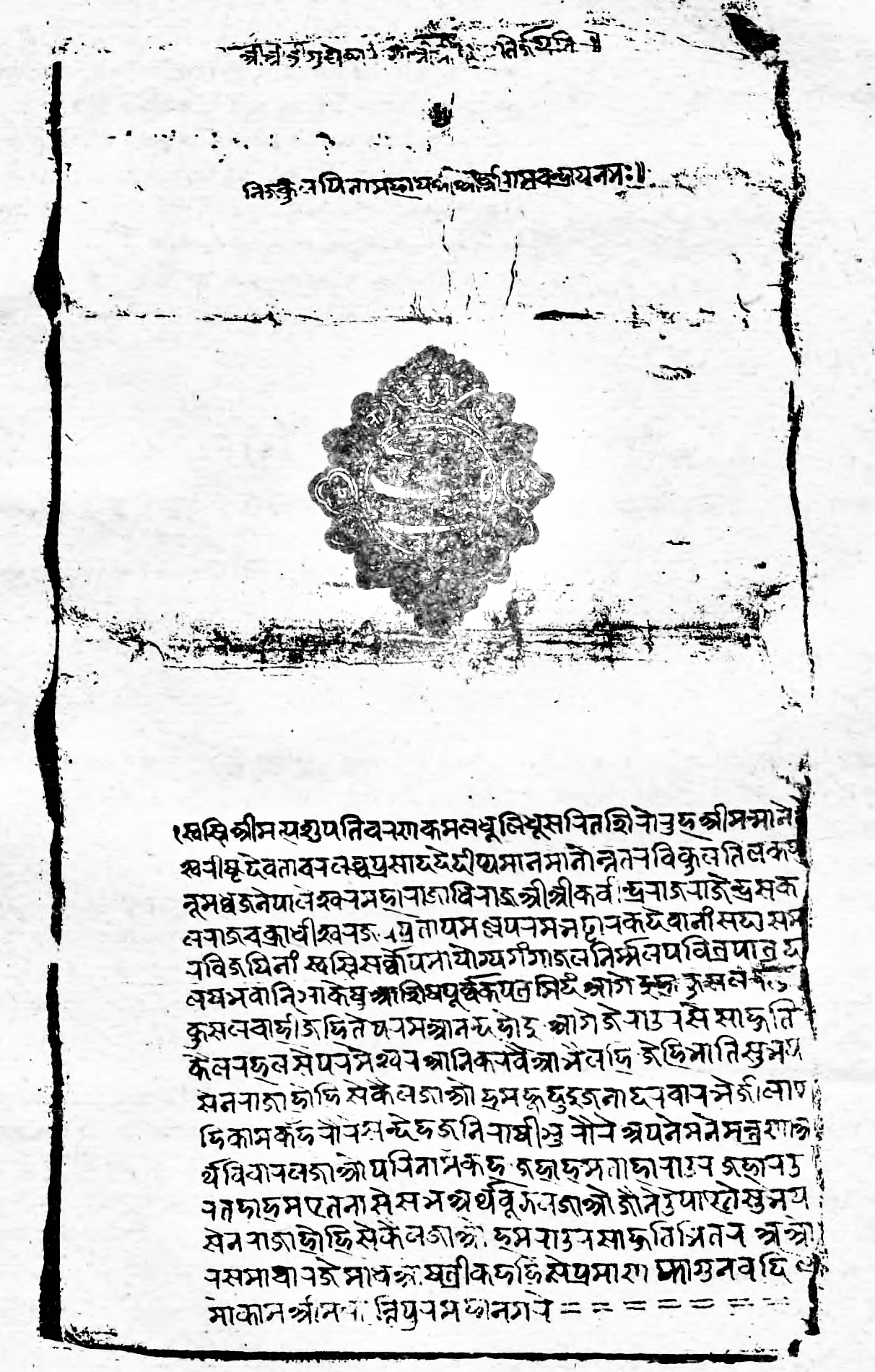
A letter from King Pratap Malla (r. 1641-1674) of Kantipur to Dalakhamba Baniya in the Bhojpuri language.

Bhojpuri is a descendant of Magadhi Prakrit which started taking shape during the reign of the Vardhana dynasty. Bāṇabhaṭṭa, in his Harshacharita has mentioned two poets named Isānchandra and Benibhārata who used to write in local language instead of Prakrit and Sanskrit.

=== Initial period (700–1100 A.D.) ===
Some scholar enthusiasts like to trace the literary history of Bhojpuri from Siddha Sahitya, as early as the 8th century A.D.. But it's not widely accepted.

=== 1100–1400 A.D. ===
Between the 11th and 14th centuries A.D., much Bhojpuri folklore such as Lorikayan, Sorathi Birjabh, Vijaymal, Gopichand, Raja Bharthariar came into existence. Alongside these, the Nath Saint composed literature in Bhojpuri. In this period, the Bhojpuri language altered and its regional boundaries were established.

=== Period of saints (1400–1700 A.D.) ===
In this era, saints from different sects such as Kabir, Dharni Das, Kina Ram and Dariya Saheb used Bhojpuri as their language of discourse. In the same period Arabic and Persian words came into Bhojpuri. Folk songs are also said to have been composed in this era.

=== Early research period (1700–1900 A.D.) ===
A document of Horil Siha, the King of Bhojpur, dated 1728, script: Kaithi

Kaithi: 𑂮𑂹𑂫𑂷𑂮𑂹𑂞𑂱 𑂮𑂹𑂩𑂱 𑂩𑂱𑂣𑂳𑂩𑂰𑂔 𑂠𑂶𑂞𑂹𑂨𑂢𑂰𑂩𑂰𑂉𑂢𑂵𑂞𑂹𑂨-𑂄𑂠𑂱 𑂥𑂱𑂥𑂱𑂡 𑂥𑂱𑂩𑂠𑂫𑂪𑂲 𑂥𑂱𑂩𑂰𑂔𑂧𑂰𑂢 𑂧𑂢𑂷𑂢𑂞 𑂮𑂹𑂩𑂲 𑂧𑂰𑂯𑂰𑂩𑂰𑂔𑂰𑂡𑂱𑂩𑂰𑂔 𑂩𑂰𑂔𑂰 𑂮𑂹𑂩𑂲-𑂔𑂱𑂫 𑂠𑂵𑂫 𑂠𑂵𑂫𑂰𑂢𑂰𑂧𑂹 𑂮𑂠𑂰 𑂮𑂧𑂩 𑂥𑂱𑂔𑂶𑂢𑂰𑃀 𑂄𑂏𑂵 𑂮𑂳𑂫𑂁𑂮 𑂣𑂰𑂁𑂚𑂵 𑂣𑂩𑂰-𑂄𑂏 𑂍𑂵 𑂇𑂣𑂩𑂷𑂯𑂱𑂞 𑂣𑂰𑂓𑂱𑂪 𑂩𑂰𑂔𑂢𑂹𑂯 𑂍𑂵 𑂇𑂣𑂩𑂷𑂯𑂱𑂞 𑂯𑂈𑂯𑂲 𑂮𑂵 𑂯𑂧𑂯𑂳 𑂄𑂣𑂢 𑂇𑂣𑂩𑂷𑂯𑂱𑂞 𑂍𑂆𑂪𑃀 𑂔𑂵 𑂍𑂵𑂇 𑂣𑂩𑂰-𑂃𑂏 𑂧𑂰𑂯 𑂄𑂫𑂵 𑂮𑂵 𑂮𑂳𑂫𑂁𑂮 𑂣𑂰𑂁𑂚𑂵 𑂍𑂵 𑂧𑂰𑂢𑂵, 𑂇𑂔𑂵𑂢 𑂢𑂰𑂫 𑃁𑃀 ११३६ 𑂮𑂰𑂪 𑂧𑂷𑂍𑂰𑂧 𑂠𑂰𑂫𑂰 𑂡𑂳𑂮 𑂮𑂧𑂞 १७८५ 𑂮𑂧𑂶 𑂢𑂰𑂧 𑂥𑂶𑂮𑂰𑂎 𑂮𑂳𑂠𑂱 𑂞𑂱𑂩𑂷𑂠𑂮𑂱 𑂩𑂷𑂔 𑂥𑂳𑂡𑃀 𑂣𑂹𑂩𑂏𑂢𑂵 𑂦𑂷𑂔𑂣𑂳𑂩 𑂏𑂷𑂞𑂩 𑂮𑂫𑂢𑂍 𑂧𑂳𑂪 𑂇𑂔𑂵𑂢 𑂔𑂰𑂞𑂱 𑂣𑂰𑂫𑂰𑂩

𑂮𑂳𑂫𑂁𑂮 𑂔𑂵 𑂣𑂰𑂓𑂱𑂪𑂰 𑂩𑂰𑂔𑂢𑂹𑂯 𑂍𑂵 𑂇𑂣𑂩𑂷𑂯𑂱𑂞 𑂯𑂈𑂯𑂲 𑂮𑂵 𑂯𑂧𑂯𑂳 𑂍𑂆𑂪 𑂃𑂣𑂢 𑂇𑂣𑂩𑂷𑂯𑂱𑂞

Devnagari: स्वोस्ति स्रि रिपुराज दैत्यनाराएनेत्य-आदि बिबिध बिरदवली बिराजमान मनोनत स्री माहाराजाधिराज राजा स्री-जिव देव देवानाम् सदा समर बिजैना। आगे सुवंस पांड़े परा-आग के उपरोहित पाछिल राजन्ह के उपरोहित हऊही से हमहु आपन उपरोहित कईल। जे केउ परा-अग माह आवे से सुवंस पांड़े के माने, उजेन नाव ॥। ११३६ साल मोकाम दावा धुस समत १७८५ समै नाम बैसाख सुदि तिरोदसि रोज बुध। प्रगने भोजपुर गोतर सवनक मुल उजेन जाति पावार

सुवंस जे पाछिला राजन्ह के उपरोहित हऊही से हमहु कईल अपन उपरोहित

English Translation: The statement is that: Suvansa pande of Prayag is the priest of the past Rājās, so I also made him my priest. Whosoever among the Ujjen (Rajputs) comes to Prayag should have regard for him. Year 1136 place Dawa (The old place of the Rajas of Bhojpur, now a village) samat 1785 (A.D. 1728) date 13th of the bright part of Baisakha, Wednesday Paragana Bhojpur, Gotra Sawanak, origin Ujen, caste Pawara.

Suvans, who is the priest of the past Rājās, him I also made my priest.

— Horil Siha (King of Bhojpur), Origin and Development of Bhojpuri, pp 218-219

In this period the British established themselves as the colonial power in India, and scholars from Britain conducted the first academic study of Bhojpuri. Bhojpuri folk literature was researched, and the Bhojpuri region was mapped for the first time. In this period Bhojpuri became an international language. Between 1838 and 1917 labourers from the Bhojpuri region were taken to British Colonies like Fiji, Mauritius, Guyana, Trinidad and Tobago and South Africa, as well as the Dutch colony of Suriname as plantation workers. Linguistic analysis of the South African context indicates that while the majority of migrants arriving via Calcutta (1860-1911) originated from Bhojpuri-speaking areas of Bihar and eastern Uttar Pradesh, there was also a substantial presence of speakers from Awadhi-speaking regions. This resulted in a process of language coalescence and the formation of a distinct koiné variety of Bhojpuri in South Africa, influenced by contact between these related dialects. Music genres based on Bhojpuri folk music such as Chutney music, Baithak Gana, Geet Gawanai and Lok Geet arose in those countries. In the Caribbean, particularly Trinidad, the evolution from Bhojpuri folk traditions performed at weddings led to the development of Chutney music as a distinct genre, often incorporating English lyrics and Soca rhythms alongside Bhojpuri elements.

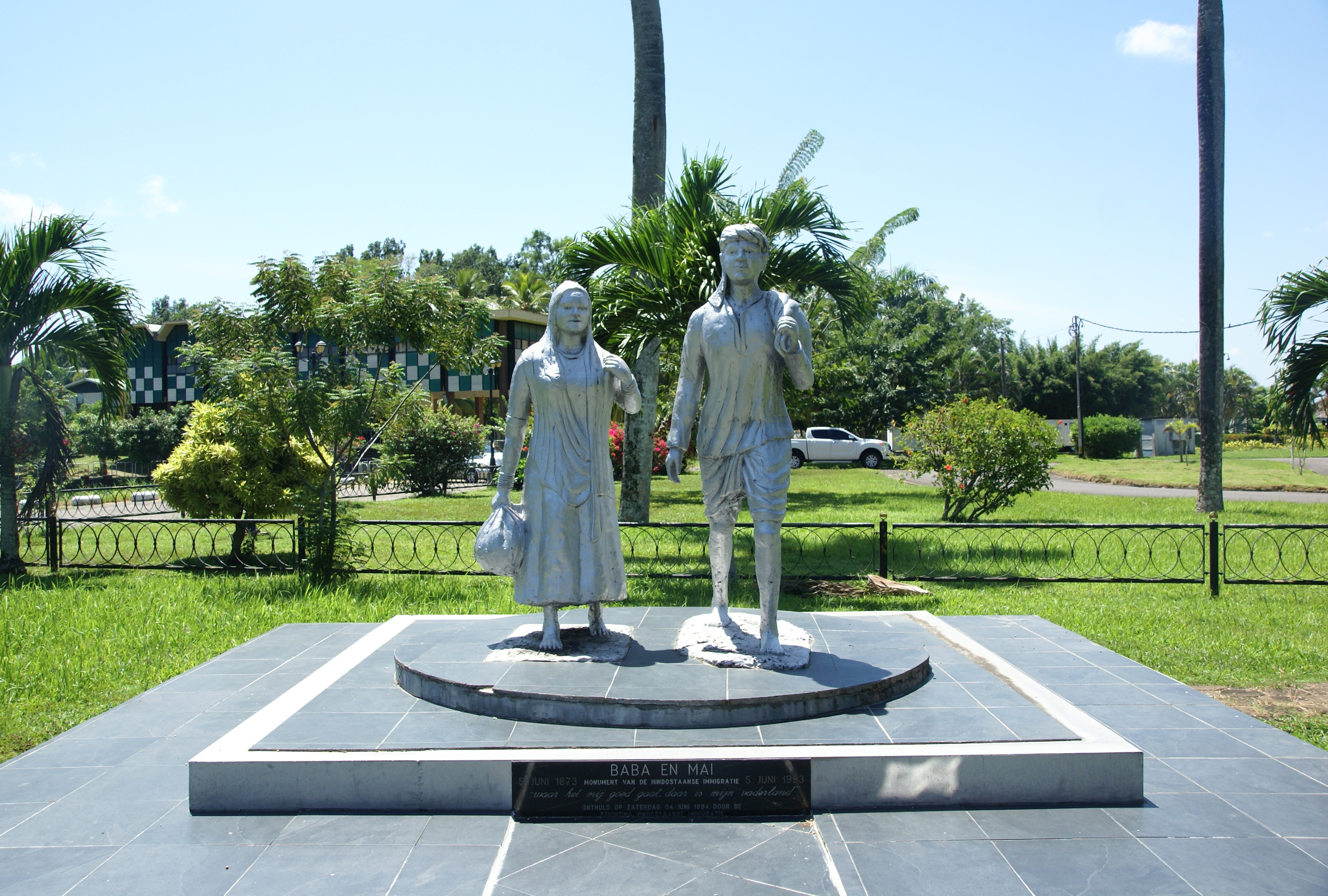
Statue named Baba en Mai commemorating the arrival of first Indian couple in Suriname

British scholars like Buchanan, Beames and George Abraham Grierson studied the language in details. Beames published the grammar of Bhojpuri for the first time in 1868. Grierson compiled and published the folksongs of Bhojpuri in 1884. He published the folklore of Bhojpuri and also made the dictionaries in Bhojpuri. He also conducted the Linguistic Survey of India. In his work, Grierson characterised Bhojpuri as "a practical language of an energetic race"

=== Present period (1900–present) ===
In the 19th century, notable works like Devakshara Charita, Badmash Darpan were published. In the 20th century, Bhikhari Thakur contributed significantly to Bhojpuri literature and theatre with his notable plays like Bidesiya, Beti Bechwa, Gabarghichor and novels like Bindia and Phulsunghi were published. In 1962, the first Bhojpuri film, Ganga Maiyya Tohe Piyari Chadhaibo was released and became the founding stone of the Bhojpuri film industry.

Bhojpuri is listed as a potentially vulnerable language in the UNESCO world atlas of languages due to the influence of Hindi. Words like Bujhã are being replaced by Hindi words like Samjhã.

== Geographic distribution ==
The Bhojpuri-speaking region covers the area of 73,000 square kilometres approximately in India and Nepal and borders the Awadhi-speaking region to the west, the Nepali-speaking region to the north, the Magahi and Bajjika-speaking regions to the east and the Chhattisgarhi and Bagheli-speaking regions to the south. In Nepal, Bhojpuri is a major language in south-western districts bordering Bihar and Uttar Pradesh. There are a number of Bhojpuri-speaking Muslims that are part of the Muhajir community in Pakistan, as well as in Bangladesh, where they are referred to as Stranded Pakistanis due to them speaking Bhojpuri and Urdu as their native tongue and not Bengali as most Bangladeshis do. They migrated to Bangladesh there during the Partition of India when the area was part of East Pakistan, before gaining independence as Bangladesh.

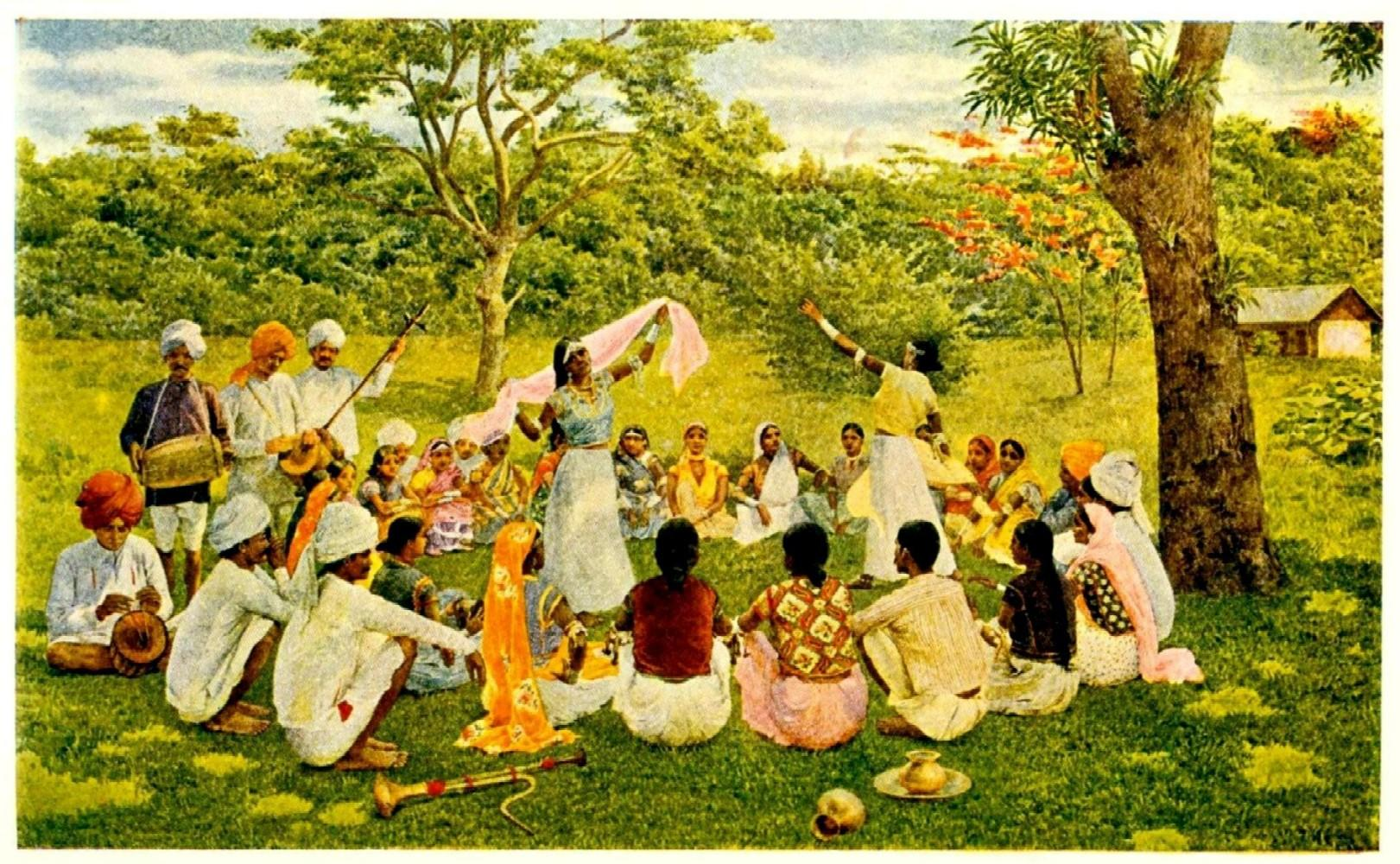
Arrival of Bhojpuri speaking people in Trinidad and Tobago

Bhojpuri is spoken by descendants of indentured labourers brought in the 19th and early 20th centuries for work in plantations in British colonies. These Bhojpuri speakers live in Mauritius, Fiji, South Africa, Trinidad and Tobago, Guyana, Suriname, Jamaica, and other parts of the Caribbean. In South Africa, speakers were historically concentrated in the Natal province. However, the language experienced significant decline throughout the 20th century, undergoing language shift towards English, with intergenerational transmission largely ceasing by the late 1900s. This South African variety also experienced language contact effects from English, Zulu, and Fanagalo. In Mauritius, music is considered a primary vehicle for maintaining the language, with songs often reflecting adaptation to new environments and mixing Bhojpuri with Mauritian Creole. In Trinidad and Tobago, while Caribbean Hindustani remains, popular music forms like Chutney often feature significant English admixture, reflecting linguistic creolisation, as exemplified by artists like Sundar Popo.

== Dialects ==
Bhojpuri has several dialects: Southern Standard Bhojpuri, Northern Standard Bhojpuri, Western Standard Bhojpuri, and Nagpuria Bhojpuri.

Southern Standard Bhojpuri is prevalent in the Shahabad district (Buxar, Bhojpur, Rohtas, and Kaimur districts) and the Saran region (Saran, Siwan and Gopalganj districts) in Bihar, the eastern Azamgarh (Ballia and eastern Mau districts) and Varanasi (eastern part of Ghazipur district) regions in Uttar Pradesh, and in the Palamu division (Palamu and Garhwa districts) in Jharkhand. The dialect is also known as Kharwari.

Northern Bhojpuri is common in the western Tirhut division (east and west Champaran and in Muzaffarpur district) in Bihar, and Gorakhpur division (Deoria, Kushinagar, Gorakhpur, and Maharajganj districts) and Basti division ( Sidharthanagar, and Sant Kabir Nagar districts) in Uttar Pradesh. It is also spoken in Nepal.

Western Bhojpuri is prevalent in the areas of Varanasi (Varanasi, Chandauli, eastern Jaunpur, and the western part of Ghazipur district), Azamgarh (Azamgarh district, western part of Mau district) and Mirzapur (Chunar of eastern Mirzapur and Sonbhadra districts) divisions in Uttar Pradesh. Banarasi is a local name for Bhojpuri, named after Banaras.

Nagpuria Bhojpuri is the southernmost popular dialect, found in the Chota Nagpur Plateau of Jharkhand, particularly parts of Palamu, South Chotanagpur and Kolhan divisions. It is sometimes referred to as Sadari.

A more specific classification recognises the dialects of Bhojpuri as Bhojpuri Domra, Madhesi, Musahari, Northern Standard Bhojpuri (Basti, Gorakhpuri, Sarawaria), Southern Standard Bhojpuri (Kharwari), Western Standard Bhojpuri (Benarsi, Purbi) and Nagpuriya Bhojpuri.

=== Mauritian Bhojpuri ===
Bhojpuri is a major language spoken by Indo-Mauritians, as the majority of the nearly 450,000 indentured labourers who arrived in Mauritius between 1834 and the early 1900s were Bhojpuri speakers who did not return to India. The speech that evolved in Mauritius is not based on a single dialect, but is rather a blend of several varieties of Indian Bhojpuri.

Over time, Mauritian Bhojpuri has undergone grammatical simplification when compared to its Indian counterpart. The most notable change is in the system of personal pronouns and honorifics. The multiple levels of honorifics (e.g., formal ap, informal tu) found in Indian Bhojpuri have been reduced, with Mauritian Bhojpuri primarily using a single form, tou, for "you". Similarly, the second and third-person plural pronouns have been simplified.

In present Mauritius, the language exists in a complex relationship with Mauritian Creole and Hindi. There is a degree of mutual intelligibility with Hindi, partly due to the teaching of Hindi in schools and access to Hindi-language television. Mauritian Bhojpuri has also been influenced by Mauritian Creole, particularly in its sentence structure and through lexical borrowing, with younger and more urban speakers tending to use more Creole words. The influence is bidirectional; it has been documented that Mauritian Creole has borrowed more than 300 words from Indo-Aryan languages, the majority of which are likely from Bhojpuri.

== Phonology ==
Vowels
| | Front | Central | Back |
|---|---|---|---|
| Close | i ɪ | | u |
| Close-mid | e | | o |
| Mid | | ə | |
| Open-mid | ɛ | | ɔ |
| Open | æ | a | |

Consonants
| | | Labial | (Denti-) Alveolar | Retroflex | (Alveolo-) palatal | Velar | Glottal |
|---|---|---|---|---|---|---|---|
| Nasal | | m | n | ɳ | ɲ | ŋ | |
| Stop/ Affricate | voiceless | p | t̪ | ʈ | tɕ | k | |
| Stop/ Affricate | voiced | b | d̪ | ɖ | dʑ | ɡ | |
| Stop/ Affricate | aspirated | pʰ | t̪ʰ | ʈʰ | tɕʰ | kʰ | |
| Stop/ Affricate | breathy voiced | bʱ | d̪ʱ | ɖʱ | dʑʱ | ɡʱ | |
| Fricative | | | s | | | | h |
| Rhotic | plain | | ɾ | ɽ | | | |
| Rhotic | breathy | | ɾʱ | ɽʱ | | | |
| Approximant | | w ~ ʋ | l | | j | | |

Among the seven languages which are sociolinguistically often counted as Hindi dialects (Haryanvi, Braj, Awadhi, Bhojpuri, Bundeli, Bagheli, and Kannauji), Bhojpuri has the most allophonic variations in vowels.

Bhojpuri has 6 vowel phonemes. The higher vowels are relatively tense, and the lower vowels are relatively lax. The language has 31 consonant phonemes and 34 contoids (6 bilabial, 4 apico-dental, 5 apico-alveolar, 7 retroflex, 6 alveo-palatal, 5 dorso-velar, and 1 glottal).

Linguist Robert L. Trammell published the phonology of Northern Standard Bhojpuri in 1971. According to him, the syllable system is peak type: every syllable has the vowel phoneme as the highest point of sonority. Codas may consist of one, two, or three consonants. Vowels occur as simple peaks or as peak nuclei in diphthongs. The intonation system involves 4 pitch levels and 3 terminal contours.

Word-stress in Bhojpuri is phonemic, meaning the placement of stress can change the meaning of a word. For example, the noun सौटा /ˈsota/ ('a short stick') is distinguished from the verb सोटा /soˈta/ ('to be slim') solely by the shift in stress. Additionally, it contains a series of devoicing aspirate sonorants (such as म्ह /mʱ/, न्ह /nʱ/) that function as independent phonemes, distinct from their unaspirated counterparts (like /m/ and /n/).

== Grammar ==
Linguistically, Bhojpuri is an inflecting and almost entirely suffixing language. Nouns are inflected for case, number, and gender, while verbs are inflected for tense, aspect, mood, and person-number-gender agreement. A notable feature is its system of verbal honorifics, which marks politeness towards the subject directly in the verb form. Syntactically, Bhojpuri is a Subject-Object-Verb (SOV) language, though it allows for considerable free word-order. Unlike Hindi, it uses a nominative-accusative case system, does not have an oblique case.

According to George Abraham Grierson, the grammar of Bhojpuri is simpler than other languages of the same family. Nouns in Bhojpuri have three forms: short, long and redundant. The adjectives of nouns do not change with genders. Plurals are made by adding either the suffix -na or ni with the nouns or adding the multitudes such as sabh (all) or lōg (people).

Examples:

| Definition | Singular Form | Plural Form |
|---|---|---|
| House | ghar | gharan |
| Horse | ghoṛā | ghoṛan |
| Boy | laïkā | laïkan/laïka sabh |
| King | rājā | rājā lōg |

Except few instances the Verb forms of Bhojpuri depend only on the subject and the object has no effect on it. Unlike other Eastern Indo-Aryan languages, Bhojpuri has a different verb form for the present tense, which corresponds to the Future forms of Nepali. It is formed by adding the suffix -lā to the present subjunctive. Therefore, for the verb to see the Bhojpuri verb is dekhe and the present form is dhekhelā, which is peculiar to itself and is not found in other languages of the same family like Magahi (dekhaït haï), Maithili (dekhaït achi) and Bengali (dekhechī). The Verbs forms of second person singular (dekh'be; you will see) is considered vulgar in Bhojpuri, plural form (dekhab') is used in general. When it is desired to show respect the first person singular form (dekhab; I will see) is used instead of second person plural (dekhab'). To show plural number the suffix -sa' or -ja is also used with the 2nd and third person forms, thus dekhe-la'-sa is they see. The present perfect form is made by adding ha' to the past form. Thus, ham dekh'li (I saw) is the past from and its present perfect form is ham dekh'li ha' (I have seen). Past perfect in regular verbs are made by adding the suffix -al to the verb (dekh - dekhal), but in some cases it has irregular forms like kar (kail), mar (mual) etc.

Numerals of Bhojpuri take the classifier gō and ṭhō, which emphasises the countability and totality both. To show inclusiveness and exclusiveness, Bhojpuri used the suffixes -o and -e as in ham āmo khāïb (I will eat mangoes too) verses ham āme khāïb (I will eat only mangoes). These suffixes can be added to any lexical category such as numerals, adjectives etc.

The auxiliaries in Bhojpuri are formed on five bases viz. ha, ho, hokh, bāṭ, rah. These also act as the Copula. The bāṭ form provides for the tenses and the hokh or ho form provides for the modes, where as rah is the past of other three.

== Writing system ==
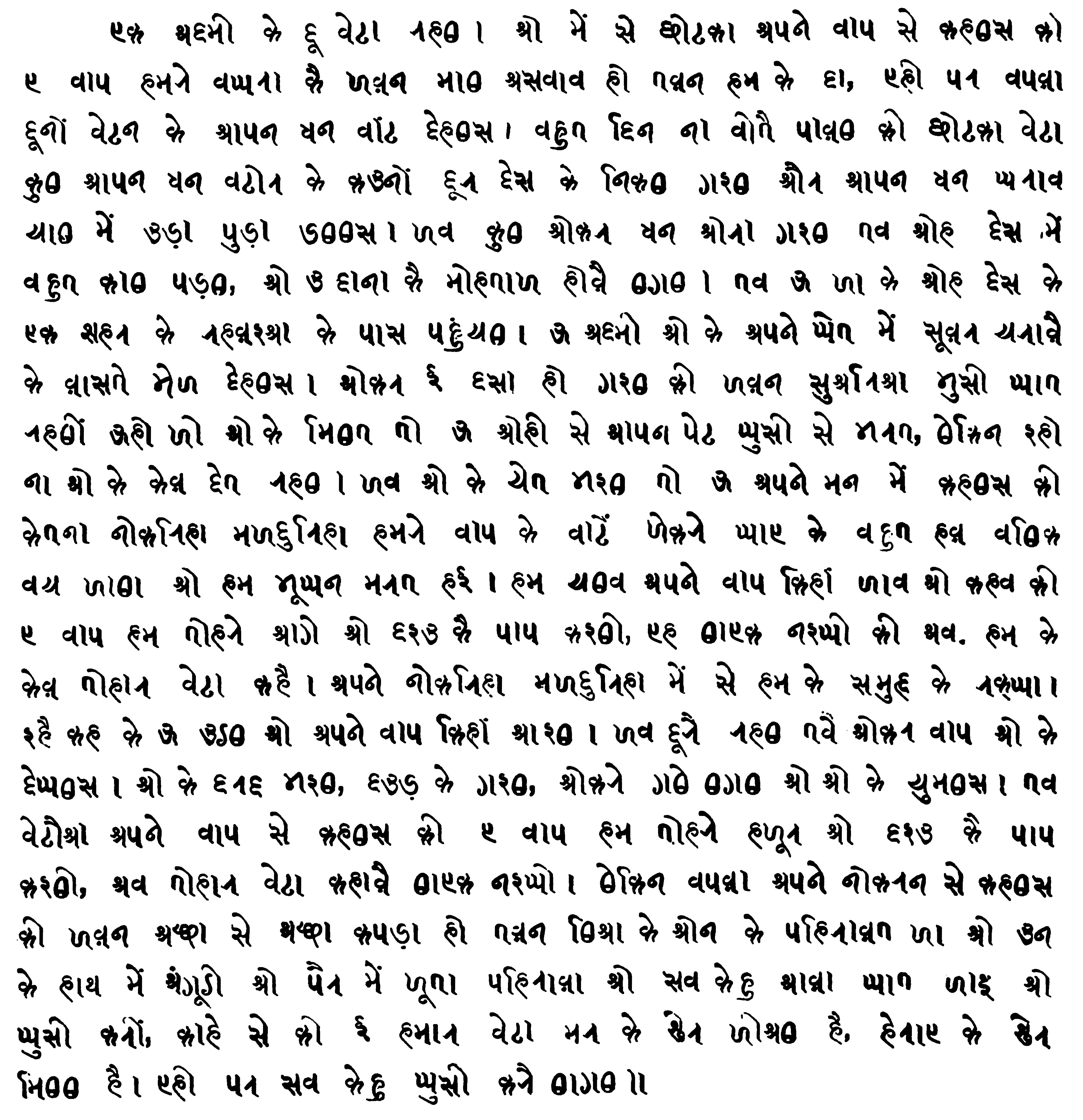
Bhojpuri story written in Kaithi script by Babu Rama Smaran Lal in 1898

Bhojpuri was historically written in Kaithi script, but since 1894 Devanagari has served as the primary script. Kaithi has variants as the locality changes, the three classified variants are Tirhuti, Magahi and Bhojpuri variants. The Bhojpuri variant is used for writing Bhojpuri. Kaithi is now rarely used for Bhojpuri.

Kaithi script was used for administrative purposes in the Mughal era for writing Bhojpuri, Awadhi, Maithili, Magahi, and Hindustani from at least the 16th century up to the first decade of the 20th century. Government gazetteers report that Kaithi was used in a few districts of Bihar throughout the 1960s. Bhojpuri residents of India who moved to British colonies in Africa, the Indian Ocean, and the Caribbean in the 19th and early 20th centuries used both Kaithi and Devanagari scripts.

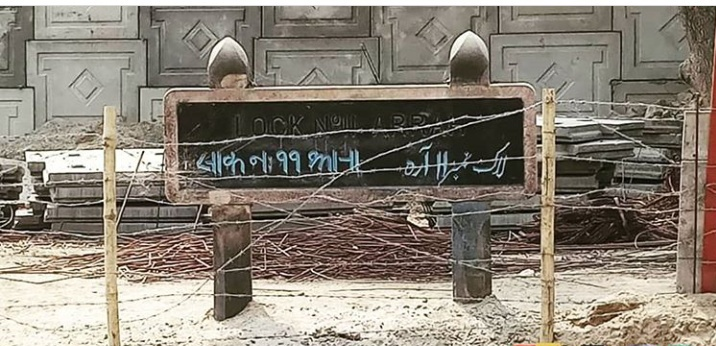
Signboard at Purbi Gumti Arrah with "Lock no. 11" written on the board in Bhojpuri using Kaithi Script (on the left side), Persian script (on the right side) and Roman script (above).

By 1894 both Kaithi and Devanagari became common scripts to write official texts in Bihar. At present almost all Bhojpuri texts are written in Devanagari, even in islands outside of India where Bhojpuri is spoken. In Mauritius, Kaithi script was historically considered informal, and Devanagari was sometimes spelled as Devanagri. In modern Mauritius, the major script is Devanagari.

== Politeness ==
Bhojpuri syntax and vocabulary reflects a three-tier system of politeness. Any verb can be conjugated through these tiers. The verb to come in Bhojpuri is aail and the verb to speak is bolal. The imperatives come! and speak! can be conjugated in five ways, each marking subtle variation in politeness and propriety. These permutations exclude a host of auxiliary verbs and expressions, which can be added to verbs to add another degree of subtle variation. For extremely polite or formal situations, the pronoun is generally omitted.

| Literary | [teh] āō | [teh] bōl |
| Casual and intimate | [tu] āō | [tu] bōl |
| Polite and intimate | [tu] āv' | [tu] bōl' |
| Formal yet intimate | [rau'ā] āīñ | [rau'ā] bōlīñ |
| Polite and formal | [āpne] āīñ | [āpne] bōlīñ |
| Extremely formal | āwal jā'e | bōlal jā'e |

Similarly, adjectives are marked for politeness and formality. The adjective your has several forms with different tones of politeness: tum (casual and intimate), "tōhār" (polite and intimate), "t'hār" (formal yet intimate), rā'ur (polite and formal) and āpke (extremely formal). Although there are many tiers of politeness, Bhojpuri speakers mainly use the form tu to address a younger individual and raua for an individual who is older, or holds a higher position in workplace situations.

== Status ==
Greater official recognition of Bhojpuri, such as by inclusion in the Eighth Schedule to the Constitution of India, has been demanded. In 2018, Bhojpuri was given second-language status in Jharkhand state of India.

Bhojpuri is taught in matriculation and at the higher secondary level in the Bihar School Education Board and the Board of High School and Intermediate Education Uttar Pradesh. It is also taught in various universities in India, such as Veer Kunwar Singh University, Banaras Hindu University, Nalanda Open University, and Dr. Shakuntala Misra National Rehabilitation University.

In the digital and technology spheres, Bhojpuri was long considered a "low-resource language" due to a scarcity of standardised digital data and advanced computational tools. Early academic efforts, such as doctoral research at Jawaharlal Nehru University in 2018, focused on creating the first large-scale digital corpora (text collections) and experimental machine translation systems to begin addressing this gap.

A major milestone in the language's digital presence occurred in May 2022, when Google Translate officially added Bhojpuri to its platform. This significantly improved the language's accessibility and utility for millions of speakers globally. Despite this progress, challenges remain in developing more advanced NLP applications due to wide dialectal variations and the lack of a single, universally adopted standard for writing the language.

== Sociolinguistic context ==
=== Bilingualism and code-switching ===
Due to the prevalence of Hindi as the formal language of education and media, a majority of Bhojpuri speakers are bilingual. This has led to frequent code-switching and the emergence of a mixed language variety sometimes referred to as Bhojpuri-Hindi. For many speakers, Bhojpuri remains the dominant language of the home and informal settings, used for understanding, expression, and inner thought. Hindi, however, is often preferred in formal situations or urban environments, sometimes as a means of showing social status. This dynamic is a central aspect of the language's current context, with some scholars questioning whether it will lead to a new mixed language or the gradual decline of Bhojpuri in certain domains.

=== Linguistic tensions ===
The close interaction between Bhojpuri and Hindi has sometimes led to linguistic tension and activism. A notable example occurred in the Bhojpuri-speaking areas of Patna in the 1960s with the "ne-hatao aandolan" (remove 'ne' movement). This movement was a direct reaction against the Hindi grammatical particle ne (a marker for the agent in certain past-tense constructions), which is absent in Bhojpuri. Bhojpuri speakers found this particle "unnecessary and revolted against its use," organising demonstrations with banners and loudspeakers demanding its removal from Hindi. While the movement was viewed as humorous by some outsiders, it represented a serious assertion of Bhojpuri linguistic identity.

=== Grammatical and lexical transfers ===
The influence of Bhojpuri is evident in the Hindi spoken by bilinguals, who often transfer grammatical features and vocabulary from their native tongue. Some common transfers are:

- Use of the definite noun suffix -wa: For example, using laikwa (the boy) in Hindi instead of the standard Hindi laṛka.
- Substitution of adverbs and interrogatives: Using Bhojpuri words like lage (near) in place of the Hindi pa:s.
- Lexical transfer: Introducing Bhojpuri words into Hindi, which can sometimes lead to a narrowing of the Hindi word's meaning. For example, using the Bhojpuri word for a mature jack-fruit, kaTahar, may lead to the Hindi word being used in a more specific sense.

== Literature ==
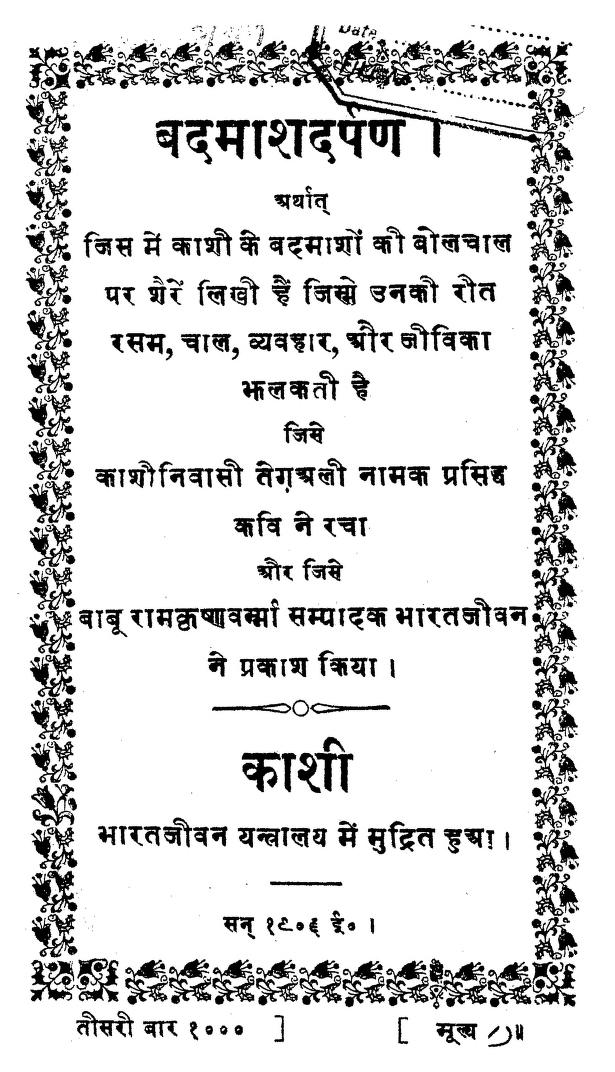
Cover page of Badmash Darpan by Teg Ali Teg

Lorikayan, the story of Veer Lorik contains Bhojpuri folklore from Eastern Uttar Pradesh. Bhikhari Thakur's Bidesiya is a play, written as a book. Phool Daliya is a well-known book by Prasiddha Narayan Singh. It comprises poems of veer ras (A style of writing) on the theme of azaadi (Freedom) about his experiences in the Quit India movement and India's struggle with poverty after the country gained independence.

Although Bhojpuri is not one of the established literary languages of India, it has a strong tradition of oral literature. This "persistent orality" continues in the diaspora, where the language often thrives more through performance, particularly song and music (like folk songs and Chutney), than through formal print literature, adapting across multiple media platforms like radio, recordings, and digital formats.

The oral traditions of Bhojpuri have been a topic of academic research. In the 20th century, scholars documented and analysed the region's folklore. W.G. Archer published collections of folk songs, as did Durga Shankar Prasad Singh, whose work was primarily sourced from women in the Shahabad district. Other researchers like Satya Vrata Sinha focused on the academic classification of folktales. Thematic analysis was also conducted; for instance, V.S. Gautam wrote about the role of folk songs such as Bidesiya in the development of national consciousness during the colonial period.

== Media ==
The first journal to be published in Bhojpuri was Bagsar Samāchar which was published in 1915, but was closed in 1918. The first Bhojpuri weekly was published on 15 August 1947. Bhojpuri journalism rose massively in the 1960s and 1970s. Prominent publications from this era include Anjor, published by the Bhojpuri Parivar organisation in Patna, and journals from Bhojpuri Mandal (Motihari) and Bhojpuri Samaj (Arrah). Another important folkloric journal was Purvaiya from Varanasi.. Many Bhojpuri magazines and papers are published in Bihar, Jharkhand, and Uttar Pradesh. Several Bhojpuri newspapers are available locally in northern India. Parichhan is a contemporary literary-cultural Maithili-Bhojpuri magazine, published by a Maithili-Bhojpuri academy and the government of Delhi, and edited by Parichay Das. The Sunday Indian, Bhojpuri is a regular national news magazine in Bhojpuri. Aakhar is a monthly online Bhojpuri literature magazine. Other media in Bhojpuri include Lok Lucknow, and the channels Mahuaa TV and Hamar TV. Bhojpuri Wikipedia was launched in 2003. On 22 May 2022, Google Translate added Bhojpuri as one of their languages.

== Vocabulary ==
Bhojpuri vocabularies have similarity with other Indo Aryan languages and also have loanwords from Persian. Tiwari has classified the words of Bhojpuri in to 6 parts:

- Words of Sanskrit origin
- Words with untraceable origin
- Words borrowed from other Indo-Aryan Languages
- Sanskrit words either in original or modified form
- Words of non-Aryan Indian origin
- Foreign origin (Arabic, British etc.)

Words of Persian origin are roughly classified under the following head:

- Words pertaining to kingly states: amīr, kābū, hajūr
- Words relating to Revenue, Administration and Law: darogā, hak, huliyā
- Words relating to Islam: Allāh, tobā, mahjid
- Words of intellectual culture, music, education: ilīm, ijjat, munsi
- Words of material culture: kāgaj, kismis, sāl

Since Bengal has been one of the greatest centre for Bhojpuri-speaking people, Bhojpuri has taken a number of words from Bengali. It is also probable that words of European origin came to Bhojpuri through Bengali. The specific vocabulary of South African Bhojpuri also reflects contact with other languages prevalent in the region, notably incorporating loanwords from Zulu and the pidgin Fanagalo, alongside English.

=== Weekdays ===
| English | Bhojpuri (Latin script) | भोजपुरी (देवनागरी लिखाई) |
|---|---|---|
| Sunday | Eitwaar | एतवार |
| Monday | Somaar | सोमार |
| Tuesday | Mangar | मंगर |
| Wednesday | Budhh | बुध |
| Thursday | Biphey | बियफे |
| Friday | Shuk | शुक |
| Saturday | Sanichar | सनिचर |

=== Common phrases ===
| English | Bhojpuri |
|---|---|
| Hello | Raam Raam / Parnaam राम राम / परनाम |
| Welcome/Please come in | Aain na आईं ना |
| How are you? | Ka haal ba? / Kaisan hava? का हाल बा? / कइसन हवऽ? |
| I'm good. And you? / We're good. And you | Hum theek baani. Aur rauwa? / Humni theek hañi. Aur aap? हम ठीक बानी। अउर रउवा? / हमनी ठीक हईं। अउर आप? |
| What is your name? | Tohaar naav ka ha? / Raur naav ka ha? तोहार नाँव का ह? / राउर नाँव का ह? |
| My name is ... | Hamar naav ... ha हमार नाँव ... ह |
| What's up? | Kaa howat aa? का होवत आ? |
| I love you | Hum tohse pyaar kareni / Hum tohra se pyaar kareni हम तोहसे प्यार करेनी / हम तोहरा से प्यार करेनी |

Number
| English | Bhojpuri |
|---|---|
| 1= one | १= ek = एक |
| 2= two | २= du = दु |
| 3= three | ३= teen =तीन |
| 4= four | ४= char = चार |
| 5= five | ५= pan = पान |
| 6= six | ६= chhav = छव |
| 7= seven | ७= sat = सात |
| 8= eight | ८= aath = आठ |
| 9= nine | ९= nav = नव |
| 10= ten | १०= das = दस |
| 100= one hundred | १००= ek say = एक सव |
| 500= five hundred | ५००= pan say = पान सव |
| 1000= one thousand | १०००= ek hajar = एक हजार |

=== Words of English origin ===
- atharāiṭīs (𑂃𑂟𑂩𑂰𑂅𑂗𑂲𑂮/अथराइटीस): From Arthritis.
- afkaran (𑂃𑂤𑂺𑂍𑂩𑂢/अफ़करन): Used in South African Bhojpuri, Borrowed from English phrase "Half a Crown".
- askūṭara (𑂃𑂮𑂹𑂍𑂴𑂗𑂩/अस्कूटर): From Scooter.
- asaṭāṭ (𑂃𑂮𑂗𑂰𑂗/असटाट): From English verb Start. sṭāṭ is used in South Aftican Bhojpuri. It was borrowed in sense of starting a Motor vehicle or any other mechanical device.
- aspatāla (𑂃𑂮𑂹𑂣𑂞𑂰𑂪/अस्पताल): From Hospital.
- injin (𑂅𑂢𑂹𑂔𑂱𑂢/इन्जिन): From Engine.
- eroplena (𑂉𑂩𑂷𑂣𑂪𑂵𑂢/एरोपलेन): From Aeroplane.
- kār (𑂍𑂰𑂩/कार): From English Car. khār is used in South African Bhojpuri.
- ṭībī (𑂗𑂲𑂥𑂲/टीबी): From T.B., the short form of Tuberculosis.
- ṭeksī (𑂗𑂵𑂍𑂹𑂮𑂲/टेक्सी): From Taxi.
- ṭesan (𑂗𑂵𑂮𑂢/टेसन): from English Station.
- ḍākṭar (𑂙𑂰𑂍𑂹𑂗𑂩/डाक्टर): From Doctor. In South African Bhojpuri ḍokṭar or ḍokṭe is used.
- nars (𑂢𑂩𑂹𑂮/नर्स): From Nurse. nes or staf-nes (Staff Nurse) in South African Bhojpuri.
- peṭarol (𑂣𑂵𑂗𑂩𑂷𑂪/पेटरोल): From Petrol.
- palaga (𑂣𑂪𑂏/पलग): From Plug.
- baeṭrī (𑂥𑂉𑂗𑂹𑂩𑂲/बएट्री): From Battery.
- ba's (𑂥𑂮/बस): From Bus. baz in South African Bhojpuri.
- bhaena (𑂦𑂉𑂢/भएन): From Van. ven is used in South African Bhojpuri.
- moṭar (𑂧𑂷𑂗𑂩/मोटर): From English word Motor, also used for Motor vehicle.
- rēl (𑂩𑂵𑂪/रेल): from English rail, meaning Train.
- rēl-gār̤ī (𑂩𑂵𑂪𑂏𑂰𑂚𑂲/रेलगाड़ी): gār̤ī is a Bhojpuri word meaning Vehicle.
- laurī (𑂪𑂸𑂩𑂲/लौरी): From English word Lorry. Lori is used in South African Bhojpuri.
- sāikīl (𑂮𑂰𑂅𑂍𑂲𑂪/साइकील): From bicycle.
- sīka (𑂮𑂲𑂍/सीक): From sick. Used in South African Bhojpuri, with the verbal form sīkā gael (has become sick).
- sūgar (𑂮𑂴𑂏𑂩/सूगर): From sugar, meaning Diabetes.
- hāṭ (𑂯𑂰𑂗/हाट): From Heart, it used for any heart related disease.

== Example text ==
The following is Article 1 of the Universal Declaration of Human Rights in four languages:

- Bhojpuri (kaithi) – 𑂃𑂢𑂳𑂒𑂹𑂓𑂵𑂠 १: 𑂮𑂥𑂯𑂱 𑂪𑂷𑂍𑂰𑂢𑂱 𑂄𑂔𑂰𑂠𑂵 𑂔𑂢𑂹𑂧𑂵𑂪𑂰 𑂄𑂇𑂩 𑂋𑂎𑂱𑂢𑂱𑂨𑂷 𑂍𑂵 𑂥𑂩𑂰𑂥𑂩 𑂮𑂧𑂹𑂧𑂰𑂢 𑂄𑂋𑂩 𑂃𑂡𑂱𑂍𑂰𑂩 𑂣𑂹𑂩𑂰𑂣𑂹𑂞 𑂯𑂫𑂵 𑃀 𑂋𑂎𑂱𑂢𑂱𑂨𑂷 𑂍𑂵 𑂣𑂰𑂮 𑂮𑂧𑂕-𑂥𑂴𑂕 𑂄𑂇𑂩 𑂃𑂢𑂹𑂞:𑂍𑂩𑂝 𑂍𑂵 𑂄𑂫𑂰𑂔 𑂯𑂷𑂎𑂞𑂰 𑂄𑂋𑂩 𑂯𑂳𑂢𑂍𑂷 𑂍𑂵 𑂠𑂷𑂮𑂩𑂰 𑂍𑂵 𑂮𑂰𑂟 𑂦𑂰𑂆𑂒𑂰𑂩𑂵 𑂍𑂵 𑂥𑂵𑂫𑂯𑂰𑂩 𑂍𑂩𑂵 𑂍𑂵 𑂯𑂷𑂎𑂪𑂰 𑃁
- Bhojpuri (Devanagari) – अनुच्छेद १: सबहिं लोकनि स्वतंत्रे जन्मेलन अउर ओखिनियहूं के समान सम्मान अउरी अधिकार प्राप्त हवे। ओखिनियो के पास समझ-बूझ अ अंत:करण के स्वर होखता आओर हुनके हुं के दोसरा के साथ भ्रातृत्त्व के बेवहार करय के चाही।
- Sarnámi Hindustani (a dialect of Caribbean Hindustani) – Aadhiaai 1: Sab djanne aadjádi aur barabar paidaa bhailèn, iddjat aur hak mê. Ohi djanne ke lage sab ke samadj-boedj aur hierdaai hai aur doesare se sab soemmat sè, djaane-maane ke chaahin.

== See also ==
- Culture of Bhojpuri Region
- Bhojpuri cinema

== Bibliography ==
- Rajathi, J; Perumalsamy, P (2021). "Bhojpuri" in Linguistic Survey of India Bihar Volume, New Delhi: Office of the Registrar General. pp. 293–407.
- Pandey, Rasbihari (1986). Bhōpurī Bhāshā kā itihāsa (in Hindi) (1st ed.). Arrah: Lok Sahitya Sangam.
- Tiwari, Uday Narayan (1960). The Origin And Development Of Bhojpuri. The Asiatic Society.
