= List of Bhojpuri films of 2022 =

These are the list of Bhojpuri language films that released in 2022.

== January–March ==
Opening		Title	Director	Cast	Production Company	Ref.
M A R C H	4	Aashiqui	Parag Patil	Khesari Lal Yadav; Amrapali Dubey; Kunal Singh	Enterr10	

== April–June ==
Opening		Title	Director	Cast	Production Company	Ref.
M A Y	6	Shadi Ho To Aisi	Lal Babu Pandit	Khesari Lal Yadav; Puja Ganguly	B4U Motion Pictures	
M A Y	6	Sasura Bada Satawela	Rajkumar R. Pandey	Kajal Raghwani; Gopal Rai	Enterr10 Rangeela	
M A Y	13	Dulhaniya London Se Layenge	Rajnish Mishra	Khesari Lal Yadav; Amrapali Dubey; Grace Rhodes	Enterr10 Rangeela	
M A Y	13	LoveVivah.Com	Ananjay Raghuraj	Amrapali Dubey	Worldwide Records Bhojpuri	
M A Y	13	Ran	Chandra Pant	Kajal Raghwani	Worldwide Records Bhojpuri	
M A Y	28	Mera Bharat Mahan	Devendra Tiwari	Ravi Kishan; Pawan Singh; Anjana Singh	Worldwide Records Bhojpuri	
M A Y	28	Lado	Sujit Verma	Yash Kumar; Nidhi Jha		
J U N E	10	Saudagar	Anil Kabra	Hrishav Kashyap Golu		
J U N E	17	Narsimha	Sujit Kumar	Prince Singh Rajput; Nidhi Jha		
J U N E	17	Shiva Ka Shurya	Subba Rao Gosansi	Shiva Kantimani; Pakkhi Hegde	Shree Gauri Production	
J U N E	24	Umas	Manoj Kumar Rajbhar	Rakesh Gupta	Meera Films Creation	

== July–September ==
Opening		Title	Director	Cast	Production Company	Ref.
J U L Y	15	Paper Boy	Dhiru Yadav	Ritesh Pandey; Chandani Singh	Vaishali Motion Pictures	
J U L Y	15	Mujhe Kuchh Kehna Hai	Ananjay Raghuraj	Pradeep Pandey; Kajal Raghwani; Shweta Mahara	Renu Vijay Films Entertainment	
A U G U S T	5	Rowdy Inspector	Shankar	Khesari Lal Yadav; Meghashree	Mahankali Movies	
S E P T E M B E R	2	Doli Saja Ke Rakhna	Rajnish Mishra	Khesari Lal Yadav; Amrapali Dubey		
S E P T E M B E R	17	Saajan	Ishtaque Shaikh Bunty	Paresh Lal Yadav; Amrapali Dubey		
S E P T E M B E R	23	Naach Baiju Naach	Lal Vijay Shahdeo	Dinesh Lal Yadav "Nirahua"		
S E P T E M B E R	30	Dharma	Arvind Chaubey	Pawan Singh; Kajal Raghwani; Sayaji Shinde		

== October–December ==
Opening		Title	Director	Cast	Production Company	Ref.
O C T O B E R	24	Bol Radha Bol	Parag Patil	Khesari Lal Yadav; Meghasri; Pappu Yadav	Sanware Films	
O C T O B E R	28	Hamar Swabhiman	Chandra Bhushan Mani	Pawan Singh; Anjana Singh		
N O V E M B E R	4	Ek Chhaila Chhah Laila	Rajneesh Tyagi	Raju Singh; Joya Khan	Priyadarshanam Production	
N O V E M B E R	11	Jeena Teri Gali Me	Baljeet Singh	Mani Bhattacharya; Pradeep Pandey	Rajdev Films	
D E C E M B E R	9	Raja Ki Aayegi Baraat		Khesari Lal Yadav; Sudhiksha Jha		
D E C E M B E R	26	Mental Aashiq	Anupam Shah	Vishal Singh, Ritu Singh		
D E C E M B E R	30	Rowdy Rocky	Ramna Mogli	Mani Bhattacharya; Pradeep Pandey		
