= List of Bhojpuri films of 2021 =

These are the list of Bhojpuri language films that are scheduled to release in 2021.

== 2021 ==
Key
†	Denotes films that have not yet been released

Release date	Film	Cast	Director
14 January 2021	Dulhan Wahi Jo Piya Man Bhaye	Khesari Lal Yadav; Madhu Sharma; Kajal Raghwani	Rajnish Mishra
12 February 2021	Vinashak	Samar Singh; Anjana Singh; Sanjay Pandey	Mithai Lal Yadav
19 February 2021	Ghatak	Pawan Singh; Sahar Afsha; Tinu Verma	Tinu Verma
26 February 2021	Premgeet	Pradeep Pandey; Yamini Singh	Sonu Khatri
5 March 2021	Pyar To Hona Hi Tha	Arvind Akela Kallu; Yamini Singh	Pramod Shastri
19 March 2021	Seeta Aur Geeta	Arvind Akela Kallu; Kajal Yadav	Sushil Kumar Upadhyay
19 March 2021	Shubh Vivah	Pramod Premi Yadav; Chandni Singh	Anand Singh
29 March 2021	Saiyan Arab Gaile Na	Khesari Lal Yadav; Kajal Raghwani; Shubhi Sharma	Premanshu Singh
29 March 2021	Romeo Raja	Dinesh Lal Yadav; Amrapali Dubey	Manoj Narayana
2021	Bansi Birju†	Pravesh Lal Yadav; Aditya Ozha; Chandni Singh	

== January–March ==
Opening		Title	Director	Cast	Production Company	Ref.
J A N U A R Y	14	Dulhan Wahi Jo Piya Man Bhaye	Rajnish Mishra	Khesari Lal Yadav; Kajal Raghwani; Madhu Sharma		
