= Bhojpuri Film Awards =

Bhojpuri Film Award

- Awarded for: Bhojpuri Film
- Country: India
- Presented by: AB5 Multimedia and Wave Multimedia
- First award: 2005
- Website: bhojpurifilmawards.com

The Bhojpuri Film Awards recognize the best of Bhojpuri cinema. The awards have been presented annually since 2005.

== 1st Bhojpuri Film Awards ==
In 2005, the following awards were presented:

- Best Actress: Nagma (Dulha Milal Dildar)
- Best Director: Ranjan Kumar Singh (Firangi Dulhiniya)
- Best Singer Male: Manoj Tiwari (Bandhan Tute Na)
- Best Negative Male: Tinu Verma (Dharti Putra)
- Best Film: Ganga Mile Sagar Se
- Best Actor: Ravi Kishan (Panditji bataai na biyah kab hoyee)
- Best Negative Female: Upasana Singh (Bandhan Tute na)
- Best Supporting Male: Kunal Singh (Panditji bataai na biyah kab hoyee)
- Best Supporting Female: Rinku (Ghar Duar)
- Best Comedian: Ashok Saraf (Mayee ke Bitwa)
- Best Music Director: Nikhil-Vinay (Kab hoyee Gawanawa hamaar)
- Best Singer Female: Deepa Narayan (Ganga Mile Sagar Se)
- Best Story: Ranjan Kumar Singh (Firangi Dulhiniya)
- Best Screenplay: Keshav Rathod (Kab Hoi Gawanawa Hamaar)
- Best Lyricist: Vinay Bihari (Panditji bataai na biyah kab hoyee)
- Best Dialogue: Vinay Bihari (Bandhan Tute Na)
- Best Fightmaster: Tinu Verma (Dharati Putra)
- Best Editor: Asif Khan (Mayee re kar de Bidai Hamaar)
- Best Choreographer: Ram Dewan (Mayee re kar de Bidai Hamaar)
- Best Cinematographer: B. Shauqat (Mayee re kar de Bidai Hamaar)
- Best Art Director: Anjani Tiwari (Ganga Mile Sagar Se)
- Best Publicity Designer: Narsu (Panditji bataai na biyah kab hoyee)
- Lifetime Achievement Award: Kumkum
- Special Award: Udit Narayan
- Special Award: Rani Chatterjee

== 2nd Bhojpuri Film Awards ==
In 2006, the following awards were presented:

- Best Film: Deepak Sawant (Ganga)
- Best Actor: Ravi Kishan (Pandit)
- Best Actress: Nagma (Ganga)
- Best Director: Ashlam Shekh (Dharti Kahe Pookar Ke)
- Best Singer (Male): Udit Narayan (Kanhaiya)
- Best Negative Male: Tinu Verma (Raja Thakur)
- Best Negative Female: Upasana Singh (Uthaile Ghunghta Chand Dekh Le)
- Best Supporting Male: Shatrughan Sinha (Raja Thakur)
- Best Supporting Female: Rati Agnihotri (Kanhaiya)
- Best Comedian: Anand Mohan (Pyar ke Bandhan)
- Best Music Director: Dhananjai Mishra (Pyar Ke Bandhan)
- Best Singer (Female): Pamela Jain (Toha Se Pyar Ba)
- Best Story: Vinay Bihari (Pyar Ke Bandhan)
- Best Screenplay: Manoj Hansraj (Pandit)
- Best Dialogue: Shanti Bhusan (Sathi Sanghati)
- Best Lyricist: Vinay Bihari (Pyar Ke Bandhan)
- Best Editor: Manoj Shakla (Pandit)
- Best Fightmaster: Tinnu Varma (Pandit)
- Best Choreographer: Pappu Khanna (Pyar Ke Bandhan)
- Best Cinematographer: Gyan Sahaye (Bairi Piya)
- Best Art Director: Ananjani Tiwari (Kanhaiya)
- Best Publicity Designer: Narsu (Raja Thakur)
- Best Newcomer (Male): Abhay Kumar (Saiya Sipahiya)
- Best Newcomer (Female): Lata (Hamri Bhi Aavegi Barat)
- Best National Integrate: Abhay Sinha (Pyar ke Bandhan)
- Bhagwati Prasad Gupta Award: Mohanji Prasad
- Lifetime Achievement: Madhuri Mishra

== 3rd Bhojpuri Film Awards ==
In 2007, the following awards were presented:

- Best Film: Raaj Israni (Shrimaan Driver Babu)
- Best Director: K. D.(Shrimaan Driver Babu)
- Best Actor: Ravi Kishan (Pandav)
- Best Actress: Urvashi Dolakia (Saas Rani Bahoo Naikrani)
- Best Singer (Male): Dineshlal Nirahu (Kahan Jaeba Raja Najaria Ladae Ke)
- Best Singer (Female): Kalpana Patowary (UP Bihar Mumbai Express)
- Best Negative Male: Abdhesh Mishra (Kahan Jaeba Raja Najaria Ladae Ke)
- Best Negative Female: Roshan Khan (Bhojpuria Bhaiya)
- Best Supporting Male: Kunal Singh (Hamara Se Biyah Karba)
- Best Supporting Female: Konikalal (Mati)
- Best Comedian: Manoj Tiger (Nirahua Rikshawala)
- Best Music Director: Rajesh Gupta (Kab Kahba Tu "I Love You")
- Best Story: Shridhar Shetty (Hamara Se Biyah Karba)
- Best Screenplay: Nabab Arzoo (Sasurari Zindabad)
- Best Dialogue: Amit Jha (Mati)
- Best Lyricist: Vinay Bihari (Kahan Jaeba Raja Najaria Ladae Ke)
- Best Editor: Nabendu Sharma (Tu Hamar Hau)
- Best Fightmaster: Heera Singh (Janam Janam Ke Sath)
- Best Choreographer: Pappu Khanna (Tu Hamar Hau)
- Best Cinematographer: Heera Saroj (Hamar Saiya Hindustani)
- Best Art Director: Vijay Das (Kahan Jaeba Raja Najaria Ladae Ke)
- Best Publicity Designer: Ashok Mehta (Londonwali Se Nehiya Lagawli)
- Best Newcomer (Male): Sudip Pandey (Bhojpuria Bhaiya)
- Best Newcomer (Female): Pratibha Pandey (Hamara Se Biyah Karba)
- Best National Integrate: Rajendra Patel (Londonwali Se Nehiya Lagawli)
- Best Dancer: Sambhavna Seth (Hanuman Bhakt Hawaldar)
- Vishwanath Prasad Sahabadi Award: T-Series
- Lifetime Achievement Award: Sujit Kumar

== 4th Bhojpuri Film Awards ==
In 2008, the following awards were presented:

- Best Director: Aslam Shekh (Bidaai)
- Best Film: Chandrashekhar Rao and Istiyan Shekh (Bidaai)
- Best Actor: Ravi Kishan (Dharam-Veer)
- Best Actress: Rinku Ghosh (Bidaai)
- Best Negative Male: Shailendra Shrivastav (Ye Bhauji Ke Sister)
- Best Negative Female: Upasana Singh (Mai Ta Bas Mai Badi)
- Best Newcomer (Male): Ajay Dikshit (Betba Bahubali)
- Best Newcomer (Female): Kalpana Shah (Jogiji Dhire Dhire)
- Best Comedian: Manoj Tiger (Lagal Raha Ye Rajaji)
- Best Supporting Male: Sikandar Kharbanda (Gabbar Singh)
- Best Supporting Female: Geeta Tyagi (Ye Bhauji Ke Sister)
- Best Singer (Male): Kumar Sanu (Vidhata [photaua se])
- Best Singer (Female): Indu Sonali (Ye Balam Pardeshi [Nazar Bhar Dekh Le])
- Best Music Director: Dhananjay Mishra (Hum Bahubali [Prem ke rog])
- Best Lyricist: Siddharth Priyadarshi, Kari humra se tani Pyar) ( Hum Bahubali )
- Best Story: Asalam Shekh (Bidaai)
- Best Screenplay: Ashalam Shekh (Bidaai)
- Best Dialogue: Surendra Mishra (Bidaai)
- Best Fightmaster: Shakil Shekh (Vidhata)
- Best Editor: Jitendra Singh Jitu (Nirahua Chalal Sasural)
- Best Dancer: Seema Singh (Jogiji Dhire Dhire [Ye Sakhi])
- Best Choreographer: Pappu Khanna (Hum Bahubali)
- Best Cinematographer: Karim Khatri (Mai Ta Bas Mai Badi)
- Best Art Director: Anjani Tiwari (Mai Ta Bas Mai Badi)
- Best Publicity Designer: Narsu [Shakti Art] (Hum Bahubali)
- Best National Integrate: R.K. Agrawal and Barkha D. Singh (Ye Bhauji Ke Sister)
- Lifetime Achievement Award: Rakesh Pandey
- Bhagwati Prasad Gupta: Venus Records and Tapes

== 5th Bhojpuri Film Awards ==
In 2009, the following awards were presented:

- Best Publicity Designer: Creative Art - Ashok Mehta (Dahakela Jiara Hamar)
- Best Art Director: Samir (Aapan Mati Aapan Desh)
- Best Action Director: Riyaz Sultan (Aapan Mati Aapan Desh)
- Best Cinematographer: Akram Khan (Bhoomiputra)
- Best Editor: Jitu (Diwaana)
- National Integration: Bhoomiputra (A. M. Khan)
- Best Debut (Female): Subhi Sharma (Chhalani Ke Chhalal Dulha)
- Best Debut (Male): Ashish Gupta (Umaria Kaili Tohare Naam)
- Best Supporting Female: Bandani Mishra (Diwaana)
- Best Supporting Male: Sudesh Bedi (Aapan Mati Aaapan Desh)
- Best Item Dance: Seema Singh (Tohar Naikhe Kauno Jod Tu Bejod Badu Ho "Aaglage Mod Es Jawani Men")
- Best Choreographer: Rikki Gupta (Tohar Naikhe Kauno Jod Tu Bejod Badu Ho "Aaglage Mod Es Jawani Men")
- Best Story: S.K. Chauhan (Aapan Mati Aapan Desh)
- Best Screenplay: Aslam Shekh (Pariwaar)
- Best Dialogue: Heri Fernandish (Bhoomiputra)
- Best Lyricist: Vinay Bihari (Umaria Kaili Tohare Naam "Tan Ganga man prem ki")
- Best Singer (Female): Lata Mangeshkar (Umaria Kaili Tohare Naam "Tan Ganga man prem ki")
- Best Singer (Male): Udit Narayan (Umaria Kaili Tohre Naam "Phool ban ke chaman men")
- Best Music: Ram Laxman (Umaria Kaili Tohare Naam "Tan Ganga man prem ki")
- Best Comedian: Mustaq Khan (Bhoomiputra)
- Best Negative Female: Rani Singh (Sajana Sajaida Mang)
- Best Negative Male: Awadhesh Mishra (Odania Kamal Kade)
- Best Film: Pariwaar (Abhay Sinha and Ajay Sinha)
- Best Director: Aslam Shekh (Pariwaar)
- Best Actress: Pakhi Hegde (Pariwaar)
- Best Actor: Ravi Kishan (Bhoomiputra)
- Vishwanath Prasad Shahabadi Lifetime Achievement Award: Jaishree T
- Bhagavati Prasad Gupta Special Award: Durga Prasad
- Jury Mention Award: Pradeep Pandey (Diwaana)

== 6th Bhojpuri Film Awards ==
In 2010, the following awards were presented:

- Lifetime Achievement Award: Vijay Khare
- Special Award: Nathu Bhai Gandhi
- Bhagwati Prasad Special Award: P. K. Tiwari (MD Mahuwa Channel)
- Jury Mention Award: Ranbhoomi (Abhay Sinha)
- Vishesh Patrakarita Puraskar: (Prashant Ujwal)
- National Integration: Najariya Tohse Lagi
- Best Actor: Dinesh Lal Yadav (Ranbhoomi)
- Best Actress: Rani Chatterjee (Devra Bada Satavela)
- Best Director: Anil Ajitabh (Ranbhoomi)
- Best Film: Ranbhoomi (Abhay Sinha)
- Best Choreographer: Kanu Mukherjee (Devra Bada Satavela)
- Best Singer (Male): Pawan Singh (Hamra Maati Mein Dum Baa)
- Best Singer (Female): Richa Sharma (Ranbhoomi)
- Best Item Dance: Sambhavna Seth (Ranbhoomi)
- Best Music: Madhukar Anand (Devra Bada Satavela)
- Best Lyricist: Rajkumar Pandey and Shyam Dehati (Devra Bada Satavela)
- Best Supporting Actor: Kunal Singh (Dil)
- Best Supporting Actress: Neelima Singh (Aaj Ke Karan Arjun)
- Best Negative (Male): Abdhesh Mishra (Dil)
- Best Comedian: Manoj Tiger
- Best Debut (Male): Manoj Pandye (Lahariya Luta Ye Raja Ji)
- Best Debut (Female): Bibhuti Triwedi (Najariya Tohse Lagi)
- Best Dialogue: Bhushan Shrivashtava
- Best Screenplay: Anil Ajitabh
- Best Story: M I Raj (Dil)
- Best Cinematographer: Damodar Naidu (Ranbhoomi)
- Best Sound: Ranbhoomi
- Best Editor: Harish Chaudhary (Ranbhoomi)
- Best Action: R. P. Yadav (Aaj Ka Karan Arjun)
- Best Art Director: Abdhesh Shravan (Dil)

== 7th Bhojpuri Film Awards ==
In 2011, the following awards were presented:

- Lifetime Achievement Award:
- Special Award:
- Special Award:
- Jury Mention Award:
- Vishesh Patrakarita Puraskar:
- National Integration:
- Best Actor:
- Best Actress:
- Best Director:
- Best Film:
- Best Choreographer:
- Best Singer (Male):
- Best Singer (Female):
- Best Item Dance:
- Best Music:
- Best Lyricist:
- Best Supporting Actor:
- Best Supporting Actress:
- Best Negative (Male):
- Best Comedian:
- Best Debut (Male):
- Best Debut (Female):
- Best Dialogue:
- Best Screenplay:
- Best Story:
- Best Cinematographer:
- Best Sound:
- Best Editor:
- Best Action:
- Best Art Director:

== 8th Bhojpuri Film Awards ==
In 2012, the following awards were presented:

- Lifetime Achievement Award:
- Special Award:
- Special Award:
- Jury Mention Award:
- Vishesh Patrakarita Puraskar:
- National Integration:
- Best Actor:
- Best Actress:
- Best Director:
- Best Film:
- Best Choreographer:
- Best Singer (Male):
- Best Singer (Female):
- Best Item Dance:
- Best Music:
- Best Lyricist:
- Best Supporting Actor:
- Best Supporting Actress:
- Best Negative (Male):
- Best Comedian:
- Best Debut (Male):
- Best Debut (Female):
- Best Dialogue:
- Best Screenplay:
- Best Story:
- Best Cinematographer:
- Best Sound:
- Best Editor:
- Best Action:
- Best Art Director:

== 9th Bhojpuri Film Awards ==
In 2013, the following awards were presented:

- Lifetime Achievement Award:
- Special Award:
- Special Award:
- Jury Mention Award:
- Vishesh Patrakarita Puraskar:
- National Integration:
- Best Actor:
- Best Actress:
- Best Director:
- Best Film:
- Best Choreographer:
- Best Singer (Male):
- Best Singer (Female):
- Best Item Dance:
- Best Music:
- Best Lyricist:
- Best Supporting Actor:
- Best Supporting Actress:
- Best Negative (Male):
- Best Comedian:
- Best Debut (Male):
- Best Debut (Female):
- Best Dialogue:
- Best Screenplay:
- Best Story:
- Best Cinematographer:
- Best Sound:
- Best Editor:
- Best Action:
- Best Art Director:

== 10th Bhojpuri Film Awards ==
In 2014, the following awards were presented:

- Lifetime Achievement Award:
- Special Award:
- Special Award:
- Jury Mention Award:
- Vishesh Patrakarita Puraskar:
- National Integration:
- Best Actor:
- Best Actress:
- Best Director:
- Best Film:
- Best Choreographer:
- Best Singer (Male):
- Best Singer (Female):
- Best Item Dance:
- Best Music:
- Best Lyricist:
- Best Supporting Actor:
- Best Supporting Actress:
- Best Negative (Male):
- Best Comedian:
- Best Debut (Male):
- Best Debut (Female):
- Best Dialogue:
- Best Screenplay:
- Best Story:
- Best Cinematographer:
- Best Sound:
- Best Editor:
- Best Action:
- Best Art Director:

== 11th Bhojpuri Film Awards ==
In 2015, the following awards were presented:

- Lifetime Achievement Award:
- Special Award:
- Special Award:
- Jury Mention Award:
- Vishesh Patrakarita Puraskar:
- National Integration:
- Best Actor:
- Best Actress:
- Best Director:
- Best Film:
- Best Choreographer:
- Best Singer (Male):
- Best Singer (Female):
- Best Item Dance:
- Best Music:
- Best Lyricist:
- Best Supporting Actor:
- Best Supporting Actress:
- Best Negative (Male):
- Best Comedian:
- Best Debut (Male):
- Best Debut (Female):
- Best Dialogue:
- Best Screenplay:
- Best Story:
- Best Cinematographer:
- Best Sound:
- Best Editor:
- Best Action:
- Best Art Director:

== 12th Bhojpuri Film Awards ==
In 2016, the following awards were presented:

- Lifetime Achievement Award:
- Special Award:
- Special Award:
- Jury Mention Award:
- Vishesh Patrakarita Puraskar:
- National Integration:
- Best Actor:
- Best Actress:
- Best Director:
- Best Film:
- Best Choreographer:
- Best Singer (Male):
- Best Singer (Female):
- Best Item Dance:
- Best Music:
- Best Lyricist:
- Best Supporting Actor:
- Best Supporting Actress:
- Best Negative (Male):
- Best Comedian:
- Best Debut (Male):
- Best Debut (Female):
- Best Dialogue:
- Best Screenplay:
- Best Story:
- Best Cinematographer:
- Best Sound:
- Best Editor:
- Best Action:
- Best Art Director:

== 13th Bhojpuri Film Awards ==
In 2017, the following awards were presented:

- Lifetime Achievement Award:
- Special Award:
- Special Award:
- Jury Mention Award:
- Vishesh Patrakarita Puraskar:
- National Integration:
- Best Actor:
- Best Actress:
- Best Director:
- Best Film:
- Best Choreographer:
- Best Singer (Male):
- Best Singer (Female):
- Best Item Dance:
- Best Music:
- Best Lyricist:
- Best Supporting Actor:
- Best Supporting Actress:
- Best Negative (Male):
- Best Comedian:
- Best Debut (Male):
- Best Debut (Female):
- Best Dialogue:
- Best Screenplay:
- Best Story:
- Best Cinematographer:
- Best Sound:
- Best Editor:
- Best Action:
- Best Art Director:

== 14th Bhojpuri Film Awards ==
In 2018, the following awards were presented:

- Lifetime Achievement Award:
- Special Award:
- Special Award:
- Jury Mention Award:
- Vishesh Patrakarita Puraskar:
- National Integration:
- Best Actor:
- Best Actress:
- Best Director:
- Best Film:
- Best Choreographer:
- Best Singer (Male):
- Best Singer (Female):
- Best Item Dance:
- Best Music:
- Best Lyricist:
- Best Supporting Actor:
- Best Supporting Actress:
- Best Negative (Male):
- Best Comedian:
- Best Debut (Male):
- Best Debut (Female):
- Best Dialogue:
- Best Screenplay:
- Best Story:
- Best Cinematographer:
- Best Sound:
- Best Editor:
- Best Action:
- Best Art Director:

== 15th Bhojpuri Film Awards ==
In 2019, the following awards were presented:

- Lifetime Achievement Award:
- Special Award:
- Special Award:
- Jury Mention Award:
- Vishesh Patrakarita Puraskar:
- National Integration:
- Best Actor:
- Best Actress:
- Best Director:
- Best Film:
- Best Choreographer:
- Best Singer (Male):
- Best Singer (Female):
- Best Item Dance:
- Best Music:
- Best Lyricist:
- Best Supporting Actor:
- Best Supporting Actress:
- Best Negative (Male):
- Best Comedian:
- Best Debut (Male):
- Best Debut (Female):
- Best Dialogue:
- Best Screenplay:
- Best Story:
- Best Cinematographer:
- Best Sound:
- Best Editor:
- Best Action:
- Best Art Director:

== 16th and 17th Bhojpuri Film Awards ==
In 22, the following awards were presented: 16th Bhojpuri Film Awards

- Lifetime Achievement Award:
- Special Award:
- Special Award:
- Jury Mention Award: Gautam Singh (Chhaliya)
- Vishesh Patrakarita Puraskar:
- National Integration:
- Best Actor: Dinesh Lal Yadav (Sher E Hindustan)
- Best Actress: Amrapali Dubey (Lagal Raha Batasa)
- Best Director: Pramod Shastri (Chhaliya)
- Best Film: Deepak Shah (Bitiya Chhathi Mai Ke)
- Best Choreographer: Sanjay Korve (Jai Hind)
- Best Singer (Male): Pawan Singh (Jai Hind)
- Best Singer (Female): Priyanka Singh (Chhaliya)
- Best Item Dance: Producer is Details Not Submitted (Raj Tilak)
- Best Music: Dhananjay Mishra (Bitiya Chhathi Mai Ke)
- Best Lyricist: Pyarelal Yadav (Bitiya Chhathi Mai Ke)
- Best Supporting Actor: Amit Shukla (Bitiya Chhathi Mai Ke)
- Best Supporting Actress: Maya Yadav (Kajal)
- Best Negative Role: Sanjay Pandey (Raj Tilak)
- Best Comedian: Anand Mohan (Raj Tilak)
- Best Debut (Male): Harshit Murthy (Kajal)
- Best Debut (Female):
- Best Dialogue: Manoj Narayan (Sher E Hindustan)
- Best Screenplay: Firoj Khan & Rakesh Tripathi (Jai Hind)
- Best Story: Manoj Singh Tiger (Lagal Raha Batasa)
- Best Cinematographer: R.R Prince (Lallu Ki Laila)
- Best Audiographer: Krishna Kumar Vishwakarma (Lallu Ki Laila)
- Best Editor: Gul Mohammad Ansari (Chhaliya)
- Best Action: Hira Yadav (Raj Tilak)
- Best Art Director: Manish Shirke & Nazir Sheikh (Lallu Ki Laila)
- Best Film Social Issue: Sanjeev Kushwaha (Lagal Raha Batasa)
- Best Publicity Design: Narsu (Jai Hind)
- Best Popular Actress: Kajal Yadav
- Best Popular Actor: Yash Kumarr
- Best Popular Film: Abhay Sinha (Boss)

In 22, the following awards were presented: 17th Bhojpuri Film Awards

- Lifetime Achievement Award:
- Special Award:
- Special Award:
- Jury Mention Award: Ratnakar Kumar (Babul)
- Vishesh Patrakarita Puraskar:
- National Integration:
- Best Actor: Pradeep Pandey'Chintu' (Ye Kahani Hai Laila Majnu Ki)
- Best Actress: Kajal Ragwani (Dulhan Wahi Jo Piya Man Bhaye)
- Best Director: Rajnish Mishra (Dulhan Wahi Jo Piya Man Bhaye)
- Best Film: Abhaya Sinha (Dulhan Wahi Jo Piya Man Bhaye)
- Best Choreographer: Ricky Gupta (Mehadi Laga Ke Rakhna 3)
- Best Singer (Male): Khesari Lal Yadav (Mehadi Laga Ke Rakhna 3)
- Best Singer (Female): Swati Sharma (Litti Chokha)
- Best Item Dance: Sabha Khan (Litti Chokha)
- Best Music: Rajkumar R Pandey & Pramod Gupta (Ye Kahani Hai Laila Majnu Ki)
- Best Lyricist: Let Shyam Dehati (Ye Kahani Hai Laila Majnu Ki)
- Best Supporting Actor: Shailendra Srivastav (Ye Kahani Hai Laila Majnu Ki)
- Best Supporting Actress: Madhu Sharma (Dulhan Wahi Jo Piya Man Bhaye)
- Best Negative Role: Dev Singh (Kasam Paida Karne Vale Ki 2)
- Best Comedian: Samarth Chaturvedi (Pyar To Hona Hi Tha 3)
- Best Debut (Male):
- Best Debut (Female): Sahar Afsha (Mehadi Laga Ke Rakhna 3)
- Best Dialogue: S.K Chauhan (Pyar To Hona Hi Tha 3)
- Best Screenplay: Ishtiyaque Shaikh 'Bunty' (Mera Watan)
- Best Story: Awdhesh Mishra (Babul)
- Best Cinematographer: Jagminder Singh Hundal (Babul)
- Best Audiographer: Producer is Details Not Submitted (Seeta Aur Geeta)
- Best Editor: Gurjent Singh (Pawan Putra)
- Best Action: Tinu Varma (Ghatak)
- Best Art Director: Shera (Pawan Putra)
- Best Film Social Issue: Ratnakar Kumar (Babul)
- Best Publicity Design: Global Dishk 'Ajay Shaw' (Lal Ishq)
- Best Popular Actress: Akshara Singh
- Best Popular Actor: Arvind Akela 'Kallu'
- Best Popular Film: Prem Rai (Boss)

== 18th Bhojpuri Film Awards ==
In 2023, the following awards were presented:

- Lifetime Achievement Award: Madhu Mishra
- Special Award: Nishant Ujjwal (Contribution to Bhojpuri Cinema)
- Special Award: Ramesh Semlani (18th Years Support Bhojpuri Film Awards Continue)
- Special Award: Rani Chattarjee (18th Years Support Bhojpuri Film Awards Continue)
- Special Award: Sambhavna Seth (18th Years Support Bhojpuri Film Awards Continue)
- Special Award: Pooja Vikas (Journalist)
- Special Award: Vidya Maurya (Fashion Designer)
- Special Award: Ranjan Sinha (PRO)
- Special Award: Munna Yadav (Spot Boy)
- Jury Mention Award: Yash Kumarr (Dandnayak)
- Vishesh Patrakarita Puraskar:
- National Integration:
- Best Actor: Global Dishk 'Ajay Shaw' (Lal Ishq)
- Best Actress: Amrapali Dubey (Aashiqui)
- Best Director: Pramod Shastri (Aan Baan Shaan)
- Best Film: Ajay Gupta, Vinod Kumar Gupta (Aan Baan Shaan)
- Best Choreographer: Kanu Mukherjee (Bol Radha Bol)
- Best Singer (Male): Arvind Akela 'Kallu' (Aan Baan Shaan)
- Best Singer (Female): Priyanka Singh (Doli Saja Ke Rakhna)
- Best Best Special Song: Kajal Singh (Dandnayak)
- Best Music: Rajnish Mishra, Chhote Baba, Arya Sharma (Doli Saja Ke Rakhna)
- Best Lyricist: Sumit Singh Chandravanshi (Doli Saja Ke Rakhna)
- Best Supporting Actor: Kunal Singh (Aashiqui)
- Best Supporting Actress: Maya Yadav (Mere Meet Re)
- Best Negative Role: Shailendra Srivastava (Aan Baan Shaan)
- Best Comedian: Sanjay Mahanand (Dulhaniya London Se Layenge)
- Best Debut (Male): Raja Guru (Aan Baan Shaan)
- Best Debut (Female):
- Best Dialogue: S.K. Chouhan (Dandnayak)
- Best Screenplay: Indrajeet Kumar (Nandini)
- Best Story: Satendra Singh (Maa Ka Aanchal)
- Best Cinematographer: Mahi Sherla (Nandini)
- Best Audiographer: Ashok Yadav & Anuj (Aardhnari)
- Best Editor: Prakash Jha (Aan Baan Shaan)
- Best Action: Dillip Yadav (Bol Radha Bol)
- Best Art Director:
- Best Film Social Issue: Neelabh Tiwari & Anjani Tiwari and Sandeep Singh (Maa Ka Aanchal)
- Best Publicity Design: Narsu (Jaanwar aur Insaan)
- Best Popular Actress: Anjana Singh
- Best Popular Actor: Dinesh Lal Yadav 'Nirahua'
- Best Popular Film: Abhay Sinha (Dulhaniya London Se Layenge)

== 19th Bhojpuri Film Awards ==
In 2024, the following awards were presented:

- Lifetime Achievement Award:
- Special Award:
- Special Award:
- Jury Mention Award:
- Vishesh Patrakarita Puraskar:
- National Integration:
- Best Actor:
- Best Actress:
- Best Director:
- Best Film:
- Best Choreographer:
- Best Singer (Male):
- Best Singer (Female):
- Best Item Dance:
- Best Music:
- Best Lyricist:
- Best Supporting Actor:
- Best Supporting Actress:
- Best Negative (Male):
- Best Comedian:
- Best Debut (Male):
- Best Debut (Female):
- Best Dialogue:
- Best Screenplay:
- Best Story:
- Best Cinematographer:
- Best Sound:
- Best Editor:
- Best Action:
- Best Art Director:

== See also ==
- Bhojpuri cinema
- Cinema of Bihar
- List of Bhojpuri films
