= List of Bhojpuri film awards =

This is a list of awards from Bhojpuri cinema.

== List ==
- Bhojpuri Film Awards
- Sabrang Film Awards
- International Bhojpuri Film Awards

== See also ==
- List of Bhojpuri films
