= Nirahua Hindustani 3 =

Bhojpuri Film

- Theatrical Release Poster
- Directed by: Manjul Thakur
- Written by: Arvind Tiwari
- Screenplay by: Arvind Tiwari; Manjul Thakur
- Story by: Manjul Thakur
- Produced by: Pravesh Lal Yadav
- Starring: Dinesh Lal Yadav; Amrapali Dubey; Shubhi Sharma; Sanjay Pandey; Samarth Chaturvedi
- Cinematography: Siddharth Singh
- Edited by: Jitendra Singh (Jeetu)
- Music by: Aslam Surty
- Production company: Nirahua Entertainment Pvt Ltd
- Distributed by: Nirahua Music World
- Release dates: 16 November 2018 (Bihar); 21 December 2018 (Mumbai)
- Running time: 163 minutes
- Country: India
- Language: Bhojpuri

Nirahua Hindustani 3 is a 2018 Indian Bhojpuri-language action romance comedy film directed by Manjul Thakur and produced by Pravesh Lal Yadav under banner of "Nirahua Entertainment Pvt Ltd". Dinesh Lal Yadav in leading role along with Amrapali Dubey and Shubhi Sharma. Sanjay Pandey, Kiran Yadav, Samarth Chaturvedi, Ashish Shendre, Pallavi Koli, Oshin Kamboj, Samarth Chaturvedi, Ritu Pandey, Shweta Verma and Sanjay Mahanand feature in supporting roles.

This is the third film of the "Nirahua Hindustani" series, along with "Nirahua Hindustani" and "Nirahua Hindustani 2". This is the first franchise in the history of Bhojpuri cinema to have a third installment. The film's music was composed by Rajnish Mishra with lyrics by Pyare Lal, Shyam Dehati and Azad Singh.

== Plot ==
The story begins from Mumbai where Nirahua comes in search of her dream queen. Where he meets a struggling actress Sona, who sees Sona as her dream queen. But Sona does not like Nirahua, she has a dream to become a big actress. That is why he quarrels with his mother and father and his parents stop sending him the expenses. So she goes an office for job but only married people are given jobs there, for which Sona gets a fake wedding card printed from a studio and the photographer accidentally prints Nirahua's photo on the card. Sona starts the job by showing that card in her office. One day Sona's friend Tanu sells some remaining cards with useless newspapers. After seeing the card Nirahua reaches his office to meet Sona. But one day the owner of the company learns of Sona's forgery and he removes Sona from the job. Sona does not even have the money to pay rent the house, due to which the landlord vacates the house. In this difficult time, Nirahua supports Sona, Sona also starts living in relationship with Nirahua. But one day Nirahua's father discovers this and goes to Mumbai to meet Nirahua. Nirahua requests Sona to be a cultured daughter-in-law in front of her father but Sona refuses this. then Nirahua hire a wife on rent his named Champa.

Nirahua's father likes Champa very much and goes to her village with Nirahua and Champa, where he arranged Nirahua and Champa married again. Champa takes money from Nirahua for all these tasks, but Champa gradually falls in love with Nirahua for her goodness. At the same time, in Mumbai Sona also gets a film and goes to meet the producer with the director, where the producer asks Sona to do the sacrifice instead of giving the role, which she refuses this. And she realizes her mistake and she goes to Nirahua's village to marry him. Nirahua is happy to see Sona and tells Champa to go back to Mumbai. Which Champa refuses and says that I accept it was all a drama but the marriage between her and Nirahua is not a drama. But Nirahua refused to accept Champa as his wife. Then Champa says that she was married in the presence of all the villagers, and just saying no does not break it. Her divorce should also be done with all the customs, then the divorce of Nirahua and Champa is organized in front of all the villagers. Where Pandit frees Nirahua from all the seventh truths and says that the biggest adornment of Suhagan woman is Mangalasutra of her neck and there is vermilion in the hair. And Nirhua takes Mangalasutra from Champa's throat. When Pandit asks to Nirahua for wash the vermilion of Champa's hair, his hands tremble and he says that I can break all the seventh truths but cannot wash a suhagan's hair's vermilion. Finally Nirahua accepts Champa as his wife instead of Sona.

== Cast ==
- Dinesh Lal Yadav as Nirahua Yadav
- Amrapali Dubey as Champa
- Shubhi Sharma as Sona Chaudhary
- Sanjay Pandey as Jharkhandey Yadav
- Kiran Yadav as Nirahua's mother
- Ashish Shendre as Nirahua's father
- Samarth Chaturvedi as Nirahua's elder brother
- Ritu Pandey as Jharkhandey's wife
- Shweta Verma as Nirahua's sister-in-law
- Pallavi Koli as Tanu (Sona's friend)
- Oshin Kamboj as Sona's friend
- Sanjay Mahanand as Kanta Jha (photographer)
- Manjul Thakur as A Customer, who bought Closeup

== Production ==
=== Filming ===
The film was shot in locations of Chhattisgarh like Koliyari village, Highway Hotel, Mittal Hotel and Fit Life Gym in Dhamtari district, Bunglow Raipur and Raipur city in Raipur district with some scenes shot in Akashwadi Jhopadpatti and Adventure Park Beach in Mumbai.

== Release ==
The film was released on 14 November 2018 on occasion of Chhath in the all theatres of Bihar and had one of the biggest openings of the year 2018 in Bhojpuri Cinema. On 21 December 2018, it also released in all theatres of Mumbai and Gujarat and emerged as one of the biggest Bhojpuri blockbusters of the year.

== Soundtrack ==
Nirahua Hindustani 3

Soundtrack album by Rajnish Mishra
- Released: 2018
- Venue: Mumbai
- Studio: Nirahua Music World
- Genre: Feature film soundtrack
- Length: 38:54
- Language: Bhojpuri
- Label: SRK Music
- Producer: Pravesh Lal Yadav

The soundtrack for "Nirahua Hindustani 3" was composed by Rajnish Mishra with lyrics written by Pyare Lal Yadav, Shyam Dehati and Azad Singh. It was produced under Nirahua's own company, the "Nirahua Music World" label.

The song "Chicken Biryani Champa Ki Jawani" was successful on YouTube. It was released on 20 October 2018 on YouTube. Within the first week, it had collected 1.5 million views.

Track listing
No.	Title	Lyrics	Singer(s)	Length
1.	"Chicken Biryani Champa Ki Jawani"	Azad Singh	Kalpana Patowary	3:29
2.	"Maar Ke Aayil Biya Itter"	Azad Singh	Dinesh Lal Yadav	3:43
3.	"Bhaag Me Lendha Likhal Ba"	Pyare Lal Yadav	Alok Kumar	4:54
4.	"Hamar Mann Ude Lagal"	Pyare Lal Yadav	Kalpana Patowary	3:16
5.	"Ja Ja Aey Sanam Harjayee"	Azad Singh	Alok Kumar	4:18
6.	"Lagata Dusara Se Pat Gailu"	Pyare Lal Yadav	Rajnish Mishra, Priyanka Singh	3:55
7.	"Maza Maare Me Turba Gahanwa"	Pyare Lal Yadav	Alok Kumar, Kalpana Patowary	3:43
8.	"Pala Me Laga Ke Kadi"	Shyam Dehati	Alok Kumar, Priyanka Singh	3:53
9.	"Hamse Biyah Kala Aish Karbu"	Azad Singh	Rajnish Mishra, Kalpana Patowary	4:17
10.	"Balamua Kaise Tejab"	Pyare Lal Yadav	Kalpana Patowary	3:26
Total length:				38:54

== Marketing ==
The first-look poster was released on producer Pravesh Lal Yadav's official Instagram account on 28 August 2018. He said the film would release in Chhath Pooja for all theatres. A teaser was released on 22 September 2018 on the official YouTube channel of "SRK Music", which also bought the satellite rights.

The trailer for the film was released on 12 October 2018 on the official YouTube Channel of "SRK Music".

The film was also streamable on YouTube on 27 March 2019 and received 10 million views in just 2 days. It also broke a record being the first in Bhojpuri Cinema to get 50 million views in just two months. Ecstatic over the good news, the lead stars of the film Aamrapali and Nirahua share da poster of the film on their respective social media handles and the film crossed over 100 million views in just one year.

== Award and nominations ==
Ceremony	Venue	Category	Recipient(s) and nominee(s)	Result	Ref.
Sabrang Film Awards 2019	Mumbai	Best Choreography	Kanu Mukharjee	Won	
Bhojpuri Cine Awards 2019	Kolkata	Best Actress	Amrapali Dubey	Won	
Bhojpuri Cine Awards 2019	Kolkata	Best Actress in Supporting Role	Subhi Sharma	Won	
International Bhojpuri Film Awards (2019)	Singapore	Best Actress in Supporting Role	Subhi Sharma	Won	
International Bhojpuri Film Awards (2019)	Singapore	Best Actor (Critics)	Dinesh Lal Yadav	Won	
