= International Bhojpuri Film Awards =

Bhojpuri Film Award

IBFA Award
- Awarded for: Excellence in cinematic achievements for Bhojpuri cinema
- Country: India
- Presented by: International Bhojpuri Film Award
- First award: 2015
- Website: www.yashifilms.com

Television/radio coverage
- Network: Zee Ganga
- Produced by: Yashi Films International

The International Bhojpuri Film Award (also known as the IBFA Awards) is a set of awards presented annually by Yashi Films International to honour the artistic and technical excellence of professionals in the Bhojpuri film industry. Instituted in 2015, the ceremony is held in a different country around the world every year. The inaugural International Bhojpuri Film Award was held in 2015 at Mauritius, followed by IBFA 2016 in Dubai, IBFA 2017 in London, IBFA 2018 Malaysia and IBFA 2019 Singapore.

IBFA 2018 Awards were given for the following categories: Best Film, Best Director, Best Actor, Best Actress, Best Supporting Actress, Best Actor in a Negative Role, Best Actor in A comic role, and Best Debut.

== IBFA ==
=== IBFA Awards 2017 ===
The third international Bhojpuri Film Awards were held in London on 16 July 2017. The actors who won in 2017 are:

- Best Act
- Best Actress - Madhu Sharma
- Best Film - Aashik Awara
- Star of the Millennium - Manoj Tiwari
- Best Actor Critics' Choice - Ravi Kishan
- Best Male Singer - Pawan Singh
- Best Actress Viewers' Choice - Anjana Singh
- Best director - Aslam Sheikh
- Abhay Sinha - Best Producer
- Kanu Mukherjee - Best Dance Director
- Seema Singh - Dancing Queen
- Arvind Akela Kallu - Best Romantic Actor
- Yash Kumar - Best Action Actor
- Nidhi Jha - Most Popular Actress
- Anara Gupta - Purvanchal Film Award
- Mohini Ghosh - Most Beautiful Actress
- Kajal Yadav - Kalaashree Samman
- Mani Bhattacharya - Best Female Debut
- Shreya Mukherjee - Kalaashree Samman
- Nisha Pandey - Sushree Samman
- Sonu Pritam - Kalashree Samman
- Vikas Singh Birappan - Kalaashree Samman
- Bharat Sharma Vyas - Bhojpuri Lokgeet Samrat
- Gopal Rai - Mahendra Mishir Samman
- Kunal Singh - Bhojpuri Mahanayak Samman
- Rakesh Shrivastav - Bhojpuri Lok Ratna
- Rahul Srivastava - Comedy King
- Ras Bihari Giri - Purvanchal Shree Samman
- Uday Bhagat - Best PRO

=== IBFA Awards 2018 ===
International Bhojpuri Film Awards 2018: Superstars From Malaysia

- Best Actor - Dinesh Lal Yadav For Nirahua Hindustani 2
- Most Popular Actor Award - Pawan Singh
- Best Actress- Anjana Singh
- Bhojpuri Dream Girl Award - Shubhi Sharma
- Dancing Queen Award - Sambhavna Seth
- Bhojpuri Personality Award - Avinash Dwivedi
- Incredible India International Bhojpuri Legend Award - Manoj Tiwari
- Best Actress Award (critics) - Amrapali Dubey
- YouTube Queen - Amrapali Dubey
- Nazir Hussain Award - Ravi Kishan
- Best Actor Negative Role - Sanjay Pandey
- Best Actor in a Comic Role - Manoj Tiger
- Most Versatile Actor - Vinay Anand
- Supporting Actor Award - Awadhesh Mishra
- Abhay Sinha — Best Producer

=== IBFA Awards 2019 ===
- Best Film – Border
- Best Director – Aslam Sheikh (Maa Tujhe Salaam)
- Best Actor in a Leading Role (Male) – Pawan Singh for Maa Tujhe Sallam
- Best Actor in a Leading Role (Female) – Kajal Raghwani for (Sangharsh)
- Best Actor in a Negative Role – Ashok Samarth for Balam Ji I Love You
- Best Actor in a Comic Role – Manoj Tiger for Halfa Macha Ke Gail
- Best Actor in a Supporting Role (Male) – Awdhesh Mishra for Sangharsh
- Best Actor in a Supporting Role (Female) – Shubhi Sharma for Nirahua Hindustani 3
- Best Singer (Male) – Pawan Singh for song Bhagwan Badi Fursat Se from Maa Tujhe Sallam
- Best Singer (Female) – Priyanka Singh for Maa Tujhe Sallam
- Best Music Director – Rajnish Mishra for song Cooler Kurti Main lga la ki cooling kart rhi from Deewanapan

== History ==
The first international ceremony for this award took place in Mauritius. The second edition was held in Dubai, and the third in London.

== See also ==
- Bhojpuri cinema
- List of Bhojpuri films
- Cinema of Bihar
