= Hero Vardiwala =

Indian film

Hero Vardiwala is an Indian, Bhojpuri-language, action crime thriller streaming television series on ALTBalaji which is based on the famous novel Vardiwala Gunda by Ved Prakash Sharma. It is the first ever web series made in Bhojpuri language. The series stars Dinesh Lal Yadav A.K.A Nirahua as the protagonist along with Amrapali Dubey.

== Cast ==
- Dinesh Lal Yadav "Nirahua"
- Amrapali Dubey
- Ritu Singh
- Sambhavna Seth

== Reception ==
According to Tarun Agarwal of The Quint, the series "clearly shows the image of real politics."
