= Sanjay Pandey =

Indian actor

- Born: Azamgarh, Uttar Pradesh, India
- Occupation: Actor
- Years active: 2001 – present
- Spouse: Ragini Pandey
- Children: Sanjana Pandey
- Parent(s): Indradev Pandey (Father), Malti Pandey (Mother)

Sanjay Pandey (born 12 March 1972) is an Indian actor mainly active in Bhojpuri films. He is famous for his negative roles in films. He has worked as main villain in several Bhojpuri films.

== Career ==
Sanjay Pandey started his career as a theater artist from Bhopal theatre.

In 2002, he made his in film acting debut as a villain in the Bhojpuri film 'Kahiya Doli Laike Aiba' directed by Rajkumar R. Pandey and his performance was highly praised by critics and audience. But after three films he stopped working in Bhojpuri and is busy in television. In 2009, Rajkumar R. Pandey approached him for a film named "Deewana" with Dinesh Lal Yadav and film was biggest hit on Bhojpuri box office.

He has worked in many blockbuster film such as Saat Saheliyan, Nirahua Hindustani, Bam Bam Bol Raha Hai Kashi, Mehandi Laga Ke Rakhna, Mai Sehra Bandh Ke Aaunga, Border and Nirahua Hindustani 3.

== Filmography ==
Key
†	Denotes films that have not yet been released

Year	Title	Role	Ref.
2002	Kahiya Doli Leke Aiba		
2004	Ghar Duwar		
2005	Nadiya Ke Teer		
2005	Ham Bal Bramhchari		
2007	Gabbar Singh		
2009	Saat Saheliyan		
2009	Deewana		
2010	Saiya Ke Sath Madaiya Me		
2010	Mrityunjay		
2011	Main Nagin Tu Nagina		
2011	Diljale		
2011	Truck Driver		
2012	Kaisan Piywa Ke Charitar Ba		
2012	Bajrang		
2012	Gajab Siti Maare Saiyan Pichware		
2012	Saugandh Ganga Maiya Ke		
2013	Jung Siyasat Ke		
2013	Dil Ta Pagal Hola		
2013	Sapoot		
2013	Jeena Teri Gali Mein		
2013	Biwi No.1		
2013	Kasam Vardi Ke		
2013	Majnu Moterwala		
2013	Tadipaar		
2013	Rajaji I Love You		
2013	Rihai		
2014	Deewangi Had Se		
2014	Nirahua Ek Sarfira		
2014	Bihari Ban Gayil Hero		
2014	Nirahua Hindustani	Bablu Yadav	
2014	Ham Ke Daru Naahi Mehraru Chaahi		
2015	Chhora Ganga Kinare Wala		
2015	Viraj Tadipaar		
2015	Balam Rasiya		
2015	Raja Babu		
2015	Vijaypath Ego Jung		
2015	Khakhi Vardiwala		
2015	Kaat Ke Rakh Deb		
2016	Yadav Paan Bhandar		
2016	The Power of Dahshat		
2016	Tu Mera Dushman		
2016	Dil Ke Karib Jab Se Aa Gailu Tu		
2016	Dhadkela Tohre Naame Karejwa		
2016	Aashik Awara		
2016	Bam Bam Bol Raha Hai Kashi	Bandook Singh	
2016	Dabang Aashiq		
2016	Ram Lakhan		
2016	Dil Hai Ki Manta Nahi		
2016	Deewane		
2016	Mahabharat		
2016	Nayanvan Ke Baan		
2016	Dilwala	Navrangi	
2017	Garam Masala		
2017	Ghus Ke Maarab		
2017	Mehandi Laga Ke Rakhna		
2017	Pahali Nazar Ko Salam		
2017	Nirahua Hindustani 2	Paras Yadav	
2017	Rang		
2017	Action Raja		
2017	Beta Hoke Ta Aisan		
2017	Ek Rajai Teen Lugai		
2017	Jila Champaran		
2017	Mai Sehra Bandh Ke Aaunga		
2017	Gundey		
2018	Shadi Karke Phas Gaya Yaar		
2018	Hitler		
2018	Karam Yug		
2018	Hamar Mission Hamar Banaras		
2018	Border	Dev Singh	
2018	Gangstar Dulhaniya		
2018	Ghoonghat Me Ghotala	Inspector Sanjay Pandey	
2018	Balamua Tohre Khatir		
2018	Khuddar		
2018	Dabang Sarkar	Inspector Tripathi	
2018	Nirahua Hindustani 3	Jharkhandey	
2019	Dilwar		
2019	Coolie No. 1		
2019	Lagal Raha Batasha	Inspector Lote	
2019	Raajtilak		
2019	Jai Hind		
2019	Lallu Ki Laila		
2023	Farishta		
2025	Mere Husband Ki Shadi Hai		
2025	Hamar Naam Вa Kanhaiya		
2025	Punarjanm		
2026	Mission C1000		
