= List of Bhojpuri films of 2019 =

These are the list of Bhojpuri language films that released in 2019.

== January–March ==
Opening		Title	Director	Cast	Production Company	Ref.
J A N U A R Y	25	Lagal Raha Batasha	Alok Visen	Manoj Tiger; Amrapali Dubey		
F E B R U A R Y	8	Mandir Wahi Banayenge	Praveen Kumar Guduri	Nidhi Jha		
F E B R U A R Y	15	Nirahua Chalal London	Chandra Pant	Dinesh Lal Yadav; Amrapali Dubey; Sunil Thapa	Pashupatinath Productions	
M A R C H	1	Raja	Sanjay Srivastava	Pawan Singh	L Gupta Films	
M A R C H	21	Sher-E-Hindustan	Manoj Narayan	Dinesh Lal Yadav; Neeta Dhungana; Sunil Thapa	Worldwide Records	
M A R C H	21	Crack Fighter	Sujit Kumar Singh	Pawan Singh; Nidhi Jha; Pradeep Rawat	Upendra Singh Film Creation	
M A R C H	24	Kasam Durga Ki	Ramana Mogili	Rani Chatterjee	Sri Venkateshwar Pictures	

== April – June ==
Opening		Title	Director	Cast	Production Company	Ref.
A P R I L	12	Saiyaan Ji Dagabaaz	Ajit Srivastava	Dinesh Lal Yadav; Anjana Singh; Manoj Tiger		
A P R I L	26	Special Encounter	Arun Raj	Rakesh Mishra; Ritu Singh		
M A Y	10	Dahej Danav	Rajesh Kumar	Rajesh Kumar; Kalpana Shah		
J U N E	5	Maine Unko Sajan Chun Liya	Devendra Tiwari	Kajal Raghwani; Pawan Singh; Anjana Singh	DRJ Records Bhojpuri	
J U N E	6	Coolie No. 1	Lal Babu Pandit	Khesari Lal Yadav; Kajal Raghwani	Prakriti Films	
J U N E	21	Kashi Vishwanath	Subbarao Gosangi	Ritesh Pandey; Kajal Raghwani		
J U N E	28	Jai Veeru	Subba Rao	Dinesh Lal Yadav		
