= Alok Kumar (singer) =

Indian actor

Mohan Rathore
- Born: 9 February 1986 (age 40); KHURIYARI, Bihar, India
- Occupations: Singer, Actor
- Years active: 2015–present

Alok Kumar is a Bhojpuri actor and singer. Alok Kumar was the winner of the first season of Mahuaa TV's "Sur Sangram". He debuted as an actor in the film Kahiya Biyah Bola Karba with Rinku Ghosh.

Alok Kumar was born on 9 February 1984 in Patna, Bihar. Alok is a popular singer in Uttar Pradesh, Madhya Pradesh, Bihar and Jharkhand. He has worked in many blockbuster movies, including Kahiya Biyah Bola Karba and others.

== Career ==
Alok started his career as a contestant on the Bhojpuri singing reality show "Sur Sangram", hosted by Mahuaa TV.

== Filmography ==
Key
†	Denotes films that have not yet been released

Year	Film	Role	Co-stars	Language
2015	Kahiya Biyah Bola Karba		Rinku Ghosh	Bhojpuri
2018	Dulha Hindustani		Priya Sharma	Bhojpuri
2018	Hamhu Hero Bani †	TBA	Neha Shree	Bhojpuri
2018	Iman-Dharam		Khushboo Pandey	Bhojpuri

== Discography ==
Year	Title	Film / album	Co-singer(s)
2011	"Saiyan Ho Ab Leja"	Sajan Chale Sasural	Anamika Singh
2018	"Lagata Dusara Se Pat"	Nirahua Hindustani 3	Priyanka Singh
2018	"Pala Me Laga Ke"	Nirahua Hindustani 3	Priyanka Singh
2018	"Barsati Rahe Teri Rehmat Sada"	Mehandi Laga Ke Rakhna 2	
2018	"Bhail Man Jogiya"	Mehandi Laga Ke Rakhna 2	
2018	"Nehiya Jabse Sajna Tohse Lagal"	Mehandi Laga Ke Rakhna 2	Kalpana Patowary
2018	"Maula Tere Sahar Mein"	Border	
2018	"Maai Ho Lalanwa De Da"	Border	
2018	"Bol Yarwa Bol Bol"	Border	Khesari Lal Yadav; Rajnish Mishra; Pravesh Lal Yadav
2025	"Bina Padhle Kahin Na Kono Kaam Hoyi"	Jugal Master	Nandini Tiwari
2025	"Teri God Mein Khele Hum"	Jugal Master	
2025	"Jaisan Karni Waisan Bharni"	Priya Beauty Parlour	
