= Dulha Milal Dildar =

2005 Indian film

Dulha Milal Dildar is a 2005 Bhojpuri-language film Sunil R Prasad which features Ravi Kishan and Nagma in the lead roles. It is a remake of 1997 Tamil film Surya Vamsam. This film marks as the Bhojpuri debut of actress Nagma and she won the award for Best Actress at Bhojpuri film awards in 2005.

== Plot ==
The plot follows the stressed relations between an old-fashioned dad (who is a zamindar) and his obedient but illiterate son. Set in a countryside, male-controlled background, the story thickens when an opponent to the older zamindar plots his murder with the intention of framing the son.

== Cast ==
- Ravi Kishan
- Nagma

== Soundtrack ==
- "Dulha Milal Dildar" by Kalpana Patowary, Udit Narayan
- "Lel Lel Ae Raja Ji" by Kalpana Patowary
- "Hamra Lehanga Mein Lal Sitara" by Sonu Kakkar
- "Aarti"
- "Munna Dadaji Sange Kheli" by Mohd Aziz, Arpana Bhagwat
- "Ab Ta Ehe Armaan" by Kalpana Patowary, Udit Narayan
- "Duno Duariya" by Sapna Awasthi
- "Balo Se Tel Nikal Jala" by Kailash Kher
- "Chal Chal Kahi Pyar Kare" by Kalpana Patowary, Udit Narayan
