= Nirahua Hindustani =

2014 film by Satish Jain

- Directed by: Satish Jain
- Written by: Santosh Mishra
- Produced by: Pravesh Lal Yadav; Rahul Khan
- Starring: Dinesh Lal Yadav; Amrapali Dubey; Sanjay Pandey
- Cinematography: Satya Prakash
- Edited by: Santosh Harawade
- Music by: Rajesh Rajnish
- Production companies: Nirahua Entertainment; Aadi Shakti Entertainment
- Distributed by: Nirahua Music World
- Release date: 26 June 2014 (India)
- Running time: 169 minutes
- Country: India
- Language: Bhojpuri

Nirahua Hindustani is a 2014 Indian Bhojpuri-language action-romance-comedy film written by Santosh Mishra and directed by Satish Jain. Produced and distributed by Nirahua Entertainment, Rahul Khan Productions and Nirahua Music World, respectively, the film features Dinesh Lal Yadav and Amrapali Dubey in lead roles while Ayaz Khan, Gopal Rai, Kiran Yadav and Sanjay Pandey portray pivotal roles. It is a remake of the 2012 Chhattisgarhiya film "Laila Tip Top, Chhaliya Angutha Chhap" which starred Karan Khan, Sikha Chitambare and Sanjay Mahanand and he was directed by Satish Jain. The soundtrack and film score were composed by Rajesh - Rajnish. Satya Prakash was the film's cinematographer and editing was done by Santosh Harawade.

Nirahua Hindustani was released 11 March 2015 on the official YouTube channel of Nirahua Music World. The movie has crossed over 100 million views on YouTube.

Two sequels have been released, Nirahua Hindustani 2 and Nirahua Hindustani 3.

== Plot ==
The story is about a villager name Nirahua Yadav (Dinesh Lal Yadav) who in search of his dream girl reaches Mumbai. During his stay in the city he by mistake is framed as a serial killer and sentenced to hanging. Nirahua announces his last wish: being married simultaneously. A rich girl, Sona (Amrapali Dubey), is under constant pressure from her handicapped and ill father to marry before his death. Her father leaves a will precising that Sona must marry to inherit his estate, so Sona decides to marry Nirahua when she sees his last wish broadcast on TV. Assuming the death sentence to Nirahua getting serviced in nine days, Sona takes a risk and proposes to marry him. Having found his dream girl proposing him for the marriage, Nirahu, too, agrees.

In the meantime, actual serial killer resurfaces, kills again, and is finally arrested. Nirahua is released from jail and reaches Sona's place where he learns Sona's motivation for marrying him. So Nirahua plans to leave for his village, but Sona's uncle convinces him to deal with the challenge instead of running away from it. Nirahua agrees and makes Sona's life miserable with his Villager tactics. During this span, Sona and Nirahua come to know about the condition in the will of Sona's father, according to which Sona can't divorce Nirahua otherwise she will lose her right to the estate of her father and there is only one way by which she can get her right if Nirahua divorces her. Unable to convince Nirahua to divorce, she arranges a party with her friends where she makes fun of Nirahua and his villager behavior in front of everyone, to which Nirahua reacts sharply and an argument erupts between them. Nirahua agrees to divorce Sona on a condition if she comes with him to his village and stays with his family for six months. After much deliberation and discussion with her friends, Sona accepts the offer. She takes her friends to Nirahu's village for moral support.

On reaching the village, Sona becomes point of attraction for all the people due to her western style of dress only to bring shame to Nirahu's family. Other than Nirahu's father, everyone welcomes the new bride without knowing the truth. Sona and her friends spend their first few days at Nirahu's village. The friends become disgusted and leave for Mumbai, leaving Sona alone to tackle her issues. Frustrated Sona mistreats Nirahu's family, angering his father every day. One day he is angered when the villagers complain about Sona's manner of dress, which according to village culture is inappropriate. Furious with these remarks he reaches home only to see his daughter and elder daughter-in-law dressed in Sona's clothes. Angered, he burns all the clothing, igniting an argument with Nirahua who in turn supports Sona. After all this incident, Sona asks her mother-in-law to help her get dressed in a saree, to which she readily agrees. Slowly, Sona warms to Nirahua because of his good behavior, and assimilates Bhojpuiri culture over next few weeks. The villagers and her father-in-law appreciate her coaching Nirahu's nephew for an English test which he has so far consistently failed. Sona and Nirahua develop feelings for each other but never express it.

Having become an integral part of Nirahu's family, Sona one day is surprised by the visit of her old boyfriend Tony, who discloses the reason for her marriage to her in-laws. Tony tries to force her to return to Mumbai, but she refuses. With the help of his goons, Tony tries to take her, Nirahua foils this.

Later, in front of his family Nirahua accepts the divorce terms which he agreed with Sona while bringing her to his village six months ago. Since the tenure is completed he needs to divorce her and send her back to Mumbai. Nirahu, unaware of Sona's feelings for him takes her to the bus station. When he reaches his home drunk and depressed, he finds Sona in his room. Nirahua is surprised and believes it to be a dream. But Sona confesses her deep love for Nirahua and her wish to remain forever his wife. The movie ends with Nirahua and Sona's marriage.

== Cast ==
- Dinesh Lal Yadav as Nirahua Kumar Yadav
- Amrapali Dubey as Sona Chopra
- Sanjay Mahanand as Nirahu's brother
- Ayaz Khan as Tony
- Sanjay Pandey as Bablu Yadav
- Kiran Yadav as Nirahu's mother
- Krish as Pappu
- Pakhi Hegde as item number Sarson Mein Inter Kailu

== Production ==
Under his production house, this was Nirahua's 50th project. and actress Aamrapali Dubey's debut film. Filming was underway in December 2013. Promotion for the film went public June 2014.

== Soundtrack ==
The soundtrack for Nirahua Hindustani was composed by Rajesh Rajnish with lyrics penned by Pyare Lal Yadav(Kaviji) . The soundtrack included an unusually large number of songs at 12. It was produced under the Nirahua Music World label. The soundtrack was very successful upon release, becoming one of the top viewed Bhojpuri music videos on YouTube with over 5 million views.

Tracklist
No.	Title	Singer(s)	Length
1.	"Rah Mein Nikal Chala Ye Rahi"	Alok Kumar, Dinesh Lal Yadav	3:12
2.	"Darres Tohar Farji"	Dinesh Lal Yadav	3:58
3.	"Jayeda Ye Jaan"	Khushboo Jain, Mohan Rathod	4:54
4.	"Yehi Tare Sau Saal Jiha Ye Goriya"	Dinesh Lal Yadav	4:53
5.	"Othlaliya Chikhe Da"	Dinesh Lal Yadav	3:31
6.	"Bajrang Bali Bajrang Bali"	Dinesh Lal Yadav, Kalpana	3:53
7.	"Sarson Mein Inter Kailu"	Indu Sonali, Dinesh Lal Yadav	4:50
8.	"Hamara Choliya Mein"	Kalpana	3:23
9.	"Nayee Jhulani Ke Chhaiyan"	Kalpana, Dinesh Lal Yadav	3:59
10.	"Lakho Mein Ek Pawale Bani Hum Bahurani"	Kalpana, Pravesh Lal Yadav	4:01
11.	"Ud Jaibu Ye Maina"	Kalpana, Alok Kumar	4:08
12.	"Balamuwa Kaise Tejab"	Kalpana	4:06
Total length:			53:27

== Reception ==
Nirahua Hindustani was financially successful and played to packed houses.
