= Ishqeria =

- Directed by: Prerna Wadhawan
- Written by: Prerna Wadhawan
- Produced by: Ravi Bhushan Wadhawan; Yusuf Shaikh
- Starring: Richa Chadda; Neil Nitin Mukesh
- Cinematography: Johnny Lal; Dani Sanchez-Lopez
- Edited by: Steven Barnard
- Music by: Rashid Khan; Papon; Wasim-Emraan
- Production company: Swarp Films
- Distributed by: Yen Movies
- Release date: 21 September 2018
- Running time: 118 minutes
- Country: India
- Language: Hindi

Ishqeria (transl. Lovers; Hindi pronunciation: [ɪʃkeːɾɪjaː]) is a 2018 Indian Hindi-language romantic drama film written and directed by Prerna Wadhawan. The film stars Richa Chadda and Neil Nitin Mukesh in the lead roles. The dialogues are written by Radhika Anand. Ishqeria was theatrical released on 21 September 2018 after a delay of three years. The film's motion poster were released on 2 August 2018, followed by the theatrical trailer on 29 August 2018.

== Cast ==
- Richa Chadda as Kuhu
- Neil Nitin Mukesh as Raghav
- Bani J as Asha
- Mrinalini Sharma as Radhika
- Mridula Sathe

== Production ==
Ishqeria was shot between 2012 and 2014 in Mussoorie and Allahabad where the unit had faced problems due to the rough weather and production constraints. The film was slated to release in 2015, however due to Prerna's marriage, it was delayed.

== Soundtrack ==
Ishqeria

Soundtrack album by Rashid Khan, Papon and Wasim-Emraan
- Released: 20 September 2018
- Recorded: 2018
- Genre: Feature film soundtrack
- Length: 39:15
- Language: Hindi
- Label: T-Series
External audio
- Official Audio Jukebox on YouTube

The songs are composed by Rashid Khan, Papon and Wasim-Emraan. The lyrics are written by Rashid Khan, Protiqe Majumder, Ajay K. Garg and Haider Najmi.

Track listing
No.	Title	Lyrics	Music	Singer(s)	Length
1.	"Assalatul"	Rashid Khan	Rashid Khan	Aarish Singh	5:48
2.	"Toofaani Hawa"	Protiqe Majumder	Papon	Papon	4:16
3.	"Jeans Pant Aur Choli"	Protiqe Majumder	Papon	Papon, Kalpana Patowary	3:50
4.	"Milon Ke Faasle"	Ajay K. Garg	Rashid Khan	Shafqat Amanat Ali, Altamash Faridi	5:48
5.	"Yaadein"	Protiqe Majumder	Papon	Papon, Kalpana Patowary	3:46
6.	"Ishqeria"	Haider Najmi	Wasim-Emraan	Javed Ali, Wrisha Dutta	5:27
7.	"Milon Ke Faasle" (Unplugged)	Ajay K. Garg	Rashid Khan	Sandeep Bhatra, Suvaani Raaj	4:32
8.	"Assalatul" (Duet Version)	Rashid Khan	Rashid Khan	Aarish Singh, Tarrannum Mailik	5:48
Total length:					39:15
