= Nirahua Hindustani 2 =

Bhojpuri Film

- Directed by: Manjul Thakur
- Written by: Manjul Thakur; Gautam Sinha; Arvind Tiwari
- Screenplay by: Manjul Thakur; Gautam Sinha; Arvind Tiwari
- Story by: Manjul Thakur
- Produced by: Rahul Khan
- Starring: Dinesh Lal Yadav; Amrapali Dubey; Sanchita Benarjee; Sanjay Pandey; Leslie Tripathy; Ayaz Khan; Prakash Jais
- Cinematography: Sarfraz Rashid Khan
- Edited by: Santosh Harawade
- Music by: Aslam Surty
- Production companies: Nirahua Entertainment Pvt Ltd; Rahul Khan Production
- Distributed by: Wave Music
- Release date: 12 May 2017
- Running time: 166 minutes
- Country: India
- Language: Bhojpuri

Nirahua Hindustani 2 is a 2017 Indian Bhojpuri-language action drama film written and directed by Manjul Thakur and produced by Rahul Khan under banner of "Rahul Khan Production". The film features Dinesh Lal Yadav, Amrapali Dubey and Sanchita Banerjee (Bhojpuri debut) in lead roles while Sanjay Pandey, Ayaz Khan, Kiran Yadav, Ashish Shendre, Prakash Jais, Santosh Verma, Sanjay Mahanand and Samarth Chaturvedi in supporting roles. Leslie Tripathy plays cameo role of Parineeta It is a sequel of 2014 film Nirahua Hindustani. It world records of "Most Viewed Bhojpuri Film" on YouTube with 340 million views.

== Cast ==
- Dinesh Lal Yadav as Nirahu Kumar Yadav
- Amrapali Dubey as Chandani Nirahu Yadav
- Sanchita Benarjee as Kiran Khanna (Kiran Nirahu Yadav)
- Prakash Jais as Kunru Shahri (Nirahua's Friend)
- Ayaz Khan as Rakesh Kumar (Rocky)
- Ashish Shendre as Nirahua's Father
- Kiran Yadav as Nirahua's Mother
- Samarth Chaturvedi as Shivkumar Yadav (Nirahua's elder Brother)
- Sanjay Mahanand as Nandu (Nirahua's younger Brother)
- Sanjay Pandey as Paras Yadav (Nirahua's Uncle)
- Ritu Pandey as Paras Wife (Nirahua's Aunty)
- Sanjay Verma as Nirahua's Friend
- Seema Singh as Comio
- Dev Singh as Bank Robber
- Rahul Khan as Kiran's Friend
- Asgar Khan as CID Officer
- Santosh Pahalwan as CID Officer

== Production ==
Filming for this film was done in Kelwari village in Bharwara, Dhamtari, Wonder Land Water Park (Raipur), Dr Ajay Sahay Hospital (Raipur) in Chhattisgarh and Birwai village in Azamgarh district of Uttar Pradesh with some scenes shot in Nikunj Kunj (Madh), Basra Studio (Kandiwali), Nandan Van village (Malad wast), Uttan Beach (Bhayandar), Fever Art and Golden Tulip Star Hotel (Vasai) in Mumbai.

The cinematography has been done by Sarfraz Rashid Khan while choreography is by Kanu Mukharjee. Art direction done by Nazir Shaikh. It was edited by Santosh Harawade while action direction by Andlib Pathan. Dress designed by Kavita-Sunita. Background music scored by Aslam Surty while VFX done by "What Studio". Dubbing done in "Park Avenue Studio".

== Release ==
The film was released on 12 May 2017 at theatres of Bihar, Jharkhand and Nepal. He is remarked as all-time blockbuster on Bhojpuri box office.

== Soundtrack ==
Nirahua Hindustani 2

Soundtrack album by Chhote Baba & Madhukar Anand
- Released: 2017
- Venue: Mumbai
- Studio: Nirahua Music World
- Genre: Feature film soundtrack
- Length: 33:44
- Language: Bhojpuri
- Label: Wave Music
- Producer: Rahul Khan

The soundtrack for "Nirahua Hindustani 2" was composed by Chhote Baba and Madhukar Anand with lyrics penned by Pyare Lal Yadav, Azad Singh, Shyam Dehati and Santosh Puri. The soundtrack included an unusually large number of songs at 10. It was produced under the "Wave Music" label, who also bought his satellite rights.

All songs of this film was released on YouTube official Channel of "Wave Music". All songs are superhit on YouTube. His song " Jhanak Jala Matha" sung by Indu Sonali and Alka Jha is crossed 28 million views on YouTube.

Track Listing
No.	Title	Lyrics	Music	Singer(s)	Length
1.	"Hamke Dulhi Chahi"	Pyare Lal Yadav	Chhote Baba	Alok Kumar, Mohan Rathore	4:23
2.	"Jujhata Garibi Se Bihar"	Shyam Dehati	Chhote Baba	Alok Kumar, Chhote Baba, Kiran Yadav	2:53
3.	"Senura Singar Ke"	Pyare Lal Yadav	Chhote Baba	Alok Kumar, Nitu Singh	1:32
4.	"Raji Kake Balam Baaji Maar Lihle"	Pyare Lal Yadav	Chhote Baba	Kalpana Patowary	2:34
5.	"Kabahu Na Jaiha Ae Beti"	Pyare Lal Yadav	Chhote Baba	Alok Kumar, Chhote Baba, Nitu Singh	5:15
6.	"Jhanak Jata Matha"	Pyare Lal Yadav	Chhote Baba	Indu Sonali, Alka Jha	3:20
7.	"Beta Raur Bate Badka Nikamma"	Pyare Lal Yadav	Chhote Baba	Kalpana Patowary	1:56
8.	"Batawa Jaan Kawana Badari Me"	Pyare Lal Yadav	Chhote Baba	Alok Kumar, Kalpana Patowary, Alka Jha	3:52
9.	"Nisha Me Chadal Ba"	Azad Singh	Madhukar Anand	Madhukar Anand, Priyanka Singh	3:29
10.	"Chumma Chapkauwa"	Santosh Puri	Madhukar Anand	Dinesh Lal Yadav, Khushboo Jain	4:30
Total length:					33:44

== Marketing ==
Official trailer of the film was released on 30 April 2017 at YouTube official handle of Wave Music and he crossed over 11 million views till now.

The film was also released at online video platform site YouTube on 26 November 2017 at official channel of Wave Music Bhojpuri, and he create history of Most Viewed Bhojpuri Film on YouTube. As on 12 June 2019, he is the first Bhojpuri film to crossed 150 million on YouTube. He crossed over 211 million views on till now.

== Award and nominations ==
Ceremony	Venue	Category	Recipient(s) and nominee(s)	Result	Ref.
Sabrang Film Awards 2018	Mumbai	Best Director	Manjul Thakur	Won	
Sabrang Film Awards 2018	Mumbai	Best Playback Singer (Female)	Kalpana Patowary	Won	
Sabrang Film Awards 2018	Mumbai	Best Music Director	Chhote Baba	Nominated	
Sabrang Film Awards 2018	Mumbai	Best Actor In A Negative Role	Sanjay Pandey	Won	
Sabrang Film Awards 2018	Mumbai	Most Popular Film	Nirahua Hindustani 2	Won	
Sabrang Film Awards 2018	Mumbai	Best Debutant Actress	Sanchita Benarjee	Nominated	
Sabrang Film Awards 2018	Mumbai	Best Choreography	Kanu Mukharjee	Won	
Sabrang Film Awards 2018	Mumbai	Best Action	Andlib Pathan	Nominated	
Sabrang Film Awards 2018	Mumbai	Best Screenplay	Manjul Thakur	Won	
