= Shubhi Sharma =

Indian actress

- Occupations: Actress; Television presenter; Model

Shubhi Sharma is an Indian actress who is active mainly in Bhojpuri-language films. She is known for her role in Chalni Ke Chaalal Dulha opposite Pravesh Lal Yadav, for which she received the award for Best Female Debut of the Year at the 5th Bhojpuri Film Awards.

== Acting career ==
Sharma started her career with Pravesh Lal Yadav in Chalni Ke Chaalal Dulha. Her other notable films have included Bhaiya Ke Sali Odhania Wali with Pawan Singh, Santan with Ravi Kishan, and Chhapra Express with Khesari Lal Yadav.

== Filmography ==
Key
†	Denotes films that have not yet been released

Year	Film	Language
2008	Chalni Ke Chaalal Dulha	Bhojpuri
2010	Bhaiya Ke Sali Odhania Wali	Bhojpuri
2010	Hero	Bhojpuri
2011	Santaan	Bhojpuri
2013	Dulhe Raja	Bhojpuri
2013	Tiger	Bhojpuri
2013	Chhapra Express	Bhojpuri
2013	Charano Ki Saugandh	Bhojpuri
2013	Prem Diwani	Bhojpuri
2013	Chhapra Express	Bhojpuri
2013	Banaras Wali	Bhojpuri
2013	Veer Balwan	Bhojpuri
2013	Katta Tanal Dupatta Par	Bhojpuri
2015	Welcome Back	Hindi
2015	Ghulami	Bhojpuri
2016	Dulhan Chahi Pakistan Se	Bhojpuri
2016	Ram Lakhan	Bhojpuri
2017	Aatankwadi	Bhojpuri
2017	Muqaddar	Bhojpuri
2018	Bairi Kangana 2	Bhojpuri
2018	Border	Bhojpuri
2018	Dulhan Chahi Pakistan Se 2	Bhojpuri
2018	Nirahua Hindustani 3	Bhojpuri
2018	Balam Ji Love You	Bhojpuri
