= Lollipop Lagelu =

2008 song by Pawan Singh

"Lolipop Lagelu"

Album by Pawan Singh

from the album Lolipop Lageli"
- Released: 10 August 2008
- Recorded: Wave Music
- Studio: Wave Music Studio
- Venue: Delhi
- Genre: Bhojpuri Folk / Dance Pop
- Length: 6:04 (Single); 5:37 (Music video)
- Label: Wave Music
- Composer: Vinay Vinayak
- Lyricist: Zahid Akhtar
- Producer: Ajit Singh

Pawan Singh chronology
"Odhaniya Wali" (2004)	"Lolipop Lagelu" (2008)	"Jawani Jabse Chadhal Ba" (2008)

"Lolipop Lagelu" is a Bhojpuri song performed by Pawan Singh, released in 2008 by Wave Music. It has been described as a "party anthem".

The song remains one of the most requested tracks at concerts and public events featuring Pawan Singh.

This music album contains special appearance of adult star Aditya Choudhary (Rait) as well.
