= Naach Baiju Naach =

2022 Bhojpuri Film

Naach Baiju Naach (transl. Dance Baiju, Dance) is a 2022 Bhojpuri-Language film written, directed and produced by Lal Vijay Shahdeo. The film stars Dinesh Lal Yadav a.k.a. Nirahua, Ravi Jhankal, Pragati Chaurasia and Neetu Pandey.

== Plot ==
The film is based on the Folk dance of Bhojpuri region, Launda Naach and the status of their performers in the society.

== Cast ==
- Dinesh Lal Yadav
- Ravi Jhankal
- Pragati Chaurasia
- Neetu Pandey
- Khushboo Sharma
- Dadhi Pandey
