= Aashiqui (2022 film) =

2022 Bhojpuri film

- Directed by: Parag Patil
- Written by: Rakesh Tripathi
- Story by: Khesari Lal Yadav
- Produced by: Pradeep K. Sharma
- Starring: Khesari Lal Yadav; Kunal Singh; Amrapali Dubey; Shruti Rao
- Cinematography: R.R. Prince
- Edited by: Komal Verma
- Music by: Score: Aslam Surty; Songs: Om Jha; Arya Sharma
- Production company: Baba Motion Pictures Pvt. Ltd.
- Release date: 4 March 2022 (India)
- Country: India
- Language: Bhojpuri

Aashiqui is a 2022 Bhojpuri-language action romance film directed by Parag Patil and produced by Pradeep K. Sharma under "Baba Motion Pictures". Written by Khesari Lal Yadav the film talks about social topics like untouchability and inter-caste marriage. It film stars Khesari Lal Yadav, Kunal Singh, Amrapali Dubey and Shruti Rao.

== Plot ==
Raja, a Brahmin boy falls in love with Ganga, a girl from lower caste, denies to marry to the girl of his father's choice for Ganga and leaves his caste.

== Cast ==
- Khesari Lal Yadav as Raja Dubey, an upper caste boy
- Kunal Singh as Satish Dubey, Raja's father
- Amrapali Dubey as Ganga, a lower caste girl and Raja's love
- Shruti Rao
- Pappu Yadav, a man from Ganga's community

== Production ==
=== Development ===
Story of this film was written by Khesari Lal Yadav during the COVID-19 lockdown.

=== Casting ===
Amrapali Dubey was chosen for the role against Khesari Lal Yadav. Later the name of Shruti Rao also announced.

=== Filming ===
Principal photography commenced on 5 March 2021 in Allahabad.

== Music ==
Soundtrack of the film is produced by Om Jha and Arya Sharma while Shyam Dehati and Vijay Chauhan wrote the lyrics.

== Release ==
The film released on 4 March 2020 across India.
