= Pradeep Pandey =

Indian actor (born 1992)

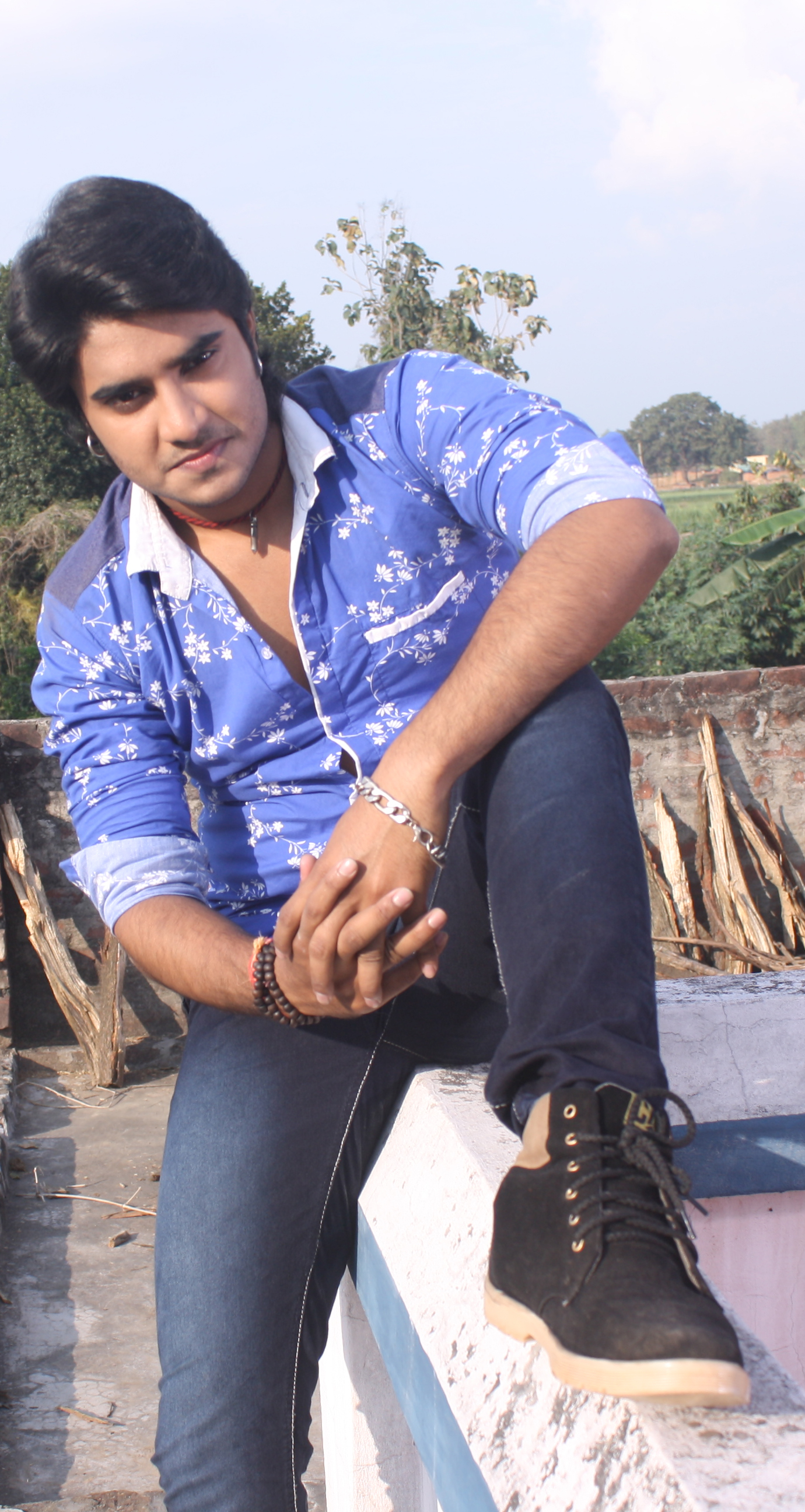
- Born: 9 December 1992 (age 33); Bombay, Maharashtra, India
- Other name: Chintu
- Occupations: Actor; singer; model
- Years active: 2009–present

Pradeep Pandey "Chintu" is an Indian actor mainly active in Bhojpuri language films. In 2009 Pandey made his acting debut in the Bhojpuri film Deewana, for which he won the Juri Mention Award.

== Early life and education ==
Pandey was born on 9 December 1992 in Bombay city of Maharashtra. He is the son of filmmaker Rajkumar R. Pandey, who is known for his works mostly in Bhojpuri films.

== Career ==
In 2009 Pandey made his acting debut in the Bhojpuri movie Deewana, for which he won the Juri Mention Award.

He is also known by the names "Chintu" and "Pradeep Pandey Chintu" in the Bhojpuri film industry.

== Filmography ==
- All films are in Bhojpuri language unless otherwise noted.

Key
†	Denotes films that have not yet been released

Year	Film	Role	Co-stars	Notes
2009	Deewana		Dinesh Lal Yadav, Pakhi Hegde	
2009	Saat Saheliyan	Bhawani	Dinesh Lal Yadav, Pakhi Hegde	
2010	Devra Bada Satawela	Chintu	Pawan Singh, Ravi Kishan	
2011	Truck Driver	Prem	Pawan Singh, Kajal Raghwani, Anjana Singh	
2011	Piyawa Bada Satavela	Chintu	Ravi Kishan, Rani Chatterjee	
2011	Mai Nagin Tu Nagina	Chintu	Pakhi Hegde	
2013	Jeena Teri Gali Me	Suraj	Priyanka Pandit, Rinku Ghosh, Pakkhi Hegde, Shree Kankani	
2014	Devra Bhail Deewana	Rahul	Manoj Tiwari, Pakhi Hegde, Kajal Raghwani	
2014	Nagina		Rinku Ghosh, Kajal Raghwani, Priyanka Pandit	
2015	Dulaara	Raja urf Ranjita Rani	Tanushree, Ritu Singh, Rani Chatterjee	
2015	Chhora Ganga Kinare Wala	Raju	Ravi Kishan	
2016	Truck Driver 2	Chintu Pandey	Nidhi Jha, Ritesh Pandey	
2016	Dulhan Chahi Pakistan Se	Surya	Shubhi Sharma, Tanushree	
2016	Deewane	Suraj	Priyanka Pandit	
2017	Mohabbat	Mohabbat	Kajal Yadav	
2017	Sasural	Suraj	Kajal Yadav, Amrita Acharya	
2017	Rangeela	Rangeela	Tanushree	
2018	Mehandi Laga Ke Rakhna 2	Rajesh urf Raju	Richa Dixit	Remake of Bollywood film Humko Tumse Pyaar Hai
2018	Mai Re Mai Hamra Uhe Laiki Chahi	Chintu Pandey	Priti Dhyani	
2018	Dulhan Chahi Pakistan Se 2	Raja	Rahul Dev, Surbhi Shukla, Priyanka Pandit, Gunjan Kapoor	
2019	Mandir Wahi Banayenge	Chintu Pandey	Nidhi Jha	
2019	Naayak	Suraj	Pawani	
2019	Vivah	Anand	Sanchita Benarji, Akanksha Awasthi	
2019	Laila Majnu	Majnu	Rani Chatterjee	
2020	Jay Shambhu†	TBA	Shilpa Pokhrel	Post-production
2020	Premgeet†	TBA	Yamini Singh	Post-production
2020	Dostana†	TBA	Awdhesh Mishra	Post-production
2020	Saat Hindustani†	TBA	Kajal Raghwani	Post-production
2020	Chintu Ki Dulhania†	TBA	Mani Bhattacharya	Muhurat
2022	Rowdy Rocky	Rocky	Mani Bhattacharya, Sayaji Shinde	
