= Yash Kumarr =

Indian film actor (born 1985)

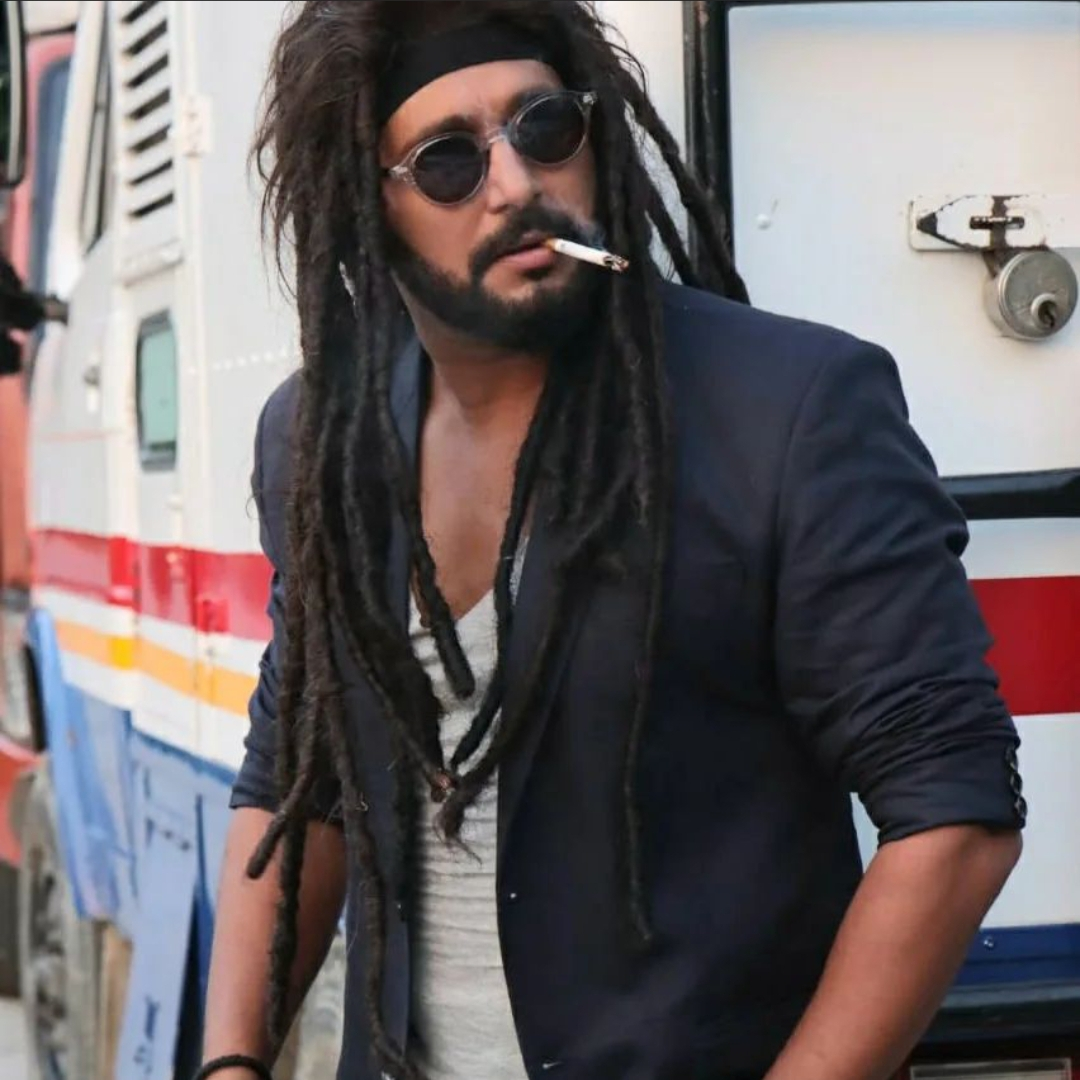
- Yash Kumarr during shoot of bhojpuri movie "Shool"
- Born: Sachin Mishra; 12 February 1985 (age 41) {Chainpur},Ballia, Uttar Pradesh, India
- Other names: Yash Kumar, Yash Mishra, Yash Kumar Mishra
- Occupations: Actor; Film Producer; Singer; Writer
- Years active: 2010–present
- Spouse(s): Anjana Singh (m. 2013; div. 2018) Nidhi Jha (m. 2022)
- Website: yashkumarr.com

Yash Kumarr (born 12 February 1985) is an Indian actor and producer who works primarily in Bhojpuri language films, mainly in lead roles.

== Career ==
Yash Kumarr started his career in the television serial Agle Janam Mohe Bitiya Hi Kijo 2010 and Taarak Mehta Ka Ooltah Chashmah 2012.

In 2013 he made his film acting debut in the Bhojpuri movie ‘Dildar Sanwariya’ directed by Vishal Verma and his performance was praised by critics and audiences. In 2023, Yash acted in Bhojpuri film ‘Chachi No.1’ opposite Raksha Gupta.

== Filmography ==
Key
†	Denotes films that have not yet been released

Year	Title	Reference
2013	Dildar Sawariya	
2013	Raja ji I Love you	
2014	Dariya Dil	
2014	Dil Lagi Dupatta wali se	
2014	Balam Rasiya	
2015	Sapera	
2015	Hero Gamchha wala	
2015	Lagi Tohse Lagan	
2016	Ichhadhari	
2016	Rangdari Rax	
2016	Action Raja	
2017	Ek Rajai Teen Lugai	
2017	India V/S Pakistan	
2017	Lootere	
2017	Rudra	
2018	Mehandi Laga ke Rakhna	
2018	Nagraj	
2018	Shiva Banal Don	
2019	Bitiya Chhati maai ke	
2019	Parvarish	
2020	Chhotki Thakurain	
2020	Tu 16 Baras ki Mai 17 Baras ka	
2020	Ichhadhari Naag	
2020	Vachan	
2020	Kasam Paida Karne wale ki 2	
2020	Pyar Hamara Amar Rahega	
2021	Dehati Babu	
2021	Beti No. 1	
2021	Thoda Gussa Thoda Pyar	
2021	Chandan Parinay Gunja	
2023	Chachi No. 1	
2023	Aghori	
Upcoming	Vidhwa Bani Suhagan	
