= List of Bhojpuri films of 2025 =

This is a list of Bhojpuri language films released in 2025.

== January–March ==
Opening		Title	Director	Cast	Production company	Ref.
FEBRUARY	4	Mere Husband Ki Shadi Hai	Manjul Thakur	Kajal Raghwani; Amrapali Dubey; Dinesh Lal Yadav	J.R. Production House	
FEBRUARY	21	Duns	Dhiraj Thakur	Khesari Lal Yadav; Shweta Sen	Global Music Junction Pvt.Ltd	
MARCH	14	Rishtey	Premanshu Singh	Khesari Lal Yadav; Rati Pandey; Akanksha Puri	SRK Music Private Limited	

== April–June ==
Opening		Title	Director	Cast	Production company	Ref.
MAY	25	Jugal Master	Lal Babu Pandit	Raksha Gupta; Nirahua	Captain Video Private Limited	

== July–September ==
Opening		Title	Director	Cast	Production company	Ref.
AUGUST	30	Ye Hai Swarg Hamara	Murali Lalwani	Kunal Singh		
SEPTEMBER	22	TV Wali Biwi	Ishtiyaq shaikh Bunty	Amrapali Dubey		
