= Amrapali Dubey =

Indian actress (born 1987)

- Dubey in 2026
- Born: 11 January 1987 (age 39); Gorakhpur, Uttar Pradesh, India
- Occupations: Actress; host; model
- Years active: 2009–present
- Website: amrapalidubey.com

Amrapali Dubey (born 11 January 1987) is an Indian actress who primarily works in Bhojpuri films alongside Hindi television. Considered one of the highest paid and prominent Bhojpuri actresses, Dubey is a recipient of several accolades including four Bhojpuri Film Awards and two International Bhojpuri Film Awards.

Dubey made her acting debut with the television soap opera Saat Phere – Saloni Ka Safar (2009). Following her known portrayal of Suman in Rehna Hai Teri Palkon Ki Chhaon Mein, she ventured into Bhojpuri films with Nirahua Hindustani (2014). Dubey established herself as a leading Bhojpuri actress with the successful films, Nirahua Hindustani 2 (2017), Border (2018), Nirahua Hindustani 3 (2018), Nirahua Chalal London (2019), Sher Singh (2019), Aashiqui (2022), Love Vivah.com (2022) and Doli Saja Ke Rakhna (2022).

== Early life ==
Dubey was born on 11 January 1987 in Gorakhpur district of Uttar Pradesh. She eventually moved to Mumbai with her grandfather, and completed her education there at Bhavan's College.

== Career ==
Dubey started her career with television, and is known for playing Shweta Singh in Saat Phere – Saloni Ka Safar, Tina in Maayka, Suman Pratapsingh in Rehna Hai Teri Palkon Ki Chhaon Mein and Reet Singh in Mera Naam Karegi Roshan.

Dubey started her career in Bhojpuri films with Nirahua Hindustani. She further established herself as a leading actress with successful films such as Patna Se Pakistan, Nirahua Hindustani 2, Border, Nirahua Hindustani 3, Nirahua Chalal London, Jai Veeru, Sher Singh, Aashiqui, LoveVivah.com and Doli Saja Ke Rakhna.

She is also known for her on-screen pairing with Dinesh Lal Yadav. Her film Border, ranks as the fourth highest grossing Bhojpuri film worldwide.

In 2026, Dubey appeared in Bhojpuri Bawaal, a Bhojpuri celebrity reality series that premiered on 2 August 2026 on JioHotstar and Colors TV. She was part of the show's core cast alongside Pawan Singh, Dinesh Lal Yadav 'Nirahua', Kajal Raghwani and Tej Pratap Yadav. Unlike most reality shows, it had no tasks or eliminations; it followed the participants' personal and professional lives instead. Her long-running on-screen partnership with Nirahua drew renewed attention during the show, and she described their relationship as professional. In 2026, Dubey participated in the twentieth season of the Indian reality television show Bigg Boss, hosted by Salman Khan.

== Media image ==
Amrapali Dubey 2026

Dubey is considered as one of the most popular and highest paid Bhojpuri actress. She is also one of the most followed Bhojpuri actress on Instagram with over 5.9 million followers.

== Filmography ==
=== Films ===
Key
†	Denotes films that have not yet been released

Year	Title	Role	Notes	Ref.
2014	Nirahua Hindustani	Sona Chopra		
2015	Patna Se Pakistan	Shahnaz		
2015	Nirahua Rikshawala 2			
2015	Jigarwala			
2015	Baghi Bhaile Sajna Hamaar			
2015	Raja Babu	Kusum		
2016	Bam Bam Bol Raha Hai Kashi	Suman Singh		
2016	Doodh Ka Karz	Unknown	Special appearance	
2016	Aashik Awara	Aarti		
2016	Nirahua Chalal Sasural 2			
2016	Ram Lakhan			
2016	Mokama 0 Kilometer			
2016	Beta			
2017	Satya	Dancer	Special appearance in song "Rate Diya Buta Ke"	
2017	Nirahua Hindustani 2	Chandani Nirahu Yadav		
2017	Nirahua Satal Rahe			
2017	Kashi Amarnath			
2018	Border	Nagma Shashtri		
2018	Dulhan Ganga Paar Ke	Dancer	Special appearance in song "Marad Abhi Bacha Ba"	
2018	Nirahua Hindustani 3	Champa		
2019	Nirahua Chalal London	Julie		
2019	Maine Unko Sajan Chun Liya	Dancer	Special appearance in song "Bhatar Ko Bhi Bhul Jaogi"	
2019	Lagal Raha Batasha	Amrapali		
2019	Jai Veeru			
2019	Lallu Ki Laila	Divya		
2019	Sher Singh			
2020	Muqaddar Ka Sikandar			
2020	Pangebaaz	Unknown	Special Appearance	
2020	Romeo Raja			
2021	Nirahua The Leader			
2022	Aashiqui	Ganga		
2022	Love Vivah.Com			
2022	Doli Saja Ke Rakhna			
2022	Saajan			
2023	Raja Doli Leke Aaja			
2023	Daag - Ego Lalchhan			
2023	Maai: Pride of Bhojpuri			
2024	Fasal			
2024	Vivah 3			
2024	Nirahua Banal Karodpati †	TBA	Post-production	
2024	Main Mayeke Chali Jaungi †	TBA	Completed	
2024	Nirahua Hindustani 4 †	TBA	Filming	
2025	Mere Husband Ki Shadi Hai			
2025	TV Wali Biwi			
TBA	Gabbroo †	TBA	Completed	
TBA	Veer Yoddha Mahabali †	TBA	Completed	
TBA	Aayi Milan Ki Raat †	TBA	Completed	
TBA	Nirahua Chalal Sasural 3 †	TBA	Filming	
TBA	Naagin 2 †	TBA	Filming	
TBA	TV Wali Biwi		First look out	

=== Television ===
Year	Title	Role	Notes	Ref.
2009	Saat Phere – Saloni Ka Safar	Shweta Singh		
2009	Maayka	Tina		
2009–2010	Rehna Hai Teri Palkon Ki Chhaon Mein	Suman Pratapsingh		
2010	Mera Naam Karegi Roshan	Reet Singh		
2013	Fear Files: Darr Ki Sacchi Tasvirein	Unknown	Episode 67	
2013	Haunted Nights	Wife		
2013	Arjun	Urmila Satija	Episode 70	
2026	Bhojpuri Bawaal	Herself		
2026–	Bigg Boss 20	Contestant		

== Award and nominations ==
Year	Award	Category	Film	Result	Ref.
2015	Bhojpuri Film Awards	Best Actor - Female	Nirahua Hindustani	Nominated	
2015	Bhojpuri Film Awards	Best Debut Actress	Nirahua Hindustani	Won	
2016	Bhojpuri Film Awards	Best Actor - Female	Nirhua Rickshawala 2	Nominated	
2016	Bhojpuri Film Awards	Best Actor - Female	Raja Babu	Won	
2017	Bhojpuri Film Awards	Best Actor - Female	Kashi Amarnath	Won	
2017	Sabrang Film Awards	Best Actor - Female	Ram Lakhan	Won	
2017	Sabrang Film Awards	Most Popular Pair (with Dinesh Lal Yadav)	Ram Lakhan	Won	
2018	Sabrang Film Awards	Most Popular Actress	—N/a	Won	
2018	International Bhojpuri Film Awards	Best Actress - Critics	Nirahua Hindustani 2	Won	
2018	International Bhojpuri Film Awards	YouTube Queen	—N/a	Won	
2019	Bhojpuri Cine Awards	Best Actress	Nirahua Hindustani 3	Won	
2019	Bhojpuri Film Awards	Best Actor - Female	Nirahua Hindustani 3	Nominated	
2023	Bhojpuri Film Awards	Best Actor - Female	Lagal Raha Batasha	Won	
2023	Bhojpuri Cine Awards	Best Actress	Aashiqui	Won	
2023	International Bhojpuri Film Awards	Best Actress	Love Vivah.com	Won	

== See also ==
- List of Bhojpuri actresses
