= Nidhi Jha =

Indian actress

- Born: 18 October 1988 (age 37); Maharashtra, India
- Other names: Lulia, Nidhi Yash Mishra
- Occupation: Actress
- Years active: 2010–present
- Spouse: Yash Kumar Mishra (m. 2022)

Nidhi Jha (born 18 October 1988) is an Indian actress who works in Hindi television serials and Bhojpuri language films. She has appeared in Balika Vadhu, CID, Crime Patrol, Sapne Suhane Ladakpan Ke, Adaalat, Encounter, Beintehaa, Savdhaan India and Aahat (season 6).

== Personal life ==
Jha married Yash Kumar Mishra in May 2022.

== Television ==
- Colors TV's Balika Vadhu and Beintehaa
- Sony TV's Crime Patrol, Adaalat, Encounter, Aahat (season 6) and Sankatmochan Mahabali Hanuman
- Zee TV's Sapne Suhane Ladakpan Ke
- ZEE TV's Doli Armaano Ki as Nidhi Khanna
- Life OK's Savdhaan India as Dimple (Episode 293) / Sona Bhushan (Episode 450) / Divya (Episode 580) / Niyati Patel ( Episode 739) /Anokhi Chaudhari, Psycho Killer mental patient (Episode 843) / Sunita (Episode 892) / Riya Gupta (Episode 1134) / Ayesha (Episode 1244).
- &TV's Kuldeepak
- Sab TV Taarak Mehta Ka Oolta Chashmah

== Filmography ==
Key
†	Denotes films that have not yet been released

Year	Film	Role	Co-stars	Language	Notes
2016	Gadar		Pawan Singh	Bhojpuri	
2016	Ziddi	Pooja	Pawan Singh, Viraj Bhatt	Bhojpuri	
2017	Truck Driver 2	Meera and Meena (Dual Role)	Pradeep Pandey "Chintu", Ritesh Pandey	Bhojpuri	
2017	Satya	Special Appearance in song Luliya Mangele	Pawan Singh, Akshara Singh	Bhojpuri	
2018	Kasam Paida Karne Wale Ki		Yash Kumar Mishra	Bhojpuri	
2018	Swarg		Arvind Akela "Kallu", Priya Sharma, Nisha Dubey	Bhojpuri	
2018	Mai Re Mai Hamka Uhe Laiki Chahi	Special Appearance in song Pandey Ji Ka Beta Hu	Pradeep Pandey "Chintu"	Bhojpuri	
2018	Gangster Dulhaniya		Gaurav Jha	Bhojpuri	
2019	Mandir Wahi Banayenge	Siya	Pradeep Pandey "Chintu"	Bhojpuri	
2019	Crack Fighter		Pawan Singh	Bhojpuri	
2019	Jai Hind		Pawan Singh	Bhojpuri	
2019	Dilwar †	TBA	Arvind Akela "Kallu"	Bhojpuri	Filming
2019	Shankar †	Paro	Yash Kumar Mishra	Bhojpuri	Filming
2022	Pyari Chandani †	TBA	Pawan Singh	Bhojpuri	First look out

== Awards ==
Ceremony	Category	Year	Film	Result	Reference
Sabrang Awards	Critics Award for Best Actor (Female)	2019	Gangster Dulhaniya	Won	
