= Pawan Singh =

Indian musician, actor, and politician (born 1986)

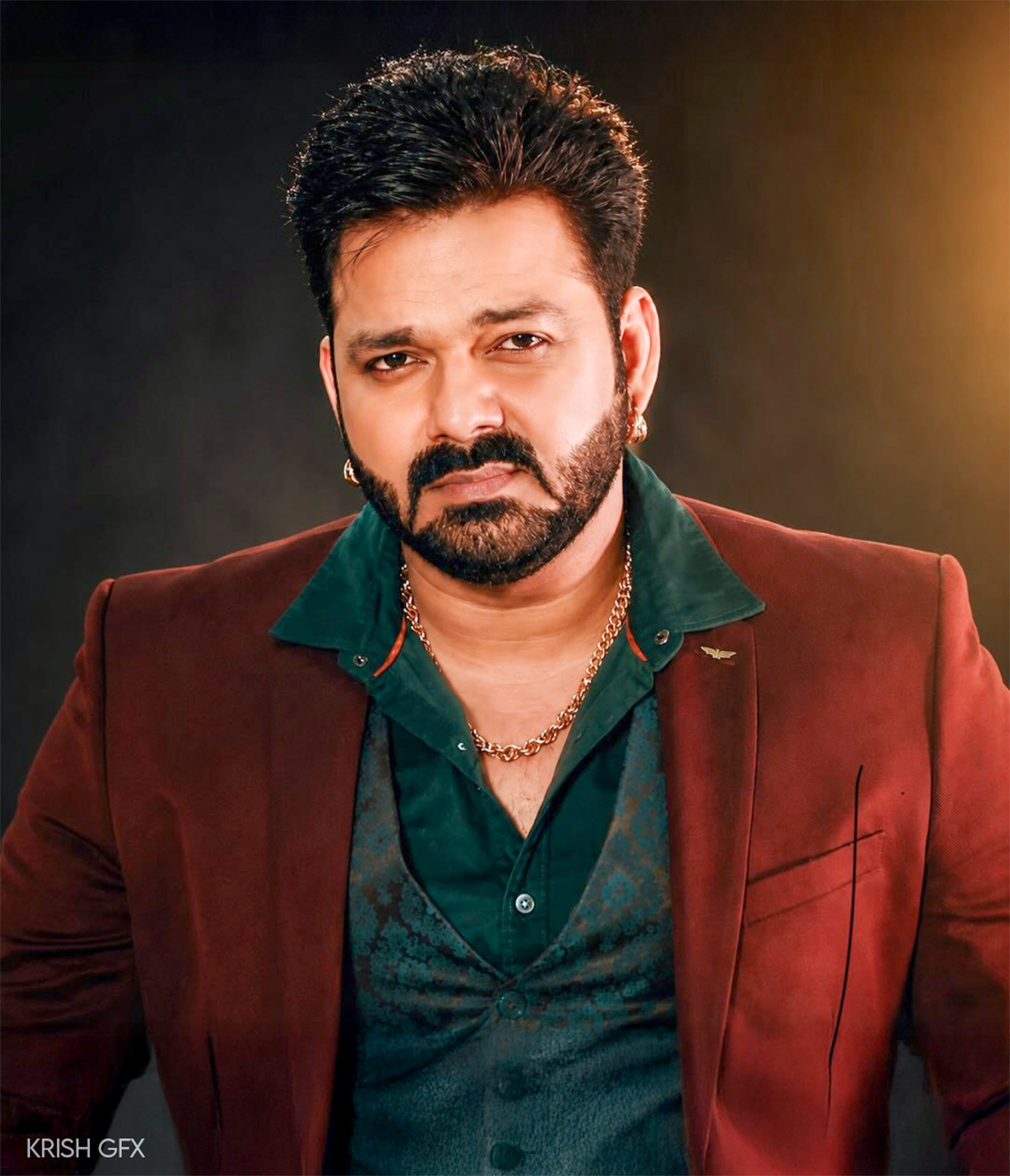
- Pawan Singh in 2026

Member of Bihar Legislative Council
- Incumbent
- Assumed office 11 June 2026
- Constituency: elected by MLA's

Personal details
- Born: 5 January 1986 (age 40) Arrah, Bihar, India
- Party: Bharatiya Janata Party
- Spouses: Neelam Singh (m. 2014; died 2015) Jyoti Singh (m. 2018)
- Parents: Ramashankar Singh (father); Pratima Devi (mother)
- Occupation: Playback singer; Actor; Composer; Politician
- Awards: (see awards)
- Nickname: Power Star
- Musical career
- Genres: Bhojpuri music; Filmi; Folk; Classical
- Labels: T-Series; Wave Music; Zee Music Company; Worldwide Records Bhojpuri

YouTube information
- Channel: Pawan Singh Official
- Years active: 2009 –present
- Genre: Music
- Subscribers: 6.45 million
- Views: 2.131 billion
- Last updated: 8 July 2026

Pawan Singh (born 5 January 1986) is an Indian playback singer, actor, composer and politician associated primarily with the Bhojpuri film industry. He began his music career in the 1990s before making his acting debut in Rangli Chunariya Tohre Naam (2007).He gained wider recognition following the release of the song "Lollipop Lagelu" in 2008.

In addition to his work in Bhojpuri cinema, Singh has recorded songs for Hindi and other Indian-language productions. He entered electoral politics in 2024, when he contested the 2024 Indian general election as an independent candidate from the Karakat Lok Sabha constituency after withdrawing as the Bharatiya Janata Party's nominee for the Asansol Lok Sabha constituency.

== Early life and education ==
Pawan Singh was born in Arrah, Bihar, India, in 1986. He attended primary school in Kolkata before returning to Arrah, where he completed his intermediate education at H.N.K. High School. He graduated from Maharaja College, Arrah.

== Career ==
Singh's first album was Odhaniya Wali, released in 2000.. He made his acting debut in the 2006 film Rangli Chunariya Tohre Naam. In 2008, Singh released the album Lollipop Lageli, which included the song "Lollipop Lagelu." The same year, he released another album, Don't Touch My Body, featuring the song "Saniya Mirza Cut Nathuniya."

He made his acting debut in the 2006 film Rangli Chunariya Tohre Naam. In 2020, he made his Bollywood debut with the song "Kamariya Hila Rahi Hai" featuring American dancer and actress Lauren Gottlieb. His second Bollywood single was "Babuni Tere Rang Me", a Holi song featuring Tridha Choudhury, followed by "Current" featuring Payal Dev. In 2021, he recorded a Chhath song with Sonu Nigam and released Bhojpuri cover versions of popular Bollywood songs like "Lut Gaye (Bhojpuri)" and "Barish Ban Jana". He later released a remake of the Hindi song "Tumsa Koi Pyara" from the film Khuddar (1994) in Bhojpuri. His next Bhojpuri single, "Zindagi", was a collaboration with Haryanvi singer Renuka Panwar.

He also sang in several Hindi films including Stree 2 and Vicky Vidya Ka Woh Wala Video. Singh was nominated for the Filmfare Award for Best Male Playback Singer for his rendition of "Aayi Nai" and won the TOIFA 2025 Song of the Year award. Pawan Singh is set to feature in the upcoming film Dacoit: A Love Story. The film's most anticipated track, "Touch Buddy" (known as "Chicchubuddi" in Telugu), is a collaboration with Jonita Gandhi, featuring music by Bheems Ceciroleo. He received the Best Male Singer Award at the International Bhojpuri Film Awards in 2016.

In Bhojpuri cinema, Singh has appeared in films such as Pratigya (2008), Bajrang, Satya (2017), Crack Fighter (2019), Raja (2019), Sher Singh (2019), Maa Tujhe Salaam (2018), Jai Hind, Maine Unko Sajan Chun Liya, Tabadala, Dhadkan, Powerstar, Mera Bharat Mahaan (2022), Pawan Raja, Sarkar Raj, and Har Har Gange (2023). Singh has so far worked in more than 250 films in the Bhojpuri film industry.

== Political career ==
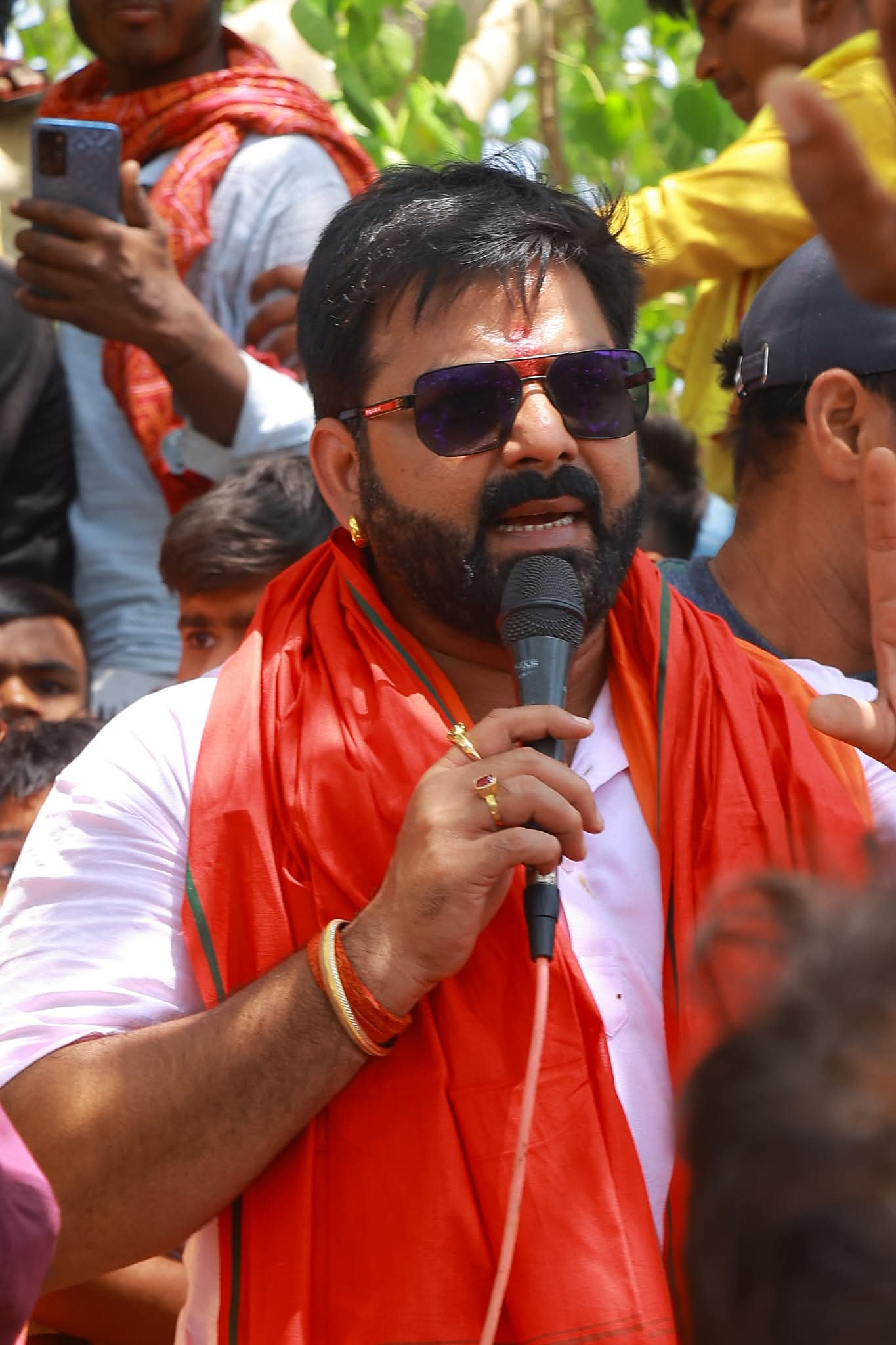
Pawan Singh at a political rally.

Pawan Singh entered politics ahead of the 2024 Indian general election, where he was chosen as the Bharatiya Janata Party (BJP) candidate for the Asansol Lok Sabha constituency in West Bengal. Within days of the announcement, he withdrew his candidacy, citing personal reasons.

In May 2024, he was subsequently expelled from the BJP after announcing his candidacy as an independent candidate for the Karakat Lok Sabha constituency in Bihar, opposing the party's official nominee Upendra Kushwaha. The BJP cited his actions as failing to comply with party discipline.

His campaign in Karakat included public rallies with musical performances. His candidacy received mixed responses. Supporters described him as representing the youth and the Bhojpuri-speaking population, while critics expressed concerns about his lack of political experience and the potential for vote splitting. He did not win the election, but commentators noted that the campaign raised his political profile in Bihar.

On 1 October 2025, Singh rejoined the BJP in the presence of Union Home Minister Amit Shah, BJP president J. P. Nadda, BJP Bihar in-charge Vinod Tawde and Upendra Kushwaha.

In June 2026, Singh was nominated by the Bharatiya Janata Party (BJP) as a candidate for the Bihar Legislative Council elections.

== Personal life ==
Pawan Singh married Neelam Singh in 2014; she died by suicide in March 2015.

In 2019, actress Akshara Singh filed a first information report (FIR) against Pawan Singh. According to the complaint, she alleged threats and inappropriate social media posts following their separation.

In March 2018, he married Jyoti Singh, a resident of Ballia, Uttar Pradesh. In October 2021, Jyoti filed for divorce, alleging domestic abuse and marital disputes. She also claimed that he forced her to undergo abortions after their marriage. The divorce case included disputes over alimony and property settlement, with reports suggesting Jyoti demanded financial compensation and a residence, while Pawan offered a smaller settlement.

In September 2025, Singh faced legal issues in Varanasi after a complaint was filed alleging that he had cheated a hotelier out of ₹15.7 million in connection with investments in the 2018 Bhojpuri film, Boss. The court directed the police to register a case under multiple sections of the Indian Penal Code.

On Pawan Singh's 40th birthday, a video surfaced allegedly showing the Bhojpuri star appearing to be intoxicated and making controversial remarks. The video, which quickly went viral, sparked widespread criticism and drew attention from his fans and critics alike. He has yet to publicly comment on the incident.

== Filmography ==
Key
†	Denotes films that have not yet been released

=== Bhojpuri films ===
Year	Title	Role	Notes
2004	Rangilee Chunariya Tohre Naam		
2008	Bhojpuriya Daroga		
2008	Pratigya		
2009	Saiya ke Sath Madaiya Mai		
2009	Jogiji Dhire Dhire		
2009	Tu Jaan Hau Hamaar		
2009	Umariya Kaili Tohre Naam		
2009	Pyar Bina Chain Kaha		
2009	Odhaniya Kamal Kare		
2010	Pawan Purwaiya		
2010	Daraar		
2010	Devra Bada Satawela		
2011	Ladai La Akhiya Ye Launde Raja		
2011	Doli Chadhake Dulhin Sasural Chali		
2011	Rangbaj Daroga		
2011	Kanoon Hamara Muththi Me		
2011	Bhagjogani		
2011	Chorwa Banal Damad		
2011	Dewar Bhabhi		
2011	Hamara Mati Mai Dum Ba		
2011	Gundai Raj		
2012	Sindur Dan		
2012	Jab Kehu Dil Me Sama Jala		
2012	Saugandh Ganga Maiya Ke		
2012	Rangbaz Raja		
2012	Jung		
2012	Bhaiya Ke Sali Odhaniya Wali		
2012	Ek Duje Ke Liye		
2013	Banaras Wali		
2013	Ziddi Aashiq		
2013	Bajrang		
2013	Truck Driver		
2013	Katta Tanal Duppta Par		
2013	Dakait		
2013	Desh Pradesh		
2013	Khoon Pashina		
2013	Lawarish		
2013	Veer Balwan		
2013	Andhi Tufaan		
2013	Ek Aur Kuruksheta		
2014	Karele Kamal Dharti ke Lal		
2014	Saiyaji Dilwa Mangale		
2014	Yodhaa		
2014	Pratigya 2		
2014	Baazigar		
2014	Pyar Mohabbat Zindabad		
2014	Insaaf		
2014	Lebu Ka Jaan		
2014	Thok Deb		
2015	Nahale Pe Dahala		
2015	Bin Bajaye Sapera		
2015	Karz Virasat Ke		
2015	Band Baja Leke Aaja Pawan Raja		
2015	Lagi Chhute Na Rama		
2015	Sangram		
2015	Gangaputra		
2015	Hukumat		
2015	Suhaag		
2015	Baaj Gail Danka		
2015	Mukabala		
2015	Khoon Ka Ilzaam		
2016	Bhojpuriya Raja		
2016	Gadar		
2016	Tridev		
2016	Ziddi		
2017	Sarkar Raj		
2017	Satya	Satya	
2017	Tere Jaisa Yaar Kahan		
2017	Tabadala		
2017	Dhadkan		
2017	Challenge		
2017	Yodhaa Arjun Pandit		
2018	Saiya Super Star		
2018	Wanted		
2018	Maa Tujhe Salaam		
2018	Balmua Tohre Khatir		
2018	Loha Pahalwan		
2018	Raja	Raja	
2019	Crack Fighter	Super Singh/Shankar Singh	
2019	Maine Unko Sajan Chun Liya	Vijau	
2019	Jai Hind		
2019	Sher Singh		
2021	Ghatak		
2021	Boss	Vishwa	
2021	Hum Hai Raahi Pyar ke		
2022	Mera Bharat Mahaan		
2022	Pyari Chandani		
2022	Kaise Ho Jala Pyar		
2022	Dharma		
2023	Har Har Gange	Gangu	
2025	Sooryavansham		
2025	Powerstar	Powerstar	
TBA	Jiyo Meri Jaan †		

=== Other language films ===
Year	Title	Language	Notes	Ref.
2024	Vicky Vidya Ka Woh Wala Video	Hindi	Cameo appearance in the song in the song "Chumma"	
2026	Dacoit: A Love Story	Telugu; Hindi	Bilingual film. Cameo appearance in the song "Touch Buddy" (Hindi) / "Chicchubuddi" (Telugu)	
TBA	Sirf Aapke †	Hindi		

=== Television ===
Year	Show	Role	Notes	Ref
2017	Entertainment Ki Raat	Special Guest	With Ravi Kishan, Guru Randhawa and Sargun Mehta	
2019	The Kapil Sharma Show	Special Appearance	With Dinesh Lal Yadav "Nirahua", Kajal Raghwani, Amrapali Dubey and Nidhi Jha	
2025	Rise and Fall	Guest Appearance	Walked out for Bihar Assembly Elections and Navratri Song	
2025	I-Popstar	Guest Appearance	Pawan Singh had gone as a super judge.	
2025	Laughter Chefs Session 03	Celebrity Guest		
2025	Bigg Boss 19	Celebrity Guest	Pawan Singh went to the Grand Finale as a celebrity guest.	
2026	Great Indian Kapil Sharma Show	With Manoj Tiwari and Dinesh Lal Yadav "Nirahua"	Talk show on Netflix	
2026	Bhojpuri Bawaal	Himself	Colors TV/ Jio Hostar	

=== Web series ===
Year	Title	Role	Notes	Ref.
2021	Prapanch	Upendra		

== Awards ==
Year	Award	Category	Work	Result	Ref.
2016	International Bhojpuri Film Awards	Best Male Singer		Won	
2016	Dadasaheb Phalke Film Foundation Award	Special Award		Won	
2017	International Bhojpuri Film Awards	Best Actor		Won	
2017	International Bhojpuri Film Awards	Best Male Singer		Won	
2018	International Bhojpuri Film Awards	Most Popular Actor		Won	
2019	International Bhojpuri Film Awards	Best Actor	Maa Tujhe Salaam	Won	
2019	International Bhojpuri Film Awards	Best Playback Singer (Male)	Bhagwan Badi Fursat Se (from Maa Tujhe Salaam)	Won	
2025	70th Filmfare Awards	Best Playback Singer (Male)	Aayi Nai (from Stree 2)	Nominated	
2025	TOIFA 2025	Song of the Year	Aayi Nai (from Stree 2)	Won	
2026	Zee Bhojpuri Awards	Best Playback Singer (Male)		Won	

== See also ==
- List of songs recorded by Pawan Singh
