= Kalpana Patowary =

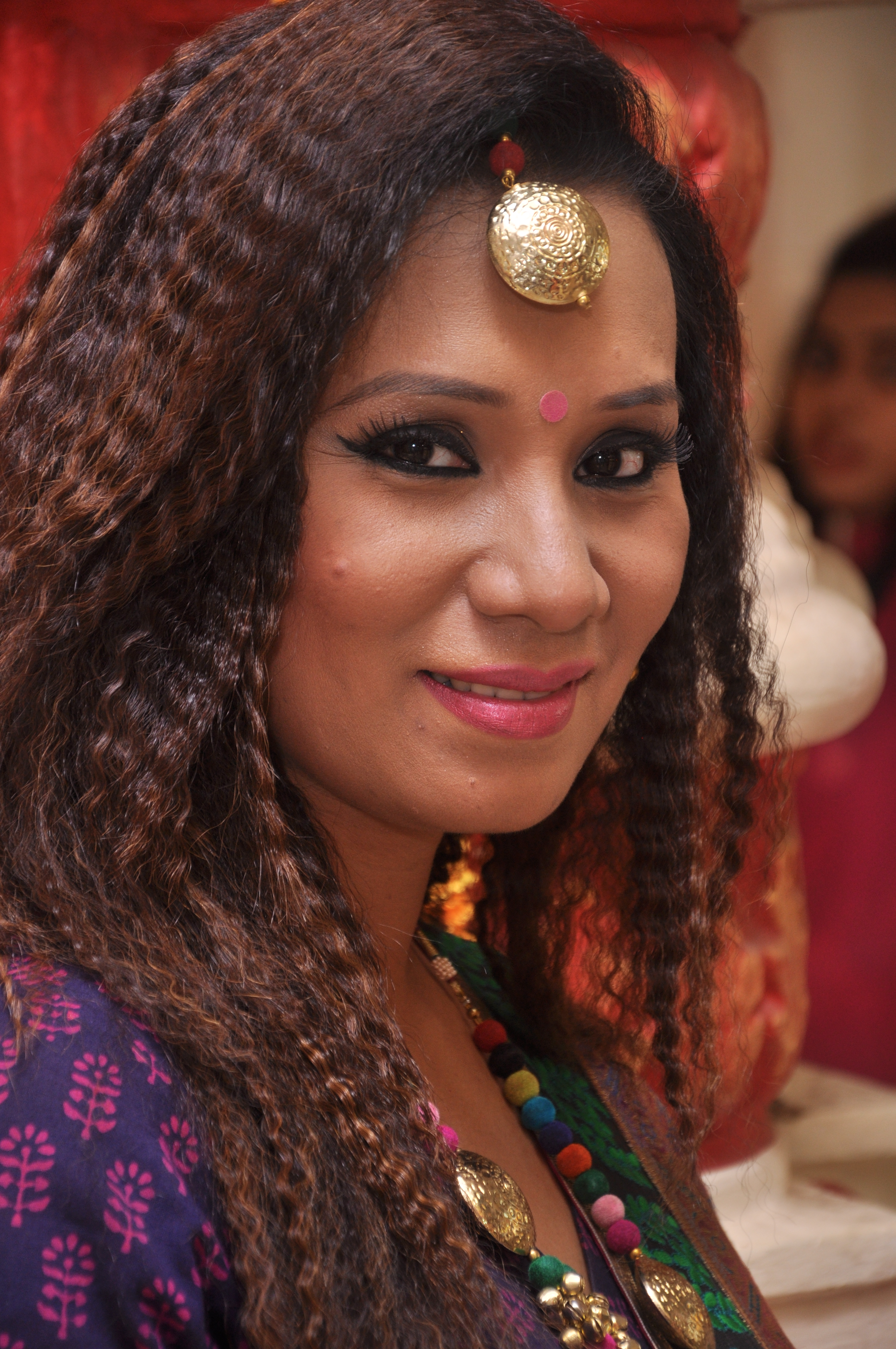
- Kalpana Patowary
- Born: Sorbhog, Assam, India
- Other names: Kalpana; Bhojpuri Queen
- Education: Cotton University; Bhatkhande Music Institute
- Occupations: Singer; Politician; Actress
- Years active: 1993–present
- Political party: Asom Gana Parishad (2020–present)
- Other political affiliations: Bharatiya Janata Party (2018–2020)
- Spouse: Parvez Khan
- Children: 2
- Awards: Bihar Kala Samman (2023–24)
- Musical career
- Origin: Assam
- Genres: Indian Classical; Bhojpuri music; Assamese music; Primitive-acoustic folk; Jazz; Ghazal; Electronic fusion; Playback
- Instrument: Vocals
- Label: Music Box

Kalpana Patowary, also credited professionally as Kalpana, is an Indian folk and playback singer and politician from Assam. She has recorded songs and folk music in several Indian languages, with Bhojpuri being the major genre. Due to her contribution to Bhojpuri music, she is often referred to by the moniker "Bhojpuri Queen".

Patowary embarked on her career at the age of 4 and received further training from Ustad Ghulam Mustafa Khan ,Dipen Roy and Shikha Dutta for Sangeet Bisharad in Hindustani Classical Music at Bhatkhande Sangeet Vishwavidyalaya, Lucknow. She has sung in more than 32 languages, including Bhojpuri, Assamese, Hindi, Marathi, Bengali, and English, throughout her solo musical journey.

== Early life and background ==
" Music barons in India were left gaping when Kalpana Patowary, a singer of Indian folk music, was signed on by British recording company Virgin EMI Records in April. They were all the more surprised to see the soaring international demand for her Bhojpuri music album with songs about migration. It seems Bhojpuri folk songs on migration are witnessing resurgence on an unexpected scale."

Patowary was born in a Yogi-Nath Rudraja Brahmin family of Natha Sampradaya community in Barpeta district in Assam. A graduate in English literature, Patowary is an alumnus of Cotton College of Guwahati. Trained in Kamrupiya and Goalporiya folk music by her folksinger father Sri Bipin Nath Patowary, Kalpana started to publicly perform at the age of 4 with her father and is also trained as Sangeet Visharad in Indian classical music from Bhatkhande Music Institute University, Lucknow. She sings many forms of Bhojpuri folk music including Purvi, Pachra, Kajri, Sohar, Vivaah geet, Chaita, and Nautanki.

Patowary has worked exclusively on the lost traditions of Bhikhari Thakur in Bihar and has released several songs reinventing and commemorating his life and work.

== Career ==
Patowary holds the distinction of being the inaugural Bhojpuri singer to introduce the age-old Khadi Birha tradition to international platforms.

In 2013, Patowary featured in the documentary film Bidesia in Bambai, released on 8 December. The documentary provides a perspective on Mumbai through the eyes of migrant workers and their music.

She received an invitation to perform during a 15-day tour across four Latin American countries, arranged by the Ministry of Cultural Affairs to commemorate Indian Arrival Day.

Patowary's pioneering accomplishment as the first woman was to record and sing in the Chhaprahiya Purvi style, a genre previously dominated by male artists.

Patowary marked her acting debut in the Bhojpuri movie "Chalat Musafir Moh Liyo Re," portraying the character of Janki alongside co-star Dinesh Lal Yadav.

In September 2025, Patowary was awarded the Bihar Kala Samman(National Award) 2023–24 by the Government of Bihar for her contribution to Bhojpuri music and arts. In August 2026, Patowary was honoured with the Pandit Rajkumar Shukla Kala Shikhar Samman by Bihar Chief Minister Samrat Choudhary for her musical travelogue Champaran Satyagraha, featuring the song "Tinkathiya Neel Kheti."

== Political career ==
On 12 July 2018, Patowary became a member of the BJP in a ceremony graced by the presence of its president, Amit Shah, and Bihar Deputy Chief Minister Sushil Modi in Patna.

On 9 October 2020, Patowary affiliated herself with the Asom Gana Parishad during an event conducted at the party's headquarters in Guwahati.. She also served as the cultural chairperson of the party from November 2020 during the election campaign. In the 2021 Assam Assembly election, Patowary contested as a candidate representing the Asom Gana Parishad from the Sarukheri constituency, where the incumbent MLA Jakir Hussain Sikdar defeated her.

== Discography ==
Denotes films that have not yet been released

=== Bhojpuri film songs ===
Year	Song	Film	Composer	Co-singer
2005	"Mehangaai Jaisen"	Mai Re Kar De Bidai Humar		
2005	"Dulha Milal Dildar"	Dulha Milal Dildar		Udit Narayan
2005	"Ab Ta Ehe Armaan"	Dulha Milal Dildar		Udit Narayan
2005	"Chal Chal Kahi Pyar Kare"	Dulha Milal Dildar		Udit Narayan
2005	"Lel Lel Ae Raja Ji"	Dulha Milal Dildar		
2006	"Aise Je Saj ke Sawar ke"	Rangli Chunariya Tohre Naam		Pawan Singh
2006	"Tani Aaja Kurta Khol Ke"	Rangli Chunariya Tohre Naam		Pawan Singh
2025	""Lawang Latiya"	Rishtey		Khesari Lal Yadav

=== Hindi film songs ===
Year	Song	Film	Composer	Co-singer
2007	"Ek Sapna (Remix)"	Stumped	Dhrubajyoti Phukan	
2007	"Tere Layee"	Fool & Final	Himesh Reshammiya	Kunal Ganjawala
2007	"Uncha Lamba Kad"	Welcome	Anand Raj Anand	Anand Raj Anand
2009	"Billu Bhayankar"	Billu	Ajay Jhingran, Raghuveer	
2009	"Hotty Naughty (Remix)"	De Dana Dan	Pritam	
2010	"Tikhi Tikhi Mirch (Folk Version)"	Mirch	Monty Sharma	
2010	"Isak Se Meetha Kuch Bhi"	Aakrosh	Pritam	Ajay Jhingran
2010	"Shakira"	No Problem	Pritam	Master Saleem, Hard Kaur
2010	"Babe Di Kripa"	No Problem	Pritam	Vikrant Singh
2010	"Aila Re Aila"	Khatta Meetha	Pritam	Daler Mehndi
2013	"Gandi Baat"	R... Rajkumar	Pritam	Mika Singh
2016	"Mona Ka Tona"	Dhara 302	Sahil Multy Khan	
2016	"Dono Aankho Ka Shutter"	Khel Toh Ab Shuru Hoga	Ashfaque	
2017	"O Re Kaharo"	Begum Jaan	Anu Malik	Altamash Faridi
2017	"Pyar Ka Test"	Running Shaadi	Abhishek-Akshay	Bappi Lahiri
2018	"Jeans Pant Aur Choli"	Ishqeria	Papon	Papon
2018	"Yaadein"	Ishqeria	Papon	Papon

=== Marathi film songs ===
Year	Song	Films	Composer	Co-singer
2016	"Kalana"	Taleem	Praful Karlekar, Nitin Madhukar Rokade	

=== Assamese film songs ===
Year	Song	Films	Composer	Co-singer
2000	"Soku Lotokere"	Asene Kunuba Hiyat	Manuj Sarmah	Zubeen Garg
2002	"Neela Neela"	Kanyadaan	Zubeen Garg	Zubeen Garg
2004	"Priya O Priya" (Sunday Holiday Closing Day)	Antaheen Jatra	Dr. Hitesh Baruah	Zubeen Garg, Sagarika
2013	"I am Sexy"	Ranangan	Nipon Chutia	Solo
2015	"Nonsense Hridoye"	Ahetuk	Poran Borkatoky (JoJo)	Solo
2016	"Maatal Ei Rati"	Bahniman	Jatin Sharma	Zubeen Garg

=== Bengali film songs ===
Year	Song	Films	Composer	Co-singer
2007	"Dhukupuku Buk"	Minister Fatakeshto	Jeet Gannguli	Solo
2010	"Jhum Jhum Ja"	Target	Jeet Gannguli	Jeet Gannguli
2010	"Ki Je Aagun"	Target	Jeet Gannguli	Solo
2011	"Koka Kola"	Faande Poriya Boga Kaande Re	Samidh Mukerjee	Samidh Mukerjee
2012	"Madhubala"	Macho Mastana	Samidh Mukerjee	Solo
2015	"Chain Kahan Prabhu Bina"	Har Har Byomkesh	Bickram Ghosh	Solo
2016	"Aata Geche"	Angaar	Akassh	Solo
2016	"3G"	Hero 420	Savvy Gupta	Nakash Aziz

=== Kannada film songs ===
Year	Songs	Films	Composer	Co-singer
2003	"Sweetu Rasagolla"	Lankesh Patrike	Babji-Sandeep	
2007	"Magalu Doddavaladalu"	Ee Preethi Yeke Bhoomi Melide	R. P. Patnaik	C. Ashwath, Prem
2010	"Jarthaari Seere"	Jothegara	Sujeeth Shetty	Udit Narayan

== Filmography ==
=== Films ===
Year	Film	Role	Language	Co-star	Director	Notes	Ref
2006	Chalat Musafir Moh Liyo Re	Janki	Bhojpuri	Dinesh Lal Yadav	Manoj Ojha	Lead, credited as Kalpana	
2013	Bidesia in Bambai	Self	Bhojpuri, Hindi		Surabhi Sharma	Documentary	
2015	Har Har Byomkesh	Singer	Bengali		Arindam Sil	Special appearance	

=== Television ===
Year	Title	Role	Platform	Notes	Ref.
2008	Junoon - Kuchh Kar Dikhaane Ke	Contestant	NDTV Imagine	Reality show	
