= Dinesh Lal Yadav =

Indian actor, singer and politician (born 1979)

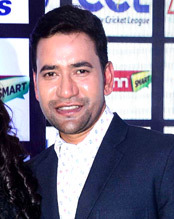
- Yadav in 2022

Member of Parliament, Lok Sabha
- In office 26 June 2022 – 4 June 2024
- Preceded by: Akhilesh Yadav
- Succeeded by: Dharmendra Yadav
- Constituency: Azamgarh

Personal details
- Born: Dinesh Lal Yadav; 2 February 1979 (age 47) Ghazipur, Uttar Pradesh, India
- Party: Bharatiya Janata Party
- Occupation: Actor • singer • host • politician

Dinesh Lal Yadav (born 2 February 1979), popularly known as Nirahua, is an Indian actor, singer, producer and politician who works in Bhojpuri-language films. He is among the most successful Bhojpuri actors, with several consecutive box-office successes in 2015. He owns the production house Nirahua Entertainment Pvt Ltd. Dinesh Lal Yadav was a contestant on Bigg Boss 6 in 2012.

Nirahua was a member of parliament from Azamgarh Lok Sabha constituency as a member of the Bharatiya Janata Party from 2022 till 2024. Coming from a family of traditional Biraha singers of Ghazipur, he began his career as a folk singer with the album Nirahua Satal Rahe (2003), which became a major hit and earned him the stage name "Nirahua". He made his film debut in the Bhojpuri drama Humka Aisa Waisa Na Samjha (2006) and gained wider fame with Chalat Mushafir Moh Liyo Re (2006), Nirahua Rikshaw Wala (2008) and Pratigya (2008).

In 2012, he appeared with Amitabh Bachchan and Jaya Bachchan in Ganga Devi and also participated in Bigg Boss 6 that year. His fiftieth film, Nirahua Hindustani (2014), was a commercial success that reached multiplex audiences. He later starred in patriotic films such as Patna Se Pakistan (2015) and Border (2018), two of the highest-grossing Bhojpuri films. His Nirahua Chalal London (2019) was shot in London, and in 2019 he made his OTT debut in the Bhojpuri web series Hero Vardiwala.

== Early life ==
Nirahua was born to Kumar Yadav and Chandrajyoti Yadav. He has a brother, Pravesh Lal Yadav, and a sister, Lalita Yadav.

He spent most of his childhood days in "Belghoria" at 4 no. railway gate (Agarpara) area of Kolkata where his father worked in a factory. He completed his education in the same suburbs of Kolkata.

He comes from a family of famous Biraha folk singers hailing from Ghazipur. Famous Biraha singer Vijay Lal Yadav known as "Biraha Samrat" and writer and lyricist Pyare Lal Yadav (Kaviji) who has penned many songs in Bhojpuri cinema, are his first cousins.

== Acting career ==
=== Early hits and establishment (2006–2011) ===
He started his acting career with the Bhojpuri film Humka Aisa Waisa Na Samjha (Don't think that I'm riff-raff) in 2006 in which he played the role of a boy who fights to make Bhojpuri a recognised language in the state. But his first released movie was Chalat Musafir Moh Liyo Re (The traveller has been ensnared) in which he played the supporting role of a police inspector with Kalpana Patowary and Sunil Chhaila Bihari. His third film was Ho Gail Ba Pyar Odhaniya Waali Se (I have fallen in love with a girl wearing stole, 2007). After this film, he received many offers. His next film Nirahua Rikshawala (2007) became a super hit. After the success of his another film titled Kahan Jaiba Raja Najariya Ladaike (2007), he was an established actor in the industry and had got the title "Jublee Star". His another hit movie in 2008 was Lagal Raha Ae Rajaji. His natural acting style, slim body unlike other Bhojpuri actor those days, and action moves due to his Karate training in his childhood, made him so popular among the audience that even his flop films used to run over three weeks. He also did stage shows in Fiji, Australia and New Zealand in 2007.

He continued giving hits likes Pratigya (2008), Pariwaar (2008), Nirahua No. 1 (2009), Saat Saheliyan (2010), Nirahua Chalal Sasural (2011). In a review of his film Aulaad (2011), Times of India wrote that "Dinesh Lal Yadav has live up his role".

=== TV debut and high budget films (2012–2018) ===
In 2012, he appeared in the Bigg Boss as a contestant. His film Ganga Jamuna Saraswati (2012) earned 12.5 million in just three weeks which highest by any Bhojpuri movie in those times. He acted with Amitabh Bachchan, Jaya Bachchan and Gulshan Grover in the Bhojpuri film Ganga Devi (2012). His fiftieth project Nirahua Hindustani (2014) reached multiplexes. Another of his hit movies was Patna Se Pakistan. In 2016, he received Uttar Pradesh's highest civilian award "Yash Bharti Samman Award" by the Uttar Pradesh Government for this contribution in Bhojpuri films.

Bam Bam Bol Raha Hai Kashi (2016) was produced by Priyanka Chopra. Nirahua Hindustani 2 won eleven awards at Sabrang Film Awards. His Kashi Amarnath (2018) was another movie that was produced by Priyanka Chopra. Grossing 190 million, his patriotic film Border (2018) is one of the highest earning Bhojpuri films ever.

=== OTT debut and other films (2019–present) ===
In made his OTT debut in 2019 with Hero Vardiwala, which was the first webseries ever made in Bhojpuri language. He released his first short film Kukkur in 2021 which was based on the plight of elderly people in old-age homes. On 10 December 2021, his film Hum Hain Dulha Hindustani released, which was a Romantic comedy film starring Amrapali Dubey and Madhu Sharma. This was Nirahua's second film that was shot in London after Nirahua Chalal London. On 1 January 2022, he released his next short film Dahar. He played the role of a Launda in his next film "Naach Baiju Naach" which was released in September.

== Political career ==
Nirahua joined politics by becoming a member of the Bharatiya Janata Party in Lucknow on 27 March 2019 in presence of Uttar Pradesh chief minister Yogi Adityanath. On 3 April 2019 he was declared a candidate to contest the 2019 Indian Lok Sabha election from Azamgarh constituency from Bharatiya Janata Party. He unsuccessfully faced Akhilesh Yadav, the former chief minister of Uttar Pradesh. He lost against Akhilesh Yadav by a margin of 259,874 votes.

In 2022 bypolls from Azamgarh constituency, he defeated Samajwadi Party candidate Dharmendra Yadav by a margin of 8,700 votes.

== Personal life ==
He married Mansha Yadav in the year 2000. The couple has two sons, Aditya Yadav, Amit Yadav and one daughter, Aditi Yadav.

Yadav is also rumoured to be simultaneously married to co-actor Amrapali Dubey.

=== Controversy ===
In 2025, he criticized fellow Bhojpuri actor Khesari Lal Yadav, over remarks regarding the Ram Mandir, which sparked controversy over caste and communal remarks. He further claimed, as reported by The Economic Times, "true Yadavs proudly stand with Lord Ram and the NDA's development agenda".

== Filmography ==
=== Films ===
Key
†	Denotes films that have not yet been released

Year	Film	Role	Notes	References
2006	Humka Aisa Waisa Na Samjha			
2006	Chalat Musafir Moh Liyo Re	Nirahua		
2007	Ho Gail Ba Pyar Odhaniya Wali se			
2007	Bidesiya	Sanehi		
2008	Nirahuwa Rikshaw Wala	Nirahua		
2008	Pratigya	Suraj		
2008	Pariwar	Kishan		
2008	Ho Gaini Deewana Tohra Pyar Me			
2008	Lagal Raha Ae Rajaji			
2008	Vidhata	Kishan		
2008	Chalani Ke Chalal Dulha	Special appearance		
2008	Kahan Jaiba Raja Nazariya Ladaike	Raja		
2008	Rang De Basanti Chola			
2009	Khiladi No. 1			
2009	Rangeela Babu			
2009	Nirahua No. 1	Nirahua		
2010	Shiva	Shiva		
2010	Saat Saheliyan	Nirahua		
2010	Aaj Ke Karan Arjun			
2010	Dil	Chitrus		
2011	Dushmani			
2011	Aulaad	Radhe		
2011	Nirahua Chalal Sasural	Nirahua		
2011	Nirahua Mail	Nirahua		
2012	Ganga Jamuna Saraswati	Saraswati		
2012	Ganga Devi			
2013	Rakhwala	Satyaprakash/Sarfaraj		
2013	Ek Duje Ke Liye	Raj/Raju		
2014	Nirahua Banal Don	Nirahua		
2014	Nirahua Hindustani	Nirahua		
2014	Hathkadi	Jailer Shakti Singh		
2015	Patna Se Pakistan	Kabir		
2015	Nirahua Rickshawala 2	Aaditya/Nirahua		
2015	Raja Babu	Vicky/Raja Babu		
2015	Biwi No.1	Anand		
2015	Jigarwala	Rahul		
2015	Ghulami	Abhimanyu		
2016	Aashik Aawara	Raja/Deepak		
2016	Bam Bam Bol Raha Hai Kashi	Kashi		
2016	Nirahua Chalal Sasural 2	Nirahua		
2016	Aakhiri Rasta			
2016	Ram Lakhan	Ram Yadav		
2016	Mokama 0 K.M.			
2017	Nirahu Satal Rahe	Nirahua		
2017	Jigar	Deva		
2017	Sipahi			
2017	Nirahua Hindustani 2	Nirahu Yadav		
2017	Kashi Amarnath	Kashi		
2018	Saugandh	Raju		
2018	Border	Abhay Shashtri		
2018	Nirahua Hindustani 3	Nirahua		
2018	Nirahua Chalal London	Nirahua		
2019	Sher-E-Hindustan	Arjun		
2019	Saiyan Ji Dagabaaz			
2019	Jai Veeru	Jai		
2019	Lallu Ki Laila	Lallu		
2020	Muqaddar Ka Sikandar			
2020	Romeo Raza			
2022	Hum Hain Dulha Hindustani			
2022	Aaye Hum Baarati Baarat Leke			
2022	Naach Baiju Naach	Baiju		
2022	Gabbroo	Vihaan		
2022	Sabka Baap Angutha Chhap			
2022	Raja Doli Leke Aaja	Raja		
2023	Maai: Pride of Bhojpuri			
2025	Mere Husband Ki Shadi Hai			
2025	Hamar Naam Вa Kanhaiya			
2025	Jugal Master			
2025	Balma Bada Nadan 2			
2025	Govardhan †	TBA		
2022	Nirahua The Leader †	TBA		
2022	Aayi Milan Ki Raat †	TBA		
2023	Nirahua Chalal Sasural 3 †	TBA		Filming
2023	Fasal †	TBA		
2023	Nirahua Hindustani 4 †	TBA		
2024	Hey Ramji †	TBA		
2025	Ajey: The Untold Story of a Yogi	TBA	Hindi films	
2026	Bhabiji Ghar Par Hain! Fun on the Run	Bacho Bhaiya	Hindi films	
2026	Vibe	Bansi	Hindi films	

=== Short films ===
Year	Title (Note: Films are listed in the order of their release date.)	Role	Language	Ref.
2021	Bharat		Hindi	
2021	Kukkur		Bhojpuri	
2022	Dahar		Bhojpuri	

=== Web series ===
Year	Title	Role	Language	Platform	Notes
2019	Hero Vardiwala	Tejaswi Pratap Singh	Bhojpuri	ALTBalaji	
2023	Scam 2003	Pramod Jaisingh	Hindi	SonyLIV	
2026	Maamla Legal Hai	Banaspati	Hindi	Netflix	
2026	Gram Chikitsalay	Babu Sahab	Hindi	Prime Video	

== Television ==
Year	Name	Role	Channel	Notes	Ref
2012	Bigg Boss 6	Contestant	Colors TV	Entered Day 1, Evicted Day 8; Re-entered Day 42, Re-evicted Day 66.	
2026–	Bhojpuri Bawaal	Himself	Colors TV/ Jio Hotstar		

== Awards ==
Ceremony	Category	Year	Film	Result	Reference
International Bhojpuri Film Awards	Best Actor	2018	Nirahua Hindustani 2	Won	
International Bhojpuri Film Awards	Jublee Star Award	2017		Won	
International Bhojpuri Film Awards	Best Actor	2016	Patna Se Pakistan	Won	

== See also ==
- List of Yadavs

== Notes ==
Lok Sabha
Preceded by Akhilesh Yadav	Member of Parliament for Azamgarh; 2022–present	Incumbent
