= Sabrang Film Awards =

Bhojpuri Film Award

- Sabrang Film Awards 2018 Logo Poster
- Awarded for: Bhojpuri Film
- Sponsored by: Popular Group of Hospitals; Krishna Sudama Education Group; (2019)
- Date: 2014
- Location: Mumbai
- Country: India
- Presented by: Godrej Consumer Products Limited (2019)
- Hosted by: Awdhesh Mishra (2018-2019); Smrity Sinha (2018-2019); Ritu Singh (2016,2019); Yash Kumarr (2017); Sunil Sawra (2017); Priyesh Singh (2016)
- First award: 2014
- Final award: 2019

Highlights
- Most awards: Sangharsh (11)
- Best Actor (Male): Khesari Lal Yadav (2); Dinesh Lal Yadav (2)
- Website: sabrangfilmawards.com

Television/radio coverage
- Network: Oscar Movies Bhojpuri
- Produced by: Kuldeep Srivastav

The Sabrang Film Awards is an awards ceremony recognising the best of Bhojpuri cinema. The awards have been presented annually since 2014.

== Awards ==
The awards are given for the following categories: Best Film, Best Director, Best Actor, Best Actress, Best Supporting Actress, Best Actor in a Negative Role, Best Actor in a Comic Role, Best Debutant Director, among others.

=== Sabrang Film Awards 2019 ===
Sabrang 2019 was held on 4 September 2019 at Atharva College, Malad (Mumbai) and the show was hosted by Awadhesh Mishra, Smrity Sinha, Ritu Singh and Sonalika Prasad. The show was presented by "Godrej Expert Rich Cream"; and the associate sponsors were "Popular Group of Hospitals" and "Krishna Sudama Education Group".

==== Popular awards ====
Category	Recipient(s)
Best Actor (Male)	Khesari Lal Yadav for Sangharsh
Best Actor (Female)	Kajal Raghwani for Sangharsh
Best Actor (Critics)	Ravi Kishan for Sanki Daroga
Best Actress (Critics)	Nidhi Jha for Gangster Dulhania
Best Director	Parag Patil for Sangharsh
Best Director (Critics)	Lal Babu Pandit for Rajajani
Best Debutant Director	Ritesh Thakur for Chana Jor Garam
Best Story	Rakesh Tripathi for Sangharsh
Best Film	Sangharsh
Best Film (Critics)	Rajajani
Best Debutant Actor	Pramod Premi Yadav for Chana Jor Garam
Best Debutant Actress	Priti Biswas for Rajajani
Best Actor In A Negative Role	Dev Singh for Rajajani
Best Actress In A Negative Role	J Neelam for Rajajani
Best Actor In A Comic Role	Manoj Tiger for Halfa Macha Ke Gail
Best Performance In A Supporting Role (Male)	Awdhesh Mishra for Sangharsh
Best Performance In A Supporting Role (Female)	Reena Rani for Sangharsh
Most Popular Film	Maa Tujhe Salaam
Most Popular Director	Aslam Sheikh for Maa Tujhe Salaam
Most Popular Pair	Khesari Lal Yadav & Kajal Raghwani
Best Rising Superstar	Kanak Pandey
Most Versatile Actor	Yash Kumar Mishra
Most Versatile Actress	Kajal Yadav
Best Child Artist	Kriti Yadav for Dulhan Ganga Paar Ke

==== Musical awards ====
Category	Recipient(s)
Best Music Director	Om Jha for Balam Ji Love You
Best Lyrics	Azad Singh for Balam Ji Love You
Best Playback Singer (Male)	Khesari Lal Yadav for Sangharsh
Best Playback Singer (Female)	Priyanka Singh for Balam Ji Love You
Most Popular Singer (Female)	Priyanka Singh for Mehandi Laga Ke Rakhna
Best Background Score	Aslam Surti for Sangharsh
Best Music Company	Worldwide Records
Most Popular Folk Singer	Mohan Rathore
Most Popular Album Singer	Samar Singh

==== Technical awards ====
Category	Recipient(s)
Best Action	S Mallesh for Dulhan Chahi Pakistan Se 2
Best Choreography	Kanu Mukharji for Nirahua Hindustani 3
Best Cinematography	R. R. Prince for Sangharsh
Best Costume Design	Badshah Khan for Sangharsh
Best Dialogue	Surendra Mishra for Maa Tujhe Salaam
Best Editing	Preetam Naik for Maa Tujhe Salaam
Best Screenplay	Aslam Sheikh & Ishtiyaq Sheikh Bunty for Maa Tujhe Salaam
Best Art Director	Vijay Das for Bairi Kangana 2
Best Publicity Designer	Narsu Bahera

==== Special awards ====
Category	Recipient(s)
Bhojpuri Asamita Sammaan	Ravi Kishan
Lifetime Achievement Bhojpuri	Jayanti Mala Mishra; Hemalata
Sabrang Item Queen	Glory Mohanta
Most Stylist Actor	Nisar Khan
Sabrang Comedy King	Rohit Singh Matru
Best Film Marketing	Vijay Yadav
Purvanchal Gaurav Samman	Pradeep Singh
Best Debut Producer	Neha Shree
Sabrang Best Newspaper	Hamara Mahanagar
Sabrang Bhojpuri Shree	Vikash Sigh Virappan
Sabrang Best Celebrity Manager	Sonu Pandey Manager of Khesari Lal Yadav
Most Popular Celebrity Manager	Bilquis Kapadia Manager of Ravi Kishan
Best New Voice	Gayatri Yadav
Best PRO of The Year	Sanjay Bhushan Patiyala
PRO of The Decade	Uday Bhagat; Ranjan Sinha
Most Beautiful Face	Sapna Gill
Kala Shree Samman	Preeti Shukla
Best Distributor	Nishant Ujjwal
Most Gorgeous Actress	Chandni Singh
Bhojpuri Folk Queen	Devi
Best Rising Singer	Ishika Bakshi
Most Versatile Actress	Ritu Singh
Best Rising Music Company	Twenty Six Bhojpuri
Best Emerging Music Company	DRJ Records
Bhojpuri Ratna	Sanjay Sinha
Most Popular Comedian	Prakash Jais
Most Popular Anchor	Smriti Sinha
Best Movie Channel	Oscar Movies Bhojpuri
Best YouTube CMS Provider	Mars Entertainment

=== Sabrang Film Awards 2018 ===
Sabrang 2018 was held on 22 October 2018 at Atharva College, Malad (Mumbai) and the show was hosted by Awadhesh Mishra and Smiriti Sinha. Many Bollywood and Bhojpuri personalities attended as guests, such as Bappi Lahiri, Brijesh Sandilya, Ravi Kishan, Khesari Lal Yadav, Kajal Raghwani, Sambhavna Seth, and others.

==== Popular awards ====
Category	Recipient(s)
Best Actor (Male)	Khesari Lal Yadav for Mehandi Laga Ke Rakhna
Best Actor (Female)	Kajal Raghwani for Mehandi Laga Ke Rakhna
Best Actor (Critics)	Ravi Kishan
Best Actress (Critics)	Akshara Singh
Best Villain (Critics)	Dev Singh
Best Director	Manjul Thakur for Nirahua Hindustani 2
Best Debutant Director	Rajnish Mishra for Mehandi Laga Ke Rakhna
Best Story	Rajnish Mishra for Mehandi Laga Ke Rakhna
Best Film	Mehandi Laga Ke Rakhna
Best Debutant Actor	Akash Singh Yadav for Tere Jaisa Yaar Kahan
Best Debutant Actress	Sapna Gill for Kashi Amarnath
Best Actor In A Negative Role	Sanjay Pandey for Nirahua Hindustani 2
Best Actor In A Comic Role	Manoj Tiger for Sipahi
Best Actor In A Supporting Role	Awdhesh Mishra for Mehandi Laga Ke Rakhna
Most Popular Film	Nirahua Hindustani 2
Most Popular Actor	Khesari Lal Yadav
Most Popular Actress	Amrapali Dubey
Most Popular Pair	Khesari Lal Yadav & Kajal Raghwani

==== Musical awards ====
Category	Recipient(s)
Best Music Director	Rajnish Mishra for Mehandi Laga Ke Rakhna
Best Lyrics	Pyare Lal Yadav for Mehandi Laga Ke Rakhna
Best Playback Singer (Male)	Pawan Singh for Jigar
Best Playback Singer (Female)	Kalpana Patowary for Nirahua Hindustani 2
Most Popular Singer (Female)	Priyanka Singh for Mehandi Laga Ke Rakhna
Most Popular Lyrics Writer	Pawan Pandey
Best Music Company	Worldwide Records

==== Technical awards ====
Category	Recipient(s)
Best Action	Andlib Pathan for Challenge
Best Choreography	Kanu Mukharji for Nirahua Hindustani 2
Best Cinematography	Devendra Tiwari for Jigar
Best Costume Design	Badshah Khan
Best Dialogue	Santosh Mishra for Kashi Amarnath
Best Editing	Deepak Jaul for Satya
Best Screenplay	Manjul Thakur for Nirahua Hindustani 2
Best Art Director	Vijay Das
Best Still Photographer	Ashok Mehta

==== Special awards ====
Category	Recipient(s)
Lifetime Achievement	Bappi Lahiri; Gopal Rai
Living Legend Personality	Kunal Singh
Evergreen Blockbuster Actress	Pakkhi Hegde
Item Queen	Sambhavna Seth
Kalashri Samman	Aditya Ozha; Manmohan Tiwari; Sanjay Aggarwal; Anita Rawat; Kalyani Kumari; Kajal Yadav; Raghav Nayyar; Poonam Dubey; Anara Gupta; Kanak Pandey; Sunny Singh
Best Action Star	Yash Kumar Mishra
Most Beautiful Actress	Smiriti Sinha
Sabrang Film Samman	Mohini Ghosh
Most Handsome Actor	Nisar Khan
Sahitya Shree Samman	Lata Shree
Sur Shree Samman	Deepak Tripathi
Comedy Star Actor	Bijendra Singh
Best Film Marketing	Vijay Yadav
Purvanchal Gaurav Samman	Akash Deep
Bhojpuri Film Personality	Durga Prasad Majumdar
Dynamic Producer	Pravesh Lal Yadav
Best Newspaper	Hamara Mahanagar
Best Event Management	Vikash Sigh Virappan
Best Celebrity Manager	Sonu Pandey

=== Sabrang Film Awards 2017 ===
Sabrang 2017 was held on 1 November 2017 at Dinanath Mangeshkar Natyagriha Vile Parle, Mumbai. The show was presented by Bhojpuri Panchayat Patrika, sponsored by Good Night Fast Card, and the telecast partners were Bhojpuri Cinema TV and Dangal. The show hosted by Sunil Sawra and Yash Kumar Mishra. Many Bollywood and Bhojpuri personalities come as guests, including Prem Chopra, Brijesh Sandilya, Sunil Paul, Poonam Jhawer, Udit Narayan, Deepa Narayan, Ravi Kishan, Khesari Lal Yadav, Dinesh Lal Yadav, Amrapali Dubey, and Anjana Singh.

Category	Recipient(s)
Best Director	Rajkumar R. Pandey from Dulhan Chahi Pakistan Se
Best Actor (Male)	Dinesh Lal Yadav for Ram Lakhan
Best Actor (Female)	Amrapali Dubey for Ram Lakhan
Best Actor (Critics)	Khesari Lal Yadav
Best Actress (Critics)	Madhu Sharma
Best Film	Ram Lakhan
Best Music Director	Madhukar Anand for Bhojpuriya Raja
Best Playback Singer (Male)	Pawan Singh for Bhojpuriya Raja
Best Playback Singer (Female)	Priyanka Singh for Bhojpuriya Raja
Best Story	Aslam Sheikh for Khiladi
Best Actor In A Negative Role	Ashok Samarth for Beta
Best Actor In A Supporting Role	Pravesh Lal Yadav for Rama Lakhan
Best Actress In A Supporting Role	Anjana Singh for Beta
Best Actor In A Comic Role	Manoj Tiger for Dabang Aashiq
Best Debutant Actor	Udhari Babu for Baliya Ke Dabangai
Best Debutant Actress	Nidhi Jha for Gadar
Best Lyrics	Azad Singh for Bhojpuriya Raja
Best Editing	Preetam Naik for Khiladi
Best Choreography	Kanu Mukharji for Ram Lakhan
Best Cinematography	Vasu for Khiladi
Best Action	Andlib Pathan for Mokama 0 KM
Best Costume Design	Kavita Sunita for Beta
Best Screenplay	Santosh Mishra for Mokama 0 KM
Best Dialogue	Shashi Ranjan Dwivedi for Beta
Best Art	Vijay Das for Khiladi
Best Publicity Design	Narsu Bahera for Khiladi
Most Popular Singer (Male)	Pawan Singh
Most Popular Singer (Female)	Kalpana Patowary
Most Popular Actor	Ravi Kishan
Most Popular Actress	Anjana Singh
Most Popular Film	Dulhan Chahi Pakistan Se
Most Popular Pair	Dinesh Lal Yadav & Amrapali Dubey
Most Popular Music Company	Wave Music
Best Romantic Hero	Pradeep Pandey "Chintu"
Item Queen	Seema Singh
Lifetime Achievement Award	Prem Chopra; Chandrakala Srivastav
Sabrang Kalashri Samman	Anara Gupta; Kajal Yadav; Karan Pandey; Nisar Khan; Shreya Mukharji
Sur Ratna Award	Alok Kumar
Best Standup Comedian	Sunil Pal
Power Award	Abhay Sinha
Best Music Company	Worldwide Records
Sabrang Film Award	Mohini Ghosh
Best Creative Director (Television)	Kumar Dev
Best Film Distributor	Nishant Ujjawal
Most Rising Producer	Vivek Rastogi
Surshri Award	Deepak Tripathi
Bhojpuri Ratna	Sanjay Sinha
Best Celebrity Manager	Sonu Kumar Pandey
Best Debut Music Company	Team Films
Best PRO	Uday Bhagat; Ranjan Sinha
Most Popular Personality	Madhuvendra Rai
Best Character Artist	Surya Dwivedi
Best Movie Channel	Oscar Movies Bhojpuri
Comedy King	Sunil Sawra
Best Newspaper	Hamara Mahanagar

=== Sabrang Film Awards 2016 ===
Sabrang 2016 was held on 3 September 2016 at Naveen Bhai Thakkar Auditorium Vile Parle, Mumbai. The show was presented by Bhojpuri Panchayat Patrika, sponsored by Frontline, Abhiyan, Jivika Film Production, Bihari Connet, Wave Music and Worldwide Records Bhojpuri. Telecast partners were Bhojpuri Cinema TV and Dangal. Sabrang 2016 was hosted by Priyesh Sinha, Ritu Singh and Ajeet Anand.

Category	Recipient(s)
Best Director	Satish Jain from Nirahua Hindustani
Best Actor (Male)	Dinesh Lal Yadav for Nirahua Hindustani
Best Actor (Female)	Madhu Sharma for Ghulami
Best Film	Nirahua Hindustani
Best Music Director	Pankaj Tiwari & Govind Ojha for Ghulami
Best Playback Singer (Male)	Pawan Singh for Hukumat
Best Story	Santosh Mishra for Patna Se Pakistan
Best Actor In A Negative Role	Sanjay Pandey for Raja Babu
Best Actor In A Supporting Role	Kunal Singh for Ghulami
Best Actress In A Supporting Role	Maya Yadav for Hukumat
Best Actor In A Comic Role	Prakash Jais for Raja Babu
Best Debutant Actor	Nisar Khan for Shiv Rakshak
Best Debutant Actress	Ritu Singh for Sapera
Best Lyrics	Pyare Lal Yadav for Ghulami
Best Editing	Preetam Naik for Ghulami
Best Choreography	Kanu Mukharjee for Raja Banu
Best Cinematography	Rafiq Latif Shaikh for Patna Se Pakistan
Best Action	Andalib Pathan for Patna Se Pakistan
Best Costume Design	Kavita Sunita Creation
Best Art	Vijay Das for Ghulami
Best Publicity Design	Narsu Bahera
Best Romantic Actor	Vinay Anand
Item Queen	Seema Singh
Lifetime Achievement Award	Jay Tilak
Sabrang Kalashri Samman	Anara Gupta; Mohini Ghosh; Sagar Solanki; Neetu Kumari
Comedy King	Sunil Pal
Bihar Gaurav Award	Abhay Sinha
Best Music Company	Wave Music
Best Debutant Music Company	Worldwide Records
Sabrang Film Award	Antara Benarjee
Best Creative Director (Television)	Kumar Dev
Surshri Award	Deepak Tripathi; Shyamli Shrivastav
Best Bhojpuri Channel	Bhojpuri Cinema TV
Diamond of Bhojpuri	Ravi Kishan
Hot Cake	Anjana Singh
Nirbhaya Jyoti Samman	Madhu Chopra
Best Devotional Singer	Rajeev Mishra
Most Popular Choreographer	Pappu Khanna
Bhojpuri Rockstar	Mohan Rathore
Best Anchor	Priyesh Singh
Best Entertainer	Sambhavna Seth
