= List of Bhojpuri films of 2023 =

These are the list of Bhojpuri language films that are scheduled to release in 2023.

== January–March ==
Opening		Title	Director	Cast	Production Company	Ref.
J A N U A R Y	14	Sab Ka Baap Angutha Chhap	Parag Patil	Nirahua; Akshara Singh; Shruti Rao	Baba Motions Picture	
J A N U A R Y	26	Raja Doli Leke Aaja	Sujit Kumar Singh	Nirahua; Amrapali Dubey		
F E B R U A R Y	24	Daag - Ego Lalchhan	Premanshu Singh	Ritesh Pandey; Amrapali Dubey	Enterr10 Television Network, Reni Vijay Films	
M A R C H	9	Farishta	Lalbabu Pandit	Khesari Lal Yadav; Meghashree; Pooja Ganguly	Worldwide Records	
M A R C H	24	Naam Badnaam	Vishnu Shankar Velu	Kajal Raghwani; Gaurav Jha; Heera Yadav	UFO	

== April – June ==
Opening		Title	Director	Cast	Production Company	Ref.
A P R I L	21	Ishq		Kajal Raghwani	Baba Motions Picture	
M A Y	12	Namak Haraam	Ashish Tiwari	Trisha Kar Madhu; Tanushree Chatterjee; Basudev Paswan		
M A Y	16	Maai: Pride of Bhojpuri		Nirahua; Amrapali Dubey		
M A Y	24	Bewafa Sanam		Pawan Singh; Smriti Sinha		
M A Y	27	Dadu I Love You		Awdhesh Mishra		
J U N E	4	Khiladi		Shahar Afsha		

== July – September ==
Opening		Title	Director	Cast	Production Company	Ref.
J U L Y	7	Kalakand	Santosh Mishra	Nirahua; Amrapali Dubey; Rachna Yadav	Worldwide Records	
J U L Y	7	Darling		Akshara Singh	Baba Motions Pictures	
J U L Y	14	Papa Main Chhoti Se Badi Ho Gai	Samrat Singh	Vinod Mishra; Samarth Chaturvedi	Om Production House	
J U L Y	15	Tu Tu Main Main	Praveen Kumar	Ritesh Pandey; Yamini Singh		
J U L Y	28	Sanak	Arvind Chaubey	Pawan Singh Smrity Sinha		
S E P T E M B E R	22	Laadla 2	Abhay Sinha	Khesari Lal Yadav	Yashi Films	

== October – December ==
Opening		Title	Director	Cast	Production Company	Ref.
O C T O B E R	14	Sitamgar	Pulin Mitra		Bhumika Films	
O C T O B E R	20	Sangharsh 2	Parag Patil	Khesari Lal Yadav; Meghasri; Kriti Yadav	Worldwide Records	
O C T O B E R	20	Har Har Gange	Chandan Kanhaiya Upadhyay	Pawan Singh; Smrity Sinha		
N O V E M B E R	15	Chhath Ke Baratiya		Smrity Sinha		
N O V E M B E R	20	Vivah 3	Rajnish Mishra	Amrapali Dubey		
D E C E M B E R	15	Aasra	Ananjay Raghuraj	Ritesh Pandey	yashi Films	
