= Manoj Tiger =

Indian actor (born 1976)

- Born: 30 May 1976 (age 50); Azamgarh, Uttar Pradesh, India
- Education: Bachelor of Arts
- Alma mater: University of Allahabad
- Occupation: Actor
- Years active: 2005–present
- Works: The Accidental Prime Minister; Batla House; Border; Patna Se Pakistan

Manoj Singh Tiger (born 30 May 1976), popularly known as Manoj Tiger, is an Indian actor mainly active in Bhojpuri films. He is known for his comedic roles in films and has also worked as in several Bhojpuri films in negative roles. He has also appeared in the Bollywood films The Accidental Prime Minister and Batla House.

== Early life and education ==
He attend University of Allahabad and attained the degree of Bachelor of Arts.

== Career ==
In 2007, he worked in Nirahua Rickshawala with Dinesh Lal Yadav and Pakkhi Hegde. The popularity of this character has been that two films in the name of Batasha Chacha have also been released.

== Filmography ==
Key
†	Denotes films that have not yet been released

Year	Film	Role	Ref.
2006	Chalat Musafir Moh Liyo Re		
2006	Nirahua Rickshawala	Batasha	
2006	Ho Gayil Ba Pyar Odhniya Wali Se		
2007	Shrimaan Driver Babu		
2008	Rangeela Babu		
2008	Khiladi No. 1		
2009	Bah Khiladi Bah		
2009	Bhoomi Putra		
2010	Batasha Chacha		
2010	Aakhri Rasta		
2010	Hamra Mati Me Dam Ba		
2010	Shiva		
2010	Kaalo	Bus Conductor	Hindi film
2011	Piyawa Bada Satawela		
2012	Morcha Bandi		
2012	Bhaiya Hamar Dayavan		
2013	Rakhela Shan Bhojpuria Jawan		
2013	Rani Chali Sasural		
2013	Kajra Mohabbat Wala		
2013	Veer Balwaan		
2013	Tiger		
2013	Mere Sajan Tere Karan		
2013	Sapoot		
2013	Majnu Moterwala		
2013	Panchayat		
2013	Bihari Rikshawala		
2013	Kasam Vardi Ke		
2014	Hunterwali		
2014	Nihattha		
2014	Raja Ji I Love You		
2014	Ghus Ke Marab		
2014	Deewangi Had Se		
2014	Sajna Mangiya Sajai Da Hamar		
2014	Bihari Ban Gayil Hero		
2014	Rowdi Rani		
2014	Jaan Lebu Ka Ho		
2015	Vijay Path Ego Jung		
2015	Nigahen Nagin Ki		
2015	Prashasan		
2015	Nirahua Rikshawala 2		
2015	Patna Se Pakistan	Chintaharan Chaubey	
2015	Leke Aaja Band Baja Ye Pawan Raja		
2015	Dulaara		
2015	Khakhi Vardiwala		
2016	Jai Mehraru Jai Sasurari		
2016	Bahurani		
2016	Nirahua Chalal Sasural 2		
2016	Bam Bam Bol Raha Hai Kashi	Jagan Verma	
2016	Dabang Aashiq		
2016	Ram Lakhan		
2016	Balam Ji Jhuth Na Boli		
2016	Deewane		
2016	Mokama 0 KM		
2016	Hogi Pyar Ki Jeet		
2017	Pahali Nazar Ko Salam		
2017	Aatankwadi		
2017	Allahabad Se Islamabad		
2017	Action Raja		
2017	Tabadala		
2017	Jigar		
2017	Kasam Paida Karne Wale Ki		
2017	Sipahi		
2017	Jila Champaran		
2017	Hum Hai Lootere		
2017	Kashi Amarnath		
2017	Rabba Ishq Na Hove		
2018	Hitler		
2018	Sarkailo Khatiya Jada Lage		
2018	Maai Re Hamra Uhe Ladki Chahi		
2018	Mehandi Laga Ke Rakhna 2		
2018	Halfa Macha Ke Gail		
2018	Dulhan Ganga Paar Ke		
2018	Border	Mithai Lal Yadav	
2018	Maa Tujhe Salaam	Parwana Karimullah	
2018	Balamua Tohre Khatir	Baba Paane	
2018	Sanki Daroga	Sub Inspector Tiwari	
2018	Munna Mawali		
2018	Khuddar		
2018	Yadav Pan Bhandar		
2019	The Accidental Prime Minister	Amar Singh	Hindi film
2019	Lagal Raha Batasha		
2019	Batla House		Hindi film
2019	Nirahua Chalal London	Lakhan	
2021	Litti Chokha	TBA	Post-production
2021	Baap Ji	TBA	
2023	Ahimsa	TBA	Telugu film
2023	Aghori		
2025	Power Star		

== Awards ==
Year	Ceremony	Category	Film	Result	Ref.
2017	Sabrang Film Awards	Best Actor in a Comic Role	Dabang Aashiq	Won	
2018	Sabrang Film Awards	Best Actor in a Comic Role	Sipahi	Won	
2019	Sabrang Film Awards	Best Actor in a Comic Role	Halfa Macha Ke Gail	Won	
