= List of Bhojpuri films of 2018 =

These are the list of Bhojpuri language films that are scheduled to release in 2018.

== January–March ==
Opening	Title	Director	Cast	Source
23 March	Channa Jor Garam		Pramod Premi Yadav, Aditya Ozha, Neha Shree	

== April-June ==
Opening		Title	Director	Cast	Production Company	Ref.
A P R I L	13	Damru	Rajnish Mishra	Khesari Lal Yadav	Baba Motion Pictures Pvt Ltd	
A P R I L	20	Mai Re Mai Hamka Uhe Laiki Chahi		Pradeep Pandey "Chintu", Priti Dhyani		
A P R I L	27	Mehandi Laga Ke Rakhna 2	Manjul Thakur	Pradeep Pandey "Chintu", Yash Kumar, Richa Dixit		
A P R I L	27	Karam Yug		Ritesh Pandey, Priyanka Pandit		
M A Y	11	Wanted		Pawan Singh, Akshara Singh		
M A Y	25	Awara Balam		Arvind Akela "Kallu", Priyanka Pandit		
M A Y	25	Dulhan Ganga Paar Ke		Khesari Lal Yadav, Kajal Raghwani		
J U N E	15	Border	Santosh Mishra	Dinesh Lal Yadav, Amrapali Dubey, Shubhi Sharma		

=== July-September ===
Opening	Title	Director	Cast	Source
13 July	Bairi Kangana 2		Ravi Kishan, Kajal Raghwani, Shubhi Sharma	
13 July	Raja Jani		Khesari Lal Yadav	
20 July	Goonghat Me Ghotala		Pravesh Lal Yadav, Mani Bhattacharya, Richa Dixit	
3 August	Nagraj		Yash Kumar, Anjana Singh	
3 August	Gangster Dulhaniya		Gaurav Jha, Nidhi Jha	
10 August	Maa Tujhe Salaam		Pawan Singh, Madhu Sharma, Akshara Singh	
24 August	Sangharsh		Khesari Lal Yadav, Kajal Raghwani	
7 September	Sanki Daroga	Saif Kidwai	Ravi Kishan, Anjana Singh	
7 September	Munna Mawali		Pramod Premi Yadav, Poonam Dubey	
21 September	Loha Pahalwan	Iqbal Baksh	Pawan Singh	

=== October-December ===
Opening	Title	Director	Cast	Production company	Source
5 October	Indian Viraz		Prince Singh Rajput		
16 October	Dulhan Chahi Pakistan Se 2		Pradeep Pandey ("Chintu"), Rahul Dev	Sai Deep Films	
18 October	Balam Ji Love You		Khesari Lal Yadav, Kajal Raghwani	Shree Raama Production House	
16 November	Nagdev		Khesari Lal Yadav, Kajal Raghwani		
30 November	Dabang Sarkar		Khesari Lal Yadav, Kajal Raghwani	Sea View Films Presents, Creator’s Lab Pvt. Ltd	
