= Khiladi (2016 film) =

Bhojpuri film

- Directed by: Aslam Sheikh
- Screenplay by: Aslam Sheikh; Ishtiyak Sheikh "Bunty"
- Story by: Aslam Sheikh
- Produced by: Abhay Sinha; Manish Singhal; Sameer Aftab
- Starring: Khesari Lal Yadav; Madhu Sharma; Anjana Singh; Mahesh Acharya
- Cinematography: Vasu
- Edited by: Preetam Naik
- Music by: Harsh Sharma
- Production companies: Yashi Films; Madz Movies
- Release dates: 6 May 2016 (Bihar); 15 July 2016 (Mumbai)
- Country: India
- Language: Bhojpuri

Khiladi is a 2016 Indian Bhojpuri-language action romance comedy drama film directed by Aslam Sheikh and produced by Abhay Sinha, Sameer Aftab and Manish Singhal. The film was co-produced by Madz Movies. The film was starred by Khesari Lal Yadav and Madhu Sharma in lead roles, while Anjana Singh, Shivika Diwan, Payasi Pandit, J Neelam, Prakash Jais, Surya Dwivedi, Mahesh Acharya, Sudesh Kaul and Manoj Tiger portrayed pivotal roles.

== Plot ==
The story begins from Danapur where the two thieves Khesari and Murari lead a life doing small thefting. One day a person named Durjan Singh gives them the task of stealing the statue of the Lord from the temple of Shivgarh. Both of them steal the statue of God from the temple at night, but the villagers chase them while running and they both hide in an orphanage and hide the statue in a room there. But in the morning the room remains locked, due to which he is unable to take the statue, and he stays there for a few days. At the same time, the men of Thakur Virendra Singh come to the orphanage and threaten to vacate the orphanage, Khesari asks the aunty about this. Then aunt tells that some time ago she went to visit Nepal Pashupatinath temple with her husband Shivdayal Singh. In the meantime there was an earthquake due to which many people were killed and many children were orphaned, then we both decided that we will take these children to our home and take care of them there. But due to the small house, there was a problem in living, so Shivdayal gave the contract to build the house to Thakur Virendra Singh and he fraudulently got him signed on the property paper. And he took the property in his name, which Shivdayal could not tolerate and he died of a heart attack.

Hearing this Khesari and Murari go to meet Thakur Virendra Singh and urge him to leave the orphanage but Thakur Virendra Singh does not agree. At the same time, Thakur's daughter Kajal comes there and Khesari falls in love with him. At the behest of Thakur Virendra Singh, the shopkeeper refuses to give ration to the aunt, due to which all the children remain hungry for two days. Khesari is unable to see the hunger of the children for whom he steals in a jewellery, Kajal sees her doing stealing and complains at the police station and the police arrest Khesari. Then Kajal goes to the orphanage, whereupon he know that Khesari did not steal for himself, he steal to satisfy the hunger of these children. Kajal then brings food for all the children but he refuses to take her and says that, they want her Khesari uncle. Then Kajal gets Khesari released on bail and seeing Khesari's goodness, Kajal also falls in love with Khesari. When Virender Singh know this he becomes angry. Meanwhile, Sarpanch elections are held, in which Thakur Virender Singh was winning unopposed for the last several years but this time Khesari also stood in the election against Thakur and Khesari won the election.

Then Thakur's brother-in-law suggested to Thakur that the post of Sarpanch should go away, but that his daughter Kajal should not get out of hand. That is why Thakur calls Laxmikant aka Lucky from America to get Kajal married with him but at the airport, Murari fraudulently takes Lucky. Whom Khesari takes in his words and goes to Thakur's house by making himself the form of Lucky. But when Lucky learns that Khesari and Kajal really love each other, he tells Thakur all the truth. Thakur's men attack Khesari and pick up Kajal and go home. Khesari falls unconscious due to an injury to his head and is admitted to the hospital. Meanwhile, Thakur's men vacate the orphanage and throw out all the things, when Khesari learns that he comes immediately from the hospital. Virendra Singh then makes a deal with Khesari that if he leaves Kajal's life, he too should give it to the orphanage. To save the orphanage, Khesari agrees to sacrifice his love. Khesari pretends to be greedy in front of Kajal, which enrages Kajal and he slaps Khesari and she saying that she is not marry with such a this type greedy man. Virendra Singh decides to marry Kajal with Pawan. But when Kajal learns about the truth in the middle of marriage, she refuses to marry Pawan. She goes to meet Khesari and expresses her love to him. Thakur also comes with his goons but Kajal locks herself and Khesari in a room. And assuming a fire witness there, they marry with seven rounds. In the end, Thakur accepts his defeat, he accepts Khesari and Kajal's marriage.

== Cast ==
- Khesari Lal Yadav as Khesari
- Madhu Sharma as Kajal
- Sudesh Kaul as Thakur Virendra Singh (Kajal's father)
- Mahesh Acharya as Murari (Khesari's friend)
- Payasi Pandit as Rajiya (A Orphan)
- J Neelam as Kajal's mother
- Anoop Arora as Shivdayal Singh
- Bandini Mishra as Shivdayal's wife (Khesari's aunty)
- Prakash Jais as Kajal's maternal uncle
- Surya Dwivedi as Laxmikant urf Lucky
- Shivika Diwan as A Orphan, who lived with Khesari
- Manoj Tiger as Train passenger
- Brijesh Tripathi as Inspector Pyarelal
- Anjana Singh as Guest appearance

== Production ==
Filming of Khiladi was done in Mumbai, it is also shot at some beautiful locations in Silvassa and Manali. The makers have revealed that Khesari Lal Yadav will be seen enacting some exciting stunts in the film.

The script of Khiladi was written by Aslam Sheikh while background music scored by Harsh Sharma. Costume designed by "Madhur Designz" and "Kavita & Sunita Creation". Art direction done by Vijay Das. The cinematography is by Vasu and Preetam Naik is the editor. Dileep Yadav has directed the action and stunts in the film. Pappu Khanna have choreographed the dance numbers. Editing done in "Yashi Films Pvt Ltd (Juhu)". Sound and mixing done by "Audio Lab Studio" while VFX done by "EFX Studio".

== Release ==
The film theatrically released on 6 May 2016 across 67 theatres of Bihar and Jharkhand and received big opening, film enter in second weak with 58 screens. In an interview, producer of this film Abhay Sinha says "Khiladi is first superhit of 2016". Film enter in fourth weak in some theatres of Bihar and Jharkhand.

Film also released at Mumbai and Gujarat theatres on 15 July 2016.

== Soundtrack ==
Khiladi

Soundtrack album by Avinash Jha (Ghungharoo)
- Released: 2016
- Venue: Mumbai
- Studio: Sada Pancham Studio
- Genre: Feature film soundtrack
- Length: 38:08
- Language: Bhojpuri
- Label: Wave Music
- Producer: Abhay Sinha

The soundtrack for Khiladi was composed by Avinash Jha "Ghunghroo Ji" with lyrics written by Pyare Lal Yadav, Pawan Pandey and Azad Singh. It was produced under the "Wave Music" label, who also bought his satellite rights.

Its song "Lahe Lahe Mala Ae Raja" was released on 16 July 2016 at YouTube, which viewed by 26 million people.

Track listing
No.	Title	Lyrics	Singer(s)	Length
1.	"Aego Chumma De Da"	Azad Singh	Khesari Lal Yadav	3:29
2.	"Bhale Angutha Chhap Haee"	Azad Singh	Khesari Lal Yadav, Mohan Rathore	3:57
3.	"Dil Ke Khilauna"	Pyare Lal Yadav	Raja Hasan	3:00
4.	"Chala Khela Shuru Kail Jai"	Azad Singh	Khesari Lal Yadav, Indu Sonali	3:53
5.	"Jawani Complain Karata"	Pyare Lal Yadav	Khesari Lal Yadav, Kalpana Patowary	3:31
6.	"Lahe Lahe Mala Ae Raja"	Azad Singh	Khesari Lal Yadav, Indu Sonali	4:37
7.	"Jab Dil ke Dhadkan Me"	Pawan Pandey	Khesari Lal Yadav, Khushboo Jain	3:53
8.	"Pyar Mange Lungi Bichake"	Pawan Pandey	Indu Sonali, Sardohi	3:56
9.	"Samay Ke Fera Sab Ke Sang"	Pyare Lal Yadav	Udit Narayan, Khushboo Jain	7:52
Total length:				38:08

== Marketing ==
First-look poster of this film was released on 14 March 2016 and second on 13 April 2016.

Trailer of Khiladi was released on 29 April 2016 at official YouTube channel of "Wave Music".

The film also streamed at YouTube on 10 October 2016 at same handle of trailer unveiled. As of May 2020, he received more than 15 million views on YouTube.

== Award and nominations ==
Ceremony	Venue	Category	Recipient(s) and nominee(s)	Result	Ref.
Sabrang Film Awards 2017	Mumbai	Best Story	Aslam Sheikh	Won	
Sabrang Film Awards 2017	Mumbai	Best Editing	Preetam Naik	Won	
Sabrang Film Awards 2017	Mumbai	Best Cinematography	Vasu	Won	
Sabrang Film Awards 2017	Mumbai	Best Art	Vijay Das	Won	
Sabrang Film Awards 2017	Mumbai	Best Publicity Designer	Narsu Bahera	Won	
