= Khiladi =

Khiladi (transl. Player) may refer to:

- Khiladi (franchise), an Indian action film franchise starring Akshay Kumar:
  - Khiladi (1992 film), the first film in the series
  - Akshay Kumar (born 1967), Indian actor, nicknamed "Khiladi Kumar" after the franchise
- Khiladi (1950 film), an Indian Hindi-language film
- Khiladi (1968 film), an Indian action film
- Kiladi, a 2000 Indian Kannada-language film
- Khiladi (2013 film), an Indian Bengali-language slapstick comedy film
- Khiladi (2016 film), an Indian Bhojpuri-language film
- Khiladi (2022 film), an Indian Telugu-language action film starring Ravi Teja
