= Awdhesh Mishra =

Indian actor

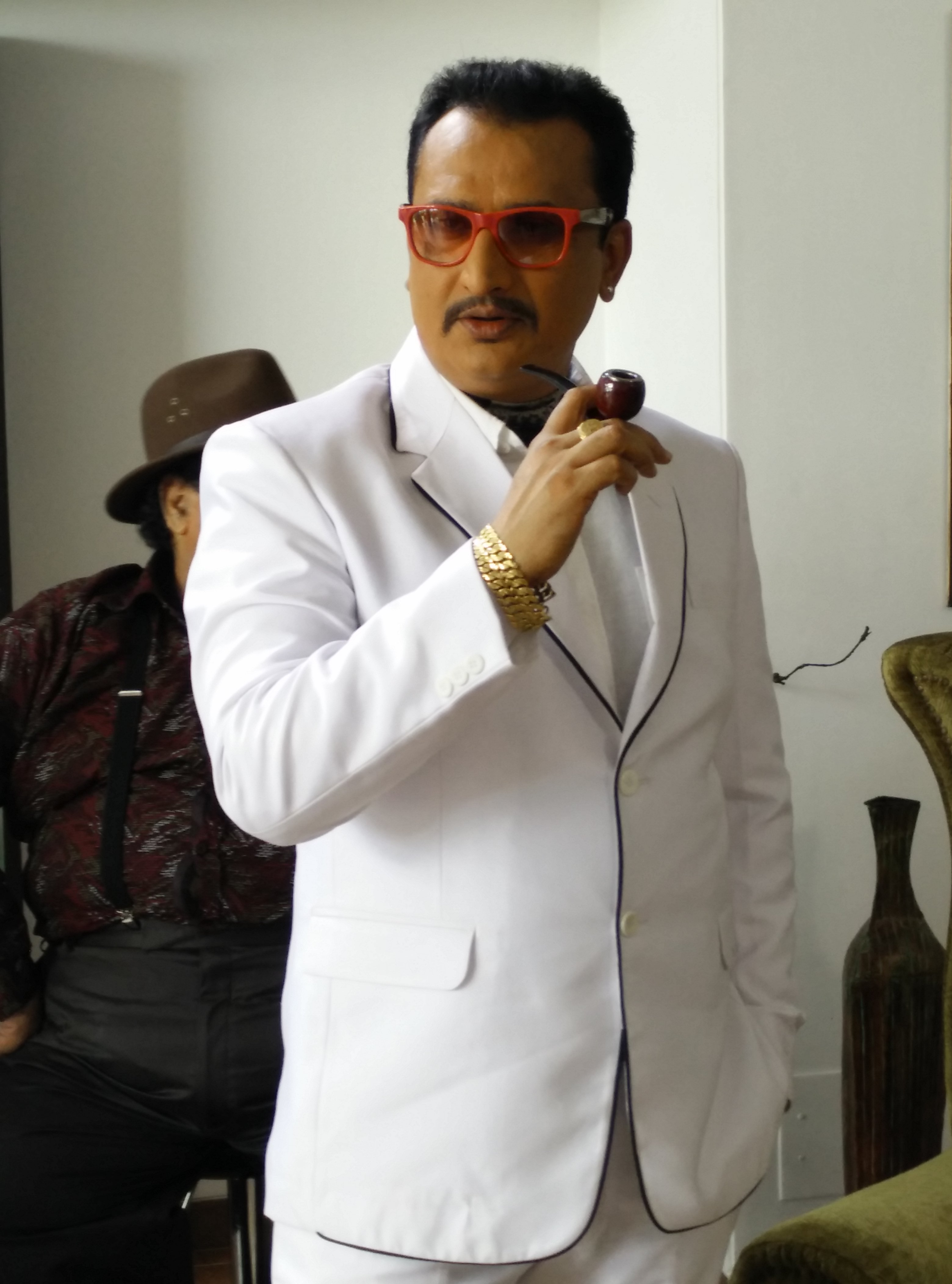
- Born: 5 August 1969 (age 57)
- Occupations: Actor, Director, Writer, Poet
- Years active: 2005 – present
- Spouse: Ragini Mishra
- Children: 2
- Website: awdheshmishra.in

Awdhesh Mishra (born 5 August 1969) is an Indian actor who primarily works in Bhojpuri-language films, mainly in negative roles. He has worked as main villain in several Bhojpuri films, few Tamil and Bollywood as well.

== Career ==
Awdhesh Mishra started his career as a theatre artist from Patna theatre.

In 2005 he made his in film acting debut as a villain in the Bhojpuri movie Dulha Aisan Chahi directed by sunil sinha and his performance was praised by critics.

He did the film Ganga Devi in (2012).

Tamil debut film is Poojai in 2014 Tamil-language action masala film written and directed by Hari and produced by Vishal.

His Hindi debut film was Dirty Politics in 2015 Hindi-language Indian political thriller film written and directed by K. C. Bokadia.

== Filmography ==
Key
†	Denotes films that have not yet been released

Year	Title	Role	Language
2005	Dulha Aisan Chahi		Bhojpuri Debut
2005	Kakhan Harab Dukh Mor	Bhagwan Mahadev (Lord Mahadev)	Maithili
2009	Saat Saheliyan		Bhojpuri
2010	Devra Bada Satawela		Bhojpuri
2010	Bhojpuriya Don		Bhojpuri
2011	Nirahua Mail		Bhojpuri
2012	Saugandh Ganga Maiya Ke		Bhojpuri
2012	Ganga Devi		Bhojpuri
2013	Jeena Teri Gali Mein		Bhojpuri
2014	Poojai	Rai Bahadur	Tamil debut
2014	Devra Bhail Deewana		Bhojpuri
2014	Aurat Khilauna Nahi		Bhojpuri
2015	Dirty Politics	Jabbar Singh	Hindi Debut
2015	Chhora Ganga Kinare Wala		Bhojpuri
2015	Dulaara		Bhojpuri
2015	Nahle pe Dahla		Bhojpuri
2015	Prashasan		Bhojpuri
2015	Muqabala		Bhojpuri
2015	Adalat		Bhojpuri
2016	Mehandi Laga Ke Rakhna	Narayan	Bhojpuri
2016	Sangram		Bhojpuri
2016	Nirahua Chalal Sasural 2		Bhojpuri
2016	Jwala		Bhojpuri
2016	Maine Dil Tujhko Diya		Bhojpuri
2016	Sasural		Bhojpuri
2017	Mai Sehra Bandh Ke Aaunga	Devanand	Bhojpuri
2017	Rudra		Bhojpuri
2017	Rangeela		Bhojpuri
2017	Mohabbat		Bhojpuri
2017	Mukaddar		Bhojpuri
2017	Allahabad se Ishlamabad		Bhojpuri
2017	Sarkar Raj		Bhojpuri
2017	Bagi Ishq		Bhojpuri
2018	Suno Sasurji		Bhojpuri
2018	Nathuniya Pe Goli Maare 2		Bhojpuri
2018	Aawara Balam		Bhojpuri
2018	Damru	Lord Shiv	Bhojpuri
2018	Sarkai Lo Khatiya Jada Lage		Bhojpuri
2018	Mokama 0 KM		Bhojpuri
2018	Halfa Macha ke Gail		Bhojpuri
2018	Dulhan Ganga Paar Ke		Bhojpuri
2018	Border	Home Minister	Bhojpuri
2018	Bairi Kangana 2	Gangu	Bhojpuri
2018	Saamy 2	New Delhi goon	Tamil
2018	Sangharsh	Loha Yadav	Bhojpuri
2018	Naagdev	Trikal	Bhojpuri
2019	Raajtilak		Bhojpuri
2019	Vivah (2019 film)	Manohar Babu	Bhojpuri
2019	Patthar Ke Sanam	Kashinath Singh	Bhojpuri
2019	Saiya Hamar Kalakar Baa	Kashinath Singh	Bhojpuri
2019	Meri Jung Mera Faisla	Govind	Bhojpuri
2020	Shahansha		Bhojpuri
2020	Love Marriage		Bhojpuri
2020	Aatankvadi		Bhojpuri
2020	Dushman Sarhad Par ke		Bhojpuri
2020	Vansh		Bhojpuri
2021	Jugnu	Narayan	Bhojpuri
2021	Babul		Bhojpuri
2021	Maai Babu Ji ke Ashirwad		Bhojpuri
2021	Dostana		Bhojpuri
2021	Aaye ham barati barat leke		Bhojpuri
2021	Nakali Nawab	Jeen	Bhojpuri
2021	Prem Geet		Bhojpuri
2021	Kasam Paida Karne Wale Ki		Bhojpuri
2021	Aan Baan Shaan		Bhojpuri
2021	Naseehat		Bhojpuri
2021	Hunter Wali		Bhojpuri
2021	Romeo Raja		Bhojpuri
2023	Aghori		Bhojpuri
2023	Maai: Pride of Bhojpuri		Bhojpuri
2023	Dadu I Love You		Bhojpuri
2022	Aaghat †	TBA	Hindi
2022	Vijeta		Bhojpuri
2022	Dil Mil Gaye †	TBA	Bhojpuri
2022	Ardhnaari †	TBA	Bhojpuri
2022	Love Express †	TBA	Bhojpuri
2022	Dangerous Ishq †	TBA	Bhojpuri
2022	Babul ki galiya †	TBA	Bhojpuri
2022	Nasheehat †	TBA	Bhojpuri
2022	Itti si Khushi †	TBA	Bhojpuri
2022	Janta Ki Adalat †	TBA	Bhojpuri
2022	Dil lagal dupatta walise 2 †	TBA	Bhojpuri
2022	Mere Papa †	TBA	Bhojpuri
2022	Wajood †	TBA	Bhojpuri
2022	King †	TBA	Bhojpuri
2022	Parshuram †	TBA	Bhojpuri
2022	Purdmashi †	TBA	Bhojpuri
2022	Dadu I Love You †	TBA	Bhojpuri

== Direction ==
Key
†	Denotes films that have not yet been released

Year	Title	Role	Language
2021	Babul		Bhojpuri
2021	Jugnu		Bhojpuri

== Web series ==
Key
†	Denotes films that have not yet been released

Year	Title	Role	Language
2022	Inspector Avinash †	TBA	Hindi
