= Baap Ji =

2021 Indian Bhojpuri film

- Official Poster
- Directed by: Dev Pandey
- Written by: Arbind Tiwari
- Produced by: Ramjit Jaiswal
- Starring: Khesari Lal Yadav; Ritu Singh; Manoj Tiger; Kajal Raghwani
- Cinematography: R R Prince
- Music by: Om Jha
- Production companies: Govinda & Sagar Films Entertainment
- Distributed by: Worldwide Records Bhojpuri
- Release date: 24 September 2021
- Country: India
- Language: Bhojpuri

Baap Ji is a 2021 Indian Bhojpuri-language action comedy drama film directed by Dev Pandey and produced by Ramjit Jaiswal under his production house "Govinda & Sagar Films Entertainment". The stars Khesari Lal Yadav in the lead role and Ritu Singh in the opposite role. While Manoj Singh Tiger, C P Bhatt, Brijesh Tripathi, Saheb Lal Dhari, Abhay Rai, Prakash Jais, Sanjay Verma, Ritu Pandey and others in supporting roles. Kajal Raghwani make a special appearance in a song.

== Cast ==
- Khesari Lal Yadav
- Ritu Singh
- Manoj Tiger
- Kajal Raghwani
- CP Bhatt
- Brijesh Tripathi
- Prakash Jais
- Sanjay Verma
- Ritu Pandey
- Saheb Lal Dhari
- Abhay Rai

== Production ==
Filming started on 11 December 2019 in Lucknow, with mostly scenes shot at Bajardeeh village and Kaji Rudhauli village in Bansi tehsil, Shanteshwar Nath Tripathi's Haveli in Chetia State, Shri Ram Bilas Institute and Medical Sciences at Sonkhar in Naugarh tehsil in the Siddharthnagar district of Uttar Pradesh.

== Music ==
Baap Ji

Soundtrack album by Om Jha
- Released: 2021
- Studio: Worldwide Records
- Genre: Feature film soundtrack
- Language: Bhojpuri
- Label: Worldwide Records Bhojpuri
- Producer: Ramjit Jaiswal

The music of "Baap Ji" is given by Om Jha with lyrics penned by Pyare Lal Yadav, Kundan Preet, Arun Bihari and Yadav Raj. It is produced under the "Worldwide Records Bhojpuri" Music company, who also bought his satellite rights.

His first song "Machhriya" was released on 29 January 2021 on the official YouTube channel of "Worldwide Records Bhojpuri" and crossed over 4.5 million views.

=== Track list ===
No.	Title	Lyrics	Singer(s)	Length
1.	"Machhriya"	Pyare Lal Yadav, Anish Aajam Khan	Khesari Lal Yadav, Khushbu Tiwari KT	4:14
