= Damodar Raao =

Indian singer, composer and songwriter

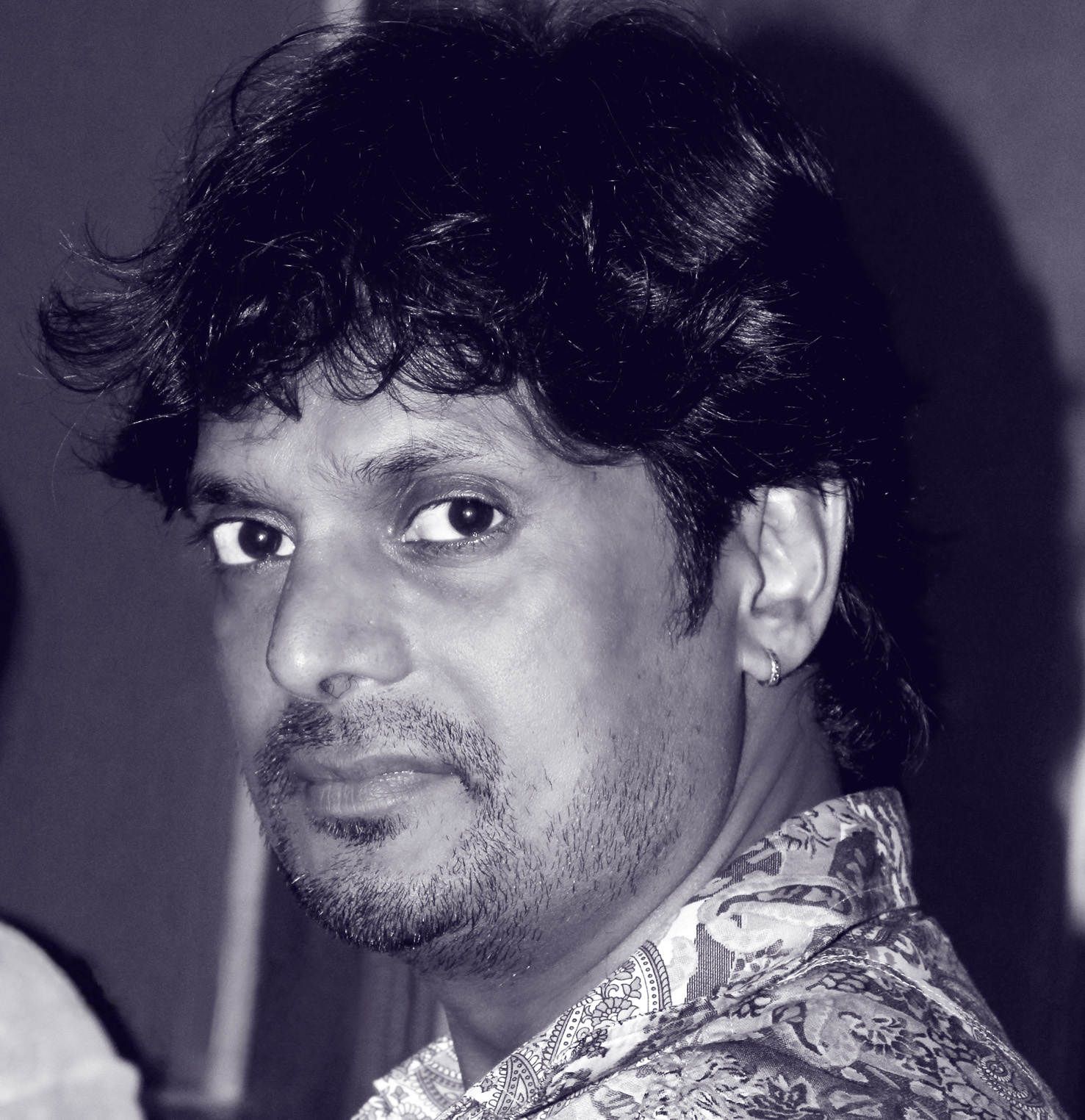
- Damodar Raao

Background information
- Born: 21 August 1977 (age 48); Narkatiaganj West Champaran Bihar.
- Genres: Filmi, folk
- Occupations: composer, singer, actor, performer, record producer
- Instruments: Vocals, harmonium, keyboard, voice over
- Years active: 2007–present
- Labels: Venus, Times Music, Sony Music Entertainment, T-Series, Zee Music Company, Indya Records, Moser Baer, Wave Music, SRK Music, TF Company, Worldwide Music, Sai Records
- Website: www.damodarraao.com

Damodar Raao (born 21 August 1977) is an Indian composer, singer, record producer, and live performer. His music genre is about acoustic folk with some traces of Indian classical music.

== Career ==
In 2000, Raao got his first break as a singer in the Hindi film Shaitan Tantrik, which was composed by Nikhil Vinay with lyrics by Vinay Bihari.

In 2007 Raao moved with his family to Mumbai.

In 2008, he composed the music for the low-budget Hindi film Once More, aka Gorakh Dhandha.

Raao has composed more than 75 films in Bhojpuri language, including Dil Ho Gail Qurban, Teri Meri Ashiqui, Sargana Kushi Nagar Rangdari Tax, Gunday (Bhojpuri), Bagi Ishq, Inspector Chandani, Jungal Raj, Dil Aur Deewar, The Power of Dahshat, Sajan Ki Bahon Me (Bhojpuri), Majnu Motorwala, and Baap Re Baap.

The musical film Teri Meri Ashqui was praised by critics.

== Awards and honors ==
In 2014 Raao received the award for Best Music Director of the Year 2012 by Darshnik Mumbai Press Media Award. He was also honoured by the Aapki Awaz Foundation for Best Music Director & Mumbai Gaurav Award of the year 2014 for the Bhojpuri film Majnu Motorwala. Raao was given the Chhatrapati Shivaji Gaurav Award in 2016 by Darshnik newspaper and Evershine Mitramandal in Mumbai.

In October 2016, Raao reached a record of making 50 filmy albums and devotional albums of various singers.

== Discography ==
=== Films ===
Year	Film	Language	Singer	Actor	Notes
2012	Majnu Motorwala	Bhojpuri	Vinod Rathod, Roop Kumar Rathod, Indu Sonali, Mohan Rathore, Alok Kumar, Khushboo Jain, Kalpana Patowary, Damodar Raao	Kunal Tiwari, Kajal Raghwani, Aaditya Ojha, Rajat Mani, Seema Singh, Ajay Suryavanshi, Ranjan Kumar, Sanjay Pandey, Manoj Tiger, Ratnesh Barnwal	Winner, Darshnik Mumbai Press Media Award for Best Music Director
2013	Dhundh Lenge Manjil Hum	Hindi	Shahid Mallya, Sanchiti Sakat, etc.	Kalyanji Jana, Dharmendra Singh	Released in 2013 in some theatres.
2014	Dream City Mumbai	Hindi	Udit Narayan, Shahid Mallya, Alok Kumar, Shabab Sabri, Manoj Mishra, Bhavesh Bhanushali, Sanchiti Sakat, Khushboo Jain, Pamela Jain, Kalyanji Jana, Sonu Rao, Damodar Raao	Kalyanji Jana, Rashika Sinha, Ramesh Goyal, Akhil Nayak, Dharmendra Singh, Sapna Khatik, Damodar Raao	
2014	Sajan Ki Bahon Mein	Bhojpuri	Indu Sonali, Mohan Rathore, Damodar Raao, Rupesh Mishra, Khushboo Jain, Lali Mishra, Manoj Mishra	Rs Tiwari, Renuja Singh, Rita Ray, Chandan Rajput, Riya Rastogi, Brijesh Tripathi, Vishnushankar Belu, Damodar Raao, Anoop Arora, Ritu Pandey, Pappu Tiwari	Also actor
2014	Teri Meri Ashiqui	Bhojpuri	Alok Kumar, Indu Sonali, Mamta Raut, Khushboo Jain, Kumar Alam, Khushbu Uttam, Manohar Singh, Santosh Puri, Sajan Dubey, Khushboo Uttam	Sujeet Puri, Tanushree, Abhishek Giri, Rajkapoor Shahi	Co-composer: Sujeet Puri
2015	Maai Ke Karz	Bhojpuri	Udit Narayan, Alka Yagnik, Sadhna Sargam, Khushboo Jain, Manoj Mishra, Indu Sonali, Damodar Raao, Alok Kumar, Sumeet Baba, Priyanka Singh, Pamela Jain, Jaydev	Rani Chatterjee, Vinay Anand, Roshan Kumar, Akshara Singh, Bipin Singh, Sanjay Pandey, Partibha Pandey, Seema Singh, Maya Yadav, Prakash Jais, Rukhsar, Damodar Raao, Ratnesh Barnwal, Jai Prakas Singh	Co-composers: Rajesh Mishra, Amresh Shahabadi
2015	Ye Hai Yuva Aandolan	Hindi	Udit Narayan, Shahid Mallya, Alok Kumar, Vinod Rathod, Manoj Mishra, Bhavesh Bhanushali, Sanchiti Sakat, Khushboo Jain, Pamela Jain, Sonu Rao, Damodar Raao	Kalyanji Jana, Rashika Sinha, Ramesh Goyal, Akhil Nayak, Dharmendra Singh, Sapna Khatik, Damodar Raao	
2016	Baap Re Baap	Bhojpuri	Alok Kumar, Mohan Rathore, Mamta Raut, Indu Sonali, Gaurav Jha, Poonam Pandey, Alka Jha	Gaurav Jha, Aanchal Soni, Cp Bhatt, Ritu Pandey, Glori Mahanta, Umesh Singh, Sonu Jha	Director: G J Rock
2016	Bagi Ishq				
2016	Gunday				
2016	The Power of Dahshat	Bhojpuri	Udit Narayan, Alok Kumar, Mamta Raut, Madan Ray, Vicky Babua, Damodar Raao, Manoj Mishra, Indu Sonali, Mohan Rathore, Pamela Jain, Khushboo Jain	Viraj Bhatt, Baleshwar Singh, Monalisa Satyendra Singh, Priyanka Pandit	
2017	Parivar Ke Babu	Bhojpuri	Kalpana Patowary, Indu Sonali, Alok Kumar, Khushboo Jain, Pamela Jain	Aditya Mohan, Seema Singh	Director: Dhananjay Pratap Singh
2017	The Power of Dahashat	Bhojpuri	Udit Narayan, Pamela Jain Manoj Mishra, Rupesh Mishra, Mamta Raut	Satendra Singh, Priyanka Pandit	Director: Sanjay Srivastava
2017	Shaheed E Azam - Ek Ankahi Kahani	Hindi	Yash Wadali, Vinod Rathod, Manoj Mishra, Rupesh Mishra, Mamta Raut	Nikhil Singh, Rahul, Sibu Giri	Director: Arun Kumar Pathak
2019	Keep Safe Distance				Unreleased

=== Music albums ===
Year	Non-filmy albums	Language	Singer	Notes
2016	Sabse Badhiya Aapan Bihar	Hindi/Bhojpuri	Udit Narayan, Pamela Jain, Khushboo Jain, Amod Kumar	Telefilm
2016	Hasratein	Hindi	Sanchiti Sakat, Sonu Rao	Unreleased

== See also ==
- Bhojpuri cinema
