= Mehandi Laga Ke Rakhna =

Bhojpuri Film

- Theatrical Release Poster
- Directed by: Rajnish Mishra
- Screenplay by: Rajnish Mishra; Ananjay Raghuraj; Lalji Yadav
- Story by: Rajnish Mishra
- Produced by: Ananjay Raghuraj
- Starring: Khesari Lal Yadav; Kajal Raghwani; Ritu Singh; Awdhesh Mishra; Sanjay Mahanand; Sanjay Pandey; Karan Pandey
- Edited by: Jeetendra Singh (Jitu)
- Production companies: Ananjay Craft & Visions; Trimurti Entertainment Media Presents
- Release date: 2 February 2017
- Running time: 160 minutes
- Country: India
- Language: Bhojpuri

Mehandi Laga Ke Rakhna is a 2017 Indian Bhojpuri-language film written and directed by Rajnish Mishra and produced by Ananjay Raghuraj under the banner of "Ananya Craft And Visions" and presented by "Om Sai Ram Entertainment" with the association of "Trimurti Entertainment Media". It is a remake of the 2007 Telugu film Aadavari Matalaku Arthale Verule. The stars are Khesari Lal Yadav and Kajal Raghwani with Ritu Singh, Awdhesh Mishra, Sanjay Pandey, Sanjay Mahanand, Karan Pandey, Deepak Sinha, Anand Mohan and others in supporting roles. Choreographers from the Bhojpuri Cinema industry Kanu Mukharjee and Glori Mohanta make a special appearance in the song "Sakhi Re Var Pa Gaini".

The film spawned two sequels, Mehandi Laga Ke Rakhna 2 released in 2018 and Mehandi Laga Ke Rakhna 3 release in 2020.

== Plot ==
The film begins with the venture of Raja, who is unemployed. But like every father, Raja's father, Narayan, wants Raja to do some work, but the Raja messes up all the work with his wrong activities, all of which expel him from his job and Narayan is very upset with these activities.

One day Raja finds a beautiful girl named Kajal and learns that she is a music teacher at school. Raja starts working with Kajal in school as a peon, and Narayan is pleased with Raja's improvement and job. After a few days, the entire school goes to the "Swachhata Abhiyan" where Raja expresses his love to Kajal, who feels bad and slaps Raja.

Narayan gets to know the whole thing and takes Raja to a friend's house for entertainment. At the friend's (Mahendra Babu) daughter's marriage, Raja meets all the family members of Mahendra Babu. But to his surprise, he sees that the girl who has come to the wedding is Kajal, whom he loves.

After that, Raja stops at Kajal's home, and helps in the preparation of her wedding. Then slowly, Kajal gets so impressed by the goodness of Raja that she starts loving him. The day after Kajal expresses her love to Raja, her wedding procession comes only two days later. This is the story of how the Raja and Kajal decide between love and rituals.

== Cast ==
- Khesari Lal Yadav as Raja
- Kajal Raghwani, as Kajal
- Ritu Singh as Babli
- Awdhesh Mishra, as Narayan (Raja's Father)
- Sanjay Mahanand as Raja's Friend
- Sanjay Pandey as Main Villain
- Karan Pandey as Sanaku
- Param Hans Singh as Mahendra Babu (Kajal's Father)
- Anand Mohan as Fufaji (Babli's Father)
- Deepak Sinha
- Dhama Verma
- Sweaty Singh
- Dhiraj Singh
- Gopal Rai
- Glory Mohanta as Special Appearance in song "Sakhi Re Var Pa Gaini"
- Kanu Mukharjee as Special Appearance in song "Sakhi Re Var Pa Gaini"

== Production ==
Filming for this film was done in Lucky Studio, Halol, Gujarat with some scenes shot in Nandan Van, Mumbai.

The cinematography has been done by Rafiq Latif Shaikh while choreography is by Kanu Mukharjee and Ricky Gupta. it was edited by Jeetendra Singh (Jitu) and its action director is Bajirao. Dress designed by Badshah Khan. Background music scored by Aslam Surty while sound designed by Satish Poojary (Audio Lab) . Post-production done by Audio Lab Studio.

== Release ==
The film was theatrically released on 2 February 2017 in All over India with positive public reviews. It has broken all records on box office and it is all time blockbuster of Bhojpuri cinema.

== Soundtrack ==
Mehandi Laga Ke Rakhna

Soundtrack album by Rajnish Mishra
- Released: 2017
- Venue: Mumbai
- Studio: Worldwide Records Bhojpuri
- Genre: Feature film soundtrack
- Length: 41:16
- Language: Bhojpuri
- Label: Worldwide Records Bhojpuri

The music for "Mehandi Laga Ke Rakhna" was composed by Rajnish Mishra with lyrics penned by Pyare Lal Yadav, Rajnish Mishra and Shyam Dehati. Background music scored by Aslam Surty. The soundtrack included an unusually large number of songs at 10. It was produced under the "Worldwide Records Bhojpuri" label, who also bought his satellite rights.

His first song "Kawna Devta Ke Garhal Sawarl" released on 27 May 2017 and crossed over 99 million views on YouTube and second song "Laga Ke Fair Lovely" released on 4 June 2017 and crossed over 65 million views on YouTube. Third song "Sarso Ke Sagiya" released on 13 June 2017 on official YouTube handle of "Worldwide Records Bhojpuri" and he crossed over 166 million views on YouTube.

Track listing
No.	Title	Lyrics	Singer(s)	Length
1.	"Kawna Devta Ke Garhal Sawarl"	Shyam Dehati	Khesari Lal Yadav	4:43
2.	"Laga Ke Fair Lovely"	Shyam Dehati	Khesari Lal Yadav, Khushboo Jain	4:23
3.	"Balamuwa Ho Tohre Se Pyar"	Rajnish Mishra	Khesari Lal Yadav, Kalpana Patowary	3:57
4.	"Sarso Ke Sagiya"	Pyare Lal Yadav	Khesari Lal Yadav, Priyanka Singh	3:25
5.	"E Ka Humke Piyawle Re"	Pyare Lal Yadav	Khesari Lal Yadav, Khushboo Jain	4:09
6.	"Fatkat Rahni Chawur"	Shyam Dehati	Indu Sonali	3:17
7.	"Kaddu Katayi T Sab Me Batayi"	Pyare Lal Yadav	Rajnish Mishra, Anand Mohan	3:35
8.	"Jan Gayini Ye Ho Jaan"	Rajnish Mishra	Khesari Lal Yadav, Kalpana Patowary	4:07
9.	"Sakhi Re Bar Paa Gayini"	Pyare Lal Yadav	Indu Sonali, Khesari Lal Yadav	5:05
10.	"Jayi Jaroor Jeke Jaye Ke Ba Jahiya"	Pyare Lal Yadav	Alok Kumar	4:35
Total length:				41:16

== Marketing ==
The film was streamed online on 29 July 2017 at online video platform site YouTube and create a record of the third Bhojpuri film to get 40 million views on YouTube after "Nirahua Rikshawala 2" and "Nirahua Hindustani 2" till April 2018. He got over 122 million views on YouTube.

== Award and nominations ==
Ceremony	Venue	Category	Recipient(s) and nominee(s)	Result	Ref.
Sabrang Film Awards 2018	Mumbai	Best Actor (Male)	Khesari Lal Yadav	Won	
Sabrang Film Awards 2018	Mumbai	Best Actor (Female)	Kajal Raghwani	Won	
Sabrang Film Awards 2018	Mumbai	Most Popular Singer	Priyanka Singh	Won	
Sabrang Film Awards 2018	Mumbai	Best Playback Singer (Male)	Khesari Lal Yadav	Nominated	
Sabrang Film Awards 2018	Mumbai	Best Playback Singer (Female)	Khushboo Jain; Indu Sonali	Nominated	
Sabrang Film Awards 2018	Mumbai	Best Music Director	Rajnish Mishra	Won	
Sabrang Film Awards 2018	Mumbai	Best Debutant Director	Rajnish Mishra	Won	
Sabrang Film Awards 2018	Mumbai	Best Story	Rajnish Mishra	Won	
Sabrang Film Awards 2018	Mumbai	Best Film	Mehandi Laga Ke Rakhna	Won	
Sabrang Film Awards 2018	Mumbai	Best Choreography	Kanu Mukharjee	Nominated	
Sabrang Film Awards 2018	Mumbai	Best Actor In Supporting Role	Awadhesh Mishra	Won	
Sabrang Film Awards 2018	Mumbai	Best Actor In Comic Role	Sanjay Mahanand	Nominated	
Sabrang Film Awards 2018	Mumbai	Best Lyrics	Pyare Lal Yadav	Won	
