= Duns (film) =

2025 Bhojpuri-language action film

- Theatrical release poster
- Directed by: Dhiraj Thakur
- Starring: Khesari Lal Yadav, Shweta Sen, Shahwar Ali Khan
- Cinematography: Shravan Natarajan
- Release date: 21 February 2025
- Country: India
- Language: Bhojpuri

Duns is a 2025 Indian Bhojpuri-language action film directed by Dhiraj Thakur and starring Khesari Lal Yadav, Shweta Sen, and Shahwar Ali Khan. The film features music by Krishna Bedardi and Aryan Potter and was produced by Rajkumar Singh. It tells the story of a young man navigating challenges in a world of loyalty, friendship, and courage.

== Plot ==
Jatadhar, a young man, works under Jagan, who is employed by Michael. As he navigates the dangerous world of rival gangs and complex relationships, he faces numerous challenges and adventures. The film explores themes of loyalty, friendship, and courage.

== Cast ==
- Khesari Lal Yadav as Jatadhar
- Shweta Sen as Kamli
- Shahwar Ali Khan

== Production ==
Filming took place in Patna and Varanasi over three months. Dhiraj Thakur directed the film.

The film's motion graphics editing and publicity poster design were handled by Krish Gfx.

== Marketing ==
The official trailer for Duns was released on 1 February 2025, a few days before its theatrical release. Several promotional events were held in Bihar and Jharkhand, and songs from the film were released on YouTube, gaining attention among audiences.

== Release ==
The film was theatrically released on 21 February 2025 in Bihar and Jharkhand. The film later became available on regional OTT platforms.
