= Bhag Khesari Bhag =

2019 Indian Bhojpuri film

- Bhag Khesari Bhag Official Poster
- Directed by: Premanshu Singh
- Written by: Manoj K Kushwaha
- Screenplay by: Premanshu Singh; Manoj K Kushwaha
- Story by: Premanshu Singh; Manoj K Kushwaha
- Produced by: Umashankar Prasad
- Starring: Khesari Lal Yadav; Smriti Sinha; Amit Shukla; Ayaz Khan; Sanjay Verma
- Cinematography: Sarfaraj Rashid Khan
- Edited by: Jitendra Singh (Jeetu)
- Music by: Om Jha
- Production company: J P Star Pictures
- Distributed by: Yashi Films
- Release date: 1 November 2019 (Bihar)
- Country: India
- Language: Bhojpuri

Bhaag Khesari Bhaag (transl. Run Khesari run) is a 2019 Indian Bhojpuri language sports drama film directed by Premanshu Singh and produced by Umashankar Prasad with co-produced by Ayush Raj Gupta under banner of "J P Stars Pictures". Its star Khesari Lal Yadav and Smriti Sinha in lead roles. While Ayaz Khan, Amit Shukla, Sanjay Verma, Amit Choudhary, Satya Prakash, Pritam Kumar, Rahul Sahu and others in supporting roles. The story was written by Manoj Kushwaha.

== Cast ==
- Khesari Lal Yadav
- Smriti Sinha
- Ayaz Khan
- Amit Shukla
- Sanjay Verma
- Amit Choudhary
- Satya Prakash
- Pritam Kumar
- Rahul Sahu

== Production ==
The film is directed by Premanshu Singh and produced by Umashankar Prasad with co-produced by Ayush Raj Gupta and written by Manoj K Kushwaha. The cinematography has been done by Sarfaraj Rashid Khan while choreography is by Rikki Gupta and Ram Devan. Jitendra Singh (Jeetu) is the editor. Dress designing by Bhojpuri's famous dio Kavita-Sunita.

== Release ==
The film was theatrically released on 1 November 2019 on occasion of Chhath Pooja across all theatres of Bihar and Jharkhand.

== Music ==
Bhag Khesari Bhag

Soundtrack album by Om Jha
- Released: 2019
- Venue: Mumbai
- Studio: Yashi Films
- Genre: Feature film soundtrack
- Length: 23:23
- Language: Bhojpuri
- Label: Enter10 Music Bhojpuri

Music of "Bhag Khesari Bhag" is composed by Om Jha with lyrics penned by Pyare Lal Yadav, Azad Singh, Shyam Dehati, Prakash Barood, Yadav Raj and Pawan Pandey. It is produced under the "Enter10 Music Bhojpuri" Music compony.

His song "Biscuit Dubake" released on 27 October 2019, was crossed over 20 million views on YouTube.

Track listing
No.	Title	Lyrics	Singer(s)	Length
1.	"Odhni Ke Kona Mein"	Pyare Lal Yadav	Khesari Lal Yadav, Priya Singh Rajpoot	3:43
2.	"Bhag Khesari Bhag Theme Song"	Premanshu Singh	Om Jha, Jatinder Singh	2:42
3.	"Biyahwa Ke Baad Milega"	Shyam Dehati	Khesari Lal Yadav, Honey B	3:31
4.	"Ka Se Kamaayib"	Prakash Barood	Khesari Lal Yadav, Priyanka Maurya	2:59
5.	"Muswe Jaisan Bolhab Ho"	Pawan Pandey	Khesari Lal Yadav, Priyanka Singh	3:05
6.	"Biscuit Dubake"	Azad Singh	Khesari Lal Yadav, Priyanka Singh	3:27
7.	"Meri Wali Mast Hai"	Azad Singh	Khesari Lal Yadav, Khushboo Jain, Om Jha	3:56
Total length:				23:23
