= Kehunia =

Kehunia Kehunia Roari
- village
- Location in Bihar, India Kehunia (India)
- Coordinates: 27°02′10″N 84°27′21″E
- Country: India
- State: Bihar
- District: West Champaran

Languages
  - Official: Bhojpuri, Hindi
- Time zone: UTC+5:30 (IST)
- PIN: 845453
- ISO 3166 code: IN-BR
- Vidhan Sabha constituency: Narkatiaganj

Kehunia is a village about 10 km from Narkatiaganj and 40 km from Bettiah in the West Champaran district of Bihar state in northern India.

== Demographics ==
As of the 2011 India census, Kehunia had a population of 4866 in 1032 households. Males constitute 51.13% of the population and females 48.86%. Kehunia has an average literacy rate of 49.48%, lower than the national average of 74%: male literacy is 59.5%, and female literacy is 40.4%.

== Famous personalities ==
- Krishna Kumar Mishra, politician
- Rajnish Mishra, director
