= Suno Sasurji =

- Directed by: Subbarao Gosangi
- Written by: Subbarao Gosangi
- Screenplay by: Surendra Mishra
- Story by: Subbarao Gosangi
- Produced by: Iqbal E. Makani
- Starring: Rishabh Kashyap; Richa Dixit; Awadhesh Mishra; Kiran Yadav
- Cinematography: Prakash
- Edited by: Santosh Harwade
- Music by: Rajesh Jha
- Production companies: Dreamcather Productions; R.K.J. Films
- Distributed by: Wave Music
- Release date: 2 March 2018
- Running time: 155 minutes
- Country: India
- Language: Bhojpuri

Suno Sasurji is a 2018 Indian Bhojpuri language action thriller film written and directed by Subbarao Gosangi and produced by Iqbal E. Makani. The film stars Rishabh Kashyap (Golu) and Richa Dixit in leading roles while Awadhesh Mishra, Kiran Yadav, Mehnaaz, Mantu Lal, Tej Bahadur, Surendra Mishra, Gowri Shankar, Vijay Prasad and other in supporting roles.

== Cast ==
- Rishabh Kashyap
- Richa Dixit
- Awadhesh Mishra
- Kiran Yadav
- Mehnaaz
- Mantu Lal
- Tej Bahadur
- Surendra Mishra
- Gowri Shankar
- Vijay Prasad

== Music ==
The music of Suno Sasurji is composed by Rajesh Jha with lyrics penned by Pyare Lal Yadav, Manoj Matlabi, Shyam Dehati and Yadav Raj. It is produced under the "Wave Music" Label.

== Marketing ==
Trailer was this movie was released on 22 January 2018 at official YouTube channel of "Wave Music", who also bought his satellite rights.
