= Sajan Chale Sasural =

2011 Bhojpuri-language film

Sajan Chale Sasural is a 2011 Bhojpuri-language film starring Khesari Lal Yadav and Smrity Sinha in the lead roles. This films marks as the film debut of Khesari Lal Yadav. The sequel to this film Sajan Chale Sasural 2 released in 2017.

== Cast ==
- Khesari Lal Yadav
- Smrity Sinha

== Soundtrack ==
- "Looser Mein" by Khesari Lal Yadav
- "Bhaiya Arab Gaile Na" by Khesari Lal Yadav, Indu Sonali
- "Tohra Mein Basela Paranva Ho" by Khesari Lal Yadav, Anamika Singh
- "Mat Der Kara" by Raja Hasan, Tripti Shakya
- "Saiyan Ho Ab Leja" by Aalok Kumar, Anamika Singh
- "Haldi Song" by Indu Sonali, Anamika Singh
- "Aaj Dharti Pe Aise" by Udit Narayan, Kushboo Jain
- "Kaisan Bhudwa K Charitrawa" by Tripti Shakya
- "Bachpan ke Saathi" by Shivam Bihari, Rachna Chopra
