= Yadav Pan Bhandar =

2018 film

Yadav Pan Bhandar is a 2018 Bhojpuri-language film directed by Ajay Kumar and starring Manoj Tiwari and Gunjan Pant in the lead role.

== Cast ==
- Manoj Tiwari
- Gunjan Pant
- Manoj Tiger
- Brijesh Tripathi
- Ayaz Khan
- Reena Rani

== Soundtrack ==
- "Tohre par gorki bhail diwani"
- "Kanha ke ghar pe gareeb aa gaye hain"
