= Global Baba =

- Directed by: Manoj Sidheshwari Tewari
- Screenplay by: Vishal Vijay Kumar
- Story by: Surya Kumar Upadhayay
- Produced by: Vijay Bansal; Priya bansal Harsh Vardhan Ojha
- Starring: Abhimanyu Singh; Sandeepa Dhar; Ravi Kishan; Pankaj Tripathi; Sanjay Mishra; Akhilendra Mishra; Indal Singh; Ankur Yashraj
- Cinematography: Devendra Tiwari; D Kannan
- Edited by: Chandan Arora
- Music by: Ripul Sharma; Agnel Roman; Faizan Hussain
- Release date: 11 March 2016
- Running time: 120 minutes
- Country: India
- Language: Hindi

Global Baba (transl. Global Baba) is a 2016 Indian film directed by Manoj Sidheshwari Tewari, starring Pankaj Tripathi, Abhimanyu Singh and Ravi Kishan.

Certain scenes of the film were shot in Daman and Diu.

== Cast ==
- Abhimanyu Singh as Chillam Pehlwaan/ Global Baba
- Pankaj Tripathi as Damru
- Ravi Kishan as Jacob
- Sandeepa Dhar as Bhavana Sharma
- Akhilendra Mishra as Dallu Yadav
- Sanjay Mishra as Bhola Pandit
- Khesari Lal Yadav (special appearance in the song "Holi Mein Ude")

== Soundtrack ==
Track listing
No.	Title	Lyrics	Music	Singer(s)	Length
1.	"Babayog"	Shurya Upadhyay	Ripul Sharma	Divya Kumar, Nigel S Fox	2:59
2.	"Maula"	Shurya Upadhyay	Ripul Sharma	Ripul Sharma	4:45
3.	"Baba Tharki"	Shurya Upadhyay	Ripul Sharma	Bhavika Parihar, Moumita Das, Sony Ravan	2:43
4.	"Holi Mein Ude"	Shurya Upadhyay	Angel Roman, Faizan Hussain	Khesari Lal Yadav, Sona Mohapatra	3:46
Total length:					14:13

== Critical reception ==
The Hindu called it "a film that might be loud but does talk sense."
