= Dabang Sarkar =

Bhojpuri Film

- Deep and
- Directed by: Yogesh Raj Mishra
- Written by: Manoj Pandey; Yogesh Raj Mishra
- Produced by: Deepak Kumar; Rahul Vohra
- Starring: Khesari Lal Yadav; Kajal Raghwani; Akansha Awshthi; Sanjay Pandey
- Cinematography: Amitabh Chandra; Ravindranath Guru
- Edited by: AmitRishi Ramadevi; Mahtab Haider
- Music by: Narendra Sinha; Vinay
- Production companies: Sea View Films Presents; Creator’s Lab Pvt. Ltd
- Distributed by: Creator's Lab
- Release date: 30 November 2018 (India)
- Country: India
- Language: Bhojpuri

Dabang Sarkar is a 2018 Indian Bhojpuri-language action drama film directed by Yogesh Raj Mishra and produced by Deepak Kumar and Rahul Vohra. It stars Khesari Lal Yadav and Akansha Awshthi. Sanjay Pandey, Deepika Tripathi, Anoop Arora, Samarth Chaturvedi, CP Bhatt, Jayashankat Pandey, Vineet Vishal and others play supporting roles. Kajal Raghwani makes a special appearance in a song.

== Plot ==
Veeru's dad, who worked at a drug factory, was killed and wrongly blamed for a crime. Driven by anger, Veeru becomes a cop to get back at his dad's killers and stop crime.

== Cast ==
- Khesari Lal Yadav as Veeru/Veer Pratap Singh
- Kajal Raghwani as Special Appearance
- Aakansha Awshthi as
- Deepika Tripathi as Pari
- Sanjay Pandey as Inspector Tripathi
- Krishna Kumar as Inspector Ajay
- Anoop Arora as Veeru's Father
- Samarth Chaturvedi as MLA
- C P Bhatt as Constable
- Vineet Vishal
- Jay Shanker Pandey
- Mahesh Chandra Deva
- Sandeep Yadav
- Mr Tsk
- Ayushi Tiwari
- Subhash
- Pradeep Yadav
- Ajay Singh
- Dinesh Tiwari

== Soundtrack ==
Dabang Sarkar

Soundtrack album by Dhananjay Mishra
- Released: 2018
- Venue: Mumbai
- Studio: Yashi Music Pvt. Ltd.
- Genre: Feature film soundtrack
- Length: 32:19
- Language: Bhojpuri
- Label: Zee Music Company
- Producer: Dhananjay Mishra

Dhananjay Mishra chronology
Sangharsh (2018)	Dabang Sarkar (2018)	Jai Veeru (2019)

The soundtrack for "Dabang Sarkar" was composed by Dhananjay Mishra, with lyrics penned by Pyare Lal Yadav & Azad Singh. It was produced under the "Yashi Films" label. Background music was scored by Narendra Sinha and Vinay. The soundtrack was released in Zee Music Company, which consists of seven songs. The full album is recorded by Khesari Lal Yadav, Priyanka Singh, Alok Kumar, Rini Chandra, Honey B, Neetu Singh and Jeetendra Singh.

=== Tracklist ===
No.	Title	Singer(s)	Length
1.	"Pagal Banaibe Kare Patarki"	Khesari Lal Yadav, Priyanka Singh
2.	"A Ho Madam Ji Man Jaiye"	Khesari Lal Yadav, Priyanka Singh
3.	"Mitha Boli Bol Ke"	Khesari Lal Yadav, Priyanka Singh
4.	"Badi Uthe Darad"	Khesari Lal Yadav, Reeni Chandra
5.	"Jawani Tohar Jhal Jhal Jhalke"	Khesari Lal Yadav, Priyanka Singh
6.	"Behna Tohar Age"	Khesari Lal Yadav
7.	"Title Song"	Jitendra Singh
8.	"Navratna Tel Lagawala Se"	Khesari Lal Yadav, Nitu Singh
9.	"Chehra Tohar Jhal Jhal Jhalke"	Alok Kumar, Honey B

== Marketing and release ==
On 8 May 2018, Yogesh Raj Mishra unveiled the first look poster of the film. The three official teasers of the film were released first on 29 May 2018, second on 7 June 2018 and third on 15 June 2018 respectively by Yashi Films on YouTube. Official trailer of the film was released on 31 August 2018 by Zee Music Bhojpuri official YouTube handel and he crossed over 4.9 million views until now.

The film was released in India on 30 November 2018.

The film was released at Online video platform site YouTube on 5 February 2019 at the official channel of "Yashi Films" and quickly became the top trending video with 4 million views in few days. As of May 2020, the film has amassed over 22 million view on YouTube.

== Award and nominations ==
Ceremony	Venue	Category	Recipient(s) and nominee(s)	Result	Ref.
Bhojpuri Cine Awards 2019	Kolkata	Best Music Director	Dhananjay Mishra	Won	
