= Anara Gupta =

Indian model (born 1989)

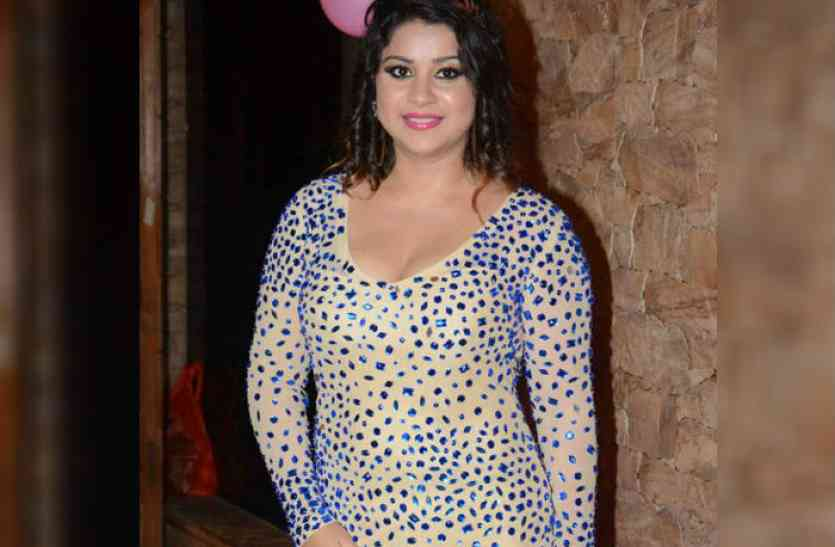
- Born: Anara Gupta; 29 August 1989 (age 36); Jammu, India
- Modeling information
- Hair color: Black
- Eye color: Brown

Aanara Gupta (born 29 August 1989) is an Indian model who won the Miss Jammu beauty pageant in 2001. An Indian actor, model and media personality she is primarily known for her work in Bhojpuri films. She has also appeared in Hindi, Telugu, Tamil films, as well as films in other languages. Gupta is one of the most popular Bhojpuri actresses and she is also said to be the highest paid Bhojpuri actress. She has received many awards.

== Early life ==
Gupta was born on 29 August 1989 to Mr. Ram Singh and Raj Rani. Born in a family of six she has three brothers and no sisters. She attended DBN Vidya Mandir School in Jammu. She was very interested in cricket while attending school. She was also an active member of NCC and has done a BLC. She won the title of Miss Jammu in 2006 and then moved to tinsel town for work.

== Career ==
She appeared in numerous Bhojpuri films and was the reigning queen of Bhojpuri cinema at her peak. She appeared in a Bhojpuri dance reality show Nach Nachiya Doom Machiya broadcast on Mahuaa TV. The judges were Ganesh Acahrya, Sudha Chandran, and Kanu Mukherjee. She finished first runner up on the show which elevated her popularity to another level.

Her first Hindi film was Miss Aanara and she then went on to do other films.

In May 2005 she travelled with her mother to New Delhi and met with officials of the National Commission for Women and the National Human Rights Commission to ask them to investigate alleged police misconduct.

In August 2005 she was reportedly starring in a movie about her career and ordeal, produced by Ashok Pandit. She also acted in the TV series Sulegti Rahen. In March 2006 she was reported to have moved to Mumbai in order to star in a Bollywood movie about her life, produced by K K Yadava and Aaditya Kulshreshtha. The movie, titled Miss Anara, was released in June 2007 and was poorly received. It alleges that a police officer produced a porn movie with a hidden camera in order to make sexual advances at Gupta while she was imprisoned.

The High Court of Jammu and Kashmir closed the case in December 2005 without charging Gupta. Social activist Amit Chouhan pressed for a reopening of the case, concerned that evidence about a pornography ring involving young girls and high-ranking politicians was being suppressed.

In August 2006 a fresh investigation into the case was begun, on order of the High Court of Jammu and Kashmir.
