= Anjana Singh =

Indian Bhojpuri actress

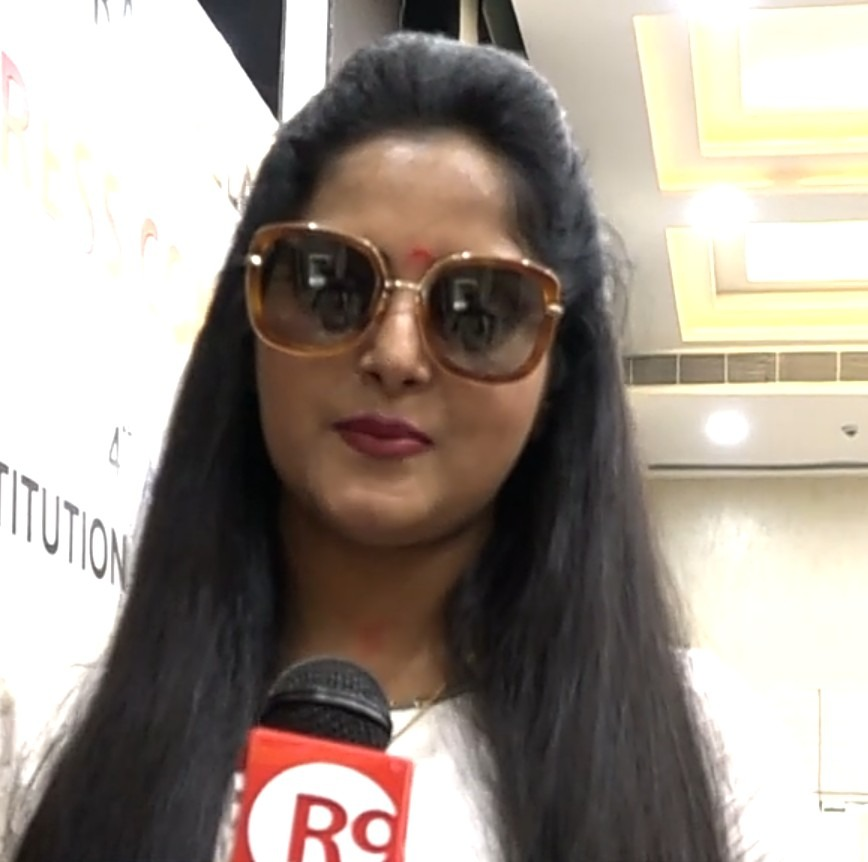
- Anjana Singh in 2019
- Born: 7 August 1990 (age 36); Lucknow, Uttar Pradesh, India
- Occupation: Actress
- Years active: 2012–present
- Notable work: Love Aur Rajneeti; Nagraj; Sanki Daroga
- Spouse: Yash Kumarr (m. 2013; div. 2018)

Anjana Singh is an Indian actress. She mainly works in Bhojpuri films and television serials. She made her on-screen debut with Ek Aur Faulad (2012) and her Bhojpuri television debut was Bhag Na Bache Koi.

== Filmography ==
Her latest video Radhe Radhe track on trading on the occasion of Lord Krishna Janmashtami.

Year	Film	Co-actors	Language
2012	Ek Aur Faulad		Bhojpuri
2012	Lahoo Ke Do Rang		Bhojpuri
2012	Lawarish		Bhojpuri
2012	Kaisan Piyawa Ke Charitar Ba		Bhojpuri
2012	Dil Le Gai Odhaniya Wali	Khesari Lal Yadav	Bhojpuri
2013	Raja Ji I Love You		Bhojpuri
2013	Saansar		Bhojpuri
2013	Truck Driver		Bhojpuri
2013	Vardiwala Gunda		Bhojpuri
2013	Dildar Sawariya		Bhojpuri
2013	Tuhi To Meri Jan Hai Radha		Bhojpuri
2014	Hathkadi		Bhojpuri
2014	Lahoo Pukarela		Bhojpuri
2014	Khoon Bhari Hamaar Maang		Bhojpuri
2014	Andhi Toofan		Bhojpuri
2014	Ek Nirahua Sarfira		Bhojpuri
2014	Baba Rangeela		Bhojpuri
2014	Pyar Mohabat Zindabad		Bhojpuri
2014	Dil Lagal Duppata Wali Se		Bhojpuri
2014	Dil Le Gai Odhganiya Wali		Bhojpuri
2014	Bihari Rikshawala		Bhojpuri
2014	Garda		Bhojpuri
2014	Ladaai		Bhojpuri
2014	Katta Tanal Dupatta Par		Bhojpuri
2014	Karela KLamal Dhartiu Ke Lal		Bhojpuri
2014	Kachche Dhaage		Bhojpuri
2015	Bahurani		Bhojpuri
2015	Lagi Tohse Lagan		Bhojpuri
2015	Ei Kaisan Pyar		Bhojpuri
2015	Hasina Maan Jayegi		Bhojpuri
2015	Gola Barood		Bhojpuri
2015	HamSe BadhKar Kaun		Bhojpuri
2016	Ballia Ke Dabangai		Bhojpuri
2016	Beta		Bhojpuri
2016	Mokama 0 KM		Bhojpuri
2016	Dil Hai Ki Manta Nahi		Bhojpuri
2016	Dabang Aashiq		Bhojpuri
2016	Khiladi		Bhojpuri
2016	Hero GamchaWala		Bhojpuri
2016	Doodh Ka Karz		Bhojpuri
2016	Love Aur Rajneeti		Bhojpuri
2016	Jouthi Tu Sethi Mu		Oriya
2016	Rani Dilbarjani		Bhojpuri
2017	Gundey Hai Hum		Bhojpuri
2017	Gundey		Bhojpuri
2017	Rangila		Bhojpuri
2017	Jigar		Bhojpuri
2017	Tere Jaise Yaar Kaha		Bhojpuri
2017	Trishool		Bhojpuri
2017	Sherdil Ghatak		Bhojpuri
2018	Nagraj		Bhojpuri
2018	Sanki Daroga		Bhojpuri
2018	Badrinath		Bhojpuri
2018	Khuddar		Bhojpuri
2018	Shiva Banal Don		Bhojpuri
2018	Munna Mawali		Bhojpuri
2018	Badla Hindustani Ka		Bhojpuri
2018	Maai Ke Biruwa		Bhojpuri
2018	Shahenshah		Bhojpuri
2019	Maine Unko Sajan Chun Liya		Bhojpuri
2019	Bitiya Chhati Mai Ke		Bhojpuri
2024	ghar ki malkin		Bhojpuri
2019	Saiyaan Ji Dagabaaz		Bhojpuri
2020	Kasam Paida Karne Wale Ki 2		Bhojpuri

== Awards and nominations ==
Ceremony	Category	Year	Film	Result	Reference
International Bhojpuri Film Awards show London	Best Actress Viewers Choice	2017		Won	
International Bhojpuri Film Awards show Malaysia	Best Actress	2018	Jigar	Won	

== See also ==
- List of Bhojpuri cinema actresses
