= Sangharsh (2018 film) =

Bhojpuri Film

- Theatrical Release Poster
- Directed by: Parag Patil
- Written by: Rakesh Tripati
- Produced by: Ratnakar Kumar
- Starring: Khesari Lal Yadav; Kajal Raghwani; Awadhesh Mishra; Ritu Singh; Sanjay Mahanand; Dev Singh
- Cinematography: R. R. Prince
- Edited by: Gurjant Singh
- Music by: Score: Aslam Surty; Songs: Dhananjay Mishra; Madhukar Anand
- Production companies: Worldwide Channel; Jitendra Gulati Presents
- Release date: 24 August 2018
- Running time: 152 minutes
- Language: Bhojpuri

Sangharsh is a 2018 Indian Bhojpuri language film directed by Parag Patil and produced by Ratnakar Kumar. Khesari Lal Yadav and Kajal Raghwani are in lead roles. Awadhesh Mishra, Ritu Singh, Dev Singh, Sanjay Mahanand and Deepak Sinha in supporting roles.

The film was released on 3 November 2019 on YouTube official channel of "Worldwide Records Bhojpuri" and quickly became the top trending video and create records in Bhojpuri cinema with 10 million views in just 3 days. As of May 2020, the film has amassed over 62 million view on YouTube.

== Plot ==
"Sangharsh" highlights one of the most pressing issues of our times: women's empowerment. Through the conflicting perspectives of two men, the film examines the conservative mindset of a highly patriarchal society, how women are oppressed by it and why a change for the better is necessary. He support Indian government slogans "Beti Bachao Beti Padhao".

== Cast ==
- Khesari Lal Yadav, as Kanhaiya
- Kajal Raghwani, as Rukhmani (Kanhaiya's Wife)
- Awadhesh Mishra, as Loha Yadav (Kanhaiya's Father)
- Ritu Singh as Radha
- Nisha Jha as Sweaty (Kanhaiya's Daughter)
- Dev Singh as Prem (Sweaty's Boyfriend)
- Sanjay Mahanand as Damru (Kanhaiya's Friend)
- Deepak Sinha as Rukhmani's Father
- Ratnakar Kumar as Schools Principal
- Sonu Pandey as House Owner

== Release ==
Sangharsh was released on 24 August 2018 on Hindu Festival Raksha Bandhan all over India. It also received mostly positive reviews and one of the Biggest Hit of 2018 in Bhojpuri Cinema .

== Soundtrack ==
Sangharsh

Soundtrack album by Dhananjay Mishra & Madhukar Anand
- Released: 2018
- Venue: Mumbai
- Studio: Worldwide Records Bhojpuri
- Genre: Feature film soundtrack
- Language: Bhojpuri
- Label: Worldwide Records Bhojpuri
- Producer: Ratnakar Kumar

Music of this film was given by Dhananjay Mishra and Madhukar Anand and lyrics penned by Pyare Lal Yadav, Azad Singh and Pawan Pandey. The soundtrack included an unusually large number of songs at 9. It was produced under "Worldwide Records" label. All songs of this film sung by Khesari Lal Yadav, Priyanka Singh, Indu Sonali, Honey B, Neetu Shri and Jitendra Singh.

=== Track listing ===
No.	Title	Singer(s)	Length
1.	"Satuva Jawaniya Ke"	Khesari Lal Yadav, Neetu Shri
2.	"Tohar Hothwa Laage la"	Khesari Lal Yadav, Priyanka Singh
3.	"Dhoval Badu Doodh Se"	Khesari Lal Yadav, Priyanka Singh
4.	"Dekhi Sughraee"	Khesari Lal Yadav
5.	"Chatar Chatar ho"	Khesari Lal Yadav, Priyanka Singh
6.	"Dil Badtamiz Ho Gayil"	Khesari Lal Yadav
7.	"Dil Jable Jagal Baani"	Khesari Lal Yadav, Honey
8.	"Raja Janakji Ke Angana"	Indu Sonali
9.	"Sangharsh (Title song)"	Jitendra Singh

== Awards ==
The film won 11 awards at the Sabrang Film Awards, including Best Film, Best Director for Parag Patil, Best Actor for Khesari Lal Yadav, Best Actress for Kajal Raghwani, Best Story Writer for Rakesh Tripathi, Best Actor In Supporting Role for Awdhesh Mishra, Best Actress In Supporting Role for Reena Rani, Best Playback Singer (Male) for Khesari Lal Yadav, Best Background Score for Aslam Surti, Best Cinematography for R. R. Prince and Best Costume Design for Badshah Khan.

In Bhojpuri Cinema Screen & Stage Awards (2019), held at Netaji Indoor Stadium, Kolkata on 21 September 2019. The film won four awards including Best Film, Best Director for Parag Patil, Best Actor for Khesari Lal Yadav and Best Actress (Critics) for Kajal Raghwani.

In International Bhojpuri Film Awards (2019) held in Singapore, he won four Awards including Best Film (Critics), Best Actor in Leading Role (Female) for Kajal Raghwani, Best Actor in Supporting Role (Male) for Awadhesh Mishra and Best Story Writer for Rakesh Tripathi.
