= Farishta (2023 film) =

2023 Bhojpuri Film

- Directed by: Lal Babu Pandit
- Written by: Arvind Tiwari
- Produced by: S.S. Reddy
- Starring: Khesari Lal Yadav; Meghashree; Pooja Ganguly; Amit Shukla
- Cinematography: R.R. Prince
- Edited by: Jeetendra Singh "Jeetu"
- Music by: Score: Aslam Surty; Songs: Krishna Bedardi
- Production company: Gangotri Studio
- Distributed by: Renu Vijay Films (Bihar)
- Release date: 9 March 2023
- Country: India
- Language: Bhojpuri

Farishta is a 2023 Indian Bhojpuri-language drama film produced by S. S. Reddy, directed by Lal Babu Pandit and written by Arvind Tiwari. It stars Khesari Lal Yadav, Meghashree, Pooja Gaguly, Amit Shukla in the main roles. The story revolves around Murari (Khesari Lal Yadav), a mentally challenged person, who is not accepted by his family.

== Plot ==
The story revolves around Murari a mentally challenged person who is not accepted in his family.

== Cast ==
- Khesari Lal Yadav as Murari, a mentally challenged person
- Meghashree
- Pooja Ganguly
- Amit Shukla, Murari's father
- Sraddha Naval, Murari's mother
- Prakash Jais
- Sonu Pandey
- Rinku Bharti
- Khushboo Yadav

== Production ==
=== Development ===
This was the first time Khesari Lal Yadav was doing a character role. Khesari didn't take bath for 20 days to fit in the character and remained in the costume.

=== Filming ===
The principal photography commenced in May 2022 in Lucknow with the name "Farishte".

== Music ==
Music of the film is given by Krishna Bedardi. The song Pagale Bana Di Ram Ji received 3.6 million views on YouTube within 24 hours of its release.

== Marketing ==
The first look of the film was revealed on 24 January. The trailer of the film released on YouTube on 24 February and got over 10 lakh views in first 24 hours and trended on YouTube not only in India but also in Dubai.

== Release ==
The film released on 9 March 2023 in the theatres across India, on the occasion of Holi.

== Reception ==
The film received great response from the audience and ran housefull in the theatres of Bihar, Uttar Pradesh and Mumbai.
