= Indu Sonali =

Indian singer

- Born: Bhagalpur, Bihar, India
- Genres: Filmi, folk, ambient
- Occupations: painter and recording artist
- Instrument: Vocals
- Years active: 2009–2010
- Labels: Venus, T-Series and Wave Music

Indu Sonali is an Indian playback singer known for singing primarily in Bhojpuri cinema. She has sung for 300 Bhojpuri films and 50 music video albums and is considered as one of the leading playback singers of the Bhojpuri language. Her music genre is primitive-acoustic folk with some traces of Indian classical music, ambient electronic and new age jazz fusion. Some of her most notable songs are "Lehriya Loot Re Raja" (Partigya), "Kahan Jaibe Raja Najariya" (Kaha Jaiba Raja), "Uthha Deb Lenga" (Damadji) and "Devar ho Daba Na Mor Karihaiya" (Rakhwala).

== Early life and career ==
Indu Sonali was born in Bhagalpur (Bihar). She grew up and was educated in Bihar. She made her debut as the playback singer in the Bhojpuri film Panditji Batai Na Biah Kab Hoi, for which Rajesh Gupta was the music director.

She is an ardent fan of Indian singing legend Lata Mangeshkar.

Sonali is a regular performer at electronic and new age jazz fusion oriented music festivals.

In 2016, Sonali recorded the solo devotional album Swaranjali with music director Damodar Raao which was released under music company Sai Recordds.

== Discography ==
Year	Title	Movie	Co-singer(s)	Composer	Lyrics	Music label
2011	"Bhaiya Arab Gaile Na"	Sajan Chale Sasural	Khesari Lal Yadav			
2011	"Haldi Song"	Sajan Chale Sasural	Anamika Singh			
2012	"Dharat Nahi Sejiya	Jaan Tere Naam			Pyarelal Yadav	
2012	"Chadhal Jawaniya"	Jaan Tere Naam			Pyarelal Yadav	
2012	"Chalelu Bhachkat"	Jaan Tere Naam	Khesari Lal Yadav		Pyarelal Yadav	
2018	"Chana Jor Garam"	Channa Jor Garam	Solo			
2025	"Nacha A Baratiya"	Mere Husband Ki Shadi Hai				
	"Chham Chham Nache Hai Radha"	Swaranjali	solo	Damodar Raao	Azad Singh	Sai Recordds
	"Tu Patna Ke Raja Hum Mumbai Ki Rani"	Tu Hamar Hau	Soham	Nikhil, Vinay	Vipin Bahar	T-Series
	Humke Sasura Se Tu Bolbaala Babuji"	Bidaai	solo	Dhananjay Mishra	Vinay Bihari	T-Series
	"Milal Ba Rangdar Balamua"	Rangdar Balamua	solo	Damodar Raao	Vinay Bihari	RCM
	"Saiya Jable Pakadba Rajdhani"	Saiyan Rajdhani Pakadke Aa Jaiha	solo	Damodar Raao	Mangal Bihari	Sai Recordds
	"Aho More Raja Bahinya Mein"	Pandit Ji Batain Na Biyah Kab Hoyee	solo	Rajesh Gupta	Vinay Bihari	T-Series
	"Beri Beri Barjile"	Maai Ke Karz	solo	Damodar Raao	Rajesh MIshra	SRK Music
	"Kahan Jaiba Raja Nazriya Ladaike"	Kahan Jaiba Raja Najareea Ladai Ke	solo	Dhananjay Mishra	Vinay Bihari	T-Series
	"Raja"	Pratiya	solo	Rajesh Rajnish	Vinay Bihari	Venus
	"Hara Patta Paan"	Dushmani	solo	Durga Natraj	Shyam Dehati	T-Series
	"Farak UtDi"	Majnu Motorwala	solo	Damodar Raao	Vinay Bihari	Wave
	"Loot Lela Baby Jalebi Khiya Ke"	Dil Ho Gail Qurbaan	solo	Damodar Raao	Bipin Ojha	Aarya Music
	"TivhhzzRe Balma"	Sajan Ki Bahon Mein	solo	Damodar Raao	Rajesh Mishra	Aarya Music

== See also ==
- Bhojpuri cinema
