= Santosh Mishra =

Bhojpuri film Director, Writer, Actor

- Born: 24 August 1978 (age 48)
- Occupations: Director, music composer, lyricist, screenwriter
- Years active: 1999–present
- Children: 2

Santosh Mishra (born 24 August 1978) is a Bhojpuri film director, writer and music composer, known for his works in Hindi, Bhojpuri and Gujarati films. He is known for directing the Bhojpuri movies like Patna Se Pakistan, Bam Bam Bol Raha Hai Kashi, Mokama 0 km, Border, Nirahua Rickshawala 2 and more than 40 other films.

== Filmography ==
Key
| † | Denotes films that have not yet been released |

| Year | Title | Director | Writer | Actor | Ref. |
|---|---|---|---|---|---|
| 2009 | The Hero - Abhimanyu | Yes | Yes | | |
| 2011 | Mai Nagin Tu Nagina | | Yes | | |
| 2014 | Majnu Motorwala | Yes | | | |
| 2014 | Devra Bhail Deewana | | Yes | | |
| 2015 | Patna Se Pakistan | Yes | Yes | | |
| 2015 | Dulaara | | Yes | | |
| 2015 | Nirahua Rikshawala 2 | | Yes | | |
| 2016 | Nahle Pe Dahla | | Yes | | |
| 2015 | Nirahua Chalal Sasural 2 | | Yes | | |
| 2016 | Bam Bam Bol Raha Hai Kashi | Yes | Yes | | |
| 2016 | Mokama 0 KM | Yes | Yes | | |
| 2017 | Pahali Najar Ko Salam | Yes | Yes | | |
| 2017 | Kashi Amarnath | Yes | Yes | | |
| 2018 | Border | Yes | Yes | | |
| 2019 | Nirahua Chalal London | | Yes | Yes | |
