= Dulhan Ganga Paar Ke =

2018 Indian Bhojpuri Film

- Dulhan Ganga Paar Ke Theatrical Release Poster
- Directed by: Aslam Sheikh
- Written by: Arvind Anand
- Screenplay by: Aslam Sheikh
- Story by: Arvind Anand
- Produced by: Arvind Anand
- Starring: Khesari Lal Yadav; Kajal Raghwani; Awadhesh Mishra; KK Goswami; Amrapali Dubey; Kriti Yadav
- Cinematography: Thamban K
- Edited by: Preetam Naik
- Music by: Manoj Singh
- Production companies: Brand Billa Production Pvt Ltd; Khesari Entertainment
- Distributed by: Yashi Films
- Release dates: 25 May 2018 (Bihar and Jharkhand); 10 August 2018 (Mumbai)
- Running time: 157 minutes
- Country: India
- Language: Bhojpuri

Dulhan Ganga Paar Ke is a 2018 Indian Bhojpuri-language action drama film directed by Aslam Sheikh and produced by Arvind Anand. The film stars Khesari Lal Yadav as Krishna and Kajal Raghwani as Radha, with Awdhesh Mishra, KK Goswami, Dev Singh, Prakash Jais, Shakeela Majeed, Deepak Sinha, and Brijesh Tripathi in supporting roles. The film was Kriti Yadav's debut as a child actress. Actress Amrapali Dubey made a special appearance in the song "Marad Abhi Baccha Ba".

== Cast ==
- Khesari Lal Yadav as Krishna
- Kajal Raghwani as Radha
- KK Goswami as Chota Saajan
- Awadhesh Mishra as MLA's son
- Kriti Yadav as Kriti
- Shakeela Majeed as Krishna's mother
- Deepak S as Krishna's father
- Prakash Jais as Chota Saajan's friend
- Dev Singh as MLA's brother in law
- Brijesh Tripathi as MLA
- Amrapali Dubey as item girl Marad Abhi Baccha Ba

== Production ==
Most scenes were shot at Chanod and Halol in Gujarat, with some scenes also shot in Green Park, Amandi House, Bhullar Garden, Nandan Van, and China Creek in Mumbai.

The cinematography was done by Thamban K; the choreography was done by Kanu Mukerjee, Pappu Khanna, and Rikki Gupta; the visual effects were done by SP Mohit Kumar; the art direction was done by Anjani Tiwari and Ajay Maurya; the editor was Preetam Naik; the action director was Dileep Yadav; the wardrobe was designed by Badshah Khan; and the post-production was done by Audio Lab (Satish Pujari) and Heena Kanojiya.

== Release ==
The film was released on 25 May 2018 in the major areas of Bihar, Jharkhand, and Nepal. The film premiered in around 110 plus theaters and received a huge opening at the box office. The film was originally scheduled to release on 11 May, but the makers of the film later pushed the release date back to 25 May.

On 10 August 2018, the film was released in theatres in Mumbai and Gujarat.

== Soundtrack ==
The music for Dulhan Ganga Paar Ke was composed by Madhukar Anand with lyrics penned by Pyare Lal Yadav, Azad Singh, and Pawan Pandey, and with background music scored by Manoj Singh. The soundtrack was released by the film company Yashi Films, and consists of 8 songs. The full album was recorded by Khesari Lal Yadav, Priyanka Singh, Honey B, Sarodi Bohra and Arya Nandini.

The song "Marad Abhi Bacha", sung by Khesari Lal Yadav and Priyanka Singh, was uploaded to YouTube on 3 September 2018 and has more than 200 million views as of now. Another song from the film, "Dhukur Dhukur", was uploaded to YouTube on 15 September 2018 and has more than 70 million views as of now.

Track listing
No.	Title	Singer(s)	Length
1.	"Marad Abhi Bacha Ba"	Khesari Lal Yadav, Priyanka Singh
2.	"Jawani Leke Udi Jai Kawwa"	Khesari Lal Yadav, Priyanka Singh
3.	"Body Download Ho Jaai"	Khesari Lal Yadav
4.	"Jiyarawa Kare Dhukur Dhukur"	Khesari Lal Yadav, Priyanka Singh
5.	"Dupatta Aasmani"	Khesari Lal Yadav, Honey B
6.	"Godi Ke Maza Palang Me Na"	Khesari Lal Yadav, Honey B
7.	"Khoji Na Balmua Diya Bari"	Khesari Lal Yadav, Sarodi Bohra
8.	"Hamke Maai Se Kariha"	Arya Nandini

== Marketing ==
The full film was uploaded to YouTube on 10 October 2018. The video has over 80 million views as of now.

== Award and nominations ==
Ceremony	Venue	Category	Recipient(s) and nominee(s)	Result	Ref.
Bhojpuri Cine Awards 2019	Kolkata	Best Child Artist	Kriti Yadav	Won	
Sabrang Film Awards 2019	Mumbai	Best Child Artist	Kriti Yadav	Won	
