= Rajnish Mishra =

Indian film and music director

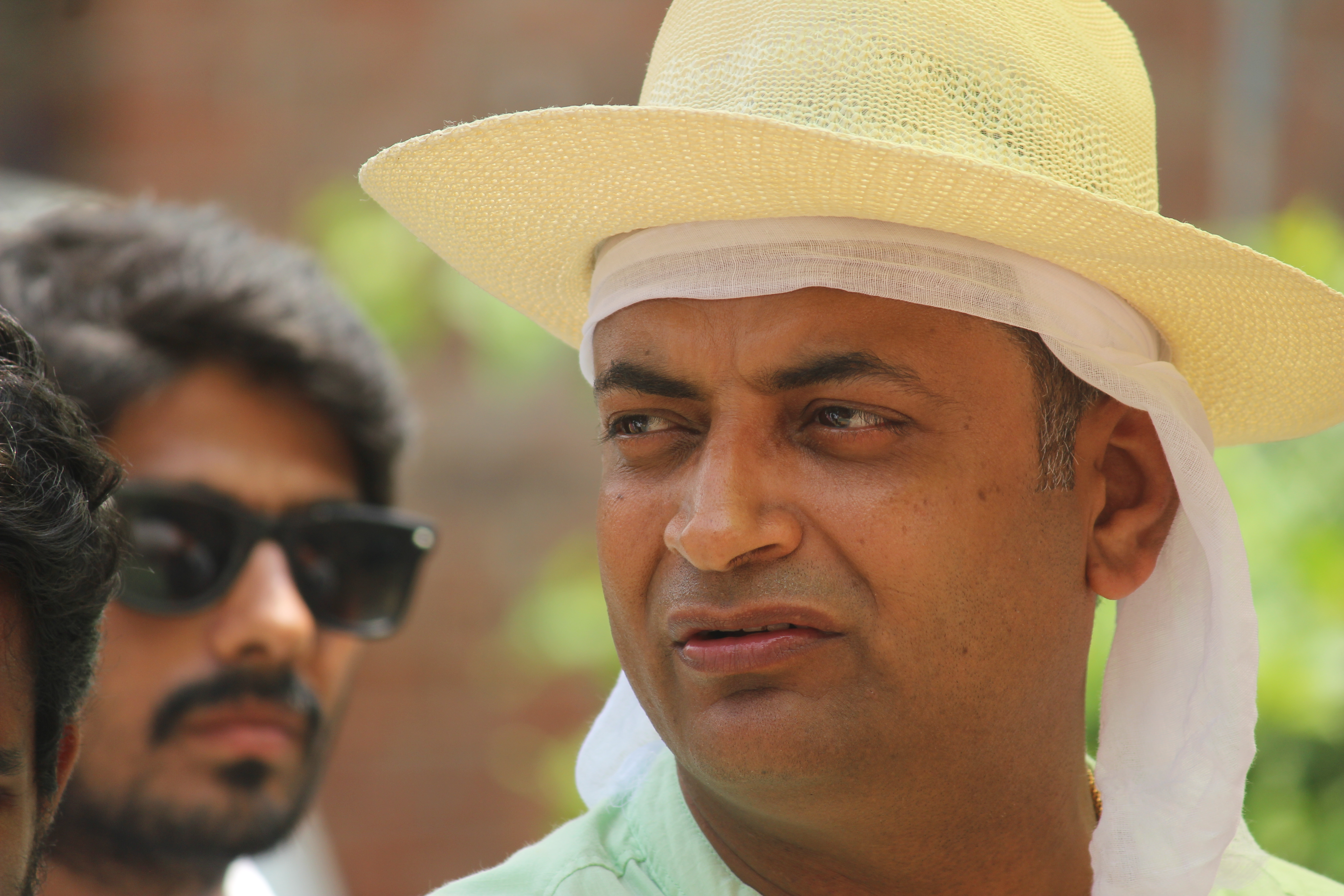

Background information
- Born: Mishir Ji; 16 January 1979 (age 47); Kehunia , Bihar
- Genres: Indian Film Music, Classical music
- Occupations: Film director, Music director
- Years active: 2007–present

Rajnish Mishra is an Indian film and music director known for his contributions to Bhojpuri films. Damru, Mehandi Laga Ke Rakhna and Mai Sehra Bandh Ke Aaunga are some notable films directed by Rajnish Mishra. He made his debut with the blockbuster film, Mehandi Laga Ke Rakhna.

== Filmography ==
Year	Title	Director	Music Director	Writer	Actor	Ref
2015	Patna Se Pakistan		Yes			
2016	Ram Lakhan		Yes			
2016	Bam Bam Bol Raha Hai Kashi		Yes			
2017	Mehandi Laga Ke Rakhna	Yes	Yes	Yes	Yes	
2017	Mai Sehra Bandh Ke Aaunga	Yes	Yes	Yes	Yes	
2018	Deewanapan		Yes			
2018	Border		Yes			
2018	Damru	Yes	Yes			
2018	Mehandi Laga Ke Rakhna 2		Yes			
2018	Nirahua Hindustani 3		Yes			
2018	Ghoonghat Me Ghotala		Yes			
2019	Raajtilak	Yes	Yes	Yes		
2019	Patthar Ke Sanam		Yes			
2020	Mehandi Laga Ke Rakhna 3	Yes	Yes	Yes		
2021	Dulhan Wahi Jo Piya Man Bhaye	Yes	Yes	Yes	Yes	
2021	Jay Shambhu		Yes			

== See also ==
- Bhojpuri cinema
- List of Bhojpuri Films
