= Madhu Sharma =

Indian actress

- Born: Mumbai, Maharashtra, India
- Other name: Dipu
- Occupations: Actress; producer
- Years active: 1998-present
- Spouse: unmarried
- Parent(s): Laxmiram Sharma and Premlata Sharma

Madhu Sharma is an Indian cinema actress and producer. She has produced two Marathi and four Bhojpuri movies. She basically known for Bhojpuri cinema. She worked with all top actors of Bhojpuri such as Ghulami with Dinesh Lal Yadav, Chhapara Ke Prem Kahani with Ravi Kishan, Khiladi with Khesari Lal Yadav and Maa Tujhe Salaam with Pawan Singh.

== Personal life ==
Sharma was born in Jodhpur, Rajasthan and resides in Mumbai as of 2025. "करोड़ों दिलों पर राज करने वाली मधु शर्मा कहां की रहने वाली हैं?". Zee News India.

== Filmography ==
Key
| † | Denotes films that have not yet been released |

| Year | Film Name | Role | Language | Notes |
|---|---|---|---|---|
| 1998 | Guru Paarvai | Sonali | Tamil | |
| 1999 | Anbulla Kadhalukku | Geetha | Tamil | |
| 2003 | Hum Hain Pyaar Mein | | Hindi | |
| 2005 | That is Pandu | Sundari | Telugu | |
| 2005 | Adirindayya Chandram | | Telugu | |
| 2005 | Slokam | | Telugu | |
| 2005 | Gowtam SSC | Brahmaramba | Telugu | |
| 2005 | Ugra Narasimha | | Kannada | |
| 2006 | Party | Madhu | Telugu | |
| 2006 | Pournami | Mohini | Telugu | |
| 2006 | Hanumanthu | Sathyavathi | Telugu | |
| 2007 | Traffic Signal | | Hindi | |
| 2007 | Thavam | | Tamil | Special appearance |
| 2007 | Brahma – The Creator | | Telugu | |
| 2009 | Yuvah | | Kannada | |
| 2009 | Sindhanai Sei | Gayathri | Tamil | |
| 2009 | Pravarakhyudu | | Telugu | |
| 2013 | Ek Duje Ke Liye | | Bhojpuri | Bhojpuri debut |
| 2013 | Dulhe Raja | | Bhojpuri | |
| 2014 | Chhapara Ke Prem Kahani | | Bhojpuri | |
| 2014 | Vaadhdivsachya Haardik Shubhechcha | Medha Kudmude | Marathi | |
| 2014 | Yodhha | | Bhojpuri | Also producer |
| 2015 | Ghulami | | Bhojpuri | Also producer |
| 2016 | Khiladi | Kajal | Bhojpuri | Also producer |
| 2017 | Challenge | | Bhojpuri | Also producer |
| 2018 | Maa Tujhe Salaam | Pooja / Ayat Khan | Bhojpuri | |
| 2019 | Jai Hind | | Bhojpuri | |
| 2020 | Bhaybheet | Dr Kavya | Marathi | |
| 2020 | Balamuwa Kaise Tejab | | Bhojpuri | |
| 2023 | Hum Hai Dulha Hindustani | Madhu | Bhojpuri | |
| 2025 | Power Star | | Bhojpuri | |
