= Khesari Lal Yadav =

Indian actor, singer, comedian and dancer

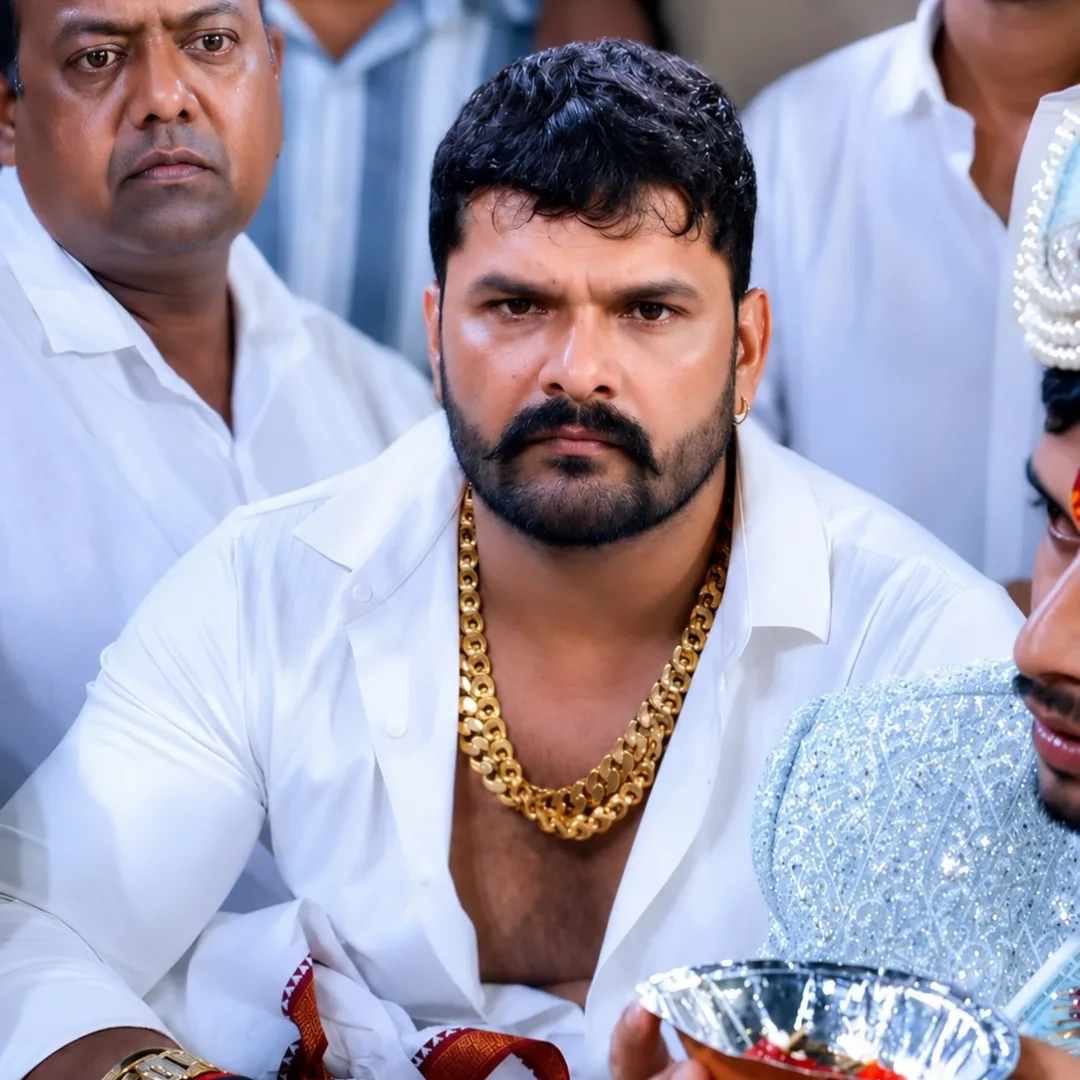
- Yadav in 2026
- Born: Shatrughan Kumar Yadav; 15 March 1986 (age 40); Dhanadih Saran, Bihar, India
- Other names: Trending Star, Mega Star
- Occupations: Actor; singer; dancer; model
- Years active: 2011–present
- Political party: Rashtriya Janata Dal
- Spouse: Chanda Devi (m. 2006)
- Children: 2

Shatrughan Kumar Yadav (born 15 March 1986), known professionally as Khesari Lal Yadav, is an Indian actor, singer, dancer and model who primarily works in Bhojpuri cinema. Yadav has appeared in more than 70 films, and performed as vocalist in more than 5000 songs. Apart from Bhojpuri, he has also worked in Hindi, Awadhi and Haryanvi languages. In 2019, he participated in the reality show Bigg Boss 13.

Born in Chhapra, Bihar, Yadav began his singing career in late 2000s and has had a steady acting career since appearing in Saajan Chale Sasural in 2011. He made his Bollywood debut as a singer in 2014 with "AK-47" in the film Koyelaanchal. He won Best Popular Actor at the 2016 Bhojpuri Film Awards, followed by Best Actor (Male) and Best Playback Singer (Male) at the Sabrang Film Awards in 2018 for his appearance in Mehandi Laga Ke Rakhna. In 2019, he won four more awards for his role in the film Sangharsh.

In 2020, his third Hindi film song and first Hindi-language single "Ladki Patana," was released by Sony Music India which was followed by "Tere Mere Darmiyaan" in 2021. Soon after, He collaborated with Badshah to recreate the "Pani Pani" song in Bhojpuri language. In 2022, he made his debut as a screenwriter with his film Aashiqui. YouTube featured his two songs on its list of the top Indian songs of 2022.

== Life and family ==
Khesari Lal Yadav was born as Shatrughan Kumar Yadav on 15 March 1986 in Dhanadih village of Saran district of Bihar in a low-income family. He got the stage name "Khesari", due to his habit to speak too much as a child, which was analogous to Khesari, a crop, which doesn't need any water or Fertilizer, and grows properly anywhere.

He was not born in his own house, as his parents' mud house had collapsed in the rain, and they had to rent a pucca house, where Khesari was born. His father, Mangaru Lal Yadav, worked as a street vendor selling Chana in the mornings and as a security guard at night to make ends meet. Khesari is one of seven siblings, three of whom are his own brothers. The other four are his uncle's sons, whose mother died at an early age. Khesari's mother stepped in to raise them. His father used to earn in Delhi and he used to live with his mother and uncle in Chhapra. Later his mother also left for Delhi to help her husband with household works and Khesari started living with his siblings and uncle. Khesari used to graze Cattles and sell their milks in his childhood. He married Chanda Devi in 2006. They have a son and a daughter.

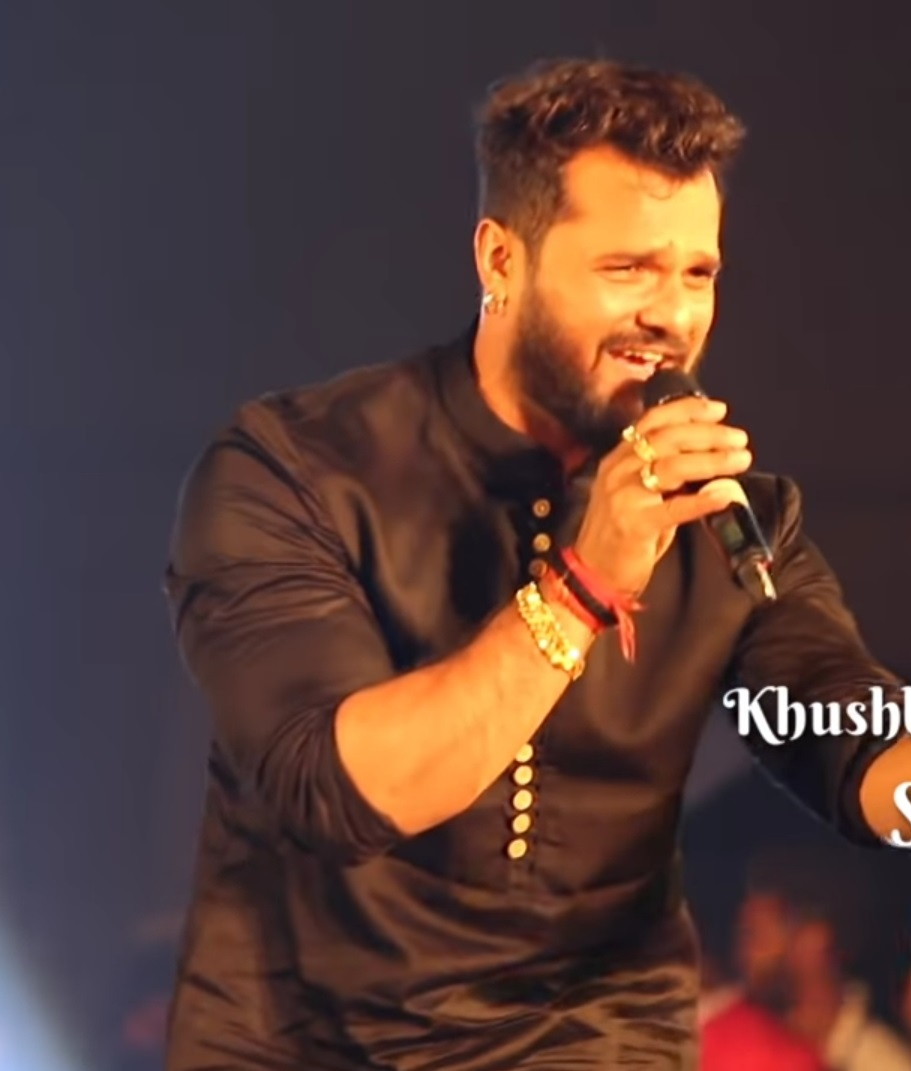
Khesari performing in a stage show

During 1998-99 Yadav started his career as a theatre artist in Bhojpuri theatres, where he used to sing in Ramayana and Mahabharata, he also learnt the Bhojpuri folk dance Launda Naach. Later he also moved to Okhla, Delhi, where he started selling Litti Chokha with his parents and wife. With the money saved after selling Litti-chokha, He launched his first album by spending ₹12,000 but it was a big flop. After that he started working as a servant in Guddu Rangeela's house, who was a famous Bhojpuri singer in those days, after savings some money, he again spent ₹25,000 to launch his second album which got better response from audience and he got some fame. After that he started getting investments in projects from various music companies, but he had to do the marketing by his own. He told in many of his interviews that he himself used to promote his album cassettes in many districts of Bihar and UP, he used to go by train and wherever singing and dancing programs were held during the day or at night. He used to give some money to the sound operator there and ask him to play his song. He told that some people would agree but some people used to abuse and ask him to leave. He also told that sometimes he did not even have money to eat, so he used to sleep without eating.

After getting success as a singer, he moved to Mumbai to work in films. Yadav have disclosed that, the manager of Manoj Tiwari had kept him at Tiwari's house secretly. He learnt fight in this period and then Aalok Kumar starred him in Sajan Chale Sasural, which became a hit and established him as an actor.

== Acting career ==
=== Early years (2012–2016) ===
In 2012, he made his acting debut in Bhojpuri film Sajan Chale Sasural, in which he played the lead role as Sajan, a village boy who goes to town to marry the girl with which his marriage had fixed in his childhood. His second film was Jaan Tere Naam, in which he played the character of a boy who wants to be an actor. Akshaya Kumar, in one of his articles, writes that "the film sets in motion a dialogue about cultural practices that defy the feudal family and awaken its ‘deviant’ anxieties". Between 2012 and 2016 he did 42 Bhojpuri movies including Nagin (2012), Ae Balma Biharwala (2013), Chhapra Express (2013), Pratigya 2 (2014) and Khiladi (2016), which won four awards at Sabrang Film Awards 2017.

=== Establishment and Hindi film debut (2016–present) ===
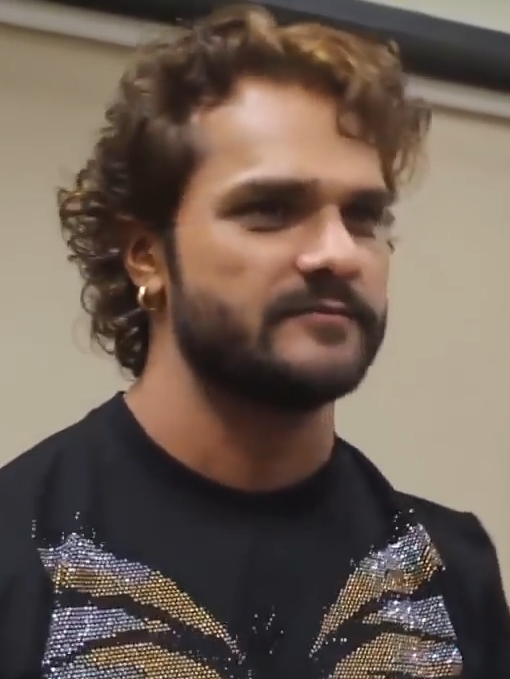
Yadav in 2017

In 2016, he made his Hindi film debut in Global Baba, in which he sang a song titled "Holi Me Ude" and performed in it too with Sandeepa Dhar and Pankaj Tripathi. For his role in Mehandi Laga Ke Rakhna (2017); which is a remake of the Telugu film Aadavari Matalaku Arthale Verule; he won the awards for best actor and best playback singer at Sabrang Film Awards 2018. After doing films like Mai Sehra Bandh Ke Aaunga (2017), Muqaddar (2017), Damru (2018), Dulhan Ganga Paar Ke (2018), he appeared in Sangharsh (2018), which was a film with a social massage supporting the slogan Beti Bachao, Beti Padhao. The film won 19 awards at different award shows. In 2018, Yadav starred in Naagdev, which was the first ever Bhojpuri film to use Vfx. VFX was used in nearly 40% of the movie scenes and it was the first Bhojpuri film to use VFX. His other films in this period are Balam Ji Love You (2018), Dabang Sarkar (2018), Coolie No. 1 (2019). His film Baaghi- Ek Yoddha was a patriotic movie which also talked about the Muzaffarpur shelter case. He also did a sports film named Bhag Khesari Bhag (2019). In 2019, He also made his television debut by participating in the reality show Bigg Boss as a contestant.

His film Mehandi Laga Ke Rakhna 3 (2020) is the remake of the Tamil film Velaiilla Pattadhari. His Dulhan Wahi Jo Piya Man Bhaye (2021) was his first film to be shot overseas, 90% of the film was shot in London. His three more films in 2021 were shot overseas; Chori Chori Chupke Chupke and Pyar Kiya to Nibhana were shot in London whereas Saiyaan Arab Gaile Na was shot in Dubai.

His first release of 2022 was Aashiqui, in which he also made his debut as screenwriter and played the role of an upper caste boy who goes against the traditional values for his love. He next featured in Shadi Ho To Aisi which released in May. He next featured in Dulhaniya London Se Layenge which was shot in London and his co-actors were British Artist Grace Rhodes and Madhu Sharma. His next film Rowdy Inspector released on different dates in parts of India in August 2022, the film is directed by Telugu director Shankar. Meghashree acted in the female lead with Yadav and this was her Bhojpuri debut movie. In August 2022, He made his Haryanvi debut with Sapna Chaudhary on the music album Matak Matak. His next Bhojpuri film Doli Saja Ke Rakhna released in September 2022. The film got many screens across India and Nepal including 25 Multiplexes. On 24 October, his film Bol Radha Bol released. His last film of 2022 was Raja Ki Aayegi Baraat, which released in December.

His first film of 2023 was Farishta, which released on 9 April. Yadav played the character of a mentally challenged person in this film. This film was the biggest Bhojpuri hit of 2023 and ran houseful for weeks in the theatres. After that, Laadla 2 released in September 2023. In October, he starred as a cop in Sangharsh 2, which was his biggest film in terms of budget. It received good response from the audience.

== Music career ==
In his early days, Yadav used to sing in the Ramayan and Mahabharat. His first album was released in 2008. Some of early famous songs are Saiyaan Arab Gaile Na, Piyawa Rahele Saudi Re Bhauji, Maal Bhetai Mela Me. In 2014, he made his Bollywood Debut as a singer in the song "AK-47" from Koyelaanchal. In 2016 he sang his second Bollywood song Holi Me Ude for the film Global Baba. In 2017, he won the award of Best Playback Singer, at Sabrang Film Awards. His notable songs that year were Kawna Devta Ke Garhal Sawaral and Jaan Gaini E Ho Jaan. In 2018, he released in one of the most popular songs Thik Hai from the single "Premika Mil Gail". In 2020, he released his third Bollywood song and first Single Ladki Patana produced by Sony Music India.

=== 2021 ===
In 2021, his second Bollywood single Tere Mere Darmiyaan (In between I and You) was released. Yadav collaborated with Bollywood Rapper Badshah in the Bhojpuri version of the famous Hindi song Pani Pani, originally sung by Aastha Gill and Badshah himself. The Bhojpuri version was released under Saregama and Badshah rapped in Bhojpuri language. The song received more than one million views within 60 minutes of being uploaded on YouTube, and became the first Bhojpuri song to do so. He worked with singer and Composer Shipra Goyal in his next Bollywood single Romantic Raja, choreographed by Mudassar Khan and lyrics written by Kunaal Vermaa. His other Hindi single was Tedhi Hai Par Meri Hai and Bhojpuri singles were Ladkiyo Ka Rog Na Paalo, Naya Saal Naya Maal.

=== 2022 ===
Yadav sang the song Do Ghoont which was his first Bhojpuri single of 2022. The song was the remake of the song Do Ghut Mujhe bhi Pila De Sharabi from the 1973 Bollywood film Jheel Ke Us Paar. Soon after he released another single Aashiq (Lover), video of which was shot in Germany. After releasing some Holi songs, he released Dream Me Entry. He sung six songs in his film Aashiqui and released 23 Holi songs. He further released a Chaita song Le Le Aain Coca Cola (transl.: Bring Coca-Cola) which topped the global YouTube music chart. Another Bhojpuri single Nathuniya (The Nose ring) also made it to top 5 in the chart. His first Hindi single of the year, Kamariya Coca Cola released in April 2022 by T-Series.

He sang on Salim–Sulaiman's composition "Tsunami", a Hindi song released in June 2022. In the same month he released one more Hindi single "Unke Dil Me'' (In Her Heart). He further released Bhojpuri single "UP Bihar", followed by a Hindi single "Ya Khuda" (O lord) in August. He further recreated the famous Bengali song "Bondhu Teen Din" (Buddy! Three days) in Bhojpuri. Khesari, then released two Hindi singles; First was "Baarish" (Rain) which released on October 9, 2022, featuring two Armenian models, Par and Seda. The video was also shot in Armenia. The second was "Mehfil" with which he made his debut as a Composer too. He sung a sad Bhojpuri single "Dil Tutal Hoi". In first week of November, his single "Tabla" released. His Nathuniya and Le Le Aain Coca Cola got featured in YouTube annual list of Top Indian songs in 2022.

=== 2023 ===
His song, "Pagale Bana Di Ram Ji" from the film Farishta received good response from the audience and received over 3.6 million views within 24 hours of release. In March, His single "Nagin" released, which got 5.5 million views in the first 24 hours of its release. On 22 April, he released the anthem "Khele Supergiants Lucknowwa" of IPL team Lucknow Super Giants. In September 2025, Delhi High Court restrained Yadav from engaging with any company other than Global Music Junction till September 2025.

== Philanthropy and service ==
Yadav runs an NGO called "Khesari Foundation" which does charitable works across the country. He is the guardian of 62 orphan children and pays for their education. He visits an old age home every month and helps the flood victims of Bihar every year. Before Diwali in 2022, he distributed money to the needy.

== Artistry and criticism ==
Yadav's artistic self is multi-layered, drawing from traditional presentation, contemporary cinematic conventions, and a specific on-screen persona that has been the subject of both popular and academic study.

=== Launda Naach ===
One of the reasons for Yadav's popularity is his background as a Launda Naach performer, a traditional Bhojpuri folk dance in which men play in women's roles. Traditionally related to lower-caste communities, the art form has been considered taboo by upper castes, and its artists have often encountered social shame and had their manhood questioned. Yadav has embraced this part of his career, positioning his success as a revolt against these established preconception. He has mentioned about how established personalities, such as a Brahmin classical music teacher from Buxar, would praise other artists (such as Pawan Singh) but dismiss him as mere a launda (just a male dancer). In a 2013 interview, Yadav took a bold stance on the matter, emphasising his deep connection to his audience and the art form:

I am still doing shows. If I must leave films for them, I will. I belong in the middle of the people. I sing to make them dance. I entertain them. Whatever I am, it is because of them. I cannot even think of being away from them The audience wants to see me in the real look even on the screen. I have also impersonated women in fifteen of my films, and all of them have been hits. I do not like becoming an officer or a rich man. I am not comfortable that way

Academic studies recognise him as a key modern figure in the tradition, alongside historical artists like Bhikhari Thakur and Ramchandra Manjhi, for his role in bringing the dance national and international recognition. He is attributed with infusing the form with a new, peppy vibe by mixing it with modern music and dance styles, which has made it feel new and stimulating to younger audiences. By featuring Launda Naach in his mainstream movies, music videos, and stage shows, Yadav has presented the tradition to a wider audience, helping to keep the art form alive and promoting it as a part of Bihar's regional heritage.

=== Cinematic persona and audience reception ===
His on-screen persona often aligns with a particular Bhojpuri hero standard. An ethnographic study by Rosemary Grennan examining the watching habits of working-class in Old Delhi defined his character in the 2018 film Sangharsh as charming but lacking in responsibility, with the classic star look of a half-open shirt, tight trousers, golden chain and a handlebar moustache. The study notes that his pictures often follow a predictable masala spice mix or thali format, blending heroism, love, and violence. This structure facilitates an interrupted viewing pattern for daily wage labourers, who can leave the cinema for work and return without losing the narrative thread. The same study also documented a specific case of audience reception, observing that during the screening, the male viewers were unimpressed by the female lead's advances but met Yadav's character's rebuttal to her with many cries of approval, indicating how his depiction of masculinity resonates with that demographic.

== Politics ==
In October 2025, Yadav was declared as the Rashtriya Janata Dal candidate from Chapra, Bihar Assembly constituency for the 2025 Bihar Legislative Assembly election. He lost to Chhoti Kumari of Bharatiya Janata Party by over 7,600 votes. After which he suggested that he might step away from politics.

== Filmography ==
Key
†	Denotes films that have not yet been released

Films

Year	Film	Role	Director	Notes
2011	Sajan Chale Sasural	Sajan		
2012	Jaan Tere Naam			
2012	Dil Le Gayi Odhaniya Wali	Khesari Lal Yadav		
2012	Devra Par Manva Dole			
2012	Nagin			
2012	Lahoo Ke Do Rang			
2013	Hawa Mein Udta Jaye Mera Lal Dupatta Malmal Ka			
2013	Sapoot			
2013	Doodh Ka Karz			
2013	Pyar Jhukta Nahi	Kishan		
2013	Pyar Kawno Khel Na Ha			
2013	Ae Balma Biharwala			
2013	Sansaar			
2013	Teri Kasam			
2013	Kachche Dhaage	Gopal		
2013	Chhapra Express			
2014	Betaab			
2014	Pratigya 2			
2014	Shola Shabnam			
2014	Charno Ki Saugandh			
2014	Tere Naam			
2014	Jaaneman	Prem		
2014	Khoon Bhari Maang			
2014	Lahoo Pukarela			
2014	Jo Jita Wahi Sikander			
2014	Hathkadi			
2014	Laadla	Khesari		
2015	Latkhor			
2015	Saathiya			
2015	Tu Mera Hero			
2015	Bandhan	Suraj		
2015	Haseena Maan Jayegi			
2015	Inteqaam	Aftab		
2015	Jaanam			
2015	Hero No.1			
2015	Khesari Ke Prem Rog	Khesari		
2016	Jwala	Deepak/Jwala		
2016	Sajan Chale Sasural 2	Sajan		
2016	Dilwala	Kishan		
2016	Global Baba			Hindi film; cameo
2016	Dabang Aashiq			
2016	Khiladi	Khesari		
2016	Hogi Pyar Ki Jeet	Suraj		
2017	Mehandi Laga Ke Rakhna	Raja		
2017	Aatankwadi	Armaan		
2017	Jila Champaran			
2017	Hum Hai Hindustani	Ram Hindustani		
2017	Mai Sehra Bandh Ke Aaunga	Raja		
2017	Muqaddar	Khesari Lal Yadav		
2017	Kasam Paida Karne Wale Ki	Cameo		
2018	Deewanapan	Raja		
2018	Damru	Bhola		
2018	Rajajani	Raja		
2018	Dulhan Ganga Paar Ke	Krishna		
2018	Sangharsh	Kanhaiya		
2018	Balam Ji Love You	Raju		
2018	Naagdev	Naagdev/ Dev		
2018	Dabang Sarkar	Veer Pratap Singh		
2019	Coolie No. 1	Raja		
2019	Baaghi- Ek Yoddha			
2019	Bhag Khesari Bhag	Khesari subham		
2019	Meri Jung Mera Faisla	Kishan		
2020	Ek Saazish Jaal			
2020	Mehandi Laga Ke Rakhna 3	Raja		
2021	Dulhan Wahi Jo Piya Man Bhaye	Raja		
2021	Saiyan Arab Gaile Na			
2021	Chori Chori Chupke Chupke			
2021	Baap Ji	Raja		
2021	Litti Chokha	Chhokha		
2021	Pyar Kiya To Nibhana			
2022	Aashiqui	Raja		
2022	Shadi Ho To Aisi			
2022	Dulhaniya London Se Layenge	Raja		
2022	Rowdy Inspector	Inspector Suraj		
2022	Doli Saja Ke Rakhna	Raja		
2022	Bol Radha Bol	Kisan		
2022	Raja Ki Aayegi Baraat	Raja		
2023	Farishta	Murari		
2023	Mere Naina Tere Naina†			Awadhi film
2023	Laadla 2			
2023	Sangharsh 2	Dharam Raj		
2024	Prem Ki Pujaran			
2024	Aparadhi	Raja		
2024	Rang De Basanti †			
2024	Andaaz			
2025	Rishtey			
2025	Duns	Jatadhar	Dhiraj Thakur	
2025	Shree 420			To be released
TBA	Rajaram†	TBA		
TBA	Meharbaan †	TBA		Filming
TBA	Godfather†	TBA		Filming
TBA	Son Of Bihar†	TBA		Filming
TBA	Vaastav†	TBA		Post Production
TBA	Awaidh			Trailer out

=== Story/screenwriter ===
- Aashiqui - 2022

=== Television ===
Year	Title	Role	Notes
2016	Yaaron Ki Baraat	As Himself	Episode 3, with Sania Mirza and Parineeti Chopra
2019	Bigg Boss 13	Contestant	Entered day 36, exited day 55

=== Haryanvi ===
==== Music videos ====
Year	Title	Singer(s)	Ref.
2022	"Matak Matak"	Vishwajeet Chaudhary	
2023	"Balam"	Devender Ahlawat, Komal Chaudhary	

== Awards ==
Year	Award	Category	Work	Result	Ref.
2019	Bhojpuri Cine Awards	Best Actor (Male)	Sangharsh	Won	
2019	Sabrang Film Awards	Best Actor (Male)	Sangharsh	Won	
2018	Sabrang Film Awards	Best Actor (Male)	Mehandi Laga Ke Rakhna	Won	
2018	Sabrang Film Awards	Most Popular Actor		Won	
2018	Bhojpuri Cine Awards	Best Actor	Mehandi Laga Ke Rakhna	Won	
2016	Bhojpuri Cine Awards	Most Popular Actor		Won	

== See also ==
- Nilkamal Singh
