= Kajal Raghwani =

Indian actress

- Born: Pune, Maharastra
- Occupation: Actress
- Years active: 2011–present

Kajal Raghwani is an Indian actress. She has worked in Bhojpuri films like Pratigya 2, Hukumat, Patna Se Pakistan, Muqaddar, Mehandi Laga Ke Rakhna and Mai Sehra Bandh Ke Aaunga. Raghwani is considered as one of the highest paid Bhojpuri actress.

== Filmography ==
=== Films ===
Key
†	Denotes films that have not yet been released

Year	Film	Role	Language	Notes
2009	Have Mare Hira Nathi Ghasva		Gujarati	
2011	Sugna		Bhojpuri	
2013	Rihai		Bhojpuri	
2014	Pratigya 2		Bhojpuri	
2014	Devra Bhail Deewana		Bhojpuri	
2015	Patna Se Pakistan	Komal	Bhojpuri	
2015	Hukumat		Bhojpuri	
2015	Baj Gail Danka		Bhojpuri	
2016	Bhojpuriya Raja		Bhojpuri	
2016	Jaaneman		Bhojpuri	
2016	Inteqaam	Sweta	Bhojpuri	
2016	Aashik Aawara		Bhojpuri	
2016	Dabang Aashiq		Bhojpuri	
2016	Lagi Tohse lagan		Bhojpuri	
2017	Jai Mehraru Jai Sasurari		Bhojpuri	
2017	Majaz: Ae Gham-e-Dil Kya Karun		Hindi, Urdu	
2017	Tere Jaisa Yaar Kahan		Bhojpuri	
2017	Ham Hain Hindustani		Bhojpuri	
2017	Sarkar Raj	Cameo	Bhojpuri	
2017	Mehandi Laga Ke Rakhna	Kajal	Bhojpuri	
2017	Pyar Ke Rang Hazaar		Bhojpuri	
2017	Mai Sehra Bandh Ke Aaunga	Pooja	Bhojpuri	
2018	Muqaddar	Herself	Bhojpuri	
2018	Deewanapan	Herself	Bhojpuri	
2018	Dulhan Ganga Paar Ke	Radha	Bhojpuri	
2018	Bairi Kangana 2	Chanda	Bhojpuri	
2018	Sangharsh	Rukhmani	Bhojpuri	
2018	Balam Ji Love You	Meera	Bhojpuri	
2018	Naagdev	Nageena/ Shivani	Bhojpuri	
2018	Dabang Sarkar	Cameo	Bhojpuri	
2019	Maine Unko Sajan Chun Liya	Sona	Bhojpuri	
2019	Coolie No. 1	Rani	Bhojpuri	
2019	Vivah	Cameo	Bhojpuri	
2019	Baaghi- Ek Yoddha		Bhojpuri	
2019	Kashi Vishwanath		Bhojpuri	
2021	Dulhan Wahi Jo Piya Man Bhaye	Diya	Bhojpuri	
2021	Litti Chokha		Bhojpuri	
2025	Mere Husband Ki Shadi Hai		Bhojpuri	

=== Television ===
Year	Show	Role	Language	Note	Ref
2026	Bhojpuri Bawaal	Herself	Hindi		
2026	Rise and Fall 2	Contestant	Hindi	12th place	

== Media image ==
Raghwani is considered in the media as one of the highest paid Bhojpuri actress. She is also one of the most followed Bhojpuri actress on Instagram with over 5.4 million followers.

== Awards ==
Raghwani received the Bhojpuri Best Actress People's Choice Award in 2016 at the International Bhojpuri Film Awards (IBFA) held in Dubai.

== See also ==
- List of Bhojpuri actresses
