= March 22 (film) =

- Theatrical release poster
- Directed by: Kodlu Ramakrishna
- Written by: Kodlu Ramakrishna
- Screenplay by: Madhu B. A.
- Story by: Kodlu Ramakrishna
- Produced by: Harish Sherigar; Sharmila Sherigar
- Starring: Aryavardhan; Kiran Raj; Meghashree; Deepthi Shetty
- Cinematography: Mohan M. M.
- Edited by: Basavaraj Uras
- Music by: N. J Ravishekar Mayavi; Manikanth Kadri
- Production company: Acme Movies International
- Release date: 25 August 2017
- Country: India
- Language: Kannada

March 22 (World Water Day) is a 2017 Indian epic periodical Kannada-language film directed by Kodlu RamaKrishna and produced by NRI entrepreneur, managing director of Acme building materials Inc LLC, Dubai and singer Harish Sherigar under the banner of Acme Movies International. It stars Arya Vardan, Kiran Raj, Meghashree, and Deepthi Shetty in the lead roles and Anant Nag in a supporting role. The film's music was created by N. J Ravishekar Mayavi and Manikanth Kadri, dialogue by Madhu B.A, cinematography by Mohan M.M, editing by Basavaraj Uras, and choreography by Madan Harini.

The movie carries a message regarding unity, living in communal harmony, and the awful use of religion by some people due to their "ego."

== Cast ==
- Aryavardhan as Salman
- Kiran Raj as Rahul
- Meghashree as Amrutha
- Deepthi Shetty as Rukshana
- Anant Nag as geologist
- Geetha
- Ashish Vidyarthi
- Sharath Lohitashwa as Basavanagowda Patil, a legislator
- Ravi Kale as Chikkmath
- Jai Jagadish as Sanganna
- Vinaya Prasad as Mumtaj
- Padmaja Rao as Ramakka
- Sadhu Kokila as geologist
- YuvaKishor as Siddarth
- Srijan Rai
- Shantha Acharya as Parvathi
- Prashobitha Prabhakar as Rahul's sister
- Chidanand Poojary
- Suvarna Sathish Poojary as Shailaja
- Srinivasa Murthy as Mathadheeswara
- Ramesh Bhat
- Ravindranath
- Harish Sherigar as Chief Minister
- Sharmila Sherigar as minister

== Soundtrack ==
N. J Ravishekar Rajamaga & Manikanth Kadri has composed the score and original soundtrack for the film. It was released by ZEE Music Co.

- "Ganesha Song"
- "Water Song"
- "Duet Song 1"
- "Duet Song 2"
- "Pathos Song"

== Reception ==
A critic from The News Minute wrote that "If you’re tired of the usual masala film that lurches between fights, punch dialogues and romantic songs and item numbers, you might find March 22 worth a watch." A critic from The Times of India rated the film three out of five stars.
