= Tanvi Kishore =

Indian actress

Tanvi Parab
- Born: Tanvi Kishore Parab; 24 July; Bahrain
- Citizenship: India
- Occupations: Actress; model
- Years active: 2010–present
- Website: Tanvee Kishore

Tanvi Kishore Parab (born 24 July) is an Indian actress and model, who works predominantly in Marathi, Hindi and Konkani cinemas. She marked her debut in 2011 with Raada Rox and is notable for her performance in Sagar Ballary's debut Marathi movie Bhatukali

== Early life and education ==
Tanvi Kishore was born to Kishore Parab and Ketki Parab in Bahrain. From the age of four, Kishore did print shoots for local brands in the UAE. She did her schooling in Dubai and decided to shift to India for her further education, her junior college being Fergusson College in Pune. Her exotic looks and striking personality comes from being Dubai-raised and a multi-linguist with her knowledge and ability to speak 11 languages.

== Career ==
While she was pursuing her business studies in Pune, she became the youth icon of Pune at a prestigious intercollege competition, which bagged her several ad campaigns, one of them being PassPass. Her cousin recommended her name to a friend for the lead girl's casting of Raada Rox, while still in college. Kishore made her debut with Raada Rox and was spotted by Balaji Telefilms' casting director for the role of an NRI girl, in their first Marathi daily soap. She says getting into the film industry was a pure accident. After doing Marathi and Hindi films, Kishore did her first Konkani cinema O La La, where she is the leading lady alongside veterans of the Goan industry. Having learnt 11 languages including Hindi, Marathi, English, German, Arabic, Urdu, Konkani, Kishore expresses her interest in doing films in different languages.

== Filmography ==
=== Movies ===
Year	Title	Role	Language
2011	Raada Rox	Anuya	Marathi
2012	Preet Tujhi Majhi	Priya	Marathi
2014	Bhatukali	Bhargavi Deshmukh	Marathi
2014	Bikers Adda	Roshani	Marathi
2015	Kuku Mathur Ki Jhand Ho Gayi	Sunaina	Hindi
2015	Viraat Veer Maratha	Ranee	Marathi
2015	Galbat	Ruhi	Marathi
2018	O La La	Ruby	Konkani
2018	Ti geli tevha	Priya	Marathi
2019	Safe	Falguni Mahadevan	Malayalam
2020	Vijeta	Sonia Karnik	Marathi
2021	Salmon 3D		Tamil
2023	Gumraah	Murder Victim's Sister	Hindi

=== TV serials ===
Year	Title	Role
2010	Maziya Priyala Preet Kalena	Namrata
2016	Shakti – Astitva Ke Ehsaas Ki	Sweety
2020	Suvasini	Sharmila

=== Web series ===
Year	Title	Role	Notes
2020	Happily Ever After	Zainab	
2021	Bang Baang		ZEE5
