= Muddy (film) =

2021 Indian Malayalam film

- Film Poster
- Directed by: Dr. Pragabhal
- Produced by: Prema Krishnadas
- Starring: Yuvan Krishna; Ridhaan Krishna; Renji Panicker
- Cinematography: K G Ratheesh
- Edited by: San Lokesh
- Music by: Ravi Basrur
- Production company: PK7 Creations
- Release date: 10 December 2021
- Country: India
- Language: Malayalam

Muddy is a 2021 Indian Malayalam-language sports action drama film directed by Dr. Pragabhal, under the banner of PK7 Creations. It is the first Indian movie based on off-road mud race (4×4), which stars Yuvan Krishna, Ridhaan Krishna, Anusha Suresh and Amit Sivadas Nair in the lead roles, while Hareesh Peradi, IM Vijayan, and Renji Panicker play supporting roles in the film. Muddy was released in five languages (Tamil, Telugu, Kannada, Hindi and English) in theatres on 10 December 2021.

== Synopsis ==
Muddy, a family and revenge drama, has three mud races with "one of a kind" modified 4x4s used by the main characters.

== Cast ==
- Yuvan Krishna as Muthu aka Chathrapathi
- Ridhaan Krishnas as Karthy
- Suresh Anusha
- Renji Panicker as Noah
- Hareesh Peradi as Sait
- I.M. Vijayan as Shaiju
- Amit Sivadas Nair
- Hhary Jo
- Sunil Sukhada
- Manoj Guinness
- Shobha Mohan as Muthu's mother
- Kottayam Ramesh as Muthu's grandfather
- Abhishek Sreekumar as Young Muthu
- Ajith Koshy
- Roshan Chandra
- Bineesh Bastin as Noah's Henchman
- Abu Valayamkulam
- Molly Kannamaly
- Sivadas Mattannur
- Harish Pengan as Tea shop Owner

== Production ==
=== Development ===
Pragabhal Das has been into the idea of off-road racing since 2015. He developed the script against the backdrop of mud racing, with revenge worked in the spine. The film is bankrolled by Prema Krishnadas under the banner of PK7 Creations. The film was announced by Tamil star Vijay Sethupati, that the first Indian off-road racing film, by releasing the motion poster of the film on 20 February 2021. As the film releasing its versions in other languages such as Tamil, Kannada, Telugu, Hindi and English, artists from each industries such as Arjun Kapoor, Fahadh Faasil, Unni Mukundan, Anil Ravipudi and Shiva Rajkumar, introduced the film teasers in each languages through their social media handles.

Pragabhal and his team spent five years on the production of Muddy, with the principal actors engaged for a period of two years in real-time training in mud racing and executing risky stunts without dupe artists.

=== Casting ===
Muddy features new artists Yuvan, Ridhaan Krishna and Anusha Suresh along with renowned Malayalam actors Renji Panicker, Hareesh Peradi, football legend I. M Vijayan, Guinness Manoj, and Bineesh Bastin. On the technical front, KG Ratheesh is the cinematographer. San Lokesh, who is known for the film Ratsasan, is the editor. Ravi Basrur is composing music for the film who is known for his music in the film KGF: Chapter 1. Cinematography was handled by KG Ratheesh and Ranga is the colorist.

=== Shooting ===
As the concept of mud racing being new to the Indian cinema and its audiences, making it real was a challenging task, also the production process was not that all easy. Mud racing and stunts shots in the mud were filmed realistically without any assistance of computer technology. The film was shot in the border of Kerala-Tamil Nadu states and places in Kerala such as Idukki and Kattappana.

== Release ==
Due to the impact of COVID-19 pandemic, as a security measure the Government of Kerala imposed a shut down of movie theatres. After almost an year of this shut down, the theatres in Kerala are allowed to reopen by 25 October 2021. Dr. Pragabhal refused the offer to release the film in OTT as the film was completed for a theatre experience. The visual and sound effects of the film could only be experienced in cinemas and the film was released in the big screen on 10 December 2021 in six languages.
