= Nandini (TV series) =

Indian supernatural television series

- Poster
- Genre: Supernatural; Fantasy; Horror
- Story by: Sundar C
- Directed by: Raj Kapoor
- Starring: Nithya Ram; Khushbu; Rahul Ravi; Malavika Wales; Gayatri Jayaraman; Adhitri Guruvayurappan; Vijayakumar; Riyaz Khan; Rekha Krishnappa
- Theme music composer: Hiphop Tamizha
- Opening theme: "Yaaradhu Yaaradhu" Karishma Ravichandran(Vocals)
- Composer: Dhina
- Country of origin: India
- Original languages: Season:1; Tamil; Kannada; Season: 2 Kannada
- No. of seasons: 2
- No. of episodes: 977

Production
- Producers: Season:1; Sundar C Kushboo Sundar; Season: 2 Ramesh Aravind
- Cinematography: Season: 1 U. K. Senthil Kumar
- Editors: N.B.Srikanth, C.M Selva Kumar, Sutheef S
- Production companies: Season: 1 Avni Telemedia; Sun Pictures; Season: 2 Ramesh Aravind Productions

Original release
- Network: Sun TV; Udaya TV
- Release: 23 January 2017 – 31 July 2020

Related
- Jothi

Nandini is an Indian Tamil-Kannada bilingual supernatural fantasy thriller drama series that aired on Sun TV and Udaya TV. This series is considered the most expensive TV serial of all time in South India due to its grand cinematic scale, elaborate visual effects, high production values and its simultaneous launch in multiple South Indian languages.

The first season of Nandini started in the Tamil and Kannada languages. It aired from 23 January 2017 to 22 December 2018 on Sun TV and from 23 January 2017 to 22 February 2019 on Udaya TV, both for 589 episodes. It was produced by Sundar C under Avni Telemedia. The season starred Nithya Ram in a dual role as Ganga and the titular character Nandini, along with an ensemble supporting cast which includes Khushbu, Rahul Ravi, Malavika Wales, Gayatri Jayaraman, Adhitri Guruvayurappan, Vijayakumar, Riyaz Khan, Rekha Krishnappa and others.

The second season of Nandini started only in the Kannada language on Udaya TV from 25 February 2019 to 31 July 2020 for 381 episodes. It was produced by Ramesh Aravind Productions and served as a sequel to its previous phase. This season starred Nithya Ram, Chaya Singh, Vinay Gowda, Kavya Shastry, Rashmi, Bharath, Jayashree, Rekha Krishnappa and others.

A spin-off of Nandini titled as Jothi aired from 29 May to 1 August 2021 in Tamil language on Sun TV for 13 episodes. It starred Meghashree, Chandana Shetty and Vishnu Unnikrishnan.

In 2026, a sequel series titled RajNandini premiered in Hindi on Sun Neo. It serves as a direct continuation of the first season of Nandini and follows a separate continuity from the Kannada-language second season, which aired on Udaya TV. It stars Neha Solanki in the titular character Raj Nandini, alongside Nithya Ram and Rahul Ravi.

== Series overview ==
Series	Languages	Episodes	Originally released	
Series	Languages	Episodes	First released	Last released
Nandini	Tamil; Kannada	589	23 January 2017	22 December 2018; 22 February 2019
Nandini 2 (Note: Refers to the Kannada version of Season 2)	Kannada	381	25 February 2019	31 July 2020
Jothi (Note: Refers to the spin-off series titled Jothi)	Tamil	13	29 May 2021	1 August 2021

== Plot ==
=== Season 1 (In Chronological order) ===
In the early 90s, a wealthy man named Rathnavel Boopathy falls in love with an enigmatic shape-shifting serpent named Parvathy, and the two get married. They move to a distant village to escape from Parvathy's evil clan, who are against her marriage. Parvathy gives birth to twin daughters—Nandini and Ganga. Ganga acquires human qualities, whereas Nandini inherits snake traits.

To protect Rathnavel from her clan’s murderous intentions, Parvathy transforms him into a transgender person and lets him escape with one of the daughters, Ganga. She escapes with the other daughter, Nandini. Subsequently, Rathnavel loses all memory and hands Ganga over to a royal housemaid named Manickam. Manickam, who is childless, raises Ganga as his own daughter in the palace where he works. Rathnavel takes on a female name "Seiyanayagi", and continues his devotion to the deity Karuppar.

Parvathy seeks shelter in an abandoned temple of Kaatu Amman in the forest, where she regains her powers as "Shiva Naagam" through the influence of the three Kala Chakras—a set of sacred spiritual objects present in the temple. From then on, Parvathy takes up the responsibility of protecting the Kala Chakras. Meanwhile, Nandini is destined to remain in serpent form until she turns 26, at which point she will attain a human form and the status of "Shakthi Naagam."

6 years later

Parvathy and Nandini live peacefully as devotees of Kaatu Amman, along with the temple priest Muniappa and his family. A rich businessman named Rajashekar and his five friends(a magician named Namboothiri, three business partners- Kumar, Vichu, Rajesh, and Namboothiri’s sister Madhavi) arrive to steal the three Kala Chakras protected by Parvathy—for personal gain.

One day, Rajashekar and his friends deceive Parvathy and Muniappa’s family, murder Parvathy and steal the three Kala Chakras. Nandhini comes to rescue Gayathri (Muniyappa's daughter) from one of the murderers Rajesh, and kills him. Gayathri asks Nandhini to go to the temple. Gayathri was then taken by the village people. When Nandini reaches the temple, she witnesses a dying Parvathy who asks Nandini to avenge her by killing every murderer along with their families and reclaiming the stolen Kala Chakras and then she dies. Nandhini goes fiercely to avenge all the 5 but with the 3 kaal chakras power, she faints down and gets captured by the murderers.

The Kala Chakras only have power as long as Nandini is alive. So, they decide to trap Nandini at Rajashekar’s palace, where her twin sister Ganga lives. Namboothiri traps Nandini in a snake pit with magical protection, rendering her immobile. She is sealed in the snake pit with a magical law stating that "Nandini can never break free until the blood of her true devotee falls on her skin".

14 years later

Arun Rajashekar, the son of Rajashekar, falls in love with a village girl named Janaki and marries her. Kavitha, Janaki’s friend who also loved Arun, commits suicide after the marriage. Her sister Bhairavi, a powerful magician, vows revenge. She kills Janaki’s father and sets out to destroy Arun’s family.

Soon after, Arun moves to Malaysia, leaving his pregnant wife Janaki behind at the palace. During this time, Janaki bonds well with the grown-up Ganga, who works as a maid in the palace. Months later, she gives birth to a child, but the baby is secretly swapped with a dead child, making everyone believe that Janaki's child died. Dharmaraj—Arun's uncle—kills Janaki with the help of his son Moorthy and their friend Balaji, hoping his own daughter Maya can marry Arun. Arun is devastated after Janaki's death and goes into depression. Janaki returns as a spirit to bring back her child and protect her family.

6 years later

Ganga has unknowingly performed daily poojas at the snake pit for the past 20 years and becomes a devotee of the snake inside, unaware the snake is her own sister who is trapped within. Janaki’s spirit tries to give magical clues to Arun and succeeds in bringing back her real daughter, Devasena to the palace, who had been swapped at birth.

Arun agrees to remarry for the sake of his daughter Devasena. Meanwhile, Rajashekar’s wicked sisters Devi and Manju, along with Janaki’s murderer Dharmaraj, compete to get their daughters married to Arun. However, Janaki’s spirit thwarts all their plans and kills Balaji, one of her murderers. Eventually, Ganga agrees to marry Arun at Rajashekar’s request and promises to raise Devasena with love. Meanwhile, Janaki continues protecting Arun from Bhairavi’s attacks. The night before her wedding, Ganga’s blood accidentally spills into the snake pit during pooja, breaking the 20-year magical protection around Nandini. Nandini enters Ganga’s body to avenge her mother’s death. After Ganga marries Arun, she begins her quest for revenge. Nandini plans to kill Arun and Devasena to make Rajashekar suffer but is stopped by Janaki’s spirit. Nandini successfully kills Kumar, one of the murderers of Parvathy, but fails to attain the Kala Chakras.

The battle between Janaki’s spirit and Nandini escalates—one fighting to protect the family, the other seeking its destruction. Nandini leaves Ganga’s body to avoid detection. Ganga, taking responsibility for Kumar’s death, surrenders and is imprisoned to prevent Nandini’s return. Namboothiri, however, sees through this and ensures Ganga is released. Ganga starts despising Nandini without knowing the true story behind Nandini's revenge. Meanwhile, Bhairavi seeks the Kala Chakras after knowing about its true powers. An evil witch named Saamundi, also seeks the Kala Chakras for gaining power. Multiple battles occur amongst various people for getting the ownership of the Kala Chakras. Janaki's lookalike named Seetha arrives into Ganga's life, unknowingly creating conflicts between her and Arun. Ganga leaves the house due to misunderstandings and ends up learning about Nandini’s true story. Ganga confronts Rajashekar and begs for the Kala Chakras. But he tricks her and tries to kill her, but Seiyanayagi rescues her and treats her in secret.

On the night of a full moon, on her 26th birthday, Nandini attains a female form identical to Ganga. But no one knows the true form of Nandini's appearance. Meanwhile, Rajashekar is scared that his son will discover Ganga's murder and commands Bhairavi to disguise herself as Ganga and return to the palace to obtain the Kala Chakras. Nandini makes use of this chance and captures Bhairavi, kills Namboothiri and enters the palace posing as Ganga to search for the Kala Chakras. Madhavi, the final murderer of Parvathy, emerges from her long penance to try and kill Nandini. Rajashekar, sensing danger, pleads for forgiveness when Ganga returns. It soon becomes clear that Nandini and Ganga look identical.

A few days later, Nandini kills two other murderers- Vichu and Rajashekar, which causes Ganga to misunderstand her. Bhairavi, now reformed, forgives Arun and assists Nandini in her quest for the Kala Chakras. Meanwhile, Janaki kills Dharmaraj and Saamundi to protect her family. Madhavi seeks the assist of Janaki's spirit to help her kill Nandini. Janaki agrees to protect her family from Nandini. Ganga initially tries to kill Nandini but eventually learns from Seiyanayagi that they are sisters. The two join forces, but fate separates them once again when Madhavi gains possession of all three Kala Chakras and resurrects Namboothiri.

The entire family now realize the evil intentions of Madhavi and Namboothiri. Together, Madhavi and Namboothiri trap Nandini in the Kaatu Amman temple. Their plan is thwarted when Ganga gives Nandini the three Kala Chakras. With Janaki’s spirit helping her, Nandini kills both Namboothiri and Madhavi. Contrary to Parvathy’s dying wish that the entire Rajashekar family be destroyed, Nandini chooses to spare the remaining members and turns herself into a stone serpent as penance. Ganga is heartbroken by their separation, but Nandini promises to visit her once every year. Ganga later becomes pregnant, and the family begins a new, peaceful life. Though separated, the bond between Nandini and Ganga remains unbreakable. The final episode focuses on their enduring sisterhood.

=== Season 2 (Kannada version) ===
After all the problems are over, Arun and his family live in peace, but after sending Ganga to the temple for some puja purposes, the palace collapses and Arun dies. He is the son of Namboothiri and the reason is that he has come to ask for revenge for killing his father. His name is Akshtavakra. Ganga also dies during childbirth. Then the priest raises her child. After the child grows up, Devasena, who lives in Bangalore, finds her and brings her back. But Sharbha and Ashtavakra, who came to get the Kalachakra, try to harm Janani. So Janani realizes that she is an Arthasivanagam. At the same time, Janani also falls in love with a young man named Virat. Janani, realizing that her goal is something else, leaves him. Ram and Shabad, who came to get the Kalachakra, kill Janani. So Janani turns into a stone and goes to Nandini. But it shows that Janani's life is not complete. Later, Devasena realizes that Arun had not only one daughter but two children. Janani and Nandini are sisters. Nandini returns. Janani's soul enters Nandini's body and takes revenge. Trishala is the daughter born to Ganga when she lived as a snake in her previous life in the Naga world. She also comes to help Janani, but Madhavi returns in the form of a serpent to fight them. After Janani destroys everyone, Nandini leaves her body and goes outside. Everyone dedicates the Kalachakra to the goddess, Trishalaya becomes the queen of Nagalok, and Nandini decides to live her family life with Virat and enjoy the rest of her life.

=== RaajNanndini ===
The plot starts right from the end of season 1. This series focuses on Arun and Ganga's daughter Raaj Nandini, whose life changes when destiny calls her back to the place, where she was kept away from.

== Cast and characters ==
=== Season 1 ===
==== Main ====
- Nithya Ram in a dual role as:
  - Nandini: a Shakti Naagam, a shape-shifting serpent who exacts vengeance on the assassins who murdered her mother; Rathnavel and Parvathy's elder daughter, Ganga's twin sister.
  - Ganga Arun: the human component, Rathnavel and Parvathy's younger daughter, Nandini's twin sister, Arun's second wife, Devasena's stepmother.
    - Baby Ahana as Young Ganga
- Khushbu as Parvathy Rathnavel: a Shiva Naagam, the shape-shifting serpent, Rathnavel's wife, Nandini and Ganga's mother (Extended Cameo; Dead)
- Rahul Ravi as Arun Rajasekhar: Rajasekhar's son.
- Malavika Wales in a dual role as:
  - Janaki Arun: Arun's first wife. (Dead)
  - Seetha: the human element, Janaki's medium look alike, Ganga and Arun's well-wisher.
- Adhithri Guruvayurappan as Devasena: Janaki and Arun's daughter, Rajasekhar's granddaughter, Ganga's step-daughter.

==== Recurring ====
- Gayatri Jayaraman as Bhairavi: A Yogini, she was a magician who sought revenge against Arun and helped Nandhini in finding the Kaal Chakras.
- Vijayakumar as Rajashekar: Father of Arun and Malathy. He was one of the murderers who seeks "Kaal Chakra", and killed Parvathy and then killed by Nandhini.
- Riyaz Khan as Rathnavel Bhoopathi alias Seiya Nayagi: a transgender who worships the deity Karuppan; Ganga and Nandini's father and Paravathy's husband.
- Rekha Krishnappa as Madhavi: A Shiva Thapasvini; She was one of the murderers who seeks "Kaal Chakra", and killed Parvathy and then killed by Nandhini.
  - Vanishree as young Madhavi
- Sachu as Annapoorani: Rajasekhar's elder sister, Arun's aunt
- Narasimha Raju as Muniappan: Parvathy's henchman, Nandini's guardian and Gayatri's father, killed by Madhavi.
- Vinod as Krishna Tamburan alias Namboothiri: A priest, He was one of the murderers who seeks "Kaal Chakra", and killed Parvathy and then killed by Nandhini; Madhavi's brother
- Shreya Anchan as Gayatri alias Sandhya Manimegalai: Muniappan and Lakshmi's daughter, Nandhini and Ganga's cousin sister who attempts a revenge against the murderers who killed Parvathy, then killed by Naagananthian
  - Yuvina Parthavi as Young Gayatri
- Vijayalakshmi / Kanya Bharathi as Devi: Annapoorani and Rajasekhar's first younger sister, Arun's aunt; Eshwaran's wife and Shanthi's mother
- Meena Vemuri as Leela: Annapoorani and Rajasekhar's second younger sister, Arun's aunt; Dharmaraj's wife, Moorthy and Maya's mother
- Keerthi Jai Dhanush as Maya: Leela and Dharmaraj's daughter, Moorthy's Sister and Arun's cousin
- Padmini Jagadeesh as Manju, Annapoorani and Rajasekhar's third younger sister, Arun's aunt and Kumar's wife
- Kavitha as Selva Rani: Rajasekhar's second wife, Arun's step mother
- Swetha as Malathi: Rajasekhar and Selva Rani's daughter, Arun's younger sister and Moorthy's wife
- K. S. G. Venkatesh as Maanikam: Rajasekhar's henchman, Ganga's adoptive father
- Ramesh Pandit as Dharmaraj: Leela's husband, Moorthy and Maya's father
- Kiran as Moorthy: Leela and Dharmaraj's son, Maya's brother, Arun's cousin, Gayatri's ex-fiancé and Malathi's husband
- Sri Ganesh as Eshwaran: Devi's husband and Shanthi's father
- Bhanuprakash as Kumar: Manju's husband
- Manjula Paritala as Shanthi: Devi and Eshwaran's daughter
- Shabnam as Ramya: Manju and Kumar's daughter, Arun's ex-fiancé
- Shanmugarajan / Mahanadi Shankar as Sathyanarayanan: Selva Rani's younger brother
- Rani as Mallika: Sathyanarayanan's wife
- Vijaya Durga as Chamundi: Witch who seeks "Kaal Chakra", killed by Janaki
- Vichu Vishwanath as Vichu: He was one of the murderers who seeks "Kaal Chakra", and killed Parvathy and then killed by Nandhini; Rajasekhar's business partner
- Girish as Kumar: He was one of the murderers who seeks "Kaal Chakra", killed Parvathy and then killed by Nandhini
- Gracey as Lakshmi: Muniappa's wife and Gayatri's mother
- Deepa Nethran as Raadha: Gayatri's adoptive mother
- Mohammed Mastan Naga as Naganandiyan: Parvathy's elder brother, shape shifting serpent
- Ramesh Kannan as Nagavanchiyan
- Rudrachand as Shenbagachezhiyan
- V.S.Jayanthi as Chellamma
- Nanditha Ghosh as Kavitha: Bhairavi's younger sister
- Kousalya Senthamarai as Ranganayaki
- Kalairani as Naachiyaaramma: magician
- Niranjan BS as Suresh: Ramya's lover
- Anu Mohan as Neelakanthan
- Thameem Ansari as Balaji: Arun's friend
- Sivakumar as Dr. Siva
- Swarna Ramakrishnan as Meenakshi
- Ram Rajesh as an Icchadhari Snake
- Baba Lakshman as Janaki's father, killed by Bhairavi

==== Special appearances ====
- Manjula Vijayakumar as Manjula: Rajasekhar's first wife and Arun's mother (posthumous photographic appearance only)
- Singampuli as a villager
- Vaiyapuri as a snake charmer
- Sudha Raghunathan as herself

=== Season 2 ===
- Nithya Ram in a triple role as:
  - Janani Viraat: A human element but has a snake powers; Arun and Ganga's elder daughter; Nandini Jr's estranged sister, Devasena's half sister; Viraat's wife (Dead)
    - Baby Lisha as Young Janani
  - Nandini: Shakti Naagam, Rathnavel and Parvathy's oldest daughter, Muniappan's adopted daughter, Ganga's twin sister, Trishala's motherly figure; Janani, Nandini Jr's aunt and a shape-shifting serpent (Cameo)
  - Ganga Arun: the human component, Rathnavel and Parvathy's younger daughter, Nandhini's twin sister; Arun's second wife, Rajasekhar's daughter-in-law, Devasena's stepmother, Janani and Nandini Jr's mother (Extended cameo)
- Chaya Singh as Nandini Jr - Nandini's reincarnation; Ganga and Arun's younger daughter, Janani's estranged sister, a human element but has a snake powers; Viraat's second wife
- Vinay Gowda as Viraat
- Kavya Shastry as Devasena - Arun and Janaki's daughter; Ganga's stepdaughter and Janani, Nandini Jr's half sister
  - Adhithri Guruvayurappan as Young Devasena (Extended cameo)
- Rashmi as Neeli: An over attitude girl who one-sidedly loved Viraat
- Bharath as Ashtavakra
- Jayashree as Sharabha
- Anu Poovamma as Trishala: Nandini Sr's foster daughter
- Rekha Krishnappa as Madhavi
- Riyaz Khan as Rathnavel Bhoopathi alias Seiya Nayagi (Cameo)
- Rahul Ravi as Arun Rajasekhar (Cameo)
- Ramesh Aravind as a Narrator

== Production ==
=== Development ===
Nandini was conceived and developed with the intention of bringing a cinematic experience to the small screen. The initial concept for the series was envisioned by Sundar C, who also took on the role of producer for the first season alongside Khushbu Sundar under their banner, Avni Telemedia. Raj Kapoor helmed the directorial duties, ensuring a consistent vision across the ambitious bilingual production. The series was unique in its simultaneous filming in Tamil and Kannada, with scenes often re-shot for both languages to cater to their respective audiences on Sun TV and Udaya TV. Its success led to dubbing in Telugu for Gemini TV and Malayalam for Surya TV, further expanding its reach across South India. The show's commitment to high production values and elaborate visual effects was a cornerstone of its development, setting it apart from typical television dramas.

=== Casting ===
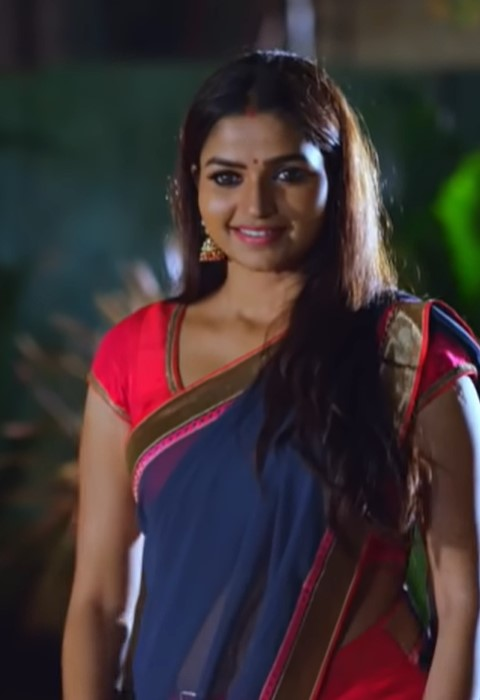
Actress Nithya Ram as Nandini - the titular character

The casting for "Nandini" was crucial to its narrative, with actress Nithya Ram taking on the demanding lead roles. In the first season, she impressively portrayed a dual role as Ganga and the enigmatic Nandini, the titular character. Her versatility was further showcased in the second season, where she tackled a triple role as Ganga, Nandini, and Janani. The first season of the series also featured a strong ensemble cast, with Khushbu Sundar and Riyaz Khan playing pivotal roles. Malayalam actor Rahul Ravi was cast as Arun, another central character, while other significant actors included Malayalam actress Malavika Wales as Janaki, Baby Adhitri Guruvayurappan as Devasena, Vijayakumar as Rajashekar, Gayatri Jayaraman as Bhairavi, and Narasimha Raju. The second season saw the addition of new talent like Vinay Gowda, Kavya Shastry, and Rashmi, among others, ensuring a fresh dynamic for the continuing storyline. Chaya Singh later stepped into the reincarnated role of Nandini, adding another layer to the character's journey.

=== Release ===
Nandini is the first South Indian television series to be broadcast in nine different languages across India. The series was released in Tamil for Sun TV and Kannada for Udaya TV, along with their dubbed versions in Malayalam and Telugu for Surya TV and Gemini TV respectively on 23 January 2017. Following its success, it was dubbed into Bengali for Sun Bangla, Marathi for Sun Marathi, Odia for Sun Odia, and Bhojpuri for Sun Bhojpuri. It was dubbed in Hindi for Sun Neo as "Nandini ka Pratishod". In addition, the series was reshot in Kannada for Udaya TV, where the first season was remade while the second season continued as the original production.

The Tamil version concluded on 22 December 2018, while the Malayalam, Bengali, and Marathi versions ended on 4 January 2019, 18 April 2021, and 11 March 2023, respectively. The Kannada adaptation aired until 31 July 2020, covering both the remade first season and the original second season. As of 2026, the Hindi, Odia, and Bhojpuri versions continue to air, with dubbed broadcasts of both seasons.

== Reception ==
=== Season 1 ===
This season was simultaneously launched in four languages- Tamil, Telugu, Malayalam and Kannada. In week 42 of 2017 and the following week, the show was at first position. In week 52 of 2018, it was at first position with 18.47 million impressions. In a press meet, actor Vijayakumar claimed that over 100 Million people watch Nandini everyday in the entire South India. This serial is also the most watched Tamil Serial of all time in Youtube, with its climax episode garnering over 22 Million views.

=== Season 2 ===
Season 2 was only launched in Kannada language. Even though the season had good TRP in its initial days, it began to drop after COVID-19 break and the show went off-air on 31 July 2020.
