= Jothi (TV series) =

Indian supernatural television series Nandhini 2

- Genre: Drama; Supernatural; Fantasy
- Story by: Sundar C
- Directed by: Raj Kapoor
- Starring: Meghashree; Chandana Shetty; Vishnu Unnikrishnan
- Opening theme: "Jothi"
- Country of origin: India
- Original language: Tamil
- No. of seasons: 1
- No. of episodes: 13

Production
- Producers: Sundar C Kushboo Sundar
- Cinematography: U. K. Senthil Kumar
- Editor: Sutheef S
- Production companies: Sun Entertainment; Avni Telemedia

Original release
- Network: Sun TV
- Release: 29 May – 1 August 2021

Related
- Nandini

Jothi is a 2021 Indian Tamil-language supernatural thriller television series, which aired on Sun TV on every weekend and later rescheduled to air on every Sunday. It was produced by Sundar C under the studio of Avni Telemedia.

It starred Meghashree portraying the title role, along with Chandana Shetty and Vishnu Unnikrishnan in the lead roles. This show was a sequel of "Nandini". The series went off air on 1 August 2021.

== Plot ==
Shivakami was the younger sister of Parvati, who belonged to the Shiva-Naga clan. When Parvati eloped with Ratnavel, Shivakami helped her. Enraged by this, the Karkotaka clan imprisoned Shivakami and cursed her.

Later, Shivakami discovered the remedy to break her curse: she needed to marry a Naga from a different serpent clan. Armed with this knowledge, she escaped from captivity and sought help from a landlord named Narasimham. Narasimham arranged her marriage with a Naga named Adisheshan.

Shivakami and Adisheshan eventually had two daughters—Ganga and Jyothi (both played by Meghashree). Around the same time, Adisheshan’s first wife, Indrasena, gave birth to a daughter named Shreya. Indrasena had been cursed by Adisheshan to turn into stone for attempting to steal the Nagamanikyam (sacred serpent gem), but her punishment was postponed until she gave birth.

Following the birth, Indrasena’s accomplice abducted Ganga and replaced her with Shreya. Meanwhile, Shivakami—aware that one of her children possessed Nagin powers—entrusted Jyothi to a man named Rangan, instructing him to raise her in secrecy for 25 years.

Shortly after, Padmavathi and Rajasekhar murdered Shivakami and Adisheshan to seize the Nagamanikyam. They raised Shreya in the palace, believing she was a Naga and expecting her to retrieve the sacred gem for them once she turned 25.

25 years later, a marriage was arranged between Anirudh and Shreya. However, upon discovering that Shreya was not actually a Naga, Padmavathi murdered her by pushing her into a well. Devastated by the loss, Anirudh fell into severe depression and was sent abroad, where he gradually forgot his past.

Two years later, Jyothi entered the palace as a maid, and Rangan introduced her to Padmavathi. Soon after, on a fine morning, Jyothi transformed into her true Naga form. Meanwhile, abroad, Ganga protected Anirudh from several dangers.

When Anirudh eventually returned home, he mistook Jyothi for Ganga and fell in love with her. Though Jyothi initially resisted due to various curses and unfavorable omens, Adisheshan appeared and revealed the complete truth to her. Realizing that their bond was eternal and unbroken by fate, Anirudh and Jyothi married, receiving Adisheshan’s divine blessings.

== Cast ==
=== Main ===
- Meghashree as Jothi Anirudh: A human element but has a snake powers. Aadhisheshan and Sivagami's elder daughter, Shreya's sister, Anirudh's wife; she was adopted and working as a servant in the palace and later turned as daughter-in-law.
- Chandana Shetty as Shreya: A Shapeshifting ("Icchadhari") snake. Aadhisheshan and Sivagami's younger daughter, Jothi's sister. She was protecting the "Naga Rathinam".
- Vishnu Unnikrishnan as Anirudh: Vasuki and Rajashekar's son, Padmavathi's grandson; Jothi's husband

=== Recurring ===
- Seema as Padmavathi
- Ramesh Pandit as Rajashekar
- Mercy Layal as Vasuki Rajashekar
- Anuradha
- Neela Menon as Leelavathi
- Advani as Naveena
- Sankavi as Manasa
- Sivasankar Master as Hakkim Bhai
- Jeeva Rajendran as Chandru
- Anu Mohan as Rangan
- Eesan Sujatha as Saraswathi
- KPY Palani as Korea
- Pollachi Babu
- Singamuthu
- Geetha Narayanan as Indhrasena
- Master Ashwin
- VJ Settai Senthil as Kumar
- Kottachi

=== Special appearances ===
- Nassar as Narasimhan - Jothi and Shreya's grandfather, Sivagami's father and Padmavathi's brother (Photographic appearance only)
- Kushboo Sundar as Sivagami Aadhisheshan - Jothi and Shreya's mother
- Aishwarya as Sambhavi - Padmavathi and Narasimhan's sister (Photographic appearance only)
- Power Star Srinivasan as Minister Nagarajan

== Production ==
The series began production in mid 2020 under title Nandini 2. The team completed filming more than 50 episodes, initially Sun TV rejected the show reportedly due to producer of the show, Khushbu Sundar's exit from Indian National Congress and her entry to Bharatiya Janata Party. Due to this political issue between the channel and the production company, producers tried to air the show in another channel and they had discussions with Zee Tamil and the channel also agreed to the same. But due to second wave of COVID-19, all television series stopped their production which led SUN TV Network to took over the show and Telugu dubbed version of the show was initially premiered on Gemini TV on 12 April 2021. After almost two months, the original Tamil version premiered on Sun TV on 29 May 2021 on every weekends by reducing it's episodes only aired 13 episodes .

== Dubbed Versions ==
Language	Title	Original release	Network(s)	Last aired
Telugu	Jyothi	12 April 2021	Gemini TV	14 May 2021
Bengali	Onno Roope Nandini	19 April 2021	Sun Bangla	9 May 2021
Kannada	Jyothi	10 July 2021	Udaya TV	15 August 2021
Malayalam	Jyothi	21 November 2021	Surya TV	26 June 2022
