= Meghashree =

Indian actress

- Born: Bengaluru, Karnataka India
- Occupation: Actress
- Years active: 2014–present

Meghashree is an Indian actress who predominantly works in Kannada, Telugu and Bhojpuri-language films. She is also known for playing the lead role in the supernatural television series Nagakannike and Jothi.

== Early life and career ==
Meghashree is originally from Thirthahalli but lived in Bengaluru. She made her film debut with the Telugu film Darlinge Osina Darlinge (2014) before starring in Anaganaga Oka Chitram (2015). She made her Tamil debut with Ka Ka Ka: Aabathin Arikuri (2017). That same year, she made her Kannada debut with the film March 22 and starred in a supporting role in the Telugu films Oxygen (2017) and Aravinda Sametha Veera Raghava (2018). She then appeared in several Kannada films including Krishna Tulasi (2018), Kaddu Mucchi (2019) and Dasharatha (2019). In a review of Krishna Tulasi by the Deccan Chronicle, the reviewer wrote that "it is Meghashree who makes a mark with this one".

Later, she played the lead roles in the Kannada television serials Naga Kannike and Ivalu Sujatha. She appeared as a wildcard entry in Bigg Boss Kannada season 6 in 2019. In 2021, Meghasri played the title role in a supernatural television series Jothi, which was a sequel to Nandini. After making her Bhojpuri debut in 2022, she featured in Farishta, as a lead actress opposite Khesari Lal Yadav, the film became a blockbuster and broke many records of past 10 years.

== Filmography ==
Year	Film	Role	Language	Ref.
2014	Darlinge Osina Darlinge		Telugu	
2015	Panchamukhi		Telugu	
2015	Anaganaga Oka Chitram	Chitti	Telugu	
2015	Kaki: Sound of Warning	Deepti	Telugu	
2016	Santhu Straight Forward	Ananya's friend	Kannada	
2017	Ka Ka Ka: Aabathin Arikuri	Deepti	Tamil	
2017	March 22	Amrutha	Kannada	
2017	Oxygen	Sruthi's sister	Telugu	
2018	Aravinda Sametha Veera Raghava	Veera Raghava's cousin	Telugu	
2018	Krishna Tulasi	Tulasi	Kannada	
2019	Kaddu Mucchi	Aishwarya	Kannada	
2019	Dasharatha	Dasharatha's daughter	Kannada	
2022	Manasagide		Kannada	
2022	Old Monk	Rukmini	Kannada	
2022	Rowdy Inspector	Suraj's wife	Bhojpuri	
2022	Bol Radha Bol	Radha	Bhojpuri	
2023	Farishta		Bhojpuri	
2023	Meherban		Bhojpuri	
2023	Laadla 2		Bhojpuri	
2025	Rhythm	Sangeetha	Kannada	
2025	Govardhan		Bhojpuri	

== Television ==
Year	Title	Role	Channel	Language	Notes	Ref.
2017	Nagakannike	Shesha	Colors Kannada	Kannada		
2018–2019	Bigg Boss Kannada 6	Contestant	Colors Kannada	Kannada	Evicted day 70	
2019–2020	Ivalu Sujatha	Sujatha	Colors Kannada	Kannada		
2021	Jothi	Jothi	Sun TV	Tamil	Sequel of Nandini	
