= Ivalu Sujatha =

- Genre: Drama
- Starring: Yeshwanth; Megashree; Aparna; Girija Lokesh
- Country of origin: India
- Original language: Kannada
- No. of episodes: 205

Production
- Producer: Srujan Lokesh
- Production location: Bengaluru
- Camera setup: Multi-camera
- Running time: 5:30 PM
- Production company: Lokesh Productions

Original release
- Network: Colors Kannada
- Release: 26 August 2019 – 12 June 2020

Ivalu Sujatha is an Indian Kannada language television drama that premiered on Colors Kannada on 26 August 2019. The show formally came to an end in June 2020. The show is an official remake of the Marathi television show Sukhachya Sarini He Man Baware.

== Cast ==
- Yeaswanth as Partha
- Meghashree as Sujatha
- Aparna as Durga, Partha’s mother
- Girija Lokesh as Aaji, Partha’s grandmother

== Adaptations ==
Language	Title	Original release	Network(s)	Last aired	Notes
Marathi	Sukhachya Sarini He Man Baware सुखाच्या सरींनी हे मन बावरे	9 October 2018	Colors Marathi	24 October 2020	Original
Kannada	Ivalu Sujatha ಇವಳು ಸುಜಾತ	26 August 2019	Colors Kannada	12 June 2020	Remake
