= Pushpaka Vimana (2017 film) =

- Movie poster
- Directed by: S. Ravindranath
- Screenplay by: S. Ravindranath
- Based on: Miracle in Cell No. 7 by Lee Hwan-kyung
- Produced by: Pawan Wadeyar; Vikhyath; Sukruth Devendra; Deepak Krishna; Deepak Kishore; Devanth
- Starring: Ramesh Aravind; Rachita Ram; Yuvina Parthavi
- Cinematography: Bhuvan Gowda
- Edited by: Suresh Arumugam
- Music by: Charan Raj
- Production companies: Vikhyath Chitra Productions; Pawan Wadeyar Film Factory
- Release date: 6 January 2017
- Country: India
- Language: Kannada

Pushpaka Vimana is a 2017, Indian Kannada drama film directed by S. Ravindranath, making his debut. The film stars Ramesh Aravind, acting in his 100th Kannada film, as the protagonist playing the father role. Rachita Ram and Baby Yuvina Parthavi play the daughter's role. Prominent Bollywood actress Juhi Chawla is seen in a song sequence, marking her re-entry to Kannada films after 18 years. The film's title is borrowed from the 1987 silent film of the same name.

The film is a joint venture between Vikhyath Chitra Productions and Pawan Wadeyar Film Factory. The film's score and soundtrack is by Charan Raj whilst the cinematography is by Bhuvan Gowda. The film's teaser clocking 2minutes 37seconds and portraying the love and affection between the father and the daughter garnered much praise for Ramesh's expressive act and Bhuvan's cinematography.

The film was reported to be in contention for Best Adapted Screenplay at the Oscars, though it did not enter the long-list and short-list. The film is an unofficial remake of the 2013 South Korean movie Miracle in Cell No. 7 and lost the copyright infringement case against Kross Pictures.

== Plot ==
The story begins when a young lawyer reopens a closed case, claiming that the man convicted of rape and murder was innocent. When the court asks for proof, she reveals that she is his daughter.

An intellectually disabled man, Ramesh Arvind, comes from a family of army employees and hopes to follow the same profession, but his disability prevents him from doing so. Instead, he owns and drives a rickshaw to support himself and his daughter (Baby Yuvina). The two share a happy life and save money to buy her a toy aeroplane.

When they visit a shop to purchase it, they find themselves slightly short of money and decide to return the following day. However, the daughter of a police chief wants the same toy and buys it immediately, prompting Ramesh to argue with the police. The next day, he encounters the girl while driving his rickshaw. She offers to take him to another shop where he can find a similar aeroplane, but she is subsequently found dead. A woman claims to have witnessed Ramesh raping her and reports him to the police.

Ramesh is arrested, while his daughter leaves home and is taken in by a charity school. She remains in contact with her father. Meanwhile, the jail in-charge and Ramesh's cellmates gradually realise that he had been attempting to give the girl first aid, having learnt basic treatment through a public programme. They sympathise with him, but the girl's father threatens to kill Ramesh's daughter unless he accepts responsibility for the crime. Fearing for his daughter's life, Ramesh confesses in court and is sentenced to death.

Ramesh is hanged despite his innocence. The jail in-charge, who has also lost a child, adopts his daughter and supports her ambition to become a lawyer.

Years later, she reopens her father's case and proves that he was innocent. The court accepts that Ramesh was not responsible for the crime. She thanks those who helped her and is overjoyed to have cleared her father's name.

== Cast ==
- Ramesh Aravind as Anantaramaiah
- Rachita Ram as Puttalakshmi
- Yuvina Parthavi as young Puttalakshmi
- Ravi Kale
- Mandeep Roy
- Rockline Sudhakar
- Manjunath
- K. S. Sridhar
- Juhi Chawla in a special appearance in song "Jhilka Jhilka"

== Production ==
=== Development ===
Early reports of the film emerged in December 2015 that actor Ramesh Aravind would feature in a new film which has the title of the 1987 silent film Pushpaka Vimana. Initially apprehensive about using the same title, the team later decided to go ahead with the same as the story would connect to the title. Ramesh's role was revealed to be that of a father to a little girl and is "crazy about planes". The producers chose S. Ravindranath to helm the director role, making his debut in the feature film.

=== Casting ===
After roping in Ramesh for the lead role, producers went in search for a baby girl who could play the daughter character to Ramesh. They finally selected Yuvina Parthavi after being impressed with her performance in the Tamil film Veeram (2015). Actress Rachita Ram was selected to play the role of grown-up daughter, the producers of the movie were claiming that even though the role of Rachita Ram is not full-fledged, it would be a prominent character which would last for about 10minutes. After launching the teaser, on 15 January 2016, the makers approached Bollywood actress Juhi Chawla to act in a few scenes including appearing in a special song in the film. This film would be Juhi's re-entry to Kannada cinema since her last release Shanti Kranti in 1991.

=== Teaser release ===
On 15 January 2016, a teaser was released which saw the 2minutes 37seconds of video showing the emotional attachment between the father played by Ramesh and his daughter played by Yuvina. Upon the release of teaser, huge appreciations poured in from different quarters particularly pointing out Ramesh's acting along with Bhuvan's cinematography. The teaser was shown to Juhi Chawla before signing her into the film.

== Music ==
Pushpaka Vimana

Soundtrack album by Charan Raj
- Released: 21 September 2016
- Recorded: 2016
- Genre: Feature Film Soundtrack
- Length: 19:55
- Label: Vikhyath Studios

Charan Raj chronology
Jeerjimbe (2016)	Pushpaka Vimana (2016)	Tagaru (2018)

The music and background score for the film is composed by Charan Raj. The soundtrack album contains six songs.

Track listing
No.	Title	Lyrics	Singer(s)	Length
1.	"Jilka Jilka"	Pawan Wadeyar	Indu Nagaraj	4:27
2.	"Jogulave"	Kiran Kaverappa	Charan Raj	2:41
3.	"Mugilu Belmugilu"	K. Kalyan	Haricharan	4:03
4.	"Baana Thoredu Neeli"	Jayant Kaikini	Siddhartha Belmannu	4:21
5.	"Ee Srushtiya"	Dhananjay	Ganesh Karanth	2:05
6.	"Pushpaka Vimana (Theme)"	Charan Raj	Charan Raj	2:18
Total length:				1

== Critical reception ==
The Times of India rated the film 4 out of 5 and commented, "The film scores high technically. Bhuvan Gowda's fantastic visuals are complemented beautifully by Charan Raj's soulful background score. Their story is no edge-of-the-seat thriller but instead is a wonderful tale of love between a father and daughter, which unfolds in its own pace but keeps you hooked to the screen." Deccan Chronicle saw the film worthy of 3.5/5 and reviewed and called the film to be "flying high on emotion".

Writing to The Hindu, Archana Nathan was critical about the film and called it "A turbulent flight" further remarking that "it relies heavily on dialogue focussing more on telling rather than showing, at times even screaming the sentiment at its audience."

== Copyright infringement ==
Korea based Kross Pictures filed a copyright infringement case against the makers of the film citing proper remake rights have not been acquired from the production company which holds the rights of the film Miracle in Cell No. 7. The director, S. Ravindranath claimed that the film is not a "remake" but is taken inspiration from four films such as Life is Beautiful, I am Sam, Miracle in Cell No. 7 and The Pursuit of Happyness. However, the Bombay High Court issued an ad-interim injunction against the exhibition and distribution of the movie as prima facie it found the movie to be a copy of the Korean movie.
