= Kaki (film) =

Kaki Ka Ka Ka: Aabathin Arikuri
- Release poster
- Directed by: Manon M
- Story by: Ronald Raj S Williams
- Produced by: Kiran Pathikonda
- Starring: Ashok; Meghashree; Sangeetha Bhat; Kiran Pattikonda
- Cinematography: Saravana Natarajan
- Edited by: Zashi Omer
- Music by: Amruth
- Production company: Arpita Creations
- Release dates: 12 December 2015 (Telugu); 22 July 2017 (Tamil)
- Running time: 112 minutes
- Country: India
- Languages: Telugu; Tamil

Kaki is a 2015 Indian romantic-horror film directed by Manon and starring Ashok, Meghashree, Sangeetha Bhat, and Kiran Pattikonda. The film was simultaneously shot in Telugu and Tamil with the latter version titled Ka Ka Ka: Aabathin Arikuri (transl. [crow sound]: danger looms). The Tamil version was released in 2017.

== Plot ==
In the United States, Karthik (Ashok) marries Deepthi (Meghashree). They both come to India to assist Kiran (Kiran Pattikonda) in his factory and decide to stay in his village.

As Karthik is busy with his work, he goes to the city and leaves Deepti in the bungalow with Ammu (Baby Yuvina) and the watchman (Ramesh Pandit). One day, Chitram / Natchatiram (Yogi Babu), a fan of Vikram, enters the house and introduces himself as the cook. Evil forces start to take over Ammu and Natchatiram notices this while talking to her. The evil forces prevent Kathik and Deepti from uniting. The evil force also includes a ghost (Sangeetha Bhat). After the force creates havoc in the house, a doctor (Nassar), who is Deepthi's father. Who is this ghost? What do these evil forces have to do with Karthik and Deepti? These questions form the rest of the story.

== Cast ==
- Ashok as Karthik
- Meghashree as Deepti
- Sangeetha Bhat as Ghost
- Kiran Pattikonda as Kiran
- Nassar as Deepthi's father
- Jayasudha as Mother Clara
- Yogi Babu as Chitram (Telugu) / Natchatiram (Tamil)
- Ramesh Pandit as Watchman
- Baby Yuvina as Ammu

== Production ==
The film was shot in Tamil and Telugu languages simultaneously and is directed by Manon, who worked as an assistant to directors P. Vasu, Vetrimaaran and Raghavan, in his directorial debut. Kiran Pattikonda, who debuts as a producer, also plays a role in the film. The film was shot in Chennai, Hyderabad, Visakhapatnam, and Puducherry. Ashok and Meghashree were to portray a couple in the film with the latter making her Tamil film debut. The makers initially roped in Shruti Ramakrishnan to portray the second heroine and is seen during the flashback portions before she was replaced by Kannada actress Sangeetha Bhat. Saravana Natarajan, an assistant to Velraj, worked as the cinematographer for the film while Amruth was brought in to compose the music. Nassar, Jayasudha and Yogi Babu play supporting roles in the film.

== Reception ==
Regarding the Tamil version, a critic from Maalai Malar gave the film a rating of eighty out of a hundred and stated how "Overall there is a lack of suspense in Ka Ka Ka: Aabathin Arikuri".
