= Bineesh Bastin =

Indian actor (born 1990)

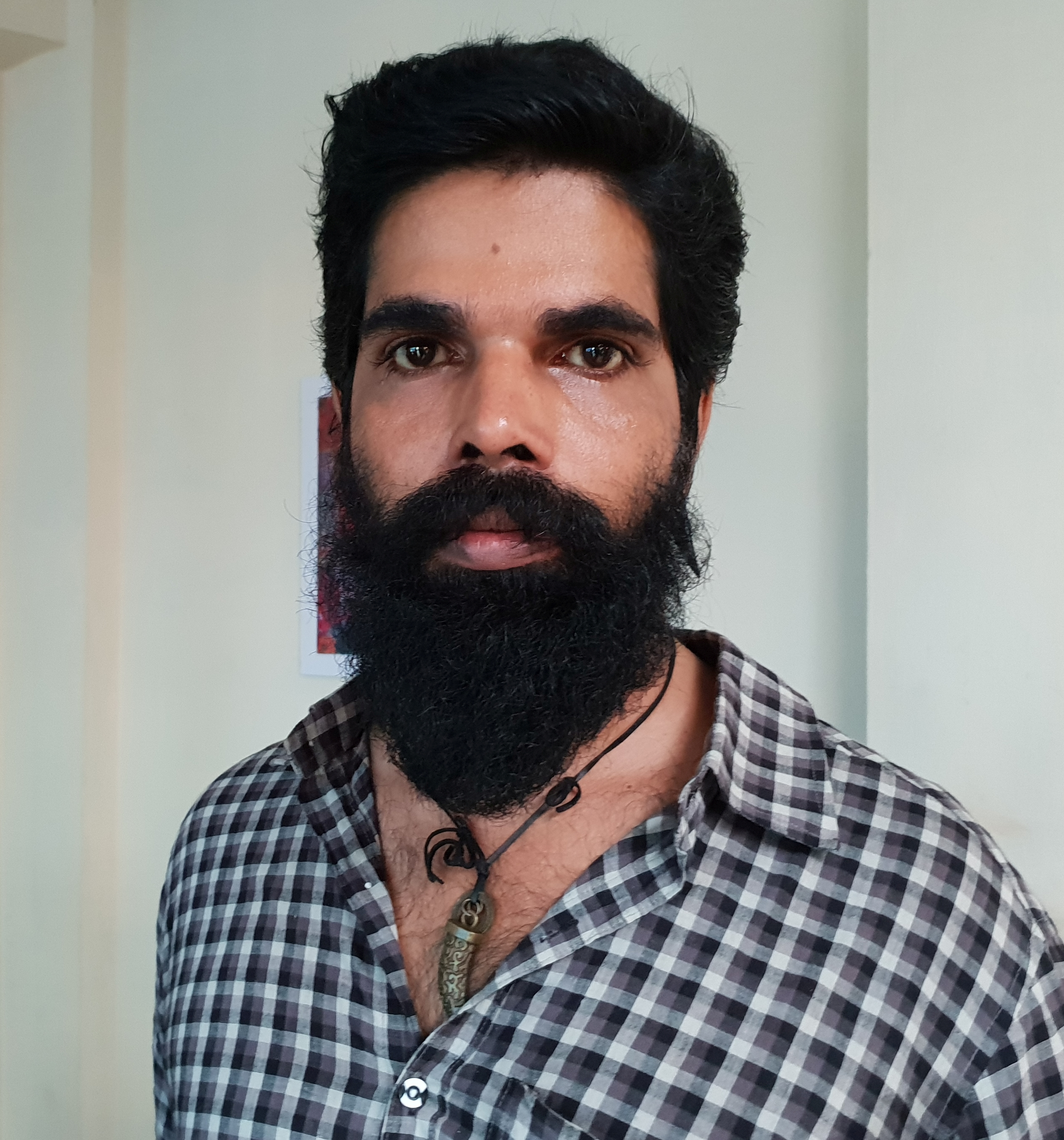
- Born: 15 June 1990 (age 36); Kochi, Kerala, India
- Citizenship: Indian
- Education: St. Albert’s College, Kochi
- Occupation: Actor
- Years active: 2009 - present
- Spouse: Thara Reji John

YouTube information
- Channel: Bineesh Bastin
- Subscribers: 608K
- Views: 226M
- Last updated: September 2026
- Website: bineeshbastin.com

Bineesh Bastin (born 15 June 1990) is an Indian actor who works in Malayalam and Tamil films. He is best known for his role in Theri.

== Filmography ==
Year	Title	Role	Notes	Ref.
2009	Angel John		uncredited	
2012	Thappana		uncredited	
2016	Kattumakkan			
2016	Theri	Chetan’s henchmen		
2016	Dum	Njandu		
2016	Kattappanayile Rithwik Roshan	Sthiram Gunda		
2018	Theekuchiyum Panithulliyum			
2019	Porinju Mariam Jose	Prince’s Henchmen		
2021	Muddy	Noah’s Henchmen		
2022	Twenty One Gms	Tipper Tony		
2022	Son of Alibaba Nalpathonnaman	Sumo Ravi		
2024	Kallanmaarude Veedu	Father Dominic		
2024	Bad Boyz			

== Controversy ==
In October 2019, National Award winning filmmaker Anil Radhakrishnan Menon refused to share stage with Bastin as they both were invited for the function at Government Medical College, Palakkad. Anil Radhakrishnan mentioned Bastin wasn't a A-Tier list Actor. College authorities threatened Bastin to leave or will call the police. Bastin walked to Stage and sat on the floor while Anil Radhakrishnan was making a speech.
