= Shalil Kallur =

Indian film director

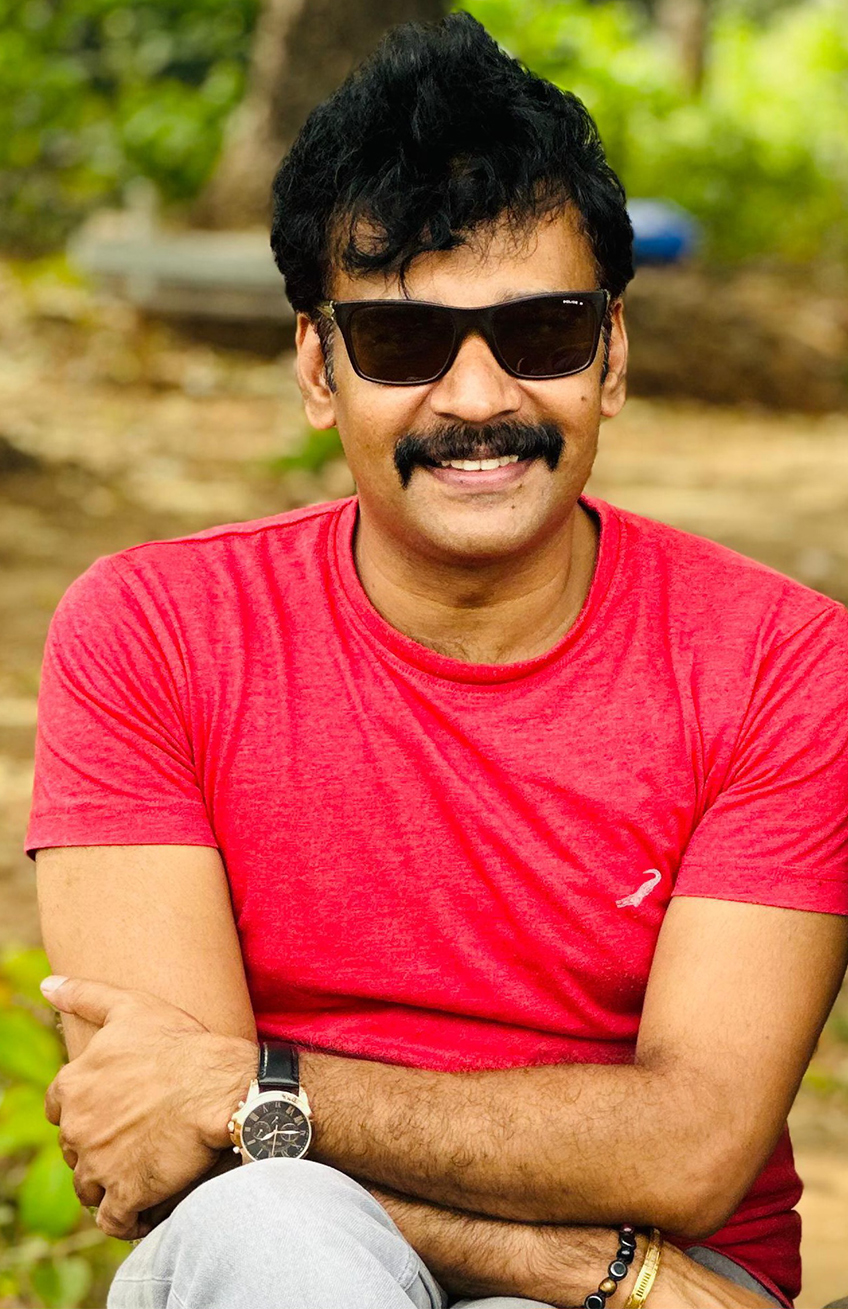
- Born: Kallur, Palakkad, India
- Occupations: Film director Screenwriter; Producer
- Years active: 2013–present

Shalil Kallur is an Indian film director, producer and screenwriter working in Malayalam films. His debut directorial venture Dolls was released in 2013 and his second film Kattumakkan, a multi starrer with veterans like Mukesh, Vijay Menon and Nassar in lead roles, was released on 12 February 2016.

== Career ==
Kallur started his career as music album director and later made Manasa Smaraami, the documentary on actor Mala Aravindan. He also directed the documentaries Reality of UAE and Gulf Script along with Tele cinemas Perunaal Raavu, Thambu, Meghangal and Theeram while helming successful television shows Mahabalithamburan Varunnae and Mayaviyude Albuthalokam on Jeevan TV before turning the director with Dolls.

Kallur, the managing director of production house MJS Media, said that he is happy with his first outing Dolls even though it was a commercial failure, mentioning it as a perfect movie in all aspects for a debutant director.

Kallur's Salmon 3D had playback singer Vijay Yesudas in the lead role.

== Filmography ==
Year	Film	Language	Credited as			
Year	Film	Language	Director	Producer	Writer	Actor
2013	Dolls	Malayalam	Yes	Yes	Yes	
2016	Kattumakkan	Malayalam	Yes	Yes	Yes	Yes
2020	Deira Diaries	Malayalam		Yes		
2023	Salmon 3D	Tamil	Yes	Yes	Yes	Yes
2024	Abhirami	Malayalam		Yes		
2024	Cicada	Malayalam				Yes
TBA	Disease X: The Zombie Experiment	Malayalam; Tamil				Yes
