= Chocolate (Malayalam TV series) =

2019 Malayalam-language TV series

- Genre: soap opera
- Created by: Inspire Films
- Written by: shashwat rai
- Directed by: Biju Varghese
- Country of origin: India
- Original language: Malayalam
- No. of seasons: 1
- No. of episodes: 215

Production
- Camera setup: Multi-camera
- Running time: 20-25 minutes
- Production company: Vision Time India Pvt Ltd

Original release
- Network: Surya TV
- Release: 20 May 2019 – 20 March 2020

Related
- Chocolate (Tamil TV series) Chocolate (Indian TV series)

Chocolate is a 2019 Malayalam-language soap opera directed by Biju Varghese, starring Sandra Babu, Bipin Jose, Rahul Ravi and Shreya Surendran. It premiered on Surya TV from 20 May 2019 and the show abruptly ended due to the global COVID-19 pandemic. The show is produced by Vision Time India Pvt Ltd. It is the officially remade into Sun TV as Chocolate.

== Synopsis ==
Chocolate is the story of Vikram and Shyamili. Vikram is a wealthy businessman and Shyamili an ordinary girl with an extraordinary talent for baking mouthwatering dark chocolate cookies. Circumstances force her to quit baking until she crosses paths with Vikram.

== Cast ==
Main

- Sandra Babu as Shyamili Vikram
- Rahul Ravi / Bipin Jose as Vikram
- Sriya Surendran as Soundarya
- Rahul Ravi as Roshan

Recurring

- Ravikumar as Parameswaran Mangalath, Vikram's grandfather
- Niharika/Thara Kalyan / Sharika Menon as Kousalya, Vikram's mother
- Lishoy as Sethumadhavan, Vikram's father
- KPAC Saji as Lakshmanan, Vikram's uncle
- Nila Raj as Chithra, Lakshmanan's wife
- Kottayam Pradeep as Balan, Shyamili's father
- Gayathri Priya as Lakshmi, Shyamili's mother
- Shalini as Shalini, Shyamili's sister
- Sriraj Amrithraj as Raghu
- Kalyan Khanna as Shanthanu
- Avinash Ashok as Anirudh
- Akshitha Ashok as Vyshnavi
- Vaigha Rose as Helen
- Rahul Mohan as Menon
- Reshmi Boban
- Sreelakshmi Sreekumar

== Adaptations ==
Language	Title	Original release	Network(s)	Last aired	Notes
Malayalam	Chocolate ചോക്ലേറ്റ്	20 May 2019	Surya TV	20 March 2020	Original
Tamil	Chocolate சாக்லேட்	16 December 2019	Sun TV	25 March 2020	Remake
