= Jonita Doda =

Indian actress, filmmaker and entrepreneur

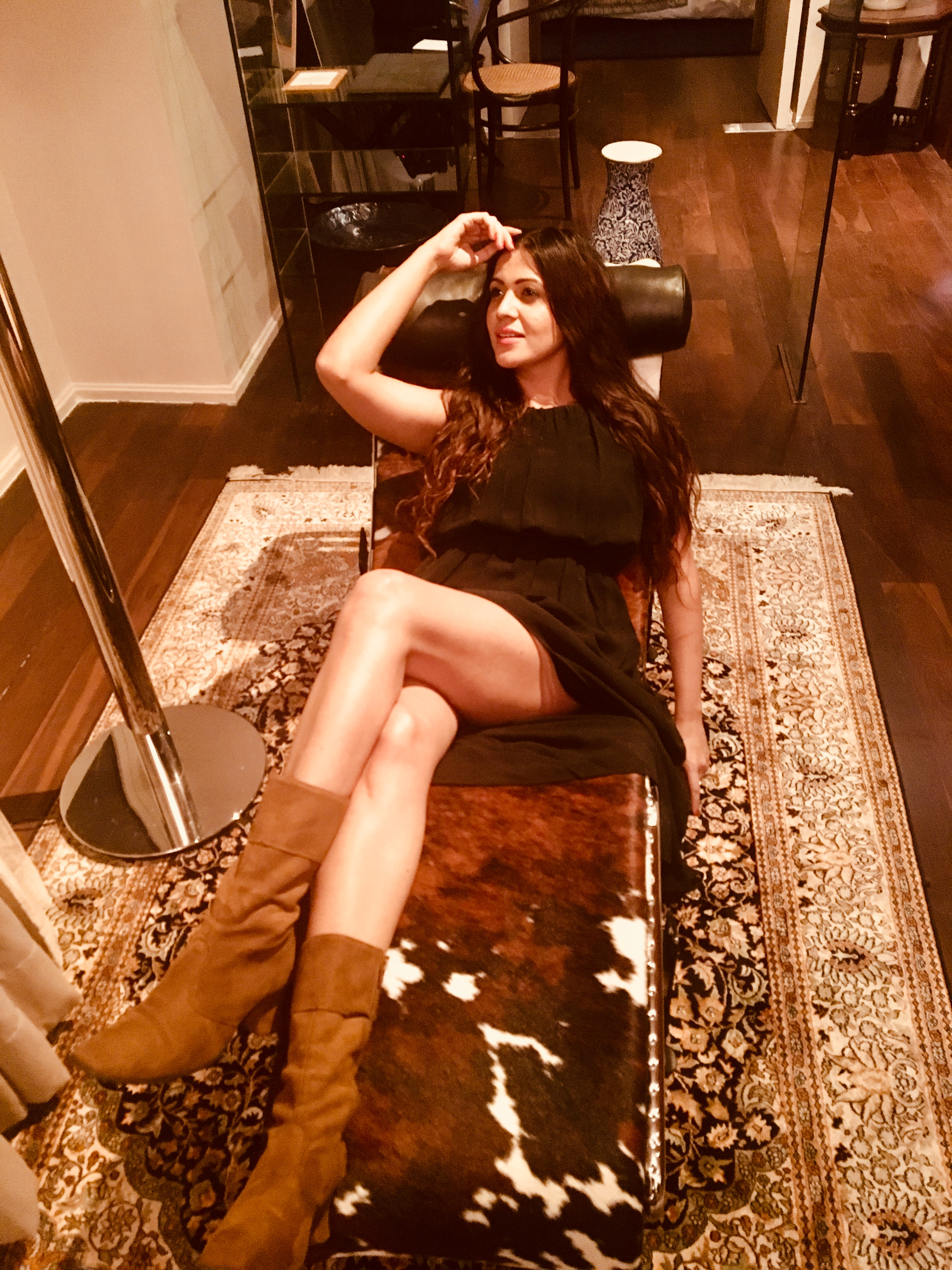
- Born: Chandigarh, India
- Occupations: Actress, Director & Entrepreneur
- Notable work: Mumbai Mist Salmon 3D Heer Unstoppable (2017) India the Golden Sparrow (Documentary)
- Parent(s): Inderjit Doda and Jaswinder Doda
- Awards: Life Achievers Award (2023); Moonwhite Films International Film Fest - MWFIFF (2021); TSR-TV9 National Film Award (2019); 3rd Global summit business awards (2019)
- Website: Official Website

Jonita Doda (also known as Juanita Doda) is an Indian actress, filmmaker, and entrepreneur. She is recognized for her roles in regional and Hindi cinema and the fashion industry. Doda is the co-founder of both Chandigarh Fashion Week and Neonwale, a neon sign company.

== Early life ==
Doda was born in Chandigarh, India, to Inderjit Doda and Jaswinder Doda. She was raised in a culturally diverse household that bridged Hindu and Sikh traditions.

== Career ==
Doda began her acting career during her senior school years with the romantic comedy Dil Bechara Pyar Ka Maara. After completing her MBA, she fully committed to acting in the South Indian film industry with Minchu (2010), a remake of a successful Tamil movie Thimiru. She starred in Punjabi cinema in the movie Chak Jawana(2010), alongside Gurdas Mann.

In 2017, she directed and played the lead role in the short film Heer Unstoppable, which earned her the Best Director award at PCIFF. That same year, she also starred in Where Has the Time Gone (Mumbai Mist).

Doda has been the face of Amul Cheese and Kalaniketan and has appeared in many commercials.

== Television appearances ==
In addition to her film work, Doda served as a celebrity judge on the reality TV show Miss PTC Punjabi (2022), a beauty contest that has been running for over 14 years.

== Cine Valley Productions ==
Doda is also the founder of Cine Valley Productions, under which she has produced various films and projects.

=== Filmography ===
Year	Film Title	Role	Language
2010	Minchu	Lead	Kannada
2010	Chak Jawana	Lead	Punjabi
2012	Yamley Jatt Yamley	Lead	Punjabi
2011	Yaara O Dildara	Lead	Punjabi
2015	Patta Patta Singhan Da Vairi	Lead	Punjabi
2017	Heer Unstoppable	Lead	Hindi/Punjabi
2017	Where Has the Time Gone	Lead	Hindi
2023	Salmon 3D	Lead	Tamil
2024	Kirayenama	Lead	Hindi

Her film Mumbai Mist, directed by Madhur Bhandarkar, received a standing ovation at the BRICS Film Festival. Her role in the song Kadhal En Kaviye from Salmon 3D became highly popular.

=== Directing ===
Doda made her directorial debut with the short film Heer Unstoppable (2017), which earned her the Best Director award at the PCIFF and was officially selected on many international film festivals.

== Entrepreneurship ==
Doda co-founded Chandigarh Fashion Week, a platform that promotes the latest trends in luxury, fashion and supports emerging designers and artisans & handicraft. She is also the co-founder of Neonwale, a neon sign company, with her brother Harshdeep Doda.

== Environmental activism ==
Doda has directed the documentary India the Golden Sparrow – Disaster Risk Reduction, which is officially selected at 4 International Film Festival. Recently, she was invited to Russia by the Save and Preserve Festival and Organization to speak on environmental issues, an event that was covered by Russia 1.

== Philanthropy and social initiatives ==
Doda organized medical camps in slum areas, supporting cultural programs for individuals with physical disabilities, and advocating for AIDS awareness, anti-drug campaigns, and the fight against female infanticide.

In 2023, Doda participated in the Bharat Jodo Yatra being with Rahul Gandhi.
