= Chocolate (Tamil TV series) =

2019 Tamil-language TV series

- Genre: soap opera
- Created by: Inspire Films Content Private Limited
- Written by: S.Marathu Shankar
- Directed by: Suresh Krissna (1-32); Azhagar (33-70); Anshar Khan (71–84)
- Creative director: V.Chandrasekhar K.Ramakrishnan
- Starring: Priyanka Kumar; Rahul Ravi; Vandana Brundha; Vicky Roshan
- Theme music composer: Dhina
- Opening theme: "Yaar Ival Chocolate Pennival"
- Composer: Hari
- Country of origin: India
- Original language: Tamil
- No. of seasons: 1
- No. of episodes: 84

Production
- Executive producers: Dhivya Dinesh; R.Dinesh
- Producer: Vaidehi Ramamurthy
- Cinematography: Sanjay Loganath; G.K Ganesh Raja
- Editor: K.Lakshmikanth Vasigaran
- Camera setup: Multi-camera
- Running time: 20-25 minutes
- Production companies: Sun Entertainment; Vision Time India Private Limited

Original release
- Network: Sun TV
- Release: 16 December 2019 – 31 March 2020

Related
- Chocolate (Malayalam TV series)

Chocolate is a 2019–2020 Tamil-language soap opera starring Priyanka Kumar, Rahul Ravi, and Vandana Brundha. It premiered on Sun TV on 16 December 2019 and temporarily ended on 31 March 2020 with 84 episodes due to the COVID-19 pandemic, This serial was replacement of the previous serial Mahalakshmi. This serial was produced by Sun Entertainment, and Vision Time India Private Limited. It was directed by K Venpa Kathiresan. This serial is the official remake of the Surya TV's Malayalam serial Chocolate.

== Synopsis ==
Chocolate is the story of Vikram and Iniya. Vikram is a wealthy businessman, and Iniya an ordinary girl with an extraordinary talent for baking mouthwatering dark chocolate cookies. Circumstances force her to quit baking until she crosses paths with Vikram.

== Cast ==
=== Main ===
- Priyanka as Iniya: Vikram's wife
- Rahul Ravi as Vikram: Iniya's husband
- Vandana Brundha as Pallavi

=== Recurring ===
- Mamilla Shailaja Priya as Renuka: Vikram's mother
- Abhishek Shankar as Sanjay Kumar: Vikram's father
- Akshitha Ashok as Vaishali: Vikram's younger sister
- Ravikumar as Narayanan; Vikram's paternal grandfather
- Gayathri Priya as Sivagami: Iniya's mother
- Sathish Kumar as Vasudevan: Iniya's father
- Rithika Tamil Selvi as Amrudha aka Ammu: Iniya's younger sister
- Swapna as Ramya: Vikram's paternal aunt
- Moses R Wilky as Ramesh: Vikram's paternal uncle
- Vignesh Reddy as Rahul: Vikram's paternal cousin brother
- Bhanuprakash as Pallavi's father
- Kiran and Gve Krishna as Siddharth aka Siddhu: Vikram's paternal cousin brother
- Vishwanathan as Vishwanathan: Vikram's office worker
- Vicky Roshan as Kumaravel aka Kumaran: Iniya's maternal cousin; Parvathi's son
- Rekha Suresh as Parvathi: Kumaran's mother; Vasudevan's sister; Iniya's maternal aunt
- Hensha Deepan as Sumathi: Kumaran's wife

=== Special appearance ===
- Chef Damodharan as himself

== Adaptations ==
Language	Title	Original release	Network(s)	Last aired	Notes
Malayalam	Chocolate ചോക്ലേറ്റ്	20 May 2019	Surya TV	20 March 2020	Original
Tamil	Chocolate சாக்லேட்	16 December 2019	Sun TV	31 March 2020	Remake

== Production ==
Initially aired during afternoons from Monday to Saturday, in March 2020, it was shifted to a night slot.

Rahul Ravi played the lead role of Vikram in the Malayalam version of the series. However, he also joined the lead for this Tamil version as Vikram and he worked for both the series. However, due to work schedule conflict, he was replaced by Bipin Jose in the Malayalam series.
