= Muddu Manase =

- Film poster
- Directed by: Ananth Shain
- Screenplay by: Ananth Shain
- Story by: Ananth Shain
- Produced by: Ramesh; Jeevan Shetty; H. R. Suresh Gowda
- Starring: Aru Gowda; Aishwarya Nag; Nithya Ram
- Cinematography: Madhav Salunke
- Edited by: K. M. Prakash
- Music by: Vineeth Raj Menon
- Production companies: MMS Movies; RR Gowda Productions
- Distributed by: RS Films
- Release date: 28 August 2015
- Running time: 149 minutes
- Country: India
- Language: Kannada

Muddu Manase (transl. Sweet mind) is a 2015 Indian Kannada romance drama film directed by Ananth Shain. It stars Aru Gowda, Nithya Ram and Aishwarya Nag in lead roles, the former two of whom made their debuts with the film. Achyuth Kumar, Padmaja Rao and Padmini Prakash feature in supporting roles. The title of the film was taken from a track of the 2002 Kannada film Majestic.

The film score and soundtrack were composed by debutante Vineeth Raj Menon, and lyrics for each of the six tracks in the film were penned six directors of Kannada cinema. Upon theatrical release on 28 August 2015, the film received mixed reviews from critics. The film's music, cinematography and the acting performance of Gowda received praise, and the screenplay was criticized.

== Plot ==
The film tells the story of a love triangle around Suresh (Gowda), and how he goes about dealing with his old lover as he falls in love with another girl in different circumstances and time.

== Cast ==
- Arun Gowda as Suresh aka Suri
- Nithya Ram as Poorvi
- Aishwarya Nag as Mouna
- Achyuth Kumar
- Padmaja Rao
- Padmini Prakash as Suresh's mother
- Prakash Kagodu
- Shreya

== Soundtrack ==
Muddu Manase

Soundtrack album by Vineeth Raj Menon
- Released: 2015
- Genre: Feature film soundtrack
- Label: Anand Audio
- Producer: Vineeth Raj Menon

Vineeth Raj Menon chronology
Muddu Manase (2015)	Prema Pallakki (2015)

The music is composed by debutant Vineeth Raj Menon.

The lyrics have been by penned by 6 prominent directors of Kannada films: Yogaraj Bhat, Shashank, Suni, A. P. Arjun, Santhu and V. Nagendra Prasad. Another well known director Prem (of Jogi fame) has sung a song for this album.

The songs received good reviews and the album has been very well received. The song "Edeyal Yaro Ghazal" came in for special praise because the rarely used word "Kaadhal" (ಕಾದಲ್) was used in a Kannada song for the first time. "Kaadhal" means 'love' in Tamil but is also old Kannada for 'love'. V. Nagendra Prasad won the Karnataka State Film Awards for Best Lyricist 2015 for this song.

The music got further praise after release of the movie. Many reviewers considered the music of Vineeth Raj Menon as the highlight of the film.

Track listing
No.	Title	Lyrics	Music	Singer(s)	Length
1.	"Edeyal Yaro Ghazal"	V. Nagendra Prasad	Vineeth Raj Menon	Rajesh Krishnan, Archana Ravi
2.	"Thinthale Thinthale"	Shashank	Vineeth Raj Menon	Vijay Prakash, Shamitha Malnad
3.	"Aago Heego"	A. P. Arjun	Vineeth Raj Menon	Palak Muchhal
4.	"Dooradondu"	Santhu	Vineeth Raj Menon	Prem, Archana Ravi
5.	"Neev Kelabardu"	Yogaraj Bhat	Vineeth Raj Menon	Kailash Kher
6.	"Meese Chiguru"	Suni	Vineeth Raj Menon	Archana Ravi

== Reception ==
Shashiprasad S. M. of Deccan Chronicle rated the film 3/5 and wrote, "The songs are the best part of the film which makes the normal experience extraordinary. Watchable, and recommended for those who missed their first love". Sunayana Suresh of The Times of India gave it 2.5/5 stars and wrote, "This film is sweet, has some good visuals, but the climax can give an aspiring screenwriter lessons on how not to stretch a film. Watch it if you like your dose of masala-laden dramas." Shyam Prasad S. of Bangalore Mirror wrote, "The freshness in the story is marred by a slow paced narrative and the intrusion of some cliched incidents, fights and dialogues. Not that there isn’t any thing new."
