= Abhirami (2024 film) =

2024 Malayalam film

- Film poster
- Directed by: Mushthaque Rahman Kariyaden
- Written by: Vaheed Zaman
- Produced by: Shalil Kallur; Madhu Karuvath; Santhosh Radhakrishnan; Shabeek Thayyil
- Starring: Gayathri Suresh; Roshan Basheer; Harikrishnan
- Cinematography: Shihab Ongallur
- Edited by: Naveen P. Vijayan
- Music by: Sibu Sukumaran
- Production companies: MJS Media; Spectac Movies; Copernicus Productions
- Release date: 7 June 2024
- Running time: 107 minutes
- Country: India
- Language: Malayalam

Abhirami is a 2024 Indian Malayalam-language comedy drama film directed by Mushthaque Rahman Kariyaden. The film was produced by Shalil Kallur, Madhu Karuvath, Santhosh Radhakrishnan and Shabeek Thayyil under the banner of MJS Media, Spectac Movies and Copernicus Productions. The film features Gayathri Suresh, Roshan Basheer and Harikrishnan.

== Plot ==
A Dubai-based nurse becomes popular after filming a video with a famous scientist. Hired by a PR company, she becomes a star, but loses her freedom and faces threats of compensation. However, she resolves to make a comeback with the help of the same person who featured with her in the viral post. She finally breaks the chain and emerges from the virtual world to the real world.

== Cast ==
- Gayathri Suresh
- Roshan Basheer
- Harikrishnan
- Sarah Cyriac
- Naveen Illath
- Ameya Mathew

== Music ==
The music and film score is composed by Sibu Sukumaran.

== Release ==
The film was released in theatres on 7 June 2024.

=== Home Media ===
The film’s post-theatrical streaming rights have been acquired by manoramaMAX. The film started streaming on 25 September 2026.

== Reception ==
Abhirami received generally mixed reviews. In his review, Rohit Panikker of Times Now wrote, "A Film That Informs Better Than It Entertains" also gave rating the movie 2.5/5.
