= Kattumakkan =

2016 film by Shalil Kallur

- Theatrical
- Directed by: Shalil Kallur
- Written by: Shalil Kallur
- Produced by: MJS Media; Mathew Arracken
- Starring: Mukesh; Nassar; Rahul Ravi
- Cinematography: Anil Eswar
- Edited by: V.T.Sreejith
- Music by: Sejo John
- Production company: MJS Media
- Distributed by: Mahadeva Cinemas
- Release date: 12 February 2016
- Country: India
- Language: Malayalam

Kattumakkan (English: Wildcat) is a 2016 Indian Malayalam-language feature film directed by Shalil Kallur and starring Mukesh, Vijay Menon and Nassar with Pashanam Shaji, Dharmajan Bolgatty, Satheesh Menon and S. P. Sreekumar. The film introduces Rahul and Eden Kuriakosse as hero and heroine respectively.

== Summary ==
It's the story of Madhavan's life, character played by Mukesh. Madhavan is an ordinary man living in a village with his wife Gauthami and children Neethu and Rahul. An unexpected person came into their happy family life and very soon their happiness and family is destroyed by that person. Madhavan's was not the first family thus destroyed by that unknown person. But Madhavan is the first one who got ready to take his revenge upon that man.

Madhavan had planned that man's murder and he executes it. But he not tried to escape from the punishment. He surrendered to the police. But the unexpected turn of events happens in a way that police investigation shows that Madahavan was innocent and that unknown person had died even before Madhavan had killed him. And there are few more people came out with the claim that they killed that particular person and they also had evidence in their hands to prove that they are the killers. Then the investigation becomes really interesting and that is what forms the plot of this film.

== Cast ==
- Rahul Ravi as Rahul
- Mukesh as Madhavan
- Anju Nair as Gauri
- Vijay Menon as Rahul
- Nassar
- Eden Kuriakose
- Niyathi Ashok
- Aiswarya Nath
- Satheesh Menon
- S. P. Sreekumar as Dr. Raveendran
- Dharmajan Bolgatty
- Pashanam Shaji
- Indrans
- Vishnu Unnikrishnan
- Bineesh Bastin
- Kulappulli Leela

== Soundtrack ==
The film's music was composed by Shine Issai and Murali Guruvayoor to the lyrics of Sajeev Naavakam, Rafeeq Ahammed and Rajeev Alunkal.

No.	Song	Lyrics	Singers	Music	Length
1	"Kaattumaakaan Kaarirumbin..." കാട്ടുമാക്കാൻ കാരിരുമ്പിൻ	Sajeev Naavakam	Nikhil Raj	Shine Issai	
2	"Thaalam Puthumazha..." താളം പുതുമഴ	Rafeeq Ahammed	Hariharan, Rimi Tomy	Murali Guruvayoor	5:08
3	"Arayaalum Poothu Thudangi..." അരയാലും പൂത്തു തുടങ്ങി	Sajeev Naavakam	Pradeep Palluruthy	Shine Issai	3:15
4	"Manassinullil Azhakerum..." മനസിന്നുള്ളിൽ അഴകേറും	Rajeev Alunkal	Najim Arshad, Swetha Mohan	Murali Guruvayoor	4:19
5	"Moovanthi Kallum Monthi..." മൂവന്തി കള്ളും മോന്തി	Sajeev Naavakam	Jayaraj Warrier	Shine Issai	3:40
