= Mummy – Save Me =

- Theatrical Poster
- Directed by: Lohith H.
- Written by: Shailesh Raj
- Screenplay by: Lohith H.
- Story by: Lohith H.
- Produced by: K Ravikumar
- Starring: Priyanka Upendra; Yuvina Parthavi
- Cinematography: H. C. Venugopal
- Edited by: C. Ravichandran
- Music by: B. Ajaneesh Loknath
- Production company: KRK Productions
- Distributed by: Horizon Studio
- Release date: 2 December 2016
- Running time: 131 minutes
- Country: India
- Language: Kannada

Mummy – Save Me is a 2016 Indian Kannada language supernatural horror film starring Priyanka Upendra, written and directed by Lohith H. The film is produced by K Ravikumar under KRK Productions and distributed by Horizon Studio. The film was released to positive reviews. The film was dubbed in Telugu and Tamil as Chinnari and Mummy - Save Me , respectively.

== Plot ==
Priya (Priyanka Upendra), a seven-month pregnant widow, and her six-year-old daughter Kriya (Yuvina Parthavi) move from Bangalore to Goa after the death of her husband (Kriya's father). They move to a large villa, but the family start to experience strange things shortly after the move. Kriya is badly affected by her father's death. He bought her a doll as gift for her before dying. Kriya starts to speak with the doll and considers it as her friend. Priya is grief-stricken and depressed due to her husband's death, and as a result of the loss, she is unable to spend time with Kriya. Kriya herself starts to become stubborn, and gets sad and lonely as her mother is not spending quality time with her.

One day, Kriya sees a ghost for the first time and gets scared. After crying and shouting, she eventually befriends the ghost, and is seen speaking to it. Seeing Kriya speaking alone and due to her behavior, Priya becomes tense and concerned, and consults a doctor. The doctor suggests to Priya to spend time with Kriya. She and Kriya spend some time together, they go out and enjoy each other's company for the first time since her husband's passing. Priya experiences the same phenomena as Kriya, she sees the ghost.

One day, the doctor, whom Priya consulted, calls her and informs that her daughter Kriya is speaking with someone whom no one except Kriya can see. The doctor then sends a priest to Priya's villa. The same day, Priya gets hurt and even Kriya gets hurt. Their relatives get the mother and daughter to hospital, where the priest comes to meet Priya, and tells them the story behind the ghost.

The ghost's name is Kumari, a former orphan who had married a rich man and was happy with him. Even after eight years of marriage, Kumari was not blessed with a baby, so her in-laws and elders decided and arranged her husband to marry another woman. Kumari was devastated by the news of divorce, but soon she got pregnant. When Kumari was seven months pregnant with their first child, she and her husband decided to visit a temple. While coming back home, they meet with an accident, and they both die. Kumari always wanted a child; however, due to the accident that took her, her husband, and her baby, her wish was incomplete. As a result, she became an evil spirit and has since roamed around the road where her demise had occurred. Knowing about Kumari's wicked nature, a woman from Kerala captured Kumari and tied her in the forest. After 48 years, a young boy got possessed by Kumari and he started to behave like her. The boy's mother called a pandit who captured the ghost but it was unsuccessful, because the pandit died and the spirit of Kumari entered the doll which is now in Kriya's possession.

Kumari forcefully takes Kriya to the villa from hospital. Priya and others also go into the villa, where everyone gets ambushed by the vengeful spirit of Kumari. Kumari starts to drag Kriya to take her with her to the afterlife as the child she longed to have, but Priya doesn't allow her to do so. Priya begs her to leave her child, and even Kriya says that she wants to stay with her mother and doesn't like Kumari at all. Hearing this, Kumari leaves Kriya's hand, and her spirit transforms into ash.

Six months later, Kriya leaves for school and bids farewell to her mother and baby sibling. While leaving the house, Kriya is playing with Kumari again.

== Cast ==
- Priyanka Upendra as Priya
- Yuvina Parthavi as Kriya
- Madhusudan as Father Mosis
- Aishwarya Shindogi as Sneha
- Vatsala Mohan as Vatsala
- Sandeep as John
- Sidlingu Sridhar as James

== Production ==
The film was launched on 12 November coinciding with Priyanka Upendra's birthday. After director Lohith could not find any actor for the role of a child artist after auditioning more than 40 kids, H. C. Venugopal suggested Yuvina Parthavi, who starred in Abhimanyu (2014), for which he worked as the cinematographer.

== Reception ==
A critic from The New Indian Express wrote that "On the whole, Mummy- Save Me does scare and it could offer a tip or two for horror aficionados who plan to hit the screens with their version". A critic from The Times of India rated the film four out of five stars and wrote that "Go ahead and watch this film if you're keen on a ride that has enough chills and thrills to keep you on the edge of your seat".
