= Dolls (2013 film) =

- Film poster
- Directed by: Shalil Kallur
- Produced by: MJS Media Madhusoodhanan
- Starring: John; Parvatii Nair; Jyothi Krishna
- Cinematography: Anil Vadakkekkara
- Edited by: V. T. Sreejith
- Music by: Murali Guruvayoor
- Production company: MJS Media
- Release date: 15 March 2013
- Country: India
- Language: Malayalam

Dolls is a 2013 Malayalam drama film directed by Shalil Kallur. It stars John, Parvatii Nair and Jyothi Krishna in the lead roles. The film opened to negative reviews in March 2013.

== Cast ==
- John as Dr. Dilip
- Jyothi Krishna as Dr. Remya
- Bijukuttan as Viswambaran
- Sadiq as Paramu Paniker
- Subi Suresh as Sisily Perera
- Rahul Ravi as Dr.Anoop (antagonist)
- Geetha Vijayan
- Parvathy Nair as Dr.Maya
- Indrans as Christefer Perera
- Babu Namboothiri as Pisharadi
- Kalasala Babu as Justice. Raghava Kaimal
- Santhosh as Santhosh Varma
- Rudraksh
- Jagannatha Varma
- Shanavas
- Shenby
- Shruti Nair
- Maria John
- Mahima
- Omana Ouseph

== Production ==
Shalil Kallur signed up models Shruti Nair and Maria John, who had participated in the Miss Kerala pageant, to appear in the film. However, after canning a few scenes, John left the project complaining that Kallur had misled her about the role in the film.
