= Salmon 3D =

3D film by Shalil Kallur

- Film poster
- Directed by: Shalil Kallur
- Written by: Shalil Kallur
- Produced by: MJS Media; Shaju Thomas; Jose D.Pekkattil; Joyson D.Pekkattil; Key Entertainments; Bose Kurian
- Starring: Vijay Yesudas; Jonita Doda; Neha Saxena; Rajiv Pillai; Shiyas Kareem; Minakshi Jaiswal; Tanvi Kishore; Basheer Bashi; Shalil Kallur
- Cinematography: Rahul Menon
- Edited by: Shyam Sasidharan
- Music by: Sreejith Edavana
- Distributed by: MJS Media
- Release date: 30 June 2023
- Country: India
- Language: Tamil

Salmon 3D is a 2023 Indian Tamil language 3D horror film written and directed by Shalil Kallur. The film stars Vijay Yesudas along with Jonita Doda, Rajiv Pillai, and Tanvi Kishore in important characters.

The film began principal photography on 23 November 2019, and was shot mainly in Kerala, Dubai and Malaysia. The film was a box office failure.

== Plot ==
Sarfarosh, his wife Sameera and their daughter Shazaan are settled in Dubai. A murder happens at a party that spoils every dream, but a power that knows the truth is the only hope of Sarfarosh.

== Cast ==
- Vijay Yesudas as Sarfarosh
- Jonita Doda as Sameera
- Rajeev Pillai as Jasim aka Govind Raj
- Neha Saxena as Kaala Bhairavi
- Dhruvanth as Fayaz
- Shiyas Kareem as Ramdev
- Minakshi Jaiswal as Vaiga
- Tanvi Kishore as Ancy
- Basheer Bashi as Steve
- Shalil Kallur as Nandan
- Anju Nair as Shima
- Deva Nandha as Avani
- Jabir Muhammed as Hashim from Abudhabi
- Shini Ambalathodi
- Bismi Navas as Shamma
- Pattalam Sunny
- Seethu
- Vinu Abraham
- Nazreen Nazeer
- Darshini
- Naveen Illath
- Sangeetha Vipul
- Rashid
- Jyothi Chandran
- Jeremy Jacob
- Baby Hena
- Alim Ziyan
- Baby Devananda as Sheza
- Sumesh Mukhathala
- Zinaaj
- Razak
- Francis
- Premi Viswanath as Mariya from Manjeri

== Production ==
Hyderabad based Key Entertainments, ventures into movies with the ₹150 million production Salmon, and the film shot in 3D is made in Tamil and dubbed in 6 Indian regional languages with a host of newcomers and noticed actors. PVR Cinemas has been assigned as the distributor of the film targeting an international release. Shyam Sasidharan, who has worked for Porinju Mariam Jose and Lailaa O Lailaa was signed as the editor with Rahul Menon as the cinematographer. Playback singer Vijay Yesudas, who has played lead roles in Avan, Padaiveeran and negative role in Maari, was signed to play the lead role. Basheer Bashi, Shiyas Kareem and Jabir Muhammed were offered important roles. Multi-linguist actress Tanvi Kishore was also signed for the film, that has a total number of 42 songs including all the 7 languages.

A special team of 3D technicians, Jeemon Pullely (3D stereoscopic director) and Vinex Varghese (3D stereoscopic supervisor) was assigned to work in the film with Folea studio Pvt ltd providing the 3D Camera and crew. Folea Film has been assigned as 3D stereoscopic VFX studio, while Shijin Hutton and Abhishek Nair was signed as sound designers with Jeemon K.Paily as stereographer of the film.

== Soundtrack ==
The music was composed by Sreejith Edavana. A single titled "Kaadhal En Kaviye" rendered by Sid Sriram released on 14 February 2021 and became popular.

Tamil Tracklist
| No. | Title | Singer(s) | Length |
|---|---|---|---|
| 1. | "Kaadhal En Kaviye" | Sid Sriram | 5:12 |
| 2. | "Raavil Viriyum" | Sithara, Sooraj Santhosh | 5:02 |
| 3. | "Nee Pogum" | Vijay Yesudas | 3:53 |

== Release ==
The film was released on 30 June 2023.

== Reception ==
A critic from Samayam wrote that "Rahul Menon and S Selvakumar's camerawork, Sid Sriram's singing and special effects are the standout experiences of Salmon".
