= Nithya Ram =

Indian actress

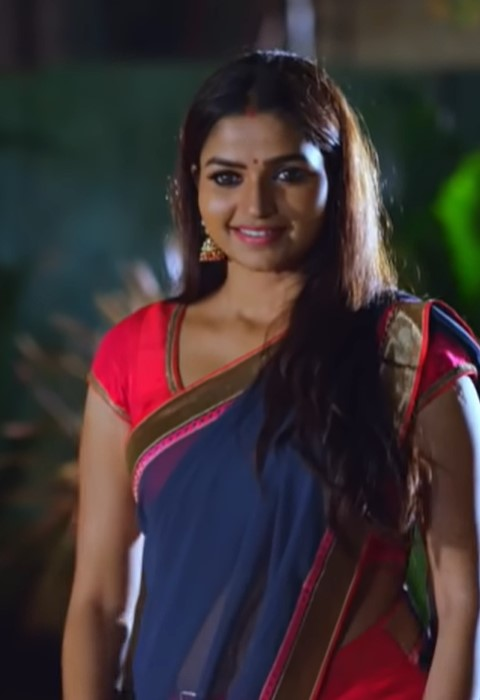
- Nithya in a scene from Nandini
- Occupation: Actress
- Years active: 2010–2019; 2023–present
- Known for: Nandini; Anna
- Relatives: Rachita Ram (sister)

Nithya Ram is an Indian actress who works in Tamil, Kannada, and Telugu soap operas with few Kannada and Malayalam films. She is the elder sister of Kannada film actress Rachita Ram. Known for her act in the Tamil TV series Nandini.

== Early life and career ==
Nithya Ram comes from a family of artists with her father K. S. Ramu and sister Rachita Ram being classical dancers themselves, and the latter has since appeared in films. Nithya is a trained classical dancer from Welight Academy as well. She holds a graduate degree in biotechnology and worked for some time, but her "dream of becoming a heroine never died."

Nithya started her career as an actress with a Kannada television show opera Benkiyalli Aralida Hoovu, which aired on Zee Kannada, that co-starred her sister as well. She went on to appear in other Kannada shows such as Karpoorada Gombe, Rajkumari and Eradu Kanasu. Following this, she worked in one Telugu soap opera, i. e., Muddhu Bidda. After that, she had been signed for a film opposite Diganth, which however failed to take off. In 2014, she was signed to play a lead role in Muddu Manase opposite Aru Gowda. Around the time, she signed to her second soap opera in Telugu, Amma Naa Kodala. Later, She also played the lead role in the Tamil superhit television serial Nandini.

== Television ==
List of Nithya Ram television credits
Year	Series	Role	Language	Notes
2010	Benkiyalli Aralida Hoovu	Malli	Kannada	Debut serial
2012–2013	Aval	Shalini	Tamil	Tamil debut
2013	Karpoorada Gombe	Shravani	Kannada	
2013	Rajkumari	Rajakumari	Kannada	
2012–2014	Muddu Bidda	Geetha/Sangeetha	Telugu	Dual role & First Telugu serial
2014–2017	Amma Naa Kodala	Madhumita chaitu	Telugu	
2015	Eradu Kanasu		Kannada	
2016	Girija Kalyana	Parvathi	Kannada	Debut in Mythological TV series
2017–2018	Nandini	Nandini and Ganga- Dual Role (Season 1)	Tamil-Kannada	Won Best Actress and Best Jodi Sun Kudumbam Awards 2018
2017–2018	Killadi Kids	Judge	Kannada	Udaya TV
2017–2018	Asathal Chutties	Judge	Tamil	Sun TV
2018	Saavale Samali	Contestant	Tamil	Sun TV
2018	Savalige Sye	Anchor	Kannada	Udaya TV
2018	Nandhini Kudumbam	Herself	Tamil	special show on Sun TV for Nandini series celebration
2018	Masala Cafe	Judge	Tamil	Sun Life program
2019	Lakshmi Stores	DC Nithya	Tamil	Extended Cameo
2019	Nandini 2	Nandini, Ganga and Janani - Triple role (Season 2)	Kannada	Udaya TV
2023–2026	Anna	Bharani Shanmugam	Tamil	Zee Tamil
2024–present	Shanthi Nivasa	Shanthi and Archana - Dual Roles	Kannada	Udaya TV
2026–present	Rajnandini	Ganga - Cameo appearance	Hindi	Sun Neo

=== Films ===
List of Nithya Ram film credits
Year	Film	Role	Language	Notes
2015	Muddu Manase	Poorvi	Kannada	Debut Kannada film
2022	Kaypakka	Seetha	Malayalam	

== See also ==
- List of Indian film actresses
- List of Tamil film actresses
- List of Indian television actresses
