= Yuvina Parthavi =

Indian child actress (born 2008)

- Occupation: Actress
- Years active: 2011–present

Yuvina Parthavi born 16th July 2008 is an Indian actress who has appeared in predominantly Tamil and Kannada films and commercials. She was introduced as a child actress in AVM Productions television serial Uravukku Kai Koduppom (2011), before making a breakthrough in films portraying a young girl in Mummy – Save Me (2016) and Pushpaka Vimana (2017). She also acted in web series As I'm Suffering From Kadhal.

== Early life and career ==
Born into a Telugu family in Chennai, Yuvina was introduced as a child actress in AVM Productions Tamil-language television serial Uravukku Kai Koduppom (2011) by director Bhuvanesh, who met Yuvina and her father Mahesh while on a tour. Her performance in the serial received acclaim, with producer M. Saravanan noting the success of the serial had "a lot to do with" Yuvina.

In 2013, she started appearing in Tamil films and her role as Nassar's granddaughter in Veeram, where she featured in scenes alongside Ajith Kumar was well received by critics. Subsequently, she was signed on to appear in roles in Linguswamy's production Manjapai where she played a young girl who bonds with an elderly man, as well as in a one scene appearance in AR Murugadoss's Kaththi, playing a girl at the airport cared for by Samantha Ruth Prabhu. The same year, she also played a full-length role in Athithi as a kidnapped child, as well as a pivotal role in Arjun's action drama film Jaihind 2, a multilingual film which marked her Kannada debut. She also starred in other Kannada films such as Mummy – Save Me (2016) and Pushpaka Vimana (2017) as Ramesh Aravind's and Priyanka Upendra's daughter, respectively.

== Filmography ==
Year	Film	Role	Language	Notes
2013	Thirumathi Thamizh	Young Jothi	Tamil	
2013	Ivan Veramathiri	Young Malika	Tamil	
2014	Veeram	Kayalvizhi (Kayal)	Tamil	
2014	Manjapai	Pooja	Tamil	
2014	Athithi	Pavithra Madhiazhagan	Tamil	
2014	Megha	Yuvi	Tamil	
2014	Aranmanai	Servant's Daughter	Tamil	
2014	Kaththi	Ankitha's niece	Tamil	
2014	Abhimanyu	Parvathi	Kannada	Trilingual film
2014	Jaihind 2	Parvathi	Tamil	Trilingual film
2014	Jaihind 2	Parvathi	Telugu	Trilingual film
2015	Kaaki Sattai	Swetha	Tamil	
2015	Iridiyam	Mohan Kumar's daughter	Tamil	
2015	Massu Engira Masilamani	Megha	Tamil	
2015	Strawberry	Anu	Tamil	
2015	Kaki	Ammu	Telugu	
2016	Mr. Mommaga	Anjali	Kannada	
2016	Mummy – Save Me	Kriya	Kannada	
2016	Meow	Shelby's caretaker	Tamil	
2017	Pushpaka Vimana	Young Putta Lakshmi	Kannada	
2017	Adhagappattathu Magajanangalay		Tamil	
2017	Ka Ka Ka: Aabathin Arikuri	Ammu	Tamil	
2018	Sarkar	Sundar Ramasamy's niece	Tamil	
2024	Siren	Malar Thilagavarman	Tamil	
2025	Madha Gaja Raja	Oviya Kalyanasundaram	Tamil	Filmed in 2012 and released after 12 years
2025	Right	Varnika	Tamil	
2026	Aadarsha Kutumbam House No: 47 - AK47	Sampoorna	Telugu	

=== Television ===
Year	Title	Role	Network	Language	Notes	Ref.
2011	Uravukku Kai Koduppom		Kalaignar TV	Tamil		
2012	All In All Alamelu		KTV	Tamil		
2018	Super Mom Season 2	Contestant	Zee Tamil	Tamil	Reality Game Show; Along With Her Mother	
2017	Nandini	Herself	Sun TV	Tamil		
2017	As I'm Suffering From Kadhal	Smrithi	Disney+ Hotstar	Tamil		
2021	Super Mom Reunion	Guest Contestant	Zee Tamil	Tamil	Special Show; Along With Her Mother	
