= Strawberry (film) =

2015 Indian film by Pa. Vijay

- Theatrical release poster
- Directed by: Pa. Vijay
- Written by: Pa. Vijay
- Produced by: Pa. Vijay
- Starring: Pa. Vijay; Samuthirakani; Devayani; Avani Modi; Yuvina Parthavi
- Cinematography: Maara Varman
- Edited by: San Lokesh
- Music by: Taj Noor
- Production company: Vil Makers
- Distributed by: Sri Thenandal Films
- Release date: 11 September 2015
- Running time: 140 minutes
- Country: India
- Language: Tamil

Strawberry is a 2015 Indian Tamil-language comedy horror film produced, written and directed by Pa. Vijay in his directorial debut; he also plays the lead role. The film also stars Avani Modi, Samuthirakani, Yuvina Parthavi, Devayani and Robo Shankar. The soundtrack was composed by Taj Noor. The film was released in theatres on 11 September 2015.

== Plot ==
Saravanan is a taxi driver experience paranormal activities and he talks about the spirit, Anu who died in the school bus accident.

== Cast ==
- Pa. Vijay as Saravanan
- Yuvina Parthavi as Anu
- Avani Modi as Milovina
- Samuthirakani as Aadhiraj
- Devayani as Aadhi's wife
- Joe Malloori as D'Souza
- Robo Shankar as Arnold, Saravanan's companion
- Thambi Ramaiah as Arnold's friend
- Jangiri Madhumitha as D'Sousa's daughter
- Kavithalaya Krishnan as Naidu
- Imman Annachi as teashop owner
- Mayilsamy as Swamiji
- Vettri as Vikram Chand
- Mohammad Javid
- Sarathy Arumugam

== Soundtrack ==
The soundtrack was composed by Taj Noor.

Song title	Singer(s)
"Strawberry"	Siddharth
"Ahh Ohh Isai"	G. V. Prakash Kumar
"Kaiveesum" (Male)	D. Imman, Deepak
"Hai Call Taxi"	Nincy
"Sunday Monday"	A. I. S. Nawfal Raja
"Kaiveesum" (Female)	Uthara Unnikrishnan

== Critical reception ==
Sudhir Srinivasan of The Hindu wrote, "The problem is that the nobility of Vijay's motive isn't really backed by any serious exploration of the business of education. The story may have perhaps germinated from this idea, but the film takes such a long time to get to this point that "lessons" at the end seem like an afterthought — and a manipulative afterthought at that". M Suganth of The Times of India gave the film 2 stars out of 5 and wrote, "Strawberry could have been mildly engaging if only it had released some five years ago. Given the amount of horror films that Tamil movie audiences have been exposed to during this period, the film feels utterly redundant. The filmmaking, too, isn't interesting, and depends on done-to-death cliches — moody skies, pouring rain, tacky visual effects and high-pitched music, supported by bland performances".

Sify wrote, "to be frank, the one-liner of Strawberry is definitely interesting but for an engaging watch, a film needs something called water-tight writing and strong characterizations which the director has sadly missed out! The film is highly amateurish and is unbearable as the director tries to make it a social tear jerker". S Saraswathi of Rediff.com gave 3 out of 5 as well and wrote, "Despite the lack of scary moments, the uninspiring computer graphics and cliché-ridden climax, a decent storyline and some good performances make lyricist Pa Vijay's Strawberry worth a watch". Malini Mannath of The New Indian Express wrote, "Strawberry can be considered as a debutant maker's promising work".
