= Anna (2023 TV series) =

2023 Tamil television series

- Genre: Drama; Action; Romance
- Directed by: A.Durga Saravanan
- Starring: Senthil Kumar; Nithya Ram
- Country of origin: India
- Original language: Tamil
- No. of episodes: 876

Production
- Producers: Anil Sundar; Gugan Manohar
- Cinematography: Kalaivanan
- Editor: Aravind
- Camera setup: Multi-camera
- Running time: 22 minutes
- Production company: Rajammal Creations

Original release
- Network: Zee Tamil
- Release: 22 May 2023 – 18 January 2026

Anna (transl. Elder brother) is an Indian Tamil-language television series produced by Rajammal Creations, starring Senthil Kumar and Nithya Ram. The serial is based on the bond between an elder brother and his four younger sisters.

The show premiered on Zee Tamil on 29 August 2022 and ended with 876 episodes on 18 January 2026. The series is also available on the digital platform Zee5. The final episode aired on Sunday 18 January 2026 at 14:30 for 4 hours and 30 Minutes.

== Plot ==
Shanmugan, a devoted brother, raises his four younger sisters while managing their alcoholic father. His overprotective nature and insistence that marriage take priority blind him to his sisters' own dreams and aspirations.

Meanwhile, Bharani chafes under parental pressure and their disapproval of her relationship with Shanmugan.

The series follows Shanmugan's dual role as caretaker to his sisters and partner to Bharani, while tracing how his sisters navigate their own relationships with parents and in-laws. A romantic subplot also develops between Shanmugan's sister Issaki and Bharani's brother Muthupandi.

== Cast ==
=== Main ===
- Senthil Kumar as:
  - Shanmugam "Anna" Vaikundam: Grocery store owner; Vaikundam and Sudamani's son; Bharani's husband; Rathna, Isakki and Veera's elder brother; Kani's adoptive elder brother. (2023–2026)
  - Dr. Saravanan: Shanmugam's look-alike; Koperundevi's husband (2024)
- Nithya Ram as Dr. Bharani Shanmugam: Soundirapandi and Bhagyam's daughter; Shanmugam's wife; Muthupandi's younger sister and Sivabalan's elder sister. (2023–2026)

=== Recurring ===
- Poovilangu Mohan as Soundirapandi a.k.a. "Soundiram": Pandiyamma's brother; Bhagyam's husband; (2023–2026)
- STP Rosary as Vaikundam: Bhagyam's elder brother; Sudamani's widower; (2023–2026)
- Manjula Reddy as Sudamani Vaikundam: Vaikundam's wife (2023–2024) (dead, Accidentally Killed by Maruthappan)
- Sunitha Srinivasan/ Yalini vinod as Ratna Arivazhagan: A school teacher; Vaikundam and Sudamani's eldest daughter; (2023–2026)
- Vikash Sampath as Arivazhagan: Ratna's second husband (2024–2026)
- VJ Thara / Darsu Sundaram / Gowri Gopan / Suchitra as Inspector Veeralakshmi "Veera" Sivabalan: Vaikundam and Sudamani's second daughter; (2023–2026)
- Abinash as Sivabalan Soundirapandi: Soundirapandi and Bhagyam's younger son; (2023–2026)
- Preetha Suresh as Isakki Muthupandi: Vaikundam and Sudamani's youngest daughter; (2023–2026)
- Sathya SK (2023–2024) / Afsal Hameed K (2024–2026) as Inspector Muthu Pandi a.k.a. "Pandi" Soundirapandi: Soundirapandi and Bhagyam's elder son
- Hema Chinraj as Chellakani "Kani" Vaikundam: Vaikundam and Sudamani's adopted daughter; (2023–2026)
- Sri Latha as Baakkiyam Soundirapandi: Vaikundam's younger sister; Soundirapandi's wife; (2023–2026)
- Srilekha Rajendran as Paandiyammaal: Soundirapandi's elder sister and Vedha's Mother (2023–2025) (dead, Accidentally Killed by Soundirapandi)
- Saravanan as Vettukili: Shanmugam's grocery shop faithful servant (2023–2025)
- Santhosh / Ajay Bharat / Guhan Shanmugam as Venkateshan: Ratna's ex-husband (2023–2025)
- Poppy Master as IPS Vyjayanthi: Gowtham's mother (2025)
- Baashwanth as Gowtham: Vyjayanthi's son; Veera's ex-fiancé (2025)
- Sivan Sreenivasan as Public Prosecutor Sivanandi (2025)
- Sofiya as Senthamarai: Vettukili's wife (2025)
- Syamantha Kiran as Vedhavalli "Vedha": Pandiyamma's Daughter (2025–2026)

=== Others ===
- Parvathy Venkataraman (2024) / Preethi Sharma (2024) as Koperundevi, Saravanan's wife (2024)
- Rhema Ashok as Shanmugam's cousin (2023)
- Hemanth Kumar as Karthi (2023–2024)
- Parthiban as Shanmugham's Uncle
- Eshwar as Maruthappan: Devi's ex-fiancé and Sudamani's killer
- Nalini as Judge
- Vaishnavi Arulmozhi as Veera
- Arun Crizer as Maaran

== Production ==
=== Development ===
It was announced on 10 April 2023 that the series will be released on Zee Tamil.

=== Casting ===
Senthil Kumar was cast in the main role in the serial, making his comeback to Tamil television after Naam Iruvar Namakku Iruvar. Nithya Ram was cast in the female lead role, returning to Tamil television after a sabbatical of four years. Initially, Rithika Tamil Selvi was considered to play the role of the sister Isakki, but she denied and was replaced by actress and dancer Preetha Suresh, who was known for her role in Zee Tamil's Rajini series and as a contestant in Dance Jodi Dance.

Sunitha was cast in another sister role, Rathna. VJ Thara was initially cast as Veeralakshmi, Shanmugam's second sister, but was replaced by Darsu Sundaram on 22 September 2023. However, she also left, resulting in Gowri Gopan playing the role as of April 2024. Actor Santhosh was cast as Venkateshan, Rathna's love interest, but he was replaced by Ajay Bharat in March 2024.

In June 2025, Ramya Balakrishna was cast to play negative lead Shruti. In one week, Ajay and Sree Nithi made a special appearance. In February 2025, Sofiya was cast as Senthamarai.

=== Release ===
The first promo was unveiled on 15 April 2023, featuring Senthil Kumar at the Kavadi Aattam temple.
