= Rahul Ravi =

Indian television actor

- Born: Rahul T Raveendran; 21 May 1989 (age 37); Triprayar, Kerala, India
- Education: St Antonys High School, Pazhuvil; Matha College of Technology , ICFAI
- Occupations: Actor; model; Television Host
- Years active: 2013–present
- Parent(s): Ravi Rami; Kshema

Rahul Ravi is an Indian actor and former model who made his debut in the Malayalam series Ponnambili. He is best known for playing the lead role in the multilingual drama Nandini, thus establishing himself in the South Indian Television industry.

== Biography ==
In 2015, he starred in the Malayalam television serial Ponnambili on Mazhavil Manorama, opposite Malavika Wales, playing the lead role of Haripadmanabhan. The serial became a hit. He then signed on to be a part of the Tamil supernatural television show Nandini headed by Raj Kapoor and produced by Khushbu. He had also hosted the fourth season of popular reality Show D4 Dancer. He married Lakshmi Nair in 2021, and they separated in 2023 due to some personal reasons.

== Filmography ==
Year	Title	Role	Language
2013	Dolls	Dr. Anoop	Malayalam
2013	Oru Indian Pranayakadha	Johan	Malayalam
2014	Dial 1091	Rahul	Malayalam
2016	Kattumakkan	Rahul	Malayalam
2017	Jomonte Suvisheshangal	Tessa's husband	Malayalam
2022	Kaypakka	Surya	Malayalam
2023	Bhagavanth Kesari	Karthik	Telugu
2024	DNA	Parthi	Malayalam
2024	Chethilo Cheyyesi Cheppu Bava	Suresh	Telugu
2025	Odela 2	Venkatesh	Telugu
2025	Premistunnaa		Telugu

=== Television ===
Serials

Year	Title	Role	Network	Language	Notes
2015–2016	Ponnambili	Haripadmanabhan	Mazhavil Manorama	Malayalam	
2017–2018	Nandhini	Arun Rajasekhar	Sun TV; Udaya TV	Tamil; Kannada	Bilingual serial
2019	Nandhini 2	Arun Rajasekhar	Udaya TV	Kannada	Cameo Appearance
2019–2020	Chocolate	Vikram Sethumadhavan / Roshan	Surya TV	Malayalam	
2019–2020	Chocolate	Vikram Sanjay Kumar	Sun TV	Tamil	
2020–2023	Kannana Kanne	Yuvaraj "Yuva" Kodeeshwaran	Sun TV	Tamil	
2021	Abhiyum Naanum	Yuva	Sun TV	Tamil	Special Appearance
2021	Anbe Vaa	Yuva	Sun TV	Tamil	Special Appearance
2021	Kanakanmani	Himself	Surya TV	Malayalam	Special Appearance
2022	Kayal	Yuva	Sun TV	Tamil	Special Appearance
2023	Vontari Gulabi	SS Balu	Gemini TV	Telugu	
2024–present	Marumagal	Prabhu Thillainaathan	Sun TV	Tamil	
2026-present	Rajnandini	Arun	Sun Neo	Hindi	Cameo Appearance

Shows

Year	Title	Role	Network	Language	Notes
2015/2018	Onnum Onnum Moonu	Guest	Mazhavil Manorama	Malayalam	Talk show
2016	Comedy Circus	Celebrity Judge	Mazhavil Manorama	Malayalam	Reality show
2016	Uggram Ujjwalam	Celebrity Judge	Mazhavil Manorama	Malayalam	
2016	D3	Celebrity Judge	Mazhavil Manorama	Malayalam	
2016	Minute To Win It	Contestant	Mazhavil Manorama	Malayalam	Game show
2017	D4 Junior Vs Senior	Host	Mazhavil Manorama	Malayalam	Reality show
2018	Nandhini Kudumbam	Himself	Sun TV	Tamil	Special show
2019	Red FM Malayalam music awards	Host	Surya TV	Malayalam	Award show
2020/2021	Vanakkam Tamizha	Guest	Sun TV	Tamil	
2020	Yaarappa Indha Ponnu Special	Yuvraj "Yuva"	Sun TV	Tamil	
2021	Rowdy Baby	Contestant	Sun TV	Tamil	Along with Lakshmi S Nair
2021	Poova Thalaya	Contestant	Sun TV	Tamil	
2021	Puthande Varuga	Himself	Sun TV	Tamil	
2022	Maathi Yosi	Contestant	Sun TV	Tamil	
2022	Oru Chiri Iru Chiri Bumper Chiri	Celebrity Judge	Mazhavil Manorama	Malayalam	Reality show
2022	Maathi Yosi	Contestant	Sun TV	Tamil	
2022	Maathi Yosi	Contestant	Sun TV	Tamil	
2022	Super Samayal	Contestant	Sun TV	Tamil	Along with Nimeshika
2022	Ullathai Allitha	Yuvraj "Yuva"	Sun TV	Tamil	Deepavali Special Show; Along with Nimeshika
2022	Maathi Yosi	Contestant	Sun TV	Tamil	
2022	Vanakkam Tamizha	Guest	Sun TV	Tamil	
2023	City Pasanga Sutti Ponnuga	Contestant	Sun TV	Tamil	
