= Madan–Harini =

- Occupation: Choreographers
- Years active: 1989–present
- Career
- Dances: Indian classical dance

Madan–Harini is an Indian duo of choreographers consisting of Madan and Harini, who work predominantly in Kannada and Tulu cinema. Having choreographed in over 200 films, the duo is considered among the best in Kannada cinema.

== Personal life and career ==
Madan and Harini, both based in Puttur, Karnataka, came to Bangalore in search for jobs. There, they trained with Rajarathnam Pillai in Indian classical dance and married soon after.

They first worked together as choreographers in films with Aryamba Pattabhi's Naadaswaroopi. They went on to work in popular Kannada films such as America America (1995), Hoomale (1998), Singaaravva (2003), Gaalipata (2008), and Tulu films Bangarda Kural (2012) and Rickshaw Driver (2013).

== Films ==
- America America (1995)
- Akka (1997)
- Hoomale (1998)
- Nanna Preethiya Hudugi (2001)
- Neela (2001)
- Singaaravva (2003)
- Preethi Prema Pranaya (2003)
- Gaalipata (2008)
- Auto (2009)
- Kalgejje (2011)
- Karanika Shishu (2012)
- Bangarda Kural (2012)
- Rickshaw Driver (2013)
- Sweety Nanna Jodi (2013)
- Ambareesha (2014)
- Drishya (2014)
- Soombe (2015)
- Mythri (2015)
- Super Marmaye (2015)
