= Bhatkuli =

Coordinates: 20.905644°N 77.603302°E

Bhatakuli is a town and a taluka in Amravati subdivision of Amravati district in Amravati revenue Division in the Berar region in the state of Maharashtra, India. Bhatkuli has an ancient shiv temple for Vishwamitra, Waki Raipur, Nirul Gangamai, Himmatpur, Purna Nagar, Marki, Makarampur, Ashti, Hathkheda, Kholapur, Chinchkhed, Dhangarkhed, Wathoda Shukleshwar, sayat and many more villages. Also available various ancient temple like Ram mandir, Jain mandir etc.

== Demographics ==
As per Indian government census 2011, the population was 113109.

Year	Male	Female	Total Population	Change	Religion (%)							
Year	Male	Female	Total Population	Change	Hindu	Muslim	Christian	Sikhs	Buddhist	Jain	Other religions and persuasions	Religion not stated
2001	55773	52850	108623	-	63.113	15.561	0.221	0.084	20.645	0.312	0.029	0.035
2011	58015	55094	113109	4.130	63.281	15.816	0.131	0.012	20.435	0.191	0.004	0.130
