= Rinku Ghosh =

Indian film and television actress

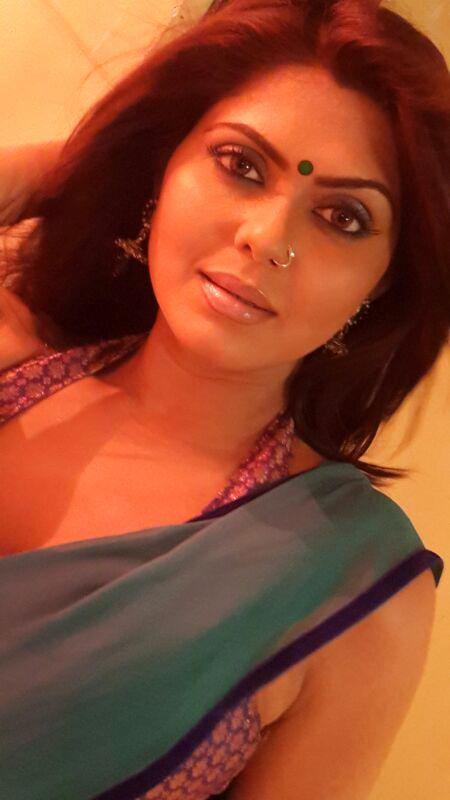
- Occupation: Actress
- Years active: 2000–present
- Notable work: Durgesh Nandini, Pammi Pyarelal, Daroga Babu I Love You, Bidai, Balidan, Saat Saheliya, Ganga Jamuna Saraswati.
- Spouse: Amit Dutta Roy (m. 2015)

Rinku Ghosh is an Indian television and film actress. She is known for her work in the T.V. serial Durgesh Nandini (2007) and films such as Daroga Babu I Love You (2004), Bidai (2008) and Balidaan (2009). She has primarily performed in Hindi and Bhojpuri films. In 2010, The Hindu stated that Ghosh (along with Antara Biswas) was the most sought after actress in the Bhojpuri film industry.

== Career ==
=== Television serials ===
Rinku Ghosh's first television role was on the serial Durgesh Nandinii as a lead actress which was telecast on Sony TV in 2007. She was next seen in Mohe Rang De as the main antagonist. She was also known for her performance in Ek Safar Aisa Kabhi Socha Na Tha in 2009. In 2012, she appeared in Dhaniya Ka Thana which was aired on Anjan TV. In 2013, she played the role of Mohini Faujdar in the sitcom Mrs. Pammi Pyarelal on Colors TV and in Imtihaan in 2010. Later in 2018 she appeared as a celebrity judge for the show Big Memsaab on Big Ganga Channel and in 2021, she was a celebrity judge for Memsaab No 1 which was telecast on Zee Ganga.

== Television ==
Year	Serial	Role	Channel
2007	Durgesh Nandinii	Main title role	Sony TV
2008	Mohe Rang De	Main antagonist	Colors TV
2009	Ek Safar Aisa Kabhi Socha Na Tha	Central Character	Sony TV
2010	Imtihaan	Central Character	Mahua Plus
2012	Dhaniya Ka Thana		Anjan TV
2013	Mrs. Pammi Pyarelal	Mohini Faujdar	Colors TV
2014	Crime Patrol	Abhilasa Ballroom	Sony TV
2018	BIG Memsaab	Celebrity Judge	Big Ganga
2021	Memsaab No. 1	Celebrity Judge	Zee Ganga
2023	Junooniyatt	Maheeb Mehta	Colors TV
2024	Anokhaa Bandhan	Sadhna Mishra	Dangal TV
2026	Noyontara	Mahamaya	Colors TV
2026–present	Yeh Fitoor Tera	Neeta Sanjeev Saxena	Star Plus

== Filmography ==
Rinku Ghosh made her film debut in the 2000 Bengali film Jai Maa Durga, in which she was cast opposite Deboshree Roy, Arun Govil and Abhishek Chatterjee. She made her Telugu debut in Raave Na Chaliya with Sai Kiran as a co-actor in 2001. In 2002, she was seen in a Hindi film Bharat Bhagya Vidhata (as Sapna). The year 2003 saw her multiple film releases such as Hindi film Tumse Milke Wrong Number and Koi Hai. She did her first Bhojpuri Motion Picture in the film Suhagan Bana Sajna Hamaar in 2004. In 2005, she worked in the Hindi film titled Mumbai Godfather. She then appeared in Daroga Babu I Love You, "Balidaan", "Saat Saheliyan", "Rakhwala", and "Nagina".

Key
†	Denotes films that have not yet been released

Year	Title	Co-Actor	Language
2000	Jai Maa Durga	Deboshree Roy, Arun Govil, Abhishek Chatterjee	Bengali
2001	Raave Naa Chaliya	Sai Kiran	Telugu
2002	Bharat Bhagya Vidhata	Shatrughan Sinha, Jaya Prada, Chandrachur Singh, Puru Raaj Kumar	Hindi
2003	Rakta Bandhan		
2003	Tumse Milke Wrong Number	Rakesh Bapat, Vrajesh Hirjee	Hindi
2003	Koi Hai	Aman Verma	Hindi
2004	Jibon Yudh/Agun Jalbe	Amit Hasan Amin Khan Rituparna Sengupta	Bengali India Bangladesh Joint Production Movie
2004	Suhagan Bana Da Sajana Hamar	Ravi Kishan, Avinash Wadhawan	Bhojpuri
2005	Chalak		
2005	Daroga Babu I Love You	Manoj Tiwari	Bhojpuri
2005	Mumbai Godfather	Seema Biswas, Govind Namdev	Hindi
2006	Hamar Gharwali	Ravi Kishan	Bhojpuri
2006	Suhaag	Krushna Abhishek	Bhojpuri
2006	Saugandh	Manoj Tiwari	Bhojpuri
2006	De Da Piritiya Udhaar	Chhotu Chhaliya	Bhojpuri
2007	Pinjrewali Muniya	Ravi Kishan	Bhojpuri
2007	Sajanwa Tohre Khatir	Ravi Kishan	Bhojpuri
2007	Akhiya Ladiye Gayi	Vinay Anand	Bhojpuri
2007	Uga Ho Suraj Dev Arag Ke Bhail Ber	Vinay Anand	Bhojpuri
2008	Bidaai	Ravi Kishan	Bhojpuri
2008	Hum Bahubali	Ravi Kishan, Dinesh Lal Yadav	Bhojpuri
2009	Balidaan	Ravi Kishan	Bhojpuri
2009	Laal Chunariya Wali	Vinay Anand	Bhojpuri
2009	Kishan Arjun	Anuj Sharma, Gaurav Ghai	Bhojpuri
2010	Gath Bandhan Pyar Ke	Pawan Singh	Bhojpuri
2010	Tu Hi Mor Balma	Pravesh Lal, Manoj Singh Tiger, Arvind Akela Kallu	Bhojpuri
2010	Saat Saheliyan	Dinesh Lal Yadav	Bhojpuri
2010	Mrityunjay	Dinesh Lal Yadav	Bhojpuri
2010	Gathbandan Pyar Ke		Bhojpuri
2010	Kehu Hamse Jeet Na Payi	Ravi Kishan, Manoj Tiwari	Bhojpuri
2010	Satyamev Jayate		Bhojpuri
2011	Aakhari Rasta	Dinesh Lal Yadav	Bhojpuri
2011	Dushmani	Dinesh Lal Yadav, Biraj Bhatta	Bhojpuri
2011	Saiya Driver Biwi Khalashi	Anuj Gupta	Bhojpuri
2012	Khoon Bhari Mang	Pakkhi Hegde, Monalisa	Bhojpuri
2012	Andha Kanoon	Manoj Tiwari	Bhojpuri
2012	Gobar Singh	Manoj Tiwari	Bhojpur]
2012	Bhaiya Hamar Dayavan	Manoj Tiwari, Shubham Tiwari	Bhojpuri
2012	Naagin Bani Suhagan		
2013	Saali Badi Sataweli	Ravi Kishan, Rani Chatterjee	Bhojpuri
2013	Rakhwala	Dinesh Lal Yadav	Bhojpuri
2013	Jeena Teri Gali Main	Pradeep Pandey, Sushil Singh	Bhojpuri
2013	Jai Maa Maihar Wali		Bhojpuri
2013	E Kaisan Pratha	Biraj Bhatta	Bhojpuri
2013	Kotha Jaha Pyar Bikela	Pawan Jha	Bhojpur
2014	Nagina	Pradeep Pandey, Kajal Raghwani, Sambhavna Seth	Bhojpuri
2014	Khoon Bhari Mang	Pakkhi Hegde	Bhojpuri
2015	Aurat Khilona Nahi	Manoj Tiwari	Bhojpuri
2015	Kahiya Biyaah Bola Karba	Alok Kumar, Umesh Singh	Bhojpuri
2015	Chhora Ganga Kinare Wala		
2015	Pyar Ke Bandhan		
2017	Ganga Jamuna Saraswati	Manoj Tiwari, Ravi Kishan, Dinesh Lal Yadav, Rani Chatterjee, Pakkhi Hegde	Bhojpuri
2022	Navratra †	Yash Kumar	Bhojpuri
2022	Ghar Ki Aangan Laxmi †	Aditya Ojha & Sanchita Banerjee	Bhojpuri
2023	Devrani Jethani	Kajal Raghwani & Dev Singh	Bhojpuri
2023	Aangan Ki Lakshmi †	Kunal Singh; Rinku Ghosh	Bhojpuri
2024	Nanad	Kajal Raghwani & Dev Singh	Bhojpuri
2024	Ladies Special†	Dev Singh	Bhojpuri
2025	Bhabhi ji Ghar Pe Hai (as Bhauji Hamar Ghar pe badi)	Dev Singh & Sanchita Banerjee	Bhojpuri

== Special appearance ==
Year	Film	Co-Actors	Language
2009	Pyar Bina Chain Kaha Re	Pawan Singh, Smrity Sinha	Bhojpuri
2013	Himmatwala	Ajay Devgn, Tamannaah, Paresh Rawal, Mahesh Manjrekar, Leena Jumani, Adhyayan Suman, Zarina Wahab, Anil Dhawan	Hindi
2014	Villen Ek Prem Kahani	Awdhesh Mishra	Bhojpuri
2014	Katta Tanal Dupatta Par	Ravi Kishan, Rakhi Sawant, Subhi Sharma, Anjana Singh	Bhojpuri
2015	Hathiyar	Biraj Bhatta	Bhojpuri
2015	Chhora Ganga Kinare Wala	Pradeep Pandey, Vinay Anand	Bhojpuri
2022	Inspector Dhakad Singh †	Yash Kumar	Bhojpuri

== Web series ==
Rinku Ghosh stars in the Hindi web series Patra Petika in 2022.

Year	Film	Language
2022	Patra Petika	Hindi

== Awards and nominations ==
Rinku Ghosh won the Best Actress Award in 2008 for the film Bidai in the Fourth Bhojpuri Film Awards, among other awards for the same role. In the same year she was nominated for the Critics Award for Durgesh Nandini in the Indian Television Academy Awards. In the Bhojpuri Film Awards, she won Best Actress for Balidan in 2009.

Ceremony	Category	Year	Film	Result
4th Bhojpuri Film Awards	Best Actress	2008	Bidai	Won
Indian Television Academy Awards	Critics Award	2008	Durgeshnandini	Nominated
Bhojpuri Film Awards	Best Actress	2009	Balidan	Won
Aap ki Awaaj Press Media Award	Best Film Actress	2009	Bidaai	Won
1st Bhojpuri City Cine Awards	Best Female Actor	2011		Won
Aap ki Awaaj Press Media Award	Best Excellent Actress	2012	Dushmani	Won
6th Vishv Bhojpuri Sammelan Awards	Sharvshreshtha Classical Abhinetri Award	2012		Won
Aap ki Awaaj	Best Actress	2013	Tu Hi Mor Baalma	Won
EME Award	Best Actress	2013	Outstanding Contribution to Regional Films	Won
5th Newsmakers Achievers Awards	Best Bhojpuri Actress	2014		Won
Green Cinema Awards	Best Bhojpuri Actress	2024	Devrani Jethani	Won

== See also ==
- List of Bhojpuri cinema actresses
