= List of Bhojpuri actresses =

This is a list of notable actresses who have played key roles in the Bhojpuri cinema, primarily based in Bihar.

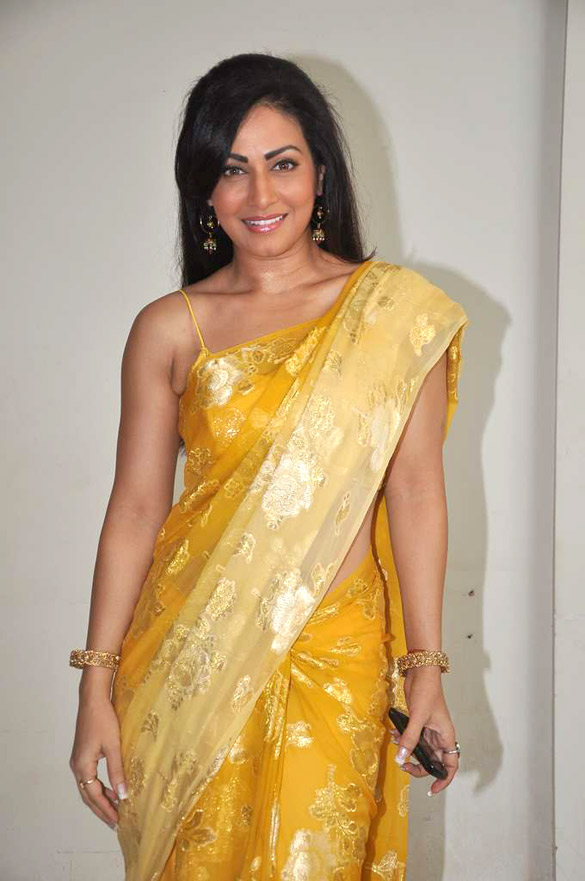
2000s: Pakkhi Hegde

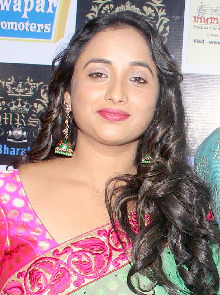
2000s: Rani Chatterjee

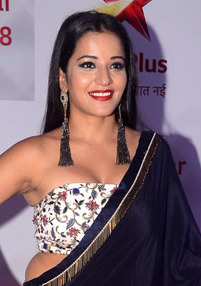
2000s: Antara Biswas

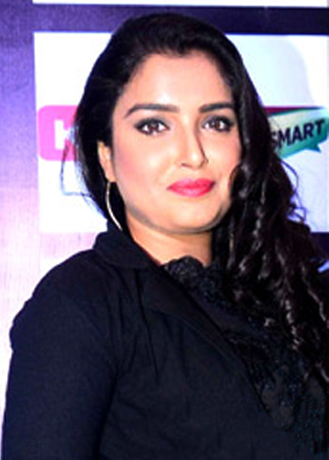
2010s: Amrapali Dubey

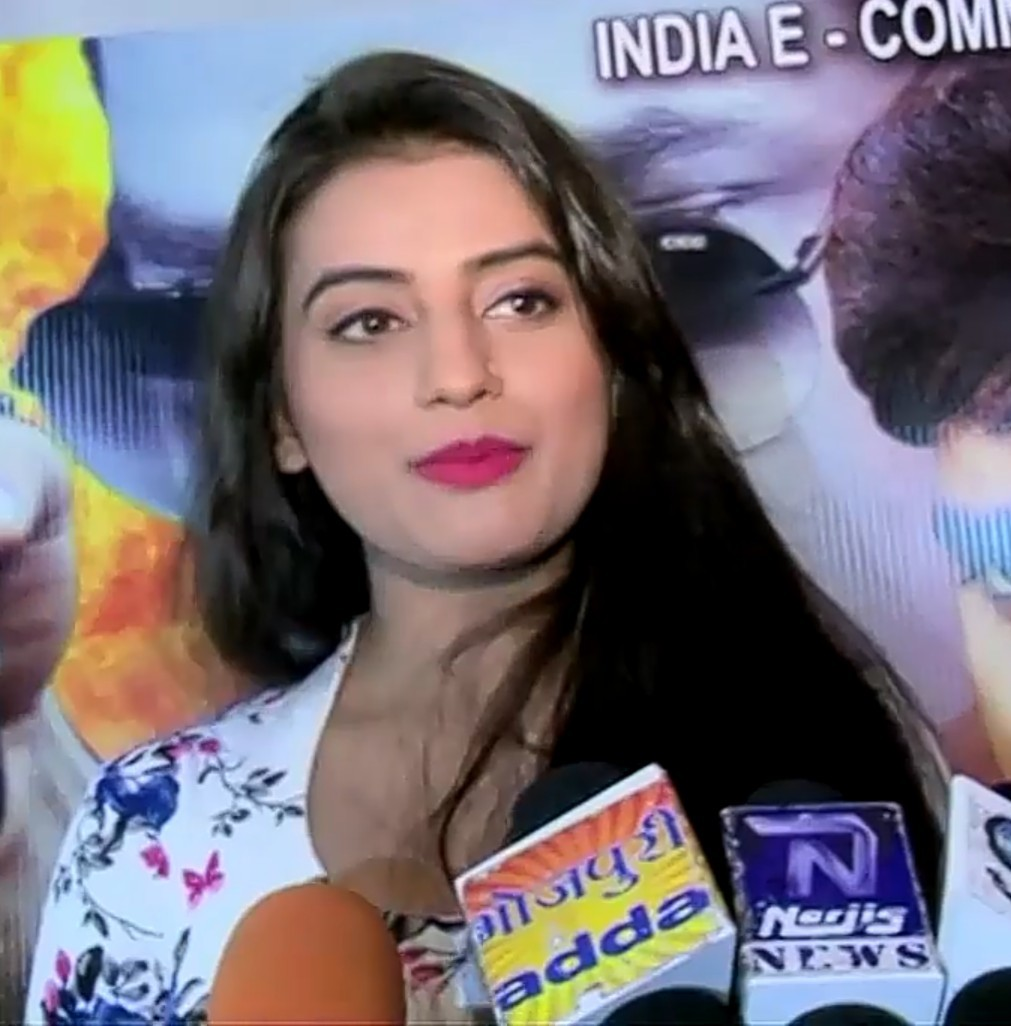
2010s: Akshara Singh

== A ==
- Archana Prajapati
- Akshara Singh
- Amrapali Dubey
- Anjana Singh
- Antara Biswas
- Aruna Irani
- Aarti Puri
- Abhinayashree

== B ==
- Bhagyashree
- Bhumika Chawla
- Bela Bose

== D ==
- Deepa garhwal

== E ==
- Eenu Shree

== H ==
- Hema Malini
- Helen
- Harshika Poonacha

== J ==
- Jaya Bachchan
- Jayshree T.
- Juhi Chawla

== K ==
- Kajal Nishad
- Kajal Raghwani
- Kumkum

== L ==
- Leela Mishra
- Laxmi Chhaya

== M ==
- Madhu Sharma
- Meghashree

== N ==
- Nagma
- Neeta Dhungana
- Nidhi Jha
- Nitu Chandra
- Neelam Giri

== P ==
- Pakkhi Hegde
- Poonam Dubey
- Payal Rohatgi
- Padma Khanna
- Prema Narayan

== R ==
- Raksha Gupta
- Ramya Sri
- Rashami Desai
- Rambha
- Rani Chatterjee
- Rati Agnihotri
- Rinku Ghosh
- Raai Laxmi

== S ==
- Sambhavna Seth
- Sanchita Banerjee
- Shilpa Shetty
- Sheela Sharma
- Sharda Sinha
- Smrity Sinha
- Shweta Tiwari
- Sadhana Singh
- Saadhika Randhawa
- Swati Sen
- Swati Verma
- Shubhi Sharma
- Seema Singh
- Sharbani Mukherjee
- Sulochana Chatterjee
- Sonalika Prasad

== T ==
- Tun Tun
- Tanushree Chatterjee

== U ==
- Urvashi Chaudhary

== Y ==
- Yamini Singh

== See also ==
- Bhojpuri cinema
- List of Indian film actresses
- List of Bhojpuri films
