= Murder of Kannagi and Murugesan =

2003 honor killings in Tamil Nadu, India

- Date: July 7, 2003
- Location: Puthukkooraippettai village,Cuddalore district, Tamil Nadu, India
- Type: Murder, Honor killing
- Cause: Inter-caste marriage
- Convicted: Maruthupandian, C Duraisamy, 8 others
- Convictions: Murder
- Sentence: Life imprisonment

The murder of Kannagi and Murugesan took place in the South Indian state of Tamil Nadu. Kannagi and Murugesan were murdered in an honor killing as Kannagi, a Vanniyar, had married Murugesan, a Dalit. The killing was done by Kannagi's relatives.

== Background ==
Kannagi and Murugesan both hailed from the Puthukkooraippettai village in Cuddalore district, Tamil Nadu. Kannagi had done her B.com and Murugesan was a chemical engineer. Kannagi came from the dominant Vanniyar community while Murugesan belonged to the Dalit community. Kannagi and Murugesan got married on May 5, 2003, against the wishes of Kannagi's parents.

== Murder ==
Kannagi and Murugesan were forced to drink poison in full public view on July 7, 2003, by Kannagi's brother Maruthupandian and other relatives. Later the bodies were burnt.Madras High court transferred the case to the Central Bureau of Investigation on appeal from Murugesan's father after the state police botched the case.

== Court proceedings ==
Cuddalore special court sentenced Maruthupandian to death and sentenced life imprisonment to 12 others including a serving inspector and a retired DSP. Later on appeal the Madras High court commuted the death sentence of Maruthupandian to life imprisonment and upheld the convictions and sentences 9 others including Kannagi's father C Duraisamy .

The Supreme Court of India on 28 April 2025 confirmed the convictions in the Kannagi-Murugesan honour killing case from Tamil Nadu.

A bench comprising Justice Sudhanshu Dhulia and Justice PK Mishra dismissed the appeals filed by eight convicts challenging the Madras High Court's 2022 judgment, which upheld the sentences of life imprisonment awarded to them.
