= Murder of Kongara Nagamani =

Honor killing in India

- Date: December 2, 2024
- Location: Ibrahimpatnam, Hyderabad, Telangana, India
- Type: Murder, Honor killing
- Cause: Inter-caste marriage

Kongara Nagamani was murdered in an honor killing after she had married a Dalit. The murder took place in the South Indian state of Telangana. Her brother surrendered to the police and was charged with her murder.

== Background ==
Kongara Nagamani was a police constable with the Hayathnagar Police Station, Hyderabad. She had married Srikkanth, a dalit with whom she had studied in the same school and had known for 10 years.

== Death ==
Just three weeks after their wedding, her brother, Parmesh, reported killing her when he surrendered to the police, who then charged him with murder.
