= Murder of Gokulraj =

2015 murder in India

- Date: June 23, 2015
- Location: Pallipalayam, Namakkal district, Tamil Nadu, India
- Type: Murder, Honor killing
- Cause: Inter-caste marriage
- Convicted: Yuvaraj and 7 others
- Convictions: Murder
- Sentence: Life imprisonment

Gokulraj was kidnapped on June 23, 2015 and murdered in Tiruchengode, Namakkal, Tamil Nadu. Gokularaj, a Dalit, Gokularaj was murdered in an honor killing by Yuvaraj and others.

Vishnupriya a Deputy Superintendent of Police in Tiruchengode, Namakkal district committed suicide. She was investigating the murder case of Gokulraj. It is alleged that she committed suicide due to stress from the higher officials of the police in this case. DMK, Congress, and Liberation Tigers of Tamil Nadu are protesting for a CBI probe into the case. However, Tamil Nadu Chief Minister J. Jayalalithaa announced in the Legislative Assembly that there is no need for a CBI probe and that the police will investigate.

Vishnupriya's police friend and Keezhakkarai Deputy Superintendent of Police Maheshwari said, "Honest people are treated poorly by higher authorities. The police can do whatever they want; whatever they want will happen" (September 20, 2015 - Tamil The Hindu). She alleged that higher authorities pressured Vishnupriya in the Gokulraj murder case and pressured her to arrest unrelated people and charge them under the Prevention of Gangsters Act.

== Background ==
Gokulraj, an engineering student, was abducted on June 23, 2015 from the Arthanareeswarar temple in Tiruchengode where he was visiting, along with his friend Swathi, by Yuvaraj and others. Yuvaraj ran a network which would work towards preventing inter-caste marriages, especially between Gounder women and men of lowered castes. Gokulraj's headless body was found at the railway tracks in Pallipalayam.

== Court proceedings ==
Madras High Court upheld the life imprisonment on Yuvaraj and 7 others.
