= Rakhwala =

Rakhwala may refer to:

- Rakhwala (1971 film), an Indian Hindi-language musical film
- Rakhwala (1989 film), an Indian Hindi-language film by K. Muralimohana Rao
- Rakhwala (2013 film), an Indian Bhojpuri-language film

== See also ==
- Rakhwale, a 1994 Indian Hindi-language film
