= Yamini Singh =

Yamini Singh may refer to:

- Yamini Singh (Hindi actress)
- Yamini Singh (Bhojpuri actress) (born 1996)
