= Jang Bahadur Singh =

Indian folk singer and wrestler (born 1920)

- Born: 10 December 1920 (age 105); Kausar, Bihar and Orissa Province, British India
- Other name: Sher-e-Bihar
- Occupations: Folk Singer, Wrestler
- Years active: 1942–1975
- Spouse: Mahesha Devi
- Children: 6 (3 deceased)
- Musical career
- Genres: Old Bhojpuri Folk, Bhairavi, Bhajan, Nirgun, Ghazals
- Instrument: Vocals

Jang Bahadur Singh (born 10 December 1920) is an Indian Bhojpuri folk singer and wrestler, who was popular during the 1940s to 1970s in the Bihar, Jharkhand & Bengal Region. He follows Mahatma Gandhi and his principles. He was born in Kausad village in the Siwan district of Bihar on 10 December 1920. He sings in the Vyas style, a Bhojpuri folk singing genre. He was a wrestler in the Bihar and Bengal Region and received the title of Sher-e-Bihar when he defeated a heavy weight wrestler from Bengal side. He used to inspire the youth to fight for freedom by singing patriotic songs, for which the British imprisoned him. Nowadays, he resides in his paternal village.

== Early life ==
Jang Bahadur Singh was born in Kausar Village of Siwan district of Bihar on 10 December 1920. His father Vishun Singh was a farmer and her mother Dharohara Devi was a home-maker. His father had nine sons from three marriages. His father left his mother alone with three sons. She brought up all three children on her own. He is second in all three. His one younger brother named Ramdev Singh was a famous labour leader. At the age of 22-23, Jang Bahadur had come to his younger brother, Ramdev Singh, in Coalfield, Shivpur Koilary of Jharia, Dhanbad. There, He participated in Wrestling match. He was representing Bihar in that wrestling battle. A wrestler of about three quintals fighting from the Bengal side was very famous in those times. He had been never defeated in any wrestling match. But, Jang Bahadur defeated him in that Dhanbad match and got a title Sher-e-Biharin that match. After that he started wrestling in all over Bengal and Bihar Region.

== Career in wrestling and singing ==
Jang Bahadur Singh participated in wrestling matches in his early twenties. But those matches were not giving him any monetary benefit. So, he had to shift his focus from wrestling to a job in Sen Raleigh Bicycle Company in Asansol. Though he had been fighting in small wrestling competitions. Once he was attending a local music concert known as Dugola. Three popular singers of that time were together defeating a singer in musical battle called Dugola. Jang Bahadur Singh, sitting as a spectator, opposed this. Those singers challenged him to come in the musical battle and sing with them. A wrestler at heart took up this dare. He started practicing music and later defeated those all three singers in different musical battles or Dugola. And a wrestler became a singer.

Jang Bahadur Singh started singing songs filled with inspiring stories of Ramayana, Characters of Mahabharata, Bhishma, Karna, Kunti, Draupadi, Sita, Bharat, Ram. It was mid forties of 20th century, freedom struggle was rising in the country. He was young and patriotic. He started singing patriotic songs narrating courageous stories of Chandra Shekhar Azad, Bhagat Singh, Subhash Chandra Bose, Veer Abdul Hamid, Mahatma Gandhi etc. on various public gatherings and rebellion-meetings. Gradually, he became very popular in the Bhojpuri public. Then there was such a period that even if Jang Bahadur did not attend the event, the organizers used to put his picture on the poster-banner to mobilize the crowd. This came into notice of British Authorities. British officers threatened him to stop singing rebellious songs or be ready to face dire consequences. He pays no heed to them and started singing those songs more vocally. The British were irked of his doings and imprisoned him for months.

== Personal life ==
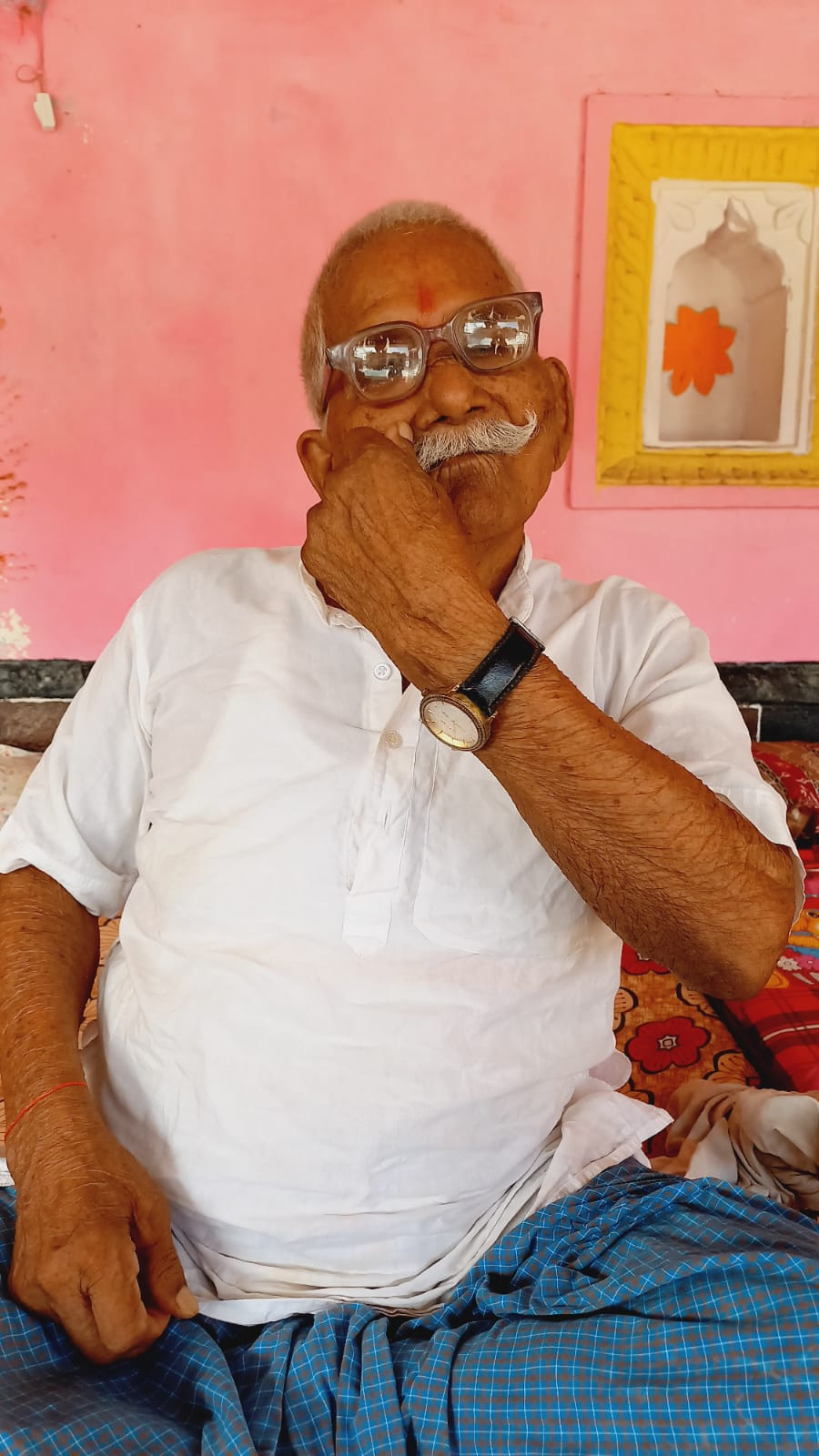
Jung Bahadur Singh in his old age

Jang Bahadur Singh has four sons and two daughters. His career as a musician came to a complete halt when many accidents happened in his family. In 1970, his son and daughter died suddenly. He got broken and gradually reduced his singing on the stage. Misfortune had not given up yet, wife Mahesha Devi got badly burnt while cooking one day. Jang Bahadur had to take care of his wife. He could not understand whether to handle his music or family. His voice began to break. Around 1980, another son died of cancer. Then Jang Bahadur was completely broken from inside. He has two living sons, the elder son is mentally and physically disabled. The younger son Raju has taken care of the whole family as he earns while living in abroad. At the age of 102, he still sings kirtan in the temple of his village. His younger brother and labor leader Ramdev Singh died in April 2022. Whenever he remembers his brother, he starts singing Nirgun and Kabir-bhajans.
