= Priyanka Singh =

Indian playback singer (born 1990)

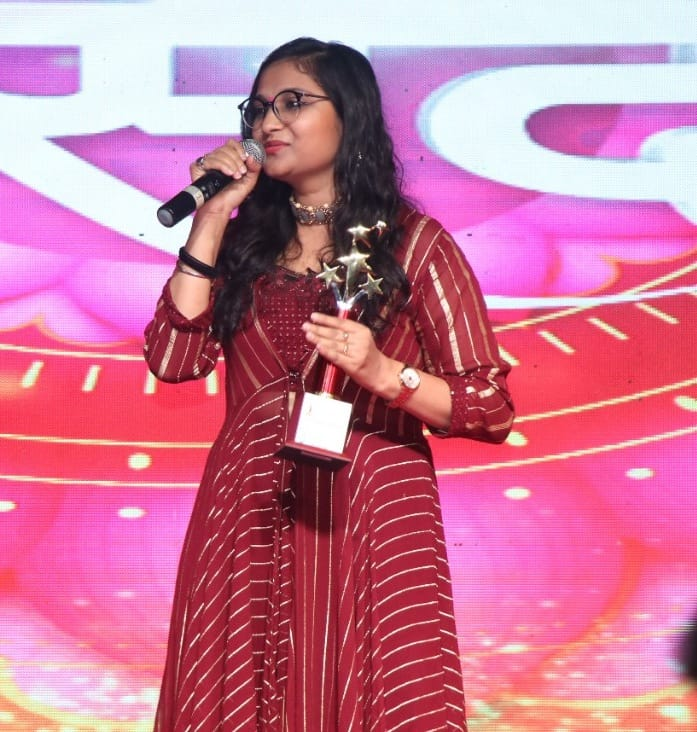
- Born: 9 May 1990 (age 36); Gopalganj, Bihar, India
- Occupations: Singer; Composer
- Years active: 2008 –present
- Awards: See below
- Musical career
- Genres: Filmi; Western Fusion; Bhojpuri Folk; Ghazals; Bhajans; Classical; Electronic
- Instrument: Vocals
- Website: https://thepriyankasingh.com/

Priyanka Singh (born 9 May 1990) is an Indian playback singer and performer who is mainly active in Bhojpuri and Hindi cinema. She made her singing debut on the reality show Sur Sangram Season - 1, broadcast on Mahua Channel. She has sung more than two thousand songs in Bhojpuri, Hindi and Assamese.

== Early life ==
Priyanka Singh won several musical competitions before her television debut at 19.

Her Sibling who is Bhanu Pratap Singh was also a singer and appeared for Indian Idol in 2007-08 season who is currently Educating at ARSD(Delhi University)

== Career ==
Singh started her YouTube channel, named Priyanka Singh Official.

In 2016, she sung "Chalakata Humaro Jawaniya ye Raja" with singer and actor Pawan Singh.

Singh works with Bollywood music directors and film-makers.

== Recognition ==
In 2019 and 2020, she performed in Mainpaat Mahotsav of Chhattisgarh.

== Discography ==
=== Bhojpuri Films ===
Year	Song	Film	Composer	Co-singer
2018	"Daal De Kewadi Mein Killi"	Balam Ji Love You		Khesari Lal Yadav
2018	"Body Jakad Gayil Ba"	Balam Ji Love You		
2018	"Adhaai Baje"	Balam Ji Love You		Khesari Lal Yadav
2018	"Tohre Kaaranwa Raat Bhar Jagal Rahile"	Balam Ji Love You		Khesari Lal Yadav
2018	"Lasar Fasar Bhail Ba Mizaj"	Channa Jor Garam		
2025	"Sautiniya"	Mere Husband Ki Shadi Hai		Alka Jha, Om Jha
2025	" Dil Ke Ghaat Par"	Mere Husband Ki Shadi Hai		
2025	"Batiya Maan la Piya"	Mere Husband Ki Shadi Hai		
2025	"Dil Ke Bhitariya"	Rishtey		Khesari Lal Yadav
2025	"Ha Pagla Koi Deewan"	Jugal Master		
2025	"Sonha Sonha"	Jugal Master		Akshat Jha
2025	"SAATH SAATH CHALAB HAR KADAM"	Priya Beauty Parlour		
