= Musafiraa =

2024 Marathi film directed by Pushkar Jog

- Theatrical release poster
- Directed by: Pushkar Jog
- Written by: Emeara; Amber Hadap
- Produced by: Anand Pandit; Roopa Pandit; Pushkar Jog; Nitin Vaidya
- Starring: Pushkar Jog; Pooja Sawant; Smrity Sinha; Pushkaraj Chirputkar; Dissha Pardesi
- Cinematography: Yogesh Koli
- Music by: Rohan-Rohan; Suhit Abhyankar; Sai Piyush
- Production companies: Anand Pandit Motion Pictures; Aish Motion Pictures; Nitin Vaidya Productions; Goosebumps Entertainment
- Release date: 2 February 2024
- Country: India
- Language: Marathi

Musafiraa (transl. Traveller) is a 2024 Marathi-language coming-of-age adventure drama film directed by Pushkar in his directorial debut and produced by Anand Pandit, Roopa Pandit, Pushkar Jog and Nitin Vaidya under Anand Pandit Motion Pictures, Aish Motion Pictures, Goosebumps Entertainment and Nitin Vaidya Productions. The film stars an ensemble cast of Pushkar Jog, Pooja Sawant, Smrity Sinha, Pushkaraj Chirputkar and Dissha Pardeshi. The film highlights the importance of friendship at every turn of life.

== Cast ==
- Pushkar Jog as Nishank
- Pooja Sawant as Megha
- Smrity Sinha as Kreya
- Pushkaraj Chirputkar as Amey
- Dissha Pardeshi as Mithila
- Chetan Mohture as Vihaan
- Madhav Deochakke
- Meera Sarang
- Danielle Walsh

== Production ==
This film marked the second collaboration between producer Anand Pandit and Jog; previously, they had collaborated on Victoria - Ek Rahasya in 2023. The film was one of the big-budget films in Marathi and the first Indian film to be shot on the Isle of Skye in the Scottish Highlands. It also marked Bhojpuri actress Smrity Sinha's debut in Marathi films.

== Soundtrack ==
The songs are composed by Rohan-Rohan and Suhit Abhyankar, and the lyrics are penned by Mandar Cholkar.

Sound track
No.	Title	Lyrics	Music	Singer(s)	Length
1.	"Musafiraa"	Mandar Cholkar	Rohan-Rohan	Vishal Dadlani	3:29
2.	"Man Bebhaan"	Mandar Cholkar	Suhit Abhyankar	Suhit Abhyankar	3:25
Total length:					6:54

== Release and reception ==
The film was officially announced in mid-June 2023. The official film poster featuring the five main leads was released on 22 November 2023, with a grand poster of about 20 feet long also unveiled on the premises of Plaza Cinema in Mumbai.
