= Ramdev Singh =

Socialist and Trade Union leader (1935–2022)

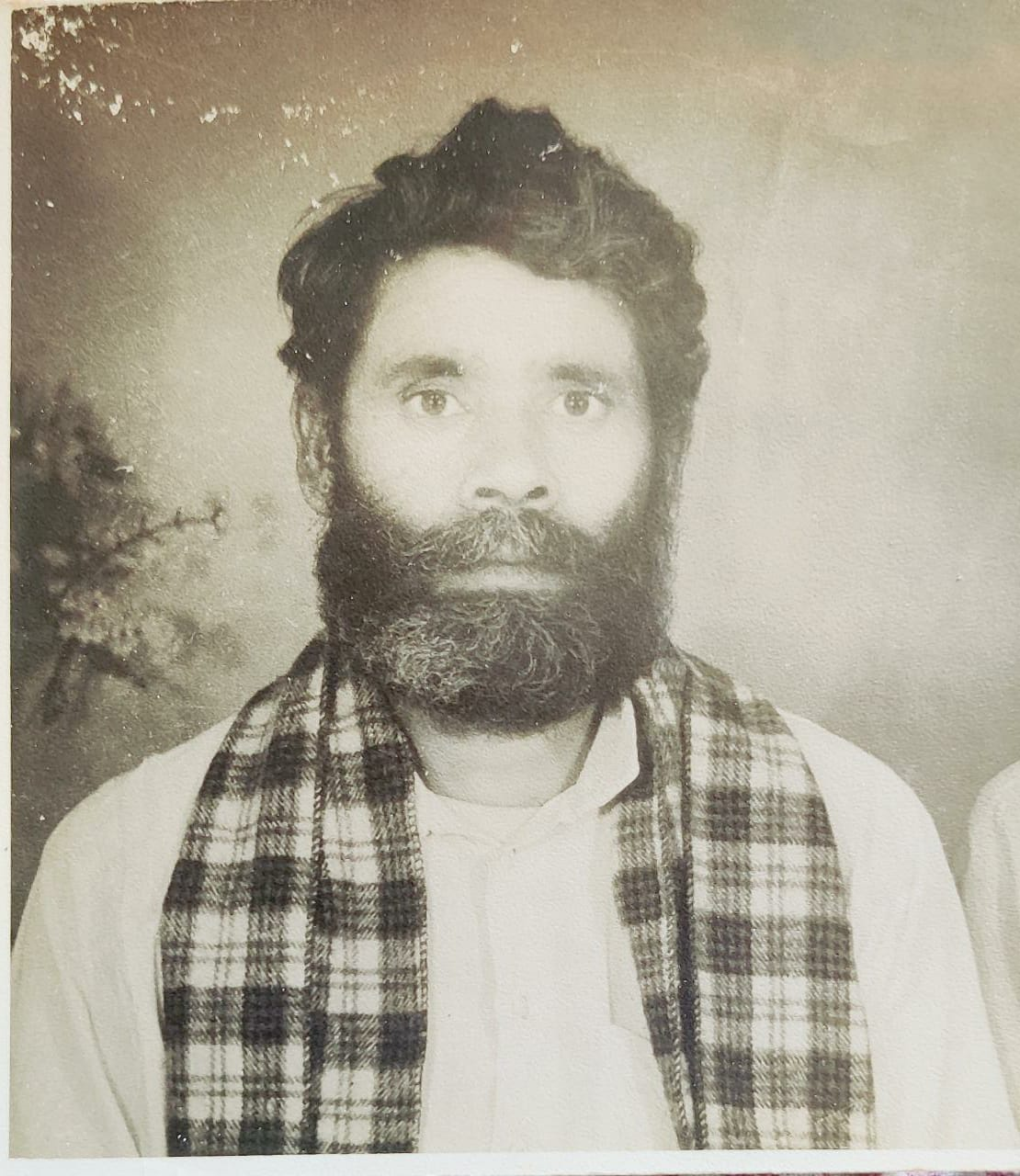
- Born: Ramdev Singh; 8 October 1935; Kausar village, Siwan District, Bihar, British India
- Died: 14 April 2022 (aged 86); Renukoot, Uttarpradesh, Republic of India
- Organization: Rashtriya Shramik Sangh
- Known for: First Trade Union Leader of HINDALCO, Renukoot
- Spouse: Sunaina Singh
- Children: 4, including Manoj Bhawuk

Ramdev Singh (8 October 1935 – 14 April 2022) was the first trade union leader (mazdoor neta) of Hindalco Industries Limited, Renukoot of Aditya Birla Group. The union leader who represented the workers of Hindalco and other factories in Sonbhadra and Mirzapur. He was known among workers between 1963 and 1977. Workers referred to him as 'Neta ji' and looked to him as a leader. He organized multiple strikes involving thousands of workers against Hindalco management to address labor conditions.

== Early life ==
Singh left home to earn his livelihood at the age of 12. He couldn’t go to school.

== Early history & trade union ==
Singh came to Gorakhpur in search of a job. At 18, he became a supervisor in a company. His salary was 70 rupees monthly. He was the sole breadwinner in his family, so this amount was not enough. He had to go to Shivpur coalfield of Jharia to earn more money. Ramdev Singh was a born leader and tactful in making relations. He used to get close with officers and influential people easily. He got in touch with a famous leader and activist Raj Narain ji who went on to become a health minister in U. P. govt. Raj Narain ji was the only person who defeated Indira Gandhi in the general elections of 1977.

When Singh’s mother realised that he was working in dreadful conditions in the coal-field, she persuaded him to leave that job. He was close to his mother, so he resigned. Singh went to J.K. Nagar, where he learned about Hindalco. Many workers were shifting to Renukoot where Hindalco was opening their operations. It was 1962, when Singh too shifted to Renukoot and joined Hindalco as a wager. He was assigned to work in pot room where furnaces were emitting unbearable heat. All wagers had to work in miserable and dangerous conditions. They were treated like animals. They had to leave their food on plates, if officers called them. There were no proper rooms and facilities for wagers provided by factory management. 20-30 wagers had to live in tiny tin-shades. After observing this mismanagement, Ramdev Singh fumed at Hindalco officers. A few days after joining the factory, he went straight to talk to the foreman of his shift. The foreman asked him to do only what he ought to do. He didn’t back his stand. He then tried to talk to other senior staff. One officer threatened to expel him from the company. He told Singh to go and earn crores of rupees, then come to question the Birla group. Singh replied that if there are crores in Birla's treasury, it is because we are working hard to make him rich. This very sentence irked that officer. He talked to his superiors and issued a chargesheet to Ramdev Singh. Ramdev Babu lit his cigarette and burnt that paper into ashes before him just like films. Ramdev Babu was terminated that day without prior information.

Next day, when he went to the factory, he was stopped by security guards at the entry gate. Then workers learned that Ramdev Singh was stopped at the gate for questioning the management. They started gathering at the gate in support of him. Almost all workers of Hindalco sat at the gate demanding entry of Ramdev Singh into the factory. They started sloganeering, if you will not let him in, we’ll not work. That was the moment when workers got their voice in the name of Ramdev Babu. He became their leader on that day only. Management hurriedly let Singh come into the factory and work. But he became a target of the company management. After some months, Singh made the first trade union in Hindalco and built an office by raising wooden planks and putting tin shade over it. He named his trade union ‘Rashtriya Shramik Sangh’. He started fighting more vigorously with management for betterment of workers. And after some months, management terminated him without any reason. He came out of Hindalco but did not give up on his fight for workers; however he started meeting with leaders and influential people to get support in this movement. Hindalco management deployed a team to keep their eyes on him. Ramdev Singh used to change his locations to dodge them. They plotted arrests of many close associates of Ramdev Babu. Even Ramdev Babu went to jail several times. There are various testimonies in the media that some top officers of Hindalco hired assassins to get rid of him.

== Strikes of 1963 and 1966 ==
After constant talks and meetings with the Hindalco management over the interests of workers, Singh decided to go on strike. On the very night of 1963, at 11 pm, hundreds of workers gathered and started a strike. It lasted for three days. Hindalco management came with a settlement clause of no victimization.

Ramdev Singh with his party members again called for strike in 1966. On 12 August, thousands of laborers sat in agitation. This strike was also to demand a proper solution for their problems. It was a bigger and longer strike than the former strike. It lasted for several months. On the call of Ramdev Singh, all the workers of Hindalco left their job and joined his strike. Asia’s biggest aluminum producing factory had to shut down its operation for 2 months. People often say, it was historic and it happened for the first and last time when chimneys of Hindalco stopped emitting smoke. Company Management conspired to end the strike. They terminated 318 people from the job and published their names on notice boards and local newspapers. Slowly, many workers started going to work due to fear of losing their job. But the strike continued. One of the strike leaders, Rakesh Chaturvedi had started publishing the newspaper ‘Swatantra Senani’ in Robertsganj to support the strike. Author and senior journalist Ajay Shekhar was also part of that newspaper. Management forcefully stopped the publication just after two issues.

Rakesh Chaturvedi contested legislative elections in 1967 and became M.L.A. After thirteen and half months, he again had dialogues with Hindalco management and got most of the workers re-recruited. Still 14 workers were not taken on board, Ramdev Singh was one of them. He was the main leader of that strike and management never wanted him back in to the factory. Ramdev Singh remained unemployed until 1977. Ramdev Singh also went against Hindalco management to establish markets in the vicinity of the factory. He united the traders and worked day and night to settle them. Eventually, Renukoot turned into a shining market. Ramdev Singh founded ‘Vyapar Mandal’ and became its first chairman.

== Political influence ==
Ramdev Singh never stopped his agitations for laborers’ welfare. He widened his area and started fighting for other factory workers’ strikes. This was the reason he attracted several influential leaders of that era like former Prime Minister Ch. Charan Singh, Chandra Shekhar, socialist leader Ram Manohar Lohia, Jayaprakash Narayan and George Fernandes. Former Union minister Raj Narain was his close friend who always stood beside Ramdev Singh. He started attending various political meetings and laborers’ jan sabha. He came to Bihar to join the J.P. movement in 1974. He was becoming popular. Several influential leaders started coming to his home in Pipari (Renukoot), which scared the management badly. Ramdev Singh had got an appointment to meet the then Prime minister Shri Lal Bahadur Shastri. Meanwhile, Shastri ji went for Tashkent agreement but unfortunately never returned. He was political mentor of former chief minister of Uttar Pradesh Ram Naresh Yadav. Once in his older age, Ramdev babu fell seriously ill and was admitted at a hospital in Lucknow. When Ram Naresh ji learned about his political guru's health, he hurriedly came to meet him without caring about any protocol.

Some top officers plotted an attack on Ramdev Singh. One of his companions, Madan Pandey, was injured by 17 knife strikes. He was saved in time. He later joined the Congress and became a Member of Parliament. Ramdev Singh’s office was burnt by management, where several documents related to his movements got burnt. One of the attackers was an admirer of Ramdev Babu. He later met him and apologized for his deed. Ramdev Babu learned from the attacker about the whole conspiracy made for his murder.

Ramdev Singh was very fierce and fearless, so was Raj Narain ji. This was the main reason for their strong bond. When Raj Narain found out about this, he came to meet his long time friend Ramdev Singh. It was 1977, he asked Hindalco president to meet him. Ramdev Babu got the job at his behest. So, after 14 years of being unemployed, he was finally re-recruited by Hindalco. His family lived in miserable conditions. Their children were growing up and their future was being sacrificed by the revolution of the father. After persuasion by many people including Raj Narain ji, Ramdev Babu agreed to join the factory. Though he was working under Hindalco management but never bowed before them. He got many offers to enter politics which he softly rejected. Even he refused to contest general elections on congress ticket. He was a true socialist and remained a lifelong benefactor of society and laborers.

== Personal life ==
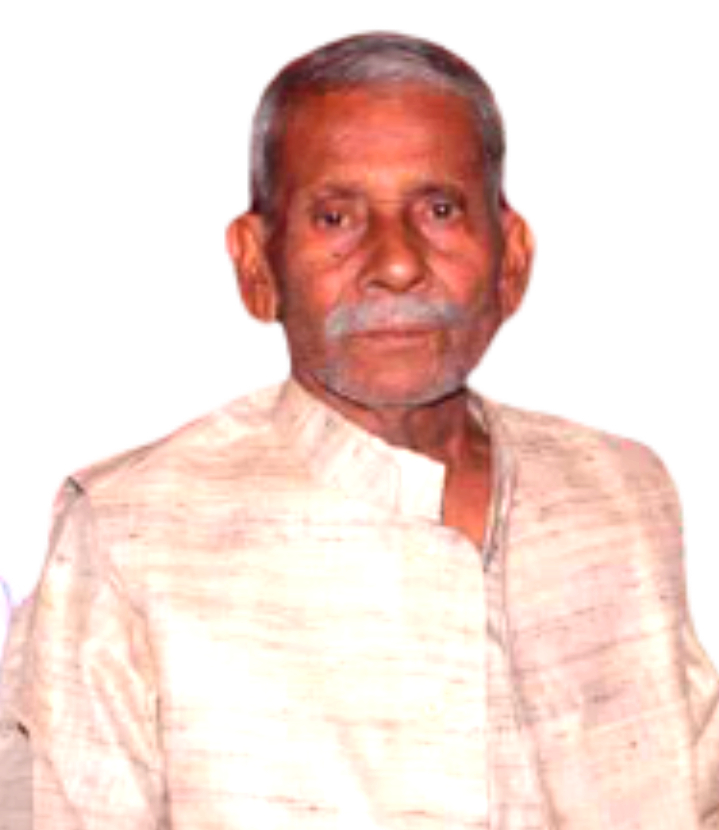
Singh in his old age

Singh's father had nine sons from three marriages. His father left his mother alone with three sons. She brought up all three children on her own. Singh soon left home to take the responsibility. His elder brother Jang Bahadur Singh is a folk singer. Ramdev Singh was married to Sunaina Devi. Ramdev Singh had three sons: Umesh, Manoj, Dharmendra and a daughter Durgesh. His second son Manoj Singh (known as Manoj Bhawuk) is carrying on his father's social legacy. He is a poet, TV personality and film actor. His youngest son Dharmendra Singh is a singer and entrepreneur. His elder brother-in-law Prof. Rajgrih Singh is a famous writer and social activist and the younger one Rajnath Singh Rakesh is a poet. Ramdev Singh died at the age of 87 on 14 April 2022.

== Legacy ==
Singh's second son Manoj Bhawuk announced a trust in his father’s name which will honor a person every year who has made a valuable contribution to the welfare of laborers or in the field of labor. He will write a biography of his father to tell the world about his life's journey and struggle dedicated to laborers. Manoj also announced plans to make a documentary on his father's struggle for which he would interview his father’s living companions and eyewitnesses and do in-depth research.
