= Inter-caste marriage in Nepal =

Type of marriage in Nepal

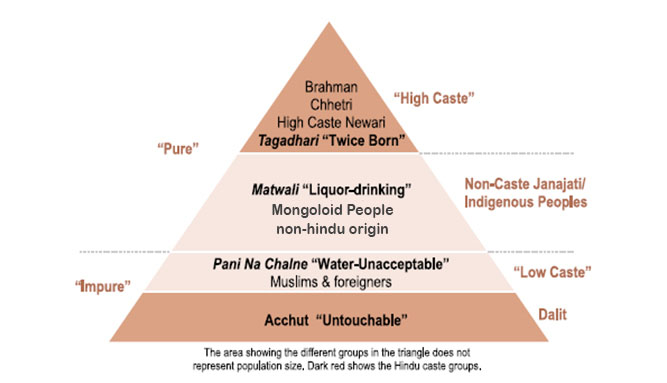
The Muluki Ain caste/ethnicity hierarchy of Nepal, 1854

Inter-caste marriage (Nepali: अन्तरजातीय विवाह pronounced [ʌntaɾd͡zatie bibaː]) is a type of marriage that is done outside of one's caste. Nepal has many castes and inter-caste marriage is generally considered taboo. However, this kind of marriage has been gradually gaining acceptance.

It is against the law to discriminate against a person for their "cultural and ethnic" background. Nevertheless, most Nepali families disapprove of inter-caste marriages because "they fear they will become social outcasts". According to research done by Jagaran Media Center, inter-caste marriage often leads to harassment, forced separation, displacement, and institutional discrimination. Additionally, brides who are not accepted by their families were found to be at risk of depression and psychosocial difficulties.

== Background and reactions ==
In 1854, the Government of Nepal passed the "Muluki Ain" commissioned by Jung Bahadur Rana. This law outlawed marriage between people of a lower caste with those of a higher caste. In 1963, King Mahendra modified the law to abolish the "caste-based unequal citizenship". Since then, inter-caste marriage has been gradually gaining acceptance throughout Nepal.

In 2009, the Government of Nepal announced that it would give a sum of रू100,000 Nepalese rupees (roughly US$1,350) away to couples who have an inter-caste marriage. The recipients would have to claim the sum within 30 days of the marriage. Republica, however, has reported that there was no "government assistance for Dalit women" who were left jilted by their upper-caste husbands.

== Notable incidents ==
=== 2004 Saptari kidnapping ===
In January 2004, Manoj Khanga, a member of the Dalit community, and Parbati Raut, who were in an inter-caste wedding, were reportedly kidnapped by the bride's relatives. Prior to that, the bride's family had filed a complaint in the police claiming that it the marriage was illegal. The couple were arrested but were released a few days later. Subsequently, the Dalit community living in Saptari District, Nepal, was attacked by over 200 upper-caste people and were compelled to leave their village. All of the property owned by Dalit communities was looted and vandalised (worth about est. 15 million Nepalese rupees). The upper-caste community terrorized and told Khanga that they would "kill him in front of his family". The case was sent to the Asian Human Rights Commission.

=== Soti incident ===
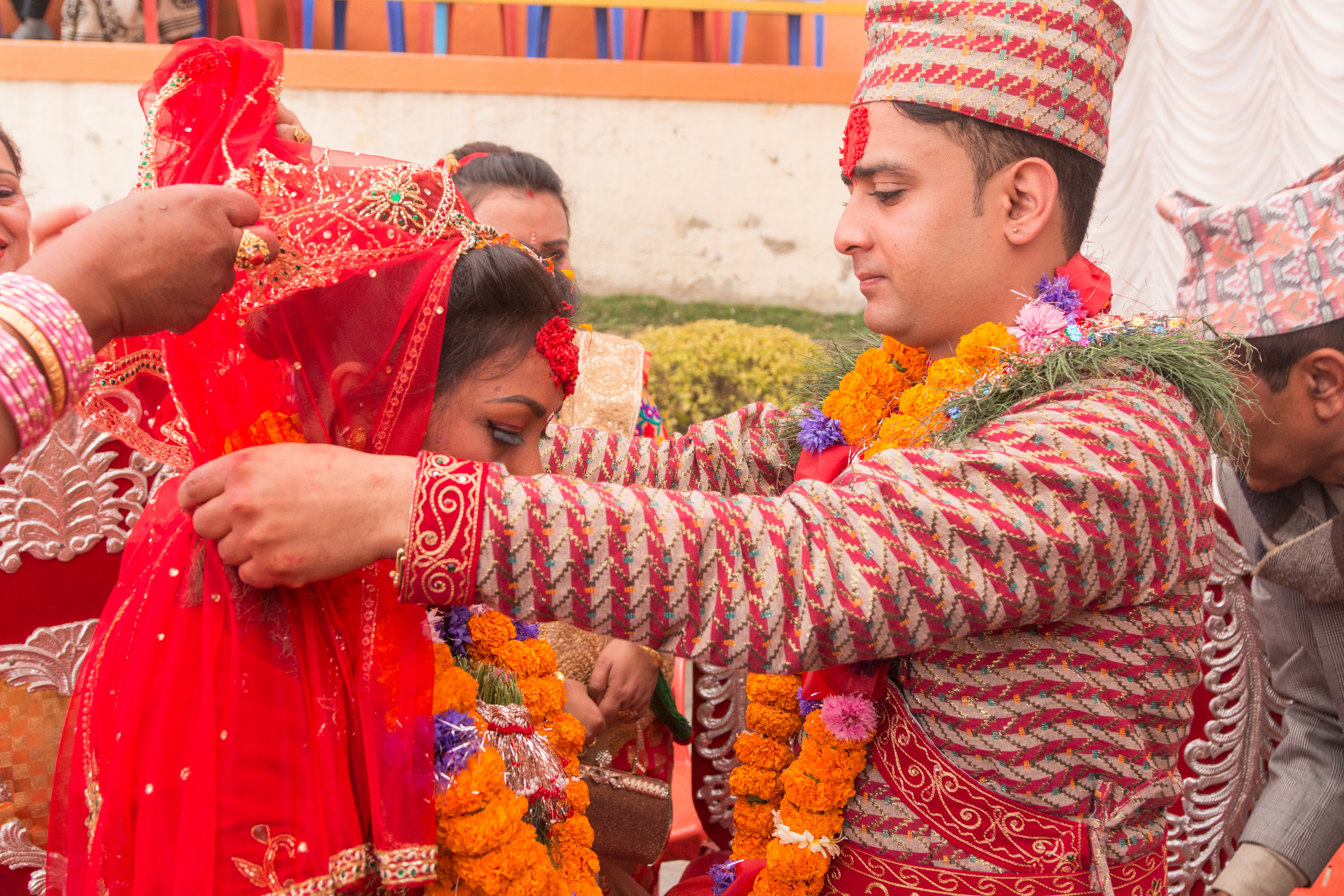
Typical Nepali Hindu wedding

In May 2020, two bodies of Dalit men were found in the Bheri River, a major tributary of the Karnali River. The men were identified as Nabaraj BK and Tikaram Sunar. According to the Nepal police, 21-year-old BK with 18 others went to the Soti village in Chaurjahari to marry a 17-year-old girl. The villagers allegedly attacked the group and chased them to the river. According to some villagers, the group was attacked because of their caste. BK was a "lower-caste" man trying to marry an "upper-caste" girl. The girl's family, however, claimed that BK was trying to marry the underaged girl despite their refusal. BK had been in a relationship with the girl for three years and wanted to marry her. United Nations Mission in Nepal called for an unbiased examination of the incident.

== Notable inter-caste marriages ==
- Former Prime Minister Baburam Bhattarai (Brahmin) and Hisila Yami (Newar)
- Pop singer Nalina Chitrakar (Newar) and Sanjeev Mishra (Madhesi)
- Former Prime Minister KP Sharma Oli (Brahmin) and Rashika Shakya (Newar)

== Inter-caste marriage in film ==
- Pandra Gate (1986), starring Hari Bansha Acharya and Sharmila Malla
- Bato Muni Ko Phool (2010), starring Rekha Thapa and Yash Kumar.
- Ghampani (2017), starring Dayahang Rai and Keki Adhikari

== Inter-caste marriage in literature ==
- Sumnima, a novel by B. P. Koirala

== See also ==
- Love marriage
- Women in Nepal
- Inter-caste marriages in India
