= Channa Jor Garam =

Channa Jor Garam is a 2018 Bhojpuri-Language film directed by Ritesh Thakur and starring Poonam Dubey, Pramod Premi Yadav and Neha Shree in the lead roles.

== Cast ==
- Poonam Dubey
- Neha Shree
- Pramod Premi Yadav
- Aditya Ojha

== Soundtrack ==
- "Chana Jor Garam" by Indu Sonali
- "Piyava Se Nik Ba Takiyava Ho" by Alka Jha
- "Lasar Fasar Bhail Ba Mizaj" by Priyanka Singh
- "Nariyal Ke Pani Apan Ek Thop Chua Da" by Pramod Premi Yadav
- "Chua Ke Mua Da" by Pramod Premi Yadav
- "Saiyan Chatani Ho Karanva Piya Chatkanva Marle Na" by Sakshi Raj
- "Mann Bigar Dele Baru" by Khushbu Jain, Vikash Singh
