= Rakhwala (2013 film) =

- Directed by: Aslam Sheikh
- Written by: Pyare Lal Yadav; Shyam Dehati
- Produced by: Ishtiyaque Sheikh; Ritu Sharma
- Starring: Dinesh Lal Yadav; Rinku Ghosh; Maya Yadav; Avdesh Mishra
- Music by: Dhananjay Mishra
- Distributed by: Venus films
- Release date: 1 February 2013
- Running time: 160 minutes
- Country: India
- Language: Bhojpuri

Rakhwala is an Indian Bhojpuri action film directed by Aslam Sheikh. It stars Dinesh Lal Yadav and Rinku Ghosh in lead roles along with Avdesh Mishra, Brijesh Tripathi, Santosh Srivastav and Maya Yadav. The film was released in Varanasi and Patna, on 1 February 2013 and Mumbai 24 February 2013. It received favorable response from audiences.

== Plot ==
Dharam Singh is a retired army officer. His elder son is a martyr and younger son Satyaprakash has completed his studies, Dharam Singh wishes Satyaprakash to join the army or police force. But Satyaprakash wants to earn and live a simple family life with Shraddha. But his entire life changes after a sudden accident in his life. Satyaprakash's father challenges the strongman Jagdamba Singh, who is the ruffian of that place and is supported by politicians and higher officers, due to which he does all illegal activities like robbery, kidnapping. Once, Dharam Singh was beaten by Jagdamba Singh's mobsters, due to which Satyaprakash is angered and seeks vengeance for his father's mistreatment He decides to become a police officer and battle corruption. After a few years, he becomes an honest police officer. He announces a legal call for all the ruffians like Jabdamba Singh. Police Officer Satyaprakash discovers the evil schemes of the Ministers and higher officers and all the links of terrorists. Before Satyaprakash could catch them red-handed, he was injured by them and is hospitalized in I.C.U. Police vow to complete Satyaprakash's incomplete mission. After a few months, Satyaprakash's health improves, and he resumes his mission. The fact is that Satyaprakash's wife Shraddha and other police officers have replaced one terrorist, Sarfaraj, who looks alike of Satyaprakash. Satyaprakash (Sarfaraj) completes the mission (Rakhwala) and salutes the national flag.

== Cast ==
- Dinesh Lal Yadav as Satyaprakash (Sarfaraj)
- Rinku Ghosh as Shraddha
- Manoj Bhawuk as Satyaprakash's best friend
- Avdesh Mishra as Jagdamba Singh
- Shailesh Pandey as the alcoholic man
- Sambhavna Seth in the item number "Dori Khul Gayeel"
- Maya Yadav in the item number "Devar ho Daba Na Mor Karihaiya"
- Nityanand Shetty as Satyaprakash's father

== Soundtrack ==
#	Title	Singer(s)
1	"Saiya Laika Niyan Sut Jala Kora Mein"	Kalpana Patowary
2	"Maal Ha Bengal Ke"	Indu Sonali
3	"Goriya Chale Machar Machar"	Mohan Rathod
4	"Devar ho Daba Na Mor Karihaiya"	Indu Sonali
5	"Dehiya Pa Raid Padal Ba"	Poornima, Mohan Rathod
6	"Dori Khul Gayeel"	Indu Sonali
