= Eenu Shree =

Indian actress

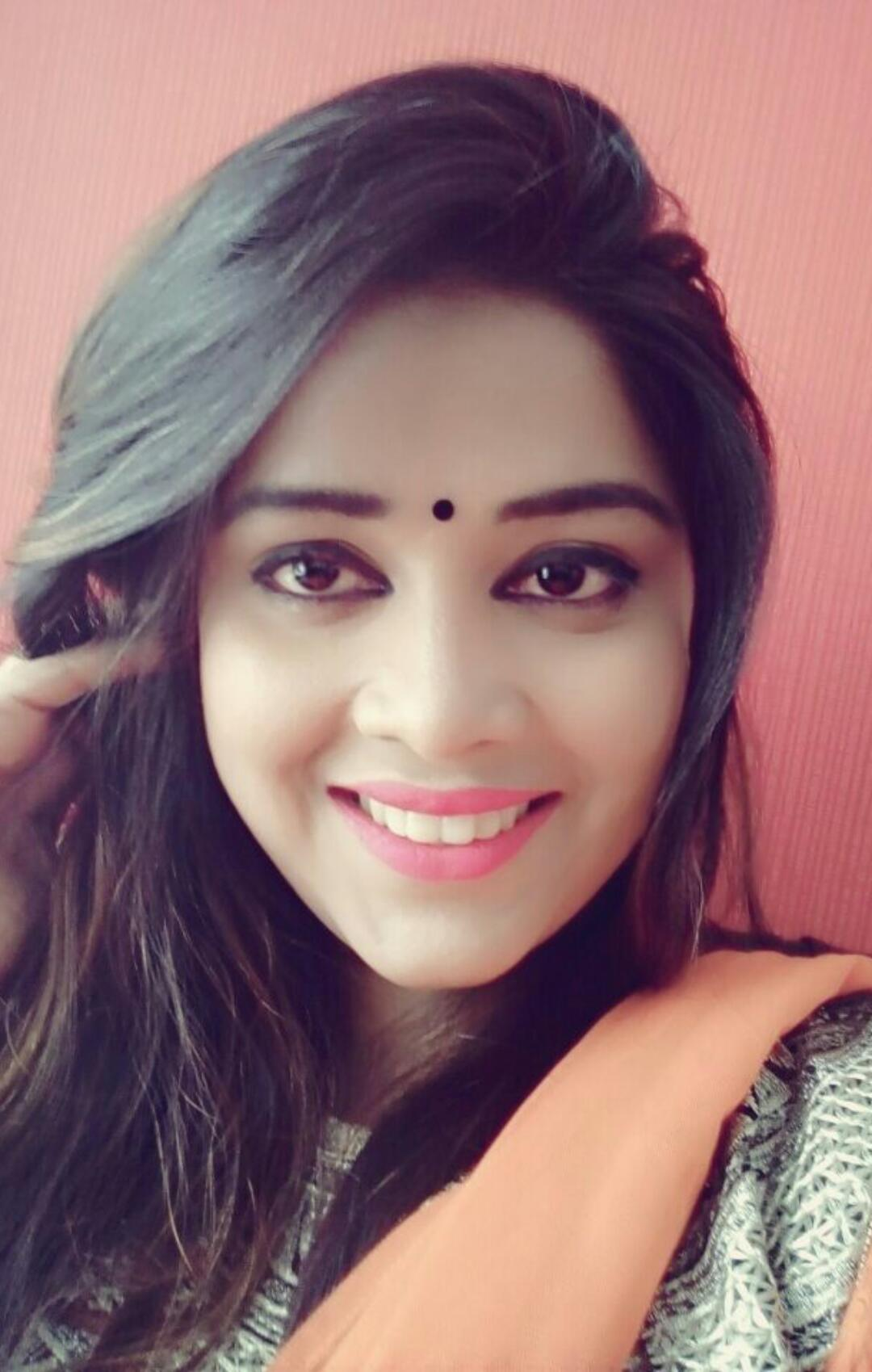
- Born: Jamshedpur, Jharkhand
- Occupation: Actress
- Years active: 2009–present
- Parent(s): Ranjan Kumar Sinha; Binita Sinha

Eenu Shree is an Indian actress who appears in Bhojpuri films.

== Career ==
She appeared in multiple popular Bhojpuri films including Khiladi, Hogi Pyar Ki Jeet, Dahshat and Tridev.

== See also ==
- List of Bhojpuri cinema actresses
