= Poonam Dubey =

Indian actress

- Born: February 8, 1990 (age 36); Allahabad, Uttar Pradesh, India
- Occupations: Actress and model
- Years active: 2013–2025
- Spouse: Gaurav Jain (2025–present)
- Children: 1
- Website: Official website

Poonam Dubey is an Indian actress working in Bhojpuri cinema.

== Awards ==
Ceremony	Category	Year	Film	Result	Reference
Bhojpuri Cine Awards	Best Actress	2018	Rangdari Tax	Won	
Bhojpuri Cinema Screen and Stage Awards	Best Supporting Actress	2018	Rangeela	Won	

== Filmography ==
Key
†	Denotes films that have not yet been released

Year	Film	Role	Co-stars	Language
2014	Jo Jeeta Wahi Sikandar		Khesari Lal Yadav	Bhojpuri
2014	Hamaar Farz		Prince Singh Rajpoot	Bhojpuri
2015	Kaat Ke Rakh Dehab		Seema Singh	Bhojpuri
2015	Jaanam		Khesari Lal Yadav, Viraj Bhatt	Bhojpuri
2015	Inteqam		Khesari Lal Yadav, Viraj Bhatt	Bhojpuri
2016	Ye Mohabbatein		Ravi Kishan	Bhojpuri
2016	Hum Hai Jodi No 1		Ravi Kishan	Bhojpuri
2016	Bahuraani		Anjana Singh	Bhojpuri
2017	Rangdari Tax		Yash Kumar Mishra	Bhojpuri
2017	Ham Hain Lootere		Pawan Singh	Bhojpuri
2018	Channa Jor Garam		Pramod Premi Yadav	Bhojpuri
2018	Munna Mawali		Pramod Premi Yadav	Bhojpuri
2019	Maa Purnagiri		Manish Chaturvedi	Bhojpuri
2021	Mar Kar Bhi Tiger Abhi Zinda Hai		Manmohan Mishra	Bhojpuri
2022	Tu Nikla Chhupa Rustam		Durgesh Singh Chauhan	Bhojpuri
2022	Saiyaa Hamar Dhanwan Baa		Raghav Pandey	Bhojpuri
2023	Hira Babu M.B.B.S		Vimal Pandey	Bhojpuri
2025	Saira Khan Case		Rajneesh Duggal	Hindi

== See also ==
- List of Bhojpuri cinema actresses
