= Raktdhar =

2017 film

- Poster
- Directed by: Ajit Varma
- Screenplay by: Ajit Varma
- Story by: Ajit Varma
- Produced by: Dhananjay Dhawanpatil; Rajan Gupta
- Starring: Jimmy Sharma; Shakti Kapoor; Shahbaz Khan; Mukesh Rishi; Deepshika Nagpal
- Cinematography: Manoj Goswami
- Edited by: Vijay Pal
- Music by: Deepak Agrawal
- Production company: Chitra Films
- Distributed by: Noble Thoughts
- Release date: 6 October 2017
- Country: India
- Language: Hindi

Raktdhar is a 2017 Indian Hindi-language action drama film written and directed by Ajit Varma. The film stars Jimmy Sharma, Shakti Kapoor, Mukesh Rishi, and Deepshika Nagpal. The film producer is Chitra Films Productions. Raktdhar was released in India in October 2017.

== Cast ==
- Jimmy Sharma as Karan
- Shakti Kapoor as Rani
- Shahbaz Khan as Jayraj
- Mukesh Rishi as Linga Shetty
- Deepshika Nagpal as Padmavaathi L Shetty
- Manish Khanna as Subhash
