= Sanchita Banerjee =

Indian film actress

- Born: 23 March 1994 (age 32); Kolkata, West Bengal India
- Occupation: Actress
- Years active: 2017–present
- Notable work: Raktdhar; Crack Fighter; Nirahua Hindustani 2

Sanchita Banerjee is an Indian actress. Banerjee was born on 23 March in the Kolkata, West Bengal India. Banerjee mainly works in Bhojpuri films and television serials. She made her on-screen debut with Raktdhar (2017) and her Bhojpuri debut was Nirahua Hindustani 2.

== Filmography ==
Key
†	Denotes films that have not yet been released

Year	Film	Role	Co-stars	Language	Notes
2012	Katak-The Silver City		Siddhanta Mahapatra	Odia	
2017	Raktdhar		Dinesh Lal Yadav	Hindi	Debut movie
2021	Raksha Bandhan rasal apane Bhai ki dhaal	phooli Umed Singh	Nishant Singh malkani, sanchita Banerjee	serial	Debut movie
2019	Crack Fighter		Pawan Singh	Bhojpuri	
2019	Vivah (2019 film)		Pradeep Pandey, Awdhesh Mishra	Bhojpuri	
2020	Ham Hai Rahi Pyar Ke 2(2020 film)		Pawan Singh, Kajal	Bhojpuri	
