= Manoj Bhawuk =

Indian television presenter (born 1976)

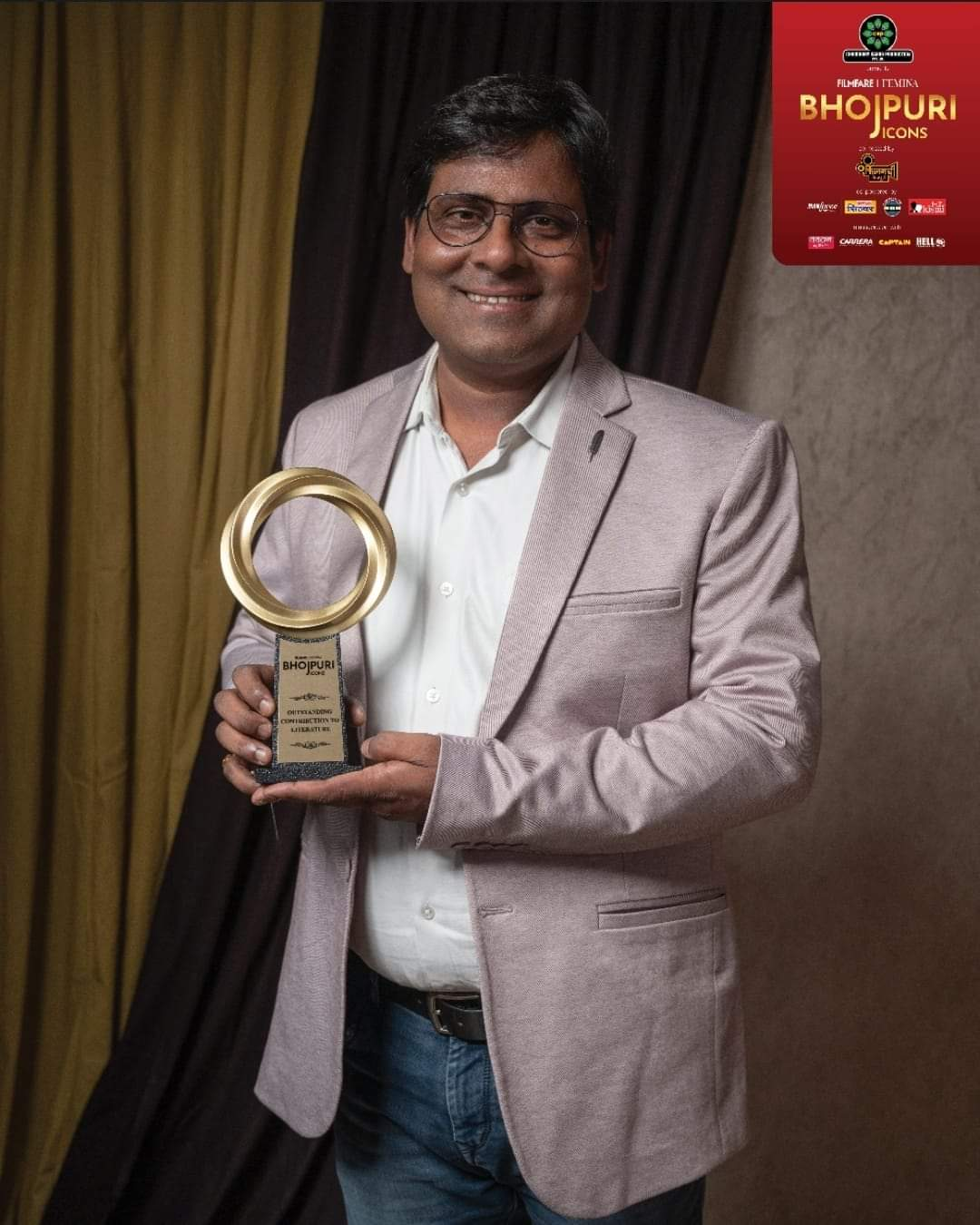
- Manoj Bhawuk after receiving Filmfare & Femina Award

Personal details
- Born: 2 January 1976 (age 50) Kausar, Bihar, India
- Parent: Ramdev Singh
- Occupation: Writer in Zee Entertainment Enterprises Ltd., Bhojpuri poet
- Awards: Filmfare for outstanding contribution in Literature

Manoj Bhawuk (born 2 January 1976) is an Indian poet writing in Bhojpuri, actor, television presenter and screenwriter, active in Bhojpuri cinema. He has been awarded by Filmfare & Femina Bhojpuri Icons in the category of ″Outstanding Contribution in Literature″. He has written many books. He promotes Bhojpuri language and literature. Bhawuk has been the Project Head of Zee TV's reality show Sa Re Ga Ma Pa (Bhojpuri). He is a diploma holder in theatre acting and has acted in TV shows, films and serials. He has been awarded national and international honors. Manoj Bhawuk is the first person who thoroughly researched and documented history of Bhojpuri Cinema and published in various magazines. His research book on the history of Bhojpuri cinema titled Bhojpuri Cinema ke Sansaar, documenting its evolution from its inception to its present-day decline, has been published. The work provides a comprehensive analysis of the artistic, cultural, and commercial trajectory of Bhojpuri cinema over the decades. For this book, he is honored with the Best Writer Award by Saras Salil magazine.

== Early life and education ==
Manoj Bhawuk was born on 2 January 1976 in Kausad village of Siwan district of Bihar. His father Ramdev Singh was a labor leader, and his mother is a homemaker. His father was the first union leader of Hindalco, Renukoot, so Manoj spent his childhood in Renukoot. Manoj completed his schooling from Hindalco High School. He started writing poems and stories from his early age. Bhawuk studied engineering at the Central Institute of Plastics Engineering and Technology and worked as an engineer for a time. Doordarshan]].

== Career ==
In 2017 he began to work with Anjan TV and Mahua Plus. Manoj is also chief editor of e-magazines named Bhojpuria and Bhojpuri Junction. He is the director of Achievers Junction dedicated to the legends of the world. He is also Bhojpuri Language Expert in the board of NIOS (National Institute of Open Schooling) He is a member of the board constituted by the Ministry of Culture, Government of India, for the mission of getting Chhath Puja enlisted in UNESCO.

He is actively writing songs for Bhojpuri films (like, Mehandi Laga ke Rakhna 3, Aapan kahaye wala ke ba). He advocates clean and meaningful lyrics. His ghazal album Tani Tani sa baat ke with legendary Artist Kalpana Patowary is going viral.

== Awards ==
Bhawuk was conferred with the Geetanjali Sahitya Award on 1 September 2018 in Birmingham, United Kingdom by Gitanjali Multilingual Literary Circle, UK for his work and contribution to Bhojpuri Literature. He received the Lokbhasha Samman (लोकभाषा सम्मान) for his innumerous contributions in Bhojpuri literature by Kailash Gautam Srijan Sansthan, constituted in memory of popular poet Kailash Gautam.

- Awarded the Bhartiya Bhasha Samman 2025 in recognition of his dedicated efforts to revive and uphold the pride of the Bhojpuri language.
- Received Paati Samman 2025 for his huge contribution in Bhojpuri Cinema & Literature.
- Honored with the Best Writer Award at the Popular Saras Salil Bhojpuri Cine Awards 2025
- Honored by Filmfare & Femina Bhojpuri Reel and Real Icons Award for his outstanding contribution in Literature.
- Won the Bharatiya Bhasha Parishad Award 2006 by Gulzar and Girija Devi for the book for Tasveer Zindagi Ke
- Won the International Bhojpuri Gaurav Samman, Mauritius 2014 by Sir Anerood Jugnauth, the Prime Minister of Mauritius
- Received the Parikalpana Lok Bhushan Samman in Kathmandu, Nepal (First time this award was given for Bhojpuri literature) in 2013
- Geetanjali Sahitya Award on 1 September 2018 in Birmingham, United Kingdom by Gitanjali Multilingual Literary Circle, UK for his work and contribution to Bhojpuri Literature.
- Kailash Gautam Kavya-Kunth Lokbhasha Samman on 27 December 2022 by Kailash Gautam Srijan Sansthan
- Awarded by Anjan Samman 2023 for his contribution in Bhojpuri Literature.

== Personal life ==
He married Anita Singh in 2005 and now they have two children Himanshu and Shivanshu.
