= Smrity Sinha =

Indian film actress (born 1989)

- Born: 4 September 1989 (age 37); Jharkhand, India
- Occupation: Actress
- Years active: 2007–present
- Notable work: Sajan Chale Sasural; Bandhan; Sajan Chale Sasural 2

Smrity Sinha is an Indian actress. Sinha was born on 4 September 1989 in the Dumka district of Jharkhand into a Sinha family (Famous Ambastha Kayastha Sinha Family) . Smrity mainly works in Bollywood & Bhojpuri films and television serials. She made her on-screen debut with Rangila Babu (2008) and her Bhojpuri television debut was Jai Maa Vaishno Devi (1994 film)

== Filmography ==
Year	Film	Co-actors	Language
2008	Rangeela Babu		Bhojpuri
2009	Pyar Bina Chain Kaha Re		Bhojpuri
2010	Shaadi Biyaah		Bhojpuri
2011	Sajan Chale Sasural	Khesari Lal Yadav	Bhojpuri
2012	Saugandh Ganga Maiya Ke		Bhojpuri
2012	Devre par Manwa Dole		Bhojpuri
2013	Pyar Jhukta Nahi		Bhojpuri
2013	Laadli		Bhojpuri
2013	Hawa me Udta Jaye Lal Duptta Malmal Ka		Bhojpuri
2013	Prem Diwani		Bhojpuri
2014	Khoon Bhari Maang		Bhojpuri
2014	Kachche Dhage		Bhojpuri
2014	Pratigya 2	Khesari Lal Yadav, Anil Samrat	Bhojpuri
2014	Anuradha		Bollywood
2015	Bandhan		Bhojpuri
2015	Suhaag		Bhojpuri
2016	Doodh Ka Karz		Bhojpuri
2016	Sajna pe Dil Aa Gayil		Bhojpuri
2016	Yeh Mohabbatein		Bhojpuri
2016	Sajan Chale Sasural 2	Khesari Lal Yadav	Bhojpuri
2017	Tiger		Odia
2018	Balam Ji Love You	Khesari Lal Yadav	Bhojpuri
2019	Parwarish		Bhojpuri
2019	Bhag Khesari Bhag	Khesari Lal Yadav	Bhojpuri
2019	Lalten		Bhojpuri
2024	Musafiraa	Pushkar Jog	Marathi

== Television ==
Year	Show name	Channel name
2007	Sapna Babul Ka... Bidaai	Star Plus
2008	Jai Maa Vaishno Devi	9X
2008	Waqt Batayega Kaun Apna Kaun Paraya	Sony
2008	Crime Patrol	SONY
2009	Jaane Pehchaane Se... Ye Ajnabbi	Star One
2010	Horror Nights	Star One
2011	Nach Nachaiya Dhoom Machaiya	Mahua
2013	BIG Memsaab	Big Magic
2013	Rasoi Ki Rani	Big Magic
2014	Jai Bholenath	Big Ganga
2015	Suryaputra Karn	Sony
2016	Hindustan ka Big Star	Big Ganga

== Awards and nominations ==
Ceremony	Category	Year	Film	Result	Reference
International Bhojpuri Film Awards show Mauritius	Best anchor	2015		Won	
Vishwa Bhojpuri Sammelan Awards show Mumbai	Best anchor	2017		Won	
Shivraj Mudra Chhatrapati Awards show Mumbai	Shivraj Mudra Chhatrapati Awards	2017		Won	
Sabrang Film Awards show Mumbai	Most beautiful actress	2018	Sajan Chale Sasural 2	Won	
Green Cinema Award show Mumbai	Best actress	2019	Bhag Khesari Bhag	Won	
Bhojpuri Film Awards show Mumbai	Special award	2019		Won	

== See also ==
- List of Bhojpuri cinema actresses
