= Yash Kumar =

Nepali singer and actor (born 1978)

- यश कुमार
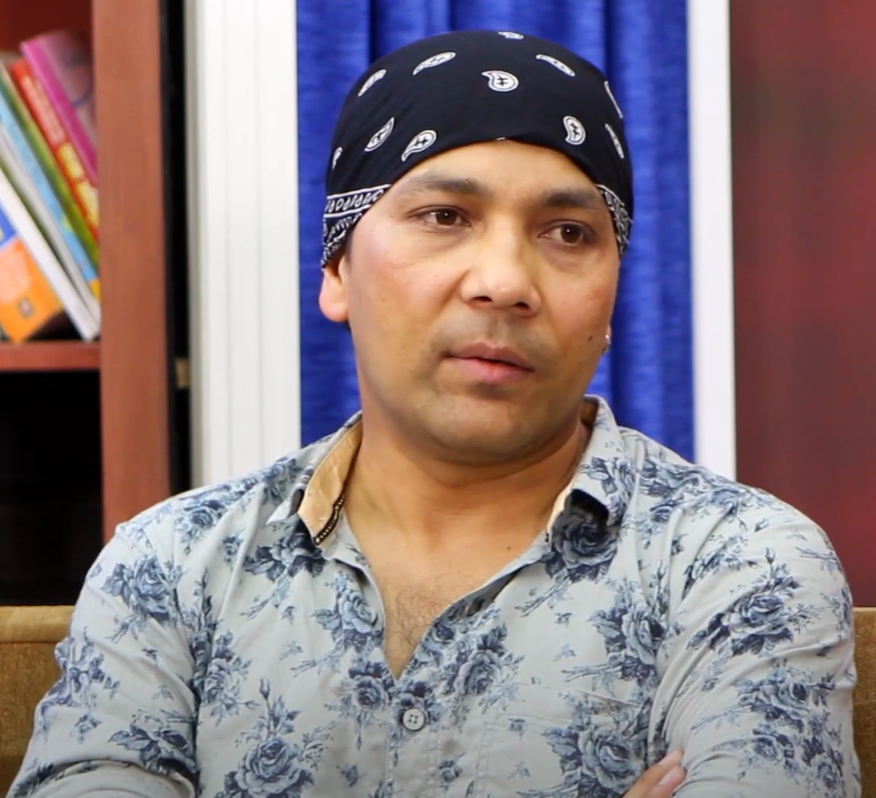
- Yash Kumar in 2019
- Born: Suresh Kumar Nepal Pariyar; 16 November 1978 (age 47); Sarlahi district, Nepal
- Known for: Singer and Actor
- Notable work: Reason (Music Album), Tirkha (Music Album), Batomuniko Phool (Movie)
- Style: Modern Pop
- Spouse: Reena Shahi

Yash Kumar (Nepali: यश कुमार; born 16 November 1978) is a Nepali singer, songwriter, music composer, and actor. He has received numerous awards, including, Best playback singer,3rd Himalayan international Nepali Music Award(Dubai)2020. 4th Epic Nepal Music Award 2079, Best modern singer. AMIN National Music Award 2023, Best Decade Singer. Nepal Music and fashion AWARD 2022. Best Singer. 2nd Silver international Music AWARD 2023(Malaysia) Best Debut actor (NEFTA)2011 from National Film Award. He is also an activist against the untouchability system in Nepal. He has been Honoured by President Ram chandra Poudel with Social service Award on the occasion of constitutional day

== Biography ==
Yash Kumar was born on 16 November 1978 to father Ram Nepal and mother Gita Nepal (Pariyar) in Sarlahi, Nepal. He currently resides in Kathmandu with his wife and two sons.

== Career ==
Yash Kumar started as a music composer in 2000. His debut album was Yo Sansar where he composed all songs. "Behal Bhayo Zindagi Yo" became an instant hit from the album. Even though he released his second album Umer in 2001, Yash Kumar rose to fame for his third solo album Reason. The song "Maile Chhoyeko Paani Chaldaina" became the chartbuster song of the year which bagged him several awards. He again released his fourth album Tirkha which became another successful album of his career with a popular of a song "Ma Aafnai Aaganma Inar Banauchhu" from the album. He release his fifth album Timi in 2005 which was a medium hit followed by his sixth album Na Rune Aakha Haru. Even though he modeled for most of his music videos, he debuted in movie Bato Muniko Phool in 2010 as a lead actor. Bato Muniko Phool was the highest budget movie in Nepal of the year. He later acted in the movies Veer, Aadhi Bato, Baato Muniko Phool 2 as a lead actor. Yash Kumar last appeared in the movie Tshering in 2018, in which he debuted as a director as well.

=== Music albums ===
- Yo sansar
- Umer
- Reason
- Tirkha
- Timi
- Narune Aankhaharu
- Rain”

=== Acting ===
Yash Kumar has worked in various movies such as:

- Bato Muniko Phool
- Veer
- Aadhi Baato
- Bato Muniko Phool 2
- Tshering

== Activism ==
Yash Kumar's parent had an inter-caste marriage. His father was from a Brahmin family and mother from a Dalit family. His birth name was Suresh Kumar Nepal, taking the family name "Nepal" from his father. But while making the citizenship card, he added "Pariyar" to his formal name to include his mother's family identity. The addition of Dalit identity caused various discrimination, due to which he started to actively act against the untouchability system that is prevalent in Nepal towards the Dalit community. Initially, he started to voice against untouchability by singing which is reflected in his popular songs such as "Biraano yo mandirmaa".

He is also active on social awareness for various issues such as health.
