= Yamini Singh (Bhojpuri actress) =

Indian actress

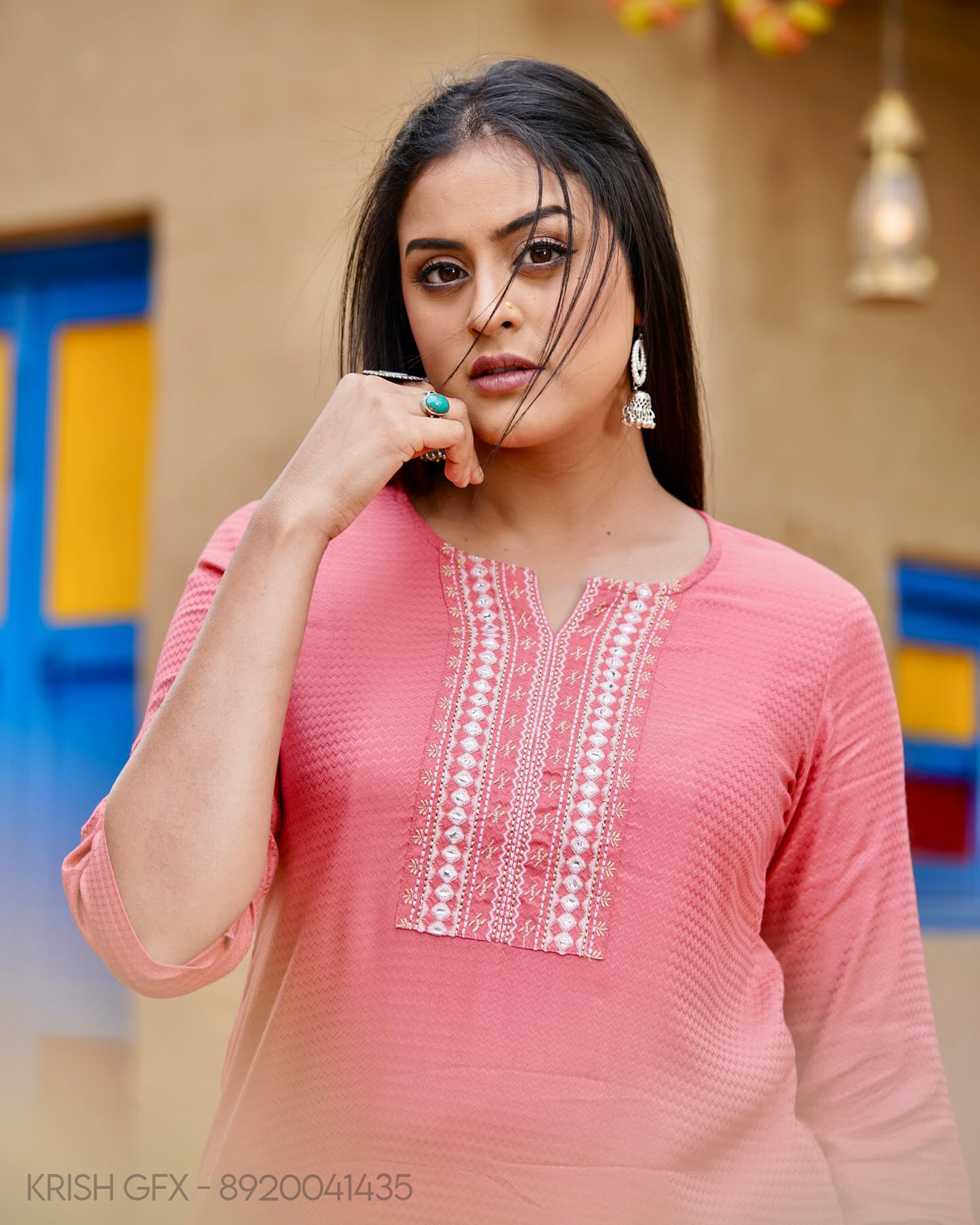
- Indian Actress Yamini in 2025
- Born: 17 May 1996 (age 30); Lucknow, Uttar Pradesh, India
- Occupation: Actress
- Years active: 2018–present
- Height: 1.80 m (5 ft 11 in)

Yamini Singh (born 17 May 1996) is an Indian actress and model, who appears mainly in Bhojpuri films. She made her Bhojpuri debut with 2019 film Patthar Ke Sanam with Arvind Akela Kallu and Awdhesh Mishra.

== Early life and education ==
Yamini Singh was born 17 May 1996 in Lucknow of Uttar Pradesh to mother Sunita Singh. She received primary education from Rani Laxmi Bai Memorial Senior Secondary School. She attend Dr. D.Y. Patil College of Engineering, Pune and attained Engineering degree. She is also a fashion designer.

== Career ==
Singh made her Bhojpuri debut with 2019 film Patthar Ke Sanam opposite Arvind Akela Kallu. She also appeared in Lallu Ki Laila with Dinesh Lal Yadav and Chhaliya with Arvind Akela Kallu.

== Filmography ==
Key
†	Denotes films that have not yet been released

Year	Film	Role	Co-stars	Language	Ref.
2019	Patthar Ke Sanam	Madhuri	Arvind Akela Kallu	Bhojpuri	
2019	Lallu Ki Laila	Kajal	Dinesh Lal Yadav; Amrapali Dubey	Bhojpuri	
2019	Chhaliya		Arvind Akela Kallu	Bhojpuri	
2021	Premgeet		Pradeep Pandey (Chintu)	Bhojpuri	
2021	Pyar To Hona Hi Tha		Arvind Akela Kallu	Bhojpuri	
2021	Sarfarosh		Pravesh Lal Yadav; Ritesh Pandey	Bhojpuri	
2021	Vijeta		Arvind Akela Kallu	Bhojpuri	
2022	Naya Vivah		Gaurav Jha	Bhojpuri	
2022	Note Bandi	Shikha		Bhojpuri	
2023	Saraswati	Saraswati	Anshuman Singh Rajput	Bhojpuri	
2023	Aghori			Bhojpuri	
2024	Purvanchal		Ritesh Pandey	Bhojpuri	
2024	Dulhan to Jayegi Dulhe Raja Ke Saath		Yash Kumarr	Bhojpuri	
2024	Chintu Ki Dulhaniya		Pradeep Pandey Chintu	Bhojpuri	
2024	Avaidh	SP Manjari		Bhojpuri	
