= Inter-caste marriage in India =

Marriages between two people of separate social classifications in India

The inter-caste marriages in India have been gradually gaining acceptance due to increasing education, employment, middle-class economic background, and urbanisation. As of the 2011 census, 5.8% of the marriages in India were inter-caste marriages.

In India, inter-caste marriages were publicly encouraged and supported by the incumbent government under Narendra Modi by the offering of financial encouragement to those who marry people from lower castes. The practice was also promoted by C. N. Annadurai, the former Chief Minister of Tamil Nadu, and social activists such as Periyar E. V. Ramasamy, Raghupathi Venkataratnam Naidu and Manthena Venkata Raju. In the North Indian state of Uttar Pradesh, the Government offers a cash award for inter-caste couples. The Supreme Court of India has also declared that inter-caste marriages are in the national interest and a unifying factor for the nation and there has never been a bar on inter-caste or inter-religion marriages in independent India.

In 2017, the Prime minister Narendra Modi started a scheme in which 2.5 lakh, that is 250,000 rupees will be given to inter-caste couples if one of them is a Dalit.

== Statistics and surveys ==
According to the 2017 Study conducted by the Indian Statistical Institute, inter-caste marriages are more frequent in Rural areas (5.2%) than Urban areas (4.9%). The Survey also found that the inter-caste marriages are more common among poor people (5.9%) than rich people (4.0%).

According to the Studies conducted by the National Council of Applied Economic Research in 2016, about 5% of the marriages in India are inter-caste marriages. Mizoram had the highest number of inter-caste marriages, where about 55% of the marriages were inter-caste marriages and Madhya Pradesh had the lowest number of inter-caste marriages, where only 1% of the marriages were inter-caste marriage.

According to a survey, the education of the husband's mother has a significant effect on inter-caste marriages. The probability of inter-caste marriages was found to increase by 36% with a 10-year increase in education of the husband's mother.

In a 2010 report, the National Commission for Women (NCW) documented 326 cases of honour crime in the past year, the majority of which were due to inter-caste marriages.

== See also ==
- Caste system in India
- Endogamy
- Hypergamy
- Inter-caste marriage in Nepal
- Jāti
