= Hum Angrezon Ke Zamane Ke Jailor Hai =

2026 Indian Hindi-language film

- Directed by: Rakesh Sawant
- Written by: Dilip Mishra; Nisar Akhtar
- Screenplay by: Dilip Mishra; Nisar Akhtar
- Story by: Rakesh Sawant
- Produced by: Shweta Chauhan; Bhanwar Singh Pundir; Rakesh Sawant
- Starring: Asrani; Bhanwar Singh Pundir; Milind Gunaji; Zarina Wahab; Raksha Gupta; Muskan Verma; Vishnu Sharma; Abhinav Chauhan; Mushtaq Khan
- Production companies: Jaya Films; Gajanan Motion Movies
- Release date: 19 June 2026
- Running time: 120 minutes
- Country: India
- Language: Hindi

Hum Angrezon Ke Zamane Ke Jailor Hai is a 2026 Indian Hindi-language drama thriller film directed by Rakesh Sawant and produced by Shweta Chauhan, Bhanwar Singh Pundir and Rakesh Sawant. The film stars Asrani, Bhanwar Singh Pundir, Milind Gunaji, Zarina Wahab, Raksha Gupta, Muskan Verma, Vishnu Sharma, Abhinav Chauhan and Mushtaq Khan.

== Plot ==
The film revolves around the lives of Thakur Vishwajeet Singh and his wife Sawatei, whose family conflicts gradually take a dangerous turn. As hidden truths emerge and tensions rise, the story develops into a murder mystery involving suspense and unexpected revelations. The investigation is led by Inspector Dev and Inspector Rana, who attempt to uncover the truth while navigating through multiple layers of mystery. Set against the backdrop of Uttarakhand, the film combines drama with elements of suspense and commercial entertainment.

== Cast ==
- Asrani as Inspector Dev
- Bhanwar Singh Pundir as Inspector Rana
- Milind Gunaji as Thakur Vishwajeet Singh
- Zarina Wahab as Sawatei
- Raksha Gupta as Monika
- Muskan Verma as Swati
- Vishnu Sharma as Minister
- Abhinav Chauhan as College Boy Anand
- Mushtaq Khan as Munshi Mama

== Production ==
The film was produced under the banners of Jaya Films and Gajanan Motion Movies. Rakesh Sawant directed the film and also developed the story. The screenplay and dialogues were written by Dilip Mishra and Nisar Akhtar.

== Release ==
Hum Angrezo Ke Zamane Ke Jailer Hain was released theatrically on 19 June 2026.

== Critical reception ==
The Film Information review was very critical of the film, faulting the film's story in particular as basic with significant plot holes. Alt Bollywood gave a scathing review, calling the film unwatchable due to a bad script and production values. Like the Film Information review, it noted that this film's title comes from dialog in the iconic 1975 film Sholay, but there is no real connection or influence from Sholay.
