= Faraaz Khan =

Indian actor (1970–2020)

- Born: 27 May 1970; Mumbai, India
- Died: 4 November 2020 (aged 50); Bangalore, India
- Occupation: Actor
- Years active: 1996–2008
- Known for: Fareb, Mehndi, Achanak 37 Saal Baad
- Father: Yusuf Khan
- Relatives: Fahmaan Khan (brother)

Faraaz Abousher (27 May 1970 – 4 November 2020) was an Indian actor of Egyptian descent who worked in Hindi films. He was seen in some of the Bollywood movies and television serials in the late 1990s and early 2000s. His notable films include Fareb and Mehndi. He has also appeared in television serials such as Achanak 37 Saal Baad and Lipstick. He was the son of actor Yusuf Khan.

== Career ==
Khan was almost signed for his debut lead role in the 1989 musical-romance Maine Pyar Kiya, but he fell seriously ill before shooting began, and so was replaced by Salman Khan. He made his acting debut in Vikram Bhatt's 1996 film Fareb opposite Suman Ranganathan and Milind Gunaji. He played the villain opposite Sunil Shetty in Prithvi (1997) and appeared opposite Rani Mukerji in Mehndi (1998). In total he appeared in 7 films and made his last film appearance in the 2005 film Chand Bujh Gaya. Since the early 2000s, he shifted to television appearing in series like Achanak 37 Saal Baad, Lipstick and several episodes of the horror anthology series Ssshhhh...Koi Hai. His last acting role was in the 2008 series Neeli Aankhen. Since 2008, he was inactive from the film and television industry. He died at the age of 50 from neurological disorder on 4 November 2020 in Bangalore, after a year of chest infection.

== Filmography ==
- Fareb (1996) – Dr. Rohit Verma
- Prithvi (1997) – Vinod Kumar
- Mehndi (1998) – Niranjan Chaudhary
- Dulhan Banoo Main Teri (1999) – Deepak Rai
- Dil Ne Phir Yaad Kiya (2001) – Sanjeev Verma
- Bazaar: Market of Love, Lust and Desire (2004)
- Chand Bujh Gaya (2005) – Adarsh

=== Television ===
- 1997 One Plus One
- 2002 Lipstick as Abhay Ahuja
- 2002 – 2003 Achanak 37 Saal Baad as Ajay
- 2004 Aakrosh as Ranjeet Saxena
- 2004 Ssshhhh...Koi Hai as Singar
- 2004–2005 Raat Hone Ko Hai as Various characters
- 2005 Kareena Kareena
- 2006 Sinndoor Tere Naam Ka as Dr. Shantanu Sengupta
- 2008 Neeli Aankhen as Inspector Vivek Kapoor
