= Achanak =

Achanak may refer to:

- Achanak (1973 film), 1973 Indian Hindi-language film directed by Gulzar
- Achanak (1998 film), 1998 Indian Hindi-language film
- Achanak (band), a British bhangra band
- Achanak 37 Saal Baad, Indian Hindi-language horror TV series
