= The UP Files =

- Directed by: Neeraj Sahai
- Written by: Stanish Gill
- Produced by: Kuldeep Umraosingh Ostwal
- Starring: Manoj Joshi; Manjari Fadnis; Poonam Dwivedi; Milind Gunaji; Ali Asgar; Shahbaz Khan; Aman Verma; Avtar Gill
- Production company: Shree Ostwal Films
- Distributed by: UFO Moviez
- Release date: 26 July 2024
- Country: India
- Language: Hindi

The UP Files is a 2024 Indian political drama film produced by Kuldeep Umraosingh Ostwal and directed by Neeraj Sahai. The film stars Manoj Joshi, Poonam Dwivedi, Manjari Fadnis, and Milind Gunaji. The film was released on 26 July 2024.The UP Files is presented as inspired by true events.

== Premise ==
Abhay Singh is elected as the Chief Minister of Uttar Pradesh (UP), the most populous state in India. The film chronicles the challenges Singh faces as he attempts to govern the state and implement his vision.

== Cast ==
- Manoj Joshi as Abhay Singh, the Chief Minister of Uttar Pradesh, based on Yogi Adityanath
- Manjari Fadnis as Sujata Menon (Inspector)
- Poonam Dwivedi as Razia
- Milind Gunaji
- Ali Asgar
- Ashok Samarth
- Anil George
- Shahbaz Khan
- Aman Verma
- Vineet Sharma
- Avtar Gill
- Vaibhav Mathur

== Release ==
The announced release date for The UP Files was postponed from 12 July 2024 to 26 July.

== Reception ==
A review in Times Now News concluded, "While The UP Files succeeds in presenting a realistic portrayal of political life, it occasionally leans into melodrama, which might detract from its overall impact. Nonetheless, it remains a thought-provoking watch, offering a behind-the-scenes look at the challenges and triumphs of political leadership in contemporary India." The Times of India was much more negative and stated, "The film's lack of story and jerky pacing undermine its intent to showcase a powerful CM and the impact of effective leadership. Its failure to craft a compelling narrative and reliance on formulaic tropes also overshadow its positive intentions, making it a missed opportunity to explore meaningful themes and ideas." while FIlm Information called it a "propaganda film".
