= Milind Gunaji =

Indian actor and television presenter

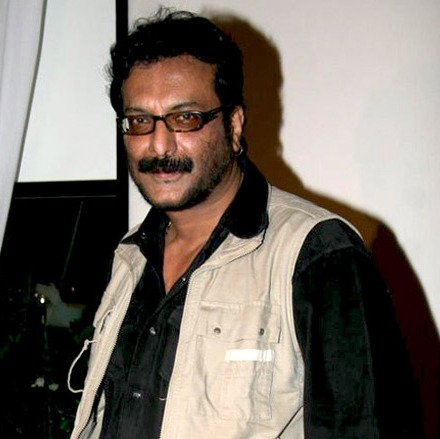
- Milind Gunaji in 2012
- Born: 23 July 1961 (age 65); Mumbai, Maharashtra, India
- Occupations: Actor; writer; model; television presenter; author
- Years active: 1993–present
- Spouse: Rani Gunaji (m. 1990)

Milind Gunaji (born 23 July 1961) is an Indian actor, model, television presenter, writer and author, most known for his roles in Marathi and Hindi cinema. He made his first film appearance in 1993's Papeeha and has since performed in over 250 films and acted as the host of the Zee Marathi channel travel show Bhatkanti. Gunaji has served as the Government of Maharashtra's brand ambassador for forests and wildlife. Currently, he is the brand ambassador for Hill Station Mahabaleshwar.

== Career ==
Gunaji was born on 23 July 1961 in Bombay (present-day Mumbai), Maharashtra. Gunaji initially began acting in the 1993 film Papeeha and first gained widespread notice in the 1996's Fareb in the role of Inspector Indrajeet Saxena. The role earned him a Filmfare Award nomination for Best Performance in a Negative Role.

In 2009, he was named the brand ambassador for the Novel Institute Group's NIBR College of Hotel Management. Milind did Everest, which aired on StarPlus November 2014. He has also made a brief appearance in South Indian cinema, playing important roles in two movies Aalavandhan (Tamil) and Krishnam Vande Jagadgurum (Telugu).

Gunaji has held many solo photo exhibitions as a photographer, including in Balgandharva Pune, Kalidas Hall in Nashik, Prabodhankar Thackeray Hall in Vile Parle among others.

He has served as a travel writer, brand ambassador of Intiamatkat Tours and writes a weekly column in the Lokprabha supplement of the Marathi daily Loksatta. As an author, Gunaji has penned 12 books. In 1998, he published his first book, Majhi Mulukhgiri, a compilation of his Lokprabha columns. Gunaji has modeled, stating that it "satisfies my ego and gives good monetary returns."

== Filmography ==
=== Films ===
Year	Title	Role	Language	Notes
1993	Droh Kaal	Shiv	Hindi	
1993	Papeeha	Kabir Sagar	Hindi	
1995	Daughters of This Century	Goluk	Hindi	
1996	Fareb	Inspector Indrajeet Saxena	Hindi	
1997	Koi Kisise Kum Nahin	Ajay	Hindi	
1997	Salma Pe Dil Aa Gaya	Dilawar Khan	Hindi	
1997	Do Rahain	Rajjappa	Hindi	
1997	Virasat	Bali Thakur	Hindi	
1998	Sarkarnama	Kumar Deshmukh	Marathi	
1998	Hazaar Chaurasi Ki Maa	Saroj Pal	Hindi	
1998	Zor	Iqbal Khan	Hindi	
1999	Zulmi	Nihal	Hindi	
1999	Trishakti	Commando Bajrang	Hindi	
1999	Godmother	Veeram	Hindi	
2000	Jodidar	Manohar Deshmukh	Marathi	
2000	Jis Desh Mein Ganga Rehta Hain	Milind	Hindi	
2001	Aalavandhan	Col. Santosh Kumar	Tamil	
2001	Abhay	Col. Santosh Kumar	Hindi	
2002	Ansh: The Deadly Part	Babu Bakshi	Hindi	
2002	Devdas	Kali	Hindi	
2002	Mulaqaat	Akhtar Khan	Hindi	
2003	LOC Kargil	Major Rajesh Adhau	Hindi	
2004	Aan: Men at Work	Ajit Pradhan	Hindi	
2004	Dev	Mangal Rao	Hindi	
2004	Asambhav	Ansari	Hindi	
2005	Dhamkee	Guru Sawant	Hindi	
2005	Taj Mahal: An Eternal Love Story	Mahabat Khan	Hindi	
2005	Balu	-	Telugu	Cameo appearance
2005	Sarivar Sari	Piyush	Marathi	
2005	Fareb	Advocate Milind Mehta	Hindi	
2006	Manthan: Ek Amrut Pyala	Avinash Deshpande	Marathi	
2006	Jigyaasa	Subhash Desai	Hindi	
2006	Phir Hera Pheri	Nanjibhai	Hindi	
2006	Come December	Dr. Suresh Shah	Hindi	
2006	Betrayed By Passion	Thomas Varghese	English	
2008	Black & White	Hamid	Hindi	
2008	Humne Jeena Seekh Liya	Professor Akil Karin	Hindi	
2009	Mudrank: The Stamp	Politician Pote	Hindi	
2009	Yeh Mera India	Ashfaq	Hindi	
2009	The Hero - Abhimanyu	SP Arjun Singh	Hindi	
2009	Lagli Paij	Magician Abraham	Marathi	
2010	Ek Shodh	Detective	Hindi	
2010	To the London Calling	Rajvansh	Hindi	
2010	Khatta Meeta	Suhas Vichare	Hindi	
2011	Karthik	Karthik's Father	Kannada	
2011	Singularity	Shiv	English	
2011	Om Allah	Saibaba	Hindi	
2012	Krishnam Vande Jagadgurum	Chakravarthy	Telugu	
2012	Sambha	-	Hindi	Cameo appearance
2013	Lek Ladki	Minar's Father	Marathi	
2013	Rab Ton Sohna Ishq	-	Punjabi	
2013	Psycho	Meera's Father	Hindi	
2013	Kamasutra: The Revenge	The Mighty King	Hindi	
2014	Than Than Gopal	Mr. Sawant	Marathi	
2014	Rege	Samar Khan	Marathi	
2014	M3 - Midsummer Midnight Mumbai	Police Commissioner	Hindi	
2015	Karbonn	-	Hindi	Cameo appearance
2015	Saankal	Apoorva Singh Bhati	Hindi	
2015	Mudrank: The Stamp	-	Hindi	Special appearance
2016	Kaul Manacha	Dr. Ratnakar Narlikar	Marathi	
2016	Prem Kahani - Ek Lapleli Goshta	Sonal's Father	Marathi	
2017	Ek Maratha Lakh Maratha	Chhatrapati Shivaji Maharaj	Marathi	
2017	Mandi: Ek Prem Katha	Thakur Bijendra Singh	Marathi	
2017	The Ghazi Attack	RAW Agent Girish Kumar	Hindi; Telugu	
2017	Babuji Ek Ticket Bambai	-	Hindi	
2017	Gautamiputra Satakarni	Kanji	Telugu	
2017	Oxygen	Chandra Prakash	Telugu	
2017	Okkadu Migiladu	Education Minister	Telugu	
2018	Race 3	Ranchod Singh	Hindi	
2019	The Warrior Queen of Jhansi	Gangadhar Rao	English	
2019	Panipat	Dattaji Rao Scindia	Hindi	
2019	Liitle Gandhi	Anurag Gandhi	Hindi	
2022	Goshta Eka Paithanichi	Inamdar	Marathi	
2022	Rashtra	Ranjeet	Marathi	
2022	Bhool Bhulaiyaa 2	Thakur Vijender Singh Rathore	Hindi	
2022	HIT: The First Case	Inspector Ibrahim	Hindi	
2023	The Rise of Sudarshan Chakra	Sardar	Hindi	
2024	Saajish The Conspiracy	Fanne Khan	Hindi	
2024	Political War	Abdulla	Hindi	
2024	The UP Files	Shadab	Hindi	
2024	Nennekkaduna	Religious Leader	Telugu	
2025	Saako 363	Deewana Bhandari	Hindi	
2025	Love Karu Ya Shadi	Col. Ajit Singh	Hindi	
2026	Hum Angrezo Ke Zamane Ke Jailer Hain	Inspector Dev	Hindi	
2026	Public Kaa Hero	Hamja	Hindi	
TBA	The Battle of Bhima Koregaon	TBA		

=== Television ===
- 1997: Byomkesh Bakshi (TV series) (Episode: Sahi Ka Kanta) as Debashish
- 2002: CID (Indian TV series) (Episode 197,198/ the case of blackmail victim) - Johnny (Main culprit)
- 2006–2009: Dharti Ka Veer Yodha Prithviraj Chauhan – Vijaypal
- 2008-2010: Kulvadhu - Ranvir Rajeshirke / Bhaiyyasaheb
- 2011–2012: Veer Shivaji – Jagirdar Shahaji Raje Bhosale
- 2012–2013: Hum Ne Li Hai... Shapath – ACP Pratap Yashwantrao Teje
- 3 November 2014 - 1 March 2015: Everest – Colonel Arun Abhyankar
- 2013-2015: Khwabo Ke Darmiyan - Aastha's father
- Bhatkanti and Discover Maharashtra on Zee Marathi
- 2022 Rudra: The Edge Of Darkness on Disney+ Hotstar

== Works ==
- Majhi Mulukhagiri (1998)
- Bhatkanti (2001)
- Chala Mazya Govyala (2003)
- Offbeat Tracks in Maharashtra (2003)
- Chanderi Bhatkanti (2005)
- Gudha Ramya Maharashtra (2007)
- Mystical Magical Maharashtra (2009)
- A Travel Guide Offbeat Tracks in Maharashtra (2009)
- Anwat (2011)
- Meri Avismarniya Yatra (2011)
- Gad Killyanchi Bhatkanti (2011)
- Hawai Mulukhgiri (2013)

== Awards and nominations ==
- 1997: Nominated: Filmfare Best Villain Award for Fareb
- 1998: Nominated: Filmfare Best Villain Award for Virasat
