= Mehndi (1998 film) =

- DVD cover
- Directed by: Hamid Ali Khan
- Written by: Iqbal Durrani (dialogue)
- Screenplay by: Iqbal Durrani
- Story by: Iqbal Durrani
- Produced by: Salim Akhtar; Shama Akhtar
- Starring: Rani Mukherji; Faraaz Khan
- Cinematography: Akram Khan
- Edited by: Waman Bhosle
- Music by: Babul Bose
- Production company: Aftab Pictures Pvt. Ltd.
- Release date: 13 November 1998
- Country: India
- Language: Hindi

Mehndi is a 1998 Indian Hindi-language drama film written and directed by Hamid Ali Khan. It stars Rani Mukerji and Faraaz Khan.

== Plot ==
Pooja is Niranjan's new wife. She comes from a middle-class family. The first days pass happily. Niranjan decides to launch a factory and asks money from his father-in-law. But Pooja opposes the will. It reveals that Niranjan is in the habit of visiting brothels. His other family members regularly torture Pooja, Her mother-in-law curses Pooja saying her son faces hardships due to her. Niranjan is arrested by the police on the charge of murder and sentenced to death. That night a mysterious man visits their house and says he will stop Niranjan's hanging only if Pooja agrees to spend a night with him. To save her husband's life, Pooja unwillingly agrees but the man does nothing with her. Niranjan is released from jail and his mother turns him against Pooja. Niranjan and his family expel Pooja from the house, calling her "characterless" for spending the night with the unknown man. Thereafter Pooja's divorce case goes to the court. Her in-laws even insult her father and sister. Pooja's father is murdered by Pooja's sister-in-law's husband in the court. Pooja and her sister are distraught. She circles her father's funeral pyre and vows to destroy the home which destroyed her life. She provokes her sister-in-law's husband in court and he tries to shoot her but she kills him. Pooja gradually destroys her in-laws. Niranjan and his family try to burn Pooja alive but Pooja saves herself and shoots Niranjan. Her in-laws and a dying Niranjan ask her for forgiveness.

== Cast ==
- Rani Mukerji as Advocate Pooja Chaudhary
- Faraaz Khan as Niranjan Chaudhary
- Shakti Kapoor as Banne Miyaan
- Pramod Moutho as Mr. Chaudhary
- Himani Shivpuri as Mrs. Chaudhary
- Mahavir Shah as Ankush Choudhary
- Arjun as Biloo
- Shahbaz Khan as Rajeshwar
- Asrani as Tolanii
- Yunus Parvez as Judge Mrityujay Saxena
- Gulshan Grover as Sikh Truck Driver Rakesh Singh
- Raza Murad as Seth Vikram Das
- Mary Gul Khan as Marjaan

== Soundtrack ==
All lyrics are written by Rani Malik; all music is composed by Babul Bose.

Songs
No.	Title	Playback	Length
1.	"Baba Ki Bitiya"	Anuradha Paudwal
2.	"Dulhan Koi Jab"	Sadhana Sargam
3.	"Mohabbat Main Duniya"	Udit Narayan, Sadhana Sargam
4.	"Parody"	Mohammed Aziz, Poornima
5.	"Sach Puchho"	Kumar Sanu
6.	"Tum To Pardesi Ho"	Kavita Krishnamurthy
7.	"Yeh Meri Sasural"	Shabbir Kumar, Poornima
