= Fareb (1996 film) =

- Film poster
- Directed by: Vikram Bhatt
- Written by: Iqbal Durrani
- Based on: Unlawful Entry by Lewis Colick
- Produced by: Mukesh Bhatt
- Starring: Faraaz Khan; Suman Ranganathan; Milind Gunaji
- Cinematography: Ashok Bahl
- Edited by: Waman Bhonsle
- Music by: Jatin–Lalit
- Production company: Vishesh Films
- Distributed by: Zee Studios
- Release date: 28 June 1996
- Running time: 139 minutes
- Country: India
- Language: Hindi

Fareb (transl. Deceit) is a 1996 Indian Hindi-language psychological thriller film directed by Vikram Bhatt. The film features newcomers Faraaz Khan and Suman Ranganathan in lead roles with Milind Gunaji as the antagonist. Released on 28 June 1996, the film was a commercial success. The film is an unofficial remake of 1992 American film Unlawful Entry.

== Plot ==
The film opens with Dr. Rohan Verma (Faraaz Khan) at the apex of his professional life—a brilliant, dedicated surgeon who receives a prestigious gold medal and a promotion to Chief Surgeon at a top Bombay hospital. He and his beautiful, soft-spoken wife, Suman (Suman Ranganathan), a compassionate schoolteacher, move into a sprawling, isolated bungalow—the physical manifestation of their hard-earned success.

However, beneath the surface of this ideal union lurks an unhealed, festering wound. A year prior, while Rohan was chained to an emergency surgery at the hospital, Suman suffered a devastating miscarriage completely alone. Though Rohan was saving another life, Suman harbors deep, unspoken resentment over his emotional and physical absence during her most vulnerable moment. Rohan, drowning in professional guilt, tries to overcompensate with material comforts, but the emotional chasm between them remains dangerously papered over.

The Intrusion and The "Savior"

Their fragile peace is shattered when a burglar breaks into their home. Though the thief escapes, the couple is rattled. Enter Inspector Indrajeet "Inder" Saxena (Milind Gunaji) and his subordinate, Inspector Sule (Vishwajeet Pradhan). Inder is deceptively charming—a rugged, commanding officer who treats the case with an unsettling personal fervor.

The manipulation begins subtly. Days later, drugs are mysteriously planted in Suman’s handbag at her school. Just as the principal is about to call the police, Inder arrives with Sule, effectively arresting Suman. He plays the "bad cop" to Sule's "worse cop," terrifying Suman before dramatically revealing that the peon planted the drugs and has "confessed." Suman is overwhelmed with gratitude. Rohan, feeling powerless for having failed to protect her again, insists they invite Inder to dinner to thank him—a fatal social error.

The Psychological Coup

At dinner, Inder’s predatory nature emerges under the guise of male bonding. He casually touches Suman’s belongings, lingers too long on her photographs, and subtly interrogates their history. When Suman mentions the miscarriage, Inder’s eyes gleam—he has found the psychological lever. He begins an insidious campaign to position himself as the "true" protector. He tells Suman, "A real man prioritizes his wife over his patients," weaponizing her trauma against Rohan.

Inder escalates by taking Rohan to a local underworld den and brutally executing the burglar who broke into their home, coldly firing a bullet into the man's head in front of Rohan. Horrified, Rohan finally recognizes the psychopath behind the badge and warns Suman. But Inder has already planted his seeds. When Rohan accuses Inder of being obsessed, Suman dismisses it as male jealousy and ungratefulness. The gaslighting is complete—Rohan is now the paranoid, insecure husband, while Inder is the steadfast, reliable officer.

The Systematic Annihilation of Dr. Rohan Verma

Realizing Suman is slipping away, Inder weaponizes the state's machinery. He has Rohan framed in a fabricated narcotics case, arresting him in his own driveway. He confiscates Rohan's car, cuts the phone and electricity lines to the bungalow, leaving Suman physically and digitally isolated.

While Rohan languishes in a cell, Inder visits the terrified Suman under the pretense of "protection." He escalates his physical proximity, cornering her, and confesses his obsession, stating that he, not Rohan, deserves her because he would never abandon her. To silence the only other witness to his true nature, Inder murders the prostitute he used for the drug frame-up. He then coldly executes his own partner, Inspector Sule, when Sule starts questioning his erratic behavior—proving that Inder will burn down the entire system to possess Suman.

The Desperate Escape and Bloody Reckoning

In jail, Rohan knows time is running out. Using his medical expertise, he fakes a severe cardiac arrhythmia to get transferred to the hospital wing. He violently overpowers the guards and escapes, racing back to his bungalow.

Meanwhile, Inder breaks into the house. Suman’s friend, Neeta (who had come to stay with her), tries to intervene, but Inder brutally murders her. A terrified Suman finally sees the full, monstrous reality. Inder pursues her through the darkened house, hurling vitriol about how Rohan is a "failure" as a man, and attempts to rape her.

Just as Inder pins Suman down, a battered, bleeding Rohan bursts in. A vicious, primal fistfight erupts—surgeon versus predator. Though Rohan is outmatched in brute force, Inder draws his service revolver and shoots Rohan point-blank. As Inder turns his attention back to Suman, Rohan—with his last ounces of adrenaline—uses a shard of broken glass to stab Inder in the back, disarms him, and empties the revolver into his chest.

The Aftermath

The film closes not with triumphant music, but with the harrowing image of Rohan and Suman clutching each other amidst the shattered glass and blood of their home. The siege is over, but so is their innocence. Inder is dead, but the price is steep—Rohan is gravely wounded, an innocent friend is dead, and the couple must now live with the trauma of a system that not only failed them but actively preyed upon them. In the final frame, they hold each other not just in relief, but in the silent, chilling knowledge that the "deceit" (fareb) of the title wasn't just Inder's—it was the illusion of safety itself.

== Cast ==
- Faraaz Khan as Dr. Rohan Verma.
- Suman Ranganathan as Suman Verma.
- Milind Gunaji as Inspector Indrajeet Saxena.
- Vishwajeet Pradhan as Inspector Sule.
- Makrand Deshpande as Thief.
- Kunickaa Sadanand as Prostitute Vrinda.
- Ashok Lath as Vishal (lawyer).
- Sunil Dhawan.
- Divya Jaiswal as Neeta.

== Soundtrack ==
The soundtrack is composed by Jatin–Lalit, with lyrics by Neeraj and Indeevar. The music of this movie was huge hit, especially track like "Aankhon Se Dil Mein Utar Ke" & "Yeh Teri Aankhen Jhuki Jhuki" etc.

Track #	Song	Singer(s)	Duration	Lyrics
1	"Aankhon Se Dil Mein Utar Ke"	Kumar Sanu, Alka Yagnik	05:55	Neeraj
2	"O Hum Safar"	Alka Yagnik	06:36	Neeraj
3	"O Hum Safar Dil Ke Nagar"	Udit Narayan, Alka Yagnik	06:37	Neeraj
4	"Pyar Ka Pehla Pehla"	Kumar Sanu, Alka Yagnik	05:00	Neeraj
5	"Pyar Ka Milna"	Abhijeet Bhattacharya, Udit Narayan	04:13	Indeevar
6	"Yeh Teri Aankhen Jhuki Jhuki"	Abhijeet Bhattacharya	03:21	Indeevar
