= Lipstick (TV series) =

Indian drama television series

- Created by: Rose Audio Visuals
- Written by: Shobhaa De; Sajeev Kapoor
- Directed by: Bhushan Patel
- Starring: see below
- Opening theme: Lipstick by Gayatri / Sagarika
- Country of origin: India
- Original language: Hindi
- No. of episodes: 382

Production
- Producers: Goldie Behl and Shrishti Arya
- Running time: approx. 23 minutes

Original release
- Network: Zee TV
- Release: 9 September 2002 – 4 July 2004

Lipstick is a Hindi language Indian television series, produced by Rose Movies that premiered on Zee TV on 9 September 2002. The story unveils how best friends can turn into enemies in the pursuit of love and success.

== Plot ==
The story revolves around the lives of two women, Sheetal and Suniti, set in the backdrop of a corporate war between two publishing houses. The story opens with cut-throat competition between two publishing houses - UPC and Hands. Their film magazines 'Darpan' and 'Lipstick' are run by Sheetal and Suniti, respectively. While Suniti believes in giving only true stories to her readers, Sheetal fabricates and sensationalizes stories to give positive publicity to film stars and earn their favour.

== Cast ==
- Shweta Salve as Suniti Verma (Before Plastic Surgery)
- Gautami Kapoor as Suniti Verma (After Plastic Surgery)
- Nigaar Khan as Sheetal Singhania
- Krutika Desai Khan as Roopali Roopchand
- Faraaz Khan / Alyy Khan as Abhay Ahuja
- Vinay Jain
- Dimple Inamdar as Suman
- Vaquar Shaikh as Suman's Husband
- Sagar Arya / Rakesh Thareja / Vishal Singh as Tarun Singhania
- Sadiya Siddiqui as Meera Ahuja
- Grusha Kapoor as Jasmine Khurana
- Shweta Gulati as Tara
- Anita Wahi as Rohini Singhania
- Shishir Sharma as Jagan Luthra
- Rajeev Verma as Vijay Singhania
- Zahida Parveen as Vaishali
- Aparna Tarakad as Minnie
- Usha Bachani as Shabnam Sikander
- Bobby Khanna as Deepak
- Manish Khanna as Dinesh Chopra
- Rishi Khurana as Bablu
- Kavita Rathod as Kanchan Kumari
- Bhisham Mansukhani as Vishal Khanna
- Smita Haya as Anita Chopra
- Mithilesh Chaturvedi as Vikrant Kumar Khanna
- Parineeta Borthakur as UPC's Employee
- Ananya Chatterjee as Nisha
- Amit Sarin as Jagdish
- Rasik Dave as Vivek
- Anand Khanolkar as Ravi Bhatnagar
- Kanika Maheshwari
