= Prithvi (1997 film) =

- DVD Cover
- Directed by: Nitin Manmohan
- Written by: shahrulh khan
- Produced by: Nitin Manmohan; Mukul S. Anand; Sunil Manchanda
- Starring: Sunil Shetty; Shilpa Shetty
- Cinematography: Harmeet Singh
- Edited by: A. Muthu
- Music by: Viju Shah
- Production company: Neha Arts
- Release date: 29 August 1997 (India)
- Running time: 136 minutes
- Country: India
- Language: Hindi
- Budget: ₹5 crore
- Box office: ₹ 10.68 crore ( Indian collection)

Prithvi is a 1997 Indian Hindi-language mystery film starring Sunil Shetty, Shilpa Shetty (in double role), Shakti Kapoor, Suresh Oberoi, Faraaz Khan, and Shweta Menon. The actual director of the film was Deepak Shivdasani, but Nithin Manmohan asked him to leave the film and took his place as director. This is the first film of Suniel Shetty with Shilpa, and the only film of Faraz Khan with Suniel Shetty as the villain. Shilpa Shetty appeared for the second time in a double role after Main Khiladi Tu Anari.

== Cast ==
- Sunil Shetty as Prithvi
- Shilpa Shetty as Rashmi / Neha (dual roles)
- Faraaz Khan as V. K. Aka Vinod Kumar
- Shweta Menon as Lucky
- Karminder Kaur as Vinod Henchwoman
- Shakti Kapoor as Dabu/Bellboy/Indian Embassy Staff/Club Waiter/Mental Patient/Sikh Man/Transgender (seven roles)
- Suresh Oberoi as Dhanraj
- Navin Nischol as Rashmi's father
- Viju Khote as Movie Director

== Summary ==
Prithvi (Sunil Shetty), a famous photographer, and Neha (Shilpa Shetty) fall in love and soon get married. Prithvi and Neha both fly to America for their honeymoon, but when Neha uses the bathroom at a restaurant, she gets kidnapped. Prithvi is really worried and would do anything to get Neha back. He takes the help of Lucky (Shweta Menon). When Prithvi was near a hospital, he finds Neha, but she had fainted. But once she wakes up, she does not recognize Prithvi. The girl he found was, in fact, a duplicate of Neha, whose name was Rashmi. Neha was threatened by her kidnapper, Vinod Kumar aka V.K. (Faraaz Khan), as she should prove him innocent of a murder case. Prithvi and Rashmi rush to the court and say that he is not innocent and has gotten a duplicate of the girl. Prithvi finds Neha, kills Vinod, and they both live happily ever after.

== Soundtrack ==
"Jis Ghadi Tujhko Tere", Anuradha's version, was very popular, but this song is available only on the audio track, not in the movie. "Een Meen Sade Teen" is partly lifted from Rendezvous 2' by Jeanne Mitchell Jarre. The soundtrack also included 3 bonus songs composed by Sukhwinder Singh, none of which featured in the film.

Title	Singer(s)	Music director(s)	Lyricist(s)
"Jis Ghadi Tujhko"	Udit Narayan, Sadhana Sargam	Viju Shah	Jalees Sherwani
"Mera Dil De Diya"	Udit Narayan, Kavita Krishnamurthy	Viju Shah	Nitin Raikwar
"Een Meen Sade Teen"	Udit Narayan, Alka Yagnik	Viju Shah	Nitin Raikwar
"Jis Ghadi Tujhko"	Anuradha Paudwal, Kumar Sanu	Viju Shah	Jalees Sherwani
"Jis Ghadi Tujhko" (Remix)	Kumar Sanu	Viju Shah	Jalees Sherwani
"Hai Rabba"	Anuradha Paudwal	Viju Shah	Deepak Chaudhury
"Chand Aadhi Raat Hai"	Udit Narayan, Anuradha Paudwal	Sukhwinder Singh	Azeez Jalandhar
"Prem Granth Mein Geet Hain"	Nitin Mukesh, Anuradha Paudwal	Sukhwinder Singh	Madan Pal
"Rang Hai Pheeke Ghata Kya Hai"	Sonu Nigam, Anuradha Paudwal	Sukhwinder Singh	Madan Pal

== Critical reception ==
Anupama Chopra of India Today called it a "passable fare". K.N. Vijiyan of New Straits Times opined that the film "is not all that bad".
