= Dulhan Banoo Main Teri =

Dulhan Banoo Mein Teri
- Directed by: B. Subhash
- Produced by: B. Subhash
- Starring: Faraaz Khan; Deepti Bhatnagar; Arun Bakshi; Beena; Dalip Tahil; Johnny Lever; Roger Moore
- Music by: Raam Laxman
- Distributed by: MGM; United Artists
- Release date: 9 July 1999
- Running time: 147 minutes
- Country: India
- Language: Hindi

Dulhan Banoo Mein Teri is a 1999 Indian romantic drama film produced and directed by B. Subhash. The film stars Faraaz Khan and Deepti Bhatnagar in lead roles.

== Synopsis ==
Deepak Raj, son of a London-based NRI Kuldeep Rai and Kashi, visits India with his friend little Jack, a music composer, where he meets Radha, a simple flower girl. They fall in love but are thwarted by Minister Sukhdev and Rustogi both friends of Kuldeep Rai.

== Cast ==
- Faraaz Khan as Deepak Raj
- Deepti Bhatnagar as Radha "Rani"
- Dalip Tahil as Kuldeep Rai
- Beena as Kashi
- Johnny Lever as Jack
- Raj Kiran as Koushi
- Pramod Moutho as Minister Sukhdev
- Arun Bakshi as Rustogi

== Soundtrack ==
#	Title	Singer(s)
1	"Dulhan Banoo Main Teri"	Sapna Awasthi
2	"Rabba Tera Shukaar Manaon"	Lata Mangeshkar, Udit Narayan, Vinod Rathod
3	"Jadugar Jadugar" (Duet)	Udit Narayan, Kavita Krishnamurthy
4	"Yaar Ka Paigham"	Yogita Bali, Sapna Awasthi
5	"Woh Roi Hogi"	Shankar Mahadevan, Ehsaan
6	"Jadugar Jadugar" (Female)	Kavita Krishnamurthy
7	"Oh Jaanam"	Hema Sardesai
8	"Mere Man Main Hai"	Kavita Krishnamurthy
9	"Hare Krishna"	Kavita Krishnamurthy
