= Pramod Moutho =

Indian actor

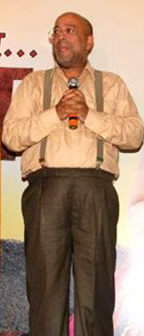
- Pramod Moutho in 2010
- Born: Pramod Sharma; 7 May 1955 (age 71); Kapurthala, Punjab, India
- Other name: Pramod Muthu
- Occupation: actor
- Years active: 1989-2019

Pramod Moutho (Pramod Sharma; born 7 May 1955) is an Indian film and television actor. He has appeared as a villain in number of noted Bollywood films, like Khalnayak (1993), Dilwale (1994), Raja Hindustani (1996), Mehndi (1998), Gadar (2001) and Jodhaa Akbar (2008) and over 120 other Hindi movies.

== Biography ==
Born on 7 May 1955 in Kapurthala, East Punjab, India into a Punjabi Brahmin family as Pramod Sharma, Moutho started acting in stage plays while studying in NJSA Government College, Kapurthala. He, along with Lalit Behl, Satish Sharma, Ravi Deep and Harjeet Walia staged plays. As a college student, Pramod used to play the Mouth Organ with prowess. That is how his friends and recipients of his skill gave him the name Moutho. He got his diploma from the Department of Indian Theatre.

== Career ==
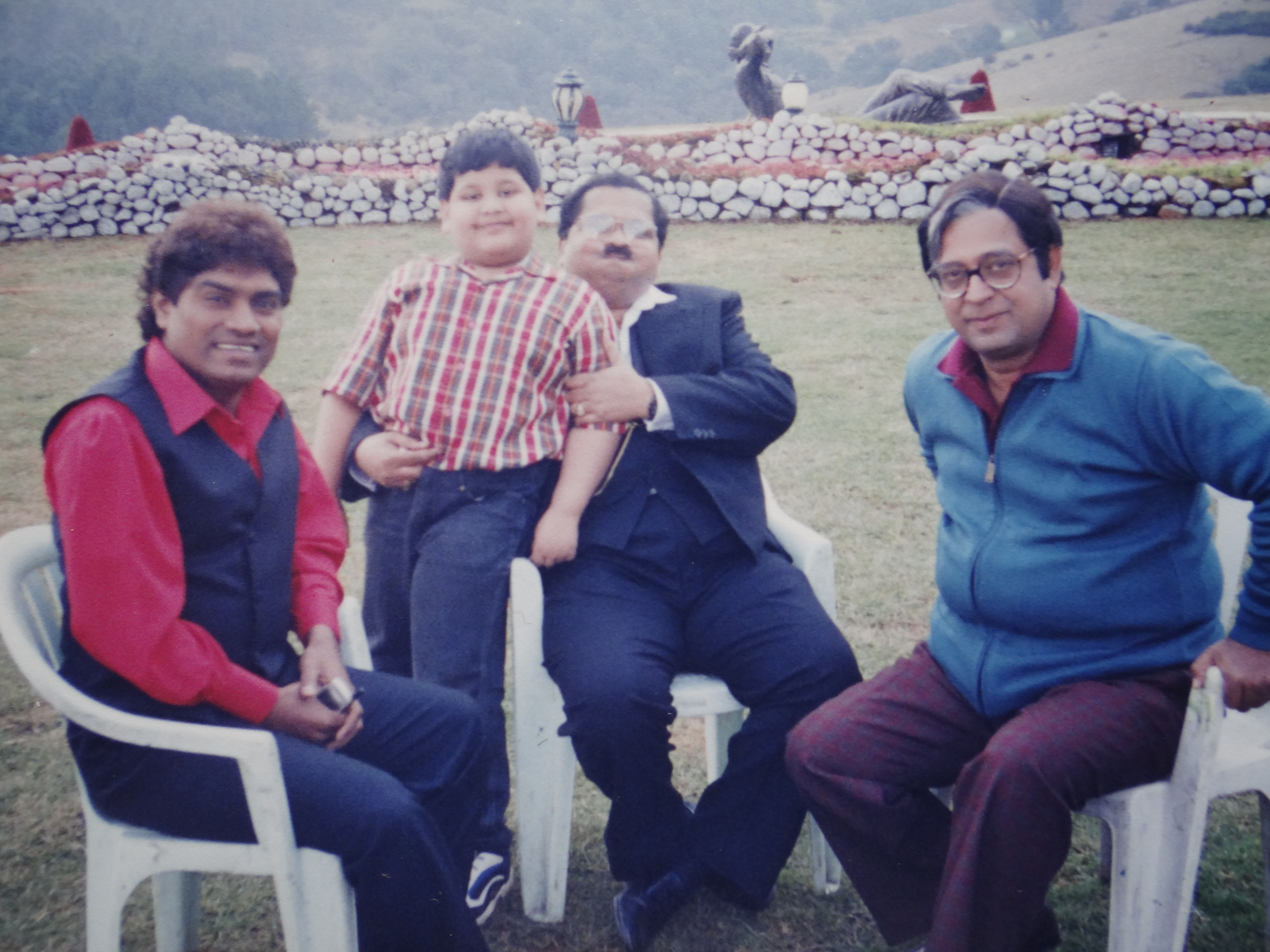
A Candid Shot of Kaivalya Chheda with Johnny Lever, Tiku Talsania and Pramod Moutho

He started his career freelancing as a stage actor in Punjab and Delhi, where he worked for a few years. Currently he is shooting for a web series where he is playing triple role one is Australian Cricketer Darren Lehmann, second is Liqour King Walia and third is KN Swamy an Indian Businessman settled in Middle East.

He acted in a number of TV plays, telefilms and TV Serials including Supne Te Parchhaven, Buniyad and Bebasi. After working with National School of Drama Repertory Company, New Delhi for some time, he shifted to Mumbai to try his luck in films. He has acted in a number of films including Khalnayak and Raja Hindustani.

== Filmography ==
- Daddy as Oscar
- Karishma Kali Kaa (1990) as Minister Sampoorna Anand
- College Girl (1990) as Madhuri's brother
- Yalgaar (1992) as Press Reporter
- Aaj Kie Aurat (1993) as Builder Shyam Kumar Gupta
- Khalnayak (1993) as Roshan Mahanta
- Dilwale (1994) as Mama Thakur's Brother
- 1942 A Love Story (1994) as Govind
- Veergati (1995) as Minister Brahmachari
- Mafia (1996) as Minister Praja Swami
- Loafer (1996) as Dhandpani
- Raja Hindustani (1996) as Swaraj (Shalu's brother)
- Agnichakra (film) (1997) as Jumbo
- Ankhon Mein Tum Ho (1997) as Mohan
- Qila (1998) as Prosecuting attorney
- Dushman (1998) as ACP Santosh Singh Sehgal
- Mehndi (1998) as Mr. Chaudhary
- Hero Hindustani as Rashid
- Military Raaj(1998) as politician Nagishvar Rao
- Mafia Raaj (1998)
- Dulhan Banoo Main Teri (1999) as Minister Sukhdev
- Heeralal Pannalal (1999) as S.K. Motiwala
- Phool Aur Aag (1999) as Killer
- Agniputra (2000)
- Deewane (2000) as Lekhraj's Brother
- Justice Chowdhary (2000) as Asgar Thakral
- Bichhoo (2000) as Pankaj Kharbanda
- Shikari (2000)
- Kurukshetra (2000) as ACP Patwardhan
- Belagaam (2002)
- 26 January Good Morning India (2009)
- Raju Chacha (2000) as Prabhakar Sinha
- Indian (2001) as Inspector Moutho
- Shaheed-E-Kargil (2000)
- Jodi No.1 as Rajpal
- Gadar: Ek Prem Katha (2001) as Gurdeep (Tara's father)
- Aks (2001) as Justice Balwant Chaudhry
- Be-Lagaam (2002) as Ajit Pal as Tanveer Zaidi's Uncle
- Hathyar (2002)
- Basti (2003) as Minister
- Dev (2004) as Ali Khan
- What's Your Raashee? (2009) as Indravadan Zaveri
- Jodhaa Akbar (2008) as Todar Mal
- Lahore (2010) as Shahnawaz Qureshi
- Dark Rainbow (2011) as Ruhi's father
- Chinar Daastaan-E-Ishq (2015) as Salaam
- Risknamaa (2019) as Phool Chand Kaka Directed By Aarun Nagar
- The E-Ghost as Father Saldanha

== Television ==
- Supne Te Parchhaven Punjabi (TV Serial)
- Bharat Ek Khoj
- Buniyad (Punjabi Serial)
- Bebasi (Punjabi Teleplay)
- Junior G (2001-2003) as Fyomancho
- Chanakya (TV series, 1991-1992) as Maha Mantri Shaktar
- Tehkikaat (episodes 16 and 17: A Mystery Behind missing Girl and episodes 51 and 52: Murder of Sam D'Silva as Doctor Shenoy)
- Maan Rahe Tera Pitaah (2010)
- Adaalat (2010–2016) as Advocate Avatramani
- Rab Se Sohna Isshq (2012-2013)

== Stage ==
- Hewers of Coal
- Kya Number Badlega
- Chhatrian
- Nayak Katha
- Balde Tibbe (Desire Under the Elms)
- Shuturmurg
- Surya Ki Antim Kiran Se Surya Ki Pehli Kiran Tak
