= Neeli Aankhen =

- Created by: Shiv Creations
- Directed by: Shyam Ramsay; Sasha Ramsay
- Starring: see below
- Opening theme: "Neeli Aankhen"
- Country of origin: India
- Original language: Hindi
- No. of episodes: 28

Production
- Running time: approx. 25 minutes

Original release
- Network: Sahara One
- Release: 9 February – 4 May 2008

Neeli Aankhen (transl. Blue Eyes) is an Indian television supernatural series based on the concept of wishful female serpent. The series premiered on 9 February 2008 on Sahara One.

== Plot ==
The story is of a shape-shifting naagin (female serpent) Vaishali, who resides underground, but comes to earth to lead a human life after being blessed with a magical boon (vardaan). She faces many negative forces, but tries to take revenge for whatever bad is being done to her. Eventually she falls in love with a rich man's son, Rahul, who happens to have an intense phobia for snakes.

Being the sole heir of his father, Rahul is set to inherit the entire property. Hence, his stepmother, Kanishka, along with her son, Vinod, and brother, Dhanraaj, plans to kill Rahul (to take over his entire property) by causing a car accident. However, Rahul gets saved by Vaishali, and falls in love with her, not being aware of her identity as a shape-shifting serpent. He wants to marry her, but the questions remains whether Vaishali ever tell him about her true identity, and whether she will be able to save him from his enemies.

== Cast ==
- Rubina Sasihuddin as Vaishali (an icchadhari naagin)
- Dilip Thadeshwar as Rahul Oberoi
- Deep Dhillon as Avinash Rana (Rajan's friend)
- Shahbaz Khan as Aka
- Sonia Kapoor as Neha Oberoi (Rahul's younger sister)
- Puneet Vashisht as Vinod Oberoi (Rahul's stepbrother and Kanishka's son)
- Faraaz Khan as Inspector Vivek Kapoor
- Surendra Pal as Rajan Oberoi (Rahul and Neha's father)
- Meena Ghai
- Tej Sapru as Dhanraj (Kanishka's brother)
- Ashwin Kaushal as Ronnie Rana
- Upasana Singh
- Supriya Karnik as Kanishka Rajan Oberoi (Rahul and Neha's stepmother and Vinod's mother)
