= Sambha =

Village in Maharashtra

- village
- Location in Maharashtra, India Sambha (India)
- Coordinates: 20.1952326°N 72.8426858°E
- Country: India
- State: Maharashtra
- District: Palghar
- Taluka: Talasari
- Elevation: 21 m (69 ft)

Population (2011)
  - Total: 4,881
- Time zone: UTC+5:30 (IST)
- 2011 census code: 551531

For the Sholay film character, see the article on Mac Mohan – the actor who played the role. For the city in Jammu and Kashmir, see Samba, Jammu.

Sambha is a village in the Palghar district of Maharashtra, India. It is located in the Talasari taluka.

== Demographics ==
According to the 2011 census of India, Sambha has 825 households. The effective literacy rate (i.e. the literacy rate of population excluding children aged 6 and below) is 66.63%.

Demographics (2011 Census)
	Total	Male	Female
Population	4881	2525	2356
Children aged below 6 years	715	376	339
Scheduled caste	3	1	2
Scheduled tribe	4292	2234	2058
Literates	2776	1644	1132
Workers (all)	1946	1208	738
Main workers (total)	1589	1014	575
Main workers: Cultivators	261	185	76
Main workers: Agricultural labourers	367	181	186
Main workers: Household industry workers	23	12	11
Main workers: Other	938	636	302
Marginal workers (total)	357	194	163
Marginal workers: Cultivators	55	26	29
Marginal workers: Agricultural labourers	74	35	39
Marginal workers: Household industry workers	18	8	10
Marginal workers: Others	210	125	85
Non-workers	2935	1317	1618
