= Raksha Gupta =

Indian actress

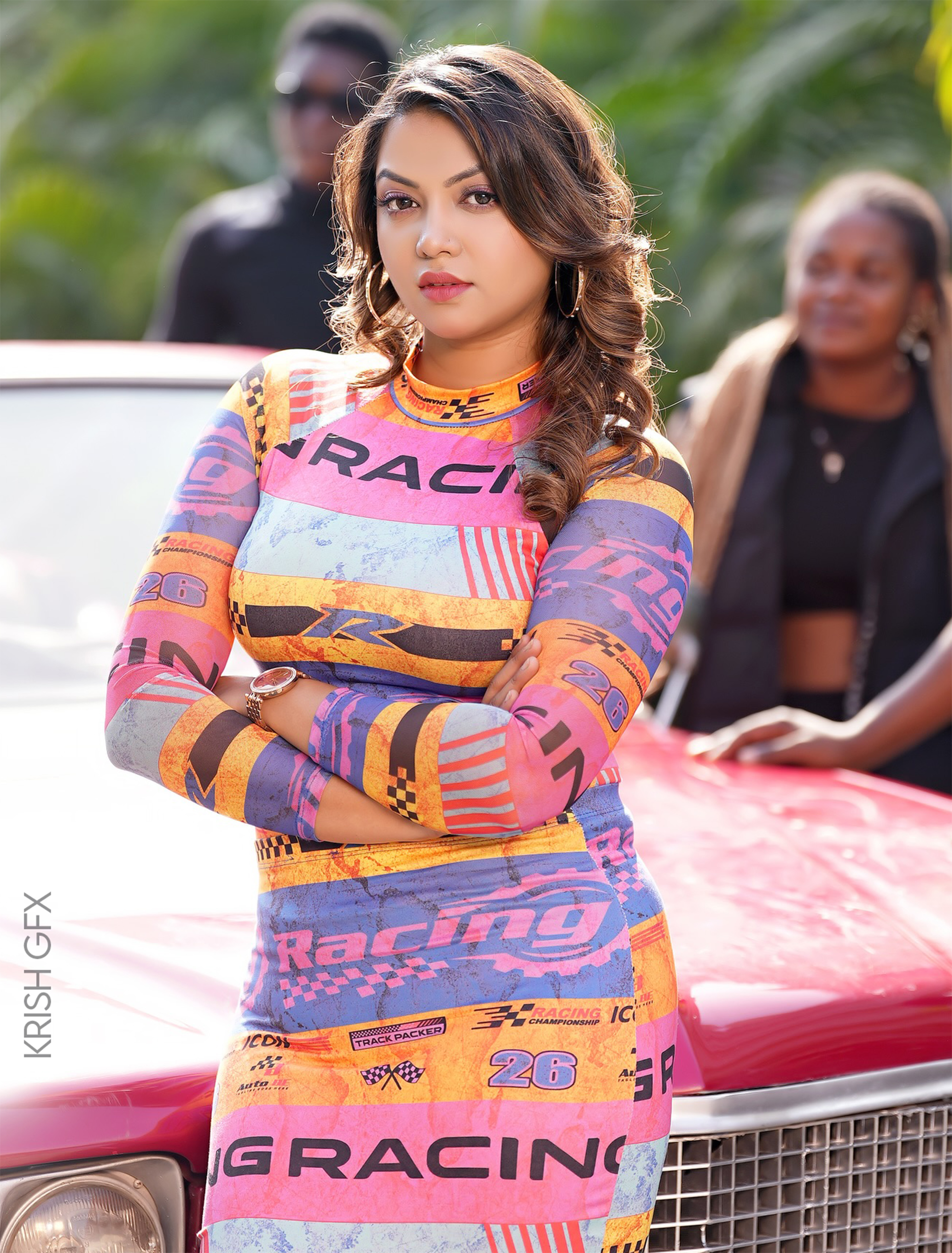
- Indian actress Raksha Gupta in 2025
- Born: 2 September 1998 (age 27); Motihari, East Champaran, Bihar, India
- Occupation: Actress
- Years active: 2020–present

Raksha Gupta (born 2 September 1998) is an Indian actress. She has worked in Bhojpuri films like Thik Hai, Commando Arjun, Rowdy Inspector, Doli Saja Ke Rakhna and Shankhnaad.

== Early life and education ==
Gupta was born on 2 September 1998 in Motihari, East Champaran, Bihar. Her father was an auto driver.

Gupta completed her schooling from Government school in Dwarka, Delhi. She has 3 siblings.

== Career ==
Gupta participated in the TV reality show Nach Baliye Season 6 in 2014 and she was the second runner up. She returned from Mumbai and did his graduation from Delhi University. Raksha then joined the Yatharth Art & Cultural Society in Delhi. Raksha made her debut in Bhojpuri cinema with film Thik Hai opposite Dinesh Lal Yadav. Raksha Gupta has acted in several Bhojpuri films like Commando Arjun, Naseehat, Gharwali Baharwali 2, Vadh and Kurukshetra. She has also worked in Bhojpuri web series Pakadua Biyah, and Hindi films Vish and The Dark Jungle. In 2023, Raksha acted in Bhojpuri films Chachi No.1 opposite Yash Kumarr, and Bewafa opposite Ritesh Pandey.

== Filmography ==
- Dostana
- Commando Arjun
- Shankhnaad
- Naseehat
- Rowdy Inspector (2022)
- Doli Saja Ke Rakhna (2022)
- Gharwali Baharwali 2
- Kurukshetra
- Son of Bihar
- Daag Ego Lanchan
- Chachi No.1
- Bewafa
- Krantikari 1924
- Mitti
- Jugal Master (2025)

== Web series ==
- Pakadua Biyah

== See also ==
- List of Bhojpuri actresses
