= Achanak 37 Saal Baad =

Horror Tv Show

- Genre: Psychological thriller; Supernatural; Mystery
- Written by: Shridhar Raghavan
- Directed by: Mukul Abhyankar
- Country of origin: India
- Original language: Hindi
- No. of episodes: 197

Production
- Producers: B. P. Singh; Pradeep Uppoor
- Production company: Fireworks Production

Original release
- Release: 22 March 2002 – 2 February 2003

Achanak - 37 Saal Baad (transl. Suddenly - after 37 years) is an Indian supernatural and psychological thriller television serial which was telecasted on Sony TV. The centerpiece of this serial was the little known small town of Gahota, which experienced paranormal activities after each cycle of 37 years. It aired on 22 March 2002 to 2 February 2003.

== Plot ==
Strange things happen in Gahota every 37 years causing a strange hysteria in people and leading them to kill others or themselves and not remembering anything once the cycle is over in a few months. Gahota is controlled by the devil's henchman, Ajay, who has been granted the ability to control the minds of people in Gahota by the devil himself.

Preparing for the devil's birth, Ajay removes anyone who comes in the way by murdering the person. Eventually, the devil is born in the form of Rahul/Ajinkya. Ajay encourages the young Rahul to recall his powers and true purpose since Rahul has grown up as a normal, kind human being oblivious of his powers. Rahul finally transforms into Ajinkya, who promptly kills Ajay as he is no longer needed. Later, Ajay comes back to life and joins the reincarnated others to defeat and kill Ajinkya once and for all.

== Cast ==
- Faraaz Khan as Ajay / Professor Jaidev
- Rahil Azam as Rahul / Ajinkya
- Iravati Harshe as Sheela
- Sanjeev Vatsa as Sanjeev
- Siraj Mustafa Khan as Deepen (Dipankar's reincarnation)
- Yajuvendra Singh as Sattu / Satyapal
- Shishir Sharma as Pratap, Sheela's father
- Rajendranath Zutshi as Dipankar Ray
- Kamlesh Sawant as Inspector Vanshi
- Kanchan Mirchandani as Neena (Sheela's reincarnation)
- Neelu Kohli as Neena's mother
- Sunila Karambelkar as Janhvi
- Ravindra Mankani as Avinash
- Ashwini Kalsekar as Malini
- Shivani Gosain as Dr. Shobhna (Malini's psychiatrist)
- Aashka Goradia as Kamal (Neena's younger sister)
- Zafar Karachiwala as Ratan (Sheela's childhood friend)
- Tina Parekh as Sarika (Ratan's sister)
- Indu Verma as Dr. Bhumika
- Manish Nagpal as Arjun (Ratan's reincarnation)
- Bijay Anand as Detective Jugal
- Sunita Rajwar as Sunita (Ajinkya's evil babysitter)
- Ravi Jhankal as Gurudev Shantanu
- Shruti Ulfat as Rupali
- Tannaz Irani as Naina
- Neha Mehta as Anjali
- Rituraj Singh as Shashank
- Akshay Anand / Iqlaq Khan as Rahul’s father
- Nishigandha Wad as Rahul’s mother
- Shital Shah as Princess Of Garawali
- Kamya Panjabi as Reshmi
- Rushali Arora as Sunidhi
- Raj Arjun as Glass Factory Manager
- Surekha Sikri as Shashank’s grandmother
- Manoj Joshi as Arjun’s father
- Narendra Jha as ACP Amardeep Kawale
- Manav Kaul as Devender
- Hrishikesh Pandey as Nikhil
- Simple Kaul as Kavita
- Mayuri Kango as Mehek
- Gufi Paintal as Pandit Dharmjeet
- Sagarika Soni as Shalini (Malini's reincarnation)

== Episode list ==
Achanak 37 Saal Baad Episodes
No.	Title	Original release date
1	"Gahota Ki Khabar"	6 May 2002
2	"Nakli Tasveerein"	7 May 2002
3	"Gahota Ka Raaz"	8 May 2002
4	"Sheela Reaches Gahota"	9 May 2002
5	"Dipankar Arrives In Gahota"	10 May 2002
6	"Dipankar Ki Theory"	13 May 2002
7	"Malini Ki Drishti"	14 May 2002
8	"Koi Kaise Bhool Sakta Hai?"	15 May 2002
9	"Samay Ki Keemat"	16 May 2002
10	"The Ghosts Of Gahota"	17 May 2002
11	"Shikaar Aur Shikaari"	20 May 2002
12	"Attack On Malini"	21 May 2002
13	"Makadi Ka Jaal"	22 May 2002
14	"Gahota Ka Maalik"	23 May 2002
15	"Dipankar's Sacrifice"	24 May 2002
16	"Intezaar Khatam Hua"	27 May 2002
17	"House in Secrets"	28 May 2002
18	"Bloody Mary"	29 May 2002
19	"Safed Khargosh"	30 May 2002
20	"Bass Kuch Hi Dino Ki Baat Hai"	31 May 2002
21	"Koi Ghar Mein Hai"	3 June 2002
22	"Sheela Kahin Nahi Jayegi"	4 June 2002
23	"Sarika Ka Accident Ho Gaya"	5 June 2002
24	"Ajeeb Khel Hai"	6 June 2002
25	"The Candles Display Messages"	7 June 2002
26	"Abb Se Savdhaan Rehna Hai"	10 June 2002
27	"Ye Baccha Nahi Kuch Aur Hai"	11 June 2002
28	"Where Is Sheela?"	12 June 2002
29	"Bacchon Ki Badli"	13 June 2002
30	"Koi Ghar Mein Hai"	14 June 2002
31	"Welcome Home"	17 June 2002
32	"Bachne Ki Chaah"	18 June 2002
33	"Twenty-One Years Later"	19 June 2002
34	"Main Pagal Nahi Hoon"	20 June 2002
35	"Professor Jaidev Here"	21 June 2002
36	"Sapno Ke Meaning"	24 June 2002
37	"Talking To Spirits"	25 June 2002
38	"Ek Jaise Sapne?"	26 June 2002
39	"Recurring Dreams"	27 June 2002
40	"Mysterious Woman"	28 June 2002
41	"Reincarnation?"	1 July 2002
42	"Naina Ko Marna Padega"	2 July 2002
43	"Khaali Kamraa"	3 July 2002
44	"Gaadi Ka Kissa"	4 July 2002
45	"Sanjeev Escapes The Asylum"	5 July 2002
46	"Missing Book"	8 July 2002
47	"Dreams Theory"	9 July 2002
48	"Amit Is Critical"	10 July 2002
49	"Sanjeev Looks For Ajay"	11 July 2002
50	"Haadsa Ya Khoon?"	12 July 2002
51	"Professor Jaidev Persuades Rahul"	15 July 2002
52	"Bhoomika Meets Professor Jaidev"	16 July 2002
53	"Attempt On Sanjeev's Life"	17 July 2002
54	"Rahul Ki Chinta"	18 July 2002
55	"Sanjeev Arrives At The Camp"	19 July 2002
56	"Jaidev Makes His Move"	22 July 2002
57	"Sanjeev Confronts The Soul"	23 July 2002
58	"Manish Goes Missing"	24 July 2002
59	"Buri Aatma Ki Nishani"	25 July 2002
60	"Professor Jaidev Persuades Rahul"	26 July 2002
61	"Professor Jaidev Ka Sach"	29 July 2002
62	"Raat Ka Intezaar"	30 July 2002
63	"The Needle Of Doubt"	31 July 2002
64	"Ajinkya Ki Asli Shakti"	1 August 2002
65	"Rahul's Transformation"	2 August 2002
66	"Dost Ya Dushman?"	5 August 2002
67	"Buri Shakti Ka Ilaaj"	6 August 2002
68	"Tumhe Kis Baat Se Khushi Hogi?"	7 August 2002
69	"Koi Nahi Samjhega"	8 August 2002
70	"Rahul Finds Bhoomika"	9 August 2002
71	"Bhoomika Marr Chuki Hai?"	12 August 2002
72	"Neena Warns Kamal"	13 August 2002
73	"Har Cheez Mein Aage"	14 August 2002
74	"Rahul's Offer For Neena"	15 August 2002
75	"Dost Ya Dushman?"	16 August 2002
76	"Rahul's Mother Meets Gurudev"	19 August 2002
77	"Kya Farak Hai Hum Dono Mein"	20 August 2002
78	"Heera"	21 August 2002
79	"Rahul Ki Investment"	22 August 2002
80	"A Test For Kamal"	23 August 2002
81	"Ajinkiya"	26 August 2002
82	"Bangla Bula Raha Hai"	27 August 2002
83	"Ajay Returns"	28 August 2002
84	"Ek Teer Do Nishane"	29 August 2002
85	"Diamond Merchant"	30 August 2002
86	"Police Ko Dhokha"	2 September 2002
87	"Ajinkya Ki Kahaani"	3 September 2002
88	"Shaitani Shaktiya"	4 September 2002
89	"Ajay Ki Asliyat"	5 September 2002
90	"Ajay Abb Badal Chuka Hai"	6 September 2002
91	"Daraavni Gufa"	9 September 2002
92	"Second Thoughts"	10 September 2002
93	"Asli Guruji Kaun?"	11 September 2002
94	"Mandir Aur Gufa"	12 September 2002
95	"Finding The Cave"	13 September 2002
96	"Mitti Ka Putla"	16 September 2002
97	"Nayi Aatma Ka Nirmaan"	17 September 2002
98	"Ajinkya Ke Dushman"	18 September 2002
99	"Ajay Enters The Cave"	19 September 2002
100	"Dhoka"	20 September 2002
101	"Maut Ka Raaz"	23 September 2002
102	"Aarti"	24 September 2002
103	"Maksad"	25 September 2002
104	"I Have Changed"	26 September 2002
105	"Khooni Ko Dhoondo"	27 September 2002
106	"Jaadui Baksa"	30 September 2002
107	"Nameless Face"	1 October 2002
108	"Pehchaan Kaun"	2 October 2002
109	"Voh Jeetega"	3 October 2002
110	"Kaisa Laga Rahul?"	4 October 2002
111	"Shraap Se Mukti"	7 October 2002
112	"Dost Aur Dushman Mein Farak"	8 October 2002
113	"Maut Ka Khel"	9 October 2002
114	"Garawali"	10 October 2002
115	"Jaadu Nagri"	11 October 2002
116	"Ajinkya's Hostages"	14 October 2002
117	"Jaadugar Ki Sharat"	15 October 2002
118	"Gupt Raasta"	16 October 2002
119	"Kayamat Ki Raat"	17 October 2002
120	"Chhati Indri"	18 October 2002
121	"Moti Ki Shaktiyon Ka Raaz"	21 October 2002
122	"Rajkumari's Efforts To Take Control"	22 October 2002
123	"Ajinkya Gets The Ring"	23 October 2002
124	"Ajinkya Gets Caught"	24 October 2002
125	"Ajinkya Interrogated By The Army"	25 October 2002
126	"Ajinkya Escapes The Army"	28 October 2002
127	"A Trip To The Past"	29 October 2002
128	"Ajinkya's Next Target"	30 October 2002
129	"Ajinkya Gets Powerful"	31 October 2002
130	"Dipen's Life At Risk"	1 November 2002
131	"Rajkumari Fights For Her Life"	4 November 2002
132	"Dagger Or The Ring?"	5 November 2002
133	"Sattu Disappears"	6 November 2002
134	"The New Sattu"	7 November 2002
135	"Khoon Ya Katal?"	8 November 2002
136	"Ajinkya Ki Shaktiyan"	11 November 2002
137	"The Destroyed Ring"	12 November 2002
138	"Mysterious Location"	13 November 2002
139	"Ajay's Sacrifice"	14 November 2002
140	"Atmaao Ki Mukti"	15 November 2002
141	"Kaha Hai Dadi Maa?"	18 November 2002
142	"Baatcheet Ka Zariya"	19 November 2002
143	"Moti Ko Dhundo"	20 November 2002
144	"Mujhe Nahi Jaante?"	21 November 2002
145	"Ye Tera Darr Hain"	22 November 2002
146	"Ajinkya's Dreams"	25 November 2002
147	"Ajju Ki Baddua"	26 November 2002
148	"Looking For Ajinkya"	27 November 2002
149	"Janvi Ki Shaktiyan"	28 November 2002
150	"Asli Aur Nakli Ka Fark"	29 November 2002
151	"Janvi Gets Into The Power Grid"	2 December 2002
152	"Bijli Ki Dikkat"	3 December 2002
153	"Janvi Breaks Ajinkya Out"	4 December 2002
154	"Ajay And Gurudev Locked Up"	5 December 2002
155	"Gurudev Faces Janvi"	6 December 2002
156	"Gurudev Gets Captured"	9 December 2002
157	"Ashram Mein Toofaan"	10 December 2002
158	"Janvi Wants The Ring"	11 December 2002
159	"Unhone Janvi Ko Maar Diya"	12 December 2002
160	"Yeh Sirf Tumhara Vehem Hai"	13 December 2002
161	"Gurudev Wants To Find Ajay And Kamal"	16 December 2002
162	"Janvi Meets Ajinkya"	17 December 2002
163	"Ye Nahi Toh Tum Bhi Nahi"	18 December 2002
164	"Shaam Hone Se Pehle Pahuchna Hai"	19 December 2002
165	"Janvi Tumhe Bula Rahi Hai"	20 December 2002
166	"Kata Hua Haath"	23 December 2002
167	"Sheesha"	24 December 2002
168	"The Antique Store"	25 December 2002
169	"Sheesha Kahan Hai?"	26 December 2002
170	"Yahan Sab Ulta Hai"	27 December 2002
171	"Jaal Bichhana Padega"	30 December 2002
172	"Savdhaan Rehna"	31 December 2002
173	"Ajay Se Kaun Ladega?"	1 January 2003
174	"Janvi's Death"	2 January 2003
175	"Ajinkya Ki Barbadi"	3 January 2003
176	"Maut Ka Intezaar"	6 January 2003
177	"Kya Ajinkya Wapis Aayega?"	7 January 2003
178	"Kahan Hoga Ajinkya?"	8 January 2003
179	"The Hunt Has Begun"	9 January 2003
180	"Kal Subah Tak Der Ho Gayi Toh?"	10 January 2003
181	"Mysterious Deaths"	13 January 2003
182	"The Undead"	14 January 2003
183	"Unexplained Hallucinations"	15 January 2003
184	"New Light Hospital"	16 January 2003
185	"Pehchana?"	17 January 2003
186	"Ajinkya Yahin Hain"	20 January 2003
187	"Sweet Desire"	21 January 2003
188	"Ajay Par Bharosa Mat Karna"	22 January 2003
189	"Devendra's Interrogation"	23 January 2003
190	"Smashed"	24 January 2003
191	"The Haunted Shoot"	27 January 2003
192	"Jaadooi Sheesha"	28 January 2003
193	"Amardeep's Fate"	29 January 2003
194	"Shaitani Taakat"	30 January 2003
195	"Search for Tanya"	
196	"House of Horrors"	1 February 2003
197	"Ajinkya se Ladne ki Shakti"	2 February 2003

== Awards ==
Indian Telly award for Best horror programme of the year in 2003.
