= List of Bhojpuri films =

This is a list of films produced by the Bhojpuri film industry from the earliest films of the 1960s to the present. Films are listed by year of release, then alphabetically within each year. Also listed are the highest-grossing films and the record maker films.

== Highest-grossing films ==
Below are the highest-grossing Bhojpuri films of all time:

Rank	Film	Production company	Worldwide gross	Note
1	Sasura Bada Paisawala (2003)	Balaji Cinevision	₹35 crore (US$3.7 million)	
2	Pratigya (2008)	Venus Films	₹35 crore (US$3.7 million)	
3	Ganga (2006)	N/A	₹21 crore (US$2.2 million)	
4	Border (2018)	Nirahua Entertainment	₹19 crore (US$2.0 million)	80 Lakh Original budget
5	Nirahua Rickshawala (2008)	Nirahua Entertainment pvt. Ltd. & Rahul khan production presents	₹100cr (US$10.4 million)	Original budget: ₹57 lakh, Original box office: ₹100crore

== Critically acclaimed films ==
Film	Recognition	Description
Kab Hoi Gawna Hamar (2005)	First national film award winning film	Family drama harking back to traditional values and modern-day sensibilities.
Udedh Bun (2008)	Udedh Bun won the Silver Bear for Best Short Film at the 2008 Berlin International Film Festival, first ever such award in the history of Bhojpuri cinema. Later it won the National Film Award for Best Short fiction Film.	Creatively portraying a young boy's dilemma as he comes face to face with the temptations of life. The film evocatively explores the erotic under‐currents in this coming of age tale.
Deswa (2011)	Deswa is the first Bhojpuri film in 50 years to get selected at Indian Panorama section of International Film Festival of India	The film deals with contemporary issues affecting youths.
HE... (2011)	This film was screened at International Film Festival of India in 2010 followed by Pune International Film Festival in 2011.	Hari, A 13-years old ragpicker, runs away from Bihar to Mumbai. He bags a role in a Short film that makes him popular as "Hero".
Breathe (2018)	Best regional short film award at Jharkhand International Film Festival in 2018.	A short film about a student and academic pressure.
Bhent (2018)	Won the best scriptwriter Award at Jharkhand International film festival in 2018	Bhent is a story of a meeting of an artist Gyanedra and his ex writer girlfriend Roli after separation of four years for 24 hours.
In Search of Bidesia (2019)	The film was lauded as the most outstanding film about music/sound in the world" at the RAI Film Festival in the UK in 2021. Also screened at Bangalore Literature Festival and 18th Dhaka International Film Festival.	It is a 2019 musical documentary film directed by Mumbai-based filmmaker Simit Bhagat.
Kariyathi (2025)	Screening at Chennai International Film Festival, 2025	Based on discrimination based on skin color in the indian society.
Chhath (2025)	Selected to be premiered at Indian Panorama section of International Film Festival of India in 2025 and Indian Film Festival of Melbourne in 2026.	The film portrays Bhojpuri culture specially the Chhath festival.

== 1960s ==
Title	Director	Cast	Notes
1962
Ganga Maiyya Tohe Piyari Chadhaibo	Kundan Kumar	Ashim Kumar, Kumkum	
1963
Bidesiya	S. N. Tripathi	Sujit Kumar, Naaz	
Laagi Naahi Chhute Rama	Kundan Kumar	Ashim Kumar, Kumkum	
1964
Balma Bada Nadaan	Baldev Jhingan	Ashim Kumar, Kumkum	
Jekra Charanwa Mein Lagle Paranwa	Adarsh	Jagdeep, Jaimala	
Jogin			
Kab Hoihain Gawanwa Hamaar	P.L. Santoshi		
Naag Panchami	Shantilal Soni	Sheel Kumar, Preetibala	
Naihar Chhutal Jaye	Devendra Goel	Deven Varma, Kumkum	
Sita Maiya	S. N. Tripathi		
1965
Ayeel Basant Bahar	Devendra Goel	Sujit Kumar, Naaz	
Bhouji	Kundan Kumar	Sujit Kumar, Kumkum	
Ganga	Kundan Kumar	Sujit Kumar, Kumkum	
Hamaar Sansar	Kundan Kumar	Ashim Kumar, Lily Chakravarty	
Saiyan Se Bhaile Milanwa	P. L. Santoshi	Sujit Kumar, Saeeda Khan	
Saiyan Se Neha Lagaibe	S. M. Abbas	Sujit Kumar, Naaz	
Solaho Singhaar Kare Dulhiniya	Romni De	Motilal, Anita Guha	
1966
Loha Singh	Kundan Kumar	Sujit Kumar, Vijaya Chowdhury	
Mitwa	Govind Moonis	Amita, Shekhar	
1968
Vidhana Naach Nachawe	K. Prasad Shukla	Sujit Kumar, Mumtaz	

== 1970s ==
Title	Director	Cast	Notes
1971
Dher Chalaki Jinkara	Dutta Keshav	Raja Gosavi	
1977
Dangal	Rati Kumnar	Sujit Kumar, Prema Narayan	
1979
Balam Pardesia	Nazir Hussain	Rakesh Pandey, Padma Khanna	
Mai Ka Lal	Rajpati	Sujit Kumar, Prema Narayan	

== 1980s ==
Title	Director	Cast	Notes
1980
Baaje Shehnaai Hamaar Anganaa	Javed Rehman	Bharat Bhushan, Naaz	
Jaagal Bhag Hamaar	S. N. Tripathi	Sujit Kumar, Prema Narayan	
Roos Gailen Saiyen Hamaar	Nazir Hussain	Rakesh Pandey, Padma Khanna	
1981
Chanwa Ke Take Chakor	Nazir Hussain	Rakesh Pandey, Hina Kausar	
Dharti Maiya	Qamar Narvi	Kunal Singh. Padma Khanna	
Ganga Aur Sarju	Akthar Balman	Rakesh Pandey, Madhu Malini	
Ganga Ghat	Rajpati	Sujit Kumar, Prema Narayan	
Saiyan Tore Karan	Radhakant	Rakesh Pandey, Padma Khanna	
1982
Balma Nadaan	Akbar Balam	Rakesh Pandey, Madhu Malini	
Bitiya Bhayeel Sayaan	Radhakant	Sujit Kumar, Rakesh Pandey, Jayshree T.	
Ganga Maiya Bhar De Achar wa Hamaar	Dilip Bose	Narayan Bhandari, Madhu Mishra	
1983
Chukti Bhar Senur	Nasir Hussain	Kunal Singh, Hina Kausar	
Hamar Bhauji	Kalpataru	Tanuja, Sachin Pilgaonkar	
Ganga Kinare Mora Gaon	Dilip Bose	Kunal Singh, Naaz	
Jai Bhawani	B. J. Patel	Rakesh Pandey, Padma Khanna	
Jahan Bahe Ganga Dhar	Shyam Kaushal	Dharmesh Tiwari, Hina Kausar	
Phulwari	Mukul Dutt	Shashi Puri, Devashree Roy	
Piya Nirmohiya	Prem Singh	Jai Tilak, Madhu Malini	
Sajai Da Maang Hamaar	Rati Kumar	Sujit Kumar, Padma Khanna	
Sampoorna Tirtha Yatra	Rajpati	Sujit Kumar, Rakesh Pandey, Madhu Malini	
Senur	Amar Gupta	Rakesh Pandey, Padma Khanna	
Sonva Ke Pinjra	Lalji Yadav	Rakesh Pandey, Prema Narayan	
1984
Bansuriya Baaje Ganga Teer	Rakesh Pandey	Abhi Bhattacharya, Padma Khanna, Prema Narayan	
Bairi Saawan	Prem Singh	Sujit Kumar, Rajni Sharma	
Bhaiya Dooj	Qamar Narvi	Sujit Kumar, Rakesh Pandey, Padma Khanna	
Gajab Bhaile Rama	K.P. Shukla		
Kishen Kanhaiya	Hridayesh Pandey		
Maibha Mahtari	Man Singh	Man Singh, Urmila Singh	
Paan Khaye Saiyan Hamaar	Sujit Kumar	Sujit Kumar, Bandini Mishra, Amitabh Bachchan, Rekha	
Saiyan Magan Pahelwani Mein	Radhakant	Sujit Kumar, Rakesh Pandey, Padma Khanna	
Thakurayeen	Bhagwant Thakur, Minnie Thakur	Sujit Kumar, Padma Khanna	First film to be co-directed by a female director
1985
Bihari Babu	Dilip Bose	Shatrughan Sinha, Kunal Singh, Alpana Goswami	
Ganga Maiya Tohar Kiriya	Naresh Kumar	Sujit Kumar, Padma Khanna	
Naihar Ki Chunri	Hasmukh Rajput	Lalitesh, Meera Madhuri	
Piya Ke Gaon	Dilip Bose	Danish, Meera Madhuri	
Pritam More Ganga Teere	Rajkumar Pardesi	Durga Prasad, Jayshree T.	
1986
Aangan Ke Lakshmi	Tejesh Akhauri	Lalitesh, Meera Madhuri	
Babua Hamaar	K.K. Verma	Abhishek, Neelima	
Bahina Tohre Khatir	Hasmukh Rajput	Dinesh Kaushik, Meera Madhuri	
Bitiya Chalal Sasural	Dilip Bhatt	Kiran Kumar, Sheila David	
Dulha Ganga Paar Ke	Rajkumar Sharma	Kunal Singh, Gouri Khurana	
Dulhin	Ashok Chand Jain	Kanan Kaushal, J. Mohan	
Ganga Hamaar Mai	Dilip Bose	Sujit Kumar,Rakesh Pandey, Bina Rai	
Ganga Jaisan Bhauji Hamaar	Dilip Bose	Sujit Kumar, Rakesh Pandey, Kanan Kaushal	
Ganga Ke Teere Teere	Rajpati	Ram Singh, Madhu Malini	
Ganga Ki Beti	K.D. Singh	Surendra Pal, Tina Ghai, Sonia Sahni	
Ghar Grihasti	Dilip Bose	Sujit Kumar, Rakesh Pandey, Bandini Mishra	
Garakh Nath Baba Tohe Khichari Charaibo	Surendra		
Paijaniya	Aslam Sheikh	Sujit Kumar, Hina Kausar	
Parbatia Banal Panditayan	Ramnath Rai	Shiv Agrahari, Girija Mitra	
Ram Jaisan Bhaiya Hamaar	Adarsh Jain	Kunal Singh, Meera Madhuri	
Senurwa Bhayeel Mohal	Gyan Kumar	Kunal Singh, Kalpana Iyer	
Sohag Bindiya	Paramjit Singh Sangha	Kunal Singh, Rajni Sharma	
Tulsi Sohe Hamaar Angna	Rakesh Pandey	Sujit Kumar, Rakesh Pandey, Padma Khanna	
1987
Bahuriya	Tejesh Akhauri	Rakesh Pandey, Padma Khanna	
Champa Chameli	B. Thakur	Sujit Kumar, Padma Khanna	
Dharti Ki Aawaz	K.D. Singh	Sujit Kumar, Kunal Singh Padma Khanna	
Ganga Jwala	Ashwini Kumar	Kunal Singh, Rekha Sahay	
Ganga Tulsi	Ram Singh	Ram Singh, Anu Dhawan	
Ganga Aabad Rakhiha Sajanwa Ke	Rajeev Ranjan		
Godana	Vinay Shukla	Kunal Singh, Meera Madhuri	
Hamri Dulhaniya	Shri Gopal	Jai Tilak, Shraddha Verma	
Pia Ke Pyaari	Prem Singh	Abhishek, Yasmin Khan	
Piritiya Ke Khel	Jagdish Sinha	Vijay Nair, Ritu Priya	
Piya Rakhiah Senurwa Ke Laaj	K. Vinod	Kunal Singh, Meera Madhuri	
Saiyan Bina Ghar Soona	Lalji Yadav	Ram Singh, Jai Prabha	
Sajanwa Bairi Bhaile Hamaar	Dilip Bose	Sujit Kumar, Deepika	
1988
Birha Ke Raat	Lalji Yadav	Ram Singh	
Dagabaaz Balma	Arati Bhattacharya	Kunal Singh, Sahila Chadha	First film to be independently directed by a female director
Ganga Aur Gouri	Jagdish Singh	Jai Tilak, Meera Madhuri	
Ganga Maiya Kara Da Milanwa Hamaar	Prem Singh	Abhishek, Meera Madhuri	
Lagal Chunri Mein Daag	B.L. Kashyap	Kunal Singh, Lalitesh	
Pyari Dulhiniya	Pandit Ramnath Shukla	Arun Govil, Meera Madhuri	
Tikuli Ke Laaj	Gyan Kumar		
1989
Anchara Ke Laaj	Vijay Trivedi	Surendra Rai, Seema Vaz, Sunayana	
Chhutki Bahu	Dilip Bose	Kunal Singh, Gauri Khurana	
Hamaar Dulha	Chhotu Purniyawala	Kunal Singh, Aanchal	
Kaisan Banaul Sansar	Dr. Gurudeep	Sujit Kumar, Shraddha Verma	
Kajri	K.K. Verma	Abhishek, Padma Khanna	
Mai	Rajkumar Sharma	Pankaj Sharma, Padma Khanna	
Patoh Bitiya	Aslam Sheikh	Sujit Kumar, Bandini Mishra	

== 1990s ==
Title	Director	Cast	Notes
1990
Beti Udhar Ke	Chandrabhushan Mani	Kunal Singh, Sona	
Bhag Ki Lekha	Naveen Joshi	Sujit Kumar, Yasmin Khan	
Hamaar Betwa	Kishore Kumar Singh	Sujit Kumar, Kunal Singh, Jamuna	
Kasam Ganga Jal Ke	Dilip Bose	Kunal Singh, Geeta	
Piya Toote Na Piritia Hamaar	K.D. Singh	Sujit Kumar, Padma Khanna	
Pyara Bhaiya	Dibaker Bose	Sujit Kumar, Bandini Mishra, Seema Vaz	
Piya Toote Na Piritiya Ke Dor	Akbar Balam	Rakesh Pandey, Anjana Mumtaz, Bandini Mishra	
1991
Bhaiya Bhauji Ke Dular	A.B. Tiwari	Rakesh Pandey, Nandita Thakur	
Dhania Munia	A.A. Darpan	Rakesh Pandey, Bandini Mishra	
Dulha	Adarsh Jain	Atlee Brar, Jamuna	
Ganga Maiya Bhar Da Godiya Hamaar	Jagdish Singh	Virendra Singh, Sonia Sahni	
Ganga Se Nata Ba Hamaar	Dilip Bose	Pankaj Sharma, Rita Bhaduri	
Ganga Kahe Pukaar Ke	Sri Gopal	Sujit Kumar, Padma Khanna	
Jug Jug Jiya More Laal	S.K. Srivastava	Vijay Khare, Dev Malhotra	
Piya Bina Nahi Chain	K Vinod	Kunal Singh, Seema Vaz	
Saanchi Piritiya Hamaar	Pramod Kumar Singh	Dinesh Kaushik, Anuradha Sawant	
1992
Baba Ke Dulari	Jaipal	Dilip Sinha, Gauri Khurana	
Bairi Kangna	Nihal Singh	Kunal Singh, Meera Madhuri	
Birhin Janam Janam Ke	Radhakant	Rakesh Pandey, Padma Khanna	
Chhute Na Sangatiya	Lalji Yadav	Satish Kaul, Jaya Prabha	
Gawna	Tejesh Akhauri	Manoj Verma, Meera Madhuri	
Kah Aihein Dulha Hamaar	Naval Joshi	Kunal Singh, Aanchal	
1993
Char Angna	Arati Bhattacharya	Kunal Singh, Vidyashree	
Palna Mein Jhoole Lalna Hamaar	Deva Rao	Rakesh Pandey, Padma Khanna	
1994
Chala Sakhi Dulha Dekhe	Raju Singh	Kunal Singh, Lalitesh	
Hamaar Sajna	Aslam Sheikh	Surendra Rai, Rachna Gill	
Langari Anhari	Jay Shankar Pandey	Rakesh Pandey, Bandini Mishra	
Rakhiha Laaj Ancharva Ke	Kumar Vikal	Rakesh Pandey, Sanjeevani, Nisha	
1995
Dulha Dulhin	Naveen Joshi	Kunal Singh, Seema Vaz	
Ghar Mandir	Deepu Verma	Rakesh Pandey, Padma Khanna	
Ho Jaye Da Naina Chaar	Rajkumar Sharma	Pankaj Sharma, Indrani Banerjee	
Ma Qasam			
Nehiya Lagawli Vipati Badhawli	Trilok Nath Bhatia	Sujit Kumar, Bandini Mishra	
Naag Devta	Ram Narayan	Lalitesh, Rooplata	
1996
Haq Ke Ladai	Kiran Kant	Rakesh Pandey, Padma Khanna	
Jhumkee	Rana Jaiswal	Kunal Singh, Padma Khanna	
Palkan Ke Mehman	Rajpati	Yunus Parvez, Suraj Chaddha, Meena	
Piritiya Ke Dushman	S. Mishra	Kader Khan, Shakti Kapoor, Raza Murad	
Saat Phere	Nihal Singh	Kunal Singh, Rakesh Pandey, Shoma Anand	
Saath Hamaar Tohar	Ashok Chaturvedi	Kunal Singh, Rakesh Pandey, Sahiba	
1997
Bhaile Piya Guleri Ke Phool	Prem Singh		
Hum Na Jaibo Sasur Ghar	Kalpataru	Sachin Pilgaonkar, Raj Kiran	
1998
Bairi Sajna	Raju Singh	Kunal Singh, Kirti Singh	
Batohiya	Ashim Paul	Rakesh Pandey, Meera Madhuri	
Ganga Maiya Tohri Mamta Mahan	Qamar Narvi	Kunal Singh, Padma Khanna	
Mahua	Akash Yogi		
Neha Lagauni Saiyan Se	Jagdish Singh	Rashmi Anand, Yusuf Khan	
Sapna Ke Angna Mein	Akbar Balam	Ram Singh, Farida	
1999
Biyah	Shriman Mishra	Brij Kishore, Vijay Khare	
Dilwa Pe Kehu Ke Jor Nahi	Zulfikar Ali		

== 2000s ==
Title	Director	Cast	Notes
2000
2001
2002
2003
Sasura Bada Paisawala			
2004
Hum Haeen Khalnayak		Jackie Shroff	
Rangli Chunariya Tohre Naam			
2005
Dulha Milal Dildar			
Kab Hoi Gawna Hamar			
2006
Ganga	Abhishek Chhadha	Amitabh Bachchan, Hema Malini, Nagma, Ravi Kishan	
Gabbar Singh		Jeetendra	
2007
Gangotri	Abhishek Chhadha	Amitabh Bachchan, Hema Malini, Manoj Tiwari, Bhumika Chawla	
Janam Janam Ke Saath			
2008
Bhole Shankar			
Khiladi No. 1			
Pratigya			
Rang De Basanti Chola			
2009
Balidaan		Jackie Shroff	

- Dilhin Bani Mor Bahiniya
- Tohar Pyaar Chahi
- Pujiha Charan Mai Baap Ke
- Sathi Sanghatee
- Maai Re Karde Bidaai Hamaar
- Saiyaan Hamaar
- Hamra Se Biyah Karba
- Maai Baap
- Kanyadaan
- Coolie
- Daroga Babu I Love You
- Humke Mafi Dei Da
- Durga Banli Kali
- Rangli Chunariya Tohre Naam Ki
- Sohagan Bana De Sajna Hamaar
- Ghar Dwaar
- Pandit Ji Batai Na Biyah Kab Hoi
- Kab Hoi Milanwa Hamar
- Nadiya Ke Teer
- Bandhan Toote Na
- Hum Hai Bal Bramachari Tu Kanyakunwari
- Dulha Milal Dildar
- Hum Toh Ho Gayi Tohar
- Raja
- Balma 420
- Bandhan Toote Na
- Bhaiya Ke Sasurari Me
- Bidesiya
- Chhodab Na Sang Tohaar
- Devarji
- Dharti Kahe Pukaar ke
- Firangi Dulhniya
- Sabse Bada Mujrim
- Dil
- Gabbarsingh
- Ghar- Duaar
- Halkat Hai Saiyaan Fir Bhi Madhuri Dulhaniya
- Hamri Kokh
- Hum Bal Brahamachari Tu Kanyakunwari
- Kahiya Doli Leke Aiba
- Kanoon Hamra Mutthi Main
- Lagal Raha E Rajaji
- Lahariya Luta E Rajaji
- Maati (2007)
- Nirahua Rickshawwala
- Nirahuaa No. 1
- Pappu Ke Pyaar ho Gayeel
- Parivaar
- Pyaar Ke Bandhan
- Sasura Bada Paisawala
- Saugandh Ganga Maiya Ke
- Tu Hi Mor Baalma
- Saajan Chale Sasural
- Tohse Pyar ba

== 2010s ==
Title	Director	Cast	Notes
2010
Devra Bada Satawela	Rajkumar R. Pandey		
Saat Saheliyan	Rajkumar R. Pandey		
2011
Deswa	Nitin Chandra		
Haamar Devdas	Kirankant Verma		Bhojupuri Devdas film
Elaan	Dhiraj Kumar		
2012
Sajan Chale Sasuraal			
2013
Rajkumar			A remake of Telugu film Bunny
Tohara Ke Thok Deb			A remake of Hindi film Vaastav: The Reality
2014
Nirahua Hindustani			
Adalat			
Aurat Khilona Nahi			
Baazigar			
Bedardi Balma			
Bitiya Sada Suhaghan Rah			
Charnon Ki Saugandh			
Chhapra Ke Prem Kahani			
Dariya Dil			
Deewangi Had Se			
Dil Lagal Dupatta Wali Se			
Ek Laila Teen Chhaila			
Nirahua Ek Sarfira			
Ham Ke Daru Naahi Mehraru Chaahi			
Hathkadi			
Hunterwali			
Insaf Ke Devi			
Inspector Chandani			
Jab Pyar Kiya To Darna Kya			
Jaaneman			
Jo Jeeta Wohi Sikandar			
Jaan Lebu Ka Ho			
Kachche Dhaage			
Kare La Kamaal Dharti Ke Lal			
Katta Tanal Dupatta Par			
Khoon Bhari Hamar Maang			
Laadla			
Maine Dil Tujhko Diya			
Nagina			
Pratigya 2			
Pyaar Hoke Rahi			
Pyar Mohabbat Zindabad			
Raja Ji I Love You			
Saiyya Ji Dilwa Mangelein			
Sajna Mangiya Sajai Da Hamar			
Shola Shabanam			
Tere Naam			
Thok Deb			
Villain Ek Prem Kahani			
Yoddha			
2015
Baaj Gail Danka			
Bagawat			
Patna Se Pakistan			
Bin Bajawa Sapera			
Daroga Chale Sasuraal			
Dil Aur Deewar			
Dulara			
Hero No.1			
Jaan Tere Liye			
Lagi Naahi Chhute Rama			
Lagi Tohse Lagan			
Maai Ke Karz			
Pandit Ji Batai Na Biyah Kab Hoi 2			
Prashashan			
Rakht Boomi			
Saajan Ki Bahon Mein			
Saiyan Jigarbaaz			
Teri Meri Aashiqui			
Tohse Lagal Piritiya Hamaar			
2016
Babua			
Baghi Bhaile Sajna Hamaar			
Ballia Ke Dabangai			
Dulhan Chahi Pakistan Se			
Tridev			
Truck Driver 2			
Mokama 0 km			
Aashik Aawara			
Bam Bam Bol Raha Hai Kashi	Santosh Mishra		
Nirahua Chalal Sasural 2			
Aakhiri Rasta			
Ram Lakhan			
2017'
Beta Hokhe Ta Aisan			
Mehandi Laga Ke Rakhna			
Mai Sehra Bandh Ke Aaunga			
Yodhaa Arjun Pandit			
Aatankwadi			
Sarkar Raj			
Jila Champaran			
Nirahu Satal Rahe			
Satya			
Hum Hai Hindustani			
Tere Jaisa Yaar Kahan			
Jigar			
Sipahi			
Tabadala			
Muqaddar			
Challenge			
Nirahua Hindustani 2			
Kasam Paida Karne Wale Ki			
Dhadkan			
Kashi Amarnath			
Arjun		Mayur Kumar, Shreya Mishra	
2018
Mehandi Laga Ke Rakhna 2		Pradeep Pandey "Chintu", Yash Kumar, Richa Dixit	
Karam Yug		Ritesh Pandey, Priyanka Pandit	
Wanted		Pawan Singh, Akshara Singh	
Awara Balam		Arvind Akela "Kallu", Priyanka Pandit	
Dulhan Ganga Paar Ke		Khesari Lal Yadav, Kajal Raghwani	
Border		Dinesh Lal Yadav, Amrapali Dubey, Shubhi Sharma	
Sangharsh		Khesari Lal Yadav, Kajal Raghwani	
Raja Jani		Khesari Lal Yadav	
Bairi Kangana 2		Ravi Kishan, Kajal Raghwani, Shubhi Sharma	
Goonghat Me Ghotala		Pravesh Lal Yadav, Mani Bhattacharya, Richa Dixit	
Maa Tujhe Salaam		Pawan Singh, Madhu Sharma, Akshara Singh	
Mai Re Mai Hamka Uhe Laiki Chahi		Pradeep Pandey "Chintu", Priti Dhyani	
Chana Jor Garam		Pramod Premi Yadav, Aditya Ozha, Neha Shree	
Sanki Daroga		Ravi Kishan, Anjana Singh	
Nagraj		Yash Kumar, Anjana Singh	
Gangster Dulhaniya		Gaurav Jha, Nidhi Jha	
Munna Mawali		Pramod Premi Yadav, Poonam Dubey	
Balam Ji Love You		Khesari Lal Yadav, Kajal Raghwani	
Loha Pahalwan		Pawan Singh	
Dulhan Chahi Pakistan Se 2		Pradeep Pandey, Rahul Dev	
Dabang Sarkar		Khesari Lal Yadav, Kajal Raghwani	
2019
Kasam Durga Ki		Rani Chatterjee, Manoj R. Pandey, Gurleen Chopra	
Lagal Raha Batasha		Manoj Tiger, Amrapali Dubey	
Nirahua Chalal London		Dinesh Lal Yadav, Amrapali Dubey	
Mandir Wahi Banayenge		Pradeep Pandey, Nidhi Jha	
Sher E Hindustan		Dinesh Lal Yadav, Neeta Dhungana	
Crack Fighter	Sujit Kumar Singh	Pawan Singh, Nidhi Jha	
Special Encounter		Rakesh Mishra, Ritu Singh, Seema Singh	
Dahej Daanav		Akhilesh Kumar, Kalpana Shah	
Saiyaan Ji Dagabaaz		Dinesh Lal Yadav, Anjana Singh	
Coolie No. 1		Khesari Lal Yadav, Kajal Raghwani	
Raja		Pawan Singh, Priti Biswas	
Maine Unko Sajan Chun Liya		Pawan Singh, Kajal Raghwani	
Jai Veeru		Dinesh Lal Yadav, Amrapali Dubey	
Kashi Vishwanath		Ritesh Pandey, Kajal Raghwani	
Rani Weds Raja		Ritesh Pandey, Rani Chatterjee	
Patthar Ke Sanam	Niraj Randhir	Arvind Akela "Kallu", Yamini Singh, Awdhesh Mishra	
Raajtilak		Arvind Akela "Kallu", Sonalika Prasad, Awdhesh Mishra	
Jai Hind		Pawan Singh, Madhu Sharma, Mir Sarwar	
Naayak		Pradeep Pandey, Pawani, Prabhakar	
Gunda		Anjana Singh, Vinod Yadav, Sikandar Khan, Gunjan Pant	
Lallu Ki Laila		Dinesh Lal Yadav, Amrapali Dubey, Yamini Singh, Kamal Pandey	
Baaghi- Ek Yoddha	Shekhar Sharma	Khesari Lal Yadav, Kajal Raghwani, Ritu Singh	
Sher Singh		Pawan Singh, Amrapali Dubey	
Meri Jung Mera Faisla		Khesari Lal Yadav, Moon Moon Ghosh, Awdhesh Mishra	
Vivah	Manjul Thakur	Pradeep Pandey, Sanchita Benarjee	
Sabse Bada Champion	Dhiraj Thakur	Ravi Kishan, Rakhi Sawant, Raju Singh Mahi	

== 2020s ==
- List of Bhojpuri films of 2020
- List of Bhojpuri films of 2021
- List of Bhojpuri films of 2022
- List of Bhojpuri films of 2023
- List of Bhojpuri films of 2024
- List of Bhojpuri films of 2025

== See also ==
- Bhojpuri cinema
- List of Bhojpuri actors
- List of Bhojpuri actresses
- List of Bhojpuri singers
