= Ganga Ghat =

1981 Indian Bhojpuri-language film

- Directed by: Rajpati
- Written by: Rajpati (Screenplay & dialoges)
- Story by: Rajpati
- Produced by: S. N. Maheshwari
- Starring: Sujit Kumar; Prema Narayan
- Cinematography: Ranki Fonseka
- Music by: Nadeem–Shravan
- Production company: M. B. Pictures
- Release date: 1981
- Country: India
- Language: Bhojpuri

Ganga Ghat (Bhojpuri for “Ganges river bank steps”) is a 1981 Indian Bhojpuri-language film directed by Rajpati and produced by S. N. Maheshwari under the banner M. B. Pictures. It stars Sujit Kumar and Prema Narayan in the lead roles, with Chandrakant, Ram Singh, Yunus Parvez, Urmila Bhatt and Shriram Lagoo in supporting roles. The story, screenplay and dialogues were written by Rajpati, and the music was composed by the duo Nadeem–Shravan.

== Plot ==
Shastri Ji, a respected village elder, lives a quiet life with his second wife, Tulsi, and his two sons from different marriages: Shankar, born to his late first wife, and Harihar, the son of his second wife. Shankar’s love interest, Gauri, resides in the same village. Although they are stepbrothers, Shankar and Harihar share a close and unwavering fraternal bond. To secure Harihar’s future, Shankar undertakes strenuous labor on the family farm, using his earnings to support his younger brother’s higher education in the city.

The family's domestic peace is disrupted by Bansi Mama, Tulsi’s brother and Shastri Ji's brother-in-law. Bansi is a manipulative and corrupt man plagued by alcoholism and gambling debts. Bansi exploits a vulnerable village girl named Mangali, resulting in her pregnancy. To evade legal consequences and social ostracization, Bansi orchestrates a conspiracy, forcing Mangali to falsely accuse the innocent Shankar before the village Panchayat (governing council). Prioritizing the honor of the young woman over his personal reputation, Shankar silently accepts the council's mandate to marry Mangali. Deeply traumatized by the public scandal and humiliation, Shastri Ji suffers a fatal shock and passes away. Standing before his father's funeral pyre at the Ganga Ghat, a devastated Shankar swears a solemn oath to uncover and punish the true culprit.

The scandal causes a severe rift of misunderstanding and animosity between the two brothers. Driven by immense guilt, the victimized Mangali writes a letter addressed to her mother, explicitly exposing Bansi’s crimes. She conceals the note beneath her pillow and attempts to flee the village to commit suicide. However, a suspicious Bansi intercepts her, strangles her to permanently silence her, and frames Shankar for the murder.

In an attempt to shield Shankar, his lover, Gauri, tries to claim responsibility for the crime. Nevertheless, Harihar, misled by the fabricated evidence, hands his own brother over to the police. Shankar subsequently escapes custody to clear his name. Following a series of dramatic events, law enforcement authorities recover Mangali's hidden letter, and a forensic post-mortem report confirms her death was caused by strangulation, fully vindicating Shankar. Meanwhile, driven by desperation and greed, Bansi robs and stabs a local moneylender. Before succumbing to his injuries, the wounded moneylender identifies Bansi to the authorities. With his extensive criminal activities fully exposed, Bansi is killed, restoring justice to the victims and reconciling the Shastri family.

== Cast ==
- Sujit Kumar as Shanker
- Prema Narayan as Gauri, Shanker’s love interest
- Chandrakant as Harihar
- Shriram Lagoo as Shastriji
- Urmila Bhatt as Tulsi, Shastriji’s second wife
- C. S. Dubey as Bani Mama, Tulsi’s brother
- Kanchan Mattu as Mangali
- Ram Singh
- Yunus Parvez
- Chand Usmani
- Bhagwan Sinha
- Hari Shukla
- Madhukar Bihari
- Shankar Singh

== Production ==
Ganga Ghat shares cast and creative personnel with two earlier Bhojpuri films, Dangal (1977) and Mai Ka Lal (1979), both commercially successful releases featuring Sujit Kumar and Prema Narayan in the lead roles. Like Ganga Ghat, Mai Ka Lal was also directed by Rajpati, and the music for both Ganga Ghat and Dangal was composed by the renowned Nadeem–Shravan duo, further underscoring the overlap in key cast and creative personnel across the three films. Film scholars have argued that the grouping of successful actors and creative teams, such as repeated star–director–composer combinations, in Indian cinema reflects a strategy by producers to replicate earlier box-office performance by assembling proven combinations of talent to manage commercial uncertainty.

Within this broader commercial context, Kathryn Hardy’s research on Bhojpuri cinema indicates that distributors consistently identify star power—especially that of a well-known male lead—as a primary determinant of a film’s commercial success, on the grounds that major stars are believed to secure strong openings and mitigate financial risk. In this context, the decision by the producers of Ganga Ghat to cast Sujit Kumar in the male lead role reflects the wider emphasis on star-driven films, with press sources describing him as the first “superstar” of Bhojpuri cinema and as one of the industry’s most accomplished actors.

== Soundtrack ==
The film's music was composed by Nadeem–Shravan, with lyrics penned by Rajpati.

No.	Song	Singers	Notes
1	Chahe Paiyan Pada	Aarti Mukherji	
2	Lathi Bhala Chalaila Na	Asha Bhosle	
3	Hum Ho Kishan Bhaiya	Mahendra Kapoor, Chorus	
4	Kab Hoihe Laganwa	Asha Bhosle, Chorus	
5	Khanse Fufuni Mein	Manna Dey	
6	Kedas Kaila Ho	Dilraj Kaur, Chorus	

== Release ==
Ganga Ghat was released in India as a Bhojpuri-language feature film in 1981, during what later scholarship has described as the “old Bhojpuri cinema” period (1960–1990). The film thus belongs to the revival phase of Bhojpuri cinema that followed the release of Dangal (1977), often contrasted with the “new Bhojpuri cinema” that emerged from the late 1990s onwards.

== Reception ==
Scholarly accounts of Bhojpuri cinema note that films such as Ganga Ghat, produced during the “old Bhojpuri cinema” period from the 1960s to the 1990s, attracted little sustained critical coverage in the mainstream press. Ratnakar Tripathy observes that Bhojpuri films “are as a matter of rule not reviewed in newspapers or websites except for promotional commentaries and insertions”, and that there was at the time “a near absence of textual analysis of Bhojpuri cinema either in the press or academic circles” during this period. Film historian Anjani Srivastava similarly remarks on the scarcity of critical documentation of Bhojpuri films from this era. In the absence of published reviews and detailed production reportage, the historical significance of Ganga Ghat is therefore discussed in secondary sources primarily with reference to its ensemble of cast and crew and its place within broader scholarly narratives of early Bhojpuri cinema.
