= Sujit Kumar =

Indian film actor and producer

- Born: 7 February 1934; Chakia, Benares State, British India
- Died: 5 February 2010 (aged 75); Mumbai, Maharashtra, India
- Other name: Sujeet Kumar
- Occupations: Actor, Producer
- Years active: 1960–2001
- Spouse: Kiran Singh (m. 1970; died 2005)
- Children: 2

Sujit Kumar (7 February 1934 – 5 February 2010) was an Indian actor and producer. He appeared in over 150 Hindi films in the 1960s through the 1990s, and in at least 20 Bhojpuri films. Sujit played the major lead actor in many films in Bhojpuri cinema whereas in Hindi films he played pivotal roles either as a villain or as a character actor. One of his most memorable screen appearances was of a friend playing the mouth organ while driving a jeep as Rajesh Khanna's character serenades Sharmila Tagore in the 1969 film Aradhana. Beginning in the late 1980s through the 2000s, Sujit primarily was a film producer. In 1987, his likeness was used by Sega for the character of Shinobi.

== Biography ==
=== Hindi cinema ===
Sujit was the leading man in suspense flicks in Hindi in the early 1960s, including Lal Bangla (1966) and Ek Saal Pehle (1965). He was often part of films with Rajesh Khanna as the lead hero, like in Aradhana, Ittefaq, Aan Milo Sajna, Haathi Mere Saathi, Amar Prem, Mere Jeevan Saathi, Roti, Mehbooba, Avtaar, Aakhir Kyon? and Amrit.

His other notable roles include that of a spy in Ramanand Sagar's Aankein (1968), Naya Raasta (1970), Jugnu (1973), Hamrahi (1974), Charas (1976), Dharamveer (1977), Dev Anand's Des Pardes, The Burning Train, Kaamchor, Krantiveer, Tiranga and many more. Sujit produced small budget movies like Asmaan Se Ooncha (1989) in the 1980s and then subsequently bigger budget films later like Daraar (1996), and Champion.

His best friends from the film industry were Jeetendra and Rakesh Roshan, the two with whom Sujit used to hit the gym regularly. Other close friends included producer Saawan Kumar Tak and Randhir Kapoor, all of whom practically grew up together in the Hindi Film industry since the early 1960s.

=== Bhojpuri cinema ===
He appeared in such films as Bidesiya, Loha Singh, Dangal, Pan Khaye Saiyya Hamar, Champa Chameli, Patoh Bitiya, Sajan Kare Kanyadan, Bairi Bhaile Hamar, Nag Panchami, Saiyya Se Bhaile Milanawa, Aaeel Basant Bahar, Bidhana Nach Nachawe, Mai Ke Lal, Sampurna Teerth Yatra, Sajai Da Maang Hamar, Saiyya Magan Pahalwani Me, Ganga Kahe Pukar Ke, Ganga Jaisan Bhauji Hamar and Ganga Hamar Mai.

=== Death ===
Kumar died in 2010 of cancer, an illness from which he was suffering since 2007. His wife, Kiran Singh predeceased him in 2005; they have two children, son Jatin Kumar, a film producer, and a daughter Henna Singh. A condolence meeting took place on 8 February 2010, at the Indian Medical Association, beside PVR Cinema, Juhu, Mumbai where many of his friends from the industry, like members of the Kapoor family, Rakesh Roshan's family, and Rajesh Khanna's family paid their last respects.

== Filmography ==
=== Bhojpuri films ===
Year	Title	Director	Role	Notes
1963	Bidesiya	S. N. Tripathi	Bidesi Thakur	Lead role with Naaz in lead female role
1965	Ayeel Basant Bahar	Devendra	Chander	Lead role with Naaz in lead female role
1965	Bhouji	Kundan Kumar		Lead role with Kumkum in lead female role
1965	Ganga	Kundan Kumar		Lead role with Kumkum in lead female role
1965	Saiyan Se Bhaile Milanwa	P. L. Santoshi		Lead role with Sayeeda Khan in lead female role
1965	Saiyan Se Neha Lagaibe	S. M. Abbas		Lead role with Naaz in lead female role
1966	Loha Singh	Kundan Kumar		Lead role with Vijaya Chowdhary in lead female role
1968	Vidhana Naach Nachawe	K Prasad Shukla		Lead role with Mumtaz in lead female role
1977	Dangal	Rati Kumar		Lead role with Prema Narayan in lead female role; first color film in Bhojpuri
1979	Mai Ka Lal	Rajpati		Lead role with Prema Narayan in lead female role
1980	Jaagal Bhag Hamaar	S. N. Tripathi		Lead role with Prema Narayan in lead female role
1981	Ganga Ghat	Rajpati	Shanker	Lead role with Prema Narayan in lead female role
1982	Bitiya Bhayeel Sayaan	Radhakant		Multi starrer with Rakesh Pandey as co-lead and Jayshree T. in lead female role
1983	Sajai Da Maang Hamaar	Rati Kumar	Vijay	Lead role with Padma Khanna in lead female role
1983	Sampoorna Tirtha Yatra	Rajpati	Lord Shiva	Multi starrer with Rakesh Pandey as co-lead and Madhu Malini in lead female role
1984	Bhaiya Dooj	Qamar Narvi		Multi starrer with Rakesh Pandey as co-lead and Padma Khanna in lead female role
1984	Paan Khaye Saiyan Hamaar	Himself	Bhola	Lead role with Bandini in lead female role
1984	Saiyan Magan Pahelwani Mein	Radhakant		Multi starrer with Rakesh Pandey as co-lead and Padma Khanna in lead female role
1984	Bairi Sawaan	Prem Singh		Lead role with Rajni Sharma in lead female role
1984	Thakurayeen	Meeni Thakur and Bhagwant Thakur		Lead role with Padma Khanna in lead female role
1985	Ganga Maiya Tohar Kiriya	Naresh Kumar		Lead role with Padma Khanna in lead female role
1986	Ganga Jaisan Bhauji Hamaar	Dilip Bose		Multi starrer with Rakesh Pandey as co-lead and Kanan Kaushal in lead female role
1986	Ganga Hamaar Mai	Dilip Bose		Multi starrer with Rakesh Pandey as co-lead and Naaz in lead female role
1986	Ghar Grihasti	Dilip Bose		Multi starrer with Rakesh Pandey as co-lead and Bandini Mishra in lead female role
1986	Paijaniya	Aslam Sheikh		Lead role with Hina Kausar and Seema Vaz in lead female roles
1986	Tulsi Sohe Hamaar Angna	Rakesh Pandey		Multi starrer with Rakesh Pandey as co-lead and Padma Khanna in lead female role
1987	Dharti Ki Aawaz	KD Singh		Multi starrer with Kunal Singh as co-lead and Padma Khanna in lead female role
1987	Champa Chameli	B Thakur		Lead role with Padma Khanna in lead female role
1987	Sajanwa Bairi Bhaile Hamaar	Dilip Bose	Thakur Pratap Singh	Lead role with Dipika Chikhlia in lead female role
1988	Balma Mora Banka	Triloknath Bhatia		Lead role with Amita Nangia and Seema Vaz in lead female roles
1989	Patoh Bitiya	Aslam Sheikh		Lead role with Bandini in lead female role
1989	Kaisan Banaul Sansar	Dr. Gurdeep		Lead role with Shraddha Verma in lead female role
1990	Bhag Ki Lekha	Kishore Kumar Singh		Lead role with Yasmin Khan in lead female role
1990	Hamaar Betwa	Kishore Kumar Singh		Multi starrer with Kunal Singh as co-lead and Jamuna in lead female role
1990	Piya Toote Na Piritia Hamaar	KD Singh		Multi starrer with Kunal Singh as co-lead and Padma Khanna in lead female role
1990	Pyara Bhaiya	Dibakar Bose		Lead role with Bandini and Seema Vaz in lead female roles
1991	Ganga Kahe Pukaar Ke	Sri Goplal		Multi starrer with Rakesh Pandey as co-lead and Poonam Dasgupta in lead female role
1995	Nehiya Lagawli Vipati Badhawli	Trilok Nath Bhatia		Lead role with Bandini Mishra in lead female role
2004	Vidhana Tohre Des Mein	Shilesh Srivastava		Lead role with Swati Anand in lead female role
2004	Balma Bada Nadaan	Himself	Rehman	Supporting role

=== Hindi films ===
Year	Title	Director	Role	Notes
1960	Honeymoon	Lekhraj Bakri	Nadeem	
1962	China Town	Shakti Samanta	Police Inspector	
1962	Ek Musafir Ek Hasina	Raj Khosla	Police Inspector	
1962	Raaz Ki Baat	Bolton Ci Nagi	Kishore Rai	Lead role with actress Simi Garewal in lead female role
1963	Mere Arman Mere Sapne	Aravind Sen	Prabha's dad	
1964	Door Gagan Ki Chhaon Mein	Kishore Kumar	Dr. D'Silva	
1964	Kohraa	Biren Nag	Ranjan	
1965	Ek Saal Pehle	Dharam Kumar		Lead role with actress Sayeeda Khan in lead female role
1965	Sab Ka Ustad	R Thakur		Lead role with actress Kumkum in lead female role
1966	Labela	Bhagwan Palav	Dr Sujit	Lead role with actress Kumkum in lead female role
1966	Ladka Ladki	Som Haskar	Sujit	
1966	Lal Bangla	Jugal Kishore	Raja	Lead role with actress Jayanthi in lead female role
1966	Pati Patni	SA Akbar	Gupta	
1967	Lamboo in Hong Kong	Harsukh Bhatt		Lead role with actress Kumkum in lead female role
1967	Jaal	Moni Bhattacharjee	Sunder Singh	
1968	Aulad	Kundan Kumar	Dr Mohan	
1968	Lahu Pukarega	S. N. Tripathi		Lead role with actress Shabnam in lead female role
1968	Aankhen	Ramanand Sagar	Nadeem	
1969	Gustakhi Maaf	Rajkumar Bedi	Shankar	
1969	Gunda	Mohammed Hussain		
1969	Dharti Kahe Pukar Ke	Deenanath Shastri	Taxi Driver	
1969	Aradhana	Shakti Samanta	Madan Verma	Arun Verma's friend, playing the mouth organ in the song "Meri Sapno Ki Rani Kab Aayengi Tu"
1969	Ittefaq	Yash Chopra	Police Inspector Diwan	
1970	Maharaja	Naresh Saigal	Shyamu	
1970	Geet	Ramanand Sagar	Kunver Shamsher Singh	
1970	Man Ki Ankhen	Raghunath Jhalani	Naresh Aggarwal	
1970	Mangu Dada	Maruti	Kunver Shamsher Singh	Lead role with actress Faryal in lead female role
1970	Murder on Highway	Dharam Kumar	Kunver Shamsher Singh	Lead role with actress Sayeeda Khan in lead female role
1970	Maa Aur Mamta	Asit Sen		
1970	Naya Raasta	Khalid Akthar	Ramu	
1970	Aan Milo Sajna	Mukul Dutt	Mohan	
1970	Pardesi	Kundan Kumar		
1971	Naag Pooja	Shantilal Soni		Lead role with actress Sanjana in lead female role
1971	Murder in Circus	Dharam Kumar		Lead role with actress Jaymala in lead female role
1971	Haathi Mere Saathi	M. A. Thirumugham	Gangu	
1971	Ek Din Aadhi Raat	Kamal Sharma	Ashok	Lead role with actress Kumkum in lead female role
1971	Bikhre Moti	Tapi Chanakya	Gopi	
1971	Gehra Raaz	Niranjan	Ranjan	Lead role with actress Sofia in lead female role
1971	Haseenon Ka Devata	Ravikant Nagaich	Gopal	
1972	Putlibai	Ashok Rai		Lead role with actress Jaymala in lead female role
1972	Yeh Gulistan Hamara	Atma Ram	Teju	
1972	Gaon Hamara Shaher Tumhara	Naresh Kumar	Shyam C. Pandey	
1972	Tangewala	Naresh Kumar	Zamindar	
1972	Amar Prem	Shakti Samanta	Mahesh Sharma	
1972	Mere Jeevan Saathi	Ravikant Nagaich		
1972	Bandagi	K Shanker	Kumar	
1972	Jaanwar Aur Insaan	Tapi Chanakya	Mohan	
1972	Jai Jwala	Manohar Deepak	Thakur Ranjeet Singh	Lead role with actress Nazneen in lead female role
1972	Lalkar	Ramanand Sagar		
1972	Parchhaiyan	Sharankumar Chand	Mohan	
1972	Shararat	Manmohan Desai	Vinod Kumar	
1973	Chhalia	Mukul Dutt		
1973	Jalte Badan	Ramanand Sagar		
1973	Jhoom Utha Akash	Y.N. Kapoor		Lead role with actress Laxmi Chhaya in lead female role
1973	Jugnu	Pramod Chakravarty	Ghanshyam Das	
1973	Jwaar Bhata	A Subba Rao	Ramesh Khanna	
1973	Naag Mere Saathi	Shantilal Soni		Lead role with actress Sanjana in lead female role
1973	Nirdosh	S. M. Sagar	Shanker	
1973	Raja Rani	Sachin Bhowmick	Ravi	
1973	Rickshawala	K. Shanker	Manohar	
1973	Suraj Aur Chanda	T. Madhava Rao	Maan Singh	
1973	Vishnu Puran	Shridhar Prasad		
1973	Wohi Raat Wohi Awaaz	Dev Kishan		
1973	Yauwan	Ranjan Bose	Roop	
1974	Insaaniyat	Prayag Raj	Ram	
1974	Hamrahi	Anand Sagar	Sujit	
1974	Amir Garib	Mohan Kumar	Police Inspector Anand	
1974	Resham Ki Dori	Atma Ram	Dinesh	
1974	Albeli	Karunesh Thakur		
1974	Badla	Vijay	Inspector Joshi	
1974	Charitraheen	Shakti Samanta	Mr Khosla	
1974	Roti	Manmohan Desai	Inspector	
1975	Do Jasoos	Naresh Kumar	G L Sippy	
1975	Sunehra Sansar	A. Subba Rao	Mohan	
1975	Warrant	Pramod Chakravorty	Thompson	
1975	Aakraman	J Om Prakash	Pratap Singh	
1975	Badnaam	Dilip Bose	Advocate	
1975	Lafange	Harmesh Malhotra	Beauty Contest Judge	
1975	Phanda	Somesh Joshi & V Mhatre		
1976	Aadalat	Narendra Bedi	Sujit Singh	
1976	Aap Beati	Mohan Kumar	Prakash Kapoor	
1976	Barood	Pramod Chakravorty	Ratan	
1976	Charas	Ramanand Sagar	Shaikh	
1976	Mehbooba	Shakti Samanta	Dr. Vinod	
1976	Bairaag	Asit Sen		
1976	Do Shatru	Kewal Misra	Diwan Samsher Singh	
1976	Fauji	Joginder Shelly		
1977	Farishta Ya Qatil	S. M. Abbas	Gautam	
1977	Kalabaaz	Ashok Roy	Malhotra	
1977	Dildaar	K Bapaiah	Chokelal	
1977	Ram Bharose	Anand Sagar	David	
1977	Dharam Veer	Manmohan Desai	Rajkumar Sujan Singh	
1977	Kasam Khoon Ki	Ashok Roy	Laxman	
1977	Aadmi Sadak Ka	Devendra Goel	Madanmohan	
1977	Dream Girl	Pramod Chakravarty	Sardar of the gypsies	
1977	Ladki Jawan Ho Gayi	Anand Dasani		
1977	Zamaanat	A Salaam	Rocky	
1978	Des Pardes	Dev Anand	Gangaram	
1978	Nalayak	Padmanabh	Prem	
1978	Aakhri Daku	Prakash Mehra		
1978	Trishna	Anil Ganguly	Vidya's husband	
1979	Aatish	Ambrish Sangal	Khan	
1979	The Great Gambler	Shakti Samanta	Marconi	
1979	Khandaan	Anil Ganguly	Vikas G. Srivastav	
1979	Dhongee	Ashok Roy	Ravi Khanna	
1979	Gawaah	A Salaam		
1979	Hum Tere Ashiq Hain	Prem Sagar	Jackson	
1979	Jaandaar	SK Lutha	Robert D'Souza	
1979	Ladke Baap Se Badke	Subhash Mukherjee	Police Inspector	
1979	Teen Cheharey	YN Kapoor	Police Officer	Lead role with actress Anjana Mumtaz in lead female role
1980	Guest House	Shyam Ramsay & Tulsi Ramsay	Kalia	
1980	Dhan Daulat	Harish Shah	Sudhir Kumar	
1980	The Burning Train	Ravi Chopra	Inspector Ranveer	
1980	Agreement	Anil Ganguly	Deepak	
1980	Takkar	K Bapaiah	Police Inspector	
1980	Abdullah	Sanjay Khan	Jameel	
1980	Insaaf Ka Tarazu	BR Chopra	Owner of Ad Agency	
1980	Ram Balram	Vijay Anand	Daku Satarawala	
1980	Shaan	Ramesh Sippy		
1980	Badla Aur Balidan	Kawal Sharma	Thakur Pratap Singh	
1980	Khwab	Shakti Samanta	Biharilal Khanna	
1980	Patita	IV Sasi	Inspector Dilip	
1980	Unees Bees	Swaroop Kumar	Ajeet	
1981	Bhula Na Dena	Harsh Kohli	Thakur Vikram Singh	
1981	Barsaat Ki Ek Raat	Shakti Samanta	Pradhan	
1981	Raaz	Harmesh Malhotra	Sujeet	
1981	Bharosa	Meraj		
1981	Dahshat	Shyam Ramsay & Tulsi Ramsay	Inspection Officer	
1981	Jeene Ki Arzoo	Rajashekhar		
1981	Pahari Phul	Sridip Ghosh		
1982	Gopichand Jasoos	Naresh Kumar	Kaliram	
1982	Kaamchor	K Vishwanath	Sohan	
1982	Karwat	Anil Ganguly		
1982	Ayaash	Shakti Samanta	Shanker	
1982	Baghavat	Ramanand Sagar	Sarju	
1982	Dial 100	S Ramanathan	Raju	
1982	Jogi	Huda Bihari		
1982	Maut Ka Saya	Tulsi Ramsay		
1983	Avtaar	Mohan Kumar	Bawaji	
1983	Arpan	J Om Prakash	Ashok	
1983	Pukar	Ramesh Behl	Hasmukh	
1983	Ganga Meri Maa	Shyam Ralhan		
1983	Lal Chunariya	Sundarshen Lal	Amarnath	
1983	Mahaan	S Ramanathan	Rajan	
1983	Shubh Kaamna	K Vishwanath	Jagannath	
1984	Boxer	Raj Sippy	Police Inspector Khatau	
1984	Qaidi	SS Ravichandra	Police Inspector	
1984	Yaadgar	Dasari Narayana Rao	Suresh	
1984	All Rounder	Mohan Kumar	Ritu's dad	
1984	Bhemaa	Dinesh Saxena	Madhav Singh	
1984	Ek Zindgi Arman Bhari	PN Ghoshal		
1984	Hum Rahe Na Hum	Cheatan Anand & Ketan Anand	Indar	
1984	Jaag Utha Insaan	K Vishwanath	Ramnarayan Chaturvedi	
1984	Jagir	Pramod Chakravorty	Bandit	
1984	Mujhe Shakti Do	Sharad Chaudhary	Janardan	
1985	Haveli	Keshu Ramsay	Blackmailer	
1985	Haqeeqat	Rama Rao Tatineni	Surajpal Singh	
1985	Aakhir Kyon?	J Om Prakash	Kumar	
1985	Kali Basti	Sudesh Issar	Police Inspector	
1985	Mera Saathi	K Raghuvendra Rao	Police Inspector	
1985	Salma	Ramanand Sagar	Akbar Mirza	
1986	Anubhav	Kashinath	Mamaji	
1986	Dharm Adhikari	K Raghuvendra Rao	Inspector	
1986	Kala Dhanda Goray Log	Sanjay Khan	Inspector Shiva Singh	
1986	Amrit	Mohan Kumar	Doctor	
1986	Ek Aur Sikander	Bhasker Shetty		
1986	Avinash	Umesh Mehra	Police Inspector Rajan	
1986	Nafrat	Anup Malik	Teja	
1986	Bhagwaan Dada	J Om Prakash	Haji Ghaffoor Ali Khan	
1986	Bhai Ka Dushman Bhai	Sudesh Issar		
1986	Kismetwala	SD Narang		
1986	Pachhtava	Anil Ghosh		
1986	Singhasan	Krishna	Head of the Jury	
1987	Kamagni	Ashok Kumar		
1987	Mera Yaar Mera Dushman	Anil Ganguly	Gopal	
1987	Dak Bangla	Keshu Ramsay	Jagga	
1987	Hiraasat	Surendra Mohan	Renu’s dad	
1987	108Teerthyatra	Rajpati	Bhagwan Shri Bholeynathji	
1988	Bhed Bhav	Navin Kumar		
1988	Faisla	S Ramanathan	Vikram	
1988	Rukhsat	Simi Garewal	Sharma	
1989	Asmaan Se Ooncha	Mehul Kumar	Police Commissioner	
1989	Aakhri Baazi	Ashim Samanta	Police Commissioner	
1989	Kala Bazaar	Rakesh Roshan	Girdharilal	
1989	Na Insaafi	Mehul Kumar	D.C.P. Khanna	
1989	Bade Ghar Ki Beti	Kalpataru	Hiralal	
1989	Dost	K Murali Mohana Rao	Brijmohan	
1989	Dost Garibon Ka	CP Dixit	Prosecuting Attorney	
1989	Loot Taraj	Prashant Nanda		
1989	Mahal	Keshu Ramsay		
1989	Parchhaeen	Om Narayan Tomar	Satish	
1989	Tujhe Nahin Chhodunga	Iqbal Khan		
1989	Yari Dosti	Anup Malik		
1990	Kishen Kanhaiya	Rakesh Roshan	Bholaram	
1990	Amba	Mohan Kumar	Bhiku, Servant	
1990	Dard Ki Awaaz	Trilokenath Bhatia		
1990	Kali Ganga	Raj Sippy		
1990	Maa O Maa	Kishor Kumar Singh	Thakur Ram Singh	
1991	Aakhri Cheekh	Kiran Ramsay	Father Robert	
1991	Qurbani Rang Layegi	Raj Sippy	Jai Kishan	
1992	Khel	Rakesh Roshan	Principal / Father	
1992	Yeh Raat Phir Na Aayegi	Nusrat Sayeed	Jagannath	
1993	Tirangaa	Mehul Kumar	Police Commissioner	
1993	Dosti Ki Saugandh	Mohanji Prasad		
1994	Krantiveer	Mehul Kumar	Police Commissioner	
1994	Laqshya	Bhagwan Thakur		
2001	Inteqam	Aslam Azmi	Dilip Navin	

=== Bengali films ===
Year	Title	Director	Role	Notes
1982	Troyee	Gautam Mukherjee	Ranjan's father	Debut as an actor in a Begali film
1990	Bhagyalipi	Himself	Ratan	Debut as a director in a Bengali film

=== Punjabi films ===
Year	Title	Director	Role	Notes
1974	Do Sher	Sukhdev Ahluwalia		Debut as an actor in a Punjabi film
1977	Nachdi Jawani	Som Haksar		
1978	Jindri Yaar Di	Dharam Kumar	Puran	
1978	Giddha	B. S. Shaad	Sarpanch	

=== Oriya films ===
Year	Title	Director	Role	Notes
1989	Topaye Sindura Dipata Shankha	JH Sattar		Lead role with actress Jharana Das in lead female role

=== Producer ===
- 1986 : Anubhav
- 1989 : Aasmaan se Ooncha
- 1992 : Khel
- 1996: Daraar
- 2000: Champion
- 2004 : Aetbaar
- 1991 : Ganga Kahe Pukar Ke

He also acted in Zee horror show's episode Dahshat 1994–1995
