= Piya Toote Na Piritia Hamaar =

1990 Indian Bhojpuri-language film

- Directed by: K.D. Singh
- Written by: K.D. Singh (story and dialog)
- Screenplay by: K.D. Singh
- Produced by: Bhuvneshwar Jha; Jawahar Lal Jha
- Starring: Sujit Kumar; Kunal Singh; Padma Khanna
- Music by: Omkar
- Production company: Jawahar Pictures Palace Productions
- Release date: 1990
- Running time: 150 minutes
- Country: India
- Language: Bhojpuri

Piya Toote Na Piritia Hamaar (Bhojpuri for “Our love won’t break”) is a 1990 Indian Bhojpuri-language film directed by K.D. Singh. The film stars Sujit Kumar, Kunal Singh and Padma Khanna in the lead roles, with Huma Khan, Manoj Verma, and Bandini Mishra appearing in supporting roles. The film’s story, screenplay, and dialogue were written by K.D. Singh, with music composed by Omkar.

== Cast ==
- Sujit Kumar
- Kunal Singh
- Padma Khanna
- Huma Khan
- Manoj Verma
- Bandini Mishra
- Shweta
- Hari Shukla
- Seema Vaz

== Production and background ==
Piya Toote Na Piritia Hamaar was produced under the banner of Jawahar Picture Palace Productions by Bhuvneshwar Jha and Jawaharlal Jha shortly after the release of their film Ganga Ki Beti (1986), a box office success of the Bhojpuri cinema and a film that has been identified as a "significant milestone" in the regional industry's development. Building on the momentum of Ganga Ki Beti, the producers again enlisted director K. D. Singh—who had helmed the earlier film—and retained Onkar as music composer, continuing the creative partnership established in their previous collaboration. Film scholars have argued that the grouping of successful creative teams, such as repeated director–composer combinations, in Indian cinema reflects a strategy by producers to replicate earlier box-office performance by assembling proven combinations of talent to manage commercial uncertainty.

The prominence of Piya Toote Na Piritia Hamaar also derives from the cast assembled by its producers, a choice that aligns with broader patterns in Bhojpuri cinema. Kathryn Hardy’s research shows that distributors consistently regard star power—particularly that of a well known male lead—as a central factor in determining commercial success, since major stars are believed to deliver strong openings and reduce financial risk. Within this context, the decision to cast Sujit Kumar in the male lead role reflects the prevailing emphasis on star driven productions; press accounts describe him as the first “superstar” of Bhojpuri cinema and as one of the industry’s most accomplished actors. His co lead, Kunal Singh, had by then become one of Bhojpuri cinema’s most bankable stars through a succession of commercially successful films, culminating in his receipt of the Rashtra Kavi Dinkar Sammaan from Pranab Mukherjee, the President of India.

== Soundtrack ==
The film's soundtrack was composed by Omkar, with lyrics penned by Sameer.

No.	Song	Singers
1	Maza Mare Tora Jhumka	Poornima Shrestha; Udit Narayan
2	Shaadi Shaadi	Kavita Krishnamurthy; Shabbir Kumar
3	Gayi Bambai Delhi Kolkatta	Usha Mangeshkar
4	Sonoba Ki Khidki	Dilraj Kaur
5	Desi Daru Ka Theka Tohar Akhiya	Mohammed Aziz
6	Palana Mein Khele Lalana	Vinod Rathod
7	Darada Nehi Ho Rama	Dilraj Kaur

== Release ==
Piya Toote Na Piritia Hamaar was released in India in 1990 as a Bhojpuri language feature film during a period within the broader phase of the “old Bhojpuri cinema” (1960s to the 1990s). Its release is generally situated within the revival that followed Dangal (1977), a period often contrasted with the “new Bhojpuri cinema” that emerged from the late 1990s onward.

== Reception ==
Studies of Bhojpuri cinema indicate that films produced during the “old Bhojpuri cinema” era (1960s–1990s), including Piya Toote Na Piritia Hamaar, rarely received sustained critical engagement in mainstream media. Ratnakar Tripathy observes that Bhojpuri films “are as a matter of rule not reviewed in newspapers or websites except for promotional commentaries and insertions,” and notes the “near absence of textual analysis of Bhojpuri cinema either in the press or academic circles” during this period. Film historian Anjani Srivastava similarly highlights the limited archival and critical documentation available for Bhojpuri films of this era. Owing to this scarcity of contemporary reviews and production reportage, secondary discussions of Piya Toote Na Piritia Hamaar generally focus on its cast–crew combination and its placement within broader historical narratives of early Bhojpuri filmmaking.
