= Bitiya Bhayeel Sayaan =

1982 Indian Bhojpuri-language film

- Directed by: Radhakant
- Written by: Anirudh Tiwari (story and dialogue)
- Screenplay by: Anirudh Tiwari
- Produced by: Dhaneshwar Singh
- Starring: Jayshree T. Sujit Kumar; Rakesh Pandey
- Music by: Chitragupt
- Production company: Zarina Productions
- Release date: 1982
- Running time: 143 minutes
- Country: India
- Language: Bhojpuri

Bitiya Bhayeel Sayaan (Bhojpuri for “My daughter has grown up”) is a 1982 Indian Bhojpuri-language film directed by Radhakant and produced under the banner of Zarina Productions. The film stars Jayshree T., Sujit Kumar and Rakesh Pandey in the lead roles. The story, screenplay and dialogues were written by Anirudh Tiwari, and the music was composed by Chitragupt.

Prior to this film, Jayshree T. had appeared in supporting roles in productions such as Mai Ka Lal, in which Sujit Kumar played the male lead; Bitiya Bhayeel Sayaan marked the first occasion on which Jayshree T. and Sujit Kumar were paired together as lead actors.

== Plot ==
The film follows a young bride whose life is abruptly upended when her husband inexplicably abandons her shortly after their wedding. Left without familial support and facing intense social stigma as an abandoned woman, she is forced to join a local Nautanki troupe to survive. She soon finds herself trapped in the troupe's dark and unfair side, which severely limits her chances of ever returning to a normal domestic life.

During one of her performances, she draws the attention of a sympathetic man who learns the truth about her past. Recognizing her plight, he intervenes and helps her escape the predatory environment of the troupe. The remainder of the story focuses on her struggle to rehabilitate her reputation, navigate the rigid societal pressures placed upon women in her position, and forge a new life with the assistance of her rescuer, as they confront the lingering consequences of her past.

== Cast ==
- Jayshree T. as the young bride abandoned by her husband
- Sujit Kumar as the bride’s husband
- Rakesh Pandey as the admirer of the bride performing in the Nautanki stage

== Production and Background ==
Bitiya Bhayeel Sayaan was produced by Dhaneshwar Singh shortly after his earlier Bhojpuri production Saiyan Tore Karan (1981), which was also directed by Radhakant.

Radhakant substantially reduced production costs of Bitiya Bhayeel Sayaan by initially shooting the film on 16 mm before blowing it up to 35 mm, deliberately minimizing the use of long shots to prevent noticeable film grain from appearing in the final print. The budget was further optimized by filming extensively in Rajpipla, a former princely town in southern Gujarat that became highly popular as a filming hub for Bhojpuri cinema, earning a reputation as the "desi Switzerland" for low-budget productions. Radhakant noted that the production was able to affordably house the entire crew and film scenes directly at the local palace in Rajpipla.

In Bhojpuri cinema, distributors and producers have historically relied on star power—particularly well-known male leads—to secure strong box office openings and mitigate financial risk. Bitiya Bhayeel Sayaan featured an ensemble cast centered on two such prominent actors. Sujit Kumar, widely regarded as the first superstar of Bhojpuri films, co-starred alongside Rakesh Pandey, a major actor of the 1980s. They were joined by Jayshree T. as the female lead, marking the first time these three actors were teamed together in lead roles in a Bhojpuri film. All three leads were later recognized for their industry contributions with the Bhojpuri Film Awards Lifetime Achievement Award between 2007 and 2009.

== Soundtrack ==
The music for Bitiya Bhayeel Sayaan was composed by Chitragupt, with lyrics written by Anjaan.

| No. | Title | Singer(s) |
|---|---|---|
| 1 | "Raja Tori Bagiya Se" | Asha Bhosle, Suresh Wadkar |
| 2 | "Udh Jaai Muniya" | Asha Bhosle |
| 3 | "Anchara Mein Mamta" | Bhupendra |
| 4 | "Kaha Chamki" | Suresh Wadkar |
| 5 | "Tori Aankhiya Ke" | Suresh Wadkar, Usha Mangeshkar |
| 6 | "Saaj Ke Aayi" | Hemlata, Usha Mangeshkar |
| 7 | "Jogira" | Murlidhar |

== Release ==
Bitiya Bhayeel Sayaan had its Indian theatrical release in 1982. Contemporary film scholars categorize productions from this era (1960s to the 1990s) as belonging to the "old Bhojpuri cinema" movement. This places the film squarely within the industry's post-Dangal (1977) revival phase, a period distinct from the "new Bhojpuri cinema" wave that began in the late 1990s.

== Reception ==
Mainstream media during the 1960s through the 1990s rarely provided sustained critical analysis for regional films like Bitiya Bhayeel Sayaan. According to Ratnakar Tripathy, press coverage of Bhojpuri cinema largely consisted of "promotional commentaries and insertions" rather than traditional reviews, leading to a "near absence of textual analysis... either in the press or academic circles." This lack of archival reviews and critical documentation from the "old Bhojpuri" era is also corroborated by film historian Anjani Srivastava. Consequently, modern evaluations of the film rely less on contemporaneous box office reporting and more on its historical relevance—particularly its notable ensemble cast, economical production methods, and its broader context within the industry's 1980s revival.
