= Sajai Da Maang Hamaar =

1983 Indian Bhojpuri-language film

- Directed by: Rati Kumar
- Written by: Vishwanath Pandey (story and dialogue)
- Screenplay by: Vishwanath Pandey
- Produced by: Sarju Prasad; K.S. Singh
- Starring: Sujit Kumar; Padma Khanna
- Cinematography: Prakash Malhotra
- Music by: Nadeem–Shravan
- Production company: Sarju Films Combines
- Release date: 1983
- Running time: 131 minutes
- Country: India
- Language: Bhojpuri

Sajai Da Maang Hamaar (Bhojpuri for “Marry me”) is a 1983 Indian Bhojpuri-language feature film directed by Rati Kumar. The film stars Sujit Kumar and Padma Khanna in the lead roles with supporting roles performed by Kanhaiyalal, Leela Mishra, Nana Palsikar, and Hari Shukla. The film features a story, screenplay, and dialogues written by Vishwanath Pandey, with a musical score composed by the duo Nadeem–Shravan.

== Plot ==
Vijay, a hardworking and robust young villager, lives with his widowed mother and his younger sister, Munni. In the same village resides Kasturi, a talented Nautanki performer who belongs to an untouchable caste and lives with her father. Although Kasturi becomes the object of unwanted, aggressive attention from Ram Singh—the nephew of a wealthy and influential Thakur of the village—she and Vijay gradually fall deeply in love and form a genuine romantic bond. Ram Singh, driven by jealousy and entitlement, cannot tolerate their relationship.

Vijay works tirelessly to arrange Munni’s marriage to a young man named Brijesh. Determined to secure the necessary bridal jewelry and dowry, but finding himself short of funds, Vijay borrows money from Panditji, the village's corrupt moneylender. Vijay travels to the city, purchases the required jewelry, and begins his journey back. However, Panditji and Ram Singh conspire together, orchestrating an ambush. Their henchmen attack Vijay, leaving him severely injured, and rob him of the wedding jewelry.

Because of the robbery, Vijay fails to produce the jewelry by the wedding day. Consequently, Brijesh's father, who is the influential village Sarpanch, calls off the wedding, and the wedding procession prepares to return home. This loss plunges Vijay's family into a severe crisis; distraught and deeply ashamed by the canceled wedding, Munni attempts suicide by jumping into a river, though Vijay rescues her.

Hoping to alleviate Vijay's intense suffering, Kasturi takes matters into her own hands. To salvage Munni’s marriage, Kasturi goes to Ram Singh and agrees to submit to his demands in exchange for the stolen bundle of jewelry. She successfully retrieves the jewelry and rushes it to the wedding venue. However, because Kasturi belongs to an untouchable caste, the Sarpanch falsely concludes that Vijay and the performer are having an illicit affair. Despite her sacrifice, the wedding procession still returns home.

Heartbroken, Brijesh leaves his home and goes to the city. There, he falls gravely ill, and Kasturi discovers him, taking great care of him during his illness. Upon learning of her profound kindness and selflessness, the Sarpanch wishes to reward Kasturi. Instead of money, Kasturi requests a priceless reward: that the Sarpanch accept Vijay's sister, Munni, into his home as his daughter-in-law.

The Sarpanch agrees to honor the request, but on one condition: his own niece must be married to Vijay. Subsequent to this complex deal, the corruption and conspiracy of Panditji and Ram Singh are fully exposed, leading to their ultimate downfall. With justice served, Munni finally reaches her marital home and is happily reunited with Brijesh. Meanwhile, due to this final twist of fate and the resolution of the deal, Vijay ends up marrying Kasturi, allowing the two lovers to finally come together.

== Cast ==
- Sujit Kumar as Vijay
- Padma Khanna as Kasturi
- Kanhaiyalal as Panditji
- Leela Mishra as Panditji’s wife
- Nana Palsikar as the village Sarpanch
- Vishal as Brijesh, the son of the Sarpanch
- S. N. Tripathi as the Thakur
- Hari Shukla as Ram Singh, as the Thakur’s nephew
- Kripa Shankar as Kasturi’s father
- Jayshree T. as Munni
- Uma Dhawan as Vijay and Usha’s mother
- Meena T.
- Dev Malhotra
- Rajendra Khanna
- Ramchandra Vishwakarma
- Madhukar Bihari

== Production and background ==
Sajai Da Maang Hamaar was produced by Sarju Prasad and K.S. Singh under the production banner Sarju Films Combines. The film’s prominence derives largely from the cast assembled by its producers. Kathryn Hardy’s research on Bhojpuri cinema shows that distributors consistently viewed star power—especially a well-known male lead—as central to a film’s commercial prospects, because major stars were believed to ensure strong openings and reduce financial risk. In that context, Prasad and Singh’s decision to cast Sujit Kumar as the male lead reflected the industry’s broader emphasis on star-driven films. Press sources describe Kumar as the first “superstar” of Bhojpuri cinema and one of the industry’s most accomplished actors. Additionally, Padma Khanna, the female lead of the film, has also been described as a “superstar” of Bhojpuri cinema.

== Soundtrack ==
The film's music was composed by Nadeem–Shravan, with lyrics written by Maya Govind, Lakshman Shahabadi, and K. K. Shahi.

Soundtrack
No.	Song	Singers
1	"Dil Ke Khali"	Suresh Wadkar
2	"Sajai Do Mang"	Asha Bhosle
3	"Kabhi Paao Mein Ka"	Suresh Wadkar, Aarti Mukherji
4	"Rim Jhim Barse"	Asha Bhosle, Chorus
5	"Najaria Ka Khel"	Dilraj Kaur
6	"Manga Sindur Lagi"	Asha Bhosle, Usha Mangeshkar

== Release ==
Sajai Da Maang Hamaar debuted in India in 1987. Academic scholars classify it as a release within the "old Bhojpuri cinema" era spanning from the 1960s to 1990s. The feature film belongs to the industry's historic mid-stage revival sparked by the 1977 movie Dangal. Experts separate releases within this specific era from releases within the "new Bhojpuri cinema" wave that emerged in the late 1990s.

== Reception ==
Sajai Da Maang Hamaar and its contemporary releases belonging to the "old Bhojpuri cinema" era faced a near-total lack of rigorous critique in mainstream media. According to Ratnakar Tripathy, Bhojpuri films “are as a matter of rule not reviewed in newspapers or websites except for promotional commentaries and insertions,” resulting in “a near absence of textual analysis of Bhojpuri cinema either in the press or academic circles” at the time. Historians, including Anjani Srivastava, document very limited archival coverage of this era. In the absence of contemporary reviews, secondary sources discuss Sajai Da Maang Hamaar chiefly in terms of its cast and crew and its position in broader histories of early Bhojpuri cinema.
