= List of Bhojpuri films of 2020 =

2020's Bhojpuri films

This is a list of Bhojpuri language films released in 2020.

== January- December ==
Release date	Film	Cast
	Saato Janam	Kritn Ajitesh; Payashi Pandit
	Veer Arjun	Priyesh Sinha; Payashi Pandit
	Laila Majnu	Pradeep Pandey; Akshara Singh; Sonalika Prasad
	Muqaddar Ka Sikandar	Dinesh Lal Yadav; Amrapali Dubey
	Ek Saazis Jaal	Khesari Lal Yadav; Shubhi Sharma
10 March 2020	Mehandi Laga Ke Rakhna 3	Khesari Lal Yadav; Sahar Afsha
	Pawan Putra	Pawan Singh; Priyanka Pandit; Mir Sarwar
