= Sajanwa Bairi Bhaile Hamaar =

1987 Indian Bhojpuri-language film

- Directed by: Dilip Bose
- Written by: Dilip Bose (story); Aniruddh Tiwari (dialog)
- Screenplay by: Dilip Bose
- Produced by: Shiv Kumar Dammani
- Starring: Sujit Kumar; Deepika Chikhalia; Manoj Verma
- Cinematography: Bhanwarlal Verma
- Music by: Chitragupt
- Production company: Dammani Pictures
- Release date: 1987
- Running time: 163 minutes
- Country: India
- Language: Bhojpuri

Sajanwa Bairi Bhaile Hamaar (Bhojpuri for “My lover has become my enemy”) is a 1987 Indian Bhojpuri-language film directed by Dilip Bose. It stars Sujit Kumar, Deepika Chikhalia and Manoj Verma in the lead roles, with Vinod Tiwari, Ram Mohan and Leela Mishra in supporting roles. The film’s story and screenplay was penned by Dilip Bose whereas the dialogues were written by Aniruddh Tiwari. The soundtrack was composed by Chitragupt.

== Plot ==
Returning from his studies in the United States, Vijay is eager to take the reins of his widowed father’s grand sugar estate. The estate's ancestral haveli is inhabited primarily by his father, the Thakur Pratap Singh; the Thakur’s loyal servant, Dashrat; and the Thakur’s widowed sister alongside her scheming son, Ranjeet. Unbeknown to the Thakur, his sister and Ranjeet have been systematically siphoning millions from the sugar business. Desperate to hide their embezzlement from the US-educated heir, they plot to eliminate Vijay.

Meanwhile, Vijay rekindles his bond with a childhood friend, Birju, and falls deeply in love with Birju’s sister, Laajo. Driven by pride and tradition, the Thakur fiercely opposes the match. Choosing love over his inheritance, Vijay marries Laajo anyway and is promptly cast out into the cold.

Exploiting Vijay’s sudden vulnerability, Ranjeet launches an ambush. During the chaotic brawl, a henchman is gravely wounded, and Vijay is framed for attempted murder and sent to prison. Tragically, the heartbreak of the scandal and exile kills Laajo’s mother.

Left destitute, a pregnant Laajo takes a job as a housemaid—unwittingly landing in the Thakur’s own mansion, where Dashrat helps look after her. Over time, the solitary Thakur unknowingly warms up to his new servant and forms a deep bond with her newborn child, his own unrecognized grandchild.

Driven by desperation, Vijay breaks out of prison to locate his wife and son. His frantic return sets off a rapid sequence of events that unmasks his aunt and Ranjeet's web of deceit, clears Vijay's name, and ultimately reunites the family.

== Cast ==
- Sujit Kumar as Thakur Pratap Singh
- Manoj Verma as Vijay, the Thakur’s son
- Deepika Chikhalia as Laajo, Vijay’s love interest
- Vinod Tiwari, as Ranjeet, the Thakur’s nephew
- Ram Mohan, as Dashrat, the Thukur’s loyal servant
- Leela Mishra, as the mother of Laajo and Birju
- Master Bunty, as Laajo and Vijay’s son
- Chand Prakash Tiwari, as Birju, Vijay’s childhood friend
- Beena Roy
- Ashok Pandey
- Manik Chaudhary
- Bharat Bhushan (guest appearance) as a Banjara visiting the village
- Kimi Katkar (guest appearance) as a nautanki dancer visited by Ranjeet
- Anita Raj (guest appearance)

== Production and background ==
Sajanwa Bairi Bhaile Hamaar was produced by Shiv Kumar Dammani under his banner, Dammani Pictures. The film’s prominence derives largely from the cast assembled by Dammani. Kathryn Hardy’s research on Bhojpuri cinema shows that distributors consistently viewed star power—especially a well-known male lead—as central to a film’s commercial prospects, because major stars were believed to ensure strong openings and reduce financial risk. In that context, Dammani’s decision to cast Sujit Kumar as the male lead reflected the industry’s broader emphasis on star-driven films. Press sources describe Kumar as the first “superstar” of Bhojpuri cinema and one of the industry’s most accomplished actors. The film was directed by Dilip Bose, whom reliable sources describe as “undisputably the most successful Bhojpuri film director of the 1980s.” It was Bose’s fourth film with Kumar in the lead role and his first in which Kumar did not share lead billing with Rakesh Pandey.

== Soundtrack ==
The film's soundtrack was composed by Chitragupt, with lyrics penned by Sameer.

No.	Song	Singers
1	Aaj Hum Aa Gaili Maiya	Udit Narayan; Anupama Deshpande; Vinod Kumar
2	Chupchap Tu Dekhat Chal	Suresh Wadkar
3	Dadaji Banale Raja Ke Ghoda	Usha Mangeshkar; Shailendra Singh; Mahendra Kapoor
4	Dhan Dhan Bhag Lalnawa	Alka Yagnik; Udit Narayan; Asha Bhosle
5	Hamari Nathuniya Ke Nagawa	Asha Bhosle
6	Jab Hum Jaai Naiharwan	Asha Bhosle
7	Pardesiya Se Ladal Najariyan	Kavita Krishnamurthy
8	Sajanwa Bairi Bhaile Hamar	Alka Yagnik
9	Sunil Ye Shivji	Usha Mangeshkar
10	Ye Balma Pardesi	Alka Yagnik; Udit Narayan

== Release ==
Sajanwa Baire Bhaile Hamaar was released in India in 1987 as a Bhojpuri-language feature film. Scholarship on the industry places it in the “old Bhojpuri cinema” period (1960–1990). The film is associated with the revival that followed Dangal (1977), a phase often distinguished from the “new Bhojpuri cinema” that developed from the late 1990s.

== Reception ==
Accounts of Bhojpuri cinema indicate that films of the “old Bhojpuri cinema” period (1960s–1990s), including Sajanwa Baire Bhaile Hamaar, received little sustained critical attention in the mainstream press. According to Ratnakar Tripathy, Bhojpuri films “are as a matter of rule not reviewed in newspapers or websites except for promotional commentaries and insertions”, and there was “a near absence of textual analysis of Bhojpuri cinema either in the press or academic circles” at the time. Film historian Anjani Srivastava has likewise noted the limited critical documentation of Bhojpuri films from this era. In the absence of contemporary reviews and detailed production coverage, secondary sources discuss Sajanwa Baire Bhaile Hamaar chiefly in terms of its cast and crew and its position in broader histories of early Bhojpuri cinema.
