= Paan Khaye Saiyan Hamaar =

1984 Indian Bhojpuri-language film

- Directed by: Sujit Kumar
- Written by: Kiran Singh (story); Sujit Kumar (screenplay); Rahi Masoom Raza (dialogue)
- Screenplay by: Sujit Kumar
- Story by: Kiran Singh
- Starring: Sujit Kumar; Bandini Mishra
- Music by: Naushad
- Production company: Shiv Bhakti Films
- Release date: 1984
- Running time: 159 minutes
- Country: India
- Language: Bhojpuri

Paan Khaye Saiyan Paan Hamaar (Bhojpuri for My lover chews betel leaves) is a 1984 Bhojpuri language film directed by Sujit Kumar and produced under the banner of Shiv Bhakti Films. The film stars Sujit Kumar and Bandini Mishra in the lead roles, with S. N. Tripathi, Kumud Tripathi, Ranjeet, and Vinod Singh appearing in supporting parts. The screenplay was written by Sujit Kumar, with the story by Kiran Singh and dialogue by Rahi Masoom Raza. The film features a soundtrack composed by Naushad.

Paan Khaye Saiyan Paan Hamaar has been classified as a “modestly popular” film of the Bhojpuri cinema in the 1980s.

== Plot ==
In a rural setting, the narrative centers on Bhola, an upright and courageous man admired for his loyalty and his skill in stick fighting. Bhola works in the service of Thakur Harpal Singh, to whom he has long been devoted. He is also in love with Lali, a paan (betel leaf) vendor, and the two eventually marry and begin building a modest life together.

The story shifts dramatically when Bhola requests the payment of his long overdue wages—eleven years’ worth of unpaid dues. Instead of settling the amount, Thakur Harpal Singh humiliates him and makes a predatory demand: he insists that Bhola send Lali to him as a justification for the money owed. Outraged by this violation of trust and dignity, Bhola attacks the Thakur. Seizing the opportunity, the Thakur and his political advisor devise a scheme to have Bhola arrested on fabricated charges, intending to remove him permanently.

While in prison, Bhola receives news that Lali is pregnant and that he is soon to become a father. This revelation tempers his anger and strengthens his resolve to complete his sentence peacefully so he can return to his family. However, Thakur Harpal Singh continues his campaign of malice from afar, spreading rumors of an illicit relationship with Lali. These falsehoods deepen Bhola's suffering, testing both his endurance and his faith as he struggles to reclaim his life and protect his family's honor.

== Cast ==
- Sujit Kumar as Bhola
- Bandini Mishra as Lali
- S. N. Tripathi
- Kumud Tripathi
- Ranjeet as Thakur Harpal Singh
- Vinod Singh
- Hari Shukla
- Yunus Parvez
- Madhuri Mishra
- K. D. Singh
- Amitabh Bachchan as Nahar Singh in a special appearance
- Rekha as herself in a special appearance

== Production and background ==
Paan Khaye Saiyan Hamaar was the first film produced by Shiv Bhakti Films. The film’s prominence derives largely from the cast assembled by its producers. Kathryn Hardy’s research on Bhojpuri cinema shows that distributors consistently viewed star power—especially a well-known male lead—as central to a film’s commercial prospects, because major stars were believed to ensure strong openings and reduce financial risk. In that context, Rajmani Singh’s decision to cast Sujit Kumar as the male lead reflected the industry’s broader emphasis on star-driven films. Press sources describe Kumar as the first “superstar” of Bhojpuri cinema and one of the industry’s most accomplished actors.

Paan Khaye Saiyan Paan Hamaar marked several notable firsts in Bhojpuri cinema. The film introduced Sujit Kumar in his directorial debut. It also featured Bandini Mishra, previously known for supporting roles in Hindi language films, in her first leading role in a Bhojpuri production. The story was written by Kiran Singh, spouse of Sujit Kumar, who made her debut as a story writer with the film. It was also the first Bhojpuri film to feature major Hindi film stars Amitabh Bachchan and Rekha in special appearances, marking an unprecedented crossover from mainstream Bollywood. As in much of Indian cinema, Bhojpuri films place strong emphasis on song sequences, which significantly influence audience turnout and ancillary revenue. Continuing this sequence of firsts, the film's soundtrack was composed by Naushad—described as a “legendary” music composer and regarded as “one of India’s great music composers”—who made his Bhojpuri film debut with this production.

== Soundtrack ==
The film's soundtrack was composed by Naushad, with lyrics written by Ram Murti Chaturvedi.

No.	Title	Singer(s)
1	Dil Debe Na Hum	Asha Bhosle
2	Jaan Marat Ba Goriya	Asha Bhosle, Mahendra Kapoor
3	Jai Bajrang Bali	Manna Dey
4	Ham Ta Lut Gaili	Manna Dey
5	Sonvaan Dehiyan	Asha Bhosle

== Release ==
Paan Khaye Saiyan Hamaar was released in India in 1984 as a Bhojpuri language feature film during a period within the broader phase of the “old Bhojpuri cinema” (1960s to the 1990s). Its release is generally situated within the revival period that followed Dangal (1977), a period often contrasted with the “new Bhojpuri cinema” that emerged from the late 1990s onward.

== Reception ==
Accounts of Bhojpuri cinema indicate that films of the “old Bhojpuri cinema” period (1960s–1990s), including Paan Khaye Saiyan Hamaar, received little sustained critical attention in the mainstream press. According to film scholar Ratnakar Tripathy, Bhojpuri films “are as a matter of rule not reviewed in newspapers or websites except for promotional commentaries and insertions,” resulting in “a near absence of textual analysis of Bhojpuri cinema either in the press or academic circles” at the time. Film historians, including Anjani Srivastava, document very limited archival coverage of this era. In the absence of contemporary reviews, secondary sources discuss Paan Khaye Saiyan Hamaar chiefly in terms of its cast and crew and its position in broader histories of early Bhojpuri cinema.
