= Chanwa Ke Take Chakor =

1981 film directed by Nazir Hussain

Chanwa Ke Take Chakor is Bhojpuri film released in 1981 directed by Nazir Hussain.

== See also ==
- Bhojpuri Film Industry
- List of Bhojpuri films
