= Dharti Ki Aawaz =

1987 Indian Bhojpuri-language film

- Directed by: K. D. Singh
- Written by: K. D. Singh (story); K. D. Singh (screenplay); Vishwanath Pandey (dialogue)
- Produced by: Bhuvneshwar Jha; Jawaharlal Jha
- Starring: Sujit Kumar; Padma Khanna; Kunal Singh
- Cinematography: V. Shaukat
- Music by: Onkar
- Production company: Jawahar Picture Palace Productions
- Release date: 1987
- Running time: 176 minutes
- Country: India
- Language: Bhojpuri

Dharti Ki Aawaz (Bhojpuri for The Voice of the Earth) is a 1987 Bhojpuri social drama film directed by K. D. Singh. The film was produced by Bhuvneshwar Jha and Jawaharlal Jha under the banner of Jawahar Picture Palace Productions. The film stars Sujit Kumar, Padma Khanna, Kunal Singh in the lead roles with Manoj Verma, Bandini Mishra and Shweta appearing in supporting roles.

== Cast ==
- Sujit Kumar
- Padma Khanna
- Kunal Singh
- Manoj Verma
- Bandini Mishra
- Shweta

== Production and background ==
Dharti Ki Aawaz was produced by Bhuvneshwar Jha and Jawaharlal Jha shortly after the release of their film Ganga Ki Beti (1986), a box office success of the Bhojpuri cinema and a film that has been identified as a "significant milestone" in the regional industry's development. The producers brought back K. D. Singh—who had directed Ganga Ki Beti—to direct Dharti Ki Awaaz, and again hired Onkar, the earlier film's music composer, to score the soundtrack.

== Legacy ==
As observed by film scholar Ratnakar Tripathy, Bhojpuri films “are as a matter of rule not reviewed in newspapers or websites except for promotional commentaries and insertions”, and at the time there was in his words “a near absence of textual analysis of Bhojpuri cinema either in the press or academic circles”. In the absence of published reviews and detailed production reportage, the historical significance of Dharti Ki Awaaz is therefore discussed in secondary sources primarily with reference to its ensemble of cast and crew. Kathryn Hardy’s research on Bhojpuri cinema indicates that distributors consistently identify star power—especially that of a well-known male lead—as a primary determinant of a film’s commercial success, on the grounds that major stars are believed to secure strong openings and mitigate financial risk. The significance of Dhari Ki Awaaz can be understood within this framework, as its producers assembled an ensemble cast featuring two prominent male stars in leading roles: Sujit Kumar—widely regarded as the first superstar of Bhojpuri cinema and his co-lead, Kunal Singh had emerged as one of the industry’s most bankable stars following a succession of commercially successful films, culminating in his receipt of the Rashtra Kavi Dinkar Sammaan from Pranab Mukherjee, the President of India. Both worked together for the first time for director K. D. Singh after the commercial success of his film Ganga Ki Beti.

== Soundtrack ==
The film's soundtrack was composed by Onkar and lyrics written by Sameer.

No.	Title	Singers
1	Shaadi Shaadi Ratte Ratte Main To Dubli Ho	Shabbir Kumar, Kavita Krishnamurthy
2	Mujhko Rahne Do Parde Mein Rahne Do	Dilraj Kaur
3	Bahua Piyare Kaise Karun Tera	Usha Mangeshkar, Suresh Wadkar
4	Mera Ghar Parivaar Bata Sushiyon Ka Sansar	Suresh Wadkar
5	Dharti Ki Aawaaz Suno Kya Hai Smasya Aaj	Mahendra Kapoor
6	Chakua Marela Karejwa Mein Dard Nahin	Dilraj Kaur
7	Gayi Bambai Delhi Culcatta	Usha Mangeshkar
8	Aaisa Gul Gulshan Sansar	Suresh Wadkar
9	Palna Mein Khele Lalnare	Vinod Sehgal
10	He Hari Jhinjhari Naiya Mori Paar Karo	Suresh Wadkar
