= Manzilein Aur Bhi Hain =

1974 film

- Directed by: Mahesh Bhatt
- Written by: Rakesh Sharma; Satyadev Dubey (dialogue)
- Story by: Mahesh Bhatt
- Produced by: Rajendra Jain; Johnny Bakshi
- Starring: Kabir Bedi; Prema Narayan; Gulshan Arora
- Cinematography: Pravin Bhatt
- Edited by: Waman Bhosle; Gurudutt Shirali
- Music by: Bhupendra Soni; Yogesh (lyrics)
- Release date: 1974
- Country: India
- Language: Hindi

Manzilein Aur Bhi Hain (transl. Miles to Go Miles) is a 1974 Bollywood crime thriller film directed by Mahesh Bhatt, and starring Kabir Bedi, Prema Narayan and Gulshan Arora in lead roles. The rights of this film are now owned by Glamour Eyes Films.

The directorial debut film was about two fugitives and their relationship with a prostitute. The film was made in 1972, and was initially refused censor certificate and banned by the Censor Board of India for "mocking the sacred institution of marriage", and was thus held up for 14 months. However, after extended delays the Government stepped in, overruled the Board and passed the film, along with four other banned films. When it was finally released in 1974, it received neither critical or commercial success. It would take another decade and unsuccessful films in between but with the exception of Lahoo Ke Do Rang (1979) which was the first box office hit of Director Mahesh Bhatt, before his directed confessional cinema classic, Arth (1982) and later Saaransh (1984), which got him critical acclaim and were successful.

== Cast ==
- Kabir Bedi
- Mukesh Bhatt
- Prema Narayan
- Gulshan Arora
- Purnima
- Sudhir
- Mac Mohan
- Shah Durrani
- Viju Khote

== Production ==
Bhatt started his career assisting director, Raj Khosla. Thereafter in 1972, producer and a friend Johnny Bakshi offered Bhatt to direct a film, about two criminals and their relationship with a prostitute, which he agreed. Dialogues of the film were written by noted theatre director and playwright, Satyadev Dubey.

Music of the film was by Bhupendra Soni, with lyrics by Yogesh. The songs were performed by Asha Bhosle and Bhupinder.

== Songs ==
1. "Aaj Naye Geet Saje Meri Payal Me" - Asha Bhosle
2. "Har Ek Sans Hai Mehmaan" - Bhupinder Soni
3. "Manzile Aur Bhi Hai" - Bhupinder Soni
4. "Ae Dil Tu Jhoom Ke Chal" - Bhupinder Soni

== Remake ==
In 2012, Actress-turned-director Pooja Bhatt and daughter of Mahesh Bhatt, announced her inclination towards remaking her father's debut film, calling it "a bit too ahead of its time." She also talked about the financial hardships caused after the film. "he (Mahesh Bhatt) broke a table in frustration. I was very small that time. We didn`t have money and he walked back home from there (censor board office) to Shivaji Park. It was the dead end in his life."

== Bibliography ==
- Narwekar, Sanjit (1994). Directory of Indian film-makers and films. Flicks Books. ISBN 9780948911408.
- Gulazar; Nihalani, Govind; Chatterjee, Saibal (2003). Encyclopaedia of Hindi Cinema. Popular Prakashan. ISBN 978-81-7991-066-5.
- Ganti, Tejaswini (2004). Bollywood: A Guidebook to Popular Hindi Cinema. Psychology Press. ISBN 978-0-415-28854-5.
- Somaaya, Bhawana; Kothari, Jigna; Madangarli, Supriya (2013). Mother Maiden Mistress. HarperCollins Publishers. ISBN 978-93-5029-485-7.
- "Wanted: a realistic censor policy". Organiser. Bharat Prakashan. 30 March 1974.
