= Maa Bahen Aur Biwi =

Maa Bahen Aur Biwi (1974 film)
- Directed by: Mickey Nivelli
- Music by: Sharda
- Release date: 1974
- Country: India
- Language: Hindi

Maa Bahen Aur Biwi is a 1974 Bollywood drama film directed by Harbans Kumar.

== Cast ==
- Kabir Bedi
- Prema Narayan
- Raj Kishore
- David Abraham
- Anjana
- Jankidas
- Tabassum
- Tun Tun

== Soundtrack ==
The music of the film was composed by Sharda, while lyrics were written by Vedpal Sharma and Qamar Jalalabadi.

1. "Raghupati Raghav" – Kishore Kumar
