= Piya Ke Gaon =

1985 Bhojpuri film

- Directed by: Dilip Bose
- Written by: Dilip Bose (story)
- Screenplay by: Dilip Bose
- Produced by: Muktinarayan Pathak
- Starring: Meera Madhuri, Danisha
- Music by: Chitragupt
- Production company: Meenkshri Productions
- Release date: 1985
- Country: India
- Language: Bhojpuri

Piya Ke Gaon (English: Lover's Village) is a Bhojpuri film, based on a story by Dilip Bose and directed by him as well. The film was released on 5 June 1985. It had music by Chitragupt and songs by Alka Yagnik, Suresh Wadkar and Chandrani Mukherjee. Dilip Bose was the screen play writer of this film. The film was made under the banner of Minakashri Productions.

== Plot ==
This film shows the tragedy of a dowry system.

== Cast ==
- Meera Madhuri
- Danisha
- Aruna Irani
- Jayshree T.

== Music ==
No.	Title	Singer(s)	Length
1.	"Ae Doctor Babu Batain"	Shabbir Kumar, Alka Yagnik	5:19
2.	"Aankh Mein Suratiya"	Chandrani Mukherjee	3:12
3.	"Hammar Piyawa"	Asha Bhosle	2:57
4.	"He Tripurari He"	Usha Mangeshkar	3:21
5.	"Jug Jug Jiyasu Lalanwa"	Alka Yagnik	3:16
6.	"Aankh Se Aankh Milke"	Suresh Wadkar, Alka Yagnik	3:13
7.	"Pahile Pahile"	Usha Mangeshkar, Dilraj Kaur	6:00
8.	"Ghir Aail Kariya Badariya"	Alka Yagnik
9.	"Kanhwa Ke Tilak"	Chandrani Mukherjee
10.	"Chodi Ke Chalailu"	Chandrani Mukherjee
