= Arrah Hile Chhapra Hile Baliya Hilela =

Popular Bhojpuri folk song

Song
- Language: Bhojpuri
- Genre: Folk

"Arrah Hile Chhapra Hile Baliya Hilela" is a Bhojpuri folk song, It gained popularity in 1977 when it was recreated in the first colored Bhojpuri movie Dangal. The song was sung by Manna Dey and written by Kulwant Jani. This song became very famous and has been recreated many times by Bollywood and Bhojpuri Cinema

== Versions ==
=== 1977 film version ===
This song was recreated by the lyricist Rajpati for the Bhojpuri film Dangal.

=== 1996 film version ===
This song was recreated in Bollywood movie Angaara starring Mithun Chakraborty and the singers were Udit Narayan and Alka Yagnik.

=== 1996 film version ===
This song was recreated by lyricist Yogesh and composer Aadesh Shrivastava for Bollywood film Apne Dam Par. The singer was Govinda.

=== 2012 film remake ===
Indu Sonali from the album Khoon Pasina

=== 2019 film version ===
The song was recreated for the Bollywood film Jabariya Jodi starting Sidharth Malhotra and Parineeti Chopra.

=== 2020 remix ===
The song is recreated as independent album by Ritesh Pandey.

This song was also recreated in the Bhojpuri film "Bitiya Sada Suhagan Raha" starring Rani Chatterjee kritn ajitesh and sung by Kalpana Patowary in an album. The song get it most of popularity in its remix version. Bhojpuri song are now becoming a sign of nudity, abusing etc.so it became unfit for listening in public places or with family.(By-Gaurav Kumar)
