= Ganga (1965 film) =

1965 Indian Bhojpuri-language film

- Directed by: Kundan Kumar
- Starring: Kumkum; Sujit Kumar
- Music by: Chitragupt
- Production company: Kumkum's Home Production Company
- Release date: 1965
- Country: India
- Language: Bhojpuri

Ganga is a 1965 Bhojpuri film directed by Kundan Kumar and produced under actress Kumkum’s home production banner. The film stars Kumkum and Sujit Kumar in the lead roles, with Anwar Hussain, Nana Palshikar, and Leela Mishra in supporting performances. With music composed by Chitragupt, Ganga is one of the early Bhojpuri films that helped popularize the language’s cinema during its formative decade.

== Plot ==
The film follows a simple village girl who shows remarkable strength and courage as she steps out into the wider world to support her family. Despite limited means and deep rooted social constraints, she refuses to be defeated by hardship and prejudice. As she confronts new challenges beyond her village, her determination gradually transforms her from a sheltered daughter into the main pillar of her household.

== Cast ==
- Kumkum as the protagonist, a young woman determined to support her family
- Sujit Kumar as her love interest
- Anwar Hussain
- Nana Palshikar
- Leela Mishra

== Soundtrack ==
The film's music was composed by Chitragupt, with lyrics by Shailendra.

Title	Singers
"Kanha Tori Bansi Ke Julmi Re Taan"	Lata Mangeshkar
"Magan Kahe Nache Tor Man Gori"	Usha Mangeshkar, Lata Mangeshkar

== Bibliography ==
- Ghosh, Avijit (2010). Cinema Bhojpuri. Penguin Books. ISBN 978-0-14-310378-3.
