= In Search of Bidesia =

2019 musical documentary

In Search of Bidesia is a 2019 musical documentary film directed by Mumbai-based filmmaker Simit Bhagat. The film is about the culture and history of the Bhojpuri folk tradition known as "Bidesia" music, connecting it to the history of indentured labourers in the Bhojpuri region.

== Production ==
Bhagat's inspiration for the film emerged from a visit to a Bhojpuri-speaking village in Uttar Pradesh, where he encountered a community of musicians deeply entrenched in folk traditions.

The production of In Search of Bidesia involved Bhagat's two-week motorcycle journey in 2017 across the Uttar Pradesh-Bihar region, where he met with local artists, recorded their songs, and documented their stories. Many of the recordings were spontaneous and took place in natural settings such as temples, fields, and riversides. Bhagat also visited the National Archives in London to research the history of indentured labour, source original photos and meet the descendants of these workers.

The documentary resulted in the establishment of Simit Bhagat's larger initiative, The Bidesia Project, which aims to document folk music and marginalised voices in northern India.

== Plot ==
The documentary centres on the concept of the "Bidesia", which is an affectionate term for someone who migrates to a distant place, often for economic reasons. Migration has long been a defining feature of the social and economic fabric of the Bhojpuri-speaking region. Especially during the colonial era when large numbers of indentured labourers from Bihar and Uttar Pradesh were sent to British colonies such as the Caribbean, Fiji, and Mauritius.

Bhagat begins his journey in Uttar Pradesh, where he meets Kailash Mishra, a Bhojpuri folk singer. The narrative continues with interviews and performances by other folk artists such as Saraswati Devi and Gopal Maurya, who share their experiences of migration through their music. These songs highlight themes of separation, longing, and the hardships faced by migrant labourers and their families. This folk tradition is survived by folk musicians like Kailash Mishra, Gopal Maurya, Saraswati Devi and Ajay Mishra. At 92 years old, Saraswati Devi, sings Jatsaar songs, typically sung by women during grain grinding

The film also traces the legacy of Mahendra Mishra, a folk musician from rural Bihar who, as mentioned in the Al Jazeera, contributed to India's fight for independence by printing fake currency to fund revolutionaries.

== The Bidesia Project ==
The Bidesia Project, led by Simit Bhagat, is an initiative for preserving and promoting Bhojpuri folk music. The project seeks to provide visibility to folk artists. As part of the initiative, The Bidesia Project produces music videos and showcases the work of Bhojpuri folk musicians.

== Reception ==
The documentary holds a rating of 7.5 out of 10 on MUBI, based on 127 reviews. According to Firstpost, "In Search of Bidesia" is "a poignant narrative of longing, pain, and separation." The film was lauded as "the most outstanding film about music/sound in the world" at the RAI Film Festival in the UK in 2021, as noted by The Hindu.

The film was screened at various film festivals in India and abroad. A 10-minute excerpt was showcased at the panel discussion Lest We Forget: Descendants of Indenture at the Bangalore Literature Festival in 2018, which focused on the journey of indentured labourers, their descendants, and the challenge of lost identities and histories. The musical documentary was also screened at the 18th Dhaka International Film Festival in 2020.

The documentary is notable for its efforts to preserve Bhojpuri folk traditions, particularly at a time when these traditions face the threat of fading away. According to an article in Thomson Reuters, In Search of Bidesia offers a "poignant commentary on the resilience of marginalised communities and the enduring power of music as a form of resistance and identity."

A review on Ethnomusicology Forum praised the film, saying "what makes the documentary stand out is the unique way it interweaves ethnography, memories and experience to create a scenario. The director allows the subjects and actors to speak without providing them with specific orientations or directions, which gives the impression of the director simply travelling through the landscape."

According to The Migration Story, "These traditional genres have been integral to the cultural fabric of the wider Bhojpuri-speaking region. We need to safeguard this legacy and ensure that it continues to enrich future generations with its unique stories and melodies."

== Recognition ==
- Best Music Documentary Award, Royal Anthropological Institute Film Festival, UK, 2021
- Official Selection at the 18th Dhaka International Film Festival, 2020
- Official Selection at the Nepal Human Rights International Film Festival, 2020
