= Kaisan Banaul Sansar =

1989 Indian Bhojpuri-language film

- Directed by: Dr. Gurdeep
- Written by: Dr. Gurdeep
- Screenplay by: Dr. Gurdeep
- Story by: Dr. Gurdeep
- Produced by: Dr. Gurdeep
- Starring: Sujit Kumar; Shraddha Verma
- Cinematography: Arvind Bhagdi
- Music by: Vijay–Ajit
- Production company: Harihar Pictures
- Release date: 1989
- Running time: 161 minutes
- Country: India
- Language: Bhojpuri

Kaisan Banaul Sansar (Bhojpuri for What kind of a world have you made) is a 1989 Bhojpuri language social drama film produced and directed by Dr. Gurdeep under the Harihar Pictures banner. The film stars Sujit Kumar and Shraddha Verma in the lead roles, with Ramsingh, Chandrakala, Leela Mishra, and Yunus Parvez appearing in key supporting roles. The screenplay, story, and dialogue were also handled by Dr. Gurdeep, while the music was composed by Vijay–Ajit.

The film marked the Bhojpuri cinema debut of writer-director-producer Dr. Gurdeep. Previously, Dr. Gurdeep had written the dialog of several Hindi films including Apradhi Kaun? (1982), Jaan-e-Bahaar (1979), Purana Mandir (1984) and Hanste Khelte 1984). A notable feature of the film was Sujit Kumar, the film’s lead male star, who is regarded as the “first superstar” of Bhojpuri films, and is widely recognized for his significant contributions to Bhojpuri cinema.

== Cast ==
- Sujit Kumar
- Shraddha Verma
- Ramsingh
- Chandrakala
- Yunus Parvez
- Leela Mishra
- Praveen Sood
- Vijay Verma
- Shabnam
- Dr. Gurdeep
- Kamaluddin
- Ashok Bhatia
- Manoj Agrawal
- Vinod Nigam
- Sunil Naik
- Premsukh Agrawal
- Soni Ahmad
- Naseem
- Madan
- Master Rinku

== Soundtrack ==
The soundtrack of Kaisan Banaul Sansar was composed by Vijay–Ajit, with lyrics penned by Dr. Gurdeep.

No.	Song	Singers
1	Lagi Gayile Mohar Sarkaari	Udit Narayan, Shobha Joshi
2	Sabere Bahe Pachhua	Udit Narayan, Shobha Joshi
3	Ram Ji Gopal Ji	Udit Narayan, Mukesh Shivram
4	Hum Ta Padi Gayili	Vijaya Rani
5	Meri Ladikaai Ka Posal Sugni	Ajit Kumar
6	Doli Chadhi Bhaili Bahini	Mahendra Kapoor
7	Tani Dheere Na Chal	Shobha Joshi
8	Kehu Se Chhodul Okar	Mahendra Kapoor
