= List of Bhojpuri films of 2024 =

This is a list of Bhojpuri films produced in Bhojpuri cinema in India, that were released in 2024.

== Films ==
Opening	Title	Director	Cast	Production company	Ref.
29 March 2024	Jaan Lebu Ka	Dinkar Kapoor	Dinesh Lal Yadav, Akshara Singh	Shrey Shrivastav	
29 March 2024	Mahadev Ka Gorakhpur	Rajesh Nair	Ravi Kishan, Pramod Pathak, Lal	Ravi Kishan Productions, Vaya Films	
17 May 2024	Dil Lagal Dupatta Wali Se 2	Sujeet Verma	Yash Kumarr, Shivika Diwan, Kiran Yadav	Giriraj Production, BFM Media Pvt. Ltd.	
7 June 2024	Rang De Basanti	Premanshu Singh	Khesari Lal Yadav, Rati Pandey, Diana Khan	SRK Music Pvt. Ltd.	
30 August 2024	Sooryavansham	Rajneesh Mishra	Pawan Singh, Shalu Singh, Chandani Singh, Maya Yadav	Yashi Films, Renu Vijay Films Entertainment	
