= Ayeel Basant Bahar =

1965 Indian Bhojpuri-language film

- Directed by: Devendra
- Story by: Rammoorti Chaturvedi
- Produced by: Shakti Samanta
- Starring: Naaz; Sujit Kumar; Jeevan; Chandrashekhar
- Music by: Hemant Kumar
- Production company: Shakti Films
- Release date: 1965
- Running time: 105 minutes
- Country: India
- Language: Bhojpuri

Ayeel Basant Bahar (Bhojpuri for Spring has come) is a 1965 Indian Bhojpuri language romantic drama film directed by Devendra. The film was produced by Shakti Samanta under the banner of Shakti Films with the story and dialog provided by Rammoorti Chaturvedi. The film stars Naaz and Sujit Kumar in lead roles with supporting roles from Jeevan and Chandrashekhar and music composed by Hemant Kumar. Centered on themes of rural hardship, debt, and resilience, the story follows a young villager, Chander, as he deals with the inequities of the caste system and confronts an oppressive landlord while striving to rebuild his life. The film is among the early Bhojpuri productions of the 1960s and is a part of the first phase of Bhojpuri cinema.

According to the Benares-based weekly film newspaper Rambha, the film was a major commercial success—despite producer Shakti Samant's disagreement—even though Hemant Kumar's music was regarded as disappointing. Supporting actor Chandrashekhar's performance drew much acclaim, but it was writer Rammoorti Chaturvedi who received the highest praise. Rambha credited the film's popularity to Chaturvedi's story, dialogues, and lyrics, remarking, “At every step, you can taste the flavor of Bhojpuri and hear its heartbeat.”

== Plot ==
Chander is a kind-hearted villager struggling under the weight of the debt left by his late father. His hardships are compounded by the entrenched inequities of the caste system, which shape his social standing and limit his ability to challenge exploitation. Taking advantage of this imbalance, a ruthless landlord schemes to ruin him and recover the money by any means necessary.

Amid these pressures, Chander harbours a quiet love for Kamla, the sister of his closest friend, Birju. Their relationship, already constrained by social expectations, becomes even more fraught when the landlord exposes Chander's feelings, creating a rift between the two friends. As tensions escalate, Chander and Kamla must navigate the conflict between family loyalty, caste-bound obligations, and personal desire.

== Cast ==
- Sujit Kumar as Chander
- Naaz as Kamla
- Chandrashekhar as Birju
- Jeevan as the landlord

== Soundtrack ==
The music of the Bhojpuri film Ayel Basant Bahar (1963) was composed by Hemant Kumar with lyrics by Rammoorti Chaturvedi.

No.	Title	Singer(s)
1	"Kaga Re Udi Ja Re"	Asha Bhosle, Amarnath Chaturvedi
2	"Maiya Thumak Thumak"	Manna Dey
3	"Phoolwa Ke Jhulwa"	Manna Dey
4	"Ab To Chala Sambhal Ke Chacha"	Manna Dey, Mahendra Kapoor
5	"Bhauji Jaise Bhaiya Mane"	Geeta Dutt
6	"Tohre Naina Me Khoi Gaile"	Geeta Dutt, Manna Dey

== Reception ==
The film was described as "a tragic social drama about the inequities of the caste system". Chandrashekhar received praised for his performance in the film.
