= Piya Rakhiah Senurwa Ke Laaj =

Piya Rakhiya Senurwa Ke Laaj
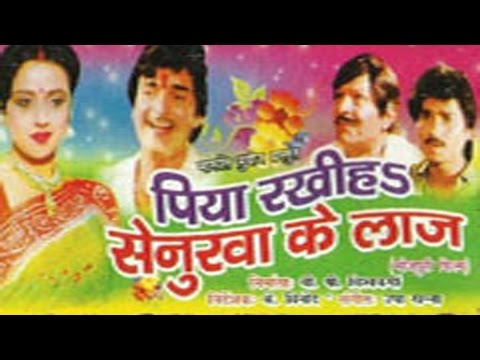
- Film poster
- Directed by: K. Vinod
- Screenplay by: Anil Deepak
- Story by: K.Vinod
- Produced by: V.P Vishwakarma; R.N Vishwakarma; Rajni Ranjan
- Starring: Kunal; Meera Madhuri; Bandini Mishra; Rahul Vishwakarma; Hari Shukla; Ramchandra Vishwakarma; Madhu Mishra; Raju Ranjan Prasad
- Cinematography: S.K. Sharma
- Edited by: Harendra Singh
- Music by: Usha Khanna
- Production company: Vishwakarma Entertainment Pvt. Ltd.
- Release date: 12 June 1987
- Running time: 149 min.
- Country: India
- Language: Bhojpuri

Piya Rakhiya Senurwa Ke Laaj is a 1987 Bhojpuri film, directed by K. Vinod and produced by V.P Vishwakarma, starring Kunal, Bandini Mishra, Rahul Vishwakarma, Surinder Shinda, Preeti Sapru, with a special appearance by Sanjay Vishwakarma. The film was one of the highest grossing Bhojpuri films during the initial release, and won numerous awards and accolades from the public as well as critics. Piya Rakhiah Senurwa Ke Laaj emerged as the highest grossing Bhojpuri film during that period of time and is hence regarded as a cult classic "Super-Hit" Bhojpuri film.

== Plot ==
After completing medical studies, Vijay returns to his village and plans to set up a hospital for the poor. He meets his childhood sweetheart Basanti but her life has taken a turn for the worse. Basanti is a widow living a hard life along with her young brother. Vijay and Basanti both harbor feelings for each other but are afraid to speak about it. Basanti constantly comes under the attack of the village doctor who tries to take advantage of her. The local doctor plays vicious games to ruin Vijay and his brother Ajay, who is in love with his daughter Radha. Vijay sets out to triumph in his love but can he fight a prejudiced society plagued by illiteracy?

== Music ==
Usha Khanna composed the music for playback of Kartar Ramla, Manpreet Akhtar, Surinder Shinda, Sardool Sikander, Nirmal Sidhu and more. Baljinder Sangila penned the lyrics.

Track list

- Piya Rakhiya Senurwa Ke Laaj
- Muzzarfarpur Ke Lichiya

== Cast ==
- Kunal as "Vijay"
- Rahul Vishwakarma as "Ajay"
- Meera Madhuri as "Basanti"
- Bandini Mishra as "Bindiya"
- Sanjay Vishwakarma (special appearance)
