= Mai Ka Lal (film) =

1979 Indian Bhojpuri-language film

- Directed by: Rajpati Rahi
- Produced by: G. L. Chadha
- Starring: Sujit Kumar; Prema Narayan; Chand Usmani; Ram Singh
- Music by: Nadeem–Shravan
- Release date: 1979
- Country: India
- Language: Bhojpuri

Mai Ka Lal (Bhojpuri for Apple of mom’s eye) is a 1979 Indian Bhojpuri language masala film directed by Rajpati Rahi. The film was produced by G. L. Chadha and starred Sujit Kumar and Prema Narayan in lead roles, with Chand Usmani, Ram Singh, Hari Shukla, Jayshree T., and Yunus Parvez in supporting roles. Featuring music composed by Nadeem–Shravan with lyrics by Rajpati Rahi, Mai Ka Lal follows the struggles and eventual triumph of a young man facing hardship and injustice.

A defining aspect of Mai Ka Lal was its ensemble cast and creative team. The filmmakers not only brought Rajpati Rahi—fresh off the success of writing the film Dangal (1977) to direct Mai Ka Lal —but also reunited several key members of Dangal’s team to replicate its winning formula. As in Dangal, Sujit Kumar took on the leading male role in Mai Ka Lal, while Prema Narayan, known for her work in Dangal, reprised her position as the leading actress. The film’s music, too, came from the same composer, Nadeem–Shravan, who had crafted the soundtrack for Dangal.

Equally notable, Mai Ka Lal was distributed beyond the usual Bhojpuri strongholds of Bihar and eastern Uttar Pradesh, reaching central and western Uttar Pradesh and Delhi. The film reportedly cost about ₹8 lakhs and earned approximately ₹25 lakhs in Delhi and Uttar Pradesh. Film scholars have described Mai Ka Lal as a significant box-office success.

== Plot ==
Mai Ka Lal follows the story of a young man who rises from a life of hardship to become a symbol of justice and resilience in his rural community. Guided by his deep bond with his mother, whose strength and moral integrity shape his character, he confronts the social inequalities and personal conflicts that define his surroundings.

The narrative combines elements of family drama, action, and emotional intensity, portraying the protagonist’s journey from obscurity to local heroism. The film includes traditional “masala” components—such as energetic dance sequences and wrestling matches—which underscore the central themes of endurance, courage, and triumph over adversity.

== Cast ==
- Sujit Kumar as the protagonist, a young man who rises from hardship to become a symbol of justice and resilience
- Prema Narayan as his love interest
- Chand Usmani as the protagonist’s mother, whose strength and guidance shape his character
- Ram Singh
- Hari Shukla
- Jayshree T.
- Yunus Parvez

== Soundtrack ==
The music was composed by Nadeem–Shravan, with all lyrics written by Rajpati Rahi.

No.	Song	Singers
1	"Hamre Hatwa"	Mahendra Kapoor
2	"Chadhal Jawani"	Asha Bhosle
3	"Hamka Lai Chal"	Asha Bhosle, Mahendra Kapoor
4	"Aaj Mahafil Mei"	Asha Bhosle, Mahendra Kapoor
5	"Upar Baithal Ek"	Mahendra Kapoor

== Bibliography ==
- Ghosh, Avijit (2010). Cinema Bhojpuri. Penguin Books. ISBN 978-0-14-310378-3.
