= Sonalika Prasad =

Indian Actress

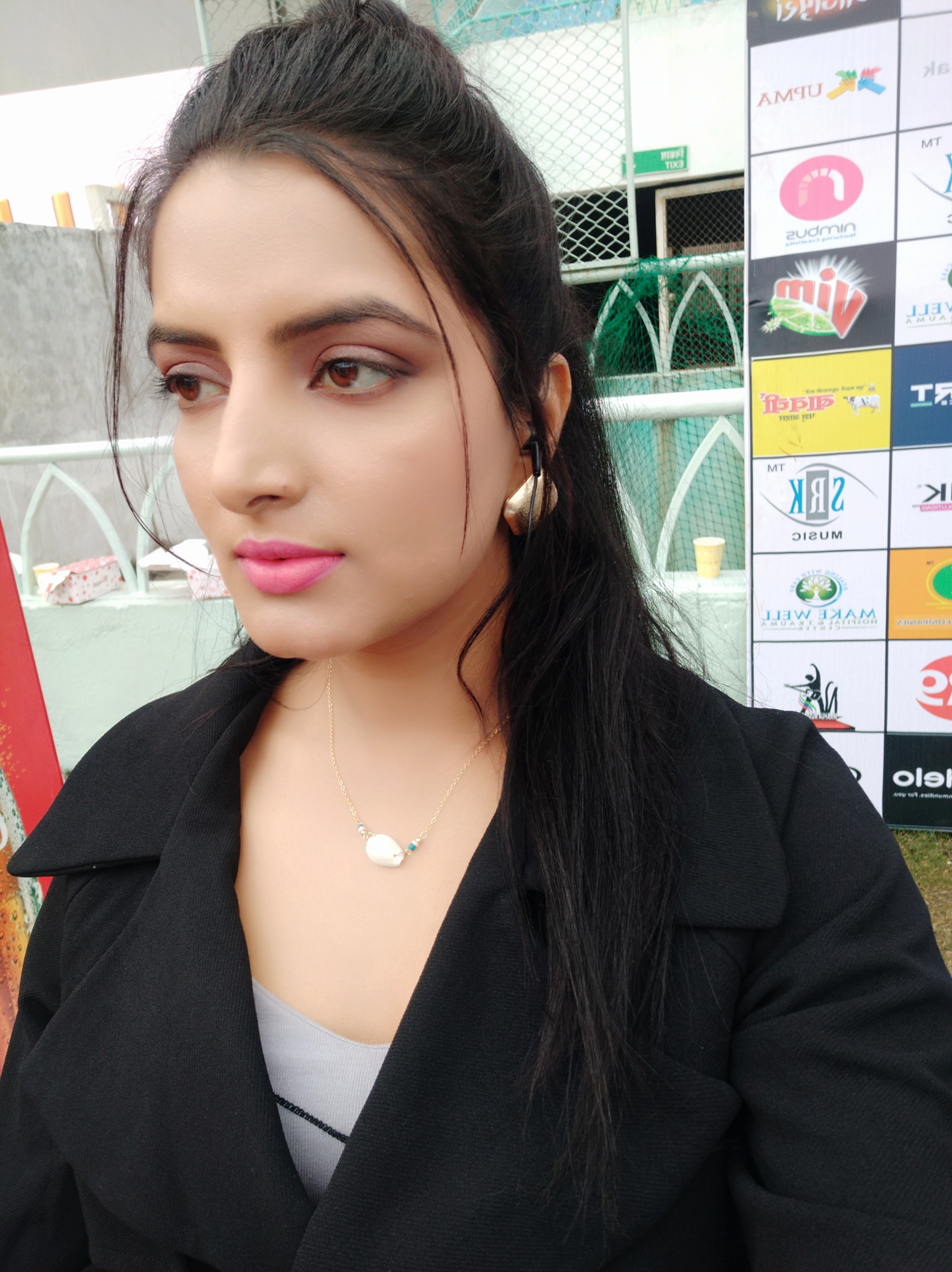
- Born: 5 October 1992 (age 34); Patna, Bihar, India
- Occupations: Actor, model and presenter
- Years active: 2015–present
- Known for: Bhojpuri cinema
- Notable work: Raajtilak; Laila Majnu
- Awards: Best debutant female lead actress for Raajtilak

Sonalika Prasad (born 5 October 1992) is an Indian actress who predominantly works in Bhojpuri and Hindi language films and television. She is a well-known personality for hosting events. She is known for her roles in the television shows CID, Savdhaan India and Crime Patrol and films like Raajtilak and Laila Majnu.

== Early life ==
Prasad was born on 5 October 1992 in Patna, Bihar, where she was brought up. She did her schooling in St. Karen's school (from 1st - 6th standard) and Krishna Niketan school (from 7th - 10th) in Patna. She did her high school, graduation (Bachelor of Arts (Hons) in political science) and post-graduation in mass communication from Patna Women's College. She was always interested in learning languages and now she speaks Hindi, English and Bhojpuri.

Prasad has said, "My family always wanted me to study till my post graduation, but I always had interest in fine arts. Still I did mass communication but I used to do stuff related to vocal singing and Kathak dance. I took 6 year training in vocal singing and Kathak dance and all apart from my studies. I used to do plays, horse riding, bike and car driving. I did modeling during college days. Sometimes I bunked my colleges lectures for my singing and Kathak training."

== Career ==
Prasad made her television debut in the 2015 television show CID and her film debut in the 2019 film Raajtilak. In 2017, she did many commercial and print advertising shoots.

In 2020, she worked on Bhojpuri Industry Premier League (BIPL) seasom 4 Live presenting for Dhishoom Channel. She hosted, played games and danced in Roj Hoi Bhoj as a celebrity participant, danced in Diwali Carnival and Chhat Pooja for the Big Ganga television channel. She performed a dance in the Holi show for B4U Bhojpuri.

In 2021, she acted in and hosted Hansi ki rail chut na jaaye, acomedy show. She was the lead actor in the web series Luv Guru. She recorded an audio music album, Zindagi Jhand baa, Phir bhi ghamand baa, a rap song, sung by herself and Raju Singh Mahi. It was released by a Bhojpuri music company.

== Television ==
Year	Name	Role	Channel
2015	CID (TV series)		Sony TV
2015-17	Savdhaan India		Star Bharat
2016	Har Mushkil Ka Hal Akbar Birbal		Big Ganga
2016	Crime Patrol (TV series)		Sony TV
2017	Mahakali — Anth Hi Aarambh Hai		Colors TV
2017	Baatein Kuch Ankahee Si	Megha	DD National

== Filmography ==
Key
†	Denotes films that have not yet been released

Year	Film	Role	Language
2019	Raajtilak	Pooja	Bhojpuri
2019	Kalakar	Rani	Bhojpuri
2019	Sadak	Vandana	Bhojpuri
2019	Dhaniya	Manju	Bhojpuri
2020	Laila Majnu	Shama	Bhojpuri
2021	Gumrah †	TBA	Bhojpuri
2021	Bade Miya Chhote Miya †	TBA	Bhojpuri
2021	Jiya Bekrar Ba†	TBA	Bhojpuri
2021	Kallu ki Dulhaniya†	TBA	Bhojpuri
2021	1 Chhaila 6 Laila†	TBA	Bhojpuri
2021	Banarsi Babu†	TBA	Bhojpuri
2021	Robinhood Pandey†	TBA	Bhojpuri
2021	Shikari†	TBA	Bhojpuri
2021	Om Jai Jagdish†	TBA	Bhojpuri
2026	Kawan Kasoor	Sanjana	Bhojpuri

=== Music videos ===
- Zindagi Jhand Ba Phir Bhi Ghamand Ba

== Webseries ==
Year	Name	Role	Channel	Notes
2021	Luv Guru		WOW	Akshay Sethi and Sonalika Prasad in main lead role

== Awards and nominations ==
Year	Ceremony	Category	Film	Result
2020	Green Cine Awards show	Best Debutant Female Lead Actress	Raajtilak	Won
