= Kunal Singh (actor, born 1955) =

Indian film actor (born 1955)

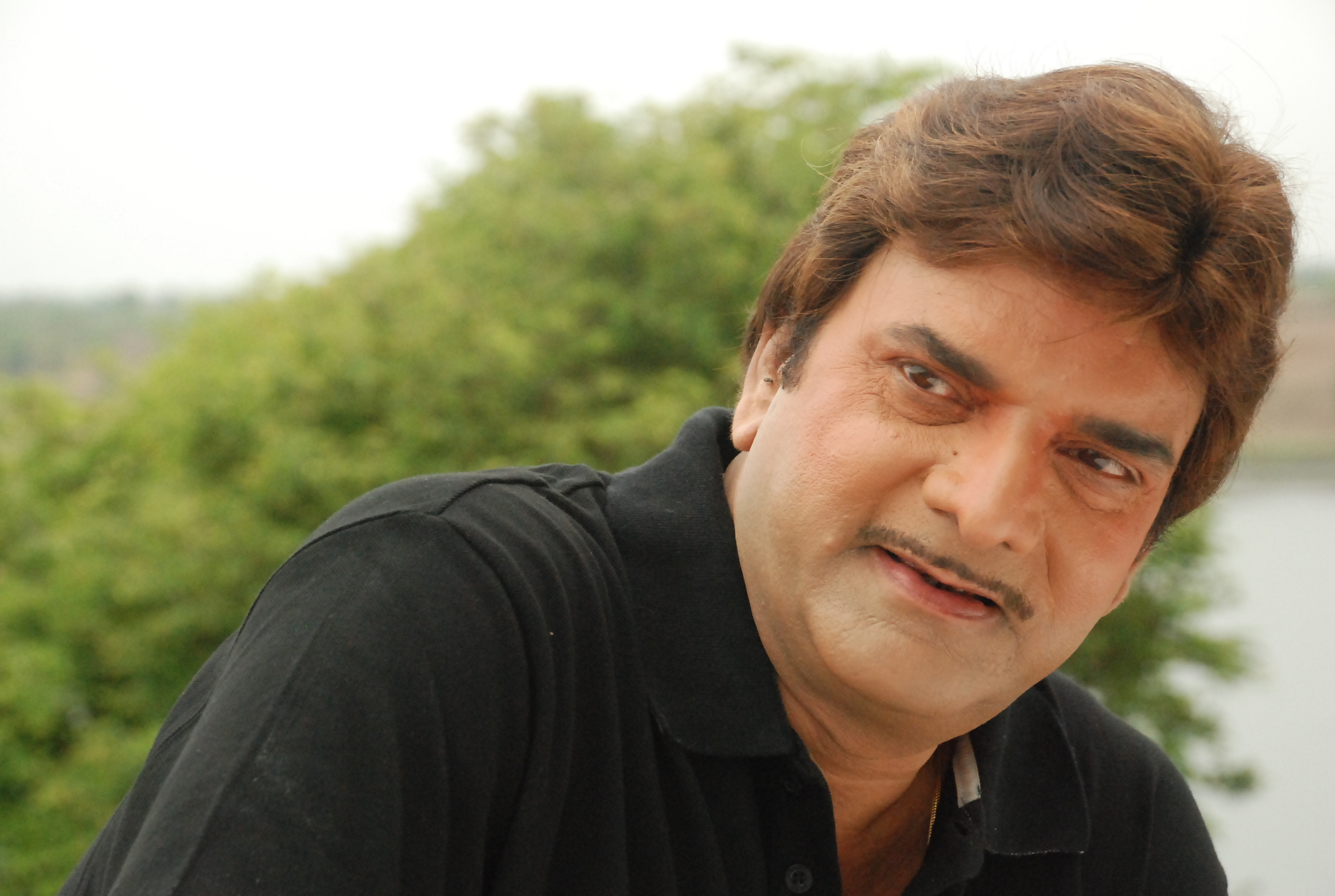
- Kunal Singh
- Born: Kunal Singh Yadav; 1955 (age 70–71)
- Occupations: Actor; producer
- Years active: 1979–present
- Spouse: Arati Bhattacharya
- Children: Akash Singh
- Father: Buddhadev Singh
- Honours: Rashtrakavi Dinkar Award (2012)

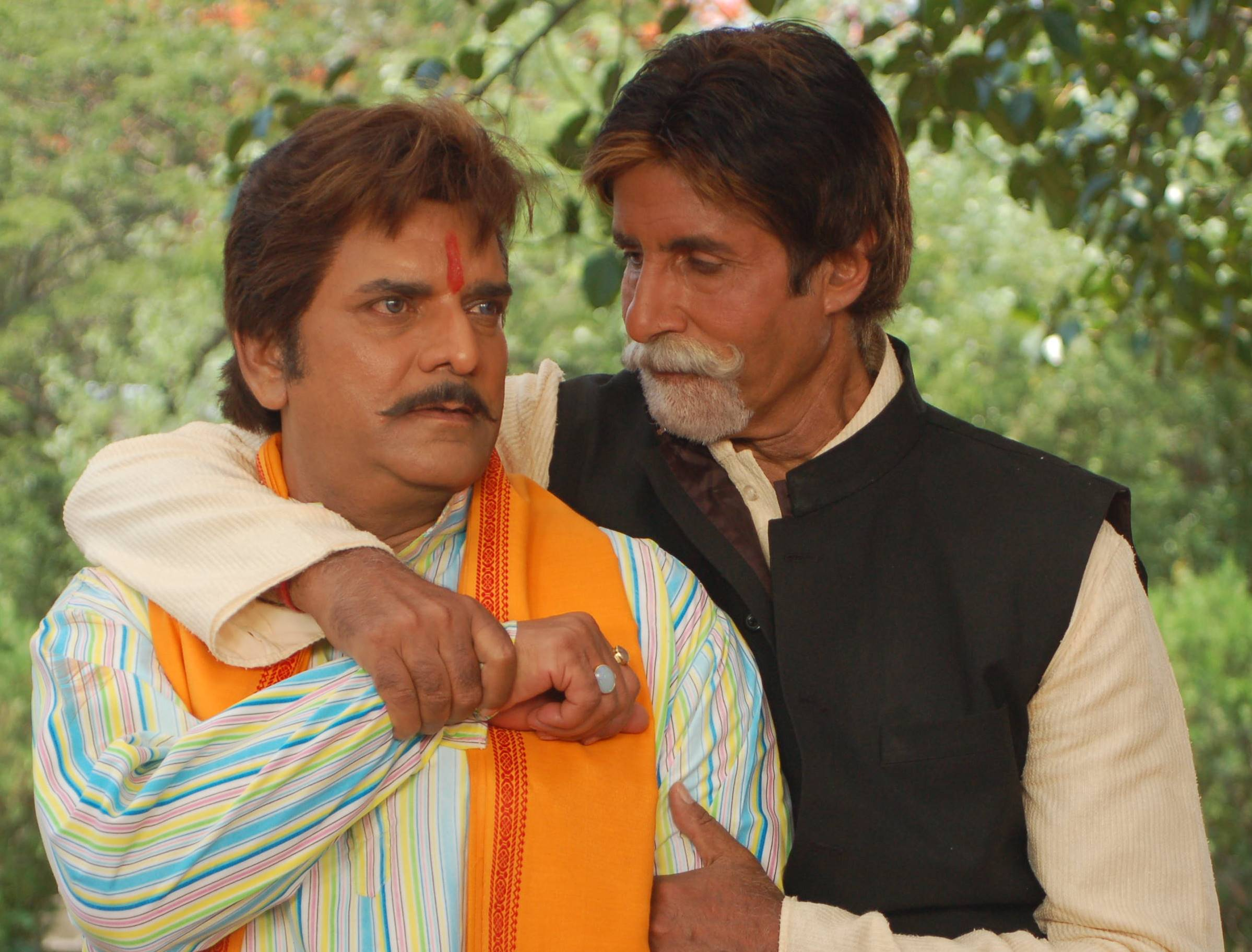
With Amitabh Bachchan

Kunal Singh Yadav is an Indian actor associated with Bhojpuri cinema. Also referred to as Amitabh Bachchan of Bhojpuri Cinema because of his dominance on Bhojpuri cinema and also as Jitendra of Bhojpuri cinema because of his remarkable resemblance with the bollywood actor Jitendra, Kunal, in his four-decade long career, has acted in more than 250 movies. For his contributions to cinema, he was awarded the Rashtrakavi Dinkar Award in 2012 by Pranab Mukherjee.

== Life ==
Kunal was born in a 1955 in a Yadav family. His father Buddhadev Singh was a senior Congress leader. He has remarkable resemblance with the bollywood actor Jeetendra. In his childhood he was asked to read out from the script of a play named Jantantra Zindabad, for his bad performance in the audition the director complemented that "acting is not his cup of tea". After this incident he decided to become an actor. He is married to Bengali actress Arati Bhattacharya.

== Acting career ==
He made his acting debut with the Hindi film Kal Hamara Hai (1980) directed by Girish Ranjan. He played the role of a Tonga Drive in that film. It did a good business in the theatres of Uttar Pradesh and Bihar. After this film he started getting many offers for Bhojpuri films. His first major success in Bhojpuri was Dharti Maiyaa (1981), in which he played the role of a wayward youth. His biggest hit Ganga Kinare Mora Gaon was released 1983. In a theatre of Varanasi it ran for 16 months. His Ram Jaisan Bhaiyaa Hamar ran for 50 days in Kishanganj and broke the record held by Ram Teri Ganga Maili In 2007, he acted with Amitabh Bachchan and Mithun Chakraborty in the Bhojpuri film Gangotri. His first film in 2022 was Aashiqui starring Khesari Lal Yadav and Amrapali Dubey.

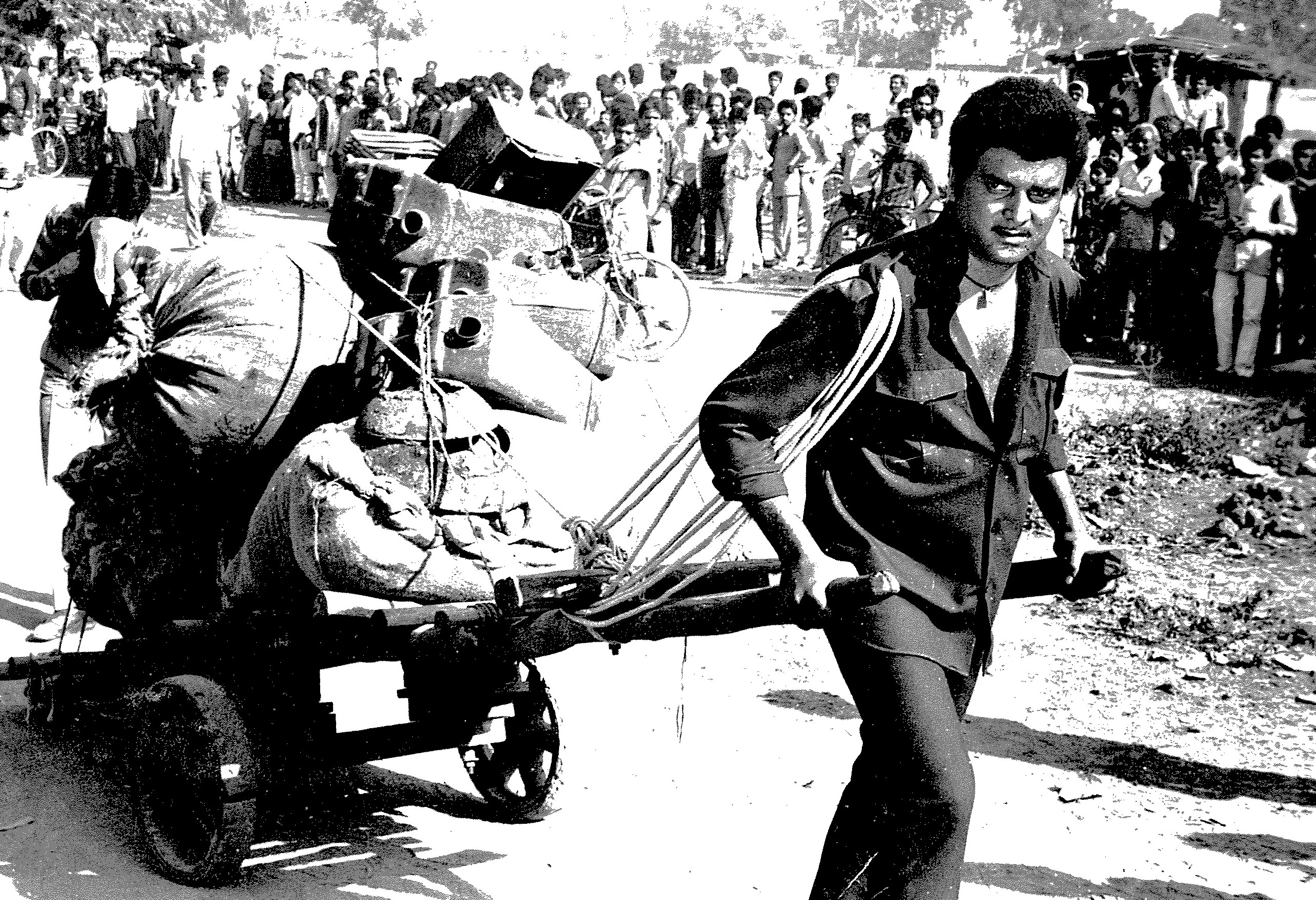
Film Hamar Dulha

== Filmography ==
Year	Film	Role	Notes
1980	Kal Hamara Hai		Hindi film
1981	Dharti Maiya		
1983	Ganga Kinare Mora Gaon		
1983	Hamar Bhauji		
1985	Bihari Babu		
1986	Dulha Ganga Paar ke		
1986	Beti Udhaar Ke		
1986	Sohag Bindiya		
1987	Dharti Ki Aawaz		
1988	Dagabaz Balma		
1989	Hamaar Dulha		
1990	Hamaar Betwa		
2005	Dulha Milal Dildar		
2007	Gangotri		
2022	Aashiqui	Satish Dubey	
2023	Aangan Ki Lakshmi		
2023	The Rise of Sudarshan Chakra		Hindi film
2024	Rang De Basanti		
2025	Ye Hai Swarg Hamara		

== Political career ==
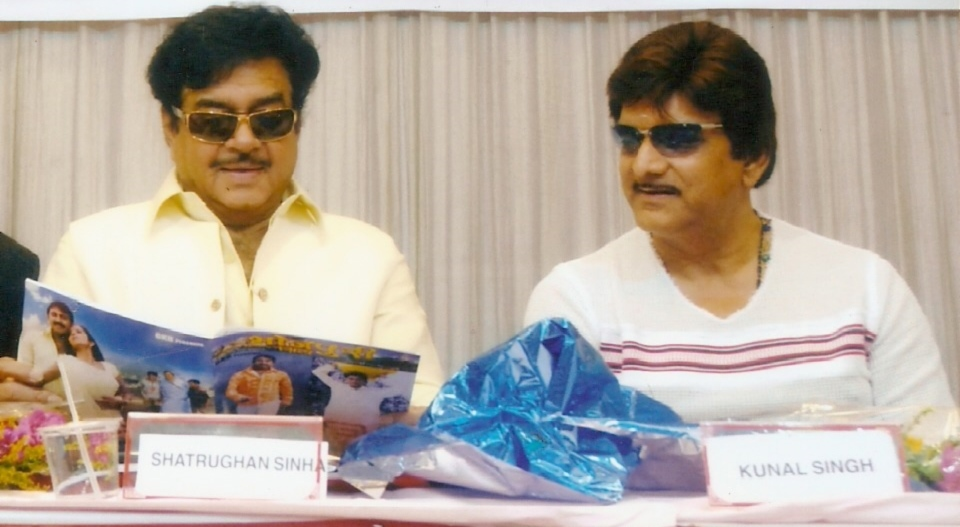
Yadav with Mr Shtrughan Sinha

He contested election in 2014 from Patna Sahib as a Congress Candidate against Bharatiya Janata Party candidate Shatrughan Sinha and lost the battle.

== Awards ==
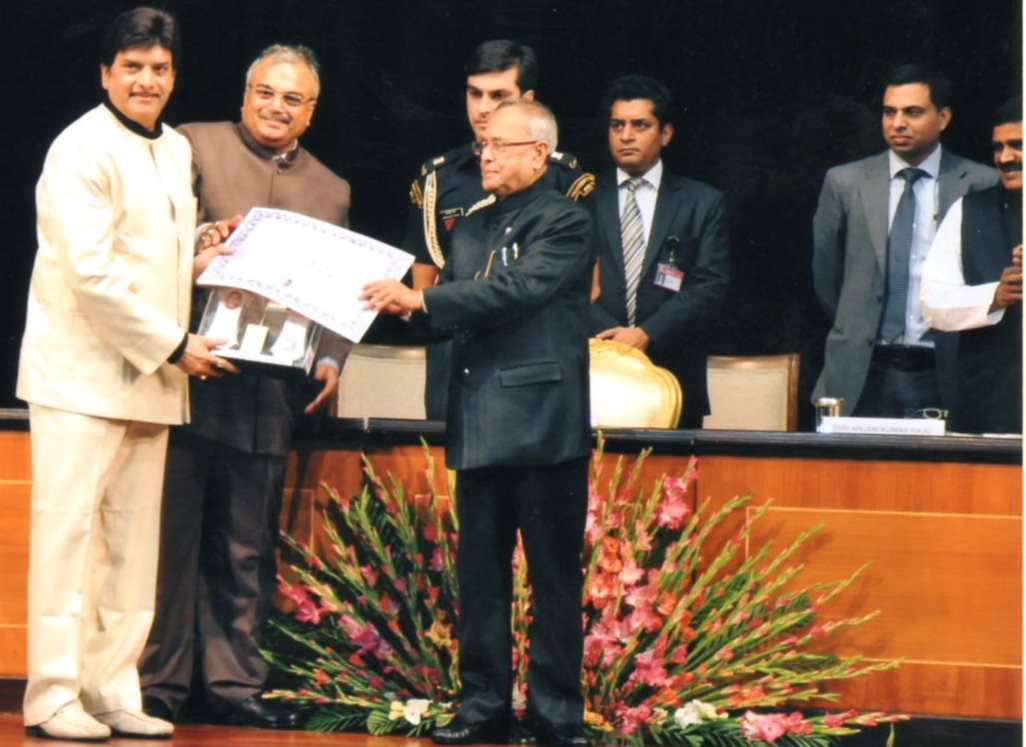
Awarded the RAMDHARI SINGH DINKAR AWARD by honorable President of India, Shri Pranab Mukherjee in 2012 at Rashtrapati Bhawan, New Delhi.

For his contributions to cinema, he was awarded the Rashtrakavi Dinkar Award in 2012 by Pranab Mukherjee
