= Prema Narayan =

Indian actress and model (born 1955)

- Born: 4 April 1955 (age 71); Kalimpong, West Bengal, India
- Occupations: Model; actress; dancer; teacher
- Beauty pageant titleholder
- Title: Femina Miss India World 1971; Femina Miss India Queen of the Pacific 1971
- Years active: 1974–1999
- Major competitions: Femina Miss India 1971 (Femina Miss India World) (Femina Miss India Queen of the Pacific); Queen of the Pacific 1972 (1st runner-up)

Prema Narayan (born 4 April 1955) is an Indian former actress, model, dancer and beauty pageant titleholder. She has acted in Hindi and Bengali cinema. She was the Femina Miss India World 1971, and represented India at Miss World 1971.

== Early life ==
Prema Narayan was born in Kalimpong, West Bengal. She is the niece of actor Anita Guha.

== Career ==
Prema Narayan was an English teacher in a convent school. Later she opted for modelling. In 1971, she participated in Femina Miss India contest and was crowned Femina Miss India World 1971. She represented India at Miss World 1971 but did not win. The same year she was appointed to represent India at Queen of the Pacific pageant held in Australia where she was crowned 1st runner-up.

=== Acting career ===
She chose Bollywood after offers started coming her way after winning the Femina Miss India contest. Her performance in films such as Manzilein Aur Bhi Hain (1973) and Maa Bahen Aur Biwi (1973) were noticed. She did not restrict herself as a leading lady as she was mostly considered for dancer/vamp or supporting roles. She got recognition for her work on being nominated in 1976 in Filmfare Award for Best Supporting Actress category for her performance as a sensuous village belle Dhanno in the Uttam Kumar-Sharmila Tagore film Amanush (1975). This role was a total deviation from her modern sex-symbol well-educated western image. Besides being noticed for her acting prowess she was also appreciated for her western-style dance numbers. She regularly featured in lower-grade horror films including Hotel, Mangalsutra, Saat Saal Baad and Ghabrahat.

Her last appearance was in Yeh Basti Badmashon Ki (1999).

== Personal life ==
She is married to Rajiv, a lawyer. The couple has two adult sons.

== Filmography ==
Year	Title	Role	Notes
1974	Jab Andhera Hota Hai	Roma	
1974	Ang Se Ang Lagaley	Neela	
1974	Maa Bahen Aur Biwi		
1974	Mere Saath Chal	Neena	
1974	Manzilein Aur Bhi Hain	Prostitute	
1974	My Friend		
1975	Amanush	Dhanno	
1975	Ponga Pandit	Lalita	
1976	Udhar Ka Sindur	Munni/Sita	
1976	Nagin	Woman in forest	
1976	Balika Badhu	Radhiya	
1977	Mukti	Mary	Guest Appearance
1977	Aafat	Champa	
1977	Anand Ashram	Kamli / Dancer	Guest appearance
1977	Haiwan		
1977	Karm	Savitri Kumar	
1977	Saal Solvan Chadya		
1977	Sandhya Raag		
1977	Dangal	Badamia	Bhojpuri film
1977	Ek Je Chhilo Desh		Bengali film
1977	Kabita	Mala Sinha's sister	Bengali film
1978	Bandie	Krishna	
1978	Ghar	Aarti's friend	
1978	Madhu Malti		
1978	Swarg Narak	Leena	
1979	Lahu Ke Do Rang	Anita/Meena	
1979	Mai Ka Lal		Bhojpuri film
1979	Prem Bandhan		
1979	Do Ladke Dono Kadke	Champa	
1979	Aangan Ki Kali	Doctor	
1979	Guru Ho Ja Shuru	Sheela	
1979	Ratnadeep	Champa	
1979	Surakshaa	Maggie	
1980	Choron Ki Baaraat	Sona	
1980	Jaaye To Jaaye Kahan		
1980	Takkar	Item dancer	Special Appearance (song "Ritu Ru Ritu Ru")
1981	Armaan		Special appearance
1981	Sahhas	Champabai	
1981	Hotel	Chhagan's Secretary "Shabho"	
1981	Biwi-O-Biwi	Rita	
1981	Mangalsutra	Kamini	
1981	Barsaat Ki Ek Raat	Phulwa	
1981	Umrao Jaan	Bismillah	
1982	Teri Maang Sitaron Se Bhar Doon	Mrs. Lobo	
1982	Ustadi Ustad Se	Prema	
1982	Satte Pe Satta	Mangal's girlfriend	
1982	Hamari Bahu Alka	Sudha	
1982	Lubna		
1983	Qayamat	Dancer/Singer	Special appearance
1983	Sweekar Kiya Maine	Lajjo	
1983	Justice Chaudhury	Alexander's girlfriend	
1983	Woh Jo Hasina		
1983	Karate	Zora	
1983	Kissi Se Na Kehna	Urvashi Mitra (Vyjayanti Aiyar)	
1983	Romance	Journalist/Editor's wife	
1983	Marad No Mandvo		Gujarati film
1984	Ghar Ek Mandir	Sapna's Friend	
1984	Jhutha Sach	Mrs. Prema Bhajanlal	
1984	Ram Ki Ganga	Courtesan	
1984	Baazi	Casino Singer	Special appearance
1984	Dhokebaaz		
1984	Shapath	Sheetal	
1985	Aandhi-Toofan		Special Appearance (song "Bareba Bareba")
1985	Jhoothi	Alpana	
1985	Baadal	Champa	
1985	Phoolan Devi	Meena	
1985	Bhago Bhut Aaya	Munni	
1985	Pataal Bhairavi	Nalini (Indumati's attendant)	
1985	Salma	Courtesan	
1986	Khel Mohabbat Ka	Ranjeet's Secretary	
1986	Jumbish: A Movement - The Movie	Secretary	
1986	Angaarey	Ms. Meena Srivastav – Police Sub-Inspector	
1986	Baat Ban Jaye	Cameo, in song "Raja Tori"	
1987	Param Dharam		Special appearance
1987	Majaal	Sandhya's Mother	
1987	Itihaas	Khursheed	
1987	7 Saal Baad	Lisa	
1987	Muqaddar Ka Faisla	Hired Dancer	
1988	Pyaar Ka Mandir	Anita G. Khaitan	
1988	Sagar Sangam		
1988	Waqt Ki Awaz		
1989	Desh Ke Dushman	Dancer in Kundan's Bar	
1989	Khoj	Dancer (song "Aaj Ki Biwi")	
1989	Anjaane Rishte	Prema (Ajay's wife)	
1989	Joshilaay		
1989	Suryaa: An Awakening	Dancer	
1990	Thanedaar	Lawrence's Girlfriend	
1995	Mera Damad	Shalu	
1999	Yeh Basti Badmashon Ki	Parvati (Kiran Kumar's wife)	

== Awards and nominations ==
- Filmfare Award for Best Supporting Actress: Amanush: Nominated
