= Dilraj Kaur =

Indian singer (born 1960)

- Born: Dilraj Kaur; 21 May 1960 (age 66); Mumbai, India
- Genres: Playback
- Occupation: Singer
- Years active: 1975–present

Dilraj Kaur (born 21 May 1960), is an Indian playback singer. She is most known for singing in films such as Galiyon Ka Badshah (2001), Me and Mr. Canadian (2019) etc. She has sung 286 songs in Hindi films.

== Career ==
Dilraj Kaur started to play the tabla and taking musical training at the age of seven. Her first movie was in the 1975 film Jaan Hazir Hai.

In 1980, she released the song "Gaddi Jaandi e" along with singers Mohammed Rafi, Shailendra Singh and Hemlata composed by Usha Khanna which became a hit. Her most famous song was "Mausam Mastana", a duet with Asha Bhosle, from the 1982 film Satte Pe Satta starring Amitabh Bachchan. This song has been recreated by Indian Idol Junior contestant Ananya Sritam Nanda in 2016.

She went on to sing "Mausam Mastana" for the 1982 film Satte Pe Satta. She has sung under the baton of all top music directors including R. D. Burman, Laxmikant–Pyarelal, Kalyanji–Anandji, Bappi Lahiri, Usha Khanna, and Ravindra Jain.

She also went on to sing "Janeman Janejan" for the 1983 unreleased film Chor Mandali.
