= Dangal (1977 film) =

1977 Indian Bhojpuri film

- Directed by: Rati Kumar
- Written by: Rajpati Rahi
- Produced by: Bachubhai Shah
- Starring: Sujit Kumar; Prema Narayan
- Release date: 1977
- Country: India
- Language: Bhojpuri

Dangal (transl. The Bout) is a 1977 Indian Bhojpuri-language film produced by Bachubhai Shah, directed by Rati Kumar, and written by Rajpati Rahi. Starring Sujit Kumar and Prema Narayan in the lead roles, it is the first color film made in Bhojpuri. The music of the film was composed by Nadeem–Shravan.

== Cast ==
- Sujit Kumar
- Prema Narayan
- Ram Singh
- Laxmi Chhaya

== Background ==
The film was produced during a lull in the Bhojpuri film industry. Between 1969 and 1976, only one film had been released, and there was no sense of a continuous Bhojpuri industry at the time. The movie emerged in a more open-ended production environment, less defined by the commercial constraints and audience stereotypes that would characterize later Bhojpuri cinema. To establish its regional identity, the film's opening credits feature shots of Varanasi (showing the ghats on the river Ganga) and Patna (showing landmarks like the Golghar and the Martyr's Memorial).

== Soundtrack ==
The song Kashi Hile Patna Hile is an important element of the film, as it is a direct adaptation of a very popular Bhojpuri folk song titled Aara Hile, Chhapra Hile. The filmmakers changed the lyrics in two significant ways. First, the original folk song's lyrics, Aara hile, Chhapra hile, Ballia hilela refer to three district headquarters that are considered the heartland of the Bhojpuri-speaking region.

These lyrics were changed to Kashi hile, Patna hile, Calcutta hilela in order to represent a thematic move away from a geographically contained homeland to a broader map defined by migration. Kashi (Varanasi), Patna, and Calcutta were all major destinations for people from the Bhojpuri region. Secondly, the perspective of the song was changed. In the film, it is sung by the male lead to the female lead ("when your waist sways"), changing it from the original version which is typically sung from a woman's perspective ("when my waist twitches").

- "Phoot Gaile Kismatiya" - Mohammed Rafi
- "Bada Pareshan" - Asha Bhosle
- "More Honthwa Se Nathuniya" - Asha Bhosle
- "Phoolwa Ki Beni Se" - Asha Bhosle
- Kashi Hile Patna Hile Kalkatta Hilela - Manna Dey

== Release and reception ==
The film was a success and did a business of 40,000 rupees in the first week.
