= Om Prakash Lal =

Former Cabinet Minister of Bihar (1941–2020)

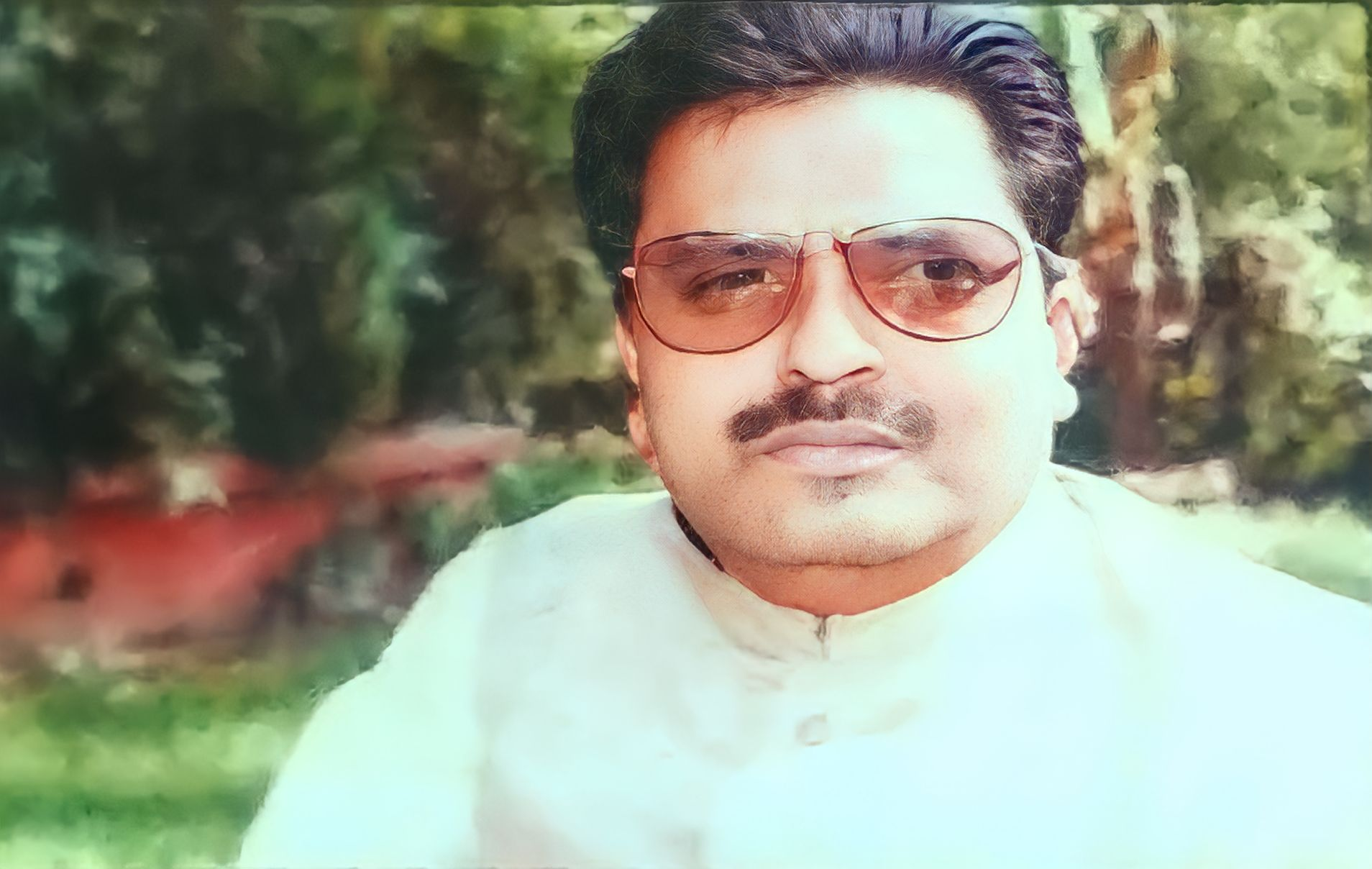
- Official Portrait of Shri Om Prakash Lal (O.P. Lal), Former Cabinet Minister of Bihar (1941–2020)

Member of Legislative Assembly (MLA)
- In office 1985–2000
- Preceded by: Shankar Dayal Singh
- Succeeded by: Jaleshwar Mahato
- Constituency: Baghmara

Cabinet Minister, Ministry of Mines & Geology
- In office 1985–1989
- Succeeded by: Sushila Kerketta

Minister of State, Ministry of Excise & Probation
- In office 1985–1990

Minister of State (Independent Charge), Ministry of Tourism
- In office 1990–1995

Minister of State (Independent Charge), Ministry of Information Technology
- In office 1995–2000

Personal details
- Born: October 23, 1941 Azamgarh, United Provinces, British India
- Died: November 21, 2020 (aged 79) Rims Trauma Centre and Central Emergency, Ranchi, Jharkhand, India
- Party: Indian National Congress (1985-2020)
- Spouse: Sobha Devi (1956-2020)
- Children: 4 sons, 1 daughter
- Parent: Jai Narayan Lal (father) • Sumitra Devi (mother)
- Education: Ranchi University (B.A. Political Science), Magadh University (LL.B. Criminal Law)
- Occupation: Advocate • Politician
- Nickname(s): O.P Lal, Lal Saheb or Lala Bhaiya

Om Prakash Lal (born on 23 October 1941 – 22 November 2020), popularly known as O.P. Lal, was an Indian politician who served as a Cabinet Minister, Minister of State (MoS) with Independent Charges and Member of Legislative Assembly (MLA) in Vidhan Sabha of Government of Bihar. He represented the Baghmara constituency of Jharkhand, then part of undivided Bihar, for three consecutive terms from 1985 to 2000. Lal made significant contributions to the fields of Excise & Probation, Mines & Geology, Tourism, and Information Technology during his political career.

Political Succession

Among the five children of OP Lal, only one, Ashok Prakash Lal, is actively involved in politics. Currently serving as the Vice President in the District Congress Committee, Ashok Prakash Lal also holds significant roles within the trade union, specifically with the Indian National Trade Union Congress (INTUC). With a growing support base, many people envision him as the prospective MLA for his father's constituency (Baghmara) in the future.

== Early life and education ==
Om Prakash Lal was born on October 23, 1941, into a Chitraguptvanshi Kayastha family in Azamgarh, Uttar Pradesh, India, to Shri Jai Narayan Lal and Smt. Sumitra Devi. His family later migrated from Azamgarh to Katras, Bihar. His father Jai Narayan Lal, in partnership with Bishwanath Prasad Shahabadi, produced the first Bhojpuri movie on behest of the first president of India, Dr. Rajendra Prasad, "Ganga Maiyya Tohe Piyari Chadhaibo," which was released in 1963.

After completing his schooling in Dhanbad, Lal pursued his Bachelor of Arts (B.A) in Political Science from Ranchi University. Subsequently, he earned a Bachelor of Law (LL.B.) degree in Criminal Law from Magadh University.

Lal embarked on his career as a criminal lawyer, gradually establishing himself as a prominent advocate in Bihar.

== Political career ==
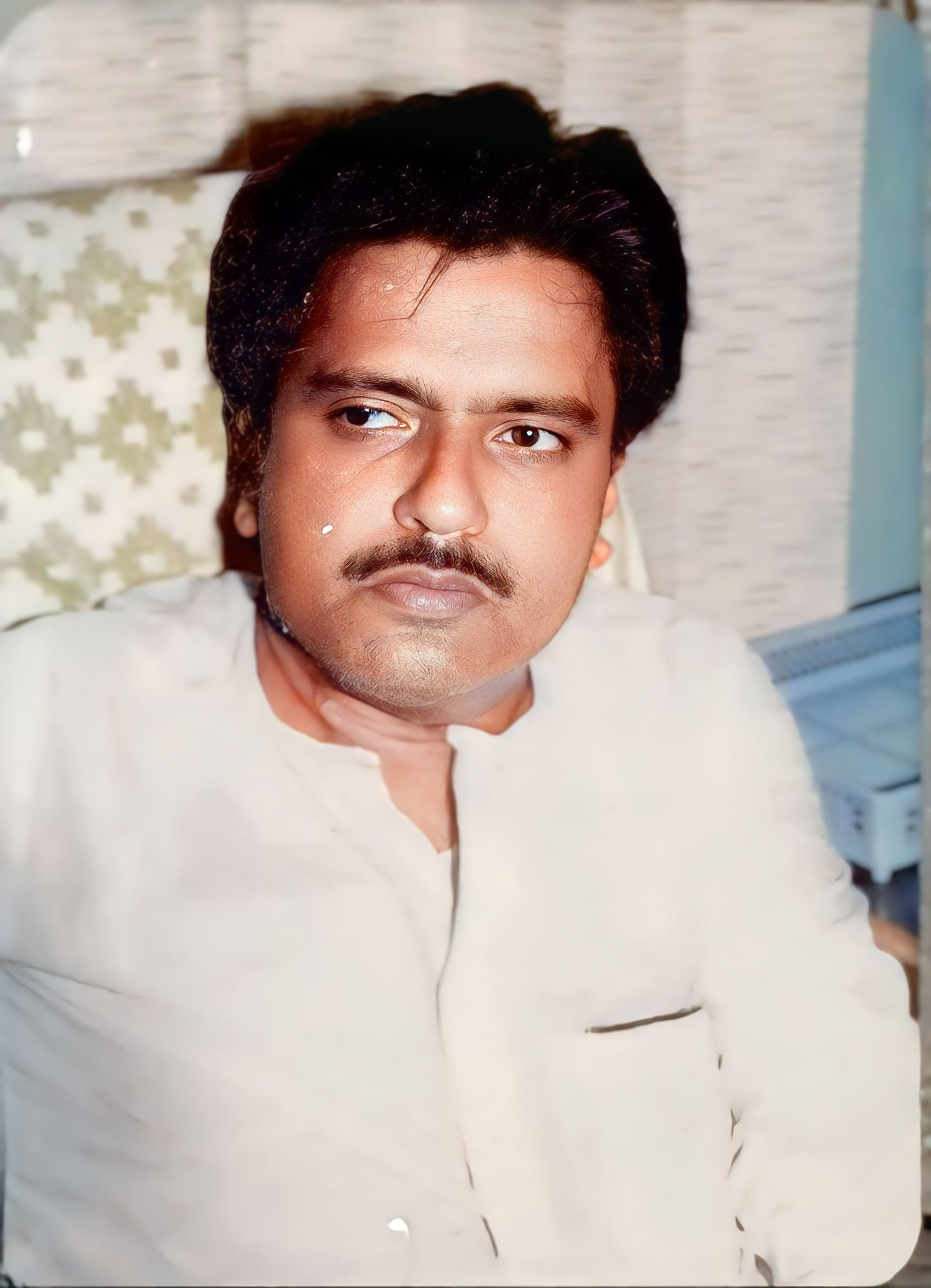
Photograph of Shri Om Prakash Lal (O.P. Lal), taken between 1985 and 1990.

Lal's political career was characterized by his dedication to public service, advocacy for the welfare of the people, and unwavering commitment to justice. As a three-time MLA representing the Baghmara constituency and became the first MLA to score a hat-trick in Baghmara, he diligently championed the interests of his constituents. His tenure as a minister in the cabinets of Bindeshwari Dubey, Satyendra Narayan Sinha, and Jagannath Mishra further solidified his reputation as a committed leader in Bihar.

=== Advocacy for workers' rights ===
During his term as the Minister of Mines and Geology in undivided Bihar, Lal exhibited remarkable political determination and a deep concern for the rights of laborers. He fearlessly rebelled against his own government to address the inhumane practice of burdening workers with coal-laden baskets. Recognizing the hardships faced by laborers who carried heavy coal baskets on their heads and loaded them onto truck-dumpers, Lal vehemently opposed this system.

Driven by his dedication to improving working conditions, Lal demanded a more humane approach to coal transportation, advocating for the use of conveyor belts or trolleys instead of manual labour. His unwavering commitment to this cause led him to express his willingness to resign from his ministerial post, challenging the government's stance and fighting for more efficient and worker-friendly methods.

In response to Lal's rebellion, the Bihar government took action by submitting a proposal to the Ministry of Agriculture. Recognizing the validity of Lal's concerns, the ministry agreed to implement the proposed changes. Within a year, significant progress was achieved: the burdensome basket system was abolished, conveyor belts were installed at the Coal mines, and trolleys were introduced in various other mines. These transformative measures relieved laborers from the arduous task of carrying heavy coal-laden baskets on their heads.

=== Struggle against mafia forces and party loyalty ===
In addition to his work in the mining sector, Lal's political career was intertwined with the struggle against mafia forces in the Baghmara region. His involvement in social and cultural activities during the early stages of his political journey brought him close to former MLA, former MP, and minister Shankar Dayal Singh and his brother-in-law, who were vocal opponents of the mafia.

The 1980s witnessed a significant incident that further elevated Lal's popularity and cemented his reputation as a leader dedicated to combating the mafia. Despite a fatal attack orchestrated by the mafia, Lal survived unharmed. In a powerful display of solidarity, the people of Katras organized protest processions, carrying Lal on a rickshaw. This incident bolstered Lal's support and earned him the endearing moniker or nickname " Lala Bhaiya" in the city.

Lal's association with senior Congress leader Bindeshwari Dubey, who ultimately ascended to the position of the 17th Chief Minister of Bihar, serving from 1985 to 1988. Proved instrumental in his political journey, increasing his penetration in the political corridors. With Dubey's support, Lal contested and won the 1985 assembly elections as the Congress candidate from the Baghmara constituency, defeating his opponent from the Janata Party.

Subsequent elections saw Lal remaining loyal to the Congress party and securing victories in 1990 and 1995, defeating his opponents, including Jaleshwar Mahato. However, in the 2000 elections, Lal faced defeat at the hands of Mahato.

Throughout his political career, Lal demonstrated exemplary party loyalty, steadfastly adhering to the principles and ideology of the Congress. He maintained a strong association with the Indian National Trade Union Congress (INTUC) and held significant positions within the organization, including National General Secretary and Jharkhand's president.

Lal's commitment to workers' rights and welfare led him to join the trade union movement in 1973, becoming the branch secretary of the INTUC-affiliated Colliery Trade Union in Ramkanali Colliery. His expertise in labour-related matters garnered national recognition, leading to his appointment as a standard member of the Nagda Khan Accident Investigation Committee by the Central Government.

Additionally, Lal actively engaged with various institutions, contributing to their development and welfare initiatives. He played a pivotal role in the sustained agitation against the closure of the Dhanbad-Chandrapura Railway line.

== Personal life ==
Lal was married to Smt. Sobha Devi in 1956. The couple had four sons and one daughter. Lal's death on November 22, 2020, at the age of 79 at RIMS, Trauma Centre and Central Emergency in Ranchi, Jharkhand, was mourned by Chief Minister (CM) of Jharkhand Shri. Hemant Soren, colleagues, friends, and the people he served throughout his political career. His funeral was conducted with state honours at Lilori Temple, Katras, Dhanbad, Jharkhand. Shri Badal Patralekh, Agriculture Minister, along with numerous MLAs, MPs, and district administrative officers, were present during the ceremony.

== Positions held ==
- Member of Legislative Assembly (MLA) from Baghmara constituency of Jharkhand, then in undivided Bihar (1985-2000).
- Cabinet Minister in Pt. Bindeswari Dubey's Cabinet for Ministry of Excise & Probation and Ministry of Mines & Geology.
- Minister of State (Independent Charge) in the Ministry of Tourism in Satyendra Narayan Singh's Cabinet.
- Minister of State (Independent Charge) in Jagannath Mishra's Cabinet for Ministry of Information Technology.
- Senior Vice President in Jharkhand State Indian National Mineworkers' Federation (INMF) and Indian National Trade Union Congress (INTUC).
- Executive Chairman in Rastriya Colliery Majdoor Sangh (RCMS), Jharkhand.
