= Tanushree Chatterjee =

Indian Bhojpuri actress

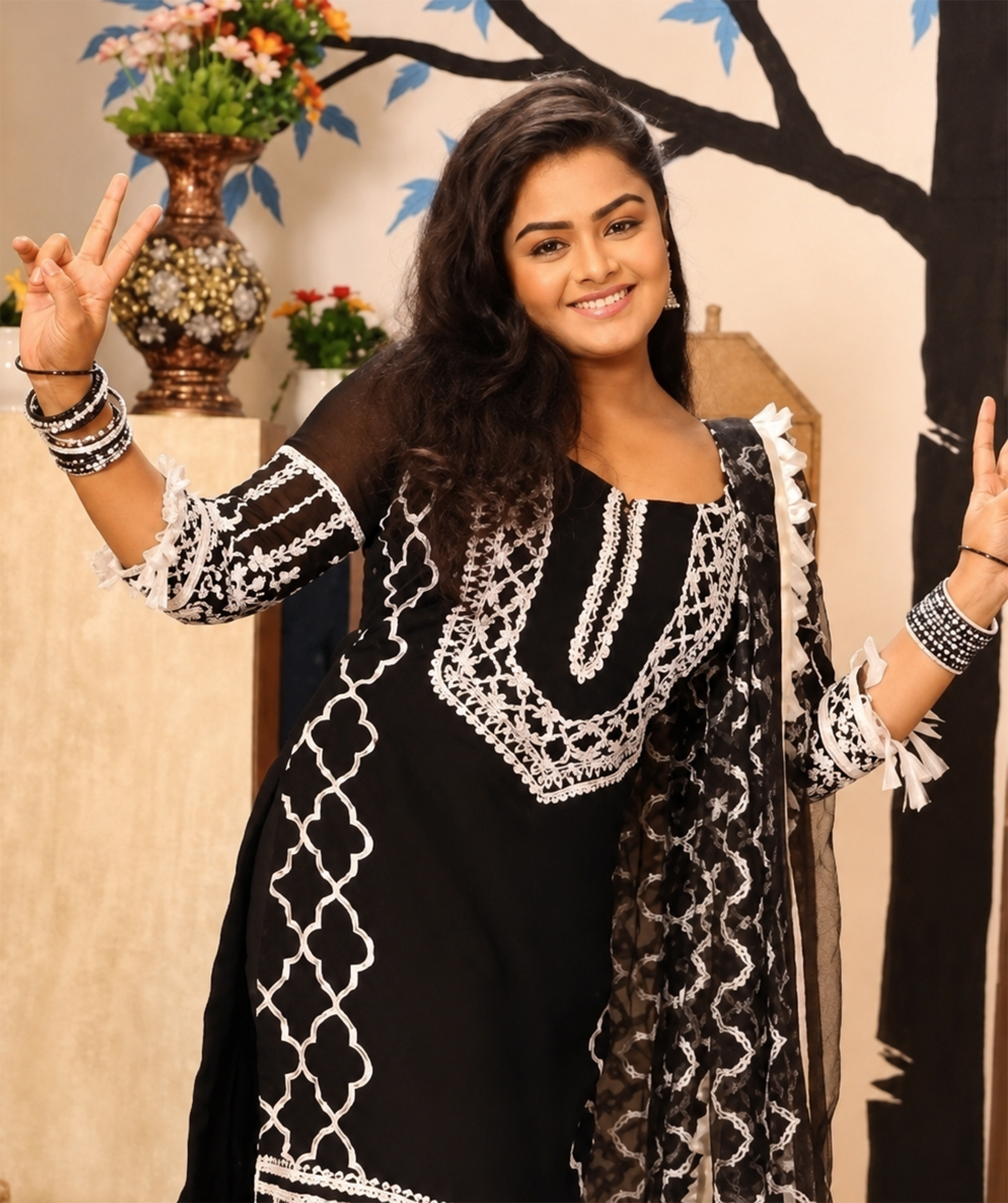
- Chatterjee in 2026
- Born: 5 April
- Occupation: Actress
- Years active: 2006- Present
- Notable work: Jaan Tere Naam, Dulhan Chahi Pakistan Se, Dulaara

Tanushree Chatterjee (born 5 April) is an Indian actress who primarily works in Bhojpuri films. She ventured into Bhojpuri films with Jaan Tere Naam (2012). Tanushree established herself as a leading Bhojpuri actress with successful films such as, Dulaara(2015), Dulhan Chahi Pakistan Se (2016), Chhaila Sandhu (2021), Darar 2 (forthcoming), and Badhayi ho (2023).

== Early life ==
Tanushree has appeared in several Bhojpuri films and music videos. According to The Times of India, her notable works include Jaan Tere Naam (2012), Dulaara (2015), Dulhan Chahi Pakistan Se (2016), Jwala (2016), Awara Balam (2018), Chhaila Sandhu (2021), Badhayi Ho (2023), and Lachhminiya (2024). She has also featured in popular Bhojpuri music videos with actors including Khesari Lal Yadav, Vishal Singh, and Arvind Akela Kallu.

== Filmography ==
Year	Film	Co-actors	Language
2011	Hu Tari Meera Ne Tu Maro Shyam Re	Keshto Iqbal, Dhawan Mewada	Gujrati
2012	Bhai ji	Viraj Bhatt, Brijesh Tripathi	Bhojpuri
2012	Jaan Tere Naam	Khesari Lal Yadav, Viraj Bhatt	Bhojpuri
2012	Jaanwar	Viraj Bhatt, Priya Sharma	Bhojpuri
2013	Dand Bhumi	Viraj Bhatt, Mushtaq Khan	Bhojpuri
2013	Kanchan Man Ganga Tan Tulshi	Deepak Dube	Bhojpuri
2013	Panchayat	Kajal raghwani, Viraj Bhatt	Bhojpuri
2013	Tuhi To Meri Jaan Ho Radha	Viraj Bhatt	Bhojpuri
2013	Ziddi Ashiq	Pawan Singh	Bhojpuri
2014	Fir Daulat Ki Jung	Akshara Singh, Viraj Bhatt	Bhojpuri
2014	Shola Shabnam	Khesari Lal Yadav	Bhojpuri
2015	Dulaara	Pradeep Pandey, Awdhesh Mishra, Rani Chatterjee	Bhojpuri
2015	Hukumat	Pawan Singh, Kajal Raghwani	Bhojpuri
2015	Madhubala	Rakesh Mishra	Bhojpuri
2015	Nahle Pe Dahla	Pawan Singh	Bhojpuri
2015	Tere Ishq Me Ho Gaya Main Ishqbaaz	Rakesh Mishra	Bhojpuri
2016	Dharm Ke Saudagar	Ravi Kishan	Bhojpuri
2016	Dil Hai Ki Manta Nahi	Rakesh Mishra, Viraj Bhatt	Bhojpuri
2016	Dulhan Chahi Pakistan Se	Pradeep Pandey, Shubhi Sharma	Bhojpuri
2016	Jwala	Khesari Lal Yadav, Brajesh Tripathi	Bhojpuri
2016	Le Aaaib Dulhaniya Pakistan Se	Awdhesh Mishra, Vishal Singh	Bhojpuri
2016	Teri Meri Aashiqui	Sujit Kumar Puri	Bhojpuri
2017	The Power Of Dahshat	Priyanka Pandit, Satendra Singh	Bhojpuri
2017	Trishool	Arvind Akela Kallu, Anjana Singh	Bhojpuri
2017	Rangeela	Pradeep Pandey, Punam Dube,Awdhesh Mishra	Bhojpuri
2018	Awara Balam	Arvind Akela Kallu, Priyanka Pandit	Bhojpuri
2018	Shadi Kar Ke Phas Gaya Yaar	Aaditya Ojha, Neha Shree	Bhojpuri
2019	Dulhan Hum Le Jayenge	Rishabh Kashyap	Bhojpuri
2019	Jawani Ki Rail Kahi Choot Na Jaye	Arvind Akela Kallu	Bhojpuri
2019	Main Super King Don Hu	Pramod Premi Yadav	Bhojpuri
2020	Yaar Badal Na Jaana	Pramod Premi Yadav	Bhojpuri
2021	Chhaila Sandhu	Rahul Singh	Bhojpuri
2021	More Rang De Piya Ke Rang Sajana	Sangram Singh	Bhojpuri
2021	Sajai Na Doli	Gunjan singh	Bhojpuri
2022	Mor Maya La Rakhe Rahibe	Siraj Anwar Sayyed	Chhattisgarhi
2022	Dil Dhak Dhak Kare	Arvind Akela Kallu	Bhojpuri
2022	Namak Harram	Ashi Tiwari, Mahi Khan	Bhojpuri
2023	Badhayi ho	Sumit Chandravanshi	Bhojpuri
2023	Namak Haram		Bhojpuri
2024	Agnisakshi	Pradeep Pandey, Akshara Singh	Bhojpuri

Forthcoming

Film	Co-actor	Language
Darar 2	Kajal Raghwani, Anjana Singh, Shubhi Sharma, Ritesh Pandey (singer)	Bhojpuri
Lachhminiya	Sagar Singh	Hindi
