= National Film Award for Best Short Film (Up to 30 Min) =

Indian film award

National Film Award for Best Short Film (upto 30 mins)
- National award for contributions to non-feature films
- Sponsored by: National Film Development Corporation of India
- Formerly called: National Film Award for Best Short Fiction Film (1987–2021)
- Rewards: Rajat Kamal (Silver Lotus); ₹2,00,000
- First award: 1987
- Most recent winner: Giddh (2023)

The National Film Award for Best Short Film (upto 30 mins) is one of the National Film Awards presented annually by the National Film Development Corporation of India. It is one of several awards presented for non-feature films and awarded with Rajat Kamal (Silver Lotus).

The award was instituted in 1987, at 35th National Film Awards and awarded annually for the short films produced in the year across the country, in all Indian languages. Since the 70th National Film Awards (2022), the category name was changed to "Best Short Film (upto 30 mins)".

== Awards ==
Award includes 'Rajat Kamal' (Silver Lotus Award) and cash prize. Cash prize amount varied over the period. Following table illustrates the cash prize amount over the years:

Year (Period)	Cash prize
1987–2005	Producer and Director: Rajat Kamal and ₹10,000 (US$110) Each
2006–2021	Producer and Director: Rajat Kamal and ₹50,000 (US$530) Each
2022–present	Producer and Director: Rajat Kamal and ₹2 lakh (US$2,100) Each

=== Winners ===
Following are the award winners over the years:

Indicates a joint award for that year

List of films, showing the year, language(s), producer(s) and director(s)
Year	Film(s)	Language(s)	Producer(s)	Director(s)	Refs.
1987 (35th)	The Eight Column Affair	English	FTII	Sriram Raghavan	
1988 (36th)	The Story of Tiblu	Idu Mishmi	Santosh Sivan	Santosh Sivan	
1989 (37th)	Behula	Bengali	Raja Mitra	Raja Mitra	
1990 (38th)	Aamukh	Hindi	FTII	Rajkumar	
1991 (39th)	Punaravritti	Hindi	FTII	Imo Singh	
1991 (39th)	Totanama	Hindi	Vikas Satwalekar	Chandita Mukherjee	
1992 (40th)	Agar Aap Chahein	Hindi	Shahnaz Rahim for Films Division	Mazahir Rahim	
1993 (41st)	Sunday	Hindi	National Center of Films for Children and Young People	Pankaj Advani	
1994 (42nd)	Still Life	Hindi and English	FTII	Subhadro Chowdhary	
1995 (43rd)	The Rebel	Hindi	John Sankaramangalam	Rajashree	
1996 (44th)	Vidiyalai Nokki	Tamil	F and T and V. T. I. N. Chennai	P. Venkatesh	
1996 (44th)	Athmeeyam	Malayalam	FTII	Nandakumar Kavil	
1997 (45th)	Hypnothesis	Hindi	FTII	Rajat Kapoor	
1998 (46th)	Jee Karta Tha	Hindi	Mohan Agashe for Films Division	Hansa Thapliyal	
1999 (47th)	Blind Folded	Tamil	A. Sriram	S. Sri Ram	
2000 (48th)	Bhor	Bengali	Satyajit Ray Film and Television Institute	Ritubarna Chudgar	
2001 (49th)	Chaitra	Marathi	FTII	Kranti Kanade	
2002 (50th)	Sunder Jibon	Bengali	Satyajit Ray Film and Television Institute	Sandeep Chattopadhyay	
2003 (51st)	Sati Radhika	Assamese	Anjali Das	Anjali Das	
2004 (52nd)	Cradle Song	English and Hindi	Tripurari Sharan	Nimisha Pandey	
2005 (53rd)	Thackkayin Meedha Naangu Kangal	Tamil	Doordarshan and Ray Cinema	Vasanth	
2006 (54th)	Ek Aadesh: Command For Choti	Hindi	Children's Film Society	Ramesh Asher	
2007 (55th)	Udedh Bun	Bhojpuri	FTII	Siddharth Sinha	
2008 (56th)	Stations	Hindi, Marathi and English	FTII	Emmanuel Palo	
2009 (57th)	Boond	Hindi	Kumar Mangat	Abhishek Pathak	
2010 (58th)	Kal 15 August Dukan Band Rahegi	Hindi	FTII	Prateek Vats	
2011 (59th)	Panchakki	Hindi	Sanjeev Rattan	Sanjeev Rattan	
2012 (60th)	Kaatal	Marathi	FTII	Vikrant Pawar	
2013 (61st)	Mandrake ! Mandrake !	Hindi	FTII	Ruchir Arun	
2014 (62nd)	Mitraa	Marathi	Athaansh Communications	Ravindra Jadhav	
2015 (63rd)	Aushadh	Marathi	Amol Deshmukh	Amol Deshmukh	
2016 (64th)	Aaba	English	Raj Kumar Gupta	Amar Kaushik	
2017 (65th)	Mayat	Marathi	Suyash Shinde	Suyash Shinde	
2018 (66th)	Kharvas	Marathi	Aditya Suhas Jambhale	Aditya Suhas Jambhale	
2019 (67th)	Custody	Hindi	Ambiecka Pandit	Ambiecka Pandit	
2020 (68th)	Kachichinithu (The Boy with a Gun)	Karbi	Khanjan Kishore Nath	Khanjan Kishore Nath	
2021 (69th)	Dal Bhat	Gujarati	Nemil Shah	Nemil Shah	
2022 (70th)	Xunyota	Assamese	HM Production	Nabapan Deka	
2023 (71st)	Giddh (The Scavenger)	Hindi	Ellanar Films	Manish Saini	
2024 (72nd)	Hamsafar	Marathi	Narendra Shantikumar	Abhijeet Arvind Dalvi	
