= 55th National Film Awards =

Indian ceremony celebrating cinema of 2007

- Awarded for: Best of Indian cinema in 2007
- Awarded by: Directorate of Film Festivals
- Presented by: Pratibha Patil (President of India)
- Announced on: 7 September 2009
- Presented on: 21 October 2009
- Site: Vigyan Bhawan, New Delhi
- Official website: dff.nic.in

Highlights
- Best Feature Film: Kanchivaram
- Best Non-Feature Film: Hope Dies Last In War
- Best Book: From Raj to Swaraj: The Non-fiction Film In India
- Best Film Critic: V. K. Joseph
- Dadasaheb Phalke Award: Manna Dey
- Most awards: • Gandhi, My Father • Taare Zameen Par (3)

The 55th National Film Awards, presented by Directorate of Film Festivals, the organisation set up by Ministry of Information and Broadcasting, India to felicitate the best of Indian Cinema released in the year 2007.

Three different committees were instituted in order to judge the various entries for feature film, non-feature film and best writing on cinema sections; headed by National award winner director, Sai Paranjpye, for feature films and Ashoke Viswanathan along with Namita Gokhale for non-feature films and best writing on cinema sections, respectively.

Each chairperson announced the award on 7 September 2009 for their respective sections and award ceremony took place at Vigyan Bhavan, New Delhi with President of India, Pratibha Patil giving away the awards on 21 October 2009.

== Awards ==
Awards were divided into feature films, non-feature films and books written on Indian cinema.

=== Lifetime Achievement Award ===
Lifetime achievement award is given to the prominent personality from the Indian film industry for the significant contributions given.

==== Juries ====
A committee consisting four eminent personalities from Indian film industry was appointed to evaluate the lifetime achievement award, Dadasaheb Phalke Award. Following were the jury members:

- Jury members
  - Akkineni Nageswara Rao • Yash Chopra • Vijaya Mulay • Amjad Ali Khan

Name of award	Image	Awardee(s)	Awarded as	Awards
Dadasaheb Phalke Award		Manna Dey	Playback singer	Swarna Kamal, ₹ 1,000,000 and a shawl

=== Feature films ===
Feature films were awarded at All India as well as regional level. For 55th National Film Awards, a Tamil film, Kanchivaram won the National Film Award for Best Feature Film; whereas a Hindi film, Gandhi, My Father won the maximum number of awards (3). Following were the awards given in each category:

==== Juries ====
A committee headed by Sai Paranjpye was appointed to evaluate the feature films awards. Following were the jury members:

- Jury members
  - Sai Paranjpye (Chairperson) • Nemai Ghosh • Manju Borah • Ahsan Muzid • Arup Manna • Mohan Sharma • K. S. Sivaraman
  - Rajendra Narayan Talak • Kesari Harvoo • Ervelle Menezes • Sibi Malayil • Sunny Joseph • Satya Paul • Pratibha Prahlad

==== All India Award ====
Following were the awards given:

===== Golden Lotus Award =====
Official name: Swarna Kamal

All the awardees are awarded with 'Golden Lotus Award (Swarna Kamal)', a certificate and cash prize.

Name of Award	Name of Film	Language	Awardee(s)	Cash prize
Best Feature Film	Kanchivaram	Tamil	Producer: Percept Picture Company; Director: Priyadarshan	₹ 2,50,000/- Each
Best Feature Film	Citation: For presenting a rare portrayal of Kanchi's silk weaver community, and the internal struggle of a weaver caught between his ideals and personal reams. A vibrant story and technical excellence blend to create a total cinematic experience.			
Best Debut Film of A Director	Frozen	Hindi, Ladakhi	Producer: Shivajee Chandrabhushan; Director: Shivajee Chandrabhushan	₹ 1,25,000/- Each
Best Debut Film of A Director	Citation: For bringing to life with warmth and vivacity life in those distant desolate snow bound heights where existence itself is a fulltime challenge.			
Best Popular Film Providing Wholesome Entertainment	Chak De! India	Hindi	Producer: Aditya Chopra; Director: Shimit Amin	₹ 2,00,000/- Each
Best Popular Film Providing Wholesome Entertainment	Citation: For thoroughly entertaining the audience, making one proud to be an Indian. A masterpiece of inspired filmmaking.			
Best Children's Film	Foto	Hindi	Producer: Children's Film Society; Director: Virendra Saini	₹ 1,50,000/- Each
Best Children's Film	Citation: For unfolding a magic world of images and sound to a talented young child by highlighting the milestones of cinema history in a lucid manner.			
Best Animated Film	Inimey Nangathan	Tamil	Producer: S. Sridevi; Director: S. Venky Baboo	₹ 1,00,000/- Each
Best Animated Film	Citation: For creating endearing characters who with their breath taking quixotic antics, battle the evil force of greed, in a refreshingly new manner. For taking animation in a new direction.			
Best Direction	Naalu Pennungal	Malayalam	Adoor Gopalakrishnan	₹ 2,50,000/-
Best Direction	Citation: For his delicate and subtle handling of gender issues in a conventional society. Four women of different marital status are trivialised and subjected to abject neglect by their immediate partners and family.			

===== Silver Lotus Award =====
Official name: Rajat Kamal

All the awardees are awarded with 'Silver Lotus Award (Rajat Kamal)', a certificate and cash prize.

Name of Award	Name of Film	Language	Awardee(s)	Cash prize
Best Feature Film on National Integration	Dharm	Hindi	Producer: Sheetal V. Talwar; Director: Bhavna Talwar	₹ 1,50,000/- Each
Best Feature Film on National Integration	Citation: For powerfully bringing forth the message that humanity is of much greater value than religion. The transformation of an orthodox and superstitious priest is very beautifully depicted.			
Best Film on Family Welfare	Taare Zameen Par	Hindi	Producer: Aamir Khan; Director: Aamir Khan	₹ 1,50,000/- Each
Best Film on Family Welfare	Citation: For realistically depicting the psychological dialectic between an ordinary family driving their children to educational excellence, thereby neglecting their specially gifted child dealing with the problem of dyslexia in isolation.			
Best Film on Other Social Issues	Antardwand	Hindi	Producer: Sushil Rajpal; Director: Sushil Rajpal	₹ 1,50,000/- Each
Best Film on Other Social Issues	Citation: For exposing the "marriages for sale" racket and dramatically presenting a browbeaten girl who finds her courage and her voice and rebels against her tyrannical father.			
Best Actor	Kanchivaram	Tamil	Prakash Raj	₹ 50,000/-
Best Actor	Citation: For his sensible multilayered portrayal of a weaver caught in a web of silken threads, woven by destiny.			
Best Actress	Gulabi Talkies	Kannada	Umashree	₹ 50,000/-
Best Actress	Citation: For a heart rending portrayal of the sorry plight of a wronged woman belonging to a minority community surrounded by an uncaring and hostile society.			
Best Supporting Actor	Gandhi, My Father	• Hindi • English	Darshan Jariwala	₹ 50,000/-
Best Supporting Actor	Citation: For truthfully portraying the angst of a great historical figure – Mahatma Gandhi. The Father of the Nation stands defeated in his personal relationship with his own son.			
Best Supporting Actress	The Last Lear	English	Shefali Shah	₹ 50,000/-
Best Supporting Actress	Citation: For her smoldering portrayal of a woman dealing with her intense relationship with an older man with a towering personality.			
Best Child Artist	Tingya	Marathi	Sharad Goekar	₹ 50,000/-
Best Child Artist	Citation: For covering the range from tenderness to angry defiance with consummate ease, while portraying Tingya – a boy whose love for his Ox is the driving force of his young life.			
Best Male Playback Singer	Taare Zameen Par ("Maa")	Hindi	Shankar Mahadevan	₹ 50,000/-
Best Male Playback Singer	Citation: For the plaintive rendition of a soulful song which is a musical expression of a theme which touches the heart.			
Best Female Playback Singer	Jab We Met ("Yeh Ishq Haaye")	Hindi	Shreya Ghoshal	₹ 50,000/-
Best Female Playback Singer	Citation: For her mellifluous voice and rich tonal quality. Her rendition evokes the beauty of nature through its subtle nuances.			
Best Cinematography	Frozen	Hindi and Ladakhi	Cameraman: Shanker Raman; Laboratory Processing: Deluxe Laboratories Inc.	₹ 50,000/- Each
Best Cinematography	Citation: For the artistic and technical excellence of cinematography revealed through superb reproduction of tonalities and stark compositions, maintaining the texture on high altitude.			
Best Screenplay	Gandhi, My Father	• Hindi • English	Feroz Abbas Khan	₹ 50,000/-
Best Screenplay	Citation: For the imaginative and emotional handling of uncompromisingly steadfast side of the Father of the Nation with special reference to his relationship with his troublesome son.			
Best Audiography	1971	Hindi	Kunal Sharma	₹ 50,000/-
Best Audiography	Citation: For capturing the mood and tension of that wartorn period which marked the climax of the deteriorating ties with our neighbours.			
Best Editing	Naalu Pennungal	Malayalam	B. Ajith Kumar	₹ 50,000/-
Best Editing	Citation: For presenting at a uniform pace four different stories which unfold as a single entity.			
Best Art Direction	Om Shanti Om	Hindi	Sabu Cyril	₹ 50,000/-
Best Art Direction	Citation: For creating authentic film settings of 1970s and recreating them in a dilapidated condition a generation later.			
Best Costume Design	Krishnakanter Will	Bengali	Ruma Sengupta	₹ 50,000/-
Best Costume Design	Citation: For creating realistic characters during that historic period when lavish costumes and colourful court life, were the order of the day.			
Best Make-up Artist	Paradesi	Malayalam	Pattanam Rasheed	₹ 50,000/-
Best Make-up Artist	Citation: For technical excellence of detailing through makeup the character of the protagonist.			
Best Music Direction	Ore Kadal	Malayalam	Ouseppachan	₹ 50,000/-
Best Music Direction	Citation: For achieving through music the poignancy of the turmoil of unconventional love.			
Best Lyrics	Taare Zameen Par	Hindi	Prasoon Joshi	₹ 50,000/-
Best Lyrics	Citation: For the soulful poetry that captures the trauma of a family beset with a rare problem of their little son who is happily saved by an understanding teacher.			
Best Special Effects	Sivaji	Tamil	M/s Indian Artists	₹ 50,000/-
Best Special Effects	Citation: For the pioneering effort of rendering tones and textures that assume realistic proportions. Turing dark skin tone to fair by painstaking computer graphic work is most convincingly done.			
Best Choreography	Jab We Met ("Yeh Ishq Haaye")	Hindi	Saroj Khan	₹ 50,000/-
Best Choreography	Citation: For the lively depiction of a colourful local hill song against a mountainous backdrop.			
Special Jury Award	Gandhi, My Father	• Hindi • English	• Anil Kapoor (Producer) • Feroz Abbas Khan (Director)	₹ 62,500/- Each
Special Jury Award	Citation: For throwing light on a relatively unknown aspect of the Father of the Nation and his stormy relationship with his difficult rebellious son, in a rare and compelling manner.			

==== Regional Awards ====
The award is given to best film in the regional languages in India.

Name of Award	Name of Film	Awardee(s)	Cash prize
Best Feature Film in Bengali	Ballygunge Court	Producer: Ganesh Kumar Bagaria; Director: Pinaki Chaudhuri	₹ 1,00,000/- Each
Best Feature Film in Bengali	Citation: For providing a powerful commentary on the travails of ageing in an urban milieu.		
Best Feature Film in Hindi	1971	Producer: Sagar Films (Pvt. Ltd.); Director: Amrit Sagar	₹ 1,00,000/- Each
Best Feature Film in Hindi	Citation: For a sensitive depiction of the ordeal of Indian prisoners of war trapped between extreme hostility and official apathy in an alien land and showing fortitude in a hopeless situation.		
Best Feature Film in Kannada	Gulabi Talkies	Producer: Basant Kumar Patil; Director: Girish Kasaravalli	₹ 1,00,000/- Each
Best Feature Film in Kannada	Citation: For tracing the impact of new media on a fishing community of coastal Karnataka, against the backdrop of globalised business practices and growing communal tensions between Hindus and Muslims at the turn of the century.		
Best Feature Film in Malayalam	Ore Kadal	Producer: Vindhyan N. B. Director: Shyamaprasad	₹ 1,00,000/- Each
Best Feature Film in Malayalam	Citation: For a well crafted movie on the emotional conflict of a middle class housewife irresistibly drawn to a radical intellectual.		
Best Feature Film in Marathi	Nirop	Producer: Aparna Dharmadhikari; Director: Sachin Kundalkar	₹ 1,00,000/- Each
Best Feature Film in Marathi	Citation: For an original offbeat film that gives a fresh perspective of the internal landscapes of the human mind.		
Best Feature Film in Tamil	Periyar	Producer: M/s Liberty Creations Ltd. Director: Gnana Rajasekaran	₹ 1,00,000/- Each
Best Feature Film in Tamil	Citation: For a biographical feature which takes on issues like superstition, untouchability, widow remarriage etc by forcefully depicting the life of the great social reformer Shri E. V. Ramaswamy Naicker popularly known as Periyar.		

Best Feature Film in Each of the Language Other Than Those Specified In the Schedule VIII of the Constitution

Name of Award	Name of Film	Awardee(s)	Cash prize
Best Feature Film in English	The Last Lear	Producer: Arindam Chaudhuri; Director: Rituparno Ghosh	₹ 1,00,000/- Each
Best Feature Film in English	Citation: For a brilliant and visually stunning work of cinema on the life of a reclusive Shakespearian actor, well past his prime. His whimsical and passionate persona makes him a memorable and loveable character.		

=== Non-Feature Films ===
Films made in any Indian language shot on 16 mm, 35 mm or in a wider gauge or digital format and released on either film format or video/digital but certified by the Central Board of Film Certification as a documentary/newsreel/fiction are eligible for non-feature film section.

==== Juries ====
A committee headed by Ashoke Viswanathan was appointed to evaluate the non-feature films awards. Following were the jury members:

- Jury Members
  - Ashoke Viswanathan (Chairperson) • Prabhu Radhakrishnan • Rajendra Janglay • Jasmine K. Roy • Ashok Ogra • Ramesh Asher

==== Golden Lotus Award ====
Official name: Swarna Kamal

All the awardees are awarded with 'Golden Lotus Award (Swarna Kamal)', a certificate and cash prize.

Name of Award	Name of Film	Language	Awardee(s)	Cash prize
Best Non-Feature Film	Hope Dies Last In War	English and Hindi	Producer: Supriyo Sen; Director: Supriyo Sen	₹ 1,00,000/- Each
Best Non-Feature Film	Citation: For its sensitive albeit searching exploration of those in prisons in alien countries; a complex polyphony of variegated voices, the film is an endeavour to find hope in the midst of a struggle against despair.			
Best Non-Feature Film Direction	Vellapokathil	Malayalam	Jayaraj	₹ 50,000/- Each
Best Non-Feature Film Direction	Citation: For his minimalist portrayal of the traumatic tale of a faithful canine.			

==== Silver Lotus Award ====
Official name: Rajat Kamal

All the awardees are awarded with 'Silver Lotus Award (Rajat Kamal)' and cash prize.

Name of Award	Name of Film	Language	Awardee(s)	Cash prize
Best First Non-Feature Film	Lal Juto	Bengali	Producer: Satyajit Ray Film and Television Institute, Kolkata; Director: Shweta Merchant	₹ 75,000/- Each
Best First Non-Feature Film	Citation: For its conventional handling of a renowned literary text. The element of surprise is presented in an effortless manner, spontaneous and full of miraculous madness.			
Best Anthropological / Ethnographic Film	Tai Phakey	English	Producer: Priyam Chaliha; Director: Mridul Gupta	₹ 50,000/- Each
Best Anthropological / Ethnographic Film	Citation: For an honest portrayal of life and traditions of the minuscule Phakey community of the Northeast, which despite the influence of globalisation, continues to preserve its individual identity.			
Best Biographical Film and Best Historical Reconstruction/Compilation Film (Jointly given)	Antardhwani	Hindi	Producer: Films Division; Director: Jabbar Patel	₹ 50,000/- Each
Best Biographical Film and Best Historical Reconstruction/Compilation Film (Jointly given)	Citation: For creatively bringing out the life and times of Pandit Shiv Kumar Sharma in his journey to revive the lost music of the Santoor and place it on the world stage. The pace and rhythm of the film is in tune with the melodious music of the Santoor.			
Best Film on Environment / Conservation / Preservation	Bhanga Ghara	Bengali	Producer: Film and Television Institute of India; Director: Nilanjan Datta	₹ 50,000/- Each
Best Film on Environment / Conservation / Preservation	Citation: For championing the cause of environmental conservation. The film depicts the contrast between two regions of the Malda district as they come to terms with the inevitable flow of nature. While one faces the eroding onslaught of the river Ganga, the other renews itself to survive amidst the scarcity of water.			
Best Film on Social Issues	Bagher Bacha	Bengali	Producer: Satyajit Ray Film and Television Institute; Director: Bishnu Dev Halder	₹ 12,500/- Each
Best Film on Social Issues	Citation: For its spontaneous and multilayered depiction of the life of a child living in a railway station. He is shown on the borderline between a struggle for survival and a life of crime.			₹ 12,500/- Each
Best Film on Social Issues	Shifting Prophecy	English	Producer: Public Service Broadcasting Trust; Director: Merajur Rahman Baruah	₹ 12,500/- Each
Best Film on Social Issues	Citation: For handling the discrimination that Muslim women face in Tamil Nadu from some of the conservative clergy. The film successfully brings out the story of a woman activist who has galvanised the socially depressed women into fighting this gender discrimination.			₹ 12,500/- Each
Best Educational / Motivational / Instructional Film	Prarambha	Kannada	Producer: Santosh Sivan; Director: Santosh Sivan	₹ 50,000/- Each
Best Educational / Motivational / Instructional Film	Citation: For sensitively portraying the struggle faced by an HIV infected boy who is dismissed from school. The film takes a playful standpoint to inspire and instill a positive attitude towards this issue.			
Best Investigative Film	The Journalist And A Jihadi	English	Producer: Ramesh Sharma; Director: Ramesh Sharma and Ahmad Jamal	₹ 50,000/- Each
Best Investigative Film	Citation: For trying to uncover the sequence of events that led to the gruesome murder of the Wall-street journalist, Daniel Pearl. This film is very well researched and the investigation provides an insight into the working of a militant organisation.			
Best Short Fiction Film	Udedh Bun	Bhojpuri	Producer: Film and Television Institute of India; Director: Siddharth Sinha	₹ 50,000/- Each
Best Short Fiction Film	Citation: For creatively portraying a young boy's dilemma as he comes face to face with the temptations of life. The film evocatively explores the erotic under-currents in this coming of age tale.			
Best Film on Family Welfare	Making The Face	English	Producer: Public Service Broadcasting Trust; Director: Suvendu Chatterjee	₹ 50,000/- Each
Best Film on Family Welfare	Citation: For its multilayered exploration of the issue of alternative sexuality in a politically troubled state; celebrating this sexual orientation in a spontaneous manner, the film depicts it as a normal proclivity in a family setup. This, in no way, effects one's daily chores, particularly as the protagonist is a make-up artist of great acceptance.			
Best Cinematography	Kramasha	Hindi	Cameraman: Savita Singh	₹ 50,000/-
Best Cinematography	Citation: For her arresting use of lenses and lighting in the creation of a strange and magical world, full of a certain atmospheric dampness and mistiness, further enhanced by a consistent exhibition of striking cinematic compositions.			
Best Audiography	Kramasha	Hindi	Ajit Singh Rathore	₹ 50,000/-
Best Audiography	Citation: For the innovative sound design enhances the mood of the film and draws one into the magical ambience replete with fairy tales.			
Best Editing	Hope Dies Last In War	English and Hindi	Saikat Ray	₹ 50,000/-
Best Editing	Citation: For its creative blending of various elements of the past and present, as also for its seamless flow of images that evoke genuine emotions.			
Best Music Direction	Echoes Of Silence	English and Khasi	Zubeen Garg	₹ 50,000/-
Best Music Direction	Citation: For the emptiness of Pori's world is enhanced through the effective use of music, which is understated yet powerful, thus blending seamlessly into the narrative.			
Best Narration / Voice Over	Ayodhya Gatha	English and Hindi	Vani Subramanian	₹ 50,000/-
Best Narration / Voice Over	Citation: For the powerful and humane narration of Ayodhya Gatha weaves together the story of Ayodhya - its past, present and uncertain future - in a manner that touches you without overpowering you.			
Special Jury Award	Bhultir Khero	Bengali	• Amalan Datta (Producer) • Anirban Datta (Director)	₹ 12,500/- Each
Special Jury Award	Citation: For its brilliant evocation of Kolkata. The film brings out sights and sounds, smells and stories, myths and memories in a manner that is realistic and yet magical.			₹ 12,500/- Each
Special Jury Award	Poomaram	Malayalam	• Public Service Broadcasting Trust (Producer) • Vipin Vijay (Director)	₹ 12,500/- Each
Special Jury Award	Citation: For its creative use of visual craft to reflect on the relationship between menstrual rituals, the colour red and nature of human existence. The film engages the audience very deeply in its experimental exploration of the inner life of young women protagonists and their unique relationship with blood.			₹ 12,500/- Each

=== Best Writing on Cinema ===
The awards aim at encouraging study and appreciation of cinema as an art form and dissemination of information and critical appreciation of this art-form through publication of books, articles, reviews etc.

==== Juries ====
A committee headed by Namita Gokhale was appointed to evaluate the writing on Indian cinema. Following were the jury members:

- Jury Members
  - Namita Gokhale (Chairperson) • Jerry Pinto • G. P. Ramachandran

==== Golden Lotus Award ====
Official name: Swarna Kamal

All the awardees are awarded with 'Golden Lotus Award (Swarna Kamal)' and cash prize.

Name of Award	Name of Book	Language	Awardee(s)	Cash prize
Best Book on Cinema	From Raj to Swaraj: The Non-fiction Film In India	English	Author: B. D. Garga; Publisher: Penguin Books India Pvt. Ltd.	₹ 75,000/- Each
Best Book on Cinema	Citation: For its engaged and illuminating study of non-feature cinema in its social, political and cultural context.			
Best Film Critic		Malayalam	V. K. Joseph	₹ 75,000/-
Best Film Critic	Citation: For his intellectual and aesthetic integrity in writing about regional, national and world cinema.			

=== Awards not given ===
Following were the awards not given as no film was found to be suitable for the award:

- Best Scientific Film
- Best Arts / Cultural Film
- Best Environment Film Including Agriculture
- Best Promotional Film
- Best Agricultural Film
- Best Non-Feature Animation Film
- Best Feature Film in Assamese
- Best Feature Film in Manipuri
- Best Feature Film in Oriya
- Best Feature Film in Punjabi
- Best Feature Film in Telugu
- Best Exploration / Adventure Film
