= List of Indian film music directors =

The following are notable Indian film music directors:

Music director	Language
Aadesh Shrivastava	Hindi, Bengali
Aby Tom Cyriac	Malayalam
Abhimann Roy	Kannada, Telugu
Achu Rajamani	Tamil, Malayalam
Adnan Sami	Hindi
Ajay–Atul	Hindi, Marathi, Tamil, Telugu, Kannada, Sanskrit
Ajay Srivastava	Bhojpuri
Amaal Mallik	Hindi, Tamil, Telugu
Amit Trivedi	Hindi, Marathi, Telugu, Tamil
Anand Raj Anand	Hindi
Anand–Milind	Hindi
Anand Modak	Marathi
Anil Biswas	Hindi, Bengali
Anil Mohile	Marathi
Anirudh Ravichander	Tamil, Telugu, Hindi
Ankit Tiwari	Hindi
Anup Rubens	Telugu
Anoop Seelin	Kannada
Anu Malik	Hindi, Bengali, Kannada
Arjuna Harjai	Hindi, Bengali, Punjabi
Arjun Janya	Kannada
A. R. Rahman	Tamil, Hindi, Bengali, Marathi, Telugu, Punjabi, Malayalam, Kannada, English, Gujarati, Mandarin, Japanese, Persian, Arabic
A. R. Reihana	Tamil, Kannada
Aruldev	Tamil, Telugu, Malayalam, Kannada
Arun Paudwal	Hindi, Marathi
Ashok Bhatt	Gujarati
Ashok Ghosh	Hindi, Bengali
Ashok Patki	Marathi, Konkani
Avadhoot Gupte	Marathi
Avinash Vyas	Hindi, Gujarati
Baba Sehgal	Hindi
Bappi Lahiri	Hindi, Bengali, Tamil, Kannada, Telugu
B Ajaneesh Loknath	Kannada, Tamil
Berny-Ignatius	Malayalam
Bennet–Veetraag	Malayalam
Bharadwaj	Tamil, Telugu
Bhaskar Chandavarkar	Marathi, Kannada, Hindi
Bhavesh Bhatt	Hindi, Tamil, Marathi, English, Punjabi
Bhavatharini	Tamil
Bheems Ceciroleo	Telugu
Bhupen Hazarika	Hindi, Bengali, Assamese
Bijibal	Malayalam
Bulo C Rani	Hindi
C. R. Subbaraman	Tamil, Telugu, Hindi
C. Ramchandra	Hindi, Marathi, Telugu
Chaitan Bharadwaj	Telugu
Chakri	Telugu, Kannada
Chandrabose	Tamil
Chitragupta	Hindi
Chirrantan Bhatt	Hindi, Telugu
C. Ashwath	Kannada
Chowdiah	Kannada, Tamil
Chaitra HG	Kannada
Colonial Cousins	Hindi, Tamil
Daboo Malik	Hindi
Damodar Raao	Bhojpuri, Hindi, Marathi
Datta Davjekar	Marathi, Hindi
Datta Naik	Marathi, Hindi
Dattaram Wadkar	Hindi, Marathi
Debojyoti Mishra	Hindi, Bengali
Deva	Tamil
Devan Ekambaram	Tamil
Devi Sri Prasad	Telugu, Tamil, Hindi
Deepak Dev	Malayalam, Tamil
Dharan	Tamil
Dhina	Tamil
Dharma Vish	Kannada, Hindi
Emani Sankara Sastry	Hindi, Telugu
Ghulam Mohammed	Hindi
G. K. Venkatesh	Kannada, Malayalam, Tamil, Telugu
G. Devarajan	Malayalam, Tamil, Telugu, Kannada
Gangai Amaran	Tamil, Telugu, Kannada, Malayalam
Gopi Sunder	Malayalam, Telugu, Tamil, Hindi
Ghantasala	Telugu, Tamil, Kannada
Gali Penchala Narasimha Rao	Telugu
Ghibran	Tamil, Telugu, Malayalam
Gurukiran	Kannada, Telugu
G. V. Prakash Kumar	Tamil, Telugu, Kannada
Hamsalekha	Kannada, Tamil, Telugu
Hansraj Behl	Hindi, Punjabi
Harris Jayaraj	Tamil, Telugu, Hindi
Hesham Abdul Wahab	Malayam, Telugu
Hemanta Kumar Mukhopadhyay	Bengali, Hindi
Himesh Reshammiya	Hindi, Gujarati, Tamil, Telugu, Marathi, English
Hridaynath Mangeshkar	Hindi, Marathi
Hiphop Tamizha	Tamil, Telugu
Husnlal Bhagatram	Hindi
Ishaan Dev	Malayalam, Tamil, Kannada
Ilayaraja	Tamil, Telugu, Hindi, Sanskrit, Malayalam, Kannada, English, Marathi
Iqbal Qureshi	Hindi
Ismail Darbar	Hindi
Imman	Tamil, Telugu, Kannada
Jagjit Singh	Hindi, Urdu, Punjabi
Jaidev	Hindi
James Vasanthan	Tamil
Jassie Gift	Malayalam, Tamil, Kannada, Telugu
Jatin–Lalit	Hindi, Bengali, Telugu
Jeet Ganguly	Hindi, Bengali
Jerry Amaldev	Malayalam
Johnson	Malayalam, Tamil
Joshua Sridhar	Malayalam, Tamil, Kannada, Telugu
Jubair Muhammed	Malayalam
Justin Prabhakaran	Tamil, Telugu, Malayalam
Joy Sarkar	Bengali
J. V. Raghavulu	Telugu
Kabir Suman	Bengali
K. V. Mahadevan	Tamil, Telugu
K. Chakravarthy	Kannada, Telugu
K	Tamil, Telugu, Malayalam
K. Kalyan	Kannada
Kailash-Naresh-Paresh	Hindi
Kalyanji-Anandji	Hindi, Gujarati
Kanu Roy	Hindi, Bengali
Kannur Rajan	Malayalam
Karthik	Tamil
Karthikeya Murthy	Tamil, Telugu
Karthik Raja	Tamil, Kannada
Kelkar	Marathi, Telugu
Komanduri Ramachari	Telugu
K. Prasada Rao	Telugu
Krishnarao Phulambrikar	Hindi, Marathi
Kunnakudi Vaidyanathan	Tamil
Khayyam	Hindi
Khemchand Prakash	Hindi
Khwaja Khurshid Anwar	Hindi, Urdu
Kishore Kumar	Hindi, Bengali
Kumar Sanu	Hindi, Bengali
Kunnakudi Vaidyanathan	Tamil
Lalit Pandit	Hindi
Laxmikant–Pyarelal	Hindi, Telugu
Lesle Lewis	Hindi, Marathi
Lata Mangeshkar	Marathi as Anandghan
L. Vaidyanathan	Tamil, Kannada, Telugu, Malayalam
Madan Mohan	Hindi
Mahesh-Naresh	Gujarati, Hindi
Mahati Swara Sagar	Telugu
Master Venu	Telugu, Tamil
M. S. Viswanathan	Hindi, Tamil, Malayalam, Telugu
M. Ranga Rao	Kannada
M. M. Keeravani	Telugu, Tamil, Hindi, Kannada, Malayalam
Mani Sharma	Telugu, Tamil
Madhavapeddi Suresh	Telugu
Manikanth Kadri	Kannada, Tamil
Mano Murthy	Kannada
Manoj George	Kannada, Malayalam, Hindi
Meet Bros	Hindi, Punjabi
Mejo Joseph	Malayalam
M. G. Radhakrishnan	Malayalam, Tamil
M. G. Sreekumar	Malayalam, Tamil
Mickey J Meyer	Telugu
Mithoon Sharma	Hindi
M.Janardhan	Telugu
M. Jayachandran	Malayalam, Tamil
M. M. Srilekha	Telugu
Monty Sharma	Hindi
M. S. Baburaj	Malayalam
M. Venkataraju	Kannada, Tamil
Nadeem–Shravan	Hindi
Naushad Ali	Hindi, Bhojpuri, Malayalam
Neeta Sen	Bengali
Nilesh Moharir	Marathi
Nitz 'N' Sony	Hindi
Nitesh Tiwari	Hindi
Nusrat Fateh Ali Khan	Hindi
O. P. Nayyar	Hindi, Telugu
Ouseppachan	Malayalam, Tamil
P. Adinarayana Rao	Telugu, Tamil, Hindi
Pankaj Mullick	Hindi, Bengali
Pannalal Ghosh	Hindi, Bengali
Papanasam Sivan	Tamil, Kannada
Pendyala Nageswara Rao	Telugu, Tamil
Perumbavoor G. Raveendranath	Malayalam
P. Kalinga Rao	Kannada
Piyush Mishra	Hindi
Prashanth R Vihari	Telugu
Prashant Pillai	Hindi, Malayalam
Pravin Mani	Tamil, Telugu
Praveen D Rao	Kannada
Prem Dhawan	Hindi, Punjabi
Prem Anand	Odia, Hindi, Marathi, Bengali
Premgi Amaren	Tamil
Pritam Chakraborty	Hindi, Bengali
P. Bhanumathi	Telugu, Tamil
P. V. R. Raja	Telugu, Hindi
Raichand Boral	Hindi, Bengali
Raj Kamal	Hindi
Ravi	Hindi, Malayalam
Rahul Dev Burman	Hindi, Bengali, Tamil, Telugu, Oriya, Marathi, English
R. Sudarsanam	Tamil, Kannada, Telugu, Hindi, Malayalam
Raghu Dixit	Kannada
Rahul Raj	Telugu, Malayalam
Raj–Koti	Telugu, Tamil, Kannada
Raju Singh	Hindi, Punjabi
Rajan–Nagendra	Kannada, Telugu
Rajesh Ramanath	Kannada
Rajesh Roshan	Hindi, Bengali
Rajkumar R. Pandey	Bhojpuri
Rajnish Mishra	Bhojpuri
Ram Kadam	Marathi
Ram Sampath	Hindi
Raamlaxman	Marathi, Hindi
Ram Miriyala	Telugu
R. P. Patnaik	Telugu, Kannada, Tamil, Hindi
Ramana Gogula	Telugu, Tamil, Kannada
Ramesh Naidu	Telugu
Ranjit Barot	Hindi
Raveendran	Malayalam, Tamil
Ravi Basrur	Kannada, Telugu, Tamil, Malayalam, Hindi.
Ravindra Jain	Hindi, Telugu
Ricky Kej	Malayalam, Kannada
Rohan-Rohan	Hindi, Marathi
Roop Kumar Rathod	Hindi, Bengali
Roshan	Hindi
Sachin–Jigar	Hindi, Gujarati
Sadhu Kokila	Kannada
Sajid–Wajid	Hindi
Salil Chowdhury	Hindi, Bengali, Tamil, Telugu, Kannada, Malayalam
Saleel Kulkarni	Marathi
Salim–Sulaiman	Hindi, Tamil, Telugu
Sanjib Sarkar	Hindi, Bengali, Oriya, English & Devotional
Sandesh Shandilya	Hindi
Sandeep Chowta	Hindi, Telugu
Sangeet-Siddharth	Hindi, Marathi
Sanjay Leela Bhansali	Hindi
Sanjeev–Darshan	Hindi
Santosh Mishra	Hindi, Bhojpuri, Gujarati
Sapan-Jagmohan	Hindi, Bengali
S. A. Rajkumar	Tamil, Telugu, Kannada
Sardar Malik	Hindi
Sardul Singh Kwatra	Hindi
Satyam	Kannada, Malayalam, Tamil, Telugu
S. D. Burman	Hindi, Bengali
Shankar–Ganesh	Tamil, Kannada, Telugu
Shanti Kumar Desai	Hindi, Gujarati
Shankar–Ehsaan–Loy	Hindi, Marathi, Tamil, Bengali, Telugu, English
Shankar Mahadevan	Tamil, Marathi, Hindi
Shankar–Jaikishan	Hindi, Bengali, Telugu
Shiv–Hari	Hindi
S. Hanumantha Rao	Telugu
Shantanu Moitra	Hindi, Bengali
Sharreth	Malayalam, Tamil, Telugu
Shashwat Sachdev	Hindi
Shyam	Malayalam, Tamil
Shruti Haasan	Tamil, Telugu
Simon K. King	Tamil, Telugu
S. M. Subbaiah Naidu	Tamil, Malayalam, Telugu
S. N. Tripathi	Hindi
S. Narayan	Kannada
Snehal Bhatkar	Hindi, Marathi
Sneha Khanwalkar	Hindi
Sohail Sen	Hindi, Bengali
S. P. Balasubrahmanyam	Telugu, Kannada, Tamil
S. P. Kodandapani	Telugu, Tamil, Kannada
S. P. Venkatesh	Kannada, Tamil, Telugu, Malayalam
Salur Rajeswara Rao	Telugu, Tamil, Kannada
Srinivas	Tamil
Srikanth Deva	Tamil
Sri	Telugu
Snehal Bhatkar	Hindi, Marathi
Sajjad Hussain	Hindi
Sudhir Phadke	Hindi, Marathi
Sushin Shyam	Malayalam
Susarla Dakshinamurthi	Telugu, Tamil
S. V. Krishna Reddy	Telugu
Santhosh Narayanan	Tamil, Telugu
Sweekar Agasthi	Telugu
Selvaganesh	Tamil, Kannada
Thaman S	Telugu, Tamil, Kannada
T. Chalapathi Rao	Telugu
T. V. Raju	Telugu
T. G. Lingappa	Kannada, Tamil, Telugu
T. K. Ramamoorthy	Tamil, Telugu
Upendra Kumar	Kannada
Usha Khanna	Hindi
Uttam Singh	Hindi, Tamil
Usha Khanna	Hindi
Vandemataram Srinivas	Telugu
Vani Harikrishna	Kannada
Vanraj Bhatia	Hindi
Varun Unni	Malayalam
Vasant Desai	Hindi, Marathi
V. Dakshinamoorthy	Malayalam, Tamil
Vasant Desai	Marathi, Hindi
V. Harikrishna	Kannada, Telugu
Vidyasagar	Tamil, Telugu, Malayalam
Vijai Bulganin	Telugu
Vijay Antony	Tamil, Telugu
Vijay Prakash	Tamil, Kannada
Vijaya Bhaskar	Kannada
Viju Shah	Hindi, Gujarati
Vikram Montrose	Hindi
Vishal Bhardwaj	Hindi
Vivek Sagar	Telugu
Vishal Mishra	Hindi, Marathi, Tamil, Telugu
Vishal–Shekhar	Hindi, Marathi, Telugu
Viswajith	Malayalam, Kannada, Marathi, English
V. Kumar	Tamil
V. Manohar	Kannada
V. Nagayya	Telugu
V. Ravichandran	Kannada
Yashwant Dev	Hindi, Marathi
Yuvan Shankar Raja	Tamil, Telugu, Kannada, English
Honey Singh	Punjabi
Zakir Hussain	Independent
Zubeen Garg	Assamese, Bengali, Hindi, Tamil, English
