= Shatrughan Mahto =

Indian politician

Member of the Jharkhand Legislative Assembly

Shatrughan Mahto (born 1971) is an Indian politician from Jharkhand. He is a member of the Jharkhand Legislative Assembly from Baghmara Assembly constituency in Dhanbad district. He won the 2024 Jharkhand Legislative Assembly election, representing the Bharatiya Janata Party.

== Early life and education ==
Mahto is from Baghmara, Dhanbad district, Jharkhand. He is the son of late Puna Mahto. He studied intermediate (Class 12) in arts at Katrash College, Katras, Bihar and in 1992 passed the examinations conducted by the Intermediate Education Council, Patna. He is a former employee of Bharat Coking Coal Limited. Mahto is elder brother of current Dhanbad MP Dulu Mahto.

== Career ==
Mahto won from Baghmara Assembly constituency representing Bharatiya Janata Party in the 2024 Jharkhand Legislative Assembly election. He polled 87,529 votes and defeated his nearest rival, Jaleshwar Mahato of the Indian National Congress, by a margin of 18,682 votes.
