= Jaan Tere Naam (2012 film) =

2012 Bhojpuri film

- Directed by: Ramakant Prasad
- Starring: Khesari Lal Yadav; Viraj Bhatt; Tanushree Chatterjee
- Release date: 6 April 2012
- Country: India
- Language: Bhojpuri

Jaan Tere Naam is a 2012 Bhojpuri Film directed by Ramakant Prasad, which features Khesari Lal Yadav, Tanushree Chatterjee and Viraj Bhatt in lead roles. The film is based on the mockery of Lavanda Naach performers and shows the prevalent idea of Heteronormativity in the society.

== Cast ==
- Khesari Lal Yadav as Kishan
- Viraj Bhatt
- Tanushree Chatterjee

== Plot ==
A village lad, who wants to be an actor, performs a Lavanda Naach at a wedding, after which his father calls him a Namard (not a man), and throws him out of his house. After the incident, his masculinity was also questioned due to cross dressing as a woman. He goes to Mumbai and becomes the biggest Bhojpuri film star.

== Soundtrack ==
- "Dharat Nahi Sejiya" by Indu Sonali
- "Suna Sanam Khus Bani Hum" by Udit Narayan, Tripti Shakya
- "Lagta Garamiya" by Khesari Lal Yadav, Khusbhu Jain
- "Umar Baye 18 Saal" by Khesari Lal Yadav, Khusbhu Jain, Tripti Shakya
- "Chadhal Jawaniya" by Indu Sonali
- "Chalelu Bhachkat" by Khesari Lal Yadav, Indu Sonali
- "Mora Lagiya Jawaniya Ke" by Khesari Lal Yadav
- "Aekar Deewana" by Khesari Lal Yadav
- "UP Ke Loot" by Khushbu Jain

== Reception ==
=== Scholarly response ===
Akshaya Kumar, in one of his articles, writes that "the film sets in motion a dialogue about cultural practices that defy the feudal family and awaken its ‘deviant’ anxieties". At the same time, he discard the film as a challenge to the established idea of Heteronormativity, as the climax of the film reduces it to a familial matter, where the protagonist (Khesari Lal Yadav), gives an interview after becoming a superstar, and barely challenges any idea of Heteronormativity. Kumar, calls the climax as the triumph of Patriarchal order. At the same time, he believes that despite an affiliation with familial honour, Khesari has "introduced a discomforting force in the narrative frame".
