= Baghmara, Jharkhand Assembly constituency =

Constituency of the Jharkhand legislative assembly in India

Coordinates: 25.20°N 90.63°E

Baghmara
- Constituency No. 43 for the Jharkhand Legislative Assembly

Constituency details
- Country: India
- Region: East India
- State: Jharkhand
- District: Dhanbad
- Lok Sabha constituency: Giridih
- Established: 2000
- Total electors: 2,85,966
- Reservation: None

Member of Legislative Assembly
- 5th Jharkhand Legislative Assembly
- Incumbent Shatrughan Mahto
- Party: BJP
- Elected year: 2024

Baghmara is an Legislative assembly constituency in the Indian state of Jharkhand.

Baghmara is a Vidhan Sabha constituency, in the Dhanbad district of Jharkhand. Baghamara is known for the rich coal contents underground and a number of coal mines of B.C.C.L. It is a B.C.C.L. township and very close to nature with much greenery, counteracting the pollution of the remainder of the district.

== Members of the Legislative Assembly ==
Election	Member	Party
Bihar Legislative Assembly
Before 1967: Constituency did not exist
1967	M. M. Singh	Jan Kranti Dal
1969	Imamul Hal Khan	Samyukta Socialist Party
1972	Imamul Hal Khan	Indian National Congress
1977	Shankar Dayal Singh	Indian National Congress
1980	Shankar Dayal Singh	Indian National Congress
1985	Om Prakash Lal	Indian National Congress
1990	Om Prakash Lal	Indian National Congress
1995	Om Prakash Lal	Indian National Congress
2000	Jaleshwar Mahato	Samata Party
Jharkhand Legislative Assembly
2005	Jaleshwar Mahato	Janata Dal (United)
2009	Dulu Mahato	Jharkhand Vikas Morcha
2014	Dulu Mahato	Bharatiya Janata Party
2019	Dulu Mahato	Bharatiya Janata Party
2024	Shatrughan Mahto	Bharatiya Janata Party

== Election results ==
=== Assembly election 2024 ===
2024 Jharkhand Legislative Assembly election: Baghmara
Party	Candidate	Votes	%	±%
BJP	Shatrughan Mahto	87,529	43.85%	▲0.14
INC	Jaleshwar Mahato	68,847	34.49%	▼8.76
Independent	Rohit Yadav	18,314	9.17%	New
JLKM	Deepak Kumar Rawani	15,696	7.86%	New
SP	Suraj Mahato	2,572	1.29%	New
Independent	Vishal Balmiki	1,572	0.79%	New
NOTA	None of the Above	2,953	1.48%	▲0.65
Margin of victory		18,682	9.36%	▲8.90
Turnout		1,99,623	67.58%	▲4.94
Registered electors		2,95,391		▲3.30
BJP hold		Swing	▲0.14	

=== Assembly election 2019 ===
2019 Jharkhand Legislative Assembly election: Baghmara
Party	Candidate	Votes	%	±%
BJP	Dulu Mahato	78,291	43.71%	▼7.94
INC	Jaleshwar Mahato	77,467	43.25%	New
JD(U)	Subhash Ray	6,528	3.64%	▼30.34
Independent	Binayak Kumar Gupta	3,527	1.97%	New
JVM(P)	Santosh Kumar Mahato	3,264	1.82%	▲0.23
BSP	Kanhai Singh	2,073	1.16%	New
Independent	Rajesh Kumar Swarnakar	1,881	1.05%	New
NOTA	None of the Above	1,491	0.83%	▼0.23
Margin of victory		824	0.46%	▼17.21
Turnout		1,79,134	62.64%	▼1.85
Registered electors		2,85,966		▲9.99
BJP hold		Swing	▼7.94	

=== Assembly election 2014 ===
2014 Jharkhand Legislative Assembly election: Baghmara
Party	Candidate	Votes	%	±%
BJP	Dulu Mahato	86,603	51.65%	New
JD(U)	Jaleshwar Mahato	56,980	33.98%	▲7.95
JMM	Suraj Mahato	8,053	4.80%	▼0.31
JVM(P)	Sitaram Bhuia	2,670	1.59%	▼38.84
CPI	Sanjeev Kumar Mahato	1,804	1.08%	New
MCC	Abdul Jabbar Ansari	1,724	1.03%	New
SP	Shankar Beldar	1,421	0.85%	New
NOTA	None of the Above	1,781	1.06%	New
Margin of victory		29,623	17.67%	▲3.26
Turnout		1,67,679	64.49%	▲9.18
Registered electors		2,60,002		▲3.79
BJP gain from JVM(P)		Swing	▲11.21	

=== Assembly election 2009 ===
2009 Jharkhand Legislative Assembly election: Baghmara
Party	Candidate	Votes	%	±%
JVM(P)	Dulu Mahato	56,026	40.44%	New
JD(U)	Jaleshwar Mahato	36,066	26.03%	▼10.82
INC	Om Prakash Lal	27,889	20.13%	▼9.75
JMM	Akshay Lal Chouhan	7,077	5.11%	New
Independent	Gourchand Bauri	3,128	2.26%	New
RJD	Vikram Prasad Yadav	1,583	1.14%	▼0.66
Independent	Ritesh Kumar Agrawal	1,218	0.88%	New
Margin of victory		19,960	14.41%	▲7.44
Turnout		1,38,554	55.31%	▼3.07
Registered electors		2,50,496		▼0.57
JVM(P) gain from JD(U)		Swing	▲3.58	

=== Assembly election 2005 ===
2005 Jharkhand Legislative Assembly election: Baghmara
Party	Candidate	Votes	%	±%
JD(U)	Jaleshwar Mahato	54,206	36.85%	New
INC	Om Prakash Lal	43,955	29.88%	▼9.40
Jharkhand Vananchal Congress	Dulu Mahato	25,132	17.09%	New
RJD	Rakesh Kumar Mahto	2,649	1.80%	▼6.00
LJP	Rakesh Kumar Singh	2,123	1.44%	New
MCC	Saraswati Devi	1,903	1.29%	▼0.54
BSP	Rajiv Tiwari	1,843	1.25%	▼1.00
Margin of victory		10,251	6.97%	▲3.70
Turnout		1,47,089	58.39%	▼0.82
Registered electors		2,51,924		▲23.53
JD(U) gain from SAP		Swing	▼5.71	

=== Assembly election 2000 ===
2000 Bihar Legislative Assembly election: Baghmara
Party	Candidate	Votes	%	±%
SAP	Jaleshwar Mahato	51,391	42.56%	New
INC	Om Prakash Lal	47,438	39.29%	New
RJD	Sukhdeo Bidrohi	9,414	7.80%	New
BSP	Saryu Ram	2,715	2.25%	New
JMM	Mansu Prasad Mahato	2,611	2.16%	New
MCC	Haldhar Mahato	2,213	1.83%	New
Samajwadi Jan Parishad	Duryodhan Rawani	1,479	1.22%	New
Margin of victory		3,953	3.27%	
Turnout		1,20,749	60.02%	
Registered electors		2,03,936		
SAP win (new seat)				

== See also ==
- List of constituencies of the Jharkhand Legislative Assembly
- Dhanbad district
