= RCMS =

RCMS may refer to:

- Rachel Carson Middle School, Virginia, United States
- Radio Colony Model School, a school in Dhaka, Bangladesh
- Rastriya Colliery Majdoor Sangh, Indian trade union
- Research Center for Modeling and Simulation, Pakistan
- Rowan County Middle School, a middle school in Morehead, Kentucky
- Royal Canadian Medical Service
