= Kharvas (film) =

Indian Marathi language short drama film

- Film poster
- Directed by: Aditya Suhas Jambhale
- Written by: Dr. Smita Jambhale
- Produced by: Shubhang Borkar; Madhukar Joshi
- Starring: Veena Jamkar; Sandesh Kulkarni; Swati Bowalekar
- Cinematography: Ravi Ranjan
- Edited by: Amogh Barve; Aditya Suhas Jambhale
- Music by: Susmit Limaye
- Production company: Shree Mahalasa Productions Ponda
- Release date: 2018
- Running time: 38 min
- Country: India
- Language: Marathi

Kharvas is a 2018 Indian Marathi-language short drama film directed by Aditya Suhas Jambhale and written by Smita Jambhale. The film stars Veena Jamkar, Sandesh Kulkarni, and Swati Bowalekar and recounts the story of a woman who faces physical and emotional challenges after having delivered a stillborn child. In 2018, the film was selected to be screened at International Film Festival of India which was held in Panaji on 20 November 2018. In 2019, the film won the National Film Awards for Best Short Fiction Film.

== Plot ==
The film is 38 minutes long produced by Shubhang Borkar, that follows Asawari (Veena Jamkar) who has lost her baby in a stillbirth and is going through physical, emotional, and societal ramifications of the tragedy. She quits her painting career and starts back to her ancestral home in a remote Konkan village to overcome her trauma.

== Screening ==
The film was selected as the opening non feature film at the Indian Panorama, at 49th International Film Festival of India (IFFI) and was awarded the National Film Award for Best Short Fiction Film in 2019.

== Reception ==
Suparna Thombare of Cinestaan wrote "The screenplay, though, is tight and poignant, aided by Jamkar's dramatic performance. A well-shot climax packs in all the action, becoming a great lead-in to a hopeful conclusion — life goes on and the smiles will be back, but the process of grieving is equally important."

== Accolades ==
Year	Ceremony	Category	Result	Ref.
2018	66th National Film Awards	Best Short Fiction Film	Won	
