= Ganga Maiyya Tohe Piyari Chadhaibo =

Ganga Maiya Tohe Piyari Chadhaibo
- Directed by: Kundan Kumar
- Screenplay by: Nazir Hussain
- Story by: Nazir Hussain
- Produced by: Bishwanath Prasad Shahabadi and Jai Narayan Lal
- Starring: Kumkum; Ashim Kumar; Nazir Hussain; Tiwari
- Cinematography: R. K. Pandit
- Edited by: Kamalakar
- Music by: Chitragupta; Shailendra
- Release date: 5 February 1962 (Benares)
- Running time: 120 min.
- Country: India
- Language: Bhojpuri
- Budget: ₹5 lakh (equivalent to ₹4 Crore or US$500,000 in 2022)
- Box office: ₹75 lakh

Ganga Maiyya Tohe Piyari Chadhaibo is a Bhojpuri film released in 1962 directed by Kundan Kumar. It was the first-ever Bhojpuri film, and starred Kumkum, Ashim Kumar and Nazir Hussain. It had music by Chitragupta, lyrics by Shailendra and songs sung by Lata Mangeshkar and Mohammad Rafi. The film is based on author Acharya Shivpujan Sahay's short story Kahani Ka Plot.

Ganga Maiyya Tohe Piyari Chadhaibo was released on 5 February 1962 at Prakash Talkies, Benares. The film was directed by Kundan Kumar and produced by Bishwanath Prasad Shahabadi and his partner Jai Narayan Lal on behest of the first president of India, Dr. Rajendra Prasad, with initial budget of Rs.150,000 eventually ending up at approximately 500,000. It was shown to Desh Ratna Dr. Rajendra Prasad at a special screening organized at Sadaqat Ashram, Patna before its release.

The theme is based on widow remarriage.

== Plot ==
Shyam is a wealthy boy who falls in love with a poor girl named Sumitri. The boy's father, a moneylender, demands a dowry, but the boy objects. In response, the father says, "I invested in your education and raised your value, so why shouldn't I take the dowry?" Unable to marry the girl he loves, Shyam leaves home. Meanwhile, Sumitri is forced to marry a sixty-year-old man. The groom dies before consummating the marriage. After becoming a young widow, she is mistreated by her in-laws. She attempts suicide but survives, ultimately becoming a dancing girl. Shyam eventually finds her and marries her.

== Cast ==
- Kumkum
- Jagannath Shukla (Jaggi Baba)
- Ashim Kumar as Shyam
- Nazir Hussain
- Ramayan Tiwari
- Helen
- Padma Khanna
- Sujit Kumar
- Leela Mishra
- Tun Tun
- Bhagwan Sinha

== Soundtrack ==
Ganga Maiyya Tohe Piyari Chadhaibo has music by Chitragupta, with lyrics by Shailendra.

- "Ganga Maiyya Tohe Piyari Chadhaibo" - Lata Mangeshkar, Usha Mangeshkar
- "Sonwa Ke Pinjra Mein" - Mohammed Rafi
- "More Karejwa Men Pir " - Lata Mangeshkar, Usha Mangeshkar
- "Kahe Bansuria Bajaile" (Happy) - Lata Mangeshkar
- "Ab To Lagat Mora Solvwa Saal" - Suman Kalyanpur
- " Luk Chuk Badra" - Lata Mangeshkar
- "Kahe Bansuria Bajaile" (Sad) - Lata Mangeshkar

== Production ==
=== Development ===
At an award function in Mumbai in the late 1950s, character actor Nazir Hussain met then president Dr. Rajendra Prasad, who also belonged to Bihar. During their conversation Prasad asked Hussain, "Why don't you make films in Bhojpuri?" The conversation inspired Hussain. He had already written the screenplay of the Ganga Maiyya Tohe Piyari Chadhaibo, meaning "Ganges Mother I will offer you the auspicious yellow sari" (if my wishes come true) and had first given it to Bimal Roy, with whom he had worked in Devdas (1955).

In a chance encounter, Hussain met Bishwanath Prasad Shahabadi, a businessman from Arrah in Bihar, at a film studio in Bombay. Shahbad, owned cinema halls in Dhanbad and Giridih. When Hussain narrated the story to Shahabadi, Alongside his partner Jai Narayan Lal, they both agreed to produce the film. Shahabadi and Lal immediately agreed to finance the film at ₹1.5 lakh (US$1,600), though eventually it cost ₹5 lakh (US$5,300). Kundan Kumar, who hailed from Varanasi, and had made the film Bade Ghar Ki Bahu (1960) with Geeta Bali and Abhi Bhattacharya was chosen.

=== Filming ===
The muhurat shot was shot at Shaheed Smarak (Martyr's Memorial) in Patna on 16 February 1961. The shooting formally started the next day. The film was mostly shot in Maner, a small town 30 km west of Patna and pilgrimage town of Varanasi. It has sequences shot at Gol Ghar in Patna and Arrah railway station.

== Release and reception ==
At the First Bhojpuri Film Awards for Bhojpuri and Magadhi films, organized by the Bhojpuri Film Samaroh Samiti and held on 27 April 1965, at Ananda Bazar Patrika Bhawan, Calcutta, Ganga Maiyya Tohe Piyari Chadhaibo won numerous awards, including Best Film, Best Actress (Kum Kum), Best Supporting Actor (Nazir Hussain), Best Lyrics (Shailendra), Best Story (Nazir Hussain) and Best Playback Singer - Male (Mohammed Rafi - "Sonwa Ke Pinjre mein").

== Legacy ==
In 2011, it was shown during 99th Bihar Divas (Bihar Day) celebrations.
