= Sasural (1984 film) =

1984 film directed by Govind Moonis

- Directed by: Govind Moonis
- Story by: Govind Moonis
- Produced by: Bishwanath Prasad Shahabadi
- Starring: Arun Govil; Bharat Bhushan; Dina Pathak; Arvind Deshpande; Gulshan Grover; Sadhana Singh
- Cinematography: K. R. Murthy
- Edited by: V. N. Mayekar
- Music by: Ravindra Jain
- Release date: 1984
- Country: India
- Language: Hindi

Sasural is a 1984 Hindi movie produced by Biswanath Prasad Shahabadi and directed by Govind Moonis. The film stars Arun Govil, Bharat Bhushan, Arvind Deshpande, Gulshan Grover, Sadhana Singh and Dina Pathak.

== Plot ==
Chanda (Sadhana Singh) had never known her parents. She had never experienced a mother's love and care, nor the joys of a happy family. She is treated badly by her Aunt who took her in when she was orphaned. Chanda experiences sympathy, love and a sense of belonging for the first time when she meets Narendra (Arun Govil). They marry and Chanda finally gets the love and affection of a family. However, her Aunt Jagdamba is not happy with the marriage as she wanted her daughter, Deepa (Sukhjeet Kaur) to marry Narendra. She tells and blackmails Chanda, that her mother died of Leprosy and so she must be a carrier of the disease too.

== Cast ==
- Arun Govil - Narendra Sharma
- Sadhana Singh - Chanda
- Sukhjeet Kaur - Deepa
- Bharat Bhushan - Ram Sahay
- Shammi - Jagdamba
- Dina Pathak - Narendra's mother
- Arvind Deshpande - Advocate Shivshankar Sharma
- Gulshan Grover - Bansi
- Manjushree - Nirmala
- Mushtaq Khan - Pratap
- Paidi Jairaj - Doctor
- Manmauji - Bhola (as Manmaujee)
- Lalita Kumari

== Songs ==
All Lyrics were written by Ravindra Jain who was also the music director for the film.

1. "Aaj Main Bahut Khush Hu" - Kishore Kumar, Sadhana Singh

2. "Na Jane Kab Kaise" - Kishore Kumar, Hemalata

3. "Sun Sun Gaon Ki Gori" - Yesudas

4. "Chahe Koi Hath Jode" - Aarti Mukherjee, Hemalata

5. "Bhabhi O Bhabhi" - Aarti Mukherjee, Dilraj Kaur

6. "Yadukul Raghav" - Hemalata
