= Lachhminiya =

Indian film

- Directed by: Ritesh S Kumar
- Written by: Vishal Pandey, Divyanshu Mishra
- Screenplay by: Ritesh S Kumar
- Produced by: Ajitabh Tiwari
- Starring: Tanushree Chatterjee, Sintu Singh Sagar
- Cinematography: Badal Mani
- Edited by: Arjun Markaba
- Music by: Sanjay Tiwari
- Production company: Filmeniya Film Factory
- Release date: 2024
- Country: India
- Language: Hindi

Lachhminiya is a 2024 Indian Hindi film, which is directed by Ritesh S Kumar and produced by Ajitabh Tiwari.
