= Rootha Na Karo =

- Release Poster
- Directed by: Sunder Dar
- Produced by: Bishwanath Prasad Shahabadi
- Starring: Shashi Kapoor; Nanda
- Music by: C. Ramchandra
- Release date: 31 December 1969
- Running time: 146 minutes
- Country: India
- Language: Hindi

Rootha Na Karo (Note: The literal translation of this phrase is "Never be angry with me". But this carries far deeper nuances. By saying this, a lover pleads with his partner, who is in the habit of becoming annoyed far too often for far too trivial reasons. The implication is "you are so lovely, but for this minor problem; please never be angry with me.") is a 1970 Bollywood drama directed by Sunder Dar and produced by Bishwanath Prasad Shahabadi. The film stars Shashi Kapoor and Nanda in lead roles.

== Plot ==
Neeta (Nanda) lives along with her widowed mother (Sulochana Latkar) and her cousin Naina (Kumari Naaz). Sudhir (Shashi Kapoor) was a poor young man and her long-term friend, now her fiancé. They both love each other deeply and Neeta's mother gives her consent to their marriage. But Naina always warns Neeta about Sudhir's intentions and says that he only loves her for her money. Neeta wouldn't listen to her and deeply trusts Sudhir.

She has another cousin Anil, who has passion for stage and theater. He is also friends with Sudhir and highly recommends him. Naina always tries to poison Neeta's mind by telling various examples of how charming young men play the game of love to cheat innocent young woman to steal away their property and succeeds to instill a bit of fear in Neeta's mind. One day, she takes Neeta to a lawyer, where Sudheer was preparing property documents. Naina tells Reeta that Sudheer was trying to change Neeta's property to his name. Reeta confronts Sudheer about that, but it is revealed that Sudheer was preparing documents to transfer everything to Anil, as he doesn't want to touch a penny of Neeta's money.

Neeta feels bad for insulting him like that, but Sudhir, feeling hurt, goes away. At last after a confrontation, Naina reveals that she always wanted Sudheer for herself and as Sudheer didn't reciprocate her feelings, she tried to separate him from Neeta by saying poisonous things to Neeta. She takes poison and dies in the hands of Neeta, telling her that she shouldn't lose a good person like Sudheer. Neeta rushes back to Sudheer and gives him an apology and requests him not to leave her. Anil also comes there and reveals how Naina poisoned her mind. At last, Sudheer is pacified and embraces Neeta.

== Cast ==
- Shashi Kapoor as Sudhir
- Nanda as Neeta
- Kumari Naaz as Naina
- Sulochana Latkar as Neeta's Mother
- Rajendra Nath as Anil
- Tun Tun as Neeta's Maidservant

== Soundtrack ==
All lyrics written by Hasrat Jaipuri and music composed by C. Ramchandra. The tune for the song "Aap Ka Chehra, Mashallah, Zulf Ka Pehra, Subhanallah" is based on That Happy Feeling, a popular music tune composed by Ghanaian musician Guy Warren in 1956 and released in 1957 with the original title "An African's Prayer (Eyi Wala Dong)" and African lyrics. It was later revised and recorded as an instrumental-only, orchestral single by Bert Kaempfert, and released in 1962 with the title That Happy Feeling.

Song	Singer
"Tum Bhi Khoobsurat Ho"	Kishore Kumar
"Ae Meri Shola Badan Rootha Na Karo"	Kishore Kumar
"Dil Mera Le Gayi"	Mohammed Rafi
"Mere Saqiya, Mere Dilruba"	Mohammed Rafi
"Aap Ka Chehra, Mashallah, Zulf Ka Pehra, Subhanallah"	Asha Bhosle, Mohammed Rafi
"Mera Dil Hai Chulbula"	Asha Bhosle
"Tumhare Rooth Jane Se"	Asha Bhosle
