= Amrit Sagar =

Indian filmmaker

Amrit Sagar is a director, producer and writer who works in the Hindi movie industry (Bollywood). He produced and directed his first feature film, 1971, in 2007, which won the National Film Award for Best Feature Film in Hindi. He also directed Hatim.

== Personal life ==
He is the grandson of the filmmaker Ramanand Sagar and son of the producer Moti Sagar. He studied film-making at California College of Arts where he won the Wood Malcom award for writing.

== Career ==
Sagar started his career by directing the hit TV show Hatim for Star Plus. He produced, directed and created Hotel Kingston and Shakuntala for Star One, Prithviraj Chauhan for Star Plus, Jai Shri Krishna for Colors, Meera for NDTV Imagine, Akbar Birbal for Big Magic, Dekh Video Dekh DVD for Colors TV and Dharam Vee forr NDTV Imagine

He produced and directed the 2013 comedy Rabba Main Kya Karoon. He produced his first Marathi language movie, Mitwaa, in 2015.

== Filmography ==
- 1971 (2007)
- Rabba Main Kya Karoon (2013)
- Mitwaa (2015) (Marathi)

=== Television ===
- Hatim (Star Plus)
- Hotel Kingston (Star One)
- Prithviraj Chauhan (Star Plus)
- Jai Shri Krishna (Colors)
- Meera (NDTV Imagine)
- Shakuntala (Star One)
- Akbar Birbal (Big Magic)
- Dekh Video Dekh DVD (Colors TV)
- Dharam Veer (NDTV Imagine)

== Recognition ==
- At 55th National Film Awards he won the award for the Best Feature Film in Hindi for 1971.
- He has won the Best TV show award four times at the Indian Television Academy Awards and the Indian Telly Awards.

== Sources ==
- "I want to make a film in every genre: Amrit Sagar". dna.
- "A look back at the National Film Award for Bollywood's Best Feature Film winners". PINKVILLA.
- "Indian television dot com's Interview with Sagar Arts' Amrit Sagar". indiantelevision.org.in. 3 January 2004.
- "Swwapnil Joshi photos – Nanubhai Jaisinghani, Sanjay Davra, Meenakshi Sagar, Swapna Waghmare, Prasad Bhende, Swapnil Joshi, Sonali Kulkarni, Amrit Sagar – Muhurat of Swapna Waghmare's Marathi movie 'Mitwaa' at Marimba Bar and Lounge in Mumbai". gomolo.com.
- Amrit Sagar at IMDb
- "National Awards:1971 best feature film". IBNLive.
- "55th NATIONAL FILM AWARDS FOR THE YEAR 2007" Press Information Bureau (Govt. of India). Archived (PDF) from the original on 7 October 2009. Retrieved 8 September 2009.
- "I want to make a film in every genre: Amrit Sagar". dna.
- "A look back at the National Film Award for Bollywood's Best Feature Film winners". PINKVILLA.
- "Indian television dot com's Interview with Sagar Arts' Amrit Sagar". indiantelevision.org.in. 3 January 2004.
- "Swwapnil Joshi photos – Nanubhai Jaisinghani, Sanjay Davra, Meenakshi Sagar, Swapna Waghmare, Prasad Bhende, Swapnil Joshi, Sonali Kulkarni, Amrit Sagar – Muhurat of Swapna Waghmare's Marathi movie 'Mitwaa' at Marimba Bar and Lounge in Mumbai". gomolo.com.
