= Udedh Bun =

- Directed by: Siddharth Sinha
- Written by: Siddharth Sinha
- Produced by: Tripurari Sharan
- Cinematography: Dhirendra Shukla
- Edited by: Suchitra Sathe
- Release date: 2008 (Berlin International Film Festival)
- Running time: 21 minutes
- Country: India
- Language: Bhojpuri

Udedh Bun (English title: Unravel) is award-winning short Bhojpuri film released in 2008 directed by Siddharth Sinha. The 21-minute diploma film by Siddharth Sinha, a Film and Television Institute of India (FTII), Pune graduate, was selected for world premiere at the Berlin International Film Festival, where it won the Silver Bear for Best Short Film at the 2008 Berlin International Film Festival, first ever such award in the history of Bhojpuri cinema. Later it won the National Film Award for Best Short fiction Film.

== Cast ==
- Alok Rajwade as Ashu
- Swati Sen
- Jaswant Singh
- Shubhangi Damle as Mother

== Awards ==
Year	Result	Award	Category
2008	Won	Berlin International Film Festival -Silver Bear	Best Short Film
2008	Nominated	Berlin International Film Festival - Golden Bear	Best Short Film
2008	Won	National Film Award	Best Short fiction Film

== See also ==
- Bhojpuri Film Industry
- List of Bhojpuri films
