= The Job (2018 film) =

- Promotional poster
- Directed by: Siddharth Sinha
- Written by: Siddharth Sinha
- Produced by: Kushal Srivastava
- Starring: Kalki Koechlin
- Cinematography: Savita Singh
- Edited by: Abhijeet Desjpande
- Production company: Flying Dream entertainment Pvt Ltd
- Release date: 15 June 2018
- Country: India
- Languages: English; French

The Job is a 2018 Indian thriller short film produced by Kushal Srivastava and directed by Siddharth Sinha. The film was released on YouTube on 15 June 2018 and stars Kalki Koechlin. The short is based on Macbeth.

Koechlin plays an employee struggling against the system and being defeated by loneliness and discrimination. The Job was nominated at the 64th Filmfare Awards in the Thriller category.

== Cast ==
- Kalki Koechlin as the French expat

The film also features an uncredited English and French voice.

== Reception ==
Rahul Desai of Film Companion wrote "The Job is difficult to understand. It is even harder to hear. But then, so is the human mind". A critic from IANS wrote, "The Job has more questions than answers. It relies entirely on its lead actress's ability to convey angst in times of excruciating crisis. And I am not entirely sure that is a good thing or bad".
