= Main Nagin Tu Nagina =

- Main Nagin Tu Nagina Poster
- Directed by: Rajkumar R. Pandey
- Written by: Santosh Mishra
- Produced by: Dilip Jaiswal
- Starring: Manoj R Pandey; Pradeep Pandey; Pakhi Hegde; Sanjay Mishta
- Music by: Madhukar Anand
- Production company: Shri Sai Bandana Films
- Release date: 21 March 2011
- Country: India
- Language: Hindi/Bhojpuri

Main Nagin Tu Nagina is a 2011 Indian, Bhojpuri-language drama film directed by Rajkumar R. Pandey and produced by Dilip Jaiswal, and associate directed by Manoj R Pandey, starring Manoj R Pandey, Pradeep Pandey, Pakhi Hegde, Sanjay Mishta, Vaishnavi. The film was released on 21 March 2011.

== Cast ==
- Manoj R Pandey
- Pradeep Pandey
- Pakhi Hegde
- Sanjay Mishta
- Vaishnavi

== Soundtrack ==
The Music Was Composed By Madhukar Anand and Released by Vee Gee Audio.

Main Nagin Tu Nagina

Soundtrack album by Madhukar Anand
- Released: 1 April 2011
- Recorded: 2011
- Genre: Soundtrack
- Length: 53:46
- Label: Vee Gee Audio
- Producer: Madhukar Anand

Track list
No.	Title	Lyrics	Singer(s)	Length
1.	"Bhangiya Dhatur Se Bhogwa Lagavele"	R.R. Pankaj	Alok Pandey	4:36
2.	"Chote Umir Ke Bare Raja Ji"	R.R. Pankaj	Khushboo Jain	5:31
3.	"Dulha Scent Sabun Kayike Kharidari Jayiha"	Pappu Ojha	Versha Tiwari	4:09
4.	"E Gori Muski Me Kat Nazar Ki"	R.R. Pankaj	Prashant	4:22
5.	"E Jado Ji E Jado Ji Pistal Ke"	R.R. Pankaj	Madhukar Anand	3:46
6.	"Hamar Chadal Jawanee"	R.R. Pankaj	Indu Sonali	3:32
7.	"Humari Muhabbat Ke Roke Tu Je Ayibu"	Kavi Pyare Lal	Indu Sonali	5:40
8.	"Jabse Khiyail Tu Mithai Raja Ji"	R.R. Pankaj	Indu Sonali	5:36
9.	"Nayi Naveli Gadi Hayi Tu Bada Anari"	Shyam Dehati	Kalpana	3:33
10.	"Pahila Uthani Ba Jawaniya Ke Tora"	R.R. Pankaj	Khushboo Jain	4:32
11.	"Sajni Ho Sajni Sajna Ho Sajna"	Kavi Pyare Lal	Madhukar Anand	5:00
12.	"Suna Ae Jaan Chala Jan Sena Taan"	Shyam Dehati	Mohan Rathor	3:29
Total length:				53:46
