= Agar Aap Chahein =

Agar Aap Chahein अगर आप चाहें
- Directed by: Mazahir Rahim
- Starring: Makarand Deshpande
- Release date: 1 October 1992
- Language: Hindi
- Budget: 8,00,000 INR

Agar Aap Chahein is a 1992 Hindi film. It won the prize for best short fiction film at the 1992 National Film Awards.
