= Bhojpuri cinema =

- Main distributors: BB Jaiswal Production; DRJ Films; IJK Films; Nirahua Entertainment; Prakriti Films; Rahul Khan Production; SRK Music Films; Yashi Films; RN Digital Records; Zabawa Entertainment; Vpranjal Film Production

Produced feature films (2022)
- Total: 186 (Theatrical)

Bhojpuri cinema is the segment of Indian cinema dedicated to the production of motion pictures in the Bhojpuri language widely spoken in Bihar and eastern Uttar Pradesh. Bhojpuri cinema has grown in recent years. Bhojpuri cinema also caters to second and third generation emigrants who still speak the language in Guyana, Trinidad and Tobago, Suriname, Fiji, Mauritius and South Africa. With a limited presence in mass media, Bhojpuri cinema acts as a primary vehicle for cultural expression and self-assertion for its people. Its audience is not limited to its home region and the international diaspora; it also includes a large population of migrant laborers from the region who live in other Indian states.

The first Bhojpuri talkie film, Ganga Maiyya Tohe Piyari Chadhaibo, was released in 1963 by Bishwanath Prasad Shahabadi and Nazir Hussain. The 1980s saw the release of many notable as well as run-of-the-mill Bhojpuri films like Bitia Bhail Sayan, Chandwa ke take Chakor, Hamar Bhauji, Ganga Kinare Mora Gaon and Sampoorna Tirth Yatra.

The first Bhojpuri Sci-fi was Maddhim, made by Vimal Chandra Pandey.

== Overview ==
Bhojpuri originates in Western Bihar and Eastern Uttar Pradesh in East India. Speakers of it and its creoles are found in many parts of the world, including the United States, the United Kingdom, Fiji, Guyana, Mauritius, South Africa, Suriname, and Trinidad and Tobago, and Netherlands. During the late 1800s and early 1900s, many colonizers faced labour shortages due to the abolition of slavery; thus, they imported many Indians, many from Bhojpuri-speaking regions, as indentured servants to labor on plantations. Today, millions of people in the Caribbean, Oceania, and North America speak Bhojpuri as a native or second language.

== History ==
=== Initial period (1962–1967) ===
In the 1960s, the first president of India, Rajendra Prasad, who hailed from Bihar, met Bollywood actor Nazir Hussain and asked him to make a film in Bhojpuri, which eventually led to the release of the first Bhojpuri film in 1963. Bhojpuri cinema's history begins with the well-received film Ganga Maiyya Tohe Piyari Chadhaibo ("Mother Ganges, I will offer you a yellow sari"), which was produced by Biswanath Prasad Shahabadi and his partner Jai Narayan Lal under the banner of Nirmal Pictures and directed by Kundan Kumar. The production of the movie was also motivated by a fact that mainstream Hindi cinema seldom depicted the culture and stories of the Purvanchal region (eastern Uttar Pradesh and Bihar).

Throughout the following decades, films were produced in fits and starts. Bidesiya ("Foreigner", 1963, directed by S. N. Tripathi) and Ganga ("Ganges", 1965, directed by Kundan Kumar) were profitable and popular, but in general Bhojpuri films were not commonly produced in the 1960s and 1970s. Between 1962 and 1967, 19 Bhojpuri were made.

=== Decline (1967–1976) ===
In this period, only two Bhojpuri films released, namely Vidhana Naach Nachawe (1968) and Dher Chaalaki Jin Kara (1971).

=== Revival (1977–2001) ===
In 1977, Dangal, the first colour film in Bhojpuri released. In 1979, Balam Pardesia released. In the 1980s, enough Bhojpuri films were produced to tentatively make up an industry. Films such as Mai ("Mom", 1989, directed by Rajkumar Sharma) and Hamar Bhauji ("My Elder Brother's Wife", 1983, directed by Kalpataru) continued to have at least sporadic success at the box office. Nadiya Ke Paar is a 1982 Hindi (Awadhi-Bhojpuri) blockbuster directed by Govind Moonis and starring Sachin, Sadhana Singh, Inder Thakur, Mitali, Savita Bajaj, Sheela David, Leela Mishra and Soni Rathod. However, this trend faded out by the end of the decade. By 1990, the nascent industry seemed to be completely finished. Between, 1977 to 2001, the industry produced about 150 films with an average of 6 films per year.

The industry took off again in 2001 with the Silver Jubilee hit Saiyyan Hamar ("My Sweetheart", directed by Mohan Prasad), which shot its hero, Ravi Kishan, to superstardom. This was quickly followed by several other remarkably successful films, including Panditji Batai Na Biyah Kab Hoi ("Priest, tell me when I will marry", 2005, directed by Mohan Prasad) and Sasura Bada Paisa Wala ("My father-in-law, the rich guy", 2005). In a measure of the Bhojpuri film industry's rise, both of these did much better business in the states of Bihar and Jharkhand than mainstream Bollywood hits at the time. Both films, made on extremely tight budgets, earned back more than ten times their production costs. Sasura Bada Paisa Wala introduced Manoj Tiwari, formerly a well-loved folk singer, to the wider audiences of Bhojpuri cinema. In 2008, he and Ravi Kissan were the leading actors of Bhojpuri films, and their fees increase with their fame. The extremely rapid success of their films has led to dramatic increases in Bhojpuri cinema's visibility, and the industry now supports an awards show and a trade magazine, Bhojpuri City, which chronicles the production and release of what are now over 100 films per year.

=== Post 2001 ===
Many of the major stars of mainstream Bollywood cinema, including Amitabh Bachchan, have recently worked in Bhojpuri films. Mithun Chakraborty's Bhojpuri debut Bhole Shankar, released in 2008, was the biggest and costliest Bhojpuri film at that time. Also in 2008, a 21-minute diploma Bhojpuri film by Siddharth Sinha, Udedh Bun (Unravel) was selected for world premiere at the Berlin International Film Festival. Later it won the National Film Award for Best Short fiction Film.

Bhojpuri poet Manoj Bhawuk has written a history of Bhojpuri cinema.

In February 2011, a three-day film and cultural festival in Patna marking 50 years of Bhojpuri cinema, opened Ganga Maiyya Tohe Piyari Chadhaibo the first Bhojpuri film. The first Bhojpuri Reality Film "Dhokha" is under production under banner Om Kaushik Films is about to be nominated and screened in different International Film Festivals under direction Of Rashmi Raj Kaushik Vicky and Renu Chaudhary.

The industry's modern resurgence from 2001 onwards was driven by significant social and economic shifts. Its commercial success was built upon a new core audience of upwardly mobile lower and middle castes, as well as a large migrant labor population. This shift in audience demographics has been linked to the broader social and political empowerment of these caste groups in Bihar and Uttar Pradesh since the 1990s.

== Themes and aesthetics ==
A recurrent theme in modern Bhojpuri movies is the struggle between rural and urban values. This narrative focus echoes with the experiences of its main migrant viewers. In these pictures, the village is frequently portrayed as a source of heroic, humane, and traditional values, while the city is recurrently portrayed as a landscape of greediness, impersonality, and ethical corruption. Bhojpuri cinema's aesthetic is deeply influenced by old folk theater style of the region, such as Nautanki. This influence is apparent in the high number of song anddance sequences, which often surpass that of Bollywood movies, and a filmic style that occasionally employs slower, more static camera work, simulating a theatrical experience for the viewer.

=== Audience and critical reception ===
Bhojpuri cinema is often criticised in the mainstream media for its alleged vulgarity and obscenity. This is often cited as evidence of a cultural divide between the traditional, sophisticated middle classes and the film's mass audience, which is predominantly made up of semi-literate people from lower castes. Members of this demographic often express nostalgia for Bhojpuri films from the 1960s to the 1980s, which were influenced by a different cultural ethos.

Despite their reputation for explicit lyrics and suggestive dialogue, an analysis of these films suggests that they depict sexuality and physical exposure more subtly than typical Bollywood cinema. Alongside the mainstream film industry, there is a substantial parallel industry producing low-budget films and albums directly for the CD market. This largely informal sector caters to the same migrant audience and is often considered more bawdy than its big-screen counterpart.

== Obscenity and vulgarity ==
Since the revival of Bhojpuri cinema in the early 2000s, sections of the industry have faced criticism for the increasing use of double-entendre dialogues, sexually suggestive lyrics, and provocative dance sequences. Media commentators and academic researchers have argued that the commercial success of certain films and music videos encouraged the production of content that relied heavily on sensationalism and erotic imagery to attract audiences. Critics contend that this trend has overshadowed the industry's earlier reputation for family-oriented storytelling and folk-cultural themes.

The portrayal of women in Bhojpuri films and songs has been a central aspect of this debate. Several scholars have noted that some productions depict women through objectifying representations and gender stereotypes, particularly in so-called "item songs" featuring suggestive choreography and lyrics. Feminist and media studies research has linked these portrayals to broader concerns about misogyny, gender inequality, and the normalization of sexist attitudes in popular culture. At the same time, supporters of the genre argue that such content reflects market demand and should be viewed within the wider context of commercial entertainment industries across India.

The issue has generated discussion among filmmakers, actors, cultural activists, and audiences regarding the future direction of Bhojpuri cinema. Some cultural organizations and commentators have called for greater emphasis on regional literature, folk traditions, and socially relevant themes in order to improve the industry's public image. Others have argued that Bhojpuri cinema is often subjected to disproportionate scrutiny compared with other film industries that employ similar forms of popular entertainment. As a result, debates over vulgarity continue to remain an important aspect of discussions on Bhojpuri cinema's cultural identity and social impact.

== National Film Award winners ==
- Kab Hoi Gavna Hamaar (2005)
- Udedh Bun (2008)

== Notable people ==
Notable personalities of the Bhojpuri film industry include:

=== Film producers ===
- Neetu Chandra
- Rajkumar R. Pandey

=== Film directors ===
- Rajnish Mishra
- Santosh Mishra
- Rajkumar R. Pandey
- Ajay Srivastava
- S. N. Tripathi

=== Music directors ===
- Chitragupt (composer)
- Damodar Raao

=== Lyricists ===
- Shailendra (lyricist)

== Notable films ==
- Ganga Maiyya Tohe Piyari Chadhaibo - First Bhojpuri film, released in 1962

== See also ==
- Cinema of Bihar – Filmmaking industry in Bihar
- Patna Film Festival – Indian film festival
- Rajgir Film City – Film studio complex
