= Bishwanath Prasad Shahabadi =

Indian film producer and businessperson

- Born: 24 January 1912; Arrah, Bihar, India
- Died: 13 July 2000 (aged 88)
- Occupations: Film producer, Businessperson
- Years active: 1962–1992
- Known for: Producing the first black-and-white Bhojpuri film, Ganga Maiyya Tohe Piyari Chadhaibo, in 1962
- Notable work: Ganga Maiyya Tohe Piyari Chadhaibo, Solaho Singar Kare Dulhaniya, Rootha Na Karo, Ganga Dham, Geet Ganga, Sasural, Tulsi, Ghar Jamai
- Spouse: Swarnmani Devi

Bishwanath Prasad Shahabadi, (also spelled as Vishwanath Prasad Shahabadi), also known as B.P. Shahabadi, was an Indian film producer and businessperson known for producing Bhojpuri and Hindi films. He is known as the father of Bhojpuri cinema. He is known for producing the first black-and-white Bhojpuri film, Ganga Maiyya Tohe Piyari Chadhaibo, in 1962. His works include Solaho Singar Kare Dulhaniya (Bhojpuri) and Hindi films like Rootha Na Karo, Ganga Dham, Geet Ganga, Sasural and Tulsi and Ghar Jamai. He died on 13 July 2000.

== Biography ==
He was born on 24 January 1912, in Bandhuchhapra village in Arrah, Bihar. Shahabadi owned mica and coal mines, along with a liquor contract business. Shahabadi owned movie theaters in Dhanbad and Giridih. In 1938, he contributed to the freedom cause by purchasing six yards of khadi from Rajendra Prasad in a special auction for Rs 15,000.

In the 1960s, the first President of India, Rajendra Prasad, asked Bishwanath to make a Bhojpuri film. He produced the film Ganga Maiyya Tohe Piyari Chadhaibo in 1963, marking the first Bhojpuri language film, which was well received. The film was produced by Shahabadi under Nirmal Pictures and directed by Kundan Kumar.

He wrote the story for the 1980 film Ganga Dham. He worked on Geet Ganga Ke, a flop at box office. In 1983, he produced Hamaar Bhauji, a big hit. It was inspired by a famous South Indian film called "Bhabhi" (1957).

== Filmography ==
Year	Film
1992	Ghar Jamai
1989	Ustaad
1985	Tulsi
1984	Sasural
1982	Geet Ganga
1979	Ganga Dham
1970	Rootha Na Karo
1965	Solaho Singar Kare Dulhaniya
1962	Ganga Maiyya Tohe Piyari Chadhaibo

== Personal life ==
He was the youngest among the five children of father Uttamchand Shah. Bishwanath Prasad Shahabadi was married to Swarnmani Devi. He died at the age of 89 on 13 July 2000.

== See also ==
- Bhojpuri cinema
- Dadasaheb Phalke
- Jagannath Prasad Singh Kinkar
