= Giddh (The Scavenger) =

2023 Indian short film

- Promotional poster
- Directed by: Manish Saini
- Written by: Manish Saini; Ashok Sankhla
- Produced by: Radhika Lavu; Amruta Parande
- Starring: Sanjay Mishra; Vaibhav Biniwale; Raj Vitthalpura
- Cinematography: Swathy Deepak
- Edited by: Manish Saini
- Music by: Sagar Desai
- Production company: Ellanar Films
- Release date: August 2023
- Running time: 24 minutes
- Country: India

Giddh (The Scavenger) is a 2023 Indian short film directed by Manish Saini. The film stars Indian actor Sanjay Mishra, who plays a poor man who has lost his son to illness and is compelled to find a way to survive. The film has been presented in numerous international film festivals, including the Rhode Island International Film Festival, the LA Shorts International Film Festival and the 2023 Short Shorts Film Festival & Asia, where it won an Oscar-qualifying award in the Asia International Competition.

== Plot ==
After the death of his son, an old man is compelled to choose unconventional means of making ends meet by reselling the clothes of the dead. Although no longer hungry, he is soon caught up in guilt for what he has done.

== Cast ==
- Sanjay Mishra
- Vaibhav Biniwale
- Raj Vitthalpura

== Reception ==
Since its launch, the film has been selected in various festivals and academies around the world:

Year	Festivals	Award/Category	Status
2023	USA Film Festival	Best Short Film	Nominated
2023	Carmarthen Bay Film Festival	Best Short Film	Nominated
2023	LA Shorts International Film Festival	Best Short Film	Nominated
2023	37th Edmonton International Film Festival	Best Short Film	Nominated
2023	Short Shorts Film Festival & Asia	Best Short Film	Won
2023	Short Shorts Film Festival & Asia	Asia International Competition	Won
2023	Short Shorts Film Festival & Asia	Best Actor (Sanjay Mishra)	Won
2023	International Film Festival of South Asia Toronto	Official Selection	Nominated
2023	Tasveer South Asian Film Festival	Best Short Film	Nominated
2023	54th International Film Festival of India	Indian Panorama	Nominated
