= 1971 (2007 film) =

- Theatrical release poster
- Directed by: Amrit Sagar
- Written by: Piyush Mishra
- Produced by: Amrit Sagar; Moti Sagar
- Starring: Manoj Bajpayee; Ravi Kishan; Chittaranjan Giri; Kumud Mishra; Manav Kaul; Deepak Dobriyal; Piyush Mishra; Vivek Mishra
- Cinematography: Chirantan Das
- Edited by: Shyam K. Salgonkar
- Music by: Akash Sagar
- Production company: Sagar Arts
- Distributed by: Studio 18
- Release date: 9 March 2007
- Running time: 135 minutes
- Country: India
- Language: Hindi

1971 is a 2007 Indian Hindi-language war drama film directed by Amrit Sagar, and written by Piyush Mishra and Amrit Sagar, based on a true story of Indian prisoners of war (POWs) captured by the Pakistan Army during the Indo-Pakistani War of 1971. The film is an account of the attempted escape of six personnel of the Indian Army taken as POWs. The film features an ensemble cast of Manoj Bajpayee, Ravi Kishan, Piyush Mishra, Deepak Dobriyal, Manav Kaul and others. At the 55th National Film Awards, it won the National Film Award for Best Feature Film in Hindi

== Plot ==
The story takes place in Pakistan in 1977, six years after the 1971 Indo-Pakistani War. Indian POWs from the 1971 war are kept in a prison camp along with several prisoners from the 1965 war. The 1971 POWs remain healthy, but the 1965 POWs have gone insane with despair. Major Suraj Singh of the 18th Rajputana Rifles, Captain Kabir, Captain Jacob, and Subedar Ahmed discuss the camp's good facilities. They have been moved into the camp out of several Pakistani jails. The next morning, an army truck is driving towards the camp with a few more Indian POWs. This group includes Flight Lieutenant Ram, Flight Lieutenant Gurtu, and Colonel Puri. They steal a guard's wallet and get a Pakistani army ID card on the way. The POWs realize that they are in a place less than 200 km from the Indo-Pak border. The place, it is revealed later, is Chaklala. When Colonel Puri is told of this and the idea of an escape is put forward, he overrules it. His reasons are that perhaps they will finally be repatriated and that a failed attempt could result in all of them being killed. Pakistani Colonel Shakoor arrives at the Chaklala camp; he informs Colonel Puri and Major Singh that all the POWs will be repatriated. Pakistani Colonel Shakoor also allowed Indian POWs to watch any movie. On the movie day, Ahmed steals a newspaper and discovers that this is a lie made to cover up the existence of Indian prisoners to the Red Cross, and plans to escape are initiated. As a celebration for 14 August, a Ghazal singer is invited to the camp. The soldiers, having managed to forge fake IDs and obtain Pakistani uniforms, plan to use the event as a cover for their escape. Ahmed sacrifices himself to blow up both the ammunition room and the electrical room and dies in the explosion. The other five escape with the singer, whom they let go. The Pakistanis discover the escape. After forcibly moving all the Indian POWs back to the Pakistani jails, they begin a massive manhunt for the five prisoners, led by Shakoor. They hide the identity of the prisoners as Indian POWs and claim they are common criminals. The singer is actually part of a Pakistani human rights commission and reports to the commission's leader that their government is illegally holding Indian POWs. The leader is angry at the deception and promises to inform the Red Cross. Jacob shoots himself, unable to take the pain after he is injured during their stay at a hideout. Ram shoots Shakoor, then destroys many of the search party's vehicles by exploding a grenade on himself, helping his comrades to evade capture. The human rights leader and the Red Cross arrive and question the Pakistani military about the missing POWs, but they are blocked from finding any serious results. Kabir's leg is mangled while driving a captured motorcycle during their escape, then becomes frostbitten by accident. He dies peacefully in his sleep as they reach very close to the Indian border. Suraj is shot and killed by Pakistanis as he is about to cross to the Indian side, and his body is taken away by the Pakistanis. Gurtu witnesses Suraj's death and is recaptured by the Pakistanis offscreen.

It is now in 2007. The place is Multan Jail in Pakistan. We see an old man walking in the prison compound. He has made five little mounds of earth, and he is putting a few flowers on them. He sits on the ground next to them and leafs through what was once Major Suraj Singh's prison diary. This old man is Gurtu. He says that it is impossible to live without hope and that he is alive because of hope. It is revealed that there are still 54 Indian POWs from 1971 in Pakistani jails, and they were last seen alive in 1988.

== Cast ==
- Manoj Bajpayee as Major Suraj Singh
- Ravi Kishan as Capt. Jacob
- Piyush Mishra as Maj. Bilal Malik
- Manav Kaul as Flight Lt. Ram
- Deepak Dobriyal as Flight Lt. Gurtu
- Chittaranjan Giri as Subedar Ahmed
- Kumud Mishra as Capt. Kabir
- Vivek Mishra as Col. Shaharyar Khan
- Gyan Prakash as Col. Puri
- Bikramjeet Kanwarpal as Col. Shakoor Akhtar
- Sanjeev Wilson as Major Karamat Ali
- Satyajit Sharma as Commander of the Indian check post
- Pankaj Kalra as Major Azam Baig

== Music ==
1. "Kaal Ke Antim Palon Tak" – Kailash Kher
2. "Saajana" (Film Version) – Harshdeep Kaur
3. "Sehlenge Hum Saare Sitam" – Shibani Kashyap
4. "Sada Bhangda Paun Nu" – Kailash Kher
5. "Sajna Arabian Sunrise" (Remix) – Harshdeep Kaur
6. "Bhangra Pauna" (Remix) – Kailash Kher

== See also ==
- Prisoners of war during the Indo-Pakistani War of 1971
- The missing 54, missing Indian POWs of the 1971 war
- Deewaar: Let's Bring Our Heroes Home, another Indian film about POWs of the 1971 war
