= Kachichinithu =

Indian short fiction film

- Directed by: Khanjan Kishore Nath
- Written by: Khanjan Kishore Nath
- Produced by: Khanjan Kishore Nath
- Starring: Kamini Beypi; Dipeswar Ronghang; Clarsong Senar
- Release date: 2020
- Running time: 15 minutes
- Country: India
- Language: Karbi

The Boy with a Gun (Karbi: Kachichinithu) is a 2020 Indian short fiction film directed by Khanjan Kishore Nath. It was awarded the Rajat Kamal for Best Short Fiction Film at the 68th National Film Awards.

== Cast ==
- Kamini Beypi
- Dipeswar Ronghang
- Clarsong Senar

== Plot ==
The story follows Lonsing, a schoolboy who comes across a small bag lying on the road. Inside, he finds a pistol. Surprised by the discovery, Lonsing decides to keep the weapon hidden from others. Gradually, his curiosity turns into a secret fascination, and he becomes increasingly drawn to the object. The film examines the attraction that weapons can hold for children, highlighting themes of innocence, temptation, and the risks of unchecked curiosity.

== Release and screenings ==
The film was released in 2020 and screened at various film festivals before gaining national recognition.

== Awards and recognition ==
- National Film Awards for Best Short Fiction Film.
