= Dulu Mahato =

Indian politician

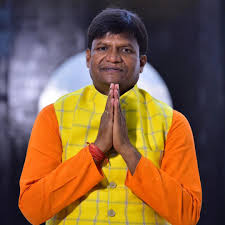

Member of Parliament, Lok Sabha
- Incumbent
- Assumed office 4 June 2024
- Preceded by: Pashupati Nath Singh
- Constituency: Dhanbad

Member of Jharkhand Legislative Assembly for Baghmara
- In office 2009–2024
- Constituency: Baghmara

Personal details
- Born: 12 May 1975 (age 51) Baghmara, Dhanbad, Jharkhand
- Party: Bharatiya Janata Party
- Children: Prashant Kumar Mahato
- Parent: Late Poona Mahato (Father)
- Occupation: Social Worker

Dulu Mahato (born 12 May 1975; Hindi pronunciation: [d̪ʊluː mɛht̪oː]) is an Indian politician from Jharkhand, He was a three-time MLA and is now an MP. He won the 2024 Indian general election in Jharkhand and became an MP from Dhanbad Lok Sabha constituency.

== Early life and education ==
Mahato is from Baghmara. His was born to late Puna Mahato. He completed intermediate in Arts at DAV High School, Katrasgarh, Dhanbad in 1994.

== Career ==
Mahato represents the Baghmara (Vidhan Sabha constituency) since the year 2009 (margin 19,960 votes). From 2009 to 2014 he represented the constituency as a Jharkhand Vikas Morcha (Prajatantrik) MLA but from 2014 (margin 29,623 votes) to 2019 he represented the constituency as a Bharatiya Janata Party MLA. In the 2019 assembly election, he contested and won (meager margin of 824 votes) on the Bharatiya Janata Party ticket.

He won the 2024 Indian general election in Jharkhand from Dhanbad Parliamentary constituency representing Bharatiya Janata Party. He polled 789,172 votes and defeated his nearest rival, Anupama Singh of Indian National Congress, by a margin of 331,583 votes.
