= Siddharth Sinha =

Indian film maker

- Born: 1978 (age 47–48); Ghazipur, Uttar Pradesh
- Occupation: film director
- Years active: 2005-present

Siddharth Sinha (born 1978) is an Indian film maker, whose Bhojpuri short film, Udedh Bun (2008), won Silver Bear at 58th Berlin International Film Festival 2008, the first ever such award in the history of Bhojpuri cinema and 2008 National Film Award for Best Short fiction Film.

== Early life and education ==
Siddharth Sinha was born in 1978 in Ghazipur, Uttar Pradesh, and moved to Delhi at a young age. He received his bachelor's degree in Psychology from Delhi University and graduated in 2007 in film direction from the Film and Television Institute of India at Pune.

== Career ==
He made his debut with the 10-minute docu-fiction Rangbela (2005), screened at the 2006 International Documentary Film Festival Amsterdam.

In 2006, the 2006 Berlinale Talent Campus selected him in the director's batch on the basis of his one-minute preview to a projected documentary, subsequently his graduation short film, Udedh Bun (Un-ravel), a coming of age story of a young boy in an Indian village while taking care of his bedridden mother, which he also wrote. This went on to win the Silver Bear at 58th Berlin International Film Festival 2008. Later the film traveled to all the major film festivals including Pusan and Edinburgh. The same film recently won the National Film Award for Best Short fiction Film this year in India.

He also had directed a music video for Kailash Kher for his first album ‘Kailasha’. He was invited as a jury member to 'Noor de lijk film festival' in Netherlands. Recently, he was invited as an honorary member in the selection committee at Mumbai film festival 2009.

Sinha directed a 15-minute short film starring Kalki Koechlin, The Job (2018 film), which was released on YouTube on 15 June 2018.

In November, 2009, his first Indo-French co production feature film, Twosome (Hindi working title, Do Duni) won the 'Best Promising Film Project Award by Hubert Bals Fund, International Film Festival Rotterdam, and a cash prize of €5,000 at the film bazaar co-production market at the 2009 IFFI, also has been officially invited to Cinemart, Rotterdam International Film Festival in January 2010.

== Filmography ==
- Rangbela (2005)
- Udedh Bun (2008)
- The Job (2018)

== Awards and nominations ==
- 2008: Berlin International Film Festival: Silver Bear: Short Film: Udedh Bun
- 2008: National Film Award: Best Short fiction Film: Udedh Bun
- 2019: 64th Filmfare Awards (Shortfilm - Thriller): The Job
