= Ajay Srivastava =

Indian film director and actor

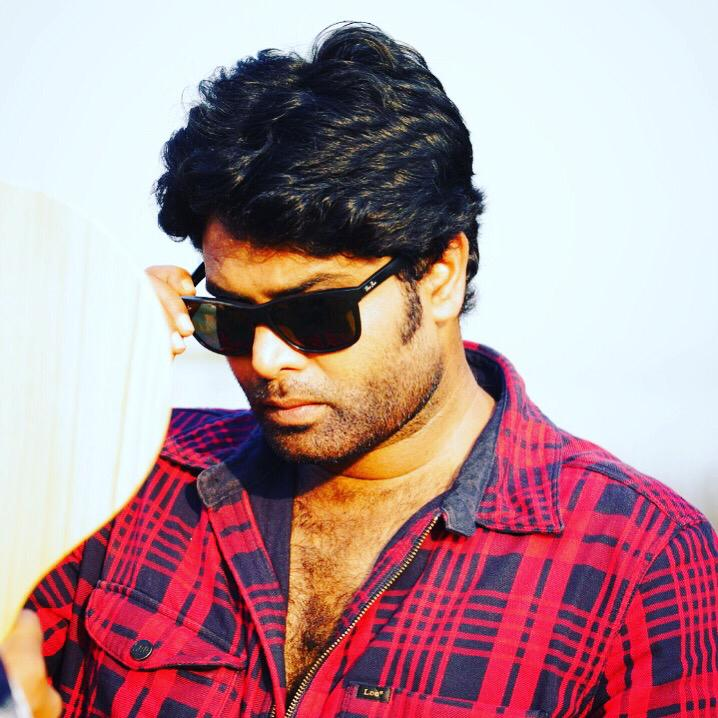
- Born: 17 August 1981 (age 44); Uttar Pradesh, India
- Occupations: Film director, producer, writer, music composer, actor
- Years active: 2008–present

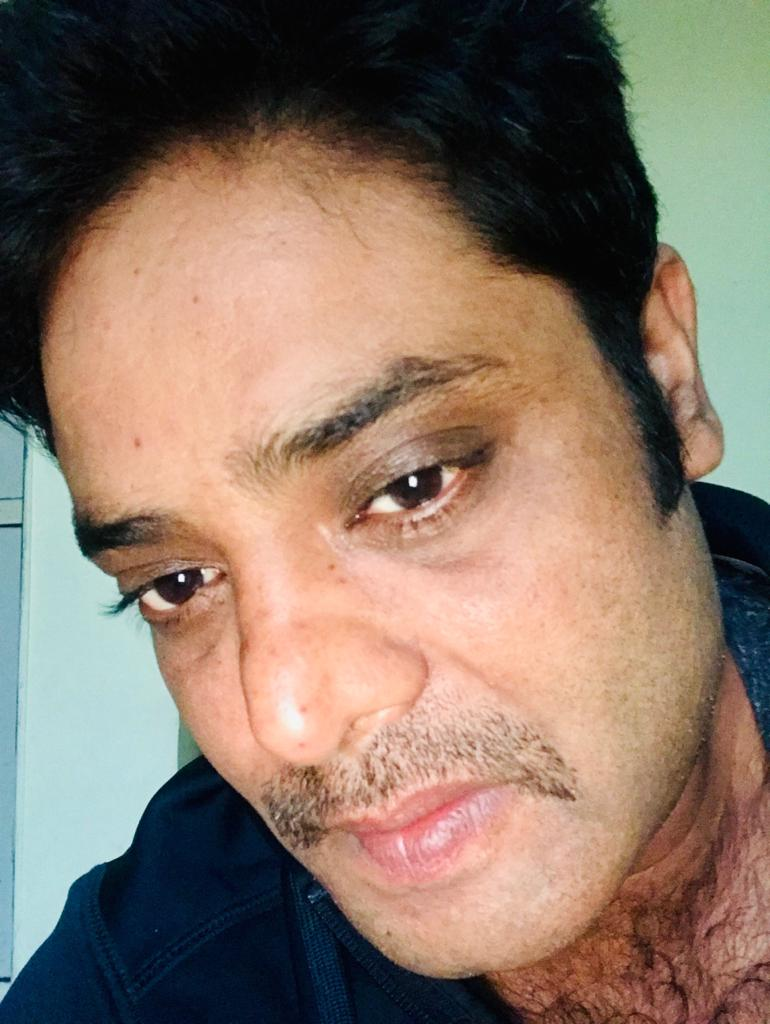

Ajay Srivastava (born 17 August 1981) is an Indian film director, producer, music composer, writer and actor, known for his works in Bhojpuri films.

== Filmography ==
Year	Film	Job(s)
2009	Ho gaini deewana tohra pyar me	Director, writer
2009	Nathuniya me Goli Mare	Producer, director, writer, actor
2010	Insaaf	Director, writer
2011	Maine Dil Tujhko Diya	Director, writer
2012	Dulhe Raja	Director, writer
2013	Tere Naam	Producer, director, writer
2014	Latkhor	Director, writer
2015	Suhaag	Producer, director, writer, actor
2016	Gharwali Baharwali	Producer, director, writer
2017	Nathuniya Pe Goli Mare 2	Producer, director, writer, actor
2019	Parvarish	Producer, director, writer
2020	Raaz Pichhle Janam Ka	Director, writer
2020	Damad Ji Kiraye Par Hain	Producer, director, writer
2020	Gawana 2.0 (Under Production)	Producer, director, writer, actor
2021	Qayamat	Producer, director, writer, actor

2022 |Kahani (Under Production) |Director, writer |} 2022 |Apharan (Under Production) |Producer, director, writer |}
