= Xunyota =

Assamese-language short film

- Directed by: Nabapan Deka
- Produced by: Hiranmoy Gogoi
- Production company: HM Production
- Release date: 2022
- Running time: 29 minutes
- Country: India
- Language: Assamese

Xunyota (Assamese: শূন্যতা; English: Void) is a 2022 Assamese-language short film directed by Nabapan Deka and produced by Hiranmoy Gogoi. The film explores themes of emotional absence and silence within a family setting. It was awarded the Rajat Kamal for Best Short Film at the 70th National Film Awards and received a Special Jury Mention at the 28th Kolkata International Film Festival.

== Cast ==
- Bidya Bharati as Bina
- Hemanta Debnath
- Angshu Borah

== Plot ==
The story follows Bina, a young girl whose mother becomes bedridden due to a serious illness. The narrative focuses on how this situation affects Bina and her family, using silence and limited dialogue to portray emotional distance and loss. The film avoids dramatic expression, instead relying on quiet moments and subtle interactions to convey its themes.

== Awards and recognition ==
- National Film Awards for Best Short Film
- Special Jury Mention Award at 28th Kolkata International Film Festival (2023)
