= Rastriya Colliery Majdoor Sangh =

Indian trade union

- Rastriya Colliery Majdoor Sangh
- राष्ट्रीय कोलियरी मजदूर संघ
- Founded: In the decade of 1940 by the union of Bindeshwari Dubey (Former Chief Minister of undivided Bihar), B.P.Sinha, Ram Narayan Sharma, Kanti Mehta, S. Dasgupta, Murlidhar Prasad and few others.
- Headquarters: Michael John Smriti Bhawan, Rajendra Path, Dhanbad
- Location: India
- Affiliations: Indian National Trade Union Congress (INTUC)
- The name Rastriya Colliery Majdoor Sangh was kept by its then founder President Bindeshwari Dubey in the 1970s.

Rastriya Colliery Majdoor Sangh is a trade union of colliery workers of India. It is affiliated by ITUC affiliated Indian National Trade Union Congress (INTUC), a trade union group made by Indian National Congress leaders. Erstwhile 'Colliery Majdoor Sangh' was founded by the union of veteran trade unionists Bindeshwari Dubey (Former Chief Minister of undivided Bihar), Ram Narayan Sharma, Kanti Mehta, S. Dasgupta, B.P.Sinha, Murlidhar Prasad and few others. They then managed to get it affiliated by Indian National Trade Union Congress (INTUC). Later when Bindeshwari Dubey became its president in the 1970s he renamed it from 'Colliery Majdoor Sangh' to 'Rashtriya Colliery Majdoor Sangh'. Earlier he was its vice president and general secretary.

In 2011, it claimed to have 265000 members.
