= Jaleshwar Mahato =

Indian politician

Jaleshwar Mahato is a politician from Jharkhand, India. He represented the Baghmara (Vidhan Sabha constituency) during the years 2000 to 2009. He represented the constituency as a Janata Dal (United) MLA. He is Jharkhand State President of Janata Dal (United).

Jaleshwar Mahato joined Congress on 29 December 2018 in presence of Rahul Gandhi at New Delhi.
