= Shankar Dayal Singh =

Indian politician (1937-1995)

Dr. Shankar Dayal Singh
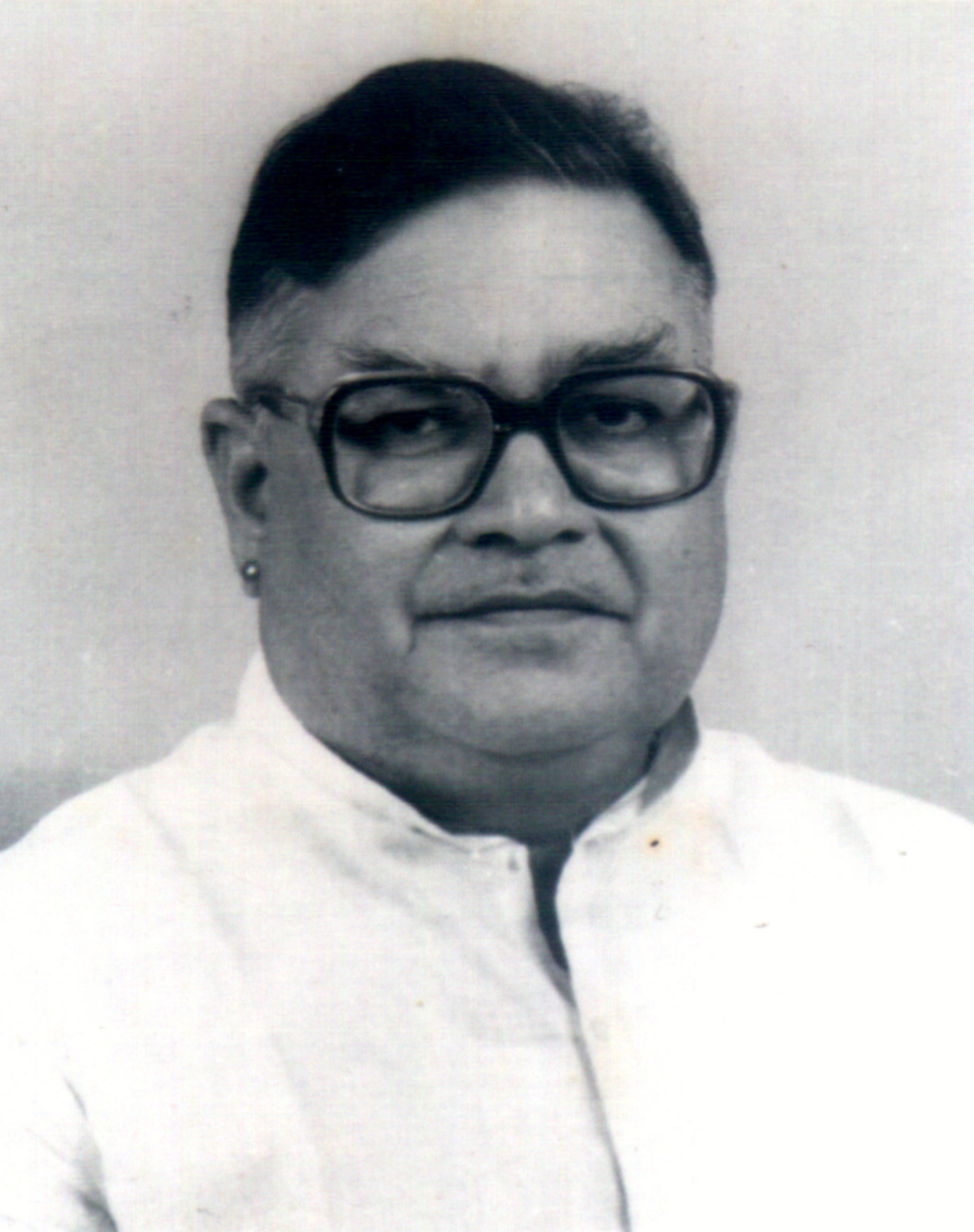
- Dr. Shankar Dayal Singh (1937–1995)

Member of Lok Sabha
- In office 1971-1977
- Constituency: Chatra (then in Bihar)

Member of Rajya Sabha
- In office 1990-1995

Personal details
- Born: 27 December 1937 Aurangabad, Bihar
- Died: 26 November 1995 (aged 57) In train at Tundla
- Party: Indian National Congress (INC) & Janata Dal (JD)
- Spouse: Smt. Kanan Bala Singh
- Children: Ranjan Kumar Singh (Son); Rajesh Kumar Singh (Son); Rashmi Singh (Daughter)
- Education: Banaras Hindu University
- Occupation: Politician, Author
- Profession: Author

Litterateur and parliamentarian Shankar Dayal Singh (Hindi: डा० शंकर दयाल सिंह) was twice elected to the Parliament of India. He was one of the youngest members of the Fifth Lok Sabha, in which he represented the Chatra parliamentary constituency in Bihar (now in Jharkhand). Contesting his maiden Lok Sabha election in 1971, he defeated Smt. Vijaya Raje, the wife of Sri Kamakhya Narayan Singh, Raja of Ramgarh. He was again elected to the upper house, the Rajya Sabha, in 1990 from Bihar.

Dr. Singh was a prolific author and a popular columnist. He authored more than thirty books and edited many more. He was a staunch supporter of Hindi and the Indian Languages. He was the Vice Chairman of the Parliamentary Committee on Official Languages from 7 June 1994 until his demise on 26 November 1995 As the Vice Chairman of the Parliamentary Committee on Official Languages, he promoted the use of Hindi and other Indian languages in official work and also encouraged various Public Sector Enterprises (PSE) to come out with their house magazines in vernacular. As a mark of respect for his untiring services several PSEs have instituted annual awards in his memory.
Singh was equally admired and loved by all across the party line. He died of cardiac arrest during a train journey from Patna to New Delhi in the midway at Tundla on 26 November 1995.

== 75th Birth Anniversary ==
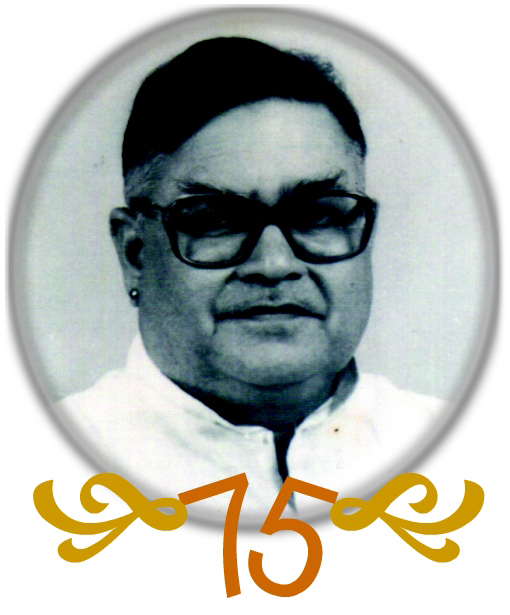

His 75th Birth Anniversary was celebrated from 27 December 2011 to 27 December 2012 as Amrit Mahotsav (Hindi : अमृत महोत्सव) in the country with much fanfare and enthusiasm. The celebrations started with a grand program at New Delhi on 27 December 2011. Programs were held at Goa (February 2012: organized by the Gomantak Rashtrabhasha Vidyapeeth), Indore (July 2012; organized by Sri Madhya Bharat Hindi Sahitya Samiti and by Shankar Amrit Mahotsava Samiti, Aurangabad [Bihar]). Salasar (Rajasthan), Chennai, Rishikesh and Patna.
To mark the Shankar Amrit Mahotsava, Singh's 75th birth anniversary, the Government of Bihar named an important road stretch from NH2 near Deo More (Hindi : देव मोड़) to Bhawanipur in Aurangabad district after the famous Hindi laureate.
A Felicitation Volume entitled Shankar Dayal Singh: Rajniti Ki Dhoop; Sahitya Ki Chhanv (Hindi : शंकर दयाल सिंह : राजनीती की धूप; साहित्य की छाँव ) was also released on the occasion of his 75th Birth Anniversary and a copy of it was presented to the President of India Smt. Pratibha Devisingh Patil at the Rashtrapati Bhavan.

== Memorial awards ==
About a dozen Public Sector Enterprises of India, including the State Trading Corporation of India (New Delhi), HL Life Care Limited (Thiruvanantpuram), NHDC (Bhopal), Securities and Exchange Printing Construction Corporation Limited, Container Corporation of India (New Delhi), PEC Limited (New Delhi), Drazing Corporation of India (Vishakhapattanam), India Infrastructure Finance Company Limited (New Delhi), Hindustan Aeronautics Limited (Bangalore) and National Seeds Corporation (New Delhi) have instituted various annual awards in the memory of the great scholar and Hindi patriarch.
An award by the name of Dr. Shankar Dayal Singh Jan Bhasha Samman (डा० शंकर दयाल सिंह जन भाषा सम्मान) has been instituted in his memory by the Shankar Sanskriti Pratishan. The first award was presented to International Hindi Association of the USA by Honorable Speaker, Lok Sabha Smt. Meira Kumar in a function held at New Delhi on 27 December 2012. The second and third Dr. Shankar Dayal Singh Jan Bhasha Samman was presented to Dr. Ashok Chakradhar and Balendu Sharma Dadhich respectively.

== Early life ==
He was born in Bhawanipur village of Aurangabad, Bihar into a Rajput family to Sri Kamta Prasad Singh 'Kam'. He lost his mother at a very early age and was brought up by his grandmother and paternal aunts. He was a brilliant student of exceptional merit right from his early childhood.

=== Father ===
His father Sri Kamta Prasad Singh 'Kam' was a freedom fighter and was close to Shri Sri Krishna Sinha, the first Chief Minister of Bihar. He himself was a writer of extraordinary merit and authored more than a dozen books. He was also a Member of the Legislative Council (MLC) in Bihar.

=== Education ===
Singh got his primary education at home and went on to study at the Rajghat Besant School in Benaras. He received his B.A. degree from the Banaras Hindu University, followed by M.A. degree from the Patna University. Later, he was awarded D.Litt. by the Vikramshila University.

== Career ==
Singh was a prolific writer and a published author of over 30 books. His memoirs and travelogues found place in almost all the esteemed periodicals of the times, such as the Dharam Yug, Saptahik Hindustan, Kadambini, Dinmaan, Ravivaar etc. besides various news papers like the Nav Bharat Times, Hindustan, Lokmat Samachar, Jansatta, Dainik Jagran, Prabhat Khabar etc. He was also the editor of Mukta Kantha, a literary Hindi magazine. He founded Parijat Prakashan in Patna that became one of the premier Hindi publication houses in eastern India. He was conferred with the title of Bihar Ratna in 1990 and was felicitated with the Anant Gopal Shevade Hindi Samman in 1993, for his contributions to the society and literature.

=== Indian National Congress ===
Besides being one of the youngest MPs in the Fifth Lok Sabha, he was also an elected member of the Central Election Committee (CEC) of the ruling Indian National Congress. He was a special invitee to the Congress Working Committee (CWC). Up against a popular anti-Indira wave in 1977, he lost to Sri Sukhdev Prasad Verma of BLD.

=== Janata Party ===
In 1984, he joined the Janata Party and unsuccessfully contested the parliamentary election from Aurangabad, Bihar, but still he was able to shake the bastion of the Rajput Supremo Sri Satyendra Narayan Sinha as he had to trail in one of the assembly segments for the first time.

=== Janata Dal ===
Singh was one of the founder members of the Jan Morcha with Sri Vishwanath Pratap Singh and raised it in Bihar almost solely. Jan Morcha later merged into the Janata Dal. Thereafter, he was elected to the Rajya Sabha in 1990, the office that he held until his death.

=== Parliamentary committees ===
He served as a Member on various Parliamentary Committees. His contribution as the Member of the Parliamentary Committee on Official Languages deserves special mention. Later, he rose to become its Deputy Chairman (07.06.1994 to 26.11.1995). He was also on the Panel of Vice-Chairmen of the Rajya Sabha (1990–92).

== Services ==
He also served as the Deputy Chairman of the Delhi Public Library and the Kendriya Hindi Sansthan (en. Central Hindi Institute). Earlier, he was a Director on the Board of Samachar Bharti, a news agency for vernacular languages; and went on to become its Chairman. He authored more than thirty books and edited many others. He was a columnist for Hindi dailies and periodicals.

== Personal life ==
A true humanitarian, he was a friend of all and a foe of none. Even being in politics, he did not let himself be bound in the shackles of the party that he represented. He was equally admired and loved by all across the party line. His sudden demise in the night of 26 November 1995, in a train journey between Patna and New Delhi at Tundla, left his family of friends, admirers and followers shocked and surprised. He was survived by his wife Kanan Bala Singh, an educationist, and three children: viz Ranjan Kumar Singh, a journalist, Rajesh Kumar Singh and Rashmi Singh, both in the civil services. His wife, Kanan Bala Singh published her reminiscence on the life of her husband titled Mere Sahchar (English: My Co-partner) in 2001.

== Published works ==
- Yudh Ke Chaurahe Tak
- Yudh Ke Aas Pass
- Gandhi Ke Desh Se, Lenin Ke Desh Mein
- Kitna Kya Ankaha
- Emergency: Kya Sachh, Kya Jhooth
- Emergency: Fact and Fiction
- Kuchh Batein, Kuchh Log
- Ek Din Apna Bhi 1980
- Hindi Sahitya Katipaya More (Hindi), 1980
- Samaya; Asamaya (Hindi), 1980
- Baat Jo Bolegi, (Hindi), 1982
- Paas Se Dekhne Ka Sukh (Hindi)
- Jo Chhor Gaye Veh Bhi Rahenge (Hindi)
- Bheegi Dharti Ki Sondhi Gandh (Hindi)
- Parivesh Ka Sukh (Hindi)
- Rajniti Ki Dhoop, Sahitya Ki Chhanva (Hindi)
- Dhara Ke Is Par, Dhara Ke Us Par (Hindi)
- Surbhit Smritiyan (Hindi)
- Yeh Kahani Nahin (Hindi)
- Gandhi's First Step: Champaran Movement
- Mahatma Gandhi: Pratham Darshan, Pratham Anubhuti (Hindi)
- Mahatma Gandhi: Satya Se Satyagrah Tak (Hindi)
- Gandhi Aur Ahinsak Andollan (Hindi)
- Hindi: Rashtra Bhasha; Raj Bhasha; Jan Bhasha
- Khile Gulab Ki Pankhuri (Hindi)

== Edited works ==
- Pandit Motilal Nehru, a Great Patriot, with D. C. Goswami, R. K. Nayak. National Forum of Lawyers and Legal Aid, 1976
- Acharya Hazari Prasad Dwivedi Smriti Dharohar (Hindi), Muktakantha Prakashan, 1979
- Dr. Karan Singh: Ek Saumya Vyaktitva (Hindi), 1981
- Yaad Ek Yayavar Ki (Hindi), Parijat Prakashan, 1988
- Bihar : Ek Sanstkritik Vaibhav (Hindi)
