= Rajkumar R. Pandey =

Indian screenwriter and film director

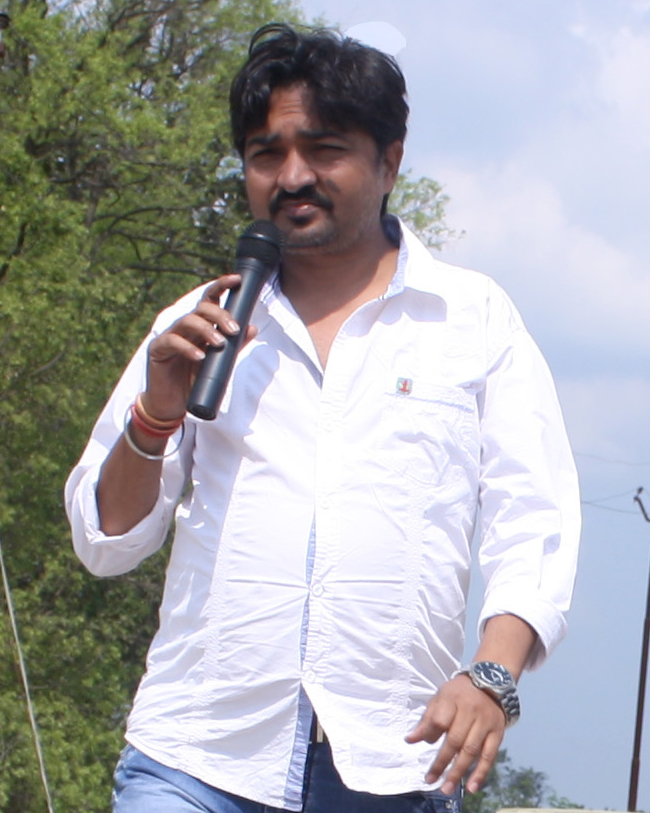
- Pandey at Dulaara shooting
- Born: 6 October 1972 (age 54); Uttar Pradesh, India
- Other name: Manoj R Pandey
- Occupations: Film Director; Producer; Screenwriter; Music Composer
- Years active: 1994–present
- Children: Pradeep Pandey

Rajkumar R. Pandey (born 6 October 1972) is an Indian film director, producer, music composer and screenwriter, known for his works in Bhojpuri films. He also big brother of action samrat Manoj R Pandey, He runs his own film production company "Saideep Films".

Rajkumar R. Pandey is also Sr. Vice President of Indian Film & Television Directors’ Association.

== Filmography ==
Year	Title	Director	Producer	Music Director	Writer	Ref.
2005	Mahiya: Call of Love	Yes				
2008	Kahiya Doli Leke Aiba	Yes				
2008	Lagal Raha Ae Rajaji	Yes				
2009	Deewana	Yes				
2010	Saat Saheliyan	Yes	Yes			
2010	Devra Bada Satawela	Yes				
2010	Lahariya Luta Ae Raja Ji	Yes				
2010	Bhaiya Ke Sasurari Mein	Yes				
2011	Track Driver	Yes	Yes			
2011	Dushmani	Yes				
2011	Main Nagin Tu Nagina	Yes				
2012	Saugandh Ganga Maiya Ke	Yes				
2012	Nagin	Yes	Yes	Yes		
2013	Jeena Teri Gali Mein	Yes	Yes	Yes		
2014	Devra Bhail Deewana	Yes	Yes	Yes		
2014	Saiyan Ji Dilwa Mangelein	Yes				
2014	Khoon Bhari Hamaar Maang	Yes				
2014	Nagina	Yes	Yes	Yes		
2014	Don	Yes				
2015	Chhora Ganga Kinare Wala	Yes		Yes		
2015	Dulaara	Yes	Yes	Yes		
2015	Dulhan Chahi Pakistan Se	Yes	Yes	Yes	Yes	
2016	Deewane			Yes		
2017	Rangeela			Yes		
2017	Sasural	Yes	Yes	Yes	Yes	
2018	Dulhan Chahi Pakistan Se 2	Yes	Yes	Yes	Yes	
2022	Rowdy Rocky			Yes		
