= Parvarish (1977 film) =

- Directed by: Manmohan Desai
- Written by: Kader Khan (dialogue); Prayag Raj (screenplay); K.K. Shukla
- Produced by: A.A. Nadiadwala
- Starring: Shammi Kapoor; Amitabh Bachchan; Vinod Khanna; Neetu Singh; Kader Khan; Amjad Khan
- Cinematography: Sudhin Majumdar
- Edited by: Kamlakar Karkhanis
- Music by: Laxmikant–Pyarelal
- Production company: A.G. Films Pvt.Ltd
- Distributed by: B4U Entertainment
- Release date: 27 October 1977
- Running time: 162 minutes
- Country: India
- Language: Hindi

Parvarish (transl. Upbringing) is a 1977 Hindi-language action crime film directed by Manmohan Desai, starring Shammi Kapoor, with Amitabh Bachchan and Vinod Khanna as two brothers playing oneupmanship, and Neetu Singh and Shabana Azmi as their love interests. The latter four had previously starred, earlier that same year, in Desai's own Amar Akbar Anthony, the highest-grossing film of the year.

Amjad Khan and Kader Khan play the villains. The film also marked Kapoor's full entry into character roles (after his own production Manoranjan), which he would lead in for nearly the next two decades. Laxmikant Pyarelal gave the music to this film and Majrooh Sultanpuri the lyrics.

One of the biggest Diwali blockbusters of all-time, Parvarish was the fourth highest-grossing film of the year at the box office, and one of Desai's four hits that year, the others being Dharam Veer, Chacha Bhatija and Amar Akbar Anthony.

== Plot ==
In 1943 DSP Shamsher Singh captures the notorious bandit Mangal Singh just as Mangal's wife is about to give birth. She dies at childbirth, but not before extracting from the DSP his promise to take care of her son. Subsequently, DSP Singh raises the boy alongside his own. Ironically, DSP Singh's own biological son Kishen has a wicked streak, while Mangal's son, Amit, is endowed with a sweet, honest nature. Released after 14 years in jail in 1957, Mangal finds out that his old enemy is raising his son, who he believes to be Kishen. After a misunderstanding, Kishen comes to believe that he is actually Mangal's son and falls under the bandit's influence, though he continues to live in the inspector's home.

20 years later in 1977, Amit is a police inspector, while Kishen is a teacher for blind children, while simultaneously working as a smuggler for a now-affluent Mangal's gang.

Amit and Kishen encounter a plucky pair of pickpocketing orphaned sisters – Neetu and Shabbo – who are smitten with the brothers and half-heartedly resolve to go straight in order to win them over. Amit, assigned to take down Mangal's gang, eventually encounters Kishen in an altercation that ends with the latter getting shot in the leg. Amit tries to expose Kishen during Shamsher's birthday party, but Kishen tricks his way out of the situation. Later, Kishen's car is rigged with a time bomb by a foe of his. Amit saves Kishen, who was smuggling diamonds at the time, but is caught in the explosion himself; upon gaining consciousness, Amit reveals that he can no longer see.

Kishen, feeling indebted, tries to help Amit cope. Amit, who can actually see, uses this opportunity to gain damning evidence of Kishen's crimes. Shamsher's wife Asha finds out that Amit can see, forcing Amit to tell her the truth about Kishen. A devastated Asha ends up revealing Amit's true parentage. Meanwhile, Neetu and Shabbo try to kill Mangal Singh, who had killed their parents years ago. Mangal captures them, and notices that Neetu has a distinct locket. This locket, given by Amit to Neetu, had previously been given by Mangal to his wife with the intention to pass it on to their son; Mangal thus realizes that Amit is his son.

Shamsher finally confronts Kishen, who is told about his true parentage, as well. Kishen, guilty, repents by leading Amit to Mangal's lair. Mangal holds Neetu and Shabbo hostage and tries to kill Kishen. Amit defeats Mangal's brother Dev in a fight, while Kishen rescues the women. Mangal, having escaped, reports to his boss Supremo, who captures Shamsher. Amit and Kishen team to rescue their father and capture Supremo, leading to an underwater action scene. Mangal finally surrenders to Amit, while Kishen surrenders to Shamsher.

The film ends with Amit and Kishen (having served his sentence) marrying Neetu and Shabbo.

== Cast ==
- Shammi Kapoor as D.S.P. Shamsher Singh
- Amitabh Bachchan as Inspector Amit Singh
- Vinod Khanna as Kishan Singh
- Neetu Singh as Neetu Singh
- Shabana Azmi as Shabbo
- Kader Khan as Supremo
- Amjad Khan as Mangal Singh
- Dev Kumar as Dev Singh, Mangal Singh's brother
- Indrani Mukherjee as Asha Singh (Shamsher's wife)
- Heena Kauser as Mangal Singh's wife
- Chand Usmani as Radha (Neetu and Shabbo's mother)
- Ram Sethi as Neetu and Shabbo's father
- Tom Alter as Jackson, Supremo's second-in-command
- Yusuf Khan as Mangal's Henchmen
- Viju Khote as Smuggler, partner of Mangal Singh and Supremo
- Moolchand as Smuggler, partner of Mangal Singh and Supremo
- Ramayan Tiwari as Smuggler, partner of Mangal Singh and Supremo

== Music ==
The film had music by Laxmikant–Pyarelal and lyrics by Majrooh Sultanpuri.

Song	Singer (s)
"Bandh Aankh Se Dekh Tamasha"	Kishore Kumar, Amit Kumar
"Aaiye Shauk Se Kahiye"	Kishore Kumar, Asha Bhosle
"Hum Premi Prem Karna Jaanen"	Kishore Kumar, Mohammad Rafi, Shailendra Singh
"Sab Janta Ka Hai Yeh"	Lata Mangeshkar, Usha Mangeshkar
"Sambhal Jaye Zara"	Lata Mangeshkar, Usha Mangeshkar
"Jaate Ho Jaane Jaana"	Asha Bhosle, Aarti Mukherjee, Amit Kumar, Shailendra Singh
