= Indrani Mukherjee =

Indian actress (born 1942)

- Born: 1 March 1942 (age 84); Allahabad, United Provinces, British India (present day Prayagraj, Uttar Pradesh, India)
- Occupation: Actress
- Years active: 1960-1984
- Notable work: Usne Kaha Tha; Aakhri Khat; Parvarish; Dharam Veer; Des Pardes
- Spouse: Krishanlal Khanna (m. 1992)
- Children: 4

Indrani Mukherjee is an Indian actress who worked in Hindi films during the 1960s and 1970s and starred in over 70 films. After playing the heroine in some films, notably Usne Kaha Tha (1960) and Aakhri Khat (1966), she moved to playing character roles which were central to the film and made this her forte. Her roles in films like Dharam Veer (1977), Parvarish (1977) and Des Pardes (1978) were the pivot of the storyline, but they were not conventional heroine roles. Each of the movies were a success at the box office.

== Early life ==
Mukherjee was born on 1 March 1942 in Allahabad, United Provinces, into a Bengali Brahmin family. Her father, Dr. Jitendra Mukherjee, was a doctor of medicine who practised in Allahabad. Her mother, Kamini Devi Mukherjee, was a devoted home-maker. Indrani was one of seven children. She had four sisters and two brothers.

== Career ==
In 1960, she was screentested by Bimal Roy, which led to her debut with Usne Kaha Tha (1960), directed by Moni Bhattacharjee and produced by Roy, with Sunil Dutt and Nanda as the leads. Her next film was Dharmputra (1961), opposite Shashi Kapoor and directed by Yash Chopra, and which won the National Film Award for Best Feature Film in Hindi Her next big film was the war film Haqeeqat (1964), directed by Chetan Anand, who subsequently cast her as the lead, opposite debutant Rajesh Khanna in Aakhri Khat (1966), the film received critical acclaim, and was India's entry to the Academy Awards.

For the next decade, Indrani became a regular feature in Hindi films as a character actor in notable films such as Mere Lal (the famous song "Payal Ki Jhankar Raste Raste" was picturised on her), Grahasti, Heer Raanjha (1970), Parvarish (1977) and Dharam Veer (1977), the Dharmendra starrer, in which she played the pivotal role of Rajmata (Queen Mother).

She also acted in a few Marathi and Bhojpuri films including Apradh and Laagi Nahi Chhute Ram (1963). In 1984, Indrani retired from Hindi cinema.

== Personal life and family ==
Indrani married Krishanlal Khanna, a Punjabi Khatri, and moved to Nashik outside Mumbai in 1992.

== Selected filmography ==
- Usne Kaha Tha (1960) - Farida
- Dharmputra (1961) - Meena
- Shaadi (1962) - Kala R. Malhotra
- Laagi Nahi Chhute Ram (1963) - Parvati - Suraj's sister
- Grahasti (1963) - Kamini
- Suhagan (1964) - Sharda's mom
- Haqeeqat (1964) - Ram Swarup's wife
- Chandi Ki Deewar (1964)
- Bagalar Banga Darshan (1964, Bengali)
- Shaheed (1965) - Susheela
- Bharat Milap (1965) - Devi Maa Sita
- Mere Lal (1966) - Jamuna
- Kunwari (1966)
- Aakhri Khat (1966)
- Naunihal (1967) - Uma
- Ghar Ka Chirag (1967)
- Patni (1970)
- Pardes (1970)
- Heer Raanjha (1970)
- Aan Milo Sajna (1970) - Sita
- Truck Driver (1970)
- Sharafat (1970) - (Guest appearance)
- Hare Rama Hare Krishna (1971) - Mrs. Jaiswal (2nd)
- Naya Zamana (1971) - Asha
- Baazigar (1972)
- Bhai Ho To Aisa (1972) - Gayatri
- Zameen Aasmaan (1972) - Urmilla / Maya
- Parchhaiyan (1972) - Seeta
- Dil Ka Raja (1972) - Gauri Singh
- Raja Rani (1973) - Janaki
- Prem Parvat (1973)
- Daaman Aur Aag (1973) - Soni
- Aangan (1973)
- Paap Aur Punya (1974) - Nun
- Trimurti (1974) - Laxmi
- Shaitaan (1974) - Bablu's mom
- Ek Hans Ka Jora (1975) - Anil's sister-in-law
- Zameer (1975) - Mrs. Rukmini Maharaj Singh
- Sanyasi (1975) - Devotee
- Teesra Patthar (1976)
- Suntan (1976)
- Do Khiladi (1976) - Shobha
- Yaaron Ka Yaar (1977) - Shakuntala
- Palkon Ki Chhaon Mein (1977)
- Parvarish (1977) - DSP's wife
- Kitaab (1977) - Kusum
- Ek Hi Raasta (1977)
- Dharam Veer (1977) - Maharani Meenakshi
- Chacha Bhatija (1977) - Sita
- Ab Kya Hoga (1977) -Mrs. Sinha (Raj's Mother)
- Bandie (1978) - Badi Rani
- Des Pardes (1978) - Rama Sahni
- Apna Khoon (1978) - Shanta Verma
- Bhookh (1978) - Thakurain
- Tumhare Liye (1978) - Saudamani
- Amar Shakti (1978) - Leela
- Sarkari Mehmaan (1979) - Didi Maa
- Jhoota Kahin Ka (1979) - Mrs. Shanti Rai
- Jaani Dushman (1979) - Thakurain (Shera's Mother)
- Mr. Natwarlal (1979) - Seema Singh
- Lahu Ke Do Rang (1979) - Ladjo Singh
- Yuvraaj (1979) - Maharani Meenakshi
- Love in Canada (1979) - Shonba
- Jaan-e-Bahaar (1979) - Mrs. Rai
- Dada (1979) - Mrs. Pyarelal
- The Burning Train (1980) - Padmini (Rajaram's wife)
- Gehrayee (1980) - Saroja
- Aas Paas (1981) - Munni
- Fiffty Fiffty (1981) - Mrs. Shanti Singh
- Ghamandee (1981) - Kamlesh's Mother
- Chorni (1982) - Mrs. Uma Sinha
- Rajput (1982) - Rupmati - Manu's Chachi
- Meraa Dost Meraa Dushman (1984) - Janki (Shakti's mom)
- Nirnayak (1997) - Neelam
- Aalo Chhaya (2014) - Mom (final film role)
