= Allah Rakha (film) =

1986 film by Ketan Desai

Allah-Rakha
- Directed by: Ketan Desai
- Written by: K. K. Shukla (screenplay); Javed Siddiqui (dialogue)
- Story by: Prayag Raj
- Produced by: Ketan Desai
- Starring: Jackie Shroff; Dimple Kapadia; Meenakshi Sheshadri
- Cinematography: Jal Mistry
- Edited by: Raju Kapadia; Mangal Mistry
- Music by: Anu Malik
- Production company: M.K.D Films Combines
- Distributed by: Aasia Films
- Release date: 15 August 1986
- Country: India
- Language: Hindi

Allah-Rakha is a 1986 Indian Hindi-language Masala film directed by Ketan Desai and starring Jackie Shroff in the title role with Dimple Kapadia, Meenakshi Sheshadri, Shammi Kapoor, Biswajeet and Waheeda Rehman in key roles. The film is notable as the protagonist, played by Jackie Shroff, is a Muslim, unusual in Hindi cinema that time.

== Story ==
Karim Khan accepts the blame for a murder that his boss, Don had committed and is consequently sent to prison. When Khan's wife Razia visits Don to collect her husband's salary, he tries to rape her, but she escapes. Don is then arrested by Inspector Anwar.

Soon, Inspector Anwar and his wife Salma's only son Iqbal develops a heart condition which can only be cured with an artificial cardiac pacemaker. Since the only chemist selling the pacemaker belongs to Don, Inspector Anwar is blackmailed by Don's goons to release Don in exchange for the pacemaker. Anwar reluctantly agrees and gets the pacemaker for his son, which happens to have the number 786 written on it.

Later on, Don's henchmen kidnap Iqbal, but before they can kill him, he is rescued by Razia, who swaps him with her own dead infant. Sadly, Razia is killed by Don's goons after they hit her with their car. Thinking that her son is dead, Salma runs out into the middle of the road in shock, is hit by a passing truck and loses her eyesight.

When Karim Khan is released from prison, he is handed Iqbal, whom everyone thinks is his son. He then kills Don to avenge his wife's death. Before being arrested by the police, Khan hands over the infant to Salma, asking her to raise him until his sentence is completed. He names the child "Allah-Rakha".

Allah-Rakha grows up to be an honest and brave young man, but is unable to gain admission into the university due to the corrupt Mr Khera (Anupham Kher). He resorts to running a roadside "Panch Tara" (as in five stars) hotel.

Khera then frames Allah-Rakha as being the mastermind behind a series of fatal TV bomb attacks that were taking place all over town. Allah-Rakha is arrested and in prison is reunited with his father Karim Khan.

When Karim Khan is released from jail, he's confronted by Don's son, Don Jr. who has come to avenge his father. He shoots Karim Khan, but the latter survives. When Don Jr. tries to kill Allah-Rakha, he is killed instead. Allah-Rakha then switches places with him and assumes the guise of Don Jr., while the world thinks that Allah-Rakha is dead.

When Karim Khan regains consciousness in the hospital, he immediately seeks out Don Jr. and wounds him seriously, not knowing that he is in fact Allah-Rakha in disguise. In the hospital, while operating on Allah-Rakha, the doctor discovers his 786 pacemakers and thus reveals that he is in fact Inspector Anwar and Salma's son Iqbal.

Allah-Rakha, aka Iqbal, with the help of Khera's daughter Julie, telecast the video in which Khera admits to being the man responsible for the TV bombs as well as a host of other crimes. Khera and his men are arrested while Iqbal is reunited with his family.

== Cast ==
- Jackie Shroff as Allah Rakha aka Iqbal & Don Jr. (dual role)
- Dimple Kapadia as Julie Khera
- Meenakshi Sheshadri as Rani
- Shammi Kapoor as Karim Khan
- Waheeda Rehman as Advocate Salma
- Aruna Irani as Razia Khan
- Bindu as Banu
- Gulshan Grover as Zafar
- Goga Kapoor as Goga
- Anupam Kher as R. S. Khera
- Shakti Kapoor as Pratap
- Bob Christo as Don
- Ramesh Deo as Police Inspector Verma
- Kamal Kapoor as Senior Police Inspector Khanna
- Chandrashekhar as Doctor Surinder Singh
- Mac Mohan as Goon Jagmohan
- Sudhir as Goon Jaichand

== Production ==
Kamal Haasan was first approached for the film, but refused to be a part of the project as the makers had not offered him a bounded script. The move subsequently annoyed Ketan Desai's father, Manmohan Desai.

== Music ==
The music was composed by Anu Malik, with lyrics by Rajendra Krishan and Prayag Raj. The song "Na Amar, Na Akbar, Na Main Anthony" references four of Manmohan Desai's films namely, Amar Akbar Anthony, Naseeb, Coolie, Mard. All of these films had Amitabh Bachchan in the starring role.

Song	Singer
"Main Allah-Rakha"	Mohammed Aziz
"Parvardigar-E-Aalam"	Mohammed Aziz
"Pyar Mita Na Sakoge, Kitna Hi Zor Laga Lo"	Mohammed Aziz, Asha Bhosle
"Na Amar, Na Akbar, Na Main Anthony, Apna Naseeb"	Shabbir Kumar, Asha Bhosle
"Parvardigar-E-Aalam"	Asha Bhosle
"Badtameezi Pe Hum"	Asha Bhosle
"Doli Leke Yahan Koi"	Lata Mangeshkar
