= Nasrali =

- Village
- Location in Punjab, India Nasrali (India)
- Coordinates: 30.67°N 76.27°E
- Country: India
- State: Punjab
- District: Ludhiana

Languages
  - Official: Punjabi
  - Native: Puadhi
- Time zone: UTC+5:30 (IST)
- PIN: 147301
- Vehicle registration: PB-26
- Nearest city: Khanna

Nasrali is a village in the Khanna tehsil of Ludhiana district in Punjab State, India.

== Notable persons ==
- Dharmendra, Bollywood actor was born here. He left this village when he was about seven year old and moved to Sahnewal.

== Gallery ==
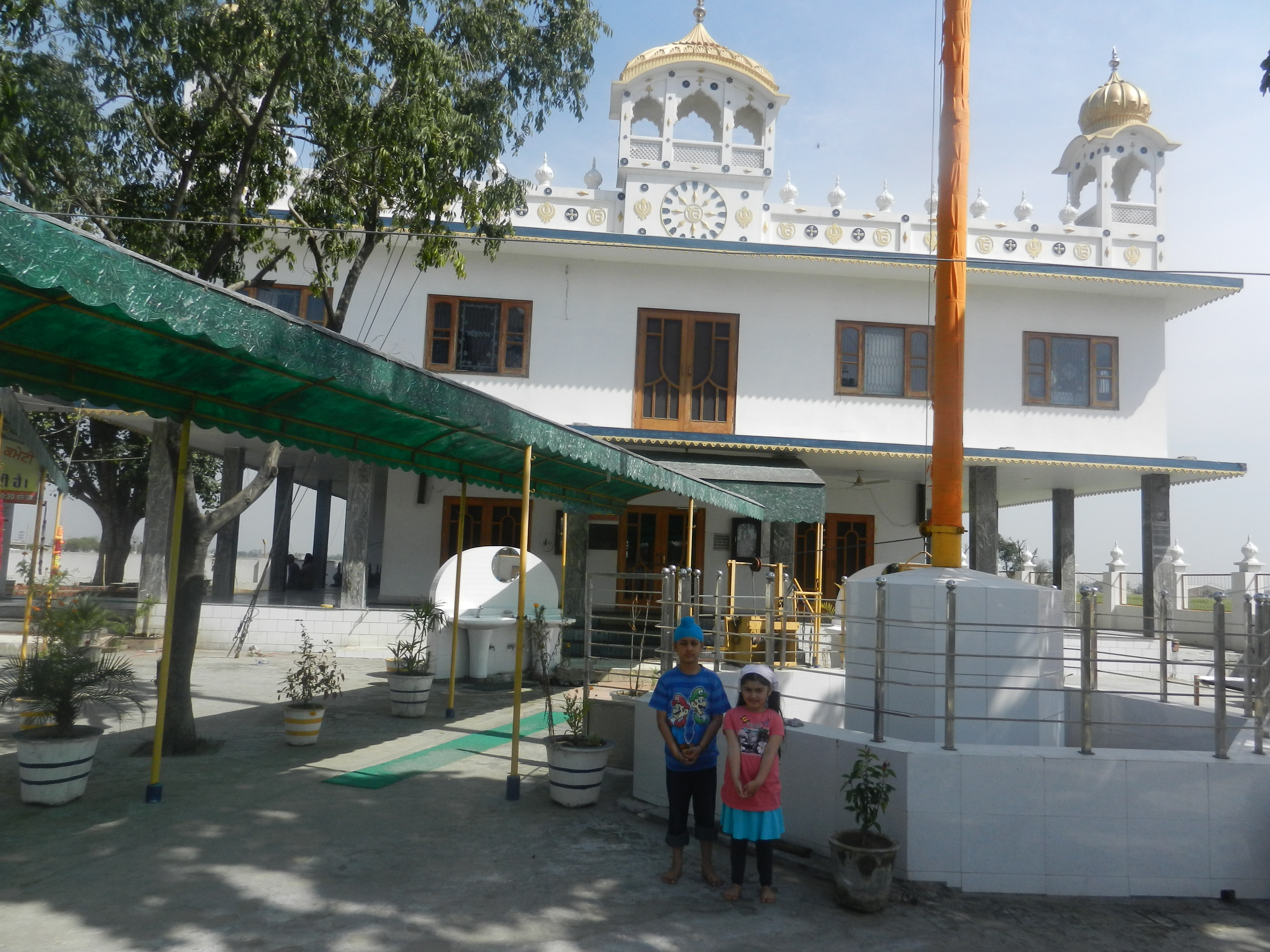
Gurudwara, Nasrali

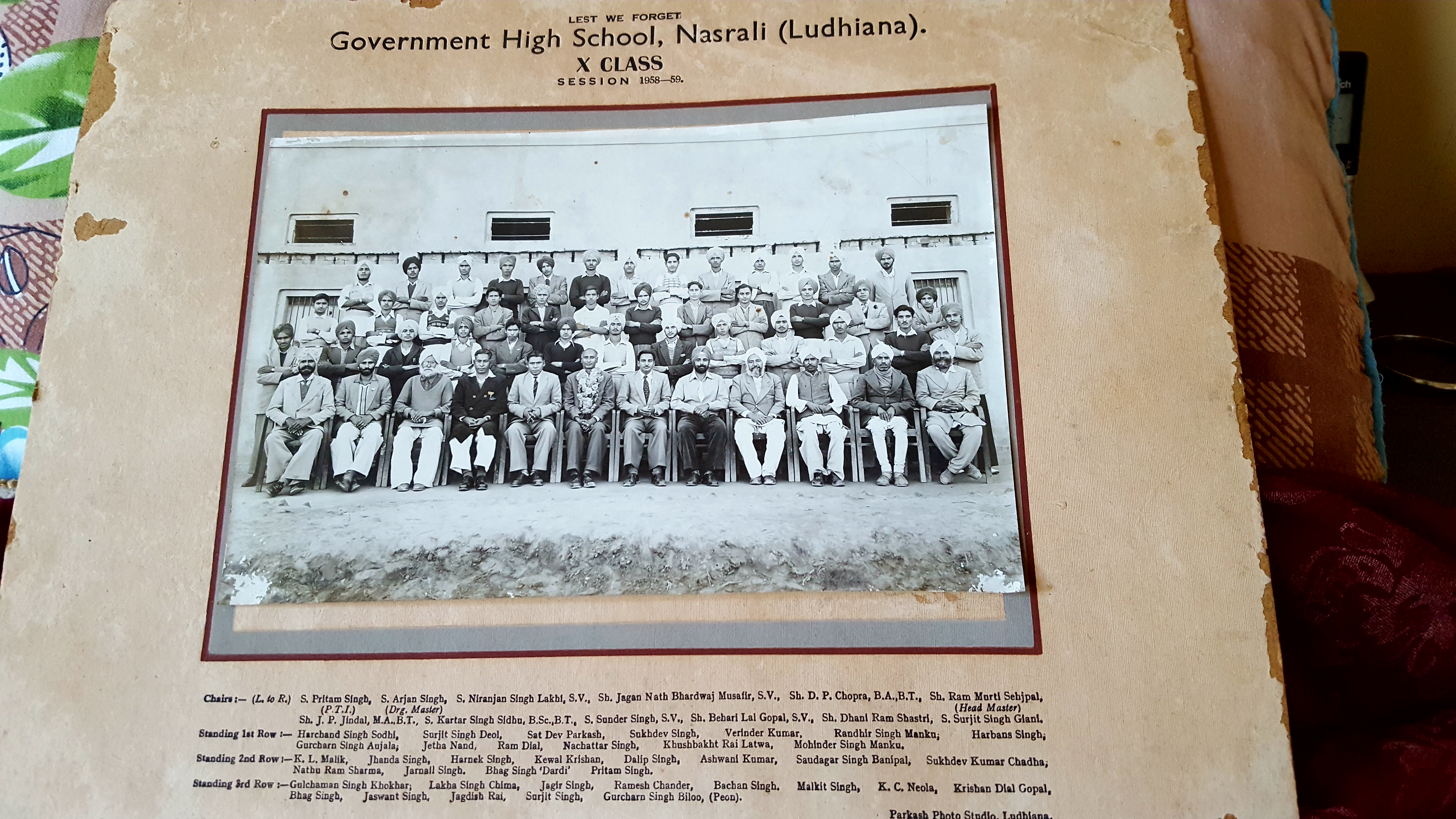
Class X, Nasrali 1958–1959
