= Chacha Bhatija =

- Theatrical poster
- Directed by: Manmohan Desai
- Screenplay by: Salim–Javed
- Story by: Prayag Raj
- Dialogues by: Salim–Javed
- Produced by: Baldev Pushkarna; M. M. Malhotra
- Starring: Dharmendra; Hema Malini; Randhir Kapoor; Yogeeta Bali; Rehman; Jeevan
- Cinematography: V. Durga Prasad
- Edited by: Kamlakar Karkhanis
- Music by: Laxmikant–Pyarelal
- Production company: Dreamland
- Release date: 11 January 1977
- Country: India
- Language: Hindi

Chacha Bhatija (transl. Uncle - Nephew) is a 1977 Indian Hindi-language action comedy film written by Salim–Javed and directed by Manmohan Desai. It was the year's fourth hit for Manmohan Desai (Amar Akbar Anthony, Dharam Veer and Parvarish are the other three). It was his second film with Dharmendra (after Dharam Veer). Chacha Bhatija stars Dharmendra, Hema Malini, Randhir Kapoor, Yogeeta Bali, Rehman, Jeevan, Indrani Mukherjee and Sonia Sahni.

== Plot ==
Ranvir Singh Teja (Rehman) lives with his family, wife Sita, son Sunder and younger brother-Shanker (Dharmendra). The family lives happily, until Sita dies suddenly. Teja remarried, and his new wife is Sonia (Sonia Sahni), who comes to live with him at his palatial home with her wicked brother, Laxmidas (Jeevan). They have a devious agenda of taking over Teja's property. Soon after marriage, misunderstandings arise, and Shanker is asked to leave the house. These misunderstandings involve Sunder, who also is sent away from the house (to a miserable boarding school) by Teja, who thinks that his brother and son are inciting each other and conspiring against his newly-wedded wife Soniya.

Many years pass. Sunder has grown up to be a conman, and Shanker has become a black-marketeer. They come across each other without knowing each other's identity, and a confrontation takes place. When they realize they are uncle and nephew, they decide to expose Sonia, and open Teja's eyes, who is completely blinded by Sonia's love and will not let anyone come between them.

== Cast ==
- Dharmendra as Shanker Singh Teja
- Hema Malini as Mala (Shankar's girlfriend)
- Randhir Kapoor as Sunder Singh Teja
- Yogeeta Bali as Pinky (Sunder's girlfriend)
- Rehman as Ranvir Singh Teja (Shankar's elder brother and Sunder's father)
- Jeevan as Laxmidas
- Indrani Mukherjee as Sita Teja (Shankar's sister-in-law and Sunder's mother)
- Durga Khote as Mrs. D'Silva (Shankar's adoptive mother)
- Sonia Sahni as Sonia
- Roopesh Kumar as Kiran
- Dev Kumar as Tony
- Keshto Mukherjee as Kesto
- Sunder as Police Inspector
- Puddle as Dog

== Music and soundtrack ==
The music of the film was composed by Laxmikant–Pyarelal and the lyrics were penned by Anand Bakshi.

1. "Jeena Zaroori Hai Jeene Ke Liye Peena Zaroori Hai" – Kishore Kumar
2. "Jeena Zaroori Hai Jeene Ke Liye Peena Zaroori Hai" – Asha Bhosle
3. "Kehte Hain Peenewaale Yeh Gham Ka Jaawaab Hai" – Mohammed Rafi, Shailendra Singh, Asha Bhosle
4. "Kehte Hain Peenewaale Yeh Gham Ka Jaawaab Hai" – Lata Mangeshkar
5. "Kyun Bhai Chacha Haan Bhatija" – Mohammed Rafi, Shailendra Singh
6. "Maa Ne Kaha Tha O Beta" – Shailendra Singh
7. "Tera Sheeshe Ka Samaan" – Mohammed Rafi, Lata Mangeshkar
8. "Bhoot Raja Bahar Aaja" - Asha Bhosle
