= Yaarana (1981 film) =

- Poster
- Directed by: Raakesh Kumar
- Written by: Gyandev Agnihotri; Vijay Kaul; Kader Khan
- Produced by: M. A. Nadiadwala
- Starring: Amitabh Bachchan; Amjad Khan; Neetu Singh; Tanuja; Kader Khan; Ranjeet
- Cinematography: Peter Pereira
- Edited by: Waman Bhonsle; Gurudutt Shirali
- Music by: Rajesh Roshan
- Distributed by: A.K. Movies
- Release date: 23 October 1981
- Running time: 119 mins
- Country: India
- Language: Hindi

Yaarana (transl. "Friendship") is a 1981 Indian musical action drama film directed by Rakesh Kumar, starring Amitabh Bachchan, Amjad Khan, Neetu Singh, Tanuja, and Kader Khan. The plot of the film is based on Karna and Duryodhana’s friendship from the Mahabharata.

== Plot ==
Kishan and Bishan are childhood friends. Kishan is an orphan, but is self-sufficient and hard-working, while Bishan comes from an affluent background. The friendship between the two is extremely strong and is the bane of Bishan's maternal uncle, who has his eye on his widowed sister's wealth. In a bid to separate the two friends, the uncle manipulates his sister into sending Bishan away to the city and then abroad for further education.

When the two friends reunite years later, Bishan (Amjad Khan) discovers that Kishan (Amitabh Bachchan) has a great voice. Bishan is now a successful businessman and wants to promote Kishan's singing. Kishan goes to the city with his friend, where Bishan asks Komal (Neetu Singh) to groom him to be a performer and a gentleman. Kishan tries to get expelled from the process by being uncooperative and disruptive.

In the meantime, Bishan discovers that the family wealth has been looted over the last 18 years by the uncle (Jeevan) and his son (Ranjeet). He is forced to borrow by mortgaging his remaining assets in order to ensure that Kishan becomes a successful singer. This causes a major rift between Bishan and his wife, Sheela, who is convinced that Kishan will turn his back on his friend if he were to ever succeed. Kishan's debut concert is a huge success and he goes on to donate the proceeds of his earnings and consequent record deals in order to rid his friend Bishan of his many mortgages and to help reconcile Sheela and lovable nephew (Bishan's 10-year-old son) with Bishan.

Kishan becomes a star and Komal professes her love for him. Bishan, meanwhile, falls into a trap set by his treacherous uncle and cousin. He is kidnapped alongside several hostages - primarily children on his shipping vessel, tortured and forced to sign a confession that all the misdeeds have been done by him. Bishan loses his mental stability and goes into shock.

He is then thrown into an asylum after he has a breakdown and experiences amnesia. Kishan pretends to be mentally ill and admits himself into the asylum by tricking the authorities and saves his friend by reviving his memory successfully by feeding him rotis as he used to when they were children.

The climax follows the typical action confrontation formula reminiscent of films in that era replete with big explosions and the friends single-handedly take on hordes of goons. The movie ends with the children - hostages being saved, the family uniting and the treacherous mastermind being sent to prison.

== Cast ==
- Amitabh Bachchan as Kishan
- Amjad Khan as Bishan
- Neetu Singh as Komal
- Tanuja as Sheela (Bishan's wife)
- Ranjeet as Jagdish
- Farida Jalal in a special appearance
- Aruna Irani as Julie
- Kader Khan as Johnny
- Lalita Pawar as Johnny's mother
- Sulochana
- Jeevan as Bishan's Uncle
- Ram Sethi as Instructor
- Bharat Bhushan as Komal's father
- Mohan Sherry as Mental Asylum employee
- Tirthankar Ghosh as Tirtho
- Yunus Parvez
- Goga Kapoor
- Agha

== Awards ==
29th Filmfare Awards:

Won

- Best Supporting Actor – Amjad Khan

Nominated

- Best Male Playback Singer – Kishore Kumar for "Choo Kar Mere Mann Ko"

== Production ==
The film was launched on 1 July 1977 but it takes 4 years to release due Amitabh Bachchan's commitments. Director Rakesh Kumar initially had no dates available from a heavily booked Amitabh Bachchan,after looking through Bachchan's schedule, Kumar discovered he was free every morning from 7:00 AM to 8:00 AM so Bachchan used daily shoot this time for the film. The entire movie was shot in daily one-hour increments during this early morning window.

== Trivia ==
Neetu Singh left the production midway after experiencing severe anxiety during a shoot at a crowded Kolkata stadium. When she was later unavailable to complete her dubbing, then Rekha completed dubbing of the remaining portions of her dialogue. Amitabh Bachchan personally conceived the idea for the famous light-up costume in the song "Sara Zamana". The jacket was wired with actual light bulbs connected to a plug off-camera. Bachchan had to manually press a switch hidden in his hand in time with the music's beat to turn the lights on and off.

== Soundtrack ==
The soundtrack was composed by Rajesh Roshan. The lyrics of the songs are written by Anjaan. The song "Sara Zamana" was recreated as "Haseeno Ka Deewana" for the film Kaabil by Rajesh Roshan, and this was the first time to recreate his own song, which was the first song of first two own recreations.

No.	Title	Singer(s)	Length
1.	"Bhole O Bhole"	Kishore Kumar	3:43
2.	"Chookar Mere Man Ko"	Kishore Kumar	4:15
3.	"Sara Zamana"	Kishore Kumar	4:27
4.	"Tere Jaisa Yaar Kahan"	Kishore Kumar	4:40
5.	"Tu Rootha Dil Toota"	Kishore Kumar, Chorus	3:06
6.	"Bishan Chacha"	Mohammed Rafi	4:45
7.	"Yaarana Yaarana Toote Kabhi Na"	Sushma Shrestha	3:15
