= Ketan Desai (director) =

Indian film producer

- Born: 29 June 1957 (age 69)
- Occupations: Film Producer, Director
- Notable work: Coolie, Mard
- Spouse: Kanchan Kapoor
- Father: Manmohan Desai
- Relatives: Shammi Kapoor (father-in-law); Geeta Bali (mother-in-law)

Ketan Desai (born 29 June 1957) is an Indian film producer and director. He produced five Bollywood movies and directed three Masala films. He produced the Hindi film Coolie (1983) and was Executive Producer of Mard (1985).

== Family background ==
Desai is the son of film producer and director Manmohan Desai. He is married to Kanchan Kapoor, daughter of actor Shammi Kapoor and actress Geeta Bali. The couple has two daughters: Pooja and Rajeshwari.

== Filmography ==
Year	Title	Director	Producer	Notes
1983	Coolie	No	Yes	
1985	Mard	No	Yes	Executive Producer
1986	Allah-Rakha	Yes	Yes	As Ketan M. Desai
1989	Toofan	Yes	No	
1993	Anmol	Yes	No	
1997	Deewana Mastana	No	Yes	
2002	Yeh Hai Jalwa	No	Yes	Co-producer as Ketan Manmohan Desai
