= Dharmendra =

Indian actor and politician (1935–2025)

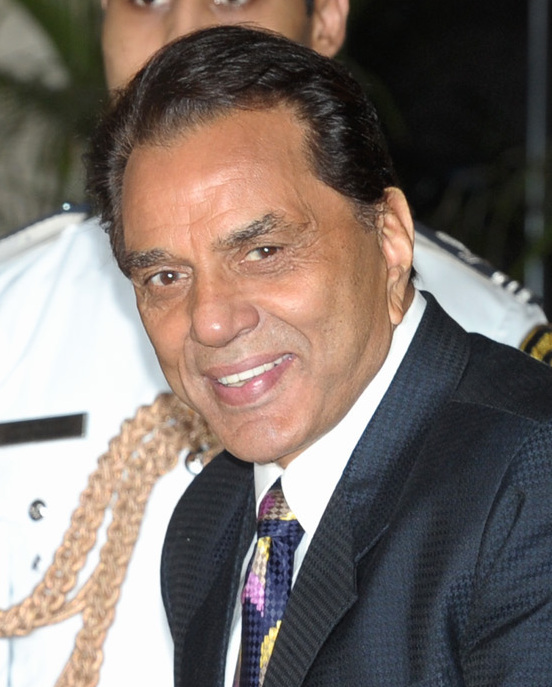
- Dharmendra in 2012
- Pronunciation: [ˈt̪ə̀ɾᵊˌmɪn.d̪əɾ]
- Born: 8 December 1935; Nasrali, Punjab Province, British India (present-day Punjab, India)
- Died: 24 November 2025 (aged 89); Mumbai, Maharashtra, India
- Other names: He-Man; Garam Dharam
- Education: Ramgarhia College, Phagwara
- Occupations: Actor; film producer; politician
- Years active: 1960–2025
- Organization: Vijayta Films
- Works: Filmography
- Spouses: Prakash Kaur (m. 1954); Hema Malini (m. 1980)
- Children: 6, including: Sunny Deol; Bobby Deol; Esha Deol
- Relatives: Abhay Deol (nephew); Guddu Dhanoa (cousin)
- Family: Deol family
- Awards: Full list
- Honours: Padma Vibhushan (2026) (posthumous); Padma Bhushan (2012)

Member of Parliament, Lok Sabha
- In office 13 May 2004 – 16 May 2009
- Preceded by: Rameshwar Lal Dudi
- Succeeded by: Arjun Ram Meghwal
- Constituency: Bikaner, Rajasthan

Personal details
- Party: Bharatiya Janata Party (2004–2009)

Dharmendra (Note: His full name at birth is disputed between Dharmendra Kewal Krishan Deol and Dharam Singh Deol. According to his affidavit and The New York Times his birth name is Dharmendra Kewal Krishan Deol. However according to the BBC, his father gave him the name Dharam Singh Deol.) (Punjabi pronunciation: [ˈt̪ə̀ɾᵊˌmɪn.d̪əɾ]; 8 December 1935 – 24 November 2025) was an Indian actor, producer and politician, primarily known for his work in Hindi films. He is regarded as one of the greatest and most commercially successful actors in the history of Indian cinema. Known as the "He-man", he was popular for his handsome looks and leading roles in several blockbusters. In a career spanning 65 years, he worked in over 300 films, holding the record for starring in the highest number of hit films in Hindi cinema. Dharmendra was awarded the Padma Bhushan by the Government of India in 2012, and was later posthumously conferred the Padma Vibhushan in 2026.

Born in Nasrali, Punjab, Dharmendra made his debut in 1960 with Dil Bhi Tera Hum Bhi Tere. He first gained popularity in the mid-1960s, for films such as Ayee Milan Ki Bela, Phool Aur Patthar and Aaye Din Bahar Ke. He achieved greater stardom in later years, being dubbed India's "He-Man" for several of his on-screen roles in Hindi films. He consistently starred in several successful Hindi films from the late-1960s to the 1980s, such as Ankhen, Shikar, Aya Sawan Jhoom Ke, Jeevan Mrityu, Mera Gaon Mera Desh, Seeta Aur Geeta, Jugnu, Yaadon Ki Baaraat, Dost, Sholay, Pratiggya, Charas, Dharam Veer, Chacha Bhatija, Ghulami, Hukumat, Aag Hi Aag, Elaan-E-Jung and Tahalka. Some of his critically acclaimed performances include Bandini, Haqeeqat, Anupama, Mamta, Devar, Satyakam, Naya Zamana, Samadhi, Black Mail, Resham Ki Dori, Chupke Chupke, Dillagi, The Burning Train, Ghazab and Hathyar.

Beginning in the late 1990s, he appeared in character roles in several successful and acclaimed films, such as Life in a... Metro, Apne, Johnny Gaddaar, Yamla Pagla Deewana, Rocky Aur Rani Kii Prem Kahaani and Teri Baaton Mein Aisa Uljha Jiya. In 1997, he received the Filmfare Lifetime Achievement Award for his contributions to Bollywood. He was a member of the 15th Lok Sabha of India, representing the Bikaner constituency in Rajasthan from the Bharatiya Janata Party (BJP). The patriarch of the Deol family, Dharmendra's private life received much attention, particularly his marriages to Prakash Kaur and actress Hema Malini. For his contributions to the arts, the Government of India honoured him with the Padma Bhushan in 2012 and was later awarded Padma Vibhushan, posthumously in 2026.

== Early life and education ==
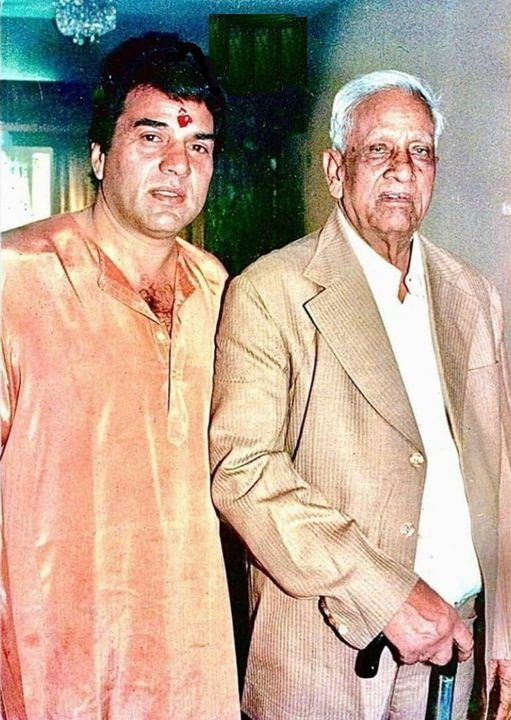
Dharmendra with his father, Kewal Krishan

Dharmendra was born in Nasrali, a village in Ludhiana district, Punjab, British India, on 8 December 1935 as the second child of Kewal Krishan and Satwant Kaur, and was born into a Punjabi Hindu Jat family. He had an elder sister, Harminder Kaur and a younger brother, Ajit Singh Deol. His ancestral village is Dangon in Ludhiana district. His full name at birth is disputed between Dharmendra Kewal Krishan Deol, Dharam Singh Deol and Dharmendra Singh Deol.

He spent his early life in the village of Sahnewal and studied at Government Senior Secondary School at Lalton Kalan, Ludhiana district, where his father was the village school headmaster. He did his matriculation in Phagwara in 1952.

== Career ==
=== 1960–1969: Early career and rise to prominence ===
Dharmendra initially travelled to Mumbai without any clear pathway into the film industry and returned home in Punjab after failing to secure work, taking up employment with a drilling company. He later reapplied himself to acting after seeing an advertisement for the Filmfare magazine talent hunt, for which he returned to Mumbai and was placed second (the winner, Suresh Puri, subsequently faded from public view). Despite this early recognition, he continued to face professional difficulties and reportedly considered leaving Mumbai again until he was persuaded to stay by fellow aspiring actor Manoj Kumar. He later made his film debut in 1960 with Arjun Hingorani's romantic drama Dil Bhi Tera Hum Bhi Tere. The film largely went unnoticed and as a result, did not perform that well at the box office. He saw his first commercial success in 1961 with Ramesh Saigal's Shola Aur Shabnam and followed it with hits, such as Mohan Kumar's Anpadh (1962) and Bimal Roy's Bandini (1963), which won National Film Award for Best Feature Film in Hindi.

His breakthrough came in 1964 when he co-starred alongside Rajendra Kumar and Saira Banu in another of Mohan Kumar's directional venture Ayee Milan Ki Bela. It went on to become a blockbuster and despite playing the antagonist, Dharmendra was noticed by audience and received a nomination in the Filmfare Award for Best Supporting Actor category. That same year, he played the lead role in Chetan Anand's war-drama Haqeeqat. Based on the Sino-Indian War of 1962, the film proved to be a major critical and commercial success, eventually becoming a hit with one of its songs "Kar Chale Ham Fida", a solo by Mohammed Rafi becoming popular. In 1965, he had another success in Ram Maheshwari's romantic drama Kaajal. The film also had Meena Kumari, Raaj Kumar and Padmini in the lead.

In 1966, Dharmendra reunited with Kumari for O. P. Ralhan's Phool Aur Patthar. The film topped the box office chart in 1966, becoming a major blockbuster and making him a saleable star. He received his first nomination in the Filmfare Award for Best Actor category for the film. The success of Phool Aur Patthar was followed by hits in Mamta, Devar, Anupama and Aaye Din Bahar Ke, the same year. He was also given a souvenir at the 14th National Film Awards in recognition of his performance in Anupama. The next year, he worked in commercially unsuccessful, but critically acclaimed films like - Dulhan Ek Raat Ki opposite Nutan and Majhli Didi, Chandan Ka Palna, both opposite Kumari. Dharmendra hit the big league in 1968 with Atma Ram's mystery thriller Shikar and Ramanand Sagar's spy thriller Ankhen. Both the films opened to positive audience response and proved to be successful at the box office with the latter being the top–earning film that year. His other commercially successful releases of 1968 were – T. Prakash Rao's drama film Izzat (in which he played a double role) and Amar Kumar's romantic drama Mere Hamdam Mere Dost. The following year, saw the emergence of star Rajesh Khanna, who starred in back-to-back blockbusters Aradhana and Do Raaste. With his rise, a number of stars went through career decline. During this phase, Dharmendra and Dev Anand were the only actors who were considered unaffected by Khanna's popularity. In 1969, he found success in Aya Sawan Jhoom Ke, Pyar Hi Pyar, and Yakeen. Dharmendra also received acclaim for his portrayal of a righteous man in Hrishikesh Mukherjee's social drama film Satyakam, which is widely considered to be his career-best performance by fans as well as critics and went on to win National Film Award for Best Feature Film in Hindi.

=== 1970–1977: Commercial peak ===
In 1970, Dharmendra delivered four successes and formed a hit pair with Hema Malini. His first release was Satyen Bose's crime drama Jeevan Mrityu. An adaptation of Alexandre Dumas's novel The Count of Monte Cristo, it became a critical and commercial success, becoming one of the highest-grossing Indian films of 1970. His next two films, Bhappi Sonie's Tum Haseen Main Jawan and Asit Sen's Sharafat, both opposite Malini, were also successful at the box office. This was followed by a flop in Ishq Par Zor Nahin alongside Sadhana and a hit in Kab? Kyoon? Aur Kahan? with Babita. His final release of that year was Raj Kapoor's magnum opus Mera Naam Joker (in which he played a supporting role). Although the film was unsuccessful at the time of release, it attained cult status in later years, with many critics hailing it as one of the best Indian films of all time. In 1971, Dharmendra starred in Raj Khosla's action drama Mera Gaon Mera Desh. The film was commercially successful and established his image of an action hero. Dharmendra received his second nomination in the Filmfare Award for Best Actor category for his performance in Mera Gaon Mera Desh. His success continued in the following year with another massive blockbuster in Seeta Aur Geeta, a hit in Raja Jani and a hit film, Samadhi to go with the major grossers. The mass hysteria created by Mera Gaon Mera Desh in 1971, followed by back-to-back hits with Seeta Aur Geeta, Raja Jani and Samadhi in 1972 took Dharmendra to number one position among his contemporaries, thus making him a "superstar".

1973 was the best year of Dharmendra's career with many successes. His first release, which was A. Bhimsingh's action crime film Loafer, emerged a hit with its songs, including "Aaj Mausam Bada Be-Imaan", "Main Tere Ishq Mein", "Koi Shehri Babu" becoming immensely popular among the masses and making its soundtrack one of the best-selling Hindi film albums of the 1970s. This was followed by mystery thriller Jheel Ke Us Paar and action drama Jugnu. While Jheel Ke Us Paar was a hit, the latter proved to be a blockbuster in India as well as Soviet Union, eventually taking second spot at the box office in 1973. Owing to its huge success, Jugnu was also remade in Tamil and Telugu as Guru (1980). His next two releases were - Ravikant Nagaich's spy thriller Keemat and Adurthi Subba Rao's light-hearted drama film Jwaar Bhata. Both the films received mixed critical reception, but emerged commercially successful. Towards the end of the year, Dharmendra appeared in Yaadon Ki Baaraat, Black Mail and Kahani Kismat Ki. Yaadon Ki Baaraat, directed by Nasir Hussain and written by Salim-Javed is widely identified as the first masala film of Indian cinema and proved to be another blockbuster for the actor as well as the second best-selling Bollywood album of the 1970s. On the other hand, Vijay Anand's romantic thriller Black Mail was a critical and commercial failure, but reception later improved, with many calling it one of Anand's most underrated works. The song "Pal Pal Dil Ke Paas" filmed on Dharmendra and Raakhee was a chartbuster and remains popular in modern culture. His final release of the year, Arjun Hingorani's actioner Kahani Kismat Ki continued his dream run and emerged a hit at the box office. The following year, Dharmendra added one more blockbuster in his kitty with Dulal Guha's social drama Dost co-starring Shatrughan Sinha and Hema Malini. The huge box office success of Dost was followed by moderate successes in Patthar Aur Payal and Resham Ki Dori. For his performance in the latter, Dharmendra received his fourth and final nomination in the Filmfare Award for Best Actor category.

The 1975 Emergency had angered the public, and this helped films featuring the lead character revolting against corruption and establishment become successes. The shift from romantic and social movies to action-oriented multi-starrers changed the box office. The year saw the rise of another star, Amitabh Bachchan, but Dharmendra remained rock-steady and continued to deliver huge hits.

In 1975, Dharmendra appeared alongside Bachchan in two films. The first was Mukherjee's light-hearted comedy Chupke Chupke. It received positive response from critics and went on to become a hit at the box office. The second was Ramesh Sippy's actioner Sholay. It released on 15 August 1975, Indian Independence Day, in Bombay. Due to lackluster reviews and a lack of effective visual marketing tools, it saw poor financial returns in its first two weeks. However, from the third week onward, viewership picked up owing to positive word of mouth. During the initial slow period, the director and writer considered re-shooting some scenes so that Amitabh Bachchan's character would not die. When business picked up, they abandoned this idea. After additionally releasing a soundtrack containing dialogue snippets, Sholay soon became an "overnight sensation". The film was then released in other distribution zones such as Delhi, Uttar Pradesh, Bengal, and Hyderabad on 11 October 1975. It became the highest-grossing Hindi-language film of 1975, and film ranking website Box Office India has given the film a verdict of All Time Blockbuster. Sholay went on to earn a still-standing record of 60 golden jubilees (Note: A golden jubilee means that a film has completed 50 consecutive weeks of showing in a single theatre.) across India, and was the first film in India to celebrate a silver jubilee (Note: A silver jubilee means that a film has completed 25 consecutive weeks of showing in a single theatre.) at over 100 theatres. It was shown continuously at Bombay's Minerva Theatre for over five years and in Kolkata's Jyoti Cinema for almost two years. Sholay was the Indian film with the longest theatrical run until Dilwale Dulhania Le Jayenge (1995) broke its record of 286 weeks in 2001.

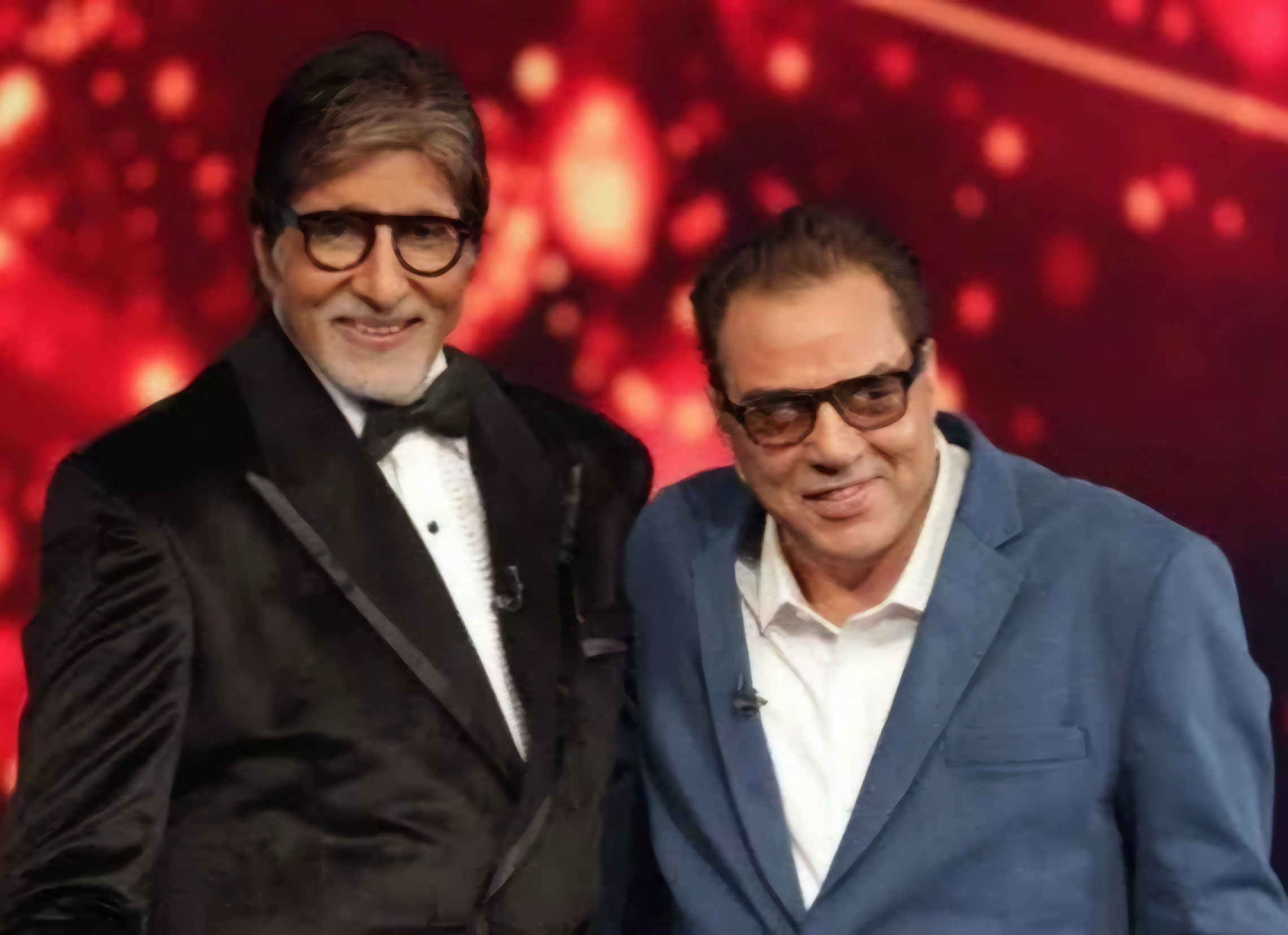
Dharmendra and Bachchan starrer Sholay (1975) recorded an estimated 150-180 million footfalls, making it the highest grossing Indian film in terms of audience attendance to date.

Before the end of year, he delivered another huge success in Pratiggya. The film along with its strong action scenes also had a significant comic track in the form of "slapstick" comedy which led to it being referred as a "masterpiece in comedy". In 1976, Dharmendra reunited with Ramanand Sagar for the action thriller Charas. Set against the backdrop of the expulsion of Indian community from Uganda by its dictator Idi Amin in 1972, it opened to bumper response all over the nation and emerged a hit at the box office. His other release of the year, M. A. Thirumugam's family drama film Maa was thrashed by critics, but still went on to become a success. The year 1977 proved to be a big one for Dharmendra with an All Time Blockbuster in Manmohan Desai's action drama Dharam Veer, a superhit in another of Desai's masala film Chacha Bhatija, followed by two more successful films in Arjun Hingorani's mystery thriller Khel Khilari Ka and Pramod Chakravorty's action comedy Dream Girl. In the United Kingdom, Dharam Veer had 23 shows in 5 cities. Driven by the success of Rafi's songs, the film took a record initial of £50,000 in the UK, equivalent to ₹438,140 (US$50,001.71). In addition, the film sold 32 million tickets in the Soviet Union.

=== 1978–1997: Continued success and minor setbacks ===
Post-1977, the quality of Dharmendra's films dropped and so the number of huge grossers, but his initial draw remained intact, owing to which the flow of successes continued till the 1990s. In 1978, he had four major releases which included Shalimar, Azaad, Dillagi and Phandebaaz. Out of these, Shalimar and Phandebaaz were commercial underperformers while Azaad and Dillagi, both co-starring Malini emerged successful, especially the former which was a hit as well as fourth highest-grossing film of the year. The following year, he added one more hit in his kitty with Mohan Sehgal's Kartavya and a successful film with Dulal Guha's Dil Kaa Heera.

Dharmendra began the 1980s with Ravi Chopra's big-budget action thriller The Burning Train. The film co-starring Jeetendra, Vinod Khanna, Hema Malini and Parveen Babi took a bumper start, but did not do well commercially owing to high costs and lukewarm audience reception. However, it gained cult status in later years. His next two releases were - Alibaba Aur 40 Chor and Ram Balram. While the former was moderately successful, the latter in which he reunited with Bachchan proved to be a box office hit. In 1981, he had a hit in Kaatilon Ke Kaatil, but other releases, such as Aas Paas and Krodhi failed to leave a mark while Brij Sadanah's big-budget actioner Professor Pyarelal ended up as an average grosser. This changed in 1982 as five of his films emerged commercial successes, these were - Samraat, Rajput, Ghazab, Baghavat and Badle Ki Aag.

In 1983, Dharmendra delivered a hit in Rajkumar Kohli's comedy film Naukar Biwi Ka, followed by another success, Qayamat, but his most anticipated film of that year, Kamal Amrohi's period biographical film Razia Sultan was a box office disaster. The next year, he had seven releases, out of which Baazi, Jeene Nahi Doonga and Dharm Aur Qanoon did reasonable business, but rest were critical and commercial failures. In 1985, Dharmendra starred in J. P. Dutta's action drama film Ghulami which also had Mithun Chakraborty, Naseeruddin Shah, Reena Roy and Smita Patil in the lead. The film opened to positive reviews from critics and emerged a hit as well as one of the top five highest-earners of that year. In 1986, he appeared in biggies Main Balwan and Sultanat, both of which did not perform well at the box office.

Dharmendra returned to the big league in 1987 by delivering eight successful films in the year. His first two releases were - Rajkumar Kohli's and Raj N. Sippy's actioners Insaniyat Ke Dushman and Loha, respectively, both of which proved to be box office hits. He then appeared in Dadagiri, Hukumat and Aag Hi Aag. While Dadagiri was an average fare, the latter two went on to become hits with Hukumat emerging as the highest-grossing film of the year. This was followed by T. Rama Rao's hit venture Watan Ke Rakhwale and two more successful films, Insaaf Kaun Karega with Rajinikanth and Insaf Ki Pukar, co-starring Jeetendra. His other huge hits of the decade, include Khatron Ke Khiladi (1988) and Elaan-E-Jung (1989).

With the advent of the 1990s, Dharmendra's star power began to wane. From 1990 to 1992, his successful films included Naaka Bandi (1990), Veeru Dada (1990), Humse Na Takrana (1990), Kohraam (1991) and Tahalka (1992), which also proved to be his final hit as a lead actor. In 1993, he appeared in J. P. Dutta's ensemble action film Kshatriya co-starring Sunil Dutt, Vinod Khanna, Rakhee Gulzar, Sanjay Dutt, Sunny Deol, Meenakshi Seshadri, Raveena Tandon and Divya Bharti. Kshatriya took a record opening, but collections dropped after it was pulled from theatres owing to Dutt's involvement in the 1993 Bombay bombings and it ended up as a flop. In the mid-1990s, he delivered average fares in Policewala Gunda (1995) and Mafia (1996), but his other releases, including biggies, such as Maidan-E-Jung (1995) and Return of Jewel Thief (1996) proved to be box office failures.

In 1997, Dharmendra received the Filmfare Lifetime Achievement Award. While accepting the award from Dilip Kumar and his wife Saira Banu, he became emotional and remarked that he had never won the Filmfare Award for Best Actor despite having worked in so many successful films and nearly a hundred popular films. Speaking on this occasion Dilip Kumar commented, "Whenever I get to meet with God Almighty, I will set before him my only complaint – why did you not make me as handsome as Dharmendra?".

=== 1998–2025: Shift to character roles ===
Since the late 1990s, after what has been termed his 'gold age', Dharmendra appeared in character roles. His first film in such a role was Sohail Khan's romantic comedy Pyaar Kiya To Darna Kya (1998), co-starring Salman Khan, Kajol and Arbaaz Khan. The film received positive reviews from critics and was successful at the box office.

His first two major releases of the new decade were Kaise Kahoon Ke... Pyaar Hai (2003) and Kis Kis Ki Kismat (2004), both of which were box office failures. After this, Dharmendra went on a hiatus for a brief period and returned with three films in 2007. These were - Anurag Basu's drama film Life in a... Metro, Anil Sharma's sports drama Apne and Sriram Raghavan's neo-noir thriller Johnny Gaddaar. Both Life in a... Metro and Apne proved to be critical and commercial successes. On the other hand, Johnny Gaddaar, despite failing at the box office, received praise from critics and attained cult status in later years. The same year, he made a guest appearance in the song "Deewangi Deewangi" from Farah Khan's blockbuster reincarnation drama Om Shanti Om. In 2011, Dharmendra starred in Yamla Pagla Deewana and Tell Me O Kkhuda. While the latter was a commercial disaster, Yamla Pagla Deewana performed very well and emerged a box office hit. He then appeared in sequels to Yamla Pagla Deewana, Yamla Pagla Deewana 2 (2013) and Yamla Pagla Deewana Phir Se (2018), but unlike the first film, both the sequels received poor audience response.

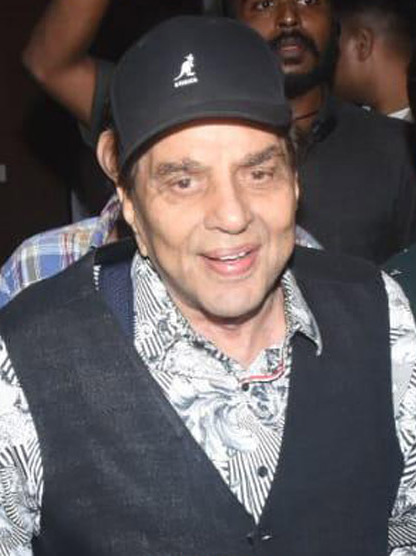
Dharmendra in 2023

In 2023, he appeared in Karan Johar's ensemble family drama Rocky Aur Rani Kii Prem Kahaani. The film opened to a polarising response from reviewers, but grossed over ₹3.5 billion (equivalent to ₹3.8 billion or US$41 million in 2026) worldwide and proved to be a hit as well as the tenth highest-grossing Indian film of the year. At the 71st National Awards, it won National Film Award for Best Popular Film Providing Wholesome Entertainment. The following year, Dharmendra co-starred alongside Shahid Kapoor and Kriti Sanon in the romantic comedy Teri Baaton Mein Aisa Uljha Jiya. The film received mixed to positive reviews from critics, but still did a lifetime business of ₹1.3 billion (equivalent to ₹1.4 billion or US$15 million in 2026) worldwide to emerge a commercial success.

The war drama Ikkis (2026), based on the life of Arun Khetarpal was the final film of his career, however he died before the release of the film.

=== Frequent collaborations ===
Dharmendra's most successful pairing was with Hema Malini, whom he later married. The couple performed together in many films including Tum Haseen Main Jawaan, Sharafat, Naya Zamana, Seeta Aur Geeta, Raja Jani, Jugnu, Dost, Patthar Aur Payal, Sholay, Charas, Maa, Chacha Bhatija and Azaad.

He has worked with various directors, each with a different style of filmmaking. His longest collaboration was with director Arjun Hingorani from 1960 to 1991. Dil Bhi Tera Hum Bhi Tere was the debut film of Dharmendra as an actor and Arjun's first directorial venture with Dharmendra as the lead hero. They worked together in Kab? Kyoon? Aur Kahan?, Kahani Kismat Ki, Khel Khilari Ka, Katilon Ke Kaatil and Kaun Kare Kurbanie where Arjun Hingorani was the producer and the director, and Sultanat and Karishma Kudrat Kaa, produced by Arjun Hingorani. He worked with director Pramod Chakravorty in Naya Zamana, Jugnu, Dream Girl and Azaad. Anil Sharma worked with him in many films including Hukumat, Elaan-E-Jung, Farishtay, Tahalka and Apne.

=== Works in other languages ===
==== Punjabi ====
He has periodically appeared in films in his native tongue of Punjabi, starring in Kankan De Ohle (1970), Do Sher (1974), Dukh Bhanjan Tera Naam (1974), Teri Meri Ik Jindri (1975), Putt Jattan De (1982) and Qurbani Jatt Di (1990). He returned to Punjabi cinema after a gap with the 2014 film Double Di Trouble. According to director Anil Sharma, Dharmendra often worked on Punjabi films late at night and did so without charging any fees, motivated purely by the desire to support small-time regional filmmakers and help struggling productions. Even after completing his mainstream Hindi film schedules, Dharmendra would dedicate hours to such projects, accepting the workload without payment to give those films a chance at success.

==== Bengali ====
At the start of his film career he worked in the Bengali film Paari (1966) directed by Jagannath Chatterjee. The film also featured Dilip Kumar and Keshto Mukherjee in key roles.

== Other works ==
=== Political career ===
Dharmendra served as a Member of the Indian Parliament (Lok Sabha) from Bharatiya Janata Party representing Bikaner in Rajasthan from 2004 to 2009. During his election campaign in 2004, he made an offensive remark that he should be elected dictator perpetuo to teach "basic etiquette that democracy requires" for which he was severely criticised. He rarely attended Parliament when the house was in session, preferring to spend time shooting movies or working at his farmhouse, for which he was also widely criticised.

=== Television ===
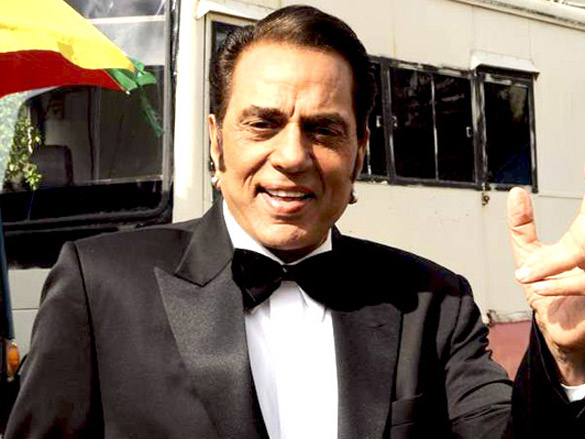
Dharmendra at an event in 2011

In 2011, Dharmendra replaced Sajid Khan as the male judge of the third series of popular reality show India's Got Talent. On 29 July 2011, the show aired on Colors TV with Dharmendra as the new judge and surpassed the opening ratings of the previous two seasons.

In 2023, he appeared in his first television acting role as Salim Chisti in the historical series Taj: Divided by Blood.

=== Producing and presenting films ===
In 1983, Dharmendra set up a production company known as Vijayta Films, which he named after his eldest daughter. In its maiden venture Betaab, released in 1983, Vijayta Films launched Dharmendra's elder son Sunny Deol as the lead actor. The film was the second highest-grossing film of the year. In 1990 he produced the action film Ghayal, also starring Sunny. The film won seven Filmfare Awards, including the Filmfare Award for Best Film. It won the National Film Award for Best Popular Film Providing Wholesome Entertainment. Dharmendra in 1995 produced Barsaat, the costliest Indian film ever made until then, to launch his son Bobby Deol and Twinkle Khanna. It emerged a hit and remains the first and only time to date that such a film was made with newcomers.

=== Poetry ===
Dharmendra had developed a long interest in poetry after frequenting Meena Kumari, also a part-time poet, in the movie Phool Aur Patthar (1966). He was particularly fond of Mirza Ghalib. In 2001, after developing a serious back ailment that required a prolonged stay in hospital, Dharmendra began writing poetry to cope with the solitude. In subsequent years he was known for composing spontaneous verses, often using them to express reflections on life and the deeper dimensions of human experience. His Punjabi poem Aj Bhi Ji Karda Hai Pind Apne Nu Jaanwa ("I Still Yearn To Return To My Village") was featured in his last screen appearance, Ikkis (2026).

== Legacy ==
Dharmendra is widely regarded as one of the most influential personalities in Indian cinema. He was considered one of the most handsome men in the world during his early career and is widely known as the "He-Man" of Bollywood. Considered to be a sex symbol early in his career, Dharmendra was noted for his affection and his appeal to his female fanbase, which according to the BBC was said to be in the "tens of millions".

Dharmendra is the only actor to have twice delivered seven successful films in a year. In 1973, his successful films, included Jugnu, Yaadon Ki Baaraat, Loafer, Kahani Kismat Ki, Jheel Ke Us Paar, Keemat and Jwaar Bhata. In 1987, his profitable ventures were Hukumat, Aag Hi Aag, Loha, Insaniyat Ke Dushman, Watan Ke Rakhwale, Insaf Ki Pukar and Insaaf Kaun Karega.

Following his death, The New York Times called Dharmendra one of India's "most versatile stars". Variety remembered him as "Indian cinema’s most beloved and enduring stars".

=== Critical appreciation ===
Dharmendra most notable acting performances include Satyakam with Hrishikesh Mukherjee, and Sholay, which is listed by Indiatimes as one of the "top 25 must see Bollywood films of all time". In 2005, the judges of the 50th annual Filmfare Awards awarded Sholay the special distinction of Filmfare Best Film of 50 years.

In 2019, Rediff.com placed him 10th in its "Top 10 Bollywood Actors of All Time" list.

In 2022, he was placed in Outlook India's "75 Best Bollywood Actors" list.

While he did receive civilian awards and a "consolation prize" (the Filmfare Lifetime Achievement Award), Dharmendra never won an award for his acting. In a tribute following his death, essayist Mukul Kesavan has argued that Dharmendra's acting talent was long under-recognised because in the early phase of his career, in the 1960s, he frequently appeared in heroine-centric films, thus seeing his screen impact diminished by that of the lead actress, while in the 1970s many of his finest roles occurred in multi-starrers, where his comic and dramatic work had to share space with other prominent actors, further diluting recognition for his individual contributions.

In a 2016 feature in The Hindu, film critic Vijay Lokapally noted that Dharmendra's shift in the 1990s toward low-budget action cinema echoed the career path of wrestler-actor Dara Singh, who had once dominated India's working-class entertainment circuit. He observed that as mainstream Hindi cinema became dominated by younger stars such as the "Khan trio" and Akshay Kumar, Dharmendra deliberately targeted a different audience, comprising labourers, small-town viewers, and long-time fans of traditional action heroes, by appearing in quickly produced, low-cost action films screened largely in single theatres across India's B- and C-circuits. While initially dismissed by the press and some of his admirers as a decline into "B-grade" filmmaking, he argued that Dharmendra's strategy was in fact pragmatic: these films were economically viable, shot within a month, and sustained his connection with a loyal audience base that valued old-style heroism over the romantic trends of the multiplex era. However, his image as a leading man was affected by his decision to act in a number of low-budget or "B-grade" productions, as evidenced by the fact that despite his many commercially successful films, he also holds a record number of flop films, estimated at 180 titles released between 1960 and 2013, most of those occurring during his "B-grade" phase.

=== Industry appreciation ===
When Dilip Kumar was giving the Filmfare Lifetime Achievement Award to Dharmendra, he commented, "Whenever I get to meet with God Almighty, I will set before him my only complaint—why did you not make me as handsome as Dharmendra?". One of the most successful actors of the 1970s and 1980s, Dharmendra appeared in Box Office India's "Top Actors" list eighteen times from 1968 to 1984 and 1987. He topped the list four times (1972–1975).

In an interview, Salman Khan said that Dharmendra is the only person he has consistently followed after his father; he claimed he admires Dharmendra even more than Dharmendra's own sons do. He also praised Dharmendra's enduring appeal, calling him “the most beautiful looking man” because of the innocence and vulnerability in his face combined with a strong physique, a remark that led to Dharmendra being affectionately labelled “macho man". In a 2007 episode of Koffee with Karan, Jaya Bachchan revealed that she had been completely smitten with Dharmendra, describing him as a “Greek god” and even sharing her admiration in front of his wife, Hema Malini. She recalled being so starstruck upon their first meeting that she “hid behind a sofa". Amitabh Bachchan also revealed that Jaya had already told him she admired Dharmendra above all others, saying, “There is nobody in the industry more handsome than him.”

Zeenat Aman described Dharmendra as her favourite co-star, calling him “strikingly handsome” and noting his humble personality, which made her feel at ease during filming. Madhuri Dixit has described Dharmendra as “one of the most handsome persons I have ever seen on screen".

== Personal life ==
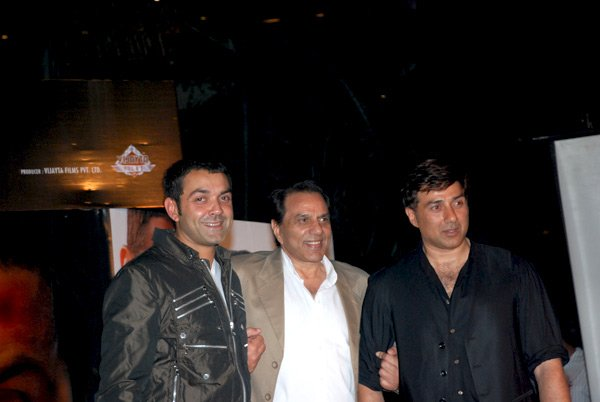
Dharmendra with his sons, Bobby (left), Sunny Deol (right)

=== Relationships and family ===
Dharmendra married Prakash Kaur (born 1 September 1936) at the age of 18 on 11 June 1954, before he entered the film industry. It was an arranged marriage. The couple became parents to two sons, Sunny Deol (born 19 October 1957) and Bobby Deol (born 27 January 1969) both film actors; and two daughters, Vijayta Deol (born on 21 June 1962 and after whom, he named his production company) and Ajeeta Deol (born on 9 November 1966). Throughout his life, Dharmendra spent most of his time with Kaur, while Malini lived independently with her daughters, with him often visiting Malini and their daughters.

After moving to Bombay and entering films, Dharmendra married Hema Malini in 1980 , which caused controversy at the time since he was already married. Rumours began to circulate about Dharmendra and Hema Malini converting to Islam for this wedding. In 2004, during a political campaign, when the rumours began to circulate again, Dharmendra asserted that he remained a Hindu, the family being Arya Samaji. He and Malini starred together in a number of movies in the early 1970s, including Sholay. The couple had two daughters, Esha Deol (born on 2 November 1981) and Ahana Deol (born on 28 July 1985). His grandson, Bobby Deol's younger son, is also named "Dharam", after him.

Dharmendra had a farmhouse in Lonavala, where he lived during his final years. His family resides in Juhu, Mumbai. In 2023, Dharmendra lamented that Bollywood neglected his family and never appreciated Deol family's contributions to Indian cinema.

Dharmendra's relatives in the film industry include his paternal cousin and Punjabi actor Veerendra, his maternal cousin director-producer Guddu Dhanoa, as well his nephew Abhay Deol, son of his younger brother Ajit Deol (d. 2015) who was an actor in both Hindi and Punjabi cinema. Dharmendra launched Abhay Deol through his production house Vijayta Films in 2005 with Socha Na Tha, which was also Imtiaz Ali's directorial debut. His brothers-in-law, through his sisters, were both producers: Sher Jung Singh Punchhe, who had produced Satyakam among others; and Bikram Singh Dehal (d. 2019), who had produced movies starring Dharmendra as well Sunny Deol's debut film, Betaab (1983).

=== Health issues and death ===
In 2010, Dharmendra had quit drinking alcohol after what he called a "health scare." He was previously known for his alcohol addiction, even being called "the biggest boozer in Bollywood", as he would drink up to 12 bottles a day.

Between 2015 and 2020, he had multiple health issues, including back pain, muscle strain, and weakness, which occasionally required hospitalisation. In 2025, Dharmendra underwent a corneal transplant surgery after the cornea of his left eye was damaged.

He had also been hospitalised on 31 October 2025 at the Breach Candy Hospital in Mumbai due to breathing difficulties. He was admitted to the ICU for observation and was discharged within a few hours once all his vital parameters stabilised.

On 10 November 2025, Dharmendra was again admitted to Breach Candy Hospital after complaining of respiratory issues. His second wife, Hema Malini, shared on social media that he was under continuous medical supervision. According to reports, he was placed on ventilator support as his condition became critical. Several actors, politicians, and fans across the country expressed their concern and prayed for his speedy recovery.

On 11 November 2025, rumours began circulating on social media and several news channels claiming that Dharmendra had died. The reports spread rapidly, with many media outlets broadcasting the unverified news. His death rumours flooded the internet after Indian Defence Minister Rajnath Singh and poet and lyricist Javed Akhtar even mourned his death in a post. Later, Hema Malini and daughter Esha Deol dismissed the rumours through their social media accounts, confirming that Dharmendra was alive and in stable condition. They condemned the spread of such false information, calling it completely unacceptable and irresponsible.

Dharmendra died on 24 November 2025 at his residence in Mumbai, at the age of 89 following age-related illness, two weeks before his 90th birthday. His last rites were held at the Pawan Hans crematorium in the Vile Parle area of Mumbai, with family members and numerous film-industry colleagues in attendance. Upon the release of Ikkis on 1 January 2026, his last film, tributes were paid to him along with his Sholay and Chupke Chupke co-star Asrani, who died on 20 October 2025.

== Accolades and honours ==
=== Civilian awards ===
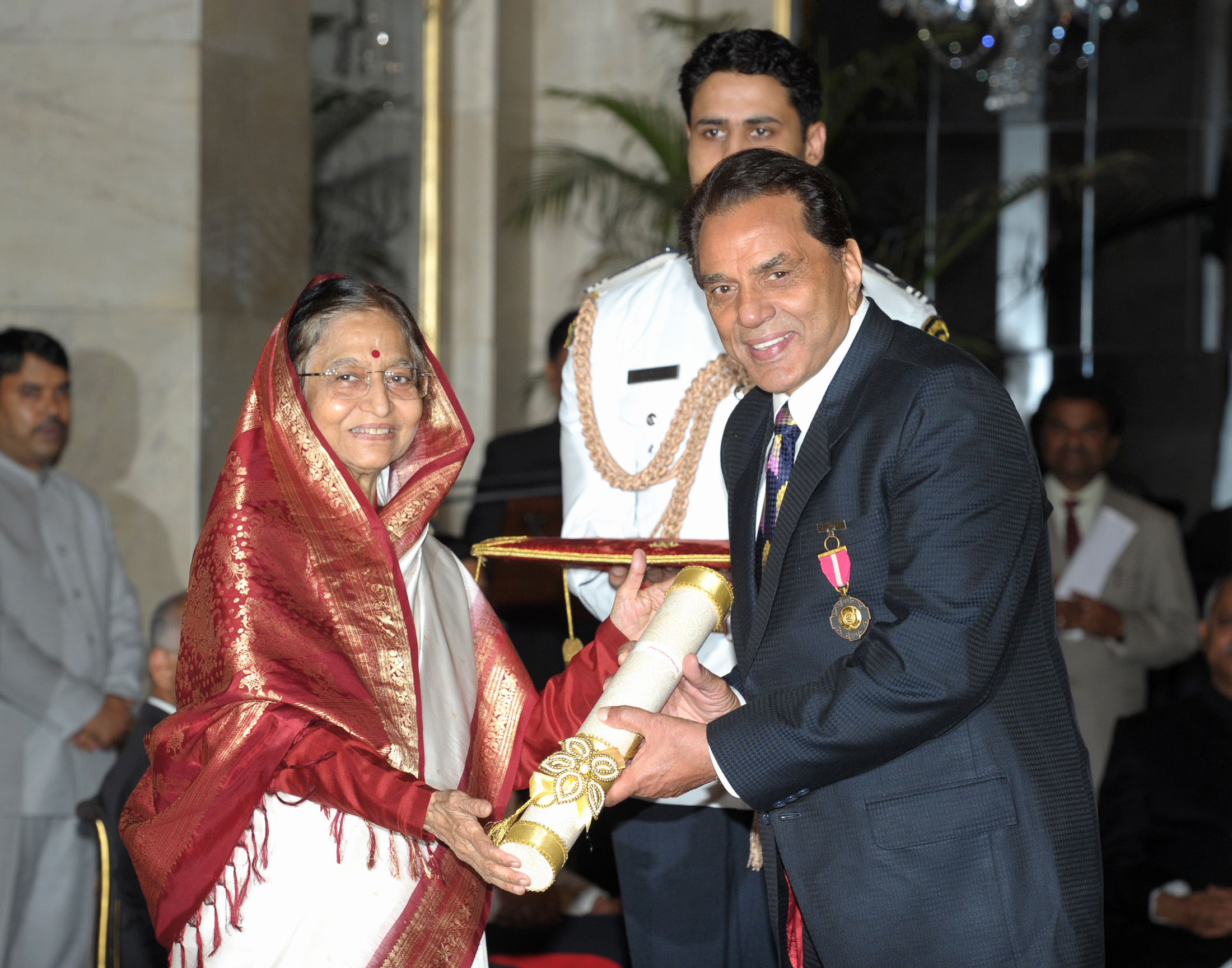
Then President of India, Pratibha Patil presenting the Padma Bhushan Award to Dharmendra in 2012

- 2026 – Padma Vibhushan, India's second highest civilian honour from the Government of India posthumoously
- 2012 – Padma Bhushan, India's third highest civilian honour from the Government of India

=== National Film Awards ===
- 1990 – Best Popular Film Providing Wholesome Entertainment – Ghayal

=== Filmfare Awards ===
Year	Category	Film	Result
1965	Best Supporting Actor	Ayee Milan Ki Bela	Nominated
1967	Best Actor	Phool Aur Patthar	Nominated
1972	Best Actor	Mera Gaon Mera Desh	Nominated
1974	Best Actor	Yaadon Ki Baaraat	Nominated
1975	Best Actor	Resham Ki Dori	Nominated
1991	Best Film	Ghayal	Won
1997	Lifetime Achievement Award	—	Won

=== Other awards and recognitions ===
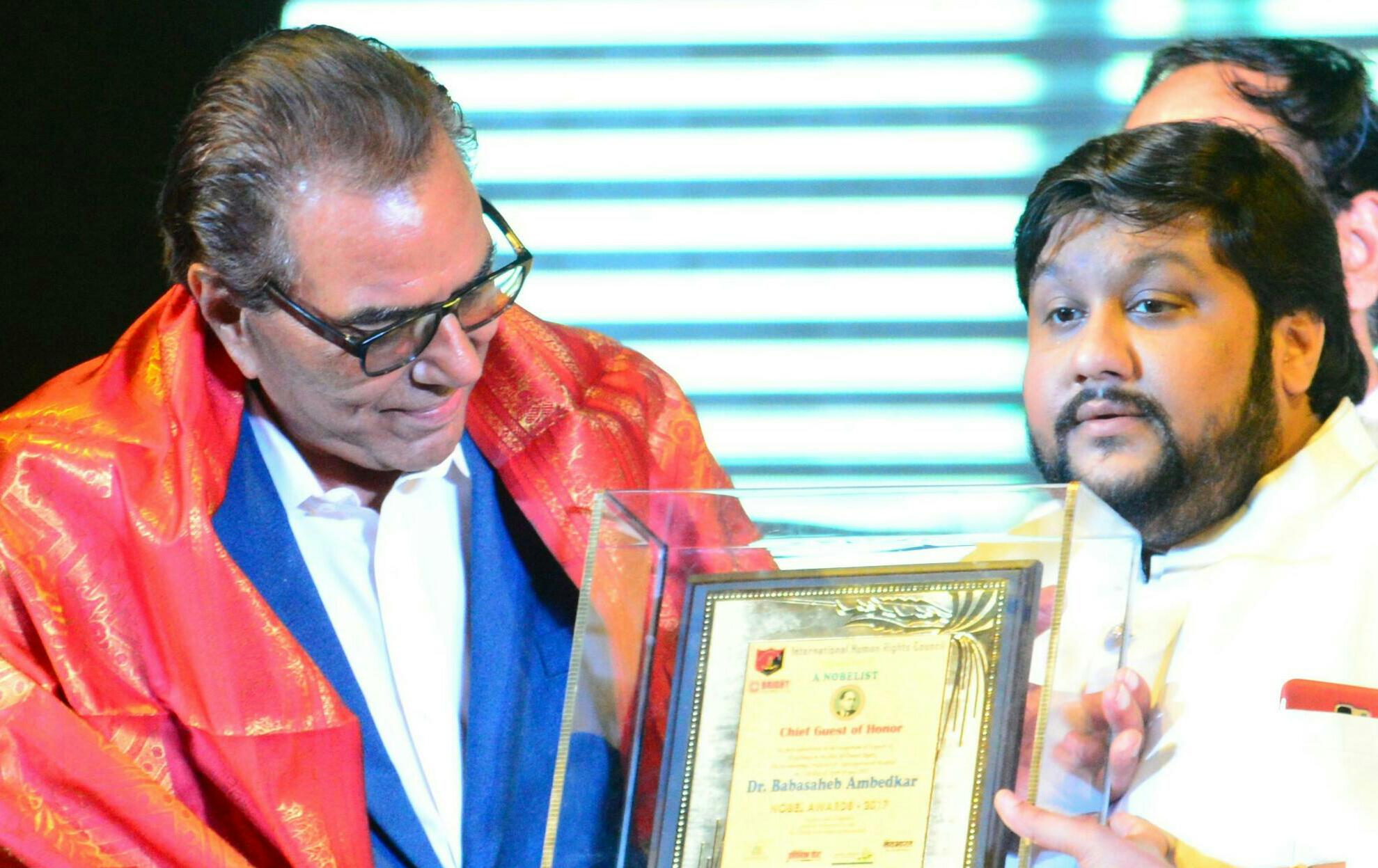
Dharmendra being given the Babasaheb Ambedkar Nobel Award in 2017

- In the mid-seventies, Dharmendra was voted one of the most handsome men in the world.
- In 1999, Lifetime Achievement at the Annual Kalakar Awards.
- He was a recipient of the "Living Legend Award" by the Federation of Indian Chamber of Commerce and Industry (FICCI) in recognition of his outstanding contribution to the Indian entertainment industry.
- In 2003 he received a Lifetime Achievement Award at the Sansui Viewers' Choice Movie Awards.
- In 2004, he was honoured for Best Contribution to Indian Cinema.
- In 2005, he received the Zee Cine Award for Lifetime Achievement.
- In 2007, he was awarded a Lifetime Achievement Award at the Pune International Film Festival (PIFF)
- In 2007, he received an IIFA Lifetime Achievement Award.
- In 2007, he received an award for Humanitarian Services to the Indian Nation.
- In 2007, he was awarded a Lifetime Achievement award by DBR Entertainment.
- In 2007, the Punjabi newspaper Quami Ekta honoured him for his contributions to Indian cinema.
- In 2008, he was named "Actor Par Excellence" at the Max Stardust Awards.
- In 2008, he received a Lifetime Achievement Award at the 10th Mumbai Academy of the Moving Image (MAMI) International Film Festival.
- In 2009, he received a Lifetime Achievement Award at the Nashik International Film Festival (NIFF).
- In 2011, he received a Lifetime Achievement Award at the Apsara Film & Television Producers Guild Award.
- In 2011, he received a "Salaam Maharashtra Award" for completing 50 years in the film industry.
- In 2011, he was honoured with "The ITA Scroll Of Honour" at the Indian Television Academy Awards.
- In 2017, he was honoured with the Dr Babasaheb Ambedkar Nobel award at Mumbai hosted by the International Human Rights Council.
- In 2020, he was honoured with a "Lifetime Achievement Award" by the state of New Jersey in United States.

== See also ==
- List of Hindi film actors
