= Dhongee =

- Directed by: Ashok Roy
- Written by: Prayag Raj
- Produced by: Kant Kumar
- Starring: Randhir Kapoor; Neetu Singh
- Music by: R. D. Burman
- Release date: 4 May 1979
- Country: India
- Language: Hindi

Dhongee is a 1979 Bollywood comedy drama film directed by Ashok Roy. The film stars Randhir Kapoor, Neetu Singh, Farida Jalal, Sujit Kumar, Premnath and Rakesh Roshan (in a special appearance).

== Cast ==
- Randhir Kapoor as Anand / John Lord
- Neetu Singh as Neelima Kapoor
- Farida Jalal as Geeta Khanna
- Sujit Kumar as Inspector Ravi Khanna
- Premnath as John Lord / Gorkha Bahadur
- Rakesh Roshan as Inspector Thapa (special appearance)
- Raj Mehra as Khanna
- Satyendra Kapoor as Kapoor
- Sajjan as Dinanath
- Asrani as Micheal
- Ram Mohan
- Randhir
- Habib
- Leena Das
- Rajan Haksar

== Music ==
All songs were composed by R. D. Burman and all lyrics were penned by Anand Bakshi.

- "Meri Bahena" – Kishore Kumar
- "Dil Chheena Chain Churaya" – Asha Bhosle
- "Haaye Re Haaye Tera Ghoonghta" – Kishore Kumar, Asha Bhosle
- "1 2 3 Go" – Kishore Kumar, Asha Bhosle
- "Woh Hai Ek Behroopiya" – Asha Bhosle, Kishore Kumar, Amit Kumar
