= Aashiana =

1974 film

Aashiana आशियाना
- Directed by: Syed Hussain
- Starring: Neetu Singh
- Release date: 14 August 1974
- Country: India
- Language: Hindi

Aashiana is a 1974 Bollywood drama film directed by Syed Hussain. The film stars Neetu Singh.

== Cast ==
- Neetu Singh
- Harindranath Chattopadhyay
- Ramesh Deo
- Gajanan Jagirdar (as Jagirdar)
- Roopesh Kumar
- Sunil Kumar
- Rehman

== Music ==
Composer: Hari–Arjun Lyrics: Yogesh

1. "Pyaar Pukare Singar Pukare" – Asha Bhosle, Mahendra Kapoor
2. "Man Mera Tera Jogi Aasha Puri Kab Hogi" – Mohammed Rafi
3. "Kaisi Mehfil Hai Ye Kaisa Mela Hai" – Mohammed Rafi
