= Ganga Meri Maa =

- Directed by: Shyam Rahlan
- Produced by: Joginder Luthra
- Starring: Shatrughan Sinha; Neetu Singh
- Music by: R. D. Burman
- Release date: 25 March 1983
- Running time: 2 h 30 min
- Country: India
- Language: Hindi

Ganga Meri Maa is a 1983 Indian Hindi language action - thriller film, stars Shatrughan Sinha, Neetu Singh, Amjad Khan, Danny Denzongpa, Nirupa Roy, Sujit Kumar, Madan Puri and Ranjeet. The music is by R. D. Burman.

== Plot ==
The film traces the journey of Ganga (Nirupa Roy), a tragedy-struck widow and how she reunites with her long-lost sons and to avenge the death of her husband.

== Cast ==
- Shatrughan Sinha as Ram
- Neetu Singh as Neetu
- Nirupa Roy as Ganga
- Amjad Khan as Mohan
- Danny Denzongpa as Malang
- Sujit Kumar as Prakash
- Madan Puri as Roopa Daku / Roopchand
- Ranjeet as Ranjeet
- Paintal as Allah Rakha

== Soundtrack ==
All songs are written by Gulshan Bawra. The soundtrack is available on Polydor Music India Ltd. now (Universal Music India).

Song	Singer
"Main Pyar Ki Kitaab Hoon"	Asha Bhosle
"Dil Aap Ko Jabse Diya Hai"	Asha Bhosle
"Andaz Tere Pyar Ka Haay Kitna Nirala"	Asha Bhosle
"Yaar Mil Gaya To Khuda Mil Gaya"	Asha Bhosle, Mohammed Rafi, Manna Dey
"Chahe Aage Dum Zum Peele" (Happy)	Manna Dey
"Chahe Aage Dum Zum Peele" (Sad)	Manna Dey
