= Neetu Kapoor =

Indian actress (born 1958)

- Kapoor at the Ramayana (2026) premiere
- Born: Harneet Kaur; 8 July 1958 (age 68); New Delhi, Delhi, India
- Other name: Neetu Singh
- Occupation: Actress
- Years active: 1966–1983; 2009–present
- Spouse: Rishi Kapoor (m. 1980; died 2020)
- Children: Riddhima Kapoor Sahni; Ranbir Kapoor
- Family: Kapoor family

Neetu Kapoor (née Singh; born Harneet Kaur; 8 July 1958) is an Indian actress who is known for appearing in Hindi films throughout the late 1960s, 1970s and early 1980s. In 2012, Kapoor was inducted into the Walk of the Stars, an entertainment hall of fame at Bandra Bandstand in Mumbai. She is the recipient of several accolades, including two Filmfare Award nominations.

Kapoor made her debut in the swashbuckler film Suraj (1966) and thereafter played a dual role in the romantic comedy Do Kaliyaan (1968). She began her transition to mature roles with the vigilante film Rickshawala (1973) and enjoyed a breakthrough with Nasir Hussain's masala film Yaadon Ki Baaraat (1973). She rose to prominence with lead roles in the crime drama Deewaar (1975), the thriller Khel Khel Mein (1975), the musical Kabhi Kabhie (1976), the masala Amar Akbar Anthony (1977) and the fantasy Dharam Veer (1977). Her performances in Parvarish (1977), Jaani Dushman (1979), Kaala Patthar (1979) and Yaarana (1981) won her praise and for Kaala Patthar, she was nominated for the Filmfare Award for Best Supporting Actress.

In 1980, she married actor Rishi Kapoor, with whom she had two children, including the actor Ranbir Kapoor. She went on a hiatus after appearing in the thriller film Ganga Meri Maa (1983). Nearly three decades later, she made her acting comeback with a minor role in the romantic comedy Love Aaj Kal (2009). She has since led the comedy film Do Dooni Chaar (2010) which won her a Zee Cine Award, the action film Besharam (2013), made a guest appearance in the romantic drama Jab Tak Hai Jaan (2012) and starred in the film Jugjugg Jeeyo (2022), which earned her another nomination for the Filmfare Award for Best Supporting Actress.

== Early life ==
Neetu Singh was born on 8 July 1958, as Harneet Kaur in New Delhi to Punjabi Sikh parents, Darshan Singh and Rajee Kaur Singh. Shortly after her father's death, she began acting as a child artist and was credited as Baby Sonia.

== Career ==
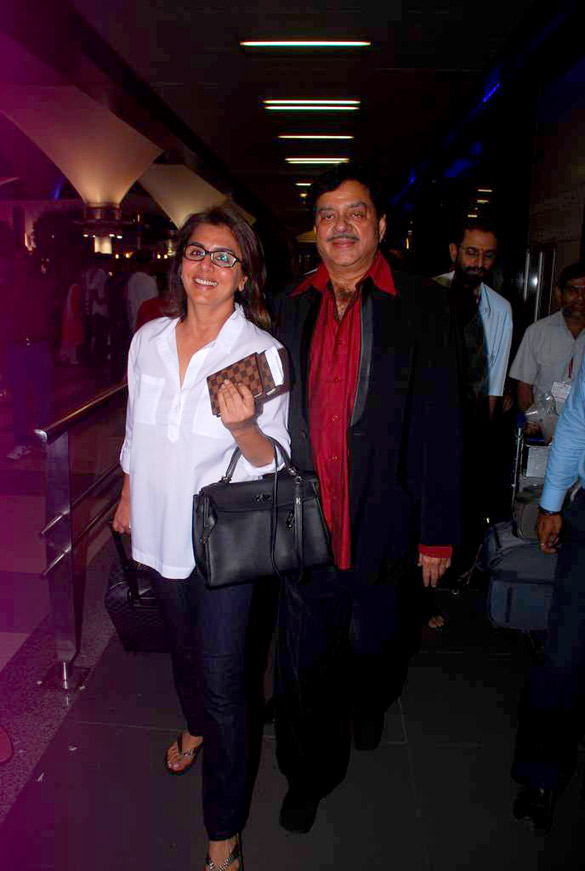
Kapoor with Shatrughan Sinha at IIFA Awards in 2012

Singh entered films uncredited child in Suraj (1966) starring Vyjayanthimala and Rajendra Kumar. This was followed by appearances in top-grossing films like Dus Lakh (1966), Do Kaliyaan (1968), Waris (1969), and Ghar Ghar Ki Kahani (1970). She was particularly appreciated for playing the double role of twin sisters in Do Kaliyaan.

In 1973, she played her first lead role opposite Randhir Kapoor in Rickshawala the remake of the Tamil film Rickshawkaran (1971). The same year Singh garnered attention for her appearance in the popular song "Lekar Hum Deewana Dil" in Nasir Hussain's blockbuster Yaadon Ki Baaraat (1973).

The romantic films Rafoo Chakkar (1975) and Khel Khel Mein (1975) established her and Rishi Kapoor as a popular on-screen pair, and they were subsequently cast together in several films. Khel Khel Mein in particular was propelled by the hit music of R.D. Burman.

Two prominent films that established Neetu Singh in mainstream cinema were Deewaar (1975) and Kabhi Kabhie (1976), both ensemble films directed by leading filmmaker Yash Chopra. In the action drama Deewaar, she played the vivacious love interest to Shashi Kapoor. The romantic drama Kabhi Kabhie, which featured her as an adopted daughter determined to find her birth mother, was one of the most acclaimed films of that time and continues to be remembered for its soundtrack by Khayyam and Sahir Ludhianvi. She enjoyed more commercial success in Shankar Dada (1976) opposite Shashi Kapoor and Maha Chor (1976) opposite Rajesh Khanna.

Singh's most successful release of 1977 was Amar Akbar Anthony, directed by veteran filmmaker Manmohan Desai, in which she played a young doctor in love with a singer played by Rishi Kapoor. In the same year, Desai also cast her in the adventure film Dharam Veer opposite Jeetendra and the crime drama Parvarish opposite Amitabh Bachchan. All three films ranked among the top five highest-grossing films of the year

For the next few years, Singh achieved success as solo female lead in films like Priyatama (1977), Maha Badmaash (1977), Dhongee (1979), and Chorni (1982). She was also featured in a number of multi-starters films like Adalat (1977), Kasme Vaade (1978), Jaani Dushman (1979), Kaala Patthar (1979), The Burning Train (1980), Yaarana (1981), and Teesri Aankh (1982) where her most successful associations were with Jeetendra, Amitabh Bachchan, and Randhir Kapoor. She earned her first nomination in the category Filmfare Award for Best Supporting Actress for Kaala Patthar.

After her marriage in 1980, she retired from acting. Her last film to be released was Ganga Meri Maa (1983). After a 25-year hiatus, Singh made her comeback with a cameo appearance in Imtiaz Ali's romantic comedy-drama Love Aaj Kal (2009), opposite her husband as the older version of his love interest in the film.

Singh's first lead role post-retirement was that of a middle-class Punjabi mother in Habib Faisal's Do Dooni Chaar (2010), which won the National Film Award for Best Feature Film in Hindi. She then made a special appearance in Yash Chopra's swan song Jab Tak Hai Jaan (2012), and also co-starred with her son Ranbir Kapoor in the comedy Besharam (2013). In 2022 she starred opposite Anil Kapoor in Jug Jugg Jeeyo. Her performance earned her a second nomination in the category Filmfare Award for Best Supporting Actress.

== Personal life ==
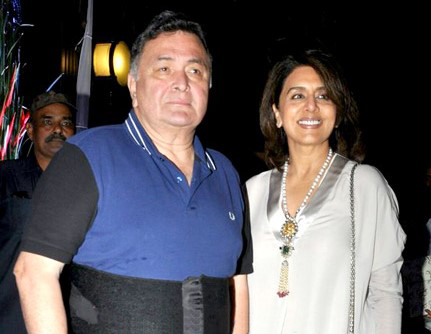
Kapoor with her husband Rishi Kapoor in 2017

While filming for Kabhie Kabhie, Singh and actor Rishi Kapoor became romantically involved off-screen and got married on 22 January 1980. Their children are Riddhima Kapoor Sahni (born 15 September 1980) and Ranbir Kapoor (born 28 September 1982). Riddhima is a jewellery designer who married Delhi-based industrialist Bharat Sahni on 25 January 2006. Their daughter is Samara Sahni (born 23 March 2011). Ranbir is an Indian actor who married actress Alia Bhatt on 14 April 2022. Their daughter is Raha Kapoor (born 6 November 2022).

Following a recurring battle with leukaemia and prolonged treatment in New York City, Rishi Kapoor died on 30 April 2020. During the filming of Jug Jugg Jeeyo, Singh tested positive for COVID-19 in Chandigarh in December 2020. However, she recovered after an isolation period, returning to the film's sets in early January 2021.

== Legacy ==
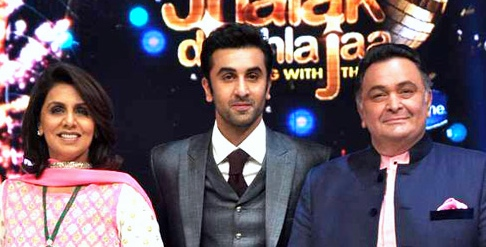
Singh with husband Rishi and son Ranbir

Singh is regarded as one of the most recognised actresses of Hindi cinema. In 2022, she was placed in Outlook India's "75 Best Bollywood Actresses" list. One of the highest paid actress of late 1970s, Singh appeared in Box Office India's "Top Actresses" list 1975 and 1977. She was inducted into the Walk of the Stars, at Bandra Bandstand, where her hand print was preserved under her married name Neetu Kapoor.

== Filmography ==
Key
†	Denotes films that have not yet been released

=== Films ===
- Note: all films are in Hindi, unless otherwise noted.

Year	Film	Role	Notes	Ref.
1966	Suraj	Geeta	Credited as Baby Sonia	
1966	Dus Lakh	Roopa	Credited as Baby Sonia	
1968	Do Kaliyan	Ganga and Jamuna	Dual role; credited as Baby Sonia	
1968	Do Dooni Chaar	Ban Devi	Credited as Baby Sonia	
1969	Waris	Munni	Credited as Baby Sonia	
1970	Pavitra Papi	Vidya	Credited as Baby Sonia	
1970	Ghar Ghar Ki Kahani	Roopa	Credited as Baby Sonia	
1973	Rickshawala	Kiran		
1973	Yaadon Ki Baaraat	Dancer	Special appearance	
1974	Shatranj Ke Mohre			
1974	Aashiana		Supporting role	
1974	Hawas	Neetu		
1974	Zehreela Insaan	Margaret		
1975	Andolan			
1975	Deewaar	Veera Narang		
1975	Khel Khel Mein	Nisha		
1975	Rani Aur Lalpari	Cinderella	Special appearance	
1975	Rafoo Chakkar	Ritu		
1975	Zinda Dil	Jyoti Chand		
1975	Sewak	Rasiya		
1976	Maha Chor	Neetu		
1976	Kabhi Kabhie	Pinky Kapoor		
1976	Sharafat Chhod Di Main Ne	Radha		
1976	Shankar Dada	Roopa Verma		
1976	Sawa Lakh Se Ek Ladaun	Qawalan	Punjabi film; special appearance	
1976	Dharti Mata		Gujarati film; special appearance	
1977	Adalat	Geeta Verma		
1977	Ab Kya Hoga	Chitralekha		
1977	Amar Akbar Anthony	Dr. Salma Ali		
1977	Dharam Veer	Roopa		
1977	Maha Badmaash	Seema Nathani and Pinky Nathani	Dual role	
1977	Priyatama	Dolly Sinha		
1977	Doosara Aadmi	Timsy Karan Saxena		
1977	Parvarish	Neetu Amit Singh		
1977	Zahreelee	Rekha		
1978	Kasme Vaade	Neeta		
1978	Anjane Mein	Rani		
1978	Pati Patni Aur Patni	Singer in "Tere Naam Tere Naam"	Cameo	
1978	Chakravyuha	Chhaya		
1978	Heeralaal Pannalaal	Neelam		
1979	Bhala Maanus	Meena		
1979	Aatish	Shanno		
1979	Jhoota Kahin Ka	Sheetal Khanna		
1979	The Great Gambler	Mala		
1979	Dhongee	Neelima Kapoor		
1979	Jaani Dushman	Gauri		
1979	Yuvraaj	Rajkumari Pallavi		
1979	Duniya Meri Jeb Mein	Neeta		
1979	Kaala Patthar	Channo		
1980	Kala Pani	Geeta		
1980	Dhan Daulat	Shanti		
1980	Chunaoti	Roshni		
1980	The Burning Train	Madhu		
1980	Choron Ki Baaraat	Anju		
1981	Waqt Ki Deewar	Soni		
1981	Khoon Ka Rishta	Sonia		
1981	Yaarana	Komal		
1981	Ek Aur Ek Gyarah	Rekha		
1982	Chorni	Deepa		
1982	Teesri Ankh	Nisha		
1982	Raaj Mahal	Rajkumari Ratna Singh		
1983	Ganga Meri Maa	Neetu		
1983	Jaane Jaan	Meena		
2009	Love Aaj Kal	Harleen Veer Singh Panesar	Cameo	
2010	Do Dooni Chaar	Kusum Santosh Duggal		
2012	Jab Tak Hai Jaan	Pooja	Special appearance	
2013	Besharam	Head Constable Bulbul		
2022	Jugjugg Jeeyo	Geeta Bheem Saini		
2026	Daadi Ki Shaadi	Vimla Ahuja		
TBA	Letters To Mr. Khanna †	TBA	Completed	

=== Television ===
Year	Title	Role	Notes
2022	Dance Deewane Juniors	Judge	TV debut
2023	The Romantics	Herself	
2024	Showtime	Herself	Guest
2024	Fabulous Lives of Bollywood Wives	Herself	
2025	Dining With the Kapoors	Herself	Television special

== Accolades ==
Year	Award	Category	Work	Result	Ref
1980	Filmfare Awards	Best Supporting Actress	Kaala Patthar	Nominated	
2011	Screen Awards	Best Actress	Do Dooni Chaar	Nominated	
2011	Stardust Awards	Best Actress	Do Dooni Chaar	Won	
2011	Zee Cine Awards	Best Lifetime Jodi (with Rishi Kapoor)	—N/a	Won	
2023	Filmfare Awards	Best Supporting Actress	Jugjugg Jeeyo	Nominated	

== In popular culture ==
- In Aditya Chopra's 2008 film Rab Ne Bana Di Jodi's song "Phir Milenge Chalte Chalte", Rani Mukerji dressed herself as Singh, as a tribute to her fashionable pigtails look from the 1980s.
