= Adalat (1977 film) =

1976 film directed by Narendra Bedi

- Directed by: Narendra Bedi
- Produced by: A. K. Nadiadwala
- Starring: Amitabh Bachchan; Waheeda Rehman; Neetu Singh
- Music by: Kalyanji-Anandji
- Release date: 7 January 1976
- Country: India
- Language: Hindi

Adalat (transl. Court) is a 1976 Indian Hindi-language action drama film directed by Narendra Bedi. The film stars Amitabh Bachchan in a double role as both father and son alongside Waheeda Rehman and Neetu Singh as the love interests.

Bachchan received a Filmfare nomination as the Best Actor, the only one for the film. The music is composed by Kalyanji-Anandji.

The film was later remade in Telugu as Sivamettina Satyam (1980), in Tamil as Vishwaroopam (1980) and in Malayalam as Aayudham (1982).

== Plot ==
Dharam Chand or Dharma, an amiable village farmer is thrilled when his wife, Radha gives birth to a baby boy, whom they decide to name Raju. Dharma heroically saves the lives of Ajit, Sujit and Suresh when they are being attacked by a tiger and they graciously offer him a job in Bombay whenever he decides to visit. When the village experiences an economic crisis and drought, the family migrates to Bombay, where Ajit makes Dharma the manager of his warehouse in the city.

Dharma is very honest with his job and courteous as well. After a few months, Dharma is tricked into signing a document which makes him the owner of the warehouse he is working at. One fine day the police raid his warehouse and he is arrested for trafficking gold and drugs. Being a village simpleton he doesn't understand the law and is easily implicated by his bosses for illegal activities carried out by them.

His pleas of innocence are ignored by the judge and he is sentenced to 18 months in jail plus an additional six months for contempt of court. Sujit visits his destitute family and offers money as compensation for the false implication of Dharma. His wife Radha refuses this, saying that she would not touch ill-gotten wealth. She toils very hard, working as a maid in the neighbourhood and stitching clothes for the locals. The hard work takes a toll on her health, as she is pregnant and one day she falls off the stairs due to weakness. She is admitted to the hospital and her sister-in-law Laxmi is the only person around. The doctor gives her a prescription. Laxmi finds herself helpless in this situation and goes to Sujit for money. Although Sujit gives her money, he rapes her before that. Laxmi, in a desolate state, reaches the hospital with the medicines. She hands over it to Dharma, who is out on parole and she dies in his arms (out of poison she had consumed earlier). When Dharma enters the ward, he finds out that their baby has died due to a fall Radha has suffered. He is totally heartbroken.

On his return, his bosses meet him and offer him anything he wishes in compensation. He rejects their offer saying that he would want his baby and sister as compensation. The prison and his hardships have now made him a ruthless man. His bosses sense vengeance and lodge a complaint to Inspector Khan, who had earlier arrested him. After a couple of days of his release, Dharma treads out late in the night from his home. His wife attempts to ask him where he is going, to which he replies that henceforth she should not ask him any questions. He straight away heads to Sujit's home and is able to get into his bedroom. Dharma demands all his money as compensation. Sujit agrees to it. Dharma then makes him write a confession letter, in case Sujit complains against him in the police. Sujit writes of all the crimes he has committed against Dharma and hands it over to him. Once this is done, he hangs Sujit from the fan and makes it appear as a suicide.

Inspector Khan straight away heads to Dharma's home and questions him. Dharma replies that unless he has any evidence against him, he should not question him. Radha understands that Dharma has killed Sujit, but keeps mum. In order to remove any suspicion about the robbery, Dharma hands over all the money to the owner of a hotel as a security deposit to lease his hotel. The deal is that Dharma would pay a paltry sum Rs. 500/month as the lease. A formal agreement is done. Inspector Khan questions the owner and suspects foul play, but due to proper paperwork and lack of evidence, he cannot implicate either of them.

Ajit, now scared of Dharma decides to kill him. He plants a bomb in his home to blow up his whole family. Alert Dharma is able to save his family, but is severely injured. Inspector Khan warns him that although he doesn't have any evidence, the path that Dharma has chosen would lead him back to his own destruction. Next, Dharma targets Suresh. He goes to his home and makes him drink excessive alcohol. Once Suresh is drunk, he gets all his money and information about their illegal business. Once that is done, he pushes him from the stairs to make it appear as an accident. Yet again, Khan visits him in the hospital and tries to reason with Dharma to dissuade him from his path. As Inspector Khan doesn't have any evidence, yet again he returns empty handed. Once out of the hospital, Dharma kills Ajit and starts trading with the peddler whom Ajit traded with. In order to keep the bad influence away from his kid, Dharma sends his son Raju to London for his further education. Years later, Raju (also Amitabh Bachchan) returns home and would like to marry Geeta Verma, whom he met in London, but is unable to meet his father's approval and comes into conflict. Dharma had promised his business partner that he would marry Raju to his daughter. His business partner Rajan was a former employee of Ajit. Rajan runs all the risk as Dharma is officially not a partner of the business and Rajan is facing all the court cases related to their illegal faction of the business. After a certain point, Dharma reconciles with his son and realises that his consent to marriage is equally important. He tells Rajan that he would not be able to fulfill his promise.

Rajan becomes distraught with this and the thought of betrayal starts slipping into his mind. Unknown to Dharma, Ajit is still alive and has returned and it is time to avenge the past by trying to murder Dharma at any price. Rajan sides with Ajit and attempts to kill Dharma, and in a failed attempt kills his wife instead. Dharma now realizes the bitter truth behind Khan's warning leading to his self-destruction. He then heads towards his end (duel with his rivals), in a bid to save his son's future.

== Cast ==
- Amitabh Bachchan as Thakur Dharam Chand "Dharma" / Raj "Raju" Thakur (Father and son double role)
- Waheeda Rehman as Radha
- Neetu Singh as Geeta Verma
- Anwar Hussain as Ajit Singh
- Pinchoo Kapoor as Verma
- Heena Kausar as Laxmi
- Kader Khan as Police Inspector Khan
- Marutirao Parab as Gulshan, Dharma's uncle
- Manorama as Nirupa, Dharma's aunt
- Viju Khote as Damodar
- Sujit Kumar as Sujit Singh
- K N Singh as K N Singh
- Manik Irani as Chandu Dada
- M.Rajan as Rajan
- Murad as Judge Rathore
- Mohan Sherry as Hotel Owner Sunil
- Akbar Khan as Himself (Guest appearance)
- Kartar Singh as Sikh man that carries away an injured Chandu Dada

== Soundtrack ==
All lyrics are written by Gulshan Bawra. The soundtrack is available on Polydor (now Universal Music India).

| Song | Singer |
|---|---|
| "Humka Aisa Waisa" | Mukesh |
| "Behna O Behna" | Mukesh |
| "Tumse Door Rehke Hum Ne Jana Pyar Kya Hai" | Lata Mangeshkar, Mohammed Rafi |
| "Do Din Ki Jawani" | K. J. Yesudas |

== Accolades ==
- Filmfare Award for Best Actor - Amitabh Bachchan - Nominated
