= Sahnewal =

- City

- Location in Punjab, India
- Coordinates: 30.8448°N 75.9758°E
- Country: India
- State: Punjab
- District: Ludhiana

Population (2011)
  - Total: 28,567

Languages
  - Official: Punjabi
- Time zone: UTC+5:30 (IST)
- Vehicle registration: PB-91

Sahnewal is a city and a municipal council in Ludhiana district in the Indian state of Punjab. It is the hometown of the popular Deol family of Bollywood and the birthplace of Sunny Deol. Ludhiana Airport is located near Sahnewal and provides civil and defense flights.

== Demographics ==
As per the 2011 census, the population was 22,484, of whom 11,989 were males and 10,495 were females, for an average sex ratio of 875.

== Notable persons ==
- Dharmendra, actor and politician
- Sunny Deol, actor and politician
