= Jyoti Cinema (Kolkata) =

- Location within Kolkata

General information
- Status: Inactive
- Type: Past Cinema hall, Heritage building
- Location: Lenin Sarani, 32/1 Lenin Sarani Dharmatala, Kolkata, India
- Coordinates: 22.5636°N 88.3535°E

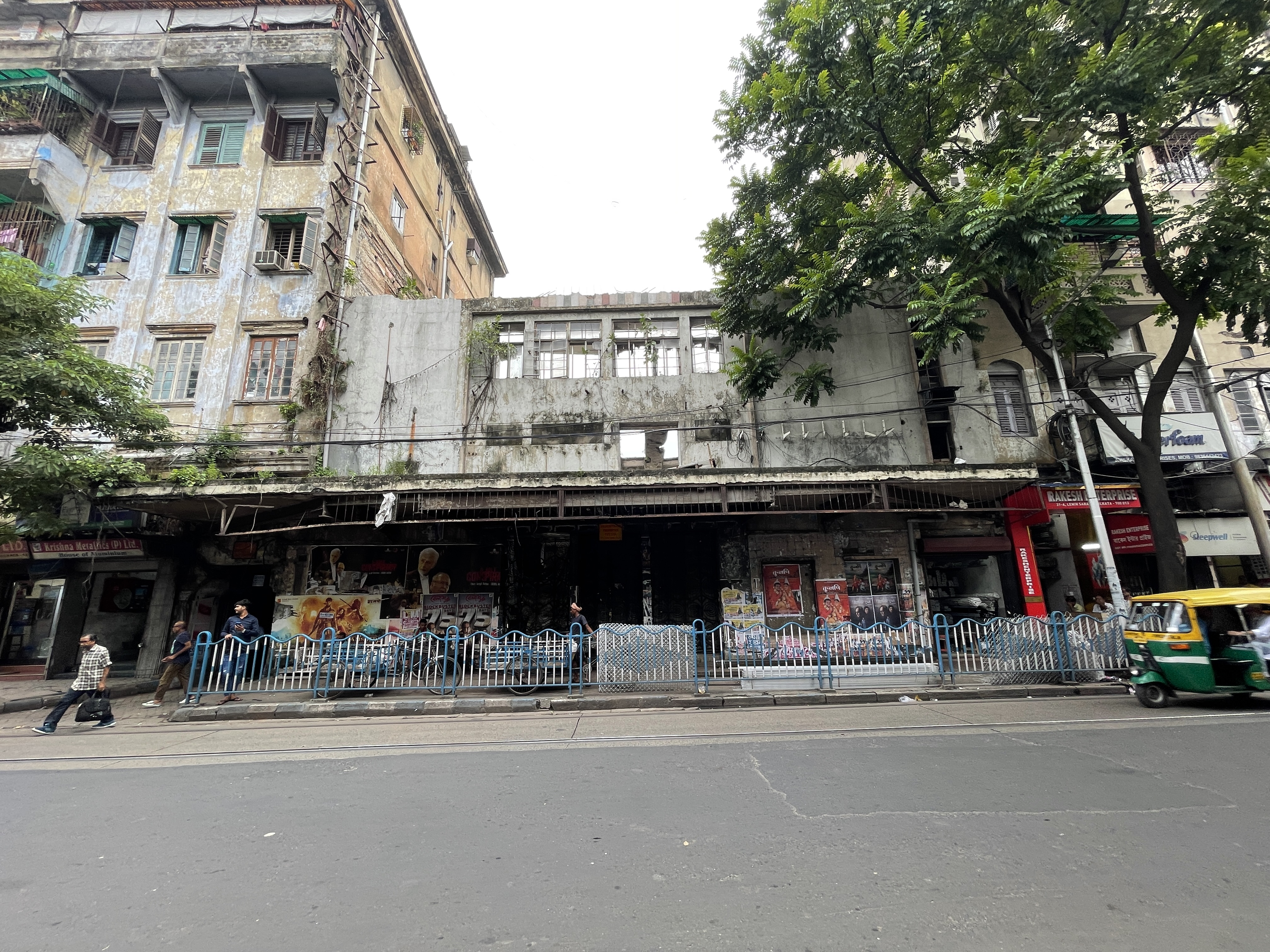
Jyoti Cinema in 2022

Jyoti Cinema is one of the most popular and oldest single-screen movie theatres of Kolkata, West Bengal. The hall is located in Lenin Sarani.

== History ==
The movie theatre was founded in mid 1930s. The theatre created a sensation by screening 70mm films in the 1970s. Hindi films and English Hollywood films used to be screened regularly. The theatre had a steady audience for its comfortable seating, good screen quality and stereophonic sound.

=== Current status ===
Around 2008, the theatre was suffering huge financial loss and because of this adverse condition, the theatre owners, Dutta and Mansatta, closed this theatre in 2008. As of July 2012, there is a distribution office on the ground floor, owned by B.K. Sethi and B.K. Khanna and a finance company in the second floor.

Sethi bought this closed hall in 2010. Later he commented– "We took ownership of Jyoti in 2010. We’re still deciding on what to do with the premises. Single-screen halls are fast closing down and this 10,000sq ft space is not large enough to convert into a mall or a multiplex. Parking is also a problem".

== See also ==
- Cinema in Kolkata
