= Manmohan Desai =

Indian filmmaker (1937-1994)

- Desai in 1986
- Born: 26 February 1937; Bombay, Bombay Province, British India
- Died: 1 March 1994 (aged 57); Bombay, Maharashtra, India
- Education: St. Xavier's College
- Occupations: Film director, producer
- Years active: 1957–1994
- Spouse: Jeevanprabha Gandhi
- Children: Ketan Desai
- Parents: Kikubhai Desai; Kalavati

Manmohan Desai (26 February 1937 – 1 March 1994) was an Indian film producer and director. He was one of the most successful filmmakers of the 70s and 80s. Desai was an influential and sought-after film director of Bollywood and a pioneer of making Masala films. His most successful films are Amar Akbar Anthony, Dharam Veer, Chacha Bhatija, Parvarish, Suhaag, Naseeb, Coolie and Mard.

== Family background ==
Manmohan Desai was of Gujarati ancestry. His father, Kikubhai Desai, was an Indian film producer and owner of Paramount Studios (later Filmalaya) from 1931 to 1941. His productions, mainly stunt films, included Circus Queen, Golden Gang, and Sheikh Challi. Manmohan Desai's elder brother, Subhash Desai, became a producer in the 1950s and gave Manmohan his first break in the Hindi film Chhalia (1960). Subhash later went on to produce Bluff Master, Dharam Veer, and Desh Premee with Manmohan as the director.

His wife was Jeevanprabha Desai. She died in April 1979. He was engaged to actress Nanda from 1992 until the time of his death in 1994. He had one son Ketan Desai who is still involved in the film industry. Ketan is married to Kanchan Kapoor, daughter of actor Shammi Kapoor and actress Geeta Bali.

On 1 March 1994, as per news Manmohan Desai fell from the balcony in Girgaon and died. There are doubts that he jumped to his death due to health issues

== Career ==
Manmohan Desai was known for his family-centered, action-song-and-dance films which catered to the tastes of the Indian masses and through which he achieved great success. His movies defined a new genre called masala films. A common theme in his films were the lost and found plot where family members would be separated and reunited.

== Filmography ==
Year	Movie name	Cast	Notes
1957	Janam Janam Ke Phere: Alias Sati Anapurna	Nirupa Roy, Mahipal	
1960	Chhalia	Raj Kapoor, Nutan, Pran, Rehman, Shobhna Samarth	
1963	Bluff Master	Shammi Kapoor, Saira Banu, Pran, Lalita Pawar	
1966	Budtameez	Shammi Kapoor, Sadhana, Manorama	
1968	Kismat	Biswajeet, Babita, Helen, Kamal Mehra	
1970	Sachaa Jhutha	Rajesh Khanna, Mumtaz, Vinod Khanna	
1972	Raampur Ka Lakshman	Randhir Kapoor, Rekha, Shatrughan Sinha	
1972	Bhai Ho To Aisa	Jeetendra, Hema Malini, Shatrughan Sinha	
1973	Aa Gale Lag Jaa	Shashi Kapoor, Sharmila Tagore, Shatrughan Sinha, Om Prakash	
1974	Roti	Rajesh Khanna, Mumtaz, Om Prakash, Vijay Arora, Nirupa Roy	
1977	Chacha Bhatija	Dharmendra, Hema Malini, Randhir Kapoor, Yogeeta Bali, Rehman	
1977	Amar Akbar Anthony	Amitabh Bachchan, Vinod Khanna, Rishi Kapoor, Parveen Babi, Neetu Singh, Shabana Azmi, Pran	
1977	Dharam Veer	Dharmendra, Zeenat Aman, Jeetendra, Neetu Singh, Pran	
1977	Parvarish	Amitabh Bachchan, Vinod Khanna, Shammi Kapoor, Neetu Singh, Shabana Azmi	
1979	Suhaag	Amitabh Bachchan, Shashi Kapoor, Rekha, Parveen Babi	
1981	Naseeb	Amitabh Bachchan, Shatrughan Sinha, Rishi Kapoor, Hema Malini, Reena Roy, Kim Yashpal	
1982	Desh Premee	Amitabh Bachchan, Shammi Kapoor, Sharmila Tagore, Hema Malini, Parveen Babi	
1983	Coolie	Amitabh Bachchan, Rishi Kapoor, Rati Agnihotri, Waheeda Rehman, Kader Khan	
1985	Mard	Amitabh Bachchan, Amrita Singh, Nirupa Roy, Dara Singh	
1988	Ganga Jamuna Saraswati	Amitabh Bachchan, Mithun Chakraborty, Meenakshi Sheshadri, Jaya Prada	
1989	Toofan	Amitabh Bachchan, Meenakshi Seshadri, Amrita Singh	Producer
1993	Anmol	Manisha Koirala, Rishi Kapoor, Johnny Lever	Producer
