= Dharam Veer (film) =

1977 Hindi film starring Dharmendra and Jeetendra

- Theatrical publicity poster
- Directed by: Manmohan Desai
- Screenplay by: Prayag Raj; K. B. Pathak
- Story by: Jeevanprabha M. Desai; Pushpa Sharma
- Dialogues by: Kader Khan
- Produced by: Subhash Desai
- Starring: Dharmendra; Zeenat Aman; Jeetendra; Neetu Singh; Pran; Jeevan; Ranjeet
- Cinematography: N. V. Srinivas
- Edited by: Kamlakar Karkhanis
- Music by: Laxmikant–Pyarelal
- Production company: S. S. Movietone
- Distributed by: Shemaroo Entertainment
- Release date: 1977
- Running time: 163 minutes
- Country: India
- Language: Hindi
- Box office: est. ₹130.4 million (India/UK); 32 million tickets (Soviet Union)

Dharam-Veer is a 1977 Hindi-language period action-drama film, directed by Manmohan Desai, produced by Subhas Desai under the Mehboob Studios and R.K. Studios banner, starring Dharmendra, Zeenat Aman, Jeetendra, Neetu Singh and Pran.

Its music was composed by Laxmikant–Pyarelal. Dharmendra's younger son Bobby Deol appears briefly playing the childhood version of his father's character.

Dharam-Veer takes place in a mythical kingdom and tells the tale of twin brothers Dharam and Veer played by Dharamendra and Jeetendra respectively, who get separated at birth but still become best friends in childhood, not knowing that they were real brothers, and later turn against each other due to various conspiracies of the villains and in the end reunite. The film became the second highest-grossing film of 1977.

== Plot ==
Maharani Meenakshi is a princess who, one day while out hunting, is rescued from a handful of attackers by a hunter-warrior, Jwala Singh, who lives alone in the jungle, accompanied only by his pet falcon, Sheroo. She offers him a reward for saving her life, but he only wants her hand in marriage, which her father had previously denied him.

During the night, they are awakened by another tiger, and Jwala goes to slay it. The tiger kills a villager, and Jwala puts his poncho over him to cover the dead body. He wrestles with the tiger, and they both fall over a cliff. The Princess sees the villager's dead body, thinks it is Jwala's, and goes into shock. Her father eventually marries her off into another royal family. Unbeknownst to Jwala, Meenakshi is pregnant with his child.

Satpal Singh, Meenakshi's brother, is told in a prophecy that he will be killed by his eldest nephew, Dharam, the future king of the land. To prevent this, he pleads poverty and moves in with his sister. The Queen gives birth to a healthy baby boy. Satpal takes the baby minutes after it is born and tosses it out of a window. Instead of falling to its death, however, the baby is caught by Sheroo, who flies him to his master. Jwala has been injured by a tiger and is being healed by a poor arrowsmith and his wife. They are childless and are pleased when the bird brings the baby, believing it to be a gift. They explain what happened to Jwala when he awakes, and he assents to them keeping and raising the child as their own. In the meanwhile, we learn that the Queen gave birth to twins, and Satpal only dealt with the firstborn. He is satisfied that the prophecy has been averted and now plans to help himself further by swapping his sister's baby with his own. While he is asleep, though, his wife swaps the children back.

As the children grow up, Satpal mistreats his own child, whom he believes to be the prince, and dotes on the prince, whom he thinks is his own son. The twins grow up. The elder, Dharam, grows up to be an arrowsmith like his foster father. The younger, Veer, is the crown prince. The boys become best friends and do not realize that this is because they are actually twin brothers.

Dharam is smitten with a princess, Pallavi, who gets angry when he proposes to her. She orders her troops to arrest Dharam and forces him to endure grueling and life-threatening trials. This includes making him participate in gladiatorial-style combat in her personal coliseum and torturing him by whipping. Eventually, Dharam escapes and kidnaps her. Then she stabs and badly injures him, but he lets her go. Later, an injured Dharam meets Jwala Singh, who is a master of swordsmanship. Jwala Singh cures him and later teaches Dharam the skills of swordsmanship, resulting in Dharam also becoming a master swordsman. Eventually, Pallavi realizes that she has fallen in love with Dharam, and the two declare their love for each other. Meanwhile, Veer also falls in love with a gypsy girl, Rupa.

Once the truth about his son is revealed to Satpal, he attempts to get rid of Veer. Before doing so, he realizes he must first break the bond between him and his staunchest supporter, Dharam. The Kingdom has "an eye for an eye" as the ultimate law. Dharam's father is accused of shoddily preparing a chariot wheel, which caused a soldier to lose his hands. In reality, Satpal and his son Ranjeet sabotaged it. The Queen is forced to chop off Dharam's father's hands in retribution. Dharam vows never to forgive Veer for this. Satpal and his son then kill Dharam's mother and use one of the prince's royal arrows. Dharam finds this and accuses the prince of the murder. In retribution for the mother he has lost, Dharam demands the Queen become his mother. Although Veer strongly protests, the Queen submits, stating that she must be seen to uphold the law or no one will. For this act, Veer begins to bitterly hate Dharam. Veer challenges Dharam to a duel, and Dharam accepts. Satpal and his son know that in this duel, Dharam will kill Veer, and they will get Dharam executed for Veer's murder. While the boys are fighting, the poor blacksmith reveals the story of how Dharam came to him and his wife. He shows the Queen the cloth the baby was wrapped in. The Queen realizes that this was, in fact, her own child, whom she believed to have been carried off by a falcon. She stops the fight just in time to stop the brothers from killing each other and reveals their relationship. Reunited, the brothers now face the challenge of disposing of the forces that Satpal Singh has gathered. In the end, Satpal is killed by Dharam.

== Cast ==
- Dharmendra as Dharam Singh
- Zeenat Aman as Princess Pallavi – Dharam’s nemesis, later girlfriend
- Jeetendra as Veer Singh – Dharam’s twin brother
- Neetu Singh as Roopa – Veer’s girlfriend
- Pran as Jwala Singh – Dharam’s and Veer’s father
- The Baaz as "wonder bird" Sheroo
- Indrani Mukherjee as Maharani Meenakshi – Dharam’s and Veer’s mother
- Jeevan as Satpal Singh
- Ranjeet as Ranjeet Singh
- Sujit Kumar as Rajkumar Sujan Singh
- Dev Kumar as Dev Singh
- Pradeep Kumar as Maharaja Pratap Singh
- B. M. Vyas as Rajguru
- Azaad Irani as Azad Singh
- D. K. Sapru as Maharaja
- Chand Usmani as Roopmati Singh
- Neelam as Dhano
- Master Bobby as Young Dharam Singh
- Hercules as Ramdin Lohar (Dharam’s adoptive father)

== Music and soundtrack ==
The music of the film was composed by Laxmikant–Pyarelal and the lyrics were penned by Anand Bakshi and Vitthalbhai Patel. The soundtrack of the movie proved to be as popular and successful as the movie itself.

#	Title	Singer(s)	Raga	Duration
1	"Hum Banjaaro ki Baat Mat Pucho ji"	Kishore Kumar, Lata Mangeshkar		06:42
2	"Mei Galiyon Ka Raja Tu Mehlo ki Rani"	Mohammed Rafi	Maru Bihag	05:30
3	"Band ho Mutthi To Laakh Ki"	Lata Mangeshkar, Asha Bhosle (this song is penned by Vithhalbhai Patel)		06:07
4	"O Meri Mehbooba"	Mohammed Rafi	Bhairavi	06:29
5	"Saat Ajube is Duniya"	Mohammed Rafi, Mukesh		06:12
6	"Saat Ajube is Duniya" (sad)	Mohammed Rafi and Nitin Mukesh		01:07

== Box office ==
In India, the film grossed ₹130 million (US$14.84 million). This made it the second highest-grossing film of 1977 at the Indian box office, after Amar Akbar Anthony.

Overseas in the United Kingdom, the film had 23 shows in 5 cities. Driven by the success of Mohammad Rafi's songs, the film grossed £50,000 in the UK, equivalent to ₹438,140 (US$50,001.71).

Combined, the film grossed an estimated ₹130.44 million (US$14.89 million) in India and the United Kingdom.

In addition, the film sold 32 million tickets in the Soviet Union.
