= List of non-Hindi songs recorded by Udit Narayan =

Udit Narayan is a playback singer who works in Bollywood and whose songs have been featured mainly in Hindi language, Nepali, Telugu and Kannada language movies. He has won three National Film Awards and five Filmfare Awards. He is the only male singer in the history of the Filmfare Awards to have won over three decades (winning in the 1980s, 1990s, and 2000s). As many as 21 of his tracks feature in BBC's "Top 40 Bollywood Soundtracks of all time".

== Kannada film songs ==
Year	Film	Song	Composer(s)	Writer(s)
1999	Upendra	"Mtv Subbulakshmige"	Gurukiran	
2001	Premakke Sai	"Anda Ninna Hesara"	Mani Sharma	
2001	Sundarakanda	"Myna Myna"	M. M. Keeravani	
2002	Appu	"Baare Baare"	Gurukiran	
2002	Appu	"Ellinda Aarambhavo"	Gurukiran	
2002	Chandu	"Saddillade Moodide Prema"	Gurukiran	
2002	Chandu	"Kanyakumariye"	Gurukiran	
2002	Devaru Varavanu Kotre	"Mira Mira Gombe"	K. Kalyan	
2002	Friends	"Thakadimi Thakadimi"	Ghantadi Krishna	
2002	Friends	"Savira Kanasina"	Ghantadi Krishna	
2002	Hollywood	"Choo Bide"	Gurukiran	Upendra
2002	Hollywood	"Prema Prema"	Gurukiran	Upendra
2002	Nata	"Gaganadalli Chukkigalu"	Gurukiran	
2002	Parva	"Antharanga Aasegala"	Hamsalekha	
2002	Parva	"Dolu Dolu Dangura"	Hamsalekha	
2002	Roja	"Snehake"	Hamsalekha	
2002	Thuntata	"Kathura Manpura"	Gurukiran	
2003	Abhi	"Sum Sumne"	Gurukiran	
2003	Abhi	"Ee Nanna Kannane"	Gurukiran	
2003	Chigurida Kanasu	"Aaha Enidenidenu"	V. Manohar	
2003	Chigurida Kanasu	"Ninna Kanda Kshana"	V. Manohar	
2003	Don	"Sundari Sundari"	Sadhu Kokila	
2003	Game	"Baare Baare Menake"	Babji - Sandeep	
2003	Gokarna	"Aaseye Dukhakke Moola"	Gurukiran	
2003	Gokarna	"Jwara Illade"	Gurukiran	
2003	Kariya	"Nannali Naanilla"	Gurukiran	
2003	Katthegalu Saar Katthegalu	"Allalle Allalle"	Hamsalekha	
2003	Kiccha	"Nanna Kasthuri"	Hamsalekha	
2003	Kutumba	"Mujhe Kuch Kuch Hogaya"	Gurukiran	
2003	Kutumba	"Alukku Balukina"	Gurukiran	
2003	Laali Haadu	"Preethige Ondu"	Sadhu Kokila	
2003	Namma Preethiya Ramu	"Naa Kano Lokavanu"	Ilaiyaraaja	
2003	Namma Preethiya Ramu	"Duddilde Hodaru"	Ilaiyaraaja	
2003	Preethisale Beku	"Dhamani Dhamaniyali"	Chaitanya	
2003	Sacchi	"Enagide Nange"	Gurukiran	
2003	Sri Ram	"Rama Ayo Rama"	Gurukiran	
2003	Sri Ram	"Suma Sumana"	Gurukiran	
2003	Vijaya Simha	"Baare Binkamma"	Gurukiran	
2004	Apthamitra	"Pata Pata"	Gurukiran	
2004	Cheppale	"Yen Ivagna"	R. P. Patnaik	
2004	Friendship	"Navile O Navile"	Mahesh	
2004	Kalasipalya	"Pete Pete Rap"	Venkat Narayan	
2004	Kanchana Ganga	"Ninna Mareyalare"	S. A. Rajkumar	
2004	Malla	"Olagirodhu"	V. Ravichandran	
2004	Maurya	"Haadali Karunaadali"	Gurukiran	
2004	Maurya	"Pilla Pilla"	Gurukiran	
2004	Nalla	"Huchchu Prithi"	Venkat Narayan	
2004	Ok Saar Ok	"Devarane Cheluve"	Nag - Mahesh	
2004	Sahukara	"Malayaliya Pada"	Rajesh Ramanath	
2004	Sardara	"Madhana Madhana"	Venkat Narayan	
2004	Thali Kattuva Shuba Vele	"Olavina Madhuvana"	Rajan Gurung	
2004	Y2K	"Suryane Niyamava"	Sadhu Kokila	
2005	Aadi	"Hele O Gelathi"	Gurukiran	
2005	Aakash	"Habba Habba"	R. P. Patnaik	
2005	Anna Thangi	"Dum Dum Dum"	Hamsalekha	
2005	Auto Shankar	"Kachhi Kachhi"	Gurukiran	
2005	Ayya	"Tabla Tabla"	V. Ravichandran	
2005	Ayya	"Ee Prema"	V. Ravichandran	
2005	Gowramma	"Ondu Saari"	S. A. Rajkumar	
2005	Gowramma	"Baninda Jaari"	S. A. Rajkumar	
2005	Inspector Jhansi	"Nan Love Made"	Dilip Sen - Sameer Sen	
2005	Kashi from Village	"Ye Kicchha Kicchha"	Koti	
2005	Kashi from Village	"Goli Maaro"	Koti	
2005	Namma Basava	"Andondittu Kaala"	Gurukiran	
2005	News	"Good Morning"	Gurukiran	
2005	News	"Munjaneya"(Version l)	Gurukiran	
2005	Rakshasa	"Gooli Gooli Gurayisu"	Sadhu Kokila	
2005	Rishi	"Yenendu Naa Helalaare"	Gurukiran	
2005	Shashtri	"Sumne Sumne"	Sadhu Kokila	Madhuvati
2005	Siri Chandana	"Thakadimi Thom Thana"	S. A. Rajkumar	
2005	Swamy	"Minchina Kannina"	Gurukiran	
2005	Swamy	"Jhum Antha"	Gurukiran	
2005	Sye	"Koo Koo Maina"	Gurukiran	
2005	Valmiki	"Chumma Chumma"	Gurukiran	
2006	Chellata	"Ishtaano Ishtaano"	Gurukiran	
2006	Chellata	"Pataaki Pataaki"	Gurukiran	
2006	Gandugali Kumara Rama	"Ee Jeeva Jeeva"	Gurukiran	
2006	Gopi	"Rangina Halli"	Mani Sharma	
2006	Hatavadi	"Thai Thai"	V. Ravichandran	
2006	Honeymoon Express	"Le Le Swalpa"	R. P. Patnaik	
2006	Julie	"Ee Hadu Modala Hadu"	Rajesh Ramanath	
2006	Kallarali Hoovagi	"Wah Wah Khana"	Hamsalekha	
2006	Mohini 9886788888	"Ranga Ranga"	Hamsalekha	
2006	Mungaru Male	"Kunidu Kunidu Baare"	Mano Murthy	
2006	O Priyathama	"Najooka Najooka"	Valisha - Sandeep	
2006	Ramya Chaitrakala	"Moodana Madilaage"	S Shyama Sunder	
2006	Ravi Sastri	"Mutthu Mutthu"	Rajesh Ramanath	
2006	Ravi Sastri	"Sangeetha"	Rajesh Ramanath	
2006	Student	"Koose Koose Aye Koose"	R. P. Patnaik	
2006	Student	"Ee Ninna Kaalgajje"	R. P. Patnaik	
2006	Thangigagi	"Bittu Bittu"	Sadhu Kokila	
2007	Dheemantha Manushya	"Tumbihe Yedeyalli"	A Karthikraj	
2007	Ee Bandhana	"Chanda Nanna Chandramukhi"	Mano Murthy	
2007	Gandana Mane	"Jaage Mallige"	V. Manohar	
2007	Gandana Mane	"Kuhu Kuhu Kogile"	V. Manohar	
2007	Krishna	"Gollara Golla"	V. Harikrishna	
2007	Kshana Kshana	"Ondu Kotre Eradu"	R. P. Patnaik	
2007	Masti	"Kannalide"	Gurukiran	
2007	Milana	"Anthu Inthu"	Mano Murthy	
2007	Naanu Neenu Jodi	"Navule Navule"	Hamsalekha	
2007	Ninade Nenapu	"Yare Sakhi"	Mahesh Patel	
2007	Poojari	"Muddu Mudada"	Abhimann Roy	
2007	Road Romeo	"Kannalle Muduthiya"	K M Indra	
2007	Thamashegagi	"Thamashegagi"	R. P. Patnaik	
2008	Beladingalagi Baa	"Saari Saari Naa Helivenu"	Gurukiran	
2008	Bindaas	"Gubbacchi Goodinalli"	Gurukiran	Kaviraj
2008	Dheemaku	"Huchha Annu"	Arjun Janya	
2008	Gaalipata	"Aaha Ee Bedaru Bombege"	V. Harikrishna	
2008	Gange Bare Thunge Bare	"Nadiyaagi"	Sadhu Kokila	
2008	Haage Summane	"Naanenu Nambodilla"	Mano Murthy	
2008	Hrudaya I Miss U	"Dhamani Dhamani"	Ram Shankar	
2008	Indra	"Gum Gum"	V. Harikrishna	
2008	Janumada Gelathi	"Noorentu Maathu"	V. Manohar	
2008	Kaamannana Makkalu	"Chee Chee Chee"	Vidyasagar	
2008	Maharshi	"Kalyana Rekhe"	Sri Murali	
2008	Meravanige	"Elliruve Yaare Naanu"	V. Manohar	
2008	Mussanje Maathu	"O Hrudaya"	Sridhar V.Sambhram	
2008	Paramesha Panwala	"Tuntaraama Puttaraama"	V. Harikrishna	
2008	Premigaagi Naa	"Dilnal Love Bandre"	Rajesh Ramanath	
2008	Sangaathi	"Gullalo Gullalo"	Hamsalekha	
2008	Satya in Love	"Golla Golla"	Gurukiran	
2008	Vamshi	"Mayagaathi"	R. P. Patnaik	
2009	Bhagyada Balegara	"Madhu Magalu"	Ilaiyaraaja	
2009	Ee Sambhashane	"Jumthalaka Jum"	V. Manohar	
2009	Jaaji Mallige	"Chitte Chitte"	Sadhu Kokila	
2009	Meghave Meghave	"Nin Tutige Ondsala"	V. Harikrishna	
2009	Nanda	"Ninna Kangalalli"	V. Manohar	
2009	Nirudyogi	"Devathe Devathe"	A T Raveesh	
2009	Raam	"Nanna Thutuyalli"	V. Harikrishna	
2009	Rajani	"Barthiya Barthiya"	Hamsalekha	
2009	Yuvah	"O Thaavare"	Gurukiran	
2010	Cheluveye Ninna Nodalu	"Seere Nerige"	V. Harikrishna	
2010	Chirru	"Shambo Shiva Shankara"	Giridhar Diwan	
2010	Chirru	"Olavanu Helu"	Giridhar Diwan	
2010	Jothegara	"Jarthaari Seere"	Sujeeth Shetty	
2010	Mylari	"Sukumari"	Gurukiran	
2010	Preethiya Nee Shashwathana	"Nooru Nooru Premigalalli"	K. Kalyan	
2010	Zamana	"Thanmaya Naanu"	Karthik Raja	
2011	Bhadra	"Bangari Entha Anda"	Shree Guru	
2011	Boss	"Jaane janeman"	V. Harikrishna	
2011	Ee Sanje	"Hangantheeya"	Jai Shiva	
2011	Gun	"Ella Ballava"	Ronnie Rophel	
2011	Maryade Ramanna	"Pori Pori"	M. M. Keeravani	
2011	Onde Ondu Sari	"Kogile Oh Kogile"	M Rajesh	
2011	Rama Rama Raghu Rama	"Neenondu Benkipottanna"	V. Harikrishna	
2011	Uyyale	"Hagalu Ninnade"	Ricky Kej	
2012	Parie	"Mugilina Maathu"	Veer Samarth	Sudhir Attavar
2012	Yaare Koogadali	"Hello 1 2 3 Mike Testing"	V. Harikrishna	Yogaraj Bhat
2013	Aantharya	"Ee Nasheyu"	Giridhar Divan	
2013	Bangari	"Aasepattu"	A M Neel	
2013	Dasavala	"Ondu Eradu Mooru"	Gurukiran	
2013	Jataayu	"Phala Phala"	Vijay Chandra	
2013	Agamya	"Nee Sanihake"	Chinmay M. Rai	B. K. Mahesh
2013	Lakshmi	"Come Come Kamanna"	Gurukiran	
2013	Lakshmi	"Neenene Neenene"	Gurukiran	
2015	Katte	"Sanihake"	S. A. Rajkumar	
2017	Aadu Aata Aadu	"Hudugi Laka Laka"	V. Manohar	
2017	Jani	"Ellellu Neene Neene"	Jassie Gift	

== Tamil film songs ==
Year	Film	Song	Composer	Co-singer(s)
1994	Kaadhalan	"Kadhalikum Pennin"	A. R. Rahman	S. P. Balasubrahmanyam, S.P.B. Pallavi
1995	Muthu	"Kuluvalilae"	A. R. Rahman	K. S. Chithra, Kalyani Menon, G. V. Prakash Kumar
1996	Mr. Romeo	"Romeo Aatam"	A. R. Rahman	Hariharan
1996	Coimbatore Mappillai	"Coimbatore Mappillaikku"	Vidyasagar	Sadhana Sargam
1997	Ratchagan	"Soniya Soniya"	A. R. Rahman	Unnikrishnan, Harini
1998	Velai	"Kunnooru Poochandi"	Yuvan Shankar Raja	Sujatha Mohan
1998	Kannedhirey Thondrinal	"Eswara"	Deva	
1998	Kadhala Kadhala	"Kaasumaeley"	Karthik Raja	Kamal Haasan
1998	Naam Iruvar Namakku Iruvar	"Aiylesaa Aiylesaa"	Karthik Raja	Pop Shalini
1998	Naam Iruvar Namakku Iruvar	"Hello Enthan Kadhala"	Karthik Raja	Sadhana Sargam, Kavita Paudwal
2000	Anbudan	"Idhu Kadhal Airways"	Jai	
2000	Rhythm	"Ayyo Pathikiche"	A. R. Rahman	Vasundhara Das
2001	Shahjahan	"Achacho Punnagai"	Mani Sharma	Kavita Krishnamurthy
2001	Samudhiram	"Vidiya Vidiya"	Sabesh–Murali	Sadhana Sargam
2001	Alli Thanda Vaanam	"Kaasu Kaasu"	Vidyasagar	Sruthi Unnikrishnan
2001	Ullam Kollai Poguthae	"Puyaley Puyaley"	Karthik Raja	
2002	Run	"Kadhal Pisase"	Vidyasagar	Sujatha Mohan
2002	Bhagavathi	"Allu Allu"	Deva	
2002	Villain	"Pathinettu Vayasil"	Vidyasagar	Sadhana Sargam
2003	Dhool	"Ithanondu Muthathila"	Vidyasagar	Sowmya Raoh
2003	Anbe Sivam	"Elae Machi" (Version l)	Vidyasagar	Kamal Haasan
2003	Anbe Sivam	"Elae Machi" (Version ll)	Vidyasagar	Tippu
2003	Aahaa Ethanai Azhagu	"Nilavile Nilavile"	Vidyasagar	Madhushree
2003	Anjaneya	"Vennila Vennila"	Mani Sharma	Harini
2003	Dum	"Kannamma Kannamma"	Deva	Anuradha Sriram
2003	Kadhal Kisu Kisu	"Aalum Velum"	Vidyasagar	Tippu
2003	Success	"Vothu Konjam Vothu"	Deva	
2003	Paarai	"Aeroplane Parakkudhu"	Sabesh–Murali	
2003	Anbe Un Vasam	"Enga Pora"	Dhina	
2003	Thiruda Thirudi	"Vandar Kuzhazhi"	Dhina	Radhika Thilak, Mimicry Senthil
2003	Thirumalai	"Vaadiyamma Jakkamma"	Vidyasagar	
2003	Thithikudhe	"Iraq Yutham"	Vidyasagar	Anuradha Sriram
2003	Vaseegara	"Venaam Venaam"	S. A. Rajkumar	Sadhana Sargam
2003	Winner	"Endhan Uyir Thozhiyae"	Yuvan Shankar Raja	Yuvan Shankar Raja
2003	Winner	"Kozhi Kokkara Kozhi"	Yuvan Shankar Raja	Prashanthini
2003	Soori	"Vaanam Kuninthu"	Deva	Srimathumitha
2004	Aai	"Arjuna Arjuna"	Srikanth Deva	Sophia Salam
2004	M. Kumaran son of Mahalakshmi	"Ayyo Ayyo"	Srikanth Deva	Pop Shalini
2004	Ghilli	"Kokarakokarako"	Vidyasagar	Sujatha Mohan
2004	Kuthu	"Saapida Vaada"	Srikanth Deva	Malathy Lakshman
2004	Madurey	"Bambarakannu"	Vidyasagar	Srilekha Parthasarathy
2004	Ramakrishna	"Enakku Aambalaina"	Deva	Anuradha Sriram
2005	London	"Atho Atho"	Vidyasagar	Pop Shalini, Premgi Amaren
2005	Sivakasi	"Ada Ennatha Solvenungo"	Srikanth Deva	Anuradha Sriram
2005	Manthiran	"Thiruchi Pakkam"	Dhina	
2005	Ji	"Kiliye Kiliye"	Vidyasagar	Sujatha Mohan
2005	Bambara Kannaley	"Bambara Kannaley"	Srikanth Deva	Sadhana Sargam
2005	Kana Kandaen	"Aiyya Ramaiah"	Vidyasagar	
2005	Ponniyin Selvan	"Kadhal Poonga"	Vidyasagar	Sujatha Mohan
2005	Majaa	"Hey Pangaali"	Vidyasagar	Tippu, Manikka Vinayagam
2006	Dharmapuri	"Engamma Kuthamma"	Srikanth Deva	Anuradha Sriram
2006	Krrish	"Sokki Sokki"	Rajesh Roshan	Shreya Ghoshal
2006	Kedi	"KD Paiya"	Yuvan Shankar Raja	Shreya Ghoshal
2006	Nenjirukkum Varai	"Kichu Kichu Moottadhada"	Srikanth Deva	Saindhavi
2006	Thagapansamy	"Paniyaram Suttu"	Srikanth Deva	Malathy Lakshman
2007	Muruga	"Pollatha Kirukku"	Karthik Raja	Shreya Ghoshal
2007	Nenjai Thodu	"Ulalela"	Srikanth Deva	Srilekha Parthasarathy
2007	Sivaji	"Sahana"	A. R. Rahman	Chinmayi
2008	Yaaradi Nee Mohini	"Engeyo Paartha"	Yuvan Shankar Raja	
2008	Yaaradi Nee Mohini	"Nenjai Kasakki"	Yuvan Shankar Raja	Suchitra
2008	Kuruvi	"Thaen Thaen"	Vidyasagar	Shreya Ghoshal
2008	Padikkathavan	"Raangi Rangamma"	Mani Sharma	Malathy Lakshman
2008	Pazhani	"Thiruvaroor Therae"	Srikanth Deva	Anuradha Sriram
2008	Tharagu	"Poda Poda"	Bharani	
2008	Sandai	"Maduraikara Ponnu"	Dhina	Anuradha Sriram
2008	Thiruvannamalai	"Adiyae"	Srikanth Deva	Suchitra
2008	Vedha	"Ayyo Azhage"	Srikanth Deva	Pop Shalini
2008	Durai	"Unnai Maathiri"	D. Imman	Shreya Ghoshal
2009	Aarumaname	"Naan Kadhalikiren"	Srikanth Deva	Shweta Mohan
2009	Arumugam	"Salona"	Deva	Sonu Kakkar
2009	Eesa	"Vettaruva Kannazhagi"	Haran	Haran
2009	Guru En Aalu	"Chellame Chellamae"	Srikanth Deva	
2009	Thoranai	"Vaa Chellam"	Mani Sharma	
2009	Kadhalna Summa Illai	"Ennamo Seidhaai"	Mani Sharma	
2009	Kanden Kadhalai	"Venpanju"	Vidyasagar	Karthik
2009	Mariyadhai	"Inbamay"	Vijay Antony	Mahathi
2009	Suriyan Satta Kalloori	"Kalaai Kalaai Kalaaikkira"	Deva	Janani Bharadwaj
2009	Naan Avanillai 2	"Baaga Unnara"	D. Imman	SuVi
2010	Thottupaar	"Aadi Maasa Kaathadikka"	Srikanth Deva	Anuradha Sriram
2010	Aattanayagann	"Chekka"	Srikanth Deva	Anuradha Sriram
2010	Madrasapattinam	"Vaama Duraiyamma"	G. V. Prakash Kumar	Cochin Haneefa, Amy Jackson
2010	Kaadhal Solla Vandhen	"Oru Vaanavilin Pakathiley"	Yuvan Shankar Raja	
2010	Vallakottai	"Magadheera" (Version ll)	Dhina	Saindhavi
2011	Siruthai	"Chellam Vada Chellam"	Vidyasagar	Roshan, Surmukhi Raman
2011	Rowthiram	"Adiye Un Kangal"	Prakash Nikki	Sadhana Sargam
2011	Puli Vesham	"Varaen Varaen"	Srikanth Deva	Madhushree
2012	Maasi	"Unakkaga"	Dhina	Sowmya Raoh
2012	Marupadiyum Oru Kadhal	"Salakku Salakku"	Srikanth Deva	Vijay Yesudas
2013	Aadhi Bhagavan	"Kaatriley Nadanthene"	Yuvan Shankar Raja	Shweta Pandit
2013	Aadhalal Kadhal Seiveer	"Alaipaayum Nenjiley"	Yuvan Shankar Raja	
2013	Samar	"Vellai Maiyil"	Yuvan Shankar Raja	Shweta Mohan
2013	Pattathu Yaanai	"Raja Naandhane"	S. Thaman	Haricharan
2014	Sooran	"Thappae Thappila"	PB Balaji	Rita
2015	Idhu Enna Maayam	"Machi Machi"	G. V. Prakash Kumar	Devan Ekambaram, Navin Iyer
2022	DSP	"Nalla Irumaa"	D. Imman	Senthil Ganesh, Maalavika Sundar
2023	Om Vellimalai	"Keechan"	N. R. Raghunanthan	Priya Himesh
2023	Angaaragan	"Thaaku Thakkara"	Ku Karthik	

== Telugu film songs ==
Year	Film	Song	Composer(s)	Co-artist(s)
1995	Premikudu	"Andhamaina Premarani"	A. R. Rahman	S. P. Pallavi, S. P. Balasubrahmanyam
1996	Mr Romeo	"Romeo Natyam Ches"	A. R. Rahman	Hariharan
1997	Rakshakudu	"Soniya Soniya Sweet"	A. R. Rahman	P. Unnikrishnan, Harini
1998	Choodalani Vundi	"Raamma Chilakamma"	Mani Sharma	Swarnalatha
1998	Ganesh	"Ayyo Rama"	Mani Sharma	
1998	Abhishekam	"Surabhi Sura"	S. V. Krishna Reddy	K. S. Chithra
1999	Bharat Ratna	"Choti Choti Dongatanam"	Vandemataram Srinivas	
1999	Krishna Babu	"Sakiya Mast"	Koti	Sujatha Mohan
1999	Krishna Babu	"Prema Paata"	Koti	Sujatha Mohan
1999	Anaganaga Oka Ammai	"Swathi Chinuukaaa"	Mani Sharma	Sujatha Mohan
1999	Sneham Kosam	"Kaikaluri Kannepilla"	S. A. Rajkumar	Kavita Krishnamurti
1999	Yamajathakudu	"Hey Santa"	Vandemataram Srinivas	Swarnalatha
1999	Swapnalokam	"Amitabachan"	Vandemataram Srinivas	Sharada
1999	Swapnalokam	"Beautiful Be"	Vandemataram Srinivas	
1999	Iddaru Mitrulu	"Chang Chan"	Mani Sharma	Harini
1999	Manasulo Maata	"Eswara Ningi"	S. V. Krishna Reddy	
1999	Manasulo Maata	"Preminchu Okkasari"	S. V. Krishna Reddy	S. P. Balasubrahmanyam
1999	Manasulo Maata	"Anthaa Mari"	S. V. Krishna Reddy	Sunandha
1999	Samarasimha Reddy	"Andala Aada Bomma"	Mani Sharma	Sujatha Mohan
1999	Sultan	"O Kaliki Rama"	Koti	K. S. Chithra
1999	Sultan	"Shabba Shabba"	Koti	K. S. Chithra
1999	Rajakumarudu	"Godari Gattupaina"	Mani Sharma	Kavita Krishnamurti
1999	Swayamvaram	"Keeravani Ragamlo"	Vandemataram Srinivas	Swarnalatha
2000	Annayya	"Gusa Gusale"	Mani Sharma	Sujatha Mohan
2000	Vamsi	"Koyilamma"	Mani Sharma	Sujatha Mohan
2000	Shiva Shambo Mahadeva	"Suryodayana Shivanamam"	SR Ramarao	
2000	Postman	"Baava Baava"	Vandemataram Srinivas	Swarnalatha
2000	Postman	"Manushullo Gentlemanu"	Vandemataram Srinivas	Swarnalatha
2000	Postman	"Lahiri Lahiri Lahiri"	Vandemataram Srinivas	K. S. Chithra
2000	Manasunna Maaraju	"Maaga Maasama"	Vandemataram Srinivas	K. S. Chithra
2000	Manasunna Maaraju	"Nenu Gaali Gopuram"	Vandemataram Srinivas	Anuradha Paudwal
2000	Jayam Manadera	"Hindusthanlo Vontelakante"	Vandemataram Srinivas	Jaspinder Narula
2000	Tirumala Tirupathi Venkatesa	"Janaku Janaakuree"	Vandemataram Srinivas	Anuradha Paudwal
2000	NTR Nagar	"Aakasha Veedheeloo"	Vandemataram Srinivas	
2000	Kshemamga Velli Labhamga Randi	"Lovvuku Age"	Vandemataram Srinivas	
2000	Kshemamga Velli Labhamga Randi	"Appu Chesee"	Vandemataram Srinivas	
2000	Ammo! Okato Tareekhu	"Ne Akupacha"	Vandemataram Srinivas	
2000	Adavi Chukka	"Evaru Annaramma"	Vandemataram Srinivas	
2000	Muthyam	"Nooziveedu Mamidi"	Vandemataram Srinivas	
2000	Azad	"Sonare Sona"	Mani Sharma	
2000	Chiru Navvutho	"Andam Nee Pera"	Mani Sharma	
2000	Rhythm	"Ayyo Paduchichi"	A. R. Rahman	
2000	Ravanna	"Oke Oka Asa"	S. A. Rajkumar	K. S. Chithra
2000	Ravanna	"Poola Koma"	S. A. Rajkumar	
2000	Upendra	"Doop Yamaa"	Guru Kiran	
2000	Yuvaraju	"Haayire Haai"	Ramana Gogula	K. S. Chithra
2000	Bagunnara	"Yama Yama"	Deva	
2000	Moodu Mukkalaata	"Rasi Chusthe"	M. M. Srilekha	K. S. Chithra
2000	Sardukupodaam Randi	"Kothimeeraa"	S. V. Krishna Reddy	
2000	Sardukupodaam Randi	"Vunnamataa"	S. V. Krishna Reddy	
2000	Kodanda Ramudu	"Ee Lahiri"	S. V. Krishna Reddy	K. S. Chithra
2000	Sri Srimati Sathyabhama	"Satyabhama"	S. V. Krishna Reddy	
2000	Sakutumba Saparivaara Sametam	"Pache Vennade Hi"	S. V. Krishna Reddy	
2000	Rayalaseema Ramanna Chowdary	"Chamaku Chamaku"	Mani Sharma	K. S. Chithra
2000	Vamshoddharakudu	"Dole Dole"	Koti	
2000	Kalisundam Raa	"Pacific Lo"	S. A. Rajkumar	
2001	Mrugaraju	"Aley Ley Aley"	Mani Sharma	
2001	Narasimha Naidu	"Kokkokomali"	Mani Sharma	
2001	Devi Putrudu	"Tella Thellani Cheera"	Mani Sharma	
2001	Murari	"Bangaru Kalla Bucchammo"	Mani Sharma	
2001	Eduruleni Manishi	"Are Eelakotti"	S. A. Rajkumar	
2001	Akka Bavekkada	"Muddu Meeda Mudu"	S. A. Rajkumar	
2001	Kushi	"Ammaye Sannagaa"	Mani Sharma	
2001	Prematho Raa	"Punnamila Vacchindhi"	Mani Sharma	
2001	Ammayi Kosam	"Chandini"	Vandemataram Srinivas	
2001	Ninnu Choodalani	"Muddabanthi Puvvammo"	S. A. Rajkumar	
2001	Bava Nachadu	"Chandhaa Maama"	M. M. Keeravani	K. S. Chithra, Harini
2001	Veedekkadi Mogudandi!	"Pallu Ready"	Koti	K. S. Chithra
2001	Veedekkadi Mogudandi!	"Taluku Taluk"	Koti	K. S. Chithra
2001	Bhalevadivi Basu	"Rayyi Rayyi Mandi"	Mani Sharma	
2001	Naa Manasistha Raa	"Sakkubayi Sakkubayi"	S. A. Rajkumar	
2001	Daddy	"Vaana Vaana"	S. A. Rajkumar	K. S. Chithra
2001	Daddy	"Naa Praanama"	S. A. Rajkumar	K. S. Chithra
2001	Daddy	"Mandhaara Buggalloki"	S. A. Rajkumar	
2001	Student No. 1	"Paddanandi Premalo Mari"	M. M. Keeravani	K. S. Chithra
2001	Student No. 1	"Yemetti Chesado"	M. M. Keeravani	K. S. Chithra
2001	6 Teens	"Mukkuku Mukkera"	Ghantadi krishna	
2001	Snehamante Idera	"Naa Pedaviki"(Version l)	Shiva shankar	
2001	Snehamante Idera	"Kanne Pillale"	Shiva shankar	
2001	Raa	"Ready One Two Three"	Guru kiran	
2001	Ramana	"Punnami Vennela"	Maharshi	
2001	Aakarshana	"Aakasha"(Version l)	Muralidharan	K. S. Chithra
2001	Aakarshana	"Aakasha" (Version ll)	Muralidharan	K. S. Chithra
2001	Aakarshana	"Naa Maata Naa Pasta"	Muralidharan	
2001	Adhipathi	"Puvvulanu Adugu"	Koti	K. S. Chithra
2001	Adhipathi	"Kadapalo Kannesa"	Koti	K. S. Chithra
2001	Kondaveeti Simhasanam	"Ongolu Santhalo Bhama"	Koti	
2001	Prema Sandadi	"Anukonode Analanide"	Koti	
2001	Jabili	"Ahamaina"	S. V. Krishna Reddy	
2001	Chirujallu	"Kallalo Nuvve Nuvve"	Vandemataram Srinivas	Kavita Krishnamurti
2001	Chirujallu	"Kurisindi Chirunavvula"	Vandemataram Srinivas	
2001	Bhadrachalam	"Kodu Kodu Rodulo"	Vandemataram Srinivas	
2001	Tholi Valapu	"Myne Pyar Kiya"	Vandemataram Srinivas	
2001	Simharasi	"Sathyabama"	S. A. Rajkumar	
2002	Premaku Swagatam	"Andala Yuvarani"	S. V. Krishna Reddy	
2002	Siva Rama Raju	"Swagatham Swagatham"	S. A. Rajkumar	
2002	Siva Rama Raju	"Ding Ding"	S. A. Rajkumar	
2002	Okato Number Kurraadu	"Nemali Kannoda"	M. M. Keeravani	K. S. Chithra
2002	Lahiri Lahiri Lahirilo	"Kallaloki Kallupetti"	M. M. Keeravani	K. S. Chithra
2002	Lahiri Lahiri Lahirilo	"Oh Chilakamma"	M. M. Keeravani	K. S. Chithra
2002	Tappu Chesi Pappu Koodu	"Vaana Kotindante"	M. M. Keeravani	K. S. Chithra
2002	Tappu Chesi Pappu Koodu	"Ya Alla Hare Krishna"	M. M. Keeravani	
2002	Neethone Vuntanu	"Merise Naa Kannulalona"	Vandemataram Srinivas	
2002	Koduku	"Navvu Navvu"	Vandemataram Srinivas	
2002	Girl Friend	"Nuvvu Yadikelthe"	Vandemataram Srinivas	
2002	Ammulu	"Ammulu Ammulu"	Vandemataram Srinivas	
2002	Ammulu	"Divvi Divvi Naduma"	Vandemataram Srinivas	
2002	Prudvi Narayana	"Ammo Nee Kadile"	Vandemataram Srinivas	
2002	Prudvi Narayana	"Markettu Kochindi"	Vandemataram Srinivas	
2002	Coolie	"Rendu Koppula Debbaku"	Vandemataram Srinivas	
2002	Chance	"Nee Needai"	Ghantadi Krishna	
2002	Mandharam	"Chinchadam"	Ghantadi Krishna	
2002	Nee Thodu Kavali	"Balamani"	Valisha babji	
2002	Dhanalakshmi, I Love You	"Kokkokomali"	Chakri	
2002	Kanulu Moosina Neevaye	"Love Doma Kudithe"	Chakri	
2002	Dreams	"Kannu Moose Varaku"	Chakri	
2002	Seema Simham	"Avva Buvva Kavalante"	Mani Sharma	
2002	Aadi	"Pattu Okato Saari"	Mani Sharma	
2002	Indra	"Radhe Govinda"	Mani Sharma	K. S. Chithra
2002	Chennakesava Reddy	"Bakara Bakara"	Mani Sharma	K. S. Chithra
2002	Idiot	"Leletha Navvula"	Chakri	
2002	Baba	"Maaya Maaya"	A. R. Rahman	
2002	Nuvve Nuvve	"Naa Manasu"	Koti	
2003	Naaga	"Entha Chinna Muddulona"	Vidyasagar	
2003	Ottesi Cheputunna	"Yelo Yelo Yeluroda"	Vidyasagar	
2003	Run	"Prema Pishachi"	Vidyasagar	
2003	Dongodu	"Meesala Gopala"	Vidyasagar	
2003	Villain	"Panchadara Chilaka"	Vidyasagar	
2003	Aayudham	"Why Raju"	Vandemataram Srinivas	
2003	Aayudham	"Ranga Reddy Zilla"	Vandemataram Srinivas	
2003	Missamma	"Nuvvala Jilibili Guvvala"	Vandemataram Srinivas	
2003	Lady Bachelors	"Ninnu Chudande"	Vandemataram Srinivas	
2003	Chantigadu	"Okkasari Pilichavante"	Vandemataram Srinivas	
2003	Charminar	"Ice Laa Nice Gaa"	Ghanatadi krishna	
2003	Sriramachandrulu	"Jabili Lekhapothe"	Ghanatadi krishna	
2003	Janaki Weds Sriram	"Ninnu Entha Chusina"	Ghanatadi krishna	
2003	Oka Radha Iddaru Krishnula Pelli	"Sri Ramachan"	Chakri	
2003	Oka Raju Oka Rani	"Mannutine Chinnatana"	Chakri	
2003	Veede	"Janaku Nanchal"	Chakri	
2003	Boys	"Boom Boom"	A. R. Rahman	
2003	Neetho Vastha	"Muddu"	Madhavapeddi Suresh	
2003	Neetho Vastha	"Abba Nee Najooku Letha"	Madhavapeddi Suresh	
2003	Pellamtho Panenti	"Olammo"	S. V. Krishna Reddy	
2003	Okkadu	"Cheppave Chirugaali"	Mani Sharma	
2003	Kalyana Ramudu	"Preminchu Kunnavallu"	Mani Sharma	
2003	Pellam Oorelithe	"O Malle Puvvura"	Mani Sharma	
2003	Taarak	"Mellaga Ravoyi"	Mani Sharma	
2003	Abhimanyu	"Kolo Koloyamma"	Mani Sharma	
2003	Palnati Brahmanayudu	"Oososi Poolateega"	Mani Sharma	
2003	Vasantham	"Jampandu"	S. A. Rajkumar	
2003	Chandu	"Chulbuli Bulbuli"	K veeru	
2003	Maa Alludu Very Good	"Nee Dumpathega"	M. M. Keeravani	K. S. Chithra
2003	Seetayya	"Ammathodu Ayyathodu"	M. M. Keeravani	K. S. Chithra
2003	Tagore	"Vaanoche Nante"	Mani Sharma	
2003	Ela Cheppanu	"Manninchu O Prema"	Koti	K. S. Chithra
2003	Ela Cheppanu	"Magamasa Vela"	Koti	
2003	Toli Choopulone	"Suklam"	Chakri	
2003	Toli Choopulone	"Hello Ammayi"	Chakri	
2003	Vishnu	"Are Are Mama Mama"	Ismail Darbar	
2003	Vishnu	"Okkasari Nuvvugani"	Ismail Darbar	
2003	Vishnu	"Ravoyi Chandama"	Ismail Darbar	
2003	Vishnu	"Happy Happy Birthday"	Ismail Darbar	
2004	Arjun	"Raa Raa Rajakumara"	Mani Sharma	
2004	Athade Oka Sainyam	"Nee Bulli Nikkaru"	S. V. Krishna Reddy	
2004	Mee Intikosthe Yemistharu Naa Intiiosthe Yem Thestharu	"Taha Taha Talamlo"	Ghantadi Krishna	
2004	Kushi Kushiga	"Aakasha Deshana"	S. A. Rajkumar	
2004	Valliddaru Okkare	"Nuvvu 50 Kilolu"	Vandemataram Srinivas	
2004	Valliddaru Okkare	"Oh Priya"	Vandemataram Srinivas	
2004	Oka Pellam Muddu Rendo Pellam Vaddu	"Nee Vayasu Thakkuva"	Vandemataram Srinivas	
2004	Cheppave Chirugali	"Neeli Neeli Jabilli"	S. A. Rajkumar	
2004	Suryam	"Neeli Kannula"	Chakri	
2004	Vijayendra Varma	"O Manmadha Vinnakada"	Koti	
2004	Vijayendra Varma	"Maisamma Maisamma"	Koti	K. S. Chithra
2004	Aaptudu	"Manasantha"	Ramana Gogula	
2004	Varam	"Nachinave Muddula"	M. M. Keeravani	
2004	Dost	"Malli Malli"	Koti	K. S. Chithra
2004	Dost	"Vei Vei Vatei"	Koti	
2004	Intlo Srimathi Veedhilo Kumari	"Bhama Neetho"	Ghantadi krishna	
2004	Goa	"Raave Raa Chilaka"	Krishna vasa	
2004	Memu	"Muddula Gumma"	Raghu koushik	
2004	Donga Dongadi	"Bagya Lakshmi"	Dhina	
2004	Veeri Veeri Gummadi Pandu	"Bala"	Sandeep	
2004	Kala	"Thakita Thakita"	Dharma teja	
2004	Leela Mahal Center	"Tummeda"	S. A. Rajkumar	
2004	Puttintiki Ra Chelli	"Gopala Gopala Gopilola"	S. A. Rajkumar	
2004	Ammayi Bagundi	"Krishna Krishna"	M. M. Srilekha	K. S. Chithra
2004	Mass	"Naatho Vasthava"	Devi Sri Prasad	
2004	Kaasi	"Punnami Jabili"	Sri Kommineni	
2004	Sunday	"Jeevitham Paadani"	Sri Sunil Dharma	
2005	Balu ABCDEFG	"Kannu Kottina"	Mani Sharma	
2005	Subash Chandra Bose	"Mokka Jonna Thotalo"	Mani Sharma	
2005	Kisna: The Warrior Poet	"Nedu Manam"	A. R. Rahman	
2005	Kisna: The Warrior Poet	"Oka Maata Priya"	Ismail Darbar	
2005	Sankranthi	"Ela Vachenama"	S. A. Rajkumar	
2005	Nayakudu	"Vegu Chukka"	Koti	
2005	Nuvvante Naakishtam	"Ollo Dallo Naa Bhama"	Koti	
2005	Sada Mee Sevalo	"Oh Meghamala"	Vandemataram Srinivas	
2005	Good Boy	"Namo Namo Venkatesa"	Vandemataram Srinivas	
2005	Kaadhante Avunanele	"Rim Jim Chinukuloche"	Sathyam	
2005	Ekkadikelthundho Manasu	"Ekkadiki Elthundo"	Raj deep	
2005	Naa Oopiri	"Cheliya Preme"	Deepak Dev	
2005	Naa Oopiri	"Cheliya Preme"(Remix)	Deepak Dev	
2005	Orey Pandu	"Chinuku Chinuku"	Anand Raj Anand	
2005	Allari Bullodu	"Noppi Noppi Eda Noppi"	M. M. Keeravani	
2005	Jagapati	"Nuvve Naa Pranam"	M. M. Keeravani	
2005	Narasimhudu	"Muddula Gopala"	Mani Sharma	
2005	Andarivaadu	"Ammamma Nee Mesam"	Devi Sri Prasad	
2005	Super	"Gichhi Gichhi"	Sandeep Chowta	
2005	Jai Chiranjeeva	"Ko Ko Kodi"	Mani Sharma	K. S. Chithra
2005	Maaja	"Yera Brotheru"	Vidyasagar	
2005	Muddula Koduku	Kadile Silpam	Vidyasagar	
2006	Bangaram	"Egire Chilakama"	Vidyasagar	
2006	Vesavi	"Voorlo Thotalona"	G. V. Prakash Kumar	
2006	Rajababu	"Prema O Tholi"	S. A. Rajkumar	K. S. Chithra
2006	Rajababu	"Neerajana Jaana"	S. A. Rajkumar	
2006	Kokila	"Anaganaga"	Madhukar	
2006	Bhagyalakshmi Bumper Draw	"Maaya Chesindi"	Chakri	
2006	Krrish	"Edo Edo Cheppanu"	Rajesh Roshan	
2006	Twinkle Twinkle Little Star	"Jamu Reyilo"	Ilaiayaraja	
2006	Twinkle Twinkle Little Star	"Allari Galulu"	Ilaiayaraja	
2006	Jadoo	"College Lifera"	Yuvan Shankar Raja	
2006	Jadoo	"Ketu Gada"	Yuvan Shankar Raja	
2006	Thanks	"Pooche Poolanu"	Vandemataram Srinivas	
2007	Aadavari Matalaku Ardhale Verule	"Yemaindi Ee Vela"	Yuvan Shankar Raja	
2007	Aata	"Muddulaata Muddulaata"	Devi Sri Prasad	
2007	Yamagola Malli Modalayindi	"Gundello Abbabba"	Jeevan Thomas	
2007	Athili Sattibabu LKG	"Ee Chali Galullona"	Sri krishna	
2007	Vijayadasami	"Devathaku"	Srikanth Deva	
2007	Nava Vasantham	"Punnami Vennello"	S. A. Rajkumar	
2007	Evadaithe Nakenti	"Madara Povvanti"	Chinna	
2007	Maharathi	"Yamaho Yamaho"	Gurukiran	
2007	Sivaji	"Sahana Swase"	A. R. Rahman	
2008	Krishna	"Tu Mera Jil Jil"	Chakri	
2008	Michael Madana Kamaraju	"Pamparo Panasa"	Chakri	
2008	Sammakka Sarakka Mahathyam	"Neeli Thodu"	Vandemataram Srinivas	
2008	Gorintaku	"Dum Dum Dum"	S. A. Rajkumar	
2008	Bhale Dongalu	"Manasulo Nuvvena"	K. M. Radha Krishnan	K. S. Chithra
2008	Velugu The Light (Private Album)	"Halleluiah Hosannaho"	Ashirvad	
2009	Sankham	"Maamu Maamu"	S. Thaman	
2009	Venkatadri	"Vasthulu Bagunnayi"	Srikanth Deva	
2009	Pistha	"Naa Maharani"	Mani Sharma	
2009	Blue	"Priyudu Kalisinadaiya Nannu Kalisinadaiya"	A. R. Rahman	Madhushree, Raven Millhouse, Shi Millhouse
2009	Drona	"Vennela Vaana"	Anup Rubens	
2009	A Aa E Ee	"Pooppodi Kanna"	M. M. Srilekha	
2010	Simha	"Achahai"	Chakri	
2011	Wanted	"Dil Mera Dhak Dhak"	Chakri	
2011	1947 A Love Story	"Ramma Dorasani"	G. V. Prakash Kumar	
2011	Rowdram	"Merise Nee Kanulu"	Prakash Nikki	
2012	Poola Rangadu	"Chocolate"	Anoop Rubens	
2012	Devudu Chesina Manushulu	"Yemi Sethura"	Raghu Kunche	
2012	Srimannarayana	"Thakathai"	Chakri	
2012	Malli Kalustha	"Ammo Subbammo"	Brinda hk	
2012	Yamaho Yama	"Kavalante Istha"	Mahathi	
2013	Mr. Pellikoduku	"Nuvvu Naatho"	S. A. Rajkumar	
2013	Mr. Pellikoduku	"Osi Nee Oni Vodi Ovdi Ga"	S. A. Rajkumar	
2013	Anandha Sai (Private Album)	"Ananda Sai Govinda Sai"	Various	
2014	Pandavulu Pandavulu Tummeda	"Choosa Nene"	Achu Rajamani	
2017	Gautamiputra Satakarni	"Ekimeedaa"	Chirantan Bhatt	
2017	Lover Boy	"Okati Avvadame"	Ashirvad	
2018	Oollo Pelliki Kukkala Hadavidi	"Poola Pandiri"	Anup Rubens	
2022	Anu	"Emaindhi Emo"	Ghantasala Vishwanath	
2025	Mana Shankara Vara Prasad Garu	"Meesala Pilla"	Bheems Ceciroleo	

== Marathi film songs ==
Year	Film	Song	Composer(s)	Co-artist(s)
1992	Sagle Saarkhech	"Aaj Maza Nasheeb Mhana"	Ram Lakshman	Alka Yagnik
1992	Sagle Saarkhech	"Tehtis Koti Devanno Dhavat Ya"	Ram Lakshman	
2015	Than Than Gopal	"Reshim Bandhanache"	Simaab Sen	
2017	Shoor Aamhi Sardaar	"Jadugari"	Vaishnav Deva	Dalia Mitra
2017	Shoor Aamhi Sardaar	"Pahile Jeva Tula"	Vaishnav Deva	

== Bhojpuri film songs ==
Year	Film	Song	Composer(s)	Lyrics	Co-artist(s)
1983	Hamar Bhauji	Bada Dagabaj	Chitragupt	Anjaan	Alka Yagnik
1983	Hamar Bhauji	Bhaiya Hamre Ram Jaisan	Chitragupt	Anjaan	Suresh Wadkar, Shailendra Singh
1983	Chukti Bhar Senur	Chirai To Chirai Baheliya"	Chitragupt	Majrooh Sultanpuri	Usha Mangeshkar
1984	Bhaiya Dooj	"Yaad Rakhiha Hamri Piritiya"	Chitragupt		Alka Yagnik
1989	Kaisan Banaul Sansar	Lagi Gayile Mohar Sarkaari	Vijay–Ajit	Dr. Gurdeep	Shobha Joshi
1989	Kaisan Banaul Sansar	Sabere Bahe Pachhua	Vijay–Ajit	Dr. Gurdeep	Shobha Joshi
1989	Kaisan Banaul Sansar	Ram Ji Gopal Ji	Vijay–Ajit	Dr. Gurdeep	Mukesh Shivram
2002	Anari Balma	"Gauhaan Humar Saancho"	Shri Arvind Krishnan		Chandrani Mukuerjee
2002	Anari Balma	"Chunari Re Chunari"	Shri Arvind Krishnan		Muralidhar Gode
2003	Bandhan Toote Naa	"Kahela Bagwala"	Dhananjay Mishra		Shreya Ghoshal
2003	Beti Bhaeel Pardesi	"Lagta Ki Pyaar Ho Gaeel"	Sunil Chhaila Bihari, Ashok Ghayal		Sadhana Sargam
2003	Chhaila Babu	"Humke Tohra Pe Ba"	Shekhar Sharma		Shreya Ghoshal
2003	Chhaila Babu	"Rahi Rahi Maske Dono"	Shekhar Sharma		Shreya Ghoshal
2003	Chhaila Babu	"Jiyal Bada Duswar"	Shekhar Sharma		Alka Yagnik
2004	Balma Bada Nadan	"Hamhoon Ho Gayili Advance"	Dhananjay Mishra		
2004	Balma Bada Nadan	"Uthela Karejwa Mein Lahiya"	Dhananjay Mishra		
2005	Mai Re Kar De Bidai Humar	"Jaise Chanda"	Rajesh Prasad	Madhusri	
2005	Dulha Milal Dildar	"Dulha Milal Dildar"		Kalpana Patowary	
2005	Dulha Milal Dildar	"Chal Chal Kahi Pyar Kare"		Kalpana Patowary	
2005	Dulha Milal Dildar	"Ab Ta Ehe Armaan"		Kalpana Patowary	
2006	Ab Ta Banja Sajanwa Hamaar	"Sun Goriya O Sun Goriya"	Bhushan Dua		
2006	Ab Ta Banja Sajanwa Hamaar	"Chori Chori Ankhiyan Milake"	Bhushan Dua	Shreya Ghoshal	
2006	Ab Ta Banja Sajanwa Hamaar	"Tukur Tukur"	Bhushan Dua	Deepa Narayan	
2006	Bhai Hokhe Ta Aisan	"Tohra Pyar Mein Pagal"	Rajesh Gupta	Kalpana	
2006	Bhai Hokhe Ta Aisan	"Ankhiya Mein Baslaba"	Rajesh Gupta	Kalpana	
2006	Chacha Bhatija	"Laika Pe Laiki Deewana"	Dhanajay Mishra	Anuradha Paudwal	
2006	Chacha Bhatija	"Chacha Bhatija"	Dhanajay Mishra		
2006	Chacha Bhatija	"Jeans Paint Wali"	Dhanajay Mishra		
2006	Chalat Musafir Moh Liyo Re	"Aaja Ae Raja Theitar Mein"	Rajesh Gupta		
2006	Chalat Musafir Moh Liyo Re	"Jaat Batade Ishwar Ke"	Rajesh Gupta		
2006	Rangli Chunariya Tohre Naam	"Lagaal Aake Karejawa Me		Pamela Jain	
2006	Rangli Chunariya Tohre Naam	"Purvaiya Bahe"		Solo	
2007	Baklol Dulha	"Aaj Akhiyon Se"	Gunwant Sen, Raaj Sen	Kalpana	
2007	Baklol Dulha	"Pyaar Ke Pankha"	Gunwant Sen, Raaj Sen	Pamela Jaina	
2007	Baklol Dulha	"Rup Anmol Pawalu"	Gunwant Sen, Raaj Sen	Deepa Narayan	
2007	Khagadiya Wali Bhauji	"Khagadiya Wali Bhauji"	Chandra Bhushan Pradhan	Priya Bhattacharya	
2007	Maati	"Pahile Bahaal Basant Bayaar"	Rajesh Gupta	Priya Bhattacharya	
2007	Gangotri (2007 film)	"Tu Zingi Ke Saans"			
2007	Gangotri (2007 film)	"Bandhal Rahi Dor"			
2008	B A Pass Bahuriya	"Bhaag Chala Gharva"	Rajesh Gupta	Poornima	
2008	B A Pass Bahuriya	"Resam Ke Choliya"	Rajesh Gupta	Indhu Sonali	
2008	Betwa Bahubali	"Swarg Se Suhag"	Shyam Dehati, Vinay Bihari		
2008	Betwa Bahubali	"Likhal Baa"	Shyam Dehati, Vinay Bihari		
2008	Betwa Bahubali	"Pyar Tohase Kareele"	Shyam Dehati, Vinay Bihari	Anuradha Paudwal	
2008	Betwa Bahubali	"Bate Lahanga Piyar"	Shyam Dehati, Vinay Bihari		
2008	Bhole Shankar	"Kehu Sapna Mein"	Dhananjay Mishra	Kalpana	
2008	Chalni Ke Chaalal Dulha	"Ruk Ja Ae Chanda"	Shashi Kanth Sharma	Rekha Rao	
2008	Pratigya	"Man Ke Sanwariya Ban Gayila Tu"	Rajesh Rajnish	Kalpana	
2009	Biyaah - The Full Entertainment	"Bola Ae Purwai Ti"	Ashok Shivpuri	Pamela Jain	
2010	Chandu Ki Chameli	"Piya Ke Milan Ki Aas"	Dhananjay Mishra	Priya Majumdar	
2010	Chandu Ki Chameli	"Mehbuba Mehbuba"	Dhananjay Mishra	Madhushree	
2010	Daag	"Ankhiyan Milala Garva"	Vinay Bihari	Indu Sonali	
2010	Satyamev Jataye	"Dhadkawelu Dil"			
2011	Sajan Chale Sasural	"Aaj Dharti Pe Aise"		Khushboo Jain	
2012	Jaan Tere Naam	"Suna Sanam Khus Bani Hum"		Khushboo Jain	Pyarelal Yadav
2014	Jung	"Pagal Kar Dihala"	Lal Singh		Sadhana Sargam
2015	Na Pyaar Tute Kahete	"Badi Namkin Goriya Re"	Prashant		

== Maithili songs ==
Year	Movie	Song title	Music director	Lyrics	Co-singers
2014	Half Murder	"Kiye Hansi"	Sunil Pawan		Kavita Krishnamurthy

== Nepali songs ==
=== Selected Nepali discography ===
Film	Song name
-	"Aaja Hamro"
-	"Banmara Le"
-	"Dui Din Ko"
-	"Hera batas le"
-	"Him Nadi Jhai"
-	"Majhi dai le"
-	"Oru kaaryam"
-	"Zindagi ko goreto maa"
-	"Kahile timro pachheuri"
-	"Kalo Chasma"
-	"Kandha rakhi"
-	"Ko bhanchha zindagi"
-	"Ma sapana ko"
-	"Makhamali Pachheuri"
-	"Maya nai maya chh"
-	"Timi nabhaye"
-	"Timro Pachheuri"
-	"Yo Gaau Ko Kanchho Ma"
-	"Saajh Yo subha"
-	"Larke Joban"
-	"Purnima"

Year	Film/Album	Song name(s)	Music director(s)	Lyrics	Co-singer(s)
1985	Kusume Rumal	Kusume Rumal	Ranjit Gajmer		Deepa Jha
1985	Kusume Rumal	Suna Bhanana	Ranjit Gajmer		Deepa Jha
1985	Kusume Rumal	Timi Nabhayae	Ranjit Gajmer		
1988	Saino	Naya Naya Sajhau Hai Sansar	Ranjit Gazmer		Asha Bhosle
1988	Saino	Aama Le Bhanthin Dharako Pani	Ranjit Gazmer		Danny Denzongpa
1994	Swarga	"Chhori Malai Bhagi Bhagi"	Shambhujeet Baskota		
1994	Swarga	"Bandliyo Kina Mero"	Shambhujeet Baskota		
2000	Jindagani	"Timro Tyo Aankhama"	Shambhujeet Baskota		Deepa Narayan Jha
2000	Jindagani	"Maya Nai Maya Chha"	Shambhujeet Baskota		solo
2001	Yo Maya Ko Sagar	"Timro Mayale"	Shambhujeet Baskota	Deepa Narayan Jha	
2001	Yo Maya Ko Sagar	"Hera Batasle Suseldai"	Shambhujeet Baskota	Deepa Narayan Jha	
2001	Yo Maya Ko Sagar	"Yo Maya Ko Sagar"	Shambhujeet Baskota		Sadhana Sargam
2005	Muglan	"Dashain Aayo"	Deepa Jha, Narayan Lama, Juna Parsai	Suresh Adhikari	
2009	Sarangi	"Lajaaunu Pardaina"	Deepa Narayan Jha	Shambhujeet Baskota	
2009	Sarangi	"Aama Paji Geet"	Deepa Narayan Jha	Shambhujeet Baskota	
2009	Sarangi	"Sharangi Ko Dhunle"	Sadhana Sargam	Shambhujeet Baskota	
2010	Parkhirakha Hai	"Timilai Dekhne Manchhe" (part 1)	Suresh Adhikari, Prem Dhoj Pradhan		solo
2010	Parkhirakha Hai	"Parkhirakha Hai"	Suresh Adhikari, Prem Dhoj Pradhan		Manjira
-	Behuli	Maya ke Hola			
-	Adhunik	Kahile Kahi Manka Kura		Gopal Yonjan	
-	Lobhi Paapi	Hoye Hoye Goria		Sambhujeet Baskota	
-	Mohani	Yo Gaun Ko Thitto Ma, Sarankotaima Mohani Rahecha Timro Oothai Ma, Yo Saanjh Yo Suvaas	Deepa Narayan Jha, Kumar Sanu	Sambhujeet Baskota	
-	Bhannai Sakina	Pura Bhayo Sapana Mero	Deepa Narayan Jha	Sambhujeet Baskota	
-	Adhikar	Mohani Lagyo K			

== Bengali songs ==
=== film songs ===
Year	Film	Song	Composer(s)	Co-artist(s)	
1989	Mone Mone	"Bosle Eshe"	Kanu Bhattacharya		
1990	Aashiqui (dubbed)	"Duti Mon Mile Onek Bosonto Hoy"	Nadeem-Shravan	Anuradha Paudwal	
1990	Agnidaha	"Premer Phagun"	Bappi Lahiri	Poornima	
1990	Agnidaha	"Sujon Tumi Chara"	Bappi Lahiri	Kavita Krishnamurthy	
1991	Rid Shodh	"Ekbar Boluk Se"	Rajesh Roshan	Sadhana Sargam	
1992	Amriter Putra	"Auto Rickshaw"		Sonu Nigam	
1992	Amriter Putra	"Aaj Tomake Peyechi"		Anuradha Paudwal	
1992	Bondhu Amar	"Hawai Jahaje"	Bappi Lahiri	solo	
1992	Mon Mane Na	"Chhoddobeshi Nayok Ami"	Babul Bose	solo	
1992	Mon Mane Na	"Khukumoni O Ma Jononi"	Babul Bose	Deepa Narayan, Vinod Pandit	
1992	Pratyabartan	"Oi Pahare Oi Pathore"	Bappi Lahiri	Alka Yagnik	
1992	Rakta Lekha	"Amar Naam Habiba	Bappi Lahiri	Swapna Mukherjee	
1993	Dalaal (dubbed)	"Sundori Are Jole Gelo"	Bappi Lahiri	Alka Yagnik	
1993	Ghar Sansar	"Srabon Ke Bhalobeshe" (female)	Prashanta Nanda	solo	
1993	Tomar Rakte Amar Sohag	"Dol Dol Daluni"	Bappi Lahiri	Kavita Krishnamurti	
1994	Dilwale (Dubbed version)	"Sujog Pai Jodi"	Nadeem–Shravan	Alka Yagnik	
1994	Nilanjana	"Aar Janamer Sei Bondhu"	Bappi Lahiri	Abhijeet Bhattacharya	
1994	Prem Sanghat	"Prem Korte Icche Hoy"	N/A	Usha Uthup	
1994	Protyaghat	"Ei Chokh Ja Dekhe"	Bappi Lahiri	Sadhana Sargam	
1994	Protyaghat	"Shopoth Nilam Aaj"	Bappi Lahiri	chorus	
1994	Sagar	"Bondhu Amar"	Mrinal Benerjee	Kavita Krishnamurthy	
1994	Tobu Mone Rekho	"Tuki Tuki Tuki"	Rocket Mondal	Asha Bhosle	
1994	Tumi Je Aamar	"Eso Buke Eso"	Babul Bose	solo	
1994	Tumi Je Aamar	"Koya Karva Loya Karulu"	Babul Bose	Kavita Krishnamurthy	
1995	Mohini	"Eka Jeo Na"	Babul Bose		
1995	Priyo Tumi	"Jite Gechi"	Alauddin Ali	Anuradha Paudwal, Kavita Krishnamurthy	
1995	Priyo Tumi	"Ki Jolo Ki Holo"	Alauddin Ali	Uma Khan	
1995	Raja (dubbed)	"Kono Din Hobo Ami"	Nadeem-Shravan	Alka Yagnik	
1995	Raja (dubbed)	"Chokhe Chochk Rekhe Tobu"	Nadeem-Shravan	Alka Yagnik	
1995	Sansar Sangram	"Kader Gharer"	Anupam Dutta	Kavita Krishnamurthy	
1995	Sansar Sangram	"Sorry Sir Nomoshkar"	Anupam Dutta	Kavita Krishnamurthy	
1995	Sansar Sangram	"Sansar Sangram"	Anupam Dutta	solo	
1995	Sesh Pratiksha	"Tumi Sundori Koto"	Anupam Dutta	Sadhana Sargam	
1996	Attotyag	"Amar Paye Bidheche"	Alauddin Ali	Poornima	
1996	Bachar Lorai	"Tumi Dakle Pore"	Alauddin Ali	Kavita Krishnamurthy	
1996	Bachar Lorai	"Ei Ruper Haate"	Alauddin Ali	Poornima	
1996	Bazigor	"Porechho Gyarakole"	Alauddin Ali	Uma Khan	
1996	Mukhyamantri	"Tor Bap Chilo"	Mrinal Bindopadhyay		
1996	Nikhoj	"Roj Roj Dekhe Tomay"		Sadhana Sargam	
1997	Bhagyodebota	"Bhagyodebota"	Madhu Burman, Gopal Burman	Pulak Banerjee	solo
1997	Bhagyodebota	"E Raat Jeno Kichhu Bolte Chay"	Madhu Burman, Gopal Burman	Pulak Banerjee	Hemlata
1997	Dabidar	"Chhotto Amar"	Indrajit		
1997	Dabidar	"Tuhi Meri Subah"	Indrajit		
1997	Manasa Kanya	"Fish Kore Ja"	Ashok Roy		
1997	Manasa Kanya	"Saper Montro"	Ashok Roy		
1998	Aami Sei Meye	"E Mon Lage Aaj Khushi"	Tabun Sutradhar	Alka Yagnik	
1998	Raja Rani Badshah	"Mago Amar Ma"	Babul Bose	Kavita Krishnamurthy	
1998	Raja Rani Badshah	"Dhaka Theke"	Babul Bose	Kavita Krishnamurthy	
1998	Raja Rani Badshah	"Ektu Dekho"	Babul Bose	Sadhana Sargam	
1998	Debanjali	"Phire Rlo Dol"	Babul Bose	Anuradha Paudwal	
1998	Debanjali	"O Megh Megh Re"	Babul Bose	Anuradha Paudwal	
1998	Debanjali	"Joy Maa Jogottarini" (part 1)	Babul Bose	solo	
1998	Debanjali	"Joy Maa Jogottarini" (part 2)	Babul Bose	solo	
1998	Lola Lucy	"Mammi Bole"		Kavita Krishnamurthy	
1998	Lola Lucy	"Yamma Ho"		Kavita Krishnamurthy	
1998	Shopner Raja	"N/A"	Bappi Lahiri	N/A	Alka Yagnik
1998	Tomar Amar Prem	"Manush Pothik Beshe"	Azad Mintu		
1998	Tomar Amar Prem	"Kokhono Ki"	Azad Mintu		
"Ogo Sathi Amar"	Tomar Amar Prem	Sultana Chowdhury	Azad Mintu		
1999	Rajdondo	"Golap Golap Kotha"		Usha Uthup	
1999	Rajdondo	"Chokhe Chokhe Chokh"		Alka Yagnik	
1999	Sindhoor Khela	"Golap Golape"	Uttam Singh	Preeti Singh	
1999	Sindhoor Khela	"Kon Guna Jar Acha"	Uttam Singh	Alka Yagnik	
2000	Aasroy	"Akhane Aashini'	Babul Bose	Priya Bhattacharya	
2000	Dhadkan (Dubbed)	"E Ki Holo Bolo Mone" (version 1)	Nadeem-Shravan	Kumar Sanu, Alka Yagnik	
2000	Dhadkan (Dubbed)	"Naa Naa Koreo Keno Je"	Nadeem-Shravan	Alka Yagnik	
2000	Prem Preeti Bhalobasha	"Bujhlam Bhalobasha"		solo	
2000	Sasurbari Zindabad	"Ja Chado Na"	Babul Bose	Sadhana Sargam	
2000	Sasurbari Zindabad	"Sona Sona"	Babul Bose		
2000	Shotti Aai To Jibon	"Katha Dilam"	Amar Haldipur	Anuradha Pawdwal	
2000	Shotti Aai To Jibon	"Tumi Amar Ke"	Amar Haldipur	Jayshree Shivram	
2001	Aaghat	"Ki Hoechhe"	Babul Bose	Binda, Priya Bhattacharya	
2001	Aaghat	"Tumi Aamar Ke"	Babul Bose	Deepa, Adhithya	
2001	Amader Sansar	"Tomari Poroshe" (male)		solo	
2001	Amader Sansar	"Ami Chilam Eka Eka"		Sanjeevani	
2001	Bangshadhar	"Kichu Kichu Kotha"	N/A	Jolly Mukherjee	
2001	Dada Thakur	"Love Love Mane"	Babul Bose	Kavita Krishnamurti	
2001	Guru Shisya	"Aara Ru Ara Ru"	Babul Bose	Sadhana Sargam	
2001	Guru Shisya	"Haay Haay Khal Kete"	Babul Bose	Sadhana Sargam	
2001	Jamaibabu Zindabad	"Sei To Tomar Kache Elam Phire"	Babul Bose	Anuradha Paudwal	
2001	Parinati	"Bohudesh Ghure"	Mrinal Banerjee		
2002	Annadata	"Amader Kotha Shudhu Mone Rekho"	Babul Bose	Babul Supriyo, Deepa Narayan	
2002	Annadata	"Din Ase Din Jay"	Babul Bose	Kumar Sanu	
2002	Ektu Chhoa	"O Badoloker Beti"	Kanu Bhattacharjee	solo	
2002	Inquilaab	"Vande Mataram"	Subhaya		
2002	Jibon Judh	"Kalo Kalo Duti"	Babul Bose	Sadhana Sargam	
2002	Phool Aur Pathar	"E Moner Akashe" (version 1)	Bappi Lahiri	Anuradha Paudwal	
2002	Phool Aur Pathar	"E Moner Akashe" (version 2)	Bappi Lahiri	Anuradha Paudwal	
2002	Prem Shakti	"Bansi Te"	Tabun	Sadhana Sargam	
2002	Prem Shakti	"Jato Din"	Tabun	Sadhana Sargam	
2002	Shiva	"Chok Theke"	Babul Bose		
2002	Shoshurbari Zindabad	"Ami Chilam Eka Eka"	Emon Saha	Sanjeevani	
2003	Andha Prem	"Eai Pahar Jane"	Babul Bose	Sadhana Sargam	
2003	Amar Mayer Shapath	"Tomai Bhalo"	Anu Malik	Poornima	
2003	Moner Majhe Tumi	"Premi O Premi"	Devendranath Chatterje	Sadhana Sargam	
2003	Moner Majhe Tumi	"Premi O Premi"(Sad)	Devendranath Chatterje	Sadhana Sargam	
2004	Agun Jolbei	"Kalo Kalo Duti Chokhete"	Babul Bose	Sadhana Sargam	
2004	Akritoggo	"Ek Poloke Sei Ektu Dekhay"		Shampa Kundu, Kavita Krishnamurthy	
2004	Badsha the King	"Sathi Eto Bhalobasa"	Ashok Bhadra		
2004	Barood	"Premer Ei Rasta"	Babul Bose	Shreya Ghoshal	
2004	Barood	"Mon Niye"	Babul Bose	Sadhana Sargam	
2004	Dadu No. 1	"Aei Bhaire"	Malay Ganguly	Babul Supriyo	
2004	Dadu No. 1	"Aj Aei Shubhodine"	Malay Ganguly	Shreya Ghoshal, Babul Supriyo	
2004	Devdoot	"Jato Swapno"	Babu Bose	Shreya Ghoshal	
2004	Devdoot	"Tomake Tomar"	Babu Bose	Shreya Ghoshal	
2004	Gyarakal	"Aaj Nay Onno"	Babul Bose		
2004	Kuyasha	"Ei Aakash"(Duet)	Soumitra Kundu	Sunidhi Chauhan	
2004	Kuyasha	"Ei Aakash"(Bit)	Soumitra Kundu		
2004	Parinam	"Je Deshe Ramdhanu"	Babul Bose	Alka Yagnik	
2004	Parinam	"Laal Neel Sobuje"	Babul Bose	Alka Yagnik	
2004	Prem Korechi Besh Korechi	"Ninda Kore Koruk Loke"	Alauddin Ali	Anuradha Paudwal	
2004	Protishodh	"Brindabone Cholo Sokhi"	Ashok Bhadra	solo	
2004	Raja Babu	"Choto Sona Tor Kache"	Ashok Bhadra	Kumar Sanu	
2004	Ram Laxman	"TiK TiK Gharir"	Babul Bose	Shreya Ghoshal	
2004	Ram Laxman	"Kau Ke Lagena"	Babul Bose	Shreya Ghoshal	
2004	Sajani	"Bhalo Lage Sudhu"	Ashok Bhadra	Deepmala	
2004	Sagar Kinare	"Mone Mone"	Rupam Sharma	Anupama Deshpande	
2004	Shudhu Tumi	"Sajbe Ebar Koner"	Zubeen Garg	Pamela Jain	
2004	Surya	"Choriye Gelo"	Babul Bose	Sneha Panth	
2004	Swami Chintai	"E Monar Bhalobasa"	Babul Bose	Sadhana Sargam	
2004	Swapne Dekha Rajkanya	"Sapne Dekhechi Jare"	Babul Bose	Shreya Ghoshal	
2004	Tyaag	N/A	Ashok Bhadra	N/A	
2005	Bazi	"Jodi Ami Tomake"	Ashok Bhadra	Shreya Ghoshal	
2005	Chita	"Chokhe Chokhe"	Babul Bose	Sadhana Sargam	
2005	Chita	"Moner Katha"	Babul Bose	Shreya Ghoshal	
2005	Criminal	"Eto Bhalo Keu Ajo"	Anupam Dutta	Shreya Ghoshal	
2005	Mayer Raja	"O Amar Vanga Khate"	Sunil Majumder	Poornima	
2005	Parinam	"Je deshe Ramdhanu Eke"	Babul Bose	Alka Yagnik	
2005	Parinam	"Lal Nil Sobuje"	Babul Bose	Alka Yagnik	
2005	Rajmohol	"Ekhane Shudhu"	Ashok Bhadra	Shreya Ghoshal	
2005	Shakal Sandhya	"Aakashe Sur Jo O Te"	Ashok Bhadra	Sadhana Sargam	
2005	Shakal Sandhya	"Mon Metheche"	Ashok Bhadra		
2005	Sangram	"Ajker Dinta Onno"	Ashok Bhadra		
2005	Sudhu Bhalobasa	"Nachbo Tomar"	Shubayh	Anupama Deshpande	
2005	Swapno	"Chanchal Mon"	Hemant Mukherjee, Madhu Mukherjee	Sadhana Sargam	
2005	Tabu Bhalobashi	"Khola Khola"	Snehashis Chakraborty	Shreya Ghoshal	
2005	Tomake Selam	"Ami Tomar Sonamoni" (part 1)	Bappi Lahiri, Ravindra, Bali Brahmabhatt	Sadhana Sargam	
2005	Tomake Selam	"Ami Tomar Sonamoni" (part 2)	Bappi Lahiri, Ravindra, Bali Brahmabhatt	Sadhana Sargam	
2005	Tomake Selam	"Ajker Prithibite"	Bappi Lahiri, Ravindra, Bali Brahmabhatt	solo	
2005	Tomake Selam	"Tomake Selam"	Bappi Lahiri, Ravindra, Bali Brahmabhatt	solo	
2005	Tomake Selam	"Ekbar O Priya"	Bappi Lahiri, Ravindra, Bali Brahmabhatt	solo	
2006	Mayer Morjada	"Aneke Bachte Chay"	Emon Saha	Sadhana Sargam	
2006	Sathihara	"Moner Kotha Jodi"	Babul Bose	Shreya Ghoshal	
2006	Shikar	"Ki Katha Lekha"	Ashok Bhadra	Sadhana Sargam	
2007	Kaka No 1	"Tomari Chorone"	Presenjit Chakraborty		
2007	Prem	"Chokhe Legeche"	Ashok Bhadra		
2007	Prem	"Chokhe Legeche"(Dream)	Ashok Bhadra		
2007	Prem	"Chokhe Legeche"(Sad)	Ashok Bhadra		
2007	Shap Mochan	"Charona Dhekle"	Babul Bose		
2008	Golmaal	"Chokhe Chokhe"	Ashok Bhadra		
2008	Janmadata	"Ektu Jodi Aro"	Ashok Bhadra	Alka Yagnik	
2008	Mahakaal	"Ektu Dekha"	Devjith		
2008	Mr. Funtoosh	"Jegeche Prana"	Subhayu	Jaspinder Narula	
2008	Takkar	"Moyna Re Moyna Tui"	Ashok Bhadra	Sadhana Sargam	
2009	Chaowa Pawa	"Sudhu Cheye"(Duet)	Ashok Bhadra	Deepmala	
2009	Chaowa Pawa	"Sudhu Cheye"(Male)	Ashok Bhadra		
2009	Rajdrohi	"Kachhe Ese Hariye Jawa"	Babul Bose		Alka Yagnik
2010	Besh Korechi Prem Korechi	"Besh Korechi Prem Korechi"	Kumar Sanu	Alka Yagnik	
2010	Love Circus	"O Akash Daona Bole"	Ashok Bhadra	solo	
2012	Mayuri	"Tomar Chokher Jol"	N/A	Arati Mukherjee	

=== Non-film songs ===
Year	Film	Song	Composer(s)	Co-artist(s)
1997	Ogo Ruposhi	"Surate Hoini Matal"	Bhushan Kumar	solo
1997	Ogo Ruposhi	"Ogo Ruposhi"	Bhushan Kumar	solo
1998	Sagor Bonna	"Tumi Je Amay Jagale"	Ajoy Das	Anuradha Paudwal
2008	Hridoyer Chhowa	"Bhul Kore Keu Mon Diyona"	Arup-Pranay	solo
2008	Hridoyer Chhowa	"Tumi Ele Bhorer Belay"	Arup-Pranay	solo
2008	Hridoyer Chhowa	"Koto Jadu Tumi Jano"	Arup-Pranay	solo
2008	Hridoyer Chhowa	"Ami Jete Parbona"	Arup-Pranay	solo
2008	Hridoyer Chhowa	"Ki Achhe Amay Bolo"	Arup-Pranay	solo
2012	Gulmohor	"Oi Dure Jei Sondha Naame"	Nadeem-Shravan	Alka Yagnik
2012	Gulmohor	"Gulmohore Sajano"	Nadeem-Shravan	Alka Yagnik
2012	Gulmohor	"Tomay Bhalobeshechi"	Nadeem-Shravan	Alka Yagnik
2012	Gulmohor	"Prothom Bedona"	Nadeem-Shravan	solo
N/A	Chokhe Legechhe Nesha	"Oi Pahare"	Bappi Lahiri	Alka Yagnik

== Malayalam film songs ==
Year	Film	Song	Composer(s)	Co-singer(s)
2003	CID Moosa	"Chilamboli Kaate"	Vidyasagar	Sujatha Mohan
2005	Kochi Rajavu	"Munthiri Padam"	Vidyasagar	Sujatha Mohan
2006	Lion	"Sundari Onnu Parayu"	Deepak Dev	Shwetha Mohan
2006	Lion	"Sundari Onnu Parayu"(Remix)	Deepak Dev	Shwetha Mohan
2007	Speed Track	"Oru Kinnaara"	Deepak Dev	Sujatha Mohan
2010	Four Friends	"Yeh Dosti"	M. Jayachandran	Shankar Mahadevan
2010	Pappy Appacha	"Thammil Thammil"	Vidyasagar	Sujatha Mohan
2012	Spanish Masala	"Irulil Oru"	Vidyasagar	Vidyasagar
2012	Sound Thoma	"Oru Kaaryam"	Gopi Sundar	Shreya Ghoshal
2013	Nadodimannan	"Macha Enna Marannidalle"	Vidyasagar	Rimi Tomy, Jyotsna Radhakrishnan

== Odia film songs ==
Year	Film	Song name	Composer	Co-Artist
1994	Gopare Badhuchi Kala Kanhei	"Tame Asuthila"	Bachu Mukherjee	Geeta
1997	Kandheyi Aakhire Luha	"Jhumuka Thila Bajuna"	Amarendra Mohanty	Sadhana Sargam
2005	Premi No.1	"Tu Nahin Kichi Mate"		Ira Mohanty
2008	Love Fever	"Mo Mana Ku Pachari"		Ira Mohanty
2010	Tora Mora Jodi Sundara	"Tora Mora Jodi Sundara "		Ira Mohanty
2010	Asibu Kebe Saji Mo Rani	"Rupeli Dehari Tora"	Gagan Bihari	Ira Mohanty
2012	Kebe Tume Nahan Kebe Mu Nahin	"Sata Rutu Gala Mate Chhuin"	Bikash Das	Mahalaxmi Iyer
2012	Kebe Tume Nahan Kebe Mu Nahin	"Re Mita Mo Gita"	Bikash Das	Mahalaxmi Iyer
2012	Kebe Tume Nahan Kebe Mu Nahin	"O My Love"	Bikash Das	Pamela Jain
2012	Thookol	"Sathire To Bina"		Ira Mohanty
2013	Mo Duniya Tu Hi Tu	"Kanhei Re Kanhei"	Malay Mishra	Solo
2013	Paribeni Kehi Alaga Kari	"Pagala Tu Thilu Mo Pain"	Prem Anand	
2013	Ashiq Mu Awara	"Juade Chahunchi Mu"	Bikash Shukla	Ira Mohanty
2013	My Love Story	"My Love Story"	Gagan Bihari	Tarannum Malik
2013	Deewana Deewani	"Deewana Mun Deewani Tu"	Prasant Padhi	Pamela Jain
2013	Target	"Tume Mo Nayanara Nayana Tara"	Rabi Narayan Nanda, Abhijit Majumdar	solo
2013	Superstar	"Chori Chori Dheere Dheere"	Mihir Mohanty	Ira Mohanty
2013	Salam Cinema	"A Mahua"	Abhijit Majumdar	solo
2013	Sapanara Nayika	"Tu Mo Sapanara Nayika"	Prasant Padhi	Papu Mishra
2013	Hata Dhari Chalutha	"Sabu Janamare"	Prem Anand	solo, Ira Mohanty
2013	Hata Dhari Chalutha	"Sathire Sathi Sathi"	Prem Anand	solo, Ira Mohanty
2013	Hata Dhari Chalutha	"Batoi Mu Eka Eka"	Prem Anand	solo, Ira Mohanty
2013	Hata Dhari Chalutha	"Mo Luhara Ranga Aaji"	Prem Anand	solo, Ira Mohanty
2013	Hata Dhari Chalutha	"Prema Ra Baji"	Prem Anand	solo, Ira Mohanty
2013	Hata Dhari Chalutha	"Aaji Kahin Sabu Rutu	Prem Anand	solo, Ira Mohanty
2013	Hata Dhari Chalutha	" E Jibana"	Prem Anand	solo, Ira Mohanty
2013	Mun Eka Tumara	"Tama Bina Kaha Ku "	Bikash Das	Namita Agrawal
2014	Something Something 2	"Prema Hei Jae Re"		Human Sagar
2014	Pagala Karichu Tu	"Mote Pagala Karichu Tu"	Bikash Das	Namita Agrawal
2014	Pagala Karichu Tu	"Pagalu Karachi Tu"	Bikash Das	Namita Agrawal

=== Odia album songs ===
Album	Song
	"Janha Re Tate Punei Raana"
Phula Kandhei	"Megha Re Megha Katha Dei Tu"
	"Prathama Prema Ra Prathama Chithi"
Bana Harinee	"Phulara Sahare Gharate Tolichhi Tu Aasibu"
To Chehera	"Priya Mora Deithili Tora Nan Rajanigandha"
Golapa Kadhi	"Tame Jadi Mate Bhala Pauchha"
Golapa Kadhi	"Bhuligalu Bhulijaai Bhala Kalu"
Golapa Kadhi	"Kouthi Achhu Tu Kemiti Achhu"
Golapa Kadhi	"Tu Raati Aakasa Ra Taara Lo"
	"Hrudaya Ku Mora Chuna Chuna Kari"
	"Bhala Laaguchi Jedina Ru"
	"Excuse Me"
	"Aakasa Re Janha Tie Thau"
	"Sraabana Pherichi Aaji"
	"Mo Priya Emiti Odia Jhia"
	"Pari Tie Kehi Baatabana Hoi"
Anjali	"To Bina Mu Naahi"
Anjali	"Dina Baarata Bele Janha"
Anjali	"Rajakumari Aalo Rajakumari"
Anjali	"Dina Baarata Bele Janha"
	"Anjali Lo Tate Abhinanadana"
	"Chithi Mora Aasilani"
	"Megha Re Megha Kahijaa"
	"Rutu Raija Ra Rani Sie"
	"Ae Rupa Ae Chehera Tu"
	"Se Mo Dreamgirl"
	"Indra Dhanu Ra Saata Ranga"
	"Megha Mo Premika"
	"Sraabana Re Sraabana Megha Aanibu"
	"To Prema Re Thila Kete Chhalana"
Bada Danda Dhuli	"Mana Jaane Mora Paapa"
To Chehera	"Tame Jebe Hasidela Mate Chahni Chahni"

== Assamese songs ==
=== Film songs ===
Year	Film	Song	Music director	Lyricist
1994	Hridayor Are Are	"Moromi Moromi Piya"	Dilu Hazarika	
1998	Joubane Amoni Kore	"Agoli Bahore Gogona Bojai"	Jitul Sonowal	Pratima Das
1999	Bukur Majot Jwole	"Hullo Bosoriya"	Charu Gohain, Bhupen Uzir, Jayanta Das	

=== Non-film songs ===
Year	Album	Song	Composer	Lyricist	Co-Artist
1988	Priyotoma	"Phagunore"			solo
1988	Priyotoma	"Bhoniti O Bhoniti"			solo
1998	Snigdha Junak	"Ei Kinu Hoi Jai"	Zubeen Garg		Solo
1998	Snigdha Junak	"Collegeya Dinor Kotha"	Zubeen Garg		Solo
1999	Meghor Boron	"Purnima Jun Tumi"	Zubeen Garg	Zubeen Garg	Zubeen Garg, Mahalaxmi Iyer, Sagarika Mukherjee
1999	Mitha Mitha Bedona	"Kon Baru Tumi Aanami"	Manas Robin	Gunjan Phukan	Mili Baruah
2000	Tumi Mur Priya	"Phoolam Koi Ganusha"	Abhijeet Barman		Deepa Narayan

== Rajasthani film songs ==
Year	Film	Song name(s)	Music director(s)	Co-singer(s)
2013	Dastoor	"Mhara Chhal Bhawer"		Pamela Jain

== See also ==
- List of songs recorded by Udit Narayan
- Bollywood selected discography of Udit Narayan
