= Kahe Gaye Pardes Piya =

- Directed by: Sabir Shiekh
- Starring: Tanveer Zaidi, Sanjay Swaraj, Mansi Pandey, Nupur, Ahsan Khan, Sambhavna Seth, and others
- Release date: 2009
- Country: India
- Languages: Awadhi, Hindi

Kahe Gaye Pardes Piya is a 2009 Awadhi/Hindi feature film directed by Sabir Shiekh and starring Tanveer Zaidi, Sanjay Swaraj, Sambhavna Seth, and Mansi. The film was released in approximately two hundred cities and was declared a hit movie. Kahe Gaye Pardesh Piya ran successfully all over the country. It was premiered at Allahabad.

== Plot ==
Tanveer Zaidi is playing a Good Samaritan cop, who accidentally kills an innocent person in an encounter. How he takes care of the family of the deceased is one of the interesting plots in the movie. The story revolves around a Police Inspector of Mumbai Ansh (Tanveer Zaidi), who finds himself guilty for the killing of an innocent villager Prabhat (Sanjay Swaraj) who was unknowingly working for a Bad man (Ahsan Khan) in Mumbai, Ansh (Tanveer) gets permission to go to Prabhat's village Sonkhari, Bhadohi, U.P to find the real culprits, he does so, CAS rest of the story is associated with Prabhat's (Sanjay) wife (Mansi Pandey), Ansh's (Tanveer) girl friend Nupur etc.

Sambhavna Seth who is in limelight because of her popular stint with Big Boss-2 is also played an important role in the movie

== Cast ==
- Tanveer Zaidi – Police Inspector Ansh,
- Sanjay Swaraj – Prabhat
- Sambhavna Seth – Dancer
- Mansi Pandey – Wife of Prabhat,
- Nupur – Lover of Police Inspector Ansh,
- Ahsan Khan – Brother of Nupur
- others-K.K.Shukla, K.K.Goswami, Govind Khatri, K. Kumar, Sri Gaud, Poonam Singh, Riya Walia, Akhilesh, Ratan Rathod, Baby Anamika Rajendra Artiste, Awdhesh Tiwari.
