= Roshni Chopra =

Indian actress, host, and model (born 1984)

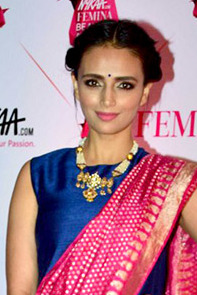
- Chopra in 2017.
- Born: New Delhi, India
- Occupations: Model, actress and television presenter
- Years active: 2001–present
- Spouse: Siddharth Kumar Anand (m. 2006)
- Children: 2
- Parent(s): Ravi Chopra (Father); Manju Chopra (Mother)
- Relatives: Deeya Chopra (sister)

Roshni Chopra is an Indian actress, television presenter and the winner of NDTV Imagine's reality show. Dil Jeetegi Desi Girl. She is also known for playing the role of Pia one of the three female leads in the Zee TV series Kasamh Se.

== Career ==
She is best known for playing the role of Pia, one of the three female leads and the younger sister of protagonist Bani Walia in Kasamh Se on Zee TV. An alumnus of the Our Own English High School, she was also the presenter of the pre- and post-match cricket show on Doordarshan, known as Fourth Umpire.

Chopra starred in Vikram Bhatt's film, Phhir, which released on 12 August 2011. She hosted the show Comedy Circus Teen Ka Tadka on Sony TV in 2009–10 and is the anchor of Heroes – Moments and Memories on Star Sports. She also made an appearance in Maut Ka Khel, an episode of the horror TV series Aahat on Sony TV. She worked in Comedy Nights with Kapil on Colors TV.

She was seen in the show Pyaar Mein Twist, which aired on Star Plus from 29 January 2011.

She participated in the Paris Haute Couture Week Fall/Winter 2023-2024 in Paris.

== Personal life ==
Chopra's younger sister, Deeya Chopra, is also an actress. Chopra is married to filmmaker Siddharth Anand Kumar. She has two children.

== Filmography ==
=== Films ===
Movie	Role	Year
Let's Enjoy	Sonal	2004
Bhram: An Illusion	Nidhi	2008
Phhir	Sia	2011

=== Television ===
Serial	Channel
Kasamh Se	Zee TV
Chak De Bachche	9X
India's Got Talent	Colors TV
Comedy Circus	Sony Entertainment Television
Dil Jeetegi Desi Girl	Imagine TV
Pyaar Mein Twist	Star Plus
Comedy Ka Maha Muqabala	Star Plus
Aahat	Sony Entertainment Television
Comedy Circus Ka Naya Daur	Sony Entertainment Television
Kkavyanjali	Star Plus
Comedy Nights with Kapil	Colors TV
Akbar Birbal (Episode 119–120)	Big Magic
Heroes – Moments and Memories	Star Sports
Nagin – Ichchadhari Naghin Storey	Colors TV
The Kapil Sharma Show	Sony Entertainment Television
The Drama Company	Sony Entertainment Television
