= Selected Hindi discography of Udit Narayan =

Udit Narayan Jha (born 1 December 1955) is a playback singer who works in Bollywood and whose songs have been featured mainly in Hindi language, Nepali and Bollywood movies. Besides Nepali and Hindi, he has sung in 36 languages. He has won three National Film Awards and five Filmfare Awards. He is the only male singer in the history of the Filmfare Awards to have won over three decades (winning in the 80s, 90s, and 2000s). Udit Narayan was awarded the Padma Shri in 2009 and, in 2016, he was awarded the Padma Bhushan by the Government of India, an honour that has so far been awarded to only a handful of singers, in recognition of his achievements in various film industries across India. He was also awarded the Prabal Gorkha Dakshin Bahu by the late King of Nepal Birendra Bir Bikram Shah Dev in 2001 and Chitragupta Cineyatra Samman 2015 for Bhojpuri Cinema. He has sung over 25000 songs over 36 languages as many as 21 of his tracks feature in BBC's "Top 40 Bollywood Soundtracks of all time".

== Bollywood selected discography ==
Year	Film	Song name(s)	Music Director(s)	Lyrics	Co-singer(s)	
1980	Unees-Bees	"Mil Gaya"	Rajesh Roshan		Mohammed Rafi, Usha Mangeshkar	
1981	Sannata	"Sun Jaane Jaa"	Rajesh Roshan		Alka Yagnik	
1983	Bade Dil Wala	"Jeevan Ke Din"	R D Burman		Lata Mangeshkar, Baby Preeti	
1983	1983	Kehdo Pyar Hai	"O Bindiya Tum Humse Keh Do Pyar Hai"	Bappi Lahiri		Kishore Kumar, Suresh Wadkar
1986	Tan-Badan	"Meri Nayi Bansi Ki Dhun"	Anand Milind		Solo	
1988	Qayamat Se Qayamat Tak	"Ae Mere Humsafar", "Papa Kehte Hai"	Anand–Milind		Alka Yagnik, Solo	
1988	Pyaar Ka Mandir	"Log Jahan Par Rehte Hain"	Laxmikant Pyarelal		Mohammad Aziz, Kavita Krishnamurthy, Suresh Wadkar	
1989	Lal Dupatta Malmal Ka	"Lal Dupatta Malmal Ka", "Na Jaane Kyun Main Bekraar"	Anand–Milind		Anuradha Paudwal	
1990	Dil	"Mujhe Need Na Aye", "Hum Ne Ghar Choda Hai", "Hum Pyar Karne Wale"	Anand–Milind		Anuradha Paudwal, Sadhana Sargam	
1990	Aashiqui	"Mera Dil Tere Liye Dhadakta Hai"	Nadeem-Shravan		Anuradha Paudwal	
1991	Hum	"Ek Doosre Se Karte Hain Pyar Hum"	Laxmikant–Pyarelal		Sudesh Bhosle, Mohammad Aziz	
1991	Phool Aur Kaante	"I Love You"	Nadeem-Shravan		Alisha Chinai	
1991	Yaara Dildara	"Bin Tere Sanam Mar Mitenge Hum", "Tum Hi Hamari Ho Manzil"	Jatin–Lalit		Kavita Krishnamurthy, Anuradha Paudwal	
1991	Narsimha	"Hum Se Tum Dosti Kar Lo"	Laxmikant-Pyarelal		Alka Yagnik	
1992	Beta	"Dhak Dhak Karne Laga", "Koyal Si Teri Boli"	Anand–Milind		Anuradha Paudwal	
1992	Chamatkar	"Jawani Deewani"	Anu Malik		Anu Malik, Poornima	
1992	Vishwatma	"Aankhon Mein Hai Kya", "Dil Le Gayi Teri Bindiya"	Viju Shah		Alka Yagnik, Mohammad Aziz, Amit Kumar, Sapna Mukherjee	
1992	Jo Jeeta Wohi Sikandar	"Pehla Nasha", "Yahan Ke Hum Sikandar"	Jatin–Lalit		Sadhana Sargam, Jatin, Lalit	
1993	Anari	"Phoolo Sa Chera Tera", "Rona Chahe Ro Na Paaye"	Anand–Milind			
1993	Darr	"Jaadu Teri Nazar", "Tu Mere Samne"	Shiv-Hari		Solo, Lata Mangeshkar	
1993	Kabhi Haan Kabhi Naa	"Dewaana Dil Dewaana"	Jatin–Lalit		Amit Kumar	
1994	Mohra	"Tu Cheez Badi Hai Mast Mast", "Tip Tip Barsa Paani"	Viju Shah		Kavita Krishnamurthy, Alka Yagnik	
1995	Rangeela	"Kya Karen Ke Na Karen", "Yaroon Sun Lo Zara"	A.R. Rahman		Solo, Chitra	
1995	Dilwale Dulhaniya Le Jayenge	"Ruk Ja O Dil Deewane", "Ho Gaya Hai Tujko To Pyar Sajna", "Mehndi Laga Ke Rakhna"	Jatin–Lalit		Solo, Lata Mangeshkar	
1995	Akele Hum Akele Tum	"Raja Ko Rani Se Pyar Ho Gaya"	Anu Malik		Alka Yagnik	
1995	Ram Jaane	"Ram Jaane"	Anu Malik		Alka Yagnik, Sonu Nigam	
1996	Raja Hindustani	"Aaye Ho Meri Zindagi Mein", "Pardesi Pardesi", "Kitna Pyaara Tujhe Rab Ne"	Nadeem-Shravan		Solo, Sapna Awasthi, Alka Yagnik	
1996	Diljale	"Ho Nahin Sakta"	Anu Malik		Solo	
1996	Khamoshi	"Jaana Suno Hum Tum Pe Marte Hain", "Saagar Kinare Bhi Do Dil Hain Pyaase"	Jatin–Lalit		Solo, Sulakshana Pandit, Jatin Pandit	
1997	Mohabbat	"Dil Ki Dhadkan Kehti Hai"	Nadeem-Shravan		Kavita Krishnamurthy	
1997	Ishq	"Ishq Hua Kaise Hua", "Dekho Dekho Jaanam", "Neend Churai Meri"	Anu Malik		Vibha Sharma, Alka Yagnik, Kumar Sanu, Kavita Krishnamurthy	
1997	Dil To Pagal Hai	"Dil To Pagal Hai", "Bholi Si Surat", "Are Re Are"	Uttam Singh		Lata Mangeshkar	
1997	Hero No. 1	"Sona Kitna Sona Hai", "Mohabbat Ki Nahin Jati"	Anand–Milind		Poornima, Sadhana Sargam	
1998	Kuch Kuch Hota Hai	"Koi Mil Gaya", "Kuch Kuch Hota Hai", "Yeh Ladka Hai Deewana", "Tujhe Yaad Na Meri Aayee"	Jatin–Lalit		Kavita Krishnamurthy, Alka Yagnik, Manpreet Akhtar	
1998	Jab Pyaar Kisise Hota Hai	"Is Dil Mein Kya Hai"	Jatin–Lalit		Lata Mangeshkar	
1998	Pyaar Kiya To Darna Kya	"Deewana Main Chala", "Chhad Zid Karna", "Oh Baby... Ho Gaya So Ho Gaya"	Jatin–Lalit, Himesh Reshammiya		Solo, Anuradh Paudwal, Kavita Krishnamurthy	
1998	Kudrat	"Aaj Hoke Rahe Apna Milan", "Deewane Do Dil Mile"	Rajesh Roshan		Preeti Uttam, Alka Yagnik	
1998	Dil Se..	"E Ajnabi"	A.R. Rahman		Mahalakshmi Iyer	
1999	Mann	"Mera Mann", "Chaha Hai Tujko", "Khushiyan Aur Gham", "Nasha Ye Pyar Ka Nasha"	Sanjeev-Darshan		Alka Yagnik, Sadhana Sargam, Anuradha Paudwal	
1999	Hum Dil De Chuke Sanam	"Chand Chupa Badal Mein"	Ismail Darbar		Alka Yagnik	
1999	Taal	"Taal Se Taal Mila"	A.R. Rahman		Alka Yagnik	
1999	Hum Saath-Saath Hain	"Chhote Chhote Bhaiyon Ke", "Mhare Hiwda", "Hum Saath-Saath Hain"	Raam Laxman		Hariharan, Kumar Sanu, Kavita Krishnamurthy, Anuradha Paudwal, Alka Yagnik	
1999	Dil Kya Kare	"Dil Kya Kare", "Do Dilon Di"	Jatin–Lalit		Alka Yagnik, Anuradha Paudwal	
1999	Jaanam Samjha Karo	"Chandni Aaya Hai Tera Deewana"	Anu Malik		Solo	
2000	Dhadkan	"Dil Ne Yeh Kaha Hai Dil Se", "Na Na Karte Pyar"	Nadeem-Shravan		Alka Yagnik, Kumar Sanu	
2000	Mission Kashmir	"Chupke Se Sun", "Socho Ke Jheelon Ka"	Shankar–Ehsaan–Loy		Alka Yagnik	
2000	Har Dil Jo Pyar Karega	"Har Dil Jo Pyar Karega", "Dil Dil Deewana"	Anu Malik		Alka Yagnik	
2000	Kaho Naa... Pyaar Hai	"Kaho Naa Pyaar Hai", "Pyaar Ki Kashti Mein"	Rajesh Roshan		Alka Yagnik	
2000	Mohabbatein	"Soni Soni", "Humko Humise Chura Lo", "Zinda Rehti Hai Mohabbatein", "Aankhein Khuli"	Jatin–Lalit		Jaspinder Narula, Lata Mangeshkar, Shweta Pandit	
2001	Kabhi Khushi Kabhie Gham	"Bole Chudiyan", "Yeh Ladka Hai Allah"	Jatin–Lalit		Sonu Nigam, Alka Yagnik	
2001	Pyaar Ishq Aur Mohabbat	"Pyaar Ishq Aur Mohabbat", "Jab Tujhe Maine Dekha"	Viju Shah		Alka Yagnik, Sadhana Sargam	
2001	Gadar	"Main Nikla", "Udhja Kaale Kawwa"	Uttam Singh		Solo; Alka Yagnik, Nihar S	
2001	Lagaan	"Radha Kaise Na Jale", "Mitwa", "Ghanan Ghanan", "O Ri Chori"	A.R. Rahman		Asha Bhosle, Vaishali, Sukhwinder Singh, Alka Yagnik, Srinivas, Shankar Mahadevan, Shaan, Vasundhara Das	
2001	Chori Chori Chupke Chupke	"Dekhne Waalon Ne"	Anu Malik		Alka Yagnik	
2001	Dil Chahta Hai	"Jaane Kyon"	Shankar–Ehsaan–Loy		Alka Yagnik	
2002	Devdas	"Chhalak Chhalak", "Woh Chand Jasi", Hamesha Tumko Chaaha	Ismail Darbar		Vinod Rathod, Shreya Ghoshal, Kavita Krishnamurthy	
2002	Kranti	"Dil Mein Dard Sa Jaga Hai"	Jatin-Lalit	Anand Bakshi	Alka Yagnik	
2002	Raaz	"Jo Bhi Kasmein"	Nadeem-Shravan		Alka Yagnik	
2002	Yeh Hai Jalwa	"Dhire Dhire", "Chuudi Khankayi Re"	Himesh Reshammiya		Alka Yagnik	
2002	Kasoor	"Kitna Bechain Hoke", "Zindagi Ban Gaye Ho Tum"	Nadeem-Shravan		Alka Yagnik	
2003	Tere Naam	"Tumse Milna", "Tere Naam", "Chand", "O Jaana"	Himesh Reshammiya		Alka Yagnik, Shaan, Kamaal Khan, KK	
2003	Koi... Mil Gaya	"Koi Mil Gaya", "Idhar Chala Main Udhar Chala"	Rajesh Roshan		K.S. Chitra, Alka Yagnik	
2003	Chalte Chalte	"Dagriya Chalo"	Jatin–Lalit, Aadesh Shrivastava		Alka Yagnik	
2004	Aabra Ka Daabra	"Chutkan Gang"	Himesh Reshammiya			
2004	Aan: Men at Work	"Hamate Baad"	Anu Malik			
2004	Ab Tumhare Hawale Watan Saathiyo	"Ab Tumhare Hawale"	Anu Malik			
2004	Ab Tumhare Hawale Watan Saathiyo	"Ab Tumhare Hawale"(Version ll)	Anu Malik			
2004	Ab Tumhare Hawale Watan Saathiyo	"Humein Tumse Hua"	Anu Malik			
2004	Ab Tumhare Hawale Watan Saathiyo	"Mere Sarpe Dupatta"	Anu Malik			
2004	Aetbaar	"Chhodo Chhodo"	Rajesh Roshan			
2004	Agnipankh	"Mera Dil Fida Hai Tujhpe"(Version)	Pritam			
2004	Agnipankh	"Mera Dil Fida Hai Tujhpe"(Version ll)	Pritam			
2004	Aitraaz	"Aankhen Bandh Karke"	Himesh Reshammiya			
2004	Aitraaz	"Tala Tum Tala Tum"	Himesh Reshammiya			
2004	Aitraaz	"Woh Tassavvur"	Himesh Reshammiya			
2004	Aitraaz	"Nazar Aa Raha Hai"	Himesh Reshammiya			
2004	Aitraaz	"Aankhen Bandh Karke"(Remix)	Himesh Reshammiya			
2004	Aitraaz	"Tala Tum Tala Tum"(Remix)	Himesh Reshammiya			
2004	Aitraaz	"Woh Tassavvur"(Remix)	Himesh Reshammiya			
2004	Aitraaz	"Nazar Aa Raha Hai"(Remix)	Himesh Reshammiya			
2004	Asambhav	"Teri Dekh Dekh Ladkaiyan"	Viju Shah			
2004	Bardaasht	"Silsile Mulaqaton Ke"	Himesh Reshammiya			
2004	Bardaasht	"Dil Mera Dil Na Maane"	Himesh Reshammiya			
2004	Chameli	"Jaane Kyon Humko"(Duet)	Sandesh Shandilya			
2004	Deewaar	"Chaliye Va Chaliye"	Aadesh Shrivastava			
2004	Deewaar	"Todenge Deewaar Hum"	Aadesh Shrivastava			
2004	Dil Bechara Pyaar Ka Maara	"Dil Bechara Pyaar Ka Maata"(Duet)	Nikhil–Vinay			
2004	Dil Bechara Pyaar Ka Maara	"Dil Bechara Pyaar Ka Maata"(Male)	Nikhil–Vinay			
2004	Dil Maange More	"Maine Chun Liya"	Himesh Reshammiya			
2004	Dil Ne Jise Apna Kahaa	"Bindiya Chamakne"	Himesh Reshammiya			
2004	Dil Ne Jise Apna Kahaa	"Meri Nas Nas Mein"	Himesh Reshammiya			
2004	Fida	"Aaja Ve Mahi"	Anu Malik			
2004	Fida	"Nazar Nazar"	Anu Malik			
2004	Fida	"Dil Mera Na Aur"	Anu Malik			
2004	Fida	"Ek Tu Hai"	Anu Malik			
2004	Fida	"Ye Dil Jigar Jhuki Nazar"	Anu Malik			
2004	Garv: Pride & Honour	"Hum Tumko Nigahon Mein"	Sajid–Wajid			
2005	Anjaane	"O Maahive Re O Maahive"	Himesh Reshammiya		Alka Yagnik	
2005	Barsaat	"Chori Chori"	Nadeem–Shravan		Alka Yagnik, Sapna Awasthi	
2005	Bewafaa	"Ek Dilruba Hai"	Nadeem–Shravan			
2005	Blackmail	"Akhiyaan Lada Jaa"	Himesh Reshammiya			
2005	Blackmail	"Kaun Kehata Hai"	Himesh Reshammiya			
2005	Blackmail	"Akhiyaan Lada Jaa"	Himesh Reshammiya			
2005	Mangal Pandey: The Rising	"Holi Re"	A. R. Rahman			
2005	Rog	"Khoobsoorat"	M. M. Keeravani			
2006	Don: The Chase Begins Again	"Khaike Paan Banaraswala"	Shankar–Ehsaan–Loy		Solo	
2006	Vivah	"Do Anjane Ajnabi", "Mujhe Haq Hai", "Milan Abhi Adha Adhura Hai"	Ravindra Jain		Shreya Ghoshal	
2007	Partner	"Do U Wanna Partner"	Sajid–Wajid		Shaan, Sajid–Wajid, Suzanne D'Mello	
2007	Om Shanti Om	"Deewangi Deewangi"	Vishal–Shekhar		Shaan, Shreya Ghoshal, Sunidhi Chauhan, Rahul Saxena	
2008	Tashan	"Falak Tak Chal Saath Meray", "Dil Dance Maare"	Vishal–Shekhar		Mahalakshmi Iyer; Sunidhi Chauhan, Sukhwinder Singh	
2008	God Tussi Great Ho	"Lal Chunariya"	Sajid–Wajid		Alka Yagnik	
2008	Mere Baap Pehle Aap	"Main Hawaon Ke"	Tauseef Akhtar		Shreya Ghoshal	
2008	Gumnaam – The Mystery	"Mohabbat Hai Tumse", "Mohabbat Se Zyada"	Nadeem-Shravan		Monica Nath, Shreya Ghoshal	
2009	What's Your Raashee?	"Sau Janam"	Sohail Sen		Madhushree, Sohail Sen	
2009	Blue	"Yaar Mila Tha"	A.R. Rahman		Madhushree	
2010	Life Express	"Pyar Ka Namak"			Shreya Ghoshal	
2010	Isi Life Mein	"Tum Darshan Hum Naina", "Apna Kaun Paraya Kauna"			Solo	
2010	Four Friends	"Yeh Dosti"			Shankar Mahadevan	
2011	When Harry Tries to Marry	"Dulhe Raja"			Madhushree	
2011	Tum Hi To Ho	"Dil Ne Mere Dil Ne"	Anand–Milind		Shreya Ghoshal	
2011	Shivam	"Khoye Se Hum Khoye Se Tum",			Alka Yagnik	
2011	College Campus	"Dum Bhar Na Dum Lenge" "Ishq Mein Ruswai Bhi"	Atul / Lyrics-Sahil Sultanpuri		Vinod Rathod, Manjeera Fareed Sabri	
2012	Agneepath	"Gun Gun Guna"	Ajay–Atul		Sunidhi Chauhan	
2012	Joker	"Jugnu"	G. V. Prakash Kumar		Solo	
2012	Rang (Album)	"Khuda Ki Kasam"	Nadeem Shravan		Shreya Ghoshal	
2012	Student of the Year	"Radha"	Vishal–Shekhar		Shreya Ghoshal, Vishal Dadlani	
2012	The Real Life Of Mandi	"Bahon Mein Bahon Ko"	Dinesh Arjuna		Shreya Ghoshal	
2012	Akkad Bakkad Bambe Bo	"Ya Habibi"	Harish Mangoli		Sunidhi Chauhan	
2013	Rajdhani Express	"Karte Hain Dil Se"	Lahu Madhav, Ritesh Nalini		Solo	
2013	Gunja – A wonder Girl	"Manjhi Re Manjhi Re"	Abuzar		Solo	
2013	Deewana Main Deewana	"Ek Haseena Ek Deewana", "Judaa Na Honge Hum"	Anand Raj Anand, Bappi Lahiri		Anuradha Paudwal, Sadhana Sargam	
2013	ABCD – Any Body Can Dance	"Psycho Re"	Sachin Jigar		Mika Singh	
2013	Beehad – The Ravines	Neta Hai Bhai Neta Hai	Ravindra Jain		Vinod Rathod	
2013	Bombay Talkies	Bombay Talkies	Amit Trivedi		Alka Yagnik, Kumar Sanu, Kavita Krishnamurthy, Sonu Nigam, Shreya Ghoshal, Shaan, Sukhwinder Singh, KK, Mohit Chauhan	
2013	Gippi	Naam Baby Se Baby Doll Hui Gava	Vishal–Shekhar		Sukhwinder Singh	
2014	Humpty Sharma Ki Dulhania	"Daingad Daingad "	Sachin–Jigar		Sachin–Jigar, Divya Kumar, Akriti Kakkar, Pratibha Baghel, Deepali Sathe, Niharika Sinha	
2014	Bazaar-E-Husn	"Pyaar Ki Duniya Basai Hai"	Mohammed Zahur Khayyam		Kavita Krishnamurthy	
2014	Entertainment	"Teri Mahima Aprampar"	Sachin–Jigar		Anushka Manchanda	
2014	Life is Beautiful!	"Manzilein"	John Hunt		Alka Yagnik	
2014	Kill Dil	"Daiyaa Maiyaa"	Shankar–Ehsaan–Loy		Shankar Mahadevan, Rasika Shekar, & Jaaved Jaffrey	
2014	Money Back Guarantee	"Inke Lane Gaye The"	Sunil Pal		Sunil Pal	
2015	Hey Bro	"Birju"	Nitz ‘N’ Sony		Mika Singh	
2015	Lateef	"Chain Milta Nahien"	Yasin Darbar		Sadhna Singh, Shahid Mallya	
2015	Guddu Ki Gun	"Bihari Valentine"	Raju Sardar		Solo	
2015	Moonlight Whispers (Album)	"Raat Bhar Chand", "Toota Tara", "Zindagi Ki Baat Thi"	Vivek Prakash		Solo, Mahalaxmi Iyer	
2016	Jai Gangaajal	"Joganiya"	Salim–Sulaiman		Solo	
2016	Anna (2016 film)	"Annapurna Dharti"	Ravindra Jain		Solo	
2016	Brahmand Nayak Sai Baba	"Brahmand Nayak Sai Baba", "Toote To Toote Khilone", "Utho Sai Ankh Kholo"			Solo, Suresh Wadkar, Kunal Ganjawala	
2017	Machine	"Cheez Badi"	Tanishk Bagchi		Neha Kakkar	
2018	Love Per Square Foot	"Ishq Mein Bajti Hai Ghanti"	Sohail Sen		Solo	
2018	Happy Phirr Bhag Jayegi	"Kudiye Ni Tere"	Sohail Sen		Shivangi Bhayana	
2018	Loveratri	"Dholida"	Tanishk Bagchi		Palak Muchhal, Neha Kakkar, Raja Hasan	
2019	Rangeela Raja	"Dholi Dol Baja"	Ishwar Kumar		Shreya Ghoshal, Dev Negi, Ishwar Kumar	
2019	Super 30	"Jugraafiya"	Ajay–Atul		Shreya Ghoshal	
2019	Sye Raa Narasimha Reddy	"Jaago Narsimha Jaago Re"	Amit Trivedi		Shankar Mahadevan, Shaan	
2019	Rizwan	"Aaao Sabko Sikhlaye"	Sohail Sen		solo	
2020	Street Dancer 3D	"Sabse Aage Honge Hindustani (Remake)"	Harsh Upadhyay		Shankar Mahadevan	
2020	Sooryavanshi	"Tip Tip Barsa Paani (Remake)"	Tanishk Bagchi		Alka Yagnik	
2020	Coolie No. 1 (2020 film)	"Mummy Kassam"	Tanishk Bagchi		Monali Thakur, Ikka Singh	
2021	Kaagaz	"Bailgaadi"	Pravesh Mallick		Alka Yagnik	
2021	Om Namah Shivay- from T-series	"OM Namah Shivay"	Anis ali sabri		Solo	
2021	Taareef	"Title Song"	Anuj Bhatt		Solo	
2021	Itwaar-short film	"Mann bhala toh sab bhala"	Shantanu Sudame		solo	
2021	Bhuj: The Pride of India	Rammo Rammo	Tanishk Bagchi		Neeti Mohan, Palak Muchhal	
2021	Bhavai	"Mohe Ram Rang Rang De"	Shabbir Ahmed		Shreya Ghoshal	
2023	Selfiee	"Main Khiladi Tu Anari 2.O"	Rashmi Virag		Abhijeet Bhattacharya	
2023	A winter tale at Shimla	TBA	Avik Dutta		TBA	
2023	Gadar 2	"Udd Jaa Kaale Kaava", "Main nikla gaddi leke","Udd Jaa Kaale Kaava(Climax version)"	Mithoon		Alka Yagnik, Aditya Narayan, Jubin Nautiyal	
2024	Srikanth	""Papa Kehte Hain (Reprise)""	Adithya dev		Solo	
2024	Bad Newz (film)	"Mere Mehboob Mere Sanam"	Lijo-DJ Chetas		Alka Yagnik	
2024	Emergency (2024 film)	"Singhasan Khali Karo"	G. V. Prakash Kumar		Nakash Aziz, Nakul Abhyankar	

1999 International khiladi "yaar maine ek sapna dekha" solo aadesh shrivastav

2004 madhoshi " o jaane jaana " sadhna sargam roop Kumar rathore

2005 Garam Masala "falak dekhoon (reprise)" pritam

2008 black & white "yeh hindostan hai" sukhvinder Singh

2003 chupke se "koi to ho" unknown

2004 dil mange more "Maine chun liya" shreya ghoshal himesh reshmiyya

2003 dil pardesi ho gaya "tu kaun kaha se" usha khanna

== See also ==
- List of songs recorded by Udit Narayan
- List of regional songs recorded by Udit Narayan
