= Raaz Pichhle Janam Ka =

- Genre: Reality
- Directed by: Shruti Anindita Vermaa
- Presented by: VIVEK KISHAN
- Country of origin: India
- Original language: Hindi
- No. of seasons: 2

Production
- Running time: 58 minutes

Original release
- Network: NDTV Imagine
- Release: 7 December 2009 – 29 January 2011

Raaz Pichhle Janm Ka is an Indian reality television series created by Supavitra Babul, based around the technique of past life regression. The NDTV Imagine show is hosted by actor Ravi Kishan, while the past life regression sessions are conducted by a Mumbai-based psychologist Trupti Jayin. The first season started on 7 December 2009 and 15 January 2010, while the second season started on 23 October 2010, with actor Chunky Panday as guest.

Participants include a mixture of invited celebrities and ordinary people selected through a phone-in process. Celebrity participants have included Shekhar Suman, Monica Bedi, Celina Jaitley, Payal Rohatgi and Manvendra Singh Gohil.

== Concept ==
The show opens with the guest explaining a particular problem, usually a fear they are facing and wishes to find a solution or insight into. Thereafter they are taken through an extended past life regression session, edited for television.

=== Past-life regression ===
Past life regression is a technique that uses hypnosis to recover what practitioners allege are memories of past lives or incarnations. The practice is widely considered discredited and unscientific by medical practitioners, and experts generally regard claims of recovered memories of past lives as fantasies or delusions or a type of confabulation. Past-life regression is typically undertaken either in pursuit of a spiritual experience, or in a psychotherapeutic setting. Most advocates loosely adhere to beliefs about reincarnation, though religious traditions that incorporate reincarnation generally do not include the idea of repressed memories of past lives.

In the show, as explained by the show's therapist, Dr. Tripti Jayin, the patient are first taken into in a state of progressive relaxation, followed by an alpha-theta meditation through the visualization of light and then supposedly 'taken back' into the past to know the reason for things that trouble them in this birth. Some of the events are dramatized as the participant narrates certain incidents, and in the end talks about the experience.

=== Recalled information ===
Many of the participants have purportedly recalled information from the past. For example, Swati Singh, who appeared in the first episode, purportedly correctly recalled information about the 1966 Air India Flight 101 crash incident (24 January 1966), in which she claimed that she was an Indian sailor with the last name Singh, and in this flight the eminent Indian physicist Dr. Homi J. Bhabha had also died.

== Views of the Medical Community ==
Past life regression is widely considered discredited and unscientific by medical practitioners, and experts generally regard claims of recovered memories of past lives as fantasies or delusions or a type of confabulation. A 2006 survey found that a majority of a sample of doctoral level mental health professionals rated "Past Lives" therapy as "certainly discredited" as a treatment for mental or behavioral disorders.

In an interview with the Indian express specifically about this show, most psychiatrists said they do not believe in this therapy, Dr. Anshuman Mittal, a psychiatrist based in Patiala, says it is all about "fooling people. [...] There is no way one can dive into his or her past life. It is only a persons' supposition, his imagination, which comes out in a state of hypnosis."

== Controversies ==
Some people and organizations have raised doubts over the credibility and reality of the show. Much of the past-life regression process is also not shown on television, so it can't be confirmed whether the process is real or not. No explanation has been given by NDTV Imagine in this regard.

=== Statutory notice ===
Bharat Jan Vigyan Jathan, an independent Indian organisation, obtained a statutory notice issued by the Punjab and Haryana High Court to NDTV Imagine for allegedly spreading superstition through the show. It also asked the channel for a public debate in the presence of experts and scientists and prove its credence scientifically.

== Season 1 ==
=== Episodes ===
The first series of Raaz Pichhle Janam Ka began on 7 December 2009 and ended on 15 January 2010. Episodes were aired on NDTV Imagine nightly from Monday to Friday at 9:30pm. It was originally planned to have 20 episodes but this was extended to 40. The season finale revisited the participants post their experience on the show and explored the impact the show had made on their lives.

In early 2010 the makers of the show, The Ideas Box Entertainment Pvt. Ltd. were said to be planning a second season, which was again planned to have 20 episodes.

=== Celebrity Participants ===
- Mishal Raheja, saw himself as a king during the Moghul era who was betrayed by his people and pushed from a cliff. Before the procedure he told that he was afraid of heights.
- Shekhar Suman, met his dead son.
- Celina Jaitley, saw herself as a German soldier fighting and dying in action in World War II in her first past life regression and as a happily married woman from the US in her second past life regression.
- Payal Rohatgi, saw herself as a boy in her previous life who was betrayed by his lover.
- Monica Bedi, saw herself as a Portuguese woman, a self-sacrificing mother of three kids who watched helplessly as her ex-husband died in a car accident.
- Manvendra Singh Gohil (Prince of Rajpipla and gay rights activist), saw himself as a poor farmer, and in a tragic accident while crossing a river, he lost his son. Manvendra's wife gets extremely disturbed at the loss of their son and this strongly affects their married life.
- Sambhavna Seth, saw herself as a Muslim woman, whose uncle had killed her after molesting her.
- Ravi Kishan (host of the show), saw himself as a 'Naga Sadhu' in Manali, Himachal Pradesh during the 1890s and tried to obtain moksha but failed; as certain circumstances that led him to commit not one, but three murders in his past life thereby altering his life forever.
- Eva Grover (Famous TV star and ex-wife of actor Haider who happens to be Aamir Khan's step brother).

== Season 2 ==
Season 2 started on 23 October 2010, with same host Ravi Kishen and clinical psychologist-analyst Dr. Trupti Jayin, in an initial run of 20 episodes once a week, broadcast on Saturdays at 9.00 pm. The shooting started around 1 August 2010 at a studio in Trombay, and first guest was actor Chunky Pandey. Other guests would include Mahima Chaudhary and Shakti Kapoor.

== See also ==
- Reincarnation
- Past life regression
