= Sambhavna Seth =

Indian television actress

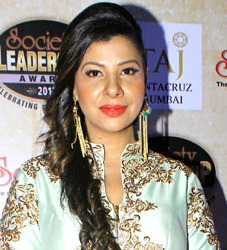
- Seth in 2017
- Born: Delhi, India
- Other names: Bhojpuri Helen and Dancing Queen
- Occupations: Actress, model
- Years active: 1998-present
- Known for: Bigg Boss 2; Fear Factor: Khatron Ke Khiladi 4; Bigg Boss 8
- Spouse: Avinash Dwivedi (m. 2016)
- Children: 2

Sambhavna Seth is an Indian actor, model, dancer, and vlogger. She is best known for her Performance in Bhojpuri item Songs. She has also participated in various reality shows like Bigg Boss 2, Raaz Pichhle Janam Ka, Dil Jeetegi Desi Girl, Fear Factor: Khatron Ke Khiladi 4, Welcome – Baazi Mehmaan Nawazi Ki, Bigg Boss Halla Bol. She has also been a part of several Hindi TV serial such as Razia Sultan, Gudiya Hamari Sabhi Pe Bhari. She also participated in Colors TV reality show Dancing Queen and emerged as the winner.

== Early life and education ==
Sambhavna Seth was born in 1980. Seth completed her graduation Studies from Maitreyi College. Then she started working as a model after completing her graduation in Delhi.

== Career ==
Seth started her career as a dancer in various item songs. She appeared in many item songs in Bhojpuri films such as Roop rang ki nagri, Lenga mein virus, Nashe Nashe uthatha, Jung, and Kamar jab lachkela. She has also played a small role in Hindi film like kids no 1, 36 China Town. She then appeared in Paagalpan. Then she performed in various item songs including Aak kal tere mere pyar ke charche, and Boliyan.

In 2008, she took part in the reality TV show Bigg Boss which aired on Colors channel. While on the show, she became famous for her arguments and a kiss with Raja Chaudhary.

After Bigg Boss, she has participated in other Reality show such as Raaz Pichhle Janam Ka, Dil Jeetegi Desi Girl, and Welcome – Baazi Mehmaan Nawazi Ki.

In 2009, She also participated in Colors TV reality show Dancing Queen and emerged as the winner.

In 2011, she participated in the stunt-based reality TV show Fear Factor: Khatron Ke Khiladi 4, where she finished at 13th place.

She later entered Bigg Boss Halla Bol as a contestant. The show was hosted by the Farah Khan.

In 2019, she debuted into web series with ALT Balaji first Bhojpuri drama Hero Vardiwala.

== Personal life ==
Seth married her longtime boyfriend Avinash Dwivedi in July 2016.

Seth runs a YouTube channel titled Sambhavna Seth Entertainment, which she manages along with her husband Avinash Dwivedi. The channel features daily life vlogs, lifestyle and travel content, as well as family-oriented videos, and frequently includes appearances by their pet dogs Coco, Cherry and Candy.

Launched on 26 July 2014, the channel has grown significantly over the years and has amassed over 3.81 million subscribers.

On 03 June 2026, Sambhavna welcomed twins (a boy & a girl) through surrogacy. Her husband supported her decision to use donor eggs via surrogacy. They both are very happy that modern science could help them by using donor eggs and taking surrogate option since they had suffered several miscarriages earlier. They encourage people having fertility issues to go via donor egg and surrogate route. In her vlogs, she has frequently spoken on her struggles to have children and have motivated several woman to never give up on the same.

== Filmography ==
=== Film ===
Year	Title	Role	Ref(s)
2001	Paagalpan	Herself	
2003	Kids no 1	Herself	
2005	Zameer	Herself	
2006	36 China Town	Simran	
2007	Undertrial	Herself	
2007	Gangotri	Herself	
2009	Kahe Gaye Pardes Piya	Riya	
2013	Rakhwala	Herself	
2014	Nagina	Herself	
2015	Welcome Back	Herself	
2015	Patna Se Pakistan	Laila	
2019	Nirahua Chalal London	Herself	
2025	Mandala Murders	Hema	

=== Television ===
Year	Title	Role	Notes	Ref(s)
2008	Bigg Boss 2	Contestant	10th place	
2008–2009	Dancing Queen	Contestant	Winner	
2009–2010	Raaz Pichhle Janam Ka	Contestant		
2010	Dil Jeetegi Desi Girl	Contestant		
2010	Bigg Boss 4	Herself		
2011	Fear Factor: Khatron Ke Khiladi 4	Contestant	13th place	
2013	Welcome – Baazi Mehmaan Nawazi Ki	Guest		
2015	Bigg Boss Halla Bol	Contestant	6th place	
2015	Razia Sultan	Shah Turkan		
2015	Farah Ki Dawat	Herself		
2016	Comedy Nights Bachao	Herself		
2016	Comedy Nights Live	Herself		
2017	BIG Memsaab	Judge		
2019	Laal Ishq	Dayan		
2019	Gudiya Hamari Sabhi Pe Bhari	Mahua		

=== Web series ===
Year	Title
2019	Hero Vardiwala

== Awards ==
Year	Award	Category	Show	Result
2007	Bhojpuri Film Awards	Best Dancer	Hanuman Bhakt Hawaldar	Won
2010	Bhojpuri Film Awards	Best Item Dance	Ranbhoomi	Won
2016	Sabrang Film Awards	Best Entertainer	—N/a	Won
2018	Sabrang Film Awards	Best item Dancer	—N/a	Won
2018	IBF Awards	Dancing Queen	—N/a	Won
