= Dil Jeetegi Desi Girl =

- Also known as: Desi Girl
- Genre: Reality
- Based on: The Simple Life by: Mary-Ellis Bunim; Jonathan Murray
- Presented by: Rohit Roy
- Judges: Sialba Majri Panchayat
- Country of origin: India
- Original language: Hindi
- No. of seasons: 1
- No. of episodes: 20

Production
- Production location: Sialba Majri
- Production company: BBC Worldwide

Original release
- Network: Imagine TV
- Release: 21 May – 4 July 2010

Dil Jeetegi Desi Girl (Desi Girl Will Win Hearts) is an Indian reality television series based on the American show The Simple Life. The first season of the series aired on Imagine TV.

== Series ==
Season	Host	Launch Date	Finale Date	Contestants	Winner	Runner-up
1	Rohit Roy	21 May 2010	4 July 2010	8	Roshni Chopra	Kashmera Shah

== Season 1 ==
Dil Jeetegi Desi Girl 1 premiered on 21 May 2010 on Imagine TV. Hosted by Rohit Roy, the season ended on 4 July 2010 with Roshni Chopra emerging as the winner.

=== Contestants ===
- Roshni Chopra | Winner
- Kashmera Shah | First Runner Up
- Ishita Arun | Second Runner Up
- Aushima Sawhney
- Monica Bedi
- Sambhavna Seth
- Anmol Singh
- Rucha Gujarathi
