= Hamar Bhauji =

Bhojpuri film (1983)

- Directed by: Kalpataru
- Produced by: Mohanji Prasad
- Starring: Tanuja; Sachin Pilgaonkar; Kunal Singh; Shreeram Lagoo
- Music by: Chitragupt
- Production company: Radhika Films
- Release date: 1983
- Country: India
- Language: Bhojpuri

Hamar Bhauji (Bhojpuri for My sister-in-law) is a 1983 Bhojpuri language social drama film produced by Mohanji Prasad under the banner of Radhika Films and directed by Kalpataru. The film stars Tanuja, Sachin Pilgaonkar, Kunal Singh and Shreeram Lagoo in the lead roles with Manmohan Krishna, and Dheeraj Kumar appearing in supporting parts. The music for the film was composed by Chitragupt. The film was based on the Hindi film Bhabhi which in turn was based on the novel Bijila by Prabhavathi Devi Saraswathi.

Hamar Bhauji was one of the notable box office successes of Bhojpuri cinema in the 1980s.

== Plot ==
A widowed businessman raises his younger brothers and son, with the assistance of his compassionate second wife (the bhouji) who manages the home and supports the brothers' education despite family tensions.

After the brothers marry, their wives create jealousy among the brothers and push for property division, leading the family to fracture: one brother moves to a village, another joins the army, and a third relocates to Bombay.

The film builds to a reunion through the bhouji's efforts amid misunderstandings and external conflicts, emphasizing family unity over everything else.

== Cast ==
- Tanuja
- Sachin Pilgaonkar
- Kunal Singh
- Shreeram Lagoo
- Manmohan Krishna
- Dheeraj Kumar
- Aruna Irani
- Shubha Khote
- Shobhana Samarth
- Jayshree T.
- Paintal
- Yunus Parvez
- Rajni Sharma

== Soundtrack ==
The film's music was composed by Chitragupt, with lyrics penned by Anjaan.

Soundtrack
No.	Song	Singers
1	Bhaiya Hamre Ram Jaisan	Suresh Wadkar, Shailendra Singh & Udit Narayan
2	Kaam Nahi Kaaj	Asha Bhosle
3	Rajai Vina Retiya	Usha Mangeshkar & Chorus
4	Ho Mori Bhouji Tohari Bahiniya	Suresh Wadkar & Alka Yagnik
5	He Ganga Maiya	Alka Yagnik
6	Aise Chale Purva	Asha Bhosle
7	Kaili Bharosa Tohar	Asha Bhosle & Suresh Wadkar
8	Tohke Dulha	Asha Bhosle & Suresh Wadkar
9	Bada Dagabaj	Udit Narayan & Alka Yagnik
