= Gangotri (2007 film) =

2007 Bhojpuri film

- Promotional poster
- Directed by: Abhishek Chhadha
- Produced by: Deepak Sawant
- Starring: Amitabh Bachchan; Hema Malini; Manoj Tiwari; Bhumika Chawla; Sambhavna Seth
- Production company: Daxina Films
- Release date: 16 November 2007
- Country: India
- Language: Bhojpuri

Gangotri is a 2007 Indian Bhojpuri-language drama film directed by Abhishek Chhadha. The film is a sequel to Ganga (2006) and stars Amitabh Bachchan, Hema Malini, Manoj Tiwari, Bhumika Chawla and Sambhavna Seth.

== Cast ==
- Amitabh Bachchan as Thakur Vijay' Thakur Kaka Singh
- Hema Malini as Thakurian Savitri V Singh
- Manoj Tiwari as Bajrangi
- Bhumika Chawla as Gangotri J Singh
- Sambhavna Seth as Singer / Dancer
- Kunal Singh as Thakur Jaswant Singh

== Production ==
The film was noted for featuring a cast from Bollywood. Although it was speculated that Nagma and Ravi Kishan (both of whom featured in Ganga)'s rumored relationship meant that Nagma was not cast, the director dismissed the rumor saying that he might show their characters being shifted to London. Mithun Chakraborty was initially cast as Bhumika Chawla's brother in the film. If Chakraborty was cast, it would mark his reunion with Bachchan since Agneepath (1990). Unlike Ganga in which Manoj Tiwari did not have a pair, he is paired opposite Bhumika Chawla in this film. This film would mark one of the last high-key Bhojpuri films to feature Amitabh Bachchan, who later acted in Ganga Devi (2012) co-starring Nirahua and Jaya Bachchan.

== Soundtrack ==
Abhishek Bachchan and Aishwarya Rai Bachchan were present at the film's audio launch.

No.	Title	Singer(s)	Length
1.	"Naee Sadak Baazaar Mein"	Sudesh Bhosle, Manoj Tiwari 'Mridul', Ashok Ghayal
2.	"Kal Kal Nadiya Bole"	Sadhana Sargam
3.	"Bandhal Rahi Dor"	Udit Narayan
4.	"Anwra Kutile Bhawra"	Alka Yagnik
5.	"Tu Zingi Ke Saans"	Udit Narayan
6.	"Dosra Khaatir No Indriba"	Kalpana Patowary
7.	"Asra Ke Diyana"	Manoj Tiwari
8.	"Sakhi Tijiya"	Alka Yagnik

== Release ==
Despite making the film in Bhojpuri, the director opted for a release of the Hindi dubbed version instead of releasing the original version.
