= Dashain Aayo =

Nepali song

Song by Udit Narayan, Deepa Jha, Narayan Lama, Juna Prasai

from the album Muglan (2005) (Original Motion Picture Soundtrack)
- Language: Nepali
- Released: 2005
- Recorded: 2005
- Length: 6:39
- Label: Music Nepal; Budha Subba Music
- Composer: Suresh Adhikari
- Lyricist: Loknath Sapkota

Muglan (2005) (Original Motion Picture Soundtrack) track listing
- 1. "Dashain Aayo"; 2. "Makhamali Pachheurile"; 3. "Paat Bajaune Mayalai"; 4. "Aaja Barha Haate Patuki"; 5. "Tinai Hun Tinai Meri Aama"

Music video
- "Dashain Aayo" on YouTube

Dashain Aayo (Nepali: दशैँ आयो), also known as Kodo Fulyo Barima, is a Nepalese song from the film Muglan, which was released in 2005. The song depicts the celebration of the biggest Hindu festival in Nepal, Dashain. It is regarded as an evergreen Dashain song, and is still prominent among Nepali people, especially during the celebration of Dashain. It was sung by Udit Narayan, Deepa Jha, Narayan Lama, and Juna Prasai. The lyrics were written by Loknath Sapkota and the music was composed by Suresh Adhikari.

The song depicts not only the festival celebration but also the joy experienced when a family member who has been working abroad for a long period of time comes back home to join in the festivities. More than 150,000 audio cassettes were sold, which was one of the highest of its time. This song is considered one of the major contributors behind the film's success.
