= Tanveer Zaidi =

Indian actor, TV presenter

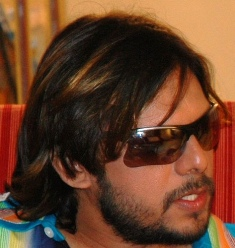
- Zaidi During an Interview
- Born: 1 December; Prayagraj Uttar Pradesh, India
- Education: St Joseph's College, Prayagraj
- Occupation: Actor Educationist
- Spouse: Ruby Zaidi
- Children: Adil Zaidi, Sania Zaidi & Daniel Zaidi
- Writing career
- Notable awards: Reliance Award in 2012 Yellow and Red Music Award in 2012 RK Excellence Award (National Award) in 2013 Inext Award in 2014 Pradesh Ratna Award in 2015

Tanveer Zaidi Urdu: تنویر زیدی, Hindi: तनवीर ज़ैदी, born to Syed Mashooq Hussain is an Indian actor and educationist. 'Tanveer Zaidi has acted in 13 films until date & many T.V series & Live shows, He has also appeared as a judge in satellite channel BIG MAGIC and worked in an International movie "The White Butterfly" – An English film for Camel Productions, Austria '

== Early life and family ==
Zaidi was born on 1 December 1975 into a Muslim family in Prayagraj to Syed Mashooq Hussain Zaidi and Qaiser Jehan. He did his schooling from St Joseph's College of Prayagraj, IERT (Institute of Engineering and Rural Technology) and University of Allahabad.

Zaidi was the eldest of seven siblings; he has two brothers, Businessman Tauseef Zaidi, the lyricist Tauqeer Zaidi, and four sisters, Heena Hasni, Mona, Farah, and Roohi Zaidi. Outside the movie industry, he is also related to the Indian Urdu poet Akbar Allahabadi through his mother. Zaidi's father, Mashooq Hussain Zaidi, was a former Govt Officer in Indian Railways.

He describes his childhood in a middle-class environment where money was always a constraint.

=== Theatrical career ===
Title	Role	Year
Adrak Ke Punjey (Babban Khan)	Child Actor	1980
Kab Door Hoga Dil Ka Tamas	Lead Actor	1980
Bakri	Lead Actor	1986
Chunnu Miyan Ki Chai	Lead Actor	1988
Merchant of Venice	Lead Actor	-
Puppet	Lead Actor	1987
Nawab Mirza Jaan	Lead Actor	1989
Ghoda Ghaas Nhi Khata	-	-

=== Film career ===
Title	Role	Year
Ishq Samandar	Actor	2016
Be-Lagaam	Pramod (Lead Actor)	2002
Ganga Kinarey	-	-
26 January Good Morning India	-	-
Murga Jhatke ka	-	-
Sajni	-	-
Kahe Gaye Pardes Piya	Lead Actor	2009
Yeh Jeevan Hai	-	2013
The Last Encounter	-	2013
The White Butterfly	-	-
Guardians: Who Loved Us	Akash (Lead Actor)	2014
Shadi Wadi	-	-
Ishq Bawandar	-	-
Subha Hone Do	-	-
Bargad Ka Ped	-	-
I Love You	-	-
Ye Jeevan Hai	-	-

=== Television career ===
Title	Role	Year
Ek Kahani	-	-
Prerna	Vijay	
Jail Mein Hai Zindagi	Aaya Ram	2006
Mano Ya Na Mano	-	-
Adalat	-	-
CID	-	-
Music Mania	-	-
Josh Malihabadi	-	-
Big Memsaab 4	Judge	-
Big Memsaab 5	Judge	-
Mele Ka Superstar 1	Judge	-
Mele Ka Superstar 2	Judge	

=== Radio career ===
Title	Channel	Year
Asli Number One	92.7 Big FM	-
Chun Mun	All-India-Radio (AIR)	-
Masiha	All-India-Radio (AIR)	-

== Writings ==
Zaidi's fictional story "Alladin and Jin" was published in the 27 October issue of Amrit Prabhat. With this, he is also the writer of many short stories like Surya Kumari, Bistar, Rehasamaye Panja, Chakra and many more. He has also contributed his poems to the newspapers like Times of India and Northern India Patrika

=== Editor ===
Zaidi has also been the editor of the magazine Film Magazine Hindi Fortnightly for seven years. He has also worked as Chief Editor of the daily newspaper 'Indian Leader'.

=== Columnist ===
Zaidi was a columnist and Opinion column writer in the Broadsheet Newspaper Dainik Jagran. And also has been writing columns in the regional newspaper Patrika.

== Business ventures ==
=== Acti Public School ===
Tanveer Zaidi is the founder and Director of Acti Public School, a school for poor children located in GTB Nagar in Allahabad. It was funded by Zaidi and his brother. Zaidi along with his father and wife who is an educationalist runs the school.

=== Acti Computers ===
Tanveer is also the director of Acti Computer College in Allahabad. The firm focuses on 'Computers and Technology literacy' for children and young adults.

== Other works ==
Zaidi once organized an award show 'Acti Prayag Award' for Awarding young athletes with guest celebrities like V.P. Singh, Devanand, and other Television Artists.

He has also organized a fashion show 'Miss Manorama Beauty Queen Contest'.

Zaidi has been successfully organizing theatre activities for aspiring actors. He has also starred in two music videos Sharmili Nazar and Ammaneh.

== Personal life ==
Zaidi is married to Ruby Zaidi, an educationist. Zaidi says they had a love marriage. This marriage blessed them with two sons Adil Zaidi and Daniyal Zaidi and also a daughter Sania Zaidi. The couple now lives in Uttar Pradesh along with their children.

Zaidi stated that none of his children have shown any intention to enter the entertainment industry yet; he stated that his elder son Adil is a computer science engineer, his younger son Danial is an executive while his daughter has chosen to pursue her career as a fashion stylist.

=== Philanthropy ===
Zaidi is very humble in his acts of community service and likes to keep it lowkey as seen in articles published in the Anurag Darshan local newspaper.

== Biography ==
Tanveer Zaidi is an actor in India. He was born on 1 December (English Calendar) or 6 June (Urdu Calendar) to Syed Mashooq Hussain in Allahabad. He did his schooling from St Joseph's College of Allahabad, IERT (Institute of Engineering and Rural Technology) and Allahabad University. He has interests in acting, journalism and writing stories. He has acted in plays, motion pictures, and telefilms. He has written columns for the newspaper, has remained editor for some publications, and is a computer professional, a model, and an educationist. Tanveer Zaidi started his acting career at a very early stage. He was a child artist in the famous play- Adrak Ke Punjey of Babban Khan. The play was a huge success and was the longest-running play in the history of the world. After getting success as a theatre actor, Tanveer Zaidi got films. The Hindi feature film Belagaam made him more popular. In Belagaam, he played the lead character Pramod. The film was a hit at the box office. DVDs/Vcds are available on Captain Videos. Tanveer Zaidi was also seen playing a lead role of a Police Inspector Ansh in a Hindi/Awadhi feature film Kahe Gaye Pardes Piya; this film also got huge success at the box office, the DVD of this movie is available in stores on Venus. Basically a computer professional, (Tanveer Zaidi is the director of acti computers and acti public school), Tanveer adores acting; he is a regular face on TV, TV serials Jail Mein Hai Zindagi, Music Mania, Jurm, Adalat, Big Memsaab 4, Big Memsaab 5, Mele Ka Big Star 1, Mele Ka Big Star 2 and Mano Na Mano are his known serials, he also modelled for the music video Sharmili Nazar and Ammaneh. Tanvir Zaidi has remained attached to radio, creative writing and modelling. His forthcoming Bollywood flicks are 26 January Good Morning India, Umasss, The Last Encounter, Ye Jeevan Hai and Shadi Wadi. In all his movies, he is playing the lead roles.

Zaidi was born on 1 December (English Calendar) or 6 June (Urdu Calendar) in Allahabad, U.P, India. He is a live entertainer also, he can be seen in many shows, and he is hosting major shows. In a recent event, Danik Jagran's Hercules Inext Bikeathon, held in Allahabad, he performed to packed audiences.

Zaidi is very humble in his acts of community service and likes to keep it lowkey as seen in articles published in the Anurag Darshan local newspaper.

Zaidi got Nift Awards for the best actor in a leading role for the Hindi/Awadhi feature film Kahe Gaye Pardes Piya in 2011; True Indian culture and family traditions in Rajshree banner type style have been depicted in this movie. He got the Reliance Award in 2012 for his immense contribution as an actor to the entertainment industry, he was also awarded by Yellow and Red Music in 2012. He was also honoured as a BEST ACTOR for his Hindi film Ye Jeevan Hai by 8th RK excellence national award 13. Apart from plays and films, Zaidi has also tried his hand in modeling assignments. He is a regular feature on T.V. Recently, he was in the news for his music album Ammaneh. and also for Dev Anand's wish of making a film with him.

Zaidi appeared in the reality show Big Memsaab, of the satellite channel BIG MAGIC; he was a judge on the show. Tanveer Zaidi also judged a show entitled Asli Number One of 92.7 BigFm, as well as Big Magic. Tanvir has also been invited to judge one of the most talked about regional talent hunt shows, Mele ka super star. The show, Mele ka Super star, gives local regional talent a platform to showcase their skills whether it is singing, dancing, stunts, mimicry, or acrobatics.

Venus has recently released the DVDs/vcds of Tanveer Zaidi's superhit Hindi/Awadhi feature film Kahe Gaye Pardes Piya. It was released in 2009 with 1173 prints, the movie was premiered at Allahabad, which is also the home town of Tanveer Zaidi. The Hindi feature film Guardians was released on 20 June 2014 all over, in which Tanveer Zaidi has played the lead role of Akash.

== Awards & honours ==
Year	Category	Movie
2011	Nift Award	Kahe Gaye Pardes Piya
2012	Reliance Award	-
2012	Yellow and Red Music Award	-
2013	R K Excellence Award (National Award)	-
2014	Intext Award	-
2015	Pradesh Ratna Award	-

== See also ==
- List of Indian Actors
- List of people from Uttar Pradesh
