= Jai Shri Swaminarayan =

Indian Television Series (2002)

This serial is a journey on the life of Swaminarayan, which includes places of worship and temples in India and around the world. The show was written and directed by Mulraj Rajda.

This initiative was started by Acharya Shree Koshalendraprasadji Maharaj of the Narnarayan Dev Gadi. The Shri Swaminarayan Mandir, Ahmedabad joined hands with Devang Patel and Devang Patel Entertainment to make this serial.

The serial has been broadcast on the SAB TV network in India and Zee TV network around the world in 2002. DVDs of this series are available on shelves.

In 2009, Ramanand Sagar's Sagar Pictures came out with another serial on Swaminarayan, titled Sarvopari Shri Swaminarayan Bhagwaan to run on Colours in India.

== Credits ==
- Mulraj Rajda played Janak Raja in the popular television serial Ramayan (TV series), on his own screenplay and dialogue, directed this serial on Swaminarayan with bhajans and kirtans.
- Devang Patel is the producer, music composer and co-director of the serial.
- Maya Govind wrote the lyrics.
- Leading singers such as Anup Jalota, Suresh Wadkar and Nitin Mukesh have sung songs for this serial.
- Vishal Pandey who hails from Kanpur played the lead role of Swaminarayan.
- Karmveer Choudhary as Father
