= Vikas Raj =

Indian film actor

Vilas Raj was an Indian actor who worked in Hindi and Marathi television and theatre. He was best known for portraying Kansa in Ramanand Sagar's Shri Krishna and Lavanasura in Uttar Ramayan. Contemporary reports also identified him as a Marathi theatre actor and noted his association with several Ramanand Sagar television productions.

== Career ==
Raj worked in Marathi theatre before entering television. According to accounts published by Indian news outlets citing information from Sagar World, producer Prem Sagar saw Raj performing in a play outside Shivaji Mandir in Dadar, Mumbai. Raj was playing the role of a truck driver in the production when Sagar noticed him and subsequently cast him in Vikram Aur Betaal.

Raj subsequently worked in several television productions associated with Ramanand Sagar. His television credits included Vikram Aur Betaal, Uttar Ramayan, Shri Krishna, Byomkesh Bakshi, Anhonee, Alif Laila and Mahabali Hanuman, according to retrospective coverage of his career.

=== Uttar Ramayan ===
Raj portrayed the demon Lavanasura in Ramanand Sagar's Uttar Ramayan, the continuation of Ramayan. Contemporary accounts noted that the role brought him considerable recognition. Actor Swwapnil Joshi later recalled an incident in which children recognized Raj as Lavanasura when he appeared at a public event.

Navbharat Times reported that although Raj appeared in only a small number of episodes as Lavanasura, the character made a strong impression on viewers. The publication also reported an incident in which a crowd gathered around him when he visited Laxmibai Chawl in Girgaon, Mumbai.

=== Shri Krishna ===
Raj portrayed Kansa in Ramanand Sagar's mythological television series Shri Krishna, which originally aired from 1993 to 1997. Cast listings for the series credit Raj as Kansa or Maharaj Kansa.

Raj's performance as Kansa became closely associated with his public identity. During the 2020 rerun of Shri Krishna on Doordarshan, several Indian publications published retrospectives about Raj and his portrayal of the character.

According to Swwapnil Joshi, who played Krishna in Shri Krishna, Raj's performance as Kansa left a lasting impression on viewers. Joshi also recalled Raj's earlier appearance as Lavanasura in Uttar Ramayan.

== Later work ==
Raj continued to appear in television and theatre productions after his work in Shri Krishna. Navbharat Times reported that his last known appearance was in the Marathi stage production Aai Shivay Ghar Nahi in 2015. The same report also listed his earlier appearances in Vikram Aur Betaal, Ramayan, Shri Krishna and Byomkesh Bakshi.

Raj is also credited in the 2004 television production Inspector Kiran.

== Death ==
Raj's death was reported in Indian media in 2020. On 2 May 2020, Navbharat Times reported that Raj had died, citing actor Swwapnil Joshi, while Aaj Tak published a similar report on 6 May.

A Jansatta report published on 3 June 2020 also discussed Raj's death and his roles as Kansa and Lavanasura.

== Filmography ==
=== Television ===
Year	Title	Role
1988–1989	Uttar Ramayan (Luv Kush)	Lavanasura
1993–1997	Shri Krishna	Kansa
1993–1997	Vikram Aur Betaal	
1993–1997	Byomkesh Bakshi	
1993–1997	Anhonee	
1993–1997	Alif Laila	
1993–1997	Mahabali Hanuman	
2004	Inspector Kiran	

== Theatre ==
Raj worked in Marathi theatre before and during his television career. Contemporary retrospective accounts describe his theatre work and his discovery by producer Prem Sagar while performing outside Shivaji Mandir in Dadar, Mumbai.
