= 21st Filmfare Awards =

1974 awards for Hindi cinema

- Date: 11 April 1974
- Site: Bombay

Highlights
- Best Film: Anuraag
- Best Actor: Rishi Kapoor for Bobby
- Best Actress: Dimple Kapadia for Bobby & Jaya Bachchan for Abhimaan
- Most awards: Bobby (5)
- Most nominations: Bobby (14)

The 21st Filmfare Awards were held on 11 April 1974.

Anuraag won Best Film, but failed to win any other awards, a feat which was repeated by a few films in the 1970s.

Bobby led the ceremony with 14 nominations, followed by Zanjeer with 9 nominations and Daag: A Poem of Love with 7 nominations.

Bobby won 5 awards, including Best Actor (for Rishi Kapoor), Best Actress (for Dimple Kapadia) and Best Male Playback Singer (Narendra Chanchal for "Beshak Mandir Masjid"), thus becoming the most-awarded film at the ceremony.

For the first time in the history of the Filmfare Awards, there was a tie for an acting award, when Dimple Kapadia and Jaya Bachchan tied for Best Actress for their performances in Bobby and Abhimaan respectively.

Gulzar received dual nominations for Best Director for his direction in Achanak and Koshish, but lost to Yash Chopra who won the award for Daag: A Poem of Love.

Nutan received dual nominations for Best Supporting Actress for her performances in Anuraag and Saudagar, in addition to a Best Actress nomination for Saudagar, but lost the former to Raakhee who won the award for Daag: A Poem of Love, and the latter to Dimple Kapadia and Jaya Bachchan for Bobby and Abhimaan respectively.

== Main awards ==
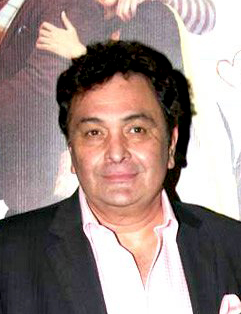
Rishi Kapoor — Best Actor winner for Bobby

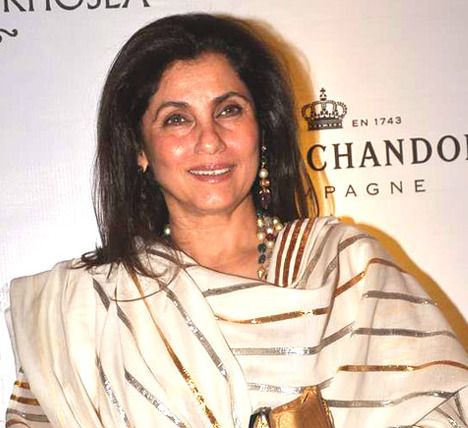
Dimple Kapadia — Best Actress co-winner for Bobby

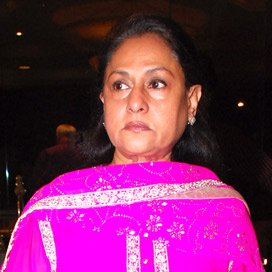
Jaya Bachchan — Best Actress co-winner for Abhimaan

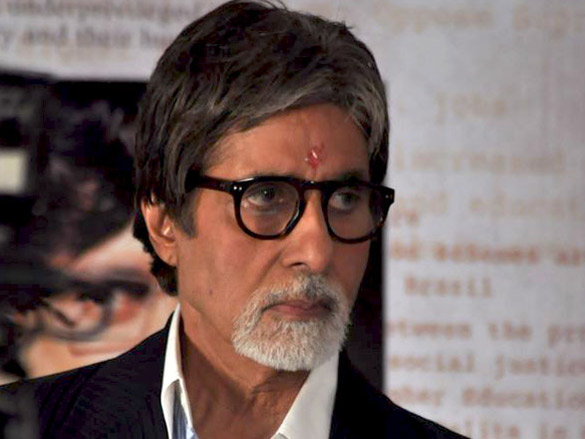
Amitabh Bachchan — Best Supporting Actor winner for Namak Haraam

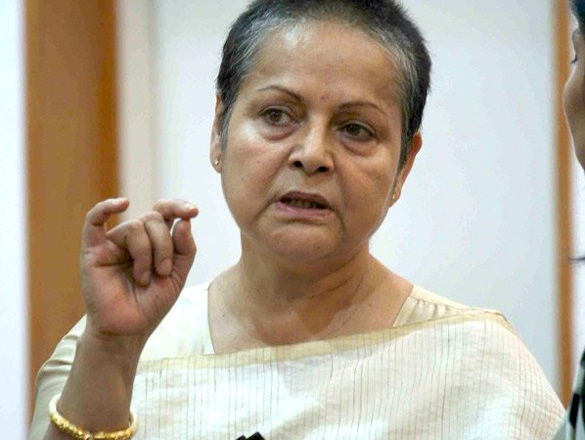
Rakhee — Best Supporting Actress winner for Daag

=== Best Film ===
Anuraag

- Aaj Ki Taaza Khabar
- Bobby
- Daag: A Poem of Love
- Koshish
- Zanjeer

=== Best Director ===
Yash Chopra – Daag: A Poem of Love

- Gulzar – Achanak
- Gulzar – Koshish
- Raj Kapoor – Bobby
- Rajendra Bhatia – Aaj Ki Taaza Khabar

=== Best Actor ===
Rishi Kapoor – Bobby

- Amitabh Bachchan – Zanjeer
- Dharmendra – Yaadon Ki Baarat
- Rajesh Khanna – Daag: A Poem of Love
- Sanjeev Kumar – Koshish

=== Best Actress ===
Dimple Kapadia – Bobby and Jaya Bachchan – Abhimaan (tie)

- Jaya Bachchan – Koshish
- Moushumi Chatterjee – Anuraag
- Nutan – Saudagar
- Sharmila Tagore – Daag: A Poem of Love

=== Best Supporting Actor ===
Amitabh Bachchan – Namak Haraam

- Ashok Kumar – Victoria No. 203
- Asrani – Abhimaan
- Pran – Zanjeer
- Premnath – Bobby

=== Best Supporting Actress ===
Raakhee – Daag: A Poem of Love

- Aruna Irani – Bobby
- Bindu – Abhimaan
- Nutan – Anuraag
- Nutan – Saudagar

=== Best Comic Actor ===
Asrani – Aaj Ki Taaza Khabar

- Asrani – Namak Haraam
- I. S. Johar – Aaj Ki Taaza Khabar
- Mehmood – Do Phool
- Pran – Victoria No. 203

=== Best Story ===
Zanjeer – Salim–Javed

- Aaj Ki Taaza Khabar – Mulraj Rajda
- Achanak – K.A. Abbas
- Anuraag – Shakti Samanta
- Koshish – Gulzar

=== Best Screenplay ===
Zanjeer – Salim–Javed

=== Best Dialogue ===
Namak Haraam – Gulzar

=== Best Music Director ===
Abhimaan – S. D. Burman

- Bobby – Laxmikant–Pyarelal
- Daag: A Poem of Love – Laxmikant–Pyarelal
- Yaadon Ki Baarat – R. D. Burman
- Zanjeer – Kalyanji–Anandji

=== Best Lyricist ===
Zanjeer – Gulshan Bawra for Yaari Hai Imaan Mera

- Bobby – Anand Bakshi for Hum Tum Ek Kamre Main
- Bobby – Anand Bakshi for Main Shayar To Nahin
- Bobby – Vithalbhai Patel for Jhoot Bole Kava Kaate
- Samjhauta – Indeevar for Samjhauta Gamose Karlo

=== Best Playback Singer, Male ===
Bobby – Narendra Chanchal for Beshak Mandir Masjid

- Bobby – Shailendra Singh for Main Shayar To Nahin
- Daag: A Poem of Love – Kishore Kumar for Mere Dil Main Aaj
- Naina – Mohammad Rafi for Hum Ko Jaan Se Pyaari
- Zanjeer – Manna Dey for Yaari Hai Imaan Mera

=== Best Playback Singer, Female ===
Naina – Asha Bhosle for Hone Lagi Hai Raat Jawaan

- Aa Gale Lag Ja – Sushma Shrestha for Tera Mujhse Hai
- Anhonee – Asha Bhosle for Hungama Ho Gaya
- Prem Parbat – Minoo Purshottam for Raat Piya Ke Sang
- Raja Rani – Asha Bhosle for Jab Andhera Hota Hai

=== Best Art Direction ===
Bobby

=== Best Cinematography ===
Jheel Ke Us Paar

=== Best Editing ===
Zanjeer

=== Best Sound ===
Bobby

== Critics' awards ==
=== Best Film ===
Duvidha

=== Best Documentary ===
A Day With the Builders

== Biggest winners ==
- Bobby – 5/14
- Zanjeer – 4/9
- Daag: A Poem of Love – 2/7
- Abhimaan – 2/4
- Namak Haraam – 2/3

== See also ==
- 23rd Filmfare Awards
- 22nd Filmfare Awards
- Filmfare Awards
