= Arun Govil =

Indian actor and politician (born 1958)

Hon'ble Arun Govil
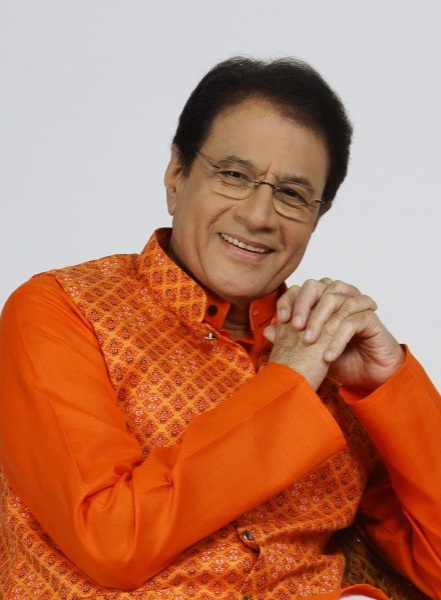
- Formal portrait, 2024

Member of Parliament, Lok Sabha
- Incumbent
- Assumed office 4 June 2024
- Preceded by: Rajendra Agrawal
- Constituency: Meerut, Uttar Pradesh

Personal details
- Born: 12 January 1958 (age 68) Meerut, Uttar Pradesh, India
- Party: Bharatiya Janata Party
- Spouse: Shrilekha Govil (m. 1979)
- Relations: Tabassum (sister-in-law)
- Children: 2
- Education: Dr. Bhimrao Ambedkar University
- Occupation: Actor; politician

Arun Govil (/ɑːˈruːn ˈɡoʊvɪl/ GOH-vil; Hindi: [əɾʊɳ goːʋɪl]; born 12 January 1958) is an Indian actor and politician from the Bharatiya Janata Party. He is best known for portraying Lord Rama in the 1987 Ramayan TV series and reprising his role (voice acting) in the 1993 animated film, Ramayana: The Legend of Prince Rama. He also appeared in films like Paheli (1977), Sawan Ko Aane Do (1979), Saanch Ko Aanch Nahin (1979), Jiyo To Aise Jiyo (1981), Himmatwala (1983), Dilwaala (1986), and Govinda Govinda (1994). He is currently serving as a Member of Parliament, Lok Sabha to Meerut Lok Sabha constituency from June 2024.

== Early life ==
Arun Govil was born on 12 January 1958, in Meerut, Uttar Pradesh. He spent his teenage life in Shahjahanpur, Uttar Pradesh. He got his formal education at an affiliated college of Agra University situated in Shahjahanpur, where he studied science (BSc degree). His father wanted him to become a government servant while Arun wanted to do something for which he would be remembered.

Arun's father, Chandraprakash Govil, was a government officer. Arun is the fourth of six brothers and two sisters. His elder brother Vijay Govil was married to Tabassum, a former child actress and the host of the first Bollywood celebrity talk show on Doordarshan Phool Khile Hain Gulshan Gulshan, which continued for 21 years.

== Career ==
In 1975, he moved to Mumbai to join his brother's business there. After a short while, he found that he no longer enjoyed the work and decided to find something more enjoyable. After doing dramas in college he decided to start acting. Govil got his first break in Indian cinema in the 1977 film Prashanta Nanda's Paheli, when he was introduced to Tarachand Barjatya by his sister-in-law Tabassum. Tarachand Barjatya, impressed by Govil's performance in the film, signed him a three-film-deal, for Kanak Mishra's Sawan Ko Aane Do (1979), Vijay Kapoor’s Raadha Aur Seeta (1979) and Satyen Bose's Saanch Ko Aanch Nahin (1979), which shot Govil to stardom. Sawan Ko Aane Do and Saanch Ko Aanch Nahin became major successes at the box office. He made his small screen debut in Ramanand Sagar's Vikram Aur Betaal (1985). He was then cast as Bhagwan Rama in Sagar's TV series Ramayan (1986), for which he won the Uptron Award in the Best Actor in a Leading Role category in 1988. He reprised his role as Rama in Sagar's Luv Kush and Padmalya Telefilms Limited's Jai Veer Hanuman. He featured in Kanak Mishra's Jiyo To Aise Jiyo (1981).

His role as Rama provided him great exposure and led him to be cast in other roles such as Harishchandra in the TV series Vishwamitra and Buddha in the TV series Buddha. He lent his voice as Rama in Yugo Sako's Indo-Japanese animation film Ramayana: The Legend of Prince Rama (1992). He also played the role of Laxman in V. Madhusudhana Rao's Lav Kush (1997). In the year 2020, he appeared on The Kapil Sharma Show as a guest along with Dipika Chikhlia, Sunil Lahri and Prem Sagar to promote the book An Epic Life - Ramanand Sagar: From Barsaat to Ramayan, a biography of the late Ramanand Sagar.

== Personal life ==
Govil is married to actress Shrilekha. They have two children together, Sonika and Amal. Their daughter in law's name is Divya.

== Political career ==
On 18 March 2021, Arun Govil joined the Bhartiya Janata Party.

He was nominated as the Bharatiya Janata Party candidate for Meerut Lok Sabha constituency from Uttar Pradesh on 25 March 2024, to contest the upcoming 2024 Lok Sabha polls. On 4 June 2024, he was elected to the Lok Sabha, representing Meerut Lok Sabha constituency. In the 2024 Lok Sabha election, he won the Meerut seat by a margin of 10,585 votes, securing 5,46,469 votes against Samajwadi Party candidate Sunita Verma who got 5,35,884 votes.

== Filmography ==
=== Film ===
Year	Film	Character	Notes
1977	Paheli	Balram	
1979	Sawan Ko Aane Do	Brij Mohan/Birju	
1979	Saanch Ko Aanch Nahin	Ajay S. Agarwal	
1979	Raadha Aur Seeta	Shekhar Verma	
1980	Judaai	Umakant S. Verma	
1980	Ganga Dham	Mohan	
1981	Jiyo To Aise Jiyo	Kundan Sharma	
1981	Itni Si Baat	Anand	
1981	Shradhanjali	Raju Kumar	
1981	Commander	Rakesh Kumar	
1982	Gumsum	Shankar	
1982	Ayaash	Amal	
1982	Sasural	Narendra	
1982	Jawalaa Dahej Ki		
1983	Kalka	Shibu	
1983	Lal Chunariya		
1983	Himmatwala	Govind	
1983	Justice Chaudhury	Inspector Ramesh Chaudhary	
1984	Aasmaan	Doctor	
1984	Kanoon Meri Mutthi Mein		
1984	Ram Tera Desh	Prakash	
1985	Karm Yudh	Rajesh	
1985	Do Dilon Ki Dastaan	Kamal	
1985	Yudh	Inspector Bhargav	
1985	Baadal	Thakur Kiran Singh	
1985	Lallu Ram	Shankar/Raju	
1986	Devar Bhabi		
1986	Dilwaala	Mohan Kumar	
1986	Shatru	Salim	
1986	Nafrat	Vijay	
1987	Maashuka	Arun Verma	
1989	Bidhir Bidhan		Odia film
1989	Pyari Dulhaniya		Bhojpuri film
1991	Edu Kondalaswamy	Lord Venkateswara	Telugu film
1992	Ramayana: The Legend of Prince Rama	Bhagwan Rama	voice only
1992	Shiv Mahima	Bhagwan Shiva	
1993	Muqabla	Havaldar Satyaprakash	
1994	Govinda Govinda	Lord Venkateswara	Telugu film
1994	Kanoon	Pankaj	
1995	Shanivrat Mahima	Bhagwan Indra/ Lord Venkestwara	
1995	Hathkadi	Arun Chauhan	
1995	Buk Bhara Bhalobasha	Soumitra Dutt	Bengali film
1996	Great Robbery	Lord Venkateswara	Telugu film
1997	Dhaal	Inspector Deodhar	
1997	Do Ankhen Barah Hath		
1997	Lav Kush	Laxmana	
1997	Gaon Desh	Bade Chaudhary	Bhojpuri Film
1999	Upendra	Raja Vikramaditya	Kannada Film
2006	Babul Pyaare	Pandit Hari Singh	Bhojpuri Film
2007	Kanhaiyo		Rajasthani Film
2023	Sergeant	Nikhil's Father	Released on JioCinema
2023	OMG 2	Principal Atal Nath Maheshwari	
2023	Hukus Bukus	Pandit Radheshayam	
2024	695		
2024	Article 370	Prime Minister	
2025	Sant Tukaram		
2026	Ramayana: Part 1	Dasharatha	
2026	Veer Murarbaji †	Shahaji	Marathi-Hindi bilingual film; completed

=== Television ===
Year	Title	Role	Notes
1985	Vikram Aur Betaal	King Vikramāditya	
1987-1988	Ramayan	Bhagwan Rama	
1989	Luv Kush	Bhagwan Rama	
1989	Vishwamitra	Raja Harishchandra	
1992	Phoolwanti	Pandit Vankatesh Shastri	
1994-95	Mashaal	Ajay	
1995	Jai Veer Hanuman	Ram	
1996- 1997	Buddha	Buddha	
1998-1999	Ashiqui	Sushil	
1999-2000	Pal Chhin	Pratap Singh	
2000-2001	Basera		
2001	Kaise Kahoon	Zaheer Ahmed	
2002	Saanjhi	Amar	
2003	Ehsaas - Kahani Ek Ghar Ki		
2003	Gayatri Mahima	Rishi Chavan	
2006	Woh Hue Na Hamare	Ravinder Damania	
2013	Etv's Sri Bhagavatam	Sri Maha Vishnu	Telugu Mythological serial
2023	Jubilee	Narain Khanna	Amazon Prime Video series

== See also ==
- List of Indian television actors
- List of Hindi television actresses
- List of Indian television actresses
