= Vishwamitra (TV series) =

- Created by: Yamini Saraswati
- Written by: Kamalakara Kameswara Rao; Dialogue: Rahi Masoom Raza
- Directed by: Dasari Narayana Rao
- Starring: See below
- Original language: Hindi
- No. of seasons: 1
- No. of episodes: 27

Production
- Producer: Dasari Narayana Rao
- Production company: K. R. Films

Original release
- Network: DD National
- Release: 1989

Vishwamitra is an Indian television series, which aired in 1989. It was produced and directed by Dasari Narayana Rao. The dialogue for the show were written by Urdu poet Rahi Masoom Raza who previously wrote dialogues for Mahabharat.

The show orignallay aired on DD National.

== Plot ==
The story of show follows the character of Kshatriya King Vishwarath becoming a Brahmarishi Vishwamitra the sage after a feud with Sage Vashishtha over the divine cow Nandini.

== Cast ==
Actor	Character
Mukesh Khanna	Vishwamitra / Vishwarath
Arun Govil	Raja Harishchandra
Arvind Trivedi	Sathyavrata (Trishanku)
Mulraj Rajda	Vashishtha
Bhanupriya	Menaka
Virendra Razdan	Rishi Kanva
Shantipriya	Shakuntala
Sudhakar	Dushyanta
Mohan Choti	Nakshatrik
Rupini	

== Episodes ==
No.	Notes
1	Vishwarath is anointed as the new King by his father King Gaadhi.
2	He reaches Vashishtha's ashram with his army after a war. After getting exceptional hospitality in the ashram, he learns of the divine cow Nandini. When a famine strikes his kingdom he asks his counsel to get Nandini cow from Vashishtha, which the latter refuses.
3	Angry King Vishwarath reaches the ashram and tries to obtain the cow forcefully but fails. The humiliated king decides to gain divine power by doing tapasya and abdicates the throne for his son.
4	Vishwarath gets the boon of various divine weapons from Lord Brahma. He again reaches Vashishtha's ashram to capture Nandini but fails. He vows to gain more power by doing great penance to become a Brahmarishi.
5	Ayodhya King Sathyavrata anoints his son Harishchandra as the new King and decides to ascend heaven with his mortal body. However, his unnatural wish gets refuted by Vashishtha. He tries to lure Vashishtha's son Satya to help him achieve his desires. An angry Satya curses Sathyavrata and makes him Trishanku.
6	Vishwarath after severe penance and tapasya gains more powers and blessing of Mother Gayatri, Vishwarath the warrior becomes Vishwamitra the sage.
7	A dejected Trishanku approaches Vishwamitra to achieve his desires. After knowing that Vashishtha refused his wishes, Vishwamitra promises him the impossible. But his yajna is rejected by Indra and other gods.
8	Vishwamitra begins creating alternate heaven for Trishanku when gods dismiss him from Indra's heaven.
9	Bṛhaspati (along with Narada ) tries to persuade Vishwamitra to abandon creation of new heaven for Trishanku which he agrees. However, Narada later instigates him reminding him of the promise he makes to Trishanku. Vishwamitra begins more penance to gain uninterrupted access to heaven. Knowing this Indra and other gods (on the advice of Brhaspati) decide to disrupt his tapasya. They create a celestial Mahashakti after uniting their powers. But they fail and Vishwamitra kills the celestial Mahashakti with his divine powers.
10	Indra decides to disrupt Vishwamitra's penance by sending apsara Rambha to seduce him. But an angry Vishwamitra curses her and turns her into a rock. She regrets her actions and asks for forgiveness. He gives her the boon that in future she will be liberated by a Maharishi. After failing repeatedly, Indra decides to disrupt his tapasya himself and goes to Vishwamitra disguising as a hungry Brahmin. But Vishwamitra recognises him easily and still gives his divine food gained from penance. He embarrasses Indra for his malevolent deeds. A dejected and humiliated Indra leaves for heaven.
11	Upon advice of Brhaspati, Indra summons apsara Meneka to seduce and deviate Vishwamitra from his penance. A reluctant Menaka agrees for the task. She decides to take help from Rati and Kamadev.
12	After severe attempts Menaka successfully gains the attention of Vishwamitra and makes him fall in love with her.
13	Both of them get married and thus Indra gets his task finally fulfilled. He then asks Menaka to return to heaven but Menaka refuses as she's in love with Vishwamitra too. Indra orders her to return as it'll be unnatural for a celestial being to spend time on earth. A year later Menaka gives birth to a daughter. Narada reminds Indra that Menaka hasn't returned to heaven.
14	Menaka finally confesses to Vishwamitra that she was sent on a mission by Indra and now as her task is complete she has to return. An angry and disheartened Vishwamitra abandons Menaka and daughter and sets out to fulfill his vow to become a Maharishi. Menaka also ascends to heaven leaving their daughter behind. Rishi Kanva and his wife Gautami find the girl in the forest and adopt her. As a baby, she is surrounded by Shakunta birds (Sanskrit: शकुन्त, śakunta). Therefore, he named her Shakuntala (Sanskrit: शकुन्तला), meaning Shakunta-protected.
15	King Dushyanta arrives in Rishi Kanva's ashram and falls in love with Shakuntala.
16	Shakuntala and Dushyant's love blossoms.
17	Dushyant proposes Shakuntala for marriage and they have a gandharva marriage. Having to leave after some time, Dushyant gives Shakuntala a royal ring as a sign of their love, promising her that he will return for her. One day, sage Durvasa visits the hermitage, but Shakuntala, who is too absorbed in her thoughts of Dushyant, forgets to serve him food. In a fit of anger, sage Durvasa curses her, saying that the person she is thinking of will forget her.
18	Shocked friends of Shakuntala beg for forgiveness and the sage, after regaining his composure, assures them that the person will remember her again when she shows some proof of their acquaintance. Her friends decide not to tell her anything about the curse. Shakuntala gets pregnant and Rishi Kanva decides to send her to Dushyanta.
19	So, Shakuntala sets off to the capital, Hastinapur, to remind Dushyant of their past love. Owing to the curse, Dushyanta does not recollect Shakuntala and asks for evidence but an accident occurs in which a fish consumes the royal ring, leaving Shakuntala with no concrete evidence. A disheartened Shakuntala leaves Hastinapur. Her mother Menaka helps her and takes her Maharishi Kashyapa ashram so that she can give birth to the child. A fisherman brings the lost ring back to the King and his memory and love are rekindled.
20	Meanwhile, Shakuntala gives birth to Bharata. One day King Dushyanta while hunting meets Bharata & Shakuntala, and the couple is finally reunited. A meeting is called in heaven by Indra with combined participation of representatives of earth and heaven. All Brahmarishis are invited and Vashishtha urges Indra to call Maharishi Vishwamitra too as he'll be soon a Brahamrishi. Narada is asked to invite Vishwamitra which he accepts. During the meeting, a discussion arises about the most valuable matter in the universe. Vashishtha concludes that there is nothing more precious than truth. He also named Raja Harishchandra as the king who follows the difficult path of truth. His claim is challenged by Vishwamitra and he proposes to test Harishchandra's integrity.
21	To assess Harishchandra's commitment towards truthfulness, Vishwamitra reaches his court and asks for an unusually huge amount of treasure for organising a yajna which the King readily accepts. Even upon insistence from the King and his counsel, Vishwamitra refuses to take the treasure at once and asks the king to set aside the treasure with himself and he will take it when the right time arrives. Later, Viswamitra creates and send wild animals to Harishchandra's kingdom to further test his mettle. Harishchandra saves his subjects from wild animals.
22	Using his powers, Vishwamitra creates two Matangi girls and send them to seduce Raja Harishchandra. The girls are not able to seduce Harishchandra. He is rather disgusted with their seductive performance and asked them to leave with some rewards. But the girls refuse to take any reward and in turn ask the King to marry them. Harishchandra refuses to marry them as he is already married to Taramati. The girls then offer themselves as concubines which he vehemently refuses. Later a furious Vishwamitra arrives in Harishchandra's court over the rejection of his magical daughters. Even after the strong insistence of Vishwamitra, Harishchandra refuses to marry his daughters and decides to relinquish his kingdom for saving dharma. He hands over his entire kingdom to Vishwamitra but when he prepares to leaves for Kashi with his wife and son, Vishwamitra asks for the money promised to him for yajna purpose. Harishchandra asks for a month's time to fulfill the promise. Vishwamitra sends his disciple Nakshatrik to accompany them.
23	On his journey to Kashi, Vishwamitra creates many hurdles to deviate Harishchandra from dharma. He creates Mayamuni to misguide Harishchandra from the path of righteousness. Vishwamitra's disciple Nakshatrik also keeps giving a hard time to Harishchandra throughout his journey. Vishwamitra creates a Betaal to scare Harishchandra and his family at night but Harishchandra kills him in a duel. Finally, they reach Kashi and Nakshatrik asks for the promised money. Unable to pay anything, Harishchandra asks for some time but Nakshatrik gives him the choice to back-out from his words as there is no way he can deliver his commitment. Taramati asks his husband to sell her off as a slave so that he can pay the money to Vishwamitra. A reluctant Harishchandra agrees for it.
24	A rich Brahmin named Kaalkaushik buys Taramati & her son (named Rohita) and give the asked money to Nakshatrik. But Vishwamitra refuses the money and gives it to Nakshatrik for his services. Vishwamitra asks his disciple to rigorously test Harishchandra's commitment to dharma. Nakshatrik approaches Harishchandra and asks for his guru's debt. A shocked Harishchandra decides this time to sell himself.
25	A rich drunkard chandala named Veerbahu buys Harishchandra and renames him Veerdas. He deploys him as dom (untouchable) to perform last rites rituals at Ganga Ghat. Veerbahu instructs him to charge a gold coin, a new cloth, and rice for anyone coming for the last rites ritual. While Harishchandra is busy working as a dom, his wife and son face a lot of hardship at their master's place because of his cruel wife.
26	Taramati's master sends Rohita to the forest along with others for daily chores. Vishwamitra sends Nagraj as a snake to kill Rohita. He dies in the forest due to snake-bite and his corpse is later discovered by Taramati. Heart-broken Taramati takes the corpse of his son for cremation where she's stopped by none other than his own husband Harishchandra. They are not able to recognise each other initially. As per his master's instruction, he can't let anyone do the last rites without the pre-requisite items. Taramati identifies his husband. A mournful Harishchandra still sticks to his dharma and tells his wife to get the items for cremation. Taramati asks her husband to guard their son's corpse while she leaves to get the items from her master.
27	Vishwamitra creates a creature to kill a young prince and sets-up Taramati to find the dead prince on her way to her master. The King orders to execute Taramati and she's taken to Veerbahu for execution. Veerbahu orders Veerdas to follow orders and behead Taramati as per the King's justice. Following his dharma, Harishchandra is about to behead his wife when Vishwamitra appears and stops him. Vishwamitra offers his entire kingdom back provided he agrees to marry his Matangi daughters. Harishchandra refuses again and following his master's order swings the sword to behead Taramati but the sword turns into a garland. Vishwamitra then concedes his plans to Harishchandra. He reveals that Taramati's master Kaalkaushik and his wife are Shiva-Parvati themselves. Veerbahu is none other than Yamaraj. Vashishtha also appears and appreciates Harishchandra's commitment towards his dharma. Vishwamitra discloses that he was testing Harishchandra's integrity to send a message to the gods who claim to be superior than human beings. His grand-plan was to prove that humankind is far superior than even gods and Harishchandra had proved it. Vishwamitra blesses Harishchandra with his previous glory, his half tapasya strength and brings Rohita back to life.

== Music ==
Lyrics for various songs were written by Bhring Tupkari and music was composed by Vasu Rao. The title song was performed by Yesudas.
