= Vikram Aur Betaal =

Indian television series

- Genre: Fantasy; Mythology
- Created by: Sagar Arts Limited
- Based on: Baital Pachisi
- Starring: Arun Govil; Sajjan
- Country of origin: India
- Original language: Hindi
- No. of seasons: 1
- No. of episodes: 26

Production
- Producer: Ramanand Sagar
- Camera setup: Multi-camera
- Running time: approximately 22 minutes

Original release
- Network: DD National
- Release: 13 October 1985 – 6 April 1986

Vikram Aur Betaal (transl. Vikram and vampire) is an Indian television series that aired on DD National in 1985 and was re-telecast in 1988 after the hit series Ramayan. The series contained stories from Indian mythology. The concept of the program was based on Baital Pachisi, a collection of tales and legends within a frame story from India (a collection of 25 tales that are narrated by Vetala to Vikram). It is also known as Vikram-Betaal. It is about the legendary king Vikram (identified as Vikramāditya) and the ghost Betal (identified as Vetala, a spirit analogous to a vampire in Western literature). The show aired at 4:30 PM Indian Standard Time on Sundays from 1985 to 1986.

== Legend ==
Vikram Aur Betaal draws its inspiration from 'Betaal Pachisi,' which is a collection of tales penned by the 11th-century Kashmiri poet Somdev Bhatta. The tales unfold as the ghost Betaal shares his narratives with the King Vikramaditya. .

The legend states that Vikramaditya, a ruler governing a kingdom from his capital in Ujjain, was known for his passion for knowledge and adventure. Fearless and resolute, the king welcomed daily visitors who bestowed him with various gifts, all of which he graciously accepted. Among these guests was a mendicant who, on each visit, presented the king with fruit. Vikramaditya, in turn, entrusted these gifts to the royal storekeeper. One fateful day, as the king handled the fruit, a surprising discovery unfolded—a ruby concealed within. Intrigued, Vikramaditya ordered an inspection of all the fruits, revealing a cache of fine rubies. Determined to understand the mystery, the king sought out the mendicant, who set a peculiar condition for their meeting under a banyan tree in the heart of the cremation ground, at night, on the 14th day of the dark half of the month. Abiding by the arrangement, the king met the mendicant, who revealed a task only a ruler like Vikramaditya could undertake. He instructed the king to retrieve a centuries-old corpse hanging from a tree's branch at the northernmost corner of the ground. The mendicant sought occult powers through specific rites performed on this particular corpse.

Legend further has it that Vikramaditya, driven by a vow, had to transport Betaal's corpse silently from one location to another. During this journey, Betaal's spirit within the corpse narrated stories, concluding each with a question. The king, bound by the vow, had to respond; failure to do so risked dire consequences. Yet, each time Vikramaditya answered, Betaal returned to the treetop, leaving the king short of his destination. Undeterred, Vikramaditya persisted, completing all 25 stories as dictated by 'Betaal Pachisi.' However, Betaal eventually disclosed the mendicant's sinister motive. Intent on acquiring world powers, the mendicant planned to kill the king during the occult rites on Betaal's corpse. Suspicion arose in Vikramaditya's mind, but he proceeded to meet the mendicant, anticipating a surprise. True to Betaal's revelation, the mendicant attempted to kill Vikramaditya, who, displaying cunning prowess, outsmarted and defeated his assailant, exposing the nefarious plan.

Thus, the tales of Vikram Aur Betaal unfold, weaving together elements of suspense, wisdom, and the triumph of virtue over treachery.

== Cast ==
=== Main ===
- Arun Govil - as Vikram or King Vikramāditya
- Sajjan - as Betaal or Vetala (ghost).

=== Episodic ===
- Arvind Trivedi - as the mendicant.
- Deepika Chikhalia - in many roles.
- Vijay Arora - in many roles.
- Ramesh Bhatkar - in many roles.
- Mulraj Rajda - in many roles.
- Rajnibala - in many roles.
- Sunil Lahiri - in many roles.
- Lilliput - in many roles.
- Rama Vij - in many roles.
- Satish Kaul - in many roles.
- Surjeet Mohanty - in many roles.
- Sameer Rajda - in many roles.
- Vijay Kavish - as Chamatkari Yogi (S1 E22), Divya Atma (S1E21), Prabandhak (S1E10), Rupsen (S1E2), The Magician's Son (S1E15), The Weaver (S1E11)

== List of episodes ==
#	Title	Other Cast
1	"King Vikramaditya and the Yogi / Suryamal and His Bride's Dilemma"	Balwant Bansal as Mantri; Ramesh Bhatkar as the bride's father Gagan Gupta as soldier Satish Kaul as Suryamal
Short Summary: The first episode is about how Raja Vikramaditya and Betaal meet. Betaal tells him a story of Suryamal, who falls in love with a woman and marries her with her parents' consent. En route to home, dacoits attack and behead Suryamal and his friend. Suryamal's bride, a devout worshipper of the goddess Durga, tries to commit suicide after seeing her husband dead. Goddess answers her prayers and decides to bring them both alive. Excited with joy, the bride puts Suryamal's head on his friend's body and vice versa. Question: Betaal asks, who should the bride now consider as her husband; the man who has Suryamal's head or Suryamal's body? Answer: Vikram answers, as the brain controls the whole man, the man with Suryamal's head is the bride's husband.
2	"King Rupsen and His Bodyguard Virvar"	Dara Singh as Virvar; Madhu Kapoor as Raj Laxmi
Short Summary: Virvar with his mighty physical strength gains the position of being bodyguard to King Rupsen. But he charges him a hefty sum of 9 tolas of gold daily. One day the goddess of wealth (Raj Laxmi) tells Virvar that a demon who sleeps in a cave will soon wake up and eat the king to satisfy his hunger. Being king's bodyguard, Virvar along with his family decides to sacrifice their lives and hence enter the cave. After knowing what Virvar did to save his life, King Rupsen feels ashamed of not doing his duty of protecting his masses and he too enters the cave. The goddess of wealth comes and tells them all of how it was all her plan to test Virvar if he really was loyal as he charged a huge amount. Question: Betaal asks Vikram - Between King Rupsen and Virvar whose sacrifice is greater? Answer: Vikram answers - It was Virvar's duty to protect the king and he did duty by protecting King Rupsen, whereas King Rupsen had no such obligation towards Virvar. Hence King Rupsen's sacrifice was greater.
3	"Love Story of King Yashodhan"	Vijay Arora as Yashodhan; Rajni Bala as Girl's mother Ramesh Bhatkar as Girl's father Mohan Choti as Darbari; Satish Kaul as Senapati; Kaajal Kiran as Rich man's daughter Chandrakant Pandya as Darbari; Mulraj Rajda as Kausal Sen
Short Summary: King Yashodhan is a just and kind king of his kingdom. He is well trusted by his army, commanders, and courtiers. But, Yashodhan is also well-skilled in punishing the culprits. He does so by punishing a businessman who had brought the nautch girls for his luxury. In his kingdom, there lived a rich couple who plans to marry their beautiful and able daughter off to the king. They send an invitation to the King, in return the king sends his darbaris to inspect the girl whether she is qualified enough to be the Queen. The Darbaris does so and think positively about her. But on their return way to the palace, the evil businessman convinced the Darbaris that the girl can't be queen as if the girl is beautiful then the king will not pay attention to his duties. So, the Darbaris lies to the king about the girl. As a result, the king brokes the proposal of marriage with the girl. After some time, the same rich man arranges his daughter marriage with the King's Commander. He engages his daughter with the commander and they fall in love with each other. One day, the girl's beauty caught the king's eye. He sends his ministers and commander to search the girl and ask her hand for the king. This puts a dilemma situation to the commander as his loyalty to the king is tested. As a result, he broke off with the girl and sacrifices her, and tells the king that she is ready for marriage with the king. On the wedding day, the darbaris advise the king to reward the commander after being asked why so, the darbaris put the whole truth to the king. As the king was just he arranges the marriage of the commander and the very girl. Thus, sacrificing her. Question: Whose sacrifice is bigger and greater the king's or the commander's? Answer: The commander's sacrifice is bigger and greater as he sacrificed his love and fiancée for sake of loyalty and kingdom whereas the king sacrifices only a girl he wished to marry by simply catching her glimpse.
4	"Three Suitors and Somprabha"	Vijay Arora as Anuragi; Ramesh Bhatkar as Somprabha's Father; Satish Kaul as Shilpi; Kaajal Kiran as Somprabha; Sunil Lahri as Vir Singh; Mulraj Rajda as the Giant; Dharmesh Tiwari as Somprabha's Brother
Short Summary: Somprabha is a beautiful and multi-talented girl ready age to get married. Her father, mother, and brother were happy for her and wanted to get her married. But, a giant demon has also vowed and promised them that he will take her away. This tensed the whole family. After some days, Somprabha's Father was travelling when group of bandits attacked his group then, a handsome and brave warrior, Vir Singh saved them with his weaponry and physical strength. Father gets impressed and offers him to marry his daughter which he accepts. Somprabha's mother also meets a poet who had written about her charm, the mother also offers him the same and he also accepted. At the same time, brother also offers the same to an engineer who had built a Viman, who also accepts. At the time of the official matchmaking ceremony, all three suitors arrive and the bride is given the choice of choosing her betrothed. Alas, the giant demon arrives and abducts Somprabha, much to the dismay of her family and three suitors. The suitors then decide to go after the demon, as the poet knows the place where the demon lives. Using the engineer's Viman, all three arrive at the demon's place and the warrior manages to defeat the demon. With Somprabha in tow, all of them go back safely to her home. Somprabha now faces a dilemma on whom to pick as her husband. Question: Who should Somprabha marry? The warrior, the poet, or the engineer? Answer: As a husband should be able to protect his wife from all forms of danger, the warrior is most worthy among the three as he alone was able to defeat and save Somprabha from the demon.
5	"The Story of Padmavati and Prince Vajramukti"	Rajni Bala as Dai Ma; Ramesh Bhatkar as Diwan's son Satish Kaul as Prince Vajramukti; Rama Vij as Padmavati
Short Summary:Prince Vajramukti is a handsome Prince of a Kingdom.He is in friendship with his Diwan(Minister)'s Son.One day, both wandered around the forest where the Prince sees a beautiful girl and is smitten by her beauty. He asked her about her name, address, and her father's occupation by which she replied by pointing herself with a lotus, touching her ear and acting as if uprooting the tooth. This puzzles Vajramukti and he asks his friend about it who easily solves the puzzles and knows her whereabouts in Karnapur as Dentist's daughter and named Padmavati. Then he finds her and proposes marriage, which she accepts. But, the King of Karnapur is also smitten by her and intends to marry her. Vajramukti is angered by it but his friend advised a peaceful way of solving the problem. The Diwan's son disguised as a thief steals Padmavati's Jewelry and then again disguised as a sage goes to king and says that the girl with the particular jewelry has enticed him sexually. This enraged the king and he immediately exiles Padmavati who is then happily married to Vajramukti. Question: Who is more sinful and culprit among the three Prince, Diwan's Son or the King? Answer: The king is more sinful as Prince has loved the girl and Diwan's son is only helping his friend but the King had exiled an innocent girl without any proof or evidence.
6	"Rich Girl Accepts Thief as Husband "	Vijay Arora as King Veerketu; Puneet Issar as Thief; Mulraj Rajda as Ratnasen; Rama Vij as the Rich Girl
Short Summary:King Veerketu is king of Ayodhya. He is tensed as his kingdom is rampaged by an unknown thief. He decides to nab the thief himself by disguising himself as a thief himself. Meanwhile, a rich girl Manna meets a young man. The man impresses her with his unique acrobatic and physical skills and talent. Manna begins to like him and vice versa. Manna has a record of rejecting several qualified men as her suitor. Then the very night, the king(disguised) meets the thief (same young man) and befriends him. Then the thief reveals that he wanted to be a soldier but the corruption of ministers has kept him far from his aim. Then the king reveals himself and nabs him. He is put on trial. Then, Manna's father vows to protect the thief as her daughter loved him and Manna wanted to marry him. This declaration makes the thief cry and laugh simultaneously. After learning all the truth and sake of friendship with the thief, Veerkutu released the thief and appoints him his Commander. Question: Why the thief cries and laughs simultaneously after hearing the declaration of the Rich Man? AnswerThe thief cries because as he knew he can't repay the deeds of the Manna and her father as he is going to die, and he laughed because he couldn't believe in his fate as Manna liked him over other qualified suitors.
7	"King Chandrasen and His Servant Satvasheel"	Vijay Arora as King Chandrasen; Satish Kaul as Satvasheel; Rama Vij as the Sea Princess
Short Summary:Satvasheel has been looking for a job at the royal courthouse but of no avail. Finally, one day, he comes face to face with a weary king in the jungle. Satvasheel offers the king some water and amla. The king accepts the simple offering but remembers the good deed done by a stranger. The king then appoints Satvasheel to his court, where Satvasheel grows and becomes an important part of. One day, the king sends Satvasheel to explore the kingdom around him. As directed, Satvasheel journeys on into the deep seas, only to find a secret kingdom. He fearlessly approaches the kingdom, is greeted by the queen of the kingdom, and spends some time with them. The king's apprentices wait for Satvasheel but after not hearing back from him for a while, return to the kingdom. A few days later, Satvasheel emerges from a pond in front of the king. Satvasheel then proceeds to provide details of his adventures with the kingdom under water. The King now wants to explore it by himself and takes Satvasheel along with him to the land under the sea. There the king and Satvasheel bravely fight off security guards and take over the kingdom. The king decides that Satvasheel should marry the queen of the newly acquired kingdom and in this way, repays the loan of the two amla fruits Satvasheel had given to the king that one dreary afternoon. Question:Who is the bravest of the two? Satvasheel or the king? AnswerSatvasheel is the braver of the two. Satvasheel had no idea what he was getting himself into when he jumped into the waters of the sea to find out more about the kingdom. But he still showed no doubt and jumped straight in. The king had been informed of the dangers that might possibly have been in the kingdom at the sea and was thus prepared. Bravery can be measured by the actions of a man who does not know what he is getting himself into.
8	"Three Sensitive Brothers "	Rajni Bala as the Court Singer; Sunil Lahri as the First Brother; Sameer Rajda as Second Brother; Babloo Mukherjee as Third Brother; Mulraj Rajda as the King; Thanks to Sanjay Khan for the tortoise
Short Summary: Three sensitive brothers are sent by their father to fetch a tortoise from the faraway sea for the local pond. Upon reaching their destination, when they find the tortoise, neither of them wants to carry the tortoise home, and they get into an argument on who is the most sensitive amongst them (and should not be assigned to carry the tortoise). They approach the local king for a decision at his palace, where they have food, listen to a recital, and sleep over. The eldest brother smells of burning corpses in the food, which is later discovered to be from a field next to a cremation ground. The second brother cannot sit next to the court vocalist because of the smell of goat's milk, which the vocalist mentions she had in her childhood. The youngest brother cannot sleep and has a bruise on his back, because of a hair later discovered under the three mattresses he is sleeping on. Question: Which of the brothers is the most sensitive? Answer: The youngest brother is the most sensitive since his bruise could be seen in reality (the others could be making it up/ knew it somehow).
9	"The Husband, the Thief, and the Lover "	Vijay Arora as the Husband; Ramesh Bhatkar as the Thief; Satish Kaul as the Lover; Sangeeta Naik as Madan Sena; Mulraj Rajda as Father-in-Law
Short Summary: A young man was madly in love with Madan Sena and swears to give up his life if she doesn't come to meet him on the next full moon. Meanwhile, Madan Sena's parents have her marriage arranged and she is married to a different man before the fateful day. She moves in with her husband and one day two thieves enter her new home, hoping to steal some valuables. One of thief sees Madan Sena and impressed by her beauty hopes to one day marry someone like her and settle down. Soon the fateful day approaches, and Madan Sena afraid that her lover might actually end his life, decides to go meet him. She asks permission from her husband who to her surprise lets her go out to meet this man on her first wedding night. The husband however disguises himself and follows her at a distance with a sword. On the way to meet the lover, she meets the thief who tells her that since she has left her married home, she now belongs to him. However she begs to see the lover and is allowed to go on the condition that she will come back to him soon. She then meets the lover who cannot believe that Madan Sena had kept her word. However seeing the vermillion on her head he realizes that she is married now. As a result, the lover decides to give up on Madan Sena because she is now married to someone else and he would not partake of this sin. On the way back she meets the thief as promised, and he is surprised to find out the extraordinary stories of the two men. He is so moved by these stories that he decides to let Madan Sena go against his baser instinct. Question: Which of three men made the biggest sacrifice? Answer: The thief because his sacrifice was selfless and that is how sacrifices should be.
10	"The Prince and the Three Sensitive Sisters"	Bijaya Jena (Dolly Jena) as the most sensitive princess Mrigangvati, Rajni Bala as Taravalli; Mohan Choti as Munim; Vijay Kavish as Prabandhak; Sunil Lahri as the Prince; Lilliput as the Servant; Rama Vij as Indulekha
Short Summary:
11	"Whom Will the Princess Marry?"	Vijay Arora as the Birdman; Puneet Issar as the Brave Man; Satish Kaul as the Vaid; Vijay Kavish as the Weaver; Mulraj Rajda as the King; Rama Vij as the Princess
Short Summary: Once the princess decides to leave her palace and go around and visit places in her kingdom. On her way she meets a Birdman who understands and talks with birds. Impressed by his unique skill she asks him to come to the palace and teach her, too. She then meets a Weaver whose woven cloth is very fine and has good export demand. She wishes that she could weave with such ability. On her journey ahead she falls ill and is hence treated by a Vaid (Doctor in Hindi language). Looking at the philanthropic work he does, she expresses that she too wishes to leave her palace and help poor people just like he does. On her way back home, she is attacked by dacoits and a Brave Man saves her. Back in her palace, the King decides that she should now get married and announces that all suitable Grooms can present themselves. Question: Of the Birdman, Weaver, Doctor and the Brave Man who will the Princess marry? Answer: Vikram replies that the Princess will marry the Brave Man as with him she would always be secure. Other attractions she had for other men would not last long enough.
12	"Who Is the Real Father"	Rajni Bala as Bhagwati; Ramesh Bhatkar as the Greedy Man; Puneet Issar as the Thief; Babloo Mukherjee as Dhanwati's Son; Sangeeta Naik as Dhanwati; Mulraj Rajda as the King
Short Summary: Bhagwati and her daughter, Dhanwati are new to the town. At night, they meet a thief who would be prosecuted the following day. The thief offers to marry Bhagwati's daughter, saying that after he is hanged, all his wealth will be theirs, and he will also get a son to perform his rituals after his death. Understanding the mutual benefit, the two get married on the same night and have a son. The next day, after he is hanged, the mother and daughter go to discover the immense riches of the thief. Using his wealth, they lead a lavish life. Bhagwati now offers Dhanwati to a man, who in the greed of their wealth, readily agrees. On the wedding night, he runs away with all their wealth. Losing all her wealth and her mother subsequently, Dhanwati roams the streets to beg for food with her young boy. Once they saw the prince being engulfed by a python. The young boy tried to save him, but in vain. Nevertheless, his bravery was seen and rewarded by the king, who in turn offered them patronage and made the boy the King upon his death. Question: Of the three men, whose rituals must the boy perform? Answer: Vikram replies that the thief who married Dhanwati a day before the prosecution is the real father. The second man married Dhanwati out of his greed, while the king due to his moral duty gave them shelter. So, the son must perform the rituals of the first man.
13	"The Giant and the Brave Boy"	Vijay Arora as the King; Rajni Bala as the Boy's Mother; Deepika as the Queen; Lilliput as the Boy's Father; Sameer Rajda as the Brave Boy; Shamsuddin as the Giant
Short Summary:
14	"Love Is Eternal "	Vijay Arora as Haridatt; Satish Kaul as Madhusudan; Kaajal Kiran as Madhumalti; Sunil Lahri as Vaman; Mulraj Rajda as Pandit
Short Summary: There is a priest named Keshav living in Yamuna Nagar. He met a new person Haridutt who was in the town for business told priest that he will stay in village. Priest's daughter, Malti comes to the temple and invites him for the food at home. Haridutt is impressed by her beauty and tells priest that he likes his daughter and proposes to marry her. Malti reaches home and sees some guests with their son Baaman. They propose to marry him with Malti and Malti's mother agrees for the same. At the same time Malti's brother visits his master. Master tells him that his disciple Madhusudan wants to marry his sister. Father, mother and brother fight amongst each other that who should marry Malti. One day Malti was in the garden when snake bit her. Her parents tried her treatment but she died. Her family members and the would be grooms cremated her. Madhusudan decided to leave the city and live life of a saint. Baaman also told that he will also roam in forests with her bones. Haridutt decided to have ashes with him throughout his life and live at the same place as mark of his love. Madhusudan stayed at a place in one town with daughter and father. Sometime later, his son-in-law reaches there who is severely injured. Daughter requests father to save his life. Father agrees and tells that using his knowledge he will bring him back to life. Madhusudan hears this and is surprised. Using his knowledge he brings him back to life. All are happy. At night, Madhusudan steals the knowledge book and runs from there. He reaches the same place where Haridutt was living in his cottage. Baaman also comes at the same place. They keep the bones and ashes over there. Madhusudan begins to recite hymns and soon Malti comes back to life. All are happy to see her alive. Question: whom should Malti marry now?as all of them have contributed in bringing her to life? Answer: Vikrama replied that she should marry Haridutt because Madhusudan who brought her to life is like her father now. Baaman saved the bones of Malti so he is like a son, so he too cannot marry her while Haridutt lived at that place just for love.
15	"The Lover of Princess Chandraprabha"	Ramesh Bhatkar as Mantri Putra; Deepika as Princess Chandraprabha; Vijay Kavish as the Magician's Son; Lilliput as the Magician; Babloo Mukherjee as Manu Kumar / Manu Kumari; Mulraj Rajda as the King
Short Summary:
16	"The Dilemma of Mahamantri and King Vallabh"	Vijay Arora as King Vallabh; Rajni Bala ... Mahamantri's Wife; Ramesh Bhatkar ... Mahamantri; Lilliput as the Painter; Shamsuddin as Rakshas; Amrita Ghosh as the Gandharv Kanya
Short Summary:
17	"The Unsuccessful Penance of Gunkar"	Rajni Bala as Gunkar's Mother; Ramesh Bhatkar as The Saint; Vijayendra Ghatge as Gunkar; Lilliput as the Gambler; Mulraj Rajda as Gunkar's Father; Amrita Ghosh as the Apsara
Short Summary: Gunkar loses his poor father's all hard-earned money in gambling. He is hence kicked out of the home. Wandering, he meets a saint who with his yogic powers can bring forth anything that one wants. Gunnar asks the saint to teach him power. Saint agrees and asks him to follow the two-fold way of attaining the power. Midway after completing the first step Gunkar decides to go home and meet his family. He asks the saint to bring in some clothes to take to his home as gifts. After returning, Gunkar finishes his second step. But he is not able to get the power. Question: Betaal ask for what reason Gunkar could not attain the power although he did just as he was instructed by the saint? Answer: Vikram answers that Gunkar failed as he did not follow the way properly as he was distracted and cut it into two and went home.
18	"The Story of Rajkumar and the Bird"	Sunil Lahri as Rajkumar Jimutvahan; Lilliput as The Chief
Short Summary:
19	"The Gambling Temptation of Gopu"	Ramesh Bhatkar as Gopu; Deepika as Ratna; Lilliput as the Gambler; Mulraj Rajda as Ratna's Father
Short Summary:
20	"The Realization of Prince Anandsen"	Ramesh Bhatkar as Haribaba; Deepika as Princess Roopvati; Satish Kaul as Yuvraj Anandsen; Mulraj Rajda as Raja Dharamveer
Short Summary:
21	"The Legendary Love of Sukesh and Legendary Duty of King Dharamveer"	Vijay Arora ... King Dharamveer; Rajni Bala as Pari; Suraj Chaddha as Sukesh; Anil Chaudhary as Mantri; Deepika Chikhalia as Nandini; Vijay Kavish as Divya Atma; Lilliput as Jadoogar Abhijeet; Vilas Raj as Pradhan Mantri; Mulraj Rajda as Yashwant Dubey; Vikram Sahu as Nagar Seth
Short Summary:
22	"The Love Story of Four Princes"	Vijay Arora as Prince Govind; Ramesh Bhatkar as Prince Amar; Deepika as Rajkumari; Satish Kaul as Prince Ajay; Vijay Kavish as Chamatkari Yogi; Sunil Lahri as Prince Vijay; Lilliput as Rakshas; Vilas Raj as Vaidya; Mulraj Rajda as Rajah
Short Summary:
23	"The Justice of King Satyadev"	Vijay Arora as Kavi Haribhat; Ramesh Bhatkar as Kaliya; Bandini Mishra as Rajkumari Priyavanda; Mulraj Rajda as Raja Satyadev; Hari Shukla as Raja Dharamdev
Short Summary: Princess Priyavanda falls into love with the court poet Haribhat. Haribhat and Princess exchanged letters of love regularly. Haribhat however was not in love with her, rather her wealth and the kingdom. One day the king's arch enemy Dharamdev arrives to forge an alliance by asking Priyavanda's hand in marriage for his son. When the poet got to know about this, he asked Priyavanda to give him all her jewels and precious articles, otherwise he will leak out their love letters to her in-laws. This is heard by the thief Kaliya. He goes to Haribhat's home, kills him, and returns the letters to Priyavanda. But he is caught by the soldiers. Priyavanda requests her father to free him, for he had protected her self respect. Question: What must the king legislate? Answer: A king must order in the favour of his kingdom. He must punish the long time thief, regardless of his act towards the princess.
24	"The Dreams of Dagdoo"	Rajni Bala as Dagdoo's Mother; Paintal as Dagdoo; Mulraj Rajda as Maharaja
Short Summary: Dagdoo and his mother live in a village. Dagdoo gets precognitive dreams. He always tells people what will happen but the villagers consider him bad luck kick him out of village. Whilst resting a forest, he comes across the King who employs him as a bodyguard. Dagdoo does his job very diligently. One night when the King is asleep, Dagdoo also falls asleep while working. He then dreams of something harmful happening to the King. He decides not to tell about it due to fear of being ostracised. He then remembers his mothers words that he should tell things in a different way. The King has to leave for Sonpur due to some work when Dagdoo advises not to go since there will be a earthquake. The King decides to stay back, Sonpur is devasted by earthquake where all its inhabitants die. The king is relieved that has been saved. Dagdoo then tells the king about the dreams he gets all the time and is rewarded. At the sametime, he dismisses Dagdoo from his duties. Question: Why did the king reward as well as dismiss Dagdoo? Answer: The reward was given due to Dagdoo preventing the King to leave and thus saving his life. Dagdoo was dismissed because he must have been sleeping in order to see the dream. Sleeping isn't allowed when guarding the palace.
25	"The Story of Greedy Apurva "	Vijay Arora as Rajkumar Ambrish; Ramesh Bhatkar as Apurva; Anil Chaudhary as Vyapari; Deepika as Anjali; Sunil Lahri as Satyakam; Mulraj Rajda as Avinash
Short Summary: Apurva is a poor person working as stonesmith who always dreamt of being rich. He had a rich friend named Avinash. Apurva's daughter Anjali & Avinash's son Satyakam were in love. Their kids did not care about each other's financial status. Avinash has go out of town and trusted Satyakam to take care of matters in the interim. Apurva develops ill intentions and decides to steal accounting documents from the Avinash's treasure box. He then acts as Avinash and settles accounts from other people by pretending to be Avinash and forging his signature. Avinash had entrusted Satyakam to settle an old debt but due to Apurva cheating, Satyakam is left with no money. He then decides to sell his house. Avinash & Satyakam are left penniless whereas Apurva celebrates his ill gotten gains. Anjali overhears all this. She then goes to the King & Prince Ambrish and tells all this but the King says it's upto the affected person to complain, not her. She then tells to Satyakam but he does not want to complain since it will bring bad name to family. Ambrish hears all this. Ghost of Avinash comes and takes away the stolen money from all the culprits. Ambrish has fallen in love with Anjali and orders for Satyakam to be killed. Avinash's ghost appears in front of Apurva and spooks him. He then requests 100,000 coins as a loan from Apurva. Apurva goes to collect his money the next day and is confronted by ghosts of his old friends. Avinash says that he cannot return the money since ghosts do not return money. Apurva is shunned by all his friends due to his poverty. Ambrish, disguised as Satyakam by magic, goes to marry Anjali. Real Satyakam appears in the wedding. Ambrish then reveals his true form. King also appears and orders Ambrish to be captured. Ghost of Avinash appears and blesses the couple. Avinash's ghost repays 100,000 coins to Apurva who in turns gives it to the newly married saying he does not deserve it anymroe Question: Why did Apurva give the money back to couple? Answer: Money causes 3 predicaments. When you are poor, you are worried about earning. When you have money, you are worried about maintaining it. When you lose your money, then you die from inside. Apurva realises that ill gotten gains will never let anyone leave in peace.
26	"The Revenge of Nagin "	Vijay Arora as Yuvraj Shaktinath; Rajni Bala as Princess Arundhati; Anil Chaudhary as Arundhati's Brother; Deepika as Nageshwari; Mulraj Rajda as Raja Hargovind Das
Short Summary: There was a King called Hargovind Das who employed a servant called Ganga. Ganga kept two snakes called Nagesh & Nageshwari. Princess Rajni was blessed by the snakes to bear a son. One day both the snakes, in their human form, were dancing in the garden. Shaktinath accidentally shot an arrow on Nageshwar. Nageshwari decides to take revenge on the prince. Nageshwari requests the king to allow her exact revenge on the prince. King then requests Nageshwari to allow his son to live a few days so he gets to see his new born child to which she agrees. Princess Arundhati decides to kill Nageshhwari is stopped by the guards and gives birth at the same time. Nageshwari then sees the 3 daughters of the prince feeding milk to her baby snakes. Nageshwari goes on to kill the Shaktinath but Arundhati falls unconscious seeing her. Shaktinath then welcomes Nageshwari to kill him. Question: Will Nageshwari kill Princ Shaktinath? Answer: Vikram replied that the Nagin would not bite Prince Shaktinath, because motherly affection would win over revenge. Though the King took off his crown in front of her, it did not affect her decision, but the moment she saw Arundhati's daughters feeding her children, it shook her, and her motherly affection rose up. She realized that by killing the prince, she was depriving those girls of their father, and she could not do that. As for the promise that she had given her dead husband, the Nagin jumped into the fire of the Yagya and killed herself so that she did not have to remain alive to fulfill her promise.

== See also ==
- Vikram Betaal Ki Rahasya Gatha
- Singhasan Battisi
