= Daag (1973 film) =

1973 Indian film by Yash Chopra

Daag – A Poem of Love
- Theatrical Poster
- Directed by: Yash Chopra
- Written by: Story: Gulshan Nanda; Dialogue: Akhtar-Ul-Iman
- Produced by: Yash Chopra
- Starring: Rajesh Khanna; Sharmila Tagore; Raakhee
- Cinematography: Kay Gee
- Edited by: Pran Mehra
- Music by: Laxmikant Pyarelal
- Production company: Yash Raj Films
- Distributed by: Yash Raj Films
- Release date: 27 April 1973
- Running time: 146 minutes
- Country: India
- Language: Hindi

Daag: A Poem of Love (transl. maraka) is a 1973 Indian Hindi-language romantic drama film produced and directed by Yash Chopra in his debut as a producer, which laid the foundation of Yash Raj Films (formerly the biggest production house in India). The film stars Rajesh Khanna, Sharmila Tagore and Raakhee in lead roles, with Madan Puri, Kader Khan, Prem Chopra and A. K. Hangal. The music by Laxmikant Pyarelal dominated the charts for the year. The film was later remade into the Telugu film Vichitra Jeevitham (1978).

At the 21st Filmfare Awards, Daag: A Poem of Love received 7 nominations, including Best Film, Best Actor (Khanna) and Best Actress (Tagore), and won 2 awards – Best Director (Chopra) and Best Supporting Actress (Raakhee).

== Plot ==
A young man, Sunil Kohli, falls for the beautiful Sonia. Soon, they get married and leave for their honeymoon. On the way, owing to bad weather, they decide to spend a night at a bungalow owned by Sunil's boss. The boss's son, Dheeraj Kapoor, tries to rape Sonia when she is alone. But Sunil arrives in time, and a fight ensues, resulting in the death of Dheeraj. Sunil is arrested and, later, sentenced to life imprisonment by the court. But, on the way to prison, the police van carrying him meets with an accident. All occupants are killed.

Years later, Sonia, working as a school teacher and bringing up Sunil's and her son, finds out that her husband is still alive. He is living with a new identity as Sudhir, and is married to a rich woman named Chandni. After escaping from the police van, Sunil met Chandni, whose lover had ditched her on learning of her pregnancy. Sunil married her to provide legitimacy to her child, in return for her help in establishing his new identity. Now, after so many years, the law is once again at his doorstep. This time, however, there is an added crime to his name: bigamy.

== Cast ==
- Rajesh Khanna as Sunil Kohli / Sudhir
- Sharmila Tagore as Sonia Kohli
- Raakhee as Chandni
- Prem Chopra as Dheeraj Kapoor
- Baby Pinky as Pinky
- Raju Shrestha (Master Raju) as Rinku
- Manmohan Krishna as Deewan, Chandni's father
- Madan Puri as K. C. Khanna
- Achala Sachdev as Mrs. Malti Khanna
- Iftekhar as Inspector Singh
- Hari Shivdasani as Jagdish Kapoor
- Yashodra Katju as School Principal
- Kader Khan as Prosecuting attorney
- A. K. Hangal as Prosecuting Attorney / Judge
- S. N. Banerjee as Judge
- Karan Dewan as Doctor Kapoor who treats Chandni's father
- Surendra as Sunil's uncle
- Jagdish Raj as Ram Singh (driver)
- Manmohan as Prisoner in van fighting with Sunil
- Padma Khanna as Dancer
- Aruna as Dancer
- Habib as Blacksmith removing Sunil's handcuffs
- Saul George as Jr. Artist

== Soundtrack ==
The soundtrack includes the following tracks, composed by Laxmikant Pyarelal, and with lyrics by Sahir Ludhianvi

- The song "Ab Chahe Ma Roothe Yaa Baba" was listed at #7 on Binaca Geetmala annual list 1973
- The song "Mere Dil Mein Aaj Kya Hai" was listed at #20 on Binaca Geetmala annual list 1973

Daag: A Poem of Love

Soundtrack album by Laxmikant Pyarelal
- Released: 1973 (India)
- Genre: Film soundtrack
- Label: Saregama
- Producer: Laxmikant Pyarelal

Laxmikant Pyarelal chronology
Gaai Aur Gori (1973)	Daag: A Poem of Love (1973)	Barkha Bahar (1973)

#	Title	Singer(s)	Duration
1	"Mere Dil Mein Aaj Kya Hai"	Kishore Kumar	04:19
2	"Ab Chahe Ma Roothe Yaa Baba"	Kishore Kumar, Lata Mangeshkar	05:36
3	"Hum Aur Tum Tum Aur Hum"	Kishore Kumar, Lata Mangeshkar	04:07
4	"Jab Bhi Jee Chaahe"	Lata Mangeshkar	04:19
5	"Main To Kuchh Bhi Nahin"	Rajesh Khanna	02:28
6	"Ni Main Yaar Manana Ni"	Lata Mangeshkar, Minoo Purushottam	05:48
7	"Hawa Chale Kaise"	Lata Mangeshkar	05:46

== Awards and nominations ==
21st Filmfare Awards:

Won

- Best Director – Yash Chopra
- Best Supporting Actress – Raakhee

Nominated

- Best Film
- Best Actor – Rajesh Khanna
- Best Actress – Sharmila Tagore
- Best Music Director – Laxmikant Pyarelal
- Best Male Playback Singer – Kishore Kumar for "Mere Dil Mein Aaj Kya Hai"
