= Nagin Aur Suhagin =

- Directed by: Shantilal Soni
- Music by: Usha Khanna
- Release date: 1979
- Country: India
- Language: Hindi

Nagin Aur Suhagin is a 1979 Bollywood adventure film directed by Shantilal Soni.

== Cast ==
- Vijay Arora... Anand Singh
- Rita Bhaduri ... Gauri J. Singh / Kamla (as Rheeta Baduri)
- Mahesh Bhatt
- Laxmi Chhaya ... Naag Kanya
- Harita Dave
- Devyani ... Gauri's sister-in-law
- Kalpana Divan
- C.S. Dubey ... Thakur Zoravar Singh
- Jairaj ... Thakur Jagatpal Singh
- Baby Minal ... Young Geeta
- Mulraj Rajda
- Geera Shah
- Jagdish Shah
- Namita Shah ... Geeta
- Baby Suparna ... Young Gauri
