= Maganbhai Patel =

Indian politician (born 1916)

Member of Parliament, Lok Sabha
- In office 1989–1991
- Preceded by: H.M. Patel
- Succeeded by: Arvind Trivedi
- Constituency: Sabarkantha, Gujarat

Personal details
- Born: 25 April 1916 Prantij, Sabarkantha District, British India
- Party: Janata Dal
- Spouse: Nandaben
- Children: 3 sons and a daughter

Maganbhai Manibhai Patel (born 25 April 1916) is an Indian politician. He was elected to the Lok Sabha, lower house of the Parliament of India from Sabarkantha in 1989 as a member of the Janata Dal.
