= Jeet Upendra =

Indian television actor

- Born: 13 March 1964 (age 62); Mumbai, Maharashtra, India
- Occupation: Actor
- Years active: 1985 – present
- Spouse: Deepshikha Nagpal (m. 1997; div. 2007)
- Children: Vedhika Upendra; Vivaan Upendra

Jeet Upendra is an Indian actor who has appeared in Malayalam, Gujarati and Hindi films. He started his career with many direct-to-video films like the Aditya Pancholi starrer Abhishek, Scandal. Later he appeared in the films Afsana Pyaar Ka with Aamir Khan and Johnnie Walker, with Mammootty playing his brother. He often excelled in negative characters. He is busy with many television serials as well.

== Partial filmography ==
- Ishaara – 2008
- Hum Pyar Tumhi Se Kar Baithe – 2002
- Paiso Maro Parmeshwar – 2002 (Gujarati)
- Inteqam – 2001
- Miss 420 – 1998
- Maa Ki Mamta – 1995
- Johnnie Walker – 1992 (Malayalam)
- Panaah – 1992
- Baharon Ke Manzil – 1991
- Humne Pyar Kiya – 1991
- Afsana Pyar Ka – 1991
- Lakhi Durga Saraswati – 1991
- Danga Fasaad – 1990

=== Video films ===
- Uncha Uncha Madi aya – 2004 (Gujarati)
- Naqli Chehra – 1989
- Abhishek – 1987
- Jazira – 1987
- Shahadat – 1986
- Scandal – 1985
