= Saanch Ko Aanch Nahin =

- Directed by: Satyen Bose
- Written by: Sharad Joshi (story); Govind Moonis (screenplay & dialogues)
- Produced by: Tarachand Barjatya
- Cinematography: Anil Mitra
- Edited by: Mukhtar Ahmed
- Music by: Raam Laxman
- Release date: 1979
- Running time: 138 min
- Country: India
- Language: Hindi

Saanch Ko Aanch Nahin (alternative: Truth Needs No Support) is a 1979 Bollywood drama film directed by Satyen Bose. This film was inspired by the story Panch Parmeshwar, written by the famous writer Premchand. The film was produced by Tarachand Barjatya. The film stars Arun Govil, Om Shivpuri and Urmila Bhatt, and also marked the debut of actress Madhu Kapoor.

== Plot ==
Manoharlal Agarwal (played by Om Shivpuri) and Satyaprakash Agarwal (played by Arvind Deshpande) are wealthy businessmen and close friends. Manoharlal enters into a dispute with Hariram and to solve this he asks his friend Satyaprakash to be the sole arbitrator. To bond their friendship more, Manoharlal proposes to wed his daughter Nirmala (played by Madhu Kapoor) with Satyaprakash's son Ajay (played by Arun Govil). He also proposes this in order to get favour from Satyaprakash in his case.

Given the acceptances from both the families, Nirmala and Ajay keep meeting each other and soon fall in love. They are also engaged. But as the events in the case turn out, Satyaprakash gives his decision in favour of Hariram. This agitates Manoharlal and in vengeance he decides to break off the wedding. With his power of money he also gets himself appointed as a sole arbitrator in one of the cases involving Satyaprakash. He then decides to rule against Satyaprakash and ruin him financially. Nirmala is also made to marry another man, Murli. But just before the wedding, she decides to elope with Ajay. Seeing that her daughter has departed, Nirmala's mother goes in shock and falls critically ill. Hence Ajay brings back Nirmala so that her mother can feel better.

In the case, Manoharlal sees how Satyaprakash is really innocent. Hence, with all the truth in front of him, he is unable to give a false verdict just for the sake of his vengeance. He thus realises in what situation Satyaprakash had been when he ruled and realises how the truth needs no support and always wins. They both patch up their animosity and the two lovers, Nirmala and Ajay, also get married.

== Cast ==
- Arun Govil as Ajay
- Madhu Kapoor as Nirmala
- Om Shivpuri as Manoharlal Agarwal
- Urmila Bhatt as Mrs. Sharda M. Agarwal (Nirmala's mother)
- Arvind Deshpande as Satyaprakash Agarwal
- Sunder
- Gajanan Jagirdar as Hariram
- Birbal as Bahadur (Chauffeur)
- Om Puri
- C.S. Dubey as Ganeshi (Murli's father)
- Javed Khan as Kailash (Ajay's friend)
- Ram Mohan as Manikchand
- Madhu Shah as Mrs. Pratap M. AgarRwal

== Music ==
The songs of the film are composed by the musical duo Raam Laxman on lyrics penned by Kulwant Jani and Ravindra Rawal.

No.	Title	Lyrics	Singer(s)	Length
1.	"Hari Hari Mehndi Ki Pattiyan"		Shailender Singh, Usha Mangeshkar	03:38
2.	"I Love You (I)"	Kulwant Jani	Shailender Singh, Usha Mangeshkar	03:37
3.	"I Love You (II)"	Kulwant Jani	Shailender Singh, Usha Mangeshkar	04:32
4.	"Aankhon Ankhon Mein Dil Gaya Apna"		Shailender Singh	03:32
5.	"Mere Bas Mein"		Shailender Singh	04:10
6.	"Aaj Meri Didi Ki Sagai"	Ravindra Rawal	Usha Mangeshkar	05:11

== Reception ==
The film was a modest success. Film World wrote "Saanch Ko Aanch Nahin is no patch on the earlier hit pictures of Rajshri, like Dulhan Wahi...". Madhu has said of her appearance in the film and several others in the 1980s: "I made mistakes and signed some wrong movies" and cited it as to why her career never took off.
