= Ramayan (1987 TV series) =

Indian epic television series

- Ramayan promotional poster
- Genre: Epic
- Created by: Ramanand Sagar
- Based on: Ramayana and Ramcharit Manas
- Written by: Ramanand Sagar
- Directed by: Ramanand Sagar
- Starring: Arun Govil; Dipika Chikhlia; Sunil Lahri; Arvind Trivedi; Dara Singh
- Narrated by: Ashok Kumar; Ramanand Sagar
- Opening theme: Sita Ram Charit Ati Pawan by Jaidev
- Composer: Ravindra Jain
- Country of origin: India
- Original language: Hindi
- No. of seasons: 1
- No. of episodes: 78

Production
- Executive producer: Subhash Sagar
- Producers: Ramanand Sagar; Anand Sagar; Moti Sagar
- Production locations: Umbergaon, Valsad, Gujarat
- Cinematography: Ajit Naik
- Editor: Subhash Sehgal
- Camera setup: Multi-Camera
- Running time: 35 minutes
- Production company: Sagar Arts

Original release
- Network: DD National
- Release: 25 January 1987 – 31 July 1988

Related
- Luv Kush

Ramayan (also known as Ramanand Sagar's Ramayan) is an Indian Hindi-language epic television series based on ancient Indian Sanskrit Epic Ramayana. The show was created, written, and directed by Ramanand Sagar. It originally aired between 1987 and 1988 on DD National and it was narrated by Ashok Kumar and the director Ramanand Sagar. The music was composed by Ravindra Jain. During its run, the show became the most watched television series in the world, garnering a viewership of 82 percent. The repeat telecast was aired on 20 different channels in 17 countries on all the five continents at different times. The success of the series was documented well by the media. According to BBC, the serial has been viewed by over 650 million viewers. Each episode of the series reportedly earned DD National ₹40 lakh.

The show is primarily based on Valmiki's Ramayana and Tulsidas' Ramcharitmanas. Other sources used were: Tamil Kamba Ramayanam, Marathi Bhavartha Ramayana, Bengali Krutivas Ramayan, Telugu Ranganatha Ramayanam, Kannada Ramachandra Charita Purana, Malayalam Adhyatma Ramayanam, Urdu Ramayan by Chakbast. Ramayan was the most expensive Indian TV show produced at the time with a budget of ₹9 lakh per episode.

When the series was telecast every Sunday morning, BBC recalled, "streets would be deserted, shops would be closed and people would bathe and garland their TV sets before the serial began." The series was re-aired during the 2020 coronavirus lockdown and broke several viewership records globally; the show became the most watched TV show in the world with 77 million viewership on 16 April 2020.

== Premise ==
Adapted and based on the ancient Hindu epic Ramayana, the series follows the journey of Ram who goes to an exile of 14 years along with Sita and Lakshman.

Lord Vishnu decides to incarnate on earth as Ram, the son of King Dasharath and Queen Kaushalya of Ayodhya to kill Ravan, the evil king of Lanka and establish dharma whereas Goddess Lakshmi would incarnate as his wife Sita. In Ayodhya, a childless Dashrath conducts a putrakameshthi yagna for children and as a result, his three wives gives birth to 4 sons. Kaushalya to Ram, Kaikeyi to Bharat and Sumitra to Lakshman and Shatrughan. The 4 boys grow up to be excellent warriors under Guru Vashista's training. Shri Ram is an ideal and perfect son and brother and is a role model to his three younger brothers and always respects his parents and their affection towards him.

After the brothers return after completing their education, Rishi Vishvamitra arrives at Ayodhya for help as his yagna is disturbed by some demons and asks Dashrath to send Shree Ram to him to kill those demons. Dashrath reluctantly agrees and Lakshman also accompanies Ram. Shri Ram succeeds in killing Taraka and her son Subahu and also protects the yagnas. Rishi Vishvamitra later teaches him about many things required for future.

Later, he takes the two brothers to Mithila to seek the blessings of Lord Shiva's bow at the swayamvar of Princess Sita. Rishi Vishvamitra tells them about the birth of Sita from earth. On their way Ram frees Ahalya of her curse by her husband Rishi Gautama. They reach Mithila where preparation for the swayamvar was in full swing. Ram and Sita meet at Pushp vatika and fall in love at first sight. Sita prays to Goddess Gauri for Ram to be her husband. Next day, Shri Ram wins the swayamvar by breaking Lord Shiva's bow and marriage is fixed. His family at Ayodhya is also informed of the same and Dashrath, along with Bharat and Shatrughna arrive Mithila and Lakshman's marriage is fixed with Urmila, Sita's younger sister whereas Bharat and Shatrughna are married to Mandavi and Shrutakirti, Sita's cousins. King Janak and his family bid a tearful goodbye to their daughters and here ends the Bala Kanda.

In due time, Bharat and Shatrughna leave for Kekeya to meet their grandfather and meanwhile, Dashrath decides to announce Ram as his heir. This decision is happily accepted by all the family members as well as the citizens. However, Kaikeyi's maid Manthara is not happy with the coronation and manipulates Kaikeyi to make Bharat as king. Kaikeyi asks two boons from Dashrath about which he promised years ago. She asks the throne for Bharat and 14 years exile for Ram much to the latter's shock. However, he is compelled to keep his promise.

Ram readily agrees and everyone, including the citizens, are shocked with the turn of events. Sita and Lakshman decides to accompany him. Urmila also wanted to accompany them but Lakshman stops her to take care of the family. Later, the three leave for vanvas after taking the blessings of elders, much to the dismay of Dashrath who breaks all ties with Kaikeyi for what she did. He asks his trusted minister Sumant to accompany Ram. The citizens also does not want to leave him. Ram is helped by his childhood friend Nishad Raj on the first day of vanvas and crosses Sarayu River with his help and decides to reside in Chitrakoot.

Meanwhile, in Ayodhya, everyone starts blaming Kaikeyi and Manthara and even Bharat as they doubt him to be involved in the conspiracy. Unable to bear the pain of separation from his son, Dashrath dies of grief due to a curse he got earlier. Ram in Chitrakoot and Bharat in Kekeya sense bad omen concurrently much to their worry. Bharat and Shatrughna return to Ayodhya and are shattered on hearing about their father's death and their brother's exile. Bharat despises Kaikeyi and decides to get back Ram. Kaikeyi later starts regretting her deeds. Bharat completes his father's final rites and along with whole Ayodhya, leaves to bring back Shri Ram and Sita.

At Chitrakoot, Lakshman sees Bharat approaching them and doubts him, ready to kill him but is stopped by Shree Ram. Later, Bharat arrives and the brothers share a reunion. Lakshman feels guilty for doubting Bharat. They are informed of Dashrath's death and feel depressed about it and reconcile with their mothers. Bharat tries to persuade Ram to return but he refuses owing to his father's promise. Janak arrives and suggests that Bharat rule Ayodhya on Ram's behalf. Everyone agrees to the decision. Bharat asks for Shri Ram's sandals and places it on the throne and leaves for Nandigram to live the life of an ascetic for 14 years. He rules the kingdom from there with Guru Vashisht's help. Everyone supports his decision. Ayodhya Kand ends at this moment and begins Aranya Kand.

Meanwhile, Shri Ram decides to move from Chitrakoot to fulfill his purpose. On their way, they meet Mata Anasuya who give Sita lessons on wife's duty and also gifts her a divine saree whose colour never fades and some jewellery which she got from Gods as a result of her devotion towards her husband. In the vanvas period the trio comes across many demons which are killed by Shri Ram and Lakshman. They meet Rishi Agastya who give them never-ending arrows for future purpose.Shri Ram, Sita and Lakshman decides to stay in Panchvati for the last year of exile. They also meet a vulture, Jatayu, an old acquaintance of their father who guides them.

One day, Shurpnakha, Ravan's sister comes to their hut with a marriage proposal which is rejected by both Shri Ram and Lakshman. Furious at the rejection, she attacks Sita in an attempt to kill her but Lakshman cuts her nose while defending his sister in law. Insulted, she seeks help from her cousins Khara and Dushan whom she lies about her actual intentions of approaching the trio. They go to Panchvati with their army and in the battle that follows, Shri Ram kills the whole army along with the demon brothers. Shurpnakha then decides to approach Ravan, the king of Lanka and convince him into killing the two brothers for Sita.

Ravan plots to kidnap Sita with the help of Mareech disguised as a deer and lure Shri Ram and Lakshman into going out of the hut leaving Sita alone.The vicious plan is successful and Ravan kidnaps Sita but is seen by Jatayu who loses his life while saving her. On his deathbed, he informs Shri Ram of Ravan's deeds.

Shree Ram completes Jatayu's final rites and leaves Panchvati with determination to search for Sita. Later, he comes across his devotee Shabri who guides him towards Rishyamukh Parvat to meet Sugriva and Hanuman, Shri Ram's devotee. Kishkindha Kand begins from here.

The brothers meet Hanuman who is in disguise to ensure they are not a threat to Sugriva and is overwhelmed on the revelation of Shri Ram's true identity and takes them to Sugriva where they are also introduced to Jambvant, Nal and Neel. Shri Ram kills Vali, Sugriv's brother who betrayed him. Later, they plan to send Kishkindha army in search of Sita and from here begins Sundar Kand.

== Cast ==
=== Main ===
- Arun Govil as Ram, Lord Vishnu's 7th incarnation of the Dashavatar; Dasharatha and Kaushalya's son; Sita's husband; Bharat, Lakshman And Shatrughan's elder brother; Lav and Kush's father.
- Deepika Chikhalia as Sita, Lakshmi, Goddess Lakshmi's incarnation; Janak and Sunaina's elder adoptive daughter; Bhumi Devi's daughter; Urmila, Mandavi, Shrutkirti 's elder sister; Ram's wife; Lav and Kush's mother.
- Sunil Lahri as Lakshman, Sheshnaag's incarnation; Dasharatha And Sumitra's elder twin son; Urmila's husband; Ram And Bharat's younger brother And Shatrughan's elder twin
- Arvind Trivedi as Ravana, Vishrava, Vishrava and Kaikesi's eldest son; Kumbhakarna, Vibhishan and Surpanakha's elder brother, Indrajit's father, Mandodari's husband.
- Dara Singh as Hanuman, Lord Shiva's incarnation; Lord Rama's devotee, Anjani and Kesari's son, Vayu's son.

=== Recurring ===
- Sanjay Jog as Bharat, the incarnation of Panchajanya, the conch held by Lord Vishnu'; Dasharatha and Kaikeyi's son; Mandavi's husband; Ram's younger brother, and Lakshman and Shatrughan's elder brother
- Sameer Rajda as Shatrughna, the incarnation of Lord Vishnu's Sudarshana; Dasharatha and Sumitra's younger twin son; Shrutakirti's husband, and Ram, and Bharat's younger brother, Lakshman's younger twin
- Bal Dhuri as Dasharatha, King Aja and Queen Indumati's son; Kausalya, Kaikeyi, and Sumitra's husband; Ram, Bharat, Laxman and Shatrughan's father, King of Kosala
- Jayshree Gadkar as Kausalya, Dasharatha's first wife; Ram's mother, Lakshman, Bharat and Shatrughna's foster mother
- Padma Khanna as Kaikeyi, Dasharatha's third wife; Bharat's mother, Ram, Lakshman and Shatrughan's foster Mother
- Rajnibala as Sumitra, Dasharatha's second wife; Lakshman and Shatrughan's mother, Ram and Bharat's foster mother
- Anjali Vyas as Urmila, Goddess Naga Lakshmi's incarnation; Janak and Sunaina's younger daughter; Sita and Mandavi's younger and Shrutkirti's elder sister; Lakshmana's wife
- Sulakshana Khatri as Mandavi, Goddess Lakshmi's flower avatar; Kushadhwaja and Chandrabhaga's elder daughter; Sita's younger and Urmila & Shrutakirti's elder sister; Bharat's wife
- Poonam Shetty as Shrutakirti, Goddess Lakshmi's flower; Kushadhwaja and Chandrabhaga's younger daughter; Sita, Urmila, Mandavi's younger sister; Shatrughan's wife
- Lalita Pawar as Manthara, Kaikeyi's evil maid
- Vijay Arora as Indrajit, Ravan and Mandodari's first son; Sulochana's husband; slain by Lakshman.
- Nalin Dave as Kumbhakarna, Vishrava and Kaikesi's second son; Ravana, Vibhishan and Surpanakha brother; slain by Ram.
- Mukesh Rawal as Vibhishana, Vishrava and Kaikesi's third son; Ravana, Kumbhakaran and Surpanakha's brother; King of Lanka.
- Aparajita Bhushan as Mandodari, Ravan's first wife; Mayasura and Apsara Hema's daughter; Mayavi and Dundubhi's sister; Meghanaad, and Akshayakumara's mother.
- Mulraj Rajda as Janaka, Kushadhwaja's brother; Sunaina's husband; Sita and Urmila's father, Mandavi and Shrutkirti's uncle King of Mithila
- Urmila Bhatt as Sunayana, Janak's wife; Sita and Urmila's mother, Mandavi and Shrutkirti's aunt, Queen of Mithila
- Shyam Sundar Kalani as Sugriva Sugriva-Vali's brother; Ruma's husband. Also Vali, Sugriva's brother and also played role of Yamraj God of death.
- Sudhir Dalvi as Vasishtha, Raghukul brothers' teacher
- Chandrashekhar Vaidya as Sumantra, Dasharatha's minister
- Renu Dhariwal as Shurpanakha, Vishrava and Kaikesi's daughter; Ravana, Kumbhakaran and Vibhishan's sister. Her nose was cut off by Lakshman.
- Radha Yadav as Tara, Vali's wife and Angad's mother
- Rajshekar Upadhyay as Jambvanta
- Bashir Khan as Angad, Tara and Vali's son / Vajramushti (Lankan General)
- Vijay Kavish as Shiva, Parvati's husband
- Mayasura, Mandodari's father, Ravan's father in law
- Maharshi Valmiki, author of Ramayan
- Pushpa Verma as Sulochana, Meghanaad's wife, Sheshnaag and Nagalakshmi's daughter
- Ramesh Chapaneri as Malyavan and Agastya
- Chandrakant Pandey as Nishad
- Girish Seth as Nal, Neel's brother, Gandharva
- Giriraj Shukla as Neel, Nal's brother, Prahasta
- Vibhuti Dave as Trijata, Sita's caretaker
- Sarita Devi as Shabari, Ram's devotee
- Aslam Khan as Samudra Dev and various roles
- Bandini Mishra as Parvati, Shiva's wife
- Murari Lal Gupta as Akampana.
- Mahesh Bhatt as Shatanand, Ahilya Devi & Gauatam Rishi's son, priest of Janak
- Shrikant Soni as Vishwamitra
- Kaustubh Trivedi as Kewat
- Bhushan Lakandari as Vishnu
- Sunil Verma as Garuda/Indra/Jatayu/Narantak
- Ramesh Goyal as Maarich
- Kapil Kumar as Akshayakumara, Ravan and Mandodari's Second son; Meghnath's brother
- Madhu Priya as Apsara Avtar of Shurpanakha
- Rajendra Jain as Kalanemi
- Mayuresh Kshetramhade as Luv, Ram and Sita's younger son; Kush's twin
- Swapnil Joshi as Kush, Ram and Sita's elder son; Luv's twin
- Randhir Singh as Viradh, Rakshas, Sursa, Atikaye
- Dinesh Anand as Maharshi Durvasa

== Episodes ==
Episode No.	Title	Air Date
1	Birth and childhood of Lord Ram	25 January 1987
2	Ram going to Gurukul	1 February 1987
3	Continuing Gurukul	8 February 1987
4	Vishwamitra comes to Ayodhya and Ram kills Taraka Rakshasi	15 February 1987
5	Ganga Redemption of Ahilya	22 February 1987
6	Ram meets Sita	1 March 1987
7	Sita's Swayamvara	8 March 1987
8	Sita's Swayamvara and Parashuram	15 March 1987
9	Marriage Preparations	22 March 1987
10	Ram and Sita's Marriage	29 March 1987
11	Sita's arrival at Ayodhya	5 April 1987
12	Discussion on Dasharatha's heir	12 April 1987
13	Manthra poisons Kaikeyi's mind	19 April 1987
14	Kaikeyi Demands Her Boons from Dasharatha	26 April 1987
15	Shri Ram, Sita and Lakshman preparing for the Journey to the Forest	3 May 1987
16	Shri Ram, Sita and Lakshman leave Ayodhya	10 May 1987
17	Shri Ram, Sita and Lakshman meet Nishadraj Guha	17 May 1987
18	Bharadwaja's Ashram	24 May 1987
19	Valmiki's Ashram and Chitrakoot	31 May 1987
20	King Dasharath's Death and story of Shravan Kumar	7 June 1987
21	Bharath Returns to Ayodhya	14 June 1987
22	Bharath rejects to become King	21 June 1987
23	Bharat vows to bring back Shri Ram	28 June 1987
24	Reunion of Ram and Bharat	5 July 1987
25	Bharath returns to Ayodhya with Shri Ram's sandals	12 July 1987
26	Shri Ram's sandals installed on the throne of Ayodhya	19 July 1987
27	Shri Ram, Sita and Lakshman meet Sage Atri & Mother Anusuya	26 July 1987
28	Shri Ram vows to destroy demons, meets Sage Agastya	2 August 1987
29	First meeting with Jatayu	9 August 1987
30	Shurpanaka Encounter	16 August 1987
31	Sita Kidnap Plan by Raavan	23 August 1987
32	Sita Haran and Ravana kills Jatayu	30 August 1987
33	Shri Ram & Lakshman meet wounded Jatayu	6 September 1987
34	Shri Ram & Lakshman encounter Kabandh and reach Shabari's ashram	13 September 1987
35	Hanuman meets Shri Ram	20 September 1987
36	Friendship between Shri Ram & Sugriv	27 September 1987
37	Sugriv tells Shri Ram about Bali	4 October 1987
38	Shri Ram kills Bali	11 October 1987
39	Sugriv becomes king	18 October 1987
40	Sugriv and Angad come to Shri Ram for his blessings	25 October 1987
41	Lakshman enters Kishikindha in a fury	1 November 1987
42	Search for Sita begins	8 November 1987
43	Jambubant reminds Hanuman of his dormant strength. Hanuman flies to Lanka	15 November 1987
44	Hanuman meets Sita in Ashok Vatika	22 November 1987
45	Hanuman ravages Ashok Vatika and kills Akshay Kumara	29 November 1987
46	Hanuman meets Ravana and Lanka Dahan	6 December 1987
47	Hanuman takes leave of Sita	13 December 1987
48	Hanuman returns and tells Shri Ram about Sita	20 December 1987
49	Vibhishana is expelled from Lanka	27 December 1987
50	Vibhishana meets Shri Ram	3 January 1988
51	Sukh meets Sugriv	10 January 1988
52	Ram Setu bandhan	17 January 1988
53	The construction of the bridge is completed	24 January 1988
54	Shri Ram's arrow fells Ravan's crown	31 January 1988
55	Ravana and Sugriv duel against each other	7 February 1988
56	Shri Ram sends Angad as a peace ambassador to Ravan's court	14 February 1988
57	Angad's challenge	21 February 1988
58	Mandodari appeals to Ravan to listen to the advice of his elders	28 February 1988
59	Battle Starts	6 March 1988
60	Ravan comes to the battlefield	13 March 1988
61	Kumbhakaran is woken up	20 March 1988
62	Kumbhakaran vadh	27 March 1988
63	Devantak, Narantak, Trishira and other warriors are killed	3 April 1988
64	Lakshman fights and kills Atikaya	10 April 1988
65	Shri Ram & Lakshman are bound by Indrajit's Nagapasha	17 April 1988
66	Garuda frees Shri Ram and Lakshman from Nagapasha	24 April 1988
67	Lakshman get injured by Indrajit's 'shakti' weapon	1 May 1988
68	Hanuman brings Sushen Vaidya	8 May 1988
69	Hanuman brings Sanjeevani mountain from Himalayas and Lakshman is cured	15 May 1988
70	Indrajit goes to perform a tantrik yajna	22 May 1988
71	Indrajit Vadh	29 May 1988
72	Ravana enters battlefield and fights Shri Ram	5 June 1988
73	Ravan attacks Shri Ram	12 June 1988
74	Indra sends his chariot for Shri Ram	19 June 1988
75	Ravan vadh and end of battle	26 June 1988
76	Sita Agni-pariksha	3 July 1988
77	Shri Ram heads for Ayodhya	10 July 1988
78	The coronation of Shri Ram	31 July 1988

== Production ==
=== Background ===
For centuries, the Ramcharitmanas had been performed in northern India through pāṭh (ritualized recitation), kathā (oral exposition), and Ramlila (seasonal dramatic renactments). Religious films had previously enjoyed success in India; in contrast for decades Doordarshan, India's state-owned public television broadcaster, generally aired dull programming meant to serve as a service to the nation rather than personal entertainment. In the 1980s, the advent of commercials (deliberately designed to attract viewer attention) and the commission of serialized dramas attracted greater viewership. Ramanand Sagar had previously produced Vikram Aur Betaal for Doordarshan, a series based on folktales from Vetala Panchavimshati.

=== Development ===
Ramayan was regarded as the most expensive TV show produced during the time with a budget ₹9 lakhs per episode.

Writing for the Indian Express upon completion of the airing of the series' final episode, former bureaucrat S. S. Gill wrote that it was during his tenure as the secretary with the Ministry of Information and Broadcasting in September 1985 that he contacted Ramanand Sagar in association with the project. He added that in a letter to Sagar, he had written about the Ramayana as a subject for the television series was ideal in that it was "a repository of moral and social values" and that its message was "secular and universal". He further wrote that he had noted in the letter that Sagar's "real challenge would lie in seeing the epic "with the eyes of a modern man and relating its message to the spiritual and emotional needs of our age". Gill recalled that he had written a similar letter to B. R. Chopra over the production of the series Mahabharat based on another epic of the same name, and mentioned that both Sagar and he accepted his suggestions and constituted panels of experts and scholars to conceptualize the production.

The series was initially conceptualized to run for 52 episodes of 45 minutes each. But, owing to popular demand it had to be extended thrice, eventually ending after 78 episodes.

Initially, Both Ramayan and Mahabharat was planned to air together, but later it was decided to air Ramayan first which was followed by Mahabharat after its end.

=== Casting ===
I remember I had given an audition for Ram and I failed initially. I don’t know what happened. The photoshoot happened with the look and make-up but I wasn’t looking like Lord Ram... Then we thought of adding a smile and then everything got sorted.

— Arun Govil

Govil expressed his desire to play Rama and appeared for a screen test. Initially, he was considered to be inappropriate for the role. He then appeared for the screen test again wearing a smile on his face and got finalized for the role. Since Govil's collaboration with Debashree Roy in Kanak Mishra's Jiyo To Aise Jiyo (1981) was adulated, the actress was approached to play Sita but due to her hectic schedule in Bengali cinema, she failed to appear for the screen test.

Several other famous actresses were approached as well but all of them backed off due to the prevalent premonition that playing the role of Lady Sita would blemish their romantic appeal resulting doom to their on-screen career. Deepika Chikhalia was then summoned to appear for the screen test. She had to undergo rigorous screen tests and was finalized then.

Sanjay Jog was originally approached for the role of Lakshmana but he refused since he was unable to give bulk dates. Sagar then urged him to play Bharata since the role would not require bulk dates. The role of Lakshmana then went to Sunil Lahiri.

Arvind Trivedi went to audition for the role of a boatman where Ramanand Sagar chose him as Ravan. However, when Trivedi rejected the offer, Paresh Rawal convinced him for playing the role. Vijay Kavish played three roles in the series which were Shiva, Valmiki and Mayasura.

== Broadcast ==
=== Original run ===
In India, the series was originally broadcast on DD National from 25 January 1987 to 31 July 1988. Viewership rose steadily in the first view months, and soon was earning advertising revenues greater than any show had previously done, earning roughly Rs. 2,800,000-3,000,000 a week. It is estimated the maximum viewership reached 80 to 100 million, nearly an eighth of India's population, a large proportion at a time when television access was greatly limited in India. Its massive popularity was termed "Ramayana Fever", with streets being emptied and business coming to a halt every Sunday when an episode premiered at 9:30 AM.

=== Rereleases ===
Reruns of the series aired on Star Plus and Star Utsav in 2000s. It was re-telecast again between March and April 2020 during the 2020 coronavirus lockdown in India on DD National and broke all records for viewership globally for any TV show. Hundreds of millions of viewers have watched the series during the 2020 coronavirus lockdown in India.

DD National said on 16 April 2020 the show created a world record: 77 million people watched the show in one day. It was again telecasted on StarPlus from 4 May 2020. The show is dubbed in Kannada, Marathi, Bengali, Telugu and Tamil which aired on Star Suvarna, Star Pravah, Star Jalsha, Star Maa and Star Vijay respectively. BBC recorded that it had a viewership of 82 percent, highest viewership in the world.

== Reception and legacy ==
He added, “Starting at around 50 percent the 80 percent figure was reached within a few months and never went down. The viewership was more than 50 percent even in the predominantly non-Hindi speaking southern Indian States of Andhra Pradesh, Kerala and Karnataka. The show's popularity spanned across religions and people of the Islam faith watched in high numbers as well. It was common among people threatening to burn down the local electricity board headquarters during a power outage."

The success of the series was documented well by the media. Soutik Biswas of BBC recalled that when the series was telecast every Sunday morning, "streets would be deserted, shops would be closed and people would bathe and garland their TV sets before the serial began."

Writing for the Telegraph, William Dalrymple noted, "In villages across south Asia, hundreds of people would gather around a single set to watch the gods and demons play out their destinies. In the noisiest and most bustling cities, trains, buses and cars came to a sudden halt, and a strange hush fell over the bazaars. In Delhi, government meetings had to be rescheduled after the entire cabinet failed to turn up for an urgent briefing."

=== Critical response ===
The series was generally criticised in the English-language press for an exceedingly slow narrative, certain choices regarding costume and set design, and poor special effects. English-language critics frequently viewed Sagar as crudely commercialising the "literary treasure" that was the Ramayana. Lutgendorf notes that such critics were often culturally disconnected from traditional renactments of the Ramayana from which Sagar took inspiration, and who rather were accustomed to the conventions of Western film. Hindi-language critics were less critical regarding the pacing.

=== Political ===
Regarding initial apprehensions about the series being aired by a government-owned broadcaster, its hitherto producer Sharad Dutt said that "a lot of people within the channel's office weren't supportive of the idea, to begin with. But it had no motivation with what was going on politically. The Congress was in power and it had no agenda of the sort.". Sharma noted that the political clout the series held could be adjudged by the fact that Sagar and Arun Govil (who played Rama) "were repeatedly courted by both the Congress and the BJP to campaign for them." Arun Govil, Deepika Chikhalia (Sita), and Arvind Trivedi (Ravana) all went on to become members of parliament for the Bharatiya Janata Party.

Arvind Rajagopal in his book Politics After Television: Hindu Nationalism and the Reshaping of the Public in India (2000) wrote that with the series, the government "violated a decades-old taboo on religious partisanship, and Hindu nationalists made the most of the opportunity." It confirmed to the idea of Hindu awakening and the rise of the Bharatiya Janata Party capitalizing on this."

Manik Sharma of Hindustan Times voiced similar views in that the series "played in the backdrop of a Hindutva shift in Indian politics, under the aegis of the Rashtriya Swayamsevak Sangh (RSS) and its political outfit, the Bharatiya Janata Party (BJP). While the media and cultural commentators struggled to consider Sagar's epic one way or the other, there were some who saw it as a catalyst, even if unintended, to the turmoil that the movement resulted in."

In Punjab and Haryana, there were sporiadic instances of Sikh terrorism against audiences of Ramayan.

The series was set to end with the coronation of Ram and thus omit the contents of the Uttarakāṇḍa, which feature Valmiki educating Ram's sons. Sanitation workers, who belonged to traditionally untouchable communities that call themselves Balmiks and claim descent from Valmiki, went on strike to agitate for the extension of the serial. The movement was successful, leading to the production of Luv Kush.

The series was re-telecast from 28 March 2020 with one hour episode during the morning and one hour episode during the night during the lockdown of 21 days due to coronavirus on DD National.

=== Scholarly ===
Sagar innovated many story elements in the serial that hitherto had not existed in any Ramayana or had only received cursory treatment. This includes a fleshed out coverage of Ram's childhood and education, new story elements on Kaikeyi and her redemption, and humanized rakshasas who are depicted as "majestic but flawed". Lutgendorf states such innovations were developed in accordance with Sagar's and his modern audience's sensibilities but remained within the limits of traditional themes.

=== Religious ===
The serial elicited a strong religious response from its audience in what has been termed "video-latry"; viewers performed puja of their television sets and prostrated before Govil and Chikhlia. English-language critics derided such practices as a backwards "embarrassment", but such practices were rooted in the pre-existing customs of puja worship of modern mechanical devices, sanctification rites surrounding the performance of religious drama, and the traditional identification of actors with their roles. Indian intellectuals regarded the serial as promoting the intellectual passivity of its audience, but according to Lutgendorf the audience actively engaged with the show via religious rites and critical discussion. Indian intellectuals also bemoaned that the Ramayan serial would spell a death knell for folk recensions as the serial would be considered a standard authoritative edition. According to Lutgendorf, such worries may be overstated, and notes the irony in that urban intellectuals were among the least likely to appreciate and patronise folk performances.

== Ratings ==
Week and year	BARC viewership (Hindi GEC overall)		BARC viewership (Hindi GEC free)		BARC viewership (Hindi GEC pay)		BARC viewership (Hindi GEC rural)		BARC viewership (Hindi GEC urban)		Ref.
Week and year	Impressions (millions)	Ranking	Impressions (millions)	Ranking	Impressions (millions)	Ranking	Impressions (millions)	Ranking	Impressions (millions)	Ranking	Ref.
Week 14 of 2020	61397	1	—N/a				27169	1	34228	1	
Week 15 of 2020	67473	1	—N/a				30619	1	36854	1	
Week 16 of 2020	68687	1	17693	1	50994	1	30887	1	37800	1	

Ramayan notably broke viewership for any Indian television series during that time. It was telecast in 55 countries and at a total viewership of 650 million and re-telecast (24 March - 18 April 2020) nearly 2500 million viewership alone in 25 days, it became the highest watched Indian television series by a distance, and one of top watched television series in world. It entered in the Limca Book of Records as the most watched historical series. On its first telecast (1987), it had 40 million viewership in India. That brought ₹23 crore revenue for the channel.

The viewership during lockdown garnered record highest ratings for a Hindi GEC (general entertainment channel) show since 2015 making DD National as the most watched Indian channel since its premiere.

Ramayan garnered a total of 170 million viewers in first 4 shows during which DD National became the most watched Indian television channel after many years. The following week it garnered 580 million impressions in morning slot and 835 million impressions in night slot.

During week 14 of 2020, it garnered 61.397 million impressions and the following week it got 67.4 million impressions.

== Sequel and remake ==
A follow-up series Luv Kush based on the last chapter of Ramayana Uttara Kanda, aired in October 1988 on DD National. A remake series Ramayan produced by Sagar Arts aired on NDTV Imagine in 2008.

== Footnotes ==
- Karp, Jonathan and Williams, Michael. "Reigning Hindu TV Gods of India Have Viewers Glued to Their Sets." The Wall Street Journal, 22 April 1998
- Lutgendorf, Philip (1991). The Life of a Text: Performing the Ramcharitmanas of Tulsidas. Berkeley, California: University of California Press. ISBN 0-520-06690-1.
- Lutgendorf, Philip (Summer 1990). "Ramayan: The Video". TDR/The Drama Review. 34 (2). The MIT Press. doi:10.2307/1146030. ISSN 1054-2043. JSTOR 1146030.
- Lutgendorf, Philip (2006). "All in the (Raghu) Family: A Video Epic in Cultural Context". In Hawley, John Stratton; Narayanan, Vasudha (eds.). The Life of Hinduism. The Life of Religion. Berkeley: University of California Press. pp. 140–157. ISBN 978-0-520-24913-4.
- National Endowment for the Humanities. "Lessons of the Epics: The Ramayana". EdSITEment Lesson Plans. Available online from Lessons of the Indian Epics: The Ramayana: Showing your Dharma (18 January 2006).
- Rajagopal, Arvind (2001). Politics After Television: Hindu Nationalism and the Reshaping of the Public in India. Cambridge University Press. ISBN 9780521648394.
