= Aaj Ki Taaza Khabar =

- Poster
- Directed by: Rajendra Bhatia
- Written by: Mulraj Rajda
- Produced by: Rajendra Bhatia
- Starring: Kiran Kumar; Radha Saluja; I. S. Johar; Asrani
- Music by: Shankar Jaikishan
- Release date: 24 August 1973
- Country: India
- Language: Hindi

Aaj Ki Taaza Khabar (transl. Today's breaking news) is a 1973 Indian comedy film directed by Rajendra Bhatia. Its stars Kiran Kumar and Radha Saluja. This film was adapted from a Gujarati play Chakdol and later remade in Marathi as Pheka Pheki (1989) and in Hindi as Golmaal Returns (2008).

== Plot ==
Sunil Mehta is stuck in a giant ferris wheel with an attractive young woman due to a power failure. He arrives home the next day, and meets a very suspicious wife, Geeta, who knows that he has been up to no good. She refuses to believe his story about the stalled ferris wheel, and he invents a story about spending the night with a fictitious friend named Champak Bhumia. Geeta does not believe that he ever has a friend by that name, and decides to write to him to come and visit her. Sunil then convinces his friend, Amit Desai, to pretend that he is Champak, and thus convince Geeta that he was indeed telling the truth. Amit agrees to do so, and everything goes according to plan - until a real and amorous Champak Bhumia shows up - resulting in hilarious chaos.

== Cast ==
- Radha Saluja as Geeta Mehta
- Kiran Kumar as Sunil Mehta
- I. S. Johar as Ramji
- Asrani as Champak Bhumia/Amit Desai
- Manju Bansal as Kesari Desai
- Paintal as Champak Bhumia
- Padma Khanna as Motiyah Bhumia
- Narendra Nath as Capt. Ranjeet Goel
- Arpana Choudhary as Pinky
- Helen as Woman at party
- Arvind Trivadi
- Jayshree T.
- Mehmood
- H.L. Pardeshi
- Parvesh Sawhney
- Fatima
- Sushil Bhatnagar
- Khairati

== Soundtrack ==
All songs were penned by Hasrat Jaipuri.

Song	Singer
"Mujhe Meri Biwi Se Bachao"	Kishore Kumar
"Raat Hai, Baat Hai"	Kishore Kumar
"Aataa Aayig Kaye Ye Mard Bade Bade Bedardi Hai"	Kishore Kumar, Usha Mangeshkar
"Khilta Hua Shabab Hai"	Asha Bhosle
"Happy Birthday To Pinky"	Asha Bhosle

== Awards and nominations ==
Year	Award	Category	Recipient(s)	Result
1974	Filmfare Awards	Best Film	Rajendra Bhatia	Nominated
1974	Filmfare Awards	Best Director	Rajendra Bhatia	Nominated
1974	Filmfare Awards	Best Story	Mulraj Rajda	Nominated
1974	Filmfare Awards	Best Performance in a Comic Role	I. S. Johar	Nominated
1974	Filmfare Awards	Best Performance in a Comic Role	Asrani	Won
