= A Daughter's Tale Pankh =

- Directed by: Premraaj; Rajinder Verma
- Written by: Rajinder Verma
- Produced by: Rajinder Verma
- Starring: Nishigandha Wad; Mehul Buch; Sudhir Pandey; Surbhi Kakkar; Ayush Shah
- Cinematography: Ajay Arya
- Edited by: Premraaj
- Music by: Mahesh
- Production company: Yash babu Entertainment
- Release date: 17 November 2017
- Running time: 137 minutes
- Country: India
- Language: Hindi

A Daughter's Tale Pankh is an Bollywood action-drama film directed by and produced by Rajinder Verma. Directed by Premraaj & Rajinder Verma under the banner of Yash babu Entertainment. The film was released worldwide on 17 November 2017 and grossed more than (INR). It has generally received positive reviews from critics. The principal locations of the shoot were Mumbai, Delhi, Kurukshetra and Haryana. The production was done under the guidance of IAS of Kurukshetra, Mrs. Sumedha Kataria, and Special Correspondent of The Pioneer, Mr. Sourabh Chowdhury. The story and screenplay are written by Rajinder Verma. It features actor Dr. Nishigandha Wad, Mehul Buch, Sudhir Pandey, Surbhi Kakkar, Amarjeet Singh, Vipin Goyal, Sonam Arora & Ayush Shah. Music of the film was composed by Mahesh.

== Cast ==
- Nishigandha Wad
- Mehul Buch
- Sudhir Pandey
- Virendra Singh
- Surbhi Kakkar
- Ragini Dixit
- Pooja Dixit
- Paruk Kaushik
- Sonam Arora
- Aakash sharma
- Rahul Jaittly
- Sunil Lahri
- Amarjeet Singh Tumber
- Chunar Verma
- Sourabh Chowdhury
- Gayatri Kaushal
- Sumedha Kataria
- Premraaj
- Ayush Shah
- Rahuul Chuwdhary
- Sunil Kumar Tinna
- Vipin Pandey
- Sadiq Abbas rizvi
- Santy Nirwana
