= Baharon Ke Manzil (1991 film) =

- Poster
- Directed by: Madhava Rao
- Based on: Pudhu Vasantham (Tamil)
- Produced by: P.Subba Rao
- Starring: Mona Ambegaonkar; Roopesh Kothari; Jeet Upendra; Rakesh Bedi; Reema Lagoo; Sunil Lahri; Alok Nath; Paresh Rawal; Satish Shah; Ajit Vachani
- Music by: Raamlaxman
- Release date: 23 August 1991
- Running time: 135 min.
- Language: Hindi

Baharon Ke Manzil (transl. Blossoming stage) is a 1991 Indian Hindi-language film directed by Madhava Rao and produced by P.Subba Rao for P.S.R.Pictures, Madras, starring Mona Ambegaonkar, Roopesh Kothari, Jeet Upendra and Paresh Rawal.

== Plot ==
Baharon Ke Manzil is a musical film, the story of an unusual friendship between a girl and 4 upcoming musicians.

== Cast ==
- Mona Ambegaonkar as Asha
- Roopesh Kothari
- Jeet Upendra
- Rakesh Bedi
- Reema Lagoo
- Sunil Lahri
- Alok Nath
- Paresh Rawal
- Satish Shah
- Ajit Vachani

== Soundtrack ==
Baharon Ke Manzil

Film score by Raamlaxman
- Released: 1991
- Genre: Feature film soundtrack
- Length: 54:09
- Label: Tips

The music was composed by Raamlaxman.

| No. | Song | Singers | Lyrics | Duration |
|---|---|---|---|---|
| 1 | Sabse Badi Dosti... | Poornima, Udit Narayan, Kumar Sanu, Suresh Wadkar | Dev Kohli | 6:30 |
| 2 | O Cinemawalo... | Amit Kumar | Shaam Anuraghi | 7:04 |
| 3 | Meri Jaan Duaa Karna... | Poornima, Udit Narayan | Dev Kohli | 6:44 |
| 4 | Tera Naam Likh Diya... | Poornima, Udit Narayan | Ravindra Rawal | 8:56 |
| 5 | Tak Dhin Tak Dhin... | Suresh Wadkar, Udit Narayan, Kumar Sanu | Dev Kohli | 5:50 |
| 6 | Tum Tana Na Tana... | Poornima, Amit Kumar | Dev Kohli | 6:55 |
| 7 | O My Sweetheart... | Poornima, Udit Narayan | Ravindra Rawal | 5:35 |
| 8 | Aaj Purane Saal Ka... | Suresh Wadkar & Chorus | Gauhar Kanpuri | 5:35 |
