= Luv Kush =

Indian epic television series

- Also known as: Uttar Ramayan
- Genre: Epic
- Created by: Ramanand Sagar
- Based on: Uttara Kanda
- Directed by: Ramanand Sagar
- Starring: Arun Govil; Dipika Chikhlia; Sunil Lahiri; Dara Singh; Swapnil Joshi; Mayuresh Kshetramade
- Country of origin: India
- Original language: Hindi
- No. of seasons: 1
- No. of episodes: 39

Production
- Producer: Ramanand Sagar
- Camera setup: Multi-camera
- Running time: 30 minutes
- Production company: Sagar Films

Original release
- Network: DD National
- Release: 29 October 1988 – 26 March 1989

Related
- Ramayan (1987 TV series)

Luv Kush (originally called Uttar Ramayan) is an Indian television series that ran from 1988 to 1989. It was created, written, produced, and directed by Ramanand Sagar. It is a follow-up Ramayan, featuring mostly the same cast and production crew. Luv Kush covers the last book — the Uttarakāṇḍa — of the ancient Indian epic Ramayana, following Rama's coronation, especially focusing on his children, twins Kusha and Lava.

Amid the Coronavirus lockdown, all 39 episodes of this show were re-telecasted on DD National channel following Ramayan from 19 April 2020 to 2 May 2020.

== Plot ==
Luv Kush is a follow-up series of Ramayan and is based on the Uttara Kanda, which is the last chapter of Ramayana. It depicts the lives of Luv and Kush, the twin sons of Rama and Sita.

After Ram's coronation, he gets to know about Sita's pregnancy and the citizens of Ayodhya gossiping her character as she was forced to Live in Lanka. He trusts his wife and decides to leave that matter but Sita gets to know about this and tells Ram to abandon her is his duty as a king and she decides to leave to the forests. His brother Lakshman protests this but in vain and leaves her in the forest where she meets Rishi Valmiki who was composing Ramayana, the life incident of Rama. Rishi Valmiki accepts her as his daughter. She is provided shelter in his ashram. On the other hand, Ram is missing Sita and King Janaka (Sita's father) visits him and he gets to know that Sita's mother Sunayana has fallen ill after getting the news of her daughter's abandonment. Ram visits Mithila and apologize to her.

After coming back to Ayodhya, many sages complain about the tyrant King of Madhupur, Lavanasur and Ram sends his brother Shatrughna to kill him. On his way to Madhupur, he meets Sage Valmiki in ashram where Sita was living under incognito. He unknowingly performs the naming ceremony of his nephews Luv and Kush. He succeeded in slaying Lavanasur and is crowned as King of Madhupur.

As the years pass by, Luv and Kush are trained under Rishi Valmiki and are taught Ramayan by them. Kush always had a question in mind about why Ram abandoned Sita, not knowing that Sita is none other than his own mother as they knew her by the name Vandevi. 12 years later, Ram conducts an Ashvamedh Yagna and the horse is stopped by them as they wanted to know the answer to their questions. They fight with Lakshman, Bharat and Shatrughan and finally are about to fight with their father when Valmiki interrupts and ends the fight. In the evening they visit Sita and tells them about the days incident and Sita tells them that Ram is their father. They travel to Ayodhya singing the verses of Ramayan and make the citizens realise their mistake of doubting Devi Sita. Rama is eager to listen to the epic Ramayana. He invites Luv and Kush to his palace and listens to them along with his family and other courtiers. It is when he realises that both of them are his sons whereas citizens of Ayodhya still asks to prove Sita's character. Sita is called and Ram asks her to give the proof. Sita decides to give the last proof and calls her birth mother Bhumi Devi (the Earth goddess) and went away with her leaving Luv and Kush with their father.

Years later, Rama crowns his sons and nephews in different parts of Kosala and takes Jal Samadhi along with his brothers.

== Cast ==
- Arun Govil as Rama, 7th Incarnation of Vishnu; King of Ayodhya
- Dipika Chikhlia as Sita, Reincarnation of Lakshmi; Ram's wife
- Swapnil Joshi as Kusha, Ram and Sita's elder son
- Mayuresh Kshetramade as Luv, Ram and Sita's younger son
- Sunil Lahri as Lakshman, Ram's third younger brother; Reincarnation of Sheshanag
- Sanjay Jog as Bharat, Ram's second brother; Reincarnation of Vishnu's Shankha
- Sameer Rajda as Shatrughna; Reincarnation of Vishnu's Sudarshan Chakra; Ram's youngest brother
- Jayshree Gadkar as Kausalya; Ram's mother; King Dasrath's chief consort
- Padma Khanna as Kaikeyi; Bharat's mother; King Dasrath's second queen
- Rajni Bala as Sumitra; Lakshman and Shatrughan's mother
- Anjali Vyas as Urmila; Lakshman's wife, Sita's younger sister
- Sulakshana Khatri as Mandavi; Bharat's wife; Sita's cousin
- Poonam Shetty as Shrutakirti; Shatrughan's wife; Mandavi's younger sister
- Dara Singh as Hanuman; Ram's devotee
- Mukesh Rawal as Vibhishan; Ravan's brother who supported Ram
- Shyam Sunder Kalani as Sugriva; King of Kishkindha
- Sudhir Dalvi as Vasishtha; teacher of Rama
- Chandrashekhar as Sumanta; King Dasrath's minister
- Rajshekhar Upadhyay as Jamvanta
- Vijay Kavish as Valmiki / Shiva; Devi Parvati's consort
- Vilas Raj as Lavanasura; Former King of Madhupura, nephew of Ravan; slayed by Shatrughan
- Mulraj Rajda as Janak; Sita and Urmila's father; Mandavi and Shrutakirti's uncle
- Urmila Bhatt as Sunaina; Sita and Urmila's mother; Mandavi and Shrutakirti's aunt
- Aslam Khan as various characters
- Bhushan Lakandari as Vishnu; The protector of Universe who reincarnated as Ram

== Episodes ==
No.	Title
1	"Hanuman tearing chest and showing image of Ram and Sita"
2	"Ram forgives Manthara"
3	"Story of Garuda and Kagbhusandi"
4	"Narada narrates the story of Ram to Maharishi Valmiki"
5	"Brahma inspires Maharishi Valmiki to compose Ramayana"
6	"Ram sends secret messengers to survey his kingdom"
7	"Ram-Kagbhusandi Leela"
8	"Ram meets all Sages in his court"
9	"Ram surveys his kingdom in disguised form"
10	"Ram is saddened to know his subjects' thoughts about Sita"
11	"Sita decides to leave Ayodhya"
12	"Sita leaves for exile"
13	"Maharishi Valmiki takes Sita in his Ashram"
14	"Ram meets Janak"
15	"Ram goes to Mithila"
16	"Story of Durvasa telling about Ram's future"
17	"Shatrughna becomes king of Madhura, resolves to kill Lavanasur"
18	"Birth of Luv and Kush"
19	"Shatrughna leaves for Madhura"
20	"Story of Mandhata"
21	"Lavanasur Vadh"
22	"Shatrughna's coronation"
23	"Agastya Muni gives a divine gift to Ram"
24	"Maharishi begins education of Luv and Kush"
25	"Luv-Kush and Nagraj"
26	"Proposal of Ashwamedha yagna"
27	"Luv Kush's Kundalini awakened"
28	"Ram refuses to have second marriage"
29	"Valmiki gives knowledge of shastras and astras to Luv and Kush"
30	"Inauguration of Ashwamedha yagna"
31	"Luv-Kush seize the horse"
32	"Luv defeats Shatrughna"
33	"Luv-Kush defeat Lakshman"
34	"Luv-Kush defeat Bharat and Sugriv"
35	"Valmiki stops Ram from fighting Luv-Kush"
36	"Luv-Kush narrate story of Ramayana in the court"
37	"Ram asks for proof"
38	"Sita gave the proof of her chastity and got into the lap of the earth."
39	"Shree Ram Jal-Samadhi and end of the story"

== Production ==
Originally, Ramanand Sagar's plan was to end Ramayan with the return of Sita from exile. However on the demand from Valmiki Samaj and PMO, Sagar made the series as Ramayan's follow up.

== Reception ==
During the premiere of the series during the Covid-19 lockdown following Ramayan on 19 April 2020, the viewership increased to a greater extent compared to Ramayan and received 18.493 million impressions during the morning slot and 48.553 million impressions during the night slot however being the most-watched Indian television program.
