= Ram Sethi =

Indian actor

- Born: 15 November 1938 (age 87); Delhi, British India
- Other names: Pyarelal
- Occupations: Actor; Film producer; Television presenter
- Years active: 1960–present
- Children: 2

Ram Sethi (born 15 November 1938), also known as Pyarelal, is an Indian actor who works in the Bollywood industry. Sethi has worked in many films as a main or supporting character in his long career of 6 decades.

== Biography ==
Ram Sethi (Pyarelal) entered the Indian film industry in 1969, and started off his career as an assistant to Ravi Tandon. After doing some free-lance work, he joined Prakash Mehra, and was employed as his right-hand man for over 20 years. Here he did many projects with actors like Amitabh Bachchan, Jeetendra, Shashi Kapoor, Vinod Khanna, Raaj Kumar, Anil Kapoor, Sanjay Dutt, Sridevi, Smita Patil, Parveen Babi, Pran, Amjad Khan and many other new actors.

He has worked as an actor/writer/director for many movies in the last 46 years. Along with these skills, he also worked as an assistant director, screenplay writer, dialogue writer; and independently directed Ghungroo, starring Shashi Kapoor, Smita Patil, and Waheeda Rehman. He appeared in comical roles with Amitabh Bachchan in several films (Sethi's most notable appearances along with Bachchan include Namak Halaal, Zanjeer, Muqaddar Ka Sikandar and Kaalia).

He currently resides in Versova, Mumbai and is working as an actor, screenplay writer, consulting director and advisor for film-making.

== Filmography ==
- Rambhajjan Zindabaad (2017)
- P.K. (2014)
- Khelein Hum Jee Jaan Sey (2010) - Rehman Chacha
- Judwaa (1997) - Waiter
- Roop Ki Rani Choron Ka Raja (1993) - Abu Aslam Ghanvi
- Hum Nahin Sudharenge
- Tum Jiyo Hazaron Saal (2002) - Gangaram
- Shikaar (2000 film) - as Ram Shethi
- Deewana Mastana (1997) - Man asking for discount for train tickets
- Aurat Aurat Aurat (1996)
- Return of Jewel Thief (1996)
- Policewala Gunda (1995)- Damodar
- Hum Sab Chor Hain (1995) - Peter
- Guneghar (1995) - Mujahaideen
- Vartmaan (1995)
- Hum Hain Bemisaal (1994)
- Tahalka (1992) - Laurel (of Laurel and Hardy fame)
- Ranbhoomi (1991) - Pyarelal
- Jaan Ki Kasam (1991) - Mittal
- Baap Numbri Beta Dus Numbri - as postman
- Jaadugar (1989) - Pyarelal
- Hum To Chale Pardes (1988) - Dr. Sethi
- Sone Pe Suhaaga (1988) - Interviewer
- Imaandaar (1987) - C. C. Mathur
- Muqaddar Ka Faisla (1987) - Pyare Badshah
- Tan-Badan (1986) - Dinu
- Chameli Ki Shaadi (1986) - Natthulal
- Kabhie Ajnabi The (1985)
- Sweekar Kiya Maine (1983) - Chandu "Dahejiya"
- Ashanti (1982) - Police Inspector Mirza
- Gumsum (1982)
- Namak Halaal (1982) - Bhairon
- Yaarana (1981) - Etiquette Instructor
- Kaalia (1981) - Crippled Prisoner
- Laawaris (1981) - Harnaman
- Jiyo To Aise Jiyo (1981)
- Jwalamukhi (1980 film) - Chamanlal Pabara
- Red Rose (1980) - Murli Manohar - Manager
- Patita (1980) - Moti
- Do Aur Do Paanch (1980) - Pyarelal (Guest Appearance)
- Jhootha Kahin Ka (1979) - Hotel Waiter
- Hum Tere Ashiq Hain (1979) - Nawab Mirza Bahadur Dauliya
- Muqaddar Ka Sikandar (1978) - Pyarelal "Awara"
- Hera Pheri (1976) - The Casino Drunk
- Himalay Se Ooncha (1975) - Plane Passenger who tested the calling button
- Kasauti (1974) - Balu (Man who whistles at Sapna)
- Ek Kunwari Ek Kunwara (1973) - Tenant
- Hanste Zakhm (1973) - Ganesh
- Zanjeer (1973) - Constable
- Kala Parvat (1971) - Farmer
- Jewel Thief 1967

== Awards and nominations ==
- 1979 - Filmfare Award for Best Performance in a Comic Role - Muqaddar Ka Sikandar
- 2024 - Journalist Association of India Lifetime Achievement Award for Acting, Directing & Writing - presented in Delhi on 18 October 2024
