= Sameer Rajda =

Indian actor

- Born: 20 April 1963 (age 62); Mumbai, Maharashtra, India

Sameer Rajda is an Indian actor who works in the Gujarati cinema. He is the son of writer and director Mulraj Rajda.

== Filmography ==
=== Films ===
- Desh Re Joya Dada Pardesh Joya (1998)
- Jai Sikotar Maa (1998)
- Toran Badhao Ho Raaj (2003)

=== Television ===
Year	Show
1985	Vikram Aur Betaal
1986	Dada Dadi Ki Kahaniyan
1987-1988	Ramayan
1988	Mahabharat
1988-1989	Luv Kush
2008-2012	Hamari Devrani
2011-2013	Chhuta Chheda
2017–present	Crime Patrol
2017	Kuldeepak
