= Johnnie Walker (film) =

- Theatrical release poster
- Directed by: Jayaraj
- Screenplay by: Ranjith
- Story by: Jayaraj
- Produced by: Akshaya
- Starring: Mammootty
- Cinematography: S. Kumar
- Edited by: B. Lenin; V. T. Vijayan
- Music by: S. P. Venkitesh
- Distributed by: Mudra Arts
- Release date: 10 April 1992
- Running time: 143 minutes
- Country: India
- Language: Malayalam

Johnnie Walker is a 1992 Indian Malayalam-language action thriller film directed by Jayaraj and written by Ranjith. Mammootty appeared in the lead along with a set of youngsters. The story centres around a middle aged man who joins the same college that his younger brother studies at.

== Plot ==
Johnny Varghese, a 40 year old wealthy rancher, is fondly known as Johnnie Walker because of his preference for the alcohol brand of the same name, Johnnie Walker. He has a brother Bobby Varghese who studies in Bangalore for a degree in economics. A visit from his brother and friends changes Johnnie's mind and he joins college despite his age. From there he clashes with Samy who rules the college with his drug gang. Because of his love towards his brother Bobby, Johnny joins his college as a student and they start living together. Soon he becomes the hero of the college as well as rival to Samy and his gang. Bobby falls in love with his classmate Chandini, who is a depressed girl, as she is an adopted child to her parents. Chandini gets introduced to drugs by Samy and eventually gets hospitalised. Johnny has weakening eyesight and realizes that he will soon lose his vision completely; because of which he wants to get Bobby married and pleads Chandini's parents for the same. They agree after hearing about his predicament. On the night of the wedding, Bobby is killed by Samy and his gang. When Johnny learns of his brother's death, he kills Samy and Didi, the leader of the gang. In the end, Johnny loses his sight completely, meets with an accident and dies.

== Cast ==
- Mammootty as Johny Varghese
- Ranjitha as Mridula, lecturer
- Kamal Gaur as Samy the drug dada of college
- Jeet Upendra as Bobby Varghese
- Rani as Chandini
- Maniyanpilla Raju as Professor Zachariah
- Sankaradi as Principal Padmanabhan
- Prem Kumar as Charlie, Bobby's friend
- Gopal Poojari as Diri
- Thrissur Elsy as Hostel Warden
- Sukumari as Mridula's mother
- Abu Salim
- Augustine as Vivek, Drug mafia member
- Hakim Rawther as Rajiv, Drug mafia member
- Kuthiravattom Pappu as Father Antony
- Prem Prakash as Coach Mohana Krishan
- Jagathi Sreekumar as Ajayan, Police Constable
- Soman as Doctor Bhargavan
- T. S. Krishnan as Hassan
- T. P. Madhavan as Kannan, Chandini's father
- Robin Verghese as Shelly
- Neelakandan Natrajan as Kuttappayi

== Music ==
All lyrics are written by Gireesh Puthenchery; all music is composed by S. P. Venkatesh.

| No. | Title | Artist(s) | Length |
|---|---|---|---|
| 1. | "Poo Mariyil" | K. J. Yesudas, K. S. Chithra |
| 2. | "Shanthamee Ratriyil" | K. J. Yesudas |
| 3. | "Minnum Palunkukal" | K. J. Yesudas |
| 4. | "Chanchakkam Thenniyum" | K. J. Yesudas |
| 5. | "Chemmana Poomacham" | S. Janaki |

The song Shanthamee Ratriyil was choreographed by Prabhudeva, his Malayalam debut.
