= Jiyo To Aise Jiyo =

- Theatrical poster of the film
- Directed by: Kanak Mishra
- Written by: J K Ahuja
- Produced by: Tarachand Barjatya
- Starring: Arun Govil; Debashree Roy; Jayshree Gadkar; Ram Mohan; Vijay Arora; Neelam Mehra; Ram Sethi; Usman; Goga Kapoor
- Cinematography: K Raman Lal
- Edited by: D S Parmar
- Music by: Raamlaxman
- Distributed by: Rajshri Productions
- Release date: 1981
- Running time: 192 minutes
- Box office: Hit

Jiyo To Aise Jiyo is a 1981 Indian masala movie directed by Kanak Mishra and produced by Tarachand Barjatya. The story and screenplay were written by J K Ahuja. K Raman Lal was the cinematographer of the film. The film narrates a man's struggle who is banished from his house and rides the apex of success in Mumbai. The film stars Arun Govil, Debashree Roy, Jayshree Gadkar, Ram Mohan, Vijay Arora, Neelam Mehra and Ram Sethi. The music was composed by Raamlaxman with lyrics penned by Naqsh Layalpuri and Ravindra Rawal.

The film deals with the theme of struggle of the growing mercantile community in Mumbai. The characters played by Arun Govil and Vijay Arora are depicted as two aspiring business professionals. It was a jubilee hit at box office. The film alludes to the struggle against mobilised usurpers, which was considered to be the reason behind the success of the film. It was the last installment of Barjatya and Govil's collaboration, after which they had a fallout.

== Plot ==
Ramprasad Sharma has two step brothers – Jagdish and Kundan. Kundan is a fine mechanic while Jagdish is well educated. Jagdish and his wife Pinky inform Ramprasad that they want to build a factory in Mumbai. His wife claims that she can easily get a loan of a considerable amount from the bank where her uncle works as a manager but she demands Ramprasad’s house as the mortgage. A naive and kind person, Ramprasad agrees to their proposal but Kundan objects it. Out of agitation Ramprasad banishes him. Kundan arrives Mumbai and starts working as a motor mechanic. Baanke comes to Vidya, Kundan’s love interest and lies to her that he has been there to take her to Kundan in Mumbai. Vidya believes him and leaves with him for Mumbai where she is hosted in a well furnished house. Soon she discovers to her horror that she has been trapped by a gang of ruffians led by Seth Chandan Bal who intend to rape her. She runs away and coincidentally meets Kundan on her way, who saves her from those ruffians. Later, they were married. Pinky insults Ramprasad and Laxmi, his wife, and they leave their house to find resort to somewhere else. They eventually come to Kundan’s house. Kundan is flooded with joy to have met them after a long time. Baanke misguides Pinky and takes her to Seth Chandan Bal’s trap where she gets molested by those ruffians. Fortunately Kundan and Jagdish arrive to save her. The family reunites.

== Cast ==
- Arun Govil as Kundan Sharma, an orphan adopted and brought up by Ramprasad Sharma and his wife Laxmi. He is banished when he opposes Jagdish's motive to mortgage their house and comes to Mumbai where he establishes himself as a successful business professional.
- Debashree Roy as Vidya, wife of Kundan Sharma. A naive village girl who believes Baanke and comes along with him to Mumbai to meet Kundan and falls into the trap of Seth Chandan Bal's gang.
- Jayshree Gadkar as Laxmi, the eldest sister-in-law of Kundan and wife of Ramprasad Sharma. She is tolerant, uncomplaining and very fond of her brothers-in-law.
- Ram Mohan as Ramprasad Sharma, the eldest brother of Kundan.
- Vijay Arora as Jagdish Sharma, an aspiring business professional who is carried away by ambition.
- Neelam Mehra as Pinky, the snobbish, ambitious wife of Jagdish Sharma. She motivates Ramprasad Sharma to mortgage their house and later causes distress to him and his wife Laxmi.
- Ram Sethi as Romeo
- Gopal Sehgal as mental man at car garage
- Sardar Chandan Singh as (Sikh man) car garage owner
- Raj Kumar Kapoor
- Usman as Baanke
- Goga Kapoor as Seth Chandan Bal
- Raj Bharti
- T P Jain

== Crew ==
| Role | Name |
|---|---|
| Story | J K Ahuja |
| Screenplay | J K Ahuja |
| Dialogue | J K Ahuja |
| Cinematography | K Raman Lal |
| Art Direction | H V Maharudra Shetty |
| Editing | D S Parmar |
| Audiography | S W Deshpande |
| Choreography | Saroj Khan; Subal Sarkar |
| Lyrics | Naqsh Layalpuri; Ravindra Rawal |
| Music | Raamlaxman |
| Producer | Tarachand Barjatya |
| Director | Kanak Mishra |

== Soundtrack ==
| Song | Singer |
|---|---|
| Tu Dulhan Hai Deewane Ki | Mahendra Kapoor, Usha Mangeshkar |
| Koyaliya Kali Hai | Bhupinder Singh, Usha Mangeshkar |
| Bambai Ka Raasta | Bhupinder Singh, Jaywant Kulkarni |
| Bagiya Me Khile | Usha Mangeshkar |
| Angan Mein Tulsi | Usha Mangeshkar |
| Damak Damak Dam | Mahendra Kapoor |
