= Sunil Lahri =

Indian actor (born 1961)

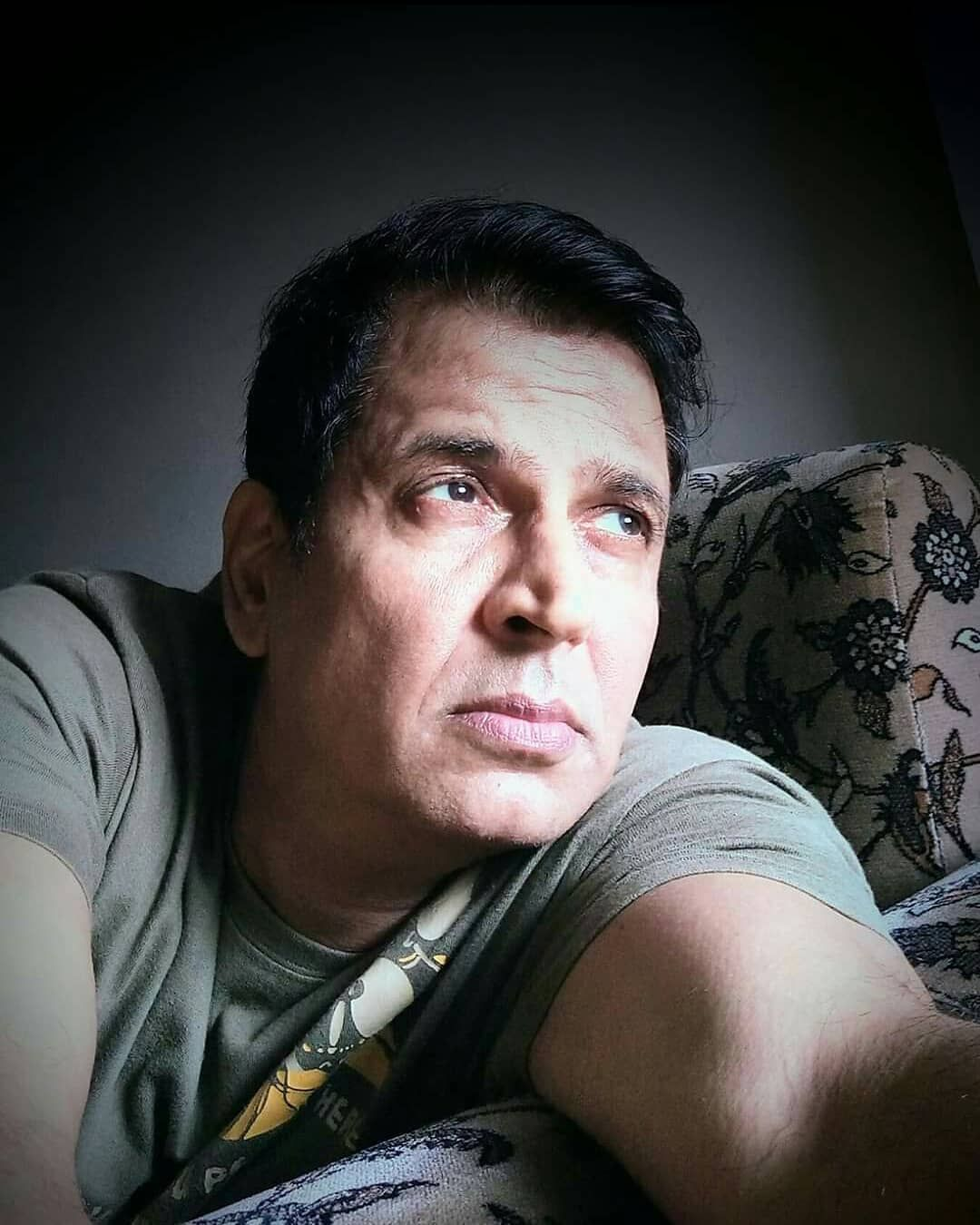
- Born: 9 January 1961 (age 65); Damoh, Madhya Pradesh, India
- Education: Wilson College Mumbai
- Occupation: Actor
- Years active: 1980-1996; 2017-present
- Known for: Lakshman in Ramayan (1987)
- Spouse(s): Radha Sen (divorced) Bharati Pathak
- Children: 1

Sunil Lahri (born 9 January 1961), also called Sunil Lahiri, is an Indian actor, best known for his portrayal of Lakshmana in the television show Ramayan (1987-1988).

== Personal life ==
Lahri was born in Damoh, Madhya Pradesh on 9 January 1961 to Shikar Chandra Lahiri, a professor in a medical college and Tara Lahri. Lahri has two younger brothers. After completing schooling from Bhopal, Lahri moved to Mumbai, where he graduated with a Bachelor of Arts degree from Mumbai's Wilson College.

Lahri married twice. His first wife was Radha Sen, whom he divorced. Later, he married Bharati Pathak. He has a son named Krish.

In 2012, Lahri donated his father's deceased body to the department of forensics of JK Medical college in Bhopal. According to Lahri, his father understood the issues students face in their studies because of absence of accessibility of human anatomy so he wrote in his will that after his passing his body ought to be given to the medical students in order to help them in their studies.

== Career ==
His debut film was The Naxalites (1980), in which he appeared with Smita Patil. He was also part of the 1985 film Phir Aayi Barsaat with Anuradha Patel.

He has done a major role in the 1991 musical Baharon Ke Manzil. He portrayed 2nd Lieutenant Rama Raghoba Rane in 1990 TV series Param Vir Chakra. In 1995, he made an appearance in the film Janam Kundli. He played the role of Ashwani Mehra, Vinod Khanna's son in the film. In 2017, he had also appeared in a Hindi film A Daughter's Tale Pankh.

In 2020, Lahri said during an interview to Dainik Bhaskar that if he gets a chance to play a role in Ramayana again, he will play the role of Ravana.

He was invited for the Ram Mandir consecration ceremony in Ayodhya in January 2024.

== Filmography ==
=== Films ===
- The Naxalites (1980)
- Phir Aayi Barsaat (1985)
- Jazira (1987)
- Baharon Ke Manzil (1991)
- Aaja Meri Jaan (1993)
- Janam Kundli (1995)
- A Daughter's Tale Pankh (2017)

=== Television ===
- Vikram Aur Betaal (1985)
- Ramayan (1987)
- Param Vir Chakra (1988)
- Luv Kush (1988)
- Sapno Ki Duniya (1995-1996)
- The Kapil Sharma Show (2020) - Guest
- Sa Re Ga Ma Pa L'il Champs (2020) - Guest
