= Mulraj Rajda =

Indian writer, actor and director (1931–2012)

- Born: 13 November 1931; Bombay, Bombay Presidency, British India
- Died: 23 September 2012 (aged 80); Mumbai, Maharashtra, India
- Occupations: Actor; Director; Writer
- Years active: 1959–2009
- Known for: Mitti Aur Sona; Aaj Ki Taaza Khabar; Ramayan; Jai Shri Swaminarayan
- Spouse: Indumati Rajda (m. 1956)
- Children: 3 (including Sameer Rajda)
- Relatives: See Rajda family

Mulraj Rajda (13 November 1931 – 23 September 2012) was an Indian writer, actor and director who predominantly worked in Hindi and Gujarati films, television shows and theatre. He is regarded as one of the finest artist in the Gujarati cinema. He has appeared in over 50 films, television serials in Gujarati cinema and in Hindi Cinema as an actor, writer, and director, in a career that has spanned over five decades.

After directing many Gujarati theatre plays and television serials, he directed a Gujarati film in (1979) Koinu Mindhal Koina Hathe which was quite successful. The film featured Vikram Gokhale and Rajni Bala.

He is known for writing Aaj Ki Taaza Khabar (1973), Mitti Aur Sona (1989), Jai Shakumbhari Maa (2000), Jai Shri Swaminarayan (2002). The first one helped him to earn him a nomination in Best Story in the prestigious Filmfare Awards in 1974.

Apart from writing and directing, he was quite active as an actor in films, theatre and television serials some of his works are Jesal Toral (1971), Nagin Aur Suhagin (1979), Aman Laxmi (1980), Ramayan (1987), Mahabharat (1989), Vishwamitra (1989), Dil Hi Toh Hai (1992), Byomkesh Bakshi (1993), Krantiveer (1994), Lahoo Ke Do Rang (1997), Mrityudaata (1997), Boond (2001) and Rit Rivaj (2009).

== Early life ==
Mulraj was born on 13 November 1931 in a Gujarati family living in Kalbadevi, Mumbai. After the graduation, Mulraj started working in the Cable Corporation of India and Dena Bank for 2 years.

He started his career in the entertainment field in 1959 when he wrote and acted in a Gujarati play.

== Personal life ==
Mulraj Rajda married actress Indumati on 2 March 1956 and the couple are blessed with 3 children. Indumati has acted in many JD Majethia shows like Khichdi (2002 TV series) (2002), Instant Khichdi (2004) and in Sarabhai VS Sarabhai (2004). She also starred in Indra Kumar directed Mann (film) (1999). This is the one and only Hindi film she has been part of, though she has a huge body of work in Gujarati films. One of their children is also an actor named Sameer Rajda who has worked with his father in Vikram Aur Betaal, Ramayan, Mahabharat etc.

== Career ==
=== Start in Gujarati industry ===
Mulraj Rajda spent much of his career working in Gujarati cinema and Theater. After being active in Gujarati theatre for more than 15 years, he joined Gujarati film industry as a writer and actor. Over the years he has continued to write, act and direct Gujarati TV shows, plays and films. Some of his Gujarati TV serials are – Naari Tu Na Haari, Chal Mhare Sathe, O Zindagi, Surajmukhi, etc.

=== Acting in television serials ===
He is most well known for portraying Janak in Ramanand Sagar's television series Ramayan. Before this, he played various roles in Sagar's other works, including Vikram aur Betaal. He also has portrayed Vashishtha in the television series Vishwamitra. He is the father of fellow actor and Ramayan co-star Sameer Rajda. He also played the role of Kailash Chandra in the episode Bhoot for Byomkesh Bakshi (TV series), broadcast iy Doordarshan in 1993. He also acted as King Shantanu's royal guru as well as a gandharva mukhiya in B.R. Chopra's Mahabharat.

=== Writer in Hindi industry ===
He wrote the story of Aaj Ki Taaza Khabar in 1973 for which he was nominated in the prestigious Filmfare Awards in the category of Best Story Writing in 1974. Then in 1989, Pheka Pheki a Marathi Language film was made which was the remake of Aaj Ki Taaza Khabar (1973). Then again in 2008, Rohit Shetty made Golmaal Returns which was the remake of Pheka Pheki (1989).

He wrote the screenplay of Mitti Aur Sona in (1989) with Debu Sen, directed by Shiv Kumar starring Chunky Pandey, Neelam Kothari, Sonam (actress), Aruna Irani, Gulshan Grover and Vinod Mehra.

=== Directing films and television serials ===
Before entering into directing films and television shows, he has directed many plays in Gujarati theatre. Mulraj first directed Koinu Mindhal Koina Hathe (1979) a Gujarati film starring Vikram Gokhale, Rajni Bala, Arvind Rathod and Snehlata, produced by Sunil Bohra. In 2002, he wrote and directed the TV series Jai Shri Swaminarayan (2002) produced by Devang Patel.

== Partial filmography ==
=== Films ===
Year	Film	Language
1971	Jesal Toral	Gujarati
1972	Narad Leela	Hindi
1979	Nagin Aur Suhagin	Hindi
1980	Aman Laxmi	Hindi
1980	Bhathiji Maharaj	Gujarati
1984	Prem Pagna	Hindi
1984	Bahu Ho Toh Aisi	Hindi
1991	Pratigyabadh	Hindi
1992	Dil Hi To Hai (1992 film)	Hindi
1994	Krantiveer	Hindi
1994	Karan (1994 film)	Hindi
1995	Shradha Ne Sathaware	Gujarati
1996	Yash	Hindi
1997	Jai Mahalaxmi Maa	Hindi
1997	Lahoo Ke Do Rang	Hindi
1997	Mrityudaata	Hindi
1997	Sanam (1997 film)	Hindi
2001	Boond	

=== As writer ===
Year	Film	Notes
1973	Aaj Ki Taaza Khabar	Story
1989	Mitti Aur Sona	Screenplay along with Debu Sen
1989	Pheka Pheki	Original Story
2000	Jai Shakumbhari Maa	Devotional Movie
2002	Jai Shri Swaminarayan	Television Serial
2008	Golmaal Returns	Original Story
2009	Rit Rivaj	Dialogues

=== As director ===
Year	Film	Notes
1979	Koinu Mindhal Koina Hathe	Gujarati Language Film
2002	Jai Shri Swaminarayan	

=== Television ===
Year	Serial	Role	Channel
1985	Vikram Aur Betaal		DD National
1985	Rajni		
1986	Dada Dadi Ki Kahaniyan		
1987	Ramayan	Janak	DD National
1988-1989	Mahabharat	King Shantanu's Royal Guru / Gandharva Mukhiya	DD National
1989	Vishwamitra	Vashishtha	DD National
1993	Byomkesh Bakshi (Episode 8: Bhoot)	Kailash Chandra	DD National
1993	Kanoon (Episode: Bekasoor)	Girdharilal Khanna	DD Metro
1995	Swabhimaan		DD National
1997	Alif Laila	Hakim Douban	DD National
2003	Vishnu Puran		Zee TV
2009	Rit Rivaj		

== Nominations ==
Year	Award Show	Award	Show	Result
1974	Filmfare Awards	Best Story	Aaj Ki Taaza Khabar	Nominated

== Death ==
Mulraj Rajda died due to age related complications on 23 September 2012 at the age of 80 in Mumbai, Maharashtra. From 2009, Rajda was on a break and preferred to stay home with his family in his last years. In his last years, he was writing for a few films.

== See also ==
- Gujarati film directors
