= List of Vetala Tales =

Vetala Tales is a popular collection of short stories from India of unknown age and antiquity, but predating the 11th century CE. It exists in four main Sanskrit recensions (revisions). In addition, there also exists many modern translations into Indian and other vernaculars.

The collection consists of a series of unrelated tales, all told within the context of a frame story similar to Scheherazade's in Arabian nights. The exact content of the frame stories varies between versions, but always involves the core element of King Vikramaditya carrying a dead body to a yogi or holy man in a cemetery. The body is subsequently possessed by a Vetala (a predatory undead spirit in Hindu mythology), who tells Vikramaditya the tales contained in the narrative to pass the time, and then subsequently aids him in thwarting the yogi's nefarious scheme in the conclusion of the story. Unlike the Panchatantra, whose recensions and translations sometimes vary greatly (see List of Panchatantra Stories for a tabulated comparison), the overall content and structure of the Vetala Tales has remained relatively stable (though exhibiting many minor differences).

== Versions compared ==
For additional bibliographic information, see Vetala Panchavimshati.

- Ks = Kshemendra: Brhatkathamanjari (c. 1037) — Sanskrit verse version of the "Northwestern" Brihatkatha; includes the Vetala Tales.
- So = Somadeva: Kathasaritsagara (c. 1070) — Sanskrit verse version of the "Northwestern" Brihatkatha; includes the Vetala Tales in Book 12.
- Ry = Arthur W. Ryder: Twenty-two Goblins (1917) — English translation of most of Somadeva's Vetala Tales text.
- vB = J. A. B. van Buitenen: "The King and the Corpse" in Tales of Ancient India (1959) — English translation of about half of Somadeva's Vetala Tales text.
- Ja = Jambhaladatta: Vetālapañcavinśati (11th- to 14th-century) — Sanskrit recension. (* indicates stories Emeneau considers to have been in Jambhaladatta's original text, but do not appear in the Bengali recension, which defines his edition.)
- Ne = Newari version — Nepali version apparently based on Jambhaladatta, noted by Emeneau.
- Si = Sivadasa: Vetālapañcavinśatika (11th- to 14th-century) — The Sanskrit recension that most modern translations ultimately derive from.
- La = Lallu Lal: Buetal Pucheesee (1805) — Translation into Literary Hindi, deriving ultimately from Sivadasa. Frequently edited, reprinted, and translated (often as Baital Pachisi).
- Ta = Tamil version — Noted by Penzer, but without specifying its derivation. Probably the Tamil Perunkathai, derivant of Brihatkatha or Kathasaritsagara
- Bu = Sir Richard Francis Burton: Vikram and the Vampire (1870) — A loose retelling, based on the Hindi. Here, decimals indicate elements of multiple source stories combined within one Burtonian story.

== Tales ==
The table below compares the content and order of tales in these versions. The frame story is never numbered, but sometimes the conclusion of the frame story is numbered, sometimes not; where it is not it is indicated with a decimal (e.g. "25.2") in the table.

Tale	Ks	So	Ry	vB	Ja	Ne	Si	La	Ta	Bu
How the prince obtained a wife	1	1	1		1	1	1	1	1	1
Three young brahmans	2	2	2	1	2	2	2	2	2	6.2
King and two wise birds	3	3	3		3	3	3	4	6	2
Adventures of Viravara	4	4	4		4	4	4	3	7	3
Somaprabha and three suitors	6	5	5		6	6	5	5	4	6.1
Lady and the changed heads	7	6	6	2	8	7	6	6	5	9
King's dependent and the nereid	8	7	7		7	8	8	8	8	
Three fastidious men	5	8	8	3	5	5	23	23	3	
Anangarati and four suitors	9	9	9		9	9	7	7		4.1
(Tamil story 9)									9	
Madanasena's rash promise	10	10			10	10	9	9	10	4.2
Three very sensitive wives	11	11	10	4	11	11	10	10	11	10
King Yasahketu and his wife	12	12	11		*		11	11	12	
Harisvamin and his bad luck	13	13	12		12	12	12	12	16	
Merchant's daughter and thief	14	14	13		*	23	13	13	17	5
Magic pill	15	15	14	5	13	13	14	14	18	8
Sacrifice of Jimutavahana	16	16	15		24	24	15	15	19	
Beautiful Unmadini	17	17	16	6	14	14	16	16	20	
Brahman's son and magic power	18	18	17		15	15	17	17	13	
The thief's son	19	19		7	16	16	18	18		
Brahman boy's sacrifice	20	20	18	8	17	17	19	19	21	
Anangamanjari and Kamalakara	21	21	19		18	18	20	20	14	
Four brothers and the lion	22	22	20	9	19	19	21	21	15	7
Hermit who wept and danced	23	23	21	10	20	20	22	22	22	
How four merchant princes fared with the courtesan					21	21				
How Muladeva obtained a bride for Sasideva					22	22				
The ogre who ravaged King Arimaulimani's kingdom					23					
(Tamil story 23)									23	
Hermit who wept and danced (repeated)								24		
Father and son marry mother and daughter	24	24	22.1	11.1	25.1	25.1	24	25.1	24.1	11
Conclusion	25	25	22.2	11.2	25.2	25.2	25	25.2	24.2	12

== Frame story ==
The elements of the frame story vary significantly between versions, and the logical or narrative connections between them are not always made clear.

=== Sanskrit and Hindi frames ===
Transfers of throne and fruit

King Gandharvasena (father of Vikramaditya) dies. His 1st son, Shank, succeeds, but is killed by the 2nd son, Vikramaditya, who succeeds to the throne. However, Vikramaditya goes abroad, consigning the throne to the 3rd son, Bharthari. Then follows the episode of the Fruit of Immortality: the fruit gets passed around, its trail revealing conflicting loyalties; because of this, Bharthari becomes despondent and vacates the throne. Indra sends a demon to guard the city, but Vikramaditya returns to regain the throne and subdues the demon. The demon narrates the story of "Three sons" (below) to Vikramaditya.

This narrative does not occur in any of the Sanskrit recensions. It begins Lāl's Hindi translation, and has a close analogue in the Thirty-Two Tales of the Throne of Vikramaditya (Simhāsana Dvātriṃśikā). Burton includes it in his introduction.

Three sons

A) A king comes across an ascetic absorbed in supernatural meditation. Out of pique the king decides to disturb the ascetic, and sends a harlot to seduce him. She succeeds and eventually brings the ascetic and his son to the city, at which point the ascetic realizes he has been tricked out of his merit. In anger he kills his child.

B) This leads (it is not explained how) to the birth of 3 children in the same city at the same time with linked destinies: the sons of a king, a potter, and an oil merchant. The potter's son kills the oil merchant's son.

This narrative occurs in Sivadasa and Lāl. Only in Lāl is it made clear that the king's son is Vikramaditya, the potter's son is the yogi (of the subsequent section), and the oil merchant's son is the body inhabited by the Vetala. In his conclusion, Jambhaladatta has the Vetala narrate his own previous history which is somewhat related to part B, but with a very different overall story. Burton has Indra's giant tell part B, then part A which occurs subsequently (the ascetic here being the yogi himself).

Yogi and Vetala

Every day, a yogi (Kṣāntiśīla in many versions) brings a fruit to Vikramaditya which he passes off to an attendant or minister. One day the fruit is accidentally broken open in the king's presence, revealing a priceless jewel. Investigation reveals that all the fruits likewise contained jewels. Vikramaditya questions the yogi who states that he intends to perform rites in a cremation-ground and asks the king to join him on a certain night. Vikramaditya agrees. When he does so, the yogi asks him to bring him a certain dead body hanging from a tree in another nearby cremation-ground. The body turns out to be inhabited by a vetala, who decides to pass the time on the way back to the yogi by telling tales.

This narrative occurs in all 4 Sanskrit recensions, as well as most other versions.

Conclusion

After the Vetala is done telling his tales, he helps Vikramaditya by predicting the yogi's treachery, and explaining a ruse by which he can avoid it. Vikramaditya finally succeeds in bringing the body to the yogi, and just before the end of the rite, tricks and kills the yogi. Vikramaditya then generally receives great power and specific boons (including that this very story achieve great renown).

This narrative occurs in all 4 Sanskrit recensions, as well as most other versions. The power and boons are attributed to different sources in different versions, e.g. a result of the rite itself (Sivadasa), gandharvas (Sivadasa), Indra (Lāl), Shiva (Somadeva), a goddess (Jambhaladatta).

An abbreviated version of "Yogi and Vetala" and the Conclusion is given as the 31st of the Thirty-Two Tales of the Throne of Vikramaditya (Simhāsana Dvātriṃśikā).

=== Other frames ===
The beginning of the Tamil version mirrors the frame story of the Katha-sarit-sagara, in that the Vetala is actually a Brahmin, cursed for repeating Shiva's tale — the Vetala Tales in fact — which the Vetala must now repeat until someone (Vikrama) can solve their riddles.

The compilation, also known as Tales of the Bewitched Corpse, migrated northwards to Tibet (where it appears as Ro-sgrung) and later to Mongolia (where it is known as Siditü kegür, and in Oirat as Siddhi kǖr). In both the Tibetan and Mongolian versions not only the frame story, but also the component tales, are quite different.
