= Simhasanam =

Simhasanam may refer to:

- Simhasana, kneeling posture in hatha yoga
- Singhasan, a 1986 Indian Hindi-language film
- Simhasanam (1986 film), an Indian Telugu-language epic historical film
- Simhasanam (2012 film), an Indian Malayalam-language action film
- Sinhasan Singh, Indian politician

== See also ==
- Singhasan Battisi, a collection of Indian folklore
  - Sinhasan Battisi (TV series), its 2014 television adaptation
