= Vikramaditya =

Legendary emperor of Ujjain, India

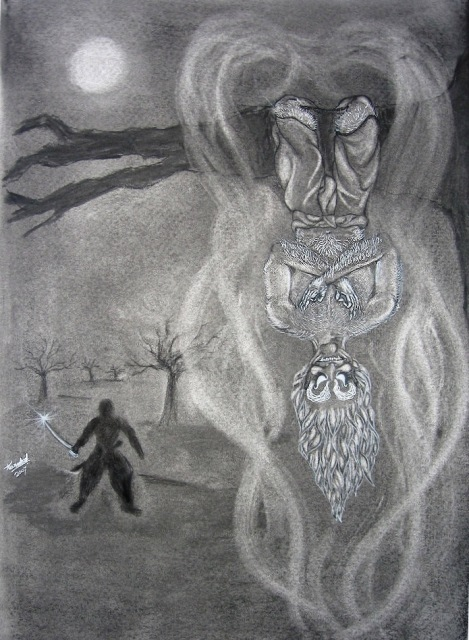
Contemporary artist's impression of a vetala hanging from a tree, with Vikramaditya in the background

Vikramaditya (IAST: Vikramāditya) was a mythical king as mentioned in ancient Indian literature, featuring in traditional stories including those in Vetala Panchavimshati and Singhasan Battisi. Many describe him as ruler with his capital at Ujjain (Pataliputra or Pratishthana in a few stories). "Vikramaditya" was also a common title adopted by several monarchs in ancient and medieval India, and the Vikramaditya legends may be embellished accounts of different kings (particularly Chandragupta II). According to popular tradition, Vikramaditya began the Vikram Samvat era in 57 BCE after defeating the Shakas, and those who believe that he is based on a historical figure place him around the first century BCE. However, this era is identified as "Vikrama Samvat" after the ninth century CE.

== Names and etymology ==
Vikramaditya means "the sun of valour" (vikrama means "valour" and aditya means "sun"). He is also known as Vikrama, Bikramjit and Vikramarka (arka also means "sun"). Some legends describe him as a liberator of India from mlechchha invaders; the invaders are identified as Shakas in most, and the king is known by the epithet Shakari (IAST: Śakāri; "enemy of the Shakas").

== Early legends ==
Although Vikramaditya is mentioned in a few works dated to before the Gupta period (240–550 CE), portions (including Vikramaditya) may be later Gupta-era interpolations. The earliest work to mention Vikramaditya was probably Brihatkatha, an Indian epic written between the first century BCE and the third century CE in the unattested Paisaci language. Its existence (and its mention of Vikramaditya) is confirmed only by adaptations in surviving works dating to the sixth century and later and testimonials by contemporary poets. Since there is no surviving copy of Brihatkatha, it is unknown if it contained the Vikramaditya legends; its post-Gupta adaptations, such as the Katha-Sarit-Sagara, may contain interpolations.

Gaha Sattasai (or Gatha-Saptasati), a collection of poems attributed to the Satavahana king Hāla (r. 20 – 24 CE), mentions a king named Vikramaditya who gave away his wealth out of charity. However, many stanzas in this work are not common to its revisions and are apparent Gupta-period expansions. The verse about Vikramaditya is similar to a phrase—Anekago-shatasahasra-hiranya-kotipradasya—found in Gupta inscriptions about Samudragupta and Chandragupta II (for example, the Pune and Riddhapur copper-plate inscriptions of Chandragupta's daughter, Prabhavatigupta); this phrase may have been a later, Gupta-era insertion in the work attributed to Hāla.

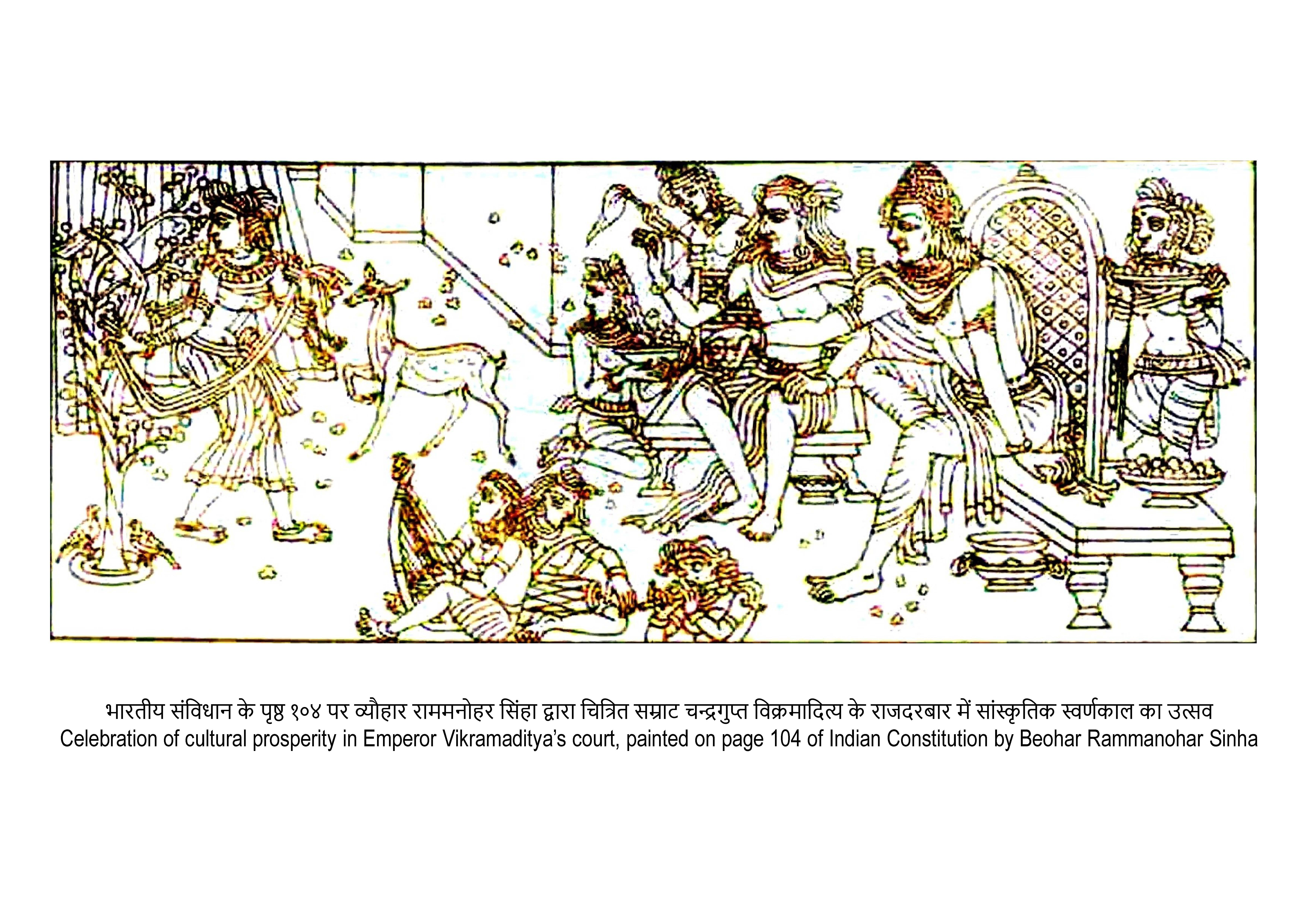
Depiction of Vikramaditya in his royal court in the calligraphic Constitution of India, illustration by Beohar Rammanohar Sinha

The earliest uncontested mentions of Vikramaditya appear in sixth-century works: the biography of Vasubandhu by Paramartha (499–569) and Vasavadatta by Subandhu. Paramaratha quotes a legend that mentions Ayodhya ("A-yu-ja") as the capital of King Vikramaditya ("Pi-ka-la-ma-a-chi-ta"). According to this legend, the king gave 300,000 gold coins to the Samkhya scholar Vindhyavasa for defeating Vasubandhu's Buddhist teacher (Buddhamitra) in a philosophical debate. Vasubandhu then wrote Paramartha Saptati, illustrating deficiencies in Samkhya philosophy. Vikramaditya, pleased with Vasubandhu's arguments, gave him 300,000 gold coins as well. Vasubandhu later taught Buddhism to Prince Baladitya and converted the queen to Buddhism after the king's death. According to Subandhu, Vikramaditya was a glorious memory of his time.

In his Si-yu-ki, Xuanzang (c. 602 – c. 664) identifies Vikramaditya as the king of Shravasti. According to his account, the king (despite his treasurer's objections) ordered that 500,000 gold coins be distributed to the poor and gave a man 100,000 gold coins to put him back on track during a wild boar hunt. Around the same time, a Buddhist monk named Manoratha paid a barber 100,000 gold coins for shaving his head. Vikramaditya, who prided himself on his generosity, was embarrassed and arranged a debate between Manoratha and 100 non-Buddhist scholars. After Manoratha defeated 99 of the scholars, the king and other non-Buddhists shouted him down and humiliated him at the beginning of the last debate. Before his death, Manoratha wrote to his disciple Vasubandhu about the futility of debating biased, ignorant people. Shortly after Vikramaditya's death, Vasubandhu asked his successor, Baladitya, to organise another debate to avenge his mentor's humiliation. In this debate, Vasubandhu defeated 100 non-Buddhist scholars.

== 10th–12th-century legends ==
=== Brihatkatha adaptations ===
Kshemendra's Brihatkathamanjari and Somadeva's 11th-century Kathasaritsagara, both adaptations of Brihatkatha, contain a number of legends about Vikramaditya. Each legend has several fantasy stories within a story, illustrating his power.

The first legend mentions Vikramaditya's rivalry with the king of Pratishthana. In this version, that king is named Narasimha (not Shalivahana) and Vikramaditya's capital is Pataliputra (not Ujjain). According to the legend, Vikramaditya was an adversary of Narasimha who invaded Dakshinapatha and besieged Pratishthana; he was defeated and forced to retreat. He then entered Pratishthana in disguise and won over a courtesan. Vikramaditya was her lover for some time before secretly returning to Pataliputra. Before his return, he left five golden statues which he had received from Kubera at the courtesan's house. If a limb of one of these miraculous statues was broken off and gifted to someone, the golden limb would grow back. Mourning the loss of her lover, the courtesan turned to charity; known for her gifts of gold, she soon surpassed Narasimha in fame. Vikramaditya later returned to the courtesan's house, where Narasimha met and befriended him. Vikramaditya married the courtesan and brought her to Pataliputra.

Book 12 (Shashankavati) contains the vetala panchavimshati legends, popularly known as the Vetala Panchavimshati. It is a collection of 25 stories in which the king tries to capture and hold a vetala who tells a puzzling tale which ends with a question. In addition to Kathasaritsagara, the collection appears in three other Sanskrit recensions, a number of Indian vernacular versions and several English translations from Sanskrit and Hindi; it is the most popular of the Vikramaditya legends. There are minor variations among the recensions; see List of Vetala Tales. In Kshemendra, Somadeva and Śivadāsa's recensions, the king is named Trivikramasena; in Kathasaritsagara, his capital is located at Pratishthana. At the end of the story, the reader learns that he was formerly Vikramaditya. Later texts, such as the Sanskrit Vetala-Vikramaditya-Katha and the modern vernacular versions, identify the king as Vikramaditya of Ujjain.

Book 18 (Vishamashila) contains another legend told by Naravahanadatta to an assembly of hermits in the ashram of a sage, Kashyapa. According to the legend, Indra and other devas told Shiva that the slain asuras were reborn as mlechchhas. Shiva then ordered his attendant, Malyavat, to be born in Ujjain as the prince of the Avanti kingdom and kill the mlechchhas. The deity appeared to the Avanti king Mahendraditya in a dream, telling him that a son would be born to his queen Saumyadarshana. He asked the king to name the child Vikramaditya, and told him that the prince would be known as "Vishamashila" because of his hostility to enemies. Malyavat was born as Vikramaditya; when the prince grew up, Mahendraditya retired to Varanasi. Vikramaditya began a campaign to conquer a number of kingdoms and subdued vetalas, rakshasas and other demons. His general, Vikramashakti, conquered the Dakshinapatha in the south; Madhyadesa in the central region; Surashtra in the west, and the country east of the Ganges; Vikramashakti also made the northern kingdom of Kashmira a tributary state of Vikramaditya. Virasena, the king of Sinhala, gave his daughter Madanalekha to Vikramaditya in marriage. The emperor also married three other women (Gunavati, Chandravati and Madanasundari) and Kalingasena, the princess of Kalinga.

The Brihatkathamanjari contains similar legends, with some variations; Vikramaditya's general Vikramashakti defeated a number of mlechchhas, including Kambojas, Yavanas, Hunas, Barbaras, Tusharas and Persians. In Brihatkathamanjari and Kathasaritsagara, Malyavat is later born as Gunadhya (the author of Brihatkatha, on which these books are based).

=== Rajatarangini ===
Kalhana's 12th-century Rajatarangini mentions that Harsha Vikramaditya of Ujjayini defeated the Shakas. According to the chronicle Vikramaditya appointed his friend, the poet Matrigupta, ruler of Kashmir. After Vikramaditya's death, Matrigupta abdicated the throne in favour of Pravarasena. According to D. C. Sircar, Kalhana confused the legendary Vikramaditya with the Vardhana Emperor Harshavardhana (c. 606 – c. 47 CE); Madhusudana's 17th-century Bhavabodhini similarly confuses the two kings, and mentions that Harsha, the author of Ratnavali, had his capital at Ujjain.

=== Other legends ===
According to Ananta's 12th-century heroic poem, Vira-Charitra (or Viracharita), Shalivahana (or Satavahana) defeated and killed Vikramaditya and ruled from Pratishthana. Shalivahana's associate, Shudraka, later allied with Vikramaditya's successors and defeated Shalivahana's descendants. This legend contains a number of mythological stories.

Śivadāsa's 12th– to 14th-century Śālivāhana Kātha (or Shalivahana-Charitra) similarly describes the rivalry between Vikramaditya and Shalivahana. Ānanda's Mādhavānala Kāmakandalā Kathā is a story of separated lovers who are reunited by Vikramaditya. Vikramodaya is a series of verse tales in which the emperor appears as a wise parrot; a similar series is found in the Jain text, Pārśvanāthacaritra. The 15th-century—or later—Pañcadaṇḍachattra Prabandha (The Story of Umbrellas With Five Sticks) contains "stories of magic and witchcraft, full of wonderful adventures, in which Vikramāditya plays the rôle of a powerful magician". Ganapati's 16th-century Gujarati work, Madhavanala-Kamakandala-Katha, also contains Vikramaditya stories.

== Paramara legends ==
The Paramara kings, who ruled Malwa (including Ujjain) from the ninth to the fourteenth century, associated themselves with Vikramaditya and other legendary kings to justify their imperial claims.

=== Simhasana Dvatrimsika ===
Simhasana Dvatrimsika (popularly known as Singhasan Battisi) contains 32 folktales about Vikramaditya. In this collection of frame stories, the Paramara king Bhoja discovers the ancient throne of Vikramaditya after several centuries. The throne has 32 statues, who are actually apsaras (a type of female spirit of the clouds and waters in Hinduism and Buddhist culture) who were turned into stone by a curse. When Bhoja tries to ascend the throne, one apsara comes to life and tells him to ascend the throne only if he is as magnanimous as Vikramaditya (as revealed by her tale). This leads to 32 attempts by Bhoja to ascend the throne, with 32 tales of Vikramaditya's virtue; after each, Bhoja acknowledges his inferiority. Pleased with his humility, the statues finally let him ascend the throne.

The author and date of the original work are unknown. Since the story mentions Bhoja (who died in 1055), it must have been composed after the 11th century. Five primary recensions of the Sanskrit version, Simhasana-dvatrimsika, are dated to the 13th and 14th centuries. According to Sujan Rai's 1695 Khulasat-ut-Tawarikh, its author was Bhoja's wazir (prime minister) Pandit Braj.

Vetala Panchavimshati and Simhasana Dvatrimsika are structurally opposite. In the Vetala tales, Vikramaditya is the central character of the frame story but is unconnected with the individual tales except for hearing them from the vetala. Although the frame story of the Throne Tales is set long after Vikramaditya's death, those tales describe his life and deeds.

=== Bhavishya Purana ===
Paramara-era legends associate the Paramara rulers with legendary kings, in order to enhance the Paramara imperial claims. The Bhavishya Purana, an ancient Hindu text which has been edited till as late as 19th century, connects Vikramaditya to the Paramaras. According to the text (3.1.6.45-7.4), the first Paramara king was Pramara (born from a fire pit at Mount Abu, thus an Agnivansha). Vikramaditya, Shalivahana and Bhoja are described as Pramara's descendants and members of the Paramara dynasty.

According to the Bhavishya Purana, when the world was degraded by non-Vedic faiths, Shiva sent Vikramaditya to earth and established a throne decorated with 32 designs for him (a reference to Simhasana Dvatrimsika). Shiva's wife, Parvati, created a vetala to protect Vikramaditya and instruct him with riddles (a reference to Vetala Panchavimshati legends). After hearing the vetala's stories, Vikramaditya performed an ashvamedha (horse sacrifice). The wandering of the sacrificial horse defined the boundary of Vikramaditya's empire: the Indus River in the west, Badaristhana (Badrinath) in the north, Kapila in the east and Setubandha (Rameswaram) in the south. The emperor united the four Agnivanshi clans by marrying princesses from the three non-Paramara clans: Vira from the Chauhan clan, Nija from the Chalukya clan, and Bhogavati from the Parihara clan. All the gods except Chandra celebrated his success (a reference to the Chandravanshis, rivals of Suryavanshi clans such as the Paramaras).

There were 18 kingdoms in Vikramaditya's empire of Bharatavarsha (India). After a flawless reign, he ascended to heaven. At the beginning of the Kali Yuga, Vikramaditya came from Kailasa and convened an assembly of sages from the Naimisha Forest. Gorakhnath, Bhartrhari, Lomaharsana, Saunaka and other sages recited the Puranas and the Upapuranas. A hundred years after Vikramaditya's death, the Shakas invaded India again. Shalivahana, Vikramaditya's grandson, subjugated them and other invaders. Five hundred years after Shalivahana's death, Bhoja defeated later invaders.

== Jain legends ==
Several works by Jain authors contain legends about Vikramaditya, including:

- Prabhachandra's Prabhavaka Charita (1127 CE)
- Somaprabha's Kumara-Pala-Pratibodha (1184)
- Kalakacharya-Katha (before 1279)
- Merutunga's Prabandha-Chintamani (1304)
- Jinaprabhasuri's Vividha-Tirtha-Kalpa (1315)
- Rajashekhara's Prabandha-Kosha (1348)
- Devamurti's Vikrama-Charitra (1418)
- Ramachandrasuri's Pancha-Danda-Chhattra-Prabandha (1433)
- Subhashila's Vikrama-Charitra (1442)
- Pattavalis (lists of head monks)

Few references to Vikramaditya exist in Jain literature before the mid-12th century, although Ujjain appears frequently. After the Jain king Kumarapala (r. 1143–1172), Jain writers started to compare Kumarapala to Vikramaditya. By the end of the 13th century, legends featuring Vikramaditya as a Jain emperor began surfacing. A major theme in Jain tradition is that the Śvetāmbara Jain acharya Siddhasena Divakara converted Vikramaditya to Jainism. He is said to have told Vikramaditya that 1,199 years after him, there would be another great king like him (Kumarapala).

Jain tradition originally had four Simhasana-related stories and four vetala-related puzzle stories. Later Jain authors adopted the 32 Simhasana Dvatrimsika and 25 Vetala Panchavimshati stories.

The Jain author Hemachandra names Vikramaditya as one of four learned kings; the other three are Shalivahana, Bhoja and Munja. Merutunga's Vicarasreni places his victory at Ujjain in 57 BCE, and hints that his four successors ruled from 3 to 78 CE.

=== Shalivahana-Vikramaditya rivalry ===
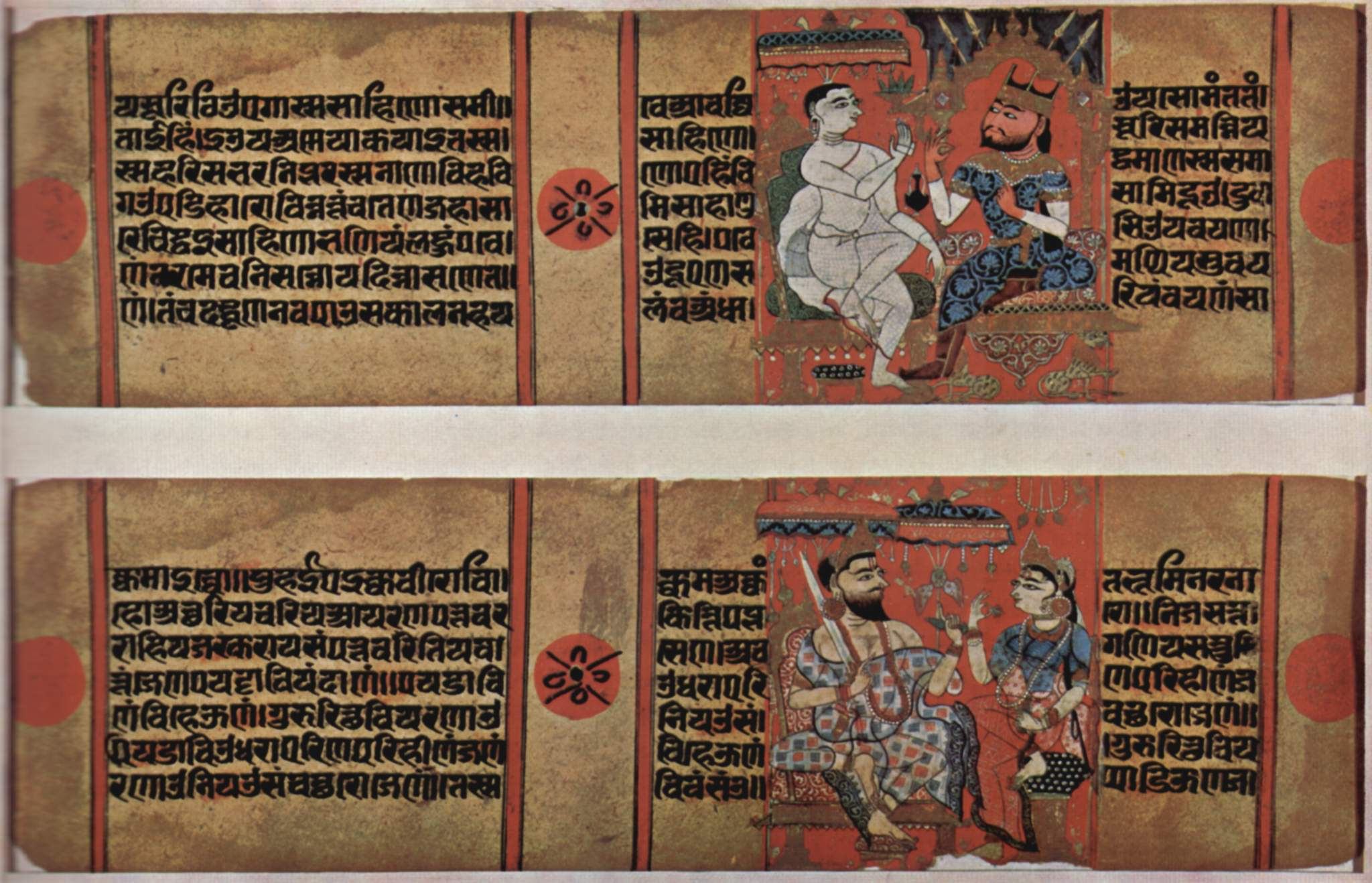
Kalpasutra and Kalakacharya Katha manuscript

Many legends, particularly Jain legends, associate Vikramaditya with Shalivahana of Pratishthana (another legendary king). In some he is defeated by Shalivahana, who begins the Shalivahana era; in others, he is an ancestor of Shalivahana. A few legends call the king of Pratishthana "Vikramaditya". Political rivalry between the kings is sometimes extended to language, with Vikramaditya supporting Sanskrit and Shalivahana supporting Prakrit.

In the Kalakacharya-Kathanaka, Vikramaditya's father Gardabhilla abducted the sister of Kalaka (a Śvetāmbara Jain acharya). At Kalaka's insistence, the Shakas invaded Ujjain and made Gardabhilla their prisoner. Vikramaditya later arrived from Pratishthana, defeated the Shakas, and began the Vikrama Samvat era to commemorate his victory. According to Alain Daniélou, the Vikramaditya in this legend refers to a Satavahana king.

Other Jain texts contain variations of a legend about Vikramaditya's defeat at the hands of the king of Pratishthana, known as Satavahana or Shalivahana. This theme is found in Jina-Prabhasuri's Kalpa-Pradipa, Rajashekhara's Prabandha-Kosha and Salivahana-Charitra, a Marathi work. According to the legend, Satavahana was the child of the Nāga (serpent) chief Shesha and a Brahmin widow who lived in the home of a potter. His name, Satavahana, was derived from satani (give) and vahana (a means of transport) because he sculpted elephants, horses and other means of transport with clay and gave them to other children. Vikramaditya perceived omens that his killer had been born. He sent his vetala to find the child; the vetala traced Satavahana in Pratishthana, and Vikramaditya led an army there. With Nāga magic, Satavahana converted his clay figures of horses, elephants and soldiers into a real army. He defeated Vikramaditya (who fled to Ujjain), began his own era, and became a Jain. There are several variations of this legend: Vikramaditya is killed by Satavahana's arrow in battle; he marries Satavahana's daughter and they have a son (known as Vikramasena or Vikrama-charitra), or Satavahana is the son of Manorama, wife of a bodyguard of the king of Pratishthana.

== Tamil legends ==
In a medieval Tamil legend Vikramaditya has 32 marks on his body, a characteristic of universal emperors. A Brahmin in need of Alchemic quicksilver tells him that it can be obtained if the emperor offers his head to the goddess Kamakshi of Kanchipuram. Although Vikramaditya agrees to sacrifice himself, the goddess fulfills his wish without the sacrifice.

In another Tamil legend, Vikramaditya offers to perform a variant of the navakhandam rite (cutting the body in nine places) to please the gods. He offers to cut his body in eight places (for the eight Bhairavas), and offers his head to the goddess. In return, he convinces the goddess to end human sacrifice.

Chola Purva Patayam (Ancient Chola Record), a Tamil manuscript of uncertain date, contains a legend about the divine origin of the three Tamil dynasties. In this legend, Shalivahana (also known as Bhoja) is a shramana king. He defeats Vikramaditya, and begins persecuting worshipers of Shiva and Vishnu. Shiva then creates the three Tamil kings to defeat him: Vira Cholan, Ula Cheran, and Vajranga Pandiyan. The kings have a number of adventures, including finding treasures and inscriptions of Hindu kings from the age of Shantanu to Vikramaditya. They ultimately defeat Shalivahana in the year 1443 (of an uncertain calendar era, possibly from the beginning of Kali Yuga).

== Ayodhya legend ==
According to a legend in Ayodhya, the city was re-discovered by Vikramaditya after it was lost for centuries. Vikramaditya began searching for Ayodhya and met Prayaga, the king of tirthas. Guided by Prayaga, Vikramaditya marked the place but then forgot where it was. A yogi told him that he should free a cow and calf; Ayodhya would be where milk began to flow from the cow's udder. Following this advice, Vikramaditya found the site of ancient Ayodhya.

According to Hans T. Bakker, present-day Ayodhya was originally the Saketa, mentioned in Buddhist sources. The Gupta emperor Skandagupta, who compared himself to Rama and was also known as Vikramaditya, moved his capital to Saketa and renamed it Ayodhya after the legendary city in the Ramayana. The Vikramaditya mentioned in Paramartha's fourth–fifth century CE biography of Vasubandhu is generally identified with a Gupta king, such as Skandagupta or Purugupta. Although the Gupta kings ruled from Pataliputra, Ayodhya was within their domain. However, scholars such as Ashvini Agrawal reject this account as inaccurate.

== Navaratnas ==
In Jyotirvidabharana (22.10), a treatise attributed to Kalidasa, nine noted scholars (the Navaratnas) were at Vikramaditya's court:

1. Vidyasimha
2. Dhanavantari
3. Ghatakarapara
4. Kalidasa
5. Kshapanaka
6. Shanku
7. Varahamihira
8. Vararuchi
9. Vetala Bhatta

However, many scholars consider Jyotirvidabharana a literary forgery written after Kalidasa's death. According to V. V. Mirashi, who dates the work to the 12th century, it could not have been composed by Kalidasa because it contains grammatical errors. There is no mention of such Navaratnas in earlier literature, and D. C. Sircar calls Jyotirvidabharana "absolutely worthless for historical purposes".

There is no historical evidence indicating that the nine scholars were contemporary figures or proteges of the same king. Vararuchi is believed to have lived around the third or fourth century CE. Although Kalidasa's lifetime is debated, most historians place him around the fifth century; Varahamihira is known to have lived in the sixth century. Dhanavantari was the author of a medical glossary (a nighantu), but his lifetime is uncertain. Amarasimha cannot be dated with certainty either, but his lexicon uses works by Dhanavantari and Kalidasa; therefore, he cannot be dated to the first century BCE (Vikramaditya is said to have established an era in 57 BCE). Little is known about Shanku, Vetalabhatta, Kshapanaka and Ghatakarpara. Some Jain writers identify Siddhasena Divakara as Kshapanaka, but this is not accepted by historians.

Kalidasa is the only figure whose association with Vikramaditya is mentioned in works earlier than Jyotirvidabharana. According to Rajasekhara's Kāvyamimāṃsa (10th century), Bhoja's Sringara Prakasa and Kshemendra's Auchitya-Vichara-Charcha (both 11th century), Vikramaditya sent Kalidasa as his ambassador to the Kuntala country (present-day Uttara Kannada). However, the historicity of these reports is doubtful.

== Early legends ==
=== Malava king ===
Rajbali Pandey, Kailash Chand Jain and others believe that Vikramaditya was an Ujjaini based Malava king. The Shakas advanced from Sindh to Malwa around the first century BCE, and were defeated by Vikramaditya. The Krita era, which later came to be known as Vikrama Samvat, marked this victory. Chandragupta II later adopted the title of Vikramaditya after defeating the Shakas. Proponents of this theory say that Vikramaditya is mentioned in works dating to before the Gupta era, including Brihathkatha and Gatha Saptashati. Vikramaditya cannot be based on Chandragupta II, since the Gupta capital was at Pataliputra (not Ujjain). According to Raj Pruthi, legends surrounding this first-century king gradually became intertwined with those of later kings called "Vikramaditya" (including Chandragupta II).

Critics of this theory say that Gatha Saptashati shows clear signs of Gupta-era interpolation. According to A. K. Warder, Brihatkathamanjari and Kathasaritsagara are "enormously inflated and deformed" recensions of the original Brihatkatha. The early Jain works do not mention Vikramaditya and the navaratnas have no historical basis as the nine scholars do not appear to have been contemporary figures. Legends surrounding Vikramaditya are contradictory, border on the fantastic and are inconsistent with historical facts; no epigraphic, numismatic or literary evidence suggests the existence of a king with the name (or title) of Vikramaditya around the first century BCE. Although the Puranas contain genealogies of significant Indian kings, they do not mention a Vikramaditya ruling from Ujjain or Pataliputra before the Gupta era. There is little possibility of an historically-unattested, powerful emperor ruling from Ujjain around the first century BCE among the Shungas (187–78 BCE), the Kanvas (75–30 BCE), the Satavahanas (230 BCE–220 CE), the Shakas (c. 200 BCE – c. 400 CE) and the Indo-Greeks (180 BCE–10 CE).

=== Gupta kings ===
A number of Gupta Empire kings adopted the title of Vikramaditya or its equivalent, such as Samudragupta's "Parakramanka". According to D. C. Sircar, Hem Chandra Raychaudhuri and others, the exploits of these kings contributed to the Vikramaditya legends. Distinctions among them were lost over time, and the legendary Shalivahana was similarly based on the exploits of several Satavahana kings.

==== Chandragupta II ====
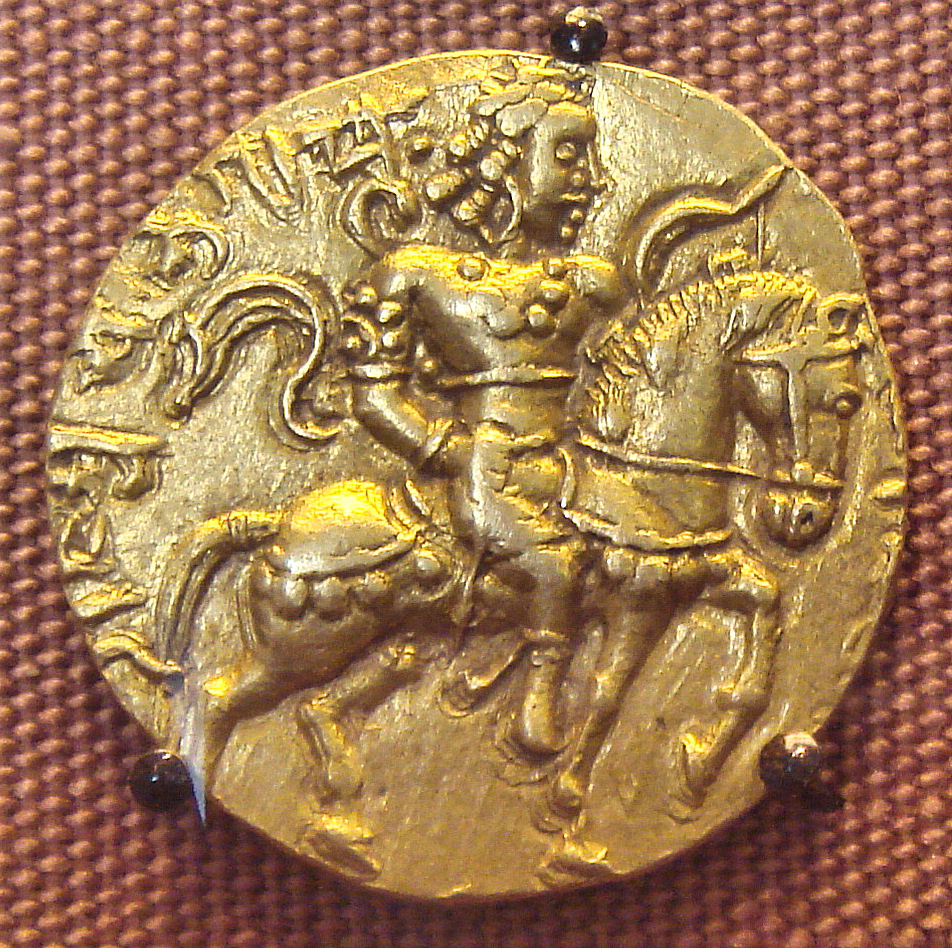
Chandragupta II on a coin

Some scholars, including D. R. Bhandarkar, V. V. Mirashi and D. C. Sircar, believe that Vikramaditya is probably based on the Gupta king Chandragupta II. Based on coins and the Supia pillar inscription, it is believed that Chandragupta II adopted the title Vikramaditya. The Khambat and Sangli plates of the Rashtrakuta king Govinda IV use the epithet "Sahasanka", which has also been applied to Vikramaditya, for Chandragupta II. According to Alf Hiltebeitel, Chandragupta's victory against the Shakas was transposed to a fictional character who is credited with establishing the Vikrama Samvat era.

In most of the legends Vikramaditya had his capital at Ujjain, although some mention him as king of Pataliputra (the Gupta capital). According to D. C. Sircar, Chandragupta II may have defeated the Shaka invaders of Ujjain and made his son, Govindagupta, a viceroy there. Ujjain may have become a second Gupta capital, and legends about him (as Vikramaditya) may have developed. The Guttas of Guttavalal, a minor dynasty based in present-day Karnataka, claimed descent from the Gupta Empire. Their Chaudadanapura inscription alludes to Vikramaditya ruling from Ujjain, and several Gutta kings were named Vikramaditya. According to Vasundhara Filliozat, the Guttas confused Vikramaditya with Chandragupta II; however, D. C. Sircar sees this as further proof that Vikramaditya was based on Chandragupta II.

==== Skandagupta ====
The Vikramaditya of Ayodhya legend is identified as Skandagupta (r. 455 – 467 CE) by a number of scholars. Book 18 of the Kathasaritsagara describes Vikramaditya as a son of Mahendraditya of Ujjain. According to D.C. Sircar, Kumaragupta I (r. 415–455 CE) adopted the title Mahendraditya. His son, Skandagupta, adopted the title Vikramaditya, and this set of legends may be based on Skandagupta.

=== Other rulers ===
In the Kathasaritsagara recension of the 25 vetala stories, the king is mentioned as the ruler of Pratishthana. A. K. Warder notes that the Satavahanas were the only notable ancient dynasty who ruled from Pratishthana. According to a Satavahana inscription, their king Gautamiputra Satakarni defeated the Shakas. One of Gautamiputra Satakarni's epithets was vara-varana-vikrama-charu-vikrama. However, according to D. C. Sircar, the epithet means "one whose gait is as beautiful as that of a choice elephant" and is unrelated to Vikramaditya. Most other Vikramaditya legends note the king's capital as Ujjain (or, less commonly, Pataliputra), but the Satavahanas never had their capital at these cities. Vikramaditya was also described as an adversary of the Pratishthana-based king Satavahana (or Shalivahana) in a number of legends.

Max Müller believed that the Vikramaditya legends were based on the sixth-century Aulikara king Yashodharman. The Aulikaras used the Malava era (later known as Vikrama Samvat) in their inscriptions. According to Rudolf Hoernlé, the name of the Malava era was changed to Vikramaditya by Yashodharman. Hoernlé also believed that Yashodharman conquered Kashmir and is the Harsha Vikramaditya mentioned in Kalhana's Rajatarangini. Although Yashodharman defeated the Hunas (who were led by Mihirakula), the Hunas were not the Shakas; Yashodharman's capital was at Dasapura (modern Mandsaur), not Ujjain. There is no other evidence that he inspired the Vikramaditya legends.

== Legacy ==
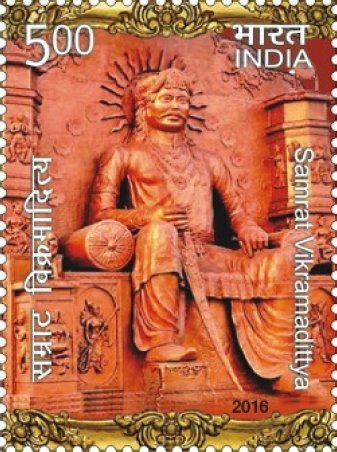
Stamp of India 2016 Samrat Vikramaditya

Several Vikramaditya stories appear in the Amar Chitra Katha comic-book series. Indian films on king Vikramaditya include G. V. Sane's Vikram Satvapariksha (1921), Nanubhai B. Desai's Vikram Charitra (1924), Harshadrai Sakerlal Mehta's Vikram Charitra (1933), Vikram Shashikala (1949), Vijay Bhatt's Vikramaditya (1945), Kemparaj Urs' Raja Vikrama (1950), Dhirubhai Desai's Raja Vikram (1957), Chandrasekhara Rao Jampana's Bhatti Vikramarka (1960), T. R. Raghunath's Vikramaadhithan (1962), Chakravarty Vikramaditya (1964), S. N. Tripathi's Maharaja Vikram (1965), G. Suryam's Vikramarka Vijayam (1971), Shantilal Soni's Vikram Vetal (1986), Krishna's Simhasanam and Singhasan (1986), Ravi Raja Pinisetty's Raja Vikramarka (1990), Rajiv Chilakalapudi's Vikram Betal (2004).

Vikram Aur Betaal, which appeared on Doordarshan in the 1980s, was based on Vetala Panchavimshati. Kahaniya Vikram aur Betaal Ki, a remake of the Doordarshan television show, aired on Colors TV in 2009. An adaptation of Singhasan Battisi was aired on Doordarshan during the late 1980s. In 2014, another adaptation was aired on Sony Pal. Currently a series Vikram Betaal Ki Rahasya Gatha is running on &TV where popular actor Aham Sharma is playing the role of Vikramaditya.

The Indian Navy aircraft carrier INS Vikramaditya was named in honour of Vikramaditya. On 22 December 2016, a commemorative postage stamp honouring Samrat Vikramadittya was released by India Post. Historical-fiction author Shatrujeet Nath retells the emperor's story in his Vikramaditya Veergatha series.

=== Association with Vikrama Samvat ===
After the ninth century, a calendar era beginning in 57 BCE (now called the Vikrama Samvat) began to be associated with Vikramaditya; some legends also associate the Shaka era (beginning in 78 CE) with him. When Persian scholar Al-Biruni (973–1048) visited India, he learned that the Indians used five eras: Sri Harsha, Vikramaditya (57 BCE), Shaka (78 CE), Vallabha and Gupta. The Vikramaditya era was used in southern and western India. Al-Biruni learned the following legend about the Shaka era:

A Shaka ruler invaded north-western India and oppressed the Hindus. According to one source, he was a Shudra from the Almanṣūra city; according to another, he was a non-Hindu who came from the west. In 78 CE, the Hindu king Vikramaditya defeated him and killed him in the Karur region, located between Multan and the castle of Loni. The astronomers and other people started using this date as the beginning of a new era.

Since there was a difference of over 130 years between the Vikramaditya era and the Shaka era, Al-Biruni concluded that their founders were two kings with the same name. The Vikramaditya era named after the first, and the Shaka era was associated with the defeat of the Shaka ruler by the second Vikramaditya.

According to several later legends—particularly Jain legends—Vikramaditya established the 57 BCE era after he defeated the Shakas and was defeated in turn by Shalivahana, who established the 78 CE era. Both legends are historically inaccurate. There is a difference of 135 years between the beginning of the two eras, and Vikramaditya and Shalivahana could not have lived simultaneously. The association of the era beginning in 57 BCE with Vikramaditya is not found in any source before the ninth century. Earlier sources call this era by several names, including "Kṛṭa", "the era of the Malava tribe", or "Samvat" ("Era"). Scholars such as D. C. Sircar and D. R. Bhandarkar believe that the name of the era changed to Vikrama Samvat during the reign of Chandragupta II, who had adopted the title of "Vikramaditya" (see below). Alternative theories also exist, and Rudolf Hoernlé believed that it was Yashodharman who renamed the era Vikrama Samvat. The earliest mention of the Shaka era as the Shalivahana era occurs in the 13th century, and may have been an attempt to remove the era's foreign association.
