= Vikram Vetal =

- Directed by: Shantilal Soni
- Starring: Deepika; Anjana Mumtaz; Satish Shah
- Music by: Nadeem-Shravan
- Release date: 1986
- Country: India
- Language: Hindi

Vikram Vetal is a 1986 Indian Hindi-language fantasy film directed by Shantilal Soni, starring Vikram Gokhale, Manhar Desai, Deepika Chikhalia and Satish Shah. It is based on the Baital Pachisi, a collection of Indian fairy tales and legends about King Vikramaditya and the Vetala.

== Soundtrack ==
1. "Tera Badan Tera Yauvan" – Shabbir Kumar
