= Bharthari (king) =

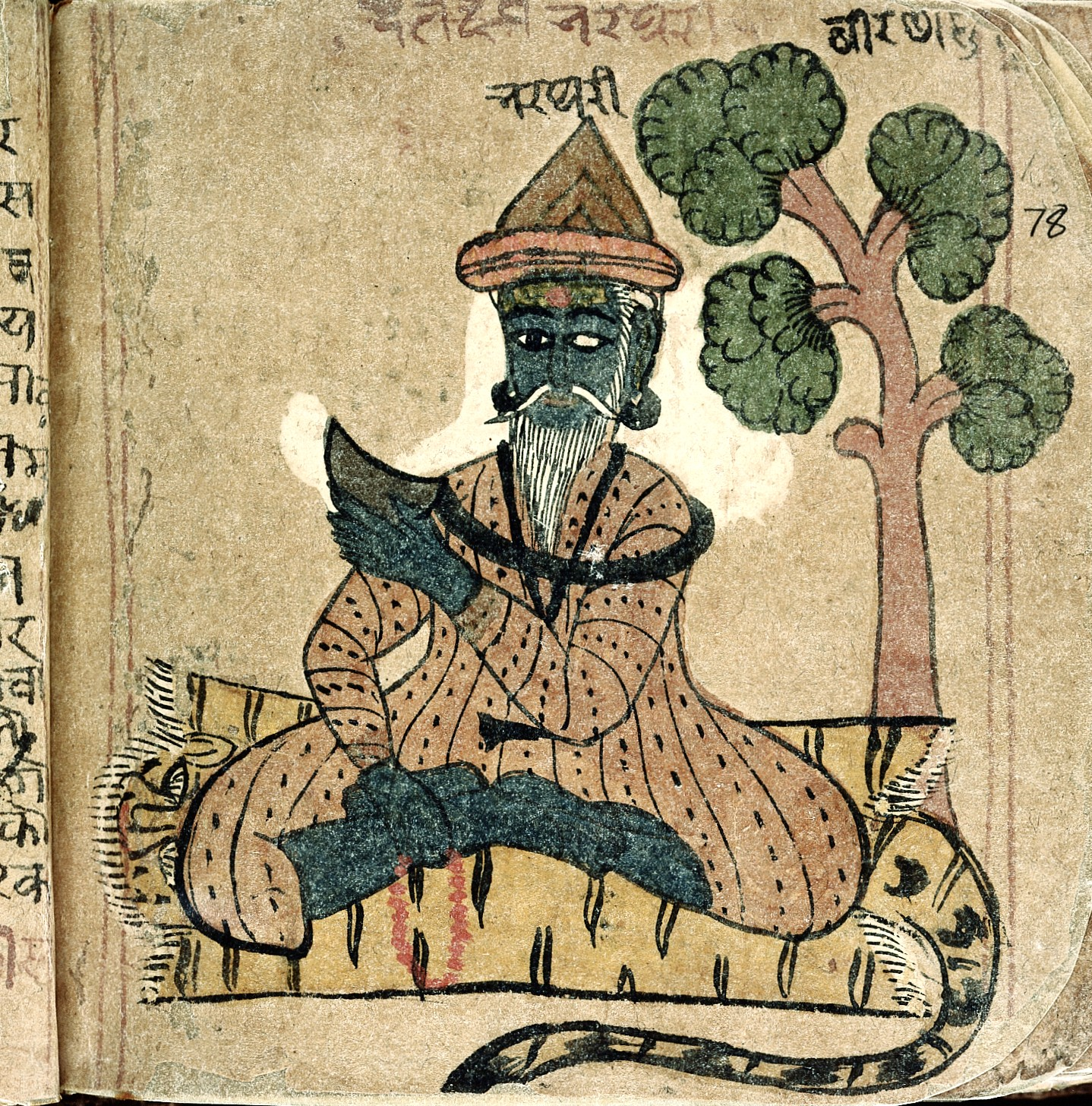
- Illustrated manuscript depiction of Bharthari Nath, ca.1715

In-universe information
- Gender: Male
- Title: Raja
- Occupation: King
- Spouse: Queen Pingala
- Relatives: King Gandharva-Sena, King Gopi Chand, Vikramaditya
- Religion: Hinduism
- Nationality: Indian

Bharatthari is the hero of many folk stories in North India. He was the King of Ujjain, before renouncing the world and abdicating in the favor of his younger brother Vikramaditya. He was based on a historical figure named Bhartrihari.

Stories of Bharthari and his nephew King Gopi Chand of Bengal, who are considered Nath panth yogis, abound in the Indian folklore of Rajasthan, Punjab, Gujarat, Haryana, Bihar, Uttar Pradesh, Chhattisgarh and West Bengal.

Many of the details about the lives of Bharthari and his brother Vikramaditya are from the tales of Baital Pachisi (Twenty five tales of Baital), translated as 'Vikram and The Vampire' by Sir Richard Francis Burton in 1870.

== Folklore ==
Bhartrhari was the elder son of King Gandharva Sena, who received the kingdom of Ujjain from The celestial god Indra and the King of Dhara.

When Bhartrhari was king of 'Ujjayani' (modern day Ujjain), there lived a Brahman who got the fruit of immortality from the celestial wish granting tree, Kalpavriksha, as a result of long austerity. He decided to offer it to King Bhartrhari. The king wanted his beloved queen, Pinglah or Ananga Sena (as per Maha Kavi Kalidas), to be youthful, and thus gifted her the fruit. Raja Bhartrhari's last and youngest wife. However, the queen had a secret love affair with army chief Mahipaala, she desired him to be immortal and the enchanted fruit was given to him, he in turn passed it to his beloved, 'Lakha' the head mistress. Eventually, the fruit returned to the king. Having completed the circle, the fruit revealed the downsides of infidelity to the king, he summoned the queen and ordered her beheading, and ate the fruit himself. After that he abdicated the throne, to his younger brother Vikramaditya, and became a religious mendicant.

He later became a disciple of Pattinathar (Swetharanyar or Pattinathu chettiyar is poorvashram name of this saint from Poompuhar, Tamil Nadu) who first indulged in an argument about samsari and sanyasi with king Bhartrhari later during the conversation Pattinathar said that all women have 'dual mind' and it might be the true case even with parameswari. King conveyed this news to rani Pingalah and she ordered Pattinathar to get punished and to sit in 'kalu maram' (Tree, whose top portion would be sharpened like a pencil and whole tree is fully painted with oil, person who are allowed to sit in the top will split into 2 pieces), they tried pattinathar but kalu maram started burning and nothing happened to Pattinathar, the king came to know this news and went directly to Pattinathar and asked him to get ready to die the next day, but Pattinathar replied I'm ready even now to die. The next day king came with tears in his eyes and released saint from jail because he actually noticed queen pingalah in love with horsemen that night, He threw away his empire, wealth, even his full dress coat and dressed in a simple loin cloth. The king became a disciple of Pattinathar and got mukthi (salvation) in the Kalahasthi temple. Bharthari wrote a collection of Tamil poetic verses called Meignana Pulambal.

There is a very famous song sung by the bards of Chhattisgarh in the memory of Raja Bhartrhari. The story says that Queen Pingala and Raja Bhartrhari did not have a son and the queen was very sad as a result of that. A saint came to the door of their palace one day and asked for alms. When Rani Pinglaa went down to give him alms, he said, "I know you are sad and I have brought some holy water for you. If you drink this water with faith, you will have a son in twelve months' time." Rani Pingala had the water and as promised by the Yogi, she had a son after twelve months.

There is one more very interesting story related to Raja Bhartrhari and Rani Pingla. It is said that Raja Bhartrhari was out for a hunt one day and he saw a woman jump into the pyre of her husband (Sati) as her grief would not let her stay alive. Raja Bhartrhari was moved and this incident stayed in his mind. When he returned to his palace, he told the story to Rani Pingala and asked her if she would do the same. Rani Pingala said that she would die on hearing the news itself and there would be no chance of her staying alive until the funeral ceremony. Raja Bhartrhari decided to test her and went on a hunt once again and sent the news of his death back to the palace. The Mahaaraani died on hearing the news as she had promised and Raja Bhrithari was grief-stricken. Guru Gorakhnath heard about the grief of the King and came to help him overcome his grief. It is said that Guru Gorakhnath created 750 copies of Rani Pingala to demonstrate the illusory nature of the world to Raja Bhartrhari. Even though Rani Pingala was brought back to life, Raja Bharthari decided to renounce the world and became a follower of Guru Gorakhnath. He became a very famous saint and is also known as Sant Bhartrhari by the people of North India. Bhratahari is famous in Alwar of Rajasthan. Ashtami is the worship day celebrated as a festival. The fair of bhratahari is grouped by lakhs of people of Alwar, Jaipur, Dausa near Sariska in Alwar.
