= Gardabhilla =

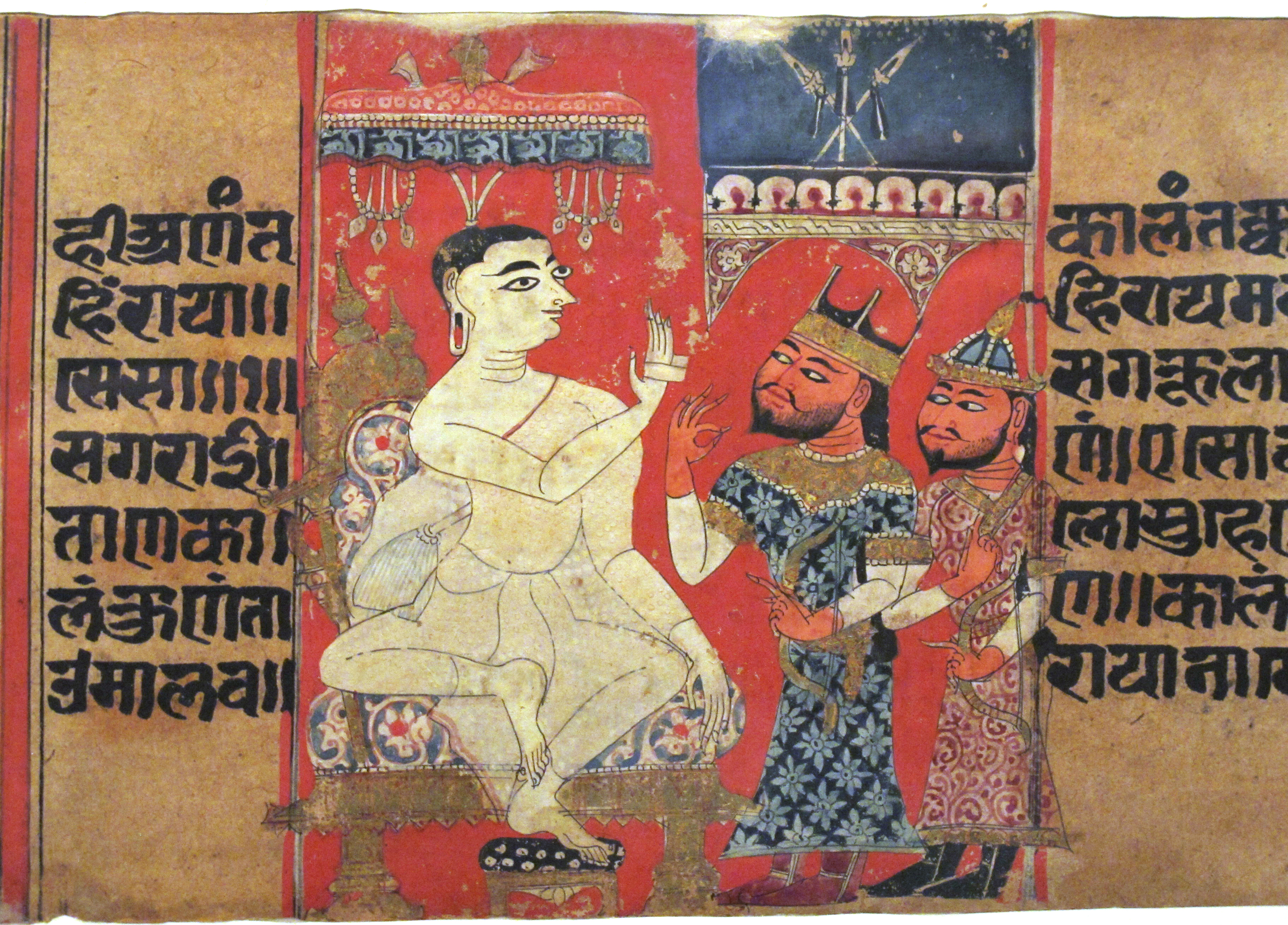
- The Jain Monk Kālakā, the victorious Saka king, and the captive king Gardabhilla, Kalpasutra, c. 1375 CE

King of Ujjain
- Reign: 1st century BC
- Successor: Vikramaditya

Gardabhilla, who was believed to be the father of a legendary ruler, Vikramaditya, was a king of Ujjain in the first century BC.

== Life ==
He is said to have kidnapped the sister of Kalakacharya II (a Jain monk). According to Merutunga's Vicarasreni, he rose to power in 74 BCE and was defeated by Sakas in 61 BCE.
