= Three Crowned Kings =

Monarchs in Ancient Tamilakam

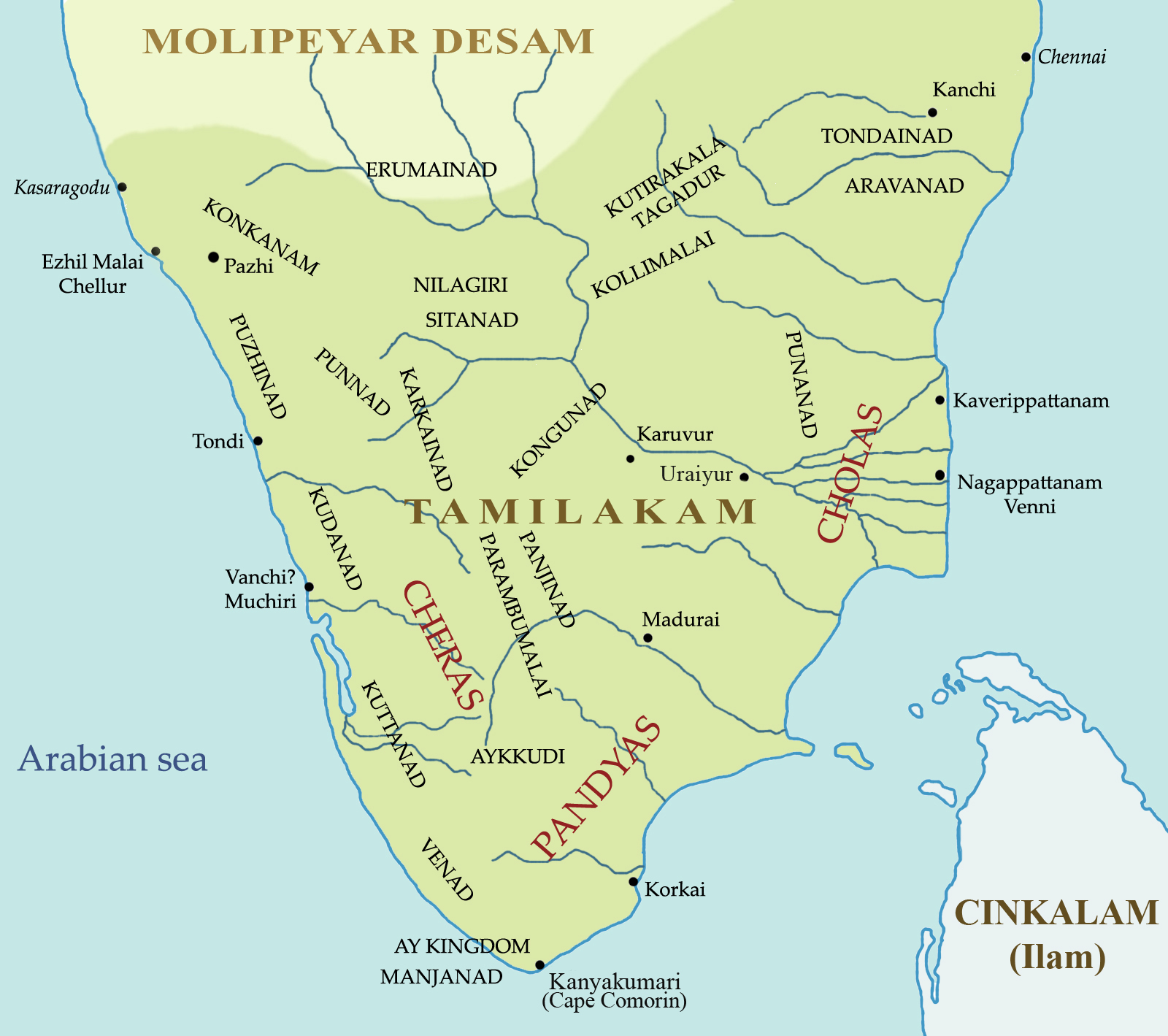
Tamilakam in the 'Sangam Period.

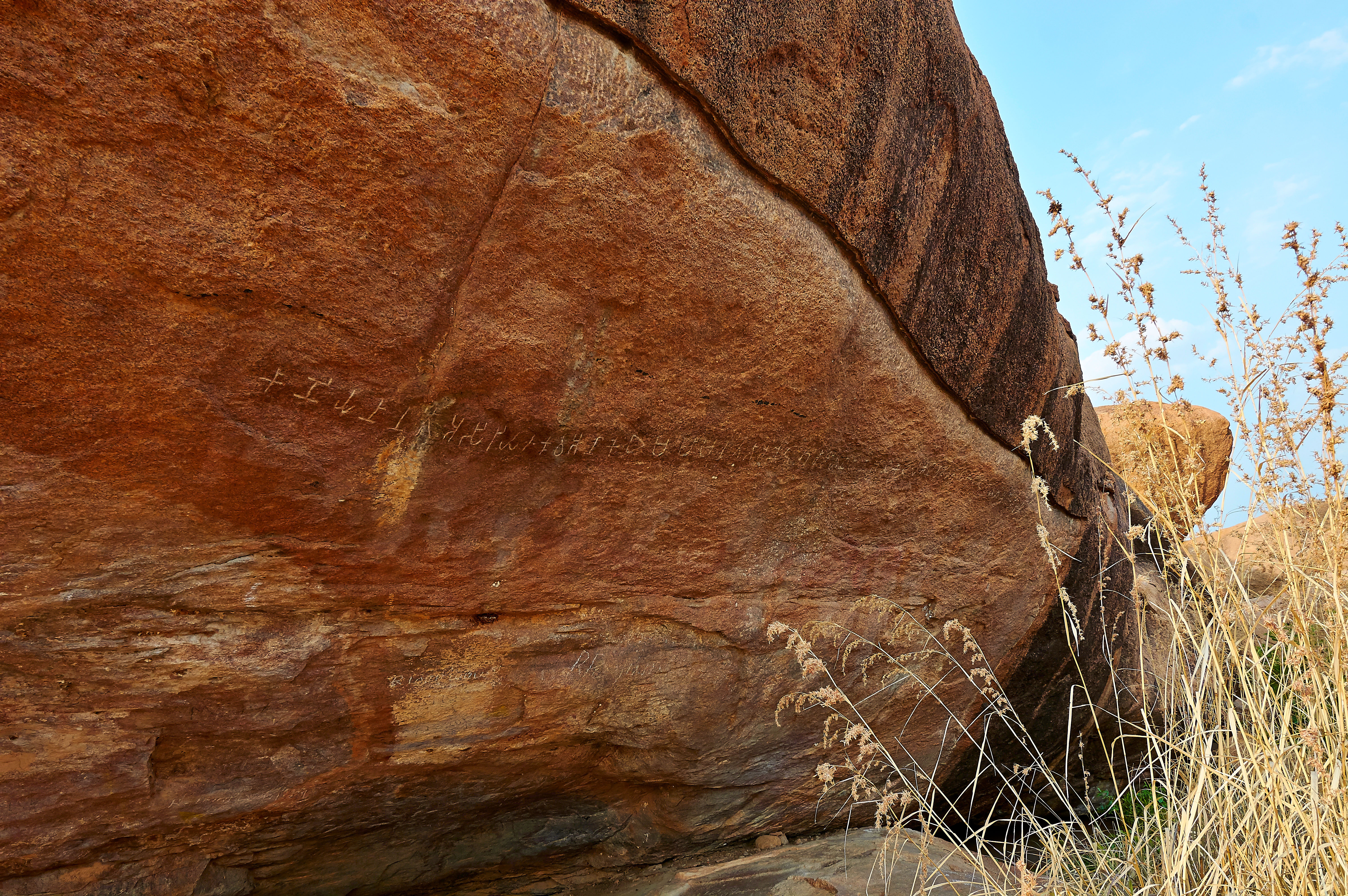
Mangulam Inscription

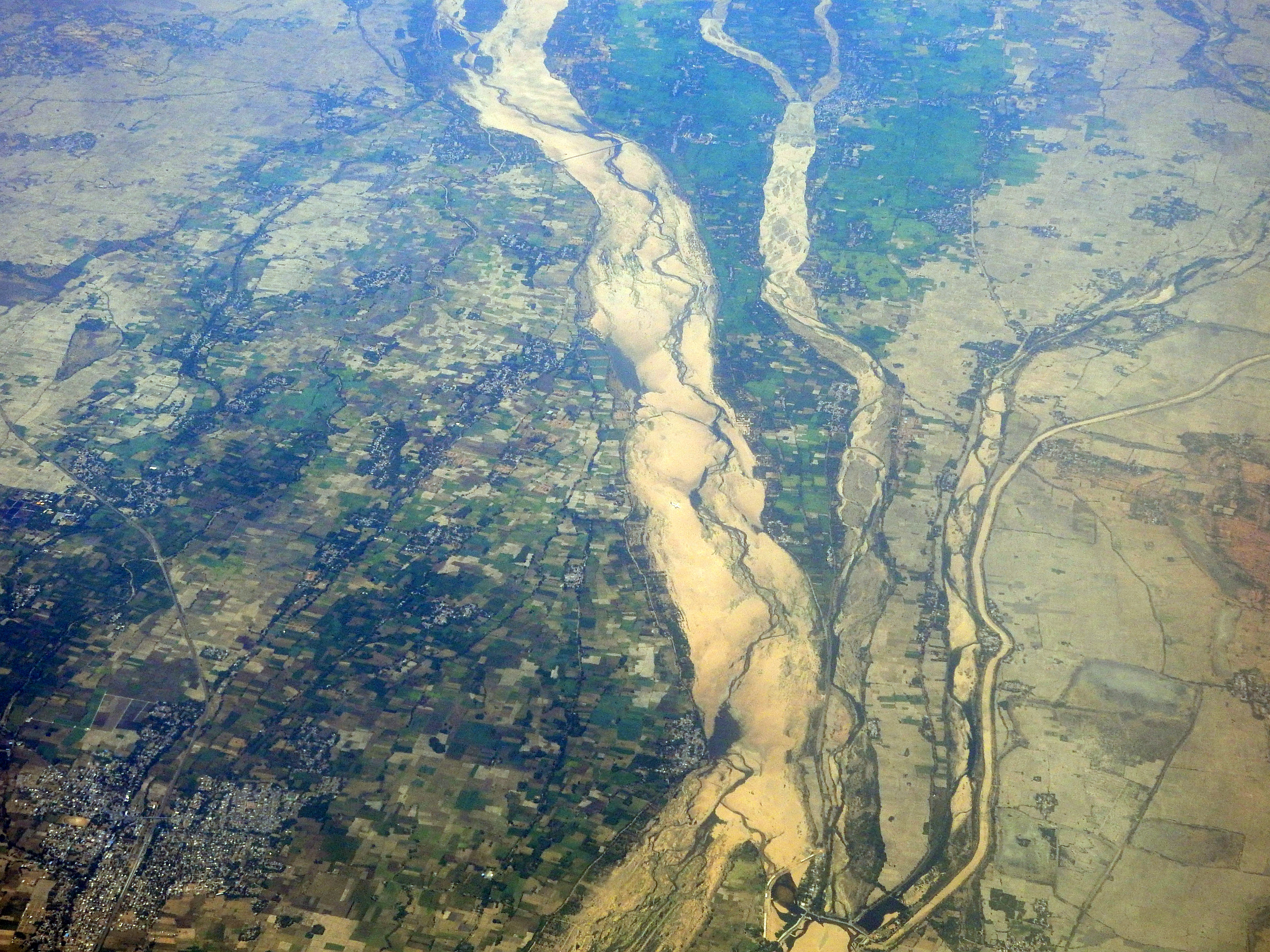
Kaveri River

The Three Crowned Kings, (Note: Also known as the Three Glorified by Heaven, World of the Three The Tamil Kings, or Muvendar.) also known as the Muvendar were the triumvirate of Chera, Chola and Pandya who dominated the politics of the ancient Tamil kingdom, Tamilakam, from their three Nadu (kingdoms) of Chola Nadu, Pandya Nadu (present day Madurai and Tirunelveli) and Chera Nadu (present day Kerala and some parts of Tamil Nadu) in southern India. They signalled a time of integration and political identity for the Tamil people. They frequently waged war against one another under a period of instability and between each other, held control over Greater Tamilakam from 6th century BCE to the 13th century. After being defeated by the Pandyas, the Cholas fled to Devicottah and are later mentioned in various texts that participated in wars in the 16th century.

== Origins ==
The etymology of the Tamil word for the three kings – Moovendhar (pronounced Mūvēntar) – comes from Tamil: மூ, romanized: mū, lit. 'three' and Tamil: வேந்தர், romanized: vēntar, lit. 'kings'. They are mentioned by Megasthenes and the Edicts of Ashoka, and first in Tolkappiyam among Tamil literature which was the first to call them "Three Glorified by Heaven" (Tamil: வான்புகழ் மூவர், Vāṉpukaḻ Mūvar). Ptolemy and the Periplus of the Erythraean Sea mention three kingdoms ruling Tamilakam.

== Pandyas ==
The seats of Muvendhas lie in the modern states of Kerala and Tamil Nadu

The Pandyas were the earliest of the Muvendhar and were of high antiquity being mentioned by Kātyāyana and Valmiki. However the establishment of a Pandya territory is not known until the sixth century under King Kadungon who liberated the Pandya kingdom from the Kalabhras. Xuanzang reports that Jainism was flourishing while Buddhism was declining during this period. They were famous for being patrons of the Tamil Sangams which were held in their capital, Madurai. Pliny mentions the Pandya kingdom and its capital. The large number of Roman coins from Emperor Augustus to Emperor Zeno found in Madurai shows that trade flourished among Rome, Greece and Tamilakam. Two embassies sent from the Pandya dynasty to Emperor Augustus were recorded. The Roman and Greek writers praise Korkai (now called Tuticorin or Thoothukudi) as the seaport of the Pandyas.

== Cholas ==
The Cholas were a prominent dynasty in South India, and they played a significant role in the Sangam Age, which is generally considered to span from 300 BCE to 1297 CE. During this period, the Cholas engaged in extensive trade both within the Indian subcontinent and with foreign regions. Their trading activities helped them amass wealth, expand their influence, and contribute to the growth of their kingdom.

The Cholas had a well-developed maritime trade network, which allowed them to establish trade links with various regions, including Southeast Asia, Sri Lanka, the Arabian Peninsula, and East Africa. They possessed a strong navy and used it to protect their trade routes and maintain control over the seas. Their trading activities were not limited to goods but also extended to cultural and intellectual exchanges.

One of the key commodities in Chola trade was spices. They actively participated in the spice trade, importing and exporting various spices such as pepper, cardamom, cinnamon, and ginger. The Cholas also traded in other valuable commodities like precious stones, pearls, textiles, ivory, and perfumes. They were known for their craftsmanship and exported exquisite bronze sculptures, pottery, and textiles, which were highly sought after in foreign markets.

== Cheras ==
The Chera dynasty was another prominent power during the Sangam Age (early historic period) in South India, alongside the Chola and Pandya dynasties. The Chera kingdom, associated with present-day central Kerala and western Tamil Nadu (the Kongu region), had a significant impact on trade and the broader economy of the period.

The Cheras were especially known for their extensive maritime trade. They controlled important ports along the Malabar Coast, including Muziris (possibly modern-day Kodungallur), and Tyndis. These ports functioned as major hubs for international commerce, attracting merchants from various parts of the world, particularly from the Middle East.

The Chera kingdom played a crucial role in the highly lucrative spice trade. It was actively involved in the export of valuable spices such as black pepper, cardamom, cinnamon, and ginger. These commodities were in high demand in the Roman Empire and other western markets, and the Cheras appear to have capitalized on this demand to accumulate substantial wealth.

In addition to spices, the people of the Malabar Coast also traded in other valuable goods, including ivory, pearls, textiles, precious stones, and forest products. With access to the abundant natural resources of the Western Ghats and the forests of Kerala, they were able to export timber, teak, sandalwood, and medicinal herbs—many of which were highly sought after in Middle Eastern markets.

== Literature ==
The Silappatikaram alludes to the solar ancestry of the Cholas and the lunar ancestry of the Pandyas. It does not mention anything about the ancestry of the Cheras. The 15th-century Tamil Mahabharata of Villiputtur Alvar describes the Chera king as from the fire dynasty, retaining the solar and lunar origins for the Chola and the Pandya kings, respectively. The Tiruvilayatar Puranam (or Thiruvilaiyadal Puranam), possibly from the 17th century, also states that when Brahma re-created the world after a deluge, he created the Chera, Chola and the Pandya kings as descendants of the fire, the sun and the moon, respectively.

Chola Purva Patayam ("Ancient Chola Record"), a Tamil language manuscript of uncertain date, contains a legend about the divine origin of the three crowned kings. According to it, the Shramana king Shalivahana (also known as Bhoja in this story) defeated Vikramaditya, and started persecuting the worshipers of Shiva and Vishnu. After failing to kill Shalivahana with a rain of fire, Shiva created three kings: Vira Cholan (Chola), Ula Cheran (Chera), and Vajranga Pandiyan (Pandya). The three kings came to bathe together at the triveni sangam (three-river confluence) in Thirumukkoodal, and formed an alliance against Shalivahana. Next, they went through a number of adventures at various places, including Kashi and Kanchi. With the blessings of Durga, they found treasure and inscriptions of Hindu kings from the age of Shantanu to Vikramaditya. They then reached Cudatturiyur (possibly Uraiyur), where Vira Cholan wrote letters to all those who worshipped Shiva and Vishnu, seeking their help against Shalivahana. A number of people assembled at Cudatturiyur to support the three kings' campaign. When Shalivahana heard of this preparation, he marched towards the south and took possession of the strong citadel at Tiruchirappalli. The three kings sent their envoy to Shalivahana, asking him to surrender and renounce his faith. When he refused, they and their allies assembled an army at Thiruvanaikaval. From an inscription that they had earlier found at Kanchi, they realised that there was a subterranean entrance into the Tiruchirappalli fort. They sent a few soldiers who entered the fort and opened its Chintamani gate. Their forces then entered the fortress, and defeated Shalivahana. Chola Purva Patayam dates Shalivahana's defeat to the year 1443 of an uncertain calendar era (possibly from the beginning of Kali Yuga).
