= Shalivahana =

Legendary Indian monarch

Shalivahana (IAST: Śālivāhana) was a legendary emperor of ancient India, who is said to have ruled from Pratishthana (present-day Paithan, Maharashtra). He is believed to be based on a Satavahana king (or kings).

There are several contradictory legends about him. Most legends associate him with another legendary emperor, Vikramaditya of Ujjain, in some way. In some legends, he is presented as an enemy of Vikramaditya; in other legends, he is named as a grandson of Vikramaditya; and in a few legends, the title Vikramaditya is applied to the ruler of Pratishthana. According to some historically inaccurate legends, his birth or one of his battle victories marked the beginning of the Shalivahana calendar era, which is another name for the Saka era.

== Legends ==
=== Viracharita ===
Ananta's heroic poem Viracharita (12th century CE) mentions Shalivahana as a rival of the king Vikramaditya of Ujjain. According to it, Shalivahana defeated and killed Vikramaditya, and then ruled from Pratishthana. Shudraka was a close associate of Shalivahana and his son Shakti Kumara. Later, Shudraka allied with Vikramaditya's successors and defeated Shakti Kumara. This legend is full of unreliable mythological stories.

=== Bhavishya Purana ===
Paramara-era legends associate the Paramara rulers with legendary kings, in order to enhance the Paramara imperial claims. In the Bhavishya Purana, the Paramara king Bhoja is described as a descendant of Shalivahana, who is named as a grandson of Vikramaditya. According to the text (3.1.6.45-7.4), the first Paramara king was Pramara, born from a fire pit at Mount Abu (thus belonging to the Agnivansha). Vikramaditya, Shalivahana, and Bhoja are described as the descendants of Pramara, and thus, members of the Paramara dynasty.

Bhavishya Purana mentions that Vikramaditya ruled Bharatavarsha (India) bounded by Indus River in the west, Badaristhana (Badrinath) in the north, Kapila in the east, and Setubandha (Rameswaram) in the south. A hundred years after his death, many languages and many religions had developed in the 18 kingdoms of the Aryadesha (country of the Aryas). When the outsiders such as the Śakas heard about the destruction of dharma (righteousness, law and order) in Aryadesha, they raided the country by crossing the Indus and the Himalayas. They plundered Aryas and returned to their countries with the wives of the Aryas. Shalivahana, the grandson of Vikramaditya, then subjugated the Śakas and other barbarians. He defined the maryada to distinguish the Aryans from the mlecchas, and established Indus as the border between the Aryan lands and the land of the mlecchas.

Subsequently, Shalivahana once came to a snowy mountain in the land of the Hunas. There, he met Isamasi (Jesus Christ), who had appeared because the truth had been destroyed in the land of the mlecchas. Shalivahana bowed to him and then returned home. In Aryadesha, he performed an ashvamedha sacrifice, and then ascended to the heaven. 500 years after Shalivahana, his descendant Bhoja also fought against foreign invaders, including "Mahamada", a character modeled on Muhammad and possibly Mahamud Ghazanvi.

The text presents the doctrine of Jesus as consistent with the Vedic dharma, while Muhammad is presented as demonic. According to Theodor Aufrecht, the passages about Jesus were inserted by an employee of the Venkatesvara Press, which published its first printed edition of the text in 1897. According to Giorgio Bonazzoli, this part was inserted by "some clever pandit" in the 19th century.

=== Chola Purva Patayam ===
The Chola Purva Patayam ("Ancient Chola Record"), a Tamil language manuscript of uncertain date, contains the following legend about Shalivahana (also known as Bhoja in this story):

Shalivahana was born in Ayodhya, in a potter's house, by the grace of Shesha. When he grew up, he became a king and defeated Vikramaditya, marking the beginning of the Shalivahana calendar era. Shalivahana was an alien Nastika Shramana (possibly a Jain), and persecuted all those who refused to convert to his faith. He revoked all the privileges that the Hindus had received from Vikramaditya. The non-Shramana ascetics started retiring to wilderness, and prayed to Shiva and Vishnu to stop the new king's atrocities.

Shiva then appealed to the Para Brahman (the supreme being) to be allowed to start a rain of fire in Shalivahana's kingdom. Shesha appeared in Shalivahana's dream and warned him about the upcoming disaster. Shalivahana asked his people to build stone houses or hide in the river (Kaveri) to escape the rain of fire. When Shiva opened his third eye and started raining fire, the people survived thanks to Shalivahana's advice. Shiva then sent down a rain of mud. Those hiding in the stone houses suffocated to death, as the mud blocked the openings. Those hiding in the rivers, including Shalivahana and his army, survived.

To destroy Shalivahana, Shiva now created the Three Crowned Kings: Vira Cholan, Ula Cheran, and Vajranga Pandyan. The three kings came to bathe together at the Triveni Sangam (three-river confluence) in Thirumukkoodal, and formed an alliance against Shalivahana. Next, they went through a number of adventures at various places, including Kashi and Kanchi. With the blessings of Durga, they found treasure and inscriptions of Hindu kings from the age of Shantanu to Vikramaditya. They then reached Cudatturiyur (possibly Uraiyur), where Vira Cholan wrote letters to all those who worshipped Shiva and Vishnu, seeking their help against Shalivahana. A number of people assembled at Cudatturiyur to support the three kings' campaign. When Shalivahana heard of this preparation, he marched towards the south and took possession of the strong citadel at Tiruchirappalli.

The three kings sent their envoy to Shalivahana, asking him to surrender and renounce his faith. When he refused, they and their allies assembled an army at Thiruvanaikaval. From an inscription that they had earlier found at Kanchi, they realized that there was a subterranean entry into the Tiruchirappalli fort. They sent a few soldiers who entered the fort and opened its Chintamani gate. Their forces then entered the fortress, and defeated Shalivahana. The Chola Purva Patayam dates Shalivahana's defeat to the year 1443 of an uncertain calendar era (possibly from the beginning of the Kali Yuga).

=== Others ===
Jain scholar Hemachandra (12th century) names Shalivahana among the four learned kings. Another Jain writer, Jina Prabhu Suri, mentions him in Kalpa Pradipa. In some of the legends that present Shalivahana and Vikramaditya as rivals, their political rivalry is extended to patronage of language, with Vikramaditya supporting Sanskrit and Shalivahana supporting Prakrit.

== Shalivahana era ==
According to some historically inaccurate legends, one of Shalivahana's victories marked the beginning of the Saka era (also known as "Shalivahana era"). The earliest association of Shalivahana with the era beginning in 78 CE is found in the Kannada language work Udbhatakavya by Somaraja (1222 CE). The next earliest association is found in the Tasgaon plates (1251 CE) of the Yadava king Krishna. Some works, such as Muhurta-Martanda suggest that this era starts from Shalivahana's birth. Others, such as Kalpa-Pradipa (c. 1300 CE) of Jinaprabha Suri, suggest that the era marks Shalivahana's victory over Vikramaditya.

Dineshchandra Sircar suggests that the association of the northern king Vikramaditya with the Vikrama era (also historically inaccurate) might have led the southern scholars to fabricate a similar legend of their own. An attempt to forget the foreign association of the era's name might have been another factor. Shalivahanas belong to the Kulala caste.

The Shalivahana Era is started by the Shalivahana king, who is the grandson of the legendary king Vikramaditya. Chandramana is adopted in the Shalivahana Era. Chandramana is the easiest one compared to Suryamana.

== Historicity ==
Many of the legends about Shalivahana feature fantasy and mythical elements, but some scholars believe that he is based on a historical figure (or figures). According to scholars such as Moriz Winternitz and K. R. Subramanian, Shalivahana is same as Satavahana, and was a generic family name or title of the Satavahana kings. According to D. C. Sircar, the legendary "Shalivahana" was based on the exploits of multiple Satavahana kings; the legendary Vikramaditya was also based on multiple kings, and the distinction between these individual kings was lost over time. He believes the historically inaccurate notion that the "Shalivahana era" was based on the victory of the Satavahana ruler Gautamiputra Satakarni over some Saka (Western Kshatrapa) kings.

Literary works such as Prabodha Chintamani and Chaturavinshati Prabandha suggest that Shalivahana composed 400,000 gathas (single-verse poems). Gatha Saptashati, compiled by the Satvahana king Hāla, contains 700 verses in Maharashtri Prakrit. For this reason, Hāla is identified as Shalivahana. Although Jain chroniclers claim that he was a Jain, this does not appear to be correct, as the work invokes Shiva. Kathasaritsagara (based on the now-lost Brihatkatha) also contains some legends about a king named Satavahana, but this king is obviously different from Hāla.
