= Sinhasan Battisi (TV series) =

2014 Indian television series

- Genre: Adventure; Fantasy; Drama
- Based on: Singhasan Battisi
- Written by: C.L.Saini
- Screenplay by: C.L.Saini
- Directed by: Arif Ali Ansari
- Creative directors: Alind Shirivastva, DrNameeta Sharma
- Starring: See below
- Country of origin: India
- Original language: Hindi

Production
- Producer: Dheeraj Kumar
- Production locations: Mumbai; India
- Camera setup: Multi-camera
- Running time: 20-22 minutes
- Production company: Creative Eye Limited

Original release
- Network: Sony Pal
- Release: 1 September 2014 – 13 February 2015

Sinhasan Battisi is an Indian Hindi-language adventure and fantasy television series that aired on Sony Pal. The show is based on folktales of Singhasan Battisi. The show stars Karan Suchak, Siddharth Arora, Sayantani Ghosh, Aditi Sajwan, Navina Bole and Cheshta Mehta. A sequel series Betaal Aur Singhasan Battisi aired on SAB TV in 2015.

== Plot ==
The show is based on folktales of Singhaasan Battisi, this show story started on Raja Bhoja follows the adventures of in conquest of the famed throne of Raja Vikramaditya.

== Cast ==
- Karan Suchak as Maharaj Vikramaditya
- Siddharth Arora as Maharaj Bhoja
- Sayantani Ghosh as Devi Mahamaya
- Kajal Jain as Maharani Chitralekha (Vikramaditya's wife)
- Cheshta Mehta as Maharani Vallari (Bhoj's wife)
- Alihassan Turabi as Rahu
- Aditi Sajwan
- Navina Bole
- Nikunj Malik
- Sandeep Anand as Betaal
- Ankit Arora
- Priyanca Thakare
- Kunal Bakshi
- Poorti Arya as one of the rani in an episode
- Ujjwal Gauraha as Lobh Devta in an episode
