= Śivadāsa =

Ancient Indian writer

Śivadāsa was the author of one of the best-known versions of stories from the Vetālapañćavinśati or "Vetāla Tales"; a series of nīti-śāstras (tales of political ethics) involving the semi-legendary Indian king Vikramāditya.

== The author ==
Nothing is known about him for certain. The name is probably a pen name. Based on what may be inferred from his writing, he was a very well-educated courtier whose audience consisted of young men in the lower nobility with plenty of leisure time and a fondness for amusing stories involving warriors and courtesans. He may also have been an orator/actor who developed his stories through performance and only later wrote them down. He is believed to have lived somewhere between the twelfth to fourteenth centuries AD.

== The tales ==
Though often attributed to Bhavabhuti, the true origin of these tales is lost in antiquity. They appear to have been part of a large corpus of Kathā (narrative tales) about Vikramāditya that were first written down in Kashmir during the eleventh century. Several versions exist, the best-known being those by Śivadāsa and Jambhaladatta.

In Śivadāsa's version, King Vikramāditya's kingdom is endangered by the machinations of a powerful necromancer. While planning what to do, he encounters a Vetala (a form of genie that inhabits and animates corpses). He asks for the Vetala's help. He is then told twenty-five stories, each of which end with a riddle he must solve to prove his wisdom and knowledge. After solving all the riddles, the genie helps him to vanquish his enemy.

The story is told in the Champu literary style, (a mixture of prose and verse), which suggests the possibility of Jain influence.
