= Singhasan =

1986 Hindi film by Krishna

- Theatrical release poster
- Directed by: Krishna
- Written by: Krishna; Kader Khan (dialogues)
- Based on: Simhasanam (1986)
- Produced by: Krishna
- Starring: Jeetendra; Jaya Prada; Mandakini
- Cinematography: V. S. R. Swamy
- Edited by: Krishna
- Music by: Bappi Lahiri
- Production company: Padmalaya Studios
- Release date: 1986
- Running time: 162 minutes
- Country: India
- Language: Hindi

Singhasan (transl. Throne) is a 1986 Indian Hindi-language action film written, directed, edited, and produced by Krishna under his Padmalaya Studios banner. The film stars Jeetendra, Jaya Prada, Mandakini in lead roles, with music composed by Bappi Lahiri.

The film was shot simultaneously with its Telugu counterpart Simhasanam, which was also directed by Krishna and produced by Padmalaya Studios. Both films share some scenes and artists. Radha, who appeared in Simhasanam, reprised her role in Singhasan, marking her second and final Hindi film appearance. While Simhasanam was a significant commercial success, Singhasan was a commercial failure.

== Cast ==
- Jeetendra as Vikram Singh / Aditya Vardhan (dual role)
- Jaya Prada as Queen Alakananda
- Mandakini as Chandana
- Radha as Jaswanti
- Waheeda Rehman as Rajmata Katyayini Devi
- Pran as Achraya Abhangadev
- Kader Khan as Mahamantri Bhanu Pratap
- Shakti Kapoor as Ugrarahu
- Amjad Khan as Kukuteswar
- Bharat Bhushan as Maharaja Sharminder Bhupati
- Shreeram Lagoo as Mahamantri Shrikantji
- Sujit Kumar as Minister
- M. Balayya as Commander Veer Varma
- Kanta Rao as Sampurnacharya
- Thyagaraju
- Praveen Kumar as Kaal Bhairav
- Gurbachan Singh as Katari Kataiya
- Gulshan Grover as Kala Ketu
- Jayamalini as Dancer
- Anuradha as Dancer
- Jayasree T as Dancer
- Leena Das as Dancer

== Soundtrack ==
Lyrics: Indeevar

No.	Title	Singer(s)	Length
1.	"Takatu Taka Tai"	Kishore Kumar, P. Susheela
2.	"Tere Liye Maine Janam Liya, Mere Liye Tune Janam Liya"	Kishore Kumar, P. Susheela
3.	"Kismat Likhnewale Par Zara Bas Jo Chale Hamara"	Kishore Kumar, Asha Bhosle
4.	"Wah Wah, Kya Rang Hai, Wah Wah, Kya Roop Hai"	Kishore Kumar, Asha Bhosle
5.	"Booba Booba, Meri Booba"	Bappi Lahiri, Asha Bhosle
