= Kālakācārya Kathā =

Jain story of the monk Kālakacārya

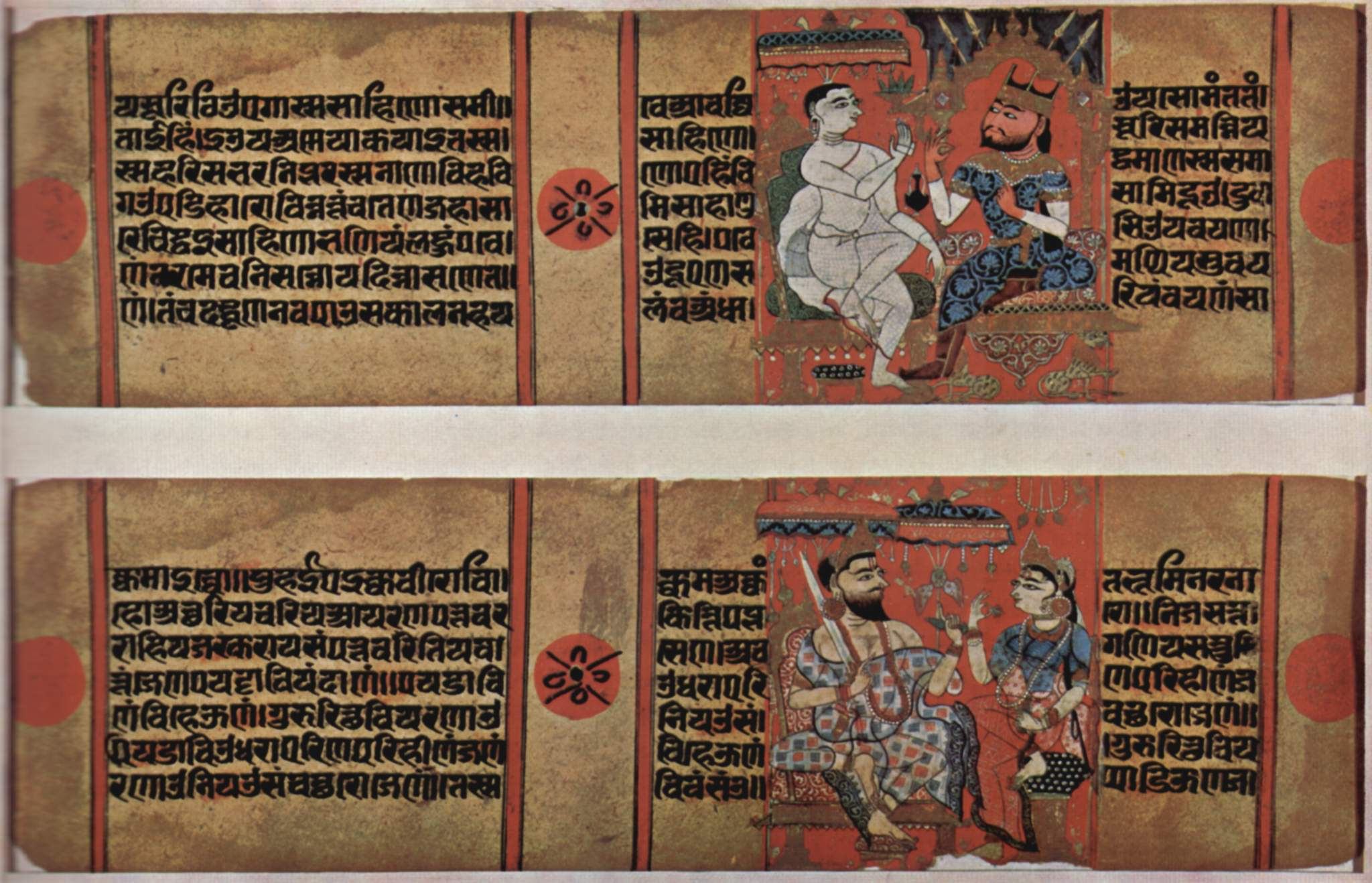
Top: Kalaka and the Saka king. Bottom: King Balamitra and his wife. Circa 1400.

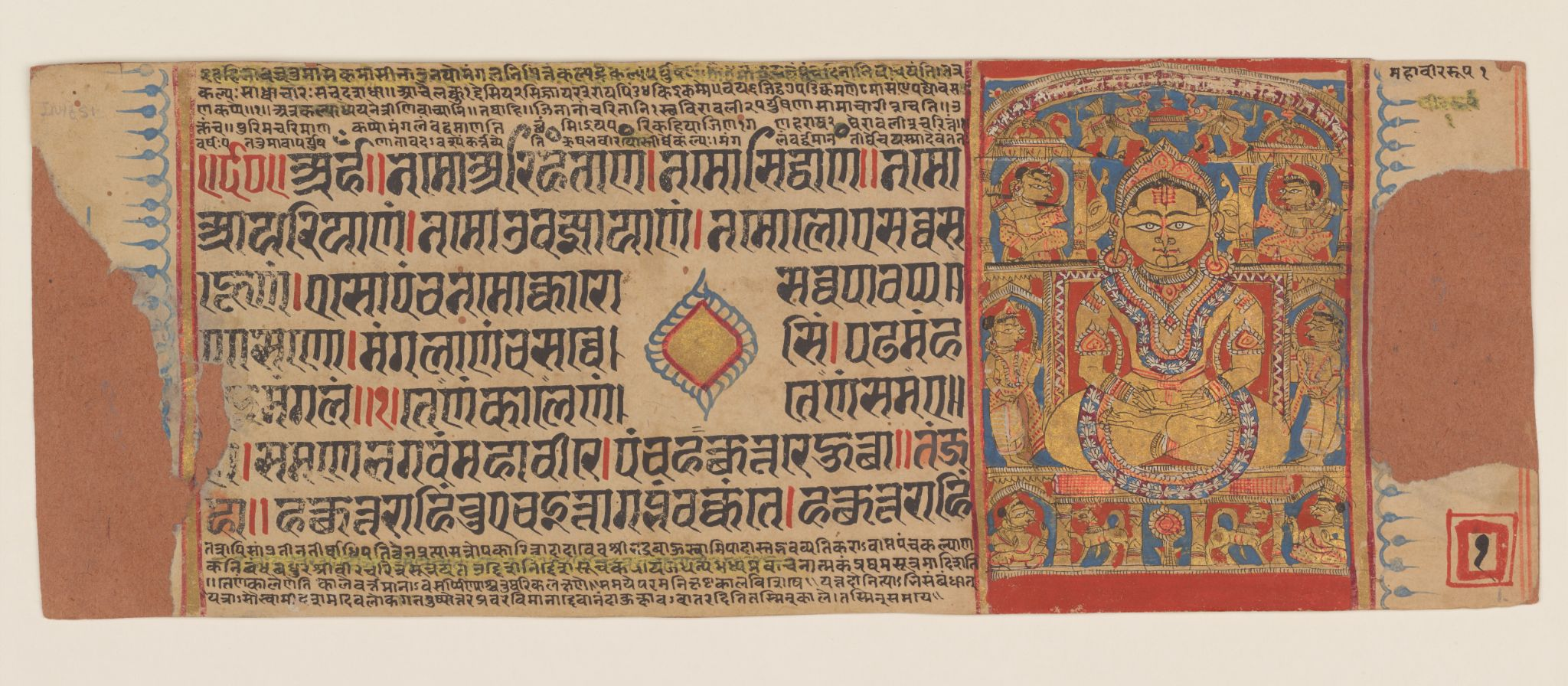
Manuscript of the Book of ritual (Kalpa-sūtra) and Story of the monk Kālaka (Kālakācārya-kathā). Gujarat, 1522

The Kālakācārya-kathā is a Jain story of the monk Kālakacārya (the acārya Kālaka). The story centers around Kālakā, a Jain monk and scholar who lived around the 1st century BCE. This legend appears mainly in the Śvetāmbara Jain tradition, as well as in several Jain texts, in various linguistic versions such as Prakrit, Sanskrit, and Old Gujarati.

In one of the main episodes, Kālakā's sister is abducted by Gardabhilla, the evil king who rules in Ujjayinī (modern-day Ujjain). Kālakā, being a powerless monk, seeks help to rescue her. He travels to the northwest (Scythian/Saka regions) and convinces the Saka king to assist him. The Saka king then manages to conquer Ujjayinī and rescue the sister. Later, the Saka king and Kālakācārya engage in various dialogues about ethics, dharma, and governance. Eventually, the story also portrays the conversion or moral transformation of the king and emphasizes non-violence, asceticism, and Jain values.

The narrative reflects Jain principles of righteousness, nonviolence, and the power of ascetic virtue over brute force and arbitrary rule. It also serves as a legendary description of the arrival of the Sakas (Indo-Scythians) in India and the beginning of the Saka era (starting in 78 CE).

The story was often illustrated in Jain manuscripts, especially in Western India during the medieval period.

== Sources ==
- Brown, W. Norman (William Norman) (1933). The story of Kālaka; texts, history, legends, and miniature paintings of the Śvetāmbara Jain hagiographical work, the Kālakācāryakathā. Washington [Baltimore, Md., The Lord Baltimore press].
