= Arthur W. Ryder =

American professor of Sanskrit (1877–1938)

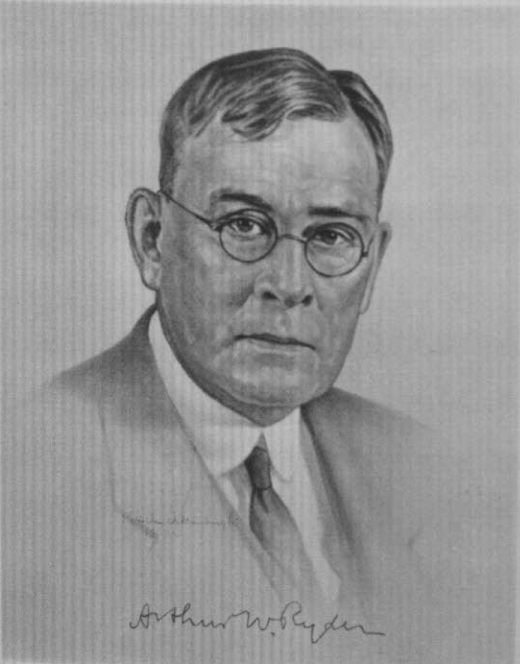
- Born: 8 March 1877; Oberlin
- Died: 21 March 1938
- Occupation: Philologist
- Writing career
- Language: English language

Arthur William Ryder (March 8, 1877 – March 21, 1938) was a professor of Sanskrit at the University of California, Berkeley. He is best known for translating a number of Sanskrit works into English, including the Panchatantra and the Bhagavad Gita.

In the words of G. R. Noyes,

Taken as a whole, Ryder's work as a translator is probably the finest ever accomplished by an American. It is also probably the finest body of translation from the Sanskrit ever accomplished by one man, if translation be regarded as a branch of literary art, not merely as a faithful rendering of the meaning of the original text.

== Life ==
Ryder was born on March 8, 1877, at Oberlin, Ohio, in the United States. He had his early education at Ann Arbor, Michigan, and the Phillips Academy in Andover, Massachusetts, from which he graduated in June 1894, to join Harvard University. He got his A.B. degree from Harvard in June 1897. After teaching Latin and literature at Andover for a year, he went to Germany for graduate studies. He studied at the University of Berlin and the University of Leipzig, from which he got the degree of Doctor of Philosophy in 1901, with a dissertation on the Rbhus in the Ṛgveda. He was an instructor in Sanskrit at Harvard University from 1902 until January 1906, when he moved to the University of California at Berkeley, to its linguistics department, as an instructor in Sanskrit and German. He became an instructor in Sanskrit alone later in the same year, became assistant professor in 1908, associate professor in 1919, and professor in 1925. From his arrival at Berkeley until his death, Sanskrit was a separate department with Ryder as chairman and sole member, after which it was absorbed into the Department of Classics. When in summer 1920 Berkeley first began offering courses in religion and religious education, Ryder was among the faculty, along with Herbert Francis Evans, Walter Goodnow Everett, Morris Jastrow Jr., and Walter B. Pitkin.

He was a member of the American Oriental Society and the American Philological Association. He was also a member of Phi Beta Kappa society, and wrote the society's annual poem for its meeting in 1912. It is also said that he was at one time ranked one of the two best chess players on the Pacific Coast.

== Work ==
In 1905, when still at Harvard, Ryder translated Śudraka's Mṛcchakatika into English as The Little Clay Cart, which was published as volume 9 of the Harvard Oriental Series. He translated Kālidāsa's Abhijñānaśākuntalam, Meghadūta, and other works, as well as the Bhagavad Gita and several volumes of verse translated from works by Bhartṛhari and others. His prose translations included the Panchatantra in 1925, excerpts from which were published as Gold's Gloom, Daṇḍin's Daśakumāracarita as The Ten Princes of Dandin, and Twenty-Two Goblins, a translation of Vetala Panchavimshati. He also wrote excellent original verse which he circulated privately, but did not publish.

Some verses from his translations were set to music. His Little Clay Cart was enacted at the Hearst Greek Theatre in Berkeley in 1907, a production that included a real live elephant on stage. Also enacted there in 1914 was Shakuntala, which was performed by the Mountain Play Association, who were invited to perform there after their performance in a natural amphitheatre on top of Mount Tamalpais, California. These two were the only Indian dramas performed there until 2004. His Little Clay Cart was also enacted in New York City in 1924 at the Neighborhood Playhouse, which was then an off-Broadway theatre, at the Theater de Lys in 1953, and at the Potboiler Art Theater in Los Angeles in 1926, when it featured actors such as James A. Marcus, Symona Boniface and Gale Gordon. Following his death in 1938, some of his original poems were published in a posthumous memorial volume with a biography, along with several of his translated verses. This was the only book of original poetry published by the University of California Press for several decades.

== Views on scholarship and education ==
He was known for his love of the language, preferring to publish whatever most delighted him, rather than scholarly articles. In fact, he was outspoken in his contempt for such articles, holding the view that Sanskrit ought to be studied not for philological reasons, but for the great literature it opened.

Scholarship is less than sense
Therefore seek intelligence.

— an epigram Ryder translated from the Panchatantra and quoted often.

He would say that "A professional literary critic is a man who hates literature." Perhaps for this reason, Time magazine described him as the "greatest Sanskrit student of his day", and an Italian Sanskritist said of him: "Ten men like that would make a civilization".

At a time when the university curriculum was undergoing upheavals, Ryder was a staunch defender of the traditional system of education in the classics. In his ideal world, the university curriculum would have been mostly limited to Latin, Greek, and mathematics, with subjects like history, philosophy, physics, and languages like Sanskrit, Hebrew, German, and French being allowed to serious students only later, as a sort of reward. The then-new disciplines like psychology and sociology were dismissed "out of hand as not worth damning."

== Style of translation ==
His translations were noted for their high fidelity to the originals despite his practice of translating into lively and natural conversational language using rhyme and modern English idiom:

Your nature is a thing you cannot beat;
It serves as guide in everything you do:
Give a dog all the meat that he can eat
You can't prevent his gnawing at a shoe.

— from the Hitopadesha.

In particular, his translation of the Shakuntala was regarded as the best at the time, his "accurate and charming" translation of the Panchatantra remains popular and highly regarded, while his translation of the Bhagavad Gita was not so successful.

== Legacy ==
Despite being described as "a loner with a caustic wit", as an educator he was encouraging and generous toward students, and consequently he found many devoted students. Harold F. Cherniss described him as "a friend half divine in his great humanity". When Anthony Boucher, who had been a student of his at Berkeley, wrote his novel The Case of the Seven of Calvary, he based the lead character of "Dr. Ashwin", professor of Sanskrit, after Ryder. (Ashvin is a Sanskrit word meaning a "rider".)

Another of his devoted students was J. Robert Oppenheimer. In 1933, Oppenheimer, then 29, was a young physics professor at Berkeley and studied Sanskrit under Ryder alongside enrolled students, doing assignments and recitation, and reading Kalidasa. Ryder introduced him to the Bhagavad Gita, which they read together in the original language. Later Oppenheimer cited it as one of the most influential books to shape his philosophy of life, famously recalling the Gita at the Trinity test. He described his teacher thus:

"Ryder felt and thought and talked as a Stoic ... a special subclass of the people who have a tragic sense of life, in that they attribute to human actions the completely decisive role in the difference between salvation and damnation. Ryder knew that a man could commit irretrievable error, and that in the face of this fact, all others were secondary." Tartly intolerant of humbug, laziness, stupidity and deceit, Ryder thought that "Any man who does a hard thing well is automatically respectable and worthy of respect."

Ryder died on March 21, 1938, of a heart attack, while teaching an advanced class with only one student. When he died, Gilbert N. Lewis said that the greatest mind in the university was gone.

== Bibliography ==
Articles

Although Ryder disdained "scholarship", he published a few scholarly papers early in his career.

- Arthur William Ryder (1901), Die Ṛbhu's im Ṛgveda., Druck von C. Bertelsmann, ISBN 9780524022320. Dissertation (in German).
- Ryder, Arthur W. (1902), "Note on bṛhácchandas, AV. iii. 12. 3", Journal of the American Oriental Society, 23, American Oriental Society: 77–78, doi:10.2307/592381, ISSN 0003-0279, JSTOR 592381.
- Ryder, Arthur W. (1902), "Krṣṇanātha's Commentary on the Bengal Recension of the Çakuntalā", Journal of the American Oriental Society, 23, American Oriental Society: 79–83, doi:10.2307/592382, ISSN 0003-0279, JSTOR 592382.
- Ryder, Arthur W. (1906), "Notes on the Mṛcchakaṭika", Journal of the American Oriental Society, 27, American Oriental Society: 418–454, doi:10.2307/592869, ISSN 0003-0279, JSTOR 592869.

Translations

Besides books, some were published in the University of California Chronicle.

- Śudraka; Arthur William Ryder (1905), The Little Clay Cart (Mrcchakatika): A Hindu Drama Attributed to King Shūdraka, Harvard Oriental Series, ISBN 9781465579935
- Ryder, A.W. (1908), "The Old Tiger and the Traveller", University of California Chronicle, vol. 10, pp. 450–453. A story translated from the Hitopadesha.
- Bhartṛhari; Arthur William Ryder (1910), Women's Eyes: Being verses translated from the Sanskrit, A.M. Robertson
- Arthur W. Ryder (1912), "More Verses From the Sanskrit", University of California Chronicle, vol. 14, pp. 296–314 Translations from Bilhaṇa's Chaura-panchashika, the Ramayana, Mahabharata, Raghuvamsha, etc.
- Kālidāsa; Arthur W. Ryder (1912), Kalidasa: Translations of Shakuntala, and Other Works, J. M. Dent & sons, ltd.
- Kālidāsa; Arthur William Ryder; Garnet Holme (1914), Shakuntala: an acting version in three acts
- Kālidāsa; Arthur W. Ryder (1915), "Malavika: A Five-act Comedy of Kalidasa", University of California Chronicle, vol. 17, pp. 123–167
- Bhartṛhari; Arthur William Ryder (1917) [1910], Women's Eyes: Being verses translated from the Sanskrit (third reprint ed.), A.M. Robertson
- Arthur W. Ryder (1917), "Fables from the Hitopadeça", University of California Chronicle, 19, vol. (Jan.), pp. 15–29
- Arthur W. Ryder (1917), "Lovers' Meeting", University of California Chronicle, 19, vol. (Oct.), pp. 364–76. Translated from Kathāsaritsāgara, Canto 104, which inspired the plot of Bhavabhuti's drama Mālati-mādhava.
- Arthur W. Ryder (1908–1917), Malavika: A Five-Act Comedy and Stories from the Hitopadeça and Kathasaritsagara, Berkeley: University of California Press
- Arthur W. Ryder (1917), Twenty-two Goblins: With 20 Illustrations, J.M. Dent
- Arthur William Ryder (1919), Relatives: Being Further Verses Translated from the Sanskrit, A.M. Robertson
- Arthur W. Ryder (1925), The Panchatantra, University of Chicago Press, ISBN 81-7224-080-5
- Arthur W. Ryder (1925), Gold's gloom: tales from the Panchatantra, University of Chicago Press
- Daṇḍin; Arthur William Ryder (1927), Dandin's Dasha-kumara-charita: The ten princes, University of Chicago Press
- Arthur William Ryder (1929), The Bhagavad-gita, The University of Chicago Press
- Arthur William Ryder; George Rapall Noyes (1939), Original poems: together with translations from the Sanskrit, University of California Press

Original poems

- Arthur W. Ryder (1912), "Tolstoi—A Critical Symposium", University of California Chronicle, vol. 14, pp. 430–436
- Arthur William Ryder; George Rapall Noyes (1939), Original poems: together with translations from the Sanskrit, University of California Press
