= Singhasan Battisi =

Indian collection of folk tales

- Original title: Simhasana Dvatrimsika
- Language: Sanskrit
- Genre: Fantasy
- Publication place: India

Singhasan Battisi is a collection of Indian folk tales. The title literally means "thirty-two (tales) of the throne". In the frame story, the 11th century king Bhoja discovers the throne of the legendary ancient king Vikramaditya. The throne has 32 statues, who are actually apsaras that had been turned into stone due to a curse. Each of the apsaras tells Bhoja a story about the life and adventures of Vikramaditya, in order to convince him that he is not deserving of Vikramaditya's throne.

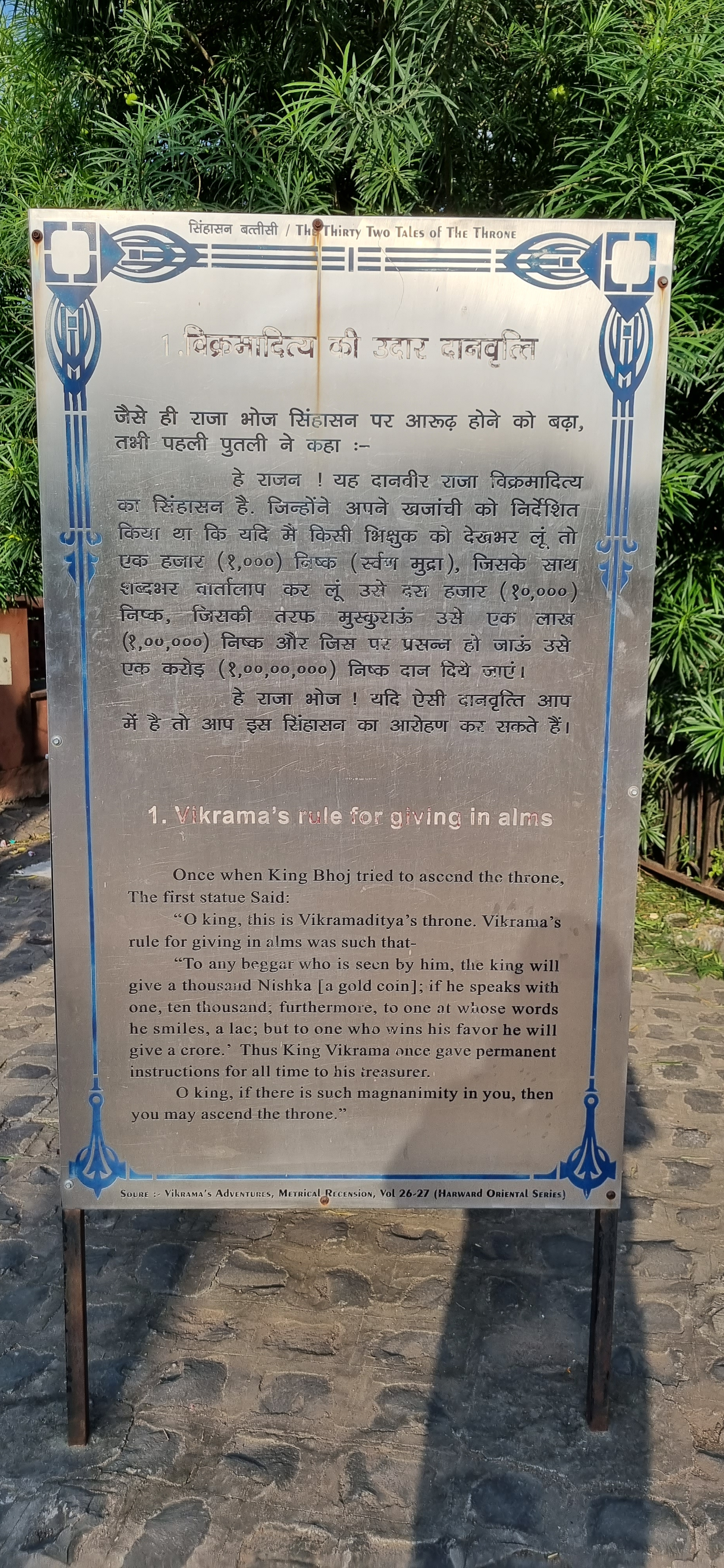
Singhasan Battisi folk tale

The original collection, written in Sanskrit, was known as Siṃhāsana Dvātriṃśikā. Other titles for the collection include Dvātriṃśat Puttalikā ("Thirty-two Statue Stories"), Vikrāmaditya Simhāsana Dvātriṃśika ("Thirty-two Tales of the Throne of Vikramaditya"), and Vikrama Charita ("Deeds or Adventures of Vikrama"). In modern vernaculars, the collection is known as Singhasan Battisi; other transliterations of the title include Sinhasan Battisi and Simhasan Battisi.

== Plot ==
King Bhoja walks past a field of a Brahmin with the royal entourage who from a seat on a high mound overlooking his whole field invites the King to have a taste of the fresh produce of his field. On the King's approach to the Brahmin's field, he leaves his seat to shoo off the birds, following which he miserly opposes King's entry on his field and charges him with grave intrusion and violation of civilian rights which prompts the King to leave the field immediately. After shooing off the birds, the Brahmin returns to sit on the mound. He then again beseeches King Bhoja to return to the field and taste the produce. Again the same process is repeated which intrigues Bhoja as to how the behavior of the Brahmin changes whilst on the mound and on the plain.

He learns that by just stepping on it, one's heart has all the magnanimous traits boosted and filled with love and justice. Bhoja's soldiers dig the mound to find a throne. The throne is identified as that of the ancient Emperor Vikramaditya, who was well-known and respected for being just. Bhoja's advisers tell him that he will also be able to pass the best judgements, once he sits on the throne.

The throne is supported by 32 statues of Apsaras. When Bhoja sits on the throne, one of the statues comes to life, and explains to the king that simply sitting on the throne will not make him a great judge: there are other qualities that he lacks. The Apsara tells him one story related to one quality that a good judge must possess and flies away. In the same manner, one after another, the Apsaras tell a story related to a quality and fly away. Bhoja realizes that he does not possess the qualities that would make one eligible to sit on the throne. Some of these qualities are selflessness, complete honesty, lack of bias or favouritism and a true urge to give justice.

== Authorship and date ==
The author and date of the original work is unknown. Since the story mentions Bhoja (died 1055 CE), it must have been composed in or after the 11th century.

Five primary recensions of the Sanskrit version Simhasana-dvatrimsika are dated to 13th and 14th centuries.

Khulasat-ut-Tawarikh (1695 CE) by Sujan Rai claims that the work had been authored by Pandit Braj, the wazir (prime minister) of Bhoja.

== Translations ==
`Abd al-Qadir Bada'uni translated the stories into Persian for the Mughal emperor Akbar, as Nama - Khirad Afza ("Wisdom-enhancing book"). The translation was completed in 1581 CE. Other titles for the Persian translation include Gul Afshan and Senguehassen Battisi.

Lallu Lal and Kazim Ali Javan translated it into Hindi. During 1814–15, William Carey published the Marathi translation under the title Simhasana Battisi, along with Panchatantra and Hitopadesha. The 17th century poet Shamal Bhatt had adapted these stories as narrative poetry.

Franklin Edgerton translated it as "The Adventures of Vikrama" in four of its popular rescensions. It is sometimes published along with the Baital Pachisi.

Koravi Goparaju translated it into Telugu language in 15th century as Simhasana Dwitrimsika. It was published by Andhra Sahitya Parishad, Kakinana in 1936 under the editorship of Vemparala Suryanarayana Sastry. Subsequently, Andhra Pradesh Sahitya Akademi, Hyderabad published in one volume in 1982. The editor Gadiyaram Ramakrishna Sarma has written a detailed Foreword.

== TV adaptations ==
A television adaptation of Singhasan Battisi was aired on Doordarshan in 1985. In 2014, another adaptation was aired on Sony Pal. An Indian animated television series, Singhasan Battisi, produced by Shethia Audio and Video aired on Pogo from 2011 to 2012.
