= Lallu Lal =

Indian academic, author and translator (1763–1835)

- Born: 1763; Agra, Maratha Empire
- Died: 1835 (aged 71–72); Calcutta, Bengal Presidency, British India
- Occupations: College instructor, translator, author
- Notable work: Prem Sagar

Lallu Lal (1763–1835) was an academic, author and translator from India. He was an instructor in the Hindustani language at Fort William College in Hastings, Calcutta. He is notable for Prem Sagar, the first work in modern literary Hindi.

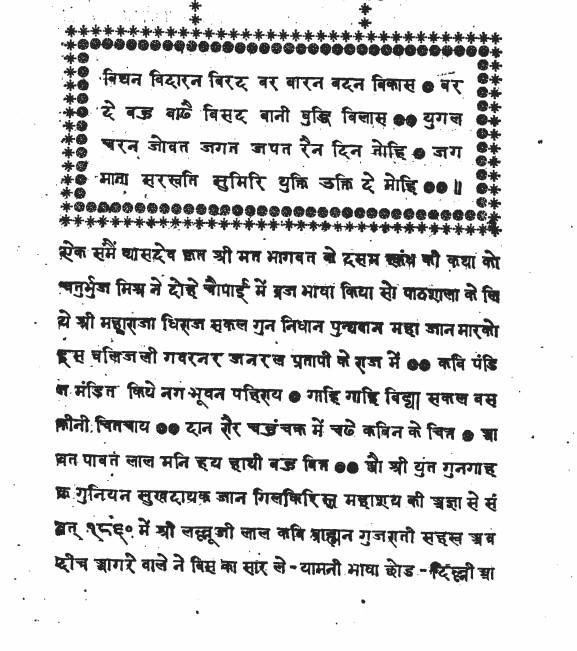
Prem Sagar of Lallo Lal, page 1, Sunscrit Press Calcutta, 1810.

== Biography ==
Lallu Lal was born into a Gujarati Sahsra Audichya Brahmin family from Agra. He had knowledge of Persian and Hindustani. He came to Murshidabad, Bengal, to earn a living, and served the Nawab of Murshidabad for seven years. He was noticed by John Gilchrist, who brought him to the Fort William College in Calcutta. There, Lallu Lal translated and authored several literary works into modern vernacular Hindi. He retired from the Fort William College in 1823–24, after serving there for 24 years.

== Works ==
Lallu Lal's most notable translation is Prem Sagar (1804–1810), the earliest prose in Khari Boli dialect of Hindi. He translated Singhasan Battisi and Shakuntala into Hindustani with Kazim Ali Javan. He also translated Baital Pachisi and Madhunal (1805) into Hindustani with Mazhar Ali Vila.

Lallu Lal's original work included The Grammar of Brij-bhasa (1811), in Urdu script. He also authored Lala Chandrika, a commentary on Bihari's Satasai.

In addition, he compiled Lataif-i-Hindi or The New Cyclopedia Hindoostanica of Wit (1810) in Urdu and Devanagari scripts. It is a collection of around 100 witty stories and anecdotes.

=== Prem Sagar ===
Prem Sagar or Prem Sagur ("Ocean of Love") was one of the first modern Hindi books that was typeset and published. It composed between 1804 and 1810, first published in part in 1805, and a completed edition was published in 1810. The book has become part of the canon of religious literature in Hindi. It has gone through fifteen editions. In the nineteenth century, William Hollings was the first to translate the text into English. Edward Backhouse Eastwick translated it into English in 1851 and Pincott in 1897. Pincott challenged Lal's language, claiming the work needed correction by Englishmen like himself. According to scholar Sucheta Kanjilal, this view reflected the colonial impulse to standardize Hindi. She argues that this colonial authority continues to dominate through the website Sacred-Texts.com which hosts Hollings' translation of Prem Sagar. The Sacred Texts edition of Prem Sagar unintentionally gives global access to understand, misunderstand, and essentialize Hinduism.

A prose translation of Chaturbhuja Misra's now lost Braj Bhasha poem, its story is based on the tenth book of the Bhagavata Purana, the legend of Krishna. Lallu Lal mentioned that book has been composed in the "Khadi Boli of Delhi-Agra". The language is termed as "translated into Hinduvee from the Brij Bhasha" on the face page.

Scholars such as linguist Jules Bloch and Sucheta Kanjilal have described Prem Sagar's role in creating a new dialect which was foundational for modern Hindi. Bloch writes that the "new dialect gave a lingua franca to the Hindus." The earliest Hindustani language literature made heavy use of Persian words, and resembled modern Urdu. Lallu Lal was among the first writers to use words of Indo-Aryan origin in Hindustani language literature. His Prem Sagar is the earliest work whose language resembles modern Sanskritized Hindi.

The book was inspired stylistically by the Caurāsī Vaiṣṇavan kī Vārtā, a 17th-18th century Braj Bhasha text written by Harirāy.

The book was intended for 20-24 year old English colonial officers as a guide to ruling the native people by understanding their religion. Lal clearly expresses that his work was possible through colonial support and that it will be used for instruction at Fort William College.

== Bibliography ==
- The Prema-Sâgara or, Ocean of Love. Ed. by Frederick Pincoff. Westminster, Archibald Constable, 1891
- Théologie hindoue. Le Prem Sagar, océan d’amour. Traduit par Е. Lamairesse II., 1893, Saint-Amand, 1899
- The Prem Sagar in English. Allahabad, 1900
