= Vetala Panchavimshati =

Collection of Indian tales

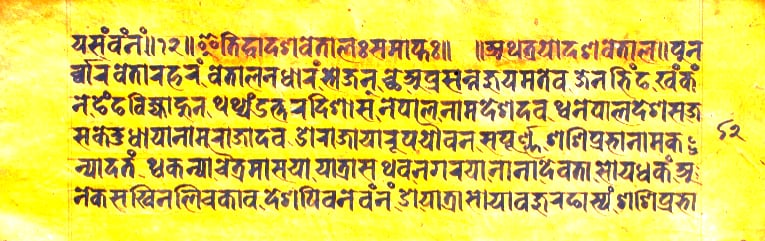
A 17th-century manuscript of Vetala Panchavimshati written in Newar script, from Nepal.

The Vetala Panchavimshati (Sanskrit: वेतालपञ्चविंशति, IAST: vetālapañcaviṃśati), or Betal Pachisi ("Twenty-five (tales) of Betal"), is a collection of tales and legends within a frame story, from India. Internationally, it is also known as Vikram-Vetala. It was originally written in Sanskrit.

One of its oldest recensions is found in the 12th book of the Kathasaritsagara ("Ocean of the Streams of Story"), a work in Sanskrit compiled in the 11th century by Somadeva, but based on yet older materials, now lost. This recension comprises in fact twenty-four tales, the frame narrative itself being the twenty-fifth. The two other major recensions in Sanskrit are those by Śivadāsa and Jambhaladatta.

The Vetala stories are popular in India and have been translated into many Indian vernaculars. Several English translations exist, based on Sanskrit recensions and on Hindi, Tamil, Bengali, and Marathi versions. Probably the best-known English version is that of Sir Richard Francis Burton which is, however, not a translation but a very free adaptation.

== Plot ==
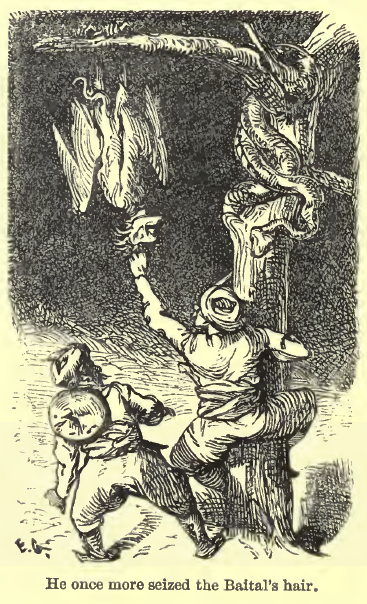
Ernest Griset's depiction of Vikram and the Betaal in Richard Francis Burton's 1870 retelling of the story.

The legendary king Vikramāditya (Vikrama) promises a digambara (a naked Jain ascetic) or vamachari (a tantric sorcerer) that he will capture a vetala, who hangs upside-down from a tree and inhabits and animates dead bodies.

King Vikrama faces many difficulties in bringing the vetala to the tantric. Each time Vikram tries to capture the vetala, it tells a story that ends with a riddle. If Vikrama cannot answer the question correctly, the vampire consents to remain in captivity. If the king knows the answer but still keeps quiet, then his head shall burst into thousand pieces. And if King Vikrama answers the question correctly, the vampire would escape and return to his tree. He knows the answer to every question; therefore the cycle of catching and releasing the vampire continues twenty-four times.

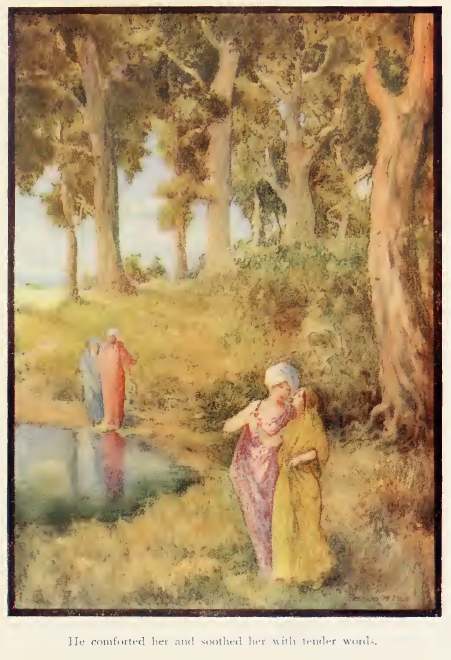
Father and son meet mother and daughter, in the Baital's final tale. Illustration by Perham Wilhelm Nahl from Arthur W. Ryder's Twenty-two Goblins.

On the twenty-fifth attempt, the Vetala tells the story of a father and a son in the aftermath of a devastating war. They find the queen and the princess alive in the chaos, and decide to take them home. In due time, the son marries the queen and the father marries the princess. Eventually, the son and the queen have a son, and the father and the princess have a daughter. The vetala asks what the relation between the two newborn children is. The question stumps Vikrama. Satisfied, the vetala allows himself to be taken to the tantric.

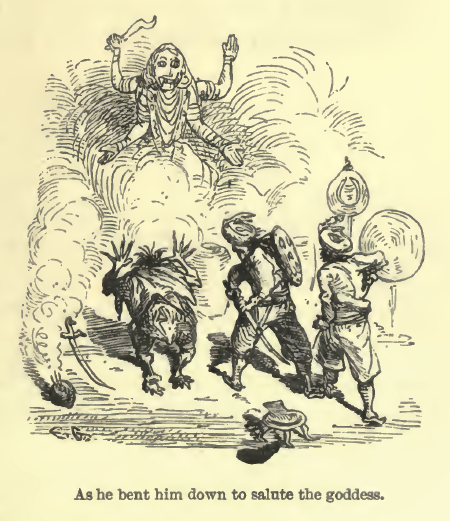
Vikram prepares to behead the tantric. Illustration by Ernest Griset from Burton's Vikram and the Vampire.

On their way to the tantric, Vetala tells his story. His parents did not have a son and a tantric blessed them with twin sons on a condition that both be educated under him. Vetala was taught everything in the world but often ill-treated. Whereas his brother was taught just what was needed but always well treated. Vetala discovered that the tantric planned to return his brother to his parents and Vetala instead would be sacrificed as he was an 'all-knowing kumara' and by sacrificing him the tantric could be immortal and rule the world using his tantric powers. Vetal also reveals that now the tantric's plan is to sacrifice Vikram, beheading him as he bowed in front of the goddess. The tantric could then gain control over the vetala and sacrifice his soul, thus achieving his evil ambition. The vetala suggests that the king asks the tantric how to perform his obeisance, then take advantage of that moment to behead the sorcerer himself. Vikramāditya does exactly as told by the vetala and he is blessed by Indra and Kali. The vetala offers the king a boon, whereupon Vikram requests that the tantric's heart and mind be cleaned of all sins and his life be restored as a good living being and that the vetala would come to the king's aid when needed.

=== Variation ===
A variation of this story replaces the vetal with a minor celestial who, in exchange for his own life, reveals the plot by two tradesmen (replacing the sorcerer) to assassinate Vikrama and advises Vikrama to trick them into positions of vulnerability as described above. Having killed them, Vikrama is offered a reward by the goddess, who grants him two spirits loyal to her as his servants.

== Other media ==
=== Films ===
It was adapted into 1951 Hindi film Jai Maha Kali (Vikram Vaital) by Dhirubhai Desai starring Lalita Pawar, Nirupa Roy, Shahu Modak, Raj Kumar, and S. N. Tripathi. It was remade in 1986 as Vikram Vetal, by Shantilal Soni, starring Vikram Gokhale, Manhar Desai, and Deepika Chikhalia.

The 2017 Tamil film Vikram Vedha was a modern-day adaptation of the story with the characterization of King Vikramaditya and the celestial spirit Vetala derived from that plot. The title of the film was also derived from the two key characters from the folktale. In 2022, the film was remade in Hindi under the same title.

=== Television ===
In 1985, the story was developed by Sagar Films as a television serial titled Vikram aur Betaal, starring Arun Govil as Vikrama and Sajjan Kumar as the Vetala. It was aired on Doordarshan, the public television broadcaster of India. A remake of that serial by the new generation of Sagar Films, titled Kahaniyaan Vikram aur Betaal Ki, was aired on the Indian satellite channel Colors.

Indian animator Rajiv Chilaka directed Vikram Betal, a television film for Cartoon Network in 2004 which was produced by his Green Gold Animations. Another 2006 supernatural sitcom Vicky & Vetaal was inspired by the Baital Pachisi. A web series titled The Vetala was released in 2009, written and directed by Damon Vignale. The series reveals a CGI vetala character in the final episode.

2018 Hindi TV adaptation Vikram Betaal Ki Rahasya Gatha was aired on &TV, where actors Aham Sharma and Makrand Deshpande as playing the role of King Vikramaditya and Betaal respectively.

=== Literature ===
The children's Chandamama, featured a serial story titled New Tales of Vikram and Betal for many years. As the title suggests, the original premise of the story is maintained, as new stories are told by Vetala to King Vikrama.

In the novel, Alif the Unseen, a character named Vikrama the Vampire appears as a jinn. He tells how thousands of years ago, King Vikrama had set off to defeat the Vetala, a vampire jinn terrorizing one of his villages. Vikrama won the Vetala's game of wits, but forfeited his life. The Vetala now inhabits his body.

== Recensions, editions, and translations ==
=== Sanskrit ===
Both the Kṣemendra and Somadeva recensions derive from the unattested "Northwestern" Bṛhatkathā, and include the Vetala Tales as a small part of their huge inventory. The recensions of Śivadāsa and Jambhaladatta contain only the Vetala Tales and have an unknown relationship to each other and to the other Sanskrit recensions.

Kṣemendra's Bṛhatkathāmanjarī (1037 CE)

- Anonymous Sanskrit summary of Kṣemendra

Somadeva's Kathāsaritsāgara (1070 CE)

- Somadeva (1862), Brockhaus, Hermann (ed.), Kathā Sarit Sāgara, Leipzig: F. A. Brockhaus — Books VI, VII & VIII; and Books IX–XVIII (1866)
  - Tawney, C. H. (1884), The Katha Sarit Sagara; or Ocean of the Streams of Story, vol. 2, Calcutta: J. W. Thomas, at the Baptist Mission Press, pp. 232–360
  - Penzer, N. M. (1926), The Ocean of Story, being C.H. Tawney's Translation of Somadeva's Katha Sarit Sagara, vol. VI, London: Chas. J. Sawyer — Tawney's translation of Brockhaus text, but with corrections and additions based on Durgāprasād (below)
  - Penzer, N. M. (1927), The Ocean of Story, being C.H. Tawney's Translation of Somadeva's Katha Sarit Sagara, vol. VII, London: Chas. J. Sawyer — Tawney's translation of Brockhaus text, but with corrections and additions based on Durgāprasād (below)
- Pandit Durgāprasāda; Kāśīnātha Pāṇḍuraṅga Paraba, eds. (1889), The Kathâsaritsâgara of Somadevabhatta, The Nirnaya-Sâgara Press
  - Ryder, Arthur W. (1917), Twenty-two Goblins, London: J. M. Dent & Sons
  - Van Buitenen, J. A. B. (1959), "The King and the Corpse", Tales of Ancient India, University of Chicago Press, pp. 11–64 — English translation of about half of Somadeva's Vetala Tales.

Jambhaladatta (11th–14th century CE)

- Emeneau, M. B., ed. (1934), Jambhaladatta's version of the Vetālapañcavinśati, American Oriental Series, vol. 4, New Haven, CT: American Oriental Society, hdl:2027/uc1.32106001612602

Śivadāsa (11th–14th century CE)

- Uhle, Heinrich, ed. (1914), Die Vetālapañcaviṃśatikā des Sivadāsa, Berichte über die Verhandlungen der Königlich-Sächsischen Gesellschaft der Wissenschaften zu Leipzig : Philosophisch-historische Klasse, vol. 66, Leipzig: Teubner
  - Ritschl, E.; Schetelich, M., eds. (1989), Die fünfundzwanzig Erzählungen des Totendämons, Leipzig — Translation of Śivadāsa recension.
  - Rajan, Chandra (1995), Śivadāsa: The Five-and-Twenty Tales of the Genie, Penguin Books — Translated from Uhle's Sanskrit edition.

=== Hindi ===
Some time between 1719 and 1749, Ṣūrat Kabīshwar translated Śivadāsa's Sanskrit recension into Braj Bhasha; this work was subsequently translated in 1805 under the direction of John Gilchrist into the closely related Hindustani language by Lallu Lal and others. This was a popular work that played an early role in the development of Literary Hindi and was selected as a Hindustani test-book for military service students in the East India Company. Thus it became the basis of several Hindi editions, and Indian vernacular and English translations; many of these frequently reprinted.

- Lāl, Lallū (1805), Buetal Pucheesee; being a collection of twenty-five stories ... translated into Hindoostanee from the Brij Bhakka of Soorut Kubeeshwur, Calcutta
  - Hollings, Captain W. (1848), The Bytal Pucheesee: translated into English, Calcutta: W. Ridsdale, hdl:2027/hvd.hxcp5h — Reprinted several times between 1848 and 1921 (some later editions as Baital Pachisi). 1884 edition at the Internet Archive
  - Barker, W. Burckhardt (1855), Eastwick, E. B. (ed.), The Baitál Pachísí; or, Twenty-five Tales of a Demon, Hertford: Stephen Austin — A new edition of the Hindí text, with each word expressed in the Hindústaní character immediately under the corresponding word in the Nágarí; and with a perfectly literal English interlinear translation, accompanied by a free translation in English at the foot of each page, and explanatory notes.
  - Forbes, Duncan (1861), The Baitāl Pachīsī; or The Twenty-five Tales of a Demon, London: Wm. H. Allen & Co. — A new and corrected Edition, with a vocabulary of all the words occurring in the text.
    - Munshi, Ghulam Mohammad (1868), The Baitál-Pachísí; or The Twenty-five Stories of a Demon, Bombay: The Oriental Press — Translated from Dr. Forbes's new and correct edition.
    - Platts, John (1871), The Baitāl Pachīsī; or The Twenty-five Tales of a Sprite, London: Wm. H. Allen & Co. — Translated from the Hindi text of Dr. Duncan Forbes.
  - Burton, Richard F. (1893) [1870], Vikram & the Vampire; or Tales of Hindu Devilry (Memorial ed.), London: Longmans, Green, and Co. — Not a translation, but a retelling "more Burtonian than Indian", based on one or more of the Hindustani editions or translations.
- Kṛishṇa, Kālī (1834), Bytal Puchisi; or the Twenty-five Tales of Bytal, Calcutta — Translated from the Brujbhakha into English.

== See also ==
- The Adventures of Massang, story from a Kalmyk/Mongolian version of the compilation
- The Girl Langa Langchung and the Rooster, story from a Tibetan version of the compilation
- The White Bird and His Wife, story from a Kalmyk/Mongolian version of the compilation
