= Vetala =

Animated corpse from Hindu mythology

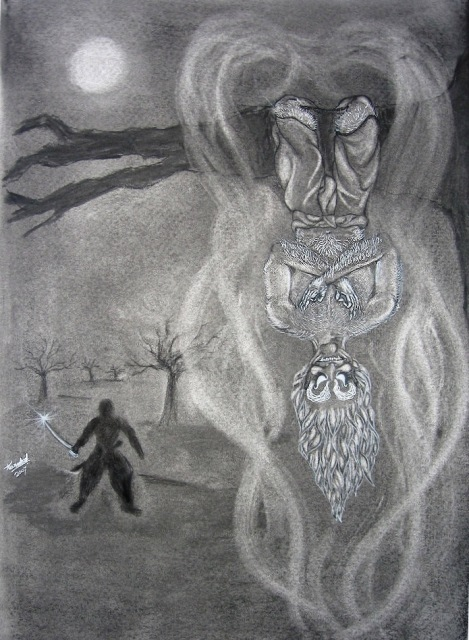
King Vikramaditya and a vetala in the Vetala Panchavimshati.

A vetala (Sanskrit: वेताल, romanized: vetāla) is a class of beings in Hindu mythology. They are usually defined as a knowledgeable (fortune telling) paranormal entity said to be dwelling at charnel grounds. Reanimated corpses are used as vehicles by these spirits for movement. A vetala may possess and leave a dead body at will.

== Description ==
In Hindu folklore, the vetala is an evil spirit who haunts cemeteries and takes demonic possession of corpses. They make their displeasure known by troubling humans. They can drive people mad, kill children, and cause miscarriages, but also guard villages.

They are hostile spirits of the dead trapped in the 'twilight zone' between life and afterlife. These creatures can be repelled by the chanting of mantras. One can free them from their ghostly existence by performing their funerary rites. Being unaffected by the laws of space and time, they have an uncanny knowledge about the past, present, and future and a deep insight into human nature. Therefore, many sorcerers seek to capture them and turn them into slaves.

There is also a strong Vetala cult in the Konkan region, under the names of Betal, Vetal, Vetoba. Since Betal is said to be the husband of the goddess Shantadurga, there will be a temple dedicated in honour of Betal either within the temple complex of Shantadurga or somewhere in the sylvan surroundings. There is a Betal temple in Amona, Goa. Betal is a form of Bhairava and is the head of all spirits, ghouls, vampires and all kinds of pisachas.

== Literature ==
The Vetala Panchavimshati is a collection of twenty-five stories, featuring a vetala as one of the two central characters. It is a part of the Kathasaritsagara, a work that was compiled no later than the 11th century. It features a frame story of a sorcerer who asks King Vikramaditya to capture a corpse hanging on a tree that stands in the middle of a cremation ground. The corpse is possessed by a vetala, who proposes to tell the king a story along the journey. After the vetala finishes the story, he would ask the king a question, which he would have to answer. After Vikramaditya answers the question, the vetala would return to the tree, the corpse hanging upon it once more. This event occurs twenty-four times, after which the king is unable to answer the question posed by the vetala. Impressed with the king, the vetala informs him of the evil designs of the sorcerer, and grants him a gift that would allow him to acquire the powers of witchcraft and defeat the sorcerer.

== In popular culture ==
Vikram Vetal, a 1986 Indian fantasy film directed by Shantilal Soni was based on the Baital Pachisi about King Vikramaditya and the Vetala.

Vikram Aur Betaal was a television programme based on the Baital Pachisi produced by Ramanand Sagar and directed by his son Prem Sagar that aired on DD National channel. It was remade as Kahaniya Vikram aur Betaal Ki in 2009 and aired on Colors TV. Vikram Betaal Ki Rahasya Gatha (2018), an Indian mythological serial based on Baital Pachisi aired on &TV. Indian animator Rajiv Chilaka directed Vikram Betal, a television film for Cartoon Network in 2004 which was produced by his Green Gold Animations. Vicky & Vetaal (2006–2007) and Vicky Aur Vetaal (2015–2016), which aired on Disney Channel India, also featured Vetala as the main character.

== Sources ==
- Dictionary of Hindu Lore and Legend (ISBN 0-500-51088-1) by Anna Dallapiccola
