= Shantilal Soni =

Indian film director (1930–2004)

Shantilal Soni, also known as S. L. Soni (28 November 1930 – 2004), was a noted film director, producer and writer from Bombay. He was a Gujarati by birth. He has directed more than 22 films, starting his career in 1960 with Sinhal Dweep Ki Sundari and ending in 2002 with Mahima Kali Maa Ki. He produced three films and wrote two films. He has directed films for Bollywood, Gujarati cinema and Bengali cinema.

== Filmography ==
- Sinhal Dweep Ki Sundari (1960)
- Mr. X in Bombay (1964)
- Shreeman Funtoosh (1965)
- Aur Pappu Pass Ho Gaya (2007)
