= Pinky Parikh =

Indian actress

Pinky Parikh is an Indian actress from Gujarat, India. She is well known for her act in Ramanand Sagar's Shri Krishna (1994) as Rukmini, which starred Sarvadaman D. Banerjee as Krishna. She also acted in various Indian TV serials and films. She has won various awards including best actress of the year from the state government of Gujarat for her work in the movie Mann, Moti 'Ne Kaach.

In 2021 she took a lead part in a new TV series, "Moti Baa Ni Nani Vahu" set in Gujarat.

== Awards ==
- Gujarat State Film Awards for Best Actress for Mann, Moti 'Ne Kaach (1999–2000)

== Filmography ==
=== Actress ===
Year	Title	Role	Note	Ref(s)
1993—1999	Shri Krishna	Rukmini, Lakshmi	TV series	
1993—2002	Alif Laila	Duraksha, Fairy Zeba Zeemi Shaheen, Marjina, Badroulbadour, Taaguti		
1998	Desh Re Joya Dada Pardesh Joya	Rita		
	Mann, Moti 'Ne Kaach		Gujarati Movie	
	Hu Tu Ne Ramtudi		Gujarati Movie	
	Taro Malak Mare Jovo Chhe		Gujarati Movie	
	Sangaath		Gujarati Play	
2005	Had Karo Chho Hasubhai		Gujarati Play	
	Alakh Ne Otale Jesal Ne Torala			
	Raj Rajvan			
	Jai Mahalakshmi	Vaishnodevi	TV series	
2021-present	Moti Baa ni nani vahu	Kundan Zaveri(Moti Baa)	Gujarati serial	Lead Role
