= Prem Sagar (cinematographer) =

Indian cinematographer, director

- Died: 31 August 2025 (aged 81); Mumbai, Maharashtra, India
- Education: FTII
- Occupations: cinematographer, director
- Parents: Ramanand Sagar (father); Leelavati (mother)

Prem Sagar was a veteran cinematographer, director, producer, and screenwriter, primarily active in Hindi cinema and television.

== Career ==
Sagar was an alumnus of the Film and Television Institute of India (FTII), Pune, from the 1968 batch. At FTII, he received the gold medal for the best academic student and the silver medal for the best-photographed student film.

Sagar served as a cinematographer on notable movies like Charas (1976), Lalkar (1972), Jalte Badan (1973), and Hamrahi (1974).

He played a key role in developing and marketing several highly popular Indian television serials. Besides that, he contributed to their visual identity as a still photographer and cinematographer. These serials include Vikram Aur Betaal, Ramayan, Luv Kush, Shri Krishna, Alif Laila, and Prithviraj Chauhan.

Vikram Aur Betaal is considered the first fantasy serial on Indian television. Ramayan, originally aired on Doordarshan, India’s national public service broadcaster, is one of the most-watched television serials in the world.

== Awards ==
Sagar received fifteen awards for cinematography.

== Personal ==
Sagar was the son of filmmaker Ramanand Sagar, who created the well-known television series Ramayan under the banner of Sagar Arts. He died at his residence in Mumbai on August 31, 2025, at the age of 81. He was survived by his son and television producer, Shiv Sagar.

== Filmography ==
As cinematographer/technical advisor

- Lalkar (1972)
- Jalte Badan (1973)
- Hamrahi (1974)
- Charas (1976)
- Prem Bandhan (1979)
- Pyara Dushman (1980)
- Armaan (1981)
- Bhagawat (1982)
- Badal (1985)
- Salma (1985)

As director

- Hum Tere Ashiq Hain (1979)

As actor

- Namak Halal (1982)
- Sagar Sangam (1988)
- Jawani Zindabad (1990)
- Nishchaiy (1992)
- Ek Ladka Ek Ladki (1992)

As producer and director of the television series

- Vikram aur Betaal (1985)
- Alif Laila (1993 to 1997)
- Luv Kush (1988 to 1989)
- Sai Baba (2005 to 2009)
- Prithviraj Chauhan (2006 to 2009)
- Prithviraj Chauhan (2006-2009)
- Durga (2008)
- Chandragupta Maurya (2011 to 2012)

As co-producer of the television series (along with Ramanand Sagar and Subhash Sagar)

- Ramayan (1987)
- Shri Krishna (1993-1999)

As writer and producer of the television series

- Kaamdhenu Gaumata (2025)

== Publications ==
An Epic Life - Ramanand Sagar: From Barsaat to Ramayan by Prem Sagar, Penguin, 2019.
