= Irshad Mirza =

Indian industrialist (died 2022)

- Born: Kanpur, Uttar Pradesh, India
- Died: 4 December 2022; Kanpur, Uttar Pradesh, India
- Education: Aligarh Muslim University
- Occupations: Industrialist, Entrepreneur
- Known for: Co-founder of Mirza International
- Awards: Padma Shri
- Website: mirza.co.in

Irshad Mirza (died 4 December 2022) was an Indian industrialist and the executive chairman of Mirza International group of companies. He was awarded the fourth-highest Indian civilian award of Padma Shri by the Government of India in 2010, for his outstanding contribution in the field of trade and industry.

== Biography ==
In 1979, Mirza founded 'Mirza Tanners Private Limited' for manufacturing finished leather at Magarwara near Kanpur. He was a former chairman of the Uttar Pradesh State Minority Commission. He was an alumnus of the Aligarh Muslim University and a former member of the University Court.

== Death ==
Mirza died from an illness at the age of 95 on 4 December 2022 at a Regency Hospital, Kanpur.

== Awards and recognition ==
In year 2010, government of India awarded Mirza the Padma Shri award for his work in the field of Trade and Industry. His name has also appeared in Forbes magazine's list of influential industrialists.
