= Ilzaam (1954 film) =

1954 film by R.C. Talwar

- Directed by: R. C. Talwar
- Written by: R. C. Talwar
- Produced by: Rafiq Anwar; R. C. Talwar
- Starring: Meena Kumari; Kishore Kumar
- Edited by: Prakash Malhotra
- Music by: Madan Mohan
- Release date: 1954
- Running time: 153 minutes
- Country: India
- Language: Hindi

Ilzam (transl. Accusation) is a 1954 Indian Hindi-language film directed by R. C. Talwar and starring Meena Kumari and Kishore Kumar in lead roles. Madan Mohan gave the music of the film.

== Plot ==
The urban settled boy Rajan falls in love with a village happy-go-lucky girl Kamli but his mother is against their relationship. Situations occur when their relationship faces a blue. What happens next? Will they come together?

== Cast ==
- Meena Kumari as Kamli
- Kishore Kumar as Rajan
- Shammi as Rekha
- Randhir as Lakhoo
- Om Prakash
- Meera Devi as Rajan's mother
- Jagdish Kanwar
- Jagdish Sethi
- Tiwari

== Crew ==
- Director – R. C. Talwar
- Producer – Rafiq Anwar, R. C. Talwar
- Dialogues – Ramanand Sagar
- Screenplay – R. C. Talwar
- Cinematography – Madan Sinha
- Music – Madan Mohan
- Lyrics – Rajendra Krishan
- Editing – Prakash Malhotra
- Playback Singers – Manna Dey, Asha Bhosle, Kishore Kumar, Shamshad Begum and Sunder

== Soundtrack ==
The film had eight songs in it. The music of the film was composed by Madan Mohan. Rajendra Krishan wrote the lyrics.

Song	Singer
"Yeh Jag Rain Basera"	Manna Dey
"Tu Hai Meri Chandaniya"	Shamshad Begum
"O Balle Balle, Din Dhale, Hawa Jab Chale"	Kishore Kumar, Shamshad Begum
"Sun Mere Rasiya, Balam Manbasiya, Jana Na Jana Na"	Kishore Kumar, Asha Bhosle
"A B C, Mere Sapno Mein Chori Chori Aaya Karo Ji"	Kishore Kumar, Asha Bhosle
"Kehti Hai Yeh Thandi Hawa"	Asha Bhosle
"Duniya Mein Aake Jisne"	Asha Bhosle
"Dekhoon Kab Tak Teri"	Asha Bhosle
