= Pratima Devi (Hindi actress) =

Indian actress (1910–1993)

- Born: Khairunnisa Suleiman; 1910; Chandagaon, Bombay Presidency, British India (present-day Gandhinagar, Gujarat, India)
- Died: 29 January 1993 (aged 82–83); Bombay, Maharashtra, India (present-day Mumbai, Maharashtra, India)
- Occupation: Film actor
- Years active: 1938–1983

Pratima Devi (born Khairunnisa Suleiman; 1910 – 29 January 1993) was an Indian character actress in the Indian film industry, active from the 1930s to the 1980s. Right from the beginning of her career, she starred in motherly roles, and is best remembered for playing a virtuous and upright mother to leading stars.

== Early life ==
She was born in a family belonging to the Khoja community and was the eldest of the three daughters of Suleiman Sherief who shifted to Bombay with his family. She was married off to a distant relative but got divorced while being pregnant. She later gave birth to a boy who died within few hours of his birth.

== Career ==
She was noticed and discovered by Himanshu Rai, the doyen of Bombay Talkies who offered her a role in his film Nirmala in which she essayed the role of Ashok Kumar's mother. She took on elderly roles, of a mother, an aunt or even a grandmother as her career progressed. In a career spanning 45 years, Pratima featured in nearly 200 films sharing screen alongside actors like Ashok Kumar, V. Shantaram, Bhagwan Dada, Dilip Kumar, Dev Anand, Meena Kumari, Hema Malini and Amitabh Bachchan to name a few. She was often mis-credited as Protima Devi, Prathima Devi and Pratima in many films. She acted as mother to Ashok Kumar in most of his films ranging from Nirmala in 1938 to Pakeezah in 1972.

== Death ==
Pratima Devi breathed her last on 29 January 1993, she was 82.

== Selected filmography ==
Year	Film	Role
1938	Nirmala	Ramdas's mother
1942	Sharda	
1943	Ladaai Ke Baad	Laxmi Devi
1944	Draupadi	
1945	Ek Dinn ka Sultan	Kausar's mother
1946	Dr. Kotnis Ki Amar Kahani	Dr. Kotnis's mother
1947	Dard	Begum
1948	Anokhi Ada	Laatsaheb's mother
1949	Dulari	Kamini G. Shankar
1950	Jogan	Maha Maa
1951	Albela	Pyarelal's mother
1952	Sangdil	Badi Maa
1953	Parineeta	Shekhar's Aunt
1954	Chandni Chowk	Akbar's mother
1955	Bandish	Kamal Roy's mother
1955	Seema	Superintendent Didi
1955	Devdas	Harimati Mukherjee
1956	Mem Sahib	Sunder's mother
1957	Naya Daur	Rajni's mother
1958	Dilli Ka Thug	Kishore Kumar Sharma's mother
1959	Kaagaz Ke Phool	Mother of Rakesh Verma (Rocky) & Veena Verma Sinha
1959	Paigham	Mother of Ram Lal & Rattan Lal
1960	Dil Apna Aur Preet Parai	Dr. Sushil Kumar Verma's Mother
1962	Professor	Preetam Khanna's mother
1962	Sahib Bibi Aur Ghulam	Badi Bahu
1963	Bahurani	Dai Maa
1963	Tere Ghar Ke Samne	Mrs. Karamchand
1964	Shagoon	Geeta's mother
1966	Mamta	Mother Mary
1967	Jewel Thief	Police Commissioner's wife
1968	Saathi	Shanti's mother
1969	Mahal	Rajesh's mother
1970	Saas Bhi Kabhi Bahu Thi	Laxmi Chaudhary
1972	Pakeezah	Salim Ahmad Khan's grandmother
1972	Seeta Aur Geeta	Seeta's and Geeta's grandmother
1972	Victoria No. 203	Beggar
1974	Benaam	Mrs. Verma
1975	Khushboo	Lakhi's grandmother
1976	Maha Chor	Blind slum dweller
1977	Amar Akbar Anthony	Laxmi's grandmother
1978	Naukri	Ranjit's mother
1981	Bulundi	Harish's mother
1982	Bemisal	Dr. Goel's sister
1983	Pukar	Deaf lady
