= Shahnawaz Pradhan =

Indian actor (died 2023)

- Born: 1963; Raj Khariar, Nuapada, Odisha, India
- Died: 17 February 2023 (aged 59)
- Occupations: Actor, voice actor
- Years active: 1989–2023

Shahnawaz Pradhan (1963 – 17 February 2023) was an Indian television and film actor, best known for his portrayal of Sindbad the Sailor in the popular fantasy television series, Alif Laila (1993–97), Nand Baba in Ramanand Sagar's epic TV serial Shree Krishna and Hafiz Saeed in Phantom. He has also acted in the Marathi serial Kahe Diya Pardes, telecast on Zee Marathi.

== Filmography ==
=== Television ===
Year	Serial	Role	Channel	Notes
1993	Dekh Bhai Dekh	Inspector	DD National	
1993–1997	Alif Laila	Sindbad	DD National	Daaku Asvandiyar in Ali baba aur 40 chor
1993	Krishna	Nanda Baba	DD National	
1993–1997	Byomkesh Bakshi	Inspector Barat in the episodes Chiriya Ghar (Part 1 & 2) and Kahen Kavi Kalidas	DD National	credited as Shahnawaz
2008–2009	Bandhan Saat Janamon Ka		DD National	
2005	Hari Mirchi Lal Mirchi	Ritu's father	DD National	
2012–2013	The Suite Life of Karan & Kabir		Disney Channel India	
2013	24	KK, inspired by campaign manager Carl Webb	Colors TV	
2013	Tota Weds Maina		SAB TV	
2016–2017	Kahe Diya Pardes	Mataprasad Shukla	Zee Marathi	

=== Films ===
Year	Film	Role	Notes
1999	Pyaar Koi Khel Nahin	Jeevan	
2007	Jay Jagannath	Royal Priest	
2014	Raja Natwarlal		
2015	Phantom	Hafiz Saeed	
2017	Raees	Ujjwalbhai	

=== Web series ===
- Better Life Foundation
- AIB: The Commentaries - Ghar Wapsi
- Mirzapur 2018 - Inspector Parshuram Gupta
- Hotstar - 2019 (Jio Hotstar)
- Hostages - 2020 (Jio Hotstar)
- Staffroom: Vice Principal Ajay Grover

== Dubbing roles ==
=== Animated series ===
Title	Original voice	Character	Dub language	Original language	No. of episodes	Original year release	Dub year release	Notes
Love, Death & Robots	Michael Benyaer	Dr. Wehunt	Hindi	English	18 (dubbed 1)	15 March 2019 – present		Episode: "Sucker of Souls"

=== Live action films ===
==== Foreign language films ====
Title	Original actor	Character	Dub language	Original language	Original year release	Dub year release	Notes
Pirates of the Caribbean: The Curse of the Black Pearl	Jonathan Pryce	Governor Weatherby Swann	Hindi	English	2003	2003	
Pirates of the Caribbean: Dead Man's Chest	Jonathan Pryce	Governor Weatherby Swann	Hindi	English	2006	2006	
Pirates of the Caribbean: At World's End	Jonathan Pryce	Governor Weatherby Swann	Hindi	English	2007	2007	
The Chronicles of Narnia: The Voyage of the Dawn Treader	Various actors	Various characters	Hindi	English	2010	2010	Shahnawaz's name was mentioned on the Hindi dub credits, of the DVD release of the film, also containing the Tamil and Telugu credits.
The Prestige	Michael Caine	John Cutter	Hindi	English	2006	2006	
Batman	Michael Gough	Alfred Pennyworth	Hindi	English	1989	Unknown	
Batman Returns	Michael Gough	Alfred Pennyworth	Hindi	English	1992	Unknown	
Batman Forever	Michael Gough	Alfred Pennyworth	Hindi	English	1995	Unknown	
Batman & Robin	Michael Gough	Alfred Pennyworth	Hindi	English	1997	Unknown	
Batman Begins	Michael Caine	Alfred Pennyworth	Hindi	English	2005	2005	
The Dark Knight	Michael Caine	Alfred Pennyworth	Hindi	English	2008	2008	
The Dark Knight Rises	Michael Caine	Alfred Pennyworth	Hindi	English	2012	2012	
The Amazing Spider-Man	Martin Sheen	Ben Parker	Hindi	English	2012	2012	
Inception	Michael Caine	Professor Stephen Miles	Hindi	English	2010	2010	Voiced this character in the first dub by Main Frame Software Communications.

==== Indian films ====
Title	Original actor	Character	Dub language	Original language	Original year release	Dub year release	Notes
Anniyan	Nedumudi Venu † (voice in original version dubbed by S. N. Surendar)	Parthasarathy	Hindi	Tamil	2005	2006	The Hindi dub was titled: Aparichit: The Stranger.
Anniyan	Cochin Haneefa †	Delinquent car owner	Hindi	Tamil	2005	2006	The Hindi dub was titled: Aparichit: The Stranger.
Sivaji: The Boss	Cochin Haneefa †	A. Kuzhandhaivel (A. Kumarvelu in Hindi version)	Hindi	Tamil	2007	2008	
Enthiran	Cochin Haneefa †	Traffic police officer	Hindi	Tamil	2010	2010	The Hindi dub was titled: Robot.
Dookudu	Chandra Mohan	Tulasi Ram	Hindi	Telugu	2011	2012	The Hindi dub was titled: The Real Tiger.
Nagavalli	Various Characters	Painter, Groom's father, Doctor	Hindi	Telugu	2010	2011	The Hindi dub was titled: Mera Badla - Revenge as Chandramukhi 2.
Brindavanam	Kota Srinivasa Rao	Durga Prasad	Hindi	Telugu	2010	2012	The Hindi dub was titled: The Super Khiladi.
Khatarnak	Kota Srinivasa Rao	Dasu's father	Hindi	Telugu	2006	2012	The Hindi dub was titled: Main Hoon Khatarnak.
Shadow	Dharmavarapu Subramanyam †	Peter Penchalayya	Hindi	Telugu	2013	2013	The Hindi dub was titled: Meri Jung: One Man Army.
Shadow	Jaya Prakash Reddy †	Home Minister Naidu	Hindi	Telugu	2013	2013	The Hindi dub was titled: Meri Jung: One Man Army.
Shadow	Chalapathi Rao	D.G.	Hindi	Telugu	2013	2013	The Hindi dub was titled: Meri Jung: One Man Army.
Athadu	Kota Srinivasa Rao	Baaji Reddy (Bajirao Reddy in Hindi version)	Hindi	Telugu	2005	2013	The Hindi dub was titled: Cheetah: The Power of One.
Julayi	Kota Srinivasa Rao	MLA Varadarajulu	Hindi	Telugu	2012	2013	The Hindi dub was titled: Dangerous Khiladi.
Naayak	Kota Srinivasa Rao	Minister	Hindi	Telugu	2013	2014	The Hindi dub was titled: Double Attack.
Bejawada	Kota Srinivasa Rao	Ramana	Hindi	Telugu	2011	2013	The Hindi dub was titled: Hero the Action Man.
Race Gurram	Kota Srinivasa Rao	Hanumayya	Hindi	Telugu	2014	2014	The Hindi dub was titled: Main Hoon Lucky: The Racer.
Racha	Kota Srinivasa Rao	Baireddanna	Hindi	Telugu	2012	2014	The Hindi dub was titled: Betting Raja.
Adhinayakudu	Kota Srinivasa Rao	Politician	Hindi	Telugu	2012	2014	The Hindi dub was titled: The Action Man Adhinayakudu.
Yevadu	Kota Srinivasa Rao	Corrupt central minister	Hindi	Telugu	2014	2015	
Seethamma Vakitlo Sirimalle Chettu	Kota Srinivasa Rao	Brahmananda Rao	Hindi	Telugu	2013	2015	The Hindi dub was titled: Sabse Badhkar Hum 2.
Denikaina Ready	Kota Srinivasa Rao	Rudrama Naidu	Hindi	Telugu	2012	2015	The Hindi dub was titled: Sabse Badi Hera Pheri 2.
Denikaina Ready	Chalapathi Rao	ACP K. Divakar	Hindi	Telugu	2012	2015	The Hindi dub was titled: Sabse Badi Hera Pheri 2.
Rudhramadevi	Jaya Prakash Reddy †	Amba Devudu	Hindi	Telugu	2015	2015	
Mirchi	Nagineedu	Uma's older brother	Hindi	Telugu	2013	2015	The Hindi dub was titled: Khatarnak Khiladi.
Cameraman Gangatho Rambabu	Kota Srinivasa Rao	Ex-Chief Minister Jawahar Naidu	Hindi	Telugu	2012	2016	The Hindi dub was titled: Mera Target.
Vedalam	Thambi Ramaiah	Thamizh (Trisha in Hindi version)'s blind father	Hindi	Tamil	2015	2016	
Saamy	Kota Srinivasa Rao	Ilaiya Perumal (Perumal Pichai) Annachi	Hindi	Tamil	2003	2016	The Hindi dub was titled: Policewala Gunda 3.
Pataas	Jaya Prakash Reddy †	Central Minister JP	Hindi	Telugu	2015	2016	
Bengal Tiger	Boman Irani	Chief Minister Ashok Gajapathi	Hindi	Telugu	2015	2016	
Son of Satyamurthy	Kota Srinivasa Rao	Devaraj's father	Hindi	Telugu	2015	2016	
Govindudu Andarivadele	Kota Srinivasa Rao	Balaraju's brother	Hindi	Telugu	2014	2016	The Hindi dub was titled: Yevadu 2.
Jil	Chalapathi Rao	Jai's uncle	Hindi	Telugu	2015	2016	
Ajay	Doddanna	Home Minister	Hindi	Kannada	2006	2016	The Hindi dub was titled: Zabardast Tevar.
Doosukeltha	Kota Srinivasa Rao	Rajeshwar	Hindi	Tamil	2013	2017	The Hindi dub was titled: Dangerous Khiladi 6.
Saagasam	Kota Srinivasa Rao	Varatharajan	Hindi	Tamil	2016	2017	The Hindi dub was titled: Jeene Nahi Doonga 2.
Duvvada Jagannadham	Rallapalli Narasimha †	DJ's grandfather	Hindi	Telugu	2017	2017	The Hindi dub was titled: DJ.
Terror	Kota Srinivasa Rao	Home minister	Hindi	Telugu	2016	2017	
All in All Azhagu Raja	Kota Srinivasa Rao	Chokkanathan	Hindi	Tamil	2013	2018	The Hindi dub was titled: Hero No. Zero 2.
Sketch	Vela Ramamoorthy	Sketch's father	Hindi	Tamil	2018	2018	
Jawaan	Kota Srinivasa Rao	Jai's uncle	Hindi	Telugu	2017	2018	
Paisa Vasool	Prudhviraj	Advocate Pruthviraj	Hindi	Telugu	2017	2018	
Achari America Yatra	Kota Srinivasa Rao	Dadaji	Hindi	Telugu	2018	2019	The Hindi dub was titled: Thugs of America.
Desamuduru	Ahuti Prasad †	C.I. A. Prasad	Hindi	Telugu	2007	2020	The Hindi dub was titled: Ek Jwalamukhi.
Vada Chennai	Radha Ravi	Muthu	Hindi	Tamil	2018	2020	The Hindi dub was titled: Chennai Central.
Sita	Kota Srinivasa Rao	Basava's father-in-law	Hindi	Telugu	2019	2020	The Hindi dub was titled: Sita Ram.
Siruthai	Santhana Bharathi	Home Minister	Hindi	Tamil	2011	2020	
Idhaya Thirudan	M. S. Bhaskar	Unknown	Hindi	Tamil	2006	2020	The Hindi dub was titled: Mard Ki Zaban 3.
Avunu Valliddaru Ista Paddaru!	Kota Srinivasa Rao	Anand's father	Hindi	Telugu	2002	2020	The Hindi dub was titled: Main Tera Tu Meri.
Kaithi	Hareesh Peradi	Stephen Raj	Hindi	Tamil	2019	2020	
Naa Alludu	Kota Srinivasa Rao	Bilahari	Hindi	Telugu	2005	2021	The Hindi dub was titled: Main Hoon Gambler.
Soorarai Pottru	Poo Ramu	Rajangam	Hindi	Tamil	2020	2021	The Hindi dub was titled: Udaan.
Aathi	Nassar	Ramachandran	Hindi	Tamil	2006	2021	The Hindi dub was titled: Aadhi Naath.
Asuran	A. Venkatesh	Viswanathan	Hindi	Tamil	2019	2021	
ABCD: American Born Confused Desi	Kota Srinivasa Rao	Koteswara	Hindi	Telugu	2019	2021	
Dhill	Nassar	Chief of Police Training Academy	Hindi	Tamil	2001	2021	The Hindi dub was titled: Meri Aan: Man In Work.
Munna	Kota Srinivasa Rao	Minister Srinivas Rao	Hindustani	Telugu	2007	2021	The Hindustani dub was titled: Rowdy Munna.
Pushpa: The Rise	Rajsekhar Aningi	Subba Reddy	Hindi	Telugu	2021	2021	
Chatrapathi	Kota Srinivasa Rao	Appala Nayudu	Hindi	Telugu	2005	2021	The Hindi dub was titled: Hukumat Ki Jung.
Bheeshma	Anant Nag (voice in original version dubbed by Subhalekha Sudhakar)	Bheeshma Sr.	Hindi	Telugu	2020	2022	
Mersal	Sangili Murugan	Salim Ghosh	Hindi	Tamil	2017	2022	
Lakshyam	Kota Srinivasa Rao	Chandu (Sahil in Hindustani version) and Bose's father	Hindustani	Telugu	2007	2022	
Sarileru Neekevvaru	Tanikella Bharani	Minister	Hindi	Telugu	2020	2022	
Sarileru Neekevvaru	Meka Rama Krishna	Bharathi's son-in-law's father	Hindi	Telugu	2020	2022	

=== Animated films ===
Title	Original voice	Character	Dub language	Original language	Original year release	Dub year release	Notes
Toy Story	Don Rickles †	Mr. Potato Head	Hindi	English	1995	1995	
Toy Story 2	Don Rickles †	Mr. Potato Head	Hindi	English	1999	1999	
Toy Story 3	Don Rickles †	Mr. Potato Head	Hindi	English	2010	2010	
Toy Story 4	Don Rickles †	Mr. Potato Head	Hindi	English	2019	2019	
The Adventures of Tintin	Unknown	Old man seller	Hindi	English	2011	2011	
