= Shri Krishna (1993 TV series) =

Indian epic television series

- Also known as: Krishna
- Created by: Ramanand Sagar
- Based on: Bhagavata Purana; Harivamsa; Garga Samhita; Vishnu Purana; Padma Purana; Brahma Vaivarta Purana; Bhagvad Gita; Mahabharata
- Written by: Ramanand Sagar
- Screenplay by: Ramanand Sagar
- Directed by: Ramanand Sagar; Anand Sagar; Moti Sagar
- Starring: Sarvadaman D. Banerjee; Pinky Parikh; Reshma Modi
- Music by: Ravindra Jain
- Country of origin: India
- Original language: Hindi
- No. of seasons: 1

Production
- Producers: Ramanand Sagar; Prem Sagar; Subhash Sagar
- Editors: Girish Dawda; Moreshwar R. Mishra; Sahdev; Um Bahadur Bisht; Anil Pradhan; P. Vedachallam; Vinay Ashtaputre
- Camera setup: Multi-camera
- Running time: 25–55 minutes
- Production company: Sagar Arts

Original release
- Network: DD Metro (1993–1996); DD National (1997); Zee TV (1999)
- Release: 18 July 1993 – 1999

Shri Krishna, also known as Krishna, is a 1993–1999 Indian Hindi-language television series, created, written and directed by Ramanand Sagar. It is an adaptation of the stories of the life of Krishna, based on the Srimad Bhagavatam, Brahma Vaivarta Purana, Harivamsa, Vishnu Purana, Padma Purana, Garga Samhita, Bhagavad Gita and Mahabharata. The series has a total of 221 episodes.

Shri Krishna was first broadcast on DD Metro in 1993 and it continued on through 1996; it later continued on DD National (which was called DD1 at the time) in 1997, but as DD refused to stream Gita Sermon, Vajranabha, and Banasura's Ego-Breaking, it was completely re-telecasted on Zee TV in 1999, It also streamed on Sony Entertainment Television in 2001, It was later re-telecasted on DD National in the lockdown after Ramayan and Mahabharat ended. It surpassed both the serials in terms of TRP, and was re-telecast on public demand during the lockdown in 2020 due to COVID-19 after the completion of Ramayan, Shri Krishna aired on DD from 03 May to 16 December 2020, this serial was made in Hindi but has also been dubbed in languages like Telugu, Tamil etc. This serial enjoyed number 1 in terms of TRP till the 21st week of airing.

According to The Hindustan Times, "Shri Krishna was one of the biggest grossers for Doordarshan during the seven years it was on air".

== Premise ==
This series covers various aspects of Krishna's life, including his birth, childhood antics, his role in the kingdom of Mathura, his teachings in the Bhagavad Gita, and his crucial role in the Kurukshetra War, a central event in the Mahabharata. It also delves into his relationships with characters like Radha, his childhood friend, and his interactions with other gods, demons, and mortals.

In the first episode Ramanand Sagar talks about the beginning of the Kali Yuga period, and about king Parikshit being the last king who followed principles of Dharma and his encounter with Kali. It also shows a glimpse of the Mahabharata War.

Then the series starts focusing on Shri Krishna's life like his childhood antics, and dives into his relationship with Radha, and Balrama's marriage with Revati, Nara-Narayana, Syamantaka incident, Satybhama, Jambavati's Marriage to Krishna, Rukmi's antics and Krishna's Marriage to Rukmini, Yudhishthira being declared as the crown price of Indraprastha, Lakshagriha incident, Meeting of Krishna-Sudama, Pradyumna's lifestory, Paundraka Vasudeva's torture on Veermani and Tara (Tarini), Draupadi's Disrobing, The Mahabharata war, Vajranabha's life, Aniruddha-Usha marriage, Banasura-ego breaking.

== Cast ==
=== Main ===
- Sarvadaman D. Banerjee as Krishna, Vishnu, and Narayana
  - Swapnil Joshi as adolescent Krishna (1993)
  - Ashok Kumar Balkrishnan as Child Krishna (1993)
  - Palak as Child Krishna (1993)
- Deepak Deulkar as Balarama and Sheshanaga (1996)
  - Sanjeev Sharma as teenage Balarama (1993-1994)
- Pinky Parikh as Rukmini, Lakshmi, Yamuna and Durga (1996)
- Reshma Modi as Radha (1993)
  - Shweta Rastogi as Teenage Radha and Lakshmi (1993)
- Sandeep Mohan as Arjuna and Nara
- Phalguni Parikh as Draupadi
- Govind Khatri as Karna
- Kumar Hegde as Duryodhana
- Raman Khatri as Dharmarajā
- Mahendra Ghule as Bhima and Hanuman
- Mukul Nag as Ashwatthama and Sudama
- Premchand Sharma as Pandu and Nakula
- Ashish Kadam as Sahadeva
- Dinesh Anand as Dushasana
  - Deepak Jethi replaced Dinesh Anand in later episodes

=== Recurring ===
- Mona Parekh as Jambavati
- Shashi Sharma as Satyabhama
  - Shashi also portrayed other characters as well
- Deepak Dave and Sagar Saini as Narada
- Vijay Kavish as Ugrasena and Shiva (1993)
  - Amit Pachori as Shiva (1996)
- Lata Haya as Kunti
- Sunil Nagar as Bhishma
- Jayprakash Sharma as Shakuni
- Kanu Patel as Drona and Suryadeva
- Tarakesh Chauhan as Dhritarashtra
- Jyotin Dave as Indra
- Anuj Sharma as Abhimanyu
- Amit Bhalla as Kripa
- Vijay Sharma as Vidura
- Aslam Khan as Various Roles
- Suneel Mattoo as Kritavarma
- Neela Patel as Gandhari

=== Episodic appearance ===
- Girish Pardeshi as Shiva and Suryadev (During the Samudra Manthana)
- Manish Sharma as Pradyumna
- Anupama Pardeshi as Mohini
- Navneet Chaddha as Aniruddha
- Sonia Kapoor as Subhadra
- Bashir Khan as Bhasmasura, Dwivida, Mayasura (Shambara's son) and Maya Danava
- Sanjeev Siddharth as Bhaumasura
- Arvind Singh Rausariya as Kālayavana, Sage Gargyata (also known as Gārgyat Muni, father of Kaal Yavana and Rājguru of Trigart kingdom), Shambara's Rājguru and Vajranābha
- Shakti Singh and Unknown as Banasura
- Pradeep Nishit as Drupada, Parshurama and Vyasa (1995–1999)
- Gautam Chaturvedi as Paundraka Vasudeva
- Arun Mathur as Shambara
- Niharika Bhatt as Shambara's wife, Vajranābha's Grandmother
- Jharna Dave as Māyāvati, Hidimbi and Durga
- Radhakrishna Dutta as Uttanka, Vishwakarma and Jarasandha
- Neel Kamal as Kumbhketu (Shambarasura's Son)
- Damini Kanwal Shetty (Seema Kanwal) as Yashoda
- Sulakshana Khatri as Rohini
- Shahnawaz Pradhan as Nanda Baba, Shurasena, Chanura and Maha Bali
- Vilas Raj as Kamsa
- Jyotin Dave as King Shalya and
- Ravi Raj as Sage Garga
- Bhakti Narula as Tarini
- Raj Premi as Shishupala, Hiranyakashyap and Jaya
- Paulomi Mukherjee as Devaki (1993)
- Sunil Pandey as Vasudeva (1993)
- Deepali Thosar as Rati (1996)
- Prairna Agrawal as Vasundhara
- Papiya Sengupta as Lalita
- Shyam Sunder Kalani as Chanura (Episode - 3)
- Swati Anand as second wife of Maharaja Brihadratha of Magadha and Jarasandha's mother, Revati, Shikhandini, Amba, and Chitralekha (1994-1999)
- Sunil Chauhan as Uddhava (1993)
- Pramod Kapoor as Kali, Akrura and Jayadratha
- Girish Pardeshi as Kama
- Sarita Devi as an old woman who sells fruits (Episode - 22)

== Production ==
Shri Krishna was produced by Ramanand Sagar, Subhash Sagar, and Prem Sagar under the banner "Sagar Enterprises" and directed by Ramanand Sagar, Anand Sagar, and Moti Sagar. The role of young Krishna was played by Swapnil Joshi and adult Krishna was played by Sarvadaman D. Banerjee. Govind Khatri was initially roped in to play the role of Dushasan, however later ended with the role of Karna.

Filming took place in Gujarat, in particular in Umbergaon and Vadodara, where "huge sets" had been installed.

Ramanand Sagar's television serial "Shri Krishna" made history in advertisement revenue for DD by earning the highest ever advertisement revenue by a single serial for DD by crossing the Rs. 70 crore mark; it was the No. 1 TRP (Television Rating Points), while on the Metro channel, it earned a record of Rs.14.31 crore as advertisement revenue for DD Metro in the first year run on the network.

”The national broadcaster had a limit on the number of episodes it could air in the ’80s, but the ’90s brought about a change in these rules. A producer could now make a show for a longer duration.”, commented Kavita Awasthi in The Hindustan Times.

Most of the characters were dubbed by dubbing artists like Deepak Sinha, Pawan Shukla, Shakti Singh, Dilip Sinha, etc.

=== Direction ===
Shri Krishna was produced by Ramanand Sagar and Prem Sagar under the banner of “Sagar Enterprises” and directed by Ramanand Sagar. The series was shot at Vrindavan studio, Umargaon studio and then later at the Sagar Film City, Vadodara. It was a massive family effort; especially the entire Mahabharata war sequences were shot by multiple cameras using multiple creative directions from Sagar Family members.

"The visual depiction of the Bhagwat Geeta by late Dr Ramanand Sagar is a treat to watch for film-makers, on how an abstract and philosophical subject like the Geeta can be re-told in for mass media communication."- quote from the directors

The role of young Krishna was played by Swapnil Joshi and adult Krishna was played by Sarvadaman D. Banerjee. Both the actors became hugely popular after the telecast. Swapnil Joshi is still an actor in the Marathi film industry, and Banerjee quit acting and now teaches meditation in Rishikesh, but later returned to acting in 2016. He supports the NGO "Pankh", which provides free education to slum children and livelihood skills to underprivileged women of Uttarakhand.

The salary for one episode was ₹3500, and every month, this salary increased by ₹1000.

== Home media ==
In 2014, Reliance Home Video & Games and Moser Baer released it on DVDs.

== Reception ==
The series was a popular success to the point that, according to Kavita Awaasthi in The Hindustan Times, "Swapnil had a huge fan following because of the show. People thought he was Krishna."

== See also ==
- Ramayan (1987 TV series)
- Mahabharat (1988 TV series)
