= Alif Laila =

Indian television series from 1993 to 2002

- Also known as: Arabian Nights
- Genre: Fantasy
- Based on: One Thousand and One Nights
- Screenplay by: Ramanand Sagar
- Directed by: Anand Sagar; Prem Sagar; Moti Sagar
- Theme music composer: Ravindra Jain
- Opening theme: Krishna M. Gupta
- Ending theme: Krishna M. Gupta
- Composer: Ravindra Jain
- Country of origin: India
- Original languages: Hindi; Urdu
- No. of seasons: 2
- No. of episodes: 303

Production
- Producer: Subhash Sagar
- Running time: 22 Minutes
- Production company: Sagar Arts

Original release
- Network: DD1 (season 1); SAB TV (season 2)
- Release: 1993 – 2002

Alif Laila is an Indian television series based on the One Thousand and One Nights, also known as the Arabian Nights. It was produced by Sagar Pictures Entertainment. It was made in two seasons. The series was telecast from 1993 to 1997 on DD National and from 2001 to 2002 on SAB TV, totalling 303 episodes.

The plotline of the series starts from the very beginning when Shahrzad starts telling stories to Shahryar and includes both the well-known and the lesser-known stories from the One Thousand and One Nights. The title Alif Laila is a short form of the original Arabic title of the One Thousand and One Nights - Alif Layla wa-Layla (Arabic: ألف ليلة وليلة).

== Stories ==
=== Season 1 (1993–1997) on DD1 ===
- Prologue to the story of King Shahryar and Queen Shahrzad
- Ep 03–06 – The Trader and the Genie (Taajir aur Jinn)
- Ep 07–09 – Story of the First Traveller (Pahla Musaafir aur Do Kutton ki Kahaani)
- Ep 10–13 – Story of the Second Traveller (Doosra Musaafir aur Bakri ki Kahaani)
- Ep 14–15 – The Fisherman and the Genie (Maahigir aur Jinn)
- Ep 16–18 – Tale of the Vizier and the Sage Duban (Hakeem Dobaan ki Kahaani)
- Ep 19-33 – Aladdin and the Magic Lamp (Aladeen aur Jaadui Chiraagh)
- Ep 34–47 – Ali Baba and the Forty Thieves (Ali Baba aur Chaalis Chor)
- Ep 48-49 – Sinbad the Sailor (Sindbad Jahaazi)
- Ep 50–55 – Sindbad's First Voyage (Prince Gulfam and Jadugarni Azbela & Jadugar Bargwan)
- Ep 56–69 – Sindbad's Second Voyage (Maut Ki Vaadi)
- Ep 70–89 – Sindbad's Third Voyage (Nigaristan)
- Ep 90–106 – Sindbad's Fourth Voyage (Kaala Jazeera)
- Ep 107–135 – Prince Jalal Talib and Malika Hamira (Shahzaada Jalaal Taalib aur Malika Hameera)
- Ep 136–143 – Prince Jamal Saqib and Princess Mahapara (Shahzaada Jamaal Saaqib aur Shahzaadi Mahapaara)
- Epilogue to the story of Shahryar and Shahrzad

=== Season 2 (2001–2002) on SAB TV ===
- The Night-Adventures of Caliph Harun al-Rashid (Khaleefa Haarun al-Rasheed ke Gashte)
- Ep 02–10 – Story of the Blind Man (Andhe Faqeer Jamaal ki Kahaani)
- Ep 11–27 – Zishan and Sofonisba (Zishaan aur Sofonisba); loosely based on the History of Sidi Nu'uman
- Ep 28–35 – History of Khwajah Hasan al-Khabbal (Khwaaja Hasan Khabaal ki Kahaani)
- Ep 36–83 – Two Brothers Jalal and Bilal (Do Bhaai Jalaal aur Bilaal)
- Ep 84–103 – Prince Afat and Firoza vs Firoz (Prince Afat aur Firoza banaam Firoz)
- Ep 104–160 – Sindbad's Four Skull Raids (Sindbad ka Chaar Khopdi abhijan)
- End-of-night adventures of Harun al-Rashid Mohammed Shakib Reza

== Cast ==
=== Main ===
- Girija Shankar as King Shahryar
- Damini Kanwal Shetty as Queen Shahrzad

=== Recurring ===
- Navdeep Singh as Aladdin
- Papiya Sengupta as princess Gulafsha of Naglistaan
- Mukul Nag as prince Jamal Saakib
- Sunil Pandey as Sabeer Ahmed, Ali Baba
- Shahnawaz Pradhan as Sindbad, Royal Vizier (Prologue), Clone Badrous, Thief Asfandyaar
- Vilas Raj as Qehermaan, Zingalu Zungla
- Jharna Dave as Zubeidaa
- Tarakesh Chauhan as Jalal Talib / Harun-Ar Rashid
- Mona Parikh as Princess Tayyabah
- Lata Haya (née Lata Nagar) as witch-queen Hameera
- Pinky Parikh as Duraksha, Fairy Zeba Zeemi Shaheen, Marjina, Princess Badroulbadour and witch-queen Taaguti
- Jyotin Dave as Shah Of Baghdad
- Mulraj Rajda as Hakim Douban
- Neela Patel as Fisherman's wife, Aladdin's mother, Shah of Baghdad's consort, Queen Zamaani of Shahristaan
- Sanjeev Sharma as Haasim, Daniel
- Sulakshana Khatri as witch Asbela & Princess of corpses Asjaar Salatiya
- Radha Yadav as Dilshad, Mother of kidnapped child (Sinbad arc)
- Pramod Kapoor as merchant Sirajuddin Shareef Zardaari, prince Gulfaam/Shah Khurram of Mehrabaad/sorcerer Misri, Sorcerer Azgar, King Baazik
- Kumar Hegde as Shape-Shifter Halkaash
- Sunil Nagar as King Of Nigaristan
- Aslam Khan as Kiled Brother
- Sanjay Bn Sharma as Tabbak Jinn
- Dayal Singh Kashyap as Qayamat Jinn
- Hyder Kazmi as Jadugar Talimosh
- Neha Grewal as Heena (Fairy)
- Swati Anand as Sofonisba / Sharara Gul
- Ritambhara Sahni as Ismatjahan
- Yashodhan Rana as Sindbad
- Firoz Ali as Shehzada Afak

== Home media ==
The episodes of Alif Laila were released on both VCD and DVD format from Moserbaer. The DVD release was marketed as 20 volumes consisting of 143 episodes.

== Broadcast ==
Alif Laila first aired on DD1, and later, Season 2 was broadcast on SAB TV.
