= R. C. Talwar =

Indian film director (born 1910)

- Born: Raghbir Chand Talwar; April 21, 1910
- Occupations: Film director; producer; screenwriter
- Known for: Sangdil (1952); Ilzaam (1954); Mem Sahib (1956)

Raghbir Chand Talwar (21 April 1910 - ?), better known as R. C. Talwar, was an Indian film director, producer and screenwriter. In the 2023 book Pre-Partition Punjab's Contribution to Indian Cinema, author Ishtiaq Ahmed described Talwar as "the longest living Punjabi" who used to reside in Bombay (now Mumbai).

== Early life ==
He was born in Talagang, Chakwal in Punjab, British India (now in Pakistan).

== Career ==
Talwar's directorial career began with the Punjabi film Pardesi Dhola in 1941 and continued until Naya Kanoon in 1965. He was known for working closely with J. S. Casshyap and Ramanand Sagar, both of whom wrote the dialogue for several of his films. In 1952, Talwar directed and produced a loose adaptation of Charlotte Brontë's Jane Eyre: the Hindi-language romantic drama Sangdil, which became one of the year's highest-grossing films. While contemporary critic Baburao Patel bemoaned that Talwar "fail[ed] to infuse any life" into the drama, Ahmed retrospectively wrote that Sangdil demonstrated Talwar's "masterly skills in exploiting Dilip Kumar and Madhubala's histrionic talents".

Talwar worked with actors Kishore Kumar and Meena Kumari in three films, Ilzam (1954), Rukhsana (1955) and Mem Sahib (1956). The latter, which was also written by Talwar, is noted for its unconventional story in which a wealthy, independent woman (played by Kumari) seeks her own romantic partner, refusing to marry the man selected by her father. Contemporary reviews in The Times of India were positive toward both films: Ilzam was praised for its "delightful entertainment", while Mem Sahib was described as an "amusing comedy with social slant".

== Filmography ==
Year	Title	Language	Producer	Director	Ref.
1941	Pardesi Dhola	Punjabi		Yes	
1943	Manchali	Hindi		Yes	
1945	Albeli	Hindi		Yes	
1950	Khiladi	Hindi	Yes	Yes	
1952	Khamoshi	Hindi		Yes	
1952	Sangdil	Hindi	Yes	Yes	
1952	Saqi	Hindi	Yes	Harnam Singh Rawail	
1954	Ilzam	Hindi	Yes	Yes	
1955	Rukhsana	Hindi	Yes	Yes	
1956	Mem Sahib	Hindi	Yes	Yes	
1963	Ek Dil Sau Afsane	Hindi	Yes	Yes	
1965	Naya Kanoon	Hindi	Girdharilal Manchanda	Yes	
