= Sarvadaman D. Banerjee =

Indian actor

- Born: 14 March 1965 (age 61); Magarwara, Uttar Pradesh, India
- Occupation: Actor
- Years active: 1983–2004; 2016–present

Sarvadaman D. Banerjee (born 14 March 1965) is an Indian actor who works in Telugu and Hindi language films and television series. He is best known for playing Krishna in Ramanand Sagar's hit television series Krishna (1993–97). He played the title role in the films Adi Shankaracharya (1983), which won the National Film Award for Best Feature Film and Swami Vivekananda. In the 1986 film Sirivennela, he played a blind flutist. He played the role of PKR in the 2022 Telugu film, Godfather.

== Personal life ==
Banerjee was born into a Bengali Brahmin family on 14 March 1965, in Magarwara village of Unnao district in Uttar Pradesh. He went to St. Aloysius School, Kanpur and graduated from Pune Film Institute.

He was married to Sunita Banerjee, a doctor by profession. The couple has a daughter, Aalika Banerjee, and their marriage ended in divorce. Currently he teaches yoga and meditation in Krishna Ganga Light House, Rishikesh along with his closest friend and partner Alankrita Banerjee. Banerjee supports an NGO Pankh founded by Alankrita Banerjee which provides free education to slum children and livelihood skills to underprivileged women of Uttarakhand.

== Filmography ==
=== Film ===
Year	Title	Role	Language	Notes
1983	Adi Shankaracharya	Adi Shankara	Sanskrit	
1985	Vallabhacharya Guru		Telugu	
1985	Sri Datta Darsanam	Sridatta	Telugu	
1986	Sirivennela	Pandit Hari Prasad	Telugu	
1987	Swayam Krushi	Bhaskar	Telugu	
1987	O Prema Katha		Telugu	
1991	Madhavatyana		Telugu	
1998	Swami Vivekananda	Swami Vivekananda	English	
2004	Paio Maro Bhagwan		Hindi	
2016	M. S. Dhoni: The Untold Story	Chanchal	Hindi	
2022	Godfather	PKR	Telugu	
2024	Lucky Baskhar	Prahalad Kumar	Telugu	
2025	Sankranthiki Vasthunam	Yadagiri	Telugu	
2025	Akhanda 2	Aditya Ram Bhagat	Telugu	
2026	Vishwanath & Sons	Chandrasekhar	Tamil	
2026	G.O.A.T	Telugu		

=== Television ===
Year	Title	Role	Language	Network	Notes
1993–1997	Krishna	Krishna / Vishnu	Hindi	DD National	
1995	Arjuna		Hindi		
1997–1999	Om Namah Shivay	Rajkumar Vrishdwaj	Hindi	DD National	
2001	Jai Ganga Maiya	Vishnu	Hindi		
