= Dost (1944 film) =

1944 film

- Directed by: Shaukat Hussain Rizvi
- Produced by: Navin Pictures
- Starring: Kanhaiyalal; Maya Banerjee; Agha; Motilal; Noor Jehan; Shaukat Hussain Rizvi
- Music by: Sajjad Hussain; Shams Lakhnavi (film song lyrics)
- Release date: 1944
- Country: India
- Language: Hindi

Dost (Hindi: दोस्त; English: Friend) is a 1944 Bollywood film produced under the banner Navin Pictures, directed by Shaukat Hussain Rizvi. Kanhaiyalal and Maya Banerjee play the lead with Agha, Motilal, Noor Jehan and Shaukat Hussain Rizvi in the supporting cast. The film song lyrics were written by Shams Lakhnavi, with music composed by Sajjad Hussain.

== Film's reception ==
This film ended up being ranked as number 21 on the list of (Top Earners 1940 – 1949) by the Box Office India.

== Cast ==
- Kanhaiyalal
- Maya Banerjee
- Agha
- Himalaya Dasani
- Husn Banu
- Mirza Musharraf
- Motilal
- Noorjahan
- Ram Pyari
- Shaukat Hussain Rizvi
- Sherali
- Varmala Kumthekar

== Soundtrack ==
Dost was the first film of Sajjad Hussain as an independent music director, and its soundtrack featured hit songs.

All lyrics are written by Shams Lakhnavi; all music is composed by Sajjad Hussain.

No.	Title	Singer(s)	Length
1.	"Ab Kaun Hai Mera"	Noor Jehan	1:45
2.	"Alam Par Alam Sitam Par Sitam"	Noor Jehan	3:10
3.	"Badanaam Muhabbat Kaun Kare""	Noor Jehan	3:05
4.	"Koi Prem Ka Deke Sandesa"	Noor Jehan	3:35
5.	"More Sajana Aake Daras Dikha"	Noor Jehan	3:20
