= Mem Sahib =

- Directed by: Raghbir Chand Talwar
- Written by: Screenplay : Raghbir Chand Talwar; Dialogues : Ramanand Sagar; Jamuna Swaroop Kashyap; Lyrics : Rajinder Krishan
- Produced by: Raghbir Chand Talwar
- Starring: Meena Kumari; Kishore Kumar; Shammi Kapoor
- Cinematography: Prakash Malhotra
- Edited by: P. T. Keluskar
- Music by: Madan Mohan
- Release date: 1956
- Country: India
- Language: Hindi

Mem Sahib (Note: The name alludes respectably to a woman - usually holding a high post, or very wealthy and influential. The exact translation of the name is "wife of a Sahib"; the latter in turn refers to an influential man. Interestingly a shortened version of this term is Memsaab. In fact there indeed has been a Bollywood movie with this name too!) is a 1956 Indian Hindi-language drama film, produced and directed by Raghbir Chand Talwar starring Meena Kumari, Kishore Kumar and Shammi Kapoor.

== Plot ==
Bombay-based Meena (Meena Kumari) lives a wealthy lifestyle along with her Chacha and Chachi in a mansion. When asked to marry, she places an advertisement in the local newspaper, and after interviewing many males, chooses Manohar (Shammi Kapoor) to be her future husband. She shares this news as well as introduces him to her family - who disapprove and remind her that her late father Balram had selected a groom named Sunder Lal even before she was born. She scoffs at this and announces that she will marry Manohar soon. Then Sunder (Kishore Kumar), who was living at an ashram for Brahmacharis, shows up at her home - complete in traditional ashram clothing and is ready to marry her. When facing rejection, he decides to change his lifestyle and be like Manohar - and does so - albeit with hilarious results. He is pleased when he notices a change in her and takes her home to introduce her to his mother (Pratima Devi) - little knowing that the change is only superficial - and she has a hidden agenda.

== Cast ==
- Meena Kumari as Meena
- Kishore Kumar as Sunder Lal
- Shammi Kapoor as Manohar
- Kumkum as Kamini
- Mehmood Ali as Hardeep Kumar
- Om Prakash as Brothel Patron
- Randhir as the communist
- Shivraj as Sunder's Guru
- Pratima Devi as Sunder's Mother

== Music ==
Madan Mohan was the music director while lyricist Rajinder Krishan wrote songs of this film.

Song	Singer(s)
"Dil Dil Se Milakar Dekho (Male)"	Kishore Kumar
"Dil Dil Se Milakar Dekho (Female)"	Asha Bhosle
"Ishq Ek Zahar Sahi"	Asha Bhosle
"Chuni Muni Chuniya Oye"	Asha Bhosle
"Pyar Ki Ghadiyan Gin Gin Gin"	Asha Bhosle
"Kehta Hai Dil Tum Ho Mere Liye, Mere Liye Ji, Mere Liye"	Asha Bhosle, Talat Mahmood
"Hamari Gali Aana, Achha Ji, Hamen Na Bhulana, Achha Ji"	Asha Bhosle, Talat Mahmood
