= Sikandarpur Karan =

- Village
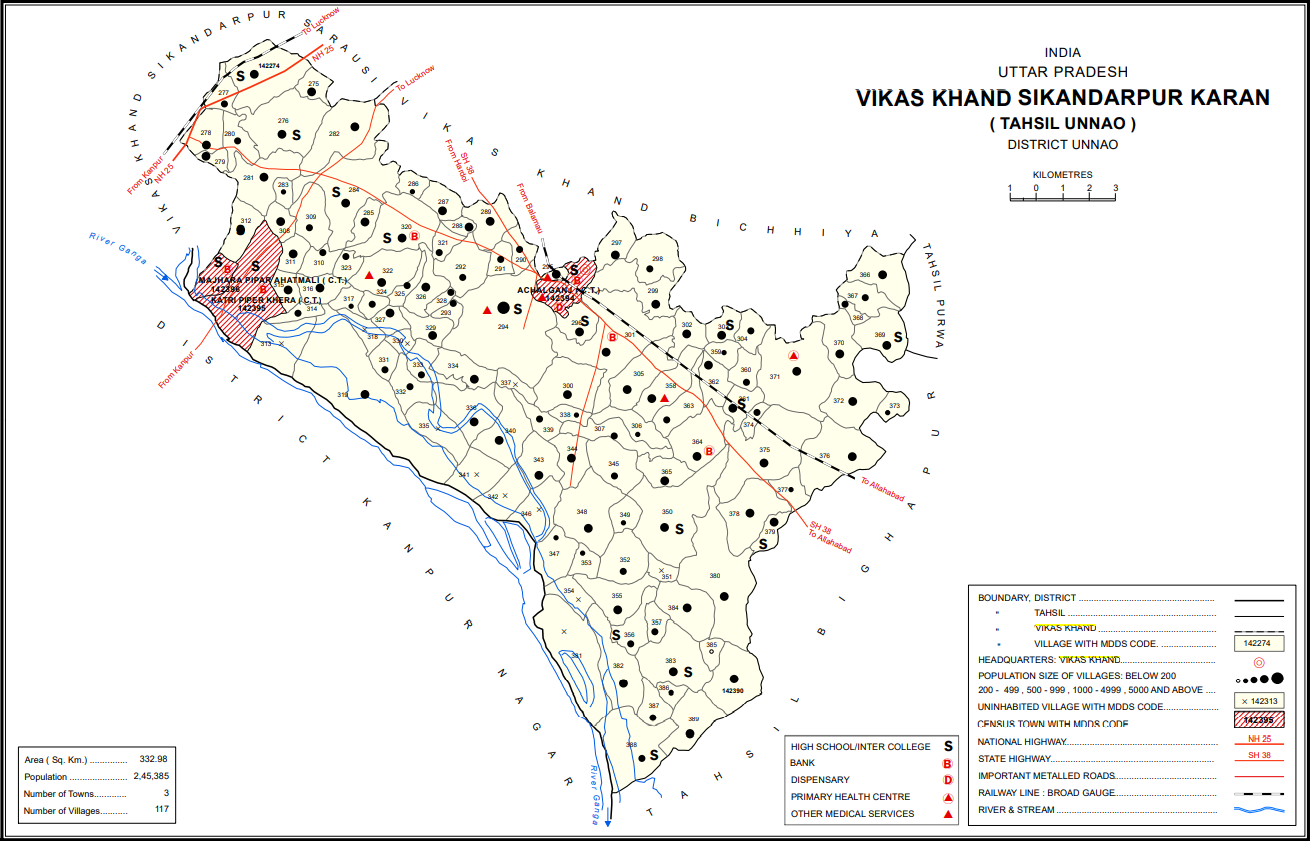
- Map of Sikandarpur Karan CD block
- Country India: India
- State: Uttar Pradesh
- District: Unnao

Area
  - Total: 5.155 km^{2} (1.990 sq mi)

Population (2011)
  - Total: 4,548
  - Density: 882.3/km^{2} (2,285/sq mi)

Languages
  - Official: Hindi
- Time zone: UTC+5:30 (IST)
- Vehicle registration: UP-35

Sikandarpur Karan is a village and corresponding community development block in Unnao district of Uttar Pradesh, India. It is connected to state highways, has five primary schools and no healthcare facilities, and hosts a daily market. As of 2011, its population is 4,548, in 836 households.

== Villages ==
Sikandarpur Karan CD block has the following 117 villages:

Village name	Total land area (hectares)	Population (in 2011)
Magarwara	479.3	6,584
Galgalha	120	1,607
Maswasi	555.2	6,530
Sahejani	95.1	770
Fatehpur	138.2	1,069
Kathadal Narain Pur	120.5	1,723
Haibatpur	165	695
Dhaudhi Rautapur	358	2,343
Sheshpur Nari	544.6	6,984
Mahadevna	94.7	415
Banthar	203.6	7,165
Ata	563.6	4,120
Bhagwatpur	79.6	232
Karaundi	145.3	1,473
Tajpur	27.4	1,048
Jagjeewan Pur	57.6	1,322
Kanti	67.1	662
Kurmapur	83.4	730
Behiti Gopalpur	39.6	856
Gadari	70.7	752
Hadha	1,471.4	10,812
Lohcha	96.2	1,316
Mawaiya Mafi	169.4	1,442
Karnipur Shivpuri	275.4	1,626
Chapri Shahpur	276.5	815
Saidpur	252	1,567
Vasaina	366.5	2,425
Benthar	915.8	5,446
Band Hameer Pur	172.2	1,596
Mainha	145.2	1,312
Bhadohi	141.4	695
Bhainshi Naubasta	370.3	2,014
Kisanpur	108.2	361
Gauri Tribhanpur	197	861
Poni	122.3	1,078
Kader Patari	257.8	769
Dakary	156	572
Karmi Vizhlamau	157.8	1,655
Majhara Piper Khera G/Ehatmali	444.4	5,899
Katri Badarka Turkiya	274.3	0
Badarka Turkiya	20.8	739
Rajwa Khera	47.1	1,879
Lakha Pur	74.1	1,016
Ramchara Mau	49.8	359
Alhuapur Saresa	7.4	0
Katri Alhuapur Sares	559.6	1,336
Badarka Harbansh	68.1	2,834
Rawal	154	842
Supasi	336.8	3,088
Sathara	172.5	736
Garsar	157.1	710
Maviya Layak	106.5	861
Chheriha	177	1,548
Tikry Ganesh Gair Ehatmali	56.1	1,302
Shukul Pur	53.2	971
Manohar Pur	188	1,975
Tikry Ganeshgair Ehatmali	101.9	0
Sakhagar	342.4	922
Bairagar	185.9	935
Tikry Padmara	173.8	731
Dudhaora	83.2	1,029
Katri Balai	568.7	0
Balai	726.6	2,176
Chak Udai Chandpur	21.7	0
Jamuni Pur	131.5	357
Ghurwa Khera	156.8	901
Malmau	377.1	1,201
Katri Malmau	134	0
Katri Khutha Naugwan	91.2	0
Khutha Naugwan	354.1	1,610
Rithanai	397.6	1,582
Jhaoha	254.8	837
Katri Majhra Bhikhna	160.3	0
Majhara Bhikhna	418.4	221
Koluhuwa Gara	563.3	2,166
Kutkuri	128.2	483
Satan	596.3	3,249
Ajabpur	860.3	0
Singha	226.1	747
Terwa	91.7	277
Nibai Ehatmali	107.4	0
Nibai Gair Ehatmali	272.2	1,458
Maharamau	172.4	550
Barua	93.9	726
Pachodda Sarai	354.4	3,767
Abhilah	104.2	446
Hasanapur	124.5	773
Rawatpur	207.4	1,276
Tikauli	255.8	1,119
Manpur	204.8	663
Sikanderpur Karan (block headquarters)	515.5	4,548
Anup Pur	260.1	1,076
Bhainshi Koyalpur	304.4	1,394
Bhainshi Chatur	174.2	619
Sripat Pur	37.7	528
Dubey Pur	325.4	1,240
Pahar Pur Suwas	240.4	1,057
Pansari	773.7	4,471
Mahai	325.6	1,959
Rampur	92.1	469
Akbarpur	75	685
Bahuraj Mau	677.8	3,052
Kulha Bagha	670.1	3,152
Vikrampur	121.6	287
Raithana	431.7	2,538
Kathar	128.6	1,314
Ranipur	1,001	2,989
Katri Badiya Khera	128	0
Badiya Khera	868	1,453
Kharaoli	482.2	2,355
Sumraha	304.5	1,293
Kanpur	92	147
Sirsi	69.1	311
Baidra	148.3	897
Pahi	430.9	569
Vibhaora Chandan Pur	335.8	1,919
Devpur Khera	426.2	1,635
Unnao Rural	1,855.4	4,148
Seshpur Rural	234.2	2
Ibrahimabad	118.8	6
