= Sri Datta Darsanam =

- Theatrical release poster
- Directed by: Kamalakara Kameswara Rao
- Written by: Samudrala Jr. Kuppa Krishna Murthy
- Starring: Sarvadaman D. Banerjee; J. V. Ramana Murthi; Jyotirmayi; Kanchana; Ranganath
- Music by: K. V. Mahadevan
- Release date: 1985
- Country: India
- Language: Telugu

Sri Datta Darsanam is a 1985 Telugu-language biographical film directed by Kamalakara Kameswara Rao. The story is based on the life of Hindu deity Dattatreya. The story of Dattatreya was shown earlier in Sati Anasuya as a part of the Anasuya story. However this film completely picturized this Hindu religious persons life details completely, for the time in any Indian film. The film was dubbed into Hindi as Shri Datta Darshan in 1988.

== Plot ==
Atri and Anasuya meditate on the Trinity - Brahma, Vishnu and Shiva with the desire of obtaining a son who is an embodiment of the Trinity. As a result, the trinity gift themselves to the couple by taking incarnation as their son Dattatreya. Dattatreya becomes Yogiraja in course of time and sets up an ashram in Sahyadri hills along with his consort Anagha Devi. Indra having been dethroned by Jambhasura seeks refuge at Shri Datta swamy's feet on Narada maharshi's advice. Datta swamy and Anagha Devi bring peril to Jambhasura with their yogic powers. Vishnudatta, a Brahmin scholar unknowingly brings about a change in a (Brahmarakshasa) Demon's behaviours. Out of gratitude, the demon promises to take Vishnu Datta to Datta Swamy. On passing Datta Swamy's difficult test, he gets Upadesham from Datta Swamy. Kartavirya Arjuna, a prince born with defects seeks refuge at Datta Swamy's feet. On passing his divine test, Kartavirya is bestowed with great power and becomes a just ruler. But overcome by pride, he steals Maharshi Jamadagni's cow Surabhi. Bhargava Rama- Sri Vishnu incarnate, Jamadhagni Maharshi's son kills Kartaveerya. Upon hearing this news, Kartaveerya's sons and their close aides raid Jamadhagni's ashram in the absence of Bhargava Rama and behead Maharshi Jamadhagni. Bhargava Rama vows to kill all Kshatriyas(kings) with his axe (Parashu) and gains the name Parashurama. After the fulfilment of his oath he repents and seeks refuge at Shri Datta Swamy's feet. Datta Swamy shows him the path to eternal happiness.

== Cast ==
Actor / Actress	Character
Sarvadaman D. Banerjee	Sridatta
J. V. Ramana Murthi	Vishnu Datta
Jyotirmayi	Anagha devi
Kanchana	
Ramu	Kartavirya Arjuna
Prabha	Sumathi
Chalapathi Rao	Indra
Sivakrishna	Parashurama
K. R. Vijaya	Renuka
Gummadi	Jamadagni
Prabhakar Reddy	Atri
Jayanthi	Anasuya Matha
Silk Smitha	Dancer

== Soundtrack ==
- "Athivalake Aadarsam"
- "Dattatreya Stuthi"
- "Nene Satyam Nene Nityam"
- "Pracheena Slokam"
