= Hum Tere Aashiq Hain =

- Theatrical release poster
- Directed by: Prem Sagar
- Written by: Ramanand Sagar (dialogues); Sahir Ludhianvi (lyrics)
- Screenplay by: Ramanand Sagar
- Story by: K.K. Shukla
- Produced by: Prem Sagar
- Starring: Jeetendra; Hema Malini
- Cinematography: Faredoon A Irani
- Edited by: Lachhmandas
- Music by: Ravindra Jain
- Production company: Sagar Art Enterprises
- Release date: 22 November 1979
- Country: India
- Language: Hindi

Hum Tere Aashiq Hain (transl. We are your Lovers) is a 1979 Hindi-language romance film, produced and directed by Prem Sager under the Sagar Art Enterprises banner. It stars Jeetendra, Hema Malini in the pivotal roles and music composed by Ravindra Jain.

== Cast ==
- Jeetendra as Dr. Anand
- Hema Malini as Ramkali
- Amjad Khan as Thakur Shamsher Singh
- Sujit Kumar as Legal Advisor Jackson
- Om Shivpuri as Sardar Santhalu
- Shreeram Lagoo as Dr. Pradhan
- Sheetal as Lalita
- Keshto Mukherjee as Mukherjee
- Birbal as Khushiram
- Ram Sethi as Nawab Mirza Bahadur Dauliya
- Jankidas as Thakur's Munim
- Mac Mohan as Kaalia
- Shammi as Teacher

== Soundtrack ==
The film's music was composed by Ravindra Jain and the lyrics were written by Sahir Ludhiyanvi.

Song	Singer
"Naacho Re Masti Mein"	Asha Bhosle
"Hindi English Ki Pothi"	Asha Bhosle
"Jara Hanskar Kar Le Baat, Hum Tore Aashiq Hai"	Asha Bhosle, Mahendra Kapoor
"Mushkil Hai Ab Raaz Chhupana"	Asha Bhosle, Mahendra Kapoor
"Hurrey, Maar Liya Maidan, Humne Maar Liya Maidan"	Asha Bhosle, Kishore Kumar
"Manavta Ki Jeet Huyi"	Kishore Kumar
