= Sai Baba (TV series) =

- Also known as: Sai Baba – Tere Hazaron Haath
- Created by: Ramanand Sagar
- Starring: Mukul Nag
- Music by: Ravindra Jain
- Opening theme: "Sai Baba" by Suresh Wadkar
- Country of origin: India
- Original language: Hindi
- No. of seasons: 1
- No. of episodes: 212

Production
- Editor: Narinder Arora
- Camera setup: Multi-camera
- Production company: Sagar Arts/Sagar Pictures

Original release
- Network: Star Plus
- Release: 9 October 2005 – 2009

Sai Baba – Tere Hazaron Haath (English: Sai Baba – You Have Thousands of Hands) is an Indian Hindi television series that premiered on 9 October 2005 on Star Plus. The show stars Mukul Nag as Sai Baba of Shirdi.

The show was again telecast on Star Plus from 22 June 2020 during the lockdown due to coronavirus.

== Cast ==
- Mukul Nag as Sai Baba of Shirdi
- Arvind Singh Rausaria as Mhalsapat
- Anukamal as Baijaa Baai
- Jyotin Dave as Kote Patil
- Sagar Saini as Shyama
- Kumarshivam as dhondu
- Kumar Hegde as Kulkarni
- Priyanka Tiwari as Manjula
- Anukamal as Baija Maa
- Samridhii Shukla as Child
