= Poni, Unnao =

Poni
- Village
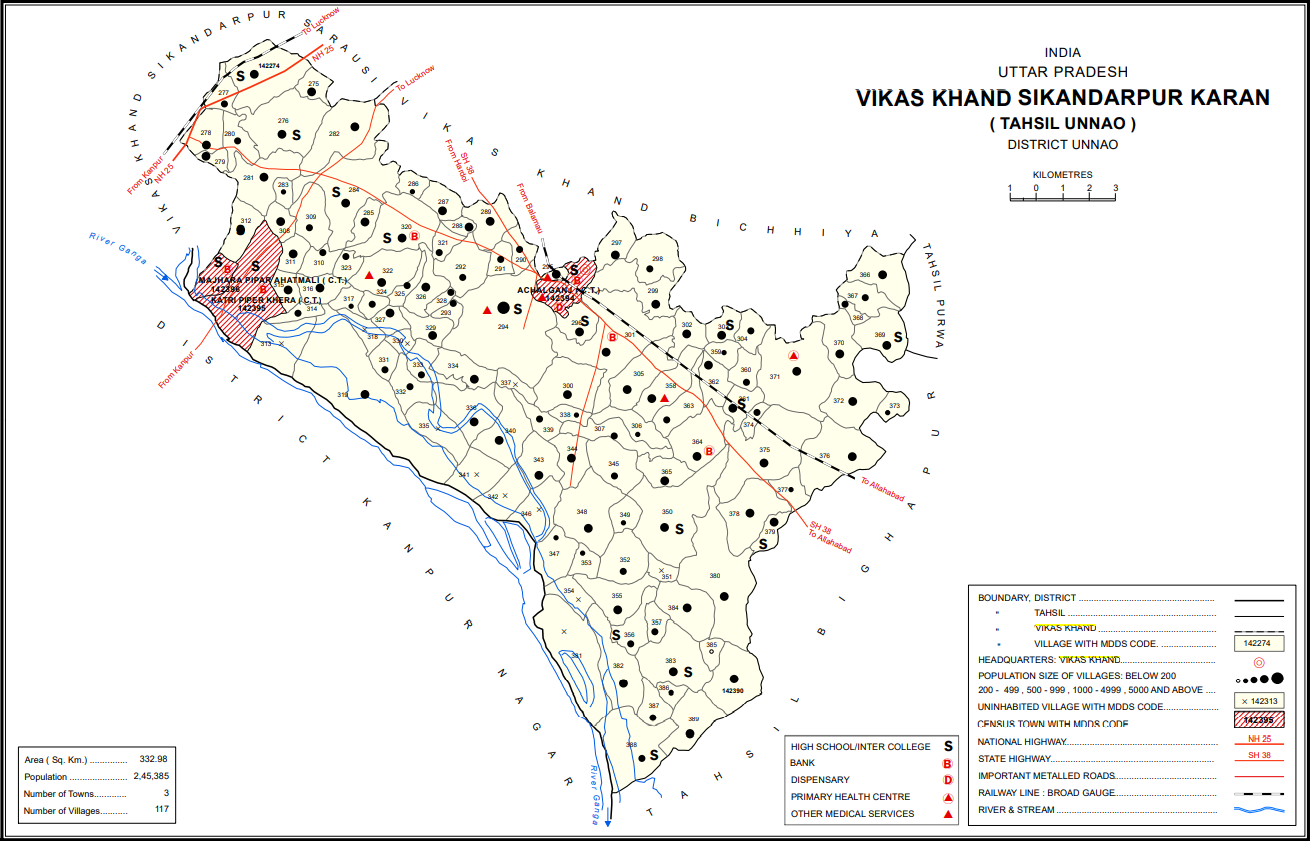
- Map showing Poni (#308) in Sikandarpur Karan CD block

- Location in Uttar Pradesh, India
- Coordinates: 26.467349°N 80.434525°E
- Country India: India
- State: Uttar Pradesh
- District: Unnao

Area
  - Total: 1.223 km^{2} (0.472 sq mi)

Population (2011)
  - Total: 1,078
  - Density: 881.4/km^{2} (2,283/sq mi)

Languages
  - Official: Hindi
- Time zone: UTC+5:30 (IST)
- Vehicle registration: UP-35

Poni is a village in Sikandarpur Karan block of Unnao district, Uttar Pradesh, India. It is connected to state highways and has 2 primary schools and no healthcare facilities. As of 2011, its population is 1,078, in 289 households.

The 1961 census recorded Poni (here spelled "Puni") as comprising 1 hamlet, with a total population of 598 (389 male and 209 female), in 96 households and 92 physical houses. The area of the village was given as 305 acres.
