= Rukhsana (film) =

1955 film by R. C. Talwar

- Directed by: R. C. Talwar
- Produced by: R. C. Talwar
- Starring: Kishore Kumar; Meena Kumari
- Music by: Sajjad Hussain
- Production company: Talwar Films
- Release date: 22 April 1955
- Country: India
- Language: Hindi

Rukhsana is a 1955 Indian Hindi-language film starring Kishore Kumar, Meena Kumari in lead roles. The film was directed by R. C. Talwar who was also its writer and producer.

== Plot ==
The film is a fantasy drama revolving a kingdom ruled by a fickle-minded king whose daughter Rukhsana falls in love with a rebel. The story progresses with an evil vizer who not only eyes the throne but also the young princess and makes her life a living hell. In the climax the two lovers overcome all the tribulations and unite again.

== Cast ==
- Meena Kumari
- Kishore Kumar
- Shammi
- Amar
- Sunder
- Kumkum
- Randhir
- Madan Puri (guest appearance)

== Crew ==
- Director – R. C. Talwar
- Producer – R. C. Talwar
- Story – R.C. Talwar
- Cinematography – Prakash Malhotra
- Art Director – Kanu Desai
- Music – Sajjad Hussain
- Lyrics – Shakeel Badayuni, Tanveer Naqvi, Khumar Barabankvi
- Playback Singers – Mubarak Begum, Lata Mangeshkar, Asha Bhosle, Kishore Kumar

== Soundtrack ==
The film had five songs in it. The music of the film was composed by Sajjad Hussain. Shakeel Badayuni, Tanveer Naqvi and Khumar Barabankvi penned down the lyrics.

| Song | Singer |
|---|---|
| "Tere Jahan Se Chal Diye Dete Hue Duaen Hum" (Duet) | Kishore Kumar, Asha Bhosle |
| "Ye Char Din Bahar Ke, Hansi Khushi Guzarke" | Kishore Kumar, Asha Bhosle |
| "Tera Dard Dil Mein Basa Liya" | Lata Mangeshkar |
| "Tumhe Hum Yaad Karte Hai" | Asha Bhosle |
| "Din Raat Jafaye Karte Hai" | Asha Bhosle |
| "Tere Jahan Se Chal Diye" | Asha Bhosle |
| "Dil Ko Lagake Huzoor Hum To Hue Majboor" | Asha Bhosle, Mubarak Begum |
| "Husnwalon Se Kabhi Ankh" | Mubarak Begum |

== Reception ==
The film opened to negative reviews with the critics criticising the stereotypical script. However the lead actors Meena Kumari and Kishore Kumar were praised for their respective performances.
