= Sajjad Hussain (composer) =

Music composer from India (1917-1995)

- Born: 15 June 1917; Sitamau, Central India Agency (present-day Madhya Pradesh, India)
- Died: 21 July 1995 (aged 78); Mahim, Mumbai, India
- Occupation: Film music director
- Years active: 1944 – 1977

Sajjad Hussain (15 June 1917 – 21 July 1995) was an Indian film score composer. He was also an accomplished mandolinist, playing the mandolin as a "Top Grade" player for the Indian film industry in Mumbai for more than five decades, reputed to have played more than 22,000 songs, including title-songs and background music. Besides the music for movies, he was known to play Indian classical music (Hindustani), as well as Arabic music and Sufi music.

== Biography ==
Sajjad Hussain was born in 1917 in Sitamau, which was at that time, a village in the then Central India Agency, now part of Madhya Pradesh, India . As a child, he was taught sitar by his father Mohammed Amir Khan. He learned the veena, violin, flute and piano during his teenage years. He was also an accomplished mandolin player, and could play Indian classical music on the instrument.

In 1937, Sajjad Hussain decided to try his luck as a film score composer, and came to Bombay with his elder brother Nisar Hussain. His first job was at Sohrab Modi's Minerva Movietone at Rs. 30 a month salary. He later moved to the Wadia Movietone, working at Rs. 60 a month. During the next few years, he worked as an assistant to music composer Meer Saheb and Rafiq Ghaznavi, and as a contract instrument player for Shaukat Hussain Rizvi.

In 1940, Sajjad was introduced to the composer Mir Allah Baksh (father of actress Meena Kumari) by a friend. Impressed with Sajjad's mandolin skills, Ali employed him as an assistant.

Sometime later, Sajjad became an assistant to the music director Hanuman Prasad. In this capacity, he composed two songs for the film Gaali (1944): Aag Lage Saavan Mein and Ab Aaja Dil Na Lage (both sung by Nirmala Devi). The songs of Dost (1944), his first film as an independent music director, were big hits. These songs included the three songs sung by Noor Jehan: Koi Prem Ka Deke Sandesa, Alam Par Alam Aur Sitam Par Sitam and Badnaam Mohabbat Kaun Kare. But when the film producer Shaukat Hussain Rizvi gave the entire credit to his wife Noor Jehan for the success of the songs, Sajjad Hussain vowed never to work with Noor Jehan again.

Sajjad went on to work with many notable singers, including Suraiya, Lata Mangeshkar, Asha Bhosle. He was regarded highly by his contemporaries, including Anil Biswas. One of the best scores that Sajjad Hussain created was in the film Rustam Sohrab (1963) in which Suraiyya sang 'Ye kaisi ajab dastan ho gayi hai'. Lata Mangeshkar's one of the most favourite songs 'Ae dilruba' and 'Phir tumhari yaad aayi ae sanam' by Mohammed Rafi, Manna Dey and Sadat Khan were appreciated. In a 2012 interview, Lata Mangeshkar named him as her favourite composer. His music compositions rank among the most complex scores of Hindi film songs.

=== Contentious personality ===
Sajjad Hussain was known for his contentious personality. He often landed in controversies due to his short temper, outspokenness, moody behaviour and perfectionist nature. When Shaukat Hussain Rizvi gave the credit for the musical success of Dost (1944) to his wife and singer Noor Jehan, Sajjad vowed never to compose a song for Noor Jehan. He had conflicts with the lyricist D. N. Madhok during recording of film Saiyyan (1951), and with actor Dilip Kumar during the recording of film Sangdil (1952). He made disapproving remarks on Lata Mangeshkar's singing, leading to differences between the two for a short period. He called Talat Mahmood "Galat Mehmood" (Wrong Mehmood) and Kishore Kumar "Shor Kumar" (Noisy Kumar), and also criticised Naushad's music. He rejected an offer by Shashadhar Mukherjee of Filmistan, and lost the opportunity to compose music for film Mughal-e-Azam (1960) due to differences with film producer-director K. Asif. Once, heavily impressed by Sajjad Hussain's Yeh hawa yeh raat yeh chandni (film Sangdil), the composer Madan Mohan created Tujhe kya sunaun mein dilruba, tere saamne mera haal hai (film: Aakhri Dao) on the same metre. At a concert when Madan Mohan walked past Sajjad, the hot-tempered Sajjad taunted "Aaj kal toh parchaiyyan bhi ghoomne phirne lagi hain" ("Even shadows are moving around now"). Madan Mohan replied that he could not find any better music director to copy. This reply made Sajjad Hussain speechless.

His attitude made him an avoidable character and people from the industry started ignoring him. As a result of his controversial behaviour, Sajjad got less than 20 film score assignments in his 34-year-long music career. However, one notable milestone in his career as music director is the songs he composed for Sri Lankan Sinhala film "Daiwa yogaya-1959". Daiwa Yogaya was filmed in Prasad Studios in Pune and was a box office hit in Sri Lanka mainly owing to the songs he composed. The songs "Hada Gile Ama Mihire" and "Doi Doiya putha" sung by Rukmani Devi, the most popular Actress/Singer of Ceylon in that era are still popular. His last film as a composer was Aakhri Sajda (1977), although he participated in concerts till the 1980s.

Lata Mangeshkar was once asked in an interview about music directors that she had found difficult to please. She replied that in the beginning of her career, there were difficulties with everyone because she was still learning and was new in the field. But she was always apprehensive with Sajjad Hussain because he was so particular. Sajjad Hussain never liked loud singing. He always insisted that all the musical instruments were perfectly tuned. He never compromised on that. She added that even many years after the first recording, Sajjad Hussain's songs sound effortless and are not painful to hear.

== Death and legacy ==
Sajjad Hussain lived in the Natalwala Building at Mahim, Mumbai, India in the last years of his life. He had five sons and one daughter. All five of his sons (Mustafa, Yusuf, Noor Mohammad, Nasir Ahmmad and Abdul Karim) went on to become musicians. Sajjad Hussain died on 21 July 1995 in oblivion: Khayyam and Pankaj Udhas were the only notable film personalities to attend his funeral.

Sajjad Hussain is considered in India to have had a strong understanding of film song lyrics, instrumentation, classical music and the voice quality of his singers. He had learned and mastered numerous instruments, namely violin, veena, jaltarang, flute, piano, banjo, accordion, Hawaiian and Spanish guitar, sitar, clarinet, harp and mandolin. Veteran music director Naushad is quoted as saying, "He (Sajjad Hussain) was an extremely talented man, very knowledgeable about music, but his temperament was his undoing."

Another highly respected music director Anil Biswas once observed, "By all standards Sajjad Hussain was an original, a genius music director, different from all others and each of his musical composition carried most difficult notations, which he himself used to create and took utmost pleasure out of it."

== Filmography ==
- Gaali (1944)
- Dost (1944)
- Dharam (1945)
- 1857 (1946)
- Tilasmi Duniya (1946)
- Kasam (1947)
- Mere Bhagwan (1947)
- Rooplekha (1949)
- Khel (1950)
- Magroor (1950)
- Saiyyan (1951)
- Hulchul (1951)
- Sangdil (1952)
- Rukhsana (1955)
- Rustam Sohrab (1963)
- Mera Shikaar (1973)
- Aakhri Sajda (1977)

A nearly 15-minute mandolin composition by Sajjad was used in the Telugu movie Muthyala Muggu (1975). In addition, he was the Music Director for Sinhala film "Daiwa yogaya" which was a box office hit in Sri Lanka in 1959, which was partly credited to its songs.
