= Sirivennela =

- Film poster
- Directed by: K. Viswanath
- Written by: K. Viswanath; Sainath Thotapalli (dialogues)
- Produced by: Ch. Ramakrishna Reddy; N. Bhaskara Reddy; Ujjuri Chinaveerraju
- Starring: Suhasini; Sarvadaman Banerjee; Moon Moon Sen
- Cinematography: M. V. Raghu
- Edited by: G. G. Krishna Rao
- Music by: K. V. Mahadevan
- Production company: Geetha Krishna Movie Combines
- Release date: 5 June 1986
- Running time: 181 minutes
- Country: India
- Language: Telugu

Sirivennela (Note: Spelt as Siri Vennela on the CBFC certificate.) (transl. Moonlight) is a 1986 Indian Telugu-language romance film written and directed by K. Viswanath. The film stars Suhasini, Sarvadaman Banerjee and Moon Moon Sen. The music was composed by K. V. Mahadevan.

The film won five Nandi Awards. It was screened at the Asia Pacific Film Festival, the International Film Festival of India, the Moscow Film Festival and the AISFM Film Festival. Shot in Jaipur and Kerala, the film has Hariprasad Chaurasia's flute rendering and a cameo by drummer Sivamani. The film was dubbed in Tamil as Raaga Devathai. Lyricist Seetharama Sastry derived his stage name Sirivennela from this film.

== Plot ==
Hari Prasad is a visually impaired, self-taught flutist who resides with his younger sister, Samyuktha, in a scenic, tourist-oriented village near Jaipur. Despite lacking formal training in classical music, he possesses an innate ability to play melodies that captivate listeners. He earns a modest living by performing for visiting tourists. One day, Jyothirmai, a local tour guide, encounters Hari Prasad and recognizes his extraordinary raw talent. She introduces him to the nuances of nature and classical frameworks, mentoring him until he achieves national acclaim as a maestro, earning the title of Pandit Hari Prasad. Over the years, Hari Prasad develops a deep, unspoken admiration for Jyothirmai, secretly dedicating all of his musical albums to her. Concurrently, Subhashini, a mute painter, becomes deeply enamored with Hari Prasad and communicates her unrequited feelings through her artwork.

Recognizing his sister's silent devotion, Subhashini's brother approaches Hari Prasad's uncle with a formal marriage proposal. However, the proposal is halted when Hari Prasad publicly confesses his singular devotion to Jyothirmai. This revelation deeply conflicts Jyothirmai, who had previously worked as a high-class escort for wealthy tourists to survive. Overwhelmed by Hari Prasad's unconditional love and his complete disregard for societal judgments regarding her history, she nevertheless feels that her past would permanently tarnish his public reputation and spiritual purity. To protect him, she fabricates a story, claiming she is already engaged to a physician and therefore cannot accept his proposal. Prioritizing her happiness, a resilient Hari Prasad accepts her decision and takes it upon himself to personally arrange her wedding festivities.

On the day of the scheduled wedding, overwhelmed by her internal conflict and grief, Jyothirmai commits suicide. In her final letter, she requests that her eyes be legally donated to Hari Prasad upon her death. She further desires that her funeral procession be elaborately staged to resemble a joyous bridal procession, explicitly stipulating that her demise must be kept a secret from Hari Prasad so as not to ruin his perception of her happiness.

The villagers and family members comply with her final wishes, acting as though they are bidding farewell to a bride departing for her matrimonial home. Throughout the simulated celebration, Hari Prasad maintains a calm, stoic demeanor. Once the procession concludes, he walks directly to the graveyard to pay his final respects at Jyothirmai's resting place. When a shocked Samyuktha questions how he discovered the truth, Hari Prasad explains that his deep spiritual and auditory connection to Jyothirmai made it impossible to conceal her death from him. The film concludes with Hari Prasad and Subhashini standing together in the graveyard, mourning their shared loss in a poignant, silent solidarity.

== Cast ==
- Suhasini as Subhashini
- Sarvadaman Banerjee as Pandit Hari Prasad
- Moon Moon Sen as Jyotirmayi
- Subhalekha Sudhakar as Tour Guide Sooribabu
- J. V. Ramana Murthi as Recording Company Owner
- Sakshi Ranga Rao as Music Teacher
- Misro as Ramalingaiah, village elder and grandfather figure
- Girish Pradhan as Girish
- Eashwara Rao
- Jit Mohan Mitra
- Nithya as Samyuktha, Hari's sister
- Shubha
- Varalakshmi
- Padma
- Baby Meena as Renu
- Sivamani in a cameo appearance as a drummer

== Soundtrack ==
Sirivennela abounds in classical music composed by K. V. Mahadevan with flute renditions by the renowned flautist Hariprasad Chaurasia. All songs were written by Seetharama Sastry. After the success of the soundtrack, he became popularly known as "Sirivennela" Seetharama Sastry. The music was released through Lahari music label.

Track list
No.	Title	Singer(s)	Length
1.	"Vidhaatha Thalapuna"	S. P. Balasubrahmanyam, P. Susheela	6:53
2.	"Paatalo Paadalenidi"	N. S. Prakash Rao, P. Susheela	5:18
3.	"Chandamaama Raave"	S. P. Balasubrahmanyam, P. Susheela, B. Vasantha	4:39
4.	"Merise Thaaraladheroopam"	S. P. Balasubrahmanyam	3:37
5.	"Polimera Daatipothunnaa"	S. P. Balasubrahmanyam, B. Vasantha	1:20
6.	"Aadhi Bhikshuvu"	S. P. Balasubrahmanyam	4:11
7.	"Ee Gaali Ee Nela"	S. P. Balasubrahmanyam, P. Susheela	6:49
8.	"Prakruthi Kaanthaku"	S. P. Balasubrahmanyam	3:39
9.	"Chinuku Chinuku"	S. P. Balasubrahmanyam	1:55
10.	"Flute Music"	Hariprasad Chaurasia	4:07
Total length:			42:28

== Awards ==
Year	Nominee / work	Award	Result
Nandi Awards 1986	Sirivennela Sitaramasastri (for "Vidatha Talapuna")	Best Lyricist	Won
Nandi Awards 1986	S. P. Balasubrahmanyam (for "Vidatha Talapuna")	Best Male Playback Singer	Won
Nandi Awards 1986	Moon Moon Sen	Best Supporting Actress	Won
Nandi Awards 1986	Pandurangan	Best Audiographer	Won
Nandi Awards 1986	M. V. Raghu	Special Jury Award	Won
