= Naya Kanoon =

- Directed by: R. C. Talwar
- Written by: Mukhram Sharma
- Produced by: Girdharilal Manchanda
- Starring: Ashok Kumar; Bharat Bhushan; Vyjayanthimala
- Cinematography: M. N. Malhotra
- Edited by: S. Ranvir
- Music by: Madan Mohan
- Production company: Mehboob Studios
- Distributed by: Manchanda Production
- Release date: 1 January 1965
- Running time: 148 minutes
- Country: India
- Language: Hindi

Naya Kanoon (transl. New Legislation) is a 1965 Indian Hindi-language film, written and directed by R. C. Talwar. The film stars Ashok Kumar, Bharat Bhushan and Vyjayanthimala in the lead with Om Prakash, Badri Prasad, Leela Mishra, Kamal Mehra, Purnima and Nishi appearing in other significant roles.

The film deals with the law and the justice with a family backdrop. The story revolves around Jyoti's (Vyjayanthimala) relationship with her brother, Shekhar (Ashok Kumar) and husband, Deepak (Bharat Bhushan).

== Plot ==
Deepak (Bharat Bhushan) lives as a tenant in a small room, owned by his landlord Om Prakash Munshi (Om Prakash). Although he is a poet, he is unable to secure any employment. One day, he meets with Jyoti (Vyjayanthimala) and both fall in love. After their marriage, there is considerable resentment, and Jyoti's brother, Shekar (Ashok Kumar) refuses to have to do anything with Jyoti. When Shekar offers money to Deepak, Deepak refuses to accept it. Shekar and Jyoti's dad, Daya Shankar (Badri Prasad) sympathises with Jyoti and wants her to be the sole heir to his property after his death. In the meantime, Om Prakash marries his son to a wealthy woman, who does bring in a lot of dowry, but refuses to do any household work, and instead puts her father-in-law to work. As Deepak is unable to get employment, Jyoti is successful in getting employment as a singer on the local radio station, not knowing that Deepak is resentful of her success, and is thinking of separating from her.

== Cast ==
- Ashok Kumar as Shekhar
- Bharat Bhushan as Deepak
- Vyjayanthimala as Jyoti
- Om Prakash as Om Prakash Munshi
- Badri Prasad as Dayashankar
- Leela Mishra as Maid
- Nishi
- Purnima as Geeta

== Soundtrack ==
Naya Kanoon

Soundtrack album by Madan Mohan
- Released: 31 December 1964
- Recorded: Minoo Katrak
- Genre: Feature film soundtrack
- Label: His Master's Voice
- Producer: Madan Mohan

Madan Mohan chronology
| 'Neela Aakash' (1965) | Naya Kanoon (1965) | 'Bombay Race Course' (1965) |

The film's soundtrack was composed by Madan Mohan in 1964. The playback voices were lent by Asha Bhosle and Mohammed Rafi.

All lyrics written by Hasrat Jaipuri, except where noted.

| Song | Singer |
|---|---|
| "Shama Mein Taqat Kahan" | Mohammed Rafi |
| "Jo Dekhta Hai Kehta Hai" | Mohammed Rafi |
| "Unhe Qissa-E-Gham Jo" | Mohammed Rafi |
| "Lijiye Dil Ka Nazrana, Lijiye Aankh Ka Shukrana" | Mohammed Rafi, Asha Bhosle |
| "Unhe Qissa-E-Gham Jo" | Asha Bhosle |
| "Aankh Mein Rehte Hai Woh" | Asha Bhosle |
| "Meri Rakhi Ki Rakhiyo" | Asha Bhosle |
| "Mere Rasiya" | Asha Bhosle |

- The Rakhi song of this film lyrics by Saraswati Kumar Deepak.
