= Saas Bhi Kabhi Bahu Thi =

1970 film directed by V. Madhusudhana Rao

- Poster
- Directed by: V. Madhusudan Rao
- Written by: Rajendra Krishan; N.S. Bedi
- Story by: Barampuram Kollady
- Produced by: C.S. Kumar; Vasu Menon
- Starring: Sanjay Khan; Leena Chandavarkar; Om Prakash; Shashikala; Lalita Pawar; Jagdeep
- Music by: R. D. Burman
- Release date: 1 January 1971
- Country: India
- Language: Hindi

Saas Bhi Kabhi Bahu Thi (transl. A mother-in-law was once a daughter-in-law, too) is a 1971 Indian Hindi film starring Sanjay Khan, Leena Chandavarkar, Om Prakash, Jagdeep among others. It deals with the relationship between mothers-in-law and their daughters-in-law. The film was a remake of the Telugu film Atha Okinti Kodale.

== Plot ==
Pretty Sadhana, the daughter of Rangpur based widow, Bhagmati, falls in love, and marries Haripur-based Dilip Chaudhary, who lives with his father Motilal; and mother Maya. It is here that she will find out her mom expects her to abuse Maya, and drive her out; while Bhagmati herself abuses her very own daughter-in-law, Lajwanti, for not bringing any dowry, and prevents her submissive son, Kanhaiya, from being intimate with her. Sadhana will also find out why Motilal and Maya do not converse with each other directly, and why the former keeps a photo-less frame in the main living room of their mansion.

== Cast ==
- Sanjay Khan as Dilip Chaudhary "Deepu"
- Leena Chandavarkar as Sadhana Chaudhary
- Om Prakash as Motilal Chaudhary
- Shashikala as Maya Chaudhary
- Jagdeep as Kanhaiya
- Anupama as Lajwanti "Laajo"
- Lalita Pawar as Bhagmati
- Manmohan Krishna as Chamanlal
- Pratima Devi as Laxmi Chaudhary
- N. S. Bedi as Sevakram
- Sunder as Govind

== Soundtrack ==
The soundtrack was composed by R. D. Burman.

Song	Singer
"Dukh Sukh Mere"	Lata Mangeshkar
"Suno Ji Tum Bade Woh Ho"	Kishore Kumar, Suman Kalyanpur
"Le Lo Chudiyaan Neeli Peeli Lal Rang Aasmani"	Kishore Kumar, Lata Mangeshkar
"Ram Kahe Mai Itni Jawan Ho Gayi"	Usha Mangeshkar, Asha Bhosle
"Khol Ke Aankhen Chalo"	Mohammed Rafi
"Ek Botal Ho Bagal Mein Aur Hath Mein Ho Ek Jaam"	Kishore Kumar, Asha Bhosle
"Suno Re Sadhu"	Manna Dey
