= Maharamau =

Coordinates: 27°26′N 81°48′E

- Village
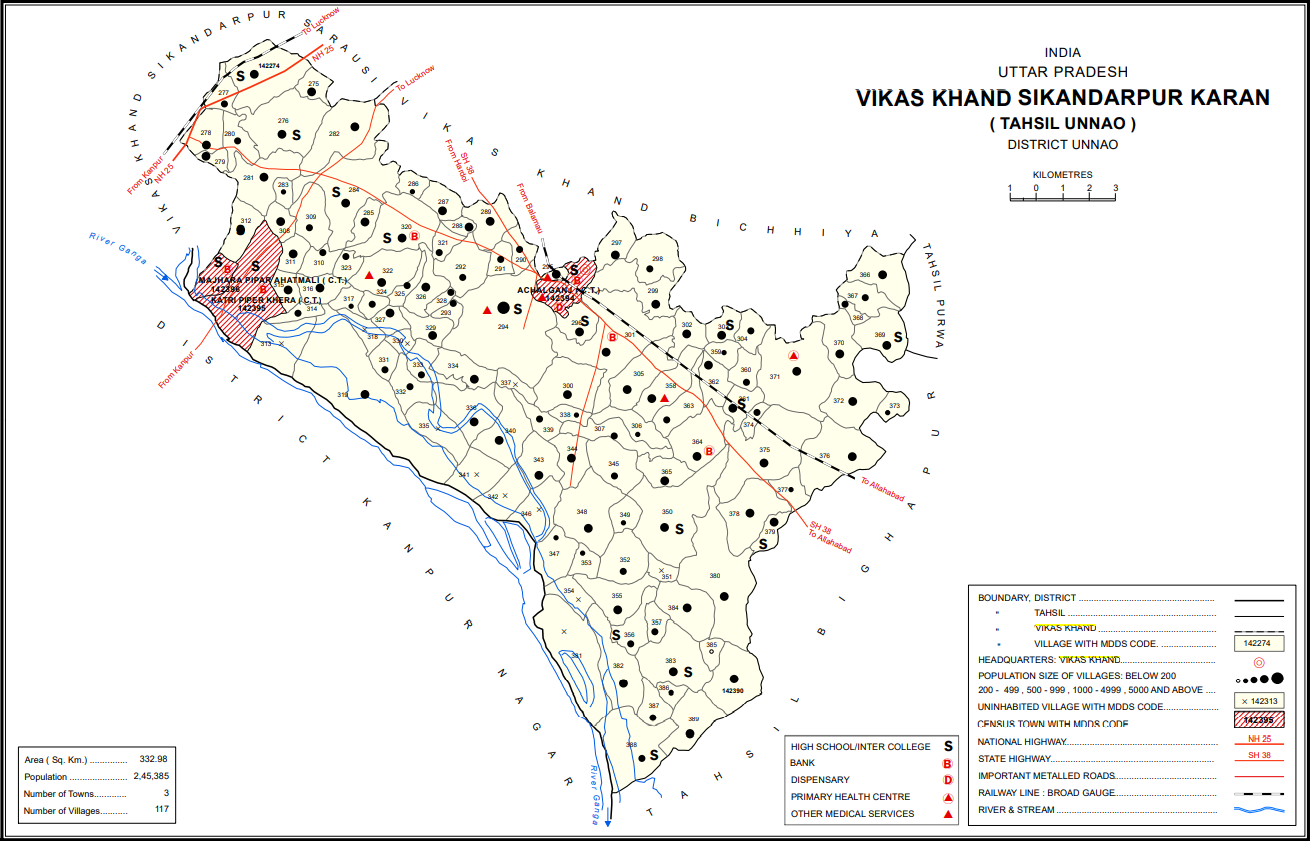
- Map of Maharamau

- Location in Uttar Pradesh, India
- Country: India
- State: Uttar Pradesh
- District: Unnao

Area
  - Total: 1.72 km^{2} (0.66 sq mi)

Population (2011)
  - Total: 550
  - Density: 320/km^{2} (830/sq mi)

Languages
  - Official Language: Hindi
- Time zone: UTC+5:30 (IST)
- Vehicle registration: UP-35

Maharamau (also pronounced Mahra Mau) is a small village in the Sikandarpur Karan block of Unnao district, Uttar Pradesh, India. As of 2011, its population was 550 in 106 households. It has one primary school and no healthcare facilities.

Maharamau is known for its street dance programs that engage the whole village. Agriculture is the main income source of the village. The major problems that the locals face usually involve electrification, transportation, and water facilities.

== Location ==
The nearest railway stations to Maharamau are Bighapur and Rawat Pur Tikauli, and the village can be reached by car from Unnao. Visitors can take a shared auto to Sikanderpur 'Karan', which is about 11.2 km (7.0 mi) away. The distance between Maharamau and Kanpur Central railway station is approximately 78 km (48 mi), and Lucknow Airport is 100 km (62 mi) away. It has a post office at Nibai and a police station at Bighapur. The village is on the Ganga Katari River. The postal code of the Maharamau village is 209827.

== Education ==
The village has two schools and one college. One school is administered by the Government of Uttar Pradesh, and the other, Shree Gangotri Adarsh Inter College, is private. This village is the main education centre of the Katari area. P S Ambedkar Nagar School was established in 2012, consisting of 1st to 5th grade. It is directly managed by the Ministry of Education.

== Population ==
This village has had a total population of 550 in 2011.
