= Aakhri Sajda =

- Poster
- Directed by: Sageer Mukhtar
- Music by: Sajjad Hussain
- Distributed by: Bombay Talkies
- Release date: 1977
- Country: India
- Language: Hindi

Aakhri Sajda (transl. The last sajdah) is a 1977 Bollywood drama film directed by Sageer Mukhtar. This is the last film of music director Sajjad Hussain.

== Plot ==
Jennie, the atheist foreign wife of Akbar, son of pious and honest institutional head, finds life in her in-laws house stifling and agrees to participate in a dance program much against their protestations. A paralytic stroke makes her turn towards reading the Koran, which miraculously cures her of her ailment. She decides to devote the rest of her life in prayers.

== Cast ==
- Mala Sinha
- Murad
- Helen
- Jagdeep

== Music ==
1. "Nighaah-e-shauq Se" – Mohammed Rafi
2. "Bula Lo Dar Pe Habibe-khuda" – Mohammed Rafi
3. "Kisi Se Mili Hai Nazar" – Usha Mangeshkar
4. "Nazar Milao Pata Chale" – Usha Mangeshkar
