= Hamrahi (1974 film) =

- DVD cover
- Directed by: Anand Sagar
- Written by: Krishan Chander; Moti Sagar
- Produced by: Subhash Sagar
- Starring: Randhir Kapoor; Tanuja
- Cinematography: Prem Sager
- Edited by: Lachmandass
- Music by: Kalyanji Anandji
- Production company: Sagar Art Corporation
- Release date: 26 April 1974
- Country: India
- Language: Hindi

Hamrahi is a 1974 Bollywood drama film directed by Anand Sagar and produced by Subhash Sagar.

== Cast ==
- Randhir Kapoor as Ramesh
- Tanuja as Shalini 'Shalu'
- Gajanan Jagirdar
- K. N. Singh
- Sujit Kumar
- Lalita Pawar
- Keshto Mukherjee
- Gurcharan Pohli
- Rajendra Nath
- Pinchoo Kapoor
- Tun Tun
- Shakeela Bano Bhopali as Qawaal Singer
- Hiralal

== Music ==
Song	Singer
"Chup Chup Kyun Baithi Ho"	Mohammed Rafi
"Mohabbatbhara Koi Paigham De"	Manna Dey, Mahendra Kapoor
"Mehfil Mein Husn Mera"	Asha Bhosle
"Saiyan Ne Baiyan Pakadke"	Asha Bhosle
