= Ek Dil Sau Afsane =

Ek Dil Sao Afsane
- Poster of Ek Dil Sao Afsane
- Directed by: R. C. Talwar
- Starring: Raj Kapoor; Waheeda Rehman; Lalita Pawar; Sulochana Chatterjee; Mridula Rani; Mehar Banu; Jagdish Raj
- Music by: Shankar–Jaikishan
- Distributed by: Talwar Films
- Release date: 1963
- Country: India
- Language: Hindi

Ek Dil Sao Afsane is a 1963 Hindi romantic film, directed by R. C. Talwar with Raj Kapoor and Waheeda Rehman in the lead roles.

== Plot ==
Shekhar's (Raj Kapoor) maternal grandmother Nani (Lalita Pawar) is a very loving person, and loves Shekhar dearly as a mother. She is also very religious and firm in her beliefs. She believes that every man must have a male heir to carry on the family's name. Therefore, she will only permit Shekhar to marry a woman who will bear him a son. Shekhar presents his Nani with Sunita (Waheeda Rehman), the girl he plans to marry. Nani finds out that Sunita cannot bear any children and disapproves of her. Shekar and Sunita marry anyway, and to pacify Nani, pretend that a friend's son is theirs.

== Trivia ==
All the songs picturized on Raj Kapoor were sung by Mukesh, whom Kapoor used as his singing voice, Except in one Song (Tum Hi Tum ho). It happened one day that Mukesh was unavailable for a song recording, So Mohammed Rafi was called for a dubbing version of the song. Kapoor was so impressed that he used this dubbed song of Mohammed Rafi in the Film. After hearing the song, Mukesh too quoted that the way Mohammed Rafi has sung, he couldn't have rendered in that beautiful and melodious way.

The original female lead was Madhubala. Shooting had started with her in 1959, but her heart ailment curtailed her career and she left the film incomplete. Her portions were entirely reshot with Waheeda Rehman replacing her.

== Cast ==
Artist	Character Name
Raj Kapoor	Shekhar
Waheeda Rehman	Sunita
Lalita Pawar	Shekhar's Grandmother
Sulochana Chatterjee	Neelu's Mother
Jagdish Raj	Sunita's Boss
Merlyn	Munna

== Music ==
The Music of the film was composed by the popular duo Shankar–Jaikishan. The music is still remembered for songs such as "Kuch Sher Sunata Hoon", Sunoji Suno and many more. All songs were sung by singer Mukesh only one song named "Tum Hi Tum Hi Mere Jeevan Mein" was rendered by Mohammed Rafi. Other singer who contributed to the album was Lata Mangeshkar who sang four song beautifully.

Song	Artists
"Sunoji Suno Hamari Bhi Suno"	Mukesh
"Kuchh Sher Sunata Hoon Main"	Mukesh
"Mast Nazar Dekh Idhar"	Mukesh
"Tum Hi Tum Ho" (Duet)	Mohammed Rafi, Lata Mangeshkar
"Ek Dil Aur Sau Afsane"	Lata Mangeshkar
"O Jadugar Pyar Ke Ye Bata"	Lata Mangeshkar
"Door Ke O Chanda Aa Meri Bahon Men"	Lata Mangeshkar
