= Charas (1976 film) =

- Directed by: Ramanand Sagar
- Written by: Ved Rahi; Ramanand Sagar
- Produced by: Ramanand Sagar
- Starring: Dharmendra; Hema Malini; Ajit; Amjad Khan; Sujit Kumar
- Cinematography: Prem Sager
- Edited by: Lachhmandas
- Music by: Laxmikant–Pyarelal
- Production companies: Jyoti Studios; Natraj Studios
- Distributed by: Sagar Art International
- Release date: 24 May 1976
- Country: India
- Language: Hindi

Charas (transl. Hashish) is a 1976 Indian Hindi-language action thriller film produced and directed by Ramanand Sagar. It is set against the backdrop of the expulsion of Indian community from Uganda by its dictator Idi Amin in 1972. The film stars Dharmendra, Hema Malini, Ajit, Amjad Khan, Sujit Kumar, Aruna Irani, Asrani, Keshto Mukherjee and Tom Alter in lead roles. The film's music is by Laxmikant–Pyarelal.

== Cast ==
- Dharmendra as Suraj Kumar
- Hema Malini as Sudha
- Ajit as Kalicharan
- Amjad Khan as Robert
- Aruna Irani as Nimmu
- Nazir Hussain as Seth Vrindavan
- Manmohan Krishna as Sudha's Father
- Asrani as Police Inspector Rustom
- Keshto Mukherjee as Police Inspector Golmes
- Sujit Kumar as Lawrence / Shaikh Abdul Sattar
- Paidi Jairaj as Police Officer Hameed (as P. Jairaj)
- D.K. Sapru as Watson (as Sapru)
- Sajjan as Jango
- Viju Khote as No 10, Henchman of Kalicharan
- Sailesh Kumar
- Madhumati as Laila
- Agha as Head Police Constable, special appearance
- Sunder as Police Constable Pandu, special appearance

== Plot ==
Vijay Ramniklal was a NRI living in Uganda with his son Suraj and daughter Radha. They are planning to move back to India because of the civil war in the country. The night they were about to move, their home is attacked by rebels and set on fire. Suraj jumps in the fire to save his sister. He carries a woman out, but she turns out to be the housemaid in his sister's clothes (Radha asked the maid to choose the clothes she liked before she left and the maid asked her for the clothes she was wearing). Suraj's father dies from the trauma of losing his daughter. Suraj too believes that Radha burned with the house, but when no body is found he feels that there is something fishy. Nevertheless, he leaves for India alone as the country is embroiled in civil war.

Upon reaching India Suraj realises that the caretaker of their property Kalicharan, has sold most of it and is not willing to return it while using it for illegal purposes. Kalicharan tries to kill Suraj who, while escaping from his enemies, hides in the car of Sudha. After a gruesome car chase, the goons of Kalicharan are chased off by an unknown man. The person claims to be a rival mafia don to Kalicharan and invites Suraj to join his gang in order to regain his ancestral property and find his sister Radha. Suraj declines, saying he would rather suffer all his life than to become a criminal. Sudha takes him to his home and he contacts the police. It is revealed that the person who claimed to be a mafia don was actually a police officer. Suraj is invited by DIG Police to join them in combating Kalicharan's international drug racket.

Sudha, a renowned dancer and stage performer, has a shady past. She is blackmailed by Kalicharan who frames her as a murder suspect. He uses her to smuggle drugs.

Suraj's mission takes him to Rome and then Malta where he again bumps into Sudha. His sister is in the same island, held captive by human traffickers associated with Kalicharan. Suraj rescues her when they try to capture him using her as bait. With the help of local police, Suraj and Indian narcotics division is able to get hold of most of Kalicharan's men, but he holds Sudha as a hostage in his Bond villain style underground lair. Now it all lies in Suraj's hands to save Sudha and book Kalicharan.

== Soundtrack ==
The soundtrack of the film is composed by the duo of Laxmikant–Pyarelal and the lyrics were written by the veteran lyricist Anand Bakshi.

=== Track listing ===
Song	Singer
"Kal Ki Haseen Mulaqat Ke Liye"	Kishore Kumar, Lata Mangeshkar
"Aaja Teri Yaad Aayi"	Lata Mangeshkar, Mohammad Rafi, Anand Bakshi
"Raja Na Ja Dil Todke"	Lata Mangeshkar
"Mera Naam Ballerina"	Asha Bhosle
"Main Ek Shareef Ladki Badnaam Ho Gayi"	Lata Mangeshkar
"Charas Charas"	Asha Bhosle, Mahendra Kapoor
