= Mukul Nag =

Indian actor

- Born: 25 October 1961 (age 64); Meerut, Uttar Pradesh, India
- Education: National School of Drama
- Occupation: Actor
- Years active: 1993 – present
- Known for: Sai Baba of Shirdi in Sai Baba; Sudama in Shri Krishna
- Spouse: Indira Nag

Mukul Nag is an Indian actor. He is best known for playing the revered saint, Sai Baba of Shirdi, in the Hindi language historical drama series Sai Baba (TV series). The series was produced by Sagar Films and broadcast by Star Plus in 2008.

== Early life ==
In an interview with Sai Leela Times, Mukul Nag said: "Papaji (Ramanand Sagar) asked me just one question before he cast me as Sai Baba in the serial. He asked me how you're planning to do this role? I replied I do my job with full Devotion (shraddha), and he said you're doing this role – I just want to know this."

Mukul Nag is one of the best actors of National School of Drama, India. He was born on 25 October in a small city of India. His first play, Taimoor or Balak, was directed and acted by himself at the time when he was just 12 years old. After finishing his studies, he started his course with National School of Drama. He then acted with Sagar Films in Shri Krishna as Sudama and Ashvatthama.

Mukul Nag has his own production house named Amita Nag Production.

He also played the role of Prabal Gupta in the episode Sahi ka Kanta for Byomkesh Bakshi (TV series) broadcast by Doordarshan in 1997.

== Filmography ==
=== Films ===
- Hazaar Chaurasi Ki Maa (1998)
- Mast (1999) as Blacker
- Company (2002) as Insp. Navlekar
- Bhagat Singh (2002) as Chandrashekhar Azad
- Gangajal (2003)
- Satta (2003)
- Apaharan (2005) as Usman
- Phantom (2015)

=== Television ===
Year	Serial	Role	Channel	Notes	Ref.
1993-2000	Shri Krishna	Sudama / Ashwatthama	DD National		
1997	Byomkesh Bakshi (Episode: Sahi Ka Kanta)	Prabal Gupta	DD National		
2005-2009	Sai Baba	Sai Baba of Shirdi	Star Plus		
2014-2015	Maha Kumbh: Ek Rahasaya, Ek Kahani	Gurudev	Life OK		
2015	Gangaa	Mr. Chaturvedi, Sagar's Dada	& TV		
2017-2018	Kaal Bhairav Rahasya	Shambhu Baba, the real Lord Kaal Bhairav's vahan	Star Bharat		
2021	Paapnashini Ganga	Jahnu Rishi	Ishara TV		
2022	Ali Baba: Dastaan-E-Kabul	Dara Gazi/Protector Of Marium	Sony Sab		
