= Sangdil =

1952 film by R.C. Talwar

- Theatrical release poster
- Directed by: R. C. Talwar
- Written by: Ramanand Sagar
- Screenplay by: Ramanand Sagar
- Story by: Ramanand Sagar
- Based on: Jane Eyre by Charlotte Brontë
- Produced by: R. C. Talwar
- Starring: Dilip Kumar; Madhubala
- Cinematography: Prakash Malhotra
- Edited by: Ranveer
- Music by: Sajjad Hussain
- Production company: Talwar Films Ltd.
- Distributed by: Talwar Films Ltd.
- Release date: 28 November 1952
- Running time: 141 mins
- Country: India
- Language: Hindi
- Box office: ₹95 lakh

Sangdil (transl. Stone-hearted) is a 1952 Indian Hindi-language romantic drama film directed by R. C. Talwar. The film is an adaptation of the 1847 Charlotte Brontë classic novel Jane Eyre and it stars Dilip Kumar, Madhubala in lead roles. The film's music is by Sajjad Hussain and film song lyrics by Rajinder Krishan.

Sangdil was the second film after Ram Daryani's Tarana (1951) to star Dilip Kumar and Madhubala together. The film was theatrically released on 28 November 1952 and earned ₹95 lakh (equivalent to ₹103 crore or US$11 million in 2023).

== Plot ==
Shankar and Kamala are childhood sweethearts who are unfortunately separated at a young age. They meet years later and rekindle their romance, but Shankar has a lot of dark secrets. When they are about to be married, a man shows up and confronts Shankar about his "wife", and asks him how he can marry again and cheat his first "wife".

It is then revealed that Shankar's mother, in a bout of greed, tricked him into "marrying" a mentally challenged rich woman. The insane woman is kept locked up in a dungeon. Kamala is hurt that Shankar hid all this from her and goes back to her village, despite Shankar's desperate pleas for her to stay with him. The lovers are heartbroken without each other.

Finally, when she returns to Shankar, Kamala finds out that his entire mansion was accidentally burned by the insane woman, who herself was a victim in the fire accident. She goes in search of Shankar, but realises that he was blinded in the fire. However, they declare their love for each other and are happily united.

== Cast ==
- Dilip Kumar as Shankar
- Madhubala as Kamala
- Shammi as Mohini
- Leela Chitnis as Dhaai Maa
- Pratima Devi as Badi Maa

== Soundtrack ==
The music of the film was composed by music director Sajjad Hussain and lyrics were penned by Rajinder Krishan.

| Song | Singer |
|---|---|
| "Yeh Hawa, Yeh Raat" | Talat Mahmood |
| "Kahan Ho Kahan Mere" | Talat Mahmood |
| "Dil Mein Sama Gaye Sajan, Phool Khile Chaman Chaman" | Talat Mahmood, Lata Mangeshkar |
| "Woh To Chale Gaye Ae Dil" | Lata Mangeshkar |
| "Dardbhari Kisi Ki Yaad" | Asha Bhosle |
| "Dharti Se Door, Gore Badalon Ke Par, Aaja Aaja" | Asha Bhosle, Geeta Dutt |
| "Darshan Pyasi Aayi Dasi" | Geeta Dutt |
| "Le Chal Wahan Piya" | Shamshad Begum |

== Reception ==
=== Critical reception ===
Baburao Patel, the editor of Filmindia magazine, called Sangdil "a dull, boring and stupid picture". He, however, praised Dilip Kumar's acting skills.

=== Box office ===
Despite mixed reviews, Sangdil emerged as the seventh highest-grossing film of 1952. It grossed ₹0.95 crore at the box office, including a nett of ₹0.5 crore. Box Office India declared that the film had "above average" financial returns.

== Sources ==
- Lanba, Urmila (2002). Life and Films of Dilip Kumar, the Thespian. Vision Books. ISBN 8170944961.
