= Salma (1985 film) =

- Directed by: Ramanand Sagar
- Written by: Gulshan Nanda; Tabish Sultanpur
- Produced by: Ramanand Sagar
- Starring: Raj Babbar; Salma Agha; Farooq Shaikh; Shoma Anand
- Cinematography: K Vaikunth
- Edited by: Subhash Sehgal
- Music by: Bappi Lahri
- Production company: Sagar Arts
- Release date: 1985
- Country: India
- Language: Urdu

Salma is an Indian musical romance film directed by Ramanand Sagar which was released in 1985. It stars Raj Babbar, Salma Agha, Farooq Shaikh, and Shoma Anand.

== Plot ==
In this movie two friends compete for the affection of a singer.

Lucknow-based Nawabzada Aslam lives a wealthy lifestyle along with his father, Bakar, and mother. He writes poems under the pen name of Raj Lakhnavi, and is a friend of Iqbal. One day he meets and falls in love with Salma Banarsi, a Banaras-based Courtesan. When his parents arrange his marriage with his foreign-returned cousin, Mumtaz, he informs them that he loves Salma and incurs their displeasure so much so that his father shoots him, and he is hospitalized. When he recovers fully he is shocked to find that Salma has not only accepted Iqbal as her lover, but has also taken money and jewelry from his mother. He takes to alcohol in a big way and swears to exact vengeance against Salma by marrying Mumtaz and forcing Salma to sing and dance at his wedding.

== Cast ==
- Raj Babbar as Nawabzada Aslam / Raj Lakhnauvi
- Salma Agha as Salma Banarasi
- Farooq Shaikh as Iqbal
- Shoma Anand as Mumtaz
- Pradeep Kumar as Nawab Bakar Ali
- Sushma Seth as Mrs. Bakar Ali
- Sujit Kumar as Akbar Mirza
- Prema Narayan as Courtesan
- Chandrashekhar as Thakur Balwant Singh
- Iftekhar as Ustadji

== Soundtracks ==
| Song | Singer |
|---|---|
| Zindagi Tere Dar Pe Fanaa | Salma Agha |
| Hasino Ka Dastoor | S. Janaki |
| Aye Mere Mehboob | Salma Agha, Shabbir Kumar |
| Tarasti Hai Deedar Ko | Salma Agha, Anwar |
| Aye Mere Mehboob (Sad) | Salma Agha, Shabbir Kumar |
| Shah-e-Madina | Salma Agha |
