= Prem Bandhan (1979 film) =

- Poster
- Directed by: Ramanand Sagar
- Produced by: Revati Raman Nanda; Gauri Films
- Starring: Rajesh Khanna; Rekha; Moushumi Chatterjee
- Edited by: Lachhmandass
- Music by: Laxmikant Pyarelal
- Release date: 1978
- Country: India
- Language: Hindi

Prem Bandhan (transl. The bond of love) is a 1978 Indian Hindi-language romantic drama film directed by Ramanand Sagar. A remake of the 1957 Bengali film Harano Sur, the film stars Rajesh Khanna, Rekha and Moushumi Chatterjee as the lead actors and is supported by A. K. Hangal, Prema Narayan, Bhagwan, Keshto Mukherjee and Lalita Pawar. The film's music is by Laxmikant Pyarelal.

The story revolves around the adventures of Rajesh Khanna after he has amnesia post accident and falls in love with and marries a fisher woman, whereas his sophisticated city-bred girlfriend waits for him in the city. The film had the popular song Main Tere Pyar Mein Pagal sung by Kishore Kumar and Lata Mangeshkar.

== Plot summary ==
Adivasi Mahua lives a poor lifestyle in a fishing village along with her widowed father. One day, the local Poojary comes across a seemingly menacing looking male, feeds him, and asks Mahua's dad to look after him. This male has no memory and they name him Kishan. Shortly thereafter, Mahua and Kishan fall in love and get married. After about 2 months, Kishan goes to the city and does not return home. A frantic Mahua and her father go to the police as well as to the city to search for him, albeit in vain and return home. Mahua continues to worry about Kishan and sets out on her own to try to locate him. She meets with a doctor who informs her that he recalls treating a male fitting Kishan's description and gives her his Bombay address. Mahua travels to Bombay and locates Kishan's house. This is where she will find out that Kishan now calls himself Mohan Khanna, is wealthy, lives in a mansion but who now refuses to recognize her, and is about to become formally engaged to equally wealthy Meena Mehra.

== Cast ==
- Rajesh Khanna as Kishan/Mohan Khanna
- Rekha as Mahua
- Moushami Chatterji as Meena Mehra
- Vikram as Dr. Vinod, Chanda's fiancée
- Braham Bhardawaj as Senior doctor
- Janki Dass as Rodrigues, Khanna Enterprises' accountant
- Javed Khan as Eve teaser
- Birbal as Bhelpuri vendor
- Helen
- Master Bhagwan
- Keshto Mukherjee
- Prema Narayan
- A. K. Hangal
- Lalita Pawar
- Om Shivpuri
- Chandru Atma
- Arvind Trivedi as Mahua's father
- Rippy Singh as Chanda(Courtesan)

== Soundtrack ==
All lyrics are written by Anand Bakshi; all music is composed by Laxmikant–Pyarelal.

No.	Title	Singer(s)	Length
1.	"Hoti Hai Kisise Jab Preet"	Kishore Kumar, Asha Bhonsle, Pankaj	8:20
2.	"Main Tere Pyar Mein Pagal"	Kishore Kumar, Lata Mangeshkar	6:30
3.	"Meri Payal Mein Yeh"	Asha Bhonsle	5:40
4.	"Wada Nahin Karte Kisi Se"	Lata Mangeshkar, Mahendra Kapoor, Chorus	9:20
