= Dvivida =

Hindu literature character

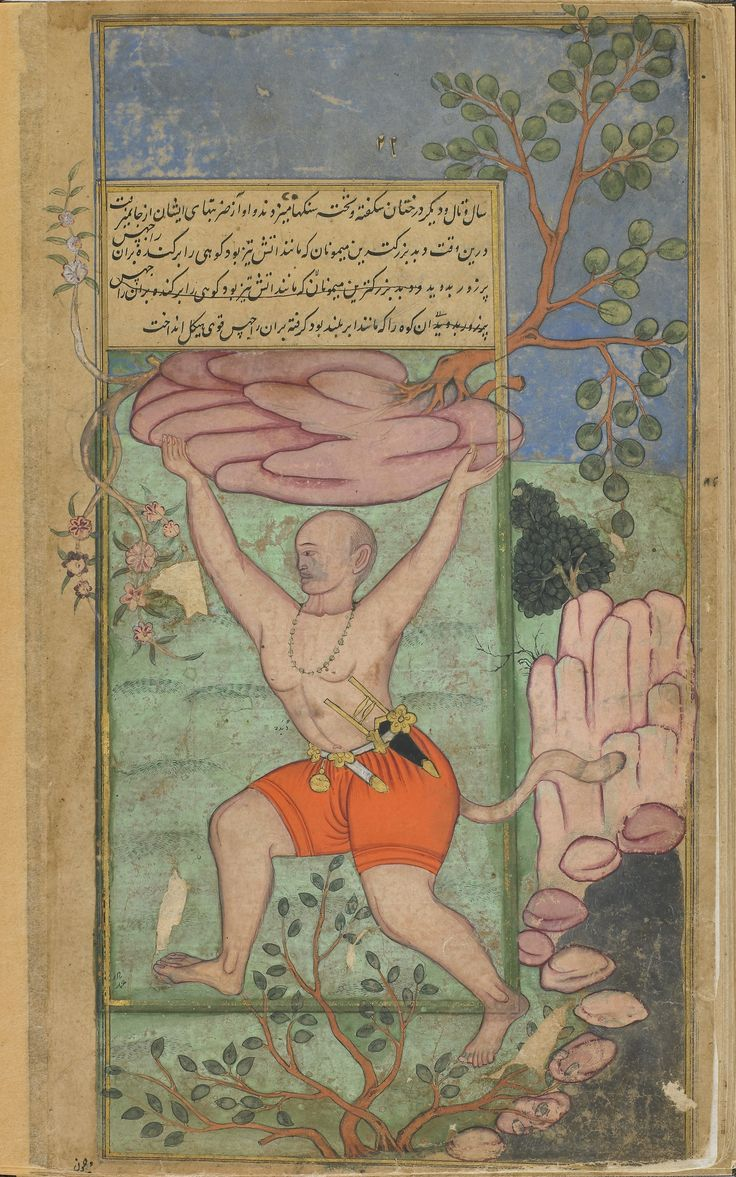
Dvivida hurls an uprooted mountain at Kumbhakarna

Dvivida is the name of various monkey-like characters featured in Hinduism.

- He is an asura featured in the Brahma Purana, and other texts of Hindu literature. This asura is slain by Balarama.
- He is one of Mainda's brothers, who according to the Ramayana, helped Rama and his brother Lakshmana in defeating Ravana.

== Legend ==
Dvivida is a monkey-like asura of great prowess. He swears revenge on Krishna and all the devas after the death of his friend, Narakasura. He interrupted yajñas and all those who practised them. He demolished rites of sacrifice and burnt territories, cities, as well as villages. He is stated to have uprooted mountains and hurled them into oceans. The ocean was so excessively distressed that it overflew the shores, flooding the villages and cities nearby. The wicked creature also destroyed trees and plants, so much so that the universe is described to have bewailed his existence. He came across the deity Balarama, his wife Revati, and several noble ladies who sipped wine in a garden. The asura seized the ploughshare and the threshing rod of Balarama, and began to imitate him, right in front of him. After he started to destroy the vessels, the angry Balarama held his iron club, and crushed a boulder that was thrown towards him to bits. When Dvivida strikes Balarama on his chest, the deity pummels his fist against the asura, slaying him. Upon his death, the devas showered flowers upon him and praised his name.
