= Magarwara =

Magarwara Magarwāra
- Village
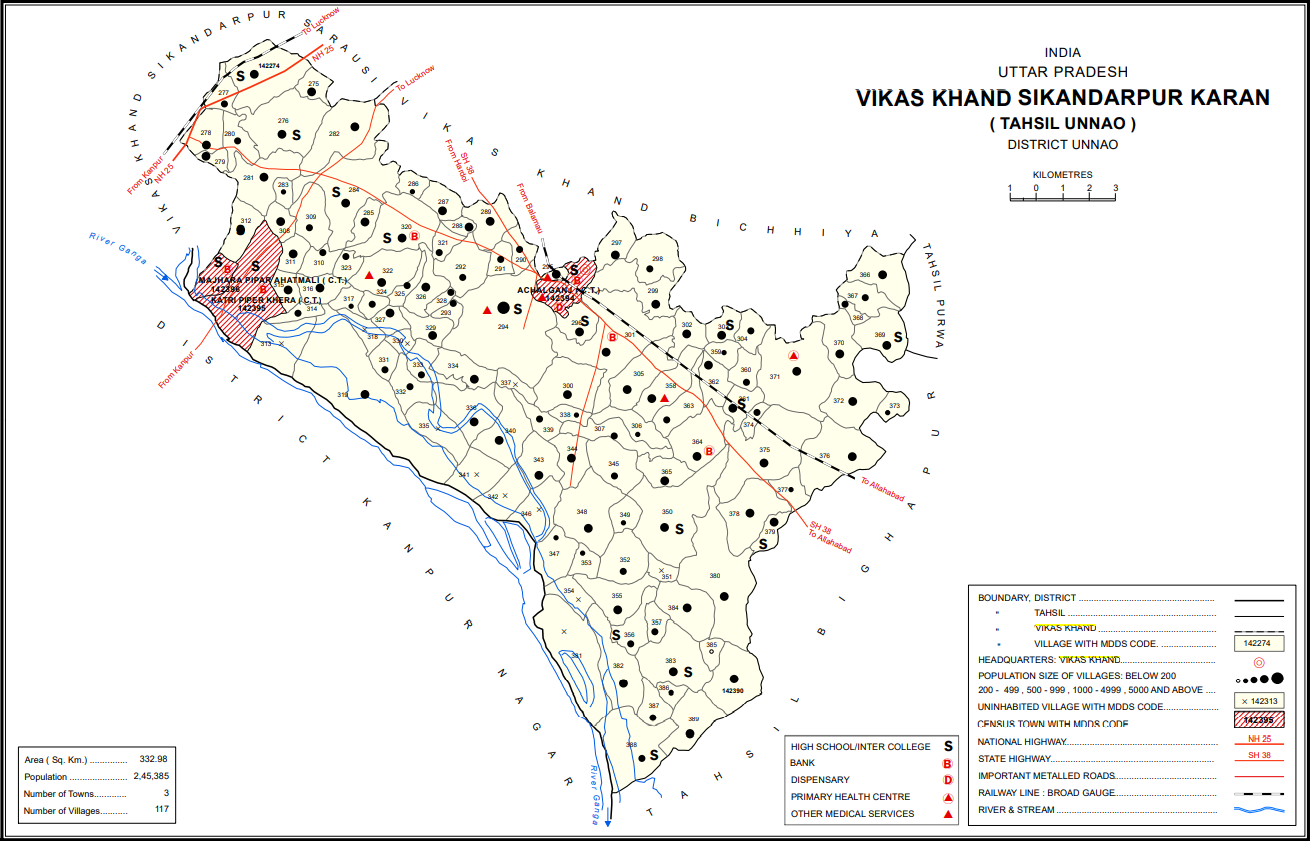
- Map showing Magarwara (#274) in Sikandarpur Karan CD block

- Location in Uttar Pradesh, India
- Coordinates: 26.515088°N 80.431261°E
- Country India: India
- State: Uttar Pradesh
- District: Unnao

Area
  - Total: 4.793 km^{2} (1.851 sq mi)

Population (2011)
  - Total: 6,584
  - Density: 1,374/km^{2} (3,558/sq mi)

Languages
  - Official: Hindi
- Time zone: UTC+5:30 (IST)
- Vehicle registration: UP-35

Magarwara is a village in Sikandarpur Karan block of Unnao district, Uttar Pradesh, India. It is located 6 km from the district headquarters, Unnao. It is located on state highways and has one primary school and no healthcare facilities. It has a train station on the Lucknow-Kanpur line, between Kanpur Bridge and Unnao train station; the same stretch of track is also connected with Rae Bareli and Balamau station past Unnao. Magarwara Bone Mill, established in 1927, is one of the major industrial establishments in Unnao district. As of 2011, its population is 6,584, in 1,263 households.

The 1961 census recorded Magarwara as comprising 7 hamlet, with a total population of 2,583 (1,534 male and 1,049 female), in 501 households and 461 physical houses. The area of the village was given as 1,184 acres. It was electrified and had a medical practitioner and post office at the time. (As of 2011, it does not have a post office.) In addition to the bone mill, Magarwara had the following small-scale industrial establishments: 6 grain mills, 1 small producer of edible fats or oils, 1 miscellaneous food processing facility, and 2 makers of sundry hardwares.
