= Ramanand Sagar =

Indian filmmaker (1917–2005)

Dr.Ramanand Sagar
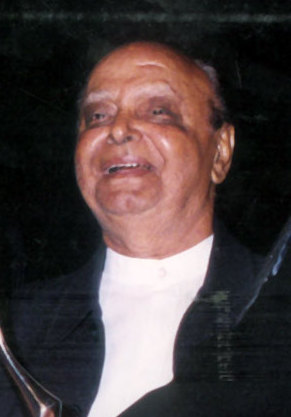
- Born: Chandramauli Chopra; 29 December 1917; Asal Guruke, Punjab, British India (present-day Punjab, Pakistan)
- Died: 12 December 2005 (aged 87); Mumbai, Maharashtra, India
- Education: University of the Punjab
- Occupations: Director; producer; writer
- Years active: 1949–2005
- Notable work: Ramayan 1984
- Spouse: Leelavati Sagar
- Children: 5- Subhash Sagar, Shanti Sagar, Anand Sagar, Prem Sagar, Moti Sagar, Sarita Chaudhry
- Relatives: Chitu Chopra (brother), Vidhu Vinod Chopra (half-brother)
- Awards: Padma Shri (2000)
- Website: https://www.sagarworld.com/

Ramanand Sagar (born Chandramauli Chopra; 29 December 1917 – 12 December 2005) was an Indian film-television director, producer, and writer. He is best known for writing and directing television serials Ramayan (1987–1988), Luv Kush (1988–1989) and Shri Krishna (1993–1999), which broke several viewership records globally.

== Early life ==
Sagar was born at Asal Guruke near Lahore. His great-grandfather, Lala Shankar Das Chopra, migrated from Lahore to Kashmir.

== Career ==
In 1932, Sagar started his film career as a clapper boy in a silent film, Raiders of the Rail Road. He then shifted to Bombay in 1949 after India's partition.

In 1944, he acted in Punjabi film Koel, directed by Roop K. Shorey, made in Lahore released on Friday, 24 November by Film Company Shorey Pictures.

In the 1940s, Sagar started out as an assistant stage manager in Prithvi Theatres of Prithviraj Kapoor. He also directed a few plays under the fatherly guidance of Kapoor.

Along with other films that Sagar himself directed, he wrote the story and screenplay for Raj Kapoor's superhit Barsaat. He produced and directed films like Bazooband and Mehmaan which bombed at the box-office .

Due to his unsuccessful career in Bollywood, Sagar shifted to Madras and start working for Gemini Studio. He wrote story, screenplay and dialogues for Gemini classics like Insaniyat (1955), Raj Tilak (1958) and Paigham (1959), the 1959 classic featuring Dilip Kumar, Raaj Kumar and Vjyanthimala fetched him Filmfare Award for Best Dialogue. Sagar's collaboration with Gemini Studio proved to be fruitful for his career. Gemini's owner SS Vasan was impressed with Sagar's professionalism and advised him to direct films again. Under the Vasan's tutelage, Sagar directed Ghunghat (1960) and Zindagi (1964) for Gemini Studio which were successful commercially and critically. He even wrote the Shammi Kapoor and Sadhana starrer Rajkumar (1964) for another South Indian banner. Ghunghat and Zindagi's success gave him the confidence to re-start his career as a producer and director. Sagar moved back to Mumbai and re-christened his Production House as Sagar Films. The first film under the Sagar Arts banner was Rajendra Kumar, Sadhana and Feroz Khan starrer Arzoo, which became a blockbuster. He won Filmfare Best Director Award for his spy thriller Aankhen. His films in the early 1970s were not successful like Geet and Laalkar. He directed one of the top five grossing films of 1976, Charas, starring Dharmendra and Hema Malini. In 1979, his directorial venture Prem Bandhan starring Rajesh Khanna, Rekha and Moushmi Chatterjee was successful commercially, becoming the sixth highest-grossing film of that year. In 1982, he directed Baghavat, starring Dharmendra, Hema Malini and Reena Roy which turned out to be a huge hit.

In 1985, he directed Salma which was unsuccessful at the box office and though the music of the film romance was popular, the film did not perform well at box office.

In 1985 Sagar turned towards television with Dada Dadi Ki Kahaniyaan which was directed by Moti Sagar and produced by Ramanand Sagar. Then his Sagar Arts began producing serials based on Indian history. His directorial venture Ramayan aired its first episode on 25 January 1987. His next tele-serials were Luv Kush and Shri Krishna, which were both produced and directed by him. He also later directed Sai Baba. Sagar also made fantasy serials like Vikram Aur Betaal and Alif Laila.

The Ramayan series was initially conceptualized to run for 52 episodes of 45 minutes each. Owing to popular demand it had to be extended thrice, eventually ending after 78 episodes.

Sagar made a Luv Kush episode after receiving a call from PMO.

Based on his experiences of the Indo-Pak partition, Sagar published the Hindi-Urdu book Aur Insaan Mar Gaya (transl. And The Human Died) in 1948.

The government of India honoured Sagar with the Padma Shri in 2000. Sagar died on 12 December 2005 aged 88 at his home in Mumbai after a series of health problems.

In December 2019, his son Prem Sagar launched a book on his life, An Epic Life: Ramanand Sagar, From Barsaat to Ramayan. This book is a biography of Ramanand Sagar depicting his life struggles and his journey from a clerk to one of the greatest filmmakers of all time.

== Personal life ==
Ramanand Sagar's father Lala Dinanath Chopra had two wives. After the first wife passed away, he married his second wife, Shanti Devi Chopra, was the mother of Vidhu Vinod Chopra. Ramanand Sagar was married to Leelavati, with whom he had five children, four sons (Anand, Prem, Moti and Subhash) and a daughter (Sarita). On 31 August 2025, his son Prem Sagar, a veteran cinematographer and FTII alumnus, died at the age of 81 at his residence.

== Filmography ==
=== Films ===
Year	Title	Director	Writer	Producer
1949	Ek Teri Nishani	No	Yes	No
1949	Barsaat	No	Yes	No
1950	Jan Pahechan	No	Yes	No
1951	Badi Bahu	No	Yes	No
1952	Sangdil	No	Yes	No
1953	Mehmaan	Yes	No	No
1954	Bazooband	Yes	Yes	No
1956	Mem Sahib	No	Yes	No
1958	Raj Tilak	No	Yes	No
1959	Paigham	No	Yes	No
1960	Ghunghat	Yes	No	No
1964	Rajkumar	No	Yes	No
1964	Zindagi	Yes	No	Yes
1965	Arzoo	Yes	Yes	Yes
1968	Ankhen	Yes	Yes	Yes
1970	Geet	Yes	No	Yes
1972	Lalkaar	Yes	Yes	Yes
1973	Jalte Badan	Yes	Yes	Yes
1976	Charas	Yes	Yes	Yes
1979	Prem Bandhan	Yes	No	No
1979	Hum Tere Ashiq Hain	No	Yes	No
1981	Armaan	No	No	Yes
1982	Baghavat	Yes	No	Yes
1983	Romance	Yes	No	Yes
1985	Salma	Yes	No	Yes

=== Acting credits ===
Year	Title	Role	Note
1943	Koel	Unknown	Film; Punjabi language
1987-1988	Ramayan	Narrator	Television series
1993	Shri Krishna	Narrator	Television series
2000	Jai Mahalakshmi	Narrator	Television series

=== Television ===
Year	Title	Director	Writer	Producer	Editor
1985-1986	Vikram Aur Betaal	Yes	No	Yes	No
1986-1987	Dada Dadi Ki Kahaniyan	Yes	Yes	Yes	No
1987-1988	Ramayan	Yes	Yes	Yes	No
1988-1989	Luv Kush	Yes	No	Yes	No
1993-1997	Alif Laila	No	No	Yes	No
1993-1997	Shri Krishna	Yes	No	Yes	No
1997	Yeh Hai Mere Apne	Yes	Yes	Yes	Yes
1997	Jai Ganga Maiya	Yes	No	No	No
1999	Aangan	Yes	Yes	Yes	Yes
2000	Aakash	Yes	Yes	Yes	Yes
2000	Shree Brahma Vishnu Mahesh	Yes	Yes	Yes	Yes
2000	Jai Mahalakshmi	Yes	Yes	Yes	No
2001	Chingaari	Yes	Yes	Yes	Yes
2001	Sansaar	Yes	No	Yes	Yes
2001	Jai Jai Jai Tridev	Yes	Yes	Yes	Yes
2002	Saanjhi	Yes	Yes	Yes	Yes
2002	Bhagat Singh	No	No	Yes	No
2003	Arzoo Hai Tu	Yes	No	No	No
2005	Sai Baba	Yes	Yes	No	No

== Awards and honors ==
In 1996, he was honored with the Sahitya Vachaspati (Doctor of Literature) by the Hindi Sahitya Sammelan in Allahabad. In 1997, Jammu University presented him a honoris causa doctorate (Doctor of Literature). In 2000, he was honoured with Padma Shri by the Government of India. In 2004, he received a special award for his contribution to Indian Television at the Indian Telly Awards.

Filmfare Awards

Year	Category	Work	Result	Ref.
1960	Best Dialogue	Paigham	Won	
1966	Best Story	Arzoo	Nominated	
1966	Best Director	Arzoo	Nominated	
1969	Best Director	Aankhen	Won	
1969	Best Story	Aankhen	Nominated	
