= Dwarkadheesh Bhagwan Shree Krishn =

- Genre: Mythology; Drama
- Created by: Sagar Pictures
- Written by: Kamal Pandey; Raghuvir Shekhawat
- Directed by: Bhushan Patel; Mukesh Singh
- Creative directors: Amrit Sagar Chopra; Akash Sagar Chopra
- Starring: See below
- Theme music composer: Sunny Bawra, Inder Bawra
- Composer: Ravindra Jain
- Country of origin: India
- Original language: Hindi
- No. of seasons: 2
- No. of episodes: 204

Production
- Producers: Moti Sagar; Meenakshi Sagar
- Cinematography: Deepak Malwankar
- Running time: 20 Minutes
- Production company: Sagar Pictures

Original release
- Network: Imagine TV
- Release: 4 July 2011 – 11 May 2012

Related
- Dwarkadheesh Bhagwaan Shree Krishn - Sarvkala Sampann

Dwarkadheesh Bhagwaan Shree Krishna is an Indian television mythological series. It first aired on 4 July 2011 on Imagine TV and was stopped midway with the shutdown of Imagine TV in May 2012. The series intended to show Krishna as a valiant lover; a master strategist; and an ideal brother, father, son, and king. Ravindra Jain composed the title song (sung by Anup Jalota) and the music for the initial episodes. Afterwards, the composer was replaced by music director-duo Sunny Bawra and Inder Bawra (Bawra Bros). The serial was produced by Sagar Films and had a re-run during the pandemic in 2020.

== Plot ==
The series focused on Krishna's adventures as the king of Mathura and on his relationships with his elder brother Balram, sister-in-law Revati, and wife-to-be Rukmini.

The series followed Krishna's life after he killed his evil uncle, demon-king Kamsa, and became king of Dwarka. It begins with Krishna engaging in battle with the wicked Kalayavana, an ally of king Jarasandh of Magadh, who has already lost 16 battles against king Krishna.

== Cast ==
- Vishal Karwal as Krishna (incarnation of Lord Vishnu)
- Hemant Chaddha as Balram
- Gauri Singh as Revati
- Priya Bathija / Payal Shrivastav as Rukmini (incarnation of Goddess Lakshmi)
- Gautam Sharma as Arjun
- Shantipriya as Devki (Krishna's mother)
- Puneet Issar as Jarasandh of Magadh
- Ram Awana as Paundraka Vasudeva
- Nikitin Dheer as Kalayavana
- Karan Khanna as Shishupala of Chedi (final demon incarnation of Jai, gatekeeper of Vaikunth)
- Arun Singh as Jwala
- Urvashi Pardeshi as Satyabhama
- Rashmi Singh as Jambavati
- Mamik Singh as Bhishma
- Gufi Paintal as Shakuni, King of Gandhar
- Sachin Verma as Yudhishthir
- Amit Pachori as Duryodhan
- Thakur Anoop Singh as Dushasan
- Lankesh Bhardwaj as Thakur Akhilesh
- Nishant Kumar as Uddhav
- Ram Bahadur Renu as Sudama
