= Sagar Pictures Entertainment =

Indian film production company

- Industry: Media
- Founded: 1950
- Founder: Ramanand Sagar
- Headquarters: Mumbai, India
- Key people: Ramanand Sagar, Moti Sagar, Amrit Sagar, Akash Sagar Chopra, Meenakshi Sagar,
- Products: Television; Films
- Number of employees: 100
- Website: Official Website Official Website

Sagar Pictures Entertainment is an Indian film and television production company based in Mumbai, India. It was founded by Ramanand Sagar and is a part of the Sagar Group of companies owned by the Sagar family.

Sagar Pictures is also a dubbing studio that has dubbed for hundreds of foreign Television programs, films, and documentaries.

== Movies produced ==
Year	Film	Language	Notes
1965	Arzoo	Hindi	
1968	Ankhen	Hindi	
1970	Geet	Hindi	
1972	Lalkaar	Hindi	
1973	Jalte Badan	Hindi	
1976	Charas	Hindi	
1979	Prem Bandhan	Hindi	
1981	Armaan	Hindi	
1982	Baghavat	Hindi	
1983	Romance	Hindi	
1985	Salma	Urdu	
2007	1971	Hindi	
2013	Rabba Main Kya Karoon	Hindi	
2015	Mitwaa	Marathi	

== TV series produced ==
Year	Serial	Channel	Notes
1985	Vikram Betaal	DD National	
1986-1987	Dada Dadi Ki Kahaniyan	DD National	
1987–1988	Ramayan	DD National	
1988	Luv Kush	DD National	
1993–1997	Alif Laila	DD National	
1993–1997	Shri Krishna	DD National	
1997-2000	Jai Ganga Maiya		
2000-2001	Jai Mahalakshmi	DD National	
2000-2001	Shree Brahma Vishnu Mahesh	SAB TV	
2001	Aankhen	DD National	
2003–2004	Hatim	Star Plus	
2004–2005	Princess Dollie Aur Uska Magic Bag	Star Plus	initially titled Hello Dollie
2005	Akkad Bakkad Bambey Bo	Star Plus	
2005	Hotel Kingston	STAR One	
2005-2009	Sai Baba	Star Plus	
2006	Lucky	Star Plus	
2006–2009	Dharti Ka Veer Yodha Prithviraj Chauhan	Star Plus	
2007	Jai Maa Durga	Star Plus	
2007–2009	Aladdin	Zee TV	
2008–2009	Jai Shri Krishna	Colors TV	
2008	Dharam Veer	Imagine TV	
2008	Vijay - Desh Ki Aankhen	Imagine TV	
2008	Arslaan	Sony Entertainment Television	
2008–2009	Mahima Shani Dev Ki	Imagine TV	
2009	Shakuntala	STAR One	
2009	Basera	Imagine TV	
2009	Jo Ishq Ki Marzi Woh Rab Ki Marzi	Sahara One	
2009–2010	Meera	Imagine TV	
2011–2012	Dwarkadheesh Bhagwaan Shree Krishn	Imagine TV	
2011–2012	Chandragupta Maurya	Imagine TV	
2010	Jai Jai Shiv Shankar	Mahuaa TV	
2012	Shri Prannathji TV Serial	Imagine TV; Sanskar TV	Official Website
2011–2015	Jai Jai Jai Bajrang Bali	Sahara One	
2012	Aasman Se Aage	Life OK	
2015	Chatur aur Chalak - Beerbal aur Virat (Season 1)	Big Magic	
2015–2016	Janbaaz Sindbad	Zee TV	
2019- 2020	Dwarkadheesh Bhagwaan Shree Krishn - Sarvkala Sampann	Dangal tv	
2024	Jai mata Vaishno Devi Ki	DD National	
2024-present	Kakabhushundi Ramayan	DD National	
2025-present	Kaamdhenu GauMatha	Star Bharat	
