= 1920 (disambiguation) =

1920 was a leap year starting on Thursday of the Gregorian calendar.

1920 may also refer to:

- 1920 BC, a year in the 20th century BC
- 1920 (number), a number
- 1920 (film series), a series of Indian horror films written by Vikram Bhatt
  - 1920 (film), the first installment of the series
