= Dwarkadheesh Bhagwan Shree Krishn – Sarvkala Sampann =

- Genre: Mythology, drama
- Created by: Sagar Pictures
- Written by: Moti Sagar; Umesh Chandra Upadhyay
- Directed by: Neeraj Pandey; Pradeep P Jadhav
- Creative director: Sudha Saliyan
- Starring: See below
- Theme music composer: Sunny Bawra; Inder Bawra
- Composer: Ravindra Jain
- Country of origin: India
- Original language: Hindi
- No. of seasons: 1

Production
- Producer: Meenakshi Sagar
- Cinematography: Deepak Malwankar
- Editors: Shams Mishra; Vikram Mishra
- Running time: 20 minutes
- Production company: Sagar Films

Original release
- Network: Dangal TV
- Release: 3 June 2019 – 2020

Dwarkadheesh Bhagwaan Shree Krishn – Sarvkala Sampann is a Hindi-language mythological series that was aired on Dangal TV under the banner of Sagar Arts. It stars Vishal Karwal, Chahat Pandey and others. It is the second season of the 2011 Television series Dwarkadheesh Bhagwaan Shree Krishn which was aired on Imagine TV after its shutdown in May 2012.

== Plot ==
Story of Radha and Krishna. A girl is crying in Krishna's court and asks to get him justice. Then Krishna asked what happened, then she says that her beloved loves that girl and marries another girl, she is cheated with her, she has bread to get justice, later she is killed by drinking poison. Then Krishna remembers his story very much that he did love to Radha and married Rukmini. He keeps on remembering later. On this side Radha is yearning to meet Krishna. She waits for the lunar eclipse because when Krishna left Radha and went to Mathura, then he had promised Radha that when the lunar eclipse happens, then he will meet in the battlefield of Kurukshetra.

== Cast ==
- Vishal Karwal as Krishna
- Chahat Pandey as Radha
- Neetha Shetty as Rukmini
- Nisha Nagpal as Subhadra
- Abhinav Singh Kant as Arjuna
- Ram Awana as Shakuni
- Saba Khan as Satyabhama

== See also ==
- List of programmes broadcast by Dangal TV
