= Badhaai Ho (soundtrack) =

2018 soundtrack album

Soundtrack album by Tanishk Bagchi, Rochak Kohli, JAM8, Sunny and Inder Bawra
- Released: 27 September 2018
- Genre: Feature film soundtrack
- Length: 17:29
- Language: Hindi
- Label: T-Series
External audio
- Official Audio Jukebox on YouTube

Tanishk Bagchi chronology
Jalebi (2018)	Badhaai Ho (2018)	Baazaar (2018)

JAM8 chronology
Loveyatri (2018)	Badhaai Ho (2018)	Villain (2018)

Rochak Kohli chronology
Batti Gul Meter Chalu (2018)	Badhaai Ho (2018)	Why Cheat India (2019)

Sunny and Inder Bawra chronology
Rocky Handsome (2016)	Badhaai Ho (2018)	Hotel Mumbai (2019)

Badhaai Ho is the soundtrack album to the 2018 film of the same name directed by Amit Ravindernath Sharma starring Ayushmann Khurrana, Sanya Malhotra, Gajraj Rao and Neena Gupta. The soundtrack featured five songs composed by Tanishk Bagchi, Rochak Kohli, JAM8 and Sunny and Inder Bawra, and lyrics written by Vayu Shrivastav, Kumaar and MellowD. T-Series released the soundtrack on 27 September 2018.

== Release ==
The first song from the album "Badhaaiyan Tenu" was released on 20 September 2018. It was composed by Tanishk Bagchi and written by Vayu Shrivastav, a partner of Tanishk-Vayu, and sung by Brijesh Shandilya, Romy and Jordan. The second song "Morni Banke" released on 27 September. The song Morni Banke was originally composed by Punjabi MC and recreated by Tanishk Bagchi; the new lyrics were written by MellowD and recorded by Guru Randhawa and Neha Kakkar. The album was released on the same date under the T-Series label. Afterwards, the video songs of "Nain Na Jodeen", "Sajan Bade Senti" were released on 3 and 10 October.

== Reception ==
Debarati S Sen of The Times of India reviewed "Badhaaiyan Tenu" and summarized "though the composition has folk in its core, the production is contemporary with ample use of instruments from the heartlands" and complimented the singers' rendition that provided a "typical rustic flavour"; about "Morni Banke", she summarized that the song's "racy beats will prompt you to break into a bhangra too"; Sen noted that the nostalgia-evoking composition of "Nain Na Jodeen" by Rochak Kohli was reminiscent of 1990s melodies; "Sajan Bade Senti" was considered "another fun composition" from JAM8 where the band's "deft mixing and use of contemporary beats along with folk instruments is what makes this track peppy and memorable" complimenting the lyrics and vocals. Kavya of Radio Mirchi summarized "From toe-tapping tunes that compelled us to dance to soulful melodies that tugged at our heartstrings, these songs have become an integral part of the movie's charm." Devansh Sharma of Firstpost wrote "As a whole, the music of Badhaai Ho is celebratory for most part, barring the ruminating 'Nain Na Jodeen'. All the songs, full of fun and frolic [...] will make your foot tap and tickle the funny bone."

Joginder Tuteja of Bollywood Hungama wrote "Talking of music, 'Badhaaiyan Tenu' is the best of the lot and is very catchy. 'Sajan Bade Senti' is average but is presented very well. 'Nain Na Jodeen' is touching but the impact is limited as the romantic track is not that strong. 'Morni Banke' appears during the end credits and is okay." Manas Tiwari of The Financial Express wrote "There are no stand out tracks in the film but the album as a whole does its job effectively. 'Nain Na Jodeen' is touching, 'Sajan Bade Senti' is average and 'Morni Banke' will make you wait for the end credits to finish before leaving the theatre. 'Badhaaiyan Tenu' is the best of the lot and has been used well in the film." Avinash Ramachandran of Cinema Express wrote "Songs by Tanishk Bagchi, JAM8 and Rochak Kohli enliven the proceedings a great deal."

== Track listing ==
No.	Title	Lyrics	Music	Singer(s)	Length
1.	"Badhaaiyan Tenu"	Vayu Shrivastav	Tanishk Bagchi	Brijesh Shandilya, Romy, Jordan	2:19
2.	"Morni Banke"	MellowD	Tanishk Bagchi	Guru Randhawa, Neha Kakkar	3:18
3.	"Nain Na Jodeen"	Kumaar	Rochak Kohli	Ayushmann Khurrana, Neha Kakkar	4:34
4.	"Sajan Bade Senti"	Vayu Shrivastav	JAM8	Dev Negi, Harjot Kaur	2:32
5.	"Jug Jug Jeeve"	Kumaar	Sunny and Inder Bawra	Shubha Mudgal	4:46
Total length:					17:29
