= Vijay (TV series) =

- Also known as: Vijay - Desh Ki Aankhen
- Written by: Moti Sagar
- Creative director: Amrit Sagar
- Opening theme: "Vijay - Desh Ki Aankhen" Akash Sagar
- Country of origin: India

Production
- Producers: Moti Sagar; Amrit Sagar
- Production locations: Mumbai, Maharashtra
- Camera setup: Multi-camera
- Running time: 32-52 minutes
- Production company: Sagar Arts

Original release
- Network: NDTV Imagine
- Release: 26 July 2008 – 11 May 2012

Vijay - Desh Ki Aankhen is an Indian Hindi-language army themed television series that premiered from 26 June 2008 to 11 May 2012 on NDTV Imagine The show was produced by Moti Sagar, and Amrit Sagar under Sagar Films.

== Concept ==
The “Vijay” team is a privately funded, parallel security agency which exists with the knowledge and consent of the Indian Government. Under the leadership of Colonel Ranjit Singh, this elite group of six officers investigates and prosecutes those accused of crime. The arch villain in the show is Dinaro, an ex-army man and former colleague of the Colonel. While the Colonel treads the righteous path, Dinaro is motivated by greed and money and has chosen to follow the path that glorifies anarchy and anti-nationalism. As Dinaro terrorizes the nation's peace through his nexus, the ‘Vijay’ team strives to overcome these threats and invariably thwart his plans. The team works together with a single mission: to safeguard the nation!

== Cast ==
- Pankaj Kalra as Colonel Ranjit Singh
- Survinder Singh as Major Kartar Singh
- Sagar Saini as Ajay
- Chandan Madan as Sanjay
- Zeyaul Haque as Nikhil
- Kunal Bakshi as Karan
- Vijay Badlani as Vishal
- Romanch Mehta as Zoro, a terrorist
- Irfan Hussain as Dinaroo
