= 1920 London =

2016 film by Tinu Suresh Desai

- Theatrical release poster
- Directed by: Tinu Suresh Desai
- Written by: Girish Dhamija (dialogues)
- Screenplay by: Sukhmani Sadana
- Story by: Vikram Bhatt
- Produced by: Vikram Bhatt
- Starring: Sharman Joshi; Meera Chopra; Vishal Karwal
- Cinematography: Prakash Kutty
- Edited by: Kuldeep Mehan
- Music by: Songs: Shaarib-Toshi; JAM8; Score: Amar Mohile
- Production company: Reliance Entertainment
- Distributed by: Reliance Entertainment
- Release date: 6 May 2016
- Running time: 117 minutes
- Country: India
- Language: Hindi
- Budget: ₹21 crore
- Box office: ₹22.67 crore

1920 London is a 2016 Indian supernatural horror film directed by Tinu Suresh Desai. It is the third installment in the 1920 film series, after 1920 and 1920: The Evil Returns. The film stars Sharman Joshi, Meera Chopra, and Vishal Karwal in lead roles. The film follows a wife who seeks the help of her ex lover, a shaman to free her husband from demonic possession, not realizing that the ex-lover has a personal vendetta against her. The film managed to recover its budget and became a moderate success but it could not repeat the success of its previous installments. It was followed by another installment titled 1921.

== Plot ==
Princess Shivangi from Sikar, Rajasthan lives in London with her husband, Kunwar Veer Singh. Veer receives a strange locket as a gift from an unknown admirer in Rajasthan. A ghost comes out of the locket and possess Veer. Without knowing Veer is possessed, Shivangi admits Veer in a hospital. Veer's body begins to contort unnaturally and Veer begins growling in strange languages. The doctors seem to diagnose it as tetanus, which is incurable. Shivangi's handmaiden, Kesar Ma, deems it as black magic. As the doctors are unable to save Veer, Shivangi visits her family in Rajasthan. Shivangi and her family visit an exorcist to remedy Veer's condition. The exorcist attempts to confront the ghost by entering the other realm through a mirror but is soon expelled, being too weak to confront the ghost. The exorcist ask Shivangi's family to visit Mewar Baba whose real name is Jai Singh Gujjar.

Some years ago, Shivangi was deeply in love with Jai. Rana saw Shivangi and Jai together and attempted to misbehave with Shivangi but Jai intervened. Rana reports Shivangi and Jai's relationship to Shivangi's father. Jai was charged with attempted murder and Shivangi testifies against Jai. Jai was then sentenced to prison for five years.

Shivangi meets and pleads with Jai to help Veer. Jai finally agrees to go to London. Jai investigates the matter and discovers that Veer's troubles began upon receiving the strange locket. Jai proves about the possession to the doctors and the doctors agree to discharge Veer. At Veer's house, Jai makes Shivangi into reciting a spiritual chant to bind the spirit and Jai throws the locket into the Thames River. It is revealed that the locket was actually sent by Jai to get revenge on Shivangi for Jai's false imprisonment. Jai pretends to help but continues to inflict more pain to Shivangi. Shivangi confronts Jai about knowing the source of the locket and Jai admits everything to Shivangi.

Shivangi reveals to Jai that Shivangi's father would have killed Jai if Shivangi did not agree to falsely imprison Jai.

After hearing the truth, Jai agrees to help. Jai traps the ghost in a bottle and buries the bottle in a graveyard but the ghost escapes and attacks Jai. Jai meets and asks help from his Guru. Jai's guru regretfully says that the ghost will not leave without taking a soul. Jai's guru directs Jai to an abandoned church where Jai and Shivaangi receive a pair of knives. Jai enters the other realm through a mirror. The ghost attacks Jai which also affects the real world. Jai recovers the locket and throws the locket to Shivangi through the mirror. Jai smashes the mirror to close the portal which traps Jai in the other realm. Shivangi burns the locket which destroys the ghost and Veer comes back to normal. Shivangi sees Jai smile peacefully from a shard of the mirror before the shard breaks. After two weeks, Veer and Shivangi find the letter from Jai. Jai had offered Jai's soul so Veer could be freed. Veer is touched and places Jai's photograph on a shelf along with other photos.

== Cast ==
- Sharman Joshi as Jai Singh Gujjar
- Meera Chopra as Shivangi
- Vishal Karwal as Veer Singh
- Meenal Kapoor as Witch
- Gajendra Chauhan as Tantrik
- Sushmita Mukherjee as Kesar Maa
- Surendra Pal as Raja, Shivangi's father

== Reception ==
1920 London received generally negative reviews from critics. Mohar Basu of The Times of India gave the film 1/5 stars and wrote,"There isn't an inkling of innovative thinking in the third installment of the 1920 series. The best thing that can be said about it is that it will remain one of the year's funniest films".

Manjusha of Gulf News gave 1.5/5 to the film and wrote,"Vikram Bhatt exhausts every cliché that has been regurgitated in Bollywood love stories. Corny dialogues such as "we will live together and die together" and sappy songs with lovers dancing around in picturesque locations will make you nauseous. While the first few scenes in which evil spirit unleashes her fury are startling, it gets tiring".

== Music ==
1920 London

Soundtrack album by Shaarib-Toshi, and Kaushik-Akash for JAM8
- Released: 21 April 2016
- Genre: Feature film soundtrack
- Length: 26:31
- Label: T-Series, Saregama

Singles from 1920 London
- 1. "Gumnaan Hai Koi" Released: 9 April 2016; 2. "Aaj Ro Len De" Released: 15 April 2016

The music for 1920 London is composed by Shaarib-Toshi, and JAM8. The first song "Gumnaan Hai Koi" which was a recreated version of the original song from the 1965 film Gumnaam was released on 9 April 2016. The music rights of the film are acquired by T-Series except the "Gumnaam" song which is bought by Saregama. The full music album was released on 21 April 2016.

No.	Title	Lyrics	Music	Singer(s)	Length
1.	"Gumnaam Hai Koi"	Kunaal Vermaa	Kaushik-Akash for JAM8	Jubin Nautiyal, Antara Mitra	4:25
2.	"Aaj Ro Len De"	Shaarib-Toshi, Kalim Sheikh	Shaarib-Toshi	Shaarib Sabri	4:46
3.	"Aafreen"	Prashant Ingole	Kaushik & Akash for JAM8	K.K, Antara Mitra	3:45
4.	"Tujhko Mein"	Azim Shirazi	Shaarib-Toshi	Shaan	4:43
5.	"Rootha Kyun"	Azim Shirazi	Shaarib-Toshi	Mohit Chauhan, Payal Dev	5:02
6.	"Aafreen (2nd Version)"	Prashant Ingole	Kaushik-Akash for JAM8	Sreeram, Antara Mitra	3:49
Total length:					26:31

== Sequel ==
A sequel of the film was announced in June 2016 by the makers. The film was titled 1921 and was released in 2018.
