= 1920 (film) =

2008 Indian film by Vikram Bhatt

- Promotional release poster
- Directed by: Vikram Bhatt
- Screenplay by: Dheeraj Rattan
- Dialogue by: Girish Dhamija
- Story by: Vikram Bhatt
- Produced by: Surendra Sharma; Bhagwati Gabrani; Amita Bishnoi
- Starring: Rajneesh Duggal; Adah Sharma; Indraneil Sengupta; Anjori Alagh
- Cinematography: Pravin Bhatt
- Edited by: Kuldeep Mehan
- Music by: Score: Raju Rao; Songs: Adnan Sami; Salim–Sulaiman
- Production companies: ASA Productions and Enterprises Pvt. Ltd.
- Distributed by: BIG Pictures
- Release date: 12 September 2008
- Running time: 129 minutes
- Country: India
- Language: Hindi
- Budget: ₹7 crore
- Box office: ₹14.5 crore

1920 is a 2008 Indian Hindi-language supernatural horror film written and directed by Vikram Bhatt. Set in the year 1920, the film stars debutant actors Rajneesh Duggal and Adah Sharma as a married couple who move into a haunted manor where the wife gets possessed by an evil spirit. Loosely inspired by the 1973 American horror film The Exorcist, it is the first installment of the 1920 film series, which was a commercial success. The film was also dubbed into Telugu and Tamil, under the title 1920 Gayathri. American entertainment publication Collider has considered it one of the greatest Indian horror films of all time. A sequel, 1920: The Evil Returns, was released in 2012 to mixed reviews and commercial success.

== Plot ==
In 1920 British India, Arjun Singh Rathod is a well-known architect who has gone against his wealthy Hindu family's wishes to marry a British Indian girl – Lisa. His family ambush his car en route to Bombay, assaulting him badly and setting the car on fire in an attempt to kill Lisa. Due to this, Arjun, once a deeply religious and devout Hindu, shuns his beliefs and abandons his family for his wife.

Meanwhile, in Palampur, a rich businessman has acquired a stately old manor and plans to turn it into a boutique hotel. However, his estate manager MK has difficulty in retaining an architect for the place as the two prior architects died under mysterious circumstances. Arjun wins the contract, so he and Lisa move into the manor as he begins his survey of the property.

Lisa begins experiencing strange noises and feels afraid. She inquires with Balwant, the caretaker, to confirm her suspicions, and he rebuffs her and hints that she may have imagined it. Arjun attributes her experiences to anxiety from their recent escape and the fact that the countryside is quieter than the city. When he visits MK, he points out there is a sealed room at the back of the manor he will need access to as he needs to survey every part of the house. The manager readily agrees and tells him he has full authority to do as he wishes within the house as the owner was wanting to start the renovations as soon as possible. Lisa in the meantime, explores the house and finds the sealed room but the door is now open – inside she discovers a library with a magnificent piano and a portrait of a beautiful woman in Indian royal attire. She plays the piano and is soon disturbed by the feeling of someone watching her. Later that evening she and Arjun argue when she finds the room is sealed again and he refuses to believe her description of the room.

Balwant feels it is dangerous to allow people into the manor due to the prior deaths. He accuses MK of being aware of the manor's dark secrets as he refuses to visit the house due to his own fears, but MK threatens to fire him and buys his silence on the matter.

Lisa, in an attempt to gain solace, visits the village church where she befriends Father Thomas. Confiding her worries and fears in him, Father Thomas reassures her that he will come by the house to bless it. Meanwhile, Arjun has workers remove the doors of the library and is surprised that Lisa's description of the room was correct. Later that night, Lisa is tormented by an unknown spirit in the library where she sees the portrait has a name on the bottom – ‘Gayatri’.

The next day, Arjun leaves to survey the vast property for a few hours and Lisa has Father Thomas bless the house, during which he discovers the manor is cursed and has held on to its dark past. Later that night, Father Thomas is tormented by a spirit whispering in Latin. He rushes to the church archives where his colleague discovers the phrase means the house and its spirit are warning the church away.

Father Thomas rushes to the manor to warn the occupants but discovers Arjun has taken Lisa to Delhi for a few weeks for a high-profile meeting with the project suppliers. Father Thomas begs Balwant to pass on a message to Lisa and Arjun that it is dangerous for them to stay in the house, and he promises to do so. On the road to Delhi, Arjun's carriage is stopped by soldiers who inform them the roads are dangerous due to Indian rebel fighting with the British further down the road. As Arjun cannot afford to waste time, he leaves Lisa at home and proceeds with his trip with armed guards. Balwant does not pass on Father Thomas’ message when Lisa comes home, and she falls badly sick after a night of terrors. The church windows begin to bleed and Father Thomas fears Lisa is at great risk.

When Arjun comes home to his gravely ill wife, he enlists a doctor's help who urges him to get her admitted to the hospital. Father Thomas tries to tell Arjun that Lisa is possessed but he is doubted – at the hospital Lisa's condition worsens as the spirit finally manifests itself. When the doctor and his staff attempt to sedate her, the spirit informs everyone of how the doctor raped his superior's young daughter by sedating her in that very room. Shaken by his secret being let out, the doctor agrees to let Arjun try religious methods to save Lisa. Arjun visits MK and forces him to tell him the truth – but as the owner had only purchased the property two years prior, MK can only give him the name of the prior caretaker – Radha, who left to live in Naya Nagar when the property ownership changed.

Arjun leaves Lisa in the care of church members and goes to Naya Nagar where he tracks down Radha, now an old woman. Radha reveals that the house was once owned by Rai Bahadur, a wealthy Indian of royal descent. In 1857 revolt when Radha was a child, he was away fighting the British, leaving his daughter Gayatri and her maid servants Kesar Ma and Radha to run the estate with two old male servants.

One night, the manor occupants are disturbed by screams and find a man in an Indian Army uniform, staggering around the property, badly wounded. He states his name is Mohan Kant and that he barely escaped the slaughter of his unit – one of the groups Gayatri's father was leading, where over 90 men died at the hands of the British. The family sympathise and dedicate their time to caring for him, believing he is a patriot. During this time, Mohan becomes infatuated with Gayatri's beauty and she grows close to him.

A few days later, Kesar Ma catches him secretly liaising with a British soldier during the night and confronts him. He kills and dumps her body in the well and lies to Gayatri that she has gone home to her village where a relative was badly ill. Gayatri becomes suspicious but is interrupted by Radha's terrified state. Following her to the well, they discover Kesar Ma's body. Gayatri then searches Mohan's belongings, discovering to her horror that he was a British spy who was responsible for the death of the unit as he leaked information to his commanding officer, betraying the Indian patriots while he was waiting to go undercover for his protection.

Gayatri sends Radha with the message to her father's outpost in order to get help, and chooses to stay behind to seduce Mohan to delay his departure. She consummates their acquaintance in the library long enough for her father to arrive with his troops and hang Mohan in the same room. He vows to haunt the manor awaiting her soul so he can take it with him to hell.

Rai Bahadur refuses to acknowledge his daughter's sacrifice, sealing the room and disowning her for bringing shame to the family by sleeping with a traitor – banishing her to her grandmother's where she dies unwed and alone on 18 November 1896. Arjun surmises that this was the same night that Lisa was born, deducing that Gayatri and his wife share the same soul hence Mohan's current obsession in possessing her, the spirit was attempting to kill Lisa in order to fulfil his vow. He ruminates on Lisa's experiences in the house with regret, stating that his wife tried telling him many times that something was wrong with the house, but he had rebuffed her fears as baseless and silly.

Father Thomas tells Arjun he now has less than 24 hours to oust the spirit as the next day was the new moon at which time the spirit would have full control of Lisa's soul thus killing her. He suggests an exorcism. The church refuses to authorise the procedure without the bishop's permission but this would be no earlier than two weeks by which time it would be too late. Father Thomas defies his superior's orders and proceeds with the ritual. During the exorcism, Balwant and Father Thomas die due to the strength of the spirit, Arjun takes up the process but is forced to re-evaluate his atheist stance in renouncing his faith. Finally he succeeds by using the Hanuman Chalisa. The spirit of Mohan is destroyed and Lisa is free.

Afterward, Arjun completes the project and he acknowledges his faith stating that Gayatri's soul was reborn looking for the love she was denied and now she and the manor are at peace.

== Cast ==
- Rajneesh Duggal as Arjun Singh Rathod (Voice dubbed by Viraj Adhav)
- Adah Sharma as Lisa Singh Rathod
- Anjori Alagh as Gayatri Devi (Cameo Appearance)
- Raj Zutshi as Father Thomas (Priest)
- Indraneil Sengupta as Sepahi Mohan Kant (the evil spirit), who was a traitor (Voice dubbed by Vikram Bhatt)
- Vipin Sharma as Balwanth, the caretaker
- Sri Vallabh Vyas as the Doctor
- Amin Hajee as M.K., the manager of the haunted manor
- Rakhi Sawant as Jumpa in an item song Bichua.
- Bob Brahmbhatt (guest appearance)

== Production ==
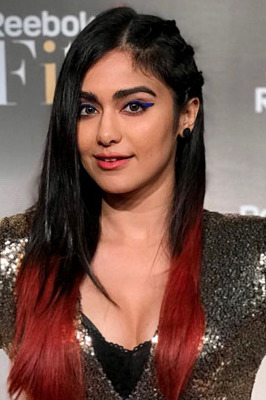
Sharma made her film debut with 1920.

Director Vikram Bhatt's previous films Aap Mujhe Achche Lagne Lage (2002), Deewane Huye Paagal (2005) and Life Mein Kabhie Kabhiee were termed as box-office failures in the media. Speaking in corroboration, Bhatt felt the need for introspection for making inconsequential cinema. His desire to make a horror film stemmed from the visuals of a chariot riding through the mist that constantly played in his mind. Claiming it to be his most ambitious project to date, Bhatt took a year and a half to complete the script, which was more powerful than his earlier film Raaz (2002).

Though Bhatt was looking to cast newcomers, he did not conduct any auditions for the film. Instead, when Rajneesh Duggal and Adah Sharma came to his office, his search for the lead cast ended. For their enthusiasm and efforts, Bhatt was delighted to work with them. Sharma found Bhatt to be a very calm, composed and patient director to work with. Duggal, who won the 2003 Mr. India title, was a New Delhi-based model in the fashion industry. While filming, both of them felt quite comfortable working with each other.

For scouting for an appropriate location for filming, the production house hired six location managers who visited about 12 countries over a period of six months before settling down on Allerton Castle, North Yorkshire, England. When Bhatt saw the images of this house, he was convinced that it would be the real protagonist of his film. This mansion was owned by a billionaire who lived with his wife, and he killed a carpenter. The carpenter's spirit is rumoured to be haunting the place. Bhatt and Sharma experienced an unusual incident while filming at this house. Inside the mansion, a huge portrait of the lady is hung on one of its walls. When they attempted to take a photograph of this portrait, the picture always came out blurred, no matter what angle they took it from.

One of the producers of the movie, Surendra Sharma, said "never has a supernatural thriller been attempted in a period setting and made at this scale." His father-cinematographer Pravin Bhatt and he decided to shoot in candlelight to recreate the conditions during the year of setting – 1920. At the same time, they hoped to fill every frame with artistry and create the eeriness of a cold haunting. Director Bhatt watched a lot of footage of true accounts of poltergeists and hauntings. In addition, he wanted to establish the same style of portraits of this period. To achieve this, instead of resorting to computer graphics, he asked Anjorie Alag, the supporting actress to pose for five hours in front of an artist. The entire shoot was completed in a 12-hour night shift for 18 days during the winter.

To further enhance the effect of horror for this film, Ashoke Chowdhury and Indraneil Roy were hired to work on the visual effects. When they approached Bhatt and showed him samples of their previous work, they were hired with the instructions that he expected good, international quality work. During their work, the film was treated digitally using a specialized software. Using this, they were able to make glasses break and generate smoke. They made use of techniques such as chroma, rotoscoping and wire-rigs for levitation. One of their most challenging scenes in the film was to recreate Mumbai's Victoria Terminus as it was in 1920. This required them 40 days of work.

Several scenes within the movie are identical to scenes in The Exorcist, The Exorcism of Emily Rose, Stigmata and One Missed Call.

== Soundtrack ==
1920

Soundtrack album by Adnan Sami
- Released: 12 September 2008 (Film)
- Recorded: 2008
- Studio: Big Music T-Series Studio
- Genre: Feature Film soundtrack
- Length: 36:34
- Language: Hindi
- Label: T-Series
- Producer: Bhushan Kumar

The music of the film was composed by Adnan Sami. Sameer penned the lyrics. Pandit Jasraj, Shubha Mudgal, Parveen Sultana, Asha Bhosle and Kailash Kher feature in the soundtrack.

All tracks are written by Sameer.

No.	Title	Singer(s)	Length
1.	"Vaada Tumse Hain Vaada"	Pandit Jasraj	6:26
2.	"Bichua"	Shubha Mudgal	5:17
3.	"Tujhe Main Pyar Karu"	Kailash Kher	5:11
4.	"Aise Jalta Hai Jiya"	Asha Bhosle	5:29
5.	"Vaada Tumse Hain Vaada (Female)"	Parveen Sultana	6:22
6.	"1920 Theme"	Parveen Sultana	2:18
7.	"Bichua - Remix"	Shubha Mudgal	4:21
Total length:			36:34

== Release ==
A coffee-table book, with trivia and in-depth details about the film, was launched prior to the film's release. Bhatt thought that the audience will find it better to read about the film before its release. The film was released on 12 September 2008.

=== Critical reception ===
The film gained mixed reviews from critics. Nikhat Kazmi of The Times of India commented that Adah Sharma "delivers a consummate performance". Ashok Nayak from nowrunning.com wrote: "1920 doesn't manage to hold your attention throughout. It's scary in parts and funny at times. Don't expect much at the box-office".

=== Box office ===
1920 grossed ₹5.84 crore in its first week. It grossed ₹2.67 crore and ₹1.52 in second and third weeks respectively, thus collecting ₹14.50 crore in total.

== Sequels ==
As of 2023, 1920 has spawned four follow-up films:

- 1920: Evil Returns (2012)
- 1920 London (2016)
- 1921 (2018)
- 1920: Horrors of the Heart (2023)
