= Neetha Shetty =

Indian television actress

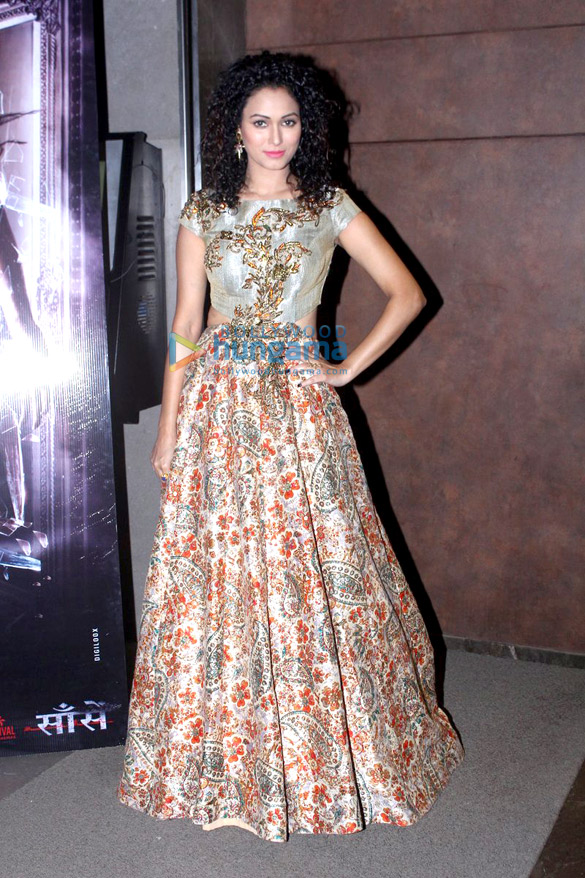
- Neetha Shetty in 2016
- Born: June 20, 1986 (age 40); Bengaluru, Karnataka, India
- Occupation: Actress
- Years active: 2004–present
- Known for: Pyaar Kii Ye Ek Kahaani; No Entry

Neetha Shetty is an Indian television actress. She has starred in Ghar Ki Lakshmi Betiyann as Gauri, one of the Garodia sisters, and in Kahin to Hoga as Dr. Archita.

== Career ==
Neetha has played the role of Sanjana in Mamta. She has also acted in Banoo Main Teri Dulhan as Dr. Shivani, and in Tum Bin Jaaoon Kahaan as Khushi. In 2018, Neetha starred in the Season 1 of Gandii Baat.

== Television ==
Year	Title	Role	Notes
2004–2005	Tum Bin Jaaoon Kahaan	Khushi Mehra/Khushi Aryan Rajsingh	
2005	Raat Hone Ko Hai	Episode 189 – Episode 192	
2005	Raat Hone Ko Hai	Episode 221 – Episode 224	
2005–2006	Kahiin To Hoga	Dr. Archita	
2006	Vaidehi	Natasha Jaisingh	
2006–2007	Ghar Ki Lakshmi Betiyann	Gauri Garodia	
2007	Mano Ya Na Mano	Priyanka (Episode 58)	
2007	Banoo Main Teri Dulhann	Dr. Shivani	
2007	Mamta	Sanjana	
2008	Ssshhhh...Phir Koi Hai	Episode 98 & Episode 99	
2008	Ssshhhh...Phir Koi Hai	Yamini (Episode 102 & Episode 103)	
2008	Parrivaar – Kartavya Ki Pariksha	Urvashi Swapnil Nerulkar	
2009	Ek Din Achanak	Priya	
2010	Bairi Piya	Surbhi Nirbhay Pundir	
2010	Keshav Pandit		
2010	Pyaar Kii Ye Ek Kahaani	Sugandh Jaiswal	
2010–2011	Shorr	Aatma	
2011–2017	C.I.D	Vishaka (Episode 698); Roopa (Episode 785); Kamya Kumar (Episode 806); Abhishta (Episode 1135 & 1136); Neha (Episode 1269); Alisha (Episode 1321); Mallika (Episode 1334); Malini (Episode 1424)	
2011	Dhoondh Legi Manzil Humein	Aarti	
2012	Savdhaan India	Sheetal (Episode 220) Veena Ghanshyam Chaurasia (Episode 358) Bharti (Episode 467) Rati (Episode 601) Advocate Ketki Diwan/Madhu (Episode 664) Rashi Pawar (Episode 692) Sanjana (Episode 729) Kkusum (Episode 851) Jyoti Pandey (Episode 979) Nirali (Episode 1271) Devi, Bengali housewife (Episode 2130)	
2014	Emotional Atyachar	Simran	
2014	Sasural Simar Ka	Aditi/Sunaina Vikrant Mehta	
2014–2015	Siyaasat	Manbhawati Bai	
2015	Doli Armaano Ki	Kiran	
2017	Peshwa Bajirao	Savitri Bai	
2017–2018	Rudra Ke Rakshak	Nagin	
2017–2018	Bhutu	Mansi Randhawa	
2018	Meri Hanikarak Biwi	Gulki	
2018	Paramavatar Shri Krishna	Goddess Yogmaya	
2018	Kaun Hai?	Malini (Episode 1)	
2018	Kaun Hai?	Anandi (Episode 34 – Episode 41)	
2018	Baby Come Naa	Mona	
2019	Laal Ishq	Manika (Episode 53)	
2019–2020	Tenali Rama	Maharani Sulakshana	
2020–2021	Dwarkadheesh Bhagwaan Shree Krishn - Sarvkala Sampann	Maharani Rukmini	
2021	Bigg Boss Marathi (season 3)	Wild card contestant	
2022	Dharm Yoddha Garud	Devi Lakshmi	
2022	Yeh Hai Chahatein	Mayuri Ahuja	
2023	Mann Sundar	Monica Khanna	
2023–2024	Aangan – Aapno Kaa	Deepika "Deepu" Sharma	
2024	Nath – Rishton Ki Agnipariksha	Mantra Pratap Singh	
2025	Ghum Hai Kisikey Pyaar Meiin	Manjari Pradhan	
2025	Ganesh Kartikey	Goddess Lakshmi	
2026	Gharwali Pedwali	Sheena	
2026	Divya Prem - Pyaar aur Rahasya Ki Kahaani	Saaya	

== Filmography ==
Year	Film	Role	Notes
2005	No Entry	Preeti Sachdev	Special appearance
2016	Saansein	Tanya	
2016	Fugay	Kamini	Marathi film
2017	Tula Kalnnaar Nahi	Menaka	Marathi film

== Web series ==
Year	Show	Role	Channel	Notes
2018	Gandii Baat	Gunja	ALTBalaji	S01E01

== Music ==
Year	Song	Singer	Language	Notes
2017	Rangreziya	Javed Ali	Hindi	
