= Meera (2009 TV series) =

Indian historical drama TV series in Hindi language

- Created by: Meenakshi Sagar; Amrit Sagar
- Written by: Dialogues; Vinod Sharma; Mriduta Sharma
- Screenplay by: Vipul Mehta/Meenakshi Sagar/Viral Shah
- Directed by: Mukesh Singh; Swapnil Mahaling
- Starring: See below
- Music by: Sunny Bawra; Inder Bawra
- Opening theme: "Chor Sab Sakhiyon Saheli" by Sunny Bawra and Inder Bawra or
- Country of origin: India
- Original language: Hindi
- No. of episodes: 135

Production
- Producer: Sagar Pictures
- Cinematography: Ankit Chouksey
- Editors: Santosh Singh; Janak Chauhan
- Camera setup: Multi-camera
- Running time: Approximately 24 minutes

Original release
- Network: NDTV Imagine
- Release: 27 July 2009 – 29 January 2010

Meera - Krishna Se Laagi Aisi Lagan Ek Rajkuvri Bani Jogan is an Indian historical drama television series produced by Sagar Pictures and written by Vipul Mehta. It is based on the life of Meera Bai, a 15th-century Hindu mystic and poet whose lyrical songs of devotion to the god Krishna are widely popular in northern India. The series, aired on NDTV Imagine from 27 July 2009 till 29 January 2010.

== Synopsis ==
Meera, the great poet saint, was born a princess in Khudki in Rajasthan in the early 16th century. Her father was Ratan Singh — the youngest son of Rao Dooda, the then ruler of Merta a small state in Marwar. From the time of her birth, it was predicted by Raidasji (a great saint) that Meera was meant for greater things and that her family would be known in through the decades because of her achievements.

When Meera is about 8–9 years old she wants a Gudda (doll) whom she can marry. Saint Raidas-ji gives her Lord Krishna's idol, and Meera immediately falls in love with the Lord. Meera truly believes that the Lord is her husband.

Soon after, her marriage is fixed with Bhoj Raj, the son of Rana Sangha of Chittor. But in her mind, Meera remains married to the Lord and never accepts the prince as her husband. After marriage her life is engulfed in turmoil, due to few understanding her devotion and faith towards Lord Krishna. She is soft-spoken, mild-mannered, gifted, sweet and she sings with a melodious voice. She is one of the foremost exponents of the Prema Bhakti (Divine Love) and an inspired poet.

Through this show, the attempt to portray Meera's story is as that of an ordinary Rajput princess whose ultimate love and devotion to the Lord led her to question the set norms of the patriarchal society. It is a story relevant even in today's day and age as Meera embodies a woman's true love and her ultimate sacrifice to remain loyal to that love even in the face of social stigma and opposition. A story of unquestioning and pure love.

== Cast ==
- Aditi Sajwan as Mirabai
- Aashika Bhatia as young Mirabai
- Gauri Singh as Veer Kunwari: Meera's mother and Ratan Singh's wife
- Kunal Bakshi as Ratan Singh: Meera's father.
- Paras Arora as Jaimall: Meera's cousin brother
- Shreya Laheri as Lalita: Meera's best friend since childhood
- Twara Desai as Lalita: Desai replaced Laheri
- Ravi Jhankal as Rao Doodaji: Meera's grandfather
- Abhilin Pandey as Bhoj Raj: Meera's husband
- Zeb Khan as Vikramaditya: Bhojraj's half brother
- Arvind Rao Suriya as Ravidas as Meera's spiritual Guru
- Prachee Pathak as Rani Kanwar Bai: Bhojraj's mother and Meera's mother-in-law
- Raza Murad as Rana Sanga: Bhojraj and Vikramaditya's father
