= Vishal Karwal =

Indian television actor

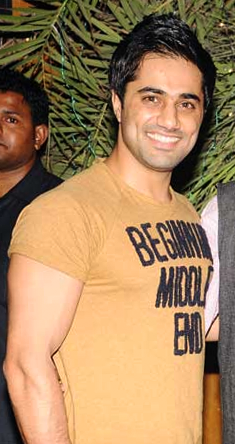
- Karwal in 2012
- Born: Palampur, Himachal Pradesh, India
- Occupation: Actor
- Years active: 2006–present
- Spouse: Heena Karwal (m. 2020)

Vishal Karwal is an Indian television-film actor. He has played some famous serials like Dwarkadheesh Bhagwaan Shree Krishn, Rishton Se Badi Pratha, Ek Hazaaron Mein Meri Behna Hai and Rangrasiya. He participated in MTV Roadies, MTV Splitsvilla and Bigg Boss. He has also appeared in a lead role in Vikram Bhatt's horror thriller 1920 London in 2016.

== Early life ==
Vishal Karwal was born in Himachal Pradesh, India, in a Punjabi family. His father owned a store that dealt with jewelry and precious stones and was a school chairman. His mother is a homemaker. He was raised in a joint family in Palampur, Himachal Pradesh. When he was 10 years old, he was admitted to a boarding school, Dalhousie Public School, in Dalhousie, Himachal Pradesh. He studied for a Bachelor of Engineering to become a computer science engineer. He is also a trained commercial pilot, completing a pilot training course from Texas, United States, in October 2008.

== Career ==
=== Television debut and MTV Roadies (2006–2008) ===
Karwal began his career in 2006 by auditioning with the youth entertainment adventure reality TV show MTV Roadies 4, which aired on MTV India and later got selected and participated in. He was voted out of the show in episode 4. In 2007, he played an episodic appearance in Crime Patrol as Varun. In 2008, he participated in the first season of the youth reality show MTV Splitsvilla, where he emerged as the winner along with Shraddha Haribhai. He later presented a reality show on MTV India called Couplesutra in 2009.

=== Acting debut (2009–2011) ===
Karwal made his acting debut in 2009 with a daily soap, Sabki Jodi Wohi Banata Bhagyavidhaata, playing the lead as Vinay opposite Richa Soni. However, he quit the show in 2010 as it took a 15-year leap, and he didn't want to portray an older character. In October 2010, after leaving his previous show, Karwal was cast to be in Rishton Se Badi...Pratha and played the lead in the daily soap as Abhay. He replaced Gaurav Chaudhary, who was replaced even before the series premiered. The show went on air in November 2010. The TV series attempted to highlight social events inspired by real-life incidents. He later decided to quit the show as it was heading for a leap, but before this could happen, the show ended in May 2011.

Karwal was next seen on Imagine TV's TV program, Dwarkadheesh – Bhagwaan Shree Krishn, based on the famous Indian history Mahabharata, where he played the lead role of the Hindu gid Krishna. The series was telecast from July 2011 onwards. Vishal revealed, "This show got me into acting. I loved doing the show and started enjoying acting."

=== Punjabi Films and Bigg Boss (2012–2015) ===
In May 2012, Karwal made his debut in the Punjabi film industry with Aappan Pher Milange, in which he starred alongside Gracy Singh. At a promotional event for the film, he said, "After doing television, I wanted to stretch my horizons. Punjabi films are an excellent medium for doing so. The way its reach grows, it should be giving competition to Bollywood very soon." The film, however, failed at the box office.

In November 2012, he participated in the reality show Bigg Boss 6. He entered as a wild card contestant. Before entering the Bigg Boss show, he said in an interview, "Being a part of Bigg Boss is a big thing. This reality show is unique and more interesting than other reality shows." He was voted out of the show in December 2012 after spending about 40 days in the Bigg Boss house, and he said in an interview with PTI, "I was not expecting to be evicted. I wanted to stay on the show longer." However, during the show, he was shown as not actively participating in game-related politics, fights, or tasks; instead, he mostly reserved himself to lying on the sunbed. Nonetheless, his interest in a co-contestant, Sana Khan, gained some curiosity from the viewers.

In February 2013, Karwal appeared in the comedy show Nautanki - The Comedy Theatre. In May 2013, he replaced Akshay Dogra and played the role of Devender in Ek Hazaaron Mein Meri Behna Hai.

Karwal has emphasized that he likes to do different roles on TV, where he can do something new with each role. He said, "The element of freshness in doing different things interests me. Also, I like to experiment with what I do because otherwise, doing only one serial gets monotonous." In 2014, Karwal was roped in for the daily soap Rangrasiya opposite Sanaya Irani, portraying the negative role of Shantanu in the series. His role was appreciated by TV viewers. His role ended in July 2014 as the show headed for a 7-year leap.

In August 2014, Karwal acted in a short film titled Shaadi Vaadi And All That as Karan Jaitley. In November 2014, Karwal portrayed the character of Rajveer Singh Ranawat, one of the primary antagonists in the show Jamai Raja on Zee TV alongside Nia Sharma and Ravi Dubey. He left the show in April 2015. In December 2014, he participated in the Box Cricket League as a contestant, where he was in the team Chandigarh Cubs which was owned by Shiv Panditt.

In May 2015, Karwal played a small role in Zee TV's Kumkum Bhagya as Shahid. In August 2015, he participated as a contestant in Jhalak Dikhhla Jaa 8. He entered as a wild card entrant and was paired alongside choreographer Shampa Gopikrishna. He got eliminated within a week, where judges decided not to select him to go ahead in the competition. In September 2015, he made a cameo appearance in Ekta Kapoor's Yeh Hai Mohabbatein as Arjit.

=== Further success and Bollywood debut (2016–2018) ===
In March 2016, Karwal acted in a short film, Sexaholic, as Amit opposite Shama Sikander. He later made his Bollywood debut with Vikram Bhatt 's horror thriller 1920 London, following the successful series of 1920 (film series), co-starring Sharman Joshi and Meera Chopra in the pivotal roles. He played the role of Veer Singh, a possessed husband of Shivangi (played by Meera). The film was released on 6 May 2016.

In August 2016, Karwal acted as Krishna in the mythological series Naagarjuna – Ek Yoddha. He then played a negative role in the daily soap Kalash – Ek Vishwaas as Rajdeep and left the series in January 2017.

In 2017, he acted as Vishnu in another mythological series, Paramavatar Shri Krishna. He quit the series in 2018 due to disagreements with the production team. He said, “I was shooting only for a couple of days every month for almost a year. I had initially blocked eight days per month for the show, which was later reduced to six. However, when the time came to renew the contract, the production house and I weren’t on the same page. So, I preferred to put in my papers and move on.” He was replaced by Himanshu Malhotra.

In 2018, Karwal played Karan in the daily soap Yeh Rishta Kya Kehlata Hai. The public appreciated his role, which ended later that year.

=== Naagin 3 and Beyond (2019–present) ===
In 2019, Karwal acted in the film Dosti Ke Side Effects as Sahil. Later, in May 2019, he played a cameo in the successful supernatural series Naagin 3 as Ahaan.

In June 2019, Karwal appeared in the sequel of the 2011 mythological series, Dwarkadheesh Bhagwan Shree Krishn – Sarvkala Sampann reprising his role of Krishna. In 2020, he played another cameo appearance in the daily series Pandya Store as Armaan. However, his role was scrapped later due to the COVID-19 pandemic in December 2020. In 2021, Karwal acted as Shahrukh in the daily soap Sasural Simar Ka 2.

=== Business plans ===
About his future plans, he told Deccan Chronicle in November 2012, "I have a couple of Punjabi films lined up and a few serial projects as well." He called this venture his dream project and acknowledged, "I cannot depend on acting forever; there has to be something else to bank upon."

== Personal life ==
In an interview with The Times of India, he said, "If not an actor, I would have been a pilot. I still miss flying," and further added, "Hopefully, I will get to convert my American flying license to the Indian license soon so that I will fly once again." Vishal is also a fitness freak. On the TV show Bigg Boss, he said, "I'm interested in fitness very much. I work out and run 3 miles every day." Vishal maintains that stardom is very temporary and that he leads a simple life. He acknowledged, "Till you are young and are bagging good roles, everyone wants to be associated with you. Once you are out of work, nobody really cares." He has a brother named Aditya Karwal and an older sister, Raima Karwal Luthra.

In October 2020, Karwal married Heena Suri.

== Filmography ==
=== Films ===
† denotes Film yet to be released

Year	Title	Role	Notes
2012	Aappan Pher Milange	Raj	Punjabi Film debut
2014	Shaadi Vaadi And All That	Karan Jaitely	
2016	Sexaholic	Amit	Short movie
2016	1920 London	Veer Singh	Bollywood debut

=== Television ===
Year	Name	Role	Notes	Ref
2006	MTV Roadies 4	Contestant	Eliminated	
2007	Crime Patrol	Varun		
2008	MTV Splitsvilla 1	Contestant	Winner	
2009–2010	Bhagyavidhaata	Vinay Sinha		
2010–2011	Rishton Se Badi Pratha	Abhay Markantay Suryavansh		
2011–2012	Dwarkadheesh - Bhagwaan Shree Krishn	Krishna		
2012	Bigg Boss 6	Contestant	Wild Card Entrant	
2013	Nautanki - The Comedy Theatre	Himself	Guest	
2013	Fear Factor...Khatron Se Takkar	Contestant		
2013	Ek Hazaaron Mein Meri Behna Hai	Devender Chaudhary		
2014	Rangrasiya	Shantanu Kumar		
2014	Encounter	Inspector Vikas Sawant		
2014–2015	Box Cricket League 1	Contestant	Player in Chandigarh Cubs	
2014–2015	Jamai Raja	Rajveer Singh Ranawat		
2015	Kumkum Bhagya	Shahid Riaz		
2015	Jhalak Dikhhla Jaa 8	Contestant		
2015	Yeh Hai Mohabbatein	Arjit		
2016	Naagarjuna – Ek Yoddha	Krishna		
2016	Kalash – Ek Vishwaas	Rajdeep		
2017–2018	Paramavatar Shri Krishna	Bhagwan Vishnu		
2018	Yeh Rishta Kya Kehlata Hai	Karan		
2019–2020	Dwarkadheesh Bhagwaan Shree Krishn - Sarvkala Sampann	Krishna		
2020	Pandya Store	Armaan		
2021	Sasural Simar Ka 2	Shahrukh		
2022	Swarn Swar Bharat	Bhagwan Vishnu	Cameo	
2022	Dharm Yoddha Garud	Lord Vishnu		
2022	Jai Hanuman - Sankat Mochan Naam Tiharo	Lord Vishnu		
2024-2025	shree tirupati balaji	Shrinivas/Krishna/vishnu	Hari om app	
