= Gautam Sharma =

Indian television and film actor

- Born: Bangalore, Karnataka, India
- Occupations: Model, actor
- Years active: 2009–Present

Gautam Sharma is an Indian television and film actor.

Sharma was raised in Bangalore. His father is a businessman. He completed his high school education from Frank Anthony Public School, Bangalore and graduated from St Joseph's College of Commerce, Bangalore.

He modelled before debuting with the show Grihasti, where he played a cameo role. He played the lead role in the television series Shakuntala. He played the role of Arjuna in Dwarkadheesh- Bhagwan Shree Krishn. He then played the role of Bablu Patel on Jamai Raja.

== Filmography ==
Television shows
Year	Title	Role	Notes	Ref.
2009	Grihasti	Cameo	Debut	
2009	Shakuntala	Dushyanta		
2011	Dwarkadheesh – Bhagwaan Shree Krishn	Arjuna		
2014	Jamai Raja	Bablu Patel		
