= Shaandaar (2015 film) =

2015 Indian film by Vikas Bahl

- Theatrical release poster
- Directed by: Vikas Bahl
- Written by: Anvita Dutt Guptan
- Story by: Vikas Bahl; Chaitally Parmar
- Produced by: Anurag Kashyap; Vikramaditya Motwane; Karan Johar; Madhu Mantena
- Starring: Shahid Kapoor; Alia Bhatt
- Cinematography: Anil Mehta
- Edited by: Sanchari Das Mollick
- Music by: Amit Trivedi
- Production companies: Phantom Films; Dharma Productions
- Distributed by: Fox Star Studios
- Release date: 22 October 2015
- Running time: 144 minutes
- Country: India
- Language: Hindi
- Budget: ₹600 million
- Box office: est. ₹597 million

Shaandaar (transl. Magnificent) is a 2015 Indian Hindi-language romantic comedy film directed by Vikas Bahl and produced by Anurag Kashyap and Vikramaditya Motwane. It stars Shahid Kapoor and Alia Bhatt in lead roles, with Pankaj Kapur and Sanjay Kapoor in supporting roles. Principal photography began in August 2014 in Leeds, and the film was released on 22 October 2015. The film received highly negative reviews and became a box-office bomb.

Shaandaar marks Shahid Kapoor's first on-screen collaboration with his father, Pankaj Kapur, and sister, Sanah Kapur, who portray Bhatt's father and sister, respectively, as well as the father-son duo's maiden and only to-date collaboration with Dharma Productions.

== Plot ==
Alia Arora is an insomniac orphan adopted by Bipin Arora, whose wife Geetu Arora and mother Kamla Arora are extremely business-minded and greedy. Alia is ignored by both Geetu and Kamla but deeply loved by Bipin as well as his biological daughter, Isha. Since Alia is unable to sleep, Bipin draws her a dream every night before going to bed, hoping it will encourage her to sleep.

With Isha set to get married at a destination wedding in London, the family drives to the wedding venue. On the way, Bipin's car is hit by Jagjinder Joginder (aka JJ) driving his motorcycle, leading to a comical altercation between them. It is later revealed that JJ is the event manager for Isha's wedding. The marriage is arranged between the Aroras and the Fundwanis, a family headed by Mr. Harry Fundwani, the groom's elder brother. The Aroras need the marriage to occur as they have gone bankrupt and are hoping to access the money of the seemingly wealthy Fundwanis. The groom, Robin Fundwani, is fitness-obsessed and vain; he looks at Isha with contempt because of her weight and love of food. It is evident that he is getting married only at the behest of his elder brother.

Through some magical and funny moments, Alia and JJ (also an insomniac due to losing his parents in anti-Sikh riots) become romantically interested in one another, eventually curing each other's insomnia and falling asleep together. Bipin who is very protective of Alia tries to separate the couple leading to several comic moments. This leads to him inadvertently revealing that Alia is his biological daughter with his ex-girlfriend, whom he briefly dated before marrying Geetu under family pressure. Under the coaxing of Isha and after observing the couple, Bipin begins to slowly accept JJ and Alia's relationship.

Isha becomes increasingly upset with Robin, who escalates this friction by insulting her weight and making fun of her. Although the Aroras are bothered by Robin's treatment of Isha, they turn a blind eye to it to avoid any disruptions to their business deal with the Fundwanis. Before the wedding, Kamla, the matriarch of the Aroras, during an argument with her younger son, sneezes and dies, which threatens to derail the wedding. The Aroras, desperate for the wedding to carry on, pretend she is still alive.

Isha arrives at the wedding dais ready to marry Robin for her family's sake. But when Robin begins to laugh at her after her dress rips during the ceremony, she decides not to get married, and her speech inspires everyone to believe in themselves and their self-worth. Frustrated, Mr. Fundwani tries to physically force the marriage to continue by holding everyone at gunpoint, and it is revealed that the Fundwanis are also bankrupt. JJ, Alia, Bipin, Isha, and Robin escape from the scene and fly away in a helicopter.

== Cast ==
- Shahid Kapoor as Jagjinder Joginder (JJ)
- Alia Bhatt as Alia Arora
- Sanah Kapur as Isha Arora
- Vikas Verma as Robin Fundwani
- Shibani Dandekar as Sonia
- Pankaj Kapur as Bipin Arora
- Sanjay Kapoor as Harry Fundwani
- Anjana Sukhani as Mrs. Fundwani
- Niki Aneja Walia as Geetu Arora
- Sushma Seth as Kamla Arora
- Tessa Vellara and Teena Vellara as the Twins
- Shalini Chandran as Relative
- Hagupreet Singh as Robin's friend
- Kumud Pant as Business Wedding Guest

Cameo appearance

- Karan Johar as himself who host his show Mehendi with Karan

== Critical reception ==
Deepanjana Pal at Firstpost described the writing as sloppy, commenting that, "it's more a series of YouTube sketches than a proper story." Indian Express felt that Kapoor's character Jagjinder Joginder was "badly-written", noting, "He can be such a natural charmer, but here the charm offensive is not allowed to stop, and finally just overtakes him." Saibal Chatterjee of NDTV, felt that while there were "flashes of smart writing", that there was also "[a lack] of sustained narrative force, especially in the second half". Chatterjee described the interaction between Kapoor and Bhatt as "spontaneous chemistry", an opinion that was not shared by the Indian Express reviewer, who wrote, "Shahid and Alia look good together, but there's not very much else they manage between the two of them."

Ibnlive described the movie as "The film is bizarre and wildly inconsistent". India TV stated "There is nothing Shaandaar about this Shahid-Alia starrer". TimesofIndia gave two stars to the film.

== Soundtrack ==
Shaandaar

Soundtrack album by Amit Trivedi
- Released: 24 September 2015
- Recorded: 2015
- Genre: Feature film soundtrack
- Length: 32:06
- Language: Hindi
- Label: Zee Music Company
- Producer: Amit Trivedi

Singles from Shaandaar
- 1. "Gulaabo" Released: 10 September 2015; 2. "Shaam Shaandaar" Released: 16 September 2015

The music for the film is composed by Amit Trivedi. The first song titled, "Gulaabo" was released on 10 September 2015, followed by "Shaam Shaandaar" which was released on 16 September 2015. The music rights for the film have been acquired by Zee Music Company. The full audio album was released on 24 September 2015.

No.	Title	Lyrics	Singer(s)	Length
1.	"Gulaabo"	Anvita Dutt	Amit Trivedi, Vishal Dadlani, Anusha Mani	04:24
2.	"Shaam Shaandaar"	Amitabh Bhattacharya	Amit Trivedi	03:57
3.	"Nazdeekiyaan"	Amitabh Bhattacharya	Nikhil Paul George, Neeti Mohan	03:26
4.	"Senti Wali Mental"	Amitabh Bhattacharya	Arijit Singh, Amit Trivedi, Swanand Kirkire, Neeti Mohan	09:02
5.	"Raitaa Phailgaya"	Amitabh Bhattacharya	Amit Trivedi, Divya Kumar	03:55
6.	"Neend Na Mujhko Aaye"	P L Santoshi	Siddharth Basrur, Saba Azad	04:16
7.	"Eena Meena Deeka"	Rajender Krishan	Amit Trivedi & Rachel Varghese	03:06
Total length:				32:06

== Sequel ==
In mid-2024, There were plans to have a sequel of the movie Shaandaar titled Shaandaar 2 which is still in development

== Box office ==
The opening day collection was ₹11 million (US$110,000). After taking a good opening the collections dropped but the overseas collection were good and first five-day collections were ₹900 million (US$9.3 million). After 16 days in theatres, the worldwide collection was estimated as ₹597 million (US$6.2 million). The film was declared as a box-office failure after a full run in theatres. The success of Pyaar Ka Punchnama 2 was considered to add to the film's failure.
