= Parul Chauhan =

Indian model and actress

Parul Chauhan Thakkar
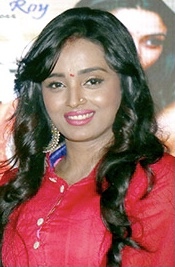
- Chauhan in 2016
- Born: Parul Chauhan; Kesriganj, Sitapur district, Uttar Pradesh, India
- Occupations: Television actress; model
- Years active: 2007–present
- Spouse: Chirag Thakkar (m. 2018)

Parul Chauhan Thakkar is an Indian television actress. She is known for her portrayal as Ragini Sharma in Sapna Babul Ka...Bidaai and Swarna Goenka in Yeh Rishta Kya Kehlata Hai. Before venturing into acting, she did modelling. In 2009, she participated as a contestant in the reality series Jhalak Dikhhla Jaa 3.

== Career ==
Chauhan started her career playing the lead role of Ragini Ranvir Rajvansh in the show Sapna Babul Ka...Bidaai from 2007 to 2010. In 2009, Parul then participated in Jhalak Dikhhla Jaa Season 3.

In 2010, she replaced Shalini Chandran as the lead in the television series Rishton Se Badi Pratha. She was seen in shows like Punar Vivah - Ek Nayi Umeed, Meri Aashiqui Tumse Hi. From 2016 to 2019, Chauhan played the pivotal role of Swarna Gupta Goenka (male lead - Kartik's step-mother) in Yeh Rishta Kya Kehlata Hai.

== Television ==
Year	Title	Role	Notes	Ref.
2006	Kahiin To Hoga	Receptionist	Cameo	
2007–2010	Sapna Babul Ka... Bidaai	Ragini Rajvansh/Sareen (née Sharma)	Lead role	
2007	Kasautii Zindagii Kay	Ragini Rajvansh/Sareen (née Sharma)	Guest appearance	
2008	Jo Jeeta Wohi Super Star	Ragini Rajvansh/Sareen (née Sharma)	Guest appearance	
2008	Kya Aap Paanchvi Pass Se Tez Hain?	Ragini Rajvansh/Sareen (née Sharma)	Guest appearance	
2008	Kis Desh Mein Hai Meraa Dil	Ragini Rajvansh/Sareen (née Sharma)	Guest appearance	
2009	Perfect Bride	Ragini Rajvansh/Sareen (née Sharma)	Guest appearance	
2009	Jhalak Dikhhla Jaa 3	Contestant	8th place	
2010	Saath Nibhaana Saathiya	Ragini	Special appearance	
2010	Zara Nachke Dikha	Ragini	Guest appearance	
2010–2011	Rishton Se Badi Pratha	Surbhi Abhay Suryavanshi		
2011	Geet – Hui Sabse Parayi	Herself	Dance performance	
2012	Amrit Manthan	Herself	Guest appearance	
2012	Savdhaan India	Ameesha		
2012–2013	BIG Memsaab	Presenter	Seasons 6-7	
2013	Punar Vivah - Ek Nayi Umeed	Divya Raj Jakhotia		
2014–2015	Box Cricket League	Contestant		
2015–2016	Meri Aashiqui Tum Se Hi	Aarti Singh Ahlawat		
2016–2019	Yeh Rishta Kya Kehlata Hai	Swarna Gupta Goenka		
2018	When Obama Loved Osama			
2022	Dharm Yoddha Garud	Queen Rani Kadru		
2024	Mil Ke Bhi Hum Na Mile	Kashmira		

== Personal life ==
Chauhan was born in Kesriganj, Sitapur district, and later moved with her family to Singhai near the Nepal border. She completed her early education in Lakhimpur Kheri before relocating to Mumbai to pursue her career. On 12 December 2018, Chauhan married Chirag Thakkar.

== Awards ==
Year	Award	Category	Work	Result	Ref.
2008	Indian Telly Awards	Best Actress In Lead Role	Sapna Babul Ka...Bidaai	Won	
2008	Indian Television Academy Awards	Best Actress (Popular)	Sapna Babul Ka...Bidaai	Won	
2018	Gold Awards	Best Supporting Actor- Female	Yeh Rishta Kya Kehlata Hai	Won	
