= Grihasti =

- Created by: Sphere Origins
- Written by: Purnendu Shekhar; Damini Kanwal Shetty
- Directed by: Mohit Hussain; Ravi Raj; Praddep Yadav
- Creative director: Nimisha Pandey
- Starring: See Below
- Opening theme: "Grihasti" by Pamela Jain & Khushbu Jain
- Country of origin: India
- Original language: Hindi
- No. of episodes: 285

Production
- Producers: Sanjoy Wadhwa; Comall Wadhwa; Damini Kanwal Shetty
- Running time: 24 minutes
- Production company: Sphere Origins

Original release
- Network: StarPlus
- Release: 25 February 2008 – 27 March 2009

Grihasti is a family drama produced by Sphere Origins, that aired on StarPlus during weekday afternoons. The show premiered on 25 February 2008 and aired until 27 March 2009.

== Synopsis ==
Grihasti is based upon the Khurana family. After the death of the family's patriarch, Balraaj, the women realize that they must come together to succeed in their male-dominated society. As a result of this and of destiny, the women become more independent. This change in their life shows the importance of many female roles in society: wife, daughter, grandmother, and sister. It is shown that Rishi (Simar's husband) is having an affair with his secretary Priya. Simar is getting a little doubtful.

The Balraaj family house is taken by the fraudulent Lucky Kapoor and his wife and mother. The Balraaj family are trying to get it back by playing Lucky's trick on him. They disguise themselves as potential buyers of their house and, in the end, they get it back on Holi. But on Holi Manas and Raunak get Rishi high on cannabis and he goes and hugs Priya. Then he tells Simar that he is having an affair. The whole family breaks down especially Simar. Simar finds out that she is pregnant; Priya tells Rishi. Lucky Kapoor comes out of jail and is determined to kill Raunak so he goes to the Balraj house. He gets into a fight with him. Soni interferes and ends up falling down the stairs. She loses a lot of blood so Priya donates her blood to her. She makes Rishi realise that he still loves Simar. So they get back together again.

Eight months later, Simar goes into labour and has a baby boy.

Two years later, Rano and Soni are pregnant and Simar's child is two. There is a problem at work so the daughters go solve it. Soni first goes into labour, then so does Rano. It is too late to go to the hospital so they have their children at home: two girls. Everyone is happy with their husbands, children and family. They name Rano's baby Rani and Soni's baby Khushi.

== Cast ==
- Kiran Kumar as Balraaj Khurana (Father Of Simar and Soni)
- Vaidehi Amrute as Amrit Balraaj Khurana (Mother Of Simar and Soni)
- Khushbu as Simar Khurana (Elder Daughter Of Balraaj & Amrit Khurana, married to Rishi)
- Hunar Hali as Soni Khurana (Younger Daughter Of Balraaj & Amrit Khurana, married to Raunak)
- Arti Singh as Rano Manas Ahuja (Daughter Of Nacho, married to Manas)
- Sunila Karambekar as Nacho (Widowed Sister Of Balraaj)
- Akshat Gupta as Inspector Karan
- Akshay Sethi as Raunak (Soni's Husband)
- Anand Suryavanshi as Rishi (Simar's Husband)
- Shahbaz Khan as Jaydev Khurana (Elder Brother Of Balraaj Khurana)
- Sachin Shroff as Inspector Karan
- Shaleen Bhanot as Manas Ahuja (Rano's Husband)
- Dev Keswani as Raunak (Soni's Husband)
- Simple Kaul
- Gautam Sharma
- Sulakshana Khatri as Teji

== Production ==
In November 2008, the shootings and telecast of all the Hindi television series including this series and films were stalled on 8 November 2008 due to dispute by the technician workers of FWICE (Federation of Western India Cine Employees) for increasing the wages, better work conditions and more breaks between shootings. FWICE first took a strike on 1 October 2008 when they addressed their problems with the producers and production was stalled. A contract was signed after four days discussions and shooting were happening only for two hours content in a day then after which differences increased between them while channels gave them time until 30 October 2008 to sort it out. Failing to do so lead to protests again from 10 November 2008 to 19 November 2008 during which channels blacked out new broadcasts and repeat telecasts were shown from 10 November 2008. On 19 November 2008, the strike was called off after settling the disputes and the production resumed. The new episodes started to telecast from 1 December 2008.
