= Paramavatar Shri Krishna =

Indian mythological television series

- Genre: Mythological; drama
- Written by: C. L. Saini
- Directed by: Rahul Lingayat; Vaibhav Mutha; Deepak Sagar; Santosh Badal; Surajj Rao
- Creative directors: Alind Srivastava; Nisser Parvej
- Starring: Nirnay Samadhiya; Sudeep Sahir; Mahi Soni; Barkha Sengupta; Hunar Hali; Vishal Karwal; Gulki Joshi; Gungun Uprari; Rahul Jat; Manish Wadhwa
- Country of origin: India
- Original language: Hindi
- No. of episodes: 673

Production
- Producers: Alind Srivastava; Nisser Parvej
- Camera setup: Multi-camera
- Running time: 21 minutes
- Production company: Peninsula Pictures

Original release
- Network: And TV
- Release: 19 June 2017 – 17 January 2020

Paramavatar Shri Krishna (English: Lord Krishna) is an Indian historical television serial that aired on And TV from 19 June 2017 to 17 January 2020. It is based on the life of the Hindu deity Krishna, the eighth avatar of Vishnu.

== Synopsis ==
The story revolves around the birth and life of Krishna, the central character of the Hindu epic Mahabharata.

== Cast and characters ==
Main

- Sudeep Sahir as Krishna
  - Abhishek Nigam as Teen Krishna
  - Nirnay Samadhiya as Child Krishna
- Amandeep Sidhu / Hunar Hali as Rukmani / Sita
- Mahi Soni as Child Radha
  - Siddhiksha Singha as Baby Radha
- Tushar Chawla as Balram
  - Aryavart Mishra as Child Balram
- Gulki Joshi as Mata Devaki
- Chaitanya Choudhury as Vasudeva
- Tiya Gandwani as Rohini
- Gungun Uprari as Mata Yashoda
- Sachin Shroff as Nanda Baba
- Manish Wadhwa as Kans

Recurring

- Barkha Sengupta as Draupadi
- Ankit Bathla as Arjuna
- Neel Motwani as Karna
- Danish Akhtar Saifi as Bhima
- Vishal Karwal / Himanshu Malhotra as Vishnu
- Neha Sargam as Lakshmi / Durga
- Tarun Khanna / Diwakar Pundir as Shiva
- Dharti Bhatt as Parvati
- Deepak Jethi as Shridhar
- Hemant Choudhary / Chetanya Adib as Parashurama
- Ram Awana / Gireesh Sahdev as Maharaj Bali
- Neetha Shetty as Yogamaya
- Puneet Issar / Raj Premi as Jarasandha
- Gurpreet Bedi as Kesani
- Krutika Desai Khan as Chandalni
- Shresth Kumar as Paundraka Vasudeva
- Dakssh Ajit Singh as Shishupala
- Jiten Lalwani as Shani
- Vinod Kapoor as Dronacharya
- Amit Dolawat as Shikhandini
- Shagun Sharma as Satyabhama
- Daya Shankar Pandey as Sudama
- Aishwarya Raj Bhakuni as Subhrata

== See also ==
- Baal Krishna
- Jai Shri Krishna
