= Vicky Batra =

Indian television actor

- Occupation: Actor
- Years active: 2009–present

Vicky Batra is an Indian television actor. He appeared in one episode of Sony TV's Adaalat and played the role of Sujamal in Zee TV's series Jodha Akbar.

== Television ==
Year	Serial	Character
2009	Shakuntala	Rajkumar Mritunjaya
2012	Devon Ke Dev...Mahadev	Chandra
2013-15	Jodha Akbar	Rajkumar Sujamal
2014	SuperCops vs Supervillains	Treeman
2015	Suryaputra Karn	Dhrishtadyumna

2016

|-Fearfiles |. Rahul
