= Imagine Movies =

Television channel in the United Arab Emirates

- Country: UAE
- Broadcast area: Middle East, Africa
- Headquarters: UAE

Programming
- Picture format: 4:3 (576i, SDTV)

Ownership
- Sister channels: Imagine TV

Imagine Movies is a Dubai-based Free-To-Air (FTA) Bollywood Movies channel that showcases the latest and evergreen movies of all time. The Only FTA channel with most reach in the GCC region* and great channel# placement on platforms like NileSat, E-Vision, Pehla & Du. The channel runs Indian Hindi television Shows and Hindi Movies (2000 – 2017 releases) with Arabic subtitles and also some Local contests that are hosted and held by local celebs. Here you can see many Indian TV shows, Bollywood Movies (evergreen, Classic, Horror, Romantic, etc.), Bollywood Event shows, Celebs Shows (as interview etc.) & UAE organised program etc.

== Availability ==
Imagine Movies Channel is broadcast on Nilesat, STB platforms: NileSat, E-Vision, Cable Platforms: Bahrain Cable, Qatar Cable and Saudi Arabia Cable.
