= Shalini Chandran =

Indian actress

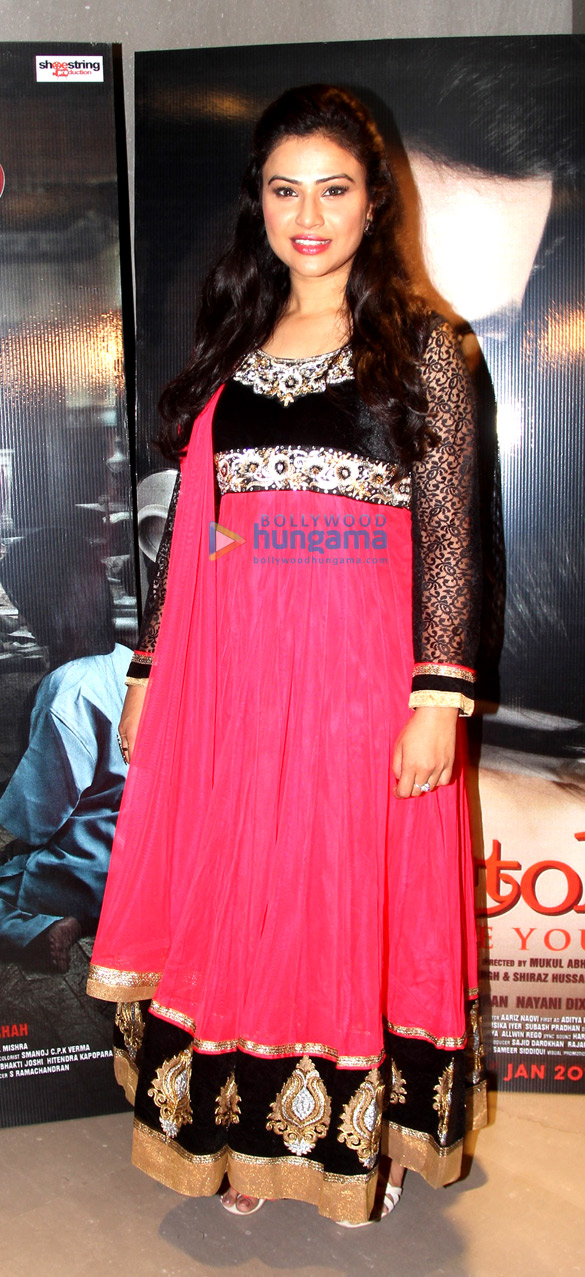
- Shalini Chandran in 2015
- Occupation: Actress
- Years active: 2006–2015; 2024–present

Shalini Chandran is an Indian actress known for her role of Maithili in Kahaani Ghar Ghar Kii. She also appeared as Tanya in Hamari Betiyoon Ka Vivaah and has performed on Kabhi Kabhii Pyaar Kabhi Kabhii Yaar.

== Filmography ==
=== Films ===
Year	Title	Role	Note
2010	Badmaash Company	Anu (Shahid Kapoor's sister	
2010	Vulture	Dr Ritika	
	Desire		Short
	Love		
2015	Shaandaar	Meetu	

=== Television ===
Year	Title	Role	Ref
2006–2008	Kahaani Ghar Ghar Kii	Maithili	
2008	Kabhi Kabhii Pyaar Kabhi Kabhii Yaar	herself	
2008	Hamari Betiyoon Ka Vivaah	Tanya Kohli	
	Crime Patrol (TV series)	recurring	
2010	Rishton Se Badi Pratha	Surbhi (replaced by Parul Chauhan)	
	Vivah	Palak	
2013	Savdhaan India		
2024	Pracchand Ashok	Maharani Shubhadrangi "Dharma" Maurya	
2024–2025	Jaane Anjaane Hum Mile	Neeta Suryavanshi	
2025	CID	Rupa	
2025–2026	Itti Si Khushi	Advocate Leena Dharmadhikari	
