= Rishton Se Badi Pratha =

Indian television series

- Genre: Drama
- Written by: Pearl Grey, Shanti Bhushan, & Vishal Watwani
- Directed by: Kamal Monga, Gurpreet Rana, Jatin Ravasia, Santosh Bhatt,
- Creative directors: Renu Rana & Meeit Kohli
- Starring: See below
- Theme music composer: Adil Ganderia
- Opening theme: "Rishton Se Badi Pratha" by Richa Sharma
- Country of origin: India
- Original language: Hindi
- No. of seasons: 01
- No. of episodes: 135

Production
- Executive producer: Neeraj Tolani
- Producer: Pearl Grey
- Production location: Mumbai
- Cinematography: Santosh Suryavanshi
- Editor: Swapnil Nerurkar
- Camera setup: Multi-camera
- Running time: Approx. 23 minutes
- Production companies: Spellbound Productions & Walkwater Media Ltd

Original release
- Network: Colors TV
- Release: 15 November 2010 – 27 May 2011

Rishton Se Badi Pratha (transl. Customs, More Important Than Relationships) is an Indian television series that aired on Colors TV from 2010 to 2011. The series is about a couple in love who are not from the same caste, and are threatened with honour killing.

It stars Shalini Chandran and Vishal Karwal as Surbhi and Abhay. Chandran was later replaced by Parul Chauhan.

== Plot ==
It narrates the story of two lovers, Abhay and Surbhi, living in western Uttar Pradesh. They incur the wrath of their respective families when they elope with each other. Their family members decide to teach them a lesson by the barbaric practice of honour killing. However, when Abhay reveals that Surbhi is expecting his child, his family spares the couple's lives in the hope of a son being born to her. Surrounded by hostile relatives, Abhay and Surbhi have to cross many hurdles in order to safeguard themselves and their child.

== Reception ==
In 2010, the Ministry of Information and Broadcasting charged Colors TV with denigrating women by showing excessive violence and cruelty against the female character in Rishton Se Badi Pratha.

== Cast ==
- Gaurav Chaudhary / Vishal Karwal as Abhay Markanday Suryavanshi
- Shalini Chandran / Parul Chauhan as Surbhi Abhay Suryavanshi
- Nimai Bali as Markanday Suryavanshi
- Seema Pandey as Pushpa Markanday Suryavanshi
- Hindustani Bhau as Ranvijay Singh
- Srinidhi Shetty as Nidhi
- Ridheema Tiwari as Ratna Ranvijay Singh
- Kunal Karan Kapoor as Amrik Singh
- Kanika Kohli as Seema Tribhuvan Suryavanshi
- Zeb Khan as Tribhuvan Markanday Suryavanshi
- Mamta Luthra as Maayi, mother of Markanday Suryavanshi
- Tulika Upadhyay as Kajal Vishnu Suryavanshi
- Rishina Kandhari as Pratima Amar Singh
- Mahhi Vij as Nakusha
- Shabir Ahluwalia as Dutta Bhau
- Dipika Kakar as Simar
- Shoraib İbrahim as Prem
- Avika Gor as Roli
- Manish Raisinghan as Siddhant
- Sargun Mehta as Phulwa
