= 1920 (film series) =

1920 series
- Directed by: Vikram Bhatt (1920, 1921, 1920: Haunted London); Bhushan Patel (1920: Evil Returns, 1920: Haunted London); Tinu Suresh Desai (1920 London); Krishna Bhatt (1920: Horrors of the Heart)
- Written by: Vikram Bhatt
- Screenplay by: Vikram Bhatt (1920, 1921); Dheeraj Rattan (1920); Rensil D'Silva (1920: Evil Returns, 1920: Haunted London); Sukhmani Sadana (1920: London); Mahesh Bhatt; Suhrita Das (1920: Horrors of the Heart)
- Story by: Vikram Bhatt
- Produced by: Surendra Sharma; Bhagwati Gabrani; Amita Bisnoi (1920); Vikram Bhatt (1920: Evil Returns, 1920 London, 1921, 1920: Horrors of the Heart, 1920: Haunted London); Raj Kishor Khaware; Rakesh Juneja; Shwetambari Bhatt (1920: Horrors of the Heart)
- Starring: see below
- Cinematography: Pravin Bhatt (1920); Naren Gedia (1920: Evil Returns, 1920: Haunted London); Prakash Kutty (1920 London, 1921, 1920: Horrors of the Heart)
- Edited by: Kuldeep Mehan (1920, 1920 London, 1921, 1920: Horrors of the Heart, 1920: Haunted London); Swapnil Raj (1920: Evil Returns, 1920: Haunted London)
- Music by: Adnan Sami (1920); Chirantan Bhatt (1920: Evil Returns, 1920: Haunted London); Sharib-Tishi; JAM8 (1920 London); Harish Sagane; Asad Khan; Pranish Mawale (1921); Puneet Dixit (1920: Horrors of the Heart)
- Production companies: ASA Productions and Enterprises Pvt. Ltd. (1920, 1920: Evil Returns, 1920: Haunted London); Reliance Entertainment (1920 London, 1921, 1920 Haunted London); LoneRanger Productions; Uniseller Production (1921); Vikram Bhatt Production and Houseful Motion Pictures Private Ltd (1920: Horrors of the Heart)
- Distributed by: Reliance Entertainment (1920, 1920: Evil Returns, 1920 London, 1921, 1920 Haunted London); Laxmi Ganpathy Films (1920: Horrors of the Heart)
- Country: India
- Language: Hindi
- Budget: ₹62 crore
- Box office: ₹108.07 crore

1920 is a series of Indian horror films. The story is written by Vikram Bhatt, for all three films in the series. The first film released in 2008 is directed by Vikram Bhatt, the second film released in 2012 is directed by Bhushan Patel and the third film directed by Tinu Suresh Desai released in 2016. The first two films were commercially successful at the box office, while the third film did moderately well. In 2018, a spin-off film called 1921 was released. This was the first film in a new franchise by creator Vikram Bhatt.

== Films ==
=== 1920 (2008) ===
After forsaking his family and God, a husband finds his wife is demoniacally possessed.

=== 1920: Evil Returns (2012) ===
A famous poet meets a woman who is in trouble. In order to treat her, he takes her to a big hospital in Shimla, but soon that woman gets possessed by devil.

=== 1920 London: Fear Strikes Again (2016) ===
After her husband is possessed by an evil spirit, a woman turns to her former lover to perform an exorcism.

=== 1921 (2018) ===
In 1920s England, a pianist enlists the help of a ghost whisperer to cleanse the unclean spirit that is haunting him.

=== 1920: Horrors of The Heart (2023) ===
The fifth film announced by the makers, it is directed by Krishna Bhatt, written by Mahesh Bhatt and produced by Vikram Bhatt, starring Avika Gor and Randheer Rai.

=== 1920: Cold Winter (2027) ===
1920: Cold Winter is the sixth installment in the hit Indian horror franchise created by filmmaker Vikram Bhatt. Produced by Anand Pandit, and Music by Himesh Reshammiya. This 3D supernatural thriller serves as a dark and chilling return to the universe's Gothic roots with the tagline "Beware the innocent. They hide the darkest evil."

== Cast ==
=== 1920 (2008) ===
- Rajneesh Duggal as Arjun Singh Rathod
- Adah Sharma as Lisa Singh Rathod, reincarnated version of Gayatri
- Anjori Alagh as Gayatri
- Indraneil Sengupta as Sipahi Mohan Kant
- Raj Zutshi as Father Thomas
- Sri Vallabh Vyas as the Doctor
- Vipin Sharma as the caretaker of the haveli (manor house) i.e. haunted palace
- Asha Sharma as Radha Maa
- Rakhi Sawant, special appearance in the item song "Bichua"

=== 1920: Evil Returns (2012) ===
- Aftab Shivdasani as Jaidev Verma
- Tia Bajpai as Smriti/ Sangeeta
- Sharad Kelkar as Amar (Evil Spirit)
- Vidya Malvade as Karuna
- Vicky Ahuja as Bankimlal

=== 1920 London: Fear Strikes Again (2016) ===
- Sharman Joshi as Jai Singh Gujjar
- Meera Chopra as Shivangi
- Vishal Karwal as Veer singh
- Gajendra Chauhan as Tantrik
- Meenal Kapoor as Witch
- Sushmita Mukherjee as Kesar Maa

=== 1921 (2018) ===
- Karan Kundra as Ayush
- Zareen Khan as Rose
- Vikram Bhatt as Mr. Wadia

=== 1920: Horrors of the Heart (2023) ===
- Avika Gor as Meghna
- Rahul Dev as Shantanu; Meghna's stepfather who is Maharaja of princely state of Girvaar
- Barkha Bisht as Meghna's mother

== Crew ==
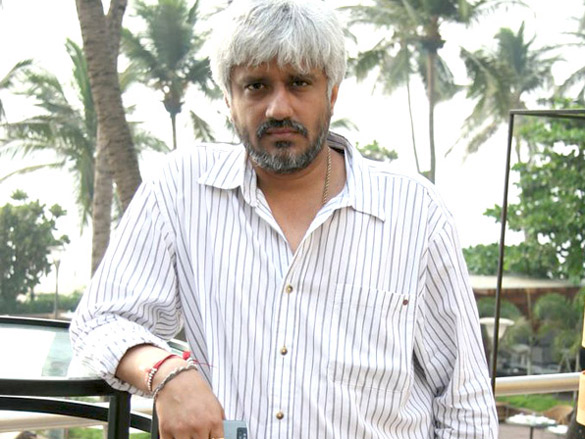
Vikram Bhatt had the concept of 1920 series.

Occupation	Film(s)				
Occupation	1920 (2008)	1920: The Evil Returns (2012)	1920 London: Fear Strikes Again (2016)	1921 (2018)	1920: Horrors of the Heart (2023)
Director	Vikram Bhatt	Bhushan Patel	Tinu Suresh Desai	Vikram Bhatt	Krishna Bhatt
Producer(s)	Surendra Sharma Bhagwati Gabrani Amita Bisnoi	Vikram Bhatt	Vikram Bhatt	Vikram Bhatt	Vikram Bhatt Raj Kishor Khaware Rakesh Juneja Shwetambari Bhatt
Writer	Vikram Bhatt	Vikram Bhatt	Vikram Bhatt	Vikram Bhatt	Mahesh Bhatt Suhrita Das
Composer(s)	Adnan Sami; Salim–Sulaiman	Chirantan Bhatt	Sharib-Toshi; JAM8	Harish Sagane Asad Khan Pranish Mawale	Puneet Dixit
Editor(s)	Kuldeep Mehan	Swapnil Raj	Kuldeep Mehan	Kuldeep Mehan	Kuldeep Mehan

== Release and revenue ==
Film	Release date	Budget	Worldwide Box Office	Ref.
1920	12 September 2008	₹7 crore (US$1.61 million)	₹14.5 crore (US$3.33 million)	
1920: Evil Returns	2 November 2012	₹9 crore (US$1.68 million)	₹28.04 crore (US$5.25 million)	
1920 London	6 May 2016	₹21 crore (US$3.13 million)	₹22.98 crore (US$3.42 million)	
1921	12 January 2018	₹15 crore (US$2.19 million)	₹22.8 crore (US$3.33 million)	
1920 Horrors Of The Heart	23 June 2023	₹10 crore (US$1.21 million)	₹17.35 crore (US$2.1 million)	
Total		₹62 crore (US$6.4 million)	₹105.67 crore (US$11 million)	
