= NyooTV =

American video on demand platform

- Company type: Private
- Website type: Entertainment, Video streaming, Video on Demand
- Headquarters: Philadelphia, {{{location_country}}}
- Owner: AKG Technologies Inc.
- Founder: Gaurav Mendiratta
- Key people: Gaurav Mendiratta, Founder & President Saravanan M P, Director of Engineering Achalesh Amar, VP, Content Management
- Website: http://www.nyootv.com
- Launched: Oct 2009

NyooTV is a video on demand platform built using adaptive streaming and customized mobile applications which is claimed to work even with low bandwidths. It aggregates and offers Indian entertainment content across new media platforms and digital entertainment devices currently to Indian audiences in US and India. Registered users can get news about movies by following NyooTV through social networking sites. NyooTV provides global video content like TV shows, Bollywood films, Bollywood news, New Bollywood songs, events and sports events of interest to Indian consumers.

NyooTV also produces its own content through in-house initiatives.

NyooTV's parent company AKG Technologies Inc. was founded in January 2009 with offices in Philadelphia and Bhopal. AKG Technologies Inc. was registered under the broad AKG Group and AKG Entertainment was positioned as the India entity.

Gaurav Mendiratta is the Founder and President of AKG Technologies Inc., which builds products for internet and mobile focused at the Indian digital entertainment industry.

The company's Board of Directors consists of Peter F. Gardner, an investment banker and a seed investor in Last.FM, Kartik Hosanagar, a professor of Information and Operations Management at The Wharton School and is also the co-founder of Yodle Inc.

NyooTV generates revenue using video advertisements even from long tail or shelved and old content.

== History ==
- AKG Technologies Inc. was founded in January 2009 with offices in Philadelphia and Bhopal. NyooTV was conceptualized and development work began at the Bhopal office. AKG Technologies Inc. was registered under the broad AKG Group and AKG Entertainment was positioned as the India entity.
- The alpha phase of website NyooTV.com was rolled out internally on 30 March 2009.
- In August 2009 Peter Gardner and a few other investors gave a boost to the NyooTV idea by investing in AKG group.
- In October 2009 the open alpha was rolled out to select external audience for their feedback on features, functionality and look & feel
- AKG Entertainment Inc opened their Mumbai office in December 2009 which looked into business development and marketing. During the same time, Professor Karthik Hosanagar, assistant professor of Information and Operations Management at the Wharton School of Business, University of Pennsylvania joined the board of directors of AKG Group.
- NyooTV open alpha version with social media integration was launched in December 2009 which incorporated strategic changes to the website enhancing end user experience. NyooTV integrated with social media sites like Facebook, Twitter and Myspace.
- AKG Group signed a deal with NDTV imagine on 20 December 2009 for procuring the ongoing and past TV shows for its Social TV network, NyooTV.com.
- NyooTV started a new trend of online movie launches for the first time in India with the launch of The 13th Day – An Untold Truth directed by Raajeev Walia, produced by Chand Mishra, I.M.S Reddy and Film Division of Brahma Kumaris. The movie was available to the public for free on the web, the day it was released in theatres.
- On 10 March 2010, AKG Group announced its tie up with Shemaroo Entertainment for online video services. Shemaroo provides AKG with premium video content for NyooTV.
- On 2 April 2010, NyooTV unveiled a new interface.
- NyooTV.com signed an exclusive deal on 13 April 2010 with Eternal Films for the digital content distribution on its platform "You Know…AMRAPALI", an upcoming Bollywood movie.
- In 2010, AKG Entertainment entered into partnerships with COLORS and MTV, television channels in India to procure and provide content to its users. Popular shows on these channels would now be available for viewing on NyooTV.

== Significant Features ==
- NyooTV's content has been categorized according to popular regional languages to help users pick regional films or TV shows of their choice.
- Searching videos are an easy task with auto suggest keywords based on popular searches
- One stop source for all Indian entertainment content with indexed content from all major content portals
- Pungi corner or the shout box is a unique feature where one can make friends, share his views and discuss various things.
- NyooTV offers very high definition videos giving users the option of choosing their quality of video. Users can either opt for a buffer free viewing or opt for high quality videos based on internet speed
- Users can report video issues by just a click on the link below the player
- Users can create accounts or use existing social network (Facebook/Twitter/MySpace) login – With a user account, users can chat with other users through shout box, create and maintain favourite videos list, make friends with other NyooTV users and find out what they are doing at NyooTV. A user can also invite his friends from Facebook, Gmail or Yahoo to join them on NyooTV.com for some fun and entertainment as they can choose to like, dislike or share a video with their friends in addition to commenting about a video
- NyooTV also has a super interactive NyooTV Application exclusive to Facebook users. Once logged into their Facebook account, a user can engage in this interesting app that has not only just scores of videos on films, TV shows and music but also quizzes and games. Users can find quizzes on films, celebrities, music, politics and sports. One can also create his own cricket team through the Social Premiere League (SPL) and play matches with other existing teams
- Users also have a Facebook Like or tweet through Twitter option to share videos and photos.

== Content Categorization ==
The premium legal content on NyooTV is divided into the following categories:

- Movies: movie trailers, clips and full movies. Spread over a variety of genres, Bollywood, Mollywood and Tollywood films.
- TV Shows: Partnerships with Channel Providers help NyooTV provide TV shows, especially those which are not aired anymore.
- Sports: Users will be able to watch sporting events live or on demand. Matches which were played earlier can also be viewed.
- Entertainment: Award Ceremonies, Live Performances, Music Albums, Fashion shows and Celebrity Interviews can be watched on NyooTV.
- Blogs: NyooTV provides reviews of movies, TV shows and sporting events. Users can use NyooTV as a platform to post comments, reviews and discuss all the content available on the website.
- Music Videos: A special section is dedicated only for viewing music videos, be it Bollywood, Devotional, Indi-Pop, Indi-Rock or even upcoming movie trailers.
- Channels:This section allows users can select a channel to view the video they want to, be it TV shows, films or any other content from a particular channel
- Photos: This section is a gallery of photographs of events not only in Bollywood but all events that take place in India's television industry and the glamour world.

== Partnerships ==
NyooTV has partnered with names in the entertainment industry like Shemaroo, Imagine TV, ACK Media, ASC Digital, 1TakeMedia, Times Music and iStream( COLORS & MTV). In addition to licensing over 4200+ movies and 10,000+ TV shows titles, NyooTV has indexed legal Indian content from all over the web including portals like Rajshri, Bollywood Hungama, Metacafe, Zimbio, BigFlix and 30 more websites. NyooTV also partners with VDopia to procure ad content.

== Content Accessibility ==
On PC

NyooTV provides a website which delivers video entertainment on demand. This website is built to cater to the Indian crowds.

On Mobile

NyooTV would be available on the mobile using 3G, CDMA, WiFi or WiMAX networks via mobile browser and applications. These applications would enable the users to take video entertainment and access it on demand. The video quality experience would be optimized for the mobile networks and mobile screen size to provide the optimum experience possible.

NyooTV application is currently available on iPhone in US and UK. They will also build applications for all phones running the following OS/applications. iPhone, Adobe Flash Lite 3.0, Symbian OS., J2ME., Windows Mobile 6.1, BlackBerry, Android

NyooTV application is available in the Ovi Store for Nokia users for free. The application has been built on the Flash Lite platform and is compatible on all Nokia models.

== See also ==
- Video on demand
- Digital rights management
