= 1920: Horrors of the Heart =

1920 Horrors of the Heart
- Theatrical release poster
- Directed by: Krishna Bhatt
- Written by: Mahesh Bhatt; Suhrita Das
- Produced by: Vikram Bhatt; Raj Kishor Khaware; Rakesh Juneja; Shwetambari Bhatt
- Starring: Avika Gor; Rahul Dev; Barkha Bisht; Randheer Rai
- Cinematography: Prakash Kutty
- Edited by: Kuldeep Mehan
- Music by: Puneet Dixit
- Production companies: VSB Production; Anand Pandit Motion Pictures
- Release date: 23 June 2023
- Running time: 123 minutes
- Country: India
- Language: Hindi
- Box office: est. ₹17.35 crore

1920: Horrors of the Heart is a 2023 Indian Hindi-language horror film directed by Krishna Bhatt, written by Mahesh Bhatt, and produced by Vikram Bhatt, Raj Kishor Khaware, Rakesh Juneja and Shwetambari Bhatt. It is the fifth film of 1920 film series. It stars Avika Gor and Rahul Dev in lead roles. Barkha Bisht, Randheer Rai, Danish Pandor, Ketaki Kulkarni, Avtar Gill, and Amit Behl appear in supporting roles. The film follows a woman, seeking revenge for the murder-suicide of her father, unleashes his spirit onto her estranged mother, with unexpected consequences.

== Plot ==
In 1920 Bombay, 21 year old Meghna's father Dheeraj, a struggling writer commits suicide by hanging himself. However, the doctor and the policeman inform Meghna and her boyfriend Arjun that when they dissected Dheeraj's body in the autopsy, they found that even though his cardiovascular system was intact, his heart was missing. At the ritual of the cremation of Dheeraj's body, some strange events happen. The bottle of holy water burns Meghna's hand and for a moment, she also sees a half-dead brahmin dressed in black clothes. After Meghna stumbles upon his personal diary, which uncovers Radhika, her mother's scandalous past of liaisons with British people for monetary gains and fame. She learns that her mother had once poisoned her father in an attempt to kill him, but he miraculously survived. Unable to endure her deeds, Meghna's mother abandoned her family, eventually marrying the wealthy Maharaja of princely state of Girvaar, Shantanu. Stricken by the revelation, Meghna turns to Dheeraj's grave, where she communicates with his spirit. Under his guidance and vowing revenge, Meghna goes to her mother's opulent house.

The first thing that Meghna did was to blow out the sacred lamp (diya) of the house. The brahmin from earlier is then seen outside the house, who instructs Dheeraj to enter the house. This causes Radhika to experience a nightmare where she sees Dheeraj. Shantanu comforts her after she wakes up from the nightmare. The next day, the housekeeper tries to again ignite the lamp but fails. He is suspicious of Meghna as the lamp never blew out until she started living in the house.

Meghna forms a bond with her steps sister Aditi, despite Dheeraj's instruction not to let affection distract her from her mission. Meghna's boyfriend Arjun has also come to Girvaar and the two share a moment of affection. Afterwards in Meghna's dream, Dheeraj becomes angry with her for not ignoring Arjun and threatens to stop working with her in the mission. When Meghna wakes up, Arjun has already heard everything in the dream and becomes aware of her destructive intentions towards her mother Radhika. He gives her an ultimatum of returning to Bombay with him or else he would tell the truth to her parents. That night, he is violently attacked in his hotel at the hands of Dheeraj's spirit.

In an unexpected turn of events, when Meghna visits Arjun in the hospital, he asks Meghna to continue her revenge and presents her with an earthen pot (kalasa in Hindi) filled with the ashes of Dheeraj's cremated body. However, after Meghna leaves the room, Arjun is revealed to be possessed by the evil black magic practitioner Rahasur (whom Meghna saw at the earlier ritual) and the real Arjun was actually killed the night of his violent attack at the hotel and his body possessed. After sprinkling the ashes under Aditi's pillow, Aditi becomes possessed. She performs inexplicable actions, which terrifies the household. Despite attempts from the housekeeper to expose Meghna, Radhika and Shantanu decide to trust her.

Meghna then receives a message to meet Arjun at the back of the palace where he asks her to leave with him as her work is done. When the housekeeper discovers them, Arjun violently kills the housekeeper and both Arjun and Meghna throw the housekeeper's dead body into a well. Boarding the train for Bombay with Arjun, Meghna sees their reflection in the mirror of the train window and finds out Arjun to be Rahasur. Fleeing from Rahasur the journey brings her back to her mother's mansion, where the gardener hands Meghna her mother's old diary.

Upon reading the true diary, Meghna is confronted with a devastating truth - her father Dheeraj was a malevolent man who would trade his wife for money and power. When Radhika protested, he consumed poison to instill fear in her but survived. Radhika tried to commit suicide but was saved by Shantanu who fell in love with her. They tried to find Meghna to save her but by then Dheeraj had abducted her. Realizing her grave mistake of believing the fake diary and attempting to take revenge on her mother Radhika, Meghna confesses to Radhika that she aided her father's spirit in possessing Aditi. The family brings in a Hindu priest who reveals that Meghna's father had a pact with the evil Rahasur- his spirit would live on to ruin Radhika in exchange for his heart after death, thus explaining why Rahasur was involved in the earlier mission and why Meghna saw him for a moment in the ritual.

With no other way to save Aditi, Meghna lights the lamp in the temple and stabs herself with the trident of Goddess Durga, killing herself. Her spirit fights her father's spirit in the spirit realm, ultimately sending him into the light. She also tries to go but her boyfriend Arjun's spirit stops her who advises her to return to the living world. When Meghna regains consciousness, she finds herself in a hospital bed, surrounded by Radhika, Shantunu, and Aditi, symbolizing a fresh start.

== Cast ==
- Avika Gor as Meghna
- Rahul Dev as Shantanu; Meghna's stepfather who is Maharaja of princely state of Girvaar
- Barkha Bisht as Radhika, Meghna's mother
- Randheer Rai as Dheeraj; Meghna's late father
- Danish Pandor as Arjun; Meghna's boyfriend
- Ketaki Kulkarni as Aditi; Meghna's step sister
- Amit Behl as Rahasur, an evil black magic practitioner
- Avtar Gill as Chief Servant Chaudhary
- Arbendra Pratap as Mali; the gardner of Girvaar palace
- Bhavya Prajapati as Young Meghna

== Release ==
The film's teaser was released on 24 February 2023 under Zee Music Company. The trailer was released on 1 June 2023 under Zee Music Company.

== Reception ==
The film received negative reviews from critics.

Abhishek Srivastava of The Times of India gave the film 2 out of 5 stars and called it "clichéd, with a ridiculous plot that fails to engage viewers. The liberties taken and incorporated into the story are more exasperating than amusing". Bollywood Hungama rated the film 1.5 out of 5 stars and wrote, "Mahesh Bhatt and Suhrita Das' screenplay sadly doesn't do justice to the plot. Shweta Bothra's dialogues are too filmy. Krishna Bhatt's direction is not up to the mark." Similarly, The Free Press Journal critic Rohit Bhatnagar rated the film 1.5/5 and wrote, "If you have been missing the melodramatic television show Balika Vadhu, then here’s a chance for you to relive the experience on the big screen with a grown-up and much more glamorous Anandi aka Avika Gor, but with a horror spin".

=== Box office ===
The film collected ₹17.35 crore against a budget of ₹10 crore and emerged as a box office success by the third week of it being in theatres.

== Soundtrack ==
1920 Horrors of the Heart

Soundtrack album by Puneet Dixit
- Released: 7 June 2023
- Genre: Feature film soundtrack
- Length: 39:03
- Language: Hindi
- Label: Zee Music Company

Official audio
- 1920 Horrors of the Heart - Full Album on YouTube

The music of the film is composed by Puneet Dixit. All lyrics are written by Shweta Bothra.

The first single titled "Woh Kahani" was released on 5 June 2023. The full album was released on 7 June 2023 under Zee Music Company.

No.	Title	Singer(s)	Length
1.	"Woh Kahani"	Papon	5:04
2.	"Aye Zindagi"	Esha Gaur & Farhan Sabri	4:31
3.	"Zaroori Hai"	Javed Ali & Palak Muchhal	5:46
4.	"Lori"	Shreya Ghoshal	3:05
5.	"Woh Kahani (Unplugged Version)"	Puneet Dixit	4:14
6.	"Woh Kahani (Club Mix)"	Pranav Singhal	4:05
7.	"Zaroori Hai (Female Version)"	Palak Muchhal	3:37
8.	"Zaroori Hai (Reprise Version)"	Puneet Dixit & Deepali Sathe	5:31
9.	"Lori (Slow Version)"	Shreya Ghoshal	3:10
Total length:			39:03
