= Dharm Yoddha Garud =

Indian Hindi language mythological television serial

- Genre: Hindu mythology
- Created by: Abhimanyu Singh
- Screenplay by: Sweksha Bhagat; Nishant Shandilya
- Story by: Brij Mohan Pandey
- Directed by: Mukesh Kumar Singh; Nishi Chandra
- Starring: See below
- Opening theme: "Dharm Yoddha Garud"
- Country of origin: India
- Original language: Hindi
- No. of episodes: 234

Production
- Producers: Abhimanyu Singh; Rupali Kadiyan
- Editors: Shams Mirza; Pradeep Rawani
- Camera setup: Multi- camera
- Running time: 22 minutes
- Production company: Contiloe Entertainment

Original release
- Network: Sony Sab
- Release: 14 March – 10 December 2022

Dharm Yoddha Garud (transl. The Righteous Warrior: Garud) is an Indian Hindi language mythological television serial. It depicts the story of Garuda. The show stars Faisal Khan, Toral Rasputra and Parul Chauhan. It is produced by Contiloe Entertainment. The show aired from 14 March 2022 to 10 December 2022 on Sony SAB and digitally available on SonyLIV.

== Plot ==
The story begins with Garud coming to meet his mother, Vinataa. They share a very good bond and have a great love for each other. Garud hates his Naag (Snake) Brothers and his maternal aunt Queen Kadru who ill-treats his mother Vinata. He always tries to know how his mother became Kadru's slave. Vinata gets scared because of the snakes, especially Kaaliya, and Garud comes to save her and shows his ultimate power to the Snakes and Kadru. However, Vinata cools Garud. Vinata then teaches Garud how to stay calm and several important life lessons. Garud asks his mother how to reach Vaikunth, and she tells him. He goes there on the pretext of freeing his mother from slavery and knowing what actually happened. After a series of incidents, he encounters Shesh Naag, who tells him about Vinata and Kadru's past but doesn't know how Vinata became Kadru's slave. He tells him to meet Aditi Maa, the God's mother, to know what really happened. He goes there. He fights the Asura Army who came to kill Aditi Maa and succeeds. To save her children, Diti Maa promises to tell how Vinata became Kadru's slave. Garud goes back and asks Kadru if what she had done was right or not. Her children get angry, and a fight is started between Garud and the Snakes. As a punishment, Garud is made Kadru and her children's slaves. However, Rahu arrives and asks for Garud. Kadru denies to which Rahu retaliates by insulting Kadru. After seeing that Rahu is insulting their mother Takshaka, Kaaliya, and their brothers fight alongside Garud against Rahu and his army. Seeing this, Kadru orders Garud to take her to Maharaj Bali and tells her sons to take care of Garud's mother, Vinata. Rahu notices that Garud along with Kadru is flying away. He then divides himself into two, and one goes behind Garud to see where he is going. They meet Maharaj Bali and convince him to stop the war. The fight is stopped with Kadru praising her sons and Garud wondering why Kadru protected him. Garud is then given a task by Kadru: Get the Suryaphool. Garud, accompanied by his Brothers, accidentally reached Shani Loka, where he is tested and passed. Shani Dev gets angry at the Naag Brothers and they all fall down. Garud doesn't recognise any of the Naag Brothers falling down and gets the Suryaphool. Kadru gets angry and curses Garud. Vinata and Garud pray to Vishnu to prove Garud innocent. Vishnu awakes from his meditation and tells Garud that he will face a lot of trouble and that he will be a part of something big in his life.

Lord Vishnu then tells Goddess Aditi, who is meditating, that good times will come again for the deities. Goddess Aditi comes to find Garuda who helped her, and with Kadru's approval, she goes with Garuda to find her children. Lord Vishnu tells about Samudra Manthana and Garuda lifting the Mandaraachal mountain and placing it in the ocean of milk. Here, Garuda gets his stepbrother, Vasuki Naag, to be the rope for Sagara Manthan. Gods and Asuras jointly perform these tasks and share the ratnas that descend there. During these events, a surprising event occurs in Vinata's household. Vinata went to the forest one day to collect firewood and met an old Baba who took him to her house and took care of him by giving him food. Later he proves to be sage Dattatreya and he blesses Vinata. At that time, signs of Lakshmi's arrival appear through Sagara Manthan. The arrival of Goddess Lakshmi takes place through the ocean, followed by the marriage of Lord Vishnu and Goddess Lakshmi. Aditi, Diti, Kadru and Vinata also participate in this. Vinata won everyone's favour there. Garuda's devotion is also praised by Lakshmi Narayan. The marriage ends and the Sagara manthana begins again where Amrita emerges. The Asuras, by trickery, steal the Amrit and the Devata's follow them. Vishnu takes the form of Mohini to trick the Asuras. Goddess Mohini gives Amrita to gods. Indra's son Jayanta keeps the Amrita in a safe place. Later Garuda returns to his mother. Under the guidance of Lord Vishnu, Garuda learns from Nar and Narayan. For this, the blessings of Ganesha and Goddess Saraswati are received and Garud gets a new task.

Then Kadru says that if Amrita kalasha is placed before her, Vinata and Garuda will be freed from slavery. Garuda goes to Indra Lok and defeats Indra and brings the nectar. On the way, Vishnu is ready to punish Garud but Lakshmi stops him. He then tells Indra to take the Amrit after Garud and Vinata received freedom. They both received freedom. Vishnu tells Kadru that all her sons will be food for birds like Garud in the future. Everyone decides to celebrate Ganesh Chaturthi and Nar Narayan decides to tell the story of Lord Ganesh.

Ganesh sends Mushak to see what his mother is preparing for him. Mushak gets caught by Kartikeya. All the Gods and Goddesses arrive and wish Ganesh. Kadru arrives and asks forgiveness from Vinata and Garud, being totally reformed. Nar Narayan tells the story of Ganesh from where His mother wanted a son like Vishnu's avatar, Krishna.

Vishnu arrives and blesses her. But, Mahadev goes to bless 2 Demons, thus missing the chance of seeing his son. Very soon, Parvati gives birth to a son. She tells him to not let anyone come in until the time she finishes her meditation. However, when Mahadev returns and Ganesh stops him and he gets angry and cuts Ganesh's head. All of them realise who Ganesh is. Parvati realises what had happened and swears to destroy everything but Mahadev gives life to Ganesh with an elephant head. Parvati at first refuses to accept him but later accepts him.

Ganesh arrives at the end of the story and gives Garud the good news that he is going to be Vishnu's vahak. Garud gets extremely happy and goes to Vaikunth. Vishnu tells Garud to lift his finger but he falls down and as a result, he loses his powers and to regain his powers and become Vishnu's Vahaan, they take a human form to complete a mission.

They go to help Shastri and her husband to find their missing son by narrating the tale of Maa Parvati and all of her nine avatar's. With each passing day, both Garud and Shastri get the blessings. Their greedy sister tries to take control of the house. At the 10th day, their son returns and the greedy sister realises her mistakes. Vishnu, Lakshmi and Garud return to Vaikunth.

Maa Lakshmi tells the story of 'Bhaktha Pralhad' and Narasimha Avatar of Vishnu. Later Gajendra calls for help and Garud finally gets to be Vishnu's Vahaan. They help Gajendra and the Devta's hail the name of Vishnu and Garud.

== Cast and characters ==
=== Main ===
- Faisal Khan as Lord Garuda; Sage Kashyap and Vinata's son, Aruna's brother, Kadru's nephew/stepson (2022)
  - Diaan Talaviya as child Garud (2022)
- Toral Rasputra as Vinata; King Daksha and Asikni's daughter; Sage Kashyap's fourth wife, Aruna and Garud's Mother, Diti, Aditi and Kadru's sister (2022)
- Parul Chauhan Thakkar as Kadru; King Daksha and Asikni's daughter, Sage Kashyap's third wife, Naag's mother, Diti, Aditi and Vinata's sister (2022)

=== Recurring ===
- Ankit Raj as Kaliya Naag; Sage Kashyap and Kadru's son; Takshak and Naag's brother (2022)
- Angad Hasija as Takshak Naag; Sage Kashyap's and Kadru's son; Kaliya and Naag's brother (2022)
- Vishal Karwal as Lord Vishnu (2022)
- Neetha Shetty as Lakshmi (2022)
- Abhishek Soni as Aruna; Sage Kashyap and Vinata's son, Garud's Brother. He is the Charioteer of Lord Surya (2022)
- Hrishikesh Pandey as Sage Kashyap; Aditi, Diti, Kadru, Vinata, Danu, Surabhi, Krodhavasha, Ira and Muni's husband; Father of Arun, Garuda, Naags, Adityas, Devas, Rudras, Vasus, Daityas, Maruts, Danavas, Krodhavasas, Manasa, Iravati, Gandharvas, Vamana and Apsara (2022)
- Soni Singh as Diti; Sage Kashyap's second wife, Daitya's mother, Kadru, Aditi and Vinata's sister (2022)
- Piyali Munshi as Aditi; Sage Kashyap's first wife, Deva's mother, Kadru, Diti and Vinata's sister (2022)
- Swayam Joshi as Sanatan; Son Of Brahma (2022)
- Niel Satpuda as Kartikey
- Amit Bhanushali as Sheshnaag; Sage Kashyap and Kadru's son and Naag's eldest brother (2022)
- Rishav Trivedi as Vasuki; Sage Kashyap and Kadru's son and Naag's brother (2022)
- Abhinav Kumar as Indra Dev (2022)
- Aditya Sidhu as Mahabali (2022)
  - Dinesh Mehta replaced Sidhu (2022)
- Feroz Ali as Prajapati Daksh (2022)
- Shillpa Kataria Singh as Mainadevi (2022)
- Sachin Verma as Lord Shiva (2022)
- Nidhi Seth as
  - Parvati
  - Sati
  - Durga
  - Lalitha Tripura Sundari
  - Adishakti
  - Annapurna
  - Navadurga

(2022)

- Ankit Gulati as Lord Shani (2022)
- Neha Tiwari as Dhamini (2022)
- Anu Thapa as Simhika (2022)
- Praneet Bhat as Dattatreya (2022)
- Prince Dhiman as Varun dev (2022)
- Pradeep Singh Adhikari as Vaayu dev (2022)
- Devaksh Rai as Agni Dev (2022)
- Saarvi Omana as Goddess Patal Bhairavi (2022)
- Gulshan Rana as Guru Brihaspati (2022)
- Digvijay Purohit as Guru Shukracharya (2022)
- Sharad Gore as Rishi Durvasa (2022)
- Vijay Malviya as Kakol (2022)
- Sandeep Sharma as Maharishi Narada (2022)
- Javed Pathan as Tarkasur (2022)
- Aishwarya Raj Bhakuni as Mohini (2022)
- Ayan Kapoor as Hiranyakashipu

== See also ==
- List of programmes broadcast by Sony SAB
