= 1921 (2018 film) =

2018 Indian horror film directed and produced by Vikram Bhatt

- Theatrical release poster
- Directed by: Vikram Bhatt
- Written by: Vikram Bhatt
- Produced by: Vikram Bhatt
- Starring: Zareen Khan; Karan Kundra; Vikram Bhatt
- Cinematography: Prakash Kutty
- Edited by: Kuldip Mehan
- Music by: Harish Sagane; Asad Khan; Pranit Mawale
- Production companies: Motion Picture Capital; LoneRanger Productions; Uniseller Production
- Distributed by: Reliance Entertainment
- Release date: 12 January 2018
- Running time: 144 minutes
- Country: India
- Language: Hindi
- Budget: ₹15 crore
- Box office: ₹22.8 crore

1921 is a 2018 Indian horror film, produced and directed by Vikram Bhatt, under his LoneRanger Productions banner. It stars Zareen Khan and Karan Kundrra in lead roles and was released on 12 January 2018. It is the fourth installment of the 1920 film series. The film was declared an average grosser at box office. The film follows a musician seeking the help of a paranormal investigator to unearth the secrets the mansion he is staying at, after an onslaught of increasingly deranged supernatural events has pushed him to his limits.

== Plot ==
In the United Kingdom, 1927, a crowd waits for a performance to begin. The host apologises for the delay and going backstage, furiously tells a woman named Nafisa to call Ayush, who has locked himself in a room. They break the door down to find out that Ayush has slit his wrist.

The story then flashes back to 1921, when Ayush was in Mumbai. A wealthy man, Mr. Wadia, discovers Ayush's incredible talent and asks him to take care of his mansion Wadia Manor in New York in return for Ayush's educational expenses. Ayush is overjoyed to hear this and heads towards the mansion. Ayush is warmly received by both the housekeeper and the caretaker. Ayush is very delighted to enter the York College of Music.

Three months later, Ayush is doing paperwork when he is hit with an onslaught of paranormal activities. Closed doors open by themselves. Lights start flickering. Ayush sees a white light beckoning him to come closer, but he is always stopped by a woman's scream. He encounters a message written in blood in a room. He enlists the help of Rose, a fellow student at the college, who possesses a second sight. As both investigate, they realise the secrets that they both have kept individually about events of the preceding three months have more consequences and they both might have a deeper connection with the current hauntings than they can imagine. Ayush informs her that he can hear voices of a machine, and he can see a white light calling to him but as soon as he goes near he hears a woman's scream which prevents him from touching the light.

He narrates what happened three months ago when he arrived at the mansion. He allowed the villagers to enter the mansion and listen to his music for some money. One day his actions were discovered by Meher, Mr. Wadia's niece, and she blackmailed him into giving her a performance or she will have him fired. During the performance that night, she gave Ayush a poison and tried to dump him at a place so that he could die a slow death. But Ayush hit her making her unconscious. While coming back to the mansion, he saw a supernatural being on the way and lost control of his the car, resulting in Meher's death.

To his surprise, nobody confronted him about Meher's death. Later these paranormal events began. Rose conducts an investigation on the basis of Ayush's story. She learns that Meher never visited York. During their investigation, Ayush and Rose fall in love with each other. Some time later Rose reaches a hospital in which she discovers that the Meher Wadia who visited Ayush was actually their classmate Tina who had been dead for three months. When she sees the date of her death, she is horrified. She informs to Ayush that all the bad things are happening to Ayush due to her.

She narrates how she and Nafisa's roommate Vasudha were in love with a married man named Richard, but he was not ready to divorce his wife. One day she happily informed her friends that Richard was going to marry her as Richard's wife left him. But Rose was visited by the spirit of Richard's wife and was told that Vasudha had murdered her. She informed Richard of this, which was discovered by Vasudha and she attempted suicide. They tried to save her and admitted her into a hospital. But she eventually died and her spirit got hold of Tina's body who was admitted in the same hospital. She had been tormenting Ayush since she knew that Rose is in love with him.

Rose and Ayush become convinced that they have to get rid of Vasudha's spirit and so they decide to visit a church. Vasudha attacks Nafisa, which prompts Rose to take her to a hospital where she makes another horrific discovery. She finds that Ayush is admitted into the same hospital and has been in a coma since the night Meher Wadia attacked him. Rose informs Nafisa that she has been communicating with Ayush's spirit all along. She explains that when the human body is in deep sleep, its spirit wanders off, but they are connected through a rope in the form of a white light. Eventually the spirit can re-enter the body by touching it. Ayush's spirit has tried to enter its body, but Vasudha has all along prevented it from happening. The next day Ayush's body is going to be removed from life support, which would result in his death.

Rose takes a hair of Ayush to make it touch Ayush's spirit, but as she is about to leave the hospital, Vasudha's spirit takes control of Ayush's body. She threatens Rose that she will destroy Ayush's body if she leaves. She tortures Rose by hurting Ayush's body. Rose informs Vasudha that she knew she would not be able to leave and then she kills herself. Her spirit appears and reveals that she has already sent Ayush's hair and a letter to Ayush through Nafisa. Rose fights and destroys Vasudha's spirit. At the same time, Ayush's spirit enters his body and he is saved.

The film goes back to where it all started. Ayush in a death-like state meets Rose and tells her that he wants to be with her. Rose tells him that he has to live and spread his music for her. She asks it as a return for her sacrifice. Ayush eventually recovers and becomes a renowned pianist and musician.

== Cast ==
- Zareen Khan as Rose
- Karan Kundra as Ayush
- Nidhi Chitrakar as Nafisa
- Aradhya Taing as Vasudha
- Angela Krislinzki as Dina Shaw/Meher Wadia
- Toby Hinson as Mr Brett
- Sonnia Armstrong as Lilly Lopes
- Michael Edwards as Richard
- Vikram Bhatt as Mr. Wadia

== Production ==
=== Development ===
The film was officially announced in June 2016. The title of the film was revealed to be 1921.

Zarine Khan was cast in the female lead role in the film.

=== Filming ===
The principal photography of the film commenced in May 2017 in United Kingdom.

== Soundtrack ==
1921

Soundtrack album by Harish Sagane, Asad Khan and Pranit Mawale
- Released: 26 December 2017
- Genre: Feature film soundtrack
- Length: 33:30
- Language: Hindi
- Label: Zee Music Company
External audio
- Audio Jukebox on YouTube

The music of 1921 is composed by Harish Sagane, Asad Khan and Pranit Mawale while the lyrics have been penned by Shakeel Azmi and Raqueeb Alam. The first track of the film titled as "Sunn Le Zara" which is sung by Arnab Dutta was released on 14 December 2017. The second single to be released was "Kuch Iss Tarah" which is also sung by Arnab Dutta was released on 21 December 2017. The music of the film was officially released by Zee Music Company on 22 December 2017.

Track listing
No.	Title	Lyrics	Music	Singer(s)	Length
1.	"Sunn Le Zara"	Shakeel Azmi	Harish Sagane	Arnab Dutta	4:37
2.	"Kuch Iss Tarah"	Shakeel Azmi	Harish Sagane	Arnab Dutta	5:48
3.	"Yaara"	Shakeel Azmi	Harish Sagane	Arnab Dutta	6:09
4.	"Tere Bina"	Raqueeb Alam	Asad Khan	Arijit Singh, Aakanksha Sharma	4:11
5.	"Aanewale Kal"	Shakeel Azmi	Harish Sagane	Rahul Jain	5:12
6.	"Aggressive Piano Theme"	Pranit Mawale	Pranit Mawale	Pranit Mawale	1:37
7.	"Main Piano Theme"	Harish Sagane	Harish Sagane	Harish Sagane	1:50
8.	"Crowd Gathering"	Harish Sagane	Harish Sagane	Harish Sagane	2:02
9.	"Piano Theme"	Harish Sagane	Harish Sagane	Harish Sagane	2:04
10.	"Jannat se Aagey"			Quratulain Balouch and Shuja Haider	4:32
Total length:					33:30

== Critical reception ==
1921 received mostly negative reviews from critics upon its theatrical release.

Devesh Sharma of Filmfare gave the movie 2 out of 5 stars and wrote, "Vikram Bhatt has made an unintentionally funny film. He perhaps needs to go back to the drawing board before he takes up horror as a subject once more".

Reza Noorani of The Times of India gave the movie 2 out of 5 stars calling it "a slow-moving film without any real chills".

Shikta Sanyal of Koimoi gave the movie 2 out of 5 stars stating, "This Vikram Bhatt Film Is A Mixed Bag With Too Many Loose Ends"."

Udita Jhunjhunwala of Firstpost gave the movie 1.5 out of 5 stars stating, "Vikram Bhatt adds every horror trope to this ghastly film, but none of them work".

Urvi Parikh of Rediff.com gave the movie 1.5 out of 5 stars stating, "The terrible acting leaves you more amused than scared".

Rahul Desai of Film Companion gave the movie 1 out of 5 stars saying that it uses the same old tropes of haunted mansions and incoherent ghosts with deafening sound effects.
