= Sunny and Inder Bawra =

Duo Indian music composer

Sunny Bawra and Inder Bawra are an Indian music composer duo active in films and television.

== Personal information ==
Inderjeet Singh Bawra and Paramjeet Singh "Sunny" Bawra are the sons of Major Singh Bawra. They were born and raised in Bhatinda, Punjab. The elder of the two, Inder, moved to Mumbai in April 2000. He had shown an interest in music since childhood. Later, younger brother Sunny joined him there (2004). They started composing music for various shows. They composed music for several TV shows: Meera 2009 TV series on NDTV Imagine TV, Devon Ke Dev...Mahadev on Life OK, Maharana Partap on Sony, Buddhaa-Rajaon Ka Raja, Jai Shree Krishna on Colors. Veer Shivaji, Ashoka, Navya, Siya ke Ram, Haatim, Jhaansi ki rani. Sankatmochan Mahabali Hanuman, Vighanharta Ganesha on Sony.

== Discography ==
=== Movies Songs and Background Score ===
- 2013 - Ankur Arora Murder Case (1 song)
- 2014 - Hate Story 2 (Background Score)
- 2015 - Hate Story 3 (Background Score)
- 2016 - Rocky Handsome (Songs and Background Score)
- 2016 - Wajah Tum Ho (Background Score)
- 2016 - Madaari
- 2016 - Ambarsariya (Background Score)
- 2016 - Kaptaan (Background Score)
- 2017 - Jora 10 Numbaria (Title Song & Background Score)
- 2018 - Badhaai Ho (1 song)
- 2018 - Hate Story 4 (Background Score)
- 2018 - Rang Punjab (Background Score)
- 2019 - ‘’Hotel Mumbai’’ (Humein Bharat Kahte hai)
- 2020 - Jora - The Second Chapter (Background Score)
- 2020 - Hacked (Tujhe Hasil Karunga)
- 2020 - Aashram (All Songs) on MX Player Directed by Prakash Jha
- 2021 - The Girl on the Train (2 Songs)
- 2025 - Ground Zero (1 song)

=== Non Film Songs ===
- 2019 - B for Bhangra on Zee Music
- 2019 - Whatsapp Song Zee Music
- 2019 - Tik Tok Zee Music
- 2019 - Rula Ke Gaya Ishq Zee Music
- 2020 - Dil Laya Dimaag Laya Zee Music
- 2020 - Shopping Kara Dunga Zee Music
- 2020 - Teri Baat Aur Hai Zee Music
- 2020 - Challon Ka Nishaan, Zee Music

=== Awards and nominations ===
Won the Indian Telly Award in the Year 2015 for Raziya Sultan on &TV.

Won the Jio Filmfare Award Punjabi 2018 for the Best Background Score for Jora 10 Numbaria.
