= Imagine TV =

Hindi-language television channel

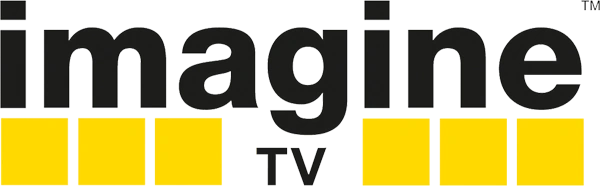
- Country: India
- Broadcast area: Worldwide
- Headquarters: Mumbai, Maharashtra, India

Programming
- Picture format: 576i

Ownership
- Owner: Turner Broadcasting System (Time Warner)
- Parent: Turner Asia Pacific Ventures
- Sister channels: Lumiere Movies

History
- Launched: 21 January 2008; 18 years ago
- Closed: 11 May 2012; 14 years ago
- Former names: NDTV Imagine (21 January 2008 – 7 March 2010)

Imagine TV was a Hindi general entertainment channel owned by Turner Broadcasting System, and based in New Delhi.

== History ==
=== Launch ===
The channel was established by NDTV Group under the stewardship of former STAR India CEO Sameer Nair. The channel was launched in India on 21 January 2008 as NDTV Imagine. Imagine TV tied up with Karan Johar, the creative consultant and ambassador of the Imagine TV brand. The channel was originally launched by NDTV in partnership with NBCUniversal but NBCUniversal left the partnership in October 2009.

In December 2009, online and mobile video service NyooTV agreed a deal with NDTV Imagine to distribute ongoing and past TV shows on the platform.

=== Sale to Turner ===
On 8 December 2009, it was announced that Turner Asia Pacific Ventures (a wholly owned subsidiary of Turner Broadcasting System) had acquired a 92% stake in NDTV Imagine Ltd. NDTV's 76 percent stake in NDTV Imagine would be given to Turner for $67 million, and the Time Warner company would acquire fresh equity worth $50 million to get 92% control. NDTV Imagine Ltd. ran NDTV Imagine, NDTV Lumiere and NDTV Imagine Showbiz television channels and film production transfer of shares, amounting to 85.68% of NDTV Imagine Ltd, by NDTV Networks Plc to Turner Asia Pacific Ventures. The three channels will be under Turner General Entertainment Networks, a holding company that will infuse fresh capital to fund the network's growth. The 'NDTV' brand was dropped and the channels were relabelled Imagine TV, Lumiere Movies and Imagine Showbiz. Imagine Showbiz was sold in January 2011 to Reliance Broadcast Network.

=== Shutdown ===
Imagine TV has not performed and grown as per expectations. While some programmes delivered satisfactory ratings, overall the channel was unable to achieve the rating consistency needed to sustain the business and support continued investment. As a result, Turner made the carefully considered decision to cease operations of the channel. We are grateful to the Imagine team, which includes some of the most talented and creative people in the Indian media industry. We will use our best endeavors to make this as smooth a transition as possible for them.

— Siddharth Jain, MD – South Asia, Turner International India

On 12 April 2012, it was announced that Imagine TV would close, as the channel struggled for ratings amidst competition from rival Hindi entertainment channels, where it was even beaten by the newly launched Life OK. The channel faced the same fate for its sister channel Real. Although all of its business operations will close with immediate effect, the channel will continue to air reruns from 13 April, until official obligations ended and it could cease transmissions completely.

Imagine TV shut down by 12 May 2012 in India, with the channel removed from all operators. Imagine TV's website was also closed and all episodes and promos were deleted from its YouTube channel.

In the Middle East Imagine closed on 30 May 2012, when the channel was replaced by Imagine Movies. The UK and Irish feed of Imagine Dil Se closed on 6 July 2012. The channel's Sky EPG slot was purchased by Viacom 18 to launch Rishtey, a free-to-air sister channel for Colors TV.

In 2015, 2 years following the shutdown of Imagine TV, their most of its old shows were migrated and acquired by another Hindi entertainment channel Dangal TV which makes the channel to become a No. 1 hindi entertainment channel.

== International availability ==
In the UK and Ireland, Imagine TV is broadcast on the Sky platform, where it is free-to-air. Due to copyright issues, the channel was unable to use 'Imagine TV' in the region, therefore it was rebranded as Imagine Dil Se, from NDTV Imagine, on 1 November 2010. The feed proved to be a success, beating Star Plus in the UK ratings to become the most watched Asian channel.

From 4 February 2009 Imagine was available in the US on the Dish Network platform. Imagine was also available free-to-air on Nilesat in the Middle East. In November 2009, NDTV Imagine launched in Canada in partnership with Canadian broadcaster Ethnic Channels Group and is available on Bell Satellite TV. The channel was rebranded as Imagine Dil Se in early 2011. The channel was also aired in parts of Asia Pacific viz- Fiji, Australia, Japan, Malaysia, apart from Nepal and Bangladesh.
