= Nazir Hussain filmography =

Filmography for the Indian actor Nazir Hussain, who has acted in more than 500 films. The list below is incomplete.

== Filmography ==
Year	Film	Role	Notes
1950	Pehla Aadmi	Dr. Vijay Kumar	Also story writer and dialogue writer
1953	Parineeta	Gurucharandas	
1953	Jeewan Jyoti	Dr. Abdul Hamid	Credited as Nazir Husain
1953	Do Bigha Zamin	A rickshaw-puller	
1954	Samaj		
1954	Darwaza		
1954	Baap Beti		
1955	Devdas	Dharamdas	
1955	Bandish	Mahender	
1955	Teen Bhai		
1955	Amanat	Purshottam	
1956	New Delhi	Lala Daulatram Khanna	
1956	Inspector	Thakur Mahendra Singh	
1956	Aawaz	Mr. Bhatnagar "Masterji"	
1957	Zamana		
1957	Naya Daur	Seth Maganlal	
1957	Musafir	Madhav	
1957	Mai Baap		
1957	Do Roti	Ramesh	
1958	Yahudi	Brutus	
1958	Raagini	Rajan's father	
1958	Ek Shola	Rai Bahadur Ishwardas	
1958	Parvarish	Thakur Jaswant Singh	
1958	Panchayat		Credited as Nazir Husein
1958	Kala Pani	Inspector Mehta	
1958	Aakhri Dao	Dharamdas	
1959	Raat Ke Rahi	James	
1959	Nai Raahen		
1959	Main Nashe Men Hoon	Dharamdas Khanna	
1959	Kangan	Barrister Mohan Das	
1959	Insan Jaag Utha	Lakshmandas	
1959	Fashionable Wife	Bihari	Credited as Nazir Husein
1959	Santan	Jagannath	
1960	Parakh	Postmaster Nivaran	
1960	Bombai Ka Babu	Shahji	
1960	Shriman Satyawadi	Champalal	Credited as Nazir Hussein
1960	Girl Friend		
1961	Aas Ka Panchhi	Nihalchand Khanna	
1961	Anuradha	Nazir Hussein	
1961	Chhaya	Jagat Narayan Choudhary	
1961	Gunga Jumna	Police Superintendent	Credited as Nazir Husain
1961	Passport	Bhagwandas	Credited as Nazir Husain
1961	Wanted		
1961	Main Aur Mera Bhai		
1961	Chhote Nawab	Nawab Nazir Hussain	
1962	Dr. Vidya		
1962	Rungoli	Sewakram	
1962	Sahib Bibi Aur Ghulam	Suvinay Babu (Jaba's father)	Credited as Nazir Husein
1962	Anpadh	Thakur Mahendra Nath	
1962	Ganga Maiyya Tohe Piyari Chadhaibo		Bhojpuri film
1962	Asli-Naqli	Dwarkadas	
1962	Apna Banake Dekho		
1963	Dil Hi To Hai	Khan Bahadur	Credited as Nazir Husain
1963	Laagi Nahi Chhute Ram	Sukkhu	Bhojpuri film
1963	Bahurani	Zamindar	
1963	Hamrahi	Public Prosecutor Dharamdas	
1964	Kashmir Ki Kali	Dinu	
1964	Leader	Vijay Khanna's father	Credited as Nazir Husain
1964	Suhagan	Dubey	
1964	Aap Ki Parchhaiyan	Dinanath Chopra	
1964	Ayee Milan Ki Bela	Mr. Choudhry	
1964	Main Suhagan Hoon		
1964	Shagoon	Rai Sahib	
1964	Ganga Ki Lahren	Diwan Sahib	
1965	Arzoo	Diwan Kishan Kishor	
1965	Mere Sanam	Mr. Mehra	
1965	Purnima	Rattan Lal	
1965	Rishte Naahte	Thakur Narendra Pal Singh	
1965	Bhoot Bungla	Shyamlal	Credited as Nazir Husain
1966	Do Dilon Ki Dastaan		
1966	Chhota Bhai	Zamindar Thakur Pratap Singh Mindal	
1966	Mohabbat Zindagi Hai	Advocate Sinha	
1966	Tasveer		
1966	Preet Na Jane Reet	Ashok's father	
1967	Jewel Thief	Police Commissioner	
1967	Ram Aur Shyam	Anjana's father	
1967	Chandan Ka Palna	Harikishan Rai	Credited as Nazir Husain
1967	Palki	Jafferbhai Godiwala	Credited as Nazir Husain
1967	Hare Kanch Ki Chooriyan	Professor Kishanlal Saxena	
1967	Shagird	Ramesh's father	
1967	Hamare Gam Se Mat Khelo		
1968	Baazi	Father Gonsalves	
1968	Dil Aur Mohabbat	Police Commissioner G.P. Varma	Credited as Nazir Hussein
1968	Sadhu Aur Shaitaan	Bank Manager (as Nazir Hussain)	
1968	Ankhen	Diwan Chand alias Major Saab	
1968	Aulad	Dinu	
1969	Chirag	Washerman	
1969	Tamanna		
1969	Madhavi	Chola Naresh's Maharaja	
1969	Aya Sawan Jhoom Ke	Lala Jugal Kishore	
1969	Jaal Saaz	Dwarkanath	
1969	Jahan Pyar Mile		
1969	Badi Didi	Father	
1970	Prem Pujari	Retd. General Durgaprasad Bakshi	
1970	Abhinetri	Dr. Niranjan Das	
1970	Geet	Dindayal	
1970	Kati Patang	Diwan Dinanath	
1970	Khamoshi	Dr. Colonel Saab	
1970	Humjoli	Roopa's father	
1970	Samaj Ko Badal Dalo	Satyanarayan	
1971	Sharmeelee	Father Joseph	
1971	Bikhare Moti	Ram Prakash	
1971	Main Sunder Hoon	The Director (directing Waheeda Rehman)	Uncredited
1971	Lakhon Mein Ek	Dindayal	
1971	Lagan	Sewakram	
1971	Preet Ki Dori	Madhav Chaudhary	
1972	Sanjog	Seema's father	
1972	Bombay to Goa	Atmaram	Credited as Nazir Husain
1972	Lalkar	Colonel Choudhury	
1972	Anuraag	Anu's Father	
1972	Mere Jeevan Saathi	Lalaji (as Nazir Husain)	Credited as Nazir Husain
1972	Mome Ki Gudiya	Diwan Kriparam	Credited as Nazir Husain
1972	Wafaa	Charandas	
1972	Munimji		
1972	Mangetar		
1973	Jugnu	Shyam's father	Credited as Nazir Husain
1973	Jwar Bhata	Durga Das Prasad	
1973	Heera	Magistrate (Heera's father)	
1973	Anokhi Ada	Lalaji (as Nazir Hussain)	
1973	Mere Gharib Nawaz	Mirza Baig	Credited as Nazir Husain
1974	Prem Nagar	Lata's father	
1974	Kunwara Baap	Principal of Bishop Cotton Junior College	
1974	Dulhan	Munsib	
1974	Pocket Maar	Mr. Rai	
1975	Dharmatma	Zaheera's father	
1975	Qaid	Rai Bahadur Tulsinath	
1975	Pratigya	Sepoy Shivcharan	
1975	Mere Sartaj	Parveen's father	
1975	Dhoti Lota Aur Chowpatty	Girdharilal Paniwala	
1976	Charas	Brindaban	
1976	Mehbooba	Guruji	
1976	Tapasya	Professor Sinha	
1976	Daaj		
1976	Sangram	Girdharilal	Credited as Nazir Husain
1976	Bairaag	Pujari	
1977	Amar Akbar Anthony	Catholic Priest	
1977	Dhoop Chhaon	Choudhary	
1977	Pandit Aur Pathan	Roopa's blind dad	
1977	Agent Vinod	Ashok Saxena (Anju's father)	Credited as Nazir Husain
1977	Ram Bharose	Ratanchand	
1977	Aafat	Din Dayal	
1978	Bhookh	Maulvi	
1978	Karmayogi	Catholic Priest	
1978	Nishan	Doctor	
1978	Sone Ka Dil Lohe Ke Haath	Balkishan	
1979	Aakhri Kasam	Mangal	
1980	The Burning Train	Mr. Verma (Vinod's father)	
1980	Abdullah	Blind man	
1980	Teen Ekkey		
1980	Roos Gailen Saiyen Hamaar		Also Director
1981	Fiffty Fiffty	Mary's foster father	
1981	Walayati Babu	Subedaar	
1982	Rajput	Police Commissioner Siddheshwar Singh	
1982	Meharbaani		Credited as Nazir Husain
1982	Dharam Kanta	Priest	Credited as Nazir Husain
1983	Mazdoor	Sinha	
1983	Daulat Ke Dushman	Ramlal	
1983	Jeevan Sukh		
1984	Sardaar	Dr. Syed	
1986	Love and God	Emir-E-Yemen	
1987	Vali-E-Azam	Emir-E-Yemen	
1991	Iraada	Mr. Sharma	Posthumous release
1994	Pain		Posthumous release
