= Chacha Zindabad =

1959 film directed by J. Om Prakash

- Directed by: J. Om Prakash
- Written by: Om Prakash, Jagdish Kanwal
- Produced by: J. Om Prakash
- Starring: Kishore Kumar; Anoop Kumar; Anita Guha; Om Prakash; Tun Tun; Raj Mehra; Bhagwan Dada
- Music by: Madan Mohan
- Release date: 1959
- Country: India
- Language: Hindi

Chacha Zindabad is a 1959 Indian comedy and drama film directed by J. Om Prakash and starring Kishore Kumar, Anita Guha and Tun Tun and Om Prakash.

== Plot ==
The protagonist is portrayed as a Westernized individual whose parents wish for him to marry a traditional girl, played by Anita Guha. The character is depicted as a freak, contrasting sharply with his prospective bride, who is good at classical dance and music. The two characters enter into a pact to show their disapproval of each other to their parents. They gradually develop genuine feelings for each other and fall in love.

== Cast ==
- Kishore Kumar
- Anita Guha
- Om Prakash
- Anoop Kumar
- Bhagwan Dada
- Raj Mehra
- Sunder
- Tun Tun
- Manorama
- Rammohan Sharma
- Gajanan Jagirdar
- Keshav Rana
- Edwina

== Production ==
Chacha Zindabad was produced and directed by Om Prakash. Anita Guha starred as the heroine. The film was produced under Om Prakash's own banner "Light and Shade". Anoop Kumar played a supporting role in the film.

== Music ==
Music was by Madan Mohan. In an interview, Lata Mangeshkar recalled an experience from her career. Following the recording of a song which featured a classical singer adopting a ramba-samba style to attract her boyfriend, she suggested that the song be sung by someone else, as she didn't enjoy the recording process. After some initial protests from Om Prakash, he ultimately agreed to her request and the song was later sung by Asha Bhosle.

Track listing

All lyrics are written by Rajendra Krishan.

No.	Title	Singer(s)	Length
1.	"Preetam Daras Dikhao (Raga Lalit)" (version 1)	Lata Mangeshkar, Manna Dey	4:53
2.	"Ae Haseeno Nazneeno"	Kishore Kumar	5:52
3.	"Jao Ji Jao Tumhein Maan Liya Saiyan"	Asha Bhosle	4:45
4.	"Bach Gaye Hum Dono Phanste Phanste (Tera Mera Chacha ZIndabad)"	Lata Mangeshkar, Kishore Kumar	6:12
5.	"Nazren Utha Ke Zara Dekh Le"	Asha Bhosle	4:02
6.	"Des Chhudaye Bhes Chhudaye"	Kishore Kumar	7:19
7.	"Bairan Neend Na Aaye (Raga Kafi)"	Lata Mangeshkar	3:14
8.	"Badi Cheez Hai Pyar Mohabbat"	Kishore Kumar, Lata Mangeshkar	3:22

== Reception ==
Outlook recalls a scene during which the character played Kishore Kunar climbs a water tank while being drunk as a symbol of the "free spirit" of the actor. Filmindia was very critical of the film and found it neither amusing nor intelligent. The film was however described as "a hilarious comedy" by Sathya Sara and Abrar Alvi. According to Silhouette Magazine, the movie was a hit in 1959.
