= List of Hindi films of the 1980s =

A list of films produced by the Bollywood film industry based in Mumbai in the 1980s:

Title	Director	Cast	Genre	Notes
1980
Naseeb	Manmohan Desai	Amitabh Bachchan, Shatrughna Sinha, Rishi Kapoor, Hema, Reena Roy	Drama	
aan aur shaan			Drama	
Aakrosh				

Title	Director	Cast	Genre	Notes
1981
Aakhri Mujra			Drama	
			Drama	

|

Title	Director	Cast	Genre	Notes
1983
Coolie		Amitabh Bachchan, Rishi Kapoor, Kader Khan	Drama	

Title	Director	Cast	Genre	Notes
1984
Aan Aur Shaan			Drama	
			Drama	

Title	Director	Cast	Genre	Notes
1985
Aakhir Kyon?			Drama	
Aar Paar				

Title	Director	Cast	Genre	Notes
1986
Aakhree Raasta			Drama	

Title	Director	Cast	Genre	Notes
1987
7 Saal Baad			Drama	
			Drama	

Title	Director	Cast	Genre	Notes
1988
Adhikar			Drama	
Aakhri Adaalat			Drama	

Title	Director	Cast	Genre	Notes
1989
Aakhri Baazi			Drama	
Aakhri Badla			Drama	
Aadat				

== See also ==
- Bollywood
- List of highest-grossing Bollywood films
- List of highest-grossing Indian films in overseas markets
- Category:Lists of Hindi films by year
