= Aarti (film) =

1962 film

- Poster
- Directed by: Phani Majumdar
- Screenplay by: Vishwamitter Adil
- Based on: Sanskar Lakshmi by Prafulla Desai
- Produced by: Tarachand Barjatya
- Starring: Ashok Kumar; Meena Kumari; Pradeep Kumar; Shashikala
- Cinematography: Pandurang Naik
- Edited by: G. G. Mayekar
- Music by: Roshan
- Production company: Rajshri Productions
- Release date: 10 August 1962
- Running time: 156 minutes
- Country: India
- Language: Hindi
- Box office: ₹75 lakh

Aarti is a 1962 Indian Hindi-language film directed by Phani Majumdar and produced by Tarachand Barjatya. The film stars Meena Kumari in the title role of Aarti, with Ashok Kumar, Pradeep Kumar and Shashikala appearing in pivotal roles. It is based on Sanskar Lakshmi, a play written by Prafulla Desai.

== Plot ==
An unemployed young man named Deepak saves Aarti Gupta, a hardworking and dedicated doctor, from drowning, and the two eventually fall in love with each other, although her parents have already engaged her to marry Dr. Prakash. Although Aarti's father firmly disapproves of this relationship, Deepak and Aarti marry. She moves in with him and his family, which includes his father, elder brother, Niranjan (Ramesh Deo), sister-in-law, Jaswanti and their three children. Prakash (Aarti's former fiancé) happens to be a friend of this family, as also of Aarti's natal family, and he keeps up his visits to both families. This brings a discord in Aarti's marital life, so much so that Deepak asks her to leave, and she returns to her father's house. This is followed by Deepak having a serious accident, when Prakash is the only surgeon who can operate on him. He agrees to operate on him only if Aarti promises to come back to him and forget her husband.

== Cast ==
- Meena Kumari as Dr Aarti Gupta
- Ashok Kumar as Dr. Prakash
- Pradeep Kumar as Deepak
- Shashikala as Jaswanti
- Rajendra Nath as Jivan
- Keshto Mukherjee as Johnny
- Jagirdar as Deepak's dad
- Peace Kanwal as Ramola
- Mehmood as Kumar
- Chandrima Bhaduri as Sarla's mom
- Ramesh Deo as Niranjan

== Awards ==
Aarti received two nominations at the 1963 annual Filmfare Awards, and won one award. Shashikala won her first Filmfare Award. It was the year when Meena Kumari made a record by having all the three nominations for Best Actress to her credit. She eventually won for Sahib Bibi Aur Ghulam. The Bengal Film Journalists' Association acknowledged Aarti as the ninth-best Indian film of the year, and gave it three additional competitive awards. Nominations are listed below.

10th Filmfare Awards:

Won

- Best Supporting Actress – Shashikala

Nominated

- Best Actress – Meena Kumari

Other awards

- Won, BFJA Award for Best Actress (Hindi) – Meena Kumari
- Won, BFJA Award for Best Supporting Actress (Hindi) – Shashikala
- Won, BFJA Award for Best Audiography (Hindi) – R.G. Pushalkar

== Music ==
The music for this film is composed by Roshan, with lyrics by Majrooh Sultanpuri.

Track listing
No.	Title	Singer(s)	Length
1.	"Bane Ho Ek Khaak Se"	Lata Mangeshkar	4:32
2.	"Kabhi To Milegi, Kahin To Milegi" (Raga Pahadi)	Lata Mangeshkar	3:56
3.	"Ab Kya Misaal Doon Main Tumhare Shabaab Ki" (Raga Khamaj)	Mohammed Rafi	3:53
4.	"Aapne Yaad Dilaaya To Mujhe Yaad Aaya" (Raga Manj Khamaj)	Lata Mangeshkar, Mohammed Rafi	3:29
5.	"Baar Baar Tohe Kya Samjhaaye Paayal Ki Jhankaar" (Raga Khamaj)	Lata Mangeshkar, Mohammed Rafi	6:45
6.	"Na Bhanwara Na Koi Gul"	Asha Bhosle, Mohammed Rafi	2:11
7.	"Woh Teer Dil Pe Chala"	Asha Bhosle, Mohammed Rafi	5:12
Total length:			29:59
