= Ek Jhalak =

- Directed by: Kalidas Batabyal
- Produced by: Deep Khosla; Pradeep Kumar
- Starring: Pradeep Kumar; Vyjayanthimala; Rajendra Kumar; Anita Guha
- Music by: Hemant Kumar
- Production companies: Deep & Pradeep Productions
- Release date: 1957
- Country: India
- Language: Hindi

Ek Jhalak is a 1957 Bollywood film starring Pradeep Kumar, Rajendra Kumar, Vyjayanthimala, Anita Guha in lead roles.

== Cast ==
- Pradeep Kumar
- Rajendra Kumar
- Vyjayanthimala
- Anita Guha

== Music ==
S. H. Bihari had penned the lyrics while Hemant Kumar had composed the music.

Song	Singer
"Yeh Hawa, Yeh Fiza"	Lata Mangeshkar
"Kis Liye Mathe Pe Bal Hai"	Geeta Dutt
"Aaja Zara, Aaja Zara Mere Dil Ke Sahare Dilruba"	Geeta Dutt, Hemant Kumar
"Gori Chori Chori Jana"	Hemant Kumar
"Baharen Bhi Dekhi, Nazaren Bhi Dekhi, Jo Dil Chahta"	Hemant Kumar, Asha Bhosle
"Yeh Hansta Hua Karvan Zindagi Ka Na Poochho"	Hemant Kumar, Asha Bhosle
"Chal Badalon Se Aage Kuch Aur Hi Sama Hai"	Hemant Kumar, Asha Bhosle
"O Jal Mein Rehnewali"	Hemant Kumar, Asha Bhosle
"Aaya Kaun Meri Mehfil Mein"	Asha Bhosle
