= Bheegi Raat =

1965 film by Kalidas

- Poster
- Directed by: Kalidas
- Written by: Kalidas
- Produced by: Kalidas
- Starring: Ashok Kumar; Meena Kumari; Pradeep Kumar
- Cinematography: A. Bhattacharjee
- Edited by: D. N. Pai
- Music by: Roshan
- Release date: 5 August 1965
- Running time: 157 mins
- Language: Hindi
- Box office: ₹70 lakh (equivalent to ₹47 crore or US$4.9 million in 2023)

Bheegi Raat (transl. A rainy night) is a 1965 Bollywood film produced and directed by Kalidas. The film was a semi hit at the box office.

Roshan was the music director. Hit songs from the movie include 'Dil Jo Na Keh Saka' sung by Mohammed Rafi and Lata Mangeshkar in two different versions and 'Aise To Na Dekho Ki' sung by Suman Kalyanpur and Mohammed Rafi.

The movie was a remake of the 1957 American movie An Affair to Remember which in turn was a remake of the 1939 movie Love Affair. This film inspired the 1999 film Mann starring Aamir Khan and Manisha Koirala.

== Plot ==
Neelima (Meena Kumari) falls afoul of a greedy uncle, who wants to make quick money by selling her to the highest bidder. After a stormy escape, she's found in a ditch by Pushpa (Kamini Kaushal), an invalid and guardian to absent brother Anand's (Ashok Kumar) daughter. Neelima sticks around and soon has charge of the household and the kid.

Back in Bombay, Ajay (Pradeep Kumar) is the artistic layabout son of a wealthy industrialist, and is targeted for marriage by a scheming socialite, Vinita (Shashikala). After rebuffing her, he earns the wrath of her father, and his own. Ajay decides to run from it all, presumably with the help of his secret trust fund, off to paint in Nainital. Soon enough, Ajay starts meeting Neelima at various occasions in Nainital and eventually both of them start loving each other.

On the other hand, Anand also falls for Neelima not only because of her uncanny resemblance to his dead wife but also her caring and affectionate attitude towards his daughter. Neelima, who lives in Anand's house is torn between her love for Ajay and respect for Anand soon confesses her dilemma to Anand. Vinita, the spurned lover is seeking revenge from Ajay and soon gets an opportunity when Neelima gets injured in an accident. Ajay misinterprets the situation unknown to the fact that she actually has met with an accident and is filled with hatred for her.

By the end of the film, Anand who is all set to marry Neelima backs out at the last minute giving way to her marriage with Ajay. Neelima and Ajay unite and Anand goes back to London leaving his daughter in the custody of Neelima.

== Cast ==
- Ashok Kumar as Anand
- Pradeep Kumar as Ajay
- Meena Kumari as Neelima
- Kamini Kaushal as Pushpa
- Shashikala as Vinita
- Rajendra Nath as Pritam
- I. S. Johar as Jhootlingam
- Hari Shivdasani as Colonel Bhim Singh
- Anoop Kumar as Kunwar
- Persis Khambatta
- Moni Chatterjee as Vinita's Father
- Ulhas as Dwarkadas
- Raj Mehra as Thakur Sahab
- Achala Sachdev
- Mridula Rani as Club member
- Rajan Kapoor as Sheth Ramdas
- Baby Irani as Munni
- Poonam as Nurse
- Sushma Shiromani
- Edwina

== Crew ==
- Director & Story – Kalidas
- Producer – Kalidas
- Dialogues & Screenplay – Ramesh Pant
- Cinematography – A. Bhattacharjee
- Music – Roshan
- Lyrics – Majrooh Sultanpuri
- Editing – D. N. Pai
- Art Direction – Shantidas
- Playback Singers –Lata Mangeshkar, Mohammed Rafi, Asha Bhosle, Suman Kalyanpur

== Soundtrack ==
Bheegi Raat

Soundtrack album by Roshan
- Recorded: Unknown
- Genre: Film soundtrack
- Producer: Kalidas

Roshan chronology
'Bedaag' (1965)	Bheegi Raat (1965)	'Mamta' (1966)

Song	Singer
"Dil Jo Na Keh Saka"	Lata Mangeshkar
"Dil Jo Na Keh Saka"	Mohammed Rafi
"Mohabbat Se Dekha"	Mohammed Rafi
"Jaane Woh Kaun Hai"	Mohammed Rafi
"Aise To Na Dekho Ke Bahek Jaaye Kahin Hum"	Mohammed Rafi, Suman Kalyanpur
"Tu Mera Jo Nahin"	Asha Bhosle
