= Pyar Ki Rahen =

1959 film by Lekhraj Bhakri

Pyar Ki Rahen is a 1959 Indian romantic tragedy drama film directed by Lekhraj Bhakri starring Pradeep Kumar and Anita Guha.

== Cast ==
- Pradeep Kumar
- Anita Guha
- Helen
- Jeevan
- Kuldip Kaur

== Soundtrack ==
1. "Do Roz Mein woh Pyar Ka Aalam Ujad Gaya" - Mukesh
2. "Tum Se Door Chale, Hum Mazbur Chale" - Hemant Kumar, Lata Mangeshkar
3. "Dekho Ji Akeli Aaya Jaaya Na Karo, Yun Banke Sawaar Ke Tadpaaya Na Karo" - Geeta Dutt, Mohammed Rafi
4. "Gharwale Ghar Nahin, Humen Kisi Ka Dar Nahin" - Geeta Dutt, Mohammed Rafi
5. "Gori Gori Baahen Tikhi Tikhi Hai Yeh Nigahen" - Asha Bhosle
6. "Hum Bhi Is Duniya Mein Kya Taqdeer Lekar Aaye Hai" - Asha Bhosle
