= Mome Ki Gudiya =

- Directed by: Mohan Kumar
- Produced by: Mohan Kumar
- Starring: Tanuja; Premnath; Om Prakash; Nazir Hussain
- Music by: Laxmikant Pyarelal
- Release date: 1972
- Country: India
- Language: Hindi

Mome Ki Gudiya is a 1972 Indian Hindi-language film produced and directed by Mohan Kumar. The film stars Ratan Chopra, Tanuja, Premnath, Jeevan, Om Prakash and Nazir Hussain. The music is by Laxmikant Pyarelal and the lyrics by Anand Bakshi.

== Plot ==
Ravi, the only son of wealthy widower Rai Bahadur Gangaram, falls in love with fellow-collegian, Sheel, but is shocked to find that she is to be his future step-mother. His father decides to step away, lets the couple get married, and shortly thereafter passes away. A few months later, Sheel gets pregnant and her parents as well as her maternal uncle, Salikram, come to visit her. It is during this visit that Ravi will find out that Sheel has been living a secret life, and the real reason why she married him. Devastated, he will face even more trauma and scandal when the Police will arrest his wife for murder.

== Cast ==
- Ratan Chopra
- Tanuja
- Premnath
- Jeevan
- Om Prakash
- Tun Tun
- Raj Mehra
- Rashid Khan
- Nazir Hussain
- Helen as cabaret dancer in song "Nainon Ki Gaadi Chali"

== Soundtrack ==
All songs were composed by Laxmikant–Pyarelal and written by Anand Bakshi.

1. "Baagon Mein Bahar Aayi" – Anand Bakshi, Lata Mangeshkar
2. "Ladki Punjab Di" – Mohammed Rafi
3. "Main Dhoondh Raha Tha" – Anand Bakshi
4. "Bandhan Toote Na" – Lata Mangeshkar
5. "Nainon Ki Gaadi Chali" – Asha Bhosle
