= Tonga-wali =

- Poster
- Directed by: Lekhraj Bhakri
- Starring: Balraj Sahni; Nirupa Roy; Shammi Kapoor; Anita Guha
- Music by: Salil Chowdhury
- Production company: Kuldip Pictures
- Release date: 1955
- Country: India
- Language: Hindi

Tongawali (transl. The Tonga Girl; also spelt as Tangawali and Tangewali) is a 1955 Indian Hindi-language drama film, directed by Lekhraj Bhakri and produced by Kuldip Pictures. The film stars Balraj Sahni, Nirupa Roy, Shammi Kapoor, Anita Guha. It was later remade in Tamil as Alli Petra Pillai (1959).

== Cast ==
- Balraj Sahni as Laxman
- Nirupa Roy as Rajjo
- Shammi Kapoor
- Anita Guha

== Production ==
Tonga-wali was produced by Kuldip Pictures and directed by Lekhraj Bhakri. Anita Guha made her acting debut with this film.

== Soundtrack ==
The music was composed by Salil Chowdhury with lyrics by Bharat Vyas and Prem Dhawan.

Track listing
No.	Title	Singer(s)	Length
1.	"Halke Halke Chalo Sanware"	Hemant Kumar, Lata Mangeshkar	3:08
2.	"Rim Jhim Jhim Badarwa Barse"	Lata Mangeshkar	2:39
3.	"Dekho Tanga Mera Nirala"	Mohammed Rafi	3:15
4.	"Dil Ke Sahare Jaan Se Pyare"	Lata Mangeshkar	3:16
5.	"Main Loot Gai Duniyawalo"	Lata Mangeshkar	3:11
6.	"Saiyan Beiman"	Lata Mangeshkar	3:15
7.	"Tere Nainon Ne Jadoo Dala"	Lata Mangeshkar, Mohammed Rafi	2:42
Total length:			21:26
