= Manaswini =

- Poster
- Directed by: P. Bhaskaran
- Screenplay by: Parappurath
- Based on: Sanskar Lakshmi by Prafulla Desai
- Produced by: Vasu Menon
- Starring: Sathyan; Madhu; Sarada; Sukumari
- Cinematography: E. N. Balakrishnan
- Edited by: K. Narayanan; K. Sankunni
- Music by: M. S. Baburaj
- Production company: Madras Movies
- Release date: 13 April 1968
- Country: India
- Language: Malayalam

Manaswini is a 1968 Indian Malayalam-language film, directed by P. Bhaskaran and written by Parappurath. The film stars Sathyan, Madhu, Sarada and Sukumari. It is based on Sanskar Lakshmi, a play written by Prafulla Desai. The film was released on 13 April 1960.

== Plot ==
The film explores a tragic love triangle, where the heroine, Malathi, must display immense mental strength, sacrifice, and dignity to navigate family pressures and protect her loved ones.

== Cast ==
- Sathyan
- Madhu
- Sharada
- Sukumari
- Thikkurissy Sukumaran Nair
- P. J. Antony
- Bahadoor
- C. A. Balan
- Khadeeja
- Meena
- Nellikode Bhaskaran

== Soundtrack ==
The music was composed by M. S. Baburaj and the lyrics were written by P. Bhaskaran.

Song	Singers
"Aaraadhikayude Poojaakusumam"	S. Janaki
"Kanneerum Swapnangalum"	K. J. Yesudas
"Muttivilikkunnu Vaathilil"	S. Janaki
"Paathiraavaayilla"	K. J. Yesudas, S. Janaki
"Thelinju Premayamunaveendum"	K. J. Yesudas
