= Bharat Bhushan =

Indian actor (1920 - 1992)

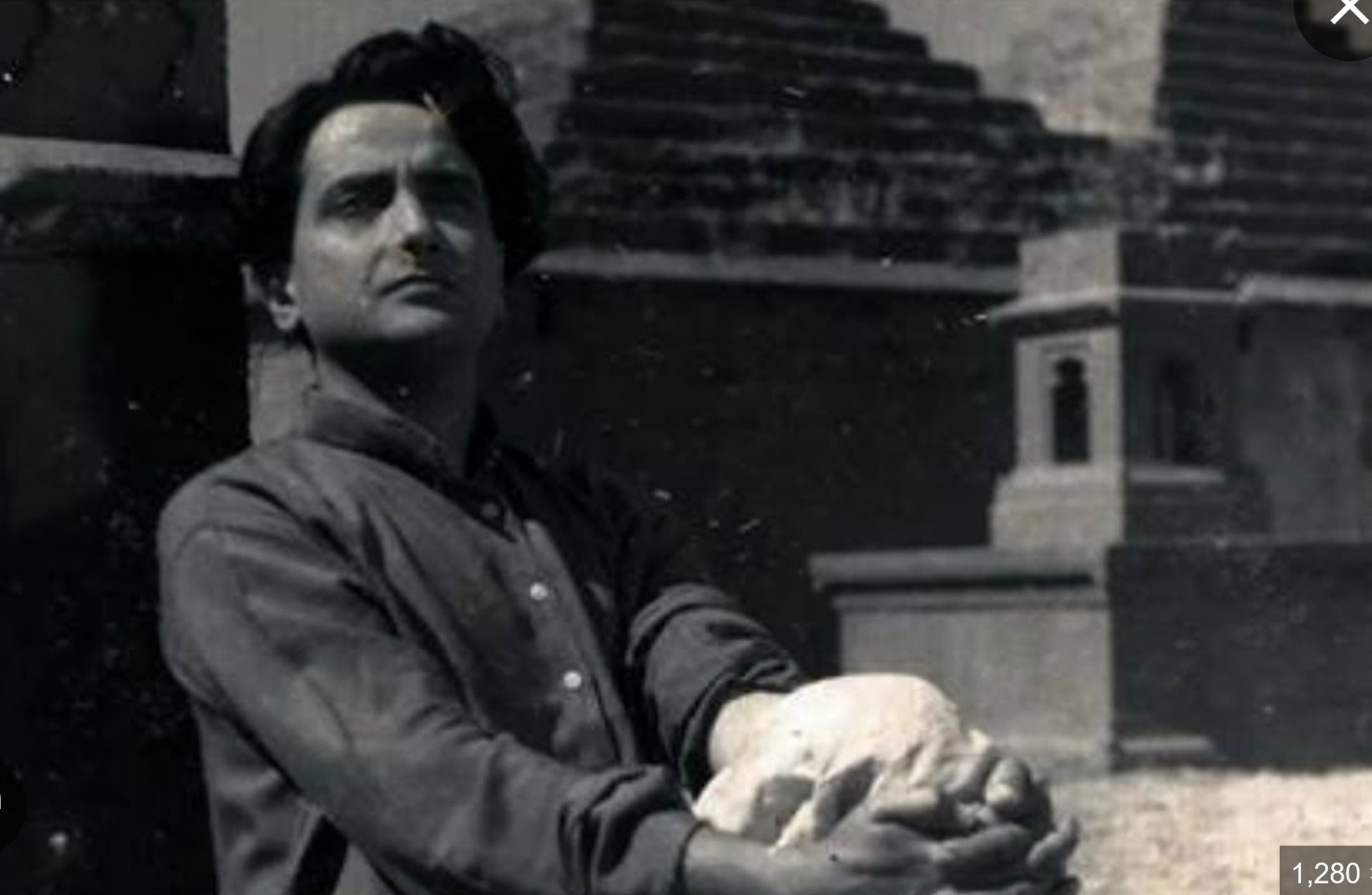
- Portrait of Bharat Bhushan
- Born: Bharatbhushan Gupta; 14 June 1920; Meerut, United Provinces of Agra and Oudh, British India (Present-day Uttar Pradesh, India)
- Died: 27 January 1992 (aged 71); Bombay, Maharashtra, India
- Occupation: Actor
- Years active: 1941–1992
- Spouse(s): Sarla Prakash (died 1954) Ratna Bhushan (m. 1967)
- Children: Anuradha Bhushan; Aparajita Bhushan
- Awards: Filmfare Best Actor Award (1955)

Bharatbhushan Gupta, better known as Bharat Bhushan (14 June 1920 – 27 January 1992) was an Indian actor in Hindi language films, scriptwriter and producer. He was born in Meerut, and brought up in Aligarh, Uttar Pradesh.

== Career ==
=== 1941–1962: Early career, rise to prominence and stardom ===
Bharat Bhushan began his career in 1941 with a small role in Kidar Sharma's superhit film Chitralekha. Despite this, his career didn't take off as his films apart from another Kidar Sharma's directional Suhaag Raat (1948) did not perform well commercially.

In 1952, he appeared and played the lead in Vijay Bhatt's musical romantic drama film Baiju Bawra. The film emerged a huge blockbuster at the box office and made Bhushan a bankable star. Its music by Naushad and songs by Mohammed Rafi, such as "Tu Ganga Ki Mauj Mein Jamana Ka Dhara", "O Duniya Ke Rakhwale Sunn Dard Bhare Mere Naaley" and "Man Tarpat Hari Darshan Ko Aaj" were also very successful and won Naushad the inaugural Filmfare Award for Best Music Director. The same year with two more successes, Maa and Anand Math, Bhushan further solidified his stardom. In 1953, he delivered another blockbuster and second highest earner of the year with Ladki, co-starring Vyjayanthimala, Kishore Kumar and Anjali Devi.

== Personal life ==
Bharat Bhushan was born as Bharat Raibahadur Motilal Gupta on 14 June 1920 in a Vaishya (Baniya) family at Meerut, Uttar Pradesh, India.

His father, Raibahadur Motilal, was the government pleader of Meerut and Supreme Court Judge, Allahabad. He had one older brother. His mother died when he was two years old. The brothers left for Aligarh to stay with their grandfather after their mother's death. He did his studies and earned a graduate degree from Dharam Samaj College, Aligarh. His elder brother was film producer and high court judge, Rameshchandra Gupta, who owned the Ideal Studio at Lucknow. After studies, he took to acting against his father's wishes. He first went to Kolkata to join cinema and later established himself in Bombay.

He married into a prominent family in Meerut, Zamindar Raibahadur Budha Prakash's daughter Sarla. They had two daughters, Anuradha (who had polio-associated complications) and Aparajita. Bhushan's wife Sarla died of labour complications on 12 November 1954 at 10 p.m. after delivering their second child. His film Meenar (1954) was dedicated to her where the above information regarding the date and time of her death was mentioned. In 1967, he married actress Ratna, his co-star from Barsaat Ki Raat. Ratna was a prominent actress who played the sister or friend of the heroine in many films. Among her notable TV appearances was the serial Trishna as mother of the four young girls. It was an adaptation of Pride and Prejudice. In an interview, his daughter Aparajita had said that after the sudden demise of her husband, she turned to acting. Aparajita has done more than 50 films and TV serials. She played the role of Mandodari in Ramanand Sagar's famous serial Ramayan.

Bhushan owned a bungalow in Bandra suburb of Bombay. This was the famous Aashirwad bungalow, which he sold to Rajendra Kumar, who in turn sold it to Rajesh Khanna. This bungalow, was thus home to 3 famous film stars. Bhushan was an avid reader and boasted of a fine collection of books, which he had to sell off like his cars and bungalows in bad times, after he turned co-producer at the instance of his brother. Only two of his films were successes and unfortunately, the rest flopped. He died after he escaped his financial crisis, on 27 January 1992.

== Filmography ==
Year	Title	Role	Notes
1941	Chitralekha		
1942	Bhakta Kabir		
1943	Bhaichara		
1945	Sawan		
1948	Suhaag Raat	Beli	
1949	Rangila Rajastan		
1949	Uddhār		
1949	Thes	Shyam	
1950	Ankhen		
1950	Bhai Bahen		
1950	Janmashtami		
1950	Kisi Ki Yaad		
1950	Ram Darshan		
1951	Hamari Shaan		
1951	Saagar		
1952	Baiju Bawra	Baiju	
1952	Maa	Bhanu	
1952	Anand Math	Mahendra	
1953	Pahli Shadi		
1953	Dana Pani		
1953	Farmaish		
1953	Ladki	Raja	
1953	Shuk Rambha		
1953	Shri Chaitanya Mahaprabhu	Vishvambhar Mishra / Chaitanya Mahaprabhu	Winner, Filmfare Award for Best Actor
1954	Shabaab	Rattan	
1954	Meenaar	Dinesh	Also Co-producer
1954	Pooja	Deepak	
1954	Kavi		
1954	Dhoop Chhaon		
1954	Aurat Teri Yehi Kahani		
1954	Mirza Ghalib	Mirza Ghalib	Nomination, Filmfare Award for Best Actor
1955	Amanat	Pradeep	
1956	Basant Bahar	Gopal	Also co-wrote the script
1957	Sakshi Gopal		
1957	Mera Saalam		
1957	Champakali	Madho	
1957	Gateway of India	Prakash	
1957	Rani Rupmati	Baz Bahadur	
1958	Samrat Chandragupt	Chandragupta Maurya	
1958	Phagun	Bijandra "Bijan"	
1958	Sohni Mahiwal	Mahiwal	
1959	Kal Hamara Hai	Bharat	
1959	Kavi Kalidas	Kalidas	
1959	Sawan	Sawant	
1960	Chand Mere Aaja	Shyam	
1960	Ghunghat	Dr. Gopal	
1960	Angulimaal	Ahinsak (Angulimaal)	
1960	Barsat Ki Rat	Amaan Hyderabadi alias Mirza Lucknowi	Also co-wrote the script
1962	Gyara Hazar Ladkian	Puran	
1962	Sangeet Samrat Tansen	Sangeet Shiromani / Sangeet Samrat Tansen "Tanu"	
1964	Jahan Ara	Mirza Yusuf Changezi	
1964	Chandi Ki Deewar		
1964	Dooj Ka Chand	Gopu	Also producer, co-wrote the script
1964	Vidyapati	Vidyapati	
1965	Naya Kanoon	Deepak	
1967	Taqdeer	Gopal	
1969	Pyar Ka Mausam	Gopal	
1969	Vishwas	Ramnath "Ram" Kapoor	
1972	Gomti Ke Kinare	Bharat	
1973	Kahani Kismat Ki	Doctor	
1975	Ranga Khush	Dilip Singh	
1977	Solah Shukrawar	Bhola Bhagat	
1977	Hira Aur Patthar	Tulsiram	
1977	Khoon Pasina	Kaka	
1977	Jai Dwarkadheesh		
1978	Nawab Sahib	Salma's father	
1978	Ganga Sagar	Pratap Singh (Padma's father)	
1980	Unees-Bees		
1981	Khara Khota		
1981	Yaarana	Komal's father	
1981	Commander		
1981	Umrao Jaan	Khan Saheb (music master)	
1983	Adi Shankaracharya	Kaippilly Shivaguru Nambudiri (Adi Shankara's father)	
1983	Nastik	Temple priest	
1983	Justice Chaudhury	Jagannath	
1983	Hero	Ramu (Jaikishen's father)	
1983	Ek Baar Chale Aao	Narayan Das	
1984	Zakhmi Sher	Judge	
1984	Sharaabi	Masterji	
1984	Shravan Kumar		
1984	Farishta		
1985	Phaansi Ke Baad		
1985	Mera Saathi	Gopal	
1985	Rehguzar	Landlord	Direct-to-video film
1986	Mera Dharam	Baba	
1986	Kala Dhanda Goray Log	Maharaj	
1986	Ghar Sansar	Rahim Chacha	
1986	Paise Ke Peechhey	Mahendra Malhotra	
1987	Himmat Aur Mehanat	Customer in hotel	Special appearance
1987	Ramayan	Goswami Tulsidas	TV series
1988	Pyaar Ka Mandir	Satish's father	
1988	Sone Pe Suhaaga	Kashinath	
1988	Maalamaal	Shri Mangatram's manager	
1988	Jai Karoli Maa		
1989	Abhi To Main Jawan Hoon		
1989	Chandni	Doctor	
1989	Ilaaka	Man with suitcase	
1989	Gharana	Radha's father	
1989	Toofan	Priest in the Hanuman temple	
1989	Jaadugar	Gyaneshwar	
1990	Baap Numbri Beta Dus Numbri	John	
1990	Majboor	Judge	
1990	Sheshnaag	Bhola & Champa's father	
1990	Baaghi	Ramnath	
1991	Pyar Ka Devta	Doctor	
1991	Karz Chukana Hai	College principal	
1991	Raiszaada	Judge	
1991	Irada		
1991	Prem Qaidi	Suryanath	
1991	Swarg Yahan Narak Yahan	School principal	
1991	Sau Crore	Kamlesh's father	Cameo
1992	Humshakal	Judge	Posthumous release
1993	Aakhri Chetawani		Posthumous release

== Accolades ==
Year	Award	Category	Film	Result
1955	Filmfare Awards	Best Actor	Shri Chaitanya Mahaprabhu	Won
1956	Filmfare Awards	Best Actor	Mirza Ghalib	Nominated

== Sources ==
- Gulzar; Govind Nihalani; Saibal Chatterjee (2003). Encyclopaedia of Hindi cinema. Popular Prakashan. p. 533. ISBN 8179910660.
