= Dil-E-Nadaan (1953 film) =

1953 Indian film by Abdur Rashid Kardar

- Directed by: A. R. Kardar
- Written by: Kardar Productions story department
- Produced by: A. R. Kardar
- Starring: Talat Mehmood; Shyama; Peace Kanwal
- Cinematography: Dwarka Divecha
- Edited by: M. S. Hajee
- Music by: Ghulam Mohammed
- Production company: Kardar Productions Ltd.
- Release date: 1953
- Running time: 142 minutes
- Country: India
- Language: Hindi

Dil-E-Nadaan (Naive Heart) is a 1953 Hindi romantic drama film produced and directed by A. R. Kardar.

Produced under the banner of Kardar Productions Ltd., the story and dialogue were handled by the story department of Kardar Production Ltd unit. The cinematography was by Dwarka Divecha. The music director was Ghulam Mohammed, with lyrics written by Shakeel Badayuni.

It was Talat Mehmood's debut acting role, and he was introduced as the "Singing Star Talat Mehmood". He co-starred with the new actress Peace Kanwal, who was introduced in this film and with Shyama. The film failed at the box-office in spite of several popular songs. The other actors were Diwan Sharar, S. N. Bannerji, Ramesh and Master Romi.

The story was a love triangle, with two sisters played by Shyama and Peace Kanwal, in love with the same man (Talat Mahmood).

== Plot ==
Kamini (Peace Kanwal) and Asha (Shyama) are two sisters living with their wealthy father, Seth Heerachand. Mohan (Talat Mahmood), is striving to become a musician, but is hindered by his father who is a petition writer. Mohan leaves home and meets up with Kamini and her father. Seth Heerachand helps Mohan to make a name for himself as a music director. Kamini and Mohan fall in love, but Asha lets Kamini know that she loves Mohan. Having spoilt Asha, as an older sister Kamini gets Asha and Mohan married. However things don't work out between the two. Asha is disturbed by Mohan's music and finds it boring. She finds out about Kamini and Mohan's affair and consumed with rage a pregnant Asha runs after Mohan but trips down the stairs. Badly injured, she gives birth and dies handing the baby to Kamini. After a few years, Kamini and Mohan are brought together by Mohan's son, who insists on calling Kamini, mother.

== Cast ==
- Talat Mahmood as Mohan
- Shyama as Asha
- Peace Kanwal as Kamini

== Soundtrack ==
Ghulam Mohammed composed the music for this film and gave a "standout score" for the film. Bharatan states that Dil-E-Nadan marked a downward trend for him as far as the box-office success was concerned.

Ghulam Mohammed's compositions were well appreciated by the public. One of the notable songs from the film was Talat Mehmood's expressive "Zindagi Dene Wale Sun", the start of which employs western stringed instruments before the tune blends into Raga Bhoop. The second song was Talat Mahmood's "Mohabbat Ki Dhun Beqararon Se Poochho" with co-singers Sudha Malhotra, Jagjit Kaur. The other popular numbers were Jagjit Kaur's "Khamosh Zindagi Ko Ek Afsana Mil Gaya" and Talat's "Jo Khushi Se Chot Khaye".

The lyrics were penned by Shakeel Badayuni and the singers were Talat Mahmood, Asha Bhosle, Shamshad Begum, Sudha Malhotra.

=== Song list ===
Song	Singer
"Zindagi Denewale Sunn, Teri Dunya Se Dil Bhar Gaya"	Talat Mahmood
"Jo Khushi Se Chot Khaye, Woh Dil Kahan Se Laaun"	Talat Mahmood
"Yeh Raat Suhani Raat Nahin"	Talat Mahmood
"Mohabbat Ki Dhun Bekararon Se Poochho, Naghma Hai Kya Chand Taron Se Poochho"	Talat Mahmood, Sudha Malhotra, Jagjit Kaur
"Chanda Gaye Raagini"	Jagjit Kaur
"Khamosh Zindagi Ko"	Jagjit Kaur
"Na Woh Hamare Na Dil Hamara"	Sudha Malhotra
"Ae Dil Na Sata Mujhko"	Shamshad Begum
"Lijo Babul Hamara Salaam Re"	Asha Bhosle
