= Daana Paani =

Daana Paani may refer to:

- Daana Paani (1953 film), Indian Hindi language film, directed by V. M. Vyas
- Daana Paani (1989 film), Indian Hindi language film, directed by Deven Verma
- Daana Paani (2018 film), Indian Punjabi language film, directed by Tarnvir Singh Jagpal
