= Gateway of India (film) =

Gateway Of India
- Theatrical release poster
- Directed by: Om Prakash
- Written by: Jagdish Kanwal
- Screenplay by: Jagdish Kanwal
- Produced by: Om Prakash
- Starring: Madhubala; Bharat Bhushan; Pradeep Kumar; Anita Guha; Johnny Walker
- Cinematography: G. Singh
- Edited by: Dharamveer
- Music by: Madan Mohan
- Color process: Black and white
- Release date: 19 July 1957
- Country: India
- Language: Hindi

Gateway of India is a 1957 Indian Hindi-language black comedy film directed and produced by Om Prakash and cinematographed by G. Singh. The film is edited by Dharamvir and music is composed by Madan Mohan. It features an ensemble cast including Madhubala, Bharat Bhushan, Pradeep Kumar, Anita Guha, Johnny Walker, Master Bhagwan.

Among the earliest films whose story extends over just a few hours, Gateway of India tells the story of an heiress who runs away from her house to escape her murderous uncle. It was a commercial success upon being released in theatres.

In 2015, the film was mentioned by critic Deepa Gahlot in her book 50 Films that Deserve a New Audience.

== Plot ==
Anju (Madhubala) overhears her uncle Shyamlal, plotting to kill her, in order to inherit her father's property. Before he does so, he must find the all-important documents, which she and her loyal servant have hidden.

The uncle kills the poor servant, and tells his minions to put the corpse in a box and deliver it the next morning to the Gateway of India.

He intends to imprison Anju too till she hands over the papers and then kill her, but she escapes. Her uncle sends two goons after her and she has to stay a few steps ahead of them. The adventure takes place over one night, as Anju flees from one tight spot after another, outwitting dangerous thugs and men, who are, to put it mildly, not gentlemen. And before she runs out again, she tells them all to meet her at the Gateway of India the next morning.

The suave bloke Kishore (Pradeep Kumar), who gives a ride in his car is a drug dealer and pimp. The next guy, Chandan (Chandrashekhar), whose car she slips into, takes her to a brothel run by his sister (Manorama). She gets out of there, and runs right into the home of a bootlegger (Johnny Walker) and his brother Tony. She pretends to get drunk, does a song, dance number and skips out again, tripping the guards.

This time she climbs over the gate into the window of a Bluebeard type (Bhagwan Dada), who has married half a dozen women and then killed them to collect insurance.

Now he wants to marry for good, settle down and have kids. Anju bats her eyelids at him too, promises to marry him (he gets to dance to a dream sequence dressed as a Chinaman), tells him to meet her at the Gateway of India and walks off only to run into a street don (Om Prakash) who takes a fancy to her. With him she switches to Bambaiya jargon and smooth talks him into a Gateway rendezvous.

The two goons are still snapping at her heels, when she encounters a poet Prakash (Bharat Bhushan). She goes to the Gateway of India where the rogue's gallery has congregated, taking the precaution of calling the police. Her uncle tells the cops that she is mad, but the box with the corpse arrives to prove she was telling the truth, and Prakash comes by to help. The criminals all end up in jail and in a move very bold for the time, she runs after Prakash and proposes him, giving him no chance to turn her down.

== Cast ==
- Madhubala as Anju / Padma / Darling / Lajwanti / Chanchal / Lata
- Bharat Bhushan as Prakash
- Pradeep Kumar as Kishore
- Anita Guha as Kishore's girlfriend
- Johnny Walker as Johny
- Om Prakash as Street Don
- Manorama as brothel owner
- Chandrashekhar as Chandan
- Bhagwan Dada
- Shyamlal as Anju's uncle
- Ratan Gaurang as the chef in restaurant
- Aziz Kashmiri
- Sunder (guest appearance)
- Randhir (guest appearance)
- Raj Mehra (guest appearance)

== Production ==
Omprakash had written the story of Gateway of India keeping only one name in his mind: Madhubala. After finishing the story he approached Ataullah Khan, Madhubala's dominating father who used to handle her contracts. Since the film needed night shootings, Khan, who never allowed Madhubala to shoot in nights, refused and asked Omprakash to approach any other actress. However, Omprakash was adamant and ultimately Khan had to give in. Upon listening the story, Khan was so much impressed that he decided to charge lesser than Madhubala's usual high market price.

A large part of Gateway of India was shot in the streets of Bombay. Omprakash had booked a suite at the Taj Hotel for Madhubala to relax between midnight shoots. Since he was a respectable name in the industry, several top actors like Bharat Bhushan and Pradeep Kumar agreed to appear in few minutes' roles.

== Soundtrack ==
The soundtrack of the film, specially the song "Do Ghadi Voh Jo" became popular. The music was by Madan Mohan and lyrics by Rajendra Krishan.

1. "Hum Abhi Aata Tum Abhi Jata" - Mohammed Rafi

2. "Jalwa Jo Tera Dekha" - Asha Bhonsle, Shamshad Begum, Usha Mangeshkar and Meena Mangeshkar

3. "Dekhta Chala Gaya" - Johnny Walker, Lata Mangeshkar and Mohammed Rafi

4. "Na Hanso Hampe" - Lata Mangeshkar

5. "Chal Mere Dil Ke Udan Khatole" - Mohammed Rafi

6. "Ye Raat Badi Mushkil Hai" - Geeta Dutt

7. "Sapne Mein Sajan Se" - Lata Mangeshkar

8. "Do Ghadi Voh Jo" - Lata Mangeshkar and Mohammed Rafi

== Release ==
Gateway of India premiered at Regal Cinema, Bombay, on 19 July 1957.

=== Publicity ===
On 7 July 1957, The Bombay Chronicle featured Madhubala's image from the film on its front page, commenting: "Our Sunday Star this week is a foregone conclusion: One of the prettiest faces of the Indian screen, charming Madhubala, who scores another hit in Gateway of India."

== Reception ==
=== Critical reception ===
A review by The Times of India, dated 21 July 1957, carried the headline: "Gateway Of India Is A Gripping Thriller With Good Music And Gay Comedy".

Critic Deepa Gahlot in a retrospective review found the film's story and themes to be offbeat, as most of the leading actresses in those days were "damsels in distress", while Madhubala played a runner who "survives on her own, without the help of a man." She praised Madhubala highly for her performance: "The chameleon-like character Madhubala played in Gateway of India was one of her best performances and she was a fine comedienne."

=== Box office ===
The film was a commercial success.

In a 1958 survey of the emerging crime-film trend in Hindi cinema, The Illustrated Weekly of India identified Gateway of India as one of five successful crime films released in 1957, alongside Begunah, Mr. X, Dushman and Nau Do Gyarah.
