= Angulimaal (film) =

1960 film

- Directed by: Vijay Bhatt
- Written by: Angulimala Sutta (adaptation); Bhavani Prasad Mishra (dialogue)
- Starring: Bharat Bhushan; Nimmi; Anita Guha; Ulhas
- Cinematography: V. Avdhoot
- Edited by: Pratap Dave
- Music by: Anil Biswas; Bharat Vyas (lyrics)
- Production company: Thai Information Service
- Release date: 1960
- Running time: 153 minutes
- Country: India
- Language: Hindi

Angulimaal ("Finger Garland") is a 1960 Hindi mythology drama film directed by Vijay Bhatt. The film was a Thai Information Service Co. Ltd. Presentation.

Bhatt directed films for other producers besides his Prakash Pictures banner like, Banphool (1972), Hira Aur Pathar (1964) and the "Thai government's Buddhist period film" Angulimaal. The story was adapted from Angulimala Sutta, with dialogues written by Bhavani Prasad Mishra. Special effects were by Babubhai Mistry, a long-time Bhatt regular. The music director was Anil Biswas with lyrics written by Bharat Vyas. The cinematographer was V. Avdhoot and the film starred Nimmi, Bharat Bhushan, Anita Guha, Chandrashekhar, Achala Sachdev, Manmohan Krishna, Prem Adib and Ram Mohan. Vinod Mehra, who started his career as a child actor in Ragini (1958), played the role of the young Bharat Bhushan. He was credited as Vinod Kumar in the film.

The film is set in the time of Buddha and portrays the life of the dacoit Angulimaal. Named Ahinsak at birth, he is the son of the Raj Purohit (Royal Priest), who turns from a scholar to murderous ways, cutting off his victims fingers and making a garland of it, hence called Angulimaal (Finger Garland). He then renounces his killings following an encounter with Buddha and turns into a monk.

== Plot ==
A boy is born to the Raj Purohit (the palace priest) on a stormy, omen-filled night. He has his birth chart read, which indicates that though the child will be well educated, he will be a killer of thousands of people and bring destruction wherever he goes. The child is taken to be blessed by the King and on asking about his Kundali (horoscope), the Raj Jyotishi (Royal Astrologer) who has made it, informs the king of the disaster that the child will wreak. The people in the court want the child killed, but the king stops them by saying that you cannot punish someone before the crime has been committed. However, on being reportedly warned by the Jyotish about the correctness of his reading of the child's Janam Kundli (birth chart), the Raj Guru decides to take the child to his Gurukul for the first twelve years of his life and hone him to be the best student; the Acharya (Brahmin teacher/Guru) will take over to teach him for a further eight years to turn him into the brightest. The King christens the boy Ahinsak (Non-violent), meaning someone who is peace-loving. After finishing his eight years in basic training, Ahinsak leaves with the Acharya for the Gurukul where the Acharya's much younger wife Guru Mata (Anita Guha) also helps in imparting education, archery, athletics and horse riding. Ahinsak excels in all the arts. Also studying at the Gurukul is Maruti (Chandrashekhar), the Prime Minister's son, who is to marry the king's daughter, and his two friends, Dhanpal (Ram Mohan) and Krishan (Kesari). As Ahinsak is adept in all fields, the three friends are jealous of him and of the attention Ahinsak gets at the Gurukul from the Acharya and Guru Mata.

Several years pass and the Acharya is informed that the princess Maya Devi (Nimmi) will be hunting in the nearby forest. Maruti and his friends fear that Maya's attention will be diverted from Maruti to Ahinsak. While hunting, the princess comes across Ahinsak, whom she has liked since childhood when they had met at her eighth birthday. They go to the princess' camp where they meet Maruti, Dhanpal and Krishen who have come from the Gurukul. Maruti asks the princess to stay away from Ahinsak as they are to marry, but the princess refuses. When Ahinsak comes visiting, Maruti lets loose a caged tiger. Seeing the chaos, Ahinsak confronts the tiger and fights it bare-handed initially, and then finally kills it with a spear. Maya makes Ahinsak stay in the camp overnight, while Maruti and his friends return to the Gurukul and lie to the Acharya about Ahinsak's reason for staying there. The Acharya is angry with Ahinsak for having broken one of the rules of the Gurukul by spending the night out and refuses to listen to his explanation. Maruti further instigates the Acharya by telling him that his wife, Guru Mata, has shown extra interest in Ahinsak and everyone in the Gurukul is talking about it. After involving him in a further fight, the three friends are happy to see that the Acharya has believed them and is now taunting Ahinsak about the predictions in his birth chart. It is time for everyone to leave the Gurukul and to attend the function where the students pay obeisance to their Guru. Ahinsak falls ill and Gurumata tells him to stay till the fever abates. The Acharya sees this and once again misunderstands. He vents out his anger on Ahinsak and asks him to leave the Gurukul taunting him yet again and telling him to go kill the thousands as written in his destiny. Dhanpal further provokes him by linking him to Gurumata. In a fit of anger Ahinsak kills Dhanpal. He runs away from there. Acharya now believes that the prediction has come true.

Maruti informs the king about the murder and that Ahinsak had an affair with Guru Mata. The King sends soldiers out to catch him. His father disowns him. The Guru Mata tries to drown herself but is saved by one of the disciples of Buddha. Ahinsak has taken to killing people, his wish being to kill every human being. He cuts off their fingers, making a garland of them and wears it around his neck. He is now called Angulimaal (finger garland). The story then follows the murderous Angulimaal who eventually comes across Buddha and tries to kill him. The contact with Buddha changes his life forever. He renounces his evil ways and becomes a monk.

== Cast ==
- Nimmi as Princess Maya Devi
- Bharat Bhushan as Ahinsak/Angulimaal
  - Vinod Mehra as Young Ahinsak
- Anita Guha as Guru Mata
- Chandrashekhar as Maruti
- Achala Sachdev as Ahinsak's mother
- Manmohan Krishna as Ahinsak's father/Raj Purohit
- Prem Adib as Maharaja
- Ram Mohan as Dhanpal
- Kesari as Krishna
- Helen as tribal dancer
- Ulhas as Acharya
- Bimla
- Sheila Kashmiri

== Crew ==
The film crew consisted of:

- Production: Thai Information Service Co. Ltd.
- Director: Vijay Bhatt
- Story adaption: Angulimaal Sutta
- Dialogues: Bhavani Prasad Mishra
- Choreography: Chiman Sheth
- Make-up: M. N. Borkar
- Costumes: Gaffar and Krishna
- Song Recording: Minoo Katrak, Kaushik, Ishan Ghosh
- Special Effects: Babubhai Mistry
- Director of Photography: V. Avdhoot
- Editing: Pratap Dave
- Art Direction: Kanu Desai
- Lyrics: Bharat Vyas
- Music: Anil Biswas

== Reception ==
The film got a favourable review in the 24 February 1961 issue of Filmfare magazine. Bharat Bhushan was praised for his "deep understanding and sincerity" in assaying the three dimensions of his role, a scholar, killer and monk. Nimmi, Anita Guha and Ulhas were considered "compelling" in their performances. The song "Buddham, Sharanam, Gachhami" was cited as "inspiring". According to the reviewer the dialogue, art direction and photography helped to make Angulimaal a "memorable film"

== Soundtrack ==
The music was composed by Anil Biswas with lyrics written by Bharat Vyas. The playback singing was provided by Lata Mangeshkar, Manna Dey, Asha Bhosle, Meena Kapoor, Aarti Mukherji. The song "Aayi Aayi Basanti Mela" starts off with Raga Basant, followed by a dance number in Rag Khamaj, and then returns to Raga Basant for the holi song sequence.

=== Song list ===
#	Title	Singer
1	"Buddham Sharanam Gachchami"	Manna Dey
2	"Aayi Aayi Basanti Bela"	Lata Mangeshkar, Manna Dey, Meena Kapoor
3	"O Murli Waale Gopal"	Asha Bhosle
4	"Bade Aaye Shikari Shikar Karne/In Bhole Bhale Hirnon Pe Vaar Karne"	Manna Dey, Asha Bhosle
5	"Dheere Dheere Dhal Re Chanda"	Aarti Mukherji
6	"Tere Man Mein Kaun, Ja Re Na Bataun Main Toh Naam Chitchor Ka"	Lata Mangeshkar, Meena Kapoor
7	"Mere Chanchal Naina Madhu Ras"	Meena Kapoor
8	"Jab Dukh Ki Ghadiyan Aaye"	Manna Dey, Asha Bhosle
