= Roos Gailen Saiyen Hamaar =

- Directed by: Nazir Hussain
- Written by: Mumtaz Hussain
- Story by: Mumtaz Hussain
- Produced by: Mumtaz Hussain
- Starring: Rakesh Pandey Padma Khanna
- Cinematography: R.K. Mitra
- Edited by: D.W. Dandekar
- Production company: Kamsaar Films
- Release date: 1980
- Running time: 141 minutes
- Country: India
- Language: Bhojpuri

Roos Gailen Saiyen Hamaar (Bhojpuri for My lover is sulking) is a 1980 Indian Bhojpuri language directed by Nazir Hussain. The film was produced and written by Mumtaz Hussain under the banner of Kamsaar Films. The film stars Rakesh Pandey and Padma Khanna as the lead actors with supporting roles being performed by Nazir Hussain, Vijaya Chowdhury and Leela Mishra.

== Plot ==
The film presents a portrayal of rural life across two generations in an Indian village, focusing on how deeply rooted social structures shape personal and collective destinies. Central to the narrative are tensions arising from caste hierarchies, economic disparities, and entrenched gender roles, which influence relationships, marriages, and power dynamics within the community.

== Cast ==
- Rakesh Pandey
- Padma Khanna
- Nazir Hussain
- Vijaya Chowdhury
- Leela Mishra
- Tun Tun
- Bhagwan Sinha

== Soundtrack ==
The soundtrack of Roos Gailen Saiyen Hamaar was composed by Chitragupt with lyrics written by Anjaan.

No.	Title	Singer(s)
1	Jab Se Lagal Saal Solahwan	Asha Bhosle
2	Kahan Jaiba Babua Najariya Ladake	Asha Bhosle
3	Kahe Rooth Gaili Saiyan Hamaar	Asha Bhosle
4	Manwa Ka Pinjra Mein	Asha Bhosle, Mohammed Rafi
5	Mayee Ke Mamta Ketna Nirmal	Mohammed Rafi
