= Sangeet Samrat Tansen =

- Directed by: S. N. Tripathi
- Produced by: Sur Singar Chitra
- Starring: Bharat Bhushan; Anita Guha; David; Sapru; Mukri
- Music by: S. N. Tripathi
- Production company: Sur Singar Chitra
- Release date: 1962
- Running time: 170 min
- Country: India
- Language: Hindi

Sangeet Samrat Tansen (King of Music- Tansen) is a 1962 Hindi biopic historical drama film directed by S. N. Tripathi. Produced by Sur Singar Chitra it had lyrics by Shailendra and Swami Haridas with music by S. N. Tripathi. One of the popular songs from this film was "Jhoomti Chali Hawaa" in Raga Sohni, sung by Mukesh for Bharat Bhushan. The film starred Bharat Bhushan, Anita Guha, Sabita Chatterjee, David, Sapru and Mukri.

The story is a biopic of the famous court singer musician, Mian Tansen, one of the Navaratnas in Emperor Akbar’s court.

== Plot ==
Tansen, called Ramtanu or Tanu is born dumb, but a miracle in the temple at the age five gives the boy the ability to speak and sing. His voice attracts the sage musician Swami Haridas of Brindaban. He trains the boy in the Dhrupad style. Swami Haridas gets Tanu to study under Muhammad Ghaus, where he lives with his childhood mate Hansa. Several years pass and Ghaus asks Tanu to shift to the court of Raja Ramchandra. This disappoints Tanu as he has plans to marry Hansa. However, he ventures forth to the palace where his voice is applauded and he is awarded the title of Sangeet Shiromani Tansen. His singing reputation reaches Emperor Akbar, who invites him to join his court singers. There, he becomes one of the nine jewels of the Emperor's exceptionally talented men. The story then follows misunderstandings with his beloved Hansa, his singing prowess and finally his getting united once again with Hansa.

== Cast ==
- Bharat Bhushan as Sangeet Shiromani / Sangeet Samrat Tansen 'Tanu'
- Anita Guha as Hansa
- Mukri as Ustad Fateh Khan
- David Abraham as Mohammed Khauj
- D. K. Sapru as Raja Ramchandra
- Sabita Chatterjee as Naaz Praveen
- Kumar
- Prem Sagar
- Parshuram
- Radheshyam
- S. N. Tripathi as Akbar (uncredited)

== Tansen In Films ==
Two films were made depicting the life of Tansen. The first was the K. L. Saigal starrer Tansen (1943) with Khursheed Bano which had popular songs and was a success at the box-office. The second was Sangeet Samrat Tansen. Tansen, played by Surendra, was also shown in Baiju Bawra (1952), where he competes with Baiju in a music competition only to lose to him.

== Soundtrack ==
S. N. Tripathi, along with directing the film also gave the music direction, and enacted the part of Emperor Akbar.. The lyrics were by Shailendra and Swami Haridas, who is the author of "Sapta Suran Teen Gram" sung in Raga Yaman Kalyan (or Adbhut Kalyan). Some of the Raga-based songs: The song "Raag Bhairav Pratham Shant Ras" shows the completion of Tansen's training by Haridas by his singing the raagmala, "Deepak Jalao Jyoti Jagao" in Raaga Dipak and "traditionally associated with fire", "Badli Badli Duniya Hai Meri" in Raag Jhinjhoti sung by Lata Mangeshkar and Mahendra Kapoor, and "Jhoomti Chali Hawaa" in Raaga Sohni sung by Mukesh.

=== Songlist ===
#	Title	Singer	Raga	Lyricist
1	"Sapta Suran Teen Gram"	Manna Dey	Yaman (raga)	Swami Haridas
2	"Raag Bhairav Pratham Shant Ras Jake"	Manna Dey		Swami Haridas
3	"Badli Badli Duniya Hai Meri" (Duet)	Lata Mangeshkar, Mahendra Kapoor	Jhinjhoti	Shailendra
4	"Sakhi Kaise Dharoon Main Dhir"	Lata Mangeshkar	Shivaranjani	Shailendra
5	"Kantadha Kantadha"	Manna Dey		Shailendra
6	"Jhoomti Chali Hawa"	Mukesh	Sohni	Shailendra
7	"Mitwa Laut Aaye Meri"	Manna Dey	Darbari Kanada	Shailendra
8	"Sudh Bisar Gayi Aaj"	Manna Dey, Mohammed Rafi	Hemant	Shailendra
9	"Deepak Jalao Jyoti Jagao"	Mohammed Rafi		Shailendra
10	"Meha aao re Ghir Ghir Ke Chaon re"	Lata Mangeshkar, Manna Dey, Asha Bhonsle		Shailendra
11	"Hey Natraj Gangadhar Shambu"	Kamal Barot, Mahendra Kapoor	Jogiya	Shailendra
12	"Log Jaage Pavan Jaage"			Shailendra
13	"Kuhoo Kuhoo Pi Kahan"			Shailendra
14	"Yeh Jahaan Hai Teri Kudrat"			Shailendra
15	"Toot Gayi Mere Man Ki Bina Toot Gayi"	Poorna Seth, Pandharinath Kolhapure		Shailendra
16	"Badli Duniya Hai Meri" (Female)	Lata Mangeshkar		Shailendra
17	"Tu hai ke nahin hai"	Manna Dey and Mohd. Rafi		Shailendra
