= Pradeep Kumar (actor) =

Indian film actor (1925–2001)

- Born: Sital Batabyal; 4 January 1925; Calcutta, Bengal Presidency, India
- Died: 27 October 2001 (aged 76); Kolkata, West Bengal, India
- Years active: 1947–1998
- Known for: Anarkali; Nagin; Taj Mahal
- Children: 4 including Beena Banerjee (daughter)

Pradeep Kumar (born Sital Batabyal; 4 January 1925 – 27 October 2001) was an Indian actor who is recognized for his work in Hindi and Bengali language films. With a career spanning across five decades, Kumar is widely considered one of the greatest, most graceful and regal actors in the history of Indian Cinema.

== Career ==
When Kumar was 17 years old, he decided to take up acting. He started his film career in Bengali films. His notable roles in Bengali films were in Alaknanda (1947), directed by renowned filmmaker Debaki Bose, and in 42 (1951).

Kumar then shifted to Bombay and Filmistan studios, and had an important role in the film Anand Math (1952). He played the lead role with Bina Rai in Anarkali (1953) and with Vyjayanthimala in Nagin (1954). Both films were very popular and had songs that added to the movies' success. He worked with Madhubala in eight films, of which Raj Hath (1956), Shirin Farhad (1956), Gateway of India (1957), Yahudi Ki Ladki (1957) and Passport (1961) were massive hits. He had a spate of releases in the second half of the 1950s. He did not enjoy as much success in the 1960s, though Ghunghat (1960), Aarti (1962) & Taj Mahal (1963) were successful. He worked with Meena Kumari in seven films; Adil-E-Jahangir (1955) , Bandhan (1956), Aarti (1962), Chitralekha (1964), Bheegi Raat (1965), Bahu Begum (1967), Noor Jehan (1967) and Saat Phere (1970); with Mala Sinha in eight films; Badshah (1954), Naya Zamana (1957), Detective (1958), Ek Shola (1958), Fashion (1959), Duniya Na Mane (1959), and Mitti Mein Sona (1960).

He also worked with the legendary Bengali actor and matinee idol Uttam Kumar in Grihadaha in 1967 which was produced by Uttam himself and then he worked in Plot No 5.

He did not get to act with the newer heroines of the 1960s such as Sadhana, Saira Banu, Babita or Sharmila Tagore, though he did work with Asha Parekh in Ghoonghat and Meri Surat Teri Aankhen and with Waheeda Rehman in Rakhi (1962). In 1969, he moved to character roles with Sambandh and Mehboob Ki Mehndi. Some of his later films include Jaanwar in 1982 and Razia Sultan in 1983.

== Awards ==
He won the Kalakar Award - Lifetime Achievement Award (1999).

== Personal life and death ==
Pradeep Kumar had three daughters, Beena Banerjee, Meena Chatterjee, Reena Mukherjee and a son Deviprasad Kumar Batabyal. His brother Kalidas (Batabyal) was a director who directed Kumar in several movies. Kumar died in Calcutta on 27 October 2001, at the age of 76. His daughter Beena Banerjee plays character roles in movies and TV serials including Uttaran; her son Siddharth Banerjee worked as assistant director in Sajid Khan's Housefull 2 (2012) and Himmatwala (2013).

== Filmography ==
=== Hindi ===
| Year | Film | Role | Notes |
|---|---|---|---|
| 1952 | Anand Math | Jeevanand | First Hindi film |
| 1953 | Anarkali | Shehzada Salim | |
| 1954 | Badshah | | |
| 1954 | Malka–E–Alam Noorjehan | | |
| 1954 | Nagin | Sanatan | |
| 1954 | Subah Ka Tara | Mohan | |
| 1955 | Adl–E –Jehangir | Shiraz | |
| 1955 | Albeli | Pradeep | |
| 1955 | Hoor–E–Arab | | |
| 1955 | Sitara | | |
| 1956 | Anjaan – Somewhere in Delhi | Manohar Nath | |
| 1956 | Arab Ka Saudagar | | |
| 1956 | Bandhan | Amarnath | |
| 1956 | Dhola Maru | | |
| 1956 | Durgesh Nandini | Kumar Jagat Singh | |
| 1956 | Heer | Ranjha | |
| 1956 | Jagte Raho | Pradeep | Guest Appearance |
| 1956 | Jayshri | | |
| 1956 | Patrani | King Karma Dev | |
| 1956 | Raj Hath | Kumar | |
| 1956 | Shirin Farhad | Farhad | |
| 1956 | Taj | Puran | |
| 1957 | Ek Jhalak | | Also Producer |
| 1957 | Fashion | | |
| 1957 | Gateway of India | Kishore | |
| 1957 | Hill Station | | |
| 1957 | Miss India | Anil | |
| 1957 | Naya Zamana | Kishore | Guest Appearance |
| 1957 | Yahudi Ki Ladki | | |
| 1958 | Adalat | Rajendra Singh "Rajan" | |
| 1958 | Detective | Raja Ghosh | |
| 1958 | Ek Shola | | Also Presenter and Co-producer |
| 1958 | Police | Rangooni and Kiran Kumar (fake Rangooni) (Dual role) | Also Co-producer |
| 1958 | Taxi 555 | | |
| 1958 | Zindagi Ya Toofan | Akhtar | |
| 1959 | Duniya Na Mane | Raja | |
| 1959 | Jawani Ki Hawa | Chand | |
| 1959 | Naya Sansar | | |
| 1959 | Pyar Ki Rahen | | |
| 1960 | Ghunghat | Ravi | |
| 1960 | Mehlon Ke Khwab | Chander | |
| 1960 | Mitti Mein Sona | | Also Producer |
| 1960 | Tu Nahin Aur Sahi | Rattan | |
| 1961 | Apsara | | |
| 1961 | Batwara | Kundan | |
| 1961 | Modern Girl | Prem | |
| 1961 | Passport | Shekhar | |
| 1961 | Sanjog | Shyamu | |
| 1962 | Aarti | Deepak | |
| 1962 | Half Ticket | | Cameo |
| 1962 | Rakhi | Anand | |
| 1963 | Jab Se Tumhen Dekha Hai | Mohan | |
| 1963 | Mere Armaan Mere Sapne | Kumar | |
| 1963 | Meri Surat Teri Aankhen | Sudhir | |
| 1963 | Mulzim | Rajesh "Lalu" | |
| 1963 | Taj Mahal | Emperor Shah Jahan | |
| 1963 | Ustadon Ke Ustad | Dinesh | |
| 1964 | Baghi | Habib | |
| 1964 | Chitralekha | Aryaputra Samant Bijgupt | |
| 1965 | Bheegi Raat | Ajay | |
| 1965 | Mahabharat | Arjuna | |
| 1965 | Saheli | Kailash and his conscience | |
| 1965 | Sindbad Alibaba & Aladin | Sindbad | |
| 1965 | Zindagi Aur Maut | Ashok | |
| 1966 | Afsana | Shekhar | |
| 1966 | Do Dilon Ki Dastaan | | Also Producer and Co-Director |
| 1967 | Bahu Begum | Yousuf | |
| 1967 | Noor Jehan | Prince Salim | |
| 1967 | Raat Aur Din | Pratap | |
| 1967 | Wahan Ke Log | Rakesh alias Prince Ranveer Singh | |
| 1969 | Sambandh | Umakant Chatterjee | |
| 1970 | Harishchandra Taramati | | |
| 1970 | Saat Phere | | |
| 1971 | Mehboob Ki Mehndi | Nawab Anwar Kamal alias Khairuddin "Khairu" | |
| 1972 | Dur Naheen Manzil | Ashok | |
| 1972 | Mangetar | Prakash | |
| 1972 | Samjhauta | Bhola | |
| 1973 | Jalte Badan | Thakur | |
| 1974 | Hawas | Shailendra Singh | |
| 1974 | Shatranj Ke Mohre | Manmohan | |
| 1975 | Chaitali | Avinash | |
| 1975 | Kaagaz Ki Nao | Kumar | |
| 1975 | Pratigya | Habibullah | |
| 1976 | Do Anjaane | Sumesh Dutt | |
| 1976 | Parmatma | Guruji Maharaj "Swami" | |
| 1976 | Shankar Shambhu | Lakhan Singh | |
| 1977 | Dharam Veer | Maharaja Pratap Singh | |
| 1977 | Hatyara | Bhairav Singh | |
| 1977 | Kalabaaz | G. D. Sapru | |
| 1977 | Safed Jhooth | R. S. Prakash | Guest Appearance |
| 1977 | Shankar Husain | Sardar | Guest Appearance |
| 1978 | Amar Shakti | Maharaj Shamsher Singh | |
| 1978 | Chakravyuha | Thakur | |
| 1978 | Ghata | Vasudev Mehra | |
| 1978 | Khatta Meetha | Zarine's father | |
| 1978 | Tumhari Kasam | Anand’s father | |
| 1979 | Lok Parlok | Devraj Indra | |
| 1980 | Aakhri Insaaf | Shamsher | |
| 1980 | Chambal Ki Kasam | Raja Thakur | Guest Appearance |
| 1980 | Khoon Kharaba | Nawab | |
| 1980 | Main Aur Meri Tanhai | | |
| 1980 | Nishana | Surya Prakash | |
| 1981 | Katilon Ke Kaatil | Pratap Singh | |
| 1981 | Kranti | Shamsher Singh | |
| 1981 | Plot No. 5 | A Doctor | |
| 1982 | Chalti Ka Naam Zindagi | Khuda Baksh alias Gopal | |
| 1982 | Honey | | |
| 1982 | Jaanwar | Maharaja Kunwar Singh | |
| 1982 | Teesri Ankh | Inspector General Malhotra | Guest Appearance |
| 1983 | Lal Chunariyaa | Shankarlal | |
| 1983 | Raziya Sultan | Sultan Altamash (Iltutmish) | |
| 1983 | Salam–E–Mohabbat | | |
| 1984 | Duniya | Dinesh Verma | Guest Appearance |
| 1984 | Laila | Peer sahab | |
| 1984 | Purana Mandir | Thakur | |
| 1985 | Amber | Police Commissioner Patel | Hindi dubbed version of Bengali film Jyoti (1988) which got released 3 years later |
| 1985 | Ek Daku Saher Mein | Father | |
| 1985 | Ganga Ke Paar | | |
| 1985 | Maha Shaktimaan | Maharaja Purushottam Singh | |
| 1985 | Oonche Log | Thakur Vikram Singh | |
| 1985 | Salma | Nawab Bakar Ali | |
| 1986 | Angaaray | Police Commissioner | |
| 1986 | Durgaa Maa | D. S. P. (Parvati's father) | |
| 1986 | Mera Dharam | Hari Singh Sengar | |
| 1986 | Sajna Saath Nibhana | | |
| 1987 | Daku Hasina | Shamsher Singh | |
| 1988 | Bhed Bhav | Thakur Shamsher Singh | |
| 1988 | Chintamanee Surdas | Emperor Akbar | Guest Appearance |
| 1988 | Na Bhoole Hain Na Bhoolenge (Parts 1 and 2) | Viren "Guruji" | Television film; Also Producer and Director |
| 1988 | Prem Sandesh | Thakur (Raju's father) | |
| 1988 | Rukhsat | Sapna Sehgal's father | |
| 1988 | Waaris | Kishan Singh | |
| 1989 | Aakhri Baazi | Cobra | Guest Appearance; Hindi dubbed version of Bengali film Mastan (1989) |
| 1989 | Aakhri Muqabla | Deepti's father | Guest Appearance |
| 1989 | Mamta Ki Chhaon Mein | College Principal | |
| 1990 | Aakhri Badla | Preetam Saigal | Hindi dubbed version of Bengali film Swarna Trisha (1989) |
| 1990 | Sher Dil | Ram Kumar Saxena | |
| 1991 | Pyar Ka Sawan | Pandit Rajaram | |
| 1991 | Raiszaada | Barrister Kumar | |
| 1991 | Yeh Aag Kab Bujhegi | Umrao Singh | |
| 1991-1992 | Majhdhaar | | Television series |
| 1992 | Pyaar Ka Saudagar | Virendra Sinha | |
| 1993 | Veerta | Balwant Rai | |
| 1998 | Badmaash | Police Commissioner | Guest Appearance; voice dubbed |
| 1998 | Swami Vivekananda | Vishwanath Dutta | |

=== Bengali ===
| Year | Film | Role | Notes |
|---|---|---|---|
| 1947 | Alakanada | | |
| 1947 | Burmar Pathey | | |
| 1949 | Vishnupriya | Nimai | |
| 1949 | Swami | Naren | |
| 1949 | Debi Chowdhurani | Brajendra | |
| 1950 | Sandhya Belar Rupkatha | | |
| 1951 | Biyallish | Ajay | |
| 1955 | Dassyu Mohan | Mohan | |
| 1956 | Ek Din Ratre | Pradeep | Bengali version of Jagte Raho (1956) |
| 1957 | Tamosha | Dharani Mohan | |
| 1961 | Rai Bahadur | | |
| 1965 | Pratham Prem | | |
| 1967 | Abhishapta Chambal | | |
| 1967 | Badhu Baran | | |
| 1967 | Grihadaha | Suresh | |
| 1982 | Swarna Mahal | Jeetendra Singha Roy | |
| 1982 | Troyee | Vikas | Guest Appearance |
| 1988 | Jyoti | Police Commissioner Patel | Guest Appearance; Dubbed in Hindi as Amber (1985) which got released 3 years before |
| 1989 | Mastan | Cobra | Guest Appearance; dubbed in Hindi as Aakhri Baazi (1989) |
| 1989 | Sansar | Das | Dubbed version of the Odia film Maya Michara Sansar (1987) |
| 1989 | Swarna Trisha | Preetam Saigal | Dubbed in Hindi as Aakhri Badla (1990) |
| 1990 | Mandira | Gurudev | Guest Appearance |
| 1996 | Shesh Pratiksha | Shrikant Majumdar | |

=== Other languages ===
| Year | Film | Language | Role | Notes |
|---|---|---|---|---|
| 1962 | Banto | Punjabi | Dr. Kishan | |
| 1963 | Laakho Vanzaro | Gujarati | | |
| 1987 | Micha Mayara Sansar | Odia | Das | Dubbed in Bengali as Sansar (1989). |
