= Peace Kanwal =

Indian actress

- Born: 16 December in the 1930s Amritsar
- Other name: Rajshree Ruia (first marriage name)
- Occupations: Actress, painter
- Spouse(s): Sushil Ruia (m. 1955; div. 1968) V. Mahesh (m. 1977)
- Children: 1 son

Peace Kanwal (born 16 December, in the 1930s) is an Indian film actress and painter.

== Early life ==
Kanwal was born in Amritsar, the daughter of Indriyaas (Andrew) Munshilal Kanwal. Both parents were from Rajput families; her father was a Christian missionary and a doctor at hospitals in Agra and Amritsar. She was admitted to Ludhiana Medical College.

== Career ==
While in medical school, Kanwal won a national beauty contest in 1953, and followed an acting career instead. She appeared in several films between 1953 and 1991, including Dil-E-Nadaan (1953), Barati (1954), Kismet (1956), Barsat Ki Rat (1960), Aarti (1962), Aasmaan (1982), and Woh Subah Kabhi to Aayegi (1991). She endorsed Kaminia Toiletries, including hair products, soap, and makeup; the product line's name was similar to that of her character, Kamini, in Dil-E-Nadaan.

Kanwal is a painter and has exhibited her art internationally, including a 1974 solo show in New York City. She is active on behalf of the War Widows Organization, Friends of Children, and Lioness Club.

== Personal life ==
Kanwal married Sushil Ruia in 1955. They had a son (born 1957), and legally separated in 1968. Her second husband is V. Mahesh, grandson of politician V. V. Giri; they married in 1977. The couple live in Mumbai, as of 2020.

== Filmography ==
Year	Film	Role	Notes
1953	Dil-E-Nadaan	Kamini	Debut film & role
1954	Barati	Pilu	
1956	Kismet		
1960	Barsat Ki Rat	Shanti	
1960	Nai Maa		
1962	Aarti	Ramola	
1980	Chambal Ki Kassam		
1984	Aasmaan		
1991	Woh Subha Kabhi Toh Ayegi		Last film & role
