= Barsat Ki Rat (1960 film) =

1960 film directed by P. L. Santoshi

- Theatrical release poster
- Directed by: P. L. Santoshi
- Screenplay by: P. L. Santoshi; Bharat Bhushan; Sarshar Sailani (dialogues)
- Story by: Rafi Ajmeri
- Produced by: R. Chandra
- Starring: Madhubala; Bharat Bhushan; Shyama
- Cinematography: M. Rajaram
- Edited by: P. S. Kochikar
- Music by: Roshan (soundtrack score); Sonik (background score)
- Production company: Sri Vishwabharati Films
- Release date: 9 December 1960
- Running time: 142 min.
- Country: India
- Languages: Hindi; Urdu
- Box office: est. ₹35 million

Bāŕsāt Ki Rāt (transl. A Rainy Night) is a 1960 Indian Hindi-language romantic musical film directed by P. L. Santoshi and produced by R. Chandra. Starring Madhubala, Bharat Bhushan and Shyama, the film is considered a defining example of the romantic musical film genre.

The film's art direction is by Ganesh Basak. A Muslim-social set amongst the erudite and cultured urban Muslims of independent India, Barsat Ki Rat revolves around two lovers Shabnam (Madhubala) and Amaan (Bhushan), who strive to be together but the society does not approve of them. Upon its release, the film became a blockbuster success, the second highest earner of 1960, the twenty-first highest earner of the 1960s at the Indian box office, and one of the top hundred highest-grossers of all time (when adjusted for inflation).

Barsat Ki Rat got a positive feedback from contemporary critics. The Roshan-composed soundtrack, considered one of the finest in the Indian cinema, was singled out for praise by both critics and audience. The song "Zindagi Bhar Nahi Bhoolegi" and the qawwali "Na To Karavan Ki Talash Hai" topped the music charts that year. A cult film now, Barsat Ki Rat has been lauded by 21st century critics, who have particularly noted Madhubala's performance and the soundtrack. The latter continues to be widely popular and imitated.

== Plot ==
Amaan Hyderabadi is a talented and struggling Urdu poet and lyricist trying to make a mark in the world of music. Shabnam, who has not seen him yet, loves his songs and poetry. For his job, he travels to his friend Inspector Shekhar's house to perform his own songs live on All India Radio. One rainy night, he seeks shelter and also meets Shabnam – whom he can't get out of his mind. Through Shekhar, he meets the family of police commissioner Khan Bahadur and encounters the eldest daughter, none other than Shabnam. Luck comes his way as he is appointed as a tutor for Shabnam's little sister Razia.

During lessons, Aman and Shabnam grow closer. Khan Bahadur overhears their conversations, not being much impressed due to Amaan's poverty. He insults and expels Amaan from their house and forbids any contact. Shabnam sees elopement with Amaan as her only hope. Their escape plan is discovered and her father swiftly fixes a devastated Shabnam's marriage with Aftab Ahmed of Lucknow against her wish. Khan Bahadur sets off for Lucknow with his family. Amaan also arrives in Lucknow in search of his fortune. Coincidentally, Amaan discovers that Aftab, the friend in whose house he is staying, is actually the future husband of his lady love Shabnam.

Amaan leaves Aftab's house without informing him. Meanwhile, Amaan's old friends Shabab and Shama arrive in Lucknow to participate in a qawwali competition, in which they keep losing. Shama is in love with Amaan, but he does not know this. Amaan begins to compose shayaris for the competition and very quickly he carves a niche for himself in the musical world. However, submerged in the painful memory of his lost love Shabnam, Amaan does not realise Shama's love for him. Soon, he becomes the heart and soul of Shama's musical troupe. With Amaan's beautiful voice and shayaris, Shama's group attains popularity and wins the competition.

A shattered and imprisoned Shabnam overhears Amaan's voice on radio and learns that Amaan is still in Lucknow. Shabnam somehow reaches one of Aman's poetic duels. Shama faints during the program when she learns that Amaan is in love with someone else. Her illness gives a platform for Shabnam and Amaan to meet each other. Khan Bhadur and Shekhar reach the spot searching for the missing Shabnam. At this point Shabnam's mother revolts against Khan Bahadur, for she wants her daughter to be happy. At the end, Khan Bhadur gives in and the lovers reunite on another rainy night.

== Cast ==
- Madhubala as Shabnam
- Bharat Bhushan as Amaan Hyderabadi / Mirza Kamal Lakhnauwi
- Shyama as Shama
- Ratna Bhushan as Shabab, Shama's sister
- K. N. Singh as Police commissioner Khan Bahadur (Shabnam's father)
- Mumtaz Begum as Begum Khan Bahadur (Shabnam's mother)
- Chandrashekhar as Inspector Shekhar (Amaan's friend)
- Baby Shobha as Razia (Shabnam's sister)
- Peace Kanwal as Shanti
- Praveen Paul as Aftab's mother
- Rashid Khan as Advocate Sudhakar
- Khurshid Bawra as Shashi

== Themes ==
The story features a number of innovative themes while maintaining the basic form of a love story. It has particularly strong female characters who are independent-minded and choose their own loves and destiny. Conflicts are not so much between the wishes of the parents and children about whom the children will marry, as is a common theme in Indian movies, but among the main characters and the duplicitous signals men and women send each other. The movie glorifies the lives of "nautch girls" not often regarded highly in Indian society. Although it features Muslim characters, the movie seamlessly shows the universality of sensual love.

== Soundtrack ==
Barsat Ki Rat

Soundtrack album by Roshan
- Released: 1960
- Genre: Feature film soundtrack
- Length: 47:00
- Language: Hindi
- Label: Saregama
- Producer: Roshan

The soundtrack of Barsat Ki Rat was composed by Roshan, and lyrics were penned by Sahir Ludhianavi. It was the second best-selling soundtrack of 1960 after Mughal-e-Azam. The song "Zindagi Bhar Nahin Bhoolegi" was a chartbuster, and was on the top in the Binaca Geetmala's annual list of 1960.

The popular qawwalis “Na To Karavan Ki Talash Hai” and “Yeh Ishq Ishq Hai” were both inspired by the classic 1950s Sufi qawwali “Na To Butkade Ki Talab Mujhe”. This original piece was written by Ameer Bakhsh Sabri and composed and performed by the Pakistani qawwali duo Ustad Fateh Ali Khan and Ustad Mubarak Ali Khan (Nusrat Fateh Ali Khan’s father and uncle, respectively). While Sahir Ludhianvi wrote many new lyrics for the film versions, some lines were adapted or taken verbatim from the original kalam. Similarly, the film’s other notable qawwali, “Nigah-e-Naaz Ke Maaron Ka Haal Kya Hoga” (often shortened to “Nigah-e-Naaz Ke”), drew its melodic inspiration and central hook from Fateh Ali Khan and Mubarak Ali Khan's qawwali “Sahar Qareeb Hai Taaron Ka Haal Kya Hoga” (written by Sehba Akhtar), particularly adapting the line “Teri nigah ke maaron ka haal kya hoga.” Producer R. Chandra, elder brother of the film’s lead actor Bharat Bhushan, had personally obtained permission from Fateh Ali Khan and Mubarak Ali Khan before adapting their qawwalis for the soundtrack, although the original artists never received any formal credit. Reportedly, R. Chandra had first approached composer Khayyam for the project. However, Khayyam declined because he refused to adapt or recreate someone else’s existing qawwali compositions, preferring to create entirely original music. Roshan then took over as the film’s music director and had no qualms about adapting the pieces.

Rediff.com, calling the film's music its lifeline, placed "Na To Karavan Ki Talash Hai" at the second place in the "Bollywood's Top 10 qawwalis."

Songs
No.	Title	Singer(s)	Length
1.	"Zindagi Bhar Nahi Bhoolegi" (Raga Yaman Kalyan)	Mohammed Rafi	4:05
2.	"Garjat Barsat Sawan Aayo Re" (Raga Gaud Malhar)	Suman Kalyanpur & Kamal Barot	3:12
3.	"Jee Chahta Hai Choom Loon"	Asha Bhosle, Sudha Malhotra, Balbir & Bande Hasan	6:27
4.	"Main Ne Shayad Tumhen Pehle Bhi" (Raga Pilu)	Mohammed Rafi	3:45
5.	"Mujhe Mil Gaya Bahana"	Lata Mangeshkar	3:20
6.	"Na To Karavan Ki Talash Hai" (Raga Kalavati)	Manna Dey, Asha Bhosle, Sudha Malhotra, S. D. Batish & Mohammed Rafi	11:48
7.	"Nigah-E-Naaz Ke"	Asha Bhosle, Sudha Malhotra & Shankar Shambhu	4:50
8.	"Yeh Hai Ishq Ishq" (Raga Khamaj)	Manna Dey, Mohammed Rafi, S. D. Batish & Sudha Malhotra	7:06
9.	"Zindagi Bhar Nahin" (Raga Yaman Kalyan)	Lata Mangeshkar & Mohammed Rafi	3:18
Total length:			47:00

== Release ==
The film was released at Lamington Theatre, Bombay, on 9 December 1960.

== Reception ==
=== Box office ===
In India, the film had a box office gross of ₹3.5 crore, with a nett of ₹1.75 crore, becoming the second highest-grossing film of 1960. The Best of the Year gave its inflation-adjusted nett as ₹516.8 crore. Box Office magazine calculated its inflation-adjusted gross by comparing the collection with the price of gold in 1960, which gave it an adjusted gross of ₹785.88 crore in 2011.

The film was listed at number 22 by Box Office magazine in their list of "Top 50 Film of Last 50 Years" which feature all-time highest-grossing Bollywood films by using the relative price of gold in different years to arrive at a hypothetical current value of box-office collections of past films.

=== Critical reception ===
Contemporary reviews were generally positive. On 30 December, The Indian Express noted Santoshi's direction and performances, particularly of Madhubala and Shyama. Most of the praise was directed towards the film's "outstanding feature", the qawwalis.

Recent reviewers have acclaimed the film for its music and performances. Film critic Venkat Parsa of The Siasat Daily applauded the innovative themes Barsaat Ki Raat uses and stated that the film "stands apart [and] breaks away from the past trends". Parsa also noted the lyrics of "Zindagi Bhar Nahi Bhoolegi", which begins with Amaan narrating his encounter with Shabnam and then singing the "graphic detail", that proves that lyricist Sahir Ludhianvi was "a progressive and revolutionary poet". In the conclusion, Parsa described the film as the "greatest-ever musical of all times of the Indian cinema". Writer Monica Kar, in a typical mixed review, found the story to be "a little predictable and not very exciting by modern standards" but its treatment to be "delightful". She appreciated the scene in which Amaan and Shabnam meet: "[It] portrays confusion, a little fear, a little mystery, a little attraction. Madhubala is brilliant in this one scene." Madhubala's dramatic performance has been especially noted by critics and is cited to be one of the finest of her career.

== Legacy ==
Barsat Ki Rat is considered a milestone in the history of Indian cinema and is known for popularizing the romantic musical genre in films.

=== In popular culture ===
Canadian singer Buffy Sainte-Marie covered the song "Maayus To Hoon Vade Se Tere" from the movie, which she titled "Mayoo Sto Hoon". The song was released on her debut album, It's My Way!, in 1964.

The songs "Na To Karavan Ki Talash Hai" and "Yeh Hai Ishq Ishq" were remade for the 2025 Indian film Dhurandhar by Shashwat Sachdev as "Ishq Jalakar (Karvaan)", sung by Shahzad Ali, Subhadeep Das Chowdhury and Armaan Khan, and "Move (Yeh Ishq Ishq)", sung by Sonu Nigam and Reble, respectively.

== See also ==
- List of Bollywood films of 1960
- 100 crore club
