= Do Dilon Ki Dastaan (1966 film) =

- Do Dilon Ki Dastaan Cover
- Directed by: Pramod Chakravorty; Pradeep Kumar
- Produced by: Deep Khosla & Pradeep Kumar
- Starring: Pradeep Kumar; Vyjayanthimala
- Music by: O. P. Nayyar
- Production companies: Deep & Pradeep Productions
- Release date: 1966
- Country: India
- Language: Hindi

Do Dilon Ki Dastaan is a 1966 Hindi-language drama film directed by Pramod Chakravorty and Pradeep Kumar, starring Vyjayanthimala and Om Prakash in lead roles and music by O. P. Nayyar. The film was launched with Pramod Chakravorty at the helm. However, the film's producer and hero Pradeep Kumar, took over the reins at some point. It was his only film as a director.

== Cast ==
- Pradeep Kumar
- Vyjayanthimala
- Shashikala
- Rehman
- Om Prakash
- Nazir Hussain

== Soundtrack ==
Song	Singer	Lyricist
"Hum Toh Loot Gaye Mohabbat Mein	Mohammed Rafi, Asha Bhosle	Shewan Rizvi
"Aji, Pehli Mulaqat Mein Nahin Pyar Jataya Karte"	Mohammed Rafi, Asha Bhosle	Raja Mehdi Ali Khan
"Milti Hai Agar Nazron Se Nazar, Sharmate Ho Kyun"	Mohammed Rafi, Asha Bhosle	Raja Mehdi Ali Khan
"Mujhe Akhiyon Pe Apni Yakeen Hai"	Mohammed Rafi, Asha Bhosle	Raja Mehdi Ali Khan
"Ab Yeh Machalta Sama, Ae Mere Jaan-e-Jaan"	Asha Bhosle	Raja Mehdi Ali Khan
"Kahiye Janab-E-Ali Kahan Rahe"	Asha Bhosle	Raja Mehdi Ali Khan
"Chal Beta Left, Chal Beta Right"	Mohammed Rafi	Raja Mehdi Ali Khan
"Har Jagah Aapke Kadmon Ke Nishaan Milte Hai"		Shamsul Huda Bihari
