= Alli Petra Pillai =

1959 film

- Theatrical release poster
- Directed by: K. Somu
- Screenplay by: A. P. Nagarajan
- Story by: Mukhram Sharma
- Based on: Tonga-wali
- Produced by: A. Maruthakasi; K. V. Mahadevan; Violin Mahadevan; V. K. Muthuramalingam
- Starring: S. S. Rajendran; S. V. Sahasranamam; M. N. Rajam; Pandari Bai
- Cinematography: V. K. Gopanna
- Edited by: T. V. Jayarangan
- Music by: K. V. Mahadevan
- Production company: M. M. Productions
- Distributed by: Sri Lakshmi Pictures Circuit
- Release date: 31 July 1959
- Country: India
- Language: Tamil

Alli Petra Pillai (transl. The son of Alli) is a 1959 Indian Tamil-language drama film directed by K. Somu and written by A. P. Nagarajan. Produced by A. Maruthakasi, K. V. Mahadevan, Violin Mahadevan and V. K. Muthuramalingam, the film stars S. S. Rajendran, S. V. Sahasranamam, M. N. Rajam and Pandari Bai. It is a remake of the Hindi film Tonga-wali (1955). Cinematography was handled V. K. Gopanna, and editing by T. V. Jayarangan. The film was released on 31 July 1959, and failed at the box office.

== Cast ==
Male cast

- S. S. Rajendran
- S. V. Sahasranamam
- A. Karunanidhi
- V. K. Ramasamy
- K. Sarangapani

Male cast

- M. N. Rajam
- Pandari Bai

== Production ==
Besides producing the film under M. M. Productions, A. Maruthakasi also worked as lyricist. The other producers were K. V. Mahadevan (who also worked as music composer), Violin Mahadevan and V. K. Muthuramalingam. The film prominently features a horse, which was brought from Mangalore by Maruthakasi. This was the only film Maruthakasi had produced and was supposed to be completed within six months; instead it took two years as Maruthakasi was busy writing lyrics and also false rumours of him not writing lyrics led to huge problems.

== Soundtrack ==
Music was scored by K. V. Mahadevan while the lyrics were penned by A. Maruthakasi. Two songs from the film – "Ejaman Petra Selvame" and "Paisaavai Pottu Naisaaga Vaangi" – attained popularity. The former is set in the Carnatic raga known as Vakulabharanam.

Song	Singer/s	Duration
"Asai Atthaan Kai Pidikka"	P. Susheela	03:47
"Arivirukkum.... Idhu Theriyum"	T. M. Soundararajan	03:01
"Ammaa Appaa Yenru"	Sirkazhi Govindarajan	01:17
"Summa Summa Sirichukittu"	T. M. Soundararajan & P. Susheela	03:16
"Kaatthiruken Veliyoram"	Thiruchi Loganathan & L. R. Eswari	03:16
"Paisaavai Pottu Naisaaga Vaangi"	S. C. Krishnan	02:35
"Ejaman Petra Selvame"	G. Ramanathan	03:01
"Nalla Naalu Romba Nalla Naalu"	T. M. Soundararajan, Sirkazhi Govindarajan & Thiruchi Loganathan	03:15
"Nalla Naalu Romba Nalla Naalu"	T. M. Soundararajan & P. Susheela	01:39
"Onnum Onnum Serndhaakka"	Sirkazhi Govindarajan & Jikki	02:55
"Idhukku Adhu Thevala"	Sirkazhi Govindarajan & Jikki	03:12

== Release and reception ==
Alli Petra Pillai was released on 31 July 1959, by Sri Lakshmi Pictures Circuit. The film was a commercial failure, and made Maruthakasi face huge debts.
