= Sampoorna Ramayana =

- Poster
- Directed by: Babubhai Mistry
- Written by: C.K. Mast (dialogue)
- Screenplay by: Vishwanath Pande
- Story by: Narottam Vyas; Madhur
- Based on: Ramayana by Valmiki
- Produced by: Homi Wadia (Basant Pictures)
- Starring: Mahipal; Anita Guha
- Cinematography: Aga Hasham
- Edited by: Kamlakar
- Music by: Vasant Desai; Bharat Vyas (Lyrics)
- Production companies: Basant Pictures, Wadia Brothers
- Release date: 1961
- Running time: 183 min.
- Country: India
- Language: Hindi

Sampoorna Ramayana (transl. The Complete Ramayana) is a 1961 Indian Hindi-language Hindu mythological film directed by Babubhai Mistry, based on the Hindu epic Ramayana by Valmiki, starring Mahipal and Anita Guha as Rama and Sita respectively. The film was a box office hit, and became a milestone in the history of Hindu mythology. It was the second significant Hindi film based on Rama, after Vijay Bhatt's hugely popular Ram Rajya (1943). Babubhai, known for his special effects throughout his career, made extensive use of effects to enhance dramatics. The film also made lead actor Anita Guha, who played the role of Sita, a household name. Lata Mangeshkar sang two of the most top-class semi-classical songs in this movie, namely "San Sanan, Sanan, Sanana, Ja Re O Pawan" and "Badalon Barso Nayan Ki Or Se", which are still very popular.

== Cast ==
- Mahipal as Rama
- Anita Guha as Seeta
- B. M. Vyas as Ravana
- Sulochana Latkar as Kaikeyi
- Lalita Pawar as Manthara
- Helen as Surpanakha
- Manhar Desai|Pal Sharma as Hanuman
- Achala Sachdev as Kaushalya
- Krishna Kumari
- Raj Kumar
- Anand Kumar
- Uma Dutt
- Badri Prasad
- Paul Sharma
- Sushil Kumar
- Gopi Krishna as dancer

== Soundtrack ==
The film's music was by Vasant Desai and the lyrics were by Bharat Vyas.

Track #	Song	Singer(s)	Raga
1	"Baadalon Barso Nain Ki Kor Se"	Lata Mangeshkar	
2	"Bolo Sabhi Jai Ram"	Mahendra Kapoor	
3	"Mere Jeewan Ki Parnakuti Mein"	Lata Mangeshkar	
4	"Baar Baar Bagiya Mein Koyal Na Bole"	Asha Bhonsle	
5	"Dharti Kyon Veeprit Hui"	Manna Dey, Lata Mangeshkar	
6	"Dole Re Dole Re Pren Hamko Mila Vardan"	Mohammed Rafi, Lata Mangeshkar	
7	"Ham Ramchandra Ki Chandrakala Mein Bhi"	Lata Mangeshkar, Asha Bhonsle	
8	"Jaa Re O Pavan Door Desh Le Jaa"	Lata Mangeshkar	
9	"More Ram Kab Aaogye"	Lata Mangeshkar	
10	"Ghar Aaye Bhagwan"	Mohammed Rafi, Lata Mangeshkar	
11	"San sanan jare o pawan"	Lata Mangeshkar	Chandrakauns

== Remakes ==
It was remade in 1981 from Sita's perspective as Ramayan - Katha Shri Ram Ki by Girish Manukant, starring Manhar Desai, Ranjeet Raj, Anjana.

== Sources ==
- Gregory J Watkins (2008). Teaching Religion and Film. Oxford University Press. ISBN 978-0195335989.
- Freek L. Bakker (2009). The Challenge of the Silver Screen: An Analysis of the Cinematic Portraits of Jesus, Rama, Buddha and Muhammad. BRILL. ISBN 978-9004168619.
