= Goonj Uthi Shehnai =

- Poster
- Directed by: Vijay Bhatt
- Produced by: Vijay Bhatt
- Starring: Rajendra Kumar; Ameeta; Anita Guha; I. S. Johar
- Music by: Vasant Desai; Bharat Vyas (lyrics)
- Release date: 29 May 1959
- Running time: 174 minutes
- Country: India
- Language: Hindi
- Box office: Rs. 1,80,00,000

Goonj Uthi Shehnai (lit. 'The Call of the Shehnai') (Note: Contextually, it means that the wedding bells have started ringing.) is a 1959 Hindi film directed by Vijay Bhatt, with Rajendra Kumar, Ameeta, Anita Guha and I. S. Johar as leads. The film has music by Vasant Desai and lyrics by Bharat Vyas, and the duo created numerous hits such as "Jivan Men Piya Tera Sath Rahe" sung by Lata Mangeshkar and Mohd. Rafi, and Lata's "Tere Sur Aur Mere Geet" and "Dil Ka Khilona Hai Toot Gaya".

The film narrates the story of a Shehnai player, and features a shehnai recitals by maestro Ustad Bismillah Khan throughout the film. There is also Jugalbandi between him and Sitar player, Abdul Halim Jaffar Khan. p. 205. Notably, the film featured music from popular New Delhi based musician Harikesh Pushpapathan.

The film was the fifth highest grosser of the year and was declared a "Hit" at Box Office India and became the first big hit of actor Rajendra Kumar, who was soon giving dates four years from the day of signing.

== Cast ==
- Rajendra Kumar – Kishan
- Ameeta – Gopi
- Anita Guha – Ramkali (Rami)
- I. S. Johar – Kanhaiya
- Ulhas as Raghunath Maharaj
- Manmohan Krishna – Gangaram
- Leela Mishra – Jamuna
- Pratap Kumar – Shekhar
- Prem Dhawan – Banjara
- Ram Moorti – Uncle
- Pramila – choti kaki

== Awards and nominations ==
- 1960: Filmfare Award
  - Filmfare Best Supporting Actress Award: Anita Guha: Nominated

== Soundtrack ==
The soundtrack includes the following tracks, composed by Vasant Desai, and with lyrics by Bharat Vyas, also featuring shehnai pieces by noted classical instrumentalist Ustad Bismillah Khan, with vocal renderings by Amir Khan, a Hindustani classical music vocalist.

Goonj Uthi Shehnai

Soundtrack album by Vasant Desai
- Released: 1959 (India)
- Genre: Film soundtrack
- Label: EMI
- Producer: Vasant Desai

Vasant Desai chronology
Samarat Prithviraj Chauvan (1959)	Goonj Uthi Shehnai (1959)	Ardhangini (1959)

Song	Singer (s)	Raga
"Teri Shehnai Bole"	Lata Mangeshkar, Mohd. Rafi	
"Tere Sur Aur Mere Geet"	Lata Mangeshkar	Bihag
"Maine Peena Seekh Liya"	Mohd. Rafi	
"Jivan Men Piya Tera Sath Rahe"	Lata Mangeshkar, Mohd. Rafi	Jaijaivanti
"Haule Haule Ghoonghat Pat Khole"	Lata Mangeshkar, Mohd. Rafi	
"Akhiyan Bhool Gain Hain Sona"	Lata Mangeshkar, Geeta Dutt	
"Mujhko Agar Bhool Jaoge Tum"	Lata Mangeshkar	Bihag
"Kah Do Koi Na Kare Yahan Pyaar"	Mohd. Rafi	Jogiya (raga)
"Dil Ka Khilona Hai Toot Gaya"	Lata Mangeshkar	Bhairavi (Hindustani)
