= Ratna Bhushan =

Indian actress

- Born: Ratna; Maharashtra, India
- Occupation: Actress
- Years active: 1955–1990
- Notable work: Barsaat Ki Raat (1960), Putra Vhava Aisa (1961)
- Spouse: Bharat Bhushan (m. 1967; died 1992)
- Family: Anuradha Patel (Step-granddaughter)

Ratna Bhushan (born Ratna) was an Indian actress who appeared mainly in both Hindi cinema and Marathi cinema for over three decades. While she is celebrated for her roles in iconic Hindi musicals like Barsaat Ki Raat (1960), she was also a leading lady in the Marathi film industry during its formative years in the 1960s.

== Career ==
=== Early work and breakthrough (1950s–1960) ===
Ratna began her career in the mid-1950s, appearing in supporting roles during the height of the 'Golden Age of Hindi Cinema'. Her breakout role came in the 1960 musical blockbuster Barsaat Ki Raat, directed by P. L. Santoshi. Portraying the character "Shabab," she played the vibrant sister of Shama (played by the popular actress Shyama) and a close companion to the character Shabnam, (played by the legendary actress Madhubala). The film's massive success, particularly its qawwali sequences, brought Ratna significant national visibility.

=== Stardom in Marathi Cinema ===
Throughout the 1960s, while continuing her work in Mumbai, Ratna established herself as a notable lead actress in Marathi cinema. She was frequently cast in social dramas and family entertainers that are now considered classics. Notable among these were Putra Vhava Aisa (1961), which won the National Film Award for Best Feature Film in Marathi, and the comedy Javai Maza Bhala (1962).Her ability to move between the linguistic nuances of Hindi and Marathi made her a versatile asset to filmmakers in Western India.

=== Later years and character roles ===
As she transitioned into the later stages of her career in the 1970s and 1980s, Ratna moved into character roles, often playing maternal figures or elegant matriarchs. She appeared in popular commercial films such as Pyar Jhukta Nahin (1985) alongside Mithun Chakraborty and Padmini Kolhapure. In the same year, she played a major role as Mrs. Bennet (named Sushila) in the cult Doordarshan series Trishna (an adaptation of Pride and Prejudice). Her final credited roles appeared in the late 1980s, marking a career that spanned nearly 35 years in the industry.

== Personal life ==
In 1967, Ratna married the actor and producer Bharat Bhushan. The two had shared the screen in several films, most notably Barsaat Ki Raat. Ratna's marriage to Bharat Bhushan took place during a period when the actor was facing severe financial decline due to the failure of his production ventures and a shift in audience tastes. Ratna was widely noted in film circles for her steadfast loyalty, staying by his side as they moved from a luxurious bungalow to a small tenement in Malad. She remained married to him until his death in 1992. She was notably devoted to her family during their later years. She remained a steadfast support for Bharat Bhushan as he faced severe financial decline, moving with him from their once-luxurious bungalows to a small tenement in Malad. Her stepdaughter, Aparajita Bhushan, later became a well-known actress herself, famously portraying Mandodari in the landmark television series Ramayan. Ratna's step-granddaughter is the film actress Anuradha Patel.

== Death ==
She died in the early 2000s in Mumbai. Following Bharat Bhushan's death in 1992, Ratna Bhushan withdrew from public life. While it is confirmed by family members in later interviews that she has since died, the exact date and circumstances of her death remain private and were not widely reported in the media. She is remembered in film history not only for her contributions to the Marathi and Hindi screen but also for her devotion to Bharat Bhushan during his most difficult financial years, a story often cited as one of the most poignant examples of loyalty in the Indian film industry.

== Selected filmography ==
Year	Film	Language	Role
1958	Dilli Ka Thug	Hindi	Radha Sharma
1959	Kal Hamara Hai	Hindi	Supporting role
1960	Barsaat Ki Raat	Hindi	Shabab
1961	Putra Vhava Aisa	Marathi	Lead role
1962	Javai Maza Bhala	Marathi	Lead role
1964	Dooj Ka Chand	Hindi	
1965	Bharat Milap	Hindi	
1978	Gangaa Saagar	Hindi	
1984	Shravan Kumar	Hindi	
1985	Pyar Jhukta Nahin	Hindi	
1986	Naasamajh	Hindi	
