= Passport (1961 film) =

1961 film by Pramod Chakravorty

- Theatrical release poster
- Directed by: Pramod Chakravorty
- Produced by: Pramod Chakravorty; C. M. Thakker; Nutan Films
- Starring: Madhubala; Pradeep Kumar
- Music by: Kalyanji–Anandji
- Release date: 6 October 1961
- Running time: 135 minutes
- Country: India
- Language: Hindi

Passport is a 1961 Indian Bollywood drama film directed by Pramod Chakravorty. The film stars Madhubala and Pradeep Kumar.

Passport was released in October 1961 and became a commercial success. It was the last film to star Madhubala and Kumar together, and also one of the last films of Madhubala.

== Plot ==
The film starts with a smuggler Samson D'Mello, bringing some jewellery illegally to India from Nairobi. However the customs police detect it, as soon as he crosses the customs barrier. A chase starts, at the end of which D'Mello dies as his car meets an accident. It soon turns out that he was smuggling jewellery for Shamsher Singh (K N Singh), who was a partner of Bhagwandas (Nazir Hussain) who owns a jewellery shop.

While assisting the Bombay Police in arresting jewellery smugglers, Shekhar (Pradeep Kumar) suspects Bhagwandas (Nazir Hussain). But soon, he discovers that Bhagwandas is the father of Rita, his love interest (Madhubala).

Meanwhile, an accountant of Bhagwandas dies mysteriously. This accountant had knowledge of all ill deals of the duo. Shekhar tries to find the guilty man. He comes across Shamsher Singh and tries to catch him. Bhagwandas's daughter Rita tries to help Shekhar. When he tries to inform the police, Singh starts to blackmail him. Shekhar tries to stop Singh from smuggling but instead, Singh tries to kill Shekhar. Soon the police discover that Singh is actually Shyamlal who has run from Nairobi after murdering someone. Shekhar helps the police to catch Singh.

== Cast ==
The main cast of the film included:

- Madhubala as Rita Bhagwandas
- Pradeep Kumar as Shekhar
- Helen as Mary
- K. N. Singh as Shamsher Singh / Shyamlal
- Nazir Hussain as Bhagwandas
- Mumtaz Begum as Mrs. Bhagwandas
- Shivraj as Benny Prasad
- Dulari as Mrs. Benny Prasad
- Jagdish Raj as Police Inspector
- Moni Chatterjee as Passport officer
- Narmada Shankar as Munimji
- C. S. Dubey as Employee at Bhagwandas Jewellers
- Moolchand as Employee at Bhagwandas Jewellers
- Bhagwan Sinha as employee at jewellers
- Kumud Tripathi as Joseph Pinto, employee at jewellers
- V. Gopal as Janardan
- Mirajkar as Swami, employee at jewellers
- Manju as Garib Singh, employee at jewellers
- Rajan Kapoor as Police Inspector Verma in Suite
- Lillian as Lily
- Shetty as Singh's driver
- Pachhi as Turkish diamond smuggler

== Soundtrack ==
The soundtrack of Passport was composed by Kalyanji–Anandji and lyrics were penned by Qamar Jalalabadi and Farooq Kaiser. "Saaz-E-Dil Chhed De" was a chartbuster.

Track listing
No.	Title	Lyrics	Singer(s)	Length
1.	"Nazar Ka Jhuk Jana"	Qamar Jalalabadi	Geeta Dutt	3:35
2.	"Saaz-E-Dil Chhed De"	Farooq Qaiser	Lata Mangeshkar & Mohammed Rafi	3:49
3.	"Sun Ja Dastan Yun Na Sata"	Qamar Jalalabadi	Subir Sen	3:23
4.	"Tauba Tauba Ho Tauba Meri Jaan"	Qamar Jalalabadi	Geeta Dutt	4:06
5.	"Ja Raha Hai Kyon Deewane"		Geeta Dutt	3:53

== Release ==
The film opened at Swastik Theatre, Bombay, on 6 October 1961.

== Reception ==
Passport was released at the peak of Madhubala's popularity and craze. The film consequently emerged as one of the biggest commercial successes of the year 1961, according to Filmfare.

=== Critical reception ===
A Times of India review, dated 8 October 1961, carried the headline: "Passport: A Thriller That Fails To Pass Muster".
