= Police (1958 film) =

1958 film by Kalidas

- Poster
- Directed by: Kalidas Batabyal
- Written by: Nasir Hussain (dialogues)
- Screenplay by: Nasir Hussain
- Story by: Deep Khosla
- Produced by: Deep Khosla; Pradeep Kumar
- Starring: Madhubala; Pradeep Kumar
- Cinematography: J. P. Kapadia
- Edited by: Raj Talwar
- Music by: Hemant Kumar
- Production companies: Deep & Pradeep Productions
- Release date: 1958
- Running time: 146 min.
- Country: India
- Language: Hindi

Police is a 1958 Indian Hindi-language action-thriller film produced by Deep Khosla and Pradeep Kumar and presented by the latter and, besides starring him opposite Madhubala and alongside Nadira. The film was directed by Pradeep Kumar's brother Kalidas Batabyal. The music of the film was composed by Hemant Kumar.

== Plot ==
When an airplane brings ex dacoit Rangooni (Pradeep Kumar) from Singapore to Bombay, Inspector Mehra (Raj Mehra) looks upon Rangooni's return with well-founded suspicion. His arrival in Bombay disturbs the activities of a gang of jewel-theft specialists, led by man-about-town-Ramesh (Anwar Hussain). Rangooni foils the activities of the gang by forestalling the gangster. Manju (Madhubala), daughter of Bahadur Sunderdas, who has Rai encountered Rangooni many times, is excited by the prospect of getting the dacoit arrested and hopes to get a lot of publicity by so doing.

Ramesh, constantly thwarted by Rangooni, lays a trap for his opponent but in the last smashing chase scene is unmasked for what he is.

But who is Rangooni? What is the motive behind his seemingly incongruous actions?

== Cast ==
The main cast of the film was:

- Madhubala as Manju
- Pradeep Kumar as Rangooni and Kiran Kumar (fake Rangooni) (dual role)
- Nadira as Champakali
- Om Prakash as Rai Bahadur Kundandas
- Raj Mehra as Inspector Mehra
- Anwar Hussain as Ramesh
- Dhumal as Chakrapani Goswami Vitthalvasan Pillai
- Bhagwan as the beach dancer and performer of the song "Dil Ko Lagela Mohabbat Ka Chaska..." (guest appearance)

== Soundtrack ==
The soundtrack was composed by Hemant Kumar and the lyrics were penned by Majrooh Sultanpuri and Neelkanth Tiwari (uncredited).

Song	Singer(s)	Lyricist
"Chale Ham Kahaan Kaho..."	Hemant Kumar and Geeta Dutt	Majrooh Sultanpuri
"O O Baby Mudke Zara..."	Hemant Kumar and Geeta Dutt	Majrooh Sultanpuri
"Mere Tum Ho Phir Kya Hai..."	Hemant Kumar and Geeta Dutt	Majrooh Sultanpuri
"O Chup Ja Hamare Dil Mein..."	Hemant Kumar and Geeta Dutt	Majrooh Sultanpuri
"Sunle Piya Dhadke Jiya..."	Hemant Kumar and Geeta Dutt	Majrooh Sultanpuri
"Dil Pe Kaisa Yeh Tune Khanjar Mara Re..."	Hemant Kumar and Geeta Dutt	Majrooh Sultanpuri
"Dil Lo Lagela Mohabbat Ka Chaska..."	Mohammed Rafi	Neelkanth Tiwari (uncredited)

== Release ==
The film premiered at Imperial Theatre, Bombay, on 27 June 1958.

== Reception ==
=== Critical reception ===
A Times of India review, dated 29 June 1958, carried the headline: "Police Plays Hide And Seek With Credibility".

In a Singapore Free Press review published on 8 August 1959, the critic praised the music and fast pacing of the story, but found the screenplay to be inconsistent. The lead actress received appreciation: "Madhubala is the heroine and what a versatile young person she is! It comes as a pleasant surprise to see her perform Western dances so well."

=== Box office ===
According to trade analyst V. P. Sathe, the film performed well commercially and particularly did "record collections" in Bombay (now Mumbai); the first week collections in Bombay territory stood at ₹1.16 lakh.
