= Ek Shola =

- Directed by: Chander Saigal
- Written by: Nasir Hussain
- Screenplay by: Mohan Kumar; Chander Saigal; Karunesh Thakur
- Story by: Deep Khosla
- Produced by: Pradeep Kumar; Deep Khosla
- Starring: Pradeep Kumar; Mala Sinha; Shubha Khote
- Cinematography: M. Ramchandra
- Edited by: Raj Talwar
- Music by: Madan Mohan
- Production companies: Deep & Pradeep Productions
- Distributed by: Deep & Pradeep Productions
- Release date: 1958
- Country: India
- Language: Hindi

Ek Shola is a 1958 Hindi drama film directed by Chander Saigal starring Pradeep Kumar and Mala Sinha. This film was released in 1958 under the banner of Deep & Pradeep Productions.

== Cast ==
- Pradeep Kumar
- Mala Sinha
- Shobha Khote
- Tun Tun
- Leela Mishra

== Soundtrack ==
Song	Singer
"Kahin Chal Na De"	Mohammed Rafi, Asha Bhosle
"Malik Mai Puchhta Hoon"	Mohammed Rafi
"Chanda Se Bhi Pyara Hai"	Asha Bhosle, Geeta Dutt
"Jaadugar Tune Kaisa Jaadu Yeh Kiya"	Asha Bhosle
"Ham Kaala, Tum White"	Geeta Dutt, Mohammed Rafi
"Chudi Chhanke Chalun Main Jab Tanke"	Asha Bhosle
"Habba Ho Re Hayya"	Asha Bhosle
"Jhum Ke Man Matwala Mera"	Asha Bhosle
