= Bharat Vyas =

Indian lyricist

Bharat Vyas (6 January 1918 – 4 July 1982) was a noted Indian lyricist who wrote the songs for Hindi films in 1950s and 1960s.

== Biography ==
Vyas was born in Bikaner, then the capital of Bikaner State of Rajputana Agency in British India, but currently in the Indian state of Rajasthan. His younger brother was the actor Brij Mohan Vyas (1920–2013). He studied B.Com. at Calcutta and after completing his studies he came to Bombay. His first film as lyricist was Duhaai (1943). He was the writer of the prayer song, "Ae Malik Tere Bande Hum" and "Ye Kaun Chitrakar Hai". He directed a Bollywood film Rangila Rajasthan (1949) for which he wrote the lyrics and composed three songs. He also wrote the lyrics for film Mata Mahakali (1968); a song is "Jo ugta hai be dhalta hai"

Some of his evergreen poems:

- Daulat ke jhoote nashe me jo choor (Oonchi Haveli)
- Aa laut ke aaja mere meet (Rani Rupmati)
- Nirbal se ladaai balwan ki (Toofan Aur Diya)
- Aay maalik tere bande hum (Do Aankhen Baara Haath)
- Saanjh ho gai prabhu (Jai Chitor)
- Maine peena seekh liya (Goonj Uthi Shehnaai)
- Tere sur aur mere geet (Goonj Uthi Shehnaai)
- Kahe do koi na kare yahan pyar (Goonj Uthi Shehnaai)
- Dil ka khillona haye toot gaya (Goonj Uthi Shehnaai)
- Haan diwaana hoon maye (Saranga)
- Saranga teri yaad me (Saranga)
- Tu chhupi hai kahan (Navrang)
- Aadha hai chandrama (Navrang)
- Tum mere maye teri (Navrang)
- Aaj madhuvatas dole (Stree)
- O nirdayee preetam (Stree)
- Rain bhaye so ja re panchhi (Ram Rajya)
- Jyot se jyot jagaate chalo (Sant Gyaneshwar)
- Bahut din beete (Sant Gyaneshwar)
- Tum gagan ke chandrama ho (Sati Savitri)
- Jeevan dor tumhi sang baandhi (Sati Savitri)
- Mann Ki gehrai

He died on 4 July 1982 in Mumbai.

== Filmography ==
Some of films for which he wrote songs are:

- Sawan Aya Re
- Bijali
- Pyar Ki Pyas
- Tamasha
- Muqaddar
- Shri Ganesh Janma
- Aankhen
- Hamara Ghar
- Raj Mukut
- Janmashtami
- Nakhre
- Bhola Shankar
- Shri Chaitanya Mahaprabhu (1953)
- Parineeta
- Jagaduru Shankaracharya
- Andher Nagari Chaupat Raja
- Oonchi Haweli
- Toofan Aur Diya
- Janam Janam Ke Phere
- Do Aankhen Barah Haath
- Bedard Zamana Kya Jane (1959)
- Fashion
- Goonj Uthi Shehnai (1959)
- Kavi Kalidas
- Suvarna Sundari
- Mausi
- Angulimaal (1960)
- Sampoorna Ramayana (1961)
- Stree (1961)
- Navrang
- Rani Roopmati
- Chandramukhi
- Sant Gyaneshwar (1964)
- Purnima (1965 film)
- Mahabharat (1965 film)
- Sati Savitri
- Boond Jo Ban Gayee Moti (1967)
