= Daana Paani (1953 film) =

1953 film by V. M. Vyas

- Poster
- Directed by: V. M. Vyas
- Starring: Meena Kumari; Bharat Bhushan; Master Shashiraj
- Music by: Mohan Junior
- Production company: Sunrise Pictures Productions
- Release date: 1953
- Country: India
- Language: Hindi

Daana Paani (transl. Grain and water) is a 1953 Indian Hindi-language film starring Meena Kumari and Bharat Bhushan in lead roles. The music was composed by Mohan Junior. After the success of Baiju Bawra released in 1952, Bhushan and Kumari were paired again in this film. A 15 year old Shashi Kapoor appeared as a child artist with the name Master Shashiraj in the film.

== Cast ==
- Bharat Bhushan
- Meena Kumari
- Ulhas
- Veera
- Master Shashiraj
- Vasti

== Music ==
The film had eight songs and all songs were composed by Mohan Junior, a Gujarati film composer.

1. "Koi Amir Hai Koi Gareeb Hai" – Mohammed Rafi, lyrics by: Kaif Irfani
2. "Tere Haatho Me – Duet" – Mohammed Rafi, Geeta Dutt, lyrics by: Indeevar
3. "Tum Hanse To Gham Sharmaya" – Mohammed Rafi, Shamshad Begum, lyrics by: Kaif Irfani
4. "Ishq Mujhe Aur To Kuch Yaad Nahi" – Begum Akhtar, lyrics by: Kaif Irfani
5. "Tere Haatho Me – Female version" – Rajkumari Dubey, lyrics by: Kaif Irfani
6. "Chanda Suraj Naina Tere" – Madhubala Jhaveri, lyrics by: Indeevar
7. "Mere Daddy Bade Meharba " – Madan Bharti, lyrics by: Kaif Irfani
8. "Apna To Zamane Me Bas Itna" – Madhubala Jhaveri, lyrics by: Indeevar
