= Purnima (film) =

- Directed by: Narendra Suri
- Written by: S. M. Abbas
- Produced by: Mahipatray Shah
- Starring: Dharmendra; Meena Kumari; Mehmood
- Music by: Kalyanji-Anandji
- Release date: 1965
- Country: India
- Language: Hindi

Purnima is a 1965 Indian family entertainment romance film produced by Mahipatray Shah and directed by Narendra Suri in Hindi language under the Roopkala Pictures company.

== Cast ==
- Dharmendra as Prakash
- Meena Kumari as Purnima
- Mehmood as Chimanbhai 'Kafanwala' Suratwala
- Anita Guha as Vandana Mehra
- Nasir Hussain as Ratan Lal
- Durga Khote as Sharda R. Lal

== Soundtrack ==
Purnima

Soundtrack album by Kalyanji-Anandji
- Released: 31 December 1965
- Genre: Feature film soundtrack
- Length: 28:23
- Language: Hindi
- Label: Saregama

The soundtrack album of Purnima consists of 8 songs composed by Kalyanji-Anandji the lyrics of which were written by Bharat Vyas, Gulzar, Gulshan Bawra and Prakash Mehra.

Tracklist
No.	Title	Lyrics	Singer(s)	Length
1.	"Ajab Khel Kismat Ka"	Bharat Vyas	Mohammad Rafi	03:27
2.	"Gori Nain Tumhare Kya Kahne"	Bharat Vyas	Mukesh	03:06
3.	"Humsafar Mere Humsafar"	Gulzar	Lata Mangeshkar & Mukesh	04:07
4.	"Lori Suna Suna Ke"	Gulshan Bawra	Mahmood	03:20
5.	"O Is Desh Ke Rahnewalo"	Bharat Vyas	Lata Mangeshkar	03:06
6.	"Phufaji Zara Sach Sach Kaho"	Prakash Mehra	Kamal Barot, Mahmood, Krishna Kalle	03:37
7.	"Radha Tore Kanha Ne Murli Bajai"	Bharat Vyas	Suman Kalyanpur	03:38
8.	"Tumhen Zindagi Ke Ujale Mubarak"	Gulzar	Mukesh	04:02
Total length:				28:23
