= Trishna (TV series) =

- Created by: Meena Vaishnavi
- Based on: Pride and Prejudice by: Jane Austen; (1813)
- Written by: Kamna Chandra
- Screenplay by: Kamna Chandra
- Original language: Hindi
- No. of seasons: 1
- No. of episodes: 13

Original release
- Network: DD National
- Release: 1985

Trishna is a 1985 Indian 13-episode TV show that aired on Doordarshan. It was based on Jane Austen's 1813 novel Pride and Prejudice, and suitably adapted to an Indian middle-class family in 20th-century India. All the characters of the novel were maintained in the show, with their traits shown exactly as in the book. The screenplay, written by Kamna Chandra is a faithful adaptation of Pride and Prejudice.

== Synopsis ==
In the original novel the family has five daughters, but in this series they have four daughters, the second of whom is called Rekha (Sangeeta Handa). She is honest, intelligent, and has a lively disposition. She does not think much of those who are pompous. She meets a rich, handsome guy, Rahul (Tarun Dhanrajgir) at a party, who has gone there with his friend Ravi (Vilas Kalgutkar) and sisters. She is instantly prejudiced against him due to his pride and arrogance. The elder sister, Roopa (Aparna Sharma) falls in love with the friend Ravi, whose sisters do not think much of her family and persuade him to jilt her. The role of the youngest sister, Roohi was portrayed by Kitu Gidwani and the character of Mrs. Bennet was played by Ratna Bhushan.

== Cast ==
- Aparna Sharma as Roopa, the first and eldest daughter (character based on Jane Bennet)
- Sangeeta Handa as Rekha, the second daughter (character based on Elizabeth Bennet)
- Kaushalya 'Kitu' Gidwani as Roohi, the third daughter (character based on Lydia Bennet)
- Shabana Dutt as Rita, the fourth and the youngest daughter (character based on Mary Bennet)
- Pradeep Shukla as Anand (character based on Mr. Bennet)
- Ratna Bhushan as Sushila (character based on Mrs. Bennet)
- Tarun Dhanrajgir as Rahul Mehta (character based on Mr. Darcy)
- Vilas Kalgutkar as Ravi Chopra (character based on Charles Bingley)
- Nikita Shah as Leena (character based on Caroline Bingley)
- Anita Chakravarty as Kumkum (character based on Mrs. Hurst)
- Nayan Bhatt as Prema (character based on Charlotte Lucas)
- Irshad Hashmi as Manoj (character based on Mr. Collins)
- Chhaya Arya as Smt. Laal (character based on Lady Catherine de Bourgh)
- Rishabh Shukla as Vinod (character based on Mr. Wickham)
- Monisha Patil as Neha (character based on Georgiana Darcy)
- Mr. Kumar (character based on Mr. Gardiner)
- Shikha Dewan as Mrs. Kumar (character based on Mrs. Gardiner)
- Dharmesh Tiwari as Major Sahab (character based on Colonel Fitzwilliam)
- Abhimanyu Sharma as Sir Ishwar Mehta (character based on the late Mr. Darcy)
