= Sudha Malhotra =

Indian playback singer

- Born: 30 November 1936 (age 89); New Delhi, India
- Genres: Playback
- Occupations: Singer
- Years active: 1954–1982
- Spouse: Girdhar Motwani
- Awards: Padma Shri

Sudha Malhotra (born 30 November 1936) is an Indian playback singer. She also acted in some Bollywood films and as a playback singer, worked in popular Bollywood movies in the 1950s and 1960s, like Arzoo, Babar, Dhool Ka Phool, Ab Dilli Door Nahin, Girlfriend, Barsat Ki Rat, Didi and Dekh Kabira Roya. She was last heard in Raj Kapoor's Prem Rog (1982) in the song "Yeh Pyar Tha Ya Kuch Aur Tha". Apart from Hindi songs, she sang many popular Marathi songs (Bhavgeet) with Arun Date.

She was awarded the Padma Shri by Government of India in 2013.

== Early life and education ==
Sudha Malhotra was born in New Delhi to a Punjabi Hindu family and grew up in Lahore, Bhopal and Firozpur. She is the eldest of 4 siblings - Arun, Vijay, Kiran and herself. She did her graduation in music from Agra University.

== Career ==
Malhotra was discovered as a child artist by Ghulam Haider (a prominent music director of the 1940s). She debuted in the movie Arzoo. She retired from film industry in 1960, following her marriage with businessman Giridhar Motwani (whose family owned the Chicago Radio Mike Company). She recorded for a few albums in the following years, including for Jagjit Singh's In a Mood of Love. She also sang for Raj Kapoor's Prem Rog in 1982.

Some of her popular Marathi songs are (Bhavgeet) - "Shukratara Mandwara", " Visarasheel Khas Mala", "Haat Tuza Haataat" and "Divas Tujhe he Fulayche", all duets with Arun Date. She has sung 264 songs in 155 films.

== Personal life ==
Malhotra married Giridhar Motwani, whose family owned the Chicago Radio. After her marriage, photographs of her with the lyricist Sahir Ludhianvi were published in the Blitz magazine. She repeatedly denied their relationship, and later, Blitz released an apology. It is believed that Ludhianvi wrote the song Chalo Ek Baar Phir Se when Malhotra's marriage was finalised.

== Filmography ==
- Arzoo (1950)
- Dil-E-Naadan (1953)
- Ab Dilli Door Nahin (1957)
- Dekh Kabira Roya (1957)
- Raj Tilak (1958)
- Parvarish (1958)
- Dhool Ka Phool (1959)
- Didi (1959)
- Girlfriend (1960)
- Barsat Ki Raat (1960)
- Babar (1960)
- Gauhar
- Prem Rog (1982)
