= Swarna Trisha =

1989 Indian Hindi film

- Poster
- Directed by: Mangal Chakraborty
- Produced by: Vishwanath Ghosh
- Starring: Mithun Chakraborty; Yogeeta Bali; Pradeep Kumar; Prem Chopra
- Music by: Salil Chowdhury
- Release date: 26 May 1989
- Running time: 135 minutes
- Country: India
- Language: Hindi

Swarna Trisha (transl. Final Revenge) is a 1989 Indian Bengali-language crime action thriller film directed by Mangal Chakraborty. It stars Mithun Chakraborty in lead role, along with Yogeeta Bali, Pradeep Kumar, Prem Chopra in supporting roles. Aakhri Badla is also dubbed in Hindi as Aakhri Badla, released in 1990.

== Summary ==
Kama Kazi is an international smuggling gang. When the Interpol is about to raid the gang, they moves all their wealth in the form of gold and silver diamonds by ship, but the ship sinks into a cyclone. An Indian company is subcontracted to salvage the sunken ship, and the Indian Intelligence sends its ace agent Himadri Choudhari, and his sidekick Mantu Ghosh along with a Japanese karate master Kitahara.

== Cast ==
- Mithun Chakraborty as Himadri Chaudhary
- Yogeeta Bali as Leena Saigal
- Pradeep Kumar as Preetam Saigal
- Prem Chopra
- Abhi Bhattacharya as Kama Kazi / Dr. Sen

== Soundtrack ==
Lyrics: Yogesh

1. "Mann Kare Yaad Woh Din" – Kishore Kumar
2. "O Mere Saathi Re" – Kishore Kumar, Lata Mangeshkar
3. "Jaane Kaisa Jaadoo Yeh Chal Gaya" – Asha Bhosle
4. "Furusato wa doko desuka" – Teresa Teng
