= Prafulla Desai =

Indian surgical oncologist

- Born: Maharashtra, India
- Occupations: Oncologist; Medical academic Medical administrator
- Known for: Surgical oncology
- Spouse: Meena Desai
- Awards: Padma Bhushan; Dhanwanthari Award; Wockhardt Medical Excellence Award; Mucio Athayde International Cancer Award; ICC Lifetime achievement Award; Karmayogi Puraskar

Prafulla B. Ragubhai Desai is an Indian surgical oncologist and a former chairman of the Research Advisory Committee on Oncology of the Indian Council of Medical Research. He is credited with the first bone marrow transplantation in India, which he performed with his team in 1983. He is a former director and superintendent at Tata Memorial Centre, Mumbai (1973–1995) and continues his association with the institution as their professor emeritus. He is one of the founders of the Rural Cancer Centre established by Tata Memorial Centre at Barshi, Mumbai and serves Breach Candy Hospital as a surgical oncologist and the Indo-Global Summit on Head and Neck Oncology (IGSHNO) as a member of their national faculty.

Roy is a recipient of the Wockhardt Medical Excellence Award (2003) of the Harvard Medical International, Dhanwanthari Award of the Dhanwanthari Foundation, and Lifetime Achievement Award (2016) of the International Congress on Cancer, the Mucio Athayde International Cancer Award (1998) of the International Union Against Cancer and the Karmayogi Puraskar of the Bombay Medical Aid Foundation. Married to Meena, a medical doctor, he is associated with Care India Medical Society, a charitable organization involved in community service related to oncology, and participates in social initiatives on cancer. The Government of India awarded him the third highest civilian honour of the Padma Bhushan, in 1981, for his contributions to medical science.
