= Anita Guha =

Indian actress (1932 - 2007)

- Born: 17 January 1939
- Died: 20 June 2007 (aged 68)
- Occupation: Actress
- Years active: 1953–1989
- Spouse: Manik Dutt

Anita Guha (17 January 1939 – 20 June 2007) was an Indian actress who usually played mythological characters in films. She became known for playing the title role in Jai Santoshi Maa (1975). Previously, she had played Sita in other mythological films; Sampoorna Ramayana (1961), Shree Ram Bharat Milap (1965) and Tulsi Vivah (1971). Besides this, she also played notable roles in films such as Goonj Uthi Shehnai (1959), Purnima (1965), Pyar Ki Rahen (1959), Gateway of India (1957), Dekh Kabira Roya (1957), Lukochuri (1958) and Sanjog (1961). She also was the lead actress in the landmark Rajasthani film Baba Ramdev.

== Career ==
She came to Mumbai in the 1950s as a beauty pageant contestant when she was 15 years old. She became an actress there and made her film debut in Tonga-wali (1955). She moved on to hit films such as Dekh Kabira Roya (1957), Sharada (1957), and Goonj Uthi Shehnai, for which she earned nomination in Filmfare Award for Best Supporting Actress category, the only nomination of her career. In 1961, she appeared as Sita, in Babubhai Mistry's Sampoorna Ramayana, which made her a household name.

But it was her title role in Jai Santoshi Maa (1975) that brought her the most fame. She had never even heard of goddess Santoshi until she was offered the role, as this was a little-known goddess. It was only a guest appearance, and her scenes were shot in 10–12 days. She fasted during the shooting. The low-budget pic was a surprise hit, and broke box office records while becoming a cultural phenomenon. The goddess Santoshi now became a famous goddess, and women all over India worshipped her. People treated the movie theatres showing Jai Santoshi Maa as a temple, bringing offerings of food, leaving slippers at the door. Guha claimed that people came to her asking her to bless them, as they perceived her to be a real goddess. However, she never became a devotee of the goddess herself, claiming that she was a devotee of the goddess Kali.

Other mythological films she acted in include Kavi Kalidas (1959), Jai Dwarkadesh (1977) and Krishna Krishna (1986). She wasn't happy that she became typecast as a mythological actress, because acting offers eventually stopped coming her way. Her earlier credits include period films such as Sangeet Samrat Tansen (1962), Kan Kan Mein Bhagwan (1963) and Veer Bhimsen (1964). She played Rajesh Khanna's adoptive mother in the huge hit Aradhana (1969).

== Personal life ==
She was married to actor Manik Dutt; they had no biological children. They adopted a girl child later. After her husband's death, she lived alone in Mumbai where she died of cardiac failure on 20 June 2007. Anita Guha is the maternal aunt of actor Prema Narayan. Prema is the daughter of her sister Anuradha Guha.

== Filmography ==
Year	Title	Role	Notes
1953	Bansher Kella		
1955	Tonga-wali		Debut
1955	Duniya Gol Hai	Devi Diya Kumari	
1956	Yahudi Ki Beti		
1956	Ankh Ka Nasha	Asha Devi	
1956	Chirakumar Sabha		
1956	Chhoo Mantar	Ratnavali	
1957	Harjit		
1957	Ustad	Mrs Rosy	
1957	Sharada	Padma	
1957	Pawan Putra Hanuman		
1957	Gateway of India	Kishore's Girlfriend	
1957	Ek Jhalak		
1957	Dekh Kabira Roya	Rekha	
1958	Kal Kya Hoga		
1958	Lukochuri		
1958	Stand		
1958	Mayabazar	Surekha	
1958	Farishta	Bagga's Daughter	
1958	Bhala Aadmi		
1959	Tipu Sultan		
1959	Samrat Prithviraj Chauhan	Karnataki	Raj Nartaki
1959	Maharani Padmini		
1959	Pyar Ki Rahen		
1959	Kavi Kalidas	Pushpavali	
1959	Goonj Uthi Shehnai	Ramkali	Nominated for Filmfare Award for Best Supporting Actress
1959	Chacha Zindabad	Renu	
1960	Rikshawala		
1960	Mud Mud Ke Na Dekh	Anita Singh	
1960	Angulimaal	Guru Mata	
1961	Sanjog	Laali	
1961	Sampoorna Ramayana	Seeta	
1962	Sangeet Samrat Tansen	Hansa	Love interest of Tansen
1963	Naag Jyoti		
1963	Kan Kan Men Bhagwan	Roopa	
1963	Dev Kanya		
1964	Veer Bhimsen		
1964	Roop Sundari		
1964	Mahasati Anusuya		
1965	Shahi Raqasa		
1965	Sant Tukaram		
1965	Shree Ram Bharat Milan	Sita	
1965	Shankar Sita Ansuya	Sita	
1965	Sati Nari	Rajkumari Malavati	
1965	Purnima	Vandana Mehra	
1965	Maharaja Vikram		
1965	Jahan Sati Wahan Bhagwan	Mandakini / Gandharv Kanya	
1966	Lab Kush		
1969	Hanuman Chalisa		
1969	Aradhana	Foster mother of Suraj	Credited as Anita Dutt
1969	Sati Sulochana	Naagkumari Sulochana	
1971	Tulsi Vivah	Goddess Lakshmi	
1972	Anuraag	Rajesh's mother	
1973	Jhoom Utha Akash		
1973	Gharibi Hatao		
1974	Jab Andhera Hota Hai	Mrs. Manorama Bhardwaj	
1975	Mahapavan Teerth Yatra		
1975	Jai Santoshi Maa	Goddess Santoshi	Popular & Memorable role
1975	Biwi Kiraya Ki		
1975	Badnaam		
1976	Ladki Bholi Bhali	Raju's Mother	
1976	Nagin	Sunita's Sister	
1976	Jai Mahalaxmi Maa		
1976	Do Khiladi	Mamta Singh	
1977	Anand Ashram	Chandramukhi	
1977	Solah Shukrawar	Kaushalya	
1977	Jai Dwarkadheesh	Revati	
1977	Jai Ambe Maa		
1978	Tumhare Liye	Sheela devi	
1979	Guru Ho Jaa Shuru	Sheela's mom	
1981	Sampoorna Santoshi Maa Ki Mahima		
1981	Fiffty Fiffty	Ranimaa	
1983	Navaratri		
1983	Sati Naag Kanya	Sati Anasuya	
1984	Prarthana		
1986	Krishna-Krishna	Revati	
1989	Socha Na Tha		
1991	Lakhpati	Rambha	(final film role)

== Awards and nominations ==
- 1960: Filmfare Award
  - Filmfare Award for Best Supporting Actress: Goonj Uthi Shehnai: Nominated
