= Raj Mehra =

Indian actor (1913-1993)

- Born: 20 May 1913
- Died: 10 April 1993 (aged 79)
- Occupation: Actor
- Years active: 1948 – 1986

Raj Mehra (born 20 May 1913 – 10 April 1993) was an Indian character artist and film actor in Hindi language films, especially known for his role as a father of leading actors. During his career, he worked in over 300 Hindi films. Some of his popular roles are those of the father of Raj Kapoor in Sharada and Police Superintendent in Jis Desh Men Ganga Behti Hai.

== Career ==
He started his career with Shaheed Latif's Shikayat (1948). Aasoo Bane Angaarey (1993) was his last film he acted in.

== Filmography ==
Year	Title	Role	Notes
1948	Shikayat		
1948	Pyaar Ki Jeet		Supporting actor
1948	Aaj Ki Raat		
1949	Naach		
1949	Patanga	Gope's Chowkidar	
1950	Kamal Ke Phool		
1951	Stage		
1951	Saiyan	Thakor Sahib	
1951	Khazana		
1952	Parbat		
1952	Anand Math	Narrator	
1957	Sharada	Kashiram	
1957	Gateway of India		
1958	Police		
1960	Jis Desh Men Ganga Behti Hai	Police Superintendent	
1961	Jab Pyar Kisise Hota Hai	Khanna	
1964	Woh Kaun Thi?	S.P.	
1964	Ziddi	Thakur Mahendra Singh.	
1965	Neela Aakash	Neela's Father	
1966	Aaye Din Bahar Ke	Jankidas	
1966	Teesri Manzil	Sunita's Father	
1967	Patthar Ke Sanam	Shyamlal	
1969	Sajan	Inspector Khan	
1969	Pyar Hi Pyar	Kailash Nath Gupta	
1971	Aap Aye Bahaar Ayee	Bakshi	
1972	Shor	Doctor	
1972	Be-Imaan	Seth Jamna Das	
1973	Raja Rani	Goverdhan Das	
1973	Loafer	Rajendranath Mehra	
1973	Jugnu	Inspector General	
1974	Amir Garib	Police Commissioner	
1977	Shirdi Ke Sai Baba	Murthy	
1980	Beqasoor (1980 film)	Public Prosecutor	Guest Role
1980	Be-Reham	Police Commissioner Gupte	Guest Role
1983	Divorce (1983 film)		
1983	Paanchwin Manzil	Police Commissnor Ghanekar	
1986	Aap Ke Saath	Doctor	Guest Role
1986	Tan-Badan	Thakur Shamsher Singh	
1989	Daata		

== Awards ==
Filmfare Awards 1958

Category	Film	Result
Best Supporting actor	Sharada	Won
