= Nazir Hussain =

Indian film actor

Nazir Hussain Khan
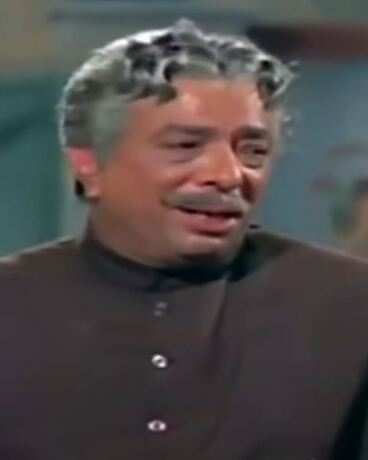
- Born: 15 May 1922; Usia, United Provinces, British India (present-day Uttar Pradesh, India)
- Died: 16 October 1987 (aged 65); Bombay, Maharashtra, India
- Occupations: Actor; Film director Film producer Screenwriter
- Years active: 1953–1984
- Works: Filmography

Nazir Hussain (15 May 1922 – 16 October 1987) was an Indian actor, director and screenwriter.

He was famous as a character actor in Hindi cinema and was a pioneer of Bhojpuri cinema. He acted in almost 500 films, most of which were with Dev Anand.

== Early life ==
Nazir Hussain was born on 15 May 1922 in a small village of Ghazipur district, Uttar Pradesh, British India. Nazir Hussain's father Shahabzad Khan was a guard in the Indian Railways and Hussain grew up in Lucknow. He himself worked as a fireman in the railways for few months and soon joined the British army during World War II. He was posted in Malaysia and Singapore where he became a prisoner of war. After being freed, he came under the influence of Subhas Chandra Bose and joined the Indian National Army (INA). He was accorded the status of freedom fighter and was given a free railway pass for life.

== Film career ==
After the INA service, unable to find jobs, he began performing in plays. B. N. Sircar of New Theatres, impressed by his performance, called him to Calcutta to join New Theatres. In Calcutta, he met Bimal Roy and became his assistant. He joined with Bimal Roy to make the film Pahela Aadmi, based on the INA experience. He not only acted in the film, but also wrote the story and co-wrote the dialogues for the film. Pehla Aadmi was released in 1950 and launched him to stardom and he became a permanent fixture in Bimal Roy's movies. Later, he worked in many socialist themed films such as Do Bigha Zamin, Devdas and Naya Daur.

== Bhojpuri cinema ==
Hussain discussed the possibility of a Bhojpuri cinema industry with Indian president Rajendra Prasad. He is considered as the father of Bhojpuri cinema. Hussain created Ganga Maiyya Tohe Piyari Chadhaibo (1963), the first Bhojpuri film. Nazir turned producer with Bhojpuri film Hamaar Sansar and also directed it. Hussain was also known for the hit Bhojpuri film Balam Pardesia in the late 1970s.

== Associations ==
Nazir worked with several eminent actors and actresses of Hindi cinema.
