= List of Hindi films of 1954 =

A list of films produced by the Bollywood film industry based in Mumbai in 1954. Boot Polish produced by Raj Kapoor went on to win the Filmfare Best Movie Award in 1955.

Mirza Ghalib, a film based on the life of well-known poet Mirza Ghalib, directed by Sohrab Modi and starring Bharat Bhushan and Suraiya went on to win the Golden Lotus Award for National Film Award for Best Feature Film in 1955.

Jagriti, directed by Satyen Bose went on to win the Filmfare Best Movie Award in 1956.

== Highest-grossing films ==
The ten highest-grossing films at the Indian box office in 1954:

Rank	Title	Gross collection
1	Nagin	₹2.90 crore
2	Nastik	₹2.35 crore
3	Taxi Driver	₹1.90 crore
4	Mirza Ghalib	₹1.70 crore
5	Aar Paar	₹1.60 crore
6	Jagriti	₹1.35 crore
7	Shart	₹1.15 crore
8	Boot Polish	₹95 lakh
9	Amar	₹75 lakh
10	Adhikar	₹65 lakh

== A-C ==
Title	Director	Cast	Genre	Music
Aar Paar	Guru Dutt	Guru Dutt, Shyama, Johnny Walker, Jagdish Sethi, Jagdeep, Tun Tun, Bir Sakuja	Romance Drama	Music: O. P. Nayyar Lyrics: Majrooh Sultanpuri
Adhikar	Mohan Sehgal	Usha Kiran, Kishore Kumar, Radhakrishan, Yashodara Katju, Balam, Roopmati	Family Drama	Music: Avinash Vyas Lyrics: Prem Dhawan
Afreeka	K. Kant.	Baburao Pehalwan, Krishna Kumari, Habib, Ishwar, R.S. Pawar, Madan Kapoor, Sheikh, D.N. Devesh, Parmesh, Kumar Sharma.	Action /Adventure	Music Director: Robin Lyricist: Kumar Sharma Banvasi
Alibaba Aur 40 Chor	Homi Wadia	Mahipal, Shakila, B. M. Vyas, S. N. Tripathi, Sharada, Maruti Rao, Lalitha Kumari, Shalini	Fantasy	Music: S. N. Tripathi, Chitragupta Lyrics: Raja Mehdi Ali Khan
Amar	Mehboob Khan	Dilip Kumar, Madhubala, Nimmi, Jayant, Ulhas, Mukri, Murad	Social Drama	Music: Naushad Lyrics: Shakeel Badayuni
Amar Kirtan	K. C. Pandit	Shahu Modak, Ameeta, Madan Puri, Kumkum, Jayant, Chand Burke, Maya Dass	Devotional	Music: S. D. Batish Lyrics: Wali Sahab
Ameer	Chandu	Geeta Bali, Kamal Kapoor, Tiwari, Manju, Basant Rao, Panna Lal	Action	Music: Lachhiram Tamar Lyrics: Asad Bhopali, Pyarelal Santoshi, Uddhav Kumar
Angarey		Nargis, Nasir Khan, Pran, Rattan Kumar, Jeevan, K. N. Singh, Gajanan Jagirdar, Baby Nanda, Paro Devi,	Costume Drama	Music: S. D. Burman Lyrics: Sahir Ludhianvi
Aulad	Mohan Sehgal	Nirupa Roy, Balraj Sahni, Usha Kiran, Radhakrishan, Haroon	Family Drama	Music: Sardar Malik Lyrics: Prem Dhawan, Raja Mehdi Ali Khan, Vishwamitra Adil
Aurat Teri Yehi Kahani	Chaturbhuj Doshi	Nirupa Roy, Bharat Bhushan, Chandrashekhar, Sulochana	Drama	Music: Bulo C. Rani Lyrics: Saraswati Kumar Deepak, D. N. Madhok,
Baadbaan	Phani Majumdar	Ashok Kumar, Meena Kumari, Dev Anand, Usha Kiran, P. Jairaj, Sheikh Mukhtar, Leela Chitnis, Mehmood	Social Drama	Filmfare Best Supporting Actress Award - Usha Kiran. Music: Timir Baran, S. K. Pal Lyrics: Indeevar
Baap Beti	Bimal Roy	Nalini Jaywant, Ranjan, Nazir Hussain, Tabassum, Nazima, Sunalini Devi, Asha Parekh	Family	Music: Roshan Lyrics: Kavi Pradeep
Badshah	Amiya Chakraborty	Pradeep Kumar, Usha Kiran, Mala Sinha, K. N. Singh, Agha, Achala Sachdev, Ulhas	Action Drama	Music: Shankar Jaikishan Lyrics: Hasrat Jaipuri, Shailendra
Bahut Din Huwe	S. S. Vasan	Madhubala, Agha, Lalita Pawar, Kanhaiyalal, Master Rattan Kumar, M. K. Radha, Gulab, Pushpavalli	Costume Drama	Music: B. S. Kalla
Barati	J. K. Nanda	Chand Usmani, Agha, Peace Kanwal, Johnny Walker, Om Prakash, Leela Mishra, Agha Miraz, Shyam Kumar	Family Drama	Music: Roshan Lyrics: Raja Mehdi Ali Khan, D. N. Madhok, Jan Nisar Akhtar, Tanveer Naqvi
Bazooband	Ramanand Sagar	Balraj Sahni, Sulochana Chatterjee, Om Prakash, Radhakrishan, Anwar Hussain, Roopmala, Ramesh Kumar	Social	Music: Mohammed Shafi Lyrics: Prem Dhawan, Daag, Chandrashekhar
Betab	Harbans	Ashok Kumar, Kamal, Kumar, Motilal, Murad	Social	Music: S. D. Batish Lyrics: Kaif Irfani, Roop Bani, Shevan Rizvi
Bhai Sahab	Ravindra Dave	C. H. Atma, Smriti Biswas, Purnima, Rattan Kumar, Jagdeep	Social	Music: Neenu Majumdar Lyrics: Shailendra
Bilwamangal	D. N. Madhok	Suraiya, C. H. Atma, Asha Mathur, Ulhas, Nirupa Roy	Devotional	Music: Bulo C. Rani Lyrics: D. N. Madhok
Biraj Bahu	Bimal Roy	Kamini Kaushal, Abhi Bhattacharya, Pran, Manorama, Shakuntala, Randhir, Nazima, Iftekhar, Moni Chatterjee, Kammo	Family Drama	Filmfare Awards for best direction- Bimal Roy, best actress- Kamini Kaushal, Certificate of Merit for Best Feature Film. Music: Salil Chowdhary Lyrics: Prem Dhawan
Bokul	Bholanath Mitra	Uttam Kumar, Tulsi Chakraborty, Basanta Choudhury, Master Qamar, Arundhati Mukherjee, Manorama	Social	Music: Pronob Dey Lyrics: Pandit Bhushan
Boot Polish	Prakash Arora	David, Master Rattan, Baby Naaz, Chand Burke, Bhudo Advani, Veera	Social	Filmfare Awards for Best Film - Raj Kapoor, Best Supporting Actor - David, Best Cinematographer - Tara Dutt. Music: Shankar Jaikishan Lyrics: Shailendra, Saraswati Kumar Deepak, Hasrat Jaipuri
Chakradhari	Raman B. Desai	Nirupa Roy, Shahu Modak, Trilok Kapoor, Yashodara Katju, Maya Dass, Ram Avtar, Rooplaxmi	Devotional	Music: Avinash Vyas Lyrics: Kavi Pradeep
Chandni Chowk	B. R. Chopra	Meena Kumari, Shekhar, Smriti Biswas, Jeevan, Agha, Yashodara Katju, Kumar, Achala Sachdev, Sunder		Music: Roshan Lyrics: Majrooh Sultanpuri, Raja Mehdi Ali Khan, Shailendra
Chitrangada	Hem Chander	Utpal Dutt, Jiban Ganguly, Mala Sinha, Samir, Namita Sengupta	Costume	Music: Pankaj Mullick
Chor Bazar	P. N. Arora	Shammi Kapoor, Chitra, Sumitra Devi, Om Prakash, Amar, Cuckoo, Ram Avtar, Jagdish Kanwal, W. M. Khan, Parshuram	Costume Drama	Music: Sardar Malik Lyrics: Shakeel Badayuni

== D-L ==
Title	Director	Cast	Genre	Music
Dak Babu	Lekhraj Bhakri	Talat Mehmood, Nadira, Radhakrishan, Kuldip Kaur, Yashodara Katju, Manmohan Krishna	Social	Music: Dhaniram Lyrics: Prem Dhawan, Raja Mehdi Ali Khan, Dhaniram
Daku Ki Ladki	Tara Harish	Geeta Bali, Sheikh Mukhtar, Mukri, Shivraj, Cuckoo, Sankatha Prasad	Action	Music: Hemant Kumar Lyrics: Kaif Irfani, S. H. Bihari, Indeevar
Danka	J. P. Advani	Nimmi, Amarnath, Om Prakash, Sunder, Mohana, Hiralal, Neelam Kothari, Shivraj, Uma Devi, Roop Kumar	Costume	Music: Aziz Hindi Lyrics: Jan Nisar Akhtar, Nazim Panipati, Arshi Ajmeri
Darwaza	Shahid Lateef	Shekhar, Shyama, Nazir Hussain, Indrajeet, Leela Mishra, Pratima Devi, Amir Banu	Social Drama	Music: Naushad Lyrics: Majrooh Sultanpuri, Khumar Barabankvi, Vishwamitra Adil
Dhobi Doctor	Phani Majumdar	Kishore Kumar, Nazira, Kanhaiyalal, Shivraj, Krishnakant, Usha Rani, Jagdeep, Mehmood	Social	Music: Khayyaam Lyrics: Majrooh Sultanpuri, Ali Sardar Jafri
Dhoop Chhaon	S M Raza	Shyama, Bharat Bhushan, Krishna Kumari, N. A. Ansari, Mumtaz, Shamim Akhtar		Music: Aziz Hindi Lyrics: Jan Nisar Akhtar, Khawar Zaman, Arshi Ajmeri
Dost	Rajendra Sharma	Suresh, Usha Kiran, Om Prakash, Kammo, Khairati, Mohna, Majnu, Ramesh Thakur, Randhir, S. Nazir and Uma Dutt	Social	Music: Hansraj Behl Lyrics: Varma Malik
Durga Puja	Dhirubhai Desai	Nirupa Roy, Trilok Kapoor, Shahu Modak, Kamal, Ratnamala, S. N. Tripathi	Devotional	Music: S. N. Tripathi Lyrics: Bharat Vyas, B. D. Mishra, Gopal Singh Nepali, Saraswati Kumar Deepak
Ehsan	Rajendra Sharma	Shammi Kapoor, Munawwar Sultana, Prithviraj Kapoor, Gulab, Naaz, K. N. Singh, Roopmala	Social	Music: Madan Mohan Lyrics: D. N. Madhok, Kaif Irfani
Fuji-Lama	H. S. Tharani	Rajan Haksar, Manorama, Shanta Kanwar, Habib	Fantasy	Music: J. Majumdar
Gawaiya	H. P. Sharma	Surendra, Sulochana Chatterji, Sunder, Kumkum, Vijayalaxmi, Sapru, Heera Sawant	Social	Music: Ram Ganguly Lyrics: S. H. Bihari, Chandra Shekhar Pandey, Shewan Rizvi
Gul Bahar	Nanubhai Vakil	Shakila, Hemant, Kuldip Kaur, Ram Avtar, Kumar, Randhir, Chand Burke, Tun Tun, Khairati	Costume	Music: Dhaniram, Khayyam Lyrics: Asad Bhopali, Jan Nisar Akhtar
Guzaara	S. M. Yusuf	Karan Dewan, Jabeen, Paro Devi, Naaz, S. M. Yusuf	Social Drama	Music: Ghulam Mohammad Lyrics: Raja Mehdi Ali Khan, Fauk Jaami, Munir Lakhnavi,
Haar Jeet	Jaggi Rampal	Suresh, Shyama, Hiralal, Madan Puri, Sunder, Manorama	Social	Music: S. D. Batish Lyrics: Shewan Rizvi, Saraswati Kumar Deepak, Kaif Irfani, Aziz Kashmiri
Hukumat	Raja Yagnik	Manhar Desai, Nirupa Roy, Kuldip Kaur, Shammi, Anwar Hussain, Noorjahan	Costume Action	Music: Avinash Vyas
Halla Gulla	Bhagwan	Shakila, Bhagwan, Sajjan, Baburao Pendharkar, Leela Gupte, Leela Gandhi	Action	Music: Nisar Lyrics: Saba Afghani
Hamlet	Kishore Sahu	Kishore Sahu, Mala Sinha, Kamaljeet, Jankidas, S. Nazir, Shreenath, Hiralal, Paul Sharma, Venus Banerjee	Costume Drama	Music: Ramesh Naidu Lyrics: Hasrat Jaipuri
Hanuman Janma	Raja Nene	Prem Adib, Ranjana, Paro Devi, Jugnu	Religious	Music: Hansraj Behl Lyrics: S. P. Kalla
Ilzaam	R. C. Talwar	Kishore Kumar, Meena Kumari, Jagdish Sethi, Shammi, Amar, Randhir, Meera Devi	Social Drama	Music: Madan Mohan Lyrics: Rajendra Krishan
Jadugar	Mohamed Hussain	Kamran, Niroo, Shaikh, Habib, Lalita Kumari, Amrit Rana	Fantasy	Music: Iqbal Lyrics: Faruk Kaiser
Jagriti	Satyen Bose	Abhi Bhattacharya, Bipin Gupta, Pranoti Ghosh, Rajkumar Gupta, Mumtaz Begum, Rattan Kumar	Social	Filmfare Award for Best Movie. National Film Award for Best Feature Film in Hindi - Certificate of Merit. Music: Hemant Kumar Lyrics: Kavi Pradeep
Kalakar	Anant Mane	Sheila Ramani, Agha, Vivek, Neeru, Dhumal, Raja Nene, Suner, Heera Sawant, Raja Gosavi		Music: Vasant Desai Lyrics: Sarshar Sailani, K. Razdan
Kashti	Hemen Gupta	Dev Anand, Geeta Bali, Chand Burke, Ram Singh, Jagdish Kanwal, Jankidas, Narmada Shankar		Music: Hemant Kumar
Kasturi	Vrajendra Gaur	Nimmi, Sajjan, Bipin Gupta, Anand Prasad, Alka, Samson	Social	Music: Pankaj Mullick, Jamal Sen Lyrics: Vrajendra Gaur
Kavi	Debaki Bose	Nalini Jaywant, Geeta Bali, Bharat Bhushan, Chandrashekhar, Om Prakash, B. M. Vyas, Jankidas, H. Prakash	Social Drama	Music: C. Ramachandra Lyrics: Rajendra Krishan
Khaibar	Kedar Kapoor	Kamal Kapoor, Nigar Sultana, Tiwari, Naaz, Niranjan Sharma, B. M. Vyas, Chaman Puri	Costume	Music: Hansraj Behl Lyrics: Asad Bhopali
Khushboo	Rana Indu Shamsher	Motilal, Shyama, Shakila, Moti Sagar, Kesari, Noor, Radheshyam	Social	Music: Shankar Lal Lyrics: Gopal Singh Nepali
Laadla	Suryakumar	Shyama, Karan Dewan, Agha, Krishna Kumari, Jeevan, Maruti Pehalwan, Raj Mehra	Social	Music: Vinod Lyrics: Raja Mehdi Ali Khan
Laila	Naseem Siddiqui	Daljeet, Shakila, Durga Khote, Hiralal, Noorjahan, Kammo, W. M. Khan	Costume	Music: A. R. Qureshi Lyrics: Bharat Vyas, Kaif Irfani, Shewan Rizvi, Mulkraj Bhakri, Munshi Dil
Lakeeren	Harbans	Ashok Kumar, Nalini Jaywant, Pran, Yakub, Durga Khote, Tiwari, Cuckoo, Sulochana Chatterjee, Sulochana, Kamal	Social Drama	Music: Hafeez Khan Lyrics: Shewan Rizvi
Lal Pari	Kedar Kapoor	Mahipal, Shakila, Johnny Walker, Kuldip Kaur, Tiwari, Helen, B. M. Vyas, Maruti	Fantasy	Music: Hansraj Behl Lyrics: Asad Bhopali

== M-R ==
Title	Director	Cast	Genre	Music
Maan	Safdar Aah	Ajit, Chitra, Gajanan Jagirdar, Yashodhara Katju, Kumar Kamlesh Kumari	Costume	Music: Anil Biswas Lyrics: Safdar Aah, Asad Bhopali, Raja Mehdi Ali Khan
Mahatma Kabir a. k. a. Great Soul Kabir	Gajanan Jagirdar	Surendra, Sulochana Chatterjee, Gajanan Jagirdar, Anant Marathe, Amirbai Karnataki, Shashi Kapoor, Naina, Ratnamala	Devotional	Music: Anil Biswas Lyrics: Chandra Shekhar Pandey, Kabir, Narendra Sharma, Izhar Malihabadi, Ehsan
Majboori	Ram Daryani	Balraj Sahni, Shyama, Jeevan, Kumar, Gope, Gulab, Pramila	Social Drama	Music: Robin Chatterjee Lyrics: D. N. Madhok, P Gaafil
Malka-e-Alam Noorjehan	Gunjal	Pradeep Kumar, Asha Mathur, Kamal Kapoor, Gajanan Jagirdar, Jankidas, Rajan Kapoor	Historical Drama	Music: Avinash Vyas Lyrics: Keshav Trivedi, Ramesh Gupta, Pyarelal Santoshi
Mangu	N. A. Ansari	Sheikh Mukhtar, Nigar Sultana, Sheila Ramani, Mukri, N. A. Ansari, Nazir Kashmiri	Action Drama	Music: Mohammed Shafi, O. P. Nayyar Lyrics: Majrooh Sultanpuri
Manohar	L. V. Prasad	Sivaji Ganeshan, T. R. Rajakumari, P. Kannamba, Girija, Sadashiv Rao Kavi, Javar Sitaram	Costume Drama	Music: S. V. Venkatraman, T. R. Ramanathan Lyrics: Vishwamitra Adil
Mastana	H. S. Rawail	Motilal, Nigar Sultana, Chandrashekhar, Kuldip Kaur, Yashodhara Katju, Sunder, Gope, Chaman Puri, Master Romi, Tiwari	Social	Music: Madan Mohan Lyrics: Rajendra Krishan
Mayurpankh	Kishore Sahu	Bina Rai, Kishore Sahu, Reginald Jackson, Odette Ferguson, Sumitra Devi, Asha Mathur, Ramesh Gupta, Jankidas, Seema, Cuckoo, Moni Chatterji, Helen	Romantic Drama	Music: Shankar Jaikishan Lyrics: Hasrat Jaipuri, Shailendra
Meenar	Hemen Gupta	Bina Rai, Bharat Bhushan, Sheila Ramani, Chandrashekhar, Pran, S. Nazir, Pratima Devi	Social	Music: C. Ramchandra Lyrics: Rajendra Krishan
Mehbooba	K. Amarnath	Shammi Kapoor, Nalini Jaywant, Gope, Achala Sachdev, W. M. Khan, Hiralal	Costume Drama	Music: Roshan, O. P. Nayyar Lyrics: Majrooh Sultanpuri, Tanveer Naqvi, Indeevar
Mirza Ghalib	Sohrab Modi	Bharat Bhushan, Suraiya, Nigar Sultana, Murad, Durga Khote, Jagdish Sethi, Mukri, Kumkum, Sadat Ali, Iftekhar	Biopic Musical	Music: Ghulam Mohammed Lyrics: Mirza Ghalib, Shakeel Badayuni
Miss Mala	Jayant Desai	Kishore Kumar, Vyjayanthimala, Jeevan, Bipin Gupta, Agha, Samson, Umakant	Social	Music: Chitragupta Lyrics: Raja Mehdi Ali Khan, Anjum Jaipuri
Munna	K. A. Abbas	Sulochana Chatterji, P. Jairaj, Achala Sachdev, Tripti Mitra, Manmohan Krishna, Bhudo Advani, Madan Puri, Om Prakash, Johnny Walker, Rashid Khan, Jagdeep, David, Master Romi, Shammi, Naaz	Social Children	Music: Anil Biswas
Naaz	S K Ojha	Ashok Kumar, Nalini Jaywant, Veena, Nawab, Murad, Tiwari, S. Nazir, Amar, K. Sabir	Social	Music: Anil Biswas Lyrics: Prem Dhawan, Kedar Sharma, Satyendra Athaiya
Nagin	Nandlal Jaswantlal	Pradeep Kumar, Vyjayanthimala, Krishna Kumari, I. S. Johar, Jeevan, Sulochana, Mubarak, Ram Avtar	Fantasy Musical	Music: Hemant Kumar Lyrics: Rajendra Krishan
Nastik	I. S. Johar	Ajit, Nalini Jaywant, I. S. Johar, Raj Mehra, Leela Mishra, Ulhas, Mumtaz Begum, Roopmala	Social	Music: C. Ramchandra Lyrics: Kavi Pradeep
Naukari	Bimal Roy	Kishore Kumar, Sheila Ramani, Moni Chatterjee, Kanhaiyalal, Noor, Achala Sachdev, Bikram Kapoor, Samson, Krishnakant, Iftekhar, Jagdeep, Mehmood, Sailen Bose	Social	Music: Salil Choudhry Lyrics: Shailendra
Noor Mahal	Nanubhai Vakil	Daljeet, Shakila, Kumkum, Kamal, Jagdish Kanwal, W. M. Khan	Fantasy	Music: A. R. Qureshi Lyrics: Munshi Dil
Paheli Tarikh	Raja Nene	Nirupa Roy, Raja Nene, Agha, Yashodara Katju, Sudha, Ramesh Kapoor, V. Pahelwan	Social Drama	Music: Sudhir Phadke Lyrics: Qamar Jalalabadi
Pamposh	Ezra Mir	Shashikala, Leela Kanade, Mogli, B. Billimoria Siddiqui, Chella	Social	Music: Manohar Khanna Lyrics: Manohar Khanna
Parichay	Satyen Bose	Abhi Bhattacharya, Pranoti Ghosh, Shashikala, Dhumal, Sajjan, Zebunissa, Shakuntala	Social Drama	Music: Vedpal, Shailesh Lyrics: Keshav Trivedi, Akhtar Yusuf
Pehli Jhalak	M. V. Raman	Kishore Kumar, Vyjayanthimala, Pran, Om Prakash, Dara Singh, Shammi, Jawahar Kaul, S Randhawa, Kamal Kant		Music: C. Ramchandra Lyrics: Rajendra Krishan
Pensioner	Jagdish Sethi	Shyama, Ram Mohan, Tiwari, Gulab, Ram Sharma, Cuckoo, Jagdish Sethi	Social	Music: Hansraj Behl Lyrics: Naqsh Lyallpuri, Indeevar, Uddhav Kumar
Pilpili Saheb	H. S. Kwatra	Shyama, Agha, Pran, Kuldip Kaur, Sunder, Mehmood, Lalita Kumari, Helen, Rajan Kapoor	Comedy	Music: Sardul Kwatra Lyrics: Hasrat Jaipuri, Verma Malik, Shailendra
Pooja	Bhagwan Das Varma	Bharat Bhushan, Purnima, Badri Prasad, Shakuntala, Om Prakash, Raj Mehra, Ulhas, Hiralal, S. Nazir, Jankidas	Social	Music: Shankar Jaikishan Lyrics: Shailendra, Hasrat Jaipuri
Prisoner of Golconda a.k.a. Golconda ka Qaidi	Premnath	Premnath, Bina Rai, Rajendra Nath, Hiralal, Shobhana Samarth, Agha, Ermeline, Cuckoo, Michael Shea	Costume	Music: Datta Davjekar, Jagannath Lyrics: Anjaan, Prakash Saathi
Pyaase Nain	S. Ram Sharma	Nimmi, Rehman, Shyama, Gope, Anwari Bai, Bhudo Advani, Mumtaz	Social	Music: S. K. Pal, Bulo C. Rani Lyrics: Waheed Qureshi, Kaif Irfani, D. N. Madhok
Radha Krishna	Raja Nene	Kamini Kaushal, Ratan Kumar, Vasant Rao, Indu Paul, Agha, Jankidas, Rajen Kapoor, Maruti, Shakuntala, Rajkumar	Devotional	Music: S. D. Burman Lyrics: Sahir Ludhianvi, Narendra Sharma,
Rajyogi Bharthari	Raman B. Desai	Trilok Kapoor, Sumitra Devi, Asha Mathur, Sapru, Jankidas, S. N. Tripathi, Moni Chatterjee, Bipin Gupta, Heera Sawant	Legend	Music: Shanker Rao Vyas Lyrics: Saraswati Kumar Deepak, Gopal Singh Nepali
Ramayan	Vijay Bhatt	Prem Adib, Shobhna Samarth, Shahu Modak, Umakant, Durga Khote	Religious	Music: Shankar Rao Vyas Lyrics: Ramesh Gupta, Baalam Pardesi
Rihaee	K. Ramnath			Music: Lyrics:
Rishta	Aslam	Nigar Sultana, Suresh, Anwar Hussain, Vijayalaxmi, Neelam, Leela Mishra, Ramlal, S. Nazir	Social	Music: K. Dutta Lyrics: Pandit Phani

== S-Z ==
Title	Director	Cast	Genre	Music
Saltanat	Dwarka Khosla	Manhar Desai, Shyama, Anwar Hussain, Sulochana, B. M. Vyas, Babu Raje, S. N. Tripathi, Neeru	Costume	Music: Chitragupta Lyrics: Gopal Singh Nepali, Anjum Jaipuri
Samaj	Vasant Joglekar	Ashok Kumar, Usha Kiran, Sumati Gupte, Shashikala, Anoop Kumar, Agha, Leela Mishra, Nazir Hussain, Samson	Social	Music: Arun Kumar Lyrics: Majrooh Sultanpuri
Samrat	Najam Naqvi	Ajit, Rehana, Kamlesh Kumari, Mumtaz Ali, Ram Singh, Sapru, S. L. Puri, Randhir	Costume Action	Music: Hemant Kumar Lyrics: Rajendra Krishan
Sangam	Kiran Kumar	Kamini Kaushal, Shekhar, Murad, K. N. Singh, Jeevan	Social	Music: Ram Ganguly Lyrics: Hasrat Jaipuri
Savdhan	Dutta Dharmadhikari	Motilal, Shyama, Shyam Kumar, Raja Gosavi, Paro Devi, Dada Mirasi, Ram Kumar	Social	Music: Vasant Ramachandra Lyrics: Sahir Ludhianvi
Shabab	M. Sadiq	Bharat Bhushan, Nutan, Badri Prasad, Shyam Kumar, Yashodara Katju, Wasti, Tun Tun	Costume Drama	Music: Naushad Lyrics: Shakeel Badayuni
Shaheed-E-Azad Bhagat Singh	Jagdish Gautam	Prem Adib, P. Jairaj, Smriti Biswas, Johnny Walker, Cuckoo, Amirbai Karnataki, Ashita Majumdar	Biopic	Music: Lachhiram Tamar Lyrics: Sahir Chandpuri, Shauqat Pardesi, Ram Prasad Bismil
Shama Parwana	D.D. Kashyap	Shammi Kapoor, Suraiya, Roopmala, Ulhas, Sunder, Mubarak, Roopmala, Naaz	Costume	Music: Husanlal Bhagatram Lyrics: Majrooh Sultanpuri
Shart	B. Mitra	I. S. Johar, Shyama, Shashikala, Mohana, Sulochana, Chaman Puri, Jagdish Kanwal	Social Drama	Music: Hemant Kumar Lyrics: S. H. Bihari, Rajendra Krishan
Sheeshe Ki Diwar	Manmohan Sabir	Pran, Veena, Manmohan Krishna, Cuckoo, Rashid Khan, Shammi	Social	Music: Shankar Dasgupta Lyrics: Manmohan Sabir
Sher Dil	Boman Shroff	Fearless Nadia, John Cawas, Sardar Mansur, Dalpat, H. Prakash, Charubala, Azim	Action Adventure	Music: Shafi M. Nagri Lyrics: Preetam Dehlvi, Saraswati Kumar Deepak, Raja Mehdi Ali Khan
Shiv Kanya	Dhirubhai Desai	Trilok Kapoor, Nirupa Roy, Anjali Devi, Lalita Pawar, Shakuntala, Niranjan Sharma	Religious	Music: Manna Dey Lyrics: Bharat Vyas, Ramesh Gupta, Saraswati Kumar Deepak
Shiv Ratri	Jayant Desai	Nirupa Roy, Trilok Kapoor, Manhar Desai, Radhakrishan, Minaxi, Niranjan Sharma	Devotional	Music: Chitragupta Lyrics: Gopal Singh Nepali
Shobha	Niren Lahiri	Abhi Bhattacharya, Usha Kiran, Chhabi Biswas, Sunanda Devi, Manju Dey	Family Drama	Music: Robin Banerjee Lyrics: Kaif Irfani, Mahendra Pran
Sitamgar	Akkoo	Baburao, Krishna Kumari, Sheikh, Leela Gupte	Action	Music: Nisar Lyrics: A. Afghani, Sheikh Adam
Subah Ka Tara	V. Shantaram	V. Shantaram, Jayshree, Pradeep Kumar, Rajshree, Amirbai Karnataki, Shakuntala, Neelam, Nimbalkar, Naaz, Romeo	Social Drama	Music: C. Ramchandra Lyrics: Noor Lakhnavi
Suhagan	Anant Mane	Geeta Bali, Jaswant, Sulochana, Vijaylaxmi, Jankidas, Shyam Kumar	Family Drama	Music: Vasant Desai, C. Ramachandra Lyrics: Ehsan Rizvi, Saraswati Kumar Deepak
Taxi Driver	Chetan Anand	Dev Anand, Kalpana Kartik, Johnny Walker, Sheila Ramani, M. A. Latif, Krishan Dhawan, Parveen Kaul, Hamid Sayani, Ratan Gaurang, Rashid Khan	Romance Action Drama	Filmfare Best Music Director Award for S. D. Burman. Music: S. D. Burman Lyrics: Sahir Ludhianvi
Teen Tasveereen	S. S. Solanki	Kishore Kumar, Sharada, Nina Makar, Anil, Munshi Khanjar	Social	Music: Neenu Majumdar Lyrics: Prem Dhawan
Tilottama	Babubhai Mistri	Chitra, Maruti, B. M. Vyas, Shri Bhagwan, Arvind Pandya, P. Kailash, Babu Raje, Indira Bansal	Mythological	Music: S. N. Tripathi Lyrics: Gopal Singh Nepali
Toofan	Ram Prakash	Munawwar Sultana, Vijaylaxmi, Amarnath, Sajjan, Pran, Tiwari, Pratima Devi	Action	Music: S. D. Batish Lyrics: Wahid Qureshi
Toote Khilone	Nanabhai Bhatt	Shekhar, Purnima, Asha Mathur Gulab, Master Romi, Babu Raje	Social	Music: Chitragupta Lyrics: Raja Mehdi Ali Khan, Anjum Jaipuri, Gopal Singh Nepali
Tulsidas	Balchandra, Harsukh Bhatt	Mahipal, Shyama, Dulari, Sunder, Ramesh, Raj Kumar, Uma Dutt, Chaman Puri	Biopic	Music: Chitragupta Lyrics: Gopal Singh Nepali
Waris	Nitin Bose	Suraiya, Talat Mehmood, Yakub, Achala Sachdev, Nadira, Sadat Ali, Gope, Roopmala	Family Drama	Music: Anil Biswas Lyrics: Majrooh Sultanpuri
Watan	Nanabhai Bhatt	Nirupa Roy, Trilok Kapoor, Munawwar Sultana, Jayant, Inayat Khan son of Jayant as child artist, Madan Puri, Cuckoo	Costume Drama	Music: Hafiz Khan Lyrics: Shewan Rizvi
