= Dilip Dholakia =

Indian music composer and singer (1921–2011)

Dilip Dholakia (15 October 1921 – 2 January 2011), often credited as D. Dilip or Diliprai in Hindi films, was an Indian music composer and singer. Born and educated in Junagadh, he was introduced to music in early life due to his family. Starting his career as singer, he assisted leading music composers of Bollywood and Gujarati cinema in 1960s and 1970s. He also composed music of eight Hindi as well as eleven Gujarati films.

== Early life ==
Dilip Dholakia was born on 15 October 1921 in Junagadh. When he was seven, he used to accompany his father Bhogilal and grandfather Manishankar Dholakia to Swaminarayan temple in Junagadh where they used to sing bhajans and play musical instruments. He was educated at Bahadur Khanji High School and Bahauddin College. He was trained in classical singing by Pandurang Amberkar, a disciple of Amanat Ali Khan.

== Career ==
Initially he worked as a clerk and accountant for two years in Department of Home Affairs of Bombay State. He worked in the same building which was also occupied by All India Radio (AIR) office. He was selected as an artist by AIR later.

He was offered by Khemchand Prakash’s brother Ratanlal to sing in Hindi film Kismatwala (1944). He sang three songs for the film, 'Gori Chalo Na Sina Ubharke..' and ‘Dekho Hamse Na Ankhe Ladaya Karo..’. He sang in chorus, Thukra Rahi Hai Duniya for Bhanwara (1944). In 1946, he sang ‘Dukh Ki Is Nagri Mein Baba Koi Na Puchhe Baat’ for film Laaj. In His Master's Voice studio, he was introduced to Snehal Bhatkar who helped him to produce records sung by him with lyrics written by Venibhai Purohit. These records were Bhint Fadi Ne Piplo Ugyo and Aadha Tail Aur Aadha Paani. In 1948, Avinash Vyas offered him two duet songs in film Sati Son. Later he assisted Chitragupta and sang in Bhakta Pundalik. He worked with him from 1951 to 1972 and contributed in several films; Insaaf, Kismat, Jindagi Ke Mele, Bhabhi, Kali Topi Lal Rumal. He also assisted S. N. Tripathi.

Soon he started composing songs and music independently for Hindi and Gujarati films and chose D. Dilip as his new identity. He composed music for several Hindi films; Bhaktamahima (1960), Saugandh (1961), Baghdad Ki Raaten (1962), Teen Ustad (1961) and Private Secretary (1962), Dagabaaz (1970), Veer Ghatotkach (1970) and Mata Vaishnavi Devi. In some films, he was credited as Dilip Roy. He also composed music of Bhojpuri film Daku Rani Ganga (1977).

He composed music of eleven Gujarati film starting with Satyawan Savitri in 1963. Other Gujarati films include Divadandi (1950), Mota Ghar Ni Dikri, Kanku (1969), Sat Na Parkhe, Snehbandhan and Jalam Sang Jadeja. He composed music of several popular songs for Gujarati films like 'Milan Na Deepak Sahu Bujhai Gaya Chhe...', a gazal from Snehbandhan written by Barkat Virani 'Befaam' and sung by Mohammed Rafi; ‘Eklaj Aavya Manva...’ from Jalam Sang Jadeja, written by 'Befaam' and sung by Bhupinder. He sang 'Taro Aankhno Afeeni' written by Venibhai Purohit and composed by Ajit Merchant for Divadandi (1950) which became hit and is still popular across Gujarat. His other popular Gujarati songs are 'Mane Andhara Bolave', and 'Paglu Paglama Atvanu,' 'Sathiya Puravo Dvare, 'Dhanna Dhatudi Patudi', 'Bole Milan No Mor'.

He assisted Laxmikant–Pyarelal from 1972 to 1988. He recorded his last composition on 15 February 1988.

He worked with Hridaynath Mangeshkar to record his compositions like Meera Bhajan (Part-I), Bhagavad Geeta, Gyaneshwari Geeta, an album of Urdu gazals by Ghalib. He also composed for His Master's Voice records sung by Lata Mangeshkar, Asha Bhosle, Kishori Amonkar. He composed music of Chausanthpadi written by Nishkulanand Swami.

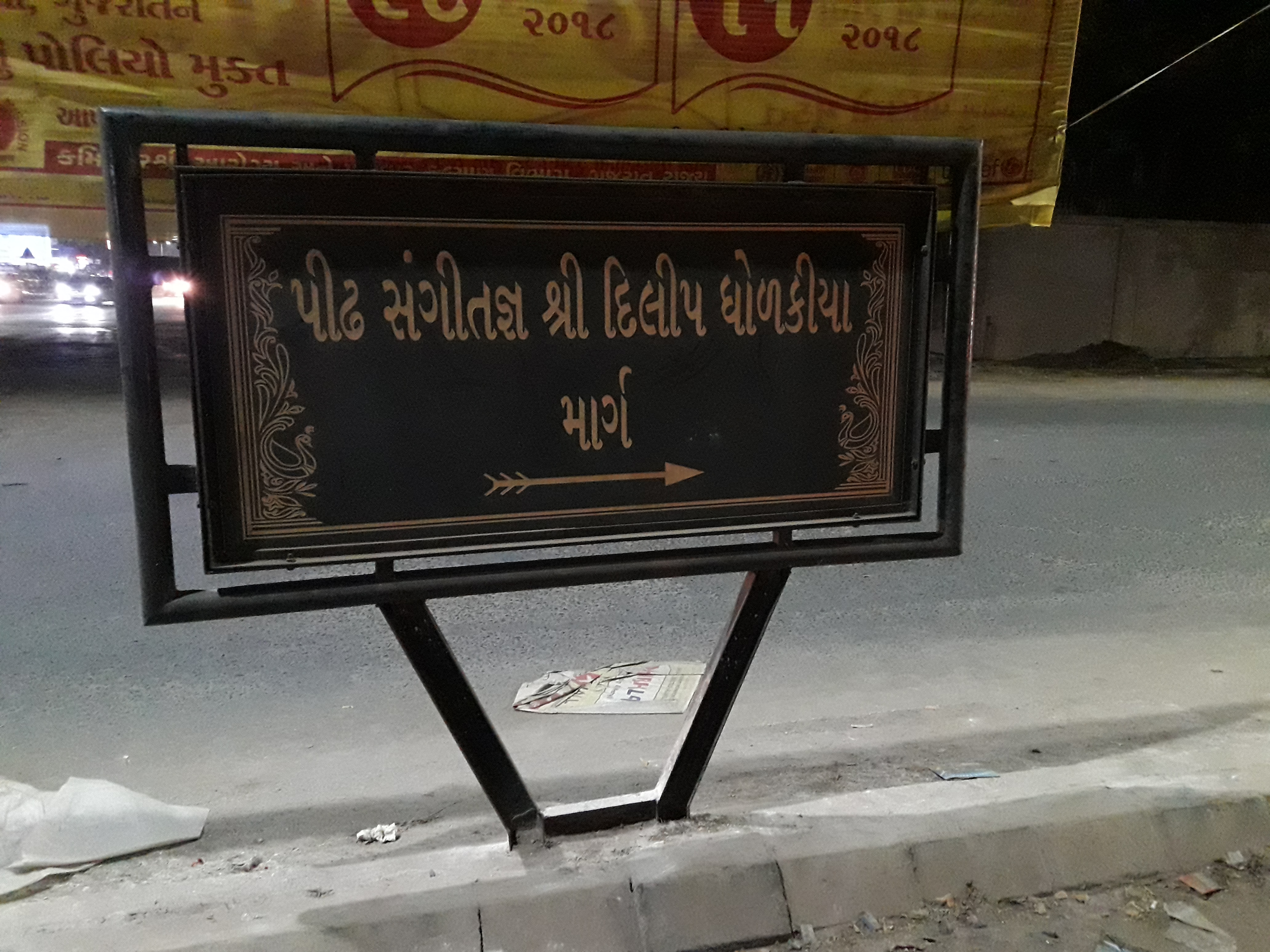
Dilip Dholakia Road, named after him, near Mansi Circle, Ahmedabad

He died on 2 January 2011 at Mumbai.

== Personal life ==
He was married to Dhrumanben and had two sons, Kandarp and Rajat. Rajat Dholakia is also music composer and singer.

== Discography ==
=== Music assistant ===
- Dost Garibon Ka (1989)
- Jaanoo (1985)
- Teesri Aankh (1982)
- Chunaoti (1980)
- Sargam (1979)
- Naya Din Nai Raat (1974)
- Pyar Ka Sapna (1969)
- Aulad (1968)
- Oonche Log (1965)
- Maain Bhi Ladki Hun (1964)
- Ganga Ki Lahren (1964)
- Burmah Road (1962)
- Shaadi (1962)
- Tel Malish Boot Polish (1961)
- Maa Baap (1960)
- Patang (1960)
- Barkha (1959)
- Guest House (1959)
- Kavi Kalidas (1959)
- Zimbo (1958)

=== Hindi ===
- Bhaktamahima (1960)
- Saugandh (1961)
- Baghdad Ki Raaten (1962)
- Teen Ustad (1961)
- Private Secretary (1962)
- Dagabaaz (1970)
- Veer Ghatotkach (1970)
- Mata Vaishnavi Devi

=== Gujarati ===
- Satyawan Savitri 1963
- Mota Ghar Ni Deekari alias Sneh bandhan 1967
- Kanku 1969
- Mena Gurjari 1975
- Daku Rani Ganga 1976
- Jaalamsingh Jadeja 1976
- Maadi Na Jaaya 1976
- Sat Na paarkhan 1976
- Bhagwan Swaminarayan 1982
- Jaya Parvati Vrut 1982
- Saajan Sonal De 1984

=== Acting ===
- Holiday in Bombay (1963)
