= Divadandi =

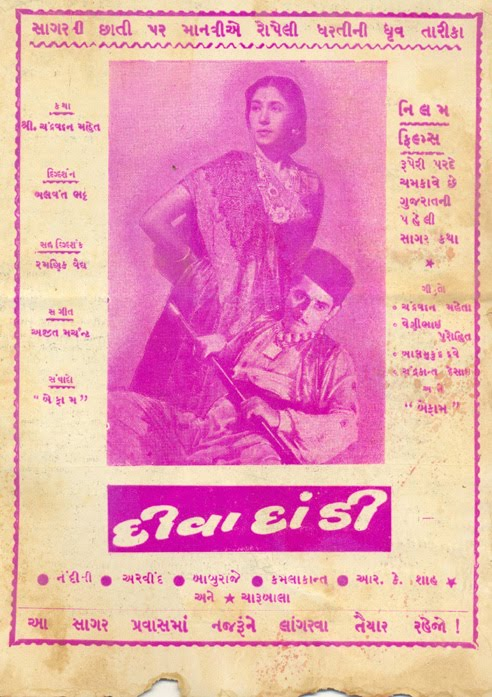
- Poster
- Directed by: Balwant Bhatt
- Written by: Ramnik Vaid (script), Chandravadan Mehta (story), Barkat Virani 'Befaam' (dialogues)
- Starring: Nandini; Arvind Pandya; Baburaje; Charubala; Kamalakant
- Cinematography: Haren Batt
- Music by: Ajit Merchant, Dilip Dholakia
- Production company: Neelam Films
- Release date: 1950
- Running time: 123 minutes
- Country: India
- Language: Gujarati

Divadandi (lit. 'The Lighthouse') is 1950 Indian Gujarati social drama film directed by Balwant Bhatt.

== Plot ==
Sailor Lakhu Malam raises and teaches sailing to his foster-son Kano. Lakhu's son Kavli feels jealous of Kano. When Kano falls in love with Motan, Kavli pushes Kano into opium addiction and kidnaps Motan. Lakhu challenges and kills Kavli. Lakhu is condemned for his crime and was served the penalty of taking care of an old lighthouse.

== Cast ==
The cast is as follows:

- Nandini as Motan
- Arvind Pandya as Kano
- Baburaje as Kavli
- Charubala
- Kamalkant as Lakhu Malam, foster-father of Kano and father of Kavli
- Lohana
- R. K. Shah

== Production ==
The film was shot at Bet Dwarka and features local traditional wooden ships.

== Soundtrack ==
The film is notable for its music composed by Ajit Merchant and Dilip Dholakia. It introduced lyricist Venibhai Purohit whose song "Taro Aankhno Afeeni" became hit and still remains popular in Gujarat. Lyrics were written by Chandravadan Mehta, Barkat Virani 'Befaam', Venibhai Purohit, Balmukund Dave and Chandrakant Desai.

Divadandi

Soundtrack album by Ajit Merchant, Dilip Dholakia
- Released: 1950
- Genre: Feature film soundtrack
- Language: Gujarati

All music is composed by Ajit Merchant, Dilip Dholakia.

Track listing
No.	Title	Lyrics	Singer(s)	Length
1.	"Tari Aankhno Afiini"	Venibhai Purohit	Dilip Dholakia
2.	"Vagada Vachhe Talavadi"	Balmukund Dave	Dilip Dholakia, Rohini Roy
3.	"Kajal Kali Raatladi"	Barkat Virani 'Befaam'	Meena Kapoor
4.	"Pandadi Si Hodi"	Chandravadan Mehta	Meena Kapoor
5.	"Ek Var Ghogha Jao"	Chandravadan Mehta	Chorus
6.	"Pumdu Panchhu Nahi Dau"	Venibhai Purohit	Meena Kapoor

== Reception ==
The film was not very successful but "Tari Aankhno Afeeni" became popular.
