= Krishnakant =

Indian actor and director (1922–2016)

- Born: Krishnakant Maganlal Bukhanwala; September 15, 1922
- Died: October 24, 2016 (aged 94)
- Occupations: Actor; Film director
- Works: See below

Krishnakant Maganlal Bukhanwala (15 September 1922 – 24 October 2016), also referred to as Krishnakant or KK, was an Indian actor and director who worked in Hindi and Gujarati cinema. According to Cinemaazi, in his career spanning over four decades, Krishnakant acted in more than 120 films as well as directed two Hindi- and 13 Gujarati-language films.

Krishnakant's notable Hindi film roles include Patita (1953), Seema (1955), Parvarish (1958), Dilli Ka Thug (1958), Do Chor (1972), Annadata (1972), and Kaala Sona (1975), as well as the Gujarati films Jeevno Jugari (1963) and Kanku (1969). From 1959 onwards he focused more on his stage career, earning acclaim among Gujarati audiences, before returning to cinema in the 1970s. The Gujarati films he subsequently directed included Daku Rani Ganga (1976), Kulvadhu (1977), Ghar Sansar, Visamo (both 1978), and Jog Sanjog (1980) — which earned significant critical and commercial success. He published an autobiography, Guzra Hua Zamana, in Gujarati in 2013. He died at age 94 in 2016.

== Filmography ==
=== As an actor ===
Sourced from BFI's Encyclopedia of Indian Cinema (1999):

- Paraya Dhan (1943)
- Chor (1950)
- Muqaddar (1950)
- Mashaal (1950)
- Andolan (1951)
- Daag (1952) as the moneylender
- Tamasha (1952)
- Zalzala (1952)
- Patita (1953) as Sadhuram
- Baadbaan (1954)
- Dhobi Doctor (1954)
- Naukri (1954) as the tenant
- Faraar (1955)
- Sabse Bada Rupaiya (1955)
- Ghar Ghar Mein Diwali (1955)
- Seema (1955) as Radha's husband
- Sailaab (1956)
- Jagte Raho (1956)
- Patrani (1956) as Ghunghru Mahraj
- Sudarshan Chakra (1956)
- Dhola Maru (1956)
- Agra Road (1957)
- Bandi (1957)
- Begunah (1957)
- Hum Panchhi Ek Daal Ke (1957)
- Yahudi Ki Ladki (1957)
- Bhabhi (1957)
- Ghar Sansar (1958)
- Detective (1958) as Sukhdev
- Howrah Bridge (1958)
- Mehndi (1958)
- Parvarish (1958) as Thakur Harnam Singh (also known as Bade Thakur)
- Post Box 999 (1958)
- Delhi Ka Thug (1958) as Sewakram
- Insaan Jaag Utha (1959)
- Satta Bazaar (1959)
- Madhu (1959) as Shambhu
- Ghar Ghar Ki Baat (1959)
- Jaal Saz (1959)
- Jaali Note (1960)
- Tanhaai (1961)
- Jivno Jugari (1963)
- Vanraj Chavdo (1963)
- Do Raaste (1969)
- Kanku (1969)
- Duniya Kya Jaane (1971)
- Hathi Mere Saathi (1971)
- Pyar Ki Kahani (1971)
- Sharmilee (1971)
- Paraya Dhan (1971)
- Mere Jeevan Saathi (1972)
- Do Chor (1972)
- Annadata (1972)
- Gunsundari No Ghar Sansar (1972)
- Gaai Aur Gori (1973)
- Suraj Aur Chanda (1973)
- Mr Romeo (1973)
- Manchali (1973)
- Parinay (1974)
- Ajnabi (1974)
- Trimurti (1974)
- Vardan (1974)
- Aarop (1974)
- Anari (1975)
- Kala Sona (1975)
- Sant Surdas (1975)
- Deewangee (1976)
- Koi Jeeta Koi Haara (1976)
- Sajjo Rani (1976)
- Dakurani Ganga – also director (1976)
- Jagriti (1977)
- Kulavadhu – also director (1977)
- Khoon Ki Pukar (1978)
- Visamo – also director (1978)
- Maa Dikri – also director (1978)
- Ghar Sansar – also director (1978)
- Sonba Ane Rupba – also director (1979)
- Maniyaro – also director (1980)
- Meru Mulande – also director (1980)
- Jog Sanjog – also director (1980)
- Hotel (1981)
- Prem Lagna – also director (1982)
- Dharmo – also director (1982)
- Jawabdaar – also director (1982)
- Main Awara Hoon (1983)
- Poojana Phool (1983)
- Teesra Kinara – also director (1986)
- Chhota Admi – also director (1986)
- Kharidar (1988)

=== As a director ===
- Muqaddar (1950) – Hindi – assistant director
- Daku Rani Ganga (1976) – Gujarati / Bhojpuri
- Kulvadhu (1977) – Gujarati
- Ghar Sansar (1978) – Gujarati
- Maa Dikri (1978) – Gujarati
- Vismao (1980) – Gujarati
- Sonba Ane Rupba (1979) – Gujarati
- Jog Sanjog (1980) – Gujarati
- Maniyaro (1980) – Gujarati
- Meru Mulande (1980) – Gujarati
- Dharmo (1982) – Gujarati
- Jawabdaar (1982) – Gujarati
- Prem Lagna (1982) – Gujarati
- Chhota Aadmi (1986) – Hindi
- Teesra Kinara (1986) – Hindi
