= Patita =

Patita (lit. 'degraded') may refer to:

- Patit, an apostate in Sikhism
- Patita (1953 film), a 1953 Indian Hindi-language film
- Patita (1980 film), a 1980 Indian Hindi-language film
