= Ajit Merchant =

Ajit Merchant was an Indian music composer and director.

== Early life ==
Ajit Merchant was born to a lawyer of Mumbai. His family natively belonged to Bet Dwarka. He was introduced to music by his father who used to take him to concerts of various musicians like Abdul Karim Khan. He was trained in music by Shivkumar Shukla.

He was married to Nilamben.

== Career ==
Merchant was a stage actor before venturing into music. He received the best actors award in the Mumbai State Drama Festival for his role in Pragji Dosa's play Anahat Naad.

He was invited by Chandravadan Mehta for his radio programme Ek Daayro in 1945. He presented some songs like ‘Ekvar Ghogha Jajo Re Gheriya’ and ‘Pandadi Shi Hodi'. He impressed the radio station director and started performing on radio. After leaving All India Radio, he was involved with Navi Rangbhoomi. He composed music of more than 250 Gujarati, Hindi and Marathi stage plays.

He reached his popularity with his film Divadandi (1950). He produced the film with a story written by Chandravadan Mehta and a screenplay by Barkat Virani 'Befam'. Though the film was moderately successful, the song, Taro Aankhno Afeeni was a huge hit. The music was composed by Ajit himself and was sung by Dilip Dholakia. The song is still popular across Gujarat.

He was a neighbor of Hindi playback singer, Mukesh and he agreed to sing his compositions in some Gujarati films like Kariyavar and Lagna Mandap. He composed a gazal, Raat Khamosh Hai which was later sung by Jagjit Singh and included in his album, Muntazir.

He died on 18 March 2011.

== Filmography ==
He composed and directed music of several Hindi films like Sapera (1961), Refugee (1948), Indra Leela (1956), Challenge (1964), Chandi Pooja (1957), Lady Killer (1968), Ram Bhakta Vibhishan (1958), Raj Kumari (1955); and Gujarati films like Divadandi (1950), Kariyavar (1948), Lagna Mandap, Bahurooi.

== Awards ==
He was awarded the Lifetime Achievement award by Maharashtra Rajya Gujarati Sahitya Akademi in 2007.
