= Saiyan Se Neha Lagaibe =

1965 Indian Bhojpuri-language film

- Directed by: S. M. Abbas
- Written by: Ibrahim Asravi
- Produced by: M. Yahya
- Starring: Naaz; Sujit Kumar; Gajanan Jagirdar; Kumud Tripathi
- Cinematography: N. Satyen
- Edited by: Ramchandra Mahadik
- Music by: Ghulam Mohammed
- Production company: Zohra Films
- Release date: 1965
- Running time: 125 minutes
- Country: India
- Language: Bhojpuri

Saiyan Se Neha Lagaibe (Bhojpuri for I will love my darling) is a 1965 Indian Bhojpuri-language drama film directed by S. M. Abbas and written by Ibrahim Asravi. Produced by M. Yahya under Zohra Films, it stars Naaz and Sujit Kumar in the main leads alongside Gajanan Jagirdar and Kumud Tripathi in supporting roles.

The film marked the Bhojpuri cinema debut of two well-known figures — music composer Mohammed Ghulam and writer-director S. M. Abbas. Meanwhile, the lead pair, Sujit Kumar and Naaz, had earlier shared the screen in the Bhojpuri blockbuster Bidesiya (1963). Following the success of that film, Sujit Kumar became one of the most prominent personalities in Bhojpuri cinema, while Naaz rose to fame as a highly sought-after actress for her remarkable performance in Bidesiya.

== Plot ==
A young woman falls deeply in love with her beloved, striving to win his affection amid family opposition and social barriers. Their romance unfolds through secret meetings and heartfelt devotion, facing trials that test their bond. Ultimately, true love prevails, celebrating Bhojpuri traditions of longing and reconciliation.

== Cast ==
- Naaz
- Sujit Kumar
- Gajanan Jagirdar
- Kumud Tripathi
- Yunus Parvez
- Kundan
- Jamil
- Chandrima Bhaduri
- Sadhana Khote
- Radheshyam
- Moppet Raja
- Sheela R.
- Daisy Irani
- Bela Bose

== Soundtrack ==
The music was composed by Ghulam Mohammed with lyrics by Shailendra.

Saiyan Se Neha Lagaibe soundtrack
No.	Title	Singer(s)
1	"Naina More Kajrare"	Kamal Barot, Shamshad Begum
2	"Fulwa Niyar Naar Sukvaar"	Mohammed Rafi
3	"Mor Bagiya Gujar Gaile Amava"	Suman Kalyanpur
