= Samjhauta (film) =

- Directed by: Ajay Biswas
- Produced by: Sandeep Sethi
- Starring: Anil Dhawan; Yogeeta Bali; Shatrughan Sinha; Pradeep Kumar; Naaz; Sulochana Latkar
- Music by: Kalyanji-Anandji
- Release date: 1 June 1973
- Country: India
- Language: Hindi

Samjhauta (English: Compromise) is a 1973 Bollywood drama film directed by Ajay Biswas and produced by Sandeep Sethi. A remake of the 1969 Bengali film Panna Hirey Chuni, it stars Anil Dhawan, Yogeeta Bali, Shatrughan Sinha, Pradeep Kumar, Naaz, and Sulochana Latkar in pivotal roles. The music was composed by Kalyanji-Anandji.

== Cast ==
- Anil Dhawan as Gopal
- Yogeeta Bali as Shanno
- Shatrughan Sinha as Shankar
- Pradeep Kumar as Bhola
- Naaz as Champa
- Sulochana Latkar as Gopal & Champa's Mother
- Gautam Mukherjee

== Soundtrack ==
All songs were composed by Kalyanji Anandji. Indeevar and Verma Malik wrote the lyrics.

The song "Samjautha Ghamon Se Kar Lo" was made in two versions, male and female, sung by Kishore Kumar and Lata Mangeshkar.

1. "Badi Dur Se Aaye Hain, Pyaar Kaa Tohafaa Laaye Hain" - Mohammed Rafi, Mukesh
2. "Samajhautaa Gamon Se Kar Lo" - Kishore Kumar
3. "Sabake Rahate Lagataa Hai Aise Koi NahinHai Meraa" - Mohammed Rafi
4. "Samjhauta Ghamo Se Karlo (Female)" - Lata Mangeshkar
5. "Na Roop Dekhiye Na Naam Dekhiye" - Kishore Kumar
6. "Jo Dilo Ke Naate Hai" - Mohammed Rafi
7. "Tanak Tuk Tanda" - Kishore Kumar (written by Verma Malik)
8. "Are Sun Bhaiya Sun" - Mohammed Rafi
