= Dushman (1957 film) =

- Directed by: Raja Rishi
- Written by: Pt. Mukhram Sharma
- Screenplay by: Pt. Mukhram Sharma
- Story by: Pt. Mukhram Sharma
- Produced by: H. S. Kwatra
- Starring: Dev Anand; Usha Kiran; Kumkum
- Cinematography: G. Kale; M. W. Mukadam
- Edited by: R. V. Shrikhande; Vishnu Kumar
- Music by: Husnlal Bhagatram
- Release date: August 2, 1957
- Country: India
- Language: Hindi

Dushman (transl. Enemy) is a 1957 Indian Hindi-language drama film directed by Raja Rishi. The film stars Dev Anand and Usha Kiran.

== Plot ==
Ram Singh (Master Romi) is a schoolboy who one day brings home a penknife, which one of his classmate had forgotten to take back. He shows it to his mother, saying that he must return it the next day. His mother, however, says it need not be returned and uses it. This pampering and encouragement to take another person's property by his mother spoils Ram Singh. He soon begins to steal frequently from others and becomes a dacoit.

One day, Ram Singh (Dev Anand) now grown up, is escaping from the police after being betrayed by a dancing girl, Gulnar (Kumkum), who dies in the crossfire between cops and bandits. He jumps aboard a train where he meets a fellow conman, Kirorilal (Radha Krishen), who becomes his partner in crime. The train reaches Allahabad. Soon after arriving, he comes across a group of girls playing on swings. Among them is Sheila (Usha Kiron), who is wearing a necklace Ram Singh takes a fancy to. He cuts the rope with his knife, resulting in Sheila falling into a river nearby. He saves her, while secretly stealing the necklace.

Ram Singh soon discovers that Sheila's brother is none other than a CID inspector named Mehta (Prabhu Dayal), from whom he had previously escaped. He then woos and marries Sheila to make sure that Mehta will not be able to arrest him. Ram Singh continues to steal, but Mehta discovers him in due course. Mehta immediately reveals the truth about Ram Singh to Sheila, leading to an altercation between Ram Singh and Mehta. The former manages to escape. Meanwhile, Sheila becomes pregnant and gives birth to a son.

After learning of the birth of his child and being unable to bear the separation from his wife, Ram Singh is reformed, and lives on charity while finding shelter in temples. Years later, he notices Sheila and his son and meets them. Once when the child is sick, Ram Singh asks Kirorilal for help. When refused by the latter, Ram Singh, left with no alternative, steals from him leading to Kirorilal informing the police. Sheila, on the other hand, throws away the stolen money and the medicine that Ram Singh brought with it. Soon the police arrive on the scene and he surrenders to them.

== Cast ==
- Dev Anand as Ram Singh
- Usha Kiran as Sheela
- Kumkum as Gulnar
- Prabhu Dayal as Mehta
- Master Romi as young Ram Singh
- Radha Kishan as Karodilal
- Minoo Mumtaz

== Soundtrack ==
Dushman

Soundtrack album by Husnlal Bhagatram
- Released: 1957
- Label: HMV
- Producer: Husnlal Bhagatram

The music was composed by the duo Husnlal Bhagatram. The lyrics are written by Prem Dhawan, Pyarelal Santoshi & Tanveer Naqvi. On the album, film critic Suresh Kohli of The Hindu noted that except for "O Lootnewale Duniya Ko", the other songs "were even hummable".

Song	Singer
"Main Jadugar Bangal Ka"	Mohammed Rafi
"O Lootnewale Duniya Ko, Ek Din Tu Bhi Loot Jayega"	Mohammed Rafi, Sudha Malhotra
"Aji Loot Liya Dil Ko Bahane Karke"	Mohammed Rafi, Asha Bhosle
"Dhake Ki Malmal"	Asha Bhosle
"Bahar Aayi, Ghata Chhayi"	Asha Bhosle
"Tikhe Hai Nainwa Ke Baan Ji, Dhokha Na Khana"	Asha Bhosle, S. D. Batish

== Reception ==
Kohli wrote that "the film worked at the box office and added to Anand's popularity. The film had one of his best performances."
