= Muqaddar (film) =

- Directed by: Aravind Sen
- Produced by: Bombay Talkies
- Starring: Nalini Jaywant; Sajjan
- Music by: Khemchand Prakash
- Release date: 1950
- Country: India
- Language: Hindi

Muqaddar is a 1950 Indian Hindi-language film produced by Bombay Talkies. It was directed by Aravind Sen, with Krishnakant (who also acted in the film) serving as Sen's assistant. The film starred Nalini Jaywant and Sajjan, who acted a few lead roles and later transitioned into a character actor. Kishore Kumar also made one of his early screen appearances in a supporting role. The film's music was composed by Khemchand Prakash.

In a review, Thought described the film as "the story of how a woman's love reforms the basest criminal, dead to all human sentiments of piety, goodness, mercy and kindness".

In 1978, The Illustrated Weekly of India noted that despite its production values, Muqaddar was released at a time when Bombay Talkies was "under an eclipse", and that the film did "little to save its dying prestige".

== Cast ==
- Nalini Jaywant
- Sajjan
- Kishore Kumar
- Iftekhar
- Krishnakant
