= Kanku =

- Film poster
- Directed by: Kantilal Rathod
- Written by: Pannalal Patel
- Based on: Kanku by Pannalal Patel
- Produced by: Kantilal Rathod
- Starring: Kishore Bhatt; Kishore Jariwala; Pallavi Mehta
- Cinematography: Kumar Jaywant
- Music by: Dilip Dholakia
- Production company: Akar Films
- Release date: 1969 (India)
- Running time: 148 minutes
- Country: India
- Language: Gujarati

Kanku is a 1969 Gujarati social drama film, starring Kishore Bhatt, Kishore Jariwala, Pallavi Mehta, directed and produced by Kantilal Rathod. The film deals with struggles of a widow, Kanku. The film was adapted from Pannalal Patel's short story of the same name. The film won National Film Award for Best Feature Film in Gujarati at the 17th National Film Awards.

== Plot ==
The film is set in rural north Gujarat. Kanku marries Khumo and their marriage life is happy. Khumo dies at young age while Kanku is pregnant. She is a widow in grief but waits for birth of her son Hiriyo. When Hiriyo is born, she spends most of her time in raising him. Many prospective males proposes remarriage but she declines and does farming and raising his son in struggles of poverty.

She has to take loans during her struggles from a merchant Malakchand from nearby village. Malakchand is widower and has feelings for Kanku. She also has soft feeling for him too but both do not openly tell each other. When Hiriyo gets older and Kanku goes to Malakchand to take loan for Hiriyo's marriage. During this time, she was in physical relationship with Malakchand. Hiriyo's marries. Following her pregnancy, the village folk and neighbours gossip about her. She bravely declares her intention to remarry and convinces her son who has initially opposed her. She marries Malakchand.

== Cast ==
The principal cast was as follows:

- Pallavi Mehta as Kanku;
- Kishore Jariwala as Khumo;
- Kishore Bhatt as Malakchand;
- Arvind Joshi;
- Krishnakant Bhukhanwala;
- Arvind Rathod;
- Narayan Rajgor.

== Production ==
Gujarati writer Pannalal Patel had written a 20-pages long short story Kanku in 1936 for Diwali Special edition of Nav-Saurashtra magazine. Kantilal Rathod contacted him and convinced him to adapt it into film. Patel also helped him writing script and dialogues of the film.

== Soundtrack ==
Kanku

Soundtrack album by Dilip Dholakia
- Genre: Feature film soundtrack
- Length: 13:46
- Label: Saregama

All lyrics are written by Venibhai Purohit; all music is composed by Dilip Dholakia

Track list
No.	Title	Lyrics	Singer(s)	Length
1.	"Luchchan Re Luchchan"	Venibhai Purohit	Ismail Valera	3:18
2.	"Aa Mast Ghatao Shravanni"	Venibhai Purohit	Ismail Valera	3:28
3.	"Mune Andhara Bolave"	Venibhai Purohit	Hansa Dave	3:27
4.	"Paglu Paglaman Atvanun"	Venibhai Purohit	Hansa Dave	3:33
Total length:				13:46

== Release ==
The film was released in theatres in 1969. The film was released on Home Video DVD by Moser Baer. It has shorter cut of 136 minutes, 12 minutes less than the original.

== Reception ==
The film was commercially successful and was critically acclaimed. Film critic Amrit Gangar considered Kanku as the "first real spark in Gujarati cinema firmament". The song "Mune Andhara Bolave" became popular.

== Accolades ==
Pallavi Mehta won an award at 6th Chicago International Film Festival in 1970. The film won the National Film Award for Best Feature Film in Gujarati at the 17th National Film Awards. The film also received four state awards: Best Director to Rathod, Best Cinematography to Kumar Jaywant, Best Story for Pannalal Patel and Special Prize for Gujarati Film Produced in Gujarati. A copy of film is archived at Film and Television Institute of India, Pune.

== Adaptation ==
After success of film, Pannalal Patel expanded short story into novel and was serialized in Jansatta daily in 1970. He dedicated novel to Kantilal Rathod.
