= Usha Kiran =

Indian actress

- Born: Usha Marathe; 22 April 1929; Vasai, Bombay Presidency, British India (now Maharashtra, India)
- Died: 9 March 2000 (aged 70); Nashik, Maharashtra, India
- Occupation: Actress
- Years active: 1949–2000
- Spouse: Manohar Kher (m. 1954)
- Children: Tanvi Azmi, Advait Kher
- Relatives: Baba Azmi (son-in-law); Saiyami Kher (granddaughter)

Usha Kiran (22 April 1929 – 9 March 2000) was an Indian actress. In a career spanning over four decades, she acted in over 50 Hindi and Marathi films, notably Daag (1952), Patita (1953), Baadbaan (1954), Chupke Chupke (1975), Mili (1975) and Bawarchi (1972). She was also the Sheriff of Mumbai during 1996 and 1997.

== Early life ==
Usha Kiran was born Usha Bapu Marathe on 22 April 1929, into a middle-class family in Vasai. She was the daughter of Bapu Marathe and Radha Marathe. Despite facing limited financial circumstances, her father encouraged her interest in the performing arts from a young age and provided her with training in dance.

At the age of twelve, she made her acting debut on stage in M. G. Rangnekar’s play Aashirwad. Her dancing skills caught the attention of the noted dancer and filmmaker Uday Shankar, who cast her in his 1948 Hindi-language dance film Kalpana, which was produced in Madras. After completing the filming and returning to Mumbai, Rangnekar cast her in his film Kuber, where she performed under her birth name, Usha Marathe.

== Career ==
She began her acting career on stage with M.G. Rangnekar's Marathi play Ashirwad. She entered the Hindi film industry with a small role in Uday Shankar's dance-drama film Kalpana (1948). She went on to act in numerous popular Hindi films such as Nazrana (1961), Daag (1952), and Baadbaan (1954), (for which she won the very first Filmfare Award for Best Supporting Actress in 1955), Kabuliwala (1961), Patita (1953), Mili, Bawarchi (1972) and Chupke Chupke (1975).

Her famous Marathi films include Shikleli Bayko, Jasach Tase, Postatli Mulgi, Dudh Bhakar, Stree Janma Hi Tuzi Kahani, Kanyadaan (for which she received the Maharashtra Government's award for best actress), Gariba Gharchi Lek, and Kanchanganga.

She starred opposite Hindi film actors such as Kishore Kumar, Raj Kapoor, Dev Anand, Ashok Kumar, Dilip Kumar, Rajendra Kumar, Rajesh Khanna, Dharmendra and Amitabh Bachchan.

She died in Nashik at the age of 70.

== Personal life ==
Usha was born into a Marathi-speaking family as Usha Balkrishna Marathe, daughter of Balkrishna Vishnu Marathe and his wife Radhabai Marathe. She was the second among five daughters. She was married to Dr. Manohar Kher, who became Dean of Sion Hospital in Mumbai. They were the parents of two children, a son, Advait Kher and a daughter, Tanvi Azmi. Usha Kiran's son Advait is a former model, now settled in Nashik with his wife Uttara (who was Femina Miss India of 1982) and his two daughters Saunskruti Kher and Saiyami Kher. Usha Kiran's daughter Tanvi Azmi is a well known television and film actress, married to cinematographer Baba Azmi, brother of Shabana Azmi.

== Filmography ==
Year	Film	Role	Language	Notes
1947	Kuber	Usha	Marathi	Debut film
1948	Sita Swayamwar	Sita	Marathi	
1948	Kalpana	Usha	Hindi	Small role
1949	Garibi	Kiran	Hindi	Small role
1949	Maya Baazar	Maya	Marathi	
1949	Vevishal	Ushakumari	Gujarati	
1950	Chalitil Shejari	Chawl Vendor	Marathi	
1950	Krantiveer Vasudev Balwant	Gopikabai	Marathi	
1950	Shri Krishna Darshan	Radha	Marathi	
1950	Raj Rani	Rani	Hindi	
1950	Gauna	Gauna	Hindi	
1950	Bhagwan Shri Krishna	Radha	Hindi	
1951	Bala Jo Jo Re	Aai	Marathi	
1951	Jashas Tase	Madhavi	Marathi	
1951	Vitthal Rakhumai	Rukmini	Marathi	
1951	Shri Vishnu Bhagwan	Lakshmi	Hindi	
1951	Sarkar		Hindi	
1951	Maya Macchindra	Maya	Marathi	
1951	Madhosh	Raina	Hindi	
1952	Mard Maratha	Sai	Marathi	
1952	Bel Bhandara		Marathi	
1952	Doodh Bhat		Marathi	
1952	Stree Janma Hi Tuzi Kahani	Usha	Marathi	
1952	Lal Kunwar	Lal Kunwar	Hindi	
1952	Dhobi Doctor	Uma	Hindi	
1952	Daag	Pushpa (Pushpi)	Hindi	
1953	Patita	Radha	Hindi	
1953	Dhuaan	Rani	Hindi	
1954	Dost	Usha	Hindi	
1954	Aulad	Maa	Hindi	
1954	Husn Ka Chor	Husn	Hindi	
1954	Shobha	Shobha	Hindi	
1954	Samaj	Usha	Hindi	
1954	Kanchanganga	Kanchan	Marathi	
1954	Postatil Mulgi	Postgirl	Marathi	
1954	Badshah	Rani	Hindi	
1954	Baadbaan	Mohnia	Hindi	Filmfare Award for Best Supporting Actress
1954	Adhikar	Usha	Hindi	
1955	Kalgi Tura	Kalgi	Marathi	
1955	Punvechi Raat		Marathi	
1955	Oot Patang		Hindi	
1955	Bahu	Bahurani	Hindi	
1956	Guru Ghantal		Hindi	
1956	Parivar		Hindi	
1956	Ayodhyapati	Sita	Hindi	
1956	Anuraag		Hindi	
1956	Aawaz	Bela	Hindi	
1956	Priti Sangam	Preeti	Marathi	
1957	Dushman	Sheila	Hindi	
1957	Jeevan Sathi		Hindi	
1957	Musafir	Uma	Hindi	
1958	Trolley Driver		Hindi	
1959	Shikleli Bayko	Kamalini	Marathi	
1959	Saata Janmachi Sobati	Pramila	Marathi	
1960	Mendi Rang Lagyo	Alka	Gujarati	
1960	Chaal Majhya Paayat	Asha	Marathi	
1960	Kanyadaan	Sumitra	Marathi	
1960	Sakhya Savra Mala		Marathi	
1960	Dil Bhi Tera Hum Bhi Tere	Prema	Hindi	
1961	Kabuliwala	Rama	Hindi	
1961	Tanhai		Hindi	
1961	Nazrana	Geeta	Hindi	
1961	Mansala Pankh Astat	Nurse	Marathi	
1961	Ek Dhaaga Sukhacha		Marathi	
1962	Amrit Manthan	Sumitra	Hindi	
1962	Saptapadi	Ushabai	Marathi	
1962	Sunbai	Sunbai	Marathi	
1962	Gariba Gharchi Lek	Mangal	Marathi	Maharashtra State Film Award for Best Actress
1963	Gharni Shobha		Hindi	
1963	Gehra Daag	Usha	Hindi	
1972	Bawarchi	Shobha Sharma	Hindi	
1972	Badi Maa	Badi Maa	Hindi	
1975	Chupke Chupke	Sumitra Sharma	Hindi	
1975	Mili	Sharda Khanna	Hindi	
1979	Lage Bandhe		Hindi	
1980	Fatakdi	Lakshmi Narayan	Marathi	
1980	Chambal Ki Kasam	Jamuna	Hindi	
1982	Samraat	Mrs. Chawla	Hindi	
1983	Mehndi	Gautam's Mom	Hindi	
1989	Bahurani	Lakshmi Chaudhary	Hindi	
