= Daku Rani Ganga =

- Directed by: Krishnakant
- Written by: Harkisan Mehta
- Produced by: Tushar Mehta
- Starring: See below
- Release dates: 1976 (Gujerati version); 1977 (Bhojpuri version)
- Country: India
- Languages: Gujarati, Bhojpuri

Daku Rani Ganga is a 1976 Gujarati film directed by Krishnakant. It was based on a Gujarati novel Pravah Paltayo written by Harkisan Mehta. The film was produced by his son Tushar Mehta. It was also dubbed and released as a Bhojpuri film in 1977, with the dubbing directed by Marathi film director Datta Keshav.

== Cast ==
- Ragini Shah
- Urmila Bhatt
- Kishore Jariwala
- Arvind Joshi
- Arvind Pandya
- Rajiv
- Krishnakant as Totaram (Ganga's uncle)

== Soundtrack ==
No.	Title	Singer(s)	Length
1.	"Chandni Raate"	Anuradha Paudwal, Mukesh
2.	"Bole Milan No Mor"	Asha Bhosle, Dilip Dholakia
3.	"He Pavan Vasanti Vato"	Anand Kumar C., Manna Dey
4.	"Sanvariyani Unchi Unchi Atari"	Asha Bhosle
