= Mena Gurjari =

- Directed by: Dinesh Raval
- Based on: Folklore of Mena Gurjari
- Produced by: Punambhai C Patel
- Starring: Mallika Sarabhai; Rajeev; Champshibhai Nagda; Manjari; P. Kharsani; Ramesh Mehta; Manjari Desai
- Music by: Dilip Dholakia
- Production companies: Lakshmi Film Laboratory and Studios Pvt. Ltd., Vadodara
- Release date: 1975
- Running time: 137 Minute
- Country: India
- Language: Gujarati

Mena Gurjari (Gujarati: મેના ગુર્જરી) is a 1975 Indian Gujarati film directed by Dinesh Raval. It was produced by Punambhai Patel under banner of Lakshmi Film Laboratory and Studios Pvt. Ltd.. The soundtrack was composed by Dilip Dholakia.

== Plot ==
The story of the film is based on folklore. Born to Merubha, Mena is brave since childhood. She has been vocal in raising her voice against atrocities on women. She teaches a lesson to Mukhi's lustful son and to the robber who casts a bad eye on the Mukhiya's daughter. She is married to Kunwar Chandaji Thakor (Rajeev) of Gokulgarh. Once Chandaji reach out for help to the sultan in the battle with the enemies. Mena visits sultan's camp with some of her friends to meet Chandaji. There, the sultan's eyes fall on Mena and he gets attracted to her. The king, wounded by Mena's taunts, imprisons her. In the end, Chandaji frees Mena from the king's captivity with his cleverness and bravery.

== Cast ==
The principal cast is as follows:

- Mallika Sarabhai as Mena
- Rajeev as Chandaji Thakor
- Champashibhai Nagda
- Manjari Desai
- Chandrakant Pandya
- P. Kharsani
- Ramesh Mehta
- Arvind Pandya

Supporting cast include:

- Indumati Rajda
- Devyani
- Dr. Arun Desai
- Lakshmi Patel
- Jogenkumar (as guest actor)

== Soundtrack ==
Usha Mangeshkar, Dilip Dholakia, Dilraj Kaur, A. R. Oza, Usha Rege, Anandkumar C. are the playback singars.

The soundtrack is as follows:

Mena Gurjari

Soundtrack album by Dilip Dholakia
- Released: 1975
- Genre: Feature film soundtrack
- Language: Gujarati

All lyrics are written by Ramesh Gupta, Bhaskar Vora; all music is composed by Dilip Dholakia

Track listing
No.	Title	Lyrics	Singer(s)	Length
1.	"Ranchandi Durga Chamunda"	Ramesh Gupta	Anandkumar C.
2.	"Sathiya Puravo Dvare"	Ramesh Gupta	Usha Mangeshkar, Anandkumar C.	4:45
3.	"Jay Jay Madi Jagdambe Mahakali"	Ramesh Gupta	Chorus	1:46
4.	"Ardhi Ratladie, Mane Re Jagadi, Chhanchhedi Man Vinana Tar"	Ramesh Gupta	Usha Mangeshkar, Dilip Dholakia	3:14
5.	"Chundadi Odhhadi Mane Jashodana Kan ten, Gheli Kari"	Ramesh Gupta	Usha Mangeshkar	3:23
6.	"Itna Gussa Kahe Gori, Hu to Prem Diwano.. Matakina Mool"	Bhaskar Vora	Anandkumar C., Pushpa Shah, Usha Rege	6:41
7.	"Goras Lyo Koi, Goras Lyo... Hu To Mahiyaran Aavi"	Ramesh Gupta	Usha Mangeshkar	3:20
8.	"Tari Ne Mari Jodi, Dhanna Dhatudi Patudi"	Ramesh Gupta	Dilraj Kaur, A. R. Oza	3:01

== Reception ==
The film was commercially successful and celebrated its silver jubilee (25 weeks). It was awarded by the Government of Gujarat for the year 1975-76 in the categories of Best Playback Singer (Usha Mangeshkar) and Best Art Director (Rafiqbhai Patel). The song "Sathiya Puravo Madi, Divda Pragtavo Raj" became a hit.
