= Venibhai Purohit =

Gujarati poet, lyricist and journalist

Venibhai Jamnadas Purohit (1916-1980) was Gujarati poet, lyricist, short story writer and journalist.

== Life ==
Venibhai was born on 1 February 1916 in Jamkhambhaliya. He completed his primary education in Bombay and secondary education in Bombay. He joined Be Ghadi Moj for sometime in Bombay. He proof read in Prabhat daily, Bhartiya Sahitya Sangh and Sastu Sahitya in Ahmedabad from 1939 to 1942 . He participated in Quit India Movement in 1942 and was jailed for ten months. He worked with Prajabandhu and Gujarat Samachar from 1944 to 1949. He worked with Janmabhoomi daily from 1949 until his death. He died on 3 January 1980 at Bombay.

Umashankar Joshi used to call him Bando Badami. Balmukund Dave was his close friend.

== Works ==
He wrote under several pen names such as Sant Khurshidas.

He explored several types of poetry including Bhajan, Gazal, Sonnet. Sinjarav (1955), Gulzare Shayari (1962), Deepti (1966) and Aachman (1975) are his collections of poetry. His Kavyaprayag (1978) is a work on medieval and modern poems.

He wrote lyrics for several Gujarati films like Kanku (1969), Kariyavar, Gunsundarino Gharsansar, Jogidas Khuman (1948) and Divadandi (1950). His song Taro Aankhno Afeeni from Divadandi became and currently remains the greatest love song of all time and is still popular in Gujarat.

Attarna Diva (1952), Vansnu Van and Setu are the collections of short stories.

He wrote satirical column in Janmabhoomi under pen name Akha Bhagat.

== See also ==
- List of Gujarati-language writers
