= Madhosh (1951 film) =

1951 film

- Poster
- Directed by: J.B.H. Wadia
- Written by: R.V. Dighe (novel "Pankala"); J.B.H. Wadia
- Produced by: J.B.H. Wadia
- Starring: Manher Desai; Meena Kumari; Usha Kiran; Rajan
- Music by: Madan Mohan (soundtrack); Vilayat Khan (background score)
- Release date: 1951
- Country: India
- Language: Hindi

Madhosh (transl. "Drunk" or "Intoxicated") is a 1951 Bollywood film. The story was loosely based on Romeo and Juliet.

== Cast ==
- Manhar Desai as Raya
- Meena Kumari as Soni
- Usha Kiran as Raina
- Rajan as Anand
- Kuldeep Akhtar as Rambhaji, Raya's father
- Mubarak as Bhujba or Bhujwa, Soni's father
- Jilloo Maa (as Jiloo) as Soni's mother and Bhujba's wife
- S. Nazir as Shakriya
- Habib Sandow as Pahadji
- Shiv Dutt as Vamia
- Bismillah (as Bismilla) as Narayan
- Ramakrishna as Panditji (as Ram Krishan)
- Goldstein as Police Superintendent

== Music ==
All film songs were written by lyricist Raja Mehdi Ali Khan and music composed by Madan Mohan.

Song	Singer
"Meri Yaad Mein Tum Na Aansoo Bahana"	Talat Mahmood
"Mere Dil Ki Nagariya Mein Aana"	Lata Mangeshkar
"Hamen Ho Gaya Tumse Pyar"	Lata Mangeshkar
"Meri Aankhon Ki Neend Le Gaya"	Lata Mangeshkar
"Chhod Mujhe Na Jana"	Lata Mangeshkar
"Jab Aanewale Aate Hai"	Lata Mangeshkar
"Dil Dhak Dhak Dhak" - 1	Lata Mangeshkar
"Dil Dhak Dhak Dhak" - 2	Chandbala
"Pagdi Pahanke Turredar Akadta Kyun Hai"	S. D. Batish, Shamshad Begum

The song "Meri Yaad Mein Tum Na Aansoo Bahana" is set in raga Jaunpuri.
