= Kabuliwala (1961 film) =

Kabuliwala (1961)
- Film poster
- Directed by: Hemen Gupta
- Written by: Vishram Bedekar; S. Khalil
- Based on: Kabuliwala by Rabindranath Tagore
- Produced by: Bimal Roy; Leela Desai (assoc.)
- Starring: Balraj Sahni; Usha Kiran; Sajjan; Sonu.
- Cinematography: Kamal Bose
- Edited by: Madhu Prabhavalkar
- Music by: Salil Choudhury
- Release date: 14 December 1961
- Running time: 134 minutes
- Country: India
- Language: Hindi

Kabuliwala is a 1961 Hindi film based on the 1892 short story of the same name by the Bengali writer Rabindranath Tagore. It was directed by Hemen Gupta and starred Balraj Sahni, Usha Kiran, Sajjan, Sonu and Baby Farida.

== Cast ==
- Balraj Sahni as Abdul Rehman Khan
- Sonu as Mini
- Usha Kiran as Rama, Mini's mother
- Padma
- Laxmi
- Sarita Devi
- Anwari Bai
- Leela Agha
- Baby Farida
- Asit Sen as Bhola

== Background ==
Gupta had remained private secretary to Subhas Chandra Bose, and went on to direct many films including Taksaal (1956), also starring Balraj Sahni, and his tribute Netaji Subhas Chandra Bose (1966).

== Soundtrack ==
Music – Salil Choudhury; Lyrics – Prem Dhawan, Gulzar

Music director Salil Chowdhury had composed two songs at first- Manna Dey's "Ae Mere Pyaare Watan" and a bhajan. Bimal Roy made Gulzar listen both recordings and asked his opinion. Gulzar praised "Ae Mere Pyaare Watan" but said the bhajan was not working. Bimal Roy told lyricist Prem Dhawan to rewrite the song. However, Prem Dhawan, having a packed schedule sportingly suggested Gulzar's name to rewrite the song. Then Gulzar wrote "Ganga Aaye Kahan Se". The composition of the song was adapted from Salil Chowdhury's Bengali composition "Amay Bhasaili Re".

- "Aye Mere Pyaare Watan" – Manna Dey, Lyrics by Prem Dhawan
- "Ganga Aaye Kahan Se" – Hemant Kumar
- "Kabuliwala" – Hemant Kumar, Usha Mangeshkar
- "O Ya Qurbaan" – Mohammed Rafi
