= Mera Ghar Mere Bachche =

- Directed by: Sohrab Modi
- Produced by: Sohrab Modi
- Starring: Sohrab Modi; Naaz; Subiraj; Sulochana; Sudesh Kumar
- Music by: Sardar Malik
- Production company: Minerva Movietone
- Release date: 1960
- Running time: 121 minutes
- Country: India
- Language: Hindi

Mera Ghar Mere Bachche (transl. My home, my children) is a 1960 Indian Hindi-language social family drama film produced and directed by Sohrab Modi. Made under the Minerva Movietone banner, it had music by Sardar Malik with lyrics by Hasrat Jaipuri. The film had Naaz starring in an adult lead role after previously acting as a child star. She went on to marry her co-star in the film, Subiraj. It co-starred Sohrab Modi, Sulochana, Sudesh Kumar, Subiraj, Naaz, Daisy Irani and Nana Palsikar.

The film revolves around a family with an autocratic father, who wants his two sons to follow his commands regarding their lives. The conflict created by the generational gap forms the basis of the story.

== Plot ==
Inderjit (Sohrab Modi) known as Bade Saheb lives with his wife, Parvati (Sulochana), two sons Kishor (Soodesh Kumar) and Ashok (Balraj), and an orphan girl Meena (Naaz). The family members have to follow his rigid commands, which creates a fearful atmosphere in the house. The sons' lives are laid out for them, and though Ashok does become an engineer and joins his father in business, the younger son Kishore is only interested in music, but he is unable to tell his father about it. The repressive environment makes Kishore rebel. He arrives home one night in a drunken state, only to be accosted by his father. Kishore, unable to keep silent now and letting out his frustration, tells his father about his love for music and that he is in love with Lata. Realising his son's inebriated state, Inderjit decides not to react at that time. Next morning, he orders Kishore to start work in the company as an ordinary labourer and tells his wife to send Lata home to her relatives in Nagpur. He arranges for Kishore to marry Meena. However, Narendra and Meena are in love with each other, while Kishore loves Lata. Their mother Parvati helps them marry the women of their choice. When Inderjit finds out what has transpired, he throws them out of the house and asks Parvati also to leave with the children. Inderjit is now left alone in the big house. The story then follows changing circumstances which in turn lead to a change in Inderjit's thinking.

== Cast ==
- Sohrab Modi - Indrajit(Bade Saab)
- Subiraj - Narendra
- Naaz - Meena
- Sulochana - Parvari
- Sudesh Kumar - Kishore
- Sadhana Chowdhary - Lata
- Balraj - Ashok
- Daisy Irani - Pappu
- Kavita- Lily
- Nana Palsikar

== Soundtrack ==
The music direction was by Sardar Malik and the lyricist was Hasrat Jaipuri. Mukesh, Asha Bhosle, Mohammed Rafi, Suman Kalyanpur and Seeta Agarwal provided the playback singing. Some of the notable songs were: "Chanda Ke Desh Mein", sung by Mukesh for Soodesh Kumar, "Baharon Se Poochho", sung by Mukesh and Suman Kalyanpur for Subiraj and Naaz, and Mukesh's "Ek Tum Nahin Toh Kuchh Nahin".

=== Songlist ===
#	Title	Singer
1	"Vahi Udi Udi Ghataaen Hain Ek Tum Nahin Ho To"	Mukesh
2	"Chanda Ke Des Me Rehti Ek Rani"	Mukesh
3	"Ek Tum Nahi Ho To Kuch Nahi"	Mukesh
4	"Chahe Koi Zor Laga Le"	Mohammed Rafi
5	"Mudh Mudh Ke Har Koi Dekhe Maal Me Kuch Baat Hai"	Mohammed Rafi
6	"Zulm Bhi Karte Hai Aur Kahate Hai Fariyad Na Kar"	Mohammed Rafi, Suman Kalyanpur
7	"Galiya Hai Gulzar Yaar Aaya Karo"	Asha Bhosle
8	"Pina Haraam Hai Na Pilana Haraam Hai"	Asha Bhosle
9	"Dil Mera Naache Thunak Thunak"	Mohammed Rafi, Seeta Agarwal, Suman Kalyanpur
10	"Baharo Se Puchho Mere Pyar Ho Tum"	Mukesh, Suman Kalyanpur
