= Taqrar =

- Directed by: Hemen Gupta
- Release date: 1944
- Country: India
- Language: Hindi

Taqrar is a Bollywood film. It was released in 1944.
