= Do Phool (1958 film) =

- Film poster
- Directed by: Abdur Rashid Kardar
- Written by: Johanna Spyri; Krishan Chander (dialogue)
- Based on: Heidi by Johanna Spyri
- Produced by: Mrs. Akhtar Sultana
- Starring: Baby Naaz; Master Romi; Vijaya Choudhary; Bipin Gupta
- Cinematography: Dwarka Divecha
- Edited by: Shri Anekar
- Music by: Vasant Desai
- Production company: Silverwings
- Release date: 18 August 1958
- Running time: 137 minutes
- Country: India
- Language: Hindi

Do Phool (Hindi: दो फूल, Two Flowers) is a 1958 Indian Hindi-language family drama film directed by Abdur Rashid Kardar. Adapted from the 1881 children's novel Heidi by Johanna Spyri, Baby Naaz plays the role of Poornima (Heidi). The film was produced by Akhtar Sultana Kadar with dialogues written by Krishan Chander. The music director was Vasant Desai, and the lyrics were written by Hasrat Jaipuri. The film starred Romi, Baby Naaz, Vijaya Choudhary, Bipin Gupta, Ulhas, David, Agha, and Jeevan.

The film involved a young orphan girl, Poornima, living with her grandfather in the hills. She is put to work by her aunt as a companion to a rich disabled girl, Rupa, in the city. The film focuses on the bonding between the two girls and Rupa's eventual rehabilitation.

== Plot ==
Poornima (Naaz), a young orphan girl stays with her Aunt Shankri in a village called Neecha Nagar at the foothills of Pawan Ghat. Her grandfather, Chacha Sagar (Bipin Gupta), whom she rarely meets, lives a lonely existence atop the hill in a cottage. Shankri is a greedy conniving woman, and instead of having to take care of Poornima, she leaves her with her grandfather. Here Poornima meets a young goatherd, Jaggu (Romi), who brings his goats for grazing every day and returns to his blind mother (Pratima Devi) in Neecha Nagar at sunset. Jaggu and Poornima become close friends. Shankri enters Poornima's life again, as she intends to put her in service so she can earn money. In spite of her grandfather's objections, Shankri puts Poornima to work in Seth Girja Shankar's (Ulhas) house in the city.

Poornima becomes a friend and companion to the Seth's eleven-year-old daughter, Rupa (Vijaya Choudhary). Rupa is in a wheelchair following a bout of typhoid that left her extremely weak. Rupa and Purnima become friends, which is frowned upon by Rupa's strict governess. Purnima enjoys her life with Rupa learning to read and write, but continues to pine for the mountains and greenery. A doctor is called, who advises the Seth to let Poornima return to Pawan Ghat. Jaggu is ecstatic that Poornima has returned and they wander around the hills again, but his happiness is short-lived as Rupa, who had been missing Poornima, makes her father send her to Pawan Ghat. Rupa soon starts to feel healthy with the fresh mountain air, wholesome meals, and goat's milk. One day, Jaggu, in a frenzy of jealousy due to Poornima's close friendship with Rupa, pushes Rupa's wheelchair down the hill. Rupa realises she does not need her wheelchair as she is able to move around freely.

== Cast ==
- Baby Naaz as Poornima
- Master Romi as Jaggu
- Vijaya Choudhury as Rupa
- Bipin Gupta as Poornima's grandfather, Sagar Chacha
- Ulhas as Rupa's father, Seth Girja Shankar
- Jeevan as Masterji
- Pratima Devi as Jaggu's mother
- Mumtaz Begum as Rupa's Aunt
- S. N. Banerji
- Rajan Haksar as the doctor
- Nasreen
- Amir Bano

== Crew ==
- Director: Abdur Rashid Kardar
- Producer: Mrs. Akhtar sultana
- Editing: Shri Anekar
- Cinematography: Dwarka Divecha
- Music: Vasant Desai
- Lyrics: Hasrat Jaipuri
- Choreographer: Prem Dhawan
- Sound recordist: Yeshwant Mitkar
- Art direction: G. V. Divkar

== Soundtrack ==
Asha Bhosle sang the popular number "Aayi Pari Rangbhari, Kisne Pukara" in Raga Kalavati. Music was composed by Vasant Desai with lyrics by Hasrat Jaipuri. The playback singers were Asha Bhosle, Lata Mangeshkar and Aarti Mukherjee.

=== Song list ===
Song	Singer
"Aaja Aaja, Haay Ghabraye Re"	Lata Mangeshkar
"Door Andhera Hua, Mast Savera Hua"	Lata Mangeshkar
"Tadap Tadapke Kati Umra Aashiane Mein"	Lata Mangeshkar
"Bachpan Ka Mora Tora Pyar Suhana"	Lata Mangeshkar, Asha Bhosle
"Ruthi Jaye Re Gujariya, Na Bole Re"	Lata Mangeshkar, Asha Bhosle
"Aayi Pari Rangbhari, Kisne Pukara"	Asha Bhosle
"Kanha Na Chhedo Bansuri Re"	Asha Bhosle
"Main Bezuban Hoon Panchhi"	Asha Bhosle
"Main To Cheen Ki Hoon Gudiya"	Aarti Mukherjee
