= Master Romi =

Indian actor

- Born: Mohammed Salim
- Occupation: Actor
- Notable work: Munna (1954); Hum Panchhi Ek Daal Ke (1957)

Master Romi (born Mohammed Salim) is a former Indian actor in Hindi-language films. He was best known as a child actor after his brilliant performance in K.A. Abbas's film "Munna" released in 1954. "Munna", the first songless Hindi movie was screened for a select audience including India's first Prime Minister Jawaharlal Nehru. Nehru was so moved by child star Master Romi's performance that he invited him for breakfast the next morning along with entire unit.

== Career ==
He made his screen debut in Sohrab Modi's "Jhansi Ki Rani" and later played important roles in "Shole," “Footpath," “Dil-e-Nadaan," “Paapi", "Toote Khilone" and Hum Panchhi Ek Daal Ke.

In 1958, a Hindi film adaptation called Do Phool (Two Flowers) was released based on the Swiss literary novel/ icon Heidi. The role of Heidi – called Poornima in the film – was played by Baby Naaz who was one of the most famous child stars at the time along with Master Romi.

== Filmography ==
Year	Film	Character/Role
1960	Maa Baap	Kundan
1958	Do Phool	Jaggu
1957	Yahudi	Eliza
1957	Ab Dilli Dur Nahin	Ratan
1957	Dushman	Young Ram Singh
1957	Hum Panchhi Ek Dal Ke	Rajendranath Mehra "Rajan"
1956	Ek Hi Raasta	Boy in Raja's birthday (singing "Bade Bhaiya Laya Hai")
1955	Jawab	Young Amar Kumar Dayal
1954	Munna	Munna
1954	Toote Khilone	
1953	Dil-E-Nadan	
1953	Footpath	Monu
1953	Papi	Raju's Atma
1953	Shole	
