= Munna (1954 film) =

- Directed by: K. A. Abbas
- Written by: K. A. Abbas
- Produced by: K. A. Abbas
- Starring: Master Romi; Jagdeep; Achla Sachdev; Manmohan Krishna
- Cinematography: Ramchandra
- Music by: Anil Biswas
- Production company: Naya Sansar
- Release date: 1954
- Running time: 139 minutes
- Country: India
- Language: Hindi

Munna also called The Lost Child is a 1954 Hindi social drama film produced and directed by K. A. Abbas for the Naya Sansar banner. The story was written by Abbas with photography by Ramchandra. The music director was Anil Biswas though there were no songs in the film. Master Romi played Munna and the actor Jagdeep appeared as a child artist in the film. The rest of the cast included Sulochana Chatterjee, Shammi, Tripti Mitra, Achala Sachdev, David, Manmohan Krishna, Johnny Walker, Rashid Khan and Nana Palsikar.

The film is stated to be a sequel to Abbas' debut directorial film Dharti Ke Lal (1946), especially with reference to the beginning of Dharti Ke Lal. Cited as the first Indian film produced without songs and dances, it was acclaimed as an international critical success though it failed at the box office.

A couple wants to adopt a child from an orphanage, but he escapes. His mother looks for him and the two keep missing each other. The story was later used by Chetan Anand for his film Aakhri Khat (1960).

== Plot ==
Munna (Romi) is a six-year-old boy who lives with his poor widowed mother (Tripti Mitra). In the city, the mother is finding it hard to get food for him. Finally Munna's mother, unable to fend for him, leaves him at an orphanage. Munna escapes from there to look for his mother and they cross several times only to miss each other at different places in the city. His journey results in him coming across several characters; bringing a change in their lives. The story also involves a couple who wants to adopt Munna.

== Cast ==
- Master Romi as Munna
- Jagdeep
- Sulochana Chatterjee
- Naaz
- P. Jairaj
- David
- Tripti Mitra
- Madan Puri
- Achala Sachdev
- Johnny Walker
- Shammi
- Rashid Khan
- Manju
