= Adhikar (1954 film) =

1954 Indian Hindi-language romantic comedy film

- Directed by: Mohan Sehgal
- Written by: Mukhram Sharma
- Screenplay by: Mukhram Sharma
- Story by: Mukhram Sharma
- Produced by: Anupchand Shah; Mahipatray Shah
- Starring: Kishore Kumar; Usha Kiran
- Cinematography: Jayendra Kapadia
- Edited by: Ramchandra Mahadik
- Music by: Avinash Vyas
- Production company: Rup Kamal Pictures
- Distributed by: Rup Kamal Pictures
- Release date: 1954
- Country: India
- Language: Hindi

Adhikar is a 1954 Hindi romantic comedy film directed by Mohan Sehgal starring Kishore Kumar and Usha Kiran in lead roles. It was seventh highest-grossing film of the year 1954. Usha Kiran was credited earlier in film credits than Kishore Kumar in this film.

== Cast ==
- Usha Kiran as Usha
- Kishore Kumar as Shekhar
- Yashodra Katju
- Niroo
- Bhushan

== Soundtrack ==
Lyrics were written by Prem Dhawan, Nilkant Tiwari, Deepak and Raja Mehdi Ali Khan.

Song	Singer
"Tikdambaazi, Tikdambaazi"	Kishore Kumar
"Kamaata Hoon Bahut Kuch Par Kamaai Doob Jaati Hai"	Kishore Kumar, Geeta Dutt
"Dil Mein Hamare Kaun Samaaya"	Kishore Kumar, Asha Bhosle
"Ek Dharti Hai, Ek Hai Gagan" (Part 1)	Meena Kapoor
"Ek Dharti Hai, Ek Hai Gagan" (Part 2)	Meena Kapoor
"Maati Kahe Kumbhar Se"	Shankar Dasgupta
"Degree Lekar Baithe Hai Sab"	Asha Bhosle
"Zindagi Haseen Hai"	Asha Bhosle
