= Badshah (1954 film) =

- Directed by: Amiya Chakrabarty
- Starring: Pradeep Kumar; Mala Sinha; Usha Kiran
- Music by: Shankar Jaikishan
- Production companies: Mars & Movies
- Release date: 1954

Badshah is a 1954 Bollywood drama film directed by Amiya Chakrabarty starring Mala Sinha and Pradeep Kumar in lead roles.

== Music ==
1. "Aa Nile Gagan Tale Pyaar Ham Kare" - Lata Mangeshkar, Hemant Kumar
2. "Gul Muskara Utha Bulbul Ye Ga Utha, Baghon Me Agayi Bahar" - Lata Mangeshkar
3. "Rulaa Kar Chal Diye Ik Din Hansi Ban Kar Jo Aaye The" - Hemant Kumar
4. "Jee Ghabraye Dil Jal Jaye Bedardi Ab To Aa Jaa, Saase Ruke Ghutata Hai Dam" - Lata Mangeshkar
5. "Jaage Mera Dil Soye Zamaana Mehfil DoorNahi" - Aparesh Lahiri
6. "Janam Maran Ka Saath Tum Ankh Churao To Kya, In Ankhon Ko Tumse Pyar Hai" - Lata Mangeshkar
7. "Jab Pal Bhar, Jab Pal Bhar Chain Na Paaon Re Balam, To Kaise Bitayu Din Ratiya" - Lata Mangeshkar
8. "Le Gaya, Le Gaya, Dil Le Gaya Dil Mere Sapno Me Aake" - Lata Mangeshkar
