= Talat Mahmood =

Indian singer and actor (1924–1998)

- طلعت محمود
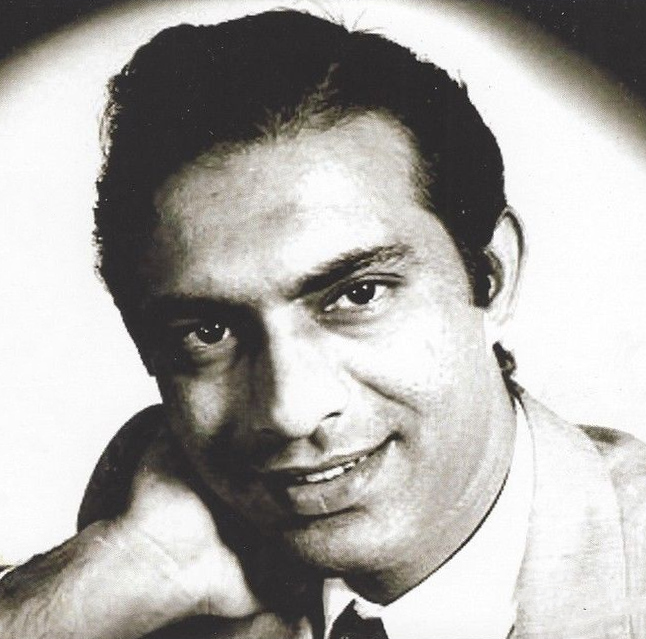
- Born: 24 February 1924; Lucknow, United Provinces, British India (present-day Uttar Pradesh, India)
- Died: 9 May 1998 (aged 74); Mumbai, Maharashtra, India
- Other name: Tapan Kumar (alias)
- Education: Bhatkhande Sanskriti Vishwavidyalaya
- Occupations: Singer, actor, composer
- Years active: 1939–1986
- Known for: Bollywood ghazals Playback singing
- Title: "Shahenshah-e-Ghazal" "The King of Ghazals"
- Spouse: Nasreen Mahmood (m. 1951)
- Children: Khalid Mahmood (son); Sabina Mahmood Rana (daughter)
- Parents: Manzoor Mahmood (father); Rafi-un-nissa Begum (mother)
- Relatives: Samir Rana (grandson); Sahar Zaman (great-grand niece)
- Honours: Padma Bhushan (1992)
- Website: talatmahmood.net

Talat Mahmood singing "Ei rim jhim jhim Boroshay"
Music composer and Lyricist Sudhin Dasgupta

Talat Mahmood (24 February 1924 – 9 May 1998) was an Indian playback singer who is considered one of the greatest and most popular Indian male film song and ghazal singers. Although he tried his luck as a film actor, he did not succeed a great deal in acting.

Talat Mahmood received the Padma Bhushan award in 1992, in recognition of his artistic contributions to cinematic and ghazal music.

He was particularly famous for singing soft and sombre ghazals in his quivering and silky voice. Romantic and tragic were the moods he liked most and he contributed a great deal in shaping the style and method of modern ghazal singing in India during the 1950s and 1960s.

== Early life ==
Talat Mahmood (Hindi: तलत महमूद; Urdu: طلعت محمود) was born in Lucknow to Manzoor Mahmood (1890 – 1955) and Rafi-un-nissa Begum. His siblings included brothers Hayat and Kamal and sisters Khalida and Laila. Talat showed his musical leanings from a very young age and would enjoy sitting through all-night music concerts.

Coming from a conservative Muslim background, singing was not encouraged. Talat had to choose between working in films and continue living at home. Despite his parents' objection, he opted for the films, though his family accepted the fact only about a decade later when he gained some respect in the Indian film industry.

== Singing career ==
Talat studied classical music under Pandit S.C.R. Bhat at Marris College of Music, Lucknow (presently Bhatkhande Music Institute) some time in the late 1930s. Talat Mahmood began his singing career at the age of 16 in 1939, when he began singing the Ghazals of Daag, Mir, Jigar etc. on All India Radio, Lucknow. His voice had a quality distinct from all the other singers. His Master's Voice was quick to notice this and offered Talat his first disc in 1941 Sab din ek samaan nahin tha, Bun jaoon ga kya se kya main, Iska to kuch dhyan nahin tha.

His reputation as a ghazal singer was not limited to his hometown of Lucknow, but it reached the city that proved to shape his destiny – Calcutta. The then famous ghazal singers were Barkat Ali Khan, K.L. Saigal and M.A. Rauf. The classical songs he sang were "Sapnon Ki Suhaani Duniyaa Ko" for film Shikast and "Laage Tose Naina" for Chaandi Ki Deewar.

In 1944, he sang the popular hit Tasveer teri dil mera behela nah sake gi. This disc brought Talat the fame throughout India and soon he was beckoned by the Calcutta film industry. Talat made cameo appearances and starred in about 16 films, for both the Calcutta (film hub of the 1940s) and Bombay Film Industry. The three films in which he starred were regional hits in Calcutta. Initially, in Calcutta, he recorded a lot of Bangla songs (basic album) under the assumed name of "Tapan Kumar".

In 1949, Talat moved to Bombay, to sing for the Hindi film industry. His big break came with the song Ae dil mujhay aisi jaga le chal composed by music director Anil Biswas, his mentor in Bombay, for the soundtrack of the film Arzoo (1950 film).

Talat helped introduce the noted playback singer Suman Kalyanpur to the music industry by recommending her to HMV after hearing her perform at a programme in 1953, marking the start of her singing career. Suman recorded her first Hindi film songs in 1954 and, in the same year, sang her first duet with Talat, "Ek Dil Do Hain Talabgaar", for the film Darwaza (1954), composed by Nashad.

Laxmikant Pyarelal composed a melodious duet with Lata Mangeshkar in 1971 film Woh Din Yaad Karo, this happened to be his last song in Hindi films. Later he was heard in an Urdu Movie, Vale-E Azam in 1987, along with Hemlata.

== Commemorative postage stamp ==
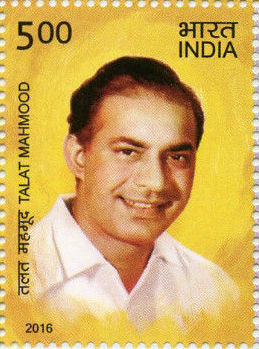
Talat Mahmood on a 2016 stamp of India

India Post issued a commemorative postage stamp to honor him in 2016.

== Acting career ==
Talat Mahmood acted in over a dozen films with actresses of the time like Nutan, Mala Sinha, Suraiya and others. Later he decided to give up acting to concentrate on singing.

Talat acted in the following Hindi films:

Year	Film name	Role	Co-star
1945	Raj Laxmi		Kananbala
1947	Tum Aur Main		Kanandevi
1949	Samapti		Bharti Devi
1951	Aaraam	A singer	Madhubala, Dev Anand
1953	Dil-e-Nadaan	Mohan	Shyama, Peace Kanwal
1954	Daak Babu		Nadira
1954	Waris	Kunwar	Suraiya, Nadira
1955	Raftaar		Nadira
1956	Diwali Ki Raat		Roopmala, Shashikala
1957	Ek Gaon Ki Kahani	A doctor	Mala Sinha
1958	Lala Rukh	Shah Murad	Shyama
1958	Maalik		Suraiya
1958	Sone Ki Chidiya	Amar	Nutan

The advent of rock-n-roll music in the late 1960s sidelined singers like Talat. As long as he was top box-office draw, the film producers insisted on including his songs in their films. Talat's velvety vocals posed a special challenge to the music-composers, most of whom leaned towards the deep baritones of Mohammad Rafi and Mukesh. The resultant demise of his film career led to the decline of his singing career. At the same time, the social changes and happiness brought about by increasing prosperity in India meant that blue mood ghazals and heart-rending ballads were not popular any more. Talat continued to record good songs, but less in number. His last soundtrack recording, in 1985, is the song "Mere Shareek-e-Safar", a duet sung with Hemlata, from the film "Wali-e-Azam" composed by Chitragupt and written by Ahmed Wasi.

Talat was one of the first Indian singers to go on foreign concert tours in 1956 to East Africa, United States, the UK, West Indies. He performed in Royal Albert Hall in London, Madison Square Garden in the United States and in the West Indies. He continued singing until 1991, when he toured the Netherlands.

== Family ==
Talat married a Bengali Christian girl from Calcutta, who also acted in films and was a great fan of his, Latika Mullick, later named Nasreen Mahmood (died March 2014), on 20 February 1951 and had two children Khalid Mahmood (27 October 1953 – 14 June 2023) and Sabina Mahmood Rana born in 1959.

== Personality ==
People, who were close to Talat, describe his nature as a quiet one. It is often remarked that he was a decent man, and his velvety and silky voice also reflected that decency and sense of calmness. Music directors, who worked with him, claimed that while listening to him, one would develop the feeling that Talat was a soft-hearted man. Dilip Kumar termed Talat as "a perfect gentleman". Veteran Indian film music director Mohammed Zahur Khayyam is reportedly quoted as saying, "He was a perfect gentleman. With him there was no loose talk. He was always well-dressed: his shoes shining and his trousers perfectly creased."

== Available work ==
Talat sang approximately 750 songs in 12 languages spread over 4 decades spanning between the 1940s and 1980s. He recorded his first song back in 1941.

== Popular singles ==
Some of his most memorable songs from Indian cinema are:

Song	Film	Year	Notes
Humse Aaya Na Gaya	Dekh Kabira Roya	1957	
Aa Chan Ve	Mutiar, Punjabi movie	1951	With Surinder Kaur
Jatta aayi basakhi faslan di mukk gayi raakhi and (he sang all songs this movie also)	Koday Shah, Punjabi movie	1953	chorus with Shaminderpal Singh, Meena Mangeshkar
Jayen To Jayen Kahan	Taxi Driver	1954	
Tasveer Banata Hoon	Baradari	1955	
Dil-E-Nadaan Tujhe Hua Kya Hai	Mirza Ghalib	1954	Duet song with Suraiya
Itna Na Mujhse Tu Pyar Badha	Chhaya	1961	Duet song with Lata Mangeshkar
Seene Mein Sulagte Hai Armaan	Tarana	1951	Duet song with Lata Mangeshkar
Aansoo Samajhke Kyon Mujhe	Chhaya	1961	
Aaha Rimjhim Ke Yeh Pyare Pyare Geet Liye	Usne Kaha Tha	1960	Duet song with Lata Mangeshkar
Sham-E-Gham Ki Kasam	Footpath	1953	
Jalte Hain Jiske Liye	Sujata	1959	
Meri Yaad Mein Tum Na Aansoo Bahana	Madhosh	1951	
Phir Wahi Sham, Wahi Gham	Jahan Ara	1964	
Ae Mere Dil Kahin Aur Chal	Daag	1952	
Zindagi Denewale Sun	Dil-e-Nadaan	1953	
Main Dil Hoon Ek Armaanbhara	Anhonee	1952	
Andhe Jahan Ke Andhe Raste	Patita	1953	
Kadale Neela Kadale	Dweep		Music By M.S.Baburaj, Malayalam film
"Lal Lal Hothwa Se"	Laagi Nahi Chhute Ram	1963	Bhojpuri Film
"Lagi Nahi Choote Ram"	Laagi Nahi Chhute Ram	1963	Bhojpuri Film
Ashqon Ne Jo Paya Hai	Chaandi Ki Deewar	1964	Music: N Dutta; Lyricist: Sahir Ludhianvi
Bechain Nazar, Betaab Jigar	Yasmeen	1955	
Raat Ne Kya Kya Khwab Dikhaye	Ek Gaon Ki Kahani	1957	
Chal Diya Karvaan, Loot Gaye Hum Yahan	Laila Majnu		
Hoke Majboor Mujhe Usne Bulaya Hoga	Haqeeqat	1964	song with Mohammed Rafi, Manna Dey & Bhupinder Singh
Aye Dil Mujhe Aisi Jaga Le Chal	Arzoo	1950	
Milte Hi Aankhen Dil Hua Deewana	Babul	1950	
Mera Jeevan Saathi Bichhar Gaya	Babul	1950	
Koi Nahin Mera Is Duniya Mein	Daag	1952	
Hum Dard Ke Maron Ka	Daag	1952	
Mohabbat Ki Kahaniyan	Woh Din Yaad Karo	1971	Melodious duet song with Lata Mangeshkar composed by Great music duo Laxmikant-Pyarelal

In his personal visit to Pakistan (East Pakistan, now Bangladesh) in 1960, he sang two beautiful Bengali songs for the film Rajdhanir Bukey directed by Ehtesham and music director Robin Ghosh in Dhaka.

Song	Film	Year	Notes
Tomare legechche etoje bhalo	Rajdhanir Bukey	1960	Lyrics: KG Mostafa
Amaar se gaan furiye gechhe	Rajdhanir Bukey	1960	

== Death ==
Talat Mahmood died on 9 May 1998, aged 74.

In 2018, an event was arranged in New Delhi to pay tribute to Talat Mahmood on his 20th death anniversary.
