= Ferry (1954 film) =

- Directed by: Hemen Gupta
- Release date: 1954
- Country: India
- Language: Hindi

Ferry, also known as Kashti, is a 1954 Indian Hindi-language film directed by Hemen Gupta. Starring Geeta Bali and Dev Anand, it was released in Bombay on 8 October 1954. A contemporary Times of India review described the film as a "gripping story" and "beautifully acted". Ferry was also positively reviewed in other publications including Filmindia and Shankar's Weekly.
