= Hemen Gupta =

Indian film director and producer

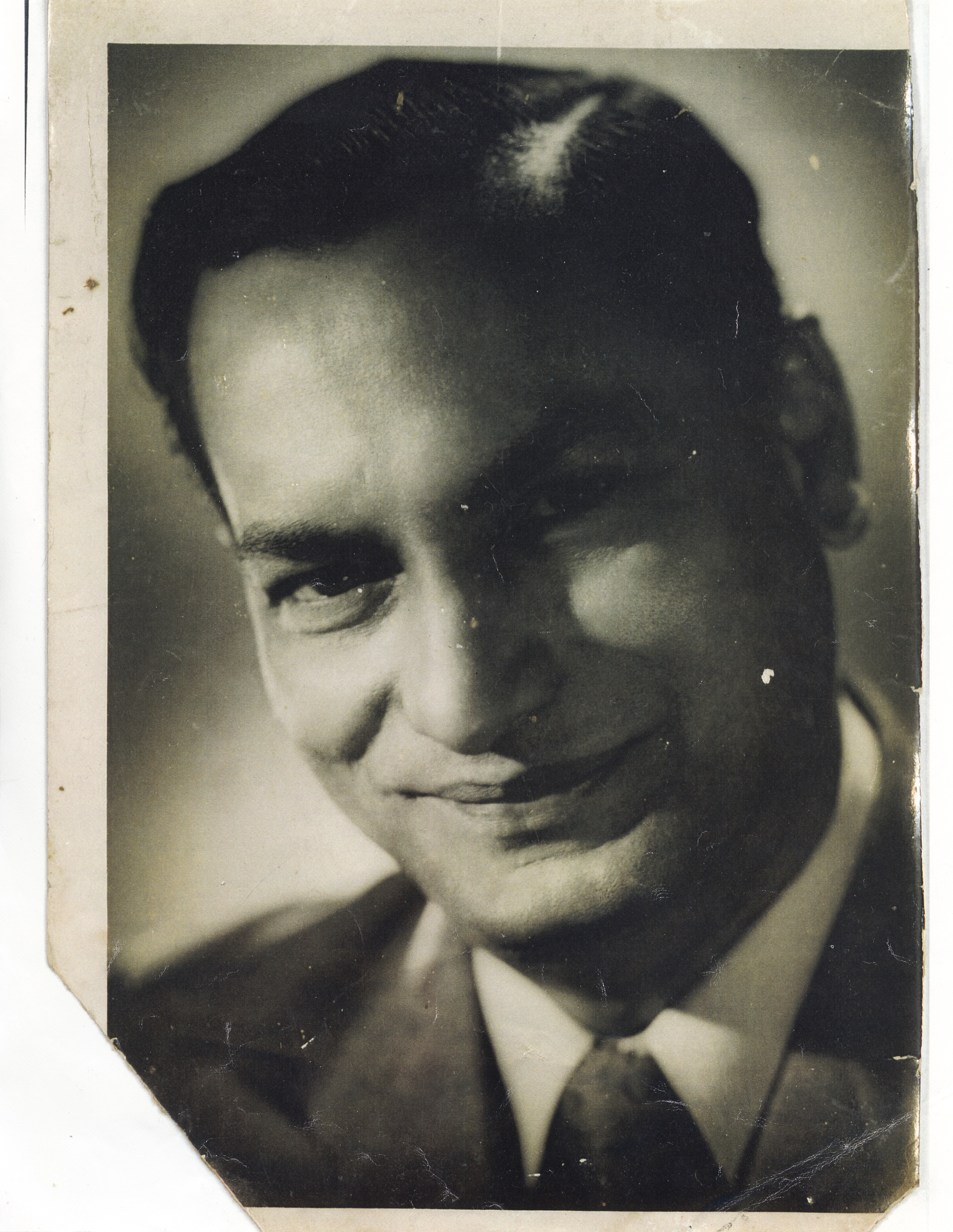
- Born: Hemen Gupta; 1914/March/21; Rajmahal, Jharkhand, India
- Died: May 1967; Mumbai, India
- Occupations: Film director, producer, screenwriter
- Years active: 1930–1967
- Known for: Anand Math (1952), Ferry (1954), Kabuliwala (1961)
- Spouse: Ratna Gupta
- Children: Son : Jayanta Gupta Daughter : Jayshree Gupta Motwane Jaijeet Gupta

Hemen Gupta was an Indian film director, producer and screenwriter in Hindi language films and Bengali language films.

== Early life ==
Hemen Gupta was born on 21 March 1914, in Rajmahal, Jharkhand, India. His father, Purnanand Gupta, worked in the State Treasury Office and for several years was posted in Dhaka, Bangladesh, where Hemen spent his early childhood. His siblings were brothers Jogen, Biren, Rabin, Nripen and sister Amiya.

Hemen grew up in a very large joint family, together with several uncles, aunts and cousins. He was a good student and completed his high school and undergrad college studies in Dhaka, where he graduated with academic honours. After his undergrad, he moved to Calcutta (now Kolkata) in West Bengal, India.

In Calcutta, he was actively involved in the national revolutionary movement to obtain freedom from British Rule. He joined the youth wing of the local Congress Party in 1928 and was drawn into what the British authorities considered subversive activities.

In 1931, he was arrested by the British police and convicted on two charges.

1. alleged complicity in the murder of the Midnapore District Magistrate, Mr. James Peddy and Robert Douglas
2. active participation in the Dacca-Assam Mail Train Robbery Case.

He spent jail terms at Hijli Jail (now part of Indian Institute of Technology, Kharagpur, West Bengal), Buxar Jail (in the state of Bihar) and Deoli Jail (in the state of Rajasthan), from 1932 to 1938. As collateral and punitive damage, his extended family also got incarcerated, whereby several members lost their government jobs and pension benefits. Also, their family printing business was forced to shut down.

== Professional life ==
His major work includes Anand Math (1952), Kabuliwala (1961).

During his jail term, he developed a keen interest in the art and science of film making, which was a new medium of mass communication in those days. While in jail, he resumed academic studies and earned his master's degree in history. Immediately upon his release from prison, he worked in close association with the India's celebrated leader Netaji Subhas Chandra Bose, as his personal secretary. In 1939 he started his film career by joining the renowned New Theatres film studios, Calcutta, as a helper in the studio's costume department. He was later promoted to becoming an Assistant Film Director.

In 1943, he got his break as a Director, with his first feature film titled “Dwanda” (Conflict). From 1943 to 1949, he directed seven feature films, mostly in Bengali language. The themes of several of his films were based on India's freedom movement and he drew upon his personal experiences as a radical activist and the years he spent in prison. Most notable amongst these films, was “42” (“Biyallish” in Bengali), Due to its controversial political content, the film was initially rejected by the Board of Film Censors, but later allowed to be released. It is widely considered to be a milestone film, depicting the Quit India Movement in a village in Bengal, India. It has won universal acclaim and continues to be a perennial favorite amongst that genre of patriotic films. In Calcutta, he introduced film actor Pradeep Kumar Batabyal, music director Hemanta Mukherjee and cameraman Ajoy Kar (who later became a film director).

In 1950, he migrated to Bombay to pursue his film career there. His first film in Bombay was produced by Mr. Sasadhar Mukerji and titled “Anand Math”. This was also a patriotic film based on a novel by the renowned Bengali author Bankim Chandra Chatterji. He also brought his protégés and key technical team from Kolkata to Bombay. His next film titled Ferry (Kashti in Hindi) in 1954, was a love story that starred Dev Anand and Geeta Bali. It was the official entry from India at the Moscow Film festival.

From 1951 to 1967, Hemen directed seven feature films that were released and three films that remained unfinished, due to his untimely demise. The most acclaimed among them was the film Kabuliwala based on a story by Nobel Laureate author Rabindranath Tagore. It was released in 1961 and it received a silver medal at the Indian National Film awards.

== Personal life ==
Hemen Gupta spent a substantial part of his youth in subversive activities in Bengal, closely tied to the freedom movement from British rule. He was later arrested by the British authorities and spent nearly 7 years in various jails. Hemen Gupta was married to Ratna Gupta in Kolkata in the early 40's. They resided in Ballygunge (a suburb in South Kolkata) with their infant son and daughter until they migrated to Mumbai in 1950/51. After graduating from St.Xavier's College, Mumbai, their daughter Jayshree (screen name Archana) acted in 3 hindi films and one bengali film before she was married and migrated with her family to USA in 1976. Their son Jayanta after graduating from IIT Delhi, pursued an engineering career and migrated to USA in 1978.

Hemen Gupta was in discussion for the position of Principal at the Film and Television Institute, Pune, Maharashtra. However he was unable to take up that position due to his prior film production commitment. He died in 1967 of a sudden brain hemorrhage while shooting for a bengali film (Anamika), which was left unfinished.

== Filmography ==
=== Director ===
Year	Film
1966	Netaji Subhash Chandra Bose (film)
1961	Kabuliwala
1960	Babar
1959	Insaaf Kahan Hai
1957	Raaj Kamal
1956	Taksaal
1954	Meenar
1954	Ferry (Kashti)
1952	Anand Math
1951	Biyallish (42)
1948	Bhuli Nai
1947	Abhiyatri
1944	Taqrar
1943	Dwanda

=== Producer ===
Year	Film
1954	Kashti
1952	Anand Math
1951	Biyallish (42)

=== Screenwriter ===
Year	Film
1956	Taksaal
1954	(Ferry) Kashti
1952	Anand Math
1951	Biyallish (42)
