= Motiram Gajanan Rangnekar =

M. G. Rangnekar
- Born: Motiram Gajanan Rangnekar; 10 April 1907
- Died: 1 February 1995 (aged 87)
- Occupation: writer

Motiram Gajanan Rangnekar (M. G. Rangnekar) (10 April 1907 – 1 February 1995) was a Marathi writer from Maharashtra, India. He received the Sangeet Natak Akademi Award (1982) for his playwriting.
