= Baadbaan =

BaadBaan
- Poster
- Directed by: Phani Majumdar
- Written by: Nabendu Ghosh; Shakti Samanta
- Screenplay by: Nabendu Ghosh; Shakti Samanta
- Story by: Phani Majumdar
- Starring: Dev Anand; Meena Kumari; Ashok Kumar; Usha Kiran; Mehmood; Leela Chitnis
- Cinematography: Roque M. Layton
- Music by: Timir Baran; S. K. Pal; Indeevar (lyrics)
- Production company: Bombay Talkies
- Distributed by: Bombay Talkies
- Release date: June 18, 1954
- Country: India
- Language: Hindi

BaadBaan (lit. 'Shelter from the storm') is a 1954 Indian Hindi-language drama film directed by Phani Majumdar and produced by the Bombay Talkies Workers' Industrial Cooperative Society Limited. Baad means storm and Baan means keeping or safeguarding. The film stars Dev Anand, Meena Kumari, Ashok Kumar and Usha Kiran in lead roles. The music score was composed by Timir Baran and S.K. Pal, the lyrics were written by Indivar and Udhav Kumar and the dances were choreographed by Shanti Bhardan. The film premiered on Friday, 18 June 1954, to packed houses at the Roxy and various other theatres in Bombay.

== Plot ==
The film depicts a story rich in incident and emotional conflict and centers on an orphaned child whose parents, fisher folk, are killed in a storm and who is adopted by a rich, kind, broad-minded philanthropist. The real drama sets in when the boy returns from England and falls in love with a lovely young socialite who reciprocates his love. On hearing of his true parentage, however, her father forbids the marriage but relents at seeing his daughter's unhappiness.

The hero's overwhelming passion for a beautiful fisher girl from the village of his birth to which he returns, bent on improving his people's lot, and his love for his charming wife make for strong emotional power climaxed tragically by the latter's death, and his returning to his roots.

== Cast ==
Dev Anand, is the hero and Meena Kumari, as his ill-starred wife, turns in a quiet, polished role in a quite difficult part. Another subtle but telling performance comes from Ashok Kumar who plays her silent lover and the hero's friend.

Usha Kiran does a gloriously rich portrayal as the fisher girl Mohnia. Bipin Gupta and Krishnakant are the hero's foster-father and the heroine's father. Jairaj, is Dev Anand's father and Leela Chitnis is his mother. The comedy is provided mainly by Gope who handles his comic and dramatic scenes very well. other actors include Shivraj and Sheikh Mukhtar.

== Songs ==
1. "Tori Preet Ke Bas Ho" - Asha Bhosle
2. "Dekho Chanchal Hai Mera Jiya Ho" - Asha Bhosle
3. "Jaati Hai, Jaati Hai Aaj Naiya Meri" - Manna Dey
4. "Jai Deva Ho Jai Deva" - Asha Bhosle, Manna Dey
5. "Har Roz Kaha, Har Roz Suna, Ek Baat Na Puri Ho Payi" - Geeta Dutt
6. "Thukra Ke Teri Dunya Ko" - Asha Bhosle
7. "Aaya Toofan" - Hemant Kumar
8. "Kaise Koyi Jiye Zeher Hai Zindagi" - Geeta Dutt

== Awards ==
- Filmfare Best Supporting Actress Award - Usha Kiran
