= Kumari Naaz =

Indian actress

- Born: Salma Baig; 20 August 1944; Bombay, Bombay Presidency, British India
- Died: 19 October 1995 (aged 51)
- Other names: Anuradha; Baby Naaz; Kumari Naaz; Naaz
- Occupation: Actress
- Notable work: Boot Polish (1954); Bidesiya (1963); Saiyan Se Neha Lagaibe (1965)
- Spouse: Subbiraj
- Children: 2
- Relatives: Kapoor family (via marriage)

Salma Baig (20 August 1944 – 19 October 1995), professionally known as Kumari Naaz or Baby Naaz, was an Indian actress who worked in Hindi- and Bhojpuri-language films. Best known for her performance in a juvenile role in Boot Polish (1954), Naaz was the highest-paid child actor in Bollywood at the time.

She later featured in a string of supporting roles in Hindi films from the 1960s to the 1980s. Naaz became one of the most popular leading ladies of Bhojpuri cinema, notably starring in Bidesiya (1963) and Saiyan Se Neha Lagaibe (1965).

Naaz was married to actor Subbiraj of the Kapoor family and had two children. She died in 1995 of a chronic liver disease.

== Early life ==
Naaz was born as Salma Baig in Mumbai in 1944. Her father, Mirza Dawood Baig, was a writer. She began working at the age of four, as her parents struggled financially. In a later interview with Stardust, she recounted that her mother was physically and mentally abusive towards her, and compelled her to work for her own comfort.

== Career ==
She started her career as a child actor in films. Her best remembered role as a child artiste was in R. K. Films’ Boot Polish (1954) and Bimal Roy's Devdas. She earned rave reviews for her earnest natural performance from The New York Times and a special distinction (along with co-actor Rattan Kumar) from Cannes Film Festival in 1955, where the film was shown in competition.

In 1958, a Hindi film adaptation called Do Phool (Two Flowers) was released based on the Swiss literary novel/ icon Heidi. The role of Heidi – called Poornima in the film – was played by Baby Naaz who was one of the most famous child stars at the time along with Master Romi.

Naaz debuted in the Bhojpuri film industry with the successful film Bidesiya (1963). Avijit Ghosh notes that she became a "sought-after Bhojpuri star" following Bidesiya, and went on to play the leading lady in many Bhojpuri films, including Saiyan Se Neha Lagaiba and Ayeel Basant Bahar (both 1965). She later transitioned to mature roles in Ganga Kinare Mora Gaon (1983). Naaz stated that she "wanted to erase the image of Baby Naaz from the audience's mind" and "enjoy[ed] working more in Bhojpuri films because there is no star system in regional films."

In Hindi films also, she later matured into a character actress and played supporting roles in films like Bahu Begum, Kati Patang and Sachaa Jhutha (where she played Rajesh Khanna's physically challenged sister).

Naaz later transitioned into a second career as a dubbing artiste. Before Sridevi started using her own voice, Kumari Naaz dubbed for her in the early Hindi hits of the 1980s.

== Personal life and death ==
She married actor Subbiraj (cousin of veteran actor Raj Kapoor) in 1965 and continued working; the two had acted together in Mera Ghar Mere Bachche (1960) and Dekha Pyar Tumhara (1963). She converted to Hinduism after marriage, renaming herself "Anuradha". The couple had two children: Girish and Gauri.

Naaz was later diagnosed with terminal illness of liver and died in 1995.

== Accolades ==
- 1955 Cannes Film Festival — Special Mention (Distinction) — She received this honour for her performance in Boot Polish (1954), along with child actor Pablito Calvo for his performance in the Spanish film Marcelino, pan y vino (1955)

== Filmography ==
Her films include:

| Year | Film | Character/Role |
|---|---|---|
| 1989 | Apna Desh Paraye Log | |
| 1989 | Pyase Nain | Dr. Bharti |
| 1986 | Bhai Ka Dushman Bhai | |
| 1986 | Sheesha | Pramila (as Naaz) |
| 1984 | Phulwari | Shobha |
| 1984 | Boxer | Mrs. Khatau (as Naaz) |
| 1982 | Bhai Aakhir Bhai Hota Hai | |
| 1982 | Swami Dada | Lallu's Wife |
| 1982 | Shriman Shrimati (as Naaz) | |
| 1980 | Bambai Ka Maharaja | Mary |
| 1978 | Kaala Aadmi (as Naaz) | |
| 1978 | Main Tulsi Tere Aangan Ki (as Naaz) | |
| 1978 | Phandebaaz | Princess Ratna |
| 1978 | Bhola Bhala | Sarla (as Naaz) |
| 1977 | Chakkar Pe Chakkar | Mrs. Babu (as Naaz) |
| 1977 | Niyaz Aur Namaaz | Sayeeda |
| 1977 | Karm | Kammo |
| 1976 | Aap Beati | Sheela Jumani |
| 1976 | Bairaag | Vimla (as Naaz) |
| 1976 | Do Khiladi | Dancer during Qawwali |
| 1975 | Do Jhoot | Vandana's Sister (as Naaz) |
| 1975 | Sanyasi | Savitri (uncredited) |
| 1975 | Sewak | Neeru |
| 1974 | Do Aankhen | |
| 1974 | Paise Ki Gudiya | Neela Gupta |
| 1974 | Woh Main Nahin | |
| 1974 | Phir Kab Milogi | Amba (as Naaz) |
| 1974 | Friend | Kalyani Sharma (as Naaz) |
| 1973 | Samjhauta | Champa (as Naaz) |
| 1973 | Raja Rani | Patron's Wife (as Naaz) |
| 1972 | Shaadi Ke Baad | Savitri B. Singh |
| 1972 | Shor | Shankar's Sister (as Naaz) |
| 1972 | Wafaa | Meera (as Naaz) |
| 1971 | Dushmun | Kamla G. Din (as Naaz) |
| 1971 | Jwala | Rajkumari Rupa |
| 1971 | Preetam | Gauri (as Naaz) |
| 1971 | Haathi Mere Saathi | Paro (as Naaz) |
| 1970 | Himmat | Banthu (as Naaz) |
| 1970 | Kati Patang | Poonam (uncredited) |
| 1970 | Sachcha Jhutha | Belu (as Naaz) |
| 1970 | Rootha Na Karo | Naina |
| 1969 | Aya Sawan Jhoom Ke | Sangeeta Y. Singh |
| 1969 | Jahan Pyar Miley | |
| 1969 | Raja Saab | Hameshbahar |
| 1968 | Juari | Princess Sabita |
| 1968 | Nadir Shah | |
| 1967 | Bahu Begum | Suraiya (as Naaz) |
| 1967 | Chhaila Babu | Meena |
| 1965 | Saiyan Se Neha Lagaibe (as Naaz) | |
| 1965 | Ayeel Basant Bahar | |
| 1964 | Baghi | |
| 1964 | Chandi Ki Deewar | |
| 1964 | Char Dervesh | Princess Hamida |
| 1964 | Hercules | |
| 1964 | Kaise Kahoon | Anita Laxmichand |
| 1964 | Majboor | Seema |
| 1963 | Bidesiya | Parvati |
| 1963 | Dekha Pyaar Tumhara | |
| 1963 | Mere Arman Mere Sapne | Shanti |
| 1963 | Mujhe Jeene Do | Chauthi Begum (as Naaz) |
| 1963 | Pyar Ka Bandhan | Sona (as Naaz) |
| 1962 | Man-Mauji | Laxmi |
| 1962 | Gangu | |
| 1961 | Ganga Jumna | Young Dhanno (as Naaz) |
| 1961 | Zindagi Aur Khwab | Rasila |
| 1960 | Dil Apna Aur Preet Parai | Munni |
| 1960 | Mera Ghar Mere Bachche | Meena |
| 1960 | Lambe Haath | |
| 1960 | Maa Baap | Pratima (as Naaz) |
| 1959 | Four Faces of India (as Baby Naaz) | |
| 1959 | Heera Moti | Roopnandan's Daughter (as Baby Naaz) |
| 1959 | Kangan | Secretary |
| 1959 | Kaagaz Ke Phool | Pramila Sinha (as Baby Naaz) |
| 1959 | Ardhangini | Dancer / Singer |
| 1959 | Bhai Bahen | Soni K. Rai (as Baby Naaz) |
| 1958 | Do Phool | Poornima (as Baby Naaz) |
| 1958 | Ghar Grihasti | |
| 1958 | Ghar Sansar | Asha |
| 1958 | Lajwanti | Renu (as Baby Naaz) |
| 1958 | Yahudi | Young Lydia (as Baby Naaz) |
| 1958 | Miss 58 | |
| 1957 | Musafir | Munni (as Baby Naaz) |
| 1957 | Payal | Padma (as Baby Naaz) |
| 1956 | Diwali Ki Raat (as Naaz) | |
| 1956 | Ek Shola | Usha (as Baby Naaz) |
| 1956 | Rajdhani | |
| 1956 | Ek Hi Rasta | Girl in Raja's birthday (singing "Bade Bhaiya Laya Hai") (as Baby Naaz) |
| 1955 | Kundan | Young Radha / Young Uma (as Baby Naaz) |
| 1955 | Lagan (as Baby Naaz) | |
| 1955 | Mast Qalandar | |
| 1955 | Patit Pawan | |
| 1955 | Raftar (as Baby Naaz) | |
| 1955 | Devdas | Young Parvati (as Baby Naaz) |
| 1955 | Hatimtai Ki Beti (as Naaz) | |
| 1954 | Chandni Chowk (as Baby Naaz) | |
| 1954 | Subah Ka Tara | Heera |
| 1954 | Boot Polish | Belu (as Baby Naaz) |
| 1954 | Shama Parwana (as Naaz) | |
| 1953 | Gunah (as Baby Naaz) | |
| 1950 | Rupaiya (as Baby Naaz) | |
