= Balmukund Dave =

Indian poet and journalist (1916–1993)

- Born: 7 March 1916; Vadodara, Bombay Presidency, British India
- Died: 28 February 1993 (aged 76); Ahmedabad, Gujarat, India
- Occupations: Poet; journalist
- Awards: Kumar Chandrak (1948)

Balmukund Dave (7 March 1916 – 28 February 1993) was an Indian Gujarati-language poet and journalist.

== Life ==
Balmukund was born on 7 March 1916 in Mustupura in Vadodara district. He completed his primary education from Mustupura-Kukarwada Gujarati Government School and the secondary education from Sayaji High School in Vadodara. After passing matriculation, he came to Ahmedabad in 1938. He worked at Sastu Sahitya Karyalaya briefly before joining Navjivan and starting journalism. After three decades of service, he retired and served as the editor of Lokjivan. He received Kumar Chandrak in 1949. He died on 28 February 1993.

== Work ==
His poetry has essence of love in form of folk tunes and spirituality in form of devotion songs.

Dhruvakhyan was his first poetry based on Dhruva, a mythological character, in medieval poetic form, Akhyana in 1948. Parikrama (1955) was his second collection of poems. His children poetry collections include Sone Champo (1959), Allal Dallak (1965) and Zarmariya (1973). Ghar ma Ganga is a collection of pen pictures of people around him. Hari no Hansalo is his Bhajan style poem dedicated to Mahatma Gandhi on his death.

== Awards ==
He received Kumar Chandrak in 1948.
