= Barkat Virani 'Befam' =

Barkat Virani
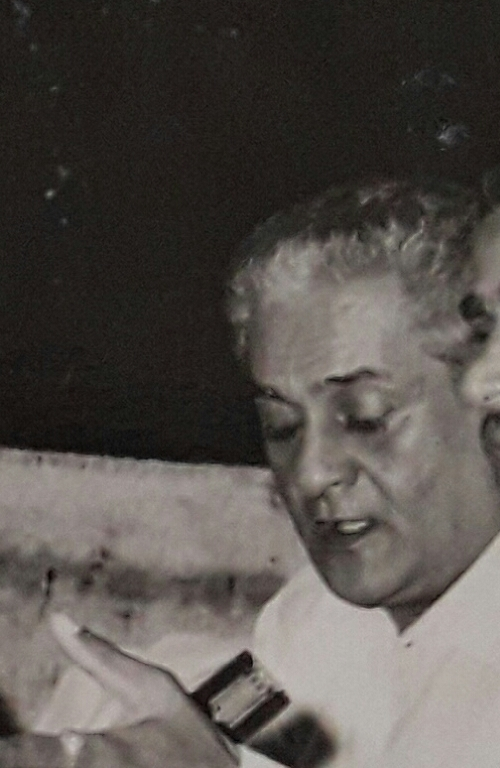
- Goregaon, 1981
- Born: Barkat Ali Ghulam Hussain Virani; 25 November 1923; Ghanghali, near Sihor, Bhavnagar
- Died: 2 January 1994 (aged 70); Mumbai
- Occupations: Poet, Novelist, Short story writer
- Spouse(s): Ruqaiyya ( 1952 - 1994), his death
- Relatives: Shayda (father in law)
- Writing career
- Pen name: Befam
- Language: Gujarati
- Genres: Ghazal, Novel, Short story
- Notable works: Ghata (1970); Pyas (1980)

Barkat Ali Ghulam Hussain Virani (25 November 1923 – 2 January 1994), popularly known by his pen name Befām, was an Indian Gujarati-language poet, novelist, short story writer and playwright. He is known for his ghazals.

== Life ==
Barkat Ali was born on 25 November 1923 in Ghanghali village near Sihor in Bhavnagar district. He was interested in literature since age of fourteen when he wrote his first ghazal. He completed his primary and secondary education from Bhavnagar. He was taught poetry by Qismat Qureshi. He left matriculation to participate in 1942 Quit India Movement. He moved to Mumbai in 1945 on suggestion of Shayda. He met Mareez there and was later employed at Aakashvani radio. He married Ruqaiyya, the elder daughter of Shayda, in 1952. He died on 2 January 1994 in Mumbai.

He was associated with Gujarati cinema. He appeared in Gujarati film Mangalfera (1949) and wrote lyrics of several film songs; Divadandi (1950), Akhand Saubhagyavati (1963), Kulvadhu (1997), Jalam Sang Jadeja, Snehbandhan.

== Works ==
He published Ghazal poetry collections; Mansar (1960), Ghata (1970), Pyas (1980), Parab. He has also written short stories, stage plays, radio plays and film songs. His several songs are popular across Gujarat such as "Nayanne Bandh Rakhine", "Thay Sarkhamni To Utarata Chhie", "Milan na Deepak Sahu Buzai Gaya Chhe". Aag Ane Ajawala (1956) and Jivta Soor are two of his Short story collections while Rangsugand parts 1-2 (1966) is a novel by him.

== See also ==
- List of Gujarati-language writers
