= Dhobi Doctor =

1954 Indian Bollywood film

- Directed by: Phani Majumdar
- Produced by: Bimal Roy
- Starring: Kishore Kumar; Usha Kiran
- Music by: Khayyam
- Release date: 1954
- Country: India
- Language: Hindi

Dhobi Doctor is a 1954 Indian Hindi film starring Kishore Kumar, Usha Kiran in lead roles.

== Plot ==
Young and smart Ramu lives with his father, who is an washerman (Dhobi) and sister Laxmi. Once Laxmi becomes ill AND dies only for the reason that there is no any doctor. Then, Ramu decides that he will be a doctor. Now after years, Ramu becomes a doctor AND falls in love with Uma.

== Cast ==
- Kishore Kumar as Ramu
- Usha Kiran as Uma

== Songs ==
Song	Singer
"Chandni Raaton Mein"	Kishore Kumar
"Aansoo Piye Teri"	Asha Bhosle
"Aaja Badli Ke Sang"	Asha Bhosle
"Pihu Pihu Bole Papihara"	Asha Bhosle
"Jhilmil Tare Neel Gagan"	Asha Bhosle
"Taron Se Ankhiyan Milaun"	Asha Bhosle
