= Shirin Mohammad Ali =

Indian actress and playback singer

- Shirin in Passing Show (1936)
- Other name: Shirin Banu
- Occupation: Actress
- Years active: 1933–1939
- Partner: Nanabhai Bhatt
- Children: 6, including Mahesh
- Relatives: Purnima (sister); Bhagwan Das Varma (brother-in-law); Bhatt family

Shirin Mohammad Ali, also referred to as Shirin Banu, was an Indian actress and playback singer who worked predominantly in Hindi-language films. Her films include Bala Joban (1934), the bilingual Hindi-Gujarati film Snehlata (1936), His Highness (1937), and Leather Face (1939), directed by Vijay Bhatt, in which she played Dulari.

Shirin was the sister of actress Purnima and was the partner of filmmaker Nanabhai Bhatt, with whom she had six children, including Mahesh and Mukesh.

== Background and personal life ==
Shirin's sister was actress Purnima, born as Meherbano Mohammad Ali, who married filmmaker Bhagwan Das Varma.

Shirin was the partner of filmmaker Nanabhai Bhatt. They had six children: four daughters, Sheila, Purnima, Kumkum, and Heena, and two sons, Mahesh and Mukesh. During his lifetime, Nanabhai insisted in media interactions that he had privately married Shirin and that his children with her therefore should not be termed illegitimate.

According to her son Mahesh, Shirin was a Shia Muslim who privately practised Islam while living with Nanabhai, a Brahmin Hindu. He recalled that she practised both Islamic and Hindu religious customs at home. He also said that she feared discrimination because of her religious identity and concealed aspects of it in public, including by giving her children Hindu names. Before her death, Shirin asked Mahesh to bury her in her mother's grave in a Shia cemetery in Byculla, Mumbai, a request he fulfilled.

Through Mahesh, Shirin is the grandmother of actresses Pooja Bhatt and Alia Bhatt.

== Career ==
Shirin began her acting career in the early 1930s, appearing in minor roles in films such as Sati Mahananda (1933), Seva Sadan (1934), and Bala Joban (1934). Although initially untrained in singing, she was taught music by Shankarrao Vyas, and subsequently sang for herself in some of her films.

She received greater recognition during this period, when she played supporting characters in the high-profile productions Bambai Ki Sethani (1935) and the Hindi-Gujarati bilingual Snehlata (1936). Shirin also appeared in the action thriller Shamsheer-e-Arab (1935) as Hasina, a gypsy dancer. A review published in Filmland described her as attractive but "little weak" in her acting performance.

Under the banner of Prakash Pictures, Shirin subsequently appeared in three action films: Passing Show and Tope Ka Gola (both 1936), followed by Challenge (1937). The Moving Picture Monthly remarked that the rise of Prakash Pictures had also brought her into prominence. Shirin continued her association with the company through His Highness (1937), Khwab Ki Duniya (1937), and State Express (1938), all of which starred Sardar Akhtar. In His Highness, however, Baburao Patel strongly criticized her performance as Akhtar's maid Kala, calling her "just awful" and disparaging her singing and dancing.

In 1939, Shirin played Dulari, a tavern girl who assists P. Jairaj's character in his fight against an oppressive warlord, in Vijay Bhatt's stunt film Leather Face.

== Filmography ==
Year	Film	Role	Source
1933	Sati Mahananda		
1934	Maharani		
1934	Seva Sadan		
1934	Vehmi Duniya		
1934	Bala Joban		
1935	Bambai Ki Sethani		
1935	Pardesi Saiyan aka Chand Ka Tukra		
1935	Shamsheer-e-Arab	Hasina	
1936	Azad Veer aka Revenge		
1936	Passing Show		
1936	Snehlata		
1936	Tope Ka Gola		
1937	Challenge		
1937	His Highness	Kala	
1937	Khwab Ki Duniya aka Dreamland		
1938	Purnima		
1938	State Express		
1939	Leather Face	Dulari	
1939	Sardar-e-Awwal aka Hero No. 1		

== In popular culture ==
In 1998, Mahesh Bhatt directed the semi-autobiographical film Zakhm, in which his daughter, Pooja, played the role based on Shirin.

The 2015 film Hamari Adhuri Kahani, directed by Shirin's grandson Mohit Suri, drew on elements of the relationship between Shirin and Nanabhai Bhatt.
