= Padma Devi =

Indian actress (1917–1983)

- শ্রীমতি পদ্মা দেবী
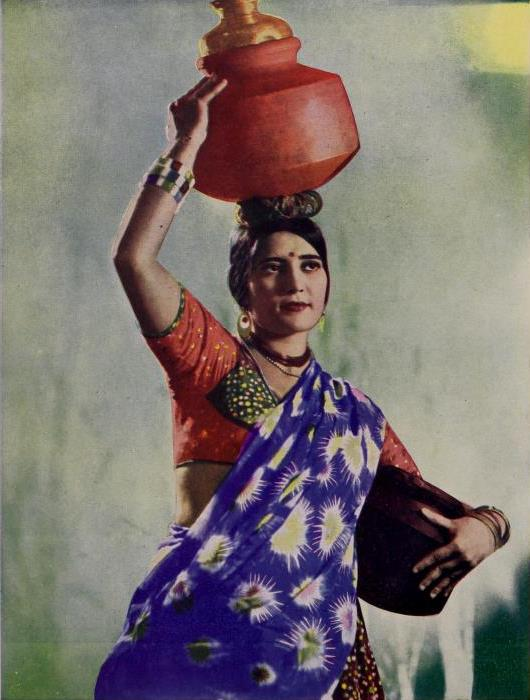
- Padma Devi in the Film Kisan Kanya (1937)
- Born: Nilima; 1917; Faridpur, present day Madaripur, Bangladesh
- Died: 1 February 1983 (aged 65–66); Calcutta, India
- Occupations: Actress; singer (in some of her early films)
- Years active: 1931–1979
- Known for: Bollywood films and music
- Notable work: Kisan Kanya (1937); Bou Thakuranir Haat (1953); Jalsaghar (1958); Bari Theke Paliye (1958)

Padma Devi (1917–1983) was a popular Indian Bengali Hindi/Hindustani Film Actress and playback singer of Indian cinema, in the silent era and the early talkies. Starting her career with the main role in Sea Goddess (1931), directed by Dhirubhai Desai and produced by Saroj Film Company, Padma went on to act in over one hundred films in her career.

== Early years ==
Padma Devi was born on 1917 in Bengal, British India. Her ancestral home was Madaripur. Her real name was Nilima.

== Career ==
Padma Devi was one of the earliest action heroines of the Indian Cinema. She started her career with Sea Goddess, filmed in 1931, and was often cast with "dare-devil" Boman Shroff in a stream of successful stunt films such as The Amazon, directed and produced by JBH Wadia, released in 1933.

In his unpublished autobiography, Jamshed Boman Homi Wadia wrote:

“I made my last silent thriller 'The Amazon' or 'Dilruba Daku' [w]ith Padma in the stellar role. The [s]tory was the reverse of 'Thunderbolt', with Padma as the masked woman and saviour of the people. Of course, I had to avail of a duplicate in female garb to enact her stunts. Even so, Padma had become an adept in fight sequences and her youth and beauty added glamour to the film. It was the box office success of 'The Amazon' which had induced me to sign Fearless Nadia in my talkies to come, with whom I was to make that super-stunt film 'Hunterwali' and take the Indian film world by storm. (Wadia 1978: ch. 43).”

Kisan Kanya starring Padma Devi is the first indigenously made color movie which was released in 1937. Her work was appreciated in movies like Chalti Duniya, Hindustan Hamara, Jini Ram Tini Krishno Ek-i Dehe Ramkrishna, Sree Sree Ramkrishna Kathamrita, Maa Bhabani Maa Amar and many more.

She has also sung in several films; Sati Mahananda (1933), Maharani (1934), Bahen Ka Prem (1935), Sangdil Samaj (1936), Kisan Kanya (1937) and Zamana (1938) are notable among them. Parallel to her Bollywood career, Padma has also worked in Bengali and Kannada language cinema.

== Filmography ==
Padma Devi acted in over one hundred films in her career. A partial list:

Year	Film	Cast	Director	Studio/Producer
1931	Sea Goddess	Padma Devi, Zebunissa, Chandra Rao Kadam, Pawar, Ata Mohammed	Dhirubhai Desai	Saroj Film Company
1932	Hind Kesari	Padma, Sultan Alam, Inamdar	Homi Master	Jayant Pictures
1932	Vanersena	Padma, Vasantrao Pahelwan, Inamdar	Homi Master	Jayant Pictures
1932	Parwana	Padma, Nure Watan, Kamla Kumari, Ram Kunwar, Rahim, Allavally, Shubi, A. Isaq, Agha, Kesari Singh	H. E. Khateeb	New Western India Film Company
1932	Toofan Mail	Yashwant Dave, Padma, Narayan Pai, Adi Patel, Manchi Thuthi, JBH Wadia	JBH Wadia	Wadia Brothers
1932	Vanraj Kesari	Navinchandra, Padma, Vasant Bhandari, Baburao Apte, Bhim, Bhagwandas, Lobo	Harshadrai Mehta	Mehta Luhar Productions
1933	Jagat Mohini	Padma, Sultan Alam, Inamdar	Homi Master	Jayant Pictures
1933	Kurukshetra	Balasaheb Yadav, Madhavrao Joshi, Padma, Nandrekar, Shlini, Sharda, Ansuya, Hansa	Sardar Balasaheb Yadav	Chhatrapati Cine
1933	Lal-E-Yaman	Padma, Mohini, Boman Shroff, Firoze Dastur, Master Mohammed, Sayani Aatish, Jal Khambata	JBH Wadia	Wadia Movietone
1933	Prithviraj Sanyogita	Padma Devi, Navinchandra, Rafiq Ghaznavi, Kishori, Altekar, Datar	Narayanrao Sarpotdar	Maharashtra Cine
1933	Sati Mahananda	Padma Devi, Mubarak, Madhukar Gupte, Shirin Banu, Shantaram, Raja Pandit, Kamlavati	Baburao Patel	Gandharva Cinetone
1933	The Amazon	Sayani, Padma, Allavally, Abul Haq, Boman Shroff, Manchi Toothy	A. H. Essa	Wadia Brothers
1933	Whirlwind	Sayani, Boman Shroff, Padma, Adi Patel, Lovji Lavangia, Josi Mehta	HBH Wadia	Wadia Brothers
1934	Baag E Misar	Padma Devi, S. Nazir, Boman Shroff, Jamna, Jal Khambatta, Firoze Dastur, Sayani Atish, Master Mohammed, Munchi Thuthi, Minoo Cooper	JBH Wadia	Wadia Movietone
1934	Bala Joban	Mubarak, Padma Devi, Shrin Banu, M. Gupte, Badri Prasad, Gulab, Madhukar Gupte, Nandu Khote, Maruti Pahelwan, Raja Pandit, Ghulam Hussain, Master Kamlakar	Baburao Patel	Gandharva Cinetone
1934	Maharani	Mubarak, Padma Devi, Shirin Banu, N. Chhapekar, Surve, Raja Pandit	Baburao Patel	Gandharva Cinetone
1935	Bahen Ka Prem	Padma Devi, Rafiqe Ghaznavi, Zohrabai, Lakshmi Narayan, Sultana, Sadiq, Azurie	J. K. Nanda	Prosperity Films
1935	Pardesi Saiyan	Mubarak, Padma Devi, Shirin, Azurie, Nandu Khote, Raja Pandit, Yasmin, Surve, Sophia, Bhaskar,	Baburao Patel	Gandharva Cinetone
1936	Chalak Chor	Ishwarlal, Padma, Dixit, Ghory, Kesari, Charlie, Rewashankar, Khatoon, Ram Apte, Shanta, Raja Sandow	Raja Sandow	Ranjit Film Company
1936	Jwalamukhi	Padma Devi, Ishwarlal, Khatoon, Shanta Devi, Ghory, Bhupatrai, Charlie	D. N. Madhok	Ranjit Film Company
1936	Passing Show	Jayant, Padma Devi, Umakant, Shirin, Jahangir, Ismail, M. Luhar, Lallubhai	Dwarka Khosla	Prakash Pictures
1936	Sangdil Samaj	Nazir, Sardar Akhtar, Padma Devi, Gope, Kamlakar, Omkar, Kamla Varekar, Sadiq Ali, Hari Shivdasani	Ram Daryani	Daryani Production
1937	Kisan Kanya	Padma Devi, Ghulam Md., Sayed Ahmed, Zilloo, Nissar, Gani	Moti Gidwani	Ardeshir Irani of Imperial Pictures
1937	Do Auratein (Two Women)	Padma Devi, Rose, Rafique Ghaznavi, Ghulam Mohammed, Baba Vyas, Sayed Ahmed, Laxmi	Moti Gidwani	Imperial Pictures
1938	Kis Liye	Mohini, Ghulam Mohammed, Padma Devi, Ghulam Rasool, Rafiqe Ghaznavi, Asuji	J. K. Mehta	Imperial Films
1938	Sharif Daku	Navinchandra, Padma Devi, Noor Jehan, Ghulam Hussain, F. M. Butt, Mukhtar, Baburao	G. R. Sethi	Jaybharat Movies
1938	Zamana	Nazir, Padma Devi, Hansa Wadkar, Dar, Majeed, Vasant, Ameena, Bansi Karnataki, Gope, Gulab	Ram Daryani	Krishna Movies
1939	Actress Kyon Bani	Usha Rani, Ashiq Hussain, Padma Devi, Rafiqe Ghaznavi, W. M. Khan, Abdul, Mukhtar	G. R. Sethi	Federal Film Exchange
1939	Kaun Kisi Ka	Shobhana Samarth, Khursheed, Padma Devi, Nazir, Mubarak, Gope, K. N. Singh, Maruti Rao, Bibijan	C. Luhar	Hindustan
1940	Chalti Duniya	Padma Devi, Rafiq Ghaznavi, Lakshmi, Ghulam Rasool, Leelavati,	Gunjal, B. Marzban	Mansukh Pictures
1940	Hindustan Hamara (Our India)	Jamuna Barua, Nandrekar, Padma Devi, Hari Shivdasani	Ram Daryani	Film Corporation of India
1941	Vasantasena	Lakshmi Bai, Subbaiah Naidu, R. Nagendra Rao, Padma Devi, Chandramma, Sarojamma, Sundaramma, Baby Vinoda, G. V. Krishnamoorthy Rao, G. R. Sandow	Ramaier Shirur	Meyappa Chettiar R. Nagendra Rao Subbaiah Naidu
1942	Bhakta Kabir	Bharat Bhushan, Mehtab, Mazhar Khan, Ramesh Sinha, Padma Devi, Vanmali Das, Gyani, Rai Mohan	Rameshwar Sharma	Unity Productions
1942	Mamta	Prince Dara, Pushpa Rani, Kalawati, Padma Devi, Akbar, N. Mohammed, Puttan	I.A. Hafizji	Indrapuri Studio
1942	Mahakavi Kalidas	Karunu Bannerjee, Chhabi Biswas, Ulhas, Menaka Devi, Padma Devi	Niren Lahiri	Motimal Theaters
1944	Sesh Raksha	Anil Chatterjee, Dipankar Dey, Sumitra Mukherjee, Santu Mukhopadhyay, Mahua Raychowdhury, Sabitri Chatterjee, Satya Banerjee, Bimal Deb, Santosh Dutta, Amit Dey, Debnath Chatterjee, Mihir Pal, Bharati Devi, Padma Devi, Aloka Ganguly, Indulekha Devi	Shankar Bhattacharya	Dilip Sarkar
1946	Khush Naseeb	Rukmini Devi, Padma Devi, Vithaldas Panchotia, Indira, Gulab, Agha	Vithaldas Panchotia	Indrapuri Studio
1947	Pagdandi	Akhtar, Om Prakash, Padma, Asha Posley, Durga Mota, Kalavat, Shyamlal	Ram Narayan Dave	Pancholi Art
1953	Bou Thakuranir Haat	Uttam Kumar, Pahari Sanyal, Sambhu Mitra, Bhanu Bandyopadhyay, Manju Dey, Naresh Mitra, Padma Devi, Nitish Mukherjee, Rama Devi	Naresh Mitra	Emar Productions
1953	Sharey Chuattor	Tulsi Chakrabarti, Molina Devi, Uttam Kumar, Suchitra Sen, Bhanu Bannerjee, Jahor Roy, Nabadwip Haldar, Gurudas Bannerjee, Padma Devi, Dhananjay Bhattacharya, Shyamal Mitra, Manabendra Mukhopadhyay, Dwijen Mukherjee	Nirmal Dey	
1954	Maa O Chhele	Chhabi Biswas, Anubha Gupta, Molina Devi, Padma Devi, Sadhona Bose	Gunamoy Bandyopadhyay	Sree Bharatlakshmi Pictures
1955	Amar Saigal	Pahari Sanyal, Tandon, G Mungeri, Akhtar Jahan, Padma Devi	Nitin Bose	Sircar Productions
1956	Saheb Bibi Golam	Sumitra Devi, Uttam Kumar, Chhabi Biswas, Nitish Mukherjee, Chhaya Devi, Padma Devi, Pahari Sanyal, Anubha Gupta, Jahar Ganguly, Bhanu Banerjee, Kanu Banerjee, Haridhan Banerjee, Nabadwip Haldar	Kartik Chatterjee	Sarkar Productions
1957	Nilachaley Mahaprabhu	Asim Kumar, Dipti Roy, Ahindra Choudhury, Dhiraj Bhattacharya, Nitish Mukhapadhyay, Kanu Banerjee, Gurudas Bandyopadhyay, Bhanu Bandopadhyay, Padma Devi, Chhabi Biswas, Sumitra Devi, Molina Devi	Kartik Chattopadhyay	Udoy Chitra Pratisthan
1958	Bari Theke Paliye (Runaway)	Kali Banerjee, Satindra Bhattacharya, Nripati Chatterjee, Shriman Deepak, Shailen Ghosh, Krishna Jaya, Param Bharak Lahiri, Gyanesh Mukherjee, Keshto Mukherjee, Padma Devi, Niti Pandit, Jahar Roy	Ritwik Ghatak	Chitrakalpa
1958	Jalsaghar (The Music Room)	Chhabi Biswas, Padma Devi, Pinaki Sen Gupta, Gangapada Bose, Tulsi Lahari, Kali Sarkar, Ustad Waheed Khan, Roshan Kumari, Begum Akhtar	Satyajit Ray	Satyajit Ray
1960	Kshudhita Pashan	Soumitra Chatterjee, Chhabi Biswas, Arundhati Devi, Dilip Roy, Padma Devi, Robin Banerjee	Tapan Sinha	Hemen Ganguly
1963	Uttar Falguni	Suchitra Sen, Bikash Roy, Chhaya Devi, Dilip Mukherjee, Padma Devi, Kalipada Chakraborty, Pahari Sanyal, Jahar Ganguli, Sita Mukherjee, Ajit Bandyopadhyay	Asit Sen	Uttam Kumar
1964	Sanjh Aur Savera	Meena Kumari, Guru Dutt, Mehmood, Shubha Khote, Manmohan Krishna, Padma Devi, Jagdev, Harindranath Chattopadhyay, Brahm Bhardwaj, Kanu Roy, Rashid Khan	Hrishikesh Mukherjee	Sevantilal Shah
1964	Kashmir Ki Kali	Shammi Kapoor, Sharmila Tagore, Padma Devi, Pran, Nazir Hussain, Dhumal, Anoop Kumar, Madan Puri, Bir Sakuja, Sunder, Mridula Rani, Tun Tun, Padma Chavan, Sujata	Shakti Samanta	Shakti Samanta
1966	Netaji Subhash Chandra Bose	Abhi Bhattacharya, Jayamala, Bipin Gupta, Padma Devi, Niranjan Sharma, Leela Misra, R. Dayal, Sudarshan Sethi	Hemen Gupta	Adarshlok
1976	Jana Aranya	Pradip Mukherjee, Kalyan Sen, Satya Bandyopadhyay, Padma Devi, Deepankar De, Arati Bhattacharya, Gautam Chakraborty, Lily Chakravarty, Bimal Chatterjee, Bimal Deb, Santosh Dutta, Utpal Dutt, Rabi Ghosh, Aparna Sen	Satyajit Ray	Indus Films (Subir Guha)
1979	Arun Barun O Kiranmala	Tarun Kumar, Dilip Ray, Master Partho, Master Supratim, Tapati Manna, Padma Devi, Nimu Bhowmik, Satya Bandyopadhyay, Alpana Goswami, Chhaya Devi	Barun Kabasi	Dolphin Films

== Last Days ==
Padma Devi died on 1 February 1983.
