= Baiju Bawra (film) =

1952 film

- Theatrical release poster
- Directed by: Vijay Bhatt
- Written by: Zia Sarhadi
- Screenplay by: R. S. Choudhury
- Story by: Ramchandra Thakur
- Produced by: Vijay Bhatt; Shankar Bhatt
- Starring: Bharat Bhushan; Meena Kumari
- Cinematography: V. N. Reddy
- Edited by: Pratap Dave
- Music by: Naushad
- Production company: Prakash Pictures
- Distributed by: Prakash Pictures
- Release date: 5 October 1952
- Running time: 155 minutes
- Country: India
- Language: Hindi
- Box office: ₹1.25 crore (equivalent to ₹147 crore or US$16 million in 2026)

Baiju Bawra (lit. 'Crazy Baiju') is a 1952 Hindi musical romantic drama film directed by Vijay Bhatt. Produced by Prakash Pictures, with story by Ramchandra Thakur and dialogues by Zia Sarhadi, Baiju Bawra was a musical "megahit" which had a mighty 100-week run in the theatres. Bhatt's decision to make a film based on classical music was met with scepticism by the Indian film industry due to its "lack of mass appeal", but the film and music turned out be an "overwhelming success".

The film's music director was Naushad, who had become popular giving folk-based music in films such as Rattan, Anmol Ghadi, Shahjehan (1946) and Deedar (1951). With Bhatt's Baiju Bawra, Naushad introduced a classical component in Hindi film songs. The soundtrack was based on classical ragas, such as Puriya Dhanashree, Todi, Malkauns, Darbari and Desi. The lyricist was Shakeel Badayuni, a Naushad discovery. For Baiju Bawra, Badayuni had to forgo Urdu, and write lyrics in pure Hindi, with songs such as the bhajan "Man Tadpat Hari Darshan Ko Aaj" becoming popular.

The film starred Bharat Bhushan as Baiju, with Meena Kumari playing his love interest Gauri. Meena made her acting debut in Bhatt's Leatherface (1939) as a six-year-old. Surendra portrayed Tansen, one of the Navratnas in Akbar's court. Kuldip Kaur played the role of the dacoit queen Roopmati. The rest of the cast included Bipin Gupta, Manmohan Krishna, B. V. Vyas and Baby Tabassum.

The film merges the legend of Baiju Bawra with the historic setting of Mughal Emperor Akbar's court in India. Baiju (Bhushan) is the son of a musician who also grows up to be a musician. He comes to believe that Tansen, the famed musician at the court of Akbar, is responsible for his father's death. The movie then follows Baiju's attempt to avenge his father's death by challenging Tansen to a musical duel.

Even though there were many changes in the storyline from the original life of Baiju Bawra, the film was both a commercial and critical success and catapulted both its lead actors into stardom. Meena Kumari became the first-ever Filmfare Best Actress Award winner in 1954, the first of four Best Actress trophies she won in her career. The film's music director, Naushad, also received the inaugural Filmfare Best Music Director Award for the song "Tu Ganga Ki Mauj"; this was Naushad's first and only Filmfare Award win. It was ranked #13 in the list of 20 greatest Indian films by BFI in 2002.

== Plot ==
Tansen is known to be the greatest classical vocalist ever to have existed in India, and was one of the nine jewels (Navaratnas) of Emperor Akbar's court. Nobody could sing in the city unless he or she could sing better than Tansen. If this was not the case, he or she was executed. Baiju Bawra is the story of an unknown singer, Baiju, who is on a mission to defeat Tansen in a musical duel to avenge the death of his father.

When Baiju is still a child, Tansen's sentry tries to stop Baiju's father from singing, and in the ensuing scuffle, his father dies. Before dying, he extracts a promise from his son to take revenge against Tansen. Baiju gets shelter from a village priest and while growing up, falls in love with Gauri, the daughter of a boatman. He continues his musical education on his own, but gets so enamoured by Gauri's love that he forgets the promise made to his father.

Later, a group of dacoits raid Baiju's village. With his song, Baiju persuades them against looting the village, but the female leader of the dacoits falls in love with him and asks him to follow them to their fort as a condition for their sparing the village. Baiju leaves with her, leaving the wailing Gauri behind. In the fort, the dacoit leader, who is actually a princess living in exile, tells Baiju how her father's fiefdom had been usurped and she was seeking revenge because the village too previously belonged to her father. The word "revenge" brings all of Baiju's memories back; he leaves the fort greatly agitated, and the princess does not try to stop him.

Baiju sneaks into the Mughal palace, where Tansen is singing. He is dumbstruck by the way Tansen sings, and the sword that was supposed to cut the maestro's throat fell on the tanpura, saddening Tansen. He said he could only be killed by music, and the pain that accompanies it. "Dip your notes in melancholy and I'll die on my own," he said. Baiju accordingly leaves the palace to learn "real" music.

Baiju remembers that when his father was killed, he was taking Baiju to Swami Haridas. He goes to see the Swami himself and asks for his guidance, informing him of his plan to take revenge against Tansen. Haridas tells Baiju that one must be in love to be a true musician, and thus Baiju must rid himself of all the hatred in his heart, but still gives him a veena and accepts him as his disciple. Baiju again starts his musical training, spending all his time in a Shiva temple, but his vengeful feelings never leave him. Nonetheless, he still reveres his guru, Haridas. After learning that his teacher had fallen seriously ill and was unable to walk, Baiju sings a song that so thrills Haridas that the master gets out of his bed and starts to walk.

Gauri, meanwhile, is so distraught over Baiju's departure that she is about to swallow poison. At that point, the princess who had taken Baiju from the village comes to her and tells her that she knows of Baiju's whereabouts. Gauri meets Baiju and tries to convince him to return to the village so they can be married; Baiju, however, refuses, as he feels he must take revenge against Tansen. At this point, Haridas arrives, and Baiju goes to receive him, once again leaving a crying Gauri behind. Haridas tells Baiju that to be a true singer, he has to feel real pain. Hearing this, Gauri decides to make a venomous snake bite her, thinking that her death would bring enough grief to Baiju that he would defeat Tansen. Baiju sees Gauri's lifeless body and goes mad, with the princess' attempts to get through to him being futile. Baiju instead goes to the Shiva temple and sings a heart-wrenching song condemning the God who had consigned him to his fate; even the idol of Lord Shiva sheds tears at Baiju's grief.

In his delirious state, Baiju reaches Tansen's city, singing the whole way. The residents fear for his life and call him bawra (insane), hence the title of the movie. Baiju is caught and imprisoned, but the princess frees him. However, both of them are caught by Mughal soldiers when escaping, leaving a musical duel with Tansen as the only way to save his life.

Emperor Akbar himself witnesses the competition. For a long time, both the singers prove to be equally good. Then Akbar suggests that whoever could melt a marble slab with his singing would win the duel. Baiju manages to do so and wins the competition, saving his own life and finally avenging his father's death. Tansen accepts his defeat graciously, and is in fact happy that there is someone better than him. Baiju persuades Akbar to spare Tansen's life, to return the princess' land to her, and to allow music in the streets.

After winning the musical duel, Baiju departs from the court. Emperor Akbar is unhappy to see him go and asks Tansen to sing to produce a storm and floods to make him stay. Tansen sings raga Megh and the river Yamuna floods. (This scene was cut from the final film.)

Meanwhile, Gauri is alive but her father is deeply upset. The entire village makes fun of Gauri's and Baiju's love affair. Her father warns her that either Baiju should be found, or Gauri should marry a village moneylender, and in case she refuses, he would commit suicide. Gauri, unwilling to divulge Baiju's whereabouts, agrees to marry the money-lender.

Discovering that she is still alive, Baiju goes to meet Gauri. On the other side of a swollen Yamuna River, Baiju is stuck. The boatmen refuse to take him to the other side. Despite not knowing how to swim, Baiju pushes the boat into the raging waters and starts rowing it. He starts singing and Gauri hears it. She starts running towards the bank. When she sees Baiju struggling with the boat, she jumps into the water to rescue Baiju. The boat topples over and after a lot of struggle Gauri manages to reach him. He urges her to go back and leave him, but Gauri replies that they had promised to be together in life and in death, and she would be content in dying with him. They both drown as the film comes to an end.

== Cast ==
- Bharat Bhushan as Baiju
- Meena Kumari as Gauri
- Kuldip Kaur as Roopmati
- Bipin Gupta as Akbar
- Manmohan Krishna as Shankaranand
- B. M. Vyas as Mohan
- Mishra as Narpat
- Radha Kishan as Ghasitkhan
- Kesari as Ganjoo
- Ratan Kumar as Young Baiju
- Baby Tabassum as Young Gauri
- Rai Mohan as Swami Haridas
- Bhagwanji as Baiju's Father
- Nadir as Hathi Singh
- Ramesh as Suhil Khan
- Krishna Kumari as Vasanti (not to be confused with the 1930s actress of the same name nor the south Indian actress T. Krishna Kumari) She was born as Rajinder Kaur in Rawalpindi, Punjab state (now part of Pakistan) on October 3, 1934
- Surendra as Tansen
- Sitaram, Tikaram, Athavale

== Production ==
=== Story and location ===
Vijay Bhatt had earlier made religious classics such as Bharat Milap (1942) and Ram Rajya (1943), with Ram Rajya being the only film Mahatma Gandhi watched. Bhatt's interest in literature and music compelled him to make a film about Tansen and the folk-legend singer Baiju Bawra as the main focus. A revenge theme was brought in with a love story and some comic interludes. Emphasis was also laid on the Guru-shishya tradition concentrating on the bond between Baiju and his Guru Swami Haridas, who was also Tansen's Guru.

Bhatt's decision to make a film based on Indian classical music was met with scepticism by the film industry due to its "lack of mass appeal", with his friends referring to him as "Viju Bawra" (Viju Crazy/Insane). Vijay Bhatt was the first to use two "classical giants on a common platform for path-breaking duets" twice. Ustad Amir Khan with Pandit D. V. Paluskar in Baiju Bawra and shehnai maestro Ustad Bismillah Khan and the innovative sitar player Abdul Halim Jaffer Khan in Goonj Uthi Shehnai.

The film was shot at Prakash Pictures studio at Andheri East in Bombay. According to Ayaz, nobody working on the sets "felt that they were working on a film that would become a milestone". The song sequence of "Tu Ganga ki Mauj" was shot at a river in Dahisar, near Bombay. The film took a year for completion.

=== Casting ===
The original choice for the cast were Dilip Kumar as Baiju and Nargis as Gauri. Bhatt's option for Bharat Bhushan and Meena Kumari in the main roles was a matter of financial deliberation and continuity of dates required for the shooting.

Meena Kumari, earlier called Mahjabeen Bano, started her acting career at the age of four in Vijay Bhatt's film Leatherface (1939). Her name was changed by Bhatt to Baby Meena in 1940. She acted in several films as a child star including Bhatt's Ek Hi Bhool (1940). Meena Kumari's first adult role was in Bachchon Ka Khel (Child's Play) (1946) directed by Raja Nene. Filmindia in the June 1946 issue, commented on her appearance "Meena Kumari, up till recently a 'baby,' now plays the charming heroine of the story". Several socials, mythologicals and fantasy films followed. In 1952, Meena Kumari "shot into stardom" following the release of Baiju Bawra. Kumari became the inaugural best actress winner at Filmfare Award for the film. The category for Best Actress was introduced by the Filmfare Awards Committee for the first time that year. Bharat Bhushan began his career in Kidar Sharma's film Chitralekha (1941) made in Calcutta. After some supporting roles, he was cast in Sohag Raat (1948) opposite Geeta Bali and Begum Para, and in Devendra Goel's Aankhen (1950). His career as a tragic hero ran parallel with that of Dilip Kumar in the 1950s, but he lacked the "intensity and charisma" of Kumar. However, his "mellow looks matched by a soft voice" had the compassion required to depict sympathetic roles, with his specialty being a "sensitive, suffering poet-musician" in several hit musicals such as Baiju Bawra, Mirza Ghalib (1954), Basant Bahar (1956), Barsaat Ki Raat (1960) and Sangeet Samrat Tansen (1962). Signed by Bhatt for Baiju Bawra, his "unruly mop and simple demeanour" established him as a star and "crystallised Bhushan's image as an actor of 'note'". The pathos required of his role was acclaimed by critics as well as audiences, as were the singing sequences of classical raga-based songs in Mohammad Rafi's voice. Bhatt and Bhushan worked again the following year in Shri Chaitanya Mahaprabhu (1953), for which Bhushan received the Filmfare Best Actor Award.

Surendra, a popular leading actor of the 1930s and 1940s, turned to character roles in the 50s. The character of Tansen in Baiju Bawra was a career-reviving role for him. One of the "greatest" highlights of the film was the music-singing competition (jugalbandi) between the court musician Tansen and Baiju. Surendra had sung his own songs in his early career, however, he had to lip-sync to Ustad Amir Khan for the song "Ghanana Ghanana Kar Barso Re" in raga Malhar, while the song sequence between Tansen and Baiju had Ustad Amir Khan and D. V. Paluskar providing playback singing for them. He played the role of Tansen in three films, Baiju Bawra, Rani Roopmati (1957) and Mughal-E-Azam (1960).

Kuldip Kaur was known for her negative characters and cited as Indian cinema's "most polished vamps". Starting her career with a Punjabi film Chaman (1948), she went on to portray female villain roles in several films. Her role as the "strong dacoit queen" who lures Baiju away from his village made a "major impact" and was critically acclaimed.

=== Music ===
Naushad had come into prominence following his fourth film Station Master (1942), a Bhatt film production. The box office success of Station Master helped Naushad showcase his talent and become popular. Naushad at this time was under contract to A. R. Kardar, who had allowed him to score music for other companies.

Bhatt brought in Naushad to give music for Baiju Bawra because of his expertise in classical music. The two worked together along with Bhatt's older brother Shankar for six months. Shankar was "opposed" to the idea of a Hindi film filled with ragas as he feared it would drive the audiences away. But Naushad and Bhatt were adamant to change "public taste" in film music and in Naushad's words "it worked". Naushad's use of classical music in Baiju Bawra helped it become one of the top ten films of the 1950s and is "remembered mostly for its music". The bandish in raga Desi between Amir Khan and D. V. Paluskar, and Khan's "Tori Jai Jai Kar" in raga Puriya Dhanashree constituted the highlights of the film. However, the solos by Mohammed Rafi "Man Tadpat Hari Darshan Ko Aaj" in raga Malkauns, "O Duniya Ke Rakhwale" in raga Darbari, "Tu Ganga Ki Mauj" in raga Bhairavi and "Insaan Bano" in raga Todi are cited as "real treasures". His composition in the film is cited as the first use of the classical medium by Naushad, but he had based a large number of his songs on Indian rāgas. In Shahjehan (1946) he had composed three classical based tunes for K. L. Saigal. He did the same in Mela 1948 and Deedar 1951.

== Soundtrack ==
Baiju Bawra

Soundtrack album by Naushad
- Released: 1952
- Genre: Feature film soundtrack

Naushad chronology
Aan (1952)	Baiju Bawra (1952)	Deewana (1952)

The plot centered around music, so it was a necessity that the movie's soundtrack be outstanding. Renowned Bollywood music director Naushad and lyricist Shakeel Badayuni created memorable songs for the movie, with all but one being based on Hindustani classical melodies (ragas). Noted playback singers Mohammad Rafi, Lata Mangeshkar, and Shamshad Begum, and renowned classical vocalists Amir Khan and D. V. Paluskar lent their voices to the score.

Amir Khan was a consultant for the music. The result was a critically acclaimed movie soundtrack. Famous songs from the movie include "O Duniya Ke Rakhwale" (based on Raga Darbari), "Tu Ganga Ki Mauj" (based on Raga Bhairavi), "Mohe Bhool Gaye Sanwariya" (based on Raga Bhairav with traces of Raga Kalingda), "Man Tarpat Hari Darshan Ko Aaj" (based on Raga Malkauns), "Aaj Gaawat Man Mero" (Raga Desi), and Jhoole Mein Pawan Ki Aayi Bahar (based on Raga Pilu). Naushad won the Filmfare Award for Best Music Director, his first and only win.

The film also established Mohammad Rafi as a top playback singer in Hindi films. The songs Rafi sang for the film, including "Man Tarpat Hari Darshan Ko Aaj" and "O Duniya Ke Rakhwale", went on to become smash hits.

All lyrics are written by Shakeel Badayuni; all music is composed by Naushad

No.	Title	Singer(s)	Length
1.	"Tu Ganga Ki Mauj Mein Jamana Ka Dhara" (Raga Bhairavi)	Mohammad Rafi, Lata Mangeshkar
2.	"Aaj Gaawat Man Mero Jhoomke" (Raga Deshi)	Ustad Amir Khan, D. V. Paluskar
3.	"O Duniya Ke Rakhwale Sunn Dard Bhare Mere Naaley" (Raga Darbari)	Mohammad Rafi
4.	"Door Koi Gaye Dhun Yeh Sunaaye" (Raga Desh)	Lata Mangeshkar, Shamshad Begum, Mohammad Rafi & chorus
5.	"Mohe Bhool Gaye Sanwariya" (Raga Bhairav with traces of Raga Kalingda)	Lata Mangeshkar
6.	"Jhoole Mein Pawan Ki Aai Bahar" (Raga Pilu)	Mohammad Rafi, Lata Mangeshkar
7.	"Man Tarpat Hari Darshan Ko Aaj" (Raga Malkauns)	Mohammad Rafi
8.	"Bachpan Ki Mohabbat Ko Dil Se Na Juda Karna" (Based on Maand)	Lata Mangeshkar
9.	"Insaan Bano" (Raga Todi)	Mohammad Rafi
10.	"Tori Jai Jai Kartaar" (Raga Puriya Dhanashree)	Ustad Amir Khan
11.	"Langar Kankariya Ji Na Maro" (Raga Todi)	Ustad Amir Khan, D. V. Paluskar
12.	"Ghanana Ghanana Ghana Garjo Re" (Raga Megh)	Ustad Amir Khan
13.	"Sargam" (Raga Darbari)	Ustad Amir Khan

== Awards ==
Year	Award	Category	Recipient	Result	Ref.
1954	Filmfare Awards	Best Actress	Meena Kumari	Won	
1954	Filmfare Awards	Best Music Director	Naushad (For the song "Tu Ganga Ki Mauj")	Won	

== Remake ==
A remake of the film tentatively titled Baiju-The Gypsy was announced in November 2010. As per the details, it was to be written, directed and produced by American-Indian writer Krishna Shah and big names like Aamir Khan and A. R. Rahman were to come together in this film but eventually, the film was shelved.

Narendra Hirawat of NH Studioz held the rights of the film's negative. It has been more than 60 years since Baiju Bawra was released and the rights have now lapsed.

In February 2019, it was reported that filmmaker Sanjay Leela Bhansali is planning a remake of this film. It will star Ranveer Singh, Alia Bhatt and Nayanthara in the lead. The shooting of this film was speculated to commence from mid-2023. However, the film shooting is now on hold.
