= Purnima (Hindi actress) =

Indian actress (1934–2013)

Purnima Das Verma
- Purnima in 1956
- Born: Meher Bano Muhammad Ali; 2 March 1932; Bombay, British India
- Died: 14 August 2013 (aged 81); Mumbai, Maharashtra, India
- Occupation: Actress
- Years active: 1947-1986
- Spouses: Syed Shauqat Hashmi (div. 1947) Bhagwan Das Varma (m. 1954; died 1962)
- Children: 1
- Relatives: Shirin Mohammad Ali (sister); Varma family

Purnima Das Varma (born Meher Bano Muhammad Ali; 2 March, 1932 — 14 August, 2013) was an Indian actress who worked predominantly in Hindi-language films. She was the aunt of director Mahesh Bhatt and grandmother of actor Emraan Hashmi.

== Personal life ==
As per her interview to film journalist and historian Shishir Krishna Sharma of Beete Hue Din blog who had interviewed her during the 2000s, Purnima was born on 2 March 1932 in Bombay (now Mumbai). Her father Ram Sheshadri Ayangar was a Tamil Brahmin who used to handle accounts at film distributor Kikubhai Desai's (father of filmmaker Manmohan Desai) office. Her mother was from Muslim family of Lucknow. Purnima had four sisters and a brother. Her elder sister, Shirin, is the second wife of filmmaker Nanabhai Bhatt and mother of directors Mahesh Bhatt and Mukesh Bhatt. During the 1930s, Shirin had worked in films viz. Bambai Ki Sethani (1935), Passing Show (1936), Khwab Ki Duniya (1937), State Express (1938) and Bijli (1939). Shirin was the person who gave the screen name 'Purnima' to Meher Bano. Meher Bano had first got married at very early age. Her first husband was a journalist named Syed Shauqat Hashmi, who moved to Pakistan during the partition of India after separating from her. Her son from this first marriage, Anwar Hashmi (father of Emraan Hashmi), acted in Baharon Ke Manzil (1968) opposite Farida Jalal. In 1954, she got married for the second time, to filmmaker, Bhagwan Das Varma, a man 25 years older than her and, who too was getting married the second time. This marriage lasted till his death in 1962. She was a close friend of Dulari, Shakila and Saira Banu. She said, "I am most proud of the fact that today my grandson (Emraan Hashmi) has become a star in front of my eyes and nothing makes me prouder than the fact that people don't know me as Purnima but instead, they know me as Star Emraan Hashmi's grandmother."

== Career ==
According to Purnima herself, filmmaker Raman B. Desai, who used to be their neighbor, had offered the role of Radha to Purnima in his Gujarati film Radheshyam, while she was still studying in school. The film was released in the year 1938 when she was 16 years old. Regarding her Hindi film career, she said Purnima, "My first Hindi film was Kidar Sharma's Thes (1948) where I was playing the second lead." However, according to the senior film historian Harish Raghuvanshi, two of Purnima's Hindi films Manager and Tum Aur Mai we're released in the year 1947 itself. Besides, in 1948, she also had acted in the Gujarati film Saavaki Maa of filmmaker Raja Yagnik. In 1949, she again worked with Raman B. Desai in the Hindi-Gujarati bilingual film Narad Muni. She, however, got her first success in Hindi films with the film Patanga (1949) where two of the songs "Dil Se Bhula Do Tum Humein" and "O Jaanewale Tune Armaanon Ki Duniya Loot Li" made her immensely popular. This film was made under the Varma Films banner, owned and founded by her future second husband Bhagwan Das Varma. then worked as a heroine and second lead in about 20 films which includes Kidar Sharma's Jogan (1950), Amiya Chakravarty's Gauna (1950) and Badal (1951), H. S. Rawail's Sagai (1951) and Shagufa (1953), Guru Dutt's Jaal (1952), B. R. Chopra's Shole (1953), Ramanand Sagar's Mehmaan (1953) and Bhagwan Das Varma's Aurat (1953) and Pooja (1954) whom, she married and temporarily bid adieu to acting in 1954. However, the financial conditions post their marriage kept detoriating and to stabilize the same, she again resumed her acting career. She said, "Our condition was such that I had to even sell my own bungalow. This was the same place where Vijay Anand's Navketan Studio stands." She said, "The second innings of my career started with the 1957 film Chamak Chandni which was a costume drama. Because my main aim was to earn money, I did whatever work that came my way. I did many good-bad films like Baghi Sipahi, Jang Bahadur, Post Box 999, Son of Sindbad (all 1958), Jawani Ki Hawa, Kangan, Madam XYZ (all 1959), College Girl, Gambler (both 1960) as the main or second lead and then slowly and steadily I just didn't realize how I had become a character artist". In dozens of films like Budtameez (1966), Humjoli (1970), Mera Gaon Mera Desh (1971), Zanjeer (1973), Khoon Pasina (1977), Main Tulsi Tere Aangan Ki (1978), Kaalia (1981), Dharam Kanta (1982), Inquilaab (1984) etc. she worked as a character artist. According to her, she worked in almost 200 films. In her later years she played a role in Ajay Devgan's debut film Phool Aur Kaante, and the role of Sanjay Dutt's on-screen grandmother, in Naam which was directed by Mahesh Bhatt. She also played the role of Amitabh Bachchan's mother, in the film Zanjeer.

== Death ==
Purnima had Alzheimer's disease during the last few years of her life and died on 14 August, 2013 at the age of 81 in Mumbai. Mahesh Bhatt later revealed on Twitter, "My aunt Purnima, the first star of our family and who happens to be Emraan Hashmi's grandmother has entered the sunset moments of her life."

== Selected filmography ==
Year	Film	Role	Notes
1947	Manager		
1948	Radheshya (Gujarati)	Radha	
1948	Saavaki Maa (Gujarati)		
1948	Thes		
1949	Narad Muni (Hindi and Gujarati)		
1949	Patanga	Purnima	
1950	Gauna		
1950	Jogan	Anjani	
1951	Badal	Maina	
1951	Sagai	Shahzadi	
1952	Jaal	Lisa	
1953	Aurat	Ruhi	
1953	Mehmaan		
1953	Shagufa		
1953	Shole		
1954	Pooja		
1956	Rajdhani	Phool Kanwar Singh	
1957	Chamak Chandni		
1958	Baghi Sipahi	Palace slave	
1958	Jang Bahadur		
1958	Post Box 999	Bindiya	
1958	Son of Sindbad		
1959	Jawani Ki Hawa	Sandhya	
1959	Kangan	Kamala	
1959	Madam XYZ		
1960	College Girl	Janaki	
1960	Gambler		
1966	Budtameez	Reeta	
1970	Humjoli	Roopa Rai	
1971	Banphool	Nirmala	
1973	Zanjeer	Sumitra Khanna	
1977	Khoon Pasina		
1978	Ganga Ki Saugand		
1978	Main Tulsi Tere Aangan Ki	Thakur Rajnath Singh Chauhan's mother	
1981	Hum Se Badkar Kaun	Radha	
1981	Kaalia	Shalini's stepmother	
1981	Khara Khota		
1981	Poonam		
1982	Dharam Kanta	Thakur Harnam Singh's wife	
1984	Inquilaab	Amarnath's aunt	
1984	Yaadgaar	Parvati "Paro"	
1986	Naam	Grandmother of Ravi Kapoor and Vicky Kapoor	Directed by nephew Mahesh Bhatt
1986	Sadaa Suhagan	Nirmala "Daayi Maa"	
1991	Phool Aur Kaante	Ajay Salgaonkar's paternal grandmother	
