= His Highness (film) =

- Directed by: Balwant Bhatt
- Starring: Sardar Akhtar; Jayant
- Release date: 1937
- Country: India
- Language: Hindi

His Highness is a 1937 Indian Hindi-language film directed by Balwant Bhatt. It features Sardar Akhtar and Jayant in lead roles, alongside a supporting cast consisting of Gulab, Shirin Banu, Umakant, and M. Zahoor.

The film was reviewed poorly by critic Baburao Patel, with major criticism directed at the story and performances of Jayant and Shirin Banu.

== Plot ==
Following the death of the King of Rajnagar, the Queen (Gulab) learns that the throne has been bequeathed not to her mentally unstable son, Pratap (Umakant), but to her young nephew, Prince Kirit (Madhav). Infuriated by the decision, the Queen begins plotting to secure the kingdom for her son.

During an outing, Captain Dilip (Jayant), the young prince's loyal bodyguard, takes Kirit into the countryside alongside their animal companions—the dog Tiger and the horse Bahadur—and servants Ram (Lekhraj) and Rahim (Chhotejan). A band of ruffians ambushes the group, knocking Dilip unconscious and abducting Prince Kirit. While Tiger pursues the kidnappers, Bahadur gallops back to alert Ram and Rahim. At the palace, the aged Prime Minister (Jal Writer), Princess Asha (Sardar Akhtar), and her maid Kala (Shirin Banu) receive news of the abduction. Overhearing the Queen scheme to frame Dilip for the crime, Kala warns the bodyguard to remain in hiding.

Tiger tracks Kirit to a remote cabin and guides Dilip to the location. Dilip, Tiger, and Bahadur fight off the captors, but the corrupt Jalim Singh manages to place Dilip under arrest. Before Jalim Singh can escape with Kirit, Ram and Rahim intervene and rescue the young prince.

Learning of the prince's survival, the Queen offers the post of Prime Minister to anyone who assassinates Kirit. However, a mysterious masked vigilante foils her plot and safely returns Kirit to the palace.

When the Prime Minister rejects the Queen's proposal to replace the missing Dilip with her loyal henchman Captain Ajaya (M. Zahoor), the masked man reappears to warn her against harming the heir. Ignoring the threat, the Queen conspires to frame the Prime Minister for treason, attempting to strip Kirit of his primary protector. With the court compromised, Princess Asha, Kala, and their loyal animals—Tiger, Bahadur, and the dog Tommy—join forces to foil the Queen's schemes and safeguard the young ruler.

== Cast ==
- Jayant as Captain Dilip, Prince Kirit's loyal bodyguard
- Sardar Akhtar as Princess Asha
- Madhav as Prince Kirit, the young heir to the throne of Rajnagar
- Gulab as the Queen
- Shirin Banu as Kala, Princess Asha's maid
- Umakant as Pratap, the Queen's mentally unstable son
- Jal Writer as the Prime Minister
- M. Zahoor as Captain Ajaya, a loyal follower of the Queen
- Lekhraj as Ram, a palace servant
- Chhotejan as Rahim, a palace servant

The film also featured animal performers:

- Dog Tiger as Tiger, the loyal dog
- Dog Tommy as Tommy, the dog
- Horse Bahadur as Bahadur, the horse
