= Paluskar =

Paluskar can refer to:

- Vishnu Digambar Paluskar (1872–1931), Hindustani singer, known for bhajan
- D. V. Paluskar (1921-1955), Hindustani classical vocalist
