= 1st Filmfare Awards =

1954 awards for Hindi cinema

- Date: 21 March 1954
- Site: Metro Cinema, Bombay
- Hosted by: David

Highlights
- Best Film: Do Bigha Zamin
- Most awards: Baiju Bawra & Do Bigha Zamin (2)

The 1st Filmfare Awards were held on 21 March 1954, honoring the best in Hindi cinema in 1953.

That year they were known as the Clare Awards, after Clare Mendonça, a film critic of The Times of India who had died in the same year.

The films Baiju Bawra & Do Bigha Zamin won two awards each, with the former winning Best Actress (for Meena Kumari) and Best Music Director (for Naushad for ''Tu Ganga Ki Mauj''), and the latter winning Best Film and Best Director (for Bimal Roy), thus becoming the most-awarded films at the ceremony.

Dilip Kumar won the first of his eight Best Actor awards for his performance in Daag.

== Awards ==
In a short ceremony held at Metro Cinema in Bombay (now Mumbai), awards in only 5 categories were handed out. The chief guest of the function was George Allen, US Ambassador to India. The ceremony was compared by actor David, and it started with actress Nalini Jaywant singing the national anthem. This was followed by song and dance performance by various actors, musical performances by Talat Mehmood, Geeta Roy and Mohammed Rafi. Next two performances were classical dance performances by Vyjayanthimala and Surya Kumari. The finale of the performance section was a folk-dance performance, "Lure of Rajasthan" by Kamini Kaushal and her troupe.

This led to the section where David announced the awards. No nominations were announced, just the winners. Keep with the voting process, where the readers of the magazine, decided the winners through postal votes, even the awards were given away by readers, chosen via a lucky draw. For example, the Best Film trophy was given by Ambassador Allen to a reader, Saijuddin from Hyderabad, who in turn presented it to Bimal Roy. This was followed by Best Actress which was won by Meena Kumari for Baiju Bawra and Best Actor went to Dilip Kumar for Daag. Next, ace music director Naushad won his first and only Filmfare Award, for Best Music for Baiju Bawra. The final award, the Best Director was won by Bimal Roy, present by Sonny Cordiero, a reader from Mumbai.

Incidentally, Bimal Roy and Dilip Kumar were the first winners of Best Director and Best Actor respectively, and remained almost 6 decades later, the ones with the most wins in either category, with 7 and 8 awards respectively. Additionally, Meena Kumari, who was the first winner for Best Actress, held the record for the most wins in the category (4) for 13 years, till her record was broken by Nutan with her 5th win at the 26th Filmfare Awards. Fearing similar mob of fans as outside Metro Cinema, the venue of the award party was not announced publicly. Later, around hundred invitees gathered at Wellington Gymkhana Club.

Hollywood star Gregory Peck was invited to be the guest of honour at the awards but could not make it to the function since his flight from Colombo got delayed. However, Peck did attend the after-party banquet that followed the award night at Wellington Gymkhana Club, Mumbai.

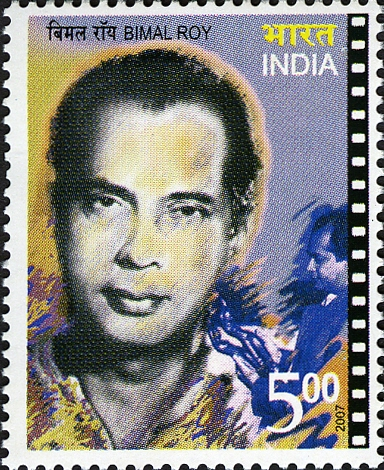
Bimal Roy, Best Director

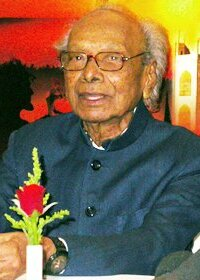
Naushad, Best Music Director

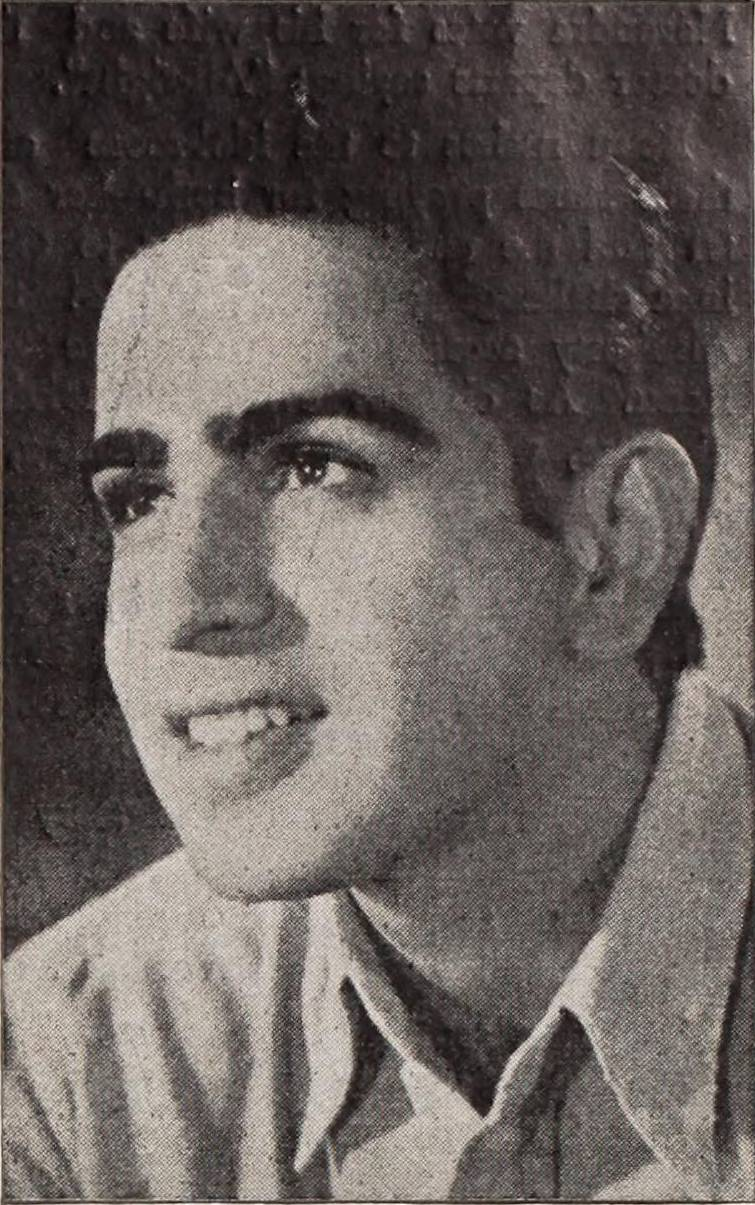
Dilip Kumar, Best Actor

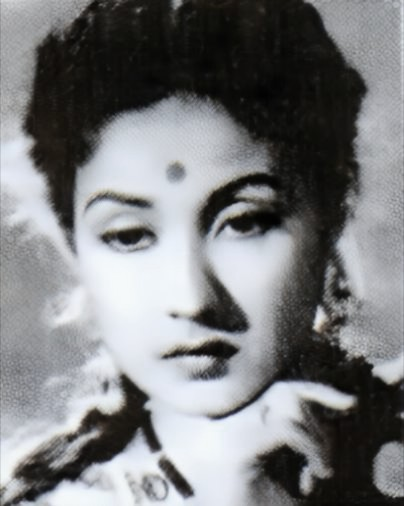
Meena Kumari, Best Actress

Best Film
Do Bigha Zameen – Bimal Roy Productions
Best Director	Best Music Director
Bimal Roy – Do Bigha Zameen	Naushad – Baiju Bawra for Tu Ganga Ki Mauj
Best Actor	Best Actress
Dilip Kumar – Daag as Shankar	Meena Kumari – Baiju Bawra as Gauri

== Superlatives ==
The following films had multiple wins

Movie	Awards
Baiju Bawra	2
Do Bigha Zameen	2

== See also ==
- 2nd Filmfare Awards
- Filmfare Awards
