= Khwab Ki Duniya =

- Directed by: Vijay Bhatt
- Produced by: Vijay Bhatt
- Starring: Jayant; Sardar Akhtar; Umakant; Zahur
- Music by: Lallubhai Nayak
- Production company: Prakash Pictures
- Release date: 1937
- Running time: 155 minutes
- Country: India
- Language: Hindi

Khwab Ki Duniya (transl. Dreamland) is a 1937 Hindi fantasy film produced and directed by Vijay Bhatt for Prakash Pictures. The music director was Lallubhai Nayak with lyrics written by Pandit Anuj. The film starred Jayant, with costars Sardar Akhtar, Umakant, Zahur, Lallubhai, Shirin Mohammad Ali and Ismail.

Khwab Ki Duniya was inspired by the film The Invisible Man (1933) based on H. G. Wells novel of the same name. The film marked the "directorial debut" of Vijay Bhatt.

== Cast ==
- Jayant
- Sardar Akhtar
- Shirin Banu
- Umakant
- Zahur
- Madhav Marathe
- Ismail

== Production ==
The film had elaborate special effects with the invisible man being the main draw. Babubhai Mistry trained as a special effects director with Vijay Bhatt when they worked together and was acclaimed as a "trick scene photographer" for his work in Khwab Ki Duniya and for his work in Hatim Tai (1956) for Homi Wadia's Basant Pictures. The use of the black thread (Kaala Dhaaga) for the special effects scenes in Khwab Ki Duniya earned him the moniker of "Kaala Dhaaga".

== Soundtrack ==
The lyrics of the film were written by Pandit Anuj with music composed by Lallubhai Nayak. The singers were Rajkumari, Ranjit Rai, Shirin Mohammad Ali, Ismail Azad and Lallubhai Nayak.

=== Song list ===
#	Title	Singer
1	"Aao Aao Pran Pyare Sansar Ek Naya Basayein"	Rajkumari
2	"Chhayi Aayi Sawan Ki Ghata Bagh Mein"	Ranjit Rai, Shirin
3	"Kali Kali Par Hai Bhamar, Man Kaahe Lalchaaye"	Rajkumari
4	"Bhaj Le Bhaj Sundar Naam Murari"	
5	"Duniya Saari Ek Khwab Hai Jhoothi Uski Maya"	
6	"Neend Nahin aave Jiya Na Chain Pave"	
7	"Sanwariya Tori Banki Chaal Mohe Pyari Laage"	Ismail Azad, Lallubhai Nayak
8	"Preet Ki Reet Nahin Pehchanat Kyun Banta Hai"	Shankarrao Khatu
9	"Hajamaat Hai Duniya Mein Yari Dotarfa"	Ismail Azad, Lallubhai Nayak
