= Leather Face =

- Poster
- Directed by: Vijay Bhatt
- Produced by: "Vijay-Shankar" Bhatt
- Starring: P. Jairaj; Mehtab; Jal Writer; Shirin Mohammad Ali
- Music by: Lallubhai Nayak; Shankar Rao Vyas
- Production company: Prakash Pictures
- Release date: 1939
- Running time: 166 minutes
- Country: India
- Language: Hindi

Leather Face, also known as Farzand-e-Watan, is a 1939 Indian Hindi-language action film produced and directed by Vijay Bhatt for his production company Prakash Pictures. Bhatt cast the young Mahjabeen, then six years, who went on to become the famous actress, Meena Kumari. The story writers were Batuk Bhatt and Sampatlal Srivastava. The music direction was by Lallubhai Nayak and Shankar Rao Vyas with the lyrics written by Pandit Anuj. It starred P. Jairaj, Mehtab, Jal Writer, Shirin Mohammad Ali, M. Zahur, Lallubhai Nayak, Bholaram and Baby Mahjabeen (Meena Kumari).

Leather Face, cited as one of Bhatt's successful "stunt" films along with State Express made a year earlier, had features similar to it. The use of a masked protagonist (Jairaj), the dog Tiger, and the stunts made the film popular with the public.

== Plot ==
A state chieftain (M. Zahur) rules over his people in a despotic manner. Samar (P. Jairaj) becomes the hero-bandit to fight the chief. He dons a leather mask, and along with the help of his dog Tiger and horse Bahadur he ventures out to set things right. He also has the help of a group of wayfarers, and Dulari (Shirin Mohammad Ali), the inn-keeper. Samar falls in love with the Chieftain's sister Ila (Mehtab). Following several action scenes, Samar is able to rid the state of its tyrannical ruler and marry Ila.

== Cast ==
- P. Jairaj as Samar
- Mehtab as Ila
- Jal Writer
- Shirin Mohammad Ali as Dulari
- M. Zahur
- Baby Mahjabeen (Meena Kumari)
- Lallubhai Nayak
- Munshi Khanjar
- Bholaram
- Putli
- Faizy

== Meena Kumari ==
Leather Face is also famous for being Meena Kumari's debut role. Meena Kumari was just a six-year-old when her father Ali Bux brought her to Vijay Bhatt, who cast her as Baby Mahjabeen in the film. In the film she plays the daughter of actor Jairaj. She was later to play a lead role opposite him as his lover in the film Magroor (1950)

== Review And Box Office ==
According to Rajadhyaksha and Willemen Leather Face, along with State Express made a year earlier was one of the "best Known" of Bhatt's "stunt" films, doing well at the box office.

== Soundtrack ==
The music was composed by Lallubhai Nayak and Shankar Rao Vyas, with the lyricist being Pandit Anuj.

=== Song list ===
#	Title
1	"Dheere Dheere Jaat Wohi Prem Naiya"
2	"Aaye Nahin Chitchor Ban Upvan Chhayi Hariyali"
3	"Kis Ki Ada Se Chalte Hain"
4	"Phulwari Mere Desh Ki Phoolon Se Hai Bhari"
5	"Lo Waade Bahari aayi Azaad Hue Sab Bhai"
6	"Raahe Wafa Mein Mar Mit Jao"
