= Snehlata (1936 film) =

- Directed by: Balwant Bhatt
- Produced by: Vijayshankar Bhatt
- Starring: Jayant; Gulab; Panna; Umakant; Rajkumari; Shirin Banu; Lalobhai
- Music by: Lallubhai Naik
- Production company: Prakash Pictures
- Release date: 1936
- Country: India
- Languages: Gujarati, Hindi

Snehlata, also known as Bharat Ki Devi, is a 1936 Gujarati and Hindi language film directed by Balwant Bhatt and produced by Vijayshankar Bhatt.

== Plot ==
Successful businessman Sudhakar who falls in love with a college girl Snehlata. The love-story progresses in a love triangle and ends in a tragedy.

== Cast ==
The cast is as follows:

- Jayant
- Gulab
- Panna
- Umakant
- Rajkumari
- Shirin Banu
- Lalobhai
- Jai Writer

== Production ==
When talkie films were started, Balwant Bhatt and Vijayshankar Bhatt established Prakash Pictures. Following success of Sansarleela (1934), they produced black-and-white film Snehlata in Gujarati as well as Hindi.

== Soundtrack ==
=== Hindi ===
Snehlata/Bharat Ki Devi

Soundtrack album by Lallubhai Naik
- Released: 1936
- Genre: Feature film soundtrack
- Language: Hindi
- Label: Saregama

All lyrics are written by Vijayshankar Bhatt; all music is composed by Lallubhai Naik.

Track listing
No.	Title	Singer(s)	Length
1.	"Sambhal Kar Rakh Kadam"	Rajkumari Dubey
2.	"Tum Ho Kisi Ke Ghar Ke Ujale"	Rajkumari Dubey
3.	"Moorakh Man Bharmane"	Rajkumari Dubey
4.	"Hey Dhanya Tu Bharat Naari"	Rajkumari Dubey

=== Gujarati ===
The songs of Gujarati version of film had become popular. "Tame Mara Devna Didhel Chho" was written Jhaverchand Meghani and had become popular. The soundtrack is as follows:

All lyrics are written by Raghunath Brahmabhatt; all music is composed by Lallubhai Naik

Track listing
No.	Title	Singer(s)	Length
1.	"Vishay Premna Panth Jagatma"	Rajkumari Dubey
2.	"Tame Mara Devna Didhel Chho"	Rajkumari Dubey	3:11
3.	"Tame Harya Amari Chhe Jeet Mano Ne Tame Man Ghela"
4.	"Bharan Panghatava Akeli May Gai Ree"
5.	"Palpal Amari Ankhathi Aaghaa Kadi Jasho Nahi"
6.	"Aavo Naseeb Ajamavava Khulla Amara Dwar Chhe"
7.	"Madhura Sandeh Kaink Lave Jeevan Jagaveshi"
8.	"Surana Shuddha Premine Badha Raspan Ochha Chhe.."	Lallubhai Naik, Ismail
9.	"Sahu Sahuni Mastima Baheni Mast Bani Sahu Dole"	Rajkumari Dubey
10.	"Kya Chhe Musafir Sukh Jagatma Fogat Fanfa Mare"
11.	"Kyare Nazar Pade E Murti Mruduta Bhari"
12.	"Hai Aaj Jagat Tu Tyagi Thai Amar Puri Anuragi"	Rajkumari Dubey

== See also ==
- List of Gujarati films
