= Netaji Subhash Chandra Bose (film) =

- Directed by: Hemen Gupta
- Based on: Life of Subhas Chandra Bose
- Starring: Abhi Bhattacharya; Padma Devi; Kamal Kapoor
- Cinematography: Surendra Sinha
- Distributed by: Adarshlok
- Release date: 1966
- Running time: 150 min
- Country: India
- Language: Hindi

Netaji Subhash Chandra Bose is a 1966 Hindi biographical drama film directed by Hemen Gupta based on the life of Indian nationalist leader Subhas Chandra Bose. This film was released in 1966. This is the last film directed by Hemen Gupta.

== Plot ==
The film portrays the life of Indian revolutionary Subhas Chandra Bose from his early life, involvement in India's freedom movement to formation of Indian National Army with the support of the Axis powers during the Second World War.

== Cast ==
- Abhi Bhattacharya as Netaji
- Kamal Kapoor
- Bipin Gupta
- Padma Devi
- Leela Misra
- Niranjan Sharma
- Rajeshwar Dayal
- Sudarshan Sethi
- Soni Chatterjee
- Kant Kumar
- Paresh Kumar
- Munshi Niyamatulla
- Kishan Raj
- Mohan Kaul

== See also ==
- Subhas Chandra
- Netaji Subhas Chandra Bose: The Forgotten Hero
