= Jawani Ki Hawa =

1959 film

- Directed by: M. Sadiq
- Written by: M. Sadiq
- Produced by: P. N. Arora
- Starring: Pradeep Kumar; Vyjayanthimala
- Music by: Ravi
- Release date: 1959
- Country: India
- Language: Hindi

Jawani Ki Hawa is a 1959 Hindi film directed by M. Sadiq. It stars Pradeep Kumar, Vyjayanthimala, Johnny Walker in the lead roles.

== Plot ==
In a Bombay bound Mail Train, Lata (Vyjayanthimala) a spirited girl, playing hide and seek with the T.T.E. on the running train encounters Chand (Pradeep Kumar) a destitute graduate who is made to pay her fare and part with almost all the money he has. Reaching Bombay, their misadventures culminate in court, and they are charged as vagabonds. Lata using her wits gets their acquittal and they part in pursuit of their respective goals. Time marches on, Chand fails to find a job and falls victim to a hoax by Dhakosla (Johnny Walker) and is compelled to part with all his belongings, including his coat. In this vicissitude, Chand is spotted by an eccentric millionaire, Banarasidas (Badri Prasad), who sends him on a wild goose chase with the temptation of wealth if he finds and brings to him his long lost child, Sandhya. Incidentally, Chand again meets Lata, now rolling in money and luxury. She asks him to stay with her, but he gets suspicious of her means of achieving so much in such a short time and declines her offer. The same night, Chand encounters Dhakosla again, who dreading the wrath of the hoax he played uses his wits and takes Chand to Shankar Dada's (Raj Mehra) place with whom he himself is staying as an uninvited guest. Early in the morning, Chand awakens to the vibrations of the music and his inquisitiveness brings him face to face with Lata, in the process of a film shooting. Chand realises the folly of his doubts and he is reconciled. Lata invites them all over to her place for dinner, and there a new doubt creeps into Chand. That Lata might be the lost child of Banarasidas. His attempt to establish the identity turns adverse and loses Lata's love and confidence. Not long afterwards, Chand finds himself entangled in a gang of child lifters and there finding Sandhya (Purnima) rescues her and hastens to Banarasidas weaving a rosy and bright future for the poor girl and himself. His whole dream is shattered when the father learns that Sandhya is soon to become the mother of a child and refuses to accept her back. Chand brings her back to the slums but the people label Sandhya as a Wanton woman and reject her. Chand revolts at the degradation of humanity and man made law and proclaims Sandhya as his wife to be, Lest the love for Lata may not deviate him from his determination, he along with Sandhya leaves Bombay. Lata, learning of Chand's sacrifice and the purpose of his sudden departure pursues them and persuades him to return to Bombay, as she would stand by him in this noble cause and as an elder sister to Sandhya unite them in wedlock.

== Cast ==
- Pradeep Kumar as Chand
- Vyjayanthimala as Lata
- Johnny Walker as Dhakosla
- Purnima as Sandhya
- Raj Mehra as Shankar dada
- Anwar Hussain as Badri
- Helen as Dancer

== Soundtrack ==
Film's music is scored by Ravi, film songs lyrics are by Rajinder Krishan and Shailendra.

Song	Singer	Lyricist
"Jare Jaa Mera Dil Na Jala"	Mohammed Rafi	Rajinder Krishan
"Chali Kaisi Yeh Jawani Ki Hawa"	Asha Bhosle	Rajinder Krishan
"Lo Woh Aa Gaye, Jeete Thay Hum Jinke Liye"	Asha Bhosle	Rajinder Krishan
"Babu Re, Babu Re Gharib Ki Hoon Chhokri"	Asha Bhosle	Rajinder Krishan
"Yeh Raat Sitaronwali"	Asha Bhosle	Rajinder Krishan
"Chanda Ke Paas Ek Tara"	Asha Bhosle	Shailendra
"Kaun Jane Re Baba Duniya Mein Peer Parai, Duniya Mein Peer Parai"	Mohammed Rafi, Geeta Dutt and Asha Bhosle	Shailendra
