= Banphool =

- Theatrical release poster
- Directed by: Vijay Bhatt
- Written by: Qamar Jalalabadi; Moosa Kaleem (dialogues)
- Screenplay by: Dhruv Chatterji
- Story by: Arun Bhatt
- Produced by: Harish Upadyaya; C.D. Shah
- Starring: Jeetendra; Babita; Shatrughan Sinha
- Cinematography: Pravin Bhatt
- Edited by: Nand Kumar
- Music by: Laxmikant–Pyarelal
- Production company: Filmlands
- Release date: 7 January 1972
- Running time: 137 minutes
- Country: India
- Language: Hindi
- Budget: ₹48 lakh
- Box office: ₹1.89 crore

Banphool is a 1972 Indian Hindi-language romance film, produced by Harish Upadyaya and C.D. Shah under the Filmlands banner and directed by Vijay Bhatt. Starring Jeetendra, Babita and Shatrughan Sinha in the leads. Its music was composed by Laxmikant–Pyarelal. The film did not do well commercially.

== Plot ==
Haria lives with his widowed and elderly grandmother on a tea estate. He works there as a mahout, or elephant driver, alongside his elephant friend, Raja. After meeting and falling in love with Gulabi, a gypsy girl, the couple plans to marry. However, Gulabi also attracts the attention of Ajay, the tea estate owner's only son. When Ajay discovers Gulabi's feelings for Haria, he plots to eliminate Haria. Ajay attempts to abduct Gulabi but fails when Haria intervenes with Raja. In the ensuing struggle, Ajay shoots Raja, killing him. Enraged, Haria seeks revenge against Ajay, but Ajay's father intervenes. Later, Ajay's father discovers a secret about his past and decides to alter his will. Upon learning of this, Ajay confronts his father with a shotgun, ready to kill him and anyone else who opposes him.

== Cast ==
- Jeetendra as Haria
- Babita Kapoor as Gulabi
- Shatrughan Sinha as Ajay
- Asrani as Vaidyaraj Tej Bahadur
- Ramesh Deo as Jagdish
- Durga Khote as Haria's maternal grandma
- Kanhaiyalal as Muninji
- Sunder as Panchhilal
- Hari Shivdasani as Radhakant
- Kamaldeep as Jagga
- Purnima as Nirmala
- Seema Deo as Janki
- Shabnam as Munim's Wife
- Rirkoo
- Laxmi Patel as Chamki

== Soundtrack ==
Lyrics by: Anand Bakshi

#	Title	Singer(s)
1	"Main Jahan Chala Jaoon"	Kishore Kumar
2	"Ho Tara Tera Mera"	Kishore Kumar, Lata Mangeshkar
3	"Main Aaj Chaloon Aise"	Lata Mangeshkar
4	"Aahen Na Bhar Thandi Thandi"	Lata Mangeshkar
5	"Gulabi Gulabi Aankho Se"	Mohammed Rafi
6	"O Sapno Ke Raja"	Mohammed Rafi, Lata Mangeshkar
