= M. Zahoor =

Indian actor in Hindi films

- Other name: Zahoor Ahmed
- Occupation: Actor
- Years active: 1930–50

M. Zahoor, also written as M. Zahur or Zahoor Ahmed, was an actor known for playing villains in Hindi films in India during 1930s and 40s. He was the maternal uncle of the Indian actress-singer, Suraiya, and was instrumental in her getting entry into Hindi films in Bombay. In 1941, he took her to the sets of the movie Taj Mahal, where she was spotted by the director of the film, Nanubhai Vakil, who selected her to play the role of the young Mumtaz Mahal. Zahoor also wrote the story of the film 1857 (1946), starring Suraiya and Surendra. He migrated to Pakistan along with his mother (who was also Suraiya's maternal grandmother) later after India's independence.

== Films ==
Some of the films in which he acted are the following:

=== Silent films ===
- Khooni Katar (1931)
- Farebi Daku (1931)

=== Talkies ===
- State Express (1938)
- Leatherface aka Farzande Watan (1939)
- Hero No. 1 (1939)
- Hukum Ka Ikka (1939)
- Alaudin Laila (1941)
