= Memdidi =

- Directed by: Hrishikesh Mukherjee
- Written by: Sachin Bhowmick (story); Hrishikesh Mukherjee (screenplay); Rajinder Singh Bedi (dialogue)
- Produced by: L. B. Lachman
- Starring: Jayant; Lalita Pawar
- Cinematography: Jaywant Pathare
- Music by: Salil Choudhury
- Release date: 1961
- Country: India
- Language: Hindi

Memdidi is a 1961 Hindi film produced by L. B. Lachman and directed by Hrishikesh Mukherjee. The film stars David, Jayant, Lalita Pawar, Asit Sen and Tanuja. The film's music is composed by Salil Choudhury. Hrishikesh Mukherjee also directed its remake of the film titled Achha Bura in 1983, replacing Jayant with Jayant's son Amjad Khan.

== Cast ==
- Lalita Pawar as Mrs. Roy
- David as Bahadur Singh
- Jayant as Sher Khan
- Tanuja as Rita
- Kaysi Mehta as Dilip
- Asit Sen

== Music ==
1. "Main Jaanti Hoon" – Lata Mangeshkar, Mukesh
2. "Raato Ko Jab Neend Udd Aaye" – Lata Mangeshkar
3. "Beta Wah Wah Waw Mere Kaan Mat Khaao" – Lata Mangeshkar
4. "Bhula De Zindagi Ke Gham" – Lata Mangeshkar
5. "Bachpan O Bachpan Pyare Bachpan" – Lata Mangeshkar
6. "Ham To Ghar Me Chulha Phuke" – Lata Mangeshkar, Mahendra Kapoor
