= Sardar Akhtar =

Indian actress (1915–1986)

- Still shot from the film Asra (1941)
- Born: 1915; Lahore, Punjab Province, British India
- Died: 2 October 1986 (aged 70–71); New York City, U.S.
- Resting place: Badakabarastan, Mumbai, India
- Occupation: Actress
- Years active: (1933 – 1945); (1971 – 1973)
- Spouse: Mehboob Khan (m. 1942–1964) (until Mehboob Khan's death)

Sardar Akhtar (1915–1986) was an Indian actress who worked in Hindi and Urdu films. She started her acting career on the Urdu stage.

Her early films were with Saroj Movietone, where she did a majority of stunt (action) roles. She came into prominence as the washer-woman in the role of Rami Dhoban in Sohrab Modi's Pukar (1939). As a woman seeking justice for the death of her husband, it was a breakthrough role for her. A popular song she sang in the film was "Kaheko Mohe Chhede". Her career defining role was as a "peasant woman" deserted by her husband, in Mehboob Khan's Aurat (1940), a role later made famous by Nargis in Mehboob's remake Mother India.

She acted in over 50 films in a career span of 1933–45. Akhtar married Mehboob Khan in 1942, whom she had met when he cast her in Ali Baba (1940). She stopped acting after completing films like Fashion (1943) and Rahat. Then she resumed acting as a character actress in the 1970s, when she acted in O. P. Ralhan's Hulchul (1971).

== Early life ==
Akhtar was born in 1915, in Lahore, British India. She started as a supporting "dancer-artiste" and commenced her film career by acting in stage plays produced by Madan Theatres Ltd.

== Career ==
Akhtar started her career at Saroj Movietone doing what were then termed as "stunt" films. She acted in films directed by A. P. Kapoor (Anand Prasad Kapoor) like Roop Basant, Id Ka Chand, Malti Madhav, all in 1933. Some of the action films she did at Saroj were directed by J. P. Advani (Jagatrai Pesumal Advani), including Gafil Musafir, Johare-Shamsheer, Shah Behram and Tilasimi Talwar. In 1934, she acted in Hothal Padmini directed by Kanjibhai Rathod.

In 1935, Akhtar acted in Delhi Express, directed by Madanrai Vakil. In 1936, she starred with K. L. Saigal in the farcical-comedy Karodpati. The comedy was a rare departure from Saigal's normally serious films. Akhtar played a masked avenger in Vijay Bhatt-directed State Express (1938). It was stated to be a "successful film," doing well at the box office. The main draw was a "performing gorilla" and Sardar Akhtar's songs and performance. It was cited by Rajadhyaksha and Willemen as one of the "best stunt films" from Bhatt, who normally made mythologicals.

In 1939, Sardar Akhtar was cast because of her natural earthy looks in Sohrab Modi's Pukar as the washer-woman Rami Dhoban. Her husband has been accidentally killed by an arrow shot by Empress Nur Jahan. Rami demands justice of Emperor Jehangir, evoking his tenet "A life for a life". Akhtar's role was appreciated by the public and the critics; it was a turning point in her career — from doing stunt roles to big production socials.

1940 had Akhtar working in Ali Baba. The film was directed by Mehboob Khan, someone Akhtar had been trying to meet for some time. It co-starred Surendra and Waheedan Bai and turned out to be a commercial success. A relationship started between Mehboob and Akhtar during the making of Ali Baba, with the two marrying on 24 May 1942.

Aurat (1940), directed by Mehboob Khan for National Studios, is referred to as "one of the best classics of Hindi cinema". Described as a "powerful predecessor of Mother India", The role displayed Akhtar's acting potential fully, and her "interpretation of the mother figure" was lauded. Akhtar described it as her favourite film performance.

Pooja in 1940 was termed as a "thundering success" by Baburao Patel in his review. Produced by National studios and directed by A. R. Kardar, the review title described it as "Kardar Produces The Best Picture Of The Year". The story, inspired by The Old Maid (1939) by Warner Pictures, was about sisters played by Akhtar and Sitara Devi. Akhtar was commended for performing her role with sincerity.

== Personal life ==
Sardar Akhtar, Bahar (Mrs. A. R. Kardar), Rita Carlyle, Naseem Banu, and Flo Gubby

Sardar Akhtar was the older sister of Bahar Akhtar, also an aspiring actress. During their debut together opposite A. R. Kardar in his film Qatil Katar, Bahar and Kardar eloped. Production was halted and, ultimately, Bahar stopped working in films.

Mehboob Khan had approached Akhtar through her brother-in-law Abdul Rashid Kardar. Akhtar then met Mehboob Khan during the making of Alibaba and the two entered into a relationship, which culminated in their marriage on 24 May 1942. This was Mehboob's second marriage.

Though Akhtar stopped working after 1945, she was, as stated by Mehboob, his inspiration for making films like Aan (1952), Andaz, and the remake of Aurat: Mother India (1957). Fond of watching films, her favourite actors were Bette Davis, Norma Shearer, Vivien Leigh, and Charles Boyer.

== Death ==
Sardar Akhtar died on 2 October 1986, following a heart attack in New York City, US. Mehboob and Akhtar had no children. According to a major film website of India, "Akhtar was a foster mother to Sajid, who acted the role of Briju in her husband's film Mother India".

After Mehboob's death in 1964, she became his legal heir, with shares in Mehboob Studios and three flats. The property went into litigation once Akhtar's nephew made forgery claims regarding Akhtar's will. The two-decade old dispute is still pending.

== Filmography ==
List:

Year	Film	Director	Co-stars	Studio
1933	Id Ka Chand	A. P. Kapoor (Anand Prasad Kapoor)	Ashraf Khan, Zebunisa	Saroj Movietone
1933	Malati Madhav	A. P. Kapoor	Ashraf Khan, Gulab, Zebunisa	Saroj Movietone
1933	Roop Basant	A. P. Kapoor	Ashraf Khan, Gulab, Zebunisa	Saroj Movietone
1933	Naqsh-e-Sulemani a.k.a. Tilasmi Taveez	A. P. Kapoor	Jani Babu, Zebunisa	Saroj Movietone
1933	Husn Ka Gulam	J. P. Advani (Jagatrai Pesumal Advani)	Ashraf Khan, Gulab, Zebunisa	Paramount
1934	Johar-e-Shamsheer a.k.a. The Feats Of The Sword	J. P. Advani	Nissar, Jani Babu Zebunisa	Saroj Movietone
1934	Gafil Musafir a.k.a. Careless Traveller	J. P. Advani	Ashraf Khan, Ghulam Mohammed, Prabhashankar	Saroj Movietone
1934	Tilasmi Talwar a.k.a. Magic Sword a.k.a. Shaif-e-Sulemani	Nanubhai Desai	Ashraf Khan, Zebunisa, Gulab	Saroj Movietone
1934	Hothal Padmini	Kanjibhai Rathod	Ashraf Khan, Zebunisa	Saroj Movietone
1934	Ajamil	A. R. Kabuli	Ashraf Khan, Zebunisa	Saroj Movietone
1934	Dilara	J. P. Advani	Ashraf khan Zebunisa, Ebrahim	Hindustan Cine
1934	Jaan Nissar	Kanjibhai Rathod	Sultana, Jani Babu, Zebunisa	Sarla Cinetone
1935	Shah Behram	J. P. Advani	Zebunisa, Master Nissar, Dulari, Jani Babu	Saroj Movietone
1935	Farebi Duniya	J. P. Advani	Zebunisa, Navin Yagnik	Golden Eagle
1935	Misar Ka Khazana	Rajhans	Zebunisa, Master Nissar, Ganpat Bakre, Jani Babu	Saroj Movietone
1935	Dharma Ki Devi a.k.a. Religious Woman	Hiren Bose	Kumar, feroze Dastur, Hari Shivdasani, Rafiq Ghaznavi	Eastern Arts
1935	Delhi Express	Madanrai Vakil	Zohra, Ghulam Farid, Master Mohan, Roshan Ara	Roshanare
1936	Piya Ki Jogan a.k.a. Purchased Bride	Hiren Bose	Pramod Chandra, Asha Lata, Krishna Kumari	Golden Eagle
1936	Pratima	Ram Daryani	Nazir, Gope, Indu Kumari	Daryani Productions
1936	Prem Bandhan	C. N. Lala	Sitara Devi, Benjamin, Putli	Golden Eagle
1936	Sangdil Samaj	Ram Daryani	Nazir, Gope, Padma Devi, Omkar Devaskar, Hari Shivdasani	Daryani Productions
1936	Sher Ka Panja	Dwarka Khosla	Nazir, Gope, Yasmin, Omkar Devaskar, Hari Shivdasani, Asha Lata, Gope	Eastern Arts
1936	Fida-E-Watan a.k.a. The Patriot	G. R. Sethi	Indu Rani, Gope	Daryani Productions
1936	Karodpati a.k.a. Millionaire	Hemchandra Chunder	K. L. Saigal, Pahari Sanyal, Trilok Kapoor, Molina	New Theatres Ltd
1937	Bismil Ki Arzoo	B. S. Higle	Ramola, Noor Jehan, Mirza, Tara	U. P. Cinetone
1937	Khwab Ki Duniya	Vijay Bhatt	Jayant, Shirin Banu, Umakant, Madhav Marathe	Prakash Pictures
1937	His Highness	Balwant Bhatt	Jayant, Gulab, Shirin	Prakash Pictures
1938	State Express	Vijay Bhatt	Jayant, Shirin Banu, Umakant	Prakash Pictures
1938	Poornima	Balwant Bhatt	Ranjit, Gulab, Badriprasad, Noor Jehan, Umakant	Prakash Pictures
1939	Pukar	Sohrab Modi	Chandra Mohan, Naseem Banu, Sohrab Modi	Minerva Movietone
1940	Ali Baba	Mehboob Khan	Surendra, Wahidan, Ghulam Mohammed	Sagar Movietone
1940	Aurat a.k.a. Woman	Mehboob Khan	Surendra, Yakub, Jyoti	National Studios
1940	Bharosa	Mehboob Khan	Chandra Mohan, Naval, Sheela	Minerva Movietone
1940	Pooja a.k.a. Worship	A. R. Kardar	Sitara Devi, Zahur Raja, Jyoti	National Studios
1941	Aasra	Lalit Mehta	Husn Banu, Amar, Veena	National Studios
1941	Nai Roshni	Chimankant Gandhi	Husn Banu, Meena Kumari, Kanhaiyalal	National Studios
1942	Ghar Sansar	Vishnu Vyas	Jehanara Kajjan, Mazhar Khan, Nazir	Sunrise Pictures
1942	Uljhan a.k.a. The Dilemma	N. R. Acharya	Mazhar Khan, Anjali Devi	Acharya Art
1942	Phir Milenge	Sohrab Modi	Meena Shorey, K. N. Singh, Sohrab Modi	Minerva Movietone
1942	Duniya Ek Tamasha a.k.a. The World's A Show	Dwarka Khosla	Urmila, Gope, W. M. Khan	Saubhagya Pictures
1943	Masterji	Krishna Gopal	Harish, Veena Kumari, Pande	Raja Movies
1943	Fashion	S. F. Hasnain	Chandra Mohan, Sabita Devi, Bhudo Advani	Fazil Bros.
1945	Rahat	Ramnik Desai	Jairaj, Indira, Kanhaiyalal	Kirti Pictures
1971	Hulchul	O. P. Ralhan	Kabir Bedi, Sonia Sahni, Helen	O. P. Ralhan
1973	Bandhe Haath	O. P. Goyal	Amitabh Bachchan, Mumtaz, Kumud Chhugani	O. P. Ralhan
