= Seva Sadan (film) =

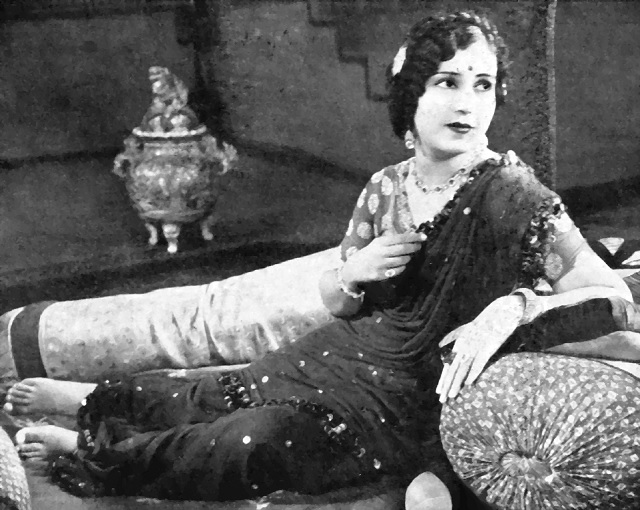
- Zubeida in a publicity still for Seva Sadan
- Directed by: Nanubhai Vakil
- Based on: Bazaar-e-Husn by Premchand
- Produced by: Mahalakshmi Cinetone
- Starring: Zubeida; Shahu Modak; Jaddanbai; Shirin Banu
- Music by: Dinkarrao Bidkar
- Release date: 1934
- Country: India
- Language: Hindi

Seva Sadan is a 1934 Indian Hindi-language film directed by Nanubhai Vakil, and produced under the banner of Mahalakshmi Cinetone, which was co-founded by Vakil and actress Zubeida. An adaptation of Premchand's Urdu novel Bazaar-e-Husn, the film stars Zubeida and Shahu Modak, with supporting characters played by Jaddanbai and Shirin Banu. The music for the film was composed by Dinkarrao Bidkar.

Premchand was not impressed with the screen adaptation of his novel; a telegraphic message records him as describing Seva Sadan as a "Fair, but not satisfactory" attempt.
