= Achha Bura =

- Directed by: Hrishikesh Mukherjee
- Written by: Sachin Bhowmick
- Screenplay by: Hrishikesh Mukherjee; D.N. Mukherjee
- Produced by: Deepak Parashar
- Starring: Raj Babbar; Anita Raj
- Cinematography: Jaywant Pathare
- Edited by: Khan Zaman Khan
- Music by: Usha Khanna
- Release date: 17 September 1983 (India)
- Country: India
- Language: Hindi

Achha Bura (transl. The Good and the Bad) is a 1983 Indian Bollywood film directed by Hrishikesh Mukherjee and produced by Deepak Parashar. The film was a remake of Memdidi, directed by Hrishikesh Mukherjee again. The film starred Raj Babbar and Anita Raj. It also had Amjad Khan, Ranjeet and Dina Pathak in pivotal roles.

== Cast ==
- Raj Babbar...Ravi Lala
- Anita Raj...Rita Roy
- Amjad Khan...Mohammad Sher Khan / Kamalrup Chaurasiya "Shera"
- Ranjeet...Veer Singh / Vinay Sinha "Veer"
- Dina Pathak...Rosy
- Hari Shivdasani...Lala
- Viju Khote...Jaggu Dada
- Utpal Dutt...Dwarkaprasad Maniklal Chaurasiya

== Soundtrack ==
All songs composed by Usha Khanna with lyrics written by Rajendra Krishan and Indeevar.

1. "Aa Jaao Yahaan" - Asha Bhosle
2. "Kya Aisa Ho Sakti Hai" - Asha Bhosle and Suresh Wadkar
3. "Socha Nahin Achha Bura" - Jagjit Singh and Usha Mangeshkar
4. "Tum Bhi Hanso" - Anwar and Suresh Wadkar
