= Mubarak (actor) =

Indian character actor and film director

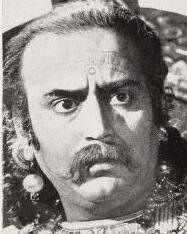
- Mubarak in the film Veer Kunal
- Born: Mubarak Merchant; 30 January 1909; Bombay, Bombay Presidency, British India
- Died: 26 July 1986 (aged 77); Bombay, Maharashtra, India
- Other name: Moby
- Occupations: Actor; Film director
- Years active: 1929–1975

Mubarak (born Mubarak Merchant; 30 January 1909 – 26 July 1986) was an Indian film director and actor, who played character roles in Hindi cinema from early 1930s to mid 1970s.

== Personal life ==
Mubarak was born in an affluent family of Bombay on 30 January 1909 and was fondly called "Moby" by his friends. Mubarak was the son of a construction engineer but was orphaned at a young age. He later grew up in a Parsi household. After attending St. Xavier High School and later St. Xavier College, he made his film debut with Pati Patni in 1929.

A popular and respectable figure of the film industry, not much is known about his personal life. He retired from his career in the mid-1970s and died on 26 July 1986. He was 77.

== Career ==
Mubarak started his career at the age of twenty with Chandulal Shah's Pati Patni. Throughout the 1930s and 1940s, Mubarak continued to appear in a string of films which included Vasal ki Raat (1930), Noor Jahan (1931), Sati Mahananda (1933) and Maharani (1934). The talkies brought newer opportunities for Mubarak when he learned the correct diction and fundamental tricks of voice control under the guidance of English actor and playwright Grant Anderson. A slew of box office successes followed for Mubarak, who, by the late forties, has been a part of films like Kangan, Naya Sansar, Kismet, Tansen (in which he portrayed Emperor Akbar), Zaban, Manorma, Tadbir and Shabnam.

His stately visage and regal bearing made him an apt choice to play Gangadhar Rao in Sohrab Modi's costume drama Jhansi Ki Rani. Later that year, he reprised his role of Akbar in the 1953 film Anarkali followed by Nagin which had him portraying a Nagi chieftain. Raj Kapoor starrer Phir Subha Hogi, Main Nashe Mein Hoon, Dev Anand's Maya, Jab Pyar Kisi Se Hota Hai, Yash Chopra's Waqt, B. R. Chopra's Humraaz are some of his memorable films. His last film appearance was in Shyam Benegal's film Nishant (1975) after which he left the film industry and retired.

== Selected filmography ==
Mubarak appeared in more than a hundred films, some of which are listed below

- Pati Patni
- Gori Bala
- Vasal Ki Raat
- Bar Ke Pobar
- Blood Feuds
- Namak Haram Kaun
- Dilawar
- Nur Jahan
- Veer Kunal
- Sati Mahananda
- Josh-E-Inteqam
- Pardesi Saiyaan
- Banarsi Thug
- Aakhri Galti
- Aurat Ka Dil
- Noor-E-Islam
- Nari Raj
- Prem Laksha
- Talismi Hira
- Sheila
- Kal Ki Baat
- Saathi
- Sitara
- Bala Joban
- Maharani
- Jeevan Natak
- Humari Betiyan
- Kangan
- Kon Kis Ka
- Bahurani (Also director)
- Naya Sansar
- Kanchan
- Shobha
- Usha Haran
- Fariyaad
- Aage Kadam
- Bhaktaraj
- Ujala
- Mata
- Ek Raat
- Kismet
- Tansen
- Zabaan
- Manorama
- Pannadai
- Tadbir
- Riwaaj
- Renuka
- Maang
- Rim Jhim
- Shabnam
- Sheesh Mahal
- Samadhi
- Nadaan
- Madhosh
- Stage
- Anarkali
- Jhansi Ki Rani
- Shama Parwana
- Nagin
- Prabhu Ki Maya
- Abe Hayat
- Heer
- Anjaan
- Champakali
- Begunah
- Farishta
- Phir Subha Hogi
- Night Club
- Hum Hindustani
- Main Nashe Mein Hoon
- Shola Aur Shabnam
- Jab Pyar Kisi Se Hota Hai
- Maya
- Yeh Dil Kisko Doon
- Waqt
- Chhoti Chhoti Baten
- Aaye Din Bahar Ke
- Hamraaz
- Ek Nanhi Munni Ladki Thi
- Barkha Bahar
- Nishant
