= Karodpati =

- Directed by: Hemchander Chander
- Produced by: New Theatres
- Starring: K. L. Saigal; Sardar Akhtar; Pahari Sanyal; Molina Devi
- Music by: R. C. Boral; Pankaj Mullick
- Production company: New Theatres
- Release date: 1961
- Country: India
- Language: Hindi

Karodpati (also called Millionaire) is a Hindi 1936 comedy film directed by Hemchander Chunder. The film was produced by New Theatres Ltd. Calcutta, and the music was composed by R. C. Boral with the assistance of Pankaj Mullick. The lyrics were written by Kidar Sharma who also acted in the film. The film starred K. L. Saigal, Sardar Akhtar, Molina Devi, Pahari Sanyal, Nawab, Trilok Kapoor, Rajkumari, and Kidar Sharma. The film showcased K. L. Saigal performing a farcical-comedy role which was a different format from his normal tragedy based stories. The story revolves around a cinema-crazy young man who wins a lottery, leading to a series of comedic situations when his friends join him.

== Plot ==
K. L. Saigal plays a cinema crazy young man obsessed with the allure of motion pictures. On winning the lottery he decides to enter the film world. The functioning of the film-world is shown with humorous elements in everyday situations. He is joined by his friends leading to funny incidents.

== Cast ==
- K. L. Saigal
- Sardar Akhtar
- Molina Devi
- Pahari Sanyal
- Nawab
- Jagdish Sethi
- Trilok Kapoor
- Rajkumari
- Kidar Sharma
- Amar Mullick
- Devbala
- Nemo
- Durgadas Bannerjee

== Soundtrack ==
#	Title	Singer
1	"O Dilruba Kahaan Tak Zulm-O-Sitam Sahenge"	K. L. Saigal, Pahari Sanyal
2	"Ghir Kar Aayi"	Rajkumari
3	"Dil-E-Nadan Tujhe Hua Kya Hai"	
4	"Ae Jalwaaye Janaana Jara Dekh Idhar Bhi"	
5	"Jagat Mein Prem Hi Prem Bhara Hai "	K. L. Saigal, Pahari Sanyal
6	"Jo Naukri Dila De B. A. Banaanewale Bigdi Hui Bana De"	K. L. Saigal, Pahari Sanyal
7	"Kabhi Ae Haqiqate Ras Bhari Nazar"	
8	"Machi Hai Dhoom Gulshan Mein Bahar Ayi"	
9	"Meri Ankhon Mein Aakar Samaya Hai Tu"	
10	"Saqiya Paimana Bhar Chhod Yeh Agar Magar"	
11	"Udo Karman Ki Gati Nyari Sundar Pankh Diye"	
12	"Kis Se Kahein Ki Kaun Hai Dil Mein Sama Raha"	
