= Maya (1961 film) =

- Poster
- Directed by: D.D. Kashyap
- Screenplay by: D.D. Kashyap
- Starring: Dev Anand; Mala Sinha; Lalita Pawar
- Edited by: Anant Apte
- Music by: Salil Chowdhary
- Production companies: Light of Asia Films; Rajkumari Kashyap
- Release date: 1961
- Running time: 157 minutes
- Country: India
- Language: Hindi

Maya (lit. 'The illusion') is a 1961 Bollywood film directed by D.D. Kashyap

== Synopsis ==
A wealthy young man, Manmohan strikes to his own to see how the rest of the world lives. He pretends to be poor, goes to live in a community of poor people, and falls in love with a poor girl, Shyama, who doesn't realise he's a wealthy man.

Maya gets off to a running start: we see a liveried servant Garibu hosting a dinner party for a bunch of other similarly clad servants. This is in the absence of all their masters. The 'host' of this party is servant to Seth, Ram Narain. Seth Ram Narain isn't in town right now, and his only son, Manmohan is out celebrating his birthday with a party with his friends.

Manmohan returns unexpectedly, depressed and in melancholy from that party. Now the movie shows a flashback of the party, where Manmohan—within the course of a few brief minutes—gets several bad jolts. First, he sees (standing outside the party hall) his old friend Deep, who's come to wish well to Manmohan for his birthday. Despite much cajoling on Manmohan's part, Deepak refuses to come inside—he insists that he, in his simple clothes, will be out of place amidst all those suits and glittery saris. Manmohan, who seems to genuinely like his friend, accepts that, and then apologises for not having kept in touch with Deepak. "I remember you'd told me that your wife was ill, and you needed money for her treatment", Manmohan tells Deepak. "But I went away to Kashmir with some friends, and forgot all about that. I hope bhabhi's better now." Then comes the first shock: Deepak's wife died as a result of that illness. Still shaken, Manmohan eventually goes back into the party hall, and here he receives two more shocks. First, he hears a 'friend' telling others that he's made friends with Manmohan in order to get a business deal through. Then Manmohan overhears his girlfriend Shiela telling another man that she only fawns on Manmohan because of his wealth; she doesn't really love him.

A disillusioned and depressed Manmohan comes home and goes to bed. He's tossing and turning when an unexpected visitor enters his room: a thief. Manmohan manages to overpower the man Sudesh pretty effortlessly: even though the thief has a dagger, he can't bring himself to use it. When Manmohan confronts him, he breaks down and confesses all. His name is Sudesh, and though he's a member of a gang of petty criminals, his heart's not in this work at all. He's ashamed of it, too, and begs Manmohan not to hand him over to the police. It'll break the heart of Sudesh's sister Shyama (Mala Sinha), who dotes on her brother. He tells Sudesh that he will keep mum and not hand Sudesh over to the cops—if Sudesh will help him in return. And how? By giving Manmohan a taste of poverty. Manmohan will accompany Sudesh to the chawl where Sudesh lives, and Manmohan will find a place to stay there too. He'll earn his daily bread, somehow make ends meet, do without, face hardship and live as a poor man. Sudesh agrees and after Manmohan has changed into more commonplace clothing, the two men go off to the chawl where Sudesh lives. Sudesh's Mausi is a kind and motherly lady from whom Manmohan—now calling himself Shyam—rents a room. This storyline moves forward with many other characters.

== Cast ==
- Dev Anand – Manmohan / Shyam
- Mala Sinha – Shyama
- Mubarak – Seth Shyam Narain
- Lalita Pawar – Mausi
- Sudesh Kumar – Sudesh
- Agha – Banke
- Sunder – Garibu
- Helen – Banke's darling
- Krishan Dhawan – Deepak
- Niranjan Sharma – Chawl Dweller, Tara's father
- Jayant – Ranvir
- Amjad Khan – a teenager, Ranvir's employee
- Bela Bose - Sheela
- Tabassum - chawl girl eating ice cream
- Nana Palshikar - Panditji
- Brahm Bhardwaj - dance announcer
- Rani Nrityashromani - dancer performing in chawl
- Tina Misquitta - dancer in Ranvir's den

== Soundtrack ==
Song	Singer(s)	Picturised on	Music director	Lyricist	Raga
"Tasveer Teri Dil Me, Jis Din Se Utari Hai"	Mohammed Rafi, Lata Mangeshkar	Dev Anand & Mala Sinha	Salil Chowdhury	Majrooh Sultanpuri	
"Jaa Re, Jaa Re Ud Jaa Re Panchhi, Bahaaron Ke Des Jaa Re"	Lata Mangeshkar	Mala Sinha	Salil Chowdhury	Majrooh Sultanpuri	Bhairavi
"Koi Sone Ke Dilwala, Koi Chandi Ke Dilwala"	Mohammed Rafi	Dev Anand	Salil Chowdhury	Majrooh Sultanpuri	
"Zindagi Hai Kya Sun Meri Jaan"	Mohammed Rafi	Dev Anand	Salil Chowdhury	Majrooh Sultanpuri	
"Ae Dil Kahan Teri Manzil, Na Koi Deepak Hai Na Koi Tara Hai"	Dwijen Mukherjee	Dev Anand	Salil Chowdhury	Majrooh Sultanpuri	
"Phir Ek Baar Kaho, Usi Ada Se Kaho"	Lata Mangeshkar, Dwijen Mukherjee	Dev Anand & Mala Sinha	Salil Chowdhury	Majrooh Sultanpuri	
"Ae Dil Kahan Teri Manzil, Na Koi Deepak Hai Na Koi Tara Hai"	Lata Mangeshkar	Mala Sinha	Salil Chowdhury	Majrooh Sultanpuri	
"Jadu Dale Hai Machal Machal Kiski Nazar"	Asha Bhosle	Dev Anand	Salil Chowdhury	Majrooh Sultanpuri	
"Sanam Tu Chal Diya Rasta Mere Bina"	Mohammed Rafi	Helen & Agha	Salil Chowdhury	Majrooh Sultanpuri	
