= Clare Mendonça =

Indian journalist

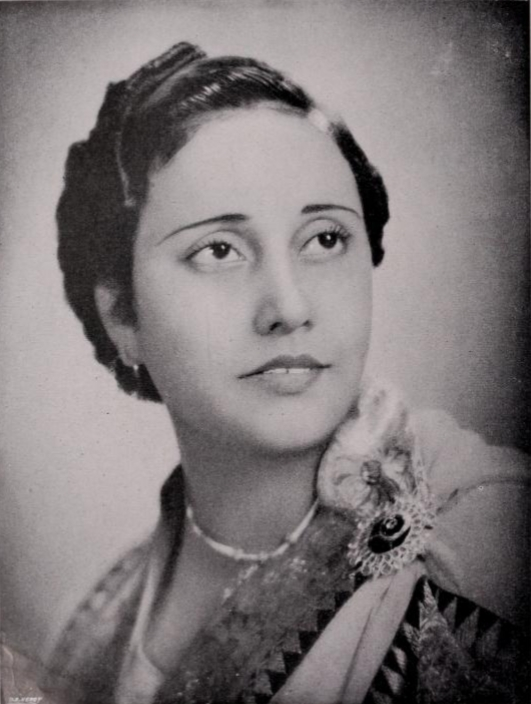
- Mendonça in 1939
- Born: 1910
- Died: 1953 (aged 43)
- Education: St. Xavier's College, Bombay
- Occupation: Journalist
- Years active: 1931–1953
- Employer: Times of India
- Known for: One of the first female journalists of India
- Notable credit: Filmfare Awards were earlier called Clare Awards in her honour

Clare Mendonça (1910–1953) was a prominent film journalist in India, whose film reviews had a large readership. After her early death, she was honoured when the Clare Award, now the Filmfare Award, was instituted in 1954.

== Career ==
Mendonça was a film critic with the Evening News of India newspaper, the evening partner of the Times of India Group around 1931, and later with The Times of India from 1933 to 1953.

== Family ==
Her family members included siblings Msgr Filipe Neri de Mendonça, Padre Guilherme de Mendonça and Frederico Mendonça. Fr. Felipe Neri Mendonça was an outstanding educationist and a strict disciplinarian, principal from 1931 at the prominent English-medium St. Joseph's High School, Arpora, credited with constructing a new school building inaugurated in 1937, on the golden jubilee celebrations of the school.

== Education, posts ==
Mendonça graduated from St. Xavier's College in Bombay. She was elected as a co-vice president of the Film Journalists Association in 1939 when founded in Bombay, a post she shared with Khwaja Ahmad Abbas, under the presidency of Baburao Patel.

Mendonça also wrote popular weekend film reviews in The Times of India Sunday supplement.

== Award named ==
According to The Times of India, the Filmfare Awards were "earlier supposed to be called, The Clare Awards after the newspaper's film critic, Clare Mendonça". She has been called "one of the earliest film journalists in India".
