= Sati Mahananda =

- Directed by: Baburao Patel
- Produced by: Gandharva Cinetone
- Starring: Padma Devi; Mubarak Merchant; Shirin Banu
- Music by: Govindrao Tembe
- Release date: 1933
- Country: India
- Language: Hindi

Sati Mahananda, also known as Song of Celestial, is a 1933 Indian Hindi-language film directed by Baburao Patel and produced under the banner of Gandharva Cinetone. It was one of the early-career films of Patel, before he established himself as a film critic through the periodical Filmindia. The cast of Sati Mahananda includes Padma Devi, Mubarak Merchant, Madhukar Gupte, Shirin Banu, Shantaram, Raja Pandit, and Kamlavati. Its music was composed by Govindrao Tembe. According to Limca Book of Records, it was the first film to be shot inside the Ellora Caves.
