= Hira Aur Patthar =

- Directed by: Vijay Bhatt
- Written by: Satyadev Dubey (dialogues); Moosa Kaleem
- Screenplay by: Ram Kelkar
- Story by: Arun Bhatt
- Produced by: Arun Bhatt; Kishore Vyas
- Starring: Shashi Kapoor; Shabana Azmi
- Cinematography: Pravin Bhatt
- Edited by: B. Prasad
- Music by: Kalyanji Anandji
- Distributed by: Vijay Films International
- Release date: 1977
- Country: India
- Language: Hindi

Hira Aur Patthar is a 1977 Hindi-language film directed by Vijay Bhatt and starring Shashi Kapoor and Shabana Azmi. Last Film of Vijay Bhatt

== Cast ==
- Shashi Kapoor...Shankar
- Shabana Azmi...Gauri
- Asit Sen...Chanda's Father
- Ashok Kumar...Dr. Anand
- Bindu...Roopa Bai
- G. Asrani...Tota
- Bharat Bhushan ...Tulsiram
- Ramesh Deo ... Gangaram

== Soundtrack ==
#	Title	Singer(s)
1	"Tak Tak Tunak Tin"	Kishore Kumar
2	"Naam Tera Bhale"	Lata Mangeshkar
3	"Pyaar Kaagaj Pe Likhi Kahaani Nahi" (Male)	Kishore Kumar
4	"Hum Tum Pehali Baar Mile Hai"	Lata Mangeshkar
5	Pyaar Kaagaj Pe Likhi Kahaani Nahi" (Female)	Lata Mangeshkar
6	"Na Jaao Saiyaan Riske"	Asha Bhosle
