= Bala Joban =

- Directed by: Baburao Patel
- Produced by: Gandharva Cinetone
- Starring: Padma Devi; Gulab; Mubarak; Shirin Banu; Raja Pandit
- Music by: Badri Prasad Manick
- Release date: 1934
- Country: India
- Language: Hindi

Bala Joban is a 1934 Indian Hindi-language film directed by Baburao Patel and produced under the banner of Gandharva Cinetone. Its music was composed by Badri Prasad Manick, and the cast included Padma Devi, Gulab, Mubarak, Shirin Banu, Raja Pandit, M. Gupte, Maruti Pahelwan, Nandu Khote and Badri Prasad.

In 1935, Bala Joban became the first Hindi feature film to be exhibited in Trinidad. It had an extensive run at the Globe cinema in Port of Spain and the Gaiety cinema in San Fernando. In The Sunday Guardian in December 1935, the film was described as an "Indian Talking Film Success".
