= Aurat (1940 film) =

1940 film by Mehboob Khan

Aurat Woman
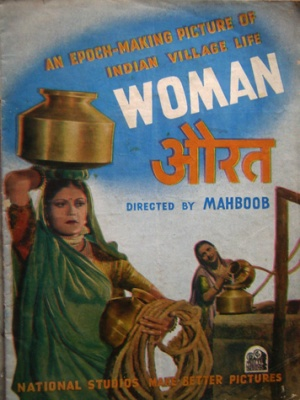
- Film poster
- Directed by: Mehboob Khan
- Written by: Babubhai Mehta; Wajahat Mirza
- Starring: Sardar Akhtar
- Cinematography: Faredoon Irani
- Edited by: Shamsudin Kadri
- Music by: Anil Biswas
- Distributed by: National Pictures
- Release date: 1940
- Running time: 154 minutes
- Country: India
- Language: Hindustani

Aurat

Aurat, also known by its English title Woman, is a 1940 Indian film directed by Mehboob Khan and starring Sardar Akhtar, Surendra, Yakub, Kanhaiyalal and Arun Kumar Ahuja. The film's music is by Anil Biswas and dialogue is by Wajahat Mirza. Mehboob Khan later remade this film as Mother India (1957), which is considered one of the biggest hits of all time in Indian Cinema (and again repeated Wajahat Mirza for dialogues, Kanhiyalal as Sukhi Lala and Faredoon Irani for cinematography).

== Plot ==
Radha (Sardar Akhtar) is an indomitable woman, toiling away to feed her three sons and to pay off Sukhilala (Kanhaiyalal), the village's rapacious moneylender. When she learns that she is pregnant again, her husband, Shamu (Arun Kumar Ahuja), runs away, leaving her to fend for herself against poverty and the lecherous advances of Sukhilala. Later, the two eldest children die, leaving her with only two sons: the strait-laced Ramu (Surendra) and the wild Birju (Yakub). The latter of the two becomes a bandit, who kills Sukhilala and kidnaps his childhood sweetheart. As a result, Radha and Ramu are cast out of the village. Eventually, Radha kills Birju for dishonoring her.

== Cast ==
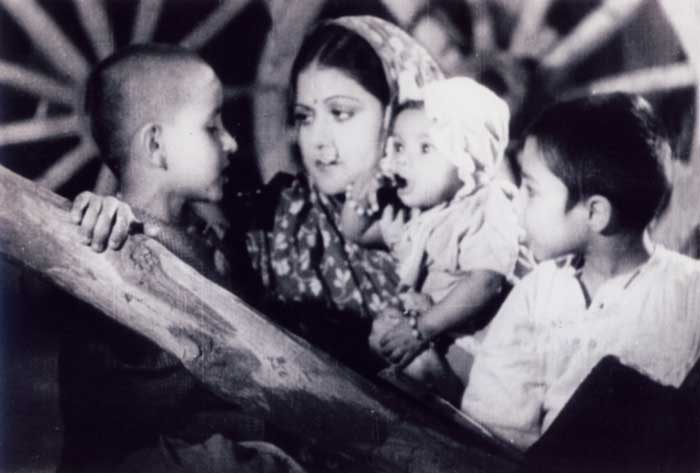
A scene from the film

- Surendra as Ramu
- Sardar Akhtar as Radha
- Yakub as Birju
- Aroon as Shamu
- Harish as Bansi
- Jyoti as Jamna
- Kanhaiyalal as Sukhi
- Vatsala Kumtekar as Kamla
- Sunalini as Sunder Chachi
- Brijrani as Tulsi
- Akbar Gulam Ali as Laloo
- Kanu Pande as Chandoo
- Wasker as Fulchand
- Amirbanu as Kashibai
