= D. V. Paluskar =

Indian vocalist (1921–1955)

- D. V. Paluskar

Background information
- Born: Dattatreya Vishnu Paluskar; 28 May 1921
- Origin: kurundwad, Maharashtra, India
- Died: 26 October 1955 (aged 34) Mumbai, Maharashtra, India
- Genres: Hindustani Classical Music
- Occupation: Hindustani Classical Vocalist recognised musician saved hindustani classical's name..
- Years active: 1935–1955
- Label: His Master's Voice

Pandit Dattatreya Vishnu Paluskar (28 May 1921 – 26 October 1955), was a Hindustani classical vocalist. He was considered a child prodigy.

== Early life and background ==
D.V. Paluskar was born in Nasik, Bombay Presidency to well-known Hindustani musician Vishnu Digambar Paluskar. His original surname was Gadgil, but as they hailed from the village Palus (near Sangli), they came to be known as the "Paluskar" family.

He was only ten years old when his father died, and was subsequently trained by Pandit Vinayakrao Patwardhan and Pandit Narayanrao Vyas. He was also trained by Pandit Chintamanrao Paluskar and Pandit Mirashi Buwa.

== Career and life ==
D.V. Paluskar gave his debut performance at the Harvallabh Sangeet Sammelan in Punjab at the age of fourteen. He inherited the Gwalior gharana and the Gandharva Mahavidyalaya, but he was always open to adopting aesthetic features of other gharanas and styles.

He sung a duet with Ustad Amir Khan in the film Baiju Bawra. The only other film he sang for was a Bengali film called Shaap Mochan.

== Death ==
He died from encephalitis on 26 October 1955. Mumbai, India

== Discography ==
Because of Paluskar's sudden death at the age of 34, his recorded legacy consists primarily of 78 rpm shellac singles cut for Columbia Records and His Master's Voice (HMV), alongside later long-playing (LP) archival compilations and All India Radio (AIR) broadcast recordings.

=== 78 RPM Shellac Recordings ===
Many of Paluskar's most celebrated classical bandishes and devotional pieces were originally issued as 78 rpm shellac discs in the 1940s and 1950s.

| Year | Label & Cat. No. | Song Title | Raga / Style |
|---|---|---|---|
| 1941 | Columbia GE 3507 | "Jab Janaki Natha" / "Raghupati Raghav" | Bhajan |
| 1944 | Columbia GE 30291 | "Kaliyan Sang Karat Rang Raliyaan" | Raga Bahar |
| 1944 | HMV | "Are Man Ram Nam" (Vilambit) | Raga Lalat |
| 1945 | Columbia GE 3458 | "Jare Kanha Re" (alternatively "Jare Kanre") | Raga Kedar |
| 1947 | Columbia GE 3813 | "Bunara Byahan Ayere" | Raga Gaud Malhar |
| 1947 | Columbia GE 3868 | "Marun Kavana Kaja" | Raga Marwa |
| 1947 | HMV | "Kaisku Marua" | Raga Bibhas |
| 1947 | HMV | "Nike Ghunghariya" | Raga Bilaskhani Todi |
| 1948 | Columbia GE 3943 | "Piya Nahin Aye" | Raga Hansakinkini |
| 1950 | HMV | "Barhaiya Lao Lao Re" | Raga Asawari |
| 1950 | HMV | "Piyu Palan Lagi Mori Ankhiyan" | Raga Gaud Sarang |
| 1950 | HMV | "Surja Rahi Ho" | Raga Hameer |
| 1950 | HMV | "Koelia Bole" | Raga Tilak Kamod |
| 1954 | HMV | "Aai Samdhin" | Raga Miyan Ka Malhar |
| 1955 | HMV | "Nand Ke Chhaila Dhit" | Raga Malkauns |

=== Playback Singing (Filmography) ===
Paluskar made a rare exception to perform classical playback singing for two feature films.

| Year | Film | Language | Song Title | Co-singers / Notes |
|---|---|---|---|---|
| 1952 | Baiju Bawra | Hindi | "Aaj Gaawat Man Mero Jhoomke" | Duet with Ustad Amir Khan (Raga Deshi) |
| 1952 | Baiju Bawra | Hindi | "Langar Kankariya Ji Na Maro" | Duet with Ustad Amir Khan (Raga Todi) |
| 1955 | Shaap Mochan | Bengali | "Shono Shono He Shudhi Jan" | Rabindra Sangeet/Classical structure |

=== Posthumous Compilations and Archival Albums ===
Following his passing, major record companies like Saregama (formerly HMV/The Gramophone Company of India) and CBS reissued his recordings onto LPs, cassettes, and compact discs.

- The Great Heritage: Pandit D. V. Paluskar (Vols. 1–3) (1959/1991, HMV / Saregama) – Features prominent Gwalior gharana ragas like Gaud Sarang, Tilak Kamod, Kedar, and Hameer.
- Classical Vocal (EMI) (1983) – Reissue of mid-century khyal recordings.
- Bhajans (CBS) (1988) – Dedicated compilation of his highly popular devotional songs including "Payoji Maine Ram Ratan Dhan" and "Thumak Chalat Ramchandra".
- Classical Vocal: Morning Melodies (1988, All India Radio / His Master's Voice) – Features archival live broadcasts of Raga Ramkali, Raga Desi, and Raga Todi.
- Great Heritage Exclusive Archival Collection (3-CD Set, 2010, Saregama) – Includes remastered tracks from 78 rpm plates and AIR recordings spanning night and twilight melodies like Raga Shree, Raga Kedar, and Raga Khambavati.
