= Baiju Bawra =

Indian musician and composer (1480–1541)

- Born: Baij Nath; 1480; Champaner, Gujarat
- Died: 1541 (aged 60–61) Chanderi, Madhya Pradesh
- Genre: Hindustani classical music
- Occupations: Court Musician, Composer and Singer under Raja Man Singh Tomar of Gwalior Kingdom
- Works: Dhrupad Style of Singing
- Years active: 1496 - 1541

Baiju Bawra (Lit. "Baiju the Insane", born as Baij Nath) was a dhrupad musician and composer from medieval India. Nearly all the information on Baiju Bawra comes from legends, and lacks historical authenticity. According to the most popular legends, he lived in the Mughal period during the 15th and 16th centuries. He was one of the court musicians of Raja Man Singh Tomar of Gwalior. He was the counterpart of Tansen in Gwalior Kingdom and considered his bête noire.

== Gwalior-Chanderi legend ==
According to legend, mentioned by Susheela Misra in Some immortals of Hindustani music, Baiju Bawra was born as Baij nath in a poor Sanadya Brahmin family in Champaner, Gujarat Sultanate. After his father's death, his mother, a devotee of Krishna, went to Vrindavan. There Baiju met his teacher Swami Haridas, a court musician of Gwalior Kingdom, Swami Haridas took him to Gwalior and trained him in a Sangeet Vidyalaya in Gwalior.

Gradually, Baiju become famous in Gwalior and invited by the Raja of Gwalior to join his court as musician. He became famous musician in Gwalior. Baiju married to one of his disciple Prabha and both had a daughter.

Later, in early 1500 Baiju inducted as a music composer and researcher for compilation of dhrupad under the patronage of Raja Man Singh Tomar, of Gwalior Kingdom. During this period Baiju musical career reached its zenith. He also met a girl named Kalavati and fell in love with her. The queen of Gwalior Rani Mrignayani also became his disciple. When Baiju was in Gwalior he got an offer from Raja of Chandri to serve him as his court musician, subsequently, he left for Chanderi leaving Kalavati and his wife Prabha in Gwalior. When Baiju returned to Gwalior, he was shocked to find his entire family gone. After knowing all this and searching for his family for months he went back to meet Kalavati just to know that she got married and has already left the city. He became a mendicant, and wandered from place to place, looking for Kalavati. People thought of him as an insane person, and thus, he came to be known as "bawra". (Alternative legends say that he came to be known as "Bawra", because he was obsessed with classical music.)

Tansen, another famous court musician of Gwalior Kingdom and was Baiju's counterpart there, who later joined Rewa Kingdom, had heard Baiju's praise from his Sufi master Muhammad Ghaus. He asked his own patron Raja Ramachandra Singh of Rewa to organize a musical contest, in hope that Baiju would come to this contest to salvage his reputation. Baiju came to the contest, and performed extraordinary feats such as hypnotizing deer through his rendering of Raag Mrigranjini and melting a stone slab through Raag Malkauns. Tansen recognized him and embraced him.

The legends in the books preserved in Jai Vilas Palace in Gwalior state that Baiju Bawra could light oil lamps by singing Raag Deepak; make it rain by singing the raag Megh Malhar, or Gaud Malhar; and bloom flowers by singing raga Bahar.

Baiju Bawra has written two books namely ekadasha and ramsagar.

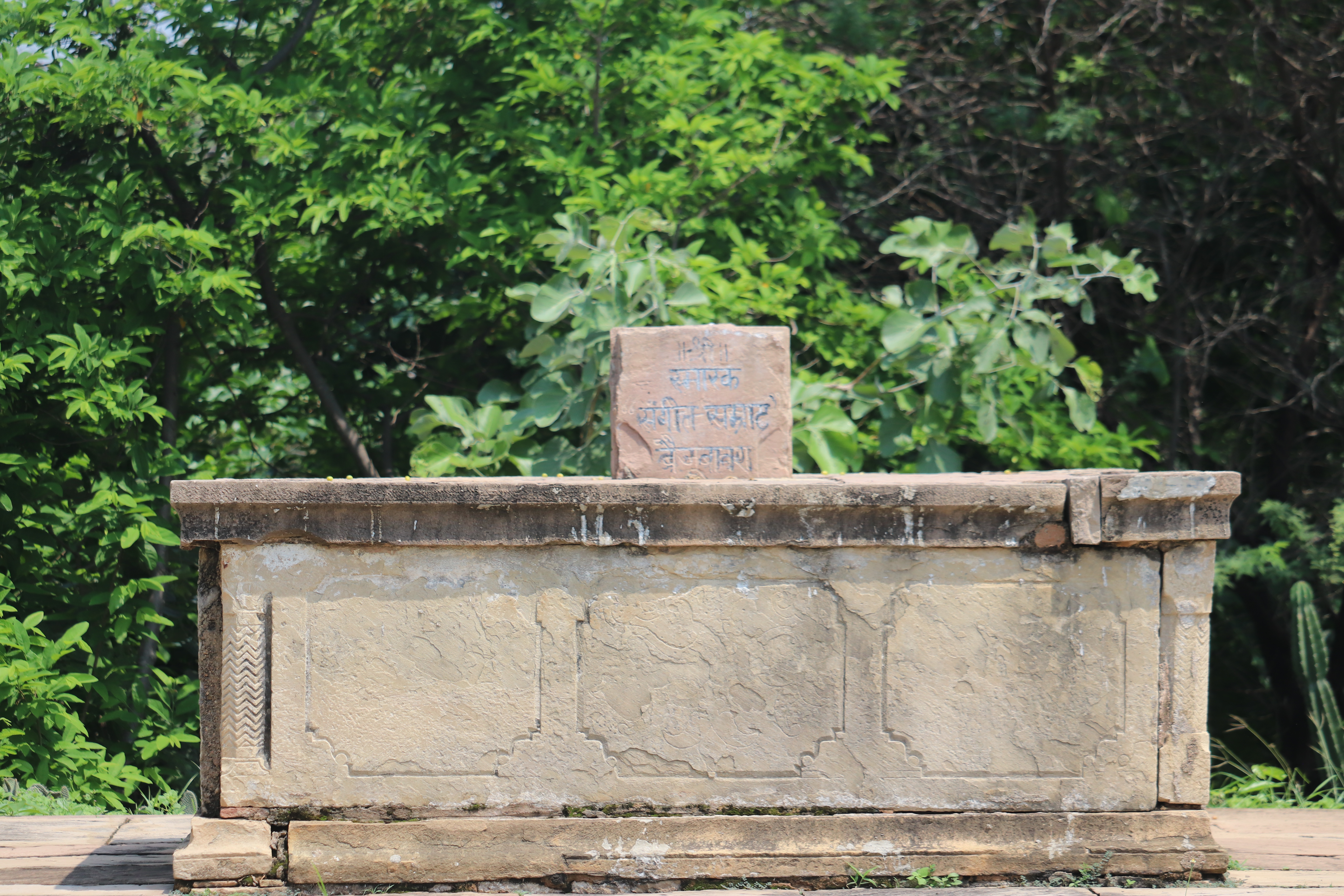
Samadhi of Baiju Bawra in Chanderi

Baiju Bawra died in Chanderi after suffering from typhoid on Vasant Panchami day in the year 1541. A purported samadhi of Baiju Bawra is located in Chanderi.

There are also some claims that Baiju Bawra died when he sang the raag Deepak in a competition with Tansen, and the rage of the raag burnt him into ashes.

== Legend of Bacchu ==
Some medieval narratives, mentioned in works such as Mirat-i-Sikandari (17th century), describe an incident about a Gujarati singer called Bacchu (also known as Bakshu or Manjhu). According to the narrative, Bacchu was a musician in the court of Sultan Bahadur Shah of Gujarat. When the Mughal emperor Humayun attacked Bahadur Shah's contingent in Mandu, Bacchu fell in the hands of a Mughal soldier. He was about to be killed, when he was recognized by a Raja allied with the Mughals. The Raja introduced him to emperor Humayun, who was pleased with his singing and granted his wish to release the Gujarati prisoners. Bacchu remained in service of the emperor for some days, but then ran away to Sultan Bahadur Shah, who had escaped from Mandu to Champaner.

Bacchu is identified with Baiju by a section of scholars. However, others believe that Bacchu and Baiju were two distinct persons.

== In popular culture ==
Baiju Bawra, a 1952 Hindi-language movie, depicts a completely fictionalized version of Baiju's life. The film was a big commercial success. In the movie, Tansen is known to be the greatest musician alive. Nobody is allowed to sing in the city unless he or she can sing better than Tansen. Anyone who attempts to sing, without doing it better than Tansen, is executed. Baiju's father dies when Tansen's sentry tries to stop him from singing. Years later, Baiju avenges his father's death by defeating Tansen in a musical duel. At the end of the movie, Baiju dies with Gauri by drowning in the lake.
