= Ek Hi Bhool (1940 film) =

- Directed by: Vijay Bhatt
- Produced by: "Vijay-Shankar" Bhatt
- Starring: P. Jairaj; Mehtab; Umakant; Baby Meena
- Music by: Shankar Rao Vyas; Pandit Anuj (lyrics)
- Production company: Prakash Pictures
- Release date: 1940
- Running time: 155 minutes
- Country: India
- Language: Hindi

Ek Hi Bhool (The Only Mistake) is a 1940 Hindi social drama directed by Vijay Bhatt. The film was produced by Vijay and his brother Shankar Bhatt for Bhatt's production banner Prakash Pictures. The Music direction was by Shankar Rao Vyas with lyrics by Pandit Anuj. The film starred P. Jairaj, Mehtab, Umakant, Baby Meena, Prahlad Dutt, Rekha and Baby Meena (Meena Kumari).

== Cast ==
- P. Jairaj
- Mehtab

Priyanka puthran as baby Raju

- Umakant
- Amirbai Karnataki
- Takle
- Prahlad Dutt
- Meena Kumari (then Baby Meena)
- Munshi Khanjar
- Rekha

== Soundtrack ==
Music was composed by Shankar Rao Vyas and the lyricist was Pandit Anuj.

=== Songlist ===
#	Title
1	"Ek Roz Mein Dilli Jaakar Kaali Billi Laayi"
2	"Jaoongi Main Jaoongi Sajan Ke Paas Jaaongi"
3	"Mat Kar Tu Abhiman Manwa"
4	"Main Phoolon Ki Sugandh Bankar Upvan Sara Mahkaun"
5	"Paagal Kehte Hain"
6	"Piya Milan Ko Jaana, Rang Mahal Ko Chhod Suhagin"
