= Jayant (actor) =

Indian film actor of 1930s to 60s (1915–1975)

- Born: Zakaria Khan; 15 October 1915; Peshawar, North-West Frontier Province, British India (present-day Khyber Pakhtunkhwa, Pakistan)
- Died: 2 June 1975 (aged 59); Bombay, Maharashtra, India (present-day Mumbai)
- Occupation: Actor
- Years active: 1935 – 1975
- Children: 3 including: Amjad Khan; Imtiaz Khan
- Parent: Sayeed Ahmed Khan (father)

Zakaria Khan (15 October 1915 – 2 June 1975), better known by his stage name Jayant, was an Indian actor. He was the father of actors Amjad Khan and Imtiaz Khan. His notable works are in films like Amar, Memdidi and Nazneen. He worked in many movies with Dilip Kumar, Madhubala and Kishore Kumar.

== Early life ==
Jayant was born in Nodeh Payan (Nawan Kalli), Peshawar, North-West Frontier Province, British India on 15 October 1915 and was named Zakaria Khan. He was a Pashtun. He was only able to finish his elementary education. Jayant was a police officer in Alwar, Rajasthan before starting the film career.

== Career ==
Jayant was tall and had a deep voice. He worked in Vijay Bhatt's first Gujarati movie Sansaar Leela (1933). The name Jayant was also given to him by director and producer Vijay Bhatt. He played lead role in many movies like Bombay Mail (1935), Challenge (1936), His Highness (1937) and State Express (1938).

== Personal life ==
Jayant was married and his children were film actors Amjad Khan (of Gabbar Singh fame) and Imtiaz Khan. He was the grandfather of Shadaab Khan, Ahlam Khan, Seemaab Khan and Ayesha Khan and father-in-law of Shaila Khan and Krutika Desai Khan (wife of Imtiaz).

== Death ==
Jayant died on 2 June 1975 at age 60 in Bombay two months prior to the release of his son Amjad Khan's most successful movie Sholay. He died due to throat cancer. He was buried at Naupada Qabarstan of Bandra West in Mumbai.

== Filmography ==
- Love and God (1986) as Emir-e-Basra
- Simon (1980) as Barundi
- Insaaniyat (1974) as Raghuveer / Diwan
- Mera Gaon Mera Desh (1971) as Hawaldar Major Jaswant Singh
- Jane Anjane (1971) as Shankar
- Reshma Aur Shera (1971) as Sagat Singh
- Heer Raanjha (1970) as Chaudhary
- Maa Aur Mamta (1970) as Qasim
- Aag Aur Daag (1970) as Shyam
- Ek Nanhi Munni Ladki Thi (1970)
- Inspector (1970) as Marshal
- My Love (1970)
- Anmol Moti (1969)
- Do Raaste (1969) as Khan
- Sapnon Ka Saudagar (1968) as Thakur Rai Bahadur Harnam Singh
- Sunghursh (1968) as Bhavani Prasad
- Sagaai (1966) as Dwarkanath
- Thakur Jarnail Singh (1966)
- Himalay Ki God Mein (1965) as Lakhan Singh
- Sher Dil (1965)
- Beti Bete (1964) as Raghu
- April Fool (1964) as Lal
- Haqeeqat (1964) as Brigadier Singh
- Leader (1964) as Diwan Mahendranath
- Zindagi (1964) as Sher Khan
- Son of India (1962) as Jung Bahadur "J.B."
- Bada Aadmi (1961)
- Jhumroo (1961) as Dwarkanath
- Maya (1961) as Ranveer Dada
- Memdidi (1961) as Sher Mohammed Khan "Shera"
- Parakh (1960) as Rai Bahadur Tandav Tarafdar
- Kal Hamara Hai (1959) as Seth Heeralal
- Madhumati (1958) as Pawan Raja
- Naya Andaz (1956)
- Baap Re Baap (1955) as Raja Bahadur Moti Sagar
- Insaniyat (1955) as Zangoora
- Musafir Khana (1955)
- Tangewali (1955)
- Yasmin (1955)
- Amar (1954) as Sankat Chhalia
- Watan (1954)
- Amar Kirtan (1954)
- Rail Ka Dibba (1953)
- Nazneen (1951)
- Saiyan (1951)
- Pardes (1950) as Rana Sahib
- Chaar Din (1949)
- Dulari (1949) as Girija Shankar
- Zevaraat (1949)
- Roop Nagar (1947)
- Maa Baap Ki Laaj (1946)
- Shirin Farhad (1945)
- Poonji (1943)
- Apni Nagariya (1940)
- Sardar (1940)
- Sardar-e-Awwal (1939)
- State Express (1938) as Prince
- Azad Veer (1936)
- Snehlata (1936)
- Bombay Mail (1935)
- Lal Chitta (1935)
- Bambai Ki Sethani (1935)
- Sansar Leela (1933)
