= Vijay Bhatt =

Indian film director (1907–1993)

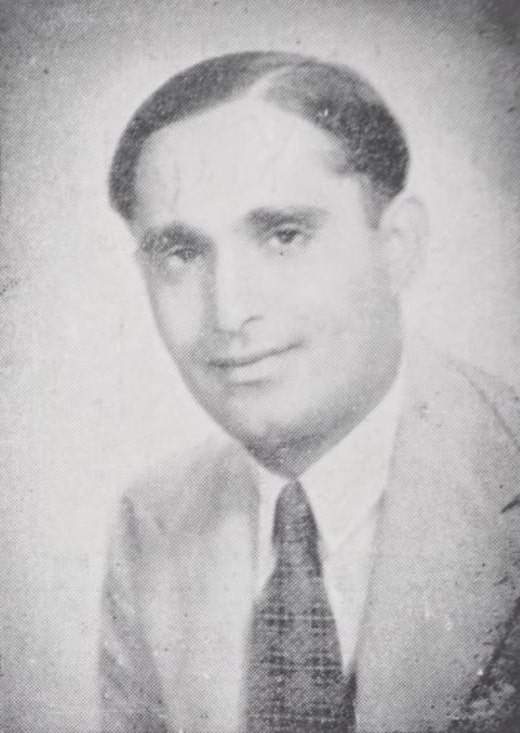
- Bhatt in 1942
- Born: Vrajlal Jagneshwar Bhatt; 12 May 1907; Palitana, Palitana State, Kathiawar Agency, British India (now Gujarat, India)
- Died: 17 October 1993 (aged 86); Mumbai, Maharashtra, India
- Occupations: Film producer, film director, screenwriter
- Years active: 1929– 1977
- Spouse: Rama Bhatt
- Children: Pravin Bhatt; Arun Bhatt
- Relatives: Vikram Bhatt (grandson); Chirantan Bhatt (grandson)
- Awards: 1966: Filmfare Best Movie Award: Himalaya Ki God Mein (1965)
- Website: vijaybhatt.net

Vijay Bhatt (born Vrajlal Jagneshwar Bhatt; 12 May 1907 – 17 October 1993) was a producer-director-screenwriter of Hindi cinema, who made such films as Ram Rajya (1943), Baiju Bawra (1952), Goonj Uthi Shehnai (1959) and Himalaya Ki God Mein (1965).

He founded Prakash Pictures, a film production company and Prakash Studios in Andheri East, Mumbai, which produced 64 feature films. Bhatt was a founding member of the Film and Television Producers Guild of India.

== Biography ==
=== Early life and education ===
Vijay Jagneshwar Bhatt was born on 12 May 1907, into the household of Benkunwar Bhatt and Jagneshwar Bhatt, who was a railway guard at Palitana, Bhavnagar district, Gujarat.

He moved to Bombay in his twenties, along with his elder brother, Shankarbhai Bhatt, who took up a job, and went on to become a producer; Vijay enrolled in St. Xavier's College, and completed Intermediate from the Science stream, and later received a diploma in 'Electrical Lighting and Traction' through a correspondence course from London.

=== Career ===
After completing his education with an electrician's diploma, Bhatt started his career at Bombay Electric Supply & Tramways Company Limited (BEST), where he worked till he became the Drawing Office Superintendent. Although he had already written a few scripts for Gujarati theatre, a meeting with Ardeshir Irani was the turning point in his career. Irani, who later produced Alam Ara India's first talkie, and also managed the Royal Film Company studio, introduced Bhatt to its owner Abu Husain.

When Husain liked one of his scripts, it allowed for his debut in Indian film industry as a screenwriter, for director K P Bhave's silent film, Vidhi Ka Vidhan. Irani produced two more of his scripts, Pani Mein Aag and Ghulam (1929) He eventually produced his first silent film, Delhi Ka Chhela in 1929, and went on to direct many notable films, in Hindi, Gujarati and Marathi cinema.

His early film Ram Rajya (1942) was a big hit, and also made news, when it was shown to Mahatma Gandhi in 1942. In 1947, he took the film to the US, where it was first shown at Museum of Modern Art, New York on 5 May 1947, later he also met noted Hollywood director, Cecil B. DeMille.

His film Baiju Bawra (1952), which was based on the historical tiff between Emperor Akbar's court musician Tansen and the talented singer, Baiju Bawra, ran for a hundred weeks in Bombay, becoming a diamond jubilee hit, and also established its lead cast, Meena Kumari and Bharat Bhushan.

Meena Kumari, who won her first Filmfare Best Actress Award for the film, was launched by Vijay Bhatt in his film Leatherface (1939), as a child artist, "Baby Meena" (born Mahjabeen Bano), a name that stayed with her for the rest of her career.

== Personal life ==
Vijay Bhatt was married to Rama Bhatt, with whom he had two sons, Arun Bhatt and Pravin Bhatt, and two daughters, and later six granddaughters and four grandsons. Arun Bhatt, his older son, was a film director in Gujarati and Hindi cinema. He was a producer/director of Gujarati films such as Mota Gharni Vahu, Paarki Thaapan and Lohi Ni Sagaai and a record of 9 films being jubilees out of the 14 he had produced. His younger son, Pravin Bhatt, is a cinematographer in Hindi cinema (Masoom, Umrao Jaan), and his son, Vikram Bhatt, is a noted film director (Ghulam, Raaz). Arun Bhatt's son Chirantan Bhatt is a music director in Bollywood and Tollywood and has produced tracks such as BOSS, Gabbar Is Back, Haunted 3D and 1920 Evil Returns, EMI and Mission Istanbul.

== Filmography ==
As Director

- Khwab Ki Duniya aka Dreamland (1937)
- State Express (1938)
- Leatherface aka Farzande Watan (1939)
- Narsi Bhagat (1940)
- Ek Hi Bhool (1940)
- Bharat Milap (1942)
- Ram Rajya (1943)
- Vikramaditya (1945)
- Samaj Ko Badal Dalo (1947)
- Rambaan (1948)
- Baiju Bawra (1952)
- Shri Chaitanya Mahaprabhu (1953)
- Ramayan (1954)
- Patrani (1956)
- Goonj Uthi Shehnai (1959)
- Angulimaal (1960)
- Hariyali Aur Raasta (1962)
- Himalaya Ki God Mein (1965)
- Ram Rajya (1967)
- Banphool (1971)
- Hira Aur Patthar (1977)

== Awards ==
- 1966: Filmfare Best Movie Award: Himalaya Ki God Mein (1965)

== See also ==
- Nanabhai Bhatt
- Chirantan Bhatt
