= State Express =

- Poster
- Directed by: Vijay Bhatt
- Written by: Sampatlal Srivastava (dialogue)
- Produced by: Vijay Bhatt
- Starring: Jayant; Sardar Akhtar; Umakant; Shirin
- Music by: Lallubhai Nayak; Pandit Anuj (lyrics)
- Production company: Prakash Pictures
- Release date: 1938
- Running time: 171 minutes
- Country: India
- Language: Hindi

State Express is a 1938 Indian Hindi-language action film directed by Vijay Bhatt for his production company Prakash Pictures. The film's music was composed by Lallubhai Nayak and the dialogues were written by Sampatlal Srivastava. Zakaria Khan, named Jayant by Vijay Bhatt, and who was to become a famous character artist, started his career as a leading man in several of Bhatt's earlier films from Bombay Mail (1935) to Bijli (1939), including State Express The film starred Jayant, Sardar Akhtar, Umakant, Lallubhai Nayak, Shirin and Ismail.

State Express involved a masked heroine (Sardar Akhtar) who performed several stunts, a young prince (Jayant), and his scheming uncle. The film had the basic 'stunt' film features, masked characters, a gorilla, two dogs Tommy and Tiger (given poster credit) and crashing trains.

== Cast ==
- Jayant
- Sardar Akhtar
- Umakant
- Shirin
- Zaverbhai
- M. Zahur
- Lallubhai Nayak
- Ismail
- Jehangir
- Chhotejaan
- Vithaldass
- Athavale

== Review And Box office ==
State Express is cited by Rajadhyaksha and Willemen as a "successful film" doing well at the box-office. The main draw of the film was a "performing gorilla" and Sardar Akhtar's songs and performance. The film was one of the "best stunt films" from Bhatt, who normally made mythologicals.

== Soundtrack ==
The music was composed by Lallubhai Nayak, with the lyricist being Pandit Anuj. The singers were Sardar Akhtar, Jayant, Lallubhai Nayak and Rajkumari.

=== Song list ===
#	Title	Singer
1	"Aao Aao Aao Hey Prem Pujari Aao"	Sardar Akhtar
2	"Bane Na Prem Ka Deewana"	Sardar Akhtar
3	"Bana LeApni Bigadi Baat"	Rajkumari
4	"Baar Baar Man Ko Samjhaun"	Sardar Akhtar
5	"Sabse Shreshth Naari Sansar Hai Pujari"	Jayant, Lallubhai Nayak, Sardar Akhtar
6	"Panchhi Ban Ke Ud Jaaun"	Sardar Akhtar
7	"Us But Ki Talaash Mein Main Jaun Kahan Kahan"	Sardar Akhtar
