= Baburao Patel =

Indian film director

Baburao Patel, Originally - Baburao Patil
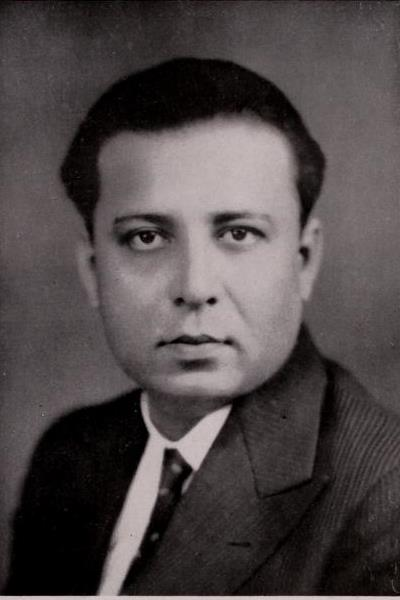
- Born: 4 March 1904; Maswan, Palghar
- Died: 1982 (aged 77–78)
- Title: Member of Parliament for Shajapur
- Term: 1967-1971
- Successor: Jagannathrao Joshi
- Political party: Bharatiya Jana Sangh (now BJP)
- Spouse(s): Yesubai Patil (First), Shirin (second), Sushila Rani Patel (third)
- Parents: Pandurang Vitthal Patil; Jamuna Devi Patil
- Relatives: Geeta Patel-D'Souza (Grandchild from Second Wife)

Baburao Patel (1904–1982) was an Indian publisher and writer, associated with films and politics.

== Career ==
Baburao: A Pioneer of Indian Cinema. Baburao was a key figure in the early days of Indian cinema. He started his career as a journalist, working for the pioneering film magazine Cinema Samachar. This early exposure to the nascent film industry led him to transition into filmmaking.

As a scriptwriter and director, Baburao contributed to the shaping of Indian cinema. His filmography includes notable titles like Kismet, Sati Mahananda, Maharani, Bala Joban, and Chand ka Tukda. These films, produced between 1929 and 1935, were crucial in establishing the foundations of Indian cinema. Then in 1935, Baburao joined DN Parker, who owned New Jack Printing Press... The magazine, called Filmindia, was launched as a monthly in April 1935.

He was the editor and publisher of India's first english film trade magazine, Filmindia, the first edition of which was published in 1935. He also ran an Urdu magazine "Caravan".

Baburao was also the founder and editor of a political magazine, Mother India (different from the magazine of the same name started by the Aurobindo group). Baburaoji also played a pivotal role in launching & transformation of actress Padma Devi, turning her into a colour queen. Her pictures started appearing in every issue of Film World Magazine, thanks to Baburao, who used to personally write their captions.

He was elected to the Lok Sabha as the Jana Sangh candidate from Shajapur, Madhya Pradesh in 1967.

== Personal life ==
Baburao Patel was born in a Marathi Vanjari political family as Baba Patil to parents Pandurang Rao Patil and Jamuna Devi Patil in the Maswan village, near Mumbai. He changed his surname from Patil to Patel because he mostly dealt with Gujarati community in professional life; and the Gujarati Patel surname is the equivalent of Patil surname found in Maharashtra, as they both signify as "head of the village". His formal education ended in high school, and he often referred to himself as a non-Matriculate. Patel was an autodidact who owned a large library with hundreds of books on varied subjects.

He was married three times. His first wife, Yesubai Patil, hailed from Pathrali village in Boisar, Palghar. She was the stepdaughter of the village’s highly respected Sarpanch (Patil), Gosavi (Devji) Patil. His third wife was singer and actor Sushila Rani Patel (née Tombat), originally from Chennai. He directed her in Draupadi (1944) and Gwalan but both films flopped at the box office.

== Books ==
- The Rosary and the Lamp (1966), Girnar Publications
- Burning Words: A Critical History of Nine Years of Nehru's Rule from 1947 to 1956 (1956), Sumati Publications
- Grey Dust (1949), Sumati Publications
- A Blueprint of Our Defence (1962), Sumati Publications

== Filmography ==
As director & scriptwriter

- Kismet (1929)
- Sati Mahananda (1933)
- Chand ka Tukda (1933-'35)
- Bala Joban (1934)
- Maharani (1934)
- Pardesi Saiyan (1935)
- Draupadi (1944)
- Gwalan (1946)
