= Meena Kumari performances and awards =

List of films of Indian actress Meena Kumari

Meena Kumari filmography
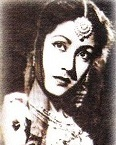
- Meena Kumari
- Film: 93
- Radio show: 1
- Documentary: 1
- Music videos: 1
- Advertising: 1
- Others: 3

Meena Kumari (1 August 1933 – 31 March 1972) was an Indian actress, playback singer, poet, and costume designer who worked in Indian cinema from 1939 to 1972. She began her career as a child artist in the 1939 film Leatherface, credited as Baby Mahjabeen. Over the next six years, she appeared in several films under the screen name Baby Meena before making her debut as Meena Kumari in Bachchon Ka Khel.

Kumari achieved her breakthrough with Baiju Bawra (1952), which established her as a prominent actress, followed by Parineeta (1953), which further consolidated her status in the industry. During the 1950s, she acted in a variety of genres including drama, fantasy, and comedy. She later became most closely associated with tragic roles, which earned her the epithet “Tragedy Queen.”

From the late 1950s to the early 1960s, Meena Kumari appeared in films that often depicted the social and emotional struggles faced by Indian women of the period. Notable among these were Dil Apna Aur Preet Parai (1960), in which she portrayed the “other woman,” Sahib Bibi Aur Ghulam (1962), where she played an alcoholic wife yearning for her husband's attention, and Aarti and Main Chup Rahungi (both 1962). She further consolidated her position with acclaimed performances in Dil Ek Mandir (1963) and Kaajal (1965).

By the late 1960s, Kumari developed a dependence on alcohol, which began to affect her health and was increasingly evident in her screen appearances. Nevertheless, she continued to deliver notable performances in films such as Phool Aur Patthar (1966), Mere Apne (1971), and Pakeezah (1972). The latter, considered her magnum opus, was released only weeks before her death on 31 March 1972, and is widely regarded as her swan song.

In addition to acting, Kumari was also active as a poet, playback singer, and costume designer. She lent her voice to songs in her early films as a child artist, and in 1971 released an album of her poetry titled I Write, I Recite. She also designed the costumes for Pakeezah. Over the course of a 33-year career, she appeared in 93 films, in addition to appearing in an advertisement, a radio programme, and a documentary.

== Films ==
=== As an actor ===
Year	Title	Role	Notes
1939	Leather Face	Baby Mahjabeen	
1939	Adhuri Kahani	Baby Mahjabeen	
1940	Pooja	Bina	
1940	Ek Hi Bhool	Baby Meena	
1941	Nai Roshni	Munni	
1941	Kasauti	Baby Meena	
1941	Bahen	Bina	
1942	Garib	Baby Meena	
1942	Vijay	Baby Meena	
1943	Pratiggya	Baby Meena	
1944	Lal Haveli	Mukta	
1946	Duniya Ek Sarai	Tara	
1946	Bachchon Ka Khel	Anuradha	At 13, Baby Meena made her debut as Meena Kumari
1948	Piya Ghar Aaja		
1948	Bichchade Balam		
1949	Veer Ghatotkach	Surekha	
1950	Shri Ganesh Mahima	Satyabhama	
1950	Magroor	Meenu Rai	
1950	Hamara Ghar		
1951	Sanam	Rani	
1951	Madhosh	Soni	
1951	Laxmi Narayan	The Hindu goddess Laxmi	
1951	Hanuman Patal Vijay	Makari	
1952	Tamasha	Kiran	
1952	Baiju Bawra	Gauri	Won – Filmfare Best Actress Award
1952	Aladdin Aur Jadui Chirag	Princess Badar	
1953	Naulakha Haar	Bijma	
1953	Parineeta	Lalita	Won – Filmfare Best Actress Award
1953	Footpath	Mala	This movie featured in Avijit Ghosh's book, 40 Retakes: Bollywood Classics You May Have Missed.
1953	Do Bigha Zamin	Thakurain	The first Indian film to win the International Prize at Cannes in 1954. The film also marks Kumari's maiden guest appearance.
1953	Daana Paani		
1953	Daaera	Sheetal	
1954	Ilzaam	Kamli	
1954	Chandni Chowk	Zareena Begum	
1954	Baadbaan		
1955	Rukhsana	Rukhsana	
1955	Adl-e-Jehangir	Zareena	
1955	Bandish	Usha Sen	
1955	Azaad	Shobha	Nominated – Filmfare Best Actress Award
1956	Mem Sahib	Meena	
1956	Ek Hi Raasta	Malti	
1956	Satranj	Sandhya	
1956	Naya Andaz	Mala	
1956	Halaku	Nilofer Nadir	
1956	Bandhan	Bani	This film was awarded with a Certificate of Merit in National Film Awards.
1957	Sharada	Sharada	Won – Best Actress Bengal Film Journalists' Association Awards
1957	Miss Mary	Laxmi / Mary	
1958	Sahara	Leela	Nominated – Filmfare Best Actress
1958	Yahudi	Hannah	
1958	Savera	Shanti	
1958	Farishta	Shobha	
1959	Chand	Vimla	
1959	Ardhangini	Chhaya	
1959	Shararat	Shabnam	
1959	Satta Bazaar	Jamuna	
1959	Madhu	Madhu	
1959	Jagir	Jyoti	
1959	Chirag Kahan Roshni Kahan	Ratna	Nominated – Filmfare Best Actress Award
1959	Char Dil Char Rahen	Chavli	
1960	Kohinoor	Princess Chandramukhi	
1960	Dil Apna Aur Preet Parai	Karuna	
1960	Bahana		
1961	Zindagi aur Khwab	Shanti	
1961	Pyaar Ka Saagar	Radha / Rani B Gupta	
1961	Bhabhi Ki Chudiyan	Geeta	The film was one of the highest-grossing films of the year at the Indian Box Office.
1962	Sahib Bibi Aur Ghulam	Chhoti Bahu / Sati Lakshmi	Won – Filmfare Best Actress Award/ Nominated in 13th Berlin International Film Festival & Meena Kumari was selected as a delegate. The film was India's entry to the 36th Academy Awards for Best Foreign Language Film.
1962	Main Chup Rahungi	Gayetri	Nominated – Filmfare Best Actress
1962	Aarti	Aarti Gupta	Won – Best Actress Bengal Film Journalists' Association Awards Nominated Filmfare Best Actress
1963	Kinare Kinare	Neelu	
1963	Dil Ek Mandir	Seeta	Won – Best Actress Bengal Film Journalists' Association Awards Nominated-Filmfare Best Actress
1963	Akeli Mat Jaiyo	Seema	
1964	Benazir	Benazir	
1964	Main Bhi Ladki Hoon	Rajni	
1964	Sanjh Aur Savera	Gauri	
1964	Ghazal	Naaz Ara Begum	
1964	Chitralekha	Chitralekha	Meena Kumari's first colour feature film.
1965	Purnima	Purnima	
1965	Kaajal	Madhavi	Won – Filmfare Best Actress Award
1965	Bheegi Raat	Neelima	
1966	Phool Aur Patthar	Shanti	Nominated – Filmfare Best Actress Award
1966	Pinjre Ke Panchhi	Heena Sharma	
1967	Noorjehan	Mehr-un-Nisa / Noorjehan	
1967	Majhli Didi	Hemangini	The film was India's entry to the 41st Academy Awards for Best Foreign Language Film.
1967	Chandan Ka Palna	Shobha Rai	
1967	Bahu Begum	Zeenat Jahan Begum	
1968	Baharon Ki Manzil	Nanda Roy / Radha Shukla	
1968	Abhilasha	Meena Singh	
1970	Saat Phere		
1970	Jawab	Vidya	
1971	Mere Apne	Anandi Devi	
1972	Dushmun	Malti	
1972	Pakeezah	Nargis / Sahibjaan	Won special Bengal Film Journalists' Association Award and posthumously received her twelfth and last Filmfare nomination.
1972	Gomti Ke Kinare	Ganga	Released posthumously. Credited as Meenaji in her last film.

=== As a playback singer ===
Year	Title	Song	Co-singer (if any)	Lyricist	Music Director	Notes
1941	Bahen	"Tore Kajra Lagaoon Mori Rani..."	Beena Kumari	Dr. Safdar "Aah" Sitapuri	Anil Krishna Biswas	
1946	Dunia Ek Sarai	"Chheen Li Hamri Hansi De Gaye Rona Humko..."	Zohrabai Ambalewali	Kidar Nath Sharma	Hansraj Behl	
1946	Dunia Ek Sarai	"Maa Dekh Ri Maa Badli Huyi Jawan..."	No	Kidar Nath Sharma	Hansraj Behl	
1946	Dunia Ek Sarai	"Saawan Beet Gayo Maayi Ri..."	No	Kidar Nath Sharma	Hansraj Behl	
1948	Piya Ghar Aja	"Desh Paraye Jaanewale Bhool Na Jaana..."	No	Ishwar Chandra Kapoor	Bulo C. Rani	
1948	Piya Ghar Aja	"Ankiyan Taras Rahi Un Bin..."	No	Indra Chandra	Bulo C. Rani	
1948	Piya Ghar Aja	"Mili Aj Piya Se Ankhiyaan..."	No	Indra Chandra	Bulo C. Rani	
1948	Piya Ghar Aja	"Nain Dor Se Bandh Liyo Chitchor..."	Karan Dewan	Indra Chandra	Bulo C. Rani	
1948	Piya Ghar Aja	Nain Base Ho Raja Dil Mein	No	Indra Chandra	Bulo C. Rani	
1948	Bichhade Balam	"Haseeno Ko Dil Mein Basaana Bura Hai..."	A. R. Ojha & Mohammed Farooqui	Indra Chandra	Bulo C. Rani	
1948	Bichhade Balam	"Aata Hai Dil Pyaar Kyun..."	No	Indra Chandra	Bulo C. Rani	
1948	Bichhade Balam	"Ek Aag Lagi Dil Mein..."	No	Indra Chandra	Bulo C. Rani	
1948	Bichhade Balam	"Mere Piya Na Aaye Tarsaaye Re..."	No	Indra Chandra	Bulo C. Rani	
1948	Bichhade Balam	"Bol Re Mere Pyaare Papeehe Bol Re..."	No	Indra Chandra	Bulo C. Rani	
1948	Bichhade Balam	"Haaye Piya Mujhe Lalchaye Jiya..."	No	Indra Chandra	Bulo C. Rani	
1966	Pinjre Ke Panchhi	"Kubda Chadhe Ghodi Aisa Hoga Kabhi..."	Manna Dey	Gulzar	Salil Chowdhury	
1972	Pakeezah	"Leke Angrai..."	Suman Kalyanpur	Kaif Bhopali	Ghulam Mohammed	The song was released in 1977 in album Pakeezah Rang Barang. Meena Kumari recited the introductory couplet of this song. The song in actual is sung by Suman Kalyanpur.

=== As Costume Designer ===
Year	Title
1972	Pakeezah

== Miscellaneous ==
Year	Work	Notes
1953	Dream House	Kumari was in an international Dunlopillo UK Advertisement.
1967	After The Eclipse	Documentary produced by S.Sukhdev featured Kumari's voice.
1967	Jaimala by Meena Kumari	Kumari presented a special radio programme which was broadcast by Radio Ceylon
1971	I Write, I Recite	Consists of her poems under the label of LP Vinyl Record for which Khayyam gave music.
1979	Meena Kumari Ki Amar Kahani	Film dedicated to Kumari was directed by Sohrab Modi and its music was composed by Khayyam.
1980	Shaira	Documentary on Kumari was directed by S.Sukh Dev along with Gulzar and produced by Kanta Sukhdev.
2018	Ajeeb Daastaan Hai Yeh	A play depicting her life was staged at Jawahar Kala Kendra in Jaipur.

== Awards and nominations ==
=== Filmfare Award for Best Actress ===
Year	Film	Role	Result
1954	Baiju Bawra	Gauri	Won
1955	Parineeta	Lalita	Won
1956	Azaad	Shobha	Nominated
1959	Sahara	Leela	Nominated
1960	Chirag Kahan Roshni Kahan	Ratna	Nominated
1963	Sahib Bibi Aur Ghulam	Chhoti Bahu	Won
1963	Aarti	Aarti Gupta	Nominated
1963	Main Chup Rahungi	Gayetri	Nominated
1964	Dil Ek Mandir	Sita	Nominated
1966	Kaajal	Madhvi	Won
1967	Phool Aur Patthar	Shanti	Nominated
1973	Pakeezah	Nargis / Sahibjaan	Nominated

=== Filmfare Special Award ===
Year	Note	Result
2025	Cine Icon award for her enduring legacy in Hindi cinema.	Honoured

=== Records ===
- Kumari is the only actress to receive all three nominations in the Filmfare Awards Best Actress category, at the 10th Filmfare Awards in 1963.
- Kumari's record for the highest number of Filmfare awards for Best Actress remained intact for 13 years until it was broken by Nutan at the 26th Filmfare Awards in 1979.
- Her record of 12 nominations in the Best Actress category was broken after 35 years by Madhuri Dixit at the 53rd Filmfare Awards, 2008.
- She is the only actress to be nominated posthumously, for Pakeezah at the 20th Filmfare Awards in 1973. Kumari not winning an award stirred controversy. Filmfare defended their decision by stating that according to their rules, posthumous awards were not allowed. Filmfare's editor B. K. Karanjia said both Ghulam Mohammad (the music director of Pakeezah) and Josef Wirsching (cinematographer) lost for the same reason.

=== Bengal Film Journalists' Association Awards ===
Year	Film	Role	Category	Result
1958	Sharada	Sharada Ram Sharan	Best Actress (Hindi)	Won
1963	Aarti	Aarti Gupta	Best Actress (Hindi)	Won
1965	Dil Ek Mandir	Sita	Best Actress (Hindi)	Won (Note: Tied with Mala Sinha for Jahan Ara.)
1973	Pakeezah	Nargis/ Sahibjaan	Best Actress (Hindi)	Special Award (Note: Kumari was awarded with a Special Award, while Zeenat Aman won the award Best Actress (Hindi) for Haré Rama Haré Krishna.)

=== Shama-Sushma Film Awards ===
Year	Film	Role	Category	Result	Ref(s)
1973	Pakeezah	Nargis/Sahibjaan	Best Actress	Won	
