= List of Hindi films of 1959 =

A list of films produced by the Bollywood film industry based in Mumbai in 1959:

== Highest-grossing films ==
The ten highest-grossing films at the Indian box office in 1959:

Rank	Title	Gross collection
1	Anari	₹3 crore
2	Paigham	₹2.80 crore
3	Navrang	₹2.50 crore
4	Dhool Ka Phool	₹2 crore
5	Goonj Uthi Shehnai	₹1.80 crore
6	Dil Deke Dekho	₹1.60 crore
7	Sujata	₹1.30 crore
8	Chhoti Bahen	₹1.20 crore
9	Rani Roopmati	₹1.15 crore
10	Chirag Kahan Roshni Kahan	₹1.10 crore

== A-D ==
Title	Director	Cast	Genre	Notes
Aangan	O. P. Dutta	Rehman, Ameeta, Chand Usmani, Leela Mishra, Badri Prasad	Family Drama	Music: Roshan Lyrics: Rajendra Krishan, Pandit Indra, Avinash
Amar Shaheed	B. R. Panthulu	Sivaji Ganesan, Padmini, Gemini Ganesan, Ragini	Biographical Patriotic Drama	Music: Vinod Lyrics: Aziz Kashmiri
Anari	Hrishikesh Mukherjee	Raj Kapoor, Nutan, Lalita Pawar, Motilal, Shubha Khote	Social Romance	Music: Shankar Jaikishan Lyrics: Hasrat Jaipuri, Shailendra
Ardhangini	Ajit Chakrabarty	Raaj Kumar, Meena Kumari, Agha, Durga Khote	Family Drama	Music: Vasant Desai Lyrics: Majrooh Sultanpuri
Baap Bete	Raja Paranjpe	Ashok Kumar, Shyama, Chitra, Ramesh Deo, Jagdeep	Family Drama	Music: Madan Mohan Lyrics: Rajendra Krishan
Baazigar	Nanabhai Bhatt	Jairaj, Nirupa Roy, Sunder, Helen, Naaz, Tiwari	Action Costume Drama	Music: Chitragupta Lyrics: Prem Dhawan
Bank Manager	Rakhan	Kamini Kaushal, Shekhar, K. N. Singh, Radhakishan, Tun Tun	Social Family	Music: Madan Mohan Lyrics: Jalal Malihabadi, Anwar Farrukhabadi, Indeevar
Barkha	Krishnan–Panju	Nanda, Jagdeep, Shubha Khote, Anant Kumar, David, Ulhas	Social Family	Music: Chitragupta Lyrics: Rajendra Krishan
Bedard Zamana Kya Jaane	Babubhai Mistri	Ashok Kumar, Nirupa Roy, Jabeen, Soodesh Kumar, Pran	Family Social	Music: Kalyanji Virji Shah Lyrics: Bharat Vyas
Bhagwan Aur Shaitaan	Manmohan Sabir	Sheila Ramani, Jairaj, Sunder, Achala Sachdev, Nazir Kashmiri		Music: S. Mohinder Lyrics: Manmohan Sabir
Bhai Bahen	G. P. Sippy	Naaz, Rehman, Daisy Irani, Kamaljeet, Nishi, Johnny Walker, Shammi	Family Drama	Music: N. Dutta Lyrics: Sahir Ludhianvi, Raja Mehdi Ali Khan for "Saare Jahan Se Achha Hindustan Hamara"
Black Cat	N. A. Ansari	Balraj Sahni, Minu Mumtaz, Johnny Walker, N. A. Ansari, Shammi, Tun Tun	Thriller Drama	Music: N. Dutta Lyrics: Jan Nisar Akhtar
Blackmailer	Sultan	Amarnath, Shanta Kumari, Kanchanmala, Johnny Whisky	Suspense Thriller	Music: Iqbal Lyrics: Bahaar Ajmeri
Bus Conductor	Dwarka Khosla	Premnath, Shyama, Amarnath, Surya Kumar, Sheela Vaz, Kanchanmala, Cuckoo	Social Action	Music: Bipin Babul Lyrics: Noor Devasi
C. I. D. Girl	Ravindra Dave	Geeta Bali, Balraj Sahni, Subiraj, Mohan Choti, Helen, Kanhaiyalal	Social Action Drama	Music: Roshan Lyrics: Anand Bakshi, Hasrat Jaipuri
Chacha Zindabad	Om Prakash	Kishore Kumar, Anita Guha, Om Prakash, Anoop Kumar, Manorama, Bhagwan, Tun Tun, Sunder	Family Comedy	Music: Madan Mohan Lyrics: Rajendra Krishan
Chand	Lekhraj Bhakri	Meena Kumari, Balraj Sahni, Manoj Kumar, Kuldip Kaur, Vijaya Choudhary, Helen, Sunder	Family Drama	Music: Hemant Kumar Lyrics: Shailendra, Bharat Vyas, Akhtar Lakhnavi
Chandrasena	Babubhai Mistri	Mahipal, Krishna Kumari, B. M. Vyas, Kanchanmala, Sunder	Costume Devotional	Music: Kalyanji Anandji Lyrics: Indeevar
Char Dil Char Rahen	Khwaja Ahmad Abbas	Raj Kapoor, Meena Kumari, Shammi Kapoor, Ajit, Nimmi, Kumkum, David, Achala Sachdev, Jairaj	Social Drama Romance	Music: Anil Biswas, Lyrics: Sahir Ludhianvi
Charnon Ki Dasi	Ramesh Vyas	Manhar Desai, Nirupa Roy, Jayshree Gadkar, Madan Puri, Amirbai Karnatki, Leela Mishra	Family Drama	Music: Avinash Vyas Lyrics: Bharat Vyas
Chhoti Bahen	L. V. Prasad	Nanda, Balraj Sahni, Rehman, Shyama	Family Drama	Music: Shankar Jaikishan Lyrics: Shailendra, Hasrat Jaipuri
Chini Jadugar	Noshir Engineer	Ajit, Krishna Kumari, Kamran, Sulochana, Nazir Kashmiri	Action	Music: Shafi M Nagri Lyrics: Akhtar Romani
Chirag Kahan Roshni Kahan	Devendra Goel	Rajendra Kumar, Meena Kumari, Honey Irani, Minu Mumtaz, Madan Puri	Family Drama	Music: Ravi Lyrics: Prem Dhawan, Ravi for "Tim Tim Karte Taare"
Circus Queen	Noshir Engineer	Nadia, John Cawas, Nilofar, Samar Roy	Action Thriller	Music: Shafi M Nagri Lyrics: Naqsh Lyallpuri
Commander	Kedar Kapoor	Ranjan, Kumkum, Nigar Sultana, Kamal Kapoor, Helen, Tiwari	Action	Music: Chitragupta Lyrics: Sarshar Sailani
Daaka	Nanabhai Bhatt	Ashok Kumar, Nirupa Roy, Smriti Biswas, Pran	Crime Drama	Music: Chitragupta Lyrics: Prem Dhawan, Majrooh Sultanpuri
Deep Jalta Rahe	Datta Dharmadhikari	Abhi Bhattacharya, Sabita Chatterjee, Badri Prasad, Randhir	Drama	Music: Roshan Lyrics: Shailendra
Dhool Ka Phool	Yash Chopra	Rajendra Kumar, Mala Sinha, Nanda, Manmohan Krishna, Jagdish Raj, Leela Chitnis	Social Family Drama	Music: N. Dutta Lyrics: Sahir Ludhianvi
Didi	N. Narayan Kale	Sunil Dutt, Shubha Khote, Jayshree, Feroz Khan, Om Prakash, Daisy Irani	Family Drama	Music: N. Dutta and Sudha Malhotra forTum Mujhe Bhool Bhi Jao Lyrics: Sahir Ludhianvi
Dil Deke Dekho	Nasir Hussain	Shammi Kapoor, Asha Parekh, Rajendra Nath, Sulochana, Raj Mehra	Romance Musical	Music: Usha Khanna Lyrics: Majrooh Sultanpuri
Do Behnen	Kedar Kapoor	Rajendra Kumar, Shyama, Jabeen, Radhakishen, Mumtaz, Leela Mishra, Chand Usmani, Padmini Priyadarshini	Family Drama	Music: Vasant Desai Lyrics: Pradeep
Do Gunde	V. M. Vyas	Raaj Kumar, Ajit, Pran, Kumkum, Jayshree Gadkar, Daisy Irani, Subiraj	Action	Music: Ghulam Mohammad Lyrics: Majrooh Sultanpuri
Do Ustad	Tara Harish	Madhubala, Raj Kapoor, Sheikh Mukhtar, Sulochana, Daisy Irani	Comedy Action	Music: O. P. Nayyar Lyrics: Qamar Jalalabadi
Dr. Z	Jal	Nirupa Roy, Mahipal, Shakila, Krishna Kumari, Helen, Hiralal	Action Thriller	Music: Manohar Lyrics: Akhtar Romani
Duniya Na Mane	V. Avadhoot	Mala Sinha, Pradeep Kumar, Sheikh Mukhtar, Sulochana, Daisy Irani, Minu Mumtaz, Helen	Social	Music: Madan Mohan Lyrics: Rajendra Krishan

== E-M ==
Title	Director	Cast	Genre	Notes
Ek Armaan Mera	Gunjal	Jayshree Gadkar, Sohan Kapila, Malika, Sabita Chatterjee	Fantasy	Music: S. D. Batish Lyrics: Madhusudan Bhagalpuri, Anand Bakshi, Kaifi Irani
Fashionable Wife	B. K. Adarsh	Abhi Bhattacharya, Jaymala, Anoop Kumar, Nazir Hussain, Radhakrishan, Manorama	Social	Music: Suresh Talwar Lyrics: Bharat Vyas
Forty Days	Dwarka Khosla	Premnath, Shakila, Nishi, K. N. Singh, Bhagwan, Cuckoo	Action Suspense	Music: Babul Lyrics; Kaifi Azmi
Ghar Ghar Ki Baat	Ravindra Dave	Suresh, Krishna Kumari	Family Drama	Music: Kalyanji Virji Shah Lyrics: Gulshan Bawra
Gokul Ka Chor	Vasant Painter	Kumkum, Ratnamala, Mohan Choti, Hiralal, Sulochana	Devotional	Music: Sudhir Phadke Lyrics: Narendra Sharma, Qamar Jalalabadi
Goonj Uthi Shehnai	Vijay Bhatt	Rajendra Kumar, Ameeta, Anita Guha, I. S. Johar, Manmohan Krishna, Ulhas, Prem Dhawan	Musical Romance Drama	Music: Vasant Desai Lyrics: Bharat Vyas
Grihalakshmi	Raman B. Desai	Shahu Modak, Pandharibai, Nazir, Bipin Gupta, Lalita Pawar	Family Drama	Music: Avinash Vyas Lyrics: Bharat Vyas
Guest House	Ravindra Dave	Ajit, Shakila, Pran, Lalita Pawar, Lillian, Tiwari, Helen	Suspense Drama	Music: Chitragupta Lyrics: Prem Dhawan
Heera Moti	Krishan Chopra	Balraj Sahni, Nirupa Roy, Shubha Khote, Naaz, Helen	Family Social Drama	Based On Munshi Premchand's short story: Do Bailon Ki Katha Music: Roshan Lyrics: Prem Dhawan
Hero No.1	Sultan	Kamran, Heera Sawant, Habib, Naazi, Tun Tun	Action	Music: Iqbal Lyrics: Muzaffar Shahjahanpuri
Hum Bhi Insaan Hain	Robin Majumdar	Abhi Bhattacharya, Samar Roy, Kumar, Lata Sinha, Lalita Kumari, Dhumal, Madhumati	Social	Music: Hemant Kumar, Lyrics: Shailendra
Hunterwali	B. J. Patel	John Cawas, Boman Shroff, Mehroo, Samar Roy	Action Costume	Music: Harbans Bahl Lyrics: Shaad
Insan Jaag Utha	Shakti Samanta	Sunil Dutt, Madhubala, Madan Puri, Nishi, Shyama, Minu Mumtaz, Bipin Gupta	Social	Music: S. D. Burman Lyrics: Shailendra
Jaal Saaz	Arvind Sen	Kishore Kumar, Mala Sinha, Pran, Shyama, Sabita Chatterjee, Nazir Hussain, Helen	Social Action	Music: Datta Naik Lyrics: Majrooh Sultanpuri
Jagga Daku	Chandrakant	Prithviraj Kapoor, Jairaj, Chandrashekhar, Dara Singh, Jabeen, Minu Mumtaz	Action	Music: S. N. Tripathi Lyrics: Bharat Vyas
Jagir	Jag Mohan Mattu	Meena Kumari, Premnath, Kuldip Kaur, Mehmood, Minu Mumtaz, Ulhas, Sheela Vaz	Family Drama	Music: Madan Mohan Lyrics: Raja Mehdi Ali Khan
Jawani Ki Hawa	M. Sadiq	Vyjayanthimala, Pradeep Kumar, Shammi, Purnima, Helen	Social	Music: Ravi Lyrics: Rajendra Krishan, Shailendra
Jungle King	Masood	Sheila Ramani, Anwar, Manju, Tun Tun, Pramila	Action Adventure	Music: Bipin Babul Lyrics: Anjum Jaipuri
Kaagaz Ke Phool	Guru Dutt	Guru Dutt, Waheeda Rehman, Naaz (as Baby Naaz), Johnny Walker, Veena, Mehmood, Tun Tun	Romance Social	Music: S. D. Burman Lyrics: Kaifi Azmi
Kal Hamara Hai	S. K. Prabhakar	Madhubala, Bharat Bhushan, Jayant, Hari Shivdasani	Social	Music: Chitragupta Lyrics: Shailendra
Kali Topi Lal Rumal	Tara Harish	Chandrashekhar, Shakila, Agha, Mukri, K. N. Singh, Kumkum	Social	Music: Chitragupta Lyrics: Majrooh Sultanpuri
Kangan	Nanabhai Bhatt	Ashok Kumar, Nirupa Roy, Daisy Irani, Manhar Desai, Shammi, Bhagwan, Tiwari	Family Social	Music: Chitragupta, Lyrics: Rajendra Krishan
Kanhaiya	Om Prakash	Nutan, Raj Kapoor, Lalita Pawar, Om Prakash, Madan Puri, Pachhi	Social	Music: Shankar Jaikishan Lyrics: Shailendra, Hasrat Jaipuri
Kavi Kalidas	S. N. Tripathi	Nirupa Roy, Bharat Bhushan, Anita Guha, Sapru, Tun Tun, S. N. Tripathi	Devotional	Music: S. N. Tripathi Lyrics: Bharat Vyas
Keechak Vadha a.k.a. Sairandhari	Tara Harish, Yashwant Pethkar	Chandrashekhar, Shakeela, K. N. Singh, Agha, Mukri, Helen	Mythological	Music: Master Krishnarao Lyrics: Bharat Vyas, Saraswati Kumar Deepak
Khoobsurat Dhokha	Ram Prakash	Ravindra Kapoor, Shashikala, Jayant, B. M. Vyas, Sunder	Action Adventure	Music: S. Mohinder Lyrics: Indeevar, Anand Bakshi, Rahil Gorakhpuri
Kya Ye Bombay Hai	Nanubhai Vakil	Nishi, Maruti, W. M. Khan, Tun Tun, Jeevankala, Lillian	Action	Music: Bipin Datta Lyrics: Noor Devasi
Lady Robinhood	B. J. Patel	Nilofar, Samar Roy, Rajan Kapoor, Shakila Bano Bhopali, Tun Tun, Mirajkar	Action	Music: Sardul Kwatra Lyrics: Bandhu, Shakeel Nomani, Bekal Amritsari, Aziz Kashmiri, Anand Bakshi
Love Marriage	Subodh Mukherjee	Dev Anand, Mala Sinha, Suresh, Pronoti, Kanchanmala		Music: Shankar Jaikishan Lyrics: Hasrat Jaipuri, Shailendra
Maa Ke Aansoo	Dhirubhai Desai	Ajit, Nalini Jaywant, Agha, Lalita Pawar, Cuckoo	Family	Music: Sardar Malik Lyrics: Madan Mohan, Raja Mehdi Ali Khan
Madam XYZ	Nanabhai Bhatt	Suresh, Shakila, Pran, Nalini Chonker, David, Purnima	Suspense Action	Music: Chitragupta Lyrics: Prem Dhawan
Madari	Babubhai Mistri	Ranjan, Chitra, Jayshree Gadkar, Manhar Desai, Sunder, Sheela Vaz	Action Drama	Music: Kalayanji Anandji Lyrics: Indeevar, Faruk Kaiser, Madhur
Madhu	Gyan Mukherjee, S. Bannerjee	Karan Dewan, Meena Kumari, Kumkum, Tun Tun, Jagdish Sethi, Sheela Vaz	Social	Music: Roshan Lyrics: Shailendra, Prem Dhawan, Naqsh Lyallpuri
Main Nashe Mein Hoon	Naresh Saigal	Raj Kapoor, Mala Sinha, Nishi, Nazir Hussain, Purnima, Dhumal, Helen	Social	Music: Shankar Jaikishan Lyrics: Shailendra, Hasrat Jaipuri
Maine Jeena Seekh Liya	Satish Nigam	Ravinder Kapoor, Ameeta, Murad, Durga Khote, Agha, Sushil Kumar	Social Drama	Music: Roshan Lyrics: Rahil Gorakhpuri
Minister	Raman B. Desai	Sohrab Modi, Roopmala, Bhagwan, Om Prakash, Jeevan, Sulochana, Murad, Gopi Krishna	Social	Music: Madan Mohan Lyrics: Rajendra Krishan
Mohar	P. Jairaj	Shammi Kapoor, Geeta Bali, Kuldip Kaur, Minu Mumtaz, Lalita Pawar, Tiwari	Action Drama	Music: Madan Mohan Lyrics: Rajendra Krishan
Mr. John	Inder	Shyama, Johnny Walker, Helen, Mohan Choti, Iftekhar, Lalita Pawar	Comedy	Music: Datta Naik Lyrics: Jan Nisar Akhtar

== N-Z ==
Title	Director	Cast	Genre	Notes
Naach Ghar	R. S. Tara	Ashok Kumar, Anoop Kumar, Shubha Khote, Dhumal, Gopi Krishna, Iftekhar, Helen	Social Drama	Music: N. Dutta Lyrics: Sahir Ludhianvi
Nai Raahen	Brij Sadanah	Ashok Kumar, Geeta Bali, Shubha Khote, Anoop Kumar, Madan Puri, Radhakishen, Nazir Hussain		Music: Ravi Lyrics: Shailendra, Majrooh Sultanpuri, Prem Dhawan
Navrang	V. Shantaram	Mahipal, Sandhya, Keshavrao Date, Vandana, Ulhas, Agha, Jeetendra	Social	Music: C. Ramachandra Lyrics: Bharat Vyas
Naya Sansar	Nanabhai Bhatt	Pradeep Kumar, Nanda, Jayshree Gadkar, Tun Tun, Dhumal, Sheela Vaz, Sunder, Shammi	Social	Music: Chitragupta Lyrics: Rajendra Krishan
O Tera Kya Kahna	K. Parvez	Sheikh Mukhtar, Chitra, Mehmood, Bhagwan, Helen, Kammo	Comedy Social	Music: Kalyanji Virji Shah Lyrics: Indeevar, Hasrat Jaipuri Gulshan Bawra
Paigham	S. S. Vasan	Dilip Kumar, Vyjayanthimala, Raaj Kumar, B. Saroja Devi, Motilal, Minu Mumtaz, Johnny Walker	Social Drama	Music: C. Ramchandra Lyrics: Pradeep
Pakshiraj	S. N. Tripathi	Nirupa Roy, Manhar Desai, Ulhas, S. N. Tripathi	Mythology	Music: S. N. Tripathi Lyrics: Qamar Jalalabadi, B. D. Mishra, J. S. Kashyap
Pehli Raat	P. L. Santoshi	Nimmi, Rehman, Nanda, Sohrab Modi, Soodesh Kumar, Johnny Walker, Jeevan, Lalita Pawar	Family Drama	Music: Ravi Lyrics: Majrooh Sultanpuri
Pyar Ki Rahen	Lekhraj Bhakri	Pradeep Kumar, Anita Guha, Pran, Kuldip Kaur, Helen, Om Prakash, Jeevan, Sunder, Tiwari	Family Social	Music: Kanu Ghosh Lyrics: Prem Dhawan
Qaidi No. 911	Aspi Irani	Sheikh Mukhtar, Nanda, Mehmood, Daisy Irani, Honey Irani, Minu Mumtaz, Tun Tun, Achala Sachdev, Hiralal	Crime Social	Music: Dattaram Lyrics: Hasrat Jaipuri
Raat Ke Rahi	Naseem	Shammi Kapoor, Jabeen, Iftekhar, Nazir Hussain, Achala Sachdev, Anwar Hussain	Crime Drama Romance	Music: Jaidev, Bipin Babul Lyrics: Vishwamitra Adil
Sahil	Kulbhushan Agarwal	Shammi Kapoor, Chitra, Kuldip Kaur, Murad, Sapru, Jankidas	Drama Romance	Music: Suresh Talwar, D. S. Dutt Lyrics: Indeevar, Janardan Muktidoot, Kulbhushan, Taban Jhansvi, Anjaan
Samrat Prithviraj Chauhan	Harsukh Bhatt	Jairaj, Anita Guha, Prem Adib, Ulhas, Sapru, B. M. Vyas, Leela Mishra	Historical Epic	Music: Vasant Desai Lyrics: Bharat Vyas
Santan	Jyoti Swaroop	Rajendra Kumar, Kamini Kadam, Nazir Hussain, David, Leela Mishra, Manorama	Family Social	Music: Dattaram Lyrics: Hasrat Jaipuri
Sati Vaishalini	Sadhu Singh	Trilok Kapoor, Krishna Kumari, Tiwari, Lalita Pawar, Kamal Kapoor, Sulochana	Devotional	Music: Premnath Lyrics: Bharat Vyas
Satta Bazaar	Ravindra Dave	Balraj Sahni, Meena Kumari, Suresh, Vijaya Choudhary, Johnny Walker, Tiwari, Asit Sen	Family Social	Music: Kalyanji Anandji Lyrics: Shailendra, Hasrat Jaipuri, Indeevar, Gulshan Bawra
Sawan	R. Riwari	Bharat Bhushan, Ameeta, Achala Sachdev, Jeevan, Tiwari, Helen	Romance Musical	Music: Hansraj Behl Lyrics: Prem Dhawan
Sazish	Surya Kumar	Ranjan, Nalini Chonkar, B. M. Vyas, Randhir	Action Social	Music: S. D. Batish Lyrics: Qamar Jalalabadi
School Master	B. R. Panthulu	Karan Dewan, Shakila, B. Saroja Devi, Kamini Kadam, Jawahar Kaul, B. R. Panthalu	Social Family	Music: Vasant Desai Lyrics: Pradeep
Shararat	H. S. Rawail	Kishore Kumar, Raaj Kumar, Meena Kumari, Kumkum, Rajendra Nath, Sunder, Nazir Kashmiri	Comedy	Music: Shankar Jaikishan Lyrics: Shailendra, Hasrat Jaipuri
Sujata	Bimal Roy	Nutan, Sunil Dutt, Shashikala, Sulochana, Lalita Pawar, Tarun Bose, Baby Farida	Social Family	Music: S. D. Burman Lyrics: Majrooh Sultanpuri
Swarg Se Sundar Desh Hamara	Pravin Kumar	Raaj Kumar, Sarita, Kanhaiyalal	Social	Music: S. Banerjee
Tikdambaaz	Shriram Bohra	Nigar Sultana, Mahipal, Tiwari, Rajan Kapoor, Lillian		Music: B. N. Bali Lyrics: Madan Mohan
Tipu Sultan	Jagdish Gautam	Jairaj, Anita Guha, Suresh, Krishna Kumari, Roopmala, Nazir Kashmiri	Historical	Music: S. D. Batish Lyrics: Qamar Jalalabadi
Ujala	Naresh Saigal	Shammi Kapoor, Mala Sinha, Raaj Kumar, Kumkum, Leela Chitnis, Dhumal	Social Romance	Music: Shankar Jaikishan Lyrics: Shailendra, Hasrat Jaipuri
Zara Bachke	N. A. Ansari	Suresh, Nanda, Johnny Walker, Murad, Sapru, Anwar Hussain, Tun Tun, Helen, Tony Walker, Nilofar	Action Drama	Music: Nashad (Shaukat Dehlvi Nashad) Lyrics: Asad Bhopali, Raja Mehdi Ali Khan, Khumar Barabankvi
