= Piya Ghar Aaja =

- Directed by: Prahlad Dutt
- Starring: Meena Kumari; Karan Dewan; Agha
- Music by: Bulo C Rani; Pandit Indra Chandra (lyrics)
- Production company: Ranjit Movietone
- Release date: 23 April 1948
- Country: India
- Language: Hindi

Piya Ghar Aaja is an Indian film directed by Prahlad Dutt and starring Meena Kumari, Karan Dewan, Saroj, Agha Jaan and Mohantara Talpade. Meena Kumari also lent her voice for playback and sang seven songs in this film. The film was released on 23 April 1948. Incidentally, the film's original title was "Jalan".

== Plot ==
Karan Dewan, a medical student marries the niece (Meena Kumari) of a lawyer without the consent of their respective families. However, there is no opposition to the marriage from the respective families. After some time, complications develop in their married life due to a jealous sister-in-law (Bhabhi) who wanted Karan to marry her sister. The jealously becomes the main theme of the film with melodrama interspersed with some comical situations by Agha. At the end, everything is well settled.

== Soundtrack ==
Track #	Song	Singer(s)	Lyrics	Composer
1	"Ek Baar Phir Kaho"	Meena Kumari	Pandit Indra Chandra	Bulo C. Rani
2	"Na Koi Dilaasa Ha"	Meena Kumari	Pandit Indra Chandra	Bulo C. Rani
3	"Ankiyan Taras Rahi Piya"	Meena Kumari	Pandit Indra Chandra	Bulo C. Rani
4	"Nain Base Ho Raja Dil Mein"	Meena Kumari	Pandit Indra Chandra	Bulo C. Rani
5	"Desh Paraye Jaanewale Bhool"	Meena Kumari	Pandit Indra Chandra	Bulo C. Rani
6	"Nain Dor Se Bandh Liyo Chitchor"	Meena Kumari, Karan Diwan	Pandit Indra Chandra	Bulo C. Rani
7	"Mere Sapnon Ki Duniya Basanewale"	Meena Kumari	Pandit Indra Chandra	Bulo C. Rani
8	"Na Koi Dilasa Hai" version 2	Mohantara Talpade	Pandit Indra Chandra	Bulo C. Rani
9	"Dil Mera Loot Liya Haay"	Saroj, Agha Jaan	Pandit Indra Chandra	Bulo C. Rani
10	"Mili Aj Piya Se Ankhiyaan"	Meena Kumari	Pandit Indra Chandra	Bulo C. Rani
