= Lal Haveli (film) =

1944 film

- Song synopsis booklet cover
- Directed by: K. B. Lall
- Written by: R. S. Chowdhury
- Produced by: Bombay Cinetone Limited
- Starring: Noor Jehan; Surendra; Yakub; Kanhaiyalal; Meena Kumari
- Cinematography: Faredoon Irani
- Edited by: Shamsudin Kadri
- Music by: Mir Saheb
- Release date: 15 December 1944
- Running time: 111 minutes
- Country: India
- Language: Hindi

Lal Haveli (The Red Bungalow) is a Bollywood film. It was released on 15 December 1944.

The film was directed by K. B. Lall, for whom it was a debut directorial venture. Lall had started his career playing a villain in Sohrab Modi's Bharosa (1940), and as a "storywriter" with the V. C. Desai directed film Radhika (1941), finally producing Savera (1942) directed by V. C. Desai, before turning his hand at direction with Lal Haveli.

The film's story was written by R. S. Chowdhury with dialogues by Wajahat Mirza and Agha Jani Kashmiri. Music was composed by Mir Saheb with lyrics by Shums Lacknowi. Faredoon Irani was the chief cinematographer. The cast included Noor Jehan, Surendra, Yakub, Kanhaiyalal, Ulhas, Vatsala Kumtekar and Baby Meena Kumari playing the role of the younger Noor Jehan.

The film is set in Northern India, and involves a feudal patriarch, who though facing monetary problems continues a pretense of the old days. His older daughter elopes with a soldier and the younger daughter is in love with the son of an ex-soldier living in the village.

== Plot ==
The aristocratic Thakur (Badri Prasad), lives in the Lal Haveli (Red Mansion) with his younger daughter Mukta (Noor Jehan). The Thakur's honour has taken a tragic hit when his older daughter, Lal Kunwar elopes with a common soldier. Though the house is run in the old lavish manner, there is shortage of funds, with the mansion being mortgaged to an old Rajput friend, Lacchman Singh.

Mukta and Anand (Surendra) have been childhood friends, who fall in love when they grow up and vow to marry. Anand is the unemployed son of an ex-soldier and a near neighbour of Mukta. Manglu (Yakub), a rough-neck but street smart, is a close friend of Anand and the two are always together, and helpful to each other.

Thakur asks Mukta to attend the wedding of Lachhman Singh's daughter in the city. There she meets the suave Jawahar, Lachhman's son, who falls in love with her and wants to marry her. Her father is pleased with the idea, especially since he's in debt to Lachhman. Mukta agrees to the pleas of her ailing father. Jawahar comes for a visit to the Thakur's house and Anand in a jealous rage shoots at him, wounding him grievously. Manglu and Anand then leave the village and join the army from where they are sent to war.

The injured Jawahar requires blood transfusion to save his life. Mukta's blood matches and she is able to help Jawahar by donating her blood. At the marriage ceremony, the Pandit (priest) (Kanhaiyalal), stops the wedding saying that since Mukta's blood runs in Jawahar’s body, they are now brother and sister. This reasoning appeals to the old-fashioned Thakur, who calls off the wedding. Anand receives an injury during the war and is sent home from the army. Manglu too comes back bringing a nurse he met in the hospital as his bride. Finally, Jawahar, after some initial resistance accepts Mukta as his sister and gives her hand in marriage to Anand.

== Cast ==
- Noor Jehan as Mukta
- Surendra as Anand
- Yakub as Manglu, Anand's friend
- Ulhas as Jawahar
- Kanhaiyalal as Chacha (Uncle)
- Maya Banerji
- Vatsala Kumtekar
- Badri Prasad as Mukta's father
- Ghory
- Meena Kumari as 'young Mukta'
- Brijrani
- Alaknanda

== Review and reception ==
Lal Haveli was released on 15 December 1944, at the Capitol cinema, Bombay. The film's review described it as "Dull And Bright - Yet Entertaining", the direction was stated to be "good in bits" but with "poor production values". The music, composed by Mir Saheb was "good throughout". Among the actors, Yakub and Kanhaiyalal were commended with "easily beat the others" in acting. The over-all comment was "Lal Haveli continues to entertain throughout its length because the basic plot has some natural suspense in it".

Lal Haveli is counted as actor Surendra's one of top "three superhits", the other two being Bharthari (1944) and Anmol Ghadi (1946). For Yakub, who was stated to be a "most forbidding screen villain" and therefore a "much-in-demand" actor for villain roles, the film was a popular shift to non-villainous comedy role. The success of the film, called a "runaway hit" was attributed to the comedy element largely infused in the story by Yakub playing the role of Surendra's friend. The chemistry between the two actors was appreciated by the audiences, especially in scenes where they tease the Pandit, played by Kanhaiyalal.

== Soundtrack ==
Music was composed by Mir Saheb with lyrics written by Shums Lucknowi. One of the notable songs was "Teri Yaad Aayi" sung by Noor Jehan.

Surendra and Noor Jehan had a couple of "memorable" duets "Dil Leke Mukar Na Jaana" and "Mohania Sundar Mukhra Khol". The singers were Noor Jehan, Surendra, and C. Ramchandra. One of the songs in Noor Jehan's voice, "Aao Mere Pyaare Sanwariya" was composed by C. Ramchandra who was then assisting Mir Saheb in music direction. It's the only song credited to have been recorded between composer Ramchandra and Noor Jehan.

=== Songlist ===
| # | Title | Singer |
|---|---|---|
| 1 | "Arzi Sajan Par Dilwaye Doongi" | |
| 2 | "Banti Nazar Aati Nahin Tadbir Hamari" | Noor Jehan |
| 3 | "Bhaiya Hamaaro Ji Aayein Hain Behanein" | Noor Jehan |
| 4 | "Teri Yaad Aaye Sawariya" | Noor Jehan |
| 5 | "Hasino Ki Galiyon Ke Hote Hain Phere (Yehi Fiqr Hai)" | Surendra |
| 6 | "Kyun Man Dhunde Prem Nadi Ka Kinara" | Surendra |
| 7 | "Dil Le Ke Mukar Na Jana" | Surendra, Noor Jehan |
| 8 | "Mohaniya Sundar Mukhada Khol " | Surendra, Noor Jehan |
| 9 | "Tum Bhool Ke Phande Mein Hasino Ke Na Aana" | C. Ramchandra |
| 10 | "Mohe Le Chal Balam Mele Mein" | Vatsala Kumtekar |
| 11 | "Ga Re Panchi Ga" | Surendra, Noor Jehan |
