= Shararat (1959 film) =

1959 film by H. S. Rawail

- DVD cover
- Directed by: H. S. Rawail
- Written by: H. S. Rawail
- Produced by: H. S. Rawail
- Starring: Raaj Kumar; Kishore Kumar; Meena Kumari; Kumkum
- Cinematography: Surya Kumar; Herman Benjamin
- Music by: Shankar–Jaikishan
- Production company: Kardar Studios
- Distributed by: Roshni Films
- Release date: 1959
- Running time: 140-minute
- Country: India
- Language: Hindi

Shararat (meaning "Mischief") is a 1959 Hindi romantic drama film written, produced and directed by H. S. Rawail. It stars Raaj Kumar, Kishore Kumar, Meena Kumari, Kumkum in lead roles, with the memorable song "Hum Matwale Naujawan" sung by Kishore Kumar. Here, Meena Kumari matched the boisterous Kishore Kumar. This film is also unique because in addition to Kishore Kumar singing his own songs, two versions of a classical raga based song ("Ajab Hai Daastaan Teri Yeh Zindagi") that were picturized on Kishore Kumar were sung by Mohammad Rafi, on Kishore Kumar's insistence.

== Plot ==
Chandan and Shabnam are in love and engaged to be married, but Shabnam's father decides to marry her to Suraj. Chandan commits suicide. After her marriage, Shabnam is shocked to find out that Suraj's younger brother Deepak is the spitting image of Chandan. Soon she finds herself being accused of illicit liaisons with Deepak. Deepak leaves home, but a mischief maker engineers a meeting between the two in order to convince Suraj that his wife is being unfaithful to him.

== Cast ==
- Raaj Kumar as Suraj
- Kishore Kumar as Chandan / Deepak (Double Role)
- Meena Kumari as Shabnam
- Kumkum as Jyoti

== Soundtrack ==
Song	Singer
"Hum Matwale Naujawan"	Kishore Kumar
"Khol De Khol De Khidki"	Kishore Kumar
"Tune Mera Dil Liya, Teri Baaton Ne Jaadu Kiya"	Kishore Kumar, Geeta Dutt
"Dekh Aasmaan Mein Chand Muskuraye"	Kishore Kumar, Geeta Dutt
"Ajab Hai Dastaan Teri" - 1	Mohammed Rafi
"Ajab Hai Dastaan Teri" - 2	Mohammed Rafi
"Lushka Lushka Lushka, Lui Lui Sha Lui Lui Sha"	Mohammed Rafi, Lata Mangeshkar
"Tera Teer O Bepeer"	Lata Mangeshkar
"Dekha Babu Chhed Ka"	Lata Mangeshkar
