= Kasauti (1941 film) =

Kasauti (1941)
- Directed by: Ramchandra Thakur
- Starring: Rose, Marutirao Pehalwan, Sunalini, Veena, Satish Batra,
- Release date: 1941
- Country: India
- Language: Hindi

Kasauti (means Criterion) is an Indian film directed by Ramchandra Thakur released in 1941. The film also had Baby Meena (Meena Kumari) as a child artist.

== Plot ==
A bridegroom unwittingly becomes the main suspect in a murder, when it appears he was the last person to see the female victim alive.

== Cast ==
- Rose as Madhuri
- Prahlad as Raju
- Sunalini as Mother
- Veena as Meena (Manjula)
- Satish as Indu
- Meena Kumari (credited as Baby Meena)
- Devi Mukherjee
