= Saat Phere (film) =

1970 film by Sundar Dhar

- Directed by: Sundar Dhar
- Starring: Meena Kumari; Pradeep Kumar; Shyama
- Music by: Sudhir Sen
- Release date: 1970
- Country: India
- Language: Hindi

Saat Phere (transl. Seven rounds) is a 1970 black and white Indian Hindi-language film starring Meena Kumari, Pradeep Kumar and Shyama in lead roles. The film was directed by Sundar Dhar.

== Cast ==
- Meena Kumari
- Pradeep Kumar
- Shyama
- Mukri
- Anwar Hussain
- Roopesh Kumar

== Crew ==
- Director – Sundar Dhar
- Music – Sudhir Sen
- Lyricist – Kaifi Azmi
- Playback Singers – Mohammed Rafi, Asha Bhosle, Usha Mangeshkar, Suman Kalyanpur

== Soundtrack ==
The film had seven songs in it. The music of the film was composed by Sudhir Sen. Kaifi Azmi wrote the lyrics.

1. "Gore Jism Aur Gulabi Gaal Wali" - Mohammed Rafi
2. "Jo Honge Agar" - Mohammed Rafi
3. "Aji Hum Hi To Hai" - Asha Bhosle, Usha Mangeshkar
4. "Ghunghar Baje Saath" - Asha Bhosle
5. "Saji Sej Se Utha Ke" - Suman Kalyanpur
6. "Sata Ke Mujhko Dilruba" - Asha Bhosle
7. "Tumse Dil Ki To Koi Baat" - Asha Bhosle

== See also ==
- Saat phere
