= Satranj (1956 film) =

1956 Indian Hindi-language film

- Directed by: Gyan Mukherjee
- Written by: Gyan Mukherjee (screenplay); Nabendu Ghosh (story); Vrajendra Gaur (dialgoues); Rajendra Krishan (lyrics)
- Produced by: Gyan Mukherjee under Revati Productions
- Starring: Ashok Kumar; Meena Kumari
- Cinematography: K. H. Kapadia
- Edited by: Bimal Roy
- Music by: C. Ramchandra
- Release date: 1956
- Country: India
- Language: Hindi

Satranj (transl. Chess) is a 1956 Indian Hindi-language film directed by Gyan Mukherjee and produced under the banner of Revati Productions. The film stars Ashok Kumar and Meena Kumari; and features a soundtrack composed by C. Ramchandra.

The film premiered at Novelty Theatre of Bombay on 3 August 1956. Satranj received a mixed review from the filmindia critic Baburao Patel, who described it as a non-entertainer and a "good old tale badly told". Another reviewer for The Times of India called it a "poor picture".

== Cast ==
- Ashok Kumar as Shanti Swaroop
- Meena Kumari as Sandhya
- Jagdish Sethi as Chaudhary
- Vijayalakshmi
- Yakub as Kundan
- Nana Palshikar as Mangal
- Nanda Karnataki
- Helen

== Soundtrack ==
While C. Ramchandra provided the music direction, the lyrics were penned by Rajendra Krishan.

Song	Singer(s)
"Chali Bhi Aa Ki Tera Intezaar Kab Se Hai..."	C. Ramchandra
"Jawani Thhi Soyi Sapno Mein Khoyi..."	C. Ramchandra & Asha Bhosle
"Badli Mein Chhupe Chand Ne Kuch Mujhse Kaha Hai..."	Hemant Kumar & Lata Mangeshkar
"Hawa Hai Sard Sard Aur Dil Mein Bhi Hai Dard..." (Part 1)	Lata Mangeshkar
"Hawa Hai Sard Sard Aur Dil Mein Bhi Hai Dard..." (Part 2)	Lata Mangeshkar
"Ke Tu Hai Meri Zindagi Ka Sahara..."	Lata Mangeshkar
"Baaji Kahin Shehnai Aaiyo Ji Aaiyo..."	Asha Bhosle
"Kahan Se Shaam Hote HI..."	Asha Bhosle
