= Footpath (1953 film) =

1953 film

- DVD cover
- Directed by: Zia Sarhadi
- Written by: Zia Sarhadi
- Produced by: Shree Ranjit Movietone
- Starring: Dilip Kumar; Meena Kumari
- Cinematography: M. Rajaram
- Edited by: Shivaji Avdhut
- Music by: Songs: Khayyam; Background Score: Timir Baran
- Production company: Shree Ranjit Movietone
- Distributed by: Shree Ranjit Movietone
- Release date: 9 October 1953
- Country: India
- Language: Hindi

Footpath is a 1953 Hindi romantic drama film written and directed by Zia Sarhadi. It stars Dilip Kumar, Meena Kumari in lead roles. The music of the film is by Khayyam and background score by Timir Baran.

== Box office ==
In India, it was the #5 top-grossing film of 1953.

== Plot ==
The story is about black-marketeering in grains and medicines, a subject of perennial interest to everybody and of poignant importance to the poor and needy. The characters and drama are laid among the very poor, the homeless ones, the pavement dwellers, whence the picture derives its title. One of them, the central character, is a poorly-paid hack journalist named Noshu who lives, for lack of means, with his kindly elder brother Bani and Bani's nasty wife, Minna. Powerfully attracted to a pretty young girl of the neighborhood and wanting desperately to woo and win her, he decides to become a black-marketeer.

The path of the transgressor is laid with roses. He mints money, becomes a wealthy and a respected citizen, and has everything he hankered for in his new world of luxurious ease. It all turns to ashes in his mouth. His brother, who brought him up and who has lost his teacher's job because he used the school's money to finance Noshu's first flutter, turns him out when he discovers what the money was for. So do his poor but honest friends.

With a hardened heart, Noshu goes his own way, becoming more wealthy at each step. Awakening comes with the outbreak of an epidemic among the starving poor. With his racket in medicines, Noshu's conscience stirs in him as he sees the people he loved agonize and die for lack of the drugs he is hoarding for peak prices. The climax comes in his soul when he rushes to his stricken brother's side too late and arrives just as Bani breathes his last. Shocked into realization, Noshu repents, gives himself up to the police, denounces his companions in crime and goes to prison.

== Cast ==
- Dilip Kumar as Noshu
- Meena Kumari as Mala
- Achala Sachdev as Meena
- Anwar Hussain as Ram
- Jankidas as Mathur
- Jagdeep as Pickpocket
- Romi as Monu

== Soundtrack ==
All songs are penned by Majrooh Sultanpuri except " kaisa jadu dala re" which is by Ali Sardar Jafri.

No.	Title	Singer(s)	Length
1.	"Sham-E-Gham Ki Kasam, Aaj Gamghin Hain Hum"	Talat Mahmood
2.	"Suhana Hai Yeh Mausam"	Asha Bhosle
3.	"So Ja Mere Pyare So Ja"	Asha Bhosle
4.	"Kaisa Jadu Dala Re"	Asha Bhosle
5.	"Piya Aaja Re"	Asha Bhosle
