= Pinjre Ke Panchhi =

1966 film by Salil Chowdhury

- Directed by: Salil Chowdhury
- Written by: Story & Screenplay: Salil Chowdhury; Dialogues: Gulzar
- Produced by: M. C. Ananthraj
- Starring: Meena Kumari; Balraj Sahni; Mehmood Ali
- Edited by: Hrishikesh Mukherjee
- Music by: Salil Chowdhury
- Release date: 1966
- Running time: 135 mins
- Country: India
- Language: Hindi

Pinjre Ke Panchhi (transl. The caged birds) is a 1966 Indian Hindi-language film starring Meena Kumari, Balraj Sahni and Mehmood in lead roles. The film marks the directorial debut of ace music director Salil Chowdhury who also gave its music. It was a commercial failure at the box office.

== Plot ==
Sonu (Abhi Bhattacharya), a patient suffering from a rare heart condition falls in love with Heena (Meena Kumari), a young nurse who treats him at the hospital. Soon after they get married, Sonu asks Heena to relocate to a small town where he has rented a house and promises to join her in few days. On reaching the house, Heena meets Sonu's brother Lalu (Mehmood Ali), and his paternal uncle Yasin (Balraj Sahni). Days turn into weeks but Sonu never returns. However, in due course Heena develops an understanding with both Lalu and Yasin. Soon, Heena comes across a letter in which Sonu tells her to marry someone else as he may not live long enough. She also realises that the two men are actually convicts hiding in her house. When Yasin reads the letter, he brings Sonu to the house but somehow Sonu escapes and informs the police. In the climax of the film, Yasin and Lalu manage to take Heena, whose condition has by now worsened, to the hospital. By the time they reach hospital, Yasin is shot dead by the police and the others unite with Sonu.

== Background ==
On 5 March 1964, during the mahurat of this film, Meena Kumari was allegedly hit by Baqar Ali, Kamal Amrohi's assistant for allowing Gulzar to enter her make-up room. When Meena Kumari asked Kamal Amrohi to intervene and come to the studio, he refused and asked her to come back. Enraged, Meena Kumari left Kamal Amrohi's house and never returned.

== Cast ==
- Meena Kumari as Heena Sharma
- Balraj Sahni as Yasin Khan
- Mehmood Ali as Lalu
- Abhi Bhattacharya as Sushobhan "Sonu" Sharma
- Shaukat Azmi
- Persis Khambatta (credited as Ms. Poonam) as Amy
- Keshto Mukherjee
- Asit Sen
- Harindranath Chattopadhyay

== Crew ==
- Director – Salil Chowdhury
- Producer – M. C. Ananthraj
- Story – Salil Chowdhury
- Dialogues – Gulzar
- Screenplay – Salil Chowdhury
- Cinematography – Kamal Bose
- Music – Salil Chowdhury
- Lyrics – Shailendra, Gulzar
- Editing – Hrishikesh Mukherjee
- Art Direction – Sudhendu Roy
- Playback Singers – Manna Dey, Lata Mangeshkar, Asha Bhosle

== Soundtrack ==
The film had five songs in it. The music of the film was composed by Salil Chowdhury. Shailendra and Gulzar wrote the lyrics.

1. "Manzil Teri Khoj Mein" - Lata Mangeshkar. Lyrics by: Shailendra
2. "Aisa Hoga" - Manna Dey, Meena Kumari. Lyrics by: Gulzar
3. "Jhoom Le Jhoom Le" - Asha Bhosle. Lyrics by: Shailendra
4. "Mere Nayan Paakhi Bechare" - Lata Mangeshkar. Lyrics by: Shailendra
5. "Nicha Kaam Uncha Naam" - Manna Dey. Lyrics by: Shailendra

== Bibliography ==
- Mehta, Vinod (2016). Meena Kumari: The Classic Biography. HarperCollins Publishers India. ISBN 978-93-5029-625-7.
