= Bhabhi Ki Chudiyan =

1961 film

- Film poster
- Directed by: Sadashiv J. Row Kavi
- Written by: Srinivas Joshi; Y.G. Joshi
- Story by: Y. G. Joshi
- Produced by: Mahipatray Shah
- Starring: Meena Kumari; Balraj Sahni; Seema Deo; Durga Khote; Sailesh Kumar
- Cinematography: Arvind Laad
- Edited by: Madhu Prabhavalkar
- Music by: Sudhir Phadke (soundtrack); Anthony Gonsalves (background)
- Distributed by: Sadashiv Chitra
- Release date: 1 January 1961
- Country: India
- Language: Hindi

Bhabhi Ki Chudiyan is a 1961 Hindi-language drama film directed by Sadashiv J. Row Kavi, starring Meena Kumari and Balraj Sahni. It is a remake of the 1953 Marathi film Vahininchya Bangdya.

== Plot ==
Geeta (Meena Kumari) is married to Shyam (Balraj Sahni), but is unable to bear children. Orphaned as a youth, Mohan (Sailesh Kumar) is raised by his elder brother Shyam and his wife, Geeta, who offers the boy motherly love and devotion. Mohan marries Prabha (Seema Deo), Prabha is from a wealthy family and her life is ruled over by her dominating mom (Durga Khote). Mohan's youthful bride becomes jealous of his loyalty to his family. Misunderstandings arise to such an extent that Prabha moves out of her home, and back to her mom's. She gives birth to a baby, and not even her husband comes to visit her or to see the baby. But when the infant falls ill, Prabha must set aside her apprehension and learn to trust.

== Cast ==
- Balraj Sahni as Shyam
- Meena Kumari as Geeta
- Shailesh Kumar as Mohan
- Seema Deo as Prabha
- Durga Khote as Prabha's Mother
- Om Prakash as Prabha's Father
- Sulochana
- Ratnamala
- Salvi
- Master Aziz
- Yusuf
- Adhik Shirodkar
- Ghanshyam
- Levy
- Thakur
- Aaron Joseph
- Baby Shaadab

== Music ==
While Sudhir Phadke provided the music direction, the lyrics were penned by Narendra Sharma.

Song	Singer(s)	Raga
"Laaj Rakho Girdhari..."	Lata Mangeshkar	Shivaranjani
"Lau Lagati, Geet Gati..."	Lata Mangeshkar	Yaman Kalyan
"Jyoti Kalash Chhalke..."	Lata Mangeshkar	Bhoopali
"Mera Nanha Kanhaiya..."	Lata Mangeshkar	
"Chand, Tu Yahan Hai..."	Asha Bhosle	
"Ghoda Nachaye Mera Laadla..."	Asha Bhosle	
"Kahan Ud Chale Hai Man Pran Mere..."	Asha Bhosle, Mukesh	
"Tum Se Hi Ghar Ghar Kehlaya..."	Mukesh	Darbari Kanada
