= Pratiggya =

- प्रतिज्ञा
- Directed by: Nandlal Jaswantlal
- Starring: Motilal; Swaran lata; Baby Meena; Bhudo Advani; Veena; Meena Shorey
- Music by: Nano Mujamdar
- Distributed by: Chitra Production
- Release date: 1943
- Country: India
- Language: Hindi

Pratiggya (English: The Vow) is an Indian film. It was released in 1943. The cast includes Baby Meena (Meena Kumari) as a child artist.

== Cast ==
- Motilal
- Swaran lata
- Baby Meena
- Bhudo Advani
- Meena Shorey
- Veena
