= Farishta (1958 film) =

- Directed by: Ravindra Dave
- Written by: Abrar Alvi
- Screenplay by: C. J. Pavri
- Story by: C. J. Pavri
- Starring: Sohrab Modi; Ashok Kumar; Meena Kumari; Anita Guha
- Cinematography: Prakash Malhotra
- Edited by: Pran Mehra
- Music by: O. P. Nayyar
- Production company: Pancholi Pictures
- Release date: 1958
- Country: India
- Language: Hindi

Farishta is a 1958 Indian Hindi-language suspense thriller film directed by Ravindra Dave. It stars Sohrab Modi, Ashok Kumar, Meena Kumari in lead roles.

== Cast ==
- Sohrab Modi as Dayal
- Ashok Kumar as Chandan / Ashok
- Meena Kumari as Shobha
- Anita Guha as Rani
- Mehmood as Sukhiya
- Nana Palsikar as Ramdin
- Mubarak as Leeladhar
- Murad as Bagga

== Soundtrack ==
Song	Singer
"Jo Waqt Pe Kaam Aa Jaye, Aji Wahi Sahara Achha Hai"	Mohammed Rafi, Asha Bhosle
"Balam Bada Jhutha"	Asha Bhosle
"Aaj Maine Jana Mera Dil"	Asha Bhosle
"Karke Ishara Mera Dil Le Gaya"	Asha Bhosle
"Meri Akhiyon Mein Akhiyan"	Asha Bhosle
"Bach Bach Bach"	Geeta Dutt
