= Bachchon Ka Khel =

- Directed by: Raja Nene
- Written by: G. K. Power
- Produced by: Ramnik Productions
- Starring: Meena Kumari; Aga Jan; Nimbalkar; Shanta Patel; Baby Shakuntala
- Music by: C. Ramchandara
- Release date: 2 May 1946
- Country: India
- Language: Hindi

Bachchon Ka Khel (lit. 'Child's Play') is a 1946 Indian film produced by Ramnik Productions and directed by Raja Nene. It was released at Novelty Bombay on 2 May. The film's music is by C. Ramchandara, lyrics by Magan, Pt Sharma and art direction by Shripatrao Mane. The film starred Meena Kumari, Aga Jan, Nimbalkar, Shanta Patel and Baby Shakuntala.

With this film, at the young age of 13, Baby Meena became the heroine Meena Kumari. To quote the film review featured in Filmindia 1946 "The newcomer Meena Kumari is a good addition to the screen. she does well as Anuradha and has a promising future." The film turned out to be an ordinary film, but Meena performed with credit and her talent was noticed at this time by two other important film makers, Kidar Sharma and Homi Wadia. Meena Kumari, after her career as a child artist, started doing adult roles as heroines in mythologicals and fantasy genres before she made it in mainstream cinema with Baiju Bawra (1952).

== Music ==
1. "Tum Kalpana Karo" (Version 2) - Mohammed Rafi
2. "Aaye Aaye Hain Sapne Me Hamare Woh" - Anuradha
3. "Bante Na Banega Kisi Ke Desh Hamara" - Vasanti
4. "Dekhe Na Kahi Duniya" - Vasanti, Vijaya Chitalkar Ramchandra Magan
5. "Jivan Ki Dhara To Jaise Jharne Ka Pani" - N/A
6. "Mujhko Teri Yaad Hansaye" - N/A
7. "Nazre Hamari Mil Gaye" - Shanta
8. "O Bhulne Wale" - N/A
9. "Tum Kalpana Karo" (Version 1) - Vasanti
- Note: During the 1940s, the names of the characters (female) who sung the songs onscreen were shown on the sound records. Thus, the artists namely Anuradha, Vasanti and Shanta are actually the names of characters on whom the song was picturised and not the names of the original singers.
