= Char Dil Char Rahen =

1959 film by Khwaja Ahmad Abbas

- Directed by: Khwaja Ahmad Abbas
- Written by: Khwaja Ahmad Abbas; Inder Raj Anand; V. P. Sathe
- Screenplay by: Khwaja Ahmad Abbas
- Based on: Char Dil Char Rahen
- Produced by: Khwaja Ahmad Abbas
- Starring: Raj Kapoor; Ajit; Shammi Kapoor; Meena Kumari; Nimmi
- Cinematography: S. Ramachandra
- Music by: Anil Biswas; Sahir Ludhianvi
- Production company: Naya Sansar
- Release date: 1959
- Running time: 160 min.
- Country: India
- Language: Hindi
- Box office: est. ₹52.7 million

Char Dil Char Rahen (English title: Four Hearts, Four Roads) is a 1959 Hindi film directed by Khwaja Ahmad Abbas, and starring two big stars of the era, real-life brothers Shammi Kapoor and Raj Kapoor. The movie is based on a novel of the same name.

== Plot ==
Three young men Govinda, Dilwar, and Jhonny waiting at the crossroads for their lovers. Govinda was prevented from marrying Chavi as she is untouchable and driven out of the village. Govinda then waits for her at the crossroads. Dilwar rescues Pyari from Nawab but she refuses to escape without her mother. She then sets up a shop and waits near the crossroad for Dilawar. Jhonny, in love with Stella, is framed by his boss Fereira, and jailed. He later joins the group at the crossroads and starts a garage. Nirmal Kumar the union leader then asks the trio to blast a hill at the crossroad to build a road.

== Cast ==
- Raj Kapoor as Govinda
- Ajit as Dilawar
- Shammi Kapoor as Johny Braganza
- Meena Kumari as Chavli
- Kumkum as Stella D'Souza
- Nimmi as Pyari
- Anwar Hussain as Nawab Saab
- David Abraham as Ferreira
- Nana Palsikar as Pujariji
- Achala Sachdev
- P. Jairaj as Nirmal Kumar
- Rashid Khan
- Kumari Naaz (as Baby Naaz)

== Soundtrack ==
Music in the film was given by Anil Biswas, with lyrics by Sahir Ludhianvi. The songs featured in the film include "Kachhi Hai Umariya" performed by Meena Kapoor, "Nahi Kiya To Karke Dekh" by Mukesh, "Kadam Kadam Se Dil Se Dil" by Mukesh, Mahendra Kapoor and Meena Kapoor, "Intezar Aur Abhi Aur Abhi" by Lata Mangeshkar, "Koi Maane Na Maane" by Lata Mangeshkar, and "Koi Dil Koi Chahat Se" also by Lata Mangeshkar.

== Box office ==
It was released simultaneously with other big films, Devendra Goel's Chirag Kahan Roshni Kahan and V Shantaram's Navrang, while Navrang was a hit, Chirag Kahan Roshni Kahan broke even and Char Dil Char Rahen failed at the Indian box office in 1959.

However, it later went on to become an overseas blockbuster at the Soviet box office, where it drew 39.8 million viewers in 1962. In the Soviet Union, the film grossed 9.95 million Rbls (Note: 39.8 million tickets sold, average ticket price of 25 kopecks)) (US$11.06 million, (Note: 0.9 roubles per US dollar from 1961 to 1971) ₹5.27 crore), (Note: 4.7619 Indian rupees per US dollar from 1950 to 1965) equivalent to US$118 million (₹591 crore) in 2016. Its overseas Soviet gross exceeded the domestic Indian gross of all films released in 1959.

== Controversy ==
Shammi Kapoor received a legal notice from director Abbas when he refused to act for one of the songs in the film, and many other controversies with the stars of that era caused director Abbas to vow to stop making movies with mainstream movie stars.
