= Vijay (1942 film) =

1942 film

- Release date: 1942
- Country: India
- Language: Hindi

Vijay is an Indian film. It was released in 1942. The film also had Baby Meena (Meena Kumari, as a child artist).
