= Main Chup Rahungi =

- Poster
- Directed by: A. Bhimsingh
- Written by: Jawar N. Sitaraman; Rajendra Krishan
- Based on: Kalathur Kannamma by Jawar N. Sitaraman
- Produced by: A.V. Meiyappan
- Starring: Meena Kumari; Sunil Dutt
- Music by: Chitragupta
- Distributed by: AVM Productions
- Release date: 2 November 1962
- Country: India
- Language: Hindi

Main Chup Rahungi (English: I Shall Remain Silent) is a 1962 Indian Hindi-language film directed by A. Bhimsingh and produced by A.V. Meiyappan. The film stars Meena Kumari and Sunil Dutt in lead roles. The film was a remake of 1960 Tamil film Kalathur Kannamma.

== Plot ==
Narayan works as a laborer on a farmland owned by businessman Ratan Kumar, in Ramnagar. Although Narayan was an ex-convict, Ratan had assisted him getting a job, some land, and a small house where he now lives with his grown daughter, Gayatri, who is training to be a teacher. To his complete shock, Narayan finds out that Gayatri is pregnant. Ratan asks Narayan to take some money and relocate, which Narayan gratefully does. Gayatri gives birth to a baby boy, and Narayan takes him to an orphanage donated by Ratan himself, and informs Gayatri that her child was still-born. Gayatri and Narayan eventually return to Ramnagar, and as luck would have it, Gayatri finds a job as a teacher in the orphanage that her son (now named Shyam) lives in. When Ratan's son, Kamal, returns from Singapore, he meets Shyam and likes him, but when he finds out that his school-teacher is Gayatri, he demands that Gayatri be fired as she is not of good character. Who is Shyam's father, why Gayatri remains silent about her child's identity, and what Kamal knows about Gayatri's background are the questions to be discovered later in the film.

== Cast ==
- Meena Kumari as Gayatri
- Sunil Dutt as Kamal Kumar
- Nana Palsikar as Narayan
- Babloo as Shyam
- Jagirdar as Ratan Kumar
- Mohan Choti as Madhav
- Helen as Menka
- Raj Mehra as Thekedaar

== Awards ==
10th Filmfare Awards:

Nominated

- Best Actress – Meena Kumari
- Best Story – Jawar N. Sitaraman

== Music ==
Main Chup Rahungi

Studio album by Chitragupta
- Released: 1962 (India)
- Genre: Feature film soundtrack
- Label: Saregama
- Producer: Chitragupta

Chitragupta chronology
Hum Matawle Naujawan (1962)	Main Chup Rahungi (1962)	Burmah Road (1962)

The soundtrack of the film contains 7 songs. The music is composed by Chitragupta, with lyrics authored by Rajendra Krishan.

The melody of the song 'Koi Batade Dil Hai Kahan' was adapted from 'Sirithu Sirithu Ennai', a song composed by K. V. Mahadevan for the 1961 Tamil film Thai Sollai Thattathe.

Song	Singer
"Tumhi Ho Mata, Pita Tumhi Ho"	Lata Mangeshkar
"Mere Dil Kabhi To Aayega"	Lata Mangeshkar
"Aaye Na Balam, Ka Karoon Sajni" (Parody Song)	Lata Mangeshkar, Mohammed Rafi
"Chand Jane Kahan Kho Gaya, Tumko Chehre Se Parda Hatana"	Lata Mangeshkar, Mohammed Rafi
"Koi Bata De Dil Hai Jahan, Kyun Hota Hai Dard Wahan"	Lata Mangeshkar, Mohammed Rafi
"Khush Raho Ahl-E-Chaman"	Mohammed Rafi
"Main Kaun Hoon"	Mohammed Rafi
