= Akeli Mat Jaiyo =

- Directed by: Nandlal Jaswantlal
- Written by: Chandulal Shah (story and screenplay), Akhtar-Ul-Iman (dialogue)
- Produced by: Gohar K. Mamajiwala, Chandulal Shah, Navinchandra C. Shah
- Starring: Rajendra Kumar; Meena Kumari; Agha; Minoo Mumtaz; Ruby Myers; Leela Mishra
- Cinematography: Vasant Nagesh Buva
- Edited by: Shankarlal Nayak
- Music by: Madan Mohan
- Release date: 12 April 1963
- Running time: 145 minutes
- Country: India
- Language: Hindi

Akeli Mat Jaiyo (English: Don't go alone) is a 1963 Bollywood film starring Rajendra Kumar and Meena Kumari.

== Cast ==
- Rajendra Kumar as Prince Amardeep/Rajendrakumar
- Meena Kumari as Seema
- Agha as Ram Singh
- Ruby Mayer as Queen
- Leela Mishra as Rajendra's mother
- Minoo Mumtaz as Shobha
- Noor Mohammed Charlie
- Sulochana Latkar
- Leela Mishra
- Uma Khosla as Seema Friend
- Manju
- Binki
- Monica
- Prem Kumar
- Nandina

== Soundtrack ==
All songs were composed by Madan Mohan and written by Majrooh Sultanpuri.

| Song | Singer |
|---|---|
| "Akeli Mat Jaiyo" | Lata Mangeshkar |
| "Woh Jo Milte The Kabhi" | Lata Mangeshkar |
| "Yeh To Kaho Kaun Ho Tum, Meri Bahar Tum Hi" | Lata Mangeshkar, Mohammed Rafi |
| "Yeh Hawa Yeh Mastana Mausam, Dil Ko Phir" | Lata Mangeshkar, Mohammed Rafi |
| "Raste Me Do Anjane Aise Mile Deewane" | Mohammed Rafi, Asha Bhosle |
| "Yeh Cycle Ka Chakkar Kabhi Aage Kabhi Peeche" | Mohammed Rafi, Asha Bhosle |
| "Thodi Der Ke Liye Mere" | Asha Bhosle |
| "Chal Chal Chal Mere Dil" | Mukesh |
