= Zindagi Aur Khwab =

1961 film by S. Banerji

- Poster
- Directed by: Shanu Banerjee
- Written by: Kamal Amrohi
- Produced by: Dinu M. Desai
- Starring: Rajendra Kumar; Meena Kumari
- Cinematography: Dinu M. Desai
- Edited by: Krishnarao Ambavane; Ram Khade
- Music by: Dattaram Wadkar
- Release date: 20 January 1961
- Running time: 145 mins
- Country: India
- Language: Hindi
- Box office: ₹60 lakh (equivalent to ₹53 crore or US$5.5 million in 2023)

Zindagi Aur Khwab (transl. Life and dreams) is a 1961 Bollywood drama film produced by Dinu M. Desai and directed by Shanu Banerjee (S. Banerjee). The film was declared above average at the box office.

Dattaram Wadkar was the music director. Hit songs from the movie include 'Kehti Hai Jhuki Nazar' sung by Suman Kalyanpur.

== Plot ==
The story is about Shanti (Meena Kumari), an orphan, whose stepmother tortured her. Finally, she was married off to Shankar (Jayant), who was criminal and much older than her. Shankar Murders Chandabai a Mujrawali and Escapes. Police Chase his Truck, which falls in river and he is presumed dead. Inspector Manoj (Rajendra Kumar) keeps visiting Shanti for investigation and they both fall in love with each other. Shanti is hoping for a better life, but Shankar appears live and her hopes are dashed.

== Cast ==
- Rajendra Kumar as Inspector Manoj
- Meena Kumari as Shanti
- Jayant as Shankar Lal
- Agha as Rasiya
- Ajit as Kailash
- Mumtaz Begum as Gajrabai
- Naazi as Rasili

== Crew ==
- Director – S. Banerji
- Producer – Dinu M. Desai
- Story – Kamal Amrohi
- Dialogues – Anand Dutta
- Screenplay – Madhusudan Kelkar
- Cinematography – Dinu M. Desai
- Music – Dattaram
- Lyrics – Kavi Pradeep
- Editing – Ram Khade, Krishnarao Ambhavane
- Art Direction – D. S. Malavankar
- Playback Singers –Mukesh, Mohammed Rafi, Manna Dey, Suman Kalyanpur, Mubarak Begum, Kamal Barot

== Soundtrack ==
Zindagi Aur Khwab

Soundtrack album by Dattaram Wadkar
- Recorded: Unknown
- Genre: Film soundtrack
- Producer: Dinu M. Desai

All lyrics are written by Kavi Pradeep; all music is composed by Dattaram Wadkar.

No.	Title	Singer(s)	Length
1.	"Kabhi Kisi Ki Khushian Koi Loote Na"	Mukesh	3:04
2.	"Kateli Kateli Nasheli Nasheli"	Suman Kalyanpur	3:30
3.	"Kehti Hai Jhuki Jhuki Nazar"	Suman Kalyanpur	3:29
4.	"Mera Bandar Chala Sasural"	Mohammed Rafi, Kamal Barot	3:19
5.	"Phool Bagiya Men Bhanware Aaye"	Mubarak Begum	3:33
6.	"Na Jaane Tum Kahan Thay"	Manna Dey, Suman Kalyanpur	3:40
Total length:			20:35
