= Garib (film) =

- Directed by: Ramchandra Thakur
- Starring: Nisar Ahmad Ansari; Meena Kumari; Surendra Nath
- Release date: 1942
- Country: India
- Language: Hindi

Garib is an Indian film. It was released in 1942.

The film also had Baby Meena (Meena Kumari) as a child artist.
