= Nai Roshni (1941 film) =

- Directed by: L. Mehta, Chimankant Gandhi
- Produced by: National Studios
- Starring: Sardar Akhtar; Meena Shorey; Meena Kumari
- Music by: Anil Biswas
- Release date: 1941
- Country: India
- Language: Hindi

Nai Roshni is an Indian drama film directed by L. Mehta and Chimankant Gandhi. It was released in 1941 under the banner of National Studios. The film also had Baby Meena (Meena Kumari) as a child artist.

== Cast ==
- Sardar Akhtar
- Meena Shorey
- Harish
- Meena Kumari
- Husn Bano
- Amar
- Kanhaiyalal

== Release ==
A silent film with the same name was released in 1930.

== Remake ==
Another film with this name was released in 1967. It starrs Mala Sinha, Ashok Kumar and Biswajeet.
