= Bahana (1960 film) =

1960 film

- Poster
- Directed by: M. Kumar
- Produced by: Pramila
- Starring: Meena Kumari; Sajjan; Mehmood
- Music by: Madan Mohan
- Production company: Silver Films
- Release date: 1960
- Language: Hindi

Bahana (transl. Excuse) is a 1960 Indian Hindi-language film starring Meena Kumari, Mehmood and Sajjan in lead roles. The film was directed by actor-director M. Kumar and was produced by Pramila under the banner of Silver Films.

== Cast ==
- Meena Kumari
- Sajjan
- Mehmood Ali
- Sulochana Latkar
- Krishna Kumari
- Helen

== Crew ==
- Director – M. Kumar
- Producer – Pramila, Ram Kumar
- Music – Madan Mohan
- Lyrics – Rajendra Krishan
- Playback Singers – Shamshad Begum, Lata Mangeshkar, Asha Bhosle, Talat Mahmood

== Soundtrack ==
The film had eight songs in it. The music of the film was composed by Madan Mohan. Rajendra Krishan penned down the lyrics.

Song	Singer	Raga
"Adosan Padosan Kahe"	Shamshad Begum	
"Bol Mere Nandlala"	Lata Mangeshkar	
"Ja Re, Badra Bairi Ja"	Lata Mangeshkar	Kalyan
"Guzre Hai Is Tarah Se"	Lata Mangeshkar	
"Be-Reham Aasman"	Talat Mahmood	
"Teri Nigahon Mein, Teri Hi Bahon Mein Rehne Ko"	Talat Mahmood, Asha Bhosle	
"Mohabbat Kya Hai"	Asha Bhosle	
