= Naya Andaz =

- Poster
- Directed by: K. Amarnath
- Produced by: K. Amarnath
- Starring: Kishore Kumar; Meena Kumari
- Music by: O. P. Nayyar
- Release date: 1956
- Country: India
- Language: Hindi

Naya Andaz (transl. The new style) is a 1956 Indian Hindi-language film starring Kishore Kumar and Meena Kumari in lead roles. The music was composed by O. P. Nayyar.

== Plot ==
Sukhan and Chand (Kishore Kumar) are the father and son, who hold diametrically opposite views on the subject of their poems. The conflict in opinion compels Chand to leave his father's abode to prove that his poetry is more soul-appealing. He and his bosom friend Karim (Johnny Walker (actor)) grid up loins to face the blows and buffets of the world together. They come in contact with various types of persons on their journey. Some put them in a jam while others extend a generous helping hand. They see mankind great in kindness and terrible in evil. Karim comes in contact with gypsy girl named Lali (Kumkum (actress)) and he is nuts about her. Lali leaves her caravan and joins Chand and Karim and the glorious trio sets out for Bombay in quest of name and fame. In Bombay they find an affectionate home in Gulshan Singh's garage. From this humble abode Chand rises to dizzy heights of success. During his theatrical career Chand falls in love with Mala (Meena Kumari) who not only is a first class artist but a paragon of virtue and a model of modesty as well. Mala responds to the impulsive overtures of Chand with great enthusiasm. The theater owner Ashok Babu (Pran (actor)) who becomes a victim to the green-eyed monster can a plot to part them. The unprincipled Ashok Babu conspires with Mala's brother Brij (Jayant (actor)) who is a devotee to a different place away from Chand. Ashok Babu then dismisses Chand from his theater and gets the press to publish all sorts of defamatory and damaging articles about Chand. Chand once again finds himself thrown over the world but does not lose his heart. Even his mother's tears can not persuade Chand to change the course of action. He once again makes an all try out to regain what he had lost. Mala makes frantic efforts to extricate herself from the vicious well knit net of treachery of Ashok Babu. How Chand comes out flying with colours? What lies in store for Mala? – you can see for yourself on the screen.

== Cast ==
- Kishore Kumar as Chand
- Meena Kumari as Mala
- Johnny Walker as Karim
- Kumkum as Raina
- Pran as Ashok
- Gope
- Murad as Sukhan
- Jayant as Brij

== Music ==
All songs composed by O. P. Nayyar and lyrics by Jan Nisar Akhtar.

Song	Singer
"Apna To Zamane Mein"	Kishore Kumar
"Hawa Pichhle Pahar"	Kishore Kumar
"Mehfil Mein Aaj Teri"	Kishore Kumar
"Meri Neendon Mein Tum, Meri Khwabon Mein Tum"	Kishore Kumar, Shamshad Begum
"Tumhi Se Pyar, Tumhi Se Karaar Milta Hai"	Kishore Kumar, Shamshad Begum
"Chana Zor Garam Babu, Main Laya Mazedar"	Kishore Kumar, Shamshad Begum
"Bachke Balam Kahan"	Shamshad Begum
"Raat Rangeeli Gaaye Re"	Shamshad Begum
"Duniya Ke Bazar Mein Bhaiya Milta Khota Maal"	Kishore Kumar, Mohammed Rafi
"Aaj Suhani Raat Re, Aaha Aaha, Hogi Sajan Se Baat Re, Aaha Aaha"	Kishore Kumar, Mohammed Rafi, Shamshad Begum
"Ye Raat Aashiqana, Chhaya Sama Suhana"	Mohammed Rafi, Asha Bhosle
