= Madhu (1959 film) =

1959 film by Gyan Mukherjee

- Directed by: Gyan Mukherjee & Shanu Banerjee
- Written by: Gyan Mukherjee
- Produced by: Ghanshyam Das; Maya Art Pictures
- Starring: Meena Kumari; Karan Dewan
- Music by: Roshan
- Release date: 1959
- Language: Hindi

Madhu is a 1959 Indian Hindi-language film starring Meena Kumari and Karan Dewan in lead roles. The film is directed by Gyan Mukherjee and Shanu Banerjee. Shanu Banerjee, having been his assistant previously completed the film after Gyan Mukherjee died in 1956. Its music is composed by Roshan.

== Plot ==
Madhu a daughter of a village Purohit and Vijay son of the Zamindar are in deep love. When Zamindar learns about this, he orders Vijay to go to Lucknow and tells the purohit to take some money and marry Madhu off to someone else immediately. Vijay escapes from the train, returns to Madhu's house and convinces purohit to marry him to Madhu immediately, promising to change Zamindar's mind. They get married and celebrate 'Suhag Raat', too. Then Vijay returns to Lucknow. The wicked Munim who had accompanied him to Lucknow, informs Zamindar, who rushes to Lucknow. He intercepts the letters of the newlyweds. Thus Madhu is stranded, without any news from Vijay and Vijay does not know that she is carrying his child. Zamindar fixes Vijay's marriage to another girl. Vijay rushes to his village only to find that due to social stigma of unwed motherhood, Madhu has left the town in his search. Also his friend Shambhu is in Lucknow to find him. The rest of the story takes the beaten track of a married couple missing each other, the father falling sick, Madhu nursing him to recovery, change of heart by the father and reunion of the husband and wife with a child as a bonus.

== Cast ==
- Meena Kumari as Madhu
- Karan Dewan as Vijay
- Kumkum
- Tun Tun
- Krishnakant as Shambhu
- Pratima Devi
- Sheela Vaz
- Jagdish Sethi

== Crew ==
- Director – Gyan Mukherjee & Shanu Banerjee
- Producer – Ghanshyam Das
- Story – Gyan Mukherjee
- Screenplay – Gyan Mukherjee
- Dialogues – Gyan Mukherjee
- Music – Roshan
- Lyrics – Shailendra, Prem Dhawan, Naqsh Lyallpuri
- Playback singers – Lata Mangeshkar, Mohammed Rafi, Manna Dey, Asha Bhosle

== Soundtrack ==
The film had seven songs in it. The music of the film was composed by Roshan. Shailendra, Prem Dhawan and Naqsh Lyallpuri wrote the lyrics.

1. "Kisi Ko Na Bataoongi" – Lata Mangeshkar. Lyrics by: Shailendra
2. "Bata Do Koi Kaun Gali Gaye Shyam" (Male) – Manna Dey. Lyrics by: Shailendra
3. "Bata Do Koi Kaun Gali Gaye Shyam" (Female) – Lata Mangeshkar. Lyrics by: Shailendra
4. "Kaahe Bano Ji Anjaan " – Lata Mangeshkar. Lyrics by: Shailendra
5. "Dhaani Chunar Mori Hai" – Lata Mangeshkar. Lyrics by: Naqsh Lyallpuri
6. "Tumse Lagan Laagi" – Mohammad Rafi, Lata Mangeshkar. Lyrics by: Naqsh Lyallpuri
7. "O Deke Badnaami Zamane Bhar Ki" – Asha Bhosle, Mohammad Rafi. Lyrics by: Prem Dhawan
