= Meena Kumari =

Indian actress and poet (1933–1972)

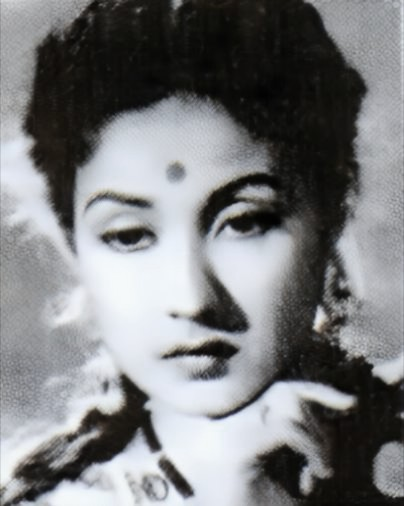
- Meena Kumari in Baiju Bawra
- Born: Mahjabeen Bano; 1 August 1933; Bombay, Bombay Presidency, British India (present-day Mumbai, Maharashtra, India)
- Died: 31 March 1972 (aged 38); Bombay, Maharashtra, India.
- Burial place: Rahmatabad cemetery, Mumbai
- Other name: Tragedy Queen
- Occupations: Actress; poet; singer; costume designer
- Years active: 1939–1972
- Works: See list
- Spouse: Kamal Amrohi (m. 1952; sep. 1964)
- Relatives: Khurshid Jr. (sister); Baby Madhuri (sister); Ali-Amrohi family (by marriage)
- Awards: See list
- Musical career
- Genre: Filmi, Ghazals
- Writing career
- Pen name: Naaz
- Meena Kumari's voice A 30-second sample of "Tanha Chand", from I Write, I Recite, 1971.

Meena Kumari (born Mahjabeen Bano; 1 August 1933 – 31 March 1972) was an Indian actress and poet, who worked in Hindi films. Widely regarded as the "Tragedy Queen of Bollywood", she is considered one of the greatest actresses in the history of Indian cinema. In a career spanning 33 years, from child actress to adult, Kumari is a recipient of several accolades, including four Filmfare awards and has starred in over 90 films.

Kumari won four Filmfare Awards in the Best Actress category. She was the recipient of the inaugural Filmfare Best Actress Award for Baiju Bawra in 1954 and had a consecutive win in the second Filmfare Awards (1955) for Parineeta. Kumari made history at the 10th Filmfare Awards (1963) by receiving all three of the Best Actress nominations, and won for her performance in Sahib Bibi Aur Ghulam. In the 13th Filmfare Awards (1966), she won her last Best Actress award for Kaajal. Critics have noted that her character in Sahib Bibi Aur Ghulam is similar to her life. She also went onto appear in other successful films such as - Do Bigha Zamin (1953), Dil Apna Aur Preet Parai (1960), Aarti (1962), Main Chup Rahungi (1962), Dil Ek Mandir (1963), Phool Aur Patthar (1966) and Mere Apne (1971).

By late 1960s, Kumari became addicted to alcohol, the effect of which was visible in her subsequent films. Kumari was also a poet and a playback singer. She sang in some of her early films as a child artist and to her poems which came out in an album, I Write, I Recite (1971). She also designed the costumes in Pakeezah. On 31 March 1972, Kumari died at the age of 38, from cirrhosis of the liver, which has been associated with her alcoholism.

== Early life and family ==
=== Background and parents ===
Kumari's grandmother, Hem Sundari Tagore, was either the daughter or a widow of Rabindranath Tagore's distant cousin. After the death of her husband, she was forced by his family to leave for Meerut, where she became a nurse, married a Christian named Pyare Lal Shakir Meeruti (1880–1956) who was an Urdu journalist and embraced Christianity. She had two daughters; one of whom was Prabhavati, Kumari's mother.

Prabhavati was a Christian who converted to Islam and adopted the name Iqbal Begum after her marriage to Ali Bux. Begum was born to a father from Meerut, Uttar Pradesh and a Bengali mother. She was the second wife of Ali Bux. Before meeting and marrying Ali Bux, she was a stage actress and was said to be related to the Tagore family of Bengal. Kumari's father was a Sunni Muslim named Master Ali Bux (b. 1899) who had migrated from Bhera (now in West Punjab, Pakistan). He was a veteran of Parsi theater, played harmonium, wrote Urdu poetry, composed music and also played small roles in a few films.

=== Birth and childhood ===
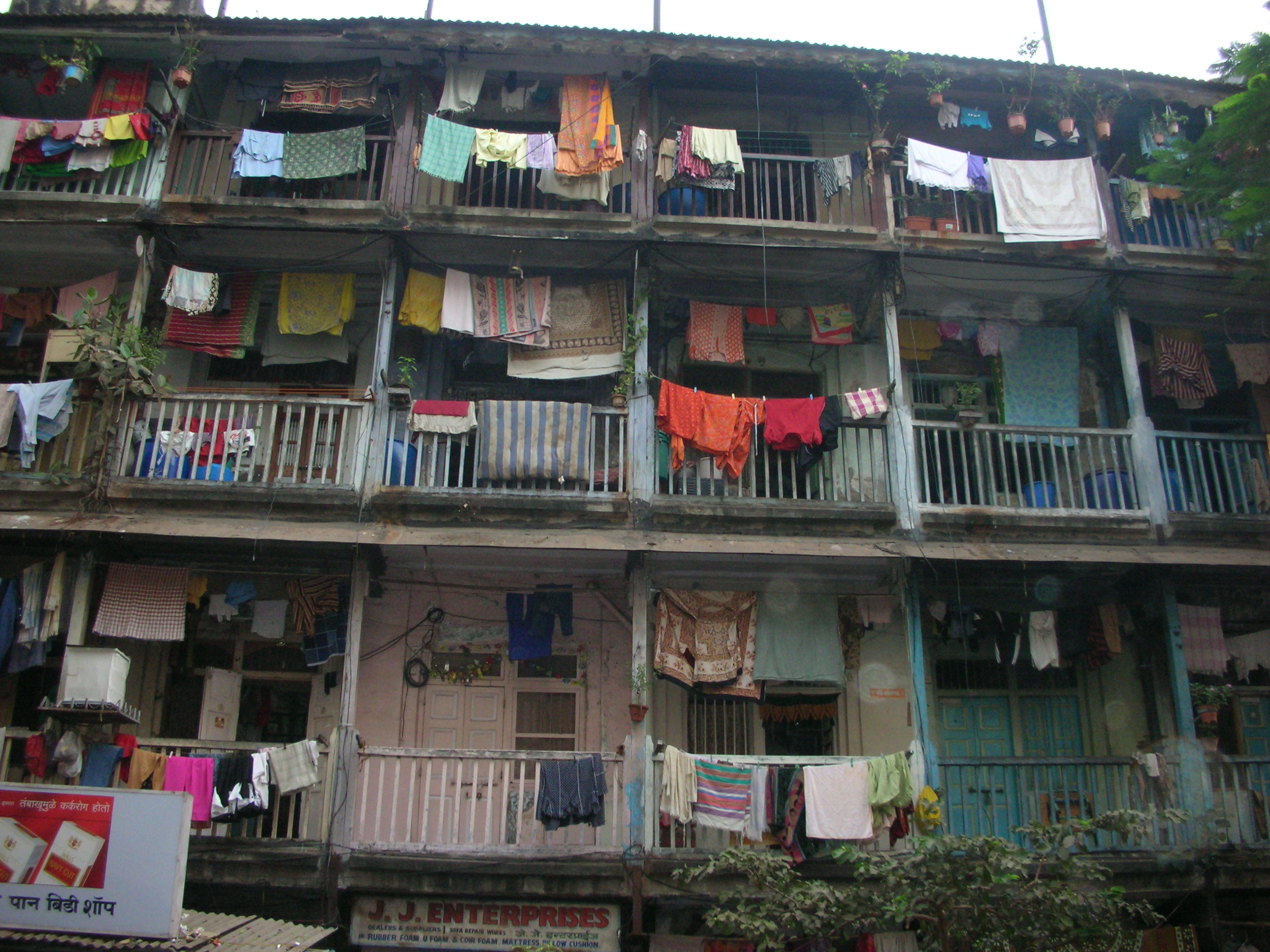
Kumari was born in one such chawl, namely Mithawala Chawl in 1933.

Meena Kumari was born with the name Mahjabeen to Ali Bux (b. 1899) and Iqbal Begum on 1 August 1933. This was a great disappointment to Ali Bux as he wanted a son. She was the second daughter and had two sisters; the elder named Khurshid Jr. and the younger named Mah Laqa (also known as Madhu / Baby Madhuri, a former child artist married to actor Mehmood). Her father could not afford to pay the doctor for her delivery, so he left her at an orphanage, but he changed his mind a few hours later and took her back home.

As a child, Kumari was not keen on having a film career, and would rather attend school. As per the contemporary records available, Kumari passed her sixth grade from Municipal School, Dadar and was thereafter homeschooled. Despite this, her parents started taking her to film studios for work opportunities. She was admitted into a regular school, but the demands of work frequently interrupted her curriculum. She did not attend school in any meaningful sense, therefore her education was the result of private tuition and self-education.

== Career ==
=== Early work as Baby Meena (1939–45) ===
Director Vijay Bhatt cast Mahjabeen in the film Leatherface and on her first day of work, she was paid Rs. 25. Leatherface was released in 1939. She became the breadwinner in the Bux family at a very young age. In an interview given in 1962, Kumari explained that the fact that she had supported her parents from the age of four gave her immense satisfaction.

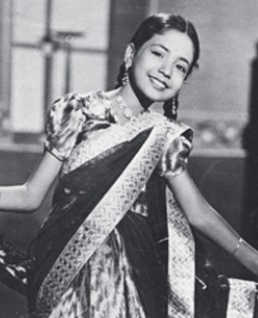
Meena Kumari, aged eight

Kumari began acting when she was four. She initially worked mostly in Vijay Bhatt productions; Leather Face (1939), Adhuri Kahani (1939), Pooja (1940) and Ek Hi Bhool (1940). Bhatt rechristened Mahjabeen as "Baby Meena" during the filming of Ek Hi Bhool (1940).

More films followed, namely Nai Roshni (1941), Bahen (1941), Kasauti (1941), Vijay (1942), Garib (1942), Pratiggya (1943) and Lal Haveli (1944).

=== Early career (1946–52) ===
She was cast under the name Meena Kumari in Ramnik Production's Bachchon Ka Khel (1946), playing the role of Agha's love interest named Anuradha. Although Bachchon Ka Khel was scathingly reviewed by then-leading critic Baburao Patel, Kumari's performance was praised nevertheless: Patel described her as "a good addition to the screen" and predicted that she has a "promising future".

=== Rising star (1952–56) ===
- 1952: Baiju Bawra – Kumari played the female lead in the film. Following its success, she featured as a model for Hindustan Lever products and on the calendar of a popular beauty soap.
- 1953: Parineeta – Directed by Bimal Roy, (featuring Ashok Kumar and Kumari in lead) won Kumari her second Filmfare Best Actress Award. It was based on the 1914 Bengali novel by Sharat Chandra Chattopadhyay. Do Bigha Zamin, another Bimal Roy directorial, won the International Prize at Cannes in 1954, the first Indian film to do so. This film also marks the only guest appearance of Kumari. Foot Path – directed by Zia Sarhadi, was Kumari's first film with Dilip Kumar. This movie was featured in Avijit Ghosh's book, 40 Retakes: Bollywood Classics You May Have Missed. Daaera – was written and directed by Kamal Amrohi, starring Kumari, Nasir Khan and Nana Palsikar in lead roles. Other films included Naulakha Haar and Daana Paani.
- 1954: Chandni Chowk – directed by B. R. Chopra in 1954, a classic Muslim social drama film, was a success at the box office. Baadbaan - directed by Phani Majumdar, included a star cast of Kumari, Dev Anand, Ashok Kumar and Usha Kiran. Ilzaam – directed by R. C. Talwar, starring Kumari and Kishore Kumar, also premiered.
- 1955: In Azaad, directed by Sriramulu Naidu S.M., Kumari performed with Dilip Kumar in this comedy. It was the second highest-grossing Hindi film of that year. Adl-e-Jehangir – was a Hindi language historical drama film directed by G.P. Sippy. It became a commercial success at the box office. Bandish - directed by Satyen Bose starring Kumari, Ashok Kumar, and Daisy Irani was a box office hit. Rukhsana - was directed by Talwar and starred Kumari and Kishore Kumar.
- 1956: Mem Sahib – directed by Talwar, featured Kumari for the first time with Shammi Kapoor. The modern avatar of Kumari was well received by audiences and the film became a box office hit. Ek Hi Raasta – was a film based on the issue of widow remarriage, directed and produced by B. R. Chopra. It starred Kumari with newcomer Sunil Dutt, Ashok Kumar and Daisy Irani. The film proved to be successful at the box office and was screened for more than 25 weeks, which was a "Jubilee Hit". Bandhan - directed by Hemchandra Chunder, based on the popular Bengali novel Mantra Shakti, starred Kumari and Pradeep Kumar as leads. It was awarded with a Certificate of Merit in the National Film Awards. Naya Andaz – directed by K. Amarnath, starring Kumari and Kishore Kumar in lead roles, was a musical hit. Halaku – a historical, was directed by D.D. Kashyap which included Kumari, Pran, Minoo Mumtaz, Raj Mehra and Helen. It was a box office hit and celebrated a silver jubilee. Kumari's other 1956 release was Gyan Mukherjee's Shatranj, opposite Ashok Kumar.

=== Tragedy queen of Indian cinema (1957) ===
- 1957: Sharada – directed by L.V. Prasad, was Kumari's first venture with Raj Kapoor. She won best actress at Bengal Film Journalists' Association Award for her work. The film gained great critical success and was the ninth highest grossing film at the Indian box office in 1957. Miss Mary – a comedy film directed by L.V. Prasad, starred Kumari and Gemini Ganesan. The film was one of the biggest hits of that year.
- 1958: For Sahara – directed by Lekhraj Bhakri, Kumari received a Filmfare nomination. Yahudi, directed by Bimal Roy starred Kumari, Dilip Kumar, Sohrab Modi, Nazir Hussain and Nigar Sultana. It was based on the play Yahudi Ki Ladki by Agha Hashar Kashmiri, a classic in Parsi – Urdu theatre, about the persecution of Jews in the Roman Empire. The film was a box office hit. Farishta and Savera (directed by Satyen Bose) had Ashok Kumar and Kumari as protagonists. The films were rated as above average.
- 1959: Chirag Kahan Roshni Kahan, directed and produced by Devendra Goel, stars Kumari with Rajendra Kumar and Honey Irani. The film was a huge hit at the box office and Kumari received a Filmfare nomination for her performance in the Best Actress category. Char Dil Char Rahen – was directed by Khwaja Ahmad Abbas, with a star cast including Kumari, Raj Kapoor, Shammi Kapoor, Kumkum and Nimmi. The film received warm reviews from critics. Shararat – was a 1959 romantic drama film written and directed by Harnam Singh Rawail, starring Kumari, Kishore Kumar, Raaj Kumar and Kumkum in lead roles. Film Chand directed by Lekhraj Bhakri focused on the effects of polygamy prior to The Hindu Marriage Act, 1955. The film stars Kumari with Balraj Sahni, Pandari Bai and newcomer Manoj Kumar in lead roles. Her other films released in 1959 were Ardhangini, Satta Bazaar, Madhu and Jagir.
- 1960: Dil Apna Aur Preet Parai was a Hindi romantic drama written and directed by Kishore Sahu. The film starred Kumari, Raaj Kumar and Nadira as leads. The film narrates the story of a surgeon who is obligated to marry the daughter of a family friend, while he is in love with a colleague nurse, played by Kumari. It is one of her noted acting performances. The film's music is by Shankar Jaikishan, and features the Hawaiian-themed "Ajeeb Dastan Hai Yeh" sung by Lata Mangeshkar. Bahana – directed by Kumar, had a star cast including Kumari, Sajjan, Mehmood, Helen, Pramila, Sulochana Latkar and Sheela Vaz. Kohinoor – directed by S. U. Sunny featured Kumari, Dilip Kumar, Leela Chitnis and Kumkum. A film of lighter tone like Azaad, it lacked the intense characterisations of earlier films of both Dilip Kumar and Kumari.
- 1961: Bhabhi Ki Chudiyan was a family drama directed by Sadashiv J. Row Kavi with Kumari and Balraj Sahni in the lead roles. The film was one of the highest-grossing films of the year. Zindagi aur Khwab – directed S. Bannerjee, starring Kumari and Rajendra Kumar, was a hit at the Indian box office. Pyaar Ka Saagar – was directed by Devendra Goel with Kumari and Rajendra Kumar.

=== Critical acclaim (1962) ===
Sahib Bibi Aur Ghulam

Sahib Bibi Aur Ghulam, a film produced by Guru Dutt and directed by Abrar Alvi featured Kumari in the role of Chhoti Bahu. It is based on the Bengali novel Saheb Bibi Golam by Bimal Mitra. The film stars Kumari, Guru Dutt, Rehman and Waheeda Rehman.

For Sahib Bibi Aur Ghulam, to give the heavy appearance associated with excessive consumption of alcohol, she applied concentrated Eau de Cologne under her nose. The irritation helped her to achieve the visual appearance of an alcoholic.

The film won four Filmfare Awards, including the Best Actress award and was nominated for the Golden Bear at the 13th Berlin International Film Festival, where Kumari was selected as a delegate. It was chosen as India's official entry to the Oscars.

- 1962: Aarti, directed by Phani Majumdar, stars Kumari in the title role of Aarti, with Ashok Kumar, Pradeep Kumar and Shashikala appearing in pivotal roles. Kumari won a Best Actress award for this film from the Bengal Film Journalists' Association. Main Chup Rahungi – directed by A. Bhimsingh with Kumari and Sunil Dutt in lead roles was one of the biggest hits of the year and Kumari received a Filmfare nomination for Best Actress for her performance.
- 1963: Dil Ek Mandir, directed by C. V. Sridhar, starring Kumari, Rajendra Kumar, Raaj Kumar and Mehmood, was a commercial success. Akeli Mat Jaiyo – directed by Nandlal Jaswantlal, is a romantic comedy with Kumari and Rajendra Kumar. Kinare Kinare was directed by Chetan Anand with Kumari, Dev Anand and Chetan Anand in lead roles.
- 1964: Sanjh Aur Savera – is a romantic drama film directed by Hrishikesh Mukherjee, starring Kumari, Guru Dutt and Mehmood. Benazir – is a Muslim social film directed by S. Khalil, starring Kumari, Ashok Kumar, Shashi Kapoor and Tanuja. Chitralekha directed by Kidar Sharma, starring Kumari, Ashok Kumar and Pradeep Kumar, is based on the 1934 Hindi novel by the same name by Bhagwati Charan Verma. Gazal featuring Kumari and Sunil Dutt, is a Muslim social film about the right of young generation to the marriage of their choice. Main Bhi Ladki Hoon was directed by A. C. Tirulokchandar. The film stars Kumari with newcomer Dharmendra.
- 1965: Kaajal directed by Ram Maheshwari, stars Kumari, Dharmendra, Raaj Kumar, Padmini, Helen, Mehmood and Mumtaz. The film was listed by Box Office India in the Top 20 films of 1965. Kumari won her fourth Filmfare award for Kaajal. The film was originally based on the novel Maadhavi by Gulshan Nanda. Bheegi Raat, directed by Kalidas, with Kumari, Ashok Kumar and Pradeep Kumar in lead roles, was one of the biggest hits of the year. The film Purnima, directed by Narendra Suri, features Kumari and Dharmendra in lead roles.
- 1966: Phool Aur Patthar, directed by O. P. Ralhan, stars Kumari and Dharmendra in lead roles. This film became a golden jubilee hit and was the highest-grossing movie of the year. Kumari's performance in the film earned her a nomination in the Best Actress category in the Filmfare awards for that year. The film Pinjre Ke Panchhi was directed by Salil Choudhury, with Kumari, Balraj Sahni and Mehmood in main roles.
- 1967: Majhli Didi was directed by Hrishikesh Mukherjee and stars Kumari along with Dharmendra. The film was India's entry to the 41st Academy Awards for Best Foreign Language Film. The film Bahu Begum was directed by M. Sadiq, starring Kumari, Pradeep Kumar and Ashok Kumar. The film features music by Roshan and lyrics by Sahir Ludhianvi. Noor Jehan, directed by Mohammed Sadiq, is a historical film starring Kumari and Pradeep Kumar, with Helen and Johnny Walker in minor roles. It dramatises the epic love story of Empress Nur Jehan and her husband, the Mughal Emperor Jehangir. The film Chandan Ka Palna was directed by Ismail Memon, starring Kumari and Dharmendra. After the Eclipse, a 37 minutes color documentary directed by S. Sukhdev and shot in the suburbs of Varanasi features Kumari's voice along with that of Shashi Kapoor.
- 1968: Baharon Ki Manzil a suspense thriller, directed by Yakub Hassan Rizvi, stars Kumari, Dharmendra, Rehman and Farida Jalal. The film was one of the major hits of the year. The film Abhilasha was directed by Amit Bose. The cast includes Kumari, Sanjay Khan and Nanda.

=== Career slump and final works ===
By the early 1970s, Kumari eventually shifted her focus to more 'acting oriented' or character roles.

- 1970: Jawab was directed by Ramanna, starring Kumari, Jeetendra, Leena Chandavarkar and Ashok Kumar. Saat Phere was directed by Sundar Dhar, with Kumari, Pradeep Kumar and Mukri in pivotal roles.
- 1971: Mere Apne written and directed by Gulzar, was his first directorial venture. The film stars Kumari, Vinod Khanna and Shatrughan Sinha in lead roles along with Deven Verma, Paintal, Asit Sen, Asrani, Danny Denzongpa, Keshto Mukherjee, A. K. Hangal, Dinesh Thakur, Mehmood and Yogeeta Bali. Dushmun, directed by Dulal Guha, stars Kumari, Rehman and Rajesh Khanna with Mumtaz in lead roles. The film became a "super-hit" at the box office.
- 1972: Gomti Ke Kinare directed by Saawan Kumar Tak in his directorial debut, stars Kumari, Sanjay Khan and Mumtaz. Gomti Ke Kinare was released on 22 November 1972, after Kumari's death and was a tribute to her.

=== Completion of Pakeezah (1956–72) ===
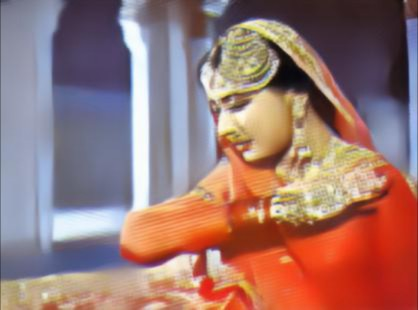
Meena Kumari in a still from Pakeezah.

The idea for Pakeezah came into existence in 1954, followed by its muhrat in 1956. Kumari was determined to complete the film and, aware of having limited time left to live, went out of her way to complete it early. Despite the rapid deterioration of her health, she made the finishing touches to her performance.

Pakeezah had a grand premiere on 3 February 1972 at Maratha Mandir theatre in central Bombay, and the prints were carried on a decked-up palanquin. The film was finally released on the following day, 4 February 1972. Pakeezah enjoyed a successful run of 33 weeks and even celebrated its silver jubilee. Kumari posthumously received her twelfth and last Filmfare nomination for Pakeezah. Bengal Film Journalists' Association Awards bestowed the Special Award to Kumari for Pakeezah in 1973.

=== Career as a playback singer ===
Kumari was also a playback singer. She sang as a child artist for films like Bahen until 1945. As a heroine, she sang for films like Duniya Ek Sarai (1946), Piya Ghar Aaja (1948), Bichchade Balam (1948) and Pinjre Ke Panchhi (1966). She also sang for Pakeezah (1972), however, the song was not used in the film and was later released in the album Pakeezah-Rang Ba Rang (1977).

=== Works as a poet ===
Kumari was an Urdu poet under the pseudonym Naaz. Historian Philip Bounds and researcher Daisy Hasan wrote of Kumari's poetry: "Poetry was the medium through which Kumari distanced herself from her public image and criticized the industry that had brought her to public attention in the first place. In that sense, her poems tell us as much about Bollywood as they do about herself."

- I write, I recite – an album consisting of Kumari's poems under the label of LP Vinyl Record was released in 1971, for which Mohammed Zahur Khayyam gave music. The poetry in the album (nazms) has been written, recited and sung by the poet herself. The album was re-released on 19 September 2006.
- Tanha Chand (Lonely Moon), a collection of Kumari's poems, was compiled by Gulzar and published after her death in 1972.
- Meena Kumari, the Poet: A Life Beyond Cinema consisting of the late actress's poems and nazms was also published in 2014.

== Personal life ==
=== Marriage to Kamal Amrohi (1952) ===
Kamal Amrohi met Kumari in 1938, while searching for a child actor for the film Jailor. Years later, on the sets of Tamasha, Ashok Kumar introduced him to Kumari, who later offered her a lead role in his upcoming film Anarkali. The contract was signed on 13 March 1951 but on 21 May 1951, Kumari was involved in a car accident while returning from Mahabaleshwar to Bombay. She was admitted to Sassoon Hospital in Poona for an injury to the left hand and Amrohi visited her regularly.

This hospital love affair continued for four months. The accident left Kumari with a banded left little finger for life. She covered her left hand with a dupatta or saree during shoots. The film Anarkali was eventually shelved. On 14 February 1952, Kumari and Amrohi secretly married in a simple "Niqah" ceremony in the presence of a Qadi and Kumari's younger sister, Mahliqa (Madhu). After the ceremony, the newlyweds parted. Amrohi left for Sion and Kumari and Madhu returned home. The marriage was kept secret from the family and media, although Amrohi was already married and had three children from his previous wife. After several months, the marriage was leaked and Ali Bux recommended a divorce. Kumari remained adamant on her decision, but stayed in her father's house. Meanwhile, Amrohi planned a film called Daaera in 1953 and decided to cast Kumari, now his wife. She unsuccessfully asked for her father's permission, then left for her husband's residence at Sion.

=== Separation from Amrohi (1964) ===
While the marriage initially began as a professional and romantic partnership, biographers and contemporaries later described it as a period of significant emotional and physical "torment." After their marriage, Amrohi allowed Kumari to continue her acting career on certain conditions but he established a "suffocating" environment for Kumari, imposing strict rules on her professional conduct. These included mandates that she be home by 6:00 PM and that no men be allowed in her makeup room. She agreed, but with passing time she kept breaking them. Abrar Alvi, director of Sahib Bibi Aur Ghulam, recounts how Amrohi would have his spy and right-hand man Baqar Ali present even in the makeup room while his wife's makeup was being done.

According to Vinod Mehta, writer of her biography, Kumari was subjected to physical abuse in her marriage and reports of physical altercations were frequent. He points out that although Amrohi repeatedly denied any such allegations, he learned from six different sources that she suffered. Events shared by actress Nargis pointed to the same. Such rumours found their base on the mahurat of Pinjre Ke Panchhi where Amrohi's assistant, Baqar Ali had a violent argument with Kumari. it was alleged that Ali slapped Kumari during the production of the same movie after a disagreement. She immediately called for Amrohi who instead insisted that she return home. An enraged Kumari went to her sister, Madhu's home and never returned to Amrohi's.

Kumari empathized greatly with Marilyn Monroe, and the fact that Marilyn's husband, Arthur Miller, had some passing similarities to her husband Kamal Amrohi, made the identification closer.

=== Impact on health and alcohol dependency ===
Kumari had chronic insomnia. Upon her physician's advice, she started taking a small peg of brandy as a sleeping pill alternative. The domestic tension led Kumari to seek refuge in heavy drinking. While doctors initially prescribed a small amount of brandy to help her sleep, she eventually developed a chronic dependency on alcohol to cope with her marital distress. After that, Kumari's name was associated with Gulzar, Dharmendra and Sawan Kumar Tak.Industry peers, including actress Nargis, noted that they often saw Kumari with physical bruises and swollen eyes, suggesting systematic abuse by Amrohi's inner circle.

=== Relationship with Madhubala ===
Despite their personal history regarding Kamal Amrohi, Madhubala was a known admirer of Meena Kumari's acting prowess. This was most notably documented following the release of the film Sharada (1957), in which Kumari played the challenging role of a woman who accidentally marries her lover's father, thus becoming her lover's stepmother.

While many contemporary actresses had reportedly turned down the role due to its controversial nature, Kumari's performance earned widespread acclaim. Madhubala was deeply impressed by the portrayal and is famously quoted as saying:

Meena, I have seen your work in Sharada. No one else could have done justice to that role the way you did. You are a great actress.

— Madhubala to Meena Kumari, Vinod Mehta, Meena Kumari: The Classic Biography

Madhubala's sister, Madhur Brij Bhushan, later confirmed in interviews that Madhubala considered Kumari her only real contemporary in terms of acting talent and often sought out her films to study her performances.

Madhubala died on 23 February 1969, shortly after her 36th birthday. Her funeral was attended by numerous industry contemporaries, despite the strained relationships of the preceding decade. Among the attendees was Kumari, who was herself battling advanced liver cirrhosis at the time. Kumari had initially rushed to Madhubala's residence, but arrived after the funeral procession had already left for the cemetery. Despite her fragile health, Kumari followed the procession to the Juhu Muslim Cemetery.

Upon seeing Kumari's frail and pale condition at the graveside, Nargis reportedly expressed shock, questioning why she had risked her health to attend. Kumari reportedly replied, "I had to see her one last time." Film historians view this gesture as a significant act of closure between the two icons, whose lives were often compared by the public.

=== Nargis's tribute ===
Meena Kumari and Nargis shared a close personal bond. Nargis was one of the few contemporaries who witnessed the private struggles Kumari faced within her marriage to Kamal Amrohi. Nargis frequently visited Kumari on film sets and expressed concern over her deteriorating health and the presence of "surveillance" by Amrohi's associates. Following Kumari's death in 1972, Nargis wrote a candid tribute in the Urdu magazine Shama. The letter, titled "Maut Mubarak Ho" (Congratulations on your death), revealed the mistreatment she had witnessed.

Nargis detailed how she had witnessed Baqar Ali's mistreatment of Kumari and how Kumari had become a "money-making machine" for those around her, concluding her belief that Kumari's death was the only escape from the "torment" she faced in life. Nargis prepared Meena's body for her funeral. As a chairman of Meena Kumari Memorial Trust, she presented Rs 50,000 for Home for the Blind in 1973.

== Illness and death ==
=== Deteriorating health and treatment in London (1968) ===
In 1968, Kumari was diagnosed with cirrhosis of the liver and received treatments in London and Switzerland in June 1968.

Upon recovery, Kumari returned to India in September 1968 and resumed work. She temporarily recovered but was now frail. After returning from London, Kumari for the first time purchased her own home, which was on the eleventh floor of a building called "Landmark", situated at Carter Road, Bandra.

=== Death ===
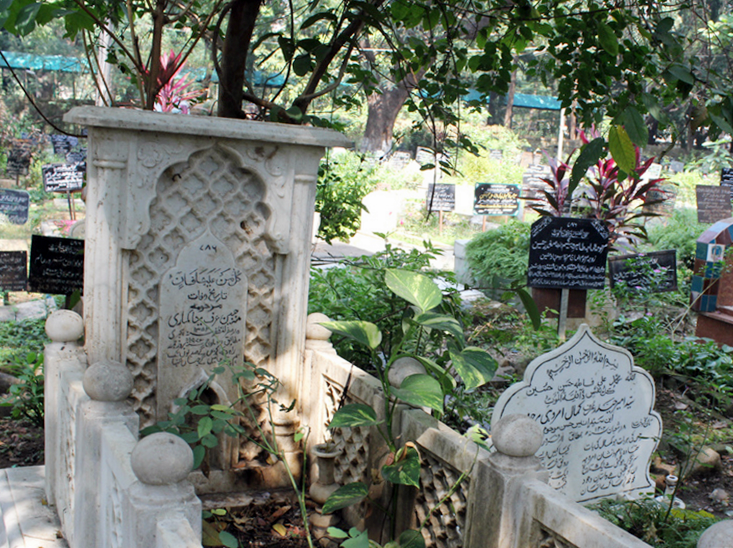
Meena Kumari's grave

Three weeks after the release of Pakeezah, Kumari became seriously ill. On 28 March 1972, she was admitted to St Elizabeth's Nursing Home.

She slipped into a coma two days later and died shortly afterwards on 31 March 1972. She was 38 years old. The cause of her death was determined to be liver cirrhosis. As per her husband's wish, she was buried at Rehmatabad Cemetery, located at Narialwadi, Mazagaon, Bombay. Kumari requested the following prose for her tombstone: "She ended life with a broken fiddle, with a broken song, with a broken heart, but not a single regret." As per his wish, upon his death on 11 February 1993 in Bombay, her husband was buried next to her.

=== Aftermath ===
On the day that Kumari died, her 1952 film Baiju Bawra was re-released at Bombay's Super cinema, drawing a full audience, which wept copiously while remembering the actress. Shortly after her death, fellow actress Nargis wrote a personal essay in an Urdu magazine – Shama, titled "Meena – Maut Mubarak Ho" (English: Congratulations on your death Meena). In October 1973, she also established the Meena Kumari Memorial for the Blind in her memory and was the chairman of this trust.

== Public image ==
"In her youth, her eyes emitted fire. She was stunning. Her complexion had a sensuous quality to it. When you saw her, you felt like grabbing her in your arms."

— Dev Anand on Meena Kumari (Filmfare, 1989)

Kumari featured in Box Office India's "Top Actresses" list from 1952 to 1961. Various publications including Hindustan Times mentioned her among the topmost sex symbols of Bollywood.

Kumari was credited for never using products like glycerin to shed tears, but always shed genuine tears while acting. At the peak of her career, she was the highest-paid actress of her generation, and was the first to buy an Impala car. In 1953, soon after the success of Baiju Bawra, Kumari appeared in Dream House, an advertisement by Dunlopillo UK along with Ashok Kumar. According to critic Bhawana Somaaya, "There was a time when top heroes were not willing to work with Meena Kumari, because she played the powerful roles". Biographer Vinod Mehta said, "Meena Kumari became so powerful that she would make or break stars, Kumari adopted an attitude of guardian, artistic mentor towards the newcomers who worked opposite her like Rajendra Kumar in Chirag Kahan Roshni Kahan and with Sunil Dutt in Ek Hi Raasta." Kumari helped Dharmendra enormously in the initial stages of his career, and established his acting career in Indian Cinema.

=== Reception among film personalities ===
The Kathak master Pandit Lachhu Maharaj praised Kumari's dancing skills. He said, "The way in which she would turn, the angles of her shoulders, come naturally to her and cannot be taught." Ashok Kumar said: "Meena was a natural actress. She was very choosy, but once she accepted a role, she put her heart into it and it's not surprising that she's still remembered for her sensitive portrayals. Sometimes when saying a dialogue I'd add a line not in the script and even as I worried about how Meena would react, she'd surprise me with just the right response." He further commented that "Meena Kumari will remain the greatest artiste the Indian screen has ever known." Vinod Mehta (writer of Meena Kumari – The Classic Biography) was told by a director: "Even Dilip Kumar (the tragedy king) found it difficult to keep his calm in front of her". Raaj Kumar would often forget his dialogues while working with Kumari on set. Madhubala was also a fan of Kumari and said: "She has the most unique voice. No other heroine has it." Satyajit Ray described her as "undoubtedly an actress of the highest calibre". Waheeda Rehman regarded her as an idol and called her a national treasure. Amitabh Bachchan said "No one, not any one, ever spoke dialogues the way Meena Kumari did .. no one .. not anyone to date.. and perhaps never will". Music Director Naushad said "Hindi film industry may produce great actresses but there would never be another Meena Kumari".

== Legacy ==
The greatest hallmark of Kumari is her ability to depict the struggle of Indian women existing especially in the 1950s and 1960s. Her onscreen persona is described as a perfect example of an "ideal Indian woman" by the Indian film fraternity, such as Mohammed Zahur Khayyam and Javed Akhtar. Her portrayal of "Sahibjaan", a nautch girl with a golden heart in Pakeezah under Amrohi's direction became a historical document.

Kumari has been ranked among the listings of top actresses of Hindi cinema. In 2011, Rediff listed her as the fourth-greatest Indian actress of all time, noting, "Her performance Sahib Bibi Aur Ghulam, is one of the finest by any leading lady in any motion picture, one where the craft is so perfect that it becomes impossible to draw a line between actress and character." In 2012, Kumari was placed at No. 3 by NDTV in the listing of "The most popular Bollywood actresses of all time". In 2021, Time Out placed her 3rd in its "The ten best Bollywood actresses" list. In 2022, she was placed in Outlook India's "75 Best Bollywood Actresses" list. In 2023, Rajeev Masand listed her in a similar list.

"Had she lived, it is possible she could have inspired the more intelligent of our writers and directors to put together a film worthy of her talents. Now she is gone, that source of inspiration is gone."

— Khwaja Ahmad Abbas on Meena Kumari (Meena Kumari The Classic Biography)

Kumari's performances, as well as her films, have earned acclaim among 21st century critics. Critic Afeefa Banu describes her as "an object of fantasy and a motif of melancholy", while Bhawana Somaaya remarks, "Pakeezah is just like poetry on celluloid, I cannot imagine anybody else in this movie except Meena Kumari." In 2010, Filmfare included Kumari's performances in Sahib Bibi Aur Ghulam and Pakeezah in its list of Bollywood's "80 Iconic Performances". Two of her films, namely Baiju Bawra and Do Bigha Zameen, have been considered among the greatest films in a poll by the British Film Institute. On the occasion of the centenary of Indian cinema, in a poll conducted by News18 her films Pakeezah, Sahib Bibi Aur Ghulam and Do Bigha Zameen featured in the list of 100 best films ever made.

Kumari has inspired modern day actors and filmmakers. Actress Kangana Ranaut comments, "In her heydays, media and film industry called Meena Kumari the actress among heroines", and filmmaker Karan Johar calls her "beautiful, majestic, absolutely stunning and nuanced actor Indian cinema ever had." Actress Tara Sutaria termed Meena Kumari "fascinating" and said that her generation misses out on Kumari's "adaa and nazaaqat". During the filming of Heeramandi, a webseries which chronicles the life of courtesans of Lahore, filmmaker Sanjay Leela Bhansali and actress Richa Chadha clearly cited Kumari and her film Pakeezah as their inspiration. Actress Alia Bhatt also mentioned watching Kumari's films for preparing for the role of a brothel madame in Gangubai Kathiawadi.

=== Cultural impact ===
Every year, on her birthday, numerous articles are printed and television programmes aired to commemorate her, and modern magazines continue to publish stories on her personal life and career. Cultural professor Rachel Dwyer notes that "Meena Kumari was a heroine of the post-Independence cinema [just as] Alia Bhatt is of today's post-Bollywood".

Kumari set fashion trends which are still in high demand. Javed Akhtar points out that women in the 1950s used to follow her sober and dignified fashion trends ranging from the hair bun to the traditional bindi. Director Sanjay Leela Bhansali has said that he appreciates the aesthetics of Pakeezah and the way Kumari played the role with grace and beauty. Her floral or traditional Banarasi silk and Kanjeevaram saris have never gone out of fashion and continue to be a favourite of designers like Sabyasachi Mukherjee. Tajdar Amrohi said: "When the shooting of Pakeezah started again in 1969, the first song shot was "Mausam Hai Ashiqaana". With this song, Kumari set a new fashion trend of girls wearing Lungi.

On 24 February 2016, Kumari's original publicity material and memorabilia, including paintings and portraits of her films, were displayed at the Womanhood Festival at Osianama Liberty, Mumbai, India. In 2023, an exhibition at Kiran Nadar Museum of Art, named "Sitaare Zameen Par", featured portraits of Kumari that were captured by JH Thakkar. Her souvenirs were auctioned online, along with that of other actresses, in the same year.

=== Honours and commemorations ===
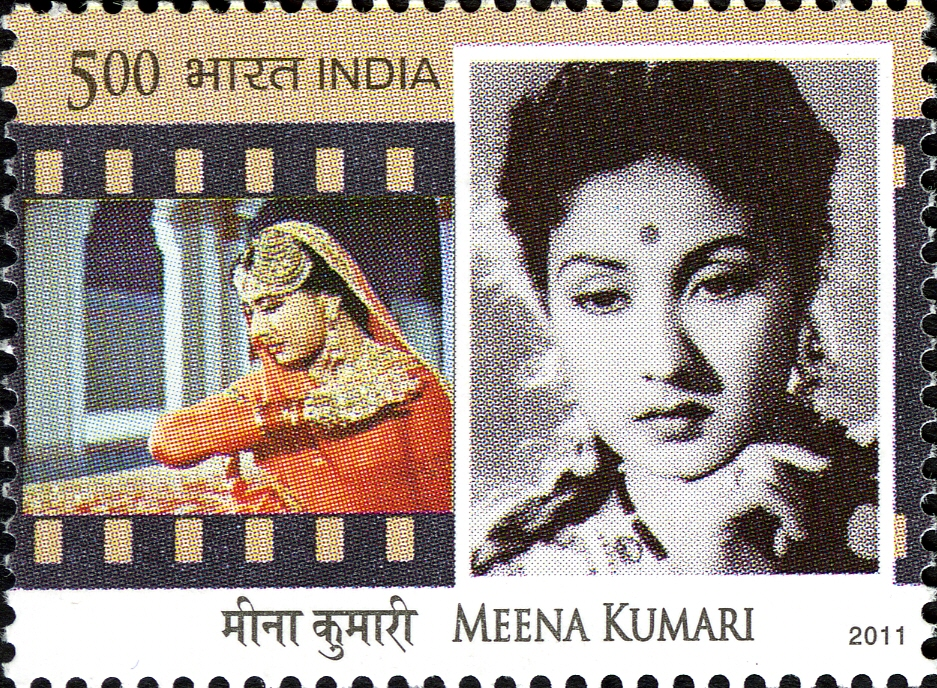
Kumari on 2011 stamp of India

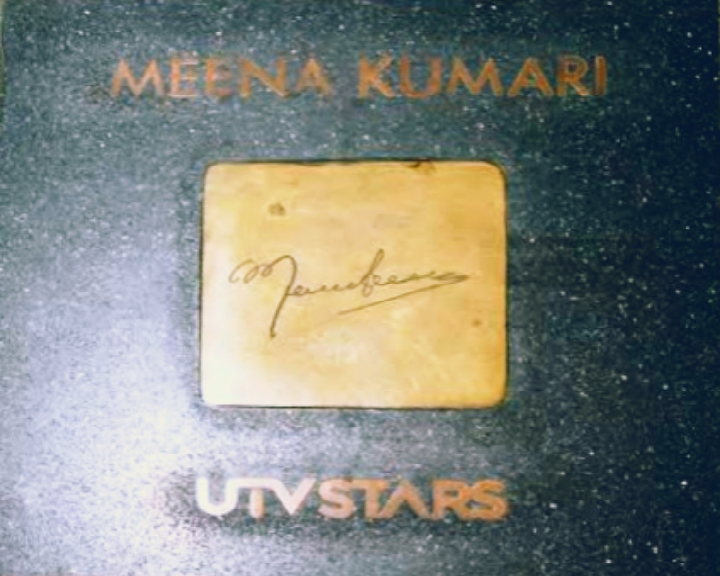
Meena Kumari's autograph at Walk of the Stars (c. 2013)

Meena Kumari commemorated with a doodle

A postal stamp of face value 500 paise was issued in her honour on 13 February 2011 by India Post. In 2012, Walk of the Stars, a section of the Bandstand Promenade in Bandra, Mumbai was opened to honour film artists from Hindi film industry. Kumari's autograph was also featured along with statues, handprints and autographs of other artists. Walk of the Stars was dissolved in 2014. On 1 August 2018, search engine Google commemorated Kumari with a Doodle on her 85th birth anniversary. Google commented:

"Kumari captivated audiences with her beautiful, expressive eyes and portrayed strong yet vulnerable women who made their own way through life, often devastated by romance. Today, her screen appearances are studied for flawless moments and the complex emotions she could evoke without uttering a word".

On the occasion of Meena Kumari's 91st birth anniversary in 2024, sculptor Pankaj Bhargava unveiled a sculpture dedicated to her in Jaipur.

== In popular culture ==
=== Biographies ===
- One of the first biographies of Kumari was written just after her death by Vinod Mehta in October 1972. The official biography of Kumari was titled Meena Kumari: The Classic Biography. The biography was re-published in May 2013.
- Simply Scandalous authored by Mohan Deep was an unofficial biography published in 1998. It was serialized in Mumbai's Hindi daily Dopahar Ka Saamna.
- Another biography about Kumari, Aakhri Adhai Din was written in Hindi by Madhup Sharma. The book was published in 2006.

=== Depictions on stage and screen ===
- In 1979, Meena Kumari Ki Amar Kahani (English: The immortal story of Meena Kumari), a film dedicated to the late actress was released. It was directed by Sohrab Modi and featured exclusive interviews of various film personalities, such as Raj Kapoor and Rajendra Kumar. The music for the film was composed by Khayyam.
- The following year, Shaira (alternatively titled Sahira) (English: Poetess) was released. It was a short documentary about Kumari and was directed by S Sukh Dev along with Gulzar. This documentary was produced by Kanta Sukhdev.
- Actress Sridevi parodied Meena Kumari in the 1990 song "Main Lagti Hoon Sridevi" from the film Naaka Bandi.
- In 2007, Priyanka Chopra parodied Kumari, Nargis and Madhubala in the film Salaam-e-Ishq.
- In May 2018, Ajeeb Dastaan Hai Yeh, a play depicting her life was staged at Rangayan auditorium of Jawahar Kala Kendra in Jaipur.
- In 2025, Chalte Chalte, a play based on Kumari and her love for poetry was staged at Delhi's LTG Auditorium. It was directed by M Sayeed Alam, with Tarannum Ahmed playing the titular role.

=== Proposed biopics ===
- In 2015, it was reported that Tigmanshu Dhulia was to make a film on her, which was to be a screen adaptation of Vinod Mehta's book, "Meena Kumari – The Classic Biography". Actress Kangana Ranaut was approached to portray Kumari but the film was shelved yet again due to lack of authentic facts and after a strong protest by Kumari's stepson Tajdar Amrohi.
- In 2017, director Karan Razdan also decided to direct an official biopic on Kumari. For this, he approached Madhuri Dixit and Vidya Balan to portray her onscreen but due to a variety of reasons, both of them declined the offer. He later turned to actress Sunny Leone who showed great interest. Various other actresses including Richa Chadha, Jaya Prada, Janhvi Kapoor, Karishma Sharma, Anupriya Goenka, Bhumi Pednekar, Divya Dutta, Kriti Sanon, Nithya Menon, Tripti Dimri, and Rasika Duggal have also expressed their wish to be cast as Kumari in her biopic.
- In 2018, producer and former child artist Kutty Padmini announced a biopic on Kumari in the form of a web series along with singer Mohammed Rafi and actor-director J.P. Chandrababu. Padmini worked with Kumari in the film Dil Ek Mandir and wanted to honour the late actress with this biopic.
- In 2020, Almighty Motion Pictures announced a web series on Kumari's life which is to be based on the book Mahjabeen as Meena Kumari written by journalist Ashwini Bhatnagar. This was followed by Tajdar Amrohi's objection who accused the journalist of not only writing the late actress' biography without his consent but also portraying Kamal Amrohi as a tormentor. Bhatnagar later clarified that the book never portrayed Amrohi in a negative light and primarily focused on Kumari's professional career. He later argued that Kumari was a public figure and no one has the right to grant permission for creating a work of art. The series which will be followed by a feature film will be helmed by producer Prabhleen Kaur Sandhu.
- In February 2022, music label Saregama and actor Bilal Amrohi (grandson of Kamal Amrohi) announced a web series about the love story of Kumari and her filmmaker husband Kamal Amrohi against the backdrop of making the film Pakeezah. The series which will be helmed by Yoodlee films is expected to go on floors in 2023.
- In March 2022, it was reported that Kriti Sanon has been approached to play Kumari in a biopic planned by T–Series. By April 2022, the makers chose Hansal Mehta to be the director of the film, who was later replaced by designer Manish Malhotra in July 2023. This film was however shelved, as of November 2024.
- In September 2024, director Siddharth P. Malhotra, announced Kamal Aur Meena, an official biopic focusing on the tumultuous relationship between Kumari and her husband Kamal Amrohi in collaboration with the Amrohi family. The film which will be written by Bhavani Iyer and Kausar Munir with lyrics penned by Irshad Kamil and music by A. R. Rahman, is expected to release in 2026. By November 2025, actress Kiara Advani was finalized to play Meena Kumari onscreen in the same project.
- Mahjabeen, a documentary based on the late star and her impact on the masses, came into the picture by late 2024. Helmed by filmmaker Geetika Narang Abbasi, the documentary features Maanik Mahna, who presents the film from a fan's point of view. The film was a work-in-progress project which featured in Cinevesture Chandigarh that took place in March 2025.

=== Remakes of her films ===
- In 2004, a modern-day adaption of her film Sahib Bibi Aur Ghulam was to be made by Pritish Nandy Communications in which Aishwarya Rai and later Priyanka Chopra were to portray her role of Chhoti Bahu. However, the film got shelved and paved the way for a TV series helmed by director Rituparno Ghosh in which actress Raveena Tandon took this role.
- In 2019, Sanjay Leela Bhansali announced the remake of Kumari's 1952 classic Baiju Bawra with Alia Bhatt reprising Gauri's character, a role which was originally played by Kumari. Actress Deepika Padukone also expressed her desire to essay Kumari's role in the same film. The shooting of the film however hasn't started, as of January 2024
- In 2023, a Pakistani remake of the film Pakeezah was also announced in which actress Meera Jee was confirmed to play the central character, which was portrayed by Kumari in the original.
