= Jagir (1959 film) =

1959 Indian Hindi film

- Directed by: Jag Mohan Mattu
- Produced by: L. M. Movies
- Starring: Prem Nath; Meena Kumari
- Music by: Madan Mohan
- Release date: 1959
- Country: India
- Language: Hindi

Jagir is a 1959 Indian Hindi-language film directed by Jag Mohan Mattu. The film stars Prem Nath and Meena Kumari; and features a soundtrack composed by Madan Mohan.

The film premiered at Swastik Theater in Bombay on 5 June 1959. It was one of the last successful films of Prem Nath as a lead actor.

== Plot ==
Author Ashok Raj describes Jagir as "a reform drama located at the feudal-modern divide".

After Prem Nath's character's father, a wealthy doctor, refuses to treat the jagirdar's injured son, the jagirdar abducts the doctor's son and raises him on his estate. The boy is subsequently drawn into a life of crime, while the jagirdar, who shelters several poor families on his land, eventually encourages him to reform and return to respectable society.

== Cast ==
- Prem Nath
- Meena Kumari
- Ulhas
- Kuldip Kaur
- Mehmood
- Niranjan Sharma
- Heeralal
- Sheela Vaz
