= Satta Bazaar =

1959 film by Ravindra Dave

- Poster
- Directed by: Ravindra Dave
- Written by: Khwaja Ahmad Abbas; Mohanlal G. Dave; S. M. Abbas
- Produced by: Ravindra Dave
- Starring: Balraj Sahni; Meena Kumari; Johnny Walker
- Music by: Kalyanji-Anandji
- Release date: 1959
- Running time: 145 minutes
- Language: Hindi

Satta Bazaar (transl. Speculative market) is a 1959 Indian Hindi-language film starring Meena Kumari and Balraj Sahni in lead roles. The music of the film was composed by Kalyanji Anandji.

== Plot ==
Ramesh (Balraj Sahni) is a widower who lives with his young daughter Kala. In order to give Kala, a mother's love, Ramesh marries Jamuna (Meena Kumari) much to the displeasure of Kala. Jamuna continues to strive to care and love her as her own, despite giving birth to a baby boy. After some years, a grown up Kala (Vijaya Chowdhury) falls in love with Shyam (Suresh), the son of Ramesh's business partner Bholanath (Asit Sen) who belongs to a different caste. Ramesh disapproves the match but is eventually convinced by Jamuna and the couple gets formally engaged. After the engagement, Ramesh soon meets Badri Prasad (Ramayan Tiwari), a multi-millionaire and starts investing in Stock exchange. While on the verge of bankruptcy, Badri offers him help in lieu of Kala's hand for his son Pritam. Will Ramesh sacrifice Kala's happiness to avoid meeting a terrible fate?

== Cast ==
- Balraj Sahni as Ramesh
- Meena Kumari as Jamna
- Johnny Walker as Jagat
- Asit Sen as Bholanath
- Ramayan Tiwari as Badri Prasad
- Moolchand as Chaman Lal
- Suresh as Shyam
- Vijaya Chowdhury as Kala

== Crew ==
- Director – Ravindra Dave
- Producer – Ravindra Dave
- Story – Mohanlal G. Dave
- Dialogues – S. M. Abbas
- Screenplay – Khwaja Ahmad Abbas
- Cinematography – W. V. Mukadam
- Music – Kalyanji Anandji
- Lyrics – Shailendra, Hasrat Jaipuri, Indeevar, Gulshan Bawra
- Playback Singers – Hemant Kumar, Lata Mangeshkar, Mohammad Rafi, Suman Kalyanpur

== Soundtrack ==
The film had nine songs in it. The music of the film was composed by Kalyanji Anandji. Shailendra, Hasrat Jaipuri, Gulshan Bawra and Indeevar wrote the lyrics.

1. "Aankde Ka Dhandha" - Mohammad Rafi. Lyrics by: Gulshan Bawra
2. "Chaandi Ke Chand Tukadon Ke Liye" - Hemant Kumar. Lyrics by: Gulshan Bawra
3. "Zaraa Theharo Ji" - Suman Kalyanpur, Mohammad Rafi. Lyrics by: Hasrat Jaipuri
4. "Tumhe Yaad Hoga" - Lata Mangeshkar, Hemant Kumar. Lyrics by: Gulshan Bawra
5. "Ja Ja Na Chhed Maan Bhi Ja" - Mohammad Rafi, Suman Kalyanpur. Lyrics by: Shailendra
6. "Kehti Hai Meri Aankhe" - Lata Mangeshkar. Lyrics by: Hasrat Jaipuri
7. "Kya Raha Jaane Ko" - Lata Mangeshkar. Lyrics by: Indeevar
8. "Kaisa Insaf Tera" - Lata Mangeshkar. Lyrics by: Indeevar
9. "Ye Duniya Rang Badalti Hai"
