= Ardhangini (1959 film) =

1959 film directed by Ajit Chakrabarty

- Directed by: Ajit Chakrabarty
- Screenplay by: Vishwamitter Adil; Shashi Bhushan
- Story by: Chandrakant
- Produced by: Ajit Chakrabarty
- Starring: Meena Kumari; Raaj Kumar
- Cinematography: R. M. Sabnis
- Edited by: C. Ramrao
- Music by: Vasant Desai
- Production companies: Mars and Movies
- Release date: 1959
- Country: India
- Language: Hindi

Ardhangini (transl. The better half) is a 1959 Indian Hindi-language romance film produced and directed by Ajit Chakrabarty. The film stars Meena Kumari and Raaj Kumar. It was later remade in Tamil as Panithirai (1961).

== Plot ==
A woman dies while giving birth to her daughter Chhaya. The girl's father loses his job and the family home is burned. For this reason, everyone around her superstitiously see her as a harbinger of bad luck. Chhaya falls in love with Prakash, a non-superstitious airline pilot who treats her normally, but problems arise when Prakash's aeroplane goes missing.

== Cast ==
- Meena Kumari as Chhaya
- Raaj Kumar as Capt Prakash
- Agha as Murari
- C. S. Dube as Prakash's maternal uncle
- Shivraj as Ram Lal
- Durga Khote as Prakash's mother
- Praveen Paul as Murari's mother
- Shubha Khote as Leela

== Production ==
Ardhangini was produced and directed by Ajit Chakrabarty under Mars and Movies. The film's story was written by Chandrakant, the screenplay by Vishwamitter Adil and Shashi Bhushan, and the dialogues by Vishwamitter Adil. Cinematography was handled by R. M. Sabnis, and editing by C. Ramrao.

== Themes ==
The film speaks against untouchability and superstitious beliefs. Many commentators have identified it as a "romantic tragi-comedy".

== Soundtrack ==
The soundtrack was composed by Vasant Desai, and the lyrics were written by Majrooh Sultanpuri.

No.	Title	Singer(s)	Length
1.	"Dil Hum To Haare"	Geeta Dutt, Mohammed Rafi	3:32
2.	"Tera Khat Leke Sanam"	Lata Mangeshkar	3:24
3.	"Kal Saajna Milna Yahan"	Geeta Dutt, Mohammed Rafi	3:15
4.	"Tu Ne Jo Idhar Dekha"	Geeta Dutt, Mohammed Rafi	3:16
5.	"Bade Bhole Ho"	Lata Mangeshkar	3:30
6.	"Apne Saiyan Se Naina Ladaibe"	Lata Mangeshkar	3:17
7.	"Oh Pyaar Main Milna Sanam Hota Hai Takdeer Se"	Subir Sen, Lata Mangeshkar

== Reception ==
The Indian Express wrote, "Imaginatively directed by Ajit [Chakrabarty], the film should appeal to family audiences".

== Bibliography ==
- Grodal, Torben Kragh; Larsen, Bente; Laursen, Iben Thorving, eds. (2005). Visual Authorship: Creativity and Intentionality in Media. Museum Tusculanum Press. ISBN 9788763501286.
- Hogan, Patrick Colm (2009). Understanding Indian Movies: Culture, Cognition, and Cinematic Imagination. University of Texas Press. ISBN 978-0-292-77955-6.
