= Ahinsa (1979 film) =

1979 film directed by Chand

- Directed by: Chand
- Produced by: Shiv Kumar
- Starring: Sunil Dutt; Rekha
- Music by: Kalyanji-Anandji
- Release date: 1979
- Running time: 103 min
- Country: India
- Language: Hindi

Ahinsa (transl. Non-Violence) is a 1979 Bollywood action film produced by Shiv Kumar and directed by Chand. The film stars Sunil Dutt and Rekha in lead roles along with Nirupa Roy, Ranjeet and Premnath. The film was successful at the box office.

== Cast ==
- Sunil Dutt as Brijmohan "Birju"
- Rekha as Radha
- Ranjeet as Ramnath "Ram" / Raka
- Nirupa Roy as Birju's Mother
- Premnath as Shambhunath
- Trilok Kapoor
- Asrani as Pandit
- P. Jairaj as Radha's Father
- Jayshree T. as Mujra Dancer

== Soundtrack ==
Song	Singer
"Main Hoon Kaun, Yeh Tujhko Nahin Hai Pata"	Mohammed Rafi, Manna Dey
"Mujhe Dena Re Badhai Gaonwalon"	Mohammed Rafi, Asha Bhosle
"Maine Tan Man De Dala"	Asha Bhosle
"Thoda Thoda Sach"	Asha Bhosle
