= Himalay Se Ooncha =

- Movie Poster
- Directed by: B.S. Thapa
- Starring: Sunil Dutt
- Music by: Kalyanji Anandji
- Release date: 1975
- Country: India
- Language: Hindi

Himalay Se Ooncha (lit. 'Higher than the Himalayas') is a 1975 Indian Hindi-language action film directed by B.S. Thapa. The film stars Sunil Dutt as a reluctant mountaineer. The title is based on H. P. S. Ahluwalia's book Higher than the Everest (1973) about the 1965 Indian Everest Expedition. Ahluwalia also served as a consultant for the film.

== Cast ==
- Sunil Dutt as Vijay
- Mallika Sarabhai as Kanchan
- Ranjeet as Ranjeet
- Rakesh Pandey as Captain George
- Raju Desai as Raju
- Master Bittoo as Bittoo
- Nandita Thakur as Geeta Sharma
- Shiv Kumar as Bhushan
- P. Jairaj as Chief SN of Kathmandu Tower
- Randhir as Plane Passenger Ratanlal who requested for soil
- Ram Sethi as Plane passenger Pyarelal who tested calling button
- Sunder as Plane Passenger Hasmukh who recognized Devraj by guess
- Ram Mohan as Ram Singh
- Karan Dewan as Peter
- M. Rajan as Mr. Verma
- Jankidas as Plane Passenger Sitaram with a book in his hand
- Dev Kumar Passenger Zalim at the airport

== Music ==
The music was composed by Kalyanji-Anandji.

1. "Upar Wale Re Ajab Teri Maya" – Manna Dey
2. "Rahi O Rahi Tere Sar Pe Duaao Ke Saaye Rahe" – Lata Mangeshkar
3. "Are Kaha Gaya Kidhar Gaya" – Kanchan, Baby Shivangi
4. "O Sathi Re Pyar Jisko Kehte Hai" – Lata Mangeshkar
