= Man Jeete Jag Jeet =

- Directed by: B.S. Thapa
- Written by: K. Sarshar
- Story by: S. Mohinder
- Produced by: Kunwar Mohinder Singh Bedi Sahar
- Starring: Sunil Dutt; Radha Saluja; Ranjeet; Khairati; Jankidass Bhardwaj; Omi Chopra; Gurbachchan Singh; Gursharan Singh (theatre director); Gopal Sehgal; Madhumati; Sona; Om Prakash; Harbhajan Jabbal; Hemraj Sharma; Mukri
- Cinematography: Ram Chander
- Edited by: D.N. Pai
- Music by: S. Mohinder
- Release date: 21 September 1973
- Country: India
- Language: Punjabi

Man Jeete Jag Jeet is a 1973 religious Punjabi film directed by B.S. Thapa, starring Sunil Dutt, Radha Saluja and Ranjeet in lead roles.

== Music ==
Songs were composed by S. Mohinder, and Inderjit Hasanpuri wrote the lyrics. Many texts are taken from the Gurbani (from the Sikh religious text, Guru Granth Sahib). Asha Bhosle, Suman Kalyanpur and Mohammad Rafi are the playback singers.

1. Ram Gaiyo Ravan Gaiyo-(Asha Bhosle)
2. Uda-Ada-Edi-Sassa-Haha Bolna Kade Naa Dolna-Suman Kalyanpur
3. Jis Ke Sar Upar Tu Swami-(Asha Bhosle)
4. Jagat Meh Jhoothi Dekhi Preet-[Mohalla-9] (Asha Bhosle)
5. Tu V Daku Te Mein V Daku-(Asha Bhosle)
6. Jadon-Jadon V Banere Bole Kaa-(Asha Bhosle)
7. Paapi Jiodeya Bol Satnam-(Asha Bhosle)
8. Jis Ke Sar Upar Tu Swami-(Shabad) Mohammad Rafi
9. Farida Kaale Mainde Kapre-(Mohammad Rafi)
10. Paapi Jiodeya Bol Satnam-(Asha Bhosle, Mohammad Rafi)

== See also ==
- Nanak Nam Jahaz Hai
