= Yeh Aag Kab Bujhegi =

- Directed by: Sunil Dutt
- Produced by: Sunil Dutt
- Starring: Sunil Dutt; Rekha; Sheeba; Shakti Kapoor
- Music by: Ravindra Jain
- Release date: 19 April 1991
- Country: India
- Language: Hindi

Yeh Aag Kab Bujhegi (transl. when will this fire go out) is a 1991 Indian film directed by Sunil Dutt. It stars Sunil Dutt, Rekha in lead roles along with debutante Sheeba. It was the last film produced by Ajanta Arts. The lyrics and music for the film were by Ravindra Jain

== Plot ==
Professor Krishnanand is giving a social message against dowry. He heads the department of sociology in his college. He lives with his mother and his only daughter Pooja.

Radha, a professor of law admires Krishnanand in his crusade against dowry. Radha was engaged to Ranveer; but on the day of their marriage, when Ranveer's father demands dowry meanwhile Radha cancels the marriage. Radha's father commits suicide thereafter. Radha then establishes a support society for female dowry victims with moral support from Krishnanand.

Pooja's marriage is arranged with Mohan but Mohan's mother is unhappy as there is no dowry. Mohan and his evil brother-in-law make various plans and force Pooja to ask for money from her father. However, on the day of Karwa Chauth Pooja finds out that her husband and his family are plotting to kill Krishnanand for his property. In order to save himself Mohan kills Pooja with the help of his family. News is planted that Pooja's death was an accident.

Krishnanand makes an unsuccessful attempt to seek justice for his daughter; Mohan is released due to lack of evidence. A heartbroken Krishnanand decides to take revenge. On Diwali night he records the confession of Mohan and his family and kills Mohan and Roshan Lal.

In the courtroom Krishnanand stops Judge Ranveer from passing judgement and declares that he killed Mohan and Roshan Lal to avenge his daughter's death and reveals that the investigating officer was bribed. The judge reopens Pooja's murder case and the culprits are sent to judicial custody. The judge also accepts that the law needs to be improved in order protect the daughters from being dowry victims. In the climax, Krishnanand is arrested and people are shown to be supporting him.

== Cast ==
- Sunil Dutt as Professor Krishnanand
- Rekha as Professor Radha
- Sheeba Akashdeep as Pooja
- Kabir Bedi as Ranveer Singh
- Pradeep Kumar as Umrao Singh
- Satyen Kappu as Raghuveer Singh
- Dina Pathak as Pooja's Grandmother
- Shakti Kapoor as Mohan Agarwal
- Bindu as Mrs. Agrawal
- Roopesh Kumar as Kanhaiyalal Gupta
- Ranjeet as Sulaiman
- Mukri as Shankar
- Iftekhar as Judge
- Sudhir as Investigating Officer Roshanlal
- Bharat Kapoor as defence Lawyer of Mohan Agarwal
- Chandrashekhar as Senior Police Commissioner
- Moon Moon Sen as Professor Krishnanand's Wife (photo only)

== Soundtrack ==
Song	Singer
"Ae Meri Rahat-E-Jaan"	Mohammed Aziz
"Yeh Aag Kab Bujhegi"	Mohammed Aziz
"Chali Jayegi Pardes"	Lata Mangeshkar
"Jind Meriye"	Lata Mangeshkar
"My Name is Kitty Kitty, I Want A Kissy Kissy"	Kavita Krishnamurthy, Jolly Mukherjee
