= Mukri =

Indian actor (1922–2000)

Mohammed Umar Mukri
- Born: 5 January 1922; Uran, Bombay Presidency, British India (present-day Maharashtra, India)
- Died: 4 September 2000 (aged 78); Mumbai, Maharashtra, India
- Occupations: Actor, Assistant Director
- Years active: 1945–1994
- Spouse: Mumtaz Mukri (m. 1950)
- Relatives: Naseem Mukri (daughter)

Mohammed Umar Mukri (5 January 1922 – 4 September 2000), popularly known as Mukri, was an Indian actor, who worked as a comedian in Hindi films.

Born as Muhammad Umar Mukri in Uran. He started his film career as an assistant to debutant director K. Asif with Phool (1945) and as an actor with the film Pratima along with noted film actor Dilip Kumar in 1945, it was the second film for the latter. They used to be school friends at Anjuman Islam High School. Dilip Kumar was a year senior in school than Mukri whose classmate was Dilip Kumar's younger brother Nasir Khan, who also become an actor. Subsequently, in career spanning 50 years, he acted in over 600 films.

Mukri, with his toothless smile, diminutive stature and perfect comic timing amused the audiences in more than 600 films, in over six decades in Indian cinema.

His notable films are Mother India (1957), Sharaabi (1984), Amar Akbar Anthony (1977), Laawaris (1981), Bombay to Goa (1972), Gopi (1970), Kohinoor (1960) and many more.

== Career ==
He initially started his career as an assistant to K. Asif when the latter was making his directorial debut with Phool (1945). His career in films ran parallel to that of Dilip Kumar, who was his schoolmate. They made their debut with the Bombay Talkies film Pratima, also the directorial debut of actor P. Jairaj. Before joining the film industry, Mukri worked as a Qazi.

== Death and legacy ==
Mukri died in Mumbai on 4 September 2000 at the age of 78, at Lilavati Hospital due to a heart attack and kidney failure. His lifelong friend and schoolmate actor Dilip Kumar and his wife Saira Banu were present by his deathbed. Both Dilip Kumar and Sunil Dutt had also been occasionally visiting Mukri in the hospital. Mukri's oldest daughter Naseem Mukri was also there and made arrangements for her father's funeral.

Johnny Walker who worked with Mukri in at least 15 films, recalled, "He had this great pairing with Sheikh Mukhtar – one was very tall and one very short – they looked very good together and made a fine pair. They were known as Laurel and Hardy."

== Personal life ==
Mukri and his wife Mumtaz had an arranged marriage in 1950. They had 5 children; 2 daughters Naseem and Ameena and three sons Nasir, Farooque and Bilal. One of his daughters is Naseem Mukri, who wrote dialogue of movies Dhadkan and Haan Maine Bhi Pyaar Kiya. She wrote the screenplay of Dhadkan and acted in it too. His daughter, Naseem Mukri, had reportedly told the news media, "Abba was extremely religious. He also was a keen horserace enthusiast, even owned a couple. Every Sunday would see him at the races."

== Filmography ==
- Betaaj Badshah (1994) as College Principal
- Dushman Zamana (1992) as Mickey Seth, Garage Owner
- Yeh Aag Kab Bujhegi (1991) as House Servant
- Trinetra (1991) as Wrestler Show Organizer
- Izzatdaar (1990)
- Jaadugar (1989) as Nathulal
- Daata (1989) as Pandit Ram Prasad
- Gair Kaanooni (1989) as Chinnappa Malappa Shetty
- Mohabat Ka Paigham (1989)
- Ram Lakhan (1989) as Dhondu Nai
- Agnee (1988) as Santosh Sen
- Ganga Tere Desh Mein (1988) as Inmate
- Bhatakti Jawani (1988)
- Gangaa Jamunaa Saraswathi (1988) (uncredited) as Master of the house of newlyweds
- Kaash (1987) as Municipal Dog Catcher
- Hawalaat (1987) as Director (guest appearance)
- Imaandaar (1987) as Nathulal
- Parivaar (1987) as Banwari
- Ek Aur Sikander as Chacha (1986)
- Karma (1986) as Chhote Khan
- Amrit (1986) as Kamru
- Babu (1985) as Constable
- Hum Dono (1985) as Popley
- Naya Bakra (1985) as Boy
- Jhutha Sach (1984) as Politician (song "Loot Gayi")
- Meraa Dost Meraa Dushman (1984) as Harkishen
- Rakta Bandhan (1984) as Dharamdas
- Sharaabi (1984) as Natthulal
- Coolie (1983) as Mr. Iyengar
- Mahaan (1983) as Guru's foster father
- Sun Meri Laila (1983) as Ad Film Director
- Daulat Ke Dushman (1983) as Soni
- Anokha Bandhan (1982) as Kalu Mali (Gardener)
- Vidhaata (1982) as Dance Organiser
- Sun Sajna (1982)
- Dharam Kanta (1982) as Shiva's stepfather
- Khud-Daar (1982) as

Tailor Master

- Khoon Ka Rishta (1981)
- Sannata (1981)
- Lawaaris (1981) as Gaffoor Bhai
- Khoon Aur Paani (1981) as Saramji Rustomji Bochwala – man with newspaper
- Ladies Tailor (1981) (as Muqri) as Kaniz's Drummer
- Naseeb (1981) as Mehboob Bhai
- Katilon Ke Kaatil (1981)
- Umrao Jaan (1981) (uncredited) as Parnan Aziz
- Karz (1980) as College Principal
- The Burning Train (1980) as Kanhaiya
- Abdullah (1980) as Trader
- Phir Wohi Raat (1980)
- Takkar (1980)
- Yari Dushmani (1980) as Hotel manager
- Aatish (1979) as Diwan Chotelal
- Shikshaa (1979) as Parsi driving classic car
- Sawan Ko Aane Do (1979)
- Sunayana (1979) as Circus owner
- Ganga Ki Saugand (1978) as Guest appearance
- Ankh Ka Tara (1978) as Govind
- Phool Khile Hain Gulshan Gulshan (1978)
- Pandit Aur Pathan (1977) as Parheshan
- Amaanat (1977) as Mr. Lobo
- Amar Akbar Anthony (1977) as Taiyyab Ali
- Chandi Sona (1977) as Chhota
- Saheb Bahadur (1977) as Waiter
- Tyaag (1977) as Mangal Dada
- Fakira(1976) as Chimanlal's Private Secretary
- Sabse Bada Rupaiya (1976) as Phalku
- Arjun Pandit (1976)
- Bairaag (1976) (as Muqri) as Munim
- Jai Bajrang Bali (1976) as Shakun's assistant
- Bundal Baaz (1976) as Gupta
- Aa Jaa Sanam (1975)
- Andhera (1975)
- Mazaaq (1975) as Chunnilal Paan Wala
- Zorro (1975) as Maniram
- Kunwara Baap (1974) as Hawaldar (Constable)
- Naya Din Nai Raat (1974) as Stage Prompter
- Do Phool (1974) as Man who captures Pavitra
- Duniya Ka Mela (1974)
- Loafer (1973) as Bus Boy
- Heera (1973) as Manglu
- Honeymoon (1973) as Ramsingh
- Mehmaan (1973) as Bellboy
- Mere Gharib Nawaz (1973) as Afzal
- Suraj Aur Chanda (1973)
- Bombay to Goa (1972) as South Indian
- Piya Ka Ghar (1972) as Kanhaiya
- Annadata (1972) as Shaadilal
- Anokha Daan (1972)
- Apradh (1972) as German Jewelry Appraiser
- Zindagi Zindagi (1972) as Dr. Sunil's servant
- Hungama (1971) as Broker Talaram
- Rakhwala (1971) (uncredited) as Dr. Panchotiya
- Pyar Ki Kahani (1971) as Member of Banke's party
- Upaasna (1971)
- Albela (1971)
- Ek Nari Ek Brahmachari (1971) as Thakur Chandan Singh
- Johar Mehmood in Hong Kong (1971) as James
- Jwala (1971)
- Lakhon Me Ek (1971) as Makhanlal
- Main Sunder Hoon (1971) as Dattaram
- Paras (1971) as Manager
- Mastana (1970) as Dhanraj's Chauffeur
- Prem Pujari (1970) as Indian Muslim
- Bachpan (1970) as Rahim's dad
- Bhai-Bhai (1970)
- Darpan (1970)
- Devi (1970) as Sunder Das
- Gopi (1970) as Ramlal
- Mera Naam Joker (1970) as Circus Surgeon
- Suhana Safar (1970) as Mukkaramjah Mknaik 'Mukri'
- Do Raaste (1969) as Special Guest
- Bhai Bahen (1969) as Mangu
- Chirag (1969) as Tingu
- Madhavi (1969) as Kaviraj
- Meri Bhabhi (1969)
- Nannha Farishta (1969) as Chaubey
- Yakeen (1969) as Father of the guy who found body at the beach
- Aabroo (1968)
- Anokhi Raat (1968) as Naubat
- Izzat (1968) as Rondhu
- Padosan (1968) as Banarasi
- Raja Aur Runk (1968) as Sunder – Sudhir's friend
- Sadhu Aur Shaitaan (1968) as Krishnamurthy
- Vaasna (1968)
- Anita (1967)
- Chandan Ka Palna (1967) as Munshi Chhote Lal
- Duniya Nachegi (1967)
- Farz (1967) as Raju
- Hamare Gam Se Mat Khelo (1967)
- Meherban (1967) as Nathu aka Moti – Owner of Gadhamaharaj
- Milan (1967) as Jaggu
- Ram Aur Shyam (1967) as Murlidhar
- Suraj (1966) as Anokhe
- Daadi Maa (1966) as Bihari
- Johar in Kashmir (1966) as School-master
- Mera Saaya (1966) as Munshiji (Banke's Friend)
- Smuggler (1966) as Banarsi "Batlitodh"
- Johar-Mehmood in Goa (1965) as Master/Headmaster Pinto
- Bahu Beti (1965) as Kadam
- Himalay Ki Godmein (1965) as Budhimaan
- Nishan (1965)
- Char Dervesh (1964) as Masha Allah
- Phoolon Ki Sej (1964) as Jacket
- Pooja Ke Phool (1964) as Kisaan
- Bahurani (1963)
- Dev Kanya (1963)
- Phool Bane Angarey (1963)
- Aashiq (1962)
- Asli-Naqli (1962) as Nandu
- Man-Mauji (1962) .... Darbari Lal
- Sangeet Samrat Tansen (1962) .... Ustad Fateh Khan
- Son of India (1962)
- Bada Aadmi (1961)
- Anuradha (1960) .... Atmaram
- Bewaqoof (1960) .... Sherdil (Marina's dad)
- Kohinoor (1960)
- Anari (1959) .... Kamdhar (Raj Kapoor's co-worker)
- Barkha (1959) .... Shambu
- Kali Topi Lal Rumal (1959)
- Qaidi No. 911 (1959)
- Aji Bas Shukriya (1958)
- Amar Deep (1958) .... Lali
- Kala Pani (1958) .... Madhosh Miyan
- Malik (1958)
- Sohni Mahiwal (1958)
- Mother India (1957) (as Muqri) .... Shambu
- Suvarna Sundari (1957)
- Aawaz (1956)
- Chori Chori (1956) (as Muqri) .... Madarilal
- Lalten (1956)
- Paisa Hi Paisa (1956)
- Kismet Ka Khel (1956)
- Char Paise (1955)
- Inaam (1955)
- Amar (1954 film) (as Muqri) .... Advocate
- Daku Ki Ladki (1954)
- Mangu (1954)
- Mastana (1954)
- Mirza Ghalib (1954)
- Baghi (1953)
- Shahenshah (1953)
- Aan (1952) (as Muqri) .... Chandan
- Annadata (1952)
- Sazaa (1951) .... Batwa
- Jan Pahchan (1950) .... Lallu
- Pardes (1950)
- Anokha Pyar (1948)
- Mera Geet (1946)
- Pratima(1945)

Self:

- Kala Bazar (1960) .... Himself
- Shrimanji (1968) .... Himself
- Gomti Ke Kinare (1972) .... Himself
- Raj Kapoor (1987) .... Himself (during funeral)
- Sar Ankhon Par (1999) .... Himself

Archive Footage:

- Film Hi Film (1983) (uncredited)
