= Muqabla (1979 film) =

1979 Indian film by Rajkumar Kohli

- Poster
- Directed by: Rajkumar Kohli
- Starring: Sunil Dutt; Shatrughan Sinha; Reena Roy; Bindiya Goswami
- Music by: Laxmikant-Pyarelal
- Production company: Prasad Art Productions
- Release date: 14 May 1979
- Country: India
- Language: Hindi

Muqabla (transl. Match) is 1979 Hindi-language action film directed by Rajkumar Kohli. The film stars Sunil Dutt, Shatrughan Sinha, Reena Roy, and Bindiya Goswami in lead roles. Rajesh Khanna and Rekha make special appearances in a qawwali song. The film was major hit at the box office. The song Govinda Govinda remains popular and even today is played on the festival of Janmmashtami in India.

== Plot ==
"Sheru" (played by Shatrughan Sinha) and "Vicky" (played by Sunil Dutt) are both leaders of rival gangs. After successive instances of run ins and skirmishes, the pair realize that they are better off forming a truce and instead helping the local poor.

At the same time, the two fall in love with two separate women (one of which is "Lachho" (played by Reena Roy).

Despite the pair's best efforts to turn their life in a direction of positivity, they find themselves faced with spite from an old fellow gang member, Banwarilal (played by Ranjeet). In the nick of time, the two gangleaders-turned-heroes get support from a local police inspector (played by Premnath), who helps resolve the situation and avoid escalation of the conflict.

Ultimately, the two heroes fall back into a cycle of conflict and violence, this time due to spurned romance. Sheru finds out that his beloved Lachho has fallen in love with his old nemesis, Vicky, and the two then resume their age old rivalry and hatred.

== Cast ==
- Sunil Dutt as Vinod / Vikram "Vicky"
- Shatrughan Sinha as Chhaganlal "Chheno" / "Sheru"
- Reena Roy as Lachho
- Bindiya Goswami as Champa
- Rajesh Khanna as Qawwali Singer (Special Appearance)
- Rekha as Qawwali Singer (Special Appearance)
- Premnath as Police Inspector
- Madan Puri as Heeralal
- Ranjeet as Keemtilal / Banwarilal
- Valente Mascarenhas (unnamed role)

== Soundtrack ==
All music was composed by Laxmikant–Pyarelal. Lyrics were by Verma Malik.

Song	Singer
"Meri Rus Gayi"	Kishore Kumar, Asha Bhosle
"Teen Batti Wala Govinda Aala"	Kishore Kumar, Mohammed Rafi
"Aaja Na"	Asha Bhosle
"Dilwale Yaar"	Asha Bhosle, Anwar
"Muqabla Hai"	Asha Bhosle, Mahendra Kapoor
