= Dharamyudh (film) =

- Directed by: Sudarshan Nag
- Starring: Sunil Dutt; Shatrughan Sinha; Kimi Katkar
- Music by: Rajesh Roshan
- Release date: 1988
- Country: India
- Language: Hindi

Dharamyudh is a 1988 Indian Bollywood action drama film directed by Sudarshan Nag. It stars Sunil Dutt, Shatrughan Sinha, and Kimi Katkar.

== Plot ==
Pratap and Vikram Singh are two friends. Pratap's sister, Guddi was raped and murdered. Pratap is now ready to take revenge.

== Cast ==
- Sunil Dutt as Thakur Vikram Singh
- Shatrughan Sinha as Pratap Singh
- Kimi Katkar as Suman
- Aditya Pancholi as Thakur Vijay Singh "Chhotu"
- Ranjeet as Jaggu
- Pran as Thakur Zorawar Singh "Bade Thakur"
- Suresh Oberoi as Kundan
- Sushma Seth as Kundan's Mother

== Soundtrack ==
Song	Singer
"Dharamyudh Dharamyudh"	Shabbir Kumar
"Bhaiya Bhi Tu Hai" (Happy)	Lata Mangeshkar
"Bhaiya Bhi Tu Hai" (Sad)	Lata Mangeshkar
"Sawan Ka Mahina"	Asha Bhosle
"Chhoti Si Zindagi Ke Liye"	Asha Bhosle
"Sari Duniya To Do Do Ho Gayi"	Sadhana Sargam
