= Rocky (1981 film) =

1981 Indian film by Sunil Dutt

- Poster
- Directed by: Sunil Dutt (Note: The film was initially directed by Rahul Rawail but he left the project midway due to creative differences. The later portions of the film were directed by Raj Khosla as Sunil Dutt was away because of Nargis' illness.)
- Written by: Bharat B. Bhalla; Dr. Rahi Masoom Reza
- Produced by: Amarjeet
- Starring: Sanjay Dutt; Tina Munim; Reena Roy; Shakti Kapoor; Raakhee; Aruna Irani
- Cinematography: S. Ramachandra
- Edited by: Waman Bhonsle; Gurudutt Shirali
- Music by: Rahul Dev Burman
- Distributed by: Shemaroo Videos
- Release date: 6 May 1981
- Running time: 151 minutes
- Country: India
- Language: Hindi
- Box office: ₹6 crore

Rocky is a 1981 Indian romantic action film directed by Sunil Dutt. This film marks the debut of Sanjay Dutt and also stars Tina Munim, Reena Roy, Amjad Khan, Raakhee, Ranjeet, Shakti Kapoor and Aruna Irani in pivotal roles. Sunil Dutt also appears in a cameo. Aruna Irani received a Filmfare Nomination for Best Supporting Actress, the only nomination for the film. In his autobiography Anupam Kher writes that it was initially directed by Rahul Rawail but he left the project mid-way due to creative differences Sunil Dutt then finishing it. The later portions of the movie were directed by Raj Khosla, as Sunil Dutt had to be away because of his wife Nargis' cancer.

Shammi Kapoor plays himself, where he gets to judge dancers to the famous song "Aa Dekhe Zara", where Sanjay Dutt and Reena Roy as a pair compete against Shakti Kapoor and Tina Munim. The film was released only a few days after the death of Sunil's wife and Sanjay's mother, Nargis. It was ranked as the 10th highest-grossing film of 1981.

== Plot ==
Shankar is an educated young man who is employed in the construction business by Ratanlal. Shankar is also the union leader and would like Ratanlal to enforce measures for workers' safety. Before he could ensure this, Shankar is accidentally killed in a work-related accident, leaving behind his wife, Parvati, and young son, Rakesh. Rakesh is in trauma because of this incident, and this trauma is repeated in his mind every time his mother comes near him. Parvati is instructed to keep away from Rakesh, and Rakesh is adopted by Robert and his wife, Kathy and they rename him, Rocky.

Years later, Rocky has grown up without knowing who his biological mother is. Rocky's lifestyle is carefree until he falls in love with Renuka. It is then that he learns that he is really Rakesh and that his mother is still alive, and his father did not die accidentally but was murdered. Rocky sets out to avenge his father's death. He gets help from a rape survivor. But he doesn't know that his days, along with those of his near and dear ones, may also be numbered.

== Cast ==
- Sanjay Dutt as Rakesh / Rocky D'Souza
- Sunil Dutt as Shankar (Guest appearance), Rakesh's biological father
- Reena Roy as Lajwanti / Hirabai
- Tina Munim as Renuka Seth
- Ranjeet as Jagdish aka "J.D."
- Aruna Irani as Kathy D'Souza
- Shakti Kapoor as R.D.
- Amjad Khan as Robert D'Souza, Rocky's adopted father
- Raakhee as Parvati, Rakesh's biological mother
- Shashikala as Sophia
- Iftekhar as Dr. Bhagwandas
- Satyen Kappu as Ram Avtar
- Anwar Hussain as Ratanlal
- Agha as Professor
- Chandrashekar Dubey as man at the courtesan's place
- Gopi Krishna as Dance Teacher of Lajwanti
- Shiv Kumar as Advocate Sharma
- Keshto Mukherjee as Drunk Driver
- Jalal Agha as himself
- Sudha Chopra as Dugganjaan
- Gulshan Grover as Jagga
- Shammi Kapoor as himself (Cameo role)
- Chunky Pandey as Boy ringing the bell in the classroom (Cameo role)

== Music ==
The music for the film is composed by R. D. Burman and the lyrics are written by Anand Bakshi. Aa Dekhen Zara became particularly hit and is often heard on dance competitions.

No.	Title	Singer(s)	Length
1.	"Kya Yehi Pyar Hai"	Kishore Kumar, Lata Mangeshkar	06:24
2.	"Aa Dekhen Zara"	Kishore Kumar, Asha Bhosle, Amit Kumar	08:31
3.	"Aao Mere Yaaro Aao"	Kishore Kumar	04:24
4.	"Geet Sunoge Huzoor"	Asha Bhosle	03:06
5.	"Doston Ko Salam"	Kishore Kumar	06:06
6.	"Hum Tumse Mile"	Kishore Kumar, Lata Mangeshkar	06:00
7.	"Dance Music"	Gopi Krishan	02:55
