= Pran Jaye Per Vachan Na Jaye =

- Theatrical poster
- Directed by: S. Ali Raza
- Written by: S. Ali Raza
- Produced by: Ratan Mohan
- Starring: Sunil Dutt; Rekha
- Cinematography: V. R. Reddy
- Edited by: Pran Mehra
- Music by: O. P. Nayyar
- Production company: R. M. Art Productions
- Release date: 8 February 1974
- Country: India
- Language: Hindi

Pran Jaye Per Vachan Na Jaye (lit. 'Life may go, but not promise') is a 1974 Hindi-language action film directed by S. Ali Raza. It stars Sunil Dutt, Rekha, Bindu, Ranjeet, Jeevan, Madan Puri, Premnath, Iftekhar, Jayshree T. The music is by O. P. Nayyar.

== Plot ==
Raja Thakur (Sunil Dutt) is an outlaw who fights oppression and corruption in his own unique way. This Robin Hood like figure is a feared and respected figure among the villagers and when he attends a dance performance given by the famous dancer Janiya (Rekha), he finds himself attracted to her. He shows his feelings openly but this proves to be a hindrance to Janiya – people now consider her to be the exclusive property of the outlaw and fear to ask her to perform for them. A rival gang kidnaps Janiya and invoke the wrath of Raja Thakur. Now Raja Thakur will have to leave the rural area, where he rules, and go into an unknown territory, to deal with unknown gangsters, and he must do so in order to keep his word.

== Cast ==
- Sunil Dutt as Raja Thakur
- Rekha as Janiya
- Bindu as Lily
- Ranjeet as Bandit
- Jeevan as Dharamdas
- Madan Puri as Jagmohan
- Premnath as Mangal Singh
- Iftekhar as Dhanraj
- Jayshree T. as Dancer / Singer

== Music ==
The music was composed by O. P. Nayyar and the lyrics were by S. H. Bihari and Ahmed Wasi. All songs are sung by Asha Bhosle. Asha Bhosle won Filmfare Best Female Playback Singer for the song, "Chain Se Humko Kabhi". Though the song was not used in film.

Song	Singer
"Aa Ke Dard Jawan Hai"	Asha Bhosle
"Bikaner Ki Chunri Odhi"	Asha Bhosle
"Chain Se Humko Kabhi"	Asha Bhosle
"Dekho Raja Dekho"	Asha Bhosle
"Dekho Arey Dilbar"	Asha Bhosle
"Ek Tu Hai Piya"	Asha Bhosle

== Awards ==
- Filmfare Best Female Playback Singer Award for Asha Bhosle singing "Chain Se Humko Kabhi"
