= Ram Kasam =

- Directed by: Chand
- Written by: Prabhkar Shrifad Wagle
- Screenplay by: K. B. Pathak
- Produced by: S. D. Narang
- Starring: Sunil Dutt; Rekha; Bindiya Goswami
- Cinematography: Prakash Digpal
- Music by: Sonik Omi
- Release date: 11 August 1978
- Country: India
- Language: Hindi

Ram Kasam is a 1978 Bollywood action film directed by Chand, with music by Sonik Omi and lyrics by Verma Malik. The film is based on the Dacoity of the Chambal division; bandits of Morena and Chambal, thronging the locales of the mountainous valleys of the Chambal River. It has Sunil Dutt in a double role; as a simpleton, and as a dacoit, with love interests as Rekha and Bindiya Goswami. The film is an inspiring tale portraying ritualistic Hinduism and characters who show traits of their bloodline irrespective of the social setup that they have been forced into. The film was successful at the box office .

== Story ==
The story starts with a stormy sea and strong winds which are wrecking a ship carrying the family of Inspector Ajit Singh, his wife Laxmi and twins Ajay and Vijay. Terror struck they are thrown on the waves of the angry seas and land on drifting pieces of wood, on the shores of India. Laxmi becomes blind with shock, although Ajay is saved with her, whom she names Bhola, seeking refuge with a Zamindar, to work as their menial chores servant. Meanwhile Vijay is misled to a life of crime and becomes Shankar, with his gangster moll being Suzy.

Ajit Singh who goes to the local police station to lodge a complaint about his missing family, expresses a desire to stay back in India, to the serving Inspector Jagdish Raj, who impressed by his honesty and zeal gets him recruited in to the police set-up, calling his service record from Africa.

Shankar who has become a famous dacoit, intercepts a truck carrying looted valuables to loot, but is hounded by none other than Inspector Ajit Singh, who however fails to arrest him, due to Suzy and Shankar escaping into a nightclub, where they don the garbs of artists and start performing a dance item. Their entire loot is then carried into Shankar's hide out where Shankar tells his gang members that looting heinous criminals is not a sin. Further he insults Suzy when she disrespects an Om symbol locket which was given to Shankar by his lost mother, as being worthless in a cache of priceless jewels. This irks Suzy who with Johnny betrays Shankar to the police when he goes to loot a train. Shankar is caught with the loot and jailed with dacoits of the Chambal division. He manages to escape with them, and to punish Suzy for her betrayal, brings her to this lair of thieves.

Meanwhile, Bhola is shown to be very loyal to the Zamindar, whose own son, called Chhote Thakur, is no less than a dacoit, out to loot his own family of all assets and belongings, for a life of vice and sin and ill treating Bhola for his efforts to save the same. The Zamindar is taken ill and dies telling about all his treasures to Bhola. Shankar who has also taken refuge with the dacoits in the same village is again betrayed by Suzy and saved by Radha (Rekha). Shankar and Radha falls for each other soon, on the other side, Bhola and Champa fall in love.

Bhola is framed in a false theft by Chhote Thakur and jailed. Shankar who is being pursued by the police lands in the house of Laxmi who being blind thinks that it is her son Bhola who has come to meet her. In a series of twists and turns Shankar realises that she is his lost mother and Bhola his twin. Taking the place of Bhola he metes out avenging punishments to all those who had ill treated Bhola. When his mother is captured by Chhote Thakur as hostage for bringing all the family wealth back to him, both Bhola and Shankar interchange roles and not only avenge this, but return the entire wealth of the village to the government, after punishing the dacoits. Inspector Ajit Singh who has also reached the scene of crime recognises his lost family. Laxmi also regains her sight after being treated properly at a local hospital. Both Radha and Champa, who are the love interests of Shankar and Bhola respectively, help in restoring happiness to the village, as well as peace returns with law and order. Inspector Ajit Singh however, arrests Shankar for his petty crimes, promising him an early release for helping the police.

== Cast ==
- Sunil Dutt as Ajay Singh / Bhola & Vijay Singh / Shankar (Double Role)
- Rekha as Radha
- Bindiya Goswami as Champa
- Nirupa Roy as Laxmi Singh
- Ajit as Inspector Ajit Singh
- Jeevan as Lala
- Amjad Khan as Chhote Thakur
- Bindu as Suzy
- Sudhir as Johnny
- D. K. Sapru as Zamindar
- Jankidas
- Jagdish Raj as Inspector
- C. S. Dubey

== Soundtrack ==
Song	Singer
"Kajre Ki Kasam, Gajre Ki Kasam"	Lata Mangeshkar, Mohammed Rafi
"Main Chhokariya Ke Jaalwa Mein Kaise"	Asha Bhosle, Mahendra Kapoor
"Aaj Teri Mehfil Mein Kuch Ho Jayega"	Asha Bhosle, Manna Dey
"Do Milte To"	Asha Bhosle, Omi
"Meri Majboor Jawani"	Asha Bhosle
