= Anwar Hussain (actor) =

Indian film actor (1925–1988)

- Born: 11 November 1925; Calcutta, Bengal Presidency, British India
- Died: 2 January 1988 (aged 62); Bombay, Maharashtra, India
- Occupations: Actor, producer
- Years active: 1940–1987
- Mother: Jaddanbai
- Relatives: Dutt family

Anwar Hussain (11 November 1925 – 2 January 1988) was an Indian actor and producer. He was a popular character actor from the 1940s to 1982 and acted in over 200 Bollywood films.

Some of his best-known roles are from Ab Dilli Dur Nahin, Gunga Jumna (1961), Shaheed, Baharon Ke Sapne, Victoria No. 203 (1972), Chori Mera Kaam, Loafer, Gaddar, Rafoo Chakkar and Jail Yatra.

== Early life ==
Anwar Hussain was born on 11 November 1925 in Calcutta, British India. He was the son of singer-turned director Jaddanbai and thus, maternal half-brother to noted actress Nargis Dutt and Akhtar Hussain.

Hussain is also known for his role in Rocky (1981) with his nephew Sanjay Dutt.

== Death ==
Anwar Hussain died on 2 January 1988 in Mumbai, India at age 62.

== Selected filmography ==
Year	Title	Role	Language	
1943	Sanjog		Hindi	
1944	Pehle Aap		Hindi	
1951	Hum Log	Kundan	Hindi	
1953	Jhamela		Hindi	
1953	Footpath	Ram	Hindi	
1953	Yahudi	Antonio	Hindi	
1957	Bhabhi	Jeevan	Hindi	
1957	Ab Dilli Dur Nahin	Mukundlal	Hindi	
1958	Police	Ramesh	Hindi	
1958	Amar Deep	Thief / Conman	Hindi	
1961	Chhote Nawab		Hindi	
1961	Gunga Jumna	Hariram	Hindi	
1962	Asli-Naqli	Mohan	Hindi	
1963	Shehar Aur Sapna		Hindi	
1963	Laagi Nahi Chhute Ram		Bhojpuri	
1965	Guide	Gaffoor	Hindi	
1965	Shaheed	Jail warden Chattar Singh	Hindi	
1965	1966	Mera Saaya	Police Inspector	Hindi
1967	Hamraaz	Captain Mahendra	Hindi	
1967	Kade Dhupp Kade Chhaan		Punjabi movie	
1967	Raat Aur Din	Doctor	Hindi	
1967	Baharon Ke Sapne	Friend	Hindi	
1967	Nai Roshni	Ramzan	Hindi	
1967	Chand Par Chadayee	Barahatu	Hindi	
1967	Night in London	Colonel Fuji	Hindi	
1968	Anokhi Raat	Ram Das	Hindi	
1969	Yakeen	Mr. D'Mello	Hindi	
1969	Aadmi Aur Insaan	Gupta	Hindi	
1970	Dastak	Marativale	Hindi	
1971	Balidaan		Hindi	
1971	Upaasna	John Dsouza	Hindi	
1971	Pyar Ki Kahani		Hindi	
1971	Dushman	Timber Merchant	Hindi	
1972	Zindagi Zindagi	Patient Dayaram	Hindi	
1972	Annadata		Hindi	
1972	Ek Bechara		Hindi	
1972	Kankan De Ohle	Bandit Kartar Singh aka Kartara Daku	Punjabi	
1972	Victoria No. 203		Hindi	
1973	Mehmaan	Anwar	Hindi	
1973	Loafer	Mr. Sinha	Hindi	
1973	Jheel Ke Us Paar	Hariya	Hindi	
1973	Gaddar		Hindi	
1973	Jaise Ko Taisa	Shyamlal "Mamaji"	Hindi	
1973	Heera	Changu	Hindi	
1974	Imaan		Hindi	
1974	Dost	Ustad Monto Sardar	Hindi	
1974	Bidaai	Magan	Hindi	
1975	Aag Aur Toofan		Hindi	
1975	Lafange	Diwan Chamanlal	Hindi	
1975	Rafoo Chakkar	Ranjit	Hindi	
1975	Jaggu	Desai	Hindi	
1975	Chori Mera Kaam	Amarchand Rathod	Hindi	
1976	Adalat	Ajit Singh	Hindi	
1976	Shankar Shambhu	Kundan	Hindi	
1978	Kaala Aadmi	Ajit	Hindi	
1978	Ganga Ki Saugandh	Premi Gangaram		Hindi
1979	Heera-Moti	Johnny	Hindi	
1979	Nauker		Hindi	
1981	Jail Yatra	Police Inspector	Hindi	
1981	Rocky	Ratanlal	Hindi	
