= Zindagi Zindagi =

1972 Indian film directed by Tapan Sinha

- Poster
- Directed by: Tapan Sinha
- Produced by: Nariman Irani
- Starring: Sunil Dutt; Deb Mukherjee; Waheeda Rehman; Farida Jalal; Ashok Kumar
- Music by: S. D. Burman
- Production company: Nariman Films
- Release date: 1972
- Country: India
- Language: Hindi

Zindagi Zindagi (transl. Life, Life) is a 1972 Indian Hindi-language romance film directed by Tapan Sinha. The film stars Sunil Dutt, Deb Mukherjee, Waheeda Rehman, Farida Jalal and Ashok Kumar. The film revolves around life in a village hospital and has casteism as an issue at its core. It had a soundtrack by S. D. Burman, which fetched him a National Award for Best Music. It is a remake of Sinha's 1959 Bengali hit Khoniker Atithi.

== Synopsis ==
This movie revolves around a village hospital that was built by a generous hearted man, Choudhury Ramprasad who is also a patient in the hospital. The other patients include Isamil, Dayaram, Ratan, and the doctor is Dr. Sunil. Amongst the patient is a singer, who loves Shyama a worker in the hospital. When Meeta Sharma comes to the hospital to admit her son, she meets Sunil who she loved during college days, but her uncle and aunt reject their marriage due to casteism and gets Meeta married to Brahmin Engineer who dies in a railway accident leaving Meeta with a five-year-old child Babu who becomes paralytic due to a fall from a staircase. In the background of the hospital atmosphere is an election in the village, which is proceeding smoothly, but causing a disturbance is Ramprasad's son Shiv Prasad. Ramprasad wins the election but on his death bed. Sunil gets Babu successfully operated but is unable to walk due to no confidence. Ratan a TB patient recovers and leaves the hospital with Shyama a hospital worker to get married. Shiv Prasad instigates everyone about an affair between Sunil and Meeta which is solved after a quarrel. Dr Sunil gets the confidence of Babu with the help of other children, who coax him to run around playfully, finally Babu starts walking and Meeta relents to an urging Dr Sunil to join him in the hospital services, so that both can raise Babu to be a doctor.

== Cast ==
- Sunil Dutt as Dr. Sunil Singh
- Waheeda Rehman as Meeta Sharma
- Ramesh Deo as Shiv Prasad (Ram's son)
- Jalal Agha as Ratan (ex-soldier)
- Chhaya Devi as Mrs. Singh, Sunil's mother
- Anwar Hussain as Patient Dayaram
- Iftekhar as Patient Ismail
- Farida Jalal as Shyama (Hospital Worker)
- Ashok Kumar as Ram Prasad (Hospital benefactor / Patient / Politician / Shiv's father)
- Deb Mukherjee as Heera (Patient / Singer)
- Mrinal Mukherjee as Compounder Kishore
- Nasir Khan as Principal Dr. Mukherjee
- Sameer Roy as Loknath (Social Activist)
- Ruby Meyers as Senior Matron
- Mukri as Ramu (Dr. Sunil's servant)
- Gajanan Jagirdar as Mr. Sharma (Meeta's uncle)
- Shyama as Chachi (Meeta's aunt)
- Chand Usmani as Leela
- Master Tito as Babu (Meeta's son)
- Mukri as Ramu (Sunil's servant)
- Narbada Shankar as Brahmin / Pandit
- Jankidas as Loknath's Assistant

== Soundtrack ==
Zindagi Zindagi

Soundtrack album by S. D. Burman
- Released: 1972
- Genre: Feature film soundtrack
- Length: 33:00
- Language: Hindi
- Label: Saregama
- Producer: S. D. Burman

S. D. Burman chronology
Yeh Gulistan Hamara (1972)	Zindagi Zindagi (1972)	Anuraag (1972)

All lyrics are written by Anand Bakshi; all music is composed by S.D. Burman

Songs
No.	Title	Singer(s)	Length
1.	"Zindagi Ae Zindagi"	S.D. Burman	4:27
2.	"Piya Tune Kya Kiya Re"	S.D. Burman	4:11
3.	"Khush Raho Sathio"	Kishore Kumar & Lata Mangeshkar	4:09
4.	"Kaun Sachcha Hai Aur Kaun Jhutha"	Manna Dey	3:27
5.	"Teri Jaat Kya Hai"	Kishore Kumar	3:17
6.	"Tune Hamen Kya Diya Ri Zindagi"	Kishore Kumar	4:53
7.	"Mera Sab Kuchh Mere Geet Re"	Manna Dey	4:37
Total length:			33:00
