= Kaala Aadmi =

- Directed by: Ramesh Lakhanpal
- Starring: Sunil Dutt; Saira Banu; Pran
- Music by: Laxmikant–Pyarelal
- Release date: 1978
- Country: India
- Language: Hindi

Kaala Aadmi is a 1978 Bollywood film directed by Ramesh Lakhanpal.

== Cast ==
- Sunil Dutt as Birju
- Saira Banu as Sheetal
- Pran as Dharam Prakash
- Ranjeet as Hari Prakash
- Premnath as Guruji (Special Appearance)
- Parikshat Sahni as Aslam
- Naaz as Sayeeda
- Sonia Sahni as Hari's Wife
- Zaheera as Birju's Keep
- Anwar Hussain as Ajit
- Satyendra Kapoor as Mr. Gupta
- Urmila Bhatt as Mrs. Gupta
- Helen
- Jayshree T.
- Alankar Joshi

== Music ==
Lyrics: Verma Malik

Song	Singer
"Hey Jag Paalak, Srishti Ke Maalik"	Suman Kalyanpur, Manna Dey
"Aaj Hamen Ek Jaan Ka Dushman, Jaan Se Pyara Lagta Hai"	Asha Bhosle, Mohammed Rafi, Manna Dey
"Kisi Tarah Se Koi Raat Ko Lamba Kar Do"	Asha Bhosle, Usha Mangeshkar
"Bujha Do Diye"	Asha Bhosle
"Tujh Pe Jo Vishwas"	Manna Dey, Suman Kalyanpur
"Choona Paaye Koi Choona Paaye Koi"	Manna Dey, Suman Kalyanpur
