= Loafer (1973 film) =

- Directed by: A. Bhimsingh
- Written by: Jagdish Kanwal
- Screenplay by: Nabendu Ghosh
- Story by: Vijay
- Produced by: R. C. Kumar
- Starring: Dharmendra; Mumtaz
- Cinematography: Rajendra Malone
- Edited by: A. Paul Durai Singham
- Music by: Laxmikant–Pyarelal
- Production company: Century Films
- Distributed by: Century Films
- Release date: 16 March 1973
- Running time: 135 mins
- Country: India
- Language: Hindi
- Box office: ₹4,50,00,000

Loafer is a 1973 Indian Hindi film directed by A. Bhimsingh. The film stars Dharmendra, Mumtaz in lead roles, with Om Prakash, Premnath, K. N. Singh in other important roles. The music for the film was composed by Laxmikant-Pyarelal.

The film was the 7th highest grossing hindi-language film of 1973.

== Plot ==
Ranjeet is a shiftless loafer and pickpocket working for a gang. He falls in love with Anju, but does not know she is spying on him for the leader of a rival gang. The gang leader tries to set a trap for Ranjeet, but Anju warns him and he escapes. Ranjeet also tries to help his friend, an apple vendor, pretend to be rich because he has lied to his daughter and said that he is a wealthy businessman. Meanwhile, Ranjeet must steal some jewels before the other gang steals them first. With the aid of a walking dog toy he tries to steal the jewels and Anju tells the gang leader that she will no longer spy on Ranjeet since she has fallen in love with him too.

== Cast ==
- Dharmendra as Ranjeet
- Mumtaz as Anju
- K. N. Singh as Mr. Singh
- Premnath as Pratap
- Om Prakash as Gopinath
- Farida Jalal as Roopa
- Madan Puri as Mr. Puri
- Anwar Hussain as Mr. Sinha
- Manmohan as Pritam, Singh's agent
- Hiralal as Saxena , Singh's agent
- Ramayan Tiwari as TT, Singh's agent
- Bhushan Tiwari as Chirijanlal , Pratap's man
- Iftekhar as Police Commissioner Shyam Singh
- Mukri as Shambhunath Singh Rathod, Ranjeet's man
- Raj Mehra as Rajendranath Mehra
- Anil Dhawan as Anil Mehra
- Shaukat Kaifi as Sushila, Anju's mother
- Randhir as Money Lender Jholjhaal
- Keshto Mukherjee as Drunk Gangu
- Roopesh Kumar as Rakesh
- Padma Khanna as Dancer

== Music ==
Laxmikant-Pyarelal has composed the music and Anand Bakshi has penned the lyrics.

Song	Singer	Raga
"Main Tere Ishq Mein"	Lata Mangeshkar	
"Koi Shehri Babu"	Asha Bhosle	
"Kahan Hai Woh Deewana"	Asha Bhosle	
"Motiyon Ki Ladi Hoon Main"	Asha Bhosle	
"Aaj Mausam Bada Be-Imaan"	Mohammed Rafi	Pahadi
"Duniya Mein Tera Hai"	Mahendra Kapoor	
