= Zameen Aasmaan (1972 film) =

- Directed by: A Veerappan
- Written by: Kishore Kumar
- Produced by: A Veerappan; Kishore Kumar
- Starring: Ashok Kumar; Sunil Dutt; Rekha; Yogeeta Bali
- Edited by: Dinendra Lalch
- Music by: Kishore Kumar
- Release date: 1972
- Country: India
- Language: Hindi

Zameen Aasmaan (lit. 'Earth, Sky') is a 1972 Hindi action film directed by A. Veerappan. The music was composed by Kishore Kumar. It has the popular songs "Kisne Yahan Kisko Jaana", "Na Ro Aye Mere Dil", "Hum Tum Chale" and " Aankhen Tumhari Do Jahan".

== Cast ==
- Ashok Kumar as Shanti Swaroop
- Sunil Dutt as Ravi
- Rekha as Kalpana
- Yogeeta Bali as Roopa
- Sharad Kumar as Ram
- Indrani Mukherjee as Ganga / Maya (Double Role)
- Achala Sachdev as Hameeda
- Dulari as Ganga
- Ramesh Deo as Heeralal "Heera"

== Soundtrack ==
Song	Singer
"Aankhen Tumhari Do Jahan"	Kishore Kumar
"Bakhuda Khullam Khulla"	Kishore Kumar
"Hum Tum Chale, Tum Chale, Hum Chale"	Kishore Kumar, Asha Bhosle
"Ek Raat Ki Hai Baat"	Asha Bhosle
"Kisne Yahan Kisko Jana"	Asha Bhosle
"Na Ro Ae Mere Dil Yahan"	Lata Mangeshkar
