= Khoon Aur Paani =

- Poster
- Directed by: Chand
- Screenplay by: K.B. Pathak
- Story by: Chand
- Produced by: A.A. Nadiadwala
- Starring: Feroz Khan; Jeetendra; Rekha; Parveen Babi
- Cinematography: Sudhin Mazumdhar
- Edited by: Waman Bhonsle; Gurudutt Shirali
- Music by: Laxmikant–Pyarelal
- Production company: A.G.Films Pvt Ltd
- Release date: 10 April 1981
- Running time: 138 minutes
- Country: India
- Language: Hindi

Khoon Aur Paani (transl. Blood and water) is a 1981 Hindi-language action film, produced by A. A. Nadiadwala under the A.G.Films Pvt. Ltd. banner and directed by Chand. It stars Feroz Khan, Jeetendra, Rekha, Parveen Babi and music composed by Laxmikant–Pyarelal.

== Plot ==
Singh is a farmer and lives a poor lifestyle along with his wife Mrs. Singh and two sons, Ram and Laxman. The region is drought-stricken, while in contrast, there is plenty of water being pumped to bathe the dogs of Thakur Vikram Singh. When Ram decides to divert some water for their parched fields, Vikram Singh kills his father. An enraged Ram goes to avenge his death, manages to kill Vikram's brother Badi Thakur, but is seriously injured, loses his memory and ends up with a gang of bandits and is renamed Thanedar Singh, as he was dressed in the clothes of a police inspector. Lakshman also gets separated from his mother and is found near a river bank by Police Commissioner Bhalla, who adopts him. Years later, the two brothers are fated to meet again, albeit, as strangers and mortal enemies, Ram is dreaded bandit Thanedar Singh a dacoit, who is unable to recall his childhood, and loses control whenever he hears the sound of a water-pump and Laxman is an incognito CBI Officer Rakesh. The remaining story shows how two brothers unite with their mother.

== Cast ==
- Feroz Khan as Ram Singh / Thanedar Singh
- Jeetendra as Laxman Singh / CBI Inspector Rakesh / Rocky / Raka
- Rekha as Champa
- Parveen Babi as Rita
- Rajesh Khanna as Himself (Special Appearance)
- Nirupa Roy as Mrs. Singh
- Ranjeet as Vijay Singh
- Ajit as Thakur Vikram Singh
- Satyendra Kapoor as Shakal
- Iftekhar as DSP Khan
- P. Jairaj as Mr. Singh
- Om Shivpuri as Police Commissioner Bhalla
- Mukri as Saramji Rustamji Bochwala
- Jagdeep as Havaldar Maan Singh Gandotra
- Jagdish Raj as Johnny
- Habib as Sardar
- Master Bittoo as Young Ram
- Master Raju as Young Laxman Singh
- Master Romi as Young Vijay

== Soundtrack ==
Song	Singer
"Mat Ja, Mat Ja, Royega Dil Mera, Dilruba, Haay Na Ja"	Kishore Kumar, Asha Bhosle
"Duje Ki Biwi Gori Lage, Apni Biwi Kaali"	Kishore Kumar, Mahendra Kapoor
"Kangna Pahena Maine Ghunghroowala"	Lata Mangeshkar
"Duniya Ke Sitam Humko Juda Kar Nahin Sakte"	Lata Mangeshkar, Asha Bhosle
