= Daaku Aur Jawan =

- Directed by: Sunil Dutt
- Produced by: Jagdish Sharma; Som Dutt
- Starring: Sunil Dutt; Vinod Khanna; Reena Roy; Leena Chandavarkar
- Production company: Veena Films
- Release date: 1978
- Country: India
- Language: Hindi
- Budget: ₹11 million
- Box office: ₹38 million

Daaku Aur Jawan is a 1978 Bollywood film directed and starring by Sunil Dutt alongwith Reena Roy, Vinod Khanna and Leena Chandavarkar in lead roles. The film was a superhit at the box office.

== Plot ==
Birju and Ramu are brothers and have a friendly bond with each other, they perform many pranks on the villagers, but the pressure of the landlord and the urban bad guy Bhairon Singh leads villagers to pay a fee for their lands to work on them. This leads Ramu to join the army as a Jawan (Soldier). Bhairon Singh, with the help of Thakurain plans to frame Birju as a criminal on the night of Janamashtmi. Bhairon Singh brutally rapes Ganga and steals the entire wealth from the safe of her father. After being raped by Bhairon Singh, Ganga commits suicide by jumping into the well. Bhairon Singh frames Birju for the rape and murder of Ganga and stealing the money. Birju is arrested by the police, but escapes and takes a pledge on Ganga's funeral pyre that he will take revenge of her death and he turns into a Daaku (Dacoit). Ramu, in the war, is fighting against enemies, but gets back to his village after losing one leg. After a lot of turns and twists, Seeta finally reveals the truth that Bhairon Singh raped Ganga and he has stolen all the wealth from her house with the help of Thakurain. When Birju learns of it, he beats Bhairon Singh in front of all the villagers and finally kills him by throwing him into the well where Ganga committed suicide. Now, Thakurain tries to kill Ramu, but Birju takes the bullet in his chest saving Ramu in the process. Thakurain is arrested by the police. Birju, finally breathing his last, requests Ramu to read the letter which was written by him. After listening to the letter from Ramu, Birju dies reuniting with Ganga in Heaven. In the end, Ramu marries Seeta and they live happily ever after.

== Cast ==
- Sunil Dutt as Birju
- Reena Roy as Ganga
- Vinod Khanna as Ramu
- Leena Chandavarkar as Seeta
- Bindu as Thakurian
- Ranjeet as Bhairon Singh

== Music ==
Lyrics: Anand Bakshi

Song	Singer
"Rakh Di Haay Beech Sadak Maine Gagariya"	Kishore Kumar, Asha Bhosle
"Jhoola Jhoolat Kanhaiya Re"	Asha Bhosle, Lata Mangeshkar
"Mere Desh Ke Rang Pyare Pyare"	Mohammed Rafi, Anuradha Paudwal
"Dharti Gaaye Re, Aaye Re Khushi Ke Din Aaye Re"	Mohammed Rafi, Mukesh, Anuradha Paudwal
