= Heera (film) =

- Directed by: Sultan Ahmed
- Written by: Sultan Ahmed (screenplay); K.B. Pathak (story); Wajahat Mirza (dialogue)
- Produced by: Sultan Ahmed
- Starring: Sunil Dutt; Asha Parekh; Shatrughan Sinha; Farida Jalal
- Cinematography: R.D. Mathur
- Edited by: M.S. Shinde
- Music by: Kalyanji-Anandji
- Release date: 1973
- Country: India
- Language: Hindi

Heera is a 1973 film produced and directed by Sultan Ahmed. The film stars Sunil Dutt, Asha Parekh and Shatrughan Sinha in lead roles. The film ranked ninth among the top grossers of 1973

== Plot ==
Heera lives in a small rural town in India with his father, a Magistrate, and housewife mother. He meets with the town's moneylender Dhaniram's daughter, Asha, both of them fall in love, and hope to get married soon. Before that could happen, Changu's daughter is killed and the blame put on Heera. Heera runs away to clear his name which he does in the end.

== Cast ==
- Sunil Dutt as Heera
- Asha Parekh as Asha
- Shatrughan Sinha as Balwant
- Farida Jalal as Lahariya
- Nazir Hussain as Magistrate
- Sulochana Latkar as Heera's Mother
- Anwar Hussain as Changu
- Mukri as Manglu
- Randhir as Makhanlal
- Kanhaiyalal as Lala Dhaniram
- Faryal as Gulabi
- Satyen Kappu as Heera's employer in the city
- Mac Mohan as member of the kidnapping gang
- Tabassum as Asha's friend
- Asha Potdar (guest appearance) ..girl who dies of snake bite
- Helen as and item number "Der Na Karo"

== Music ==
Kalyanji Anandji composed the music and Anjaan and Indivar wrote the lyrics.

- "Chaley Chaley Re Pawan" - Lata Mangeshkar
- "Aaj Nachoon Aise" - Lata Mangeshkar and Shatrughan Sinha
- "Ek Chhokariya" - Kishore Kumar, Asha Bhosle, Usha Khanna, Mukri and Chorus
- "Main Tuhse Milne Aayi" - Lata Mangeshkar and Mohammed Rafi
- "Der Na Karo" - Lata Mangeshkar
