= Dard Ka Rishta =

1982 Bollywood film directed by Sunil Dutt

- T-Series CD Cover
- Directed by: Sunil Dutt
- Produced by: Sunil Dutt
- Starring: Sunil Dutt; Ashok Kumar; Reena Roy; Smita Patil; Khushbu
- Music by: Rahul Dev Burman
- Release date: 1 July 1982 (India)
- Running time: 2 hours
- Country: India
- Language: Hindi

Dard Ka Rishta is a 1982 Indian Bollywood film produced and directed by Sunil Dutt, who also stars. Smita Patil, Dr. Naaz Hussein, Reena Roy and Ashok Kumar play pivotal roles. It also marked late actress, Padmini Ramachandran's (a part of the Travancore sisters) comeback to films after 12 years since Aansoo Aur Muskaan (1970).

== Plot ==
Ravi Kant (Sunil Dutt) is a doctor who lives in New York with his wife Anuradha (Smita Patil), also a doctor. Anuradha is doing research into leukemia. Ravi is nostalgic about India and decides to return there when he receives an offer for a position as the head of surgery from Tata Memorial Hospital in Bombay. Anuradha wants to continue her research and does not want to go to India. Ravi returns to India after a divorce with Anuradha. Anuradha discovers that she is pregnant with Ravi's child but Ravi is unaware of the fact. In India, while treating one of his patients Bhardwaj, he meets his daughter Asha (Reena Roy). Just before his death, Bhardwaj is promised by Ravi that he will marry Asha. Asha and Ravi are married. Asha dies while giving birth to their daughter (Khushbu). Soon after Khushboo's eleventh birthday, she is diagnosed with leukemia. On a recommendation from a fellow doctor at Tata Memorial, Ravi takes her to a hospital in New York City where Anuradha is her doctor. To cure her cancer, Khushboo must have a bone marrow transplant from a donor with matching blood group and genes. Shashi (Anuradha's son) is found to have a perfect match and he donates the marrow. Ravi discovers that Shashi is the son of him and Anuradha. In the final scene, everyone comes together at the airport when Ravi, Khusboo and Shashi are coming to India. Anuradha joins them as well and all reunite happily together.

== Cast ==
- Ashok Kumar as Premchand Bharadwaj
- Sunil Dutt as Dr. Ravikant Sharma
- Reena Roy as Asha Bhardwaj
- Smita Patil as Dr. Anuradha
- Nazira Satchu as Dr. Najma
- Padmini as Anuradha's Mother
- Madan Puri as Anuradha's Father
- Simi Garewal as Dr. Mukherjee
- Iftekhar as Tata Hospital Head
- Khushbu as Ravikant & Asha's Teenage Daughter
- Sunder as Laundryman
- Johnny Lever as Joseph
- Col Raj Kumar Kapoor as Khan Pathan Security Guard
- Yunus Parvez as John (Hospital Ward Attendant)
- Satyen Kappu as Mr. Choubey (Cook)
- Tirlok Malik as Dr. Khan
- Padmini Kolhapure as Guest
- Master Mantu Shaw as Shashi

== Reception ==
The film was a hit at the box office.Sunil Dutt made this film in honor of his wife Nargis who died in 1981 and spread awareness towards cancer.

== Music ==
1. "Kaun Hoon Main, Kya Naam Hai Mera" - Lata Mangeshkar
2. "Baap Ki Jagah Maa Le Sakati Hai" - Kishore Kumar
3. "Ganapati Bappa Moraya" - Hariharan
4. "Mere Man Mandir Ka" - Chandrashekhar Gadgil
5. "Yun Nind Se Vo Jaan-E-Chaman, Jaaga Uthi Hai" - Kishore Kumar
6. "Love Is Many A Splendoured Thing" - Usha Uthup
7. "Baap Ki Jagah Maa Le Sakati Hai (Slow)" - Kishore Kumar

The song "Yun Nind Se Vo Jaan-E-Chaman" is set in raga Shyam Kalyan.
