= Yaadein (1964 film) =

- Directed by: Sunil Dutt
- Written by: Akhtar ul-Iman
- Produced by: Sunil Dutt
- Starring: Sunil Dutt; Nargis Dutt
- Cinematography: S. Ramachandra
- Music by: Vasant Desai
- Release date: 1964
- Running time: 113 minutes
- Country: India
- Language: Hindi

Yaadein (English: Memories) is a 1964 black and white Hindi film directed and produced by Sunil Dutt who also stars in the film as the only actor to appear onscreen in the entire film. The only other actor in the film is Dutt's wife Nargis Dutt who only appears as a silhouette in the final scene.

Dutt conceptualized this black and white film art experiment with the use of imaginary expressions. He also introduced another form of visual expression in this film, the silhouette, in which a black shadow is used to depict a distinct personality. The film is considered a unique film that was ahead of its time.

This film is the world's first as well as first Indian film in cinema to feature only a single actor and has earned an entry in the Guinness Book of World Records in the category Fewest actors in a narrative film. The French film La Dernière Lettre (2002) is the second and the Kannada film Shanti (2005) is the third in cinema history to feature only a single actor throughout the entire movie. Dutt won National Film Award for Best Feature Film in Hindi for his performance and direction.

Film narrative progresses through dialogues and background music composed by Vasant Desai, who also gave two songs sung by Lata Mangeshkar.

== Overview ==
The film is soliloquy of a man who comes home to find that his wife and children are not at home, he assumes that they have left him and reminiscences his life with them, and scared of his life without them, he regrets his past indiscretions.

== Music ==
1. "Radha Tu Hai Diwani" - Lata Mangeshkar
2. "Dekha Hai Sapna Koi" - Lata Mangeshkar

== Cast ==
- Sunil Dutt - Anil
- Nargis Dutt - Priya, Anil's wife (as a silhouette)

== Production ==
Dutt got the idea for Yaadein when his wife Nargis travelled to Czechoslovakia as a jury member at a film festival and took their children with her. Left alone at home, he experienced the emptiness of the house, which inspired him to make a story about a man who comes back from work to find that his wife has left him and taken the children.

== Reception ==
The film did not do well at the box office but garnered international recognition. Dutt's performance and his experimental direction were highly appreciated. Samira Sood of ThePrint described the film as a "risky move" for any filmmaker, particularly for Dutt, who was known mainly as an actor and had only worked in production before. She regarded it as one of the boldest and most experimental films in the history of Hindi cinema. In 2017, film critics drew comparisons between Dutt's role in Yaadein and Rajkummar Rao's role in Trapped (2016), noting that both films explore psychological isolation and human endurance in confined settings.

== Awards ==
- 1964: National Awards
  - National Film Award for Best Feature Film in Hindi - Sunil Dutt
- 1966: Filmfare Award
  - Best Cinematographer: S. Ramachandra (B&W category)
  - Best Sound: Essa M. Suratwala
