= Khurd, Pakistan =

Village in Jhelum District, Punjab, Pakistan

Khurd خُورد
- Village
- Location within Punjab, Pakistan Khurd (Pakistan)
- Coordinates: 32°48′31.1322″N 73°34′25.9248″E
- Country: Pakistan
- Province: Punjab
- District: Jhelum
- Tehsil: Jhelum
- Union Council: Chotala
- Post Office: Chotala

Government
  - Type: Union Council
- Elevation: 257 m (843 ft)

Population (2017)
  - Total: 8,129
  - Estimate (2023): 9,069
- Time zone: UTC+5 (PKT)

Khurd (Urdu: خُورد), is a village in the Jhelum District of Punjab, Pakistan.

It is a part of the Chotala union council within Jhelum Tehsil, located 18.19 kilometers southwest of Jhelum city and 56 kilometers northeast of Pind Dadan Khan.

== Etymology ==
Khurd is a term derived from the Persian language meaning small. In both India and Pakistan, Khurd serves as an administrative designation indicating the smaller segment of a town, village, or settlement, usually added after place names. Nevertheless, in this particular case, Khurd functions independently as the village's name.

== Geography ==
Khurd is situated in the central region of Jhelum Tehsil, nestled in the plains between the Jhelum River and the Salt Range.

== Demographics ==
Historical population
Census	Pop.	Time span (yrs)	%±	Annual RoG %±
1951	1,950	—	—	—
1961	2,376	10	21.85%	2%
1972	3,778	11	59.01%	4.31%
1981	3,885	9	2.83%	.31%
1998	5,751	17	48.03%	2.33%
2017	8,129	19	41.35%	1.84%
2023 (est)	9,069	6	11.56%	1.84%

== Notable people ==
This village is the birthplace of Indian actor and politician Sunil Dutt, husband of notable Indian actress Nargis.
