= Kismet Ka Khel =

- Directed by: Kishore Sahu
- Written by: Kishore Sahu (story & screenplay); Ramesh Gupta (dialogues); Hasrat Jaipuri (lyrics); Shailendra (lyrics)
- Produced by: Kishore Sahu
- Starring: Vyjayantimala; Sunil Dutt; Begum Para; Jagdeep
- Cinematography: K. H. Kapadia
- Edited by: Kantilal B. Shukla
- Music by: Shankar Jaikishan
- Production company: Sahu Films Ltd.
- Release date: 1956
- Country: India
- Language: Hindi

Kismet Ka Khel (transl. Fate's Game) is a 1956 Indian Hindi-language social crime drama film, produced and directed by Kishore Sahu who also wrote the story and screenplay under his banner Sahu Films Ltd.. The dialogues were written by Ramesh Gupta. The music was composed by Shankar Jaikishan, while the lyricists were Shailendra and Hasrat Jaipuri. The main actress was Vyjayantimala, while Sunil Dutt played the hero, with his acting being commended in the film. The ensemble cast included Begum Para, Yashodhara Katju, Mukri, Kamaljeet, Jagdeep, Bhudo Advani, Tun Tun and Moni Chatterjee.

On the run from the police for a murder he has not committed, Prakash meets a slum-dwelling girl, Anokhi, and her motley group of friends. According to the Thought journal, there was nothing new in the thematic approach to the story.

== Plot ==
Prakash Verma (Sunil Dutt), a young graduate is a fugitive hounded by the police. He is suspected of murdering Seth Maganbhai Mehta, a multi-millionaire of Bombay. Scared and hungry, Prakash walks through the dark, deserted streets of the city, seeking food and shelter. Mad with hunger, he steels into a bakery and tumbles against Anokhi (Vyjayanthimala). Anokhi is a vivacious and wild girl from the slums. She employs strange means to earn her livelihood. In her moral code begging, borrowing, and even stealing are not prohibited the hungry have no scruples and the poor have no caste.

Anokhi brings Prakash to her abode a rickety and abandoned godown near the back-yards where live a number of other queer but interesting specimens of humanity. Prakash calls this bunch of beggars, pickpockets, and loafers "gutter-snipes" but soon begins to like them for the several other redeeming qualities they possess. In the abode of these degraded characters, Prakash finds food and shelter and stays on with them. Prakash revolts against the profanity of their life and soon succeeds in making them give up their bad habits and wrong pursuits. Anokhi resents his homily at first but gives in to him at last. This conflict between the two brings them close together and then the inevitable happens, they fall in love with each other.

The Police have announced a reward to the informer of the absconder Prakash, Anokhi discovers quite accidentally that Prakash, whom she has given shelter as well as her heart, is a murderer. She rates him for not taking her into his confidence. He assures Anokhi that he is not guilty of the murder and has nothing to do with it. Anokhi, in love, finds it easy to believe him. She and her companions decide to help Prakash out of the trouble by solving the mystery of the murder of Seth Maganbhai Mehta. But in the meanwhile, as fate would have it, Prakash is betrayed by a companion and is arrested by the police. Anokhi takes the job of a dancer at the cabaret and lures Sudhakar, the young manager of the late Seth Maganbhai Mehta, with her charms. Sudhakar stupefied by her charms and intoxicated with liquor, gives Anokhi the clue of Maganbhais murder. Maganbhai's daughter, Kusum, and the police arrive on the scene and arrest the real culprit. Prakash is released. He walks out of the police lock-up to the greeting crowd of his friends from the slums-and into the open arms of his beloved Anokhi.

== Cast ==
- Vyjayantimala as Anokhi
- Sunil Dutt as Prakash Verma
- Begum Para
- Yashodhra Katju
- Kanchanamala
- Mukri
- Kamaljeet
- Jagdeep
- Bhudo Advani
- Uma Devi (Tun Tun)
- Moni Chatterjee

== Crew ==
The crew consisted of:

- Producer: Kishore Sahu
- Director: Kishore Sahu
- Production Company: Sahu Films Ltd.
- Music: Shankar Jaikishan
- Lyricists: Shailendra and Hasrat Jaipuri
- DOP: K. H. Kapadia
- Editing: Kantilal B. Shukla
- Art direction: V. Jadhavrao
- Settings: John Miranda
- Assistant director: Vijay Sahu, Bir Virdi
- Make-up: J. K. Jain
- Audiographer: Kale

== Soundtrack ==
Shankar Jaikishan were the music directors and the lyrics were written by Shailendra and Hasrat Jaipuri. The playback singing was given by Manna Dey, Lata Mangeshkar and Asha Bhosle.

=== Songlist ===
Title	Singer	Lyricist
"Keh Do Ji Keh Do"	Lata Mangeshkar, Manna Dey	Hasrat Jaipuri
"Ae Zamin Ae Aasman Itna Bata"	Lata Mangeshkar	Hasrat Jaipuri
"Arz Hai Aap Se"	Lata Mangeshkar	Shailendra
"Kismat Ka Khel Hai Janaabe Aali"	Lata Mangeshkar	Shailendra
"Na Bure Na Bhale Hum Garib Gham Ke Pale"	Lata Mangeshkar	Shailendra
"Tu Maane Ya Na Maane Balam Anjaane"	Lata Mangeshkar	Shailendra
"Chalo Le Chaloon Main Taron Mein"	Asha Bhosle	Shailendra
