= Mehmaan (film) =

1973 film by Kotayya Pratyagatma

- Directed by: Kotayya Pratyagatma
- Starring: Biswajeet; Rekha
- Music by: Ravi
- Release date: 1973
- Country: India
- Language: Hindi

Mehmaan is a 1973 Bollywood crime film directed by Kotayya Pratyagatma. The film stars Biswajeet and Rekha in lead roles.

== Cast ==
- Biswajeet as Rajesh
- Rekha as Sheela
- Helen as Kitty
- Leela Chitnis as Rajesh's mother
- Manmohan Krishna as Manmohan / Vijay Singh
- Mukri as Bellboy
- Anwar Hussain as Anwar
- Tarun Bose as Tarun
- Joginder Shelly as Sinha
- Sulochana as Santosh

== Plot ==
Police Inspector Rajesh's father, also a police inspector, is killed while on duty. Rajesh swears that he will continue to do his duty, and bring the assailants to justice. Out of the four assailants responsible, he is able to apprehend three of them, but the fourth one, namely Manmohan is elusive. Manmohan learns of the imprisonment of his colleagues, and arranges for them to dramatically escape from prison. Rajesh, in plain clothes, soon tracks them down in a manor run by Santosh, whose husband is none other than Manmohan. Rajesh loves Sheela, who is the niece of Santosh. Sheela has a mute sister, Meera. One day Meera is molested and the evidence points at Rajesh.

== Soundtrack ==
All songs were composed by Ravi and penned by Sahir Ludhianvi.

1. "Chhod Are Jaa" - Mohd Rafi & Asha Bhosle
2. "Hai Uff Yeh Jawani" - Mohd Rafi
3. "Khule Gagan Ke Neeche" - Minoo Purushottam
4. "Meri Chahat Rahegi" - Mohd Rafi
5. "Raam Rahim" - Mahendra Kapoor, Minoo Purushottam and Deedar Singh Pardesi
6. "Tu Dar Maat" - Asha Bhosle
