= Sunil Dutt =

Indian film actor and politician (1929–2005)

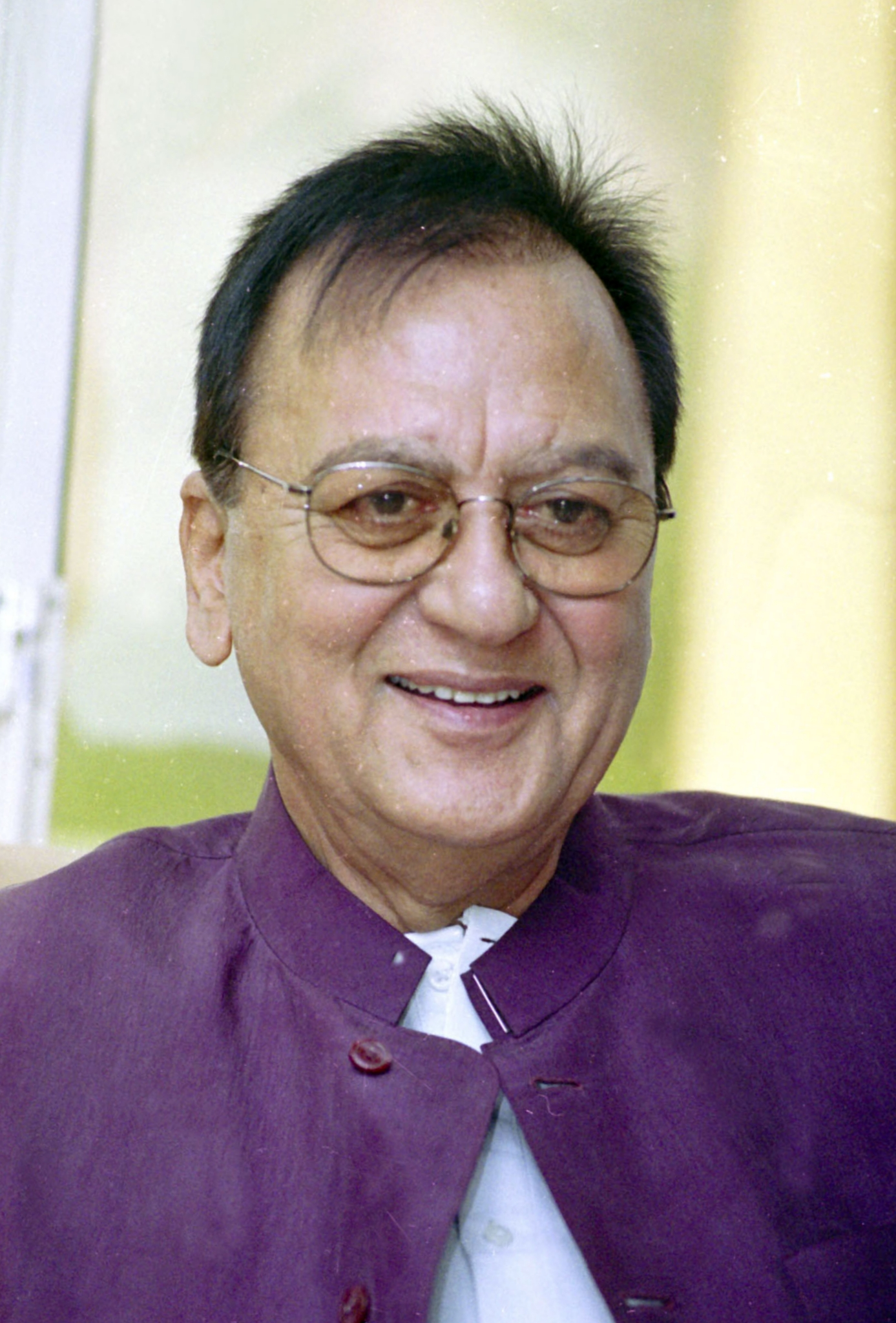
- Dutt in 2005

Union Minister of Youth Affairs and Sports
- In office 22 May 2004 – 25 May 2005
- Prime Minister: Manmohan Singh
- Preceded by: Vikram Verma
- Succeeded by: Mani Shankar Aiyar

Member of Parliament, Lok Sabha
- In office 6 October 1999 – 25 May 2005
- Preceded by: Madhukar Sarpotdar
- Succeeded by: Priya Dutt
- Constituency: Mumbai North West, Maharashtra
- In office 31 December 1984 – 16 May 1996
- Preceded by: Ram Jethmalani
- Succeeded by: Madhukar Sarpotdar
- Constituency: Mumbai North West, Maharashtra

Personal details
- Born: Balraj Raghunath Dutt; 6 June 1929 Khurd, Punjab, British India (now in Punjab, Pakistan)
- Died: 25 May 2005 (aged 75) Mumbai, Maharashtra, India
- Cause of death: Heart attack
- Party: Indian National Congress
- Spouse: Nargis Dutt (m. 1958; died 1981)
- Children: 3, including Sanjay Dutt and Priya Dutt
- Relatives: See Dutt family
- Education: Jai Hind College
- Occupation: Actor; producer; director; politician
- Awards: Padma Shri (1968)

Balraj Raghunath Dutt (6 June 1929 – 25 May 2005), publicly known as Sunil Dutt, was an Indian actor, film producer, director, and politician known for his work in Hindi cinema. He acted in more than 80 films over a career spanning five decades and was the recipient of three Filmfare Awards, including two for Best Actor. Regarded as one of the most successful and finest actors in the history of Indian cinema, Dutt was known for his unique style and delivering impactful messages through his films. In 1968, the Government of India honoured him with the Padma Shri, India's fourth highest civilian award, for his contribution to Indian cinema.

Dutt made his film debut in 1955 with the Hindi film Railway Platform. He rose to prominence with the highly successful films: Ek Hi Raasta (1956) and Mother India (1957), and consistently starred in several top–grossing Indian films from the late-1950s to the 1970s, such as Sadhna, Sujata, Gumrah, Waqt, Khandan, Mera Saaya, Hamraaz, Milan, Mehrban, Padosan, Heera, Zakhmee, Nagin, Daaku Aur Jawan and Jaani Dushman. Some of his acclaimed performances include Insān Jaag Utha, Chhaya, Mujhe Jeene Do, Nartaki, Yaadein, Gaban, Chirag, Darpan, Reshma Aur Shera, 36 Ghante, Muqabla and Dard Ka Rishta. Beginning in the early 1980s, Dutt featured in supporting roles in notable films such as Shaan, Badle Ki Aag, Kala Dhanda Goray Log, Watan Ke Rakhwale, Kurbaan and Munna Bhai M.B.B.S (his final film).

In 1995, he was honoured with the Filmfare Lifetime Achievement Award for his five decades of contribution to the film industry.

In 1958, Dutt married his Mother India co-star Nargis. Together, they had three children, including actor Sanjay Dutt. In 1984, he joined the Indian National Congress and was elected to Parliament of India for five terms, representing the constituency of Mumbai North West. Dutt served as the Minister for Youth Affairs and Sports in the Manmohan Singh government (2004–2005) and as Sheriff of Mumbai.

== Early life ==
Sunil Dutt was born on 6 June 1929 in Nakka Khurd, a village in the Jhelum District of the Punjab Province of British India (now in Punjab, Pakistan), to Punjabi Hindu parents. His birth name was Balraj Dutt, and he was born to father Diwan Raghunath Dutt and mother Kulwanti Devi Dutt. Dutt's family belonged to the Hussaini Brahmin caste of landlords. He had a younger brother, Som Dutt, and a younger sister, Raj Rani Bali.

Dutt's father died when he was five years old. Dutt was 18, when the Partition of India took place, and it began inciting Hindu-Muslim violence across the country. A Muslim friend of Dutt's father named Yakub saved their entire family, and helped them safely relocate to India. The family resettled in the small village of Mandauli on the bank of the river Yamuna, located in the Yamunanagar District of East Punjab (now in Haryana).

Dutt later moved to the Aminabad Bazaar neighbourhood of Lucknow in the United Provinces (now in Uttar Pradesh) along with his mother for some time before college. He then moved to Bombay, where he attended the Jai Hind College of the University of Bombay, and took up a job at the BEST Transportation Engineering division. He graduated with a Bachelor of Arts (Hons.) degree in History in 1954.

== Film career ==
=== Early career and rise to stardom (1955–1957) ===
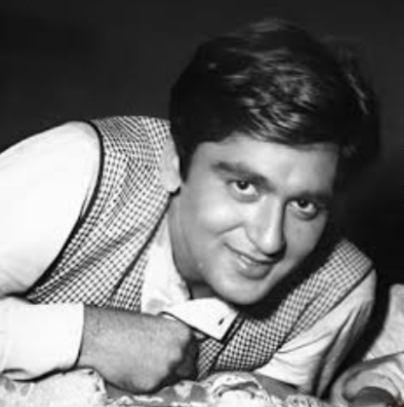
Dutt on the sets of Ek Hi Raasta (1956)

Director Ramesh Saigal played a key role in introducing Dutt, who was hosting the radio show Lipton Ki Mehfil on Radio Ceylon, to the film industry by casting him in Railway Platform (1955). Saigal met Dutt in 1953, while Dutt was reporting on the film Shikast. Impressed by Dutt's voice and personality, Saigal offered him a role in an upcoming project. Dutt declined the offer as he had promised his mother that he would first complete his education. After graduating, he acted in Saigal's film. To avoid confusion with the established actor Balraj Sahni, Saigal suggested that he adopt a new screen name and gave him the name "Sunil Dutt".

He shot to stardom with B. R. Chopra's family drama Ek Hi Raasta (1956) opposite Meena Kumari and Mehboob Khan's epic drama Mother India (1957) opposite Nargis. While Ek Hi Raasta was a major commercial success, Mother India emerged as a blockbuster and became the highest-grossing film of 1957. Although Dutt was relatively new to the industry at the time, he took on the challenging role of Birju, the rebellious son of Radha (Nargis). His performance earned widespread critical recognition, and the character has been considered Bollywood's first anti-hero. While reviewing Mother India, Shaikh Ayaz of The Indian Express found him "rogue and devilish". Mother India was also dubbed in several European languages, including Spanish, French and Russian. It went on to win several accolades and was featured in the book 1001 Movies You Must See Before You Die.

=== Widespread success, setback and resurgence (1958–1979) ===
Dutt once again collaborated with B. R. Chopra in Sadhna (1958). The film was a major box office success and went on to become a superhit. The following year, he starred in Bimal Roy's Sujata opposite Nutan and Shakti Samanta's Insan Jaag Utha opposite Madhubala. While the former was a huge commercial success, Insan Jaag Utha did moderately well. Sujata also won the National Film Award for Third Best Feature Film (Hindi). From 1960 to 1962, he starred in moderately successful films, such as Hum Hindustani in 1960, Chhaya in 1961 and Main Chup Rahungi in 1962. The year 1963 brought him into the big league with the superhits Gumrah and Mujhe Jeene Do. Along with their commercial success, both films received positive reviews from critics. In the same year, he made his debut as a producer with a legal drama Yeh Rastey Hain Pyar Ke, based on the infamous Nanavati case and later produced Mujhe Jeene Do. For his portrayal of a notorious bandit in Mujhe Jeene Do, Dutt won his first Filmfare Award for Best Actor. Madhavi Pothukuchi of ThePrint opined, "Sunil Dutt did what many other leading actors wouldn’t have done taken up a negative role at the peak of his career, and turned it into one of his best without getting stereotyped. He also chose to highlight an issue that nobody seemed to want to talk about and with that, he won the Indian audience all over again." In 1964, he directed, produced and starred in Yaadein, an experimental film with him as the sole actor. It did not performed well at the box office, but received critical praise and won National Film Award for Second Best Feature Film (Hindi) as well as an entry in Guinness Book of World Records in the category Fewest actors in a narrative film. Dutt's performance was highly appreciated by the audience. Yaadein was well received for its distinctive concept and is considered a film that was ahead of its time.

Dutt reached the peak of his success during the mid-1960s. In 1965, he featured in Yash Chopra's ensemble masala film Waqt. It opened to an excellent response from the audience and proved to be a major blockbuster as well as the highest-grossing film of the year. It is widely regarded as a cult classic. His next release was A. Bhimsingh's family drama Khandan, which became a superhit. Dutt was praised for his portrayal of a paralyzed, dedicated family man and earned his second Filmfare Award for Best Actor. In 1966, he starred in Raj Khosla's thriller film Mera Saaya opposite Sadhana and Lekh Tandon's historical drama Amrapali opposite Vyjayanthimala. While Mera Saaya was a blockbuster, Amrapali failed commercially but was critically praised. The soundtrack of Mera Saaya composed by Madan Mohan was highly successful and one of the best-selling Hindi film albums of the 1960s. Its songs, such as "Jhumka Gira Re", "Mera Saaya Saath Hoga" and "Aap Ke Pehaloon Mein", remain popular. For his performance in Mera Saaya, Dinesh Raheja commented that Dutt made an "endearing" husband and suffused his romantic scenes with warmth. In 1967, Dutt consolidated his stardom with three major commercial successes. He first starred in Adurthi Subba Rao's reincarnation drama Milan. A remake of Telugu hit Mooga Manasulu (1964), Milan was successful at the box office with its songs "Sawan Ka Mahina", "Main Toh Deewana", "Bol Gori Bol Tera Kaun Piya" and "Ram Kare Aisa Ho Jaye" topping the music charts that year. For portraying an innocent boatman in the film, Dutt was nominated for the Filmfare Award for Best Actor category and won his first BFJA Award for Best Actor (Hindi). His next release was Bhimsingh drama film Mehrban, alongside Ashok Kumar, Nutan and Mehmood, where he played a dedicated and honest man. Mehrban was also a commercially successful. He concluded the year with B. R. Chopra's suspense thriller Hamraaz which received positive reviews from critics and emerged as a blockbuster, marking Dutt's third consecutive hit of the year. Hindustan Times commended Dutt for "beautifully playing a guilt-ridden husband".

"Playing the epitome of loyalty, Sunil Dutt relied on that rare ability to project honest sentiment."

— Rediff.com on Dutt's performance in Mehrban (1967)

In 1968, he delivered another superhit in Jyoti Swaroop's musical comedy film Padosan, where he played a buffoonish lover named Bhola. Indiatimes ranked the film among the "Top 25 Must See Bollywood Films". His portrayal of Bhola, which differed from his earlier rugged roles, was lauded by critics as an "endearing" character and his comedic performance showcased his versatility. Eastern Eye reported that Padosan is widely regarded as one of Bollywood’s funniest and most entertaining films, and Dutt received appreciation for breaking his traditional heroic image by portraying "a simpleton with innocence".

The year 1969 saw the rise of Rajesh Khanna, who gained nationwide popularity with films Aradhana and Do Raaste. With his emergence, several established stars, including Dutt, faced challenges in maintaining their earlier momentum. Nevertheless, between 1969 to 1972, Dutt continued to deliver a few successful films, including Raj Khosla's Chirag (1969) and Raja Nawathe's Bhai-Bhai (1970). In the latter, he played a dual role as twins. His other films such as Reshma Aur Shera (which he also directed), Jwala, Zindagi Zindagi and Zameen Aasmaan were not commercially successful. Despite its commercial failure, Reshma Aur Shera received critical acclaim and gained cult status. Critics lauded Dutt for his performance and direction, calling it a "blood-splashed love story set in a bleak but beautiful desert" that establishes "the primacy of love and the futility of violence", as it features both gore and tragedy.

The year 1973 marked Dutt's return to the big league with Sultan Ahmed's dacoit drama Heera, which was a huge hit. The success of Heera was followed by other superhits, Pran Jaye Per Vachan Na Jaye (1974), Geeta Mera Naam (1974), Zakhmee (1975) and Umar Qaid (1975), cementing his position as a leading star of the era. By this period, Dutt had adopted a new screen persona, shifting to action-oriented and occasional negative roles.

In 1976, Dutt had two releases - Rajkumar Kohli's horror film Nagin and Raj Khosla's action drama Nehle Pe Dehla. Nagin which featured an ensemble cast, including Reena Roy, Feroz Khan, Sanjay Khan and Rekha went on to become a blockbuster at the box office. On the other hand, Nehle Pe Dehla, co-starring Saira Banu and Vinod Khanna, was also a major commercial success. The following year, he delivered two more successes with O. P. Ralhan's Paapi and Shibu Mitra's Aakhri Goli. In 1978, Dutt donned the director's hat for Daaku Aur Jawan, co-starring Vinod Khanna, Reena Roy and Leena Chandavarkar. The film opened to positive response from critics and emerged as a superhit at the box office. In the same year, he also appeared in Ram Kasam opposite Rekha and Bindiya Goswami, where he once again played dual role as twins and Kaala Aadmi opposite Saira Banu. While Ram Kasam was a commercially successful, Kaala Aadmi failed to do well. In 1979, he reunited with Rajkumar Kohli for the multi-starrer horror film Jaani Dushman, which had a bumper opening and emerged as a blockbuster as well as one of the highest-grossing films of that year. Dutt collaborated with Kohli again in the same year for Muqabla. The film featured the chartbuster song "Govinda Govinda", a duet by Mohammed Rafi and Kishore Kumar and was a hit at the box office. He concluded the year with another critical and commercial success in the action drama film Ahinsa.

=== Shift to character roles, hiatus and final works (1980–2003) ===
Dutt began the new decade with an important supporting role in Ramesh Sippy's mega-budget action crime drama Shaan (1980). The film received positive reviews from critics, but ended up as a moderately successful venture due to its high costs. In 1981, he launched his son Sanjay Dutt's career with Rocky, which became a hit at the box office. Shortly before the film's release, his wife Nargis died of pancreatic cancer. Dutt founded the Nargis Dutt Foundation in her memory for the care of cancer patients. In 1982, he appeared alongside Dharmendra and Jeetendra in Rajkumar Kohli's action thriller Badle Ki Aag, which was a box office success. The following year, he directed, produced and starred in the drama film Dard Ka Rishta, alongside Ashok Kumar, Reena Roy, Smita Patil and Khushbu Sundar. Dard Ka Rishta received positive reviews from critics and was a hit at the box office. This was followed by a setback, with only Raaj Tilak performing well commercially, while the other films such as Laila, Yaadon Ki Zanjeer and Faasle failed both critically and commercially. This changed in the late-1980s with the hit films Kala Dhanda Goray Log (1986) and Watan Ke Rakhwale (1987).

After appearing in Dharamyudh (1988), Dutt took a brief hiatus and returned to big screen in 1991 with a dowry-themed film Yeh Aag Kab Bujhegi, which marked his last directorial venture. That same year, he also starred in Kurbaan and Pratigyabadh. While Pratigyabadh and Yeh Aag Kab Bujhegi were moderate success at the box office, Kurbaan emerged as a major commercial success. Before retiring from films and choosing to focus entirely on politics, he appeared in Kshatriya, Parampara and Phool, all of which released in 1993.

Dutt returned to films once again in 2003 with Rajkumar Hirani's satirical comedy drama Munna Bhai M.B.B.S., in which he played the father of his real-life son. Munna Bhai M.B.B.S. opened to highly positive reviews from critics. It won several awards and was declared a blockbuster at the box office and achieved silver jubilee status (25 week run), making it one of only eight films to have achieved this status since the year 2000. It is considered as a classic and one of the best films ever made in the history of Indian cinema. Hindustan Times wrote that Dutt’s portrayal as the "loving yet strict" father of Munna Bhai contributed to the film’s humor. The father–son chemistry also garnered appreciation from critics as one of the most genuine and unforgettable on-screen portrayals in Bollywood. It marked Sunil Dutt's last film appearance; he died two years after its release. Rediff.com described his presence as "the most appropriate screen goodbye".

== Political career ==
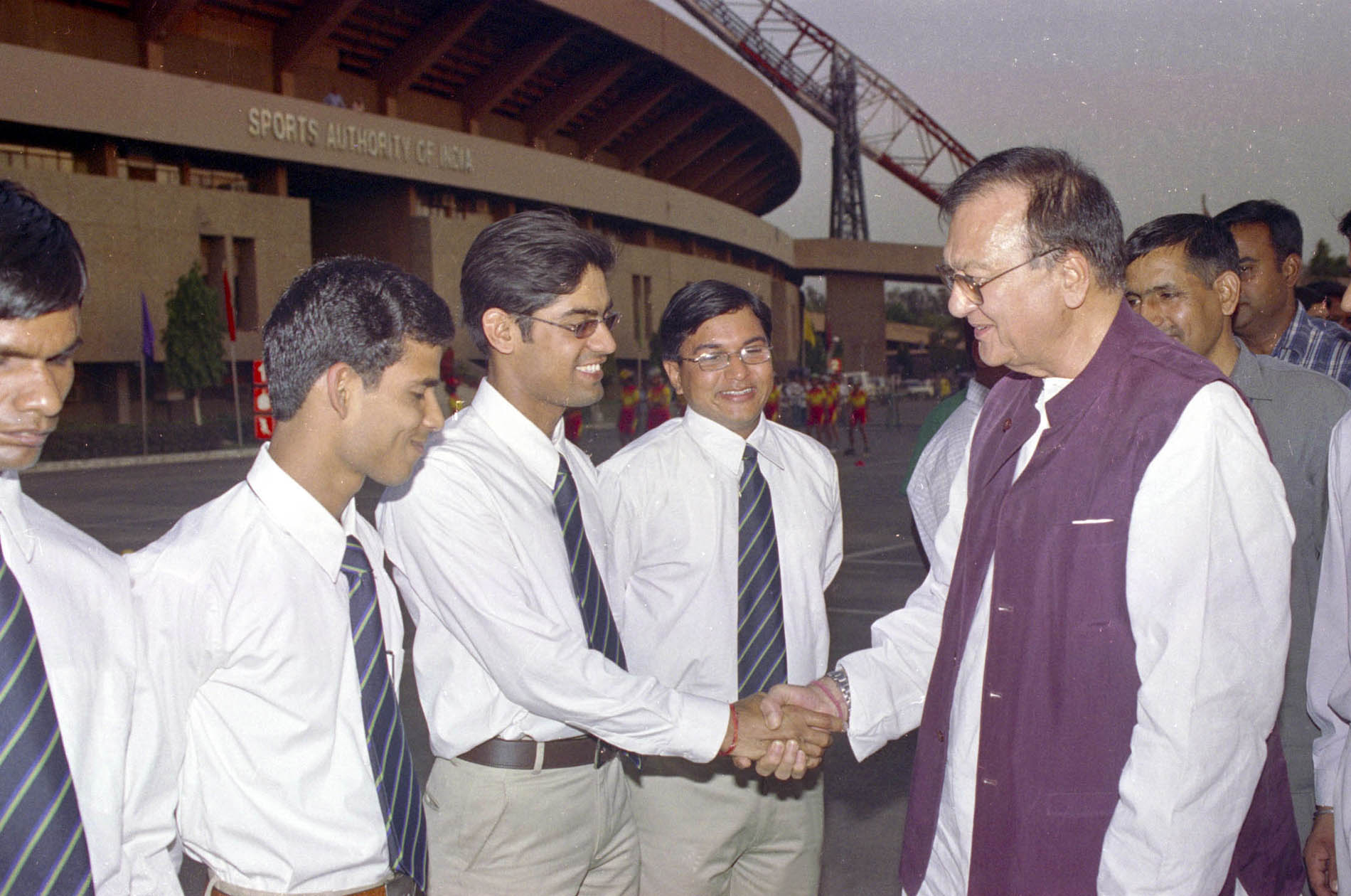
Dutt meeting the visually Impaired Cricketers of India in New Delhi on 5 May 2005

In 1982, Dutt was appointed as the Sheriff of Bombay, an apolitical titular position bestowed on him by the Government of Maharashtra for a year. He was elected as a Member of Parliament from North West Mumbai for five times (1984, 1989, 1991 [resigned in 1993 in protest over religious violence], 1999, and 2004). He worked actively for the welfare of slum dwellers, refugees and displaced people.

In 1987, when Punjab was facing heightened militancy, Dutt, accompanied by his daughter Priya, undertook a 2,000 km, 76-day-long Mahashanti Padyatra (journey on foot) from Bombay to Amritsar (Golden Temple) to promote communal harmony and brotherhood. During the padyatra, he attended more than 500 roadside meetings and suffered a bout of jaundice and blistered feet, but recovered soon. He always stressed that violence would not help any cause. Dutt later undertook a similar march while protesting against the proliferation of nuclear weapons, walking from Hiroshima to Nagasaki to demand a global ban on nuclear arms. His political career was halted for some years in the early 1990s while he worked to free his son, Sanjay, who had been arrested for possessing an AK-56 rifle, which he claimed was meant to protect his family after the bomb blasts in Bombay.

After his son's release, Dutt contested in 1999 election from the same constituency and won. He was re-elected in 2004 and became Cabinet Minister for Youth Affairs and Sports in Manmohan Singh's government. He won several national awards for his contributions to peace and communal harmony which includes the Maulana Abul Kalam Azad Award for National Integration and Communal Harmony (1997), the Khan Abdul Ghaffar Khan Award for International Peace, Communal Harmony, Unity and National Integration (1997), and the Rajiv Gandhi National Sadbhavana Award (1998).

Dutt was among the first Bollywood actors to build a successful career in politics. He earned his reputation through persistent efforts, including one of his earliest public acts—a nearly month-long peace march in Punjab during the early 1980s. At a time when the region was experiencing violent unrest due to the Sikh separatist movement, his march stood out for its courage and dedication to promoting communal harmony.

== Personal life ==
Dutt married actress Nargis, a Muslim, on 11 March 1958 in a Hindu temple. Reportedly, Dutt saved her life from a fire on the sets of Mother India. They had three children: Sanjay Dutt, Namrata Dutt, and Priya Dutt. Sanjay went on to become a successful film actor. Namrata married actor Kumar Gaurav, son of veteran actor Rajendra Kumar, who had appeared alongside Dutt and Nargis in Mother India. Priya became a politician and a Member of Parliament (Lok Sabha).

After marrying Dutt, Nargis revealed that he was the first person who treat her like a normal human being and he was always there for her in her hard times. If he hadn't come into her life, she would've ended her life. She and Dutt formed the Ajanta Arts Cultural Troupe, which involved several leading actors and singers of the time and performed at remote frontiers to entertain the Indian soldiers at border. It was the first troupe to perform in Dhaka, after the liberation war of Bangladesh in 1971.

Dutt launched his younger brother, Som Dutt, who had worked as a production assistant, in his production Man Ka Meet (1969), which also marked the debut of Vinod Khanna and Leena Chandavarkar. But Som failed to create on-screen magic and went on to act in 22 films. Eventually, he decided to move away from the film industry.

Nargis died on 3 May 1981 due to pancreatic cancer. Dutt buried her body instead of cremated as she had made it clear to him before her death that she wanted to be buried next to her late mother. One year after her death, the Nargis Dutt Memorial Cancer Foundation was established by Dutt in her memory. Later years, he worked as a tireless campaigner and raising money for the help of poor cancer patients through charities and fundraisers all across the world.

In 2001, Dutt survived an air crash. He sustained a dislocated shoulder and a fractured leg and was admitted to Breach Candy Hospital for treatment. According to reports, the small aircraft he was travelling in developed a technical issue. Dutt helped his co-passengers exit the plane to safety before escaping himself.

== Death ==
Dutt died of a heart attack in his sleep on 25 May 2005 at his residence in Bandra, West Mumbai, at age 75. He was the Minister for Youth Affairs and Sports in the Union Government led by Manmohan Singh and was the Member of Parliament from North-West Mumbai until his death. He was succeeded as Minister by Mani Shankar Aiyar. He was cremated with full state honours at the Santa Cruz Crematorium in Mumbai. His body was draped in the Indian tri-colour and carried by the military.

After his death, his seat in the Parliament was contested by his daughter, Priya Dutt, who won it and was a Member of Parliament until May 2014. In 2005, Dutt was posthumously honoured with the Phalke Ratna Award by the Dadasaheb Phalke Academy.

Following his demise, numerous figures expressed their condolences. President APJ Abdul Kalam called Dutt "a gem of a human being". Former Prime Minister Manmohan Singh said, "A colorful and charismatic personality and a celebrity in the world of cinema, Sunil Dutt touched the millions in our country through many of his purposeful and socially relevant roles in numerous films." Lata Mangeshkar said, "He was a rare human being. People like him are difficult to find." Actress Shabana Azmi stated, "It comes as such a deep shock that Dutt Sahab is not with us. He was not only great just to those who work in the industry but also to the people of country." Congress leaders also expressed their grief, Salman Khurshid said, "In politics, people always poke fun at each other. But Sunil Dutt never did that. He was a good, clean man." Rajeev Shukla said, "He was a wonderful human being. A gentleman in politics. In his death, the polity has lost a valuable leader." Prabha Rau termed Dutt "a man of peace". Film critic Saibal Chatterjee remarked, "His demise has robbed us of a stellar personality. He sought and surmounted challenges all his life."

== Artistry and legacy ==
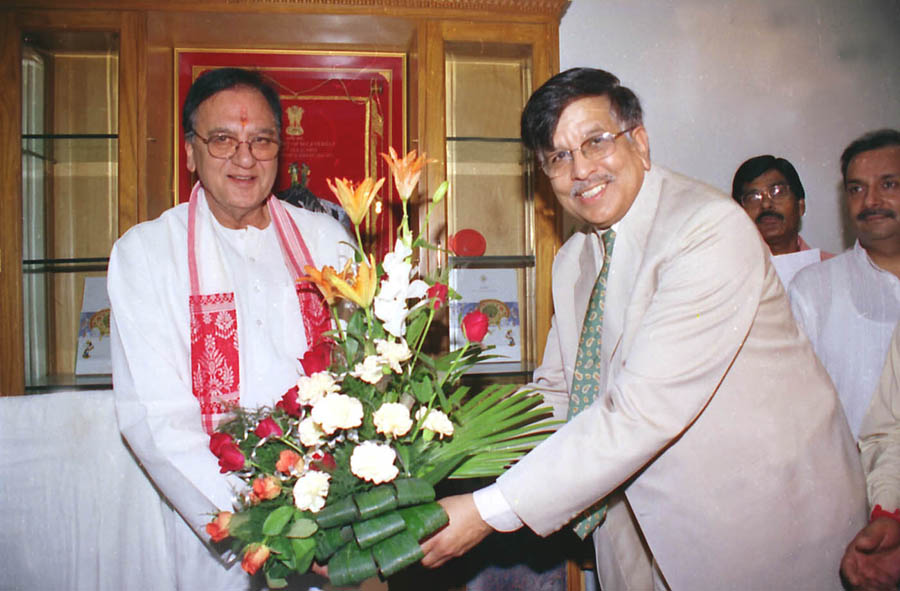
Dutt at an event in 2004

Throughout his film career, Dutt acted in a variety of genres, from romance and action thrillers to social dramas and comedies. In addition to acting, he also worked as a producer and director. His performances established him as one of the greatest actors in the industry, and he has been cited as the most handsome leading man. Recognised as a method actor and a dedicated politician, he was known for his honesty, compassion, perseverance, hard work and simplicity. Rediff.com called him "Hindi Cinema’s man of solid character", adding that "his earnest sincerity reflected entirely in all his roles, be it Birju in Mother India or Bhola in Padosan. Besides acting, he successfully made the rare transition from film to politics". Filmfare summarized his filmography as "remarkable, full of cinematic gems". Times Now placed him 2nd in its list of the "Most Good Looking Actors on Indian Screen". Dutt appeared in Box Office India's "Top Actors" list in 1966 and 1967. In 2022, he was placed in Outlook India's "75 Best Bollywood Actors" list.

Dinesh Raheja of Rediff.com noted that Sunil Dutt capitalised his ability to jump genres and expand his oeuvre at different stages of his career. His willingness to experiment with cinema led him to star in offbeat films like Padosan, Amrapali, the villain in Geeta Mera Naam and bankroll films like Yaadein (starring just one man --himself), Mujhe Jeene Do (a reformist saga) and the stark desert epic Reshma Aur Shera. Farhana Farook of Filmfare remarked, "Sunil Dutt was way beyond his films." Subhash K. Jha noted that "Dutt did not hesitate in doing women-oriented films which addressed the issues of their upliftment, empowerment and equality". He referenced some of Dutt's films in which he played a reformist, such as Sujata, Sadhna, Nartaki, Chirag, Darpan and Zindagi Zindagi. The Guardian noticed that Dutt maintained an "unpretentious style" and retained his natural accent throughout his career. Surendra Miglani from The Tribune characterised Dutt's acting style as "speaking with his eyes" and "playing every role with aplomb". He also mentioned that Dutt consciously avoided blinking while performing intense scenes, as it would dilute the ferocity of his expressions.

His films Mother India, Padosan and Munna Bhai M.B.B.S were voted among the greatest films ever made in polls conducted by News18. His directorial films received international recognition, Yaadein was selected in the Guinness Book of World Records in the category Fewest actors in a narrative film and Reshma Aur Shera was nominated for the Golden Berlin Bear at the Berlin International Film Festival. In 2022, critic Sukanya Verma included his performances in Mother India and Mujhe Jeene Do in her list of "25 Deadliest Bollywood Dacoits", noting that "he was usually mild-mannered but could display great intensity in his performances". Mid-day has described Dutt as a stalwart of Indian cinema who graced the silver screen with his remarkable talent, charisma and versatility.

Dutt was also credited with giving major breaks to then-struggling actors such as Amitabh Bachchan, Vinod Khanna, Ranjeet, Shakti Kapoor and Johnny Lever through his home productions Reshma Aur Shera, Rocky and Dard Ka Rishta respectively.

Shaikh Ayaz of The Indian Express called Dutt "a screen legend" and wrote, "His goodwill has inspired the film industry, showing what a good husband and father he was, and a man who always led from the front." Journalist V. Gangadhar stated, "Sunil Dutt was much more than an actor. With an ear to the ground and a hand on the pulse of the people, he lived by his convictions and led from the front. He never allowed personal crises to halt his main work." Director Yash Chopra said, "Whatever he did in films, it was with great dedication and from the heart; no one can reproach his sincerity. He was always ready, even for a guest role. I have never seen such a decent human being." Journalist Rauf Ahmed revealed that Dutt was always willing to help others and described him as "the man whose stardom wouldn’t dare to change, who believed in moving forward and carried no baggage from the things that did not work out in life". Jayant K. Sinha of The Economic Times acknowledged Dutt as a "man of conviction, patience, courage and character". He further wrote, "Dutt survived many personal tragedies. Despite being a doughty politician and celebrity, he was humble and ready to fight for justice." Reader’s Digest described Dutt as a "rare individual" who balanced stardom with selfless public service, highlighting his humanitarian values and political integrity. Actor Akshay Kumar's hairstyle in Action Replayy (2010) was inspired by Dutt's long-haired look in Zakhmee (1975). Actor Paresh Rawal portrayed Dutt in the 2018 film Sanju and said, "I may have done some good deeds in my past life that I got to play a noble person like Mr Sunil Dutt."

== Accolades ==
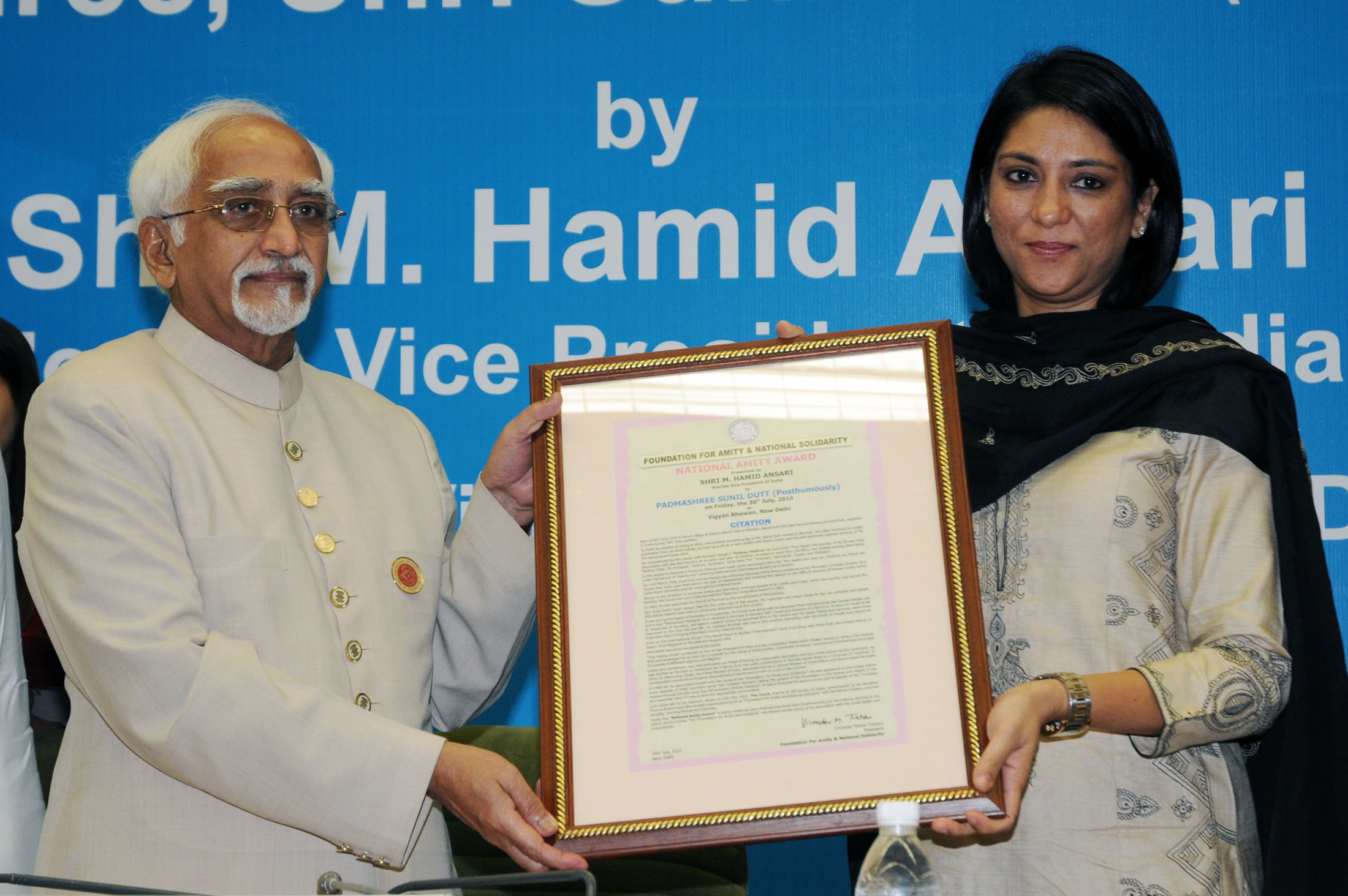
Priya Dutt receiving National Amity Award (posthumously) for Sunil Dutt on 30 July 2010

- 1964 – Filmfare Award for Best Actor for Mujhe Jeene Do
- 1964 – National Film Award for Best Feature Film in Hindi for Yaadein
- 1966 – Filmfare Award for Best Actor for Khandan
- 1968 – BFJA Award for Best Actor (Hindi) for Milan
- 1968 – Padma Shri
- 1995 – Filmfare Lifetime Achievement Award
- 1998 – Rajiv Gandhi National Sadbhavana Award
- 1999 – Screen Lifetime Achievement Award
- 2000 – Anandalok Awards Lifetime Achievement Award
- 2001 – Zee Cine Award for Lifetime Achievement
- 2005 – Glory of India Award by IIFS, London
- 2005 – Phalke Ratna Award by Dadasaheb Phalke Academy (posthumously)

== Honours and tributes ==
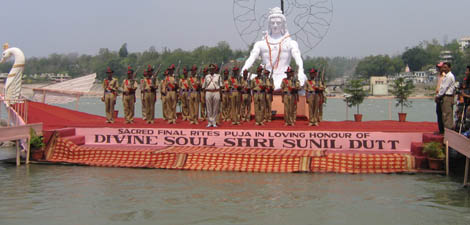
The Police of Uttranchal perform the Salami Shasta for Sunil Dutt during his final rites

Dutt had expressed during his lifetime that he did not wish to have any postal stamps, statues, roads, or organisations made in his honour. He wanted to be remembered for his work. In accordance with his wishes, nothing has been built or named after him. However, his autograph has been preserved at Bollywood Walk of Fame at Bandra Bandstand. In 2005, an event was organised at a film festival to honour Dutt's life and contributions. In 2010, a commemorative postage stamp of Dutt was issued by Indian Motion Picture Producers Association (IMPPA).

Paying tribute to him, his co-actresses such as Vyjayanthimala said, "He was a true gentleman, a progressive man and a rational artiste." Asha Parekh said, "Dutt Saab was God’s child. He was a saint in the truest sense of the word. We did Chirag together where I had played a blind girl. He was so supportive and gentle." Mala Sinha said, "Sunil Dutt was so warm and respectful. He was so punctual during the shootings and he always had kind words for everyone on the sets." Amitabh Bachchan praised Dutt's performance in Mother India and acknowledged him as Bollywood's first 'Angry Young Man'. Singer Mahendra Kapoor, who had sung several songs for Dutt's films, particularly Gumrah, Waqt and Hamraaz, said, "He was always very happy, full of good spirits and always forward-looking. His spirit was so strong that it carried him and all of us along with him."

In 2019, Nivedita Mishra of Hindustan Times described Dutt as "a gentleman actor with Gandhian values". She also highlighted his humility, simplicity and commitment to public service. In the same year, Sanjay Dutt dedicated his first Marathi film production, Baba, to his father. In 2022, ShemarooMe gave tribute to Dutt through the shows Screen Legends and The Thorough Gentleman. In 2023, CNN-News18 referred to Dutt as a "dazzling actor" and highlighted his "most memorable movie roles". On his 95th birth anniversary, Radio City published a tribute article, stating, "With a career spanning five decades, Sunil Dutt left an indelible mark on Bollywood with his powerful performances and enduring charm. He explored various genres, showcasing his versatility as an actor. But his life story goes beyond the glitz and glamour, revealing a man who battled personal struggles and emerged stronger, solidifying his position as a true legend."

== In popular culture ==
- In 2007, Dutt's daughters Priya and Namrata published a book about the lives of their parents, titled, Mr. and Mrs. Dutt: Memories of our Parents. Also that year, Darlingji: The True Love Story of Nargis and Sunil Dutt was released by Kishwar Desai.
- In 2012, Sanjay Dutt recreated his father's look from Mujhe Jeene Do (1963) for the film Son of Sardaar.
- In 2018, Paresh Rawal played Sunil Dutt, in his son's biopic Sanju. The film is ranked as one of the highest grossing Indian films of 2018.

== Filmography ==
Year	Film	Role	Notes
1955	Railway Platform	Ram	Debut film
1955	Kundan	Amrit Rai	
1956	Ek Hi Rasta	Amar	
1956	Rajdhani	Dilip Singh	
1956	Kismet Ka Khel	Prakash Verma	
1957	Payal	Mohan	
1957	Mother India	Birju	
1958	Sadhna	Professor Mohan	
1958	Post Box 999	Vikas	
1959	Sujata	Adhir	
1959	Insan Jaag Utha	Ranjeet	
1959	Didi	Gopal	
1960	Usne Kaha Tha	Nandu	
1960	Hum Hindustani	Sukendra Nath (Suken)	
1960	Ek Phool Char Kante	Sanjeev	
1960	Duniya Jhukti Hai	Mohan / Bankelal	
1961	Chhaya	Arun / Poet Rahi	
1962	Main Chup Rahungi	Kamal Kumar	
1962	Jhoola	Dr. Arun	
1963	Gumrah	Rajendra	
1963	Aaj Aur Kal	Dr. Sanjay	
1963	Yeh Rastey Hain Pyar Ke	Anil Sahni	Also producer
1963	Nartakee	Professor Nirmal Kumar	
1963	Mujhe Jeene Do	Thakur Jarnail Singh	Also producer, Won - Filmfare Award for Best Actor
1964	Yaadein	Anil	Also director and producer
1964	Gazal	Ejaz	
1964	Beti Bete	Ramu / Krishna	
1965	Waqt	Bablu / Advocate Ravi Khanna	
1965	Khandan	Govind Shankar Lal	Won - Filmfare Award for Best Actor
1966	Mera Saaya	Thakur Rakesh Singh	
1966	Gaban	Ramanath	
1966	Amrapali	Magadh Samrat Ajatashatru	
1966	Maitighar	Himself	Guest appearance
1967	Milan	Gopinath (Gopi)	Won - BFJA Award for Best Actor (Hindi) Nominated - Filmfare Award for Best Actor
1967	Hamraaz	Kumar	
1967	Mehrban	Kanhaiya	
1968	Padosan	Bhola	
1968	Sadhu Aur Shaitaan	Catholic Priest D'souza	Cameo (Uncredited)
1968	Gauri	Sunil	
1969	Pyasi Sham	Raja	
1969	Bhai Bahen	Surendra Pratap	
1969	Chirag	Ajay Singh	
1969	Meri Bhabhi	Raju	
1970	Darpan	Balraj Dutt	
1970	Bhai-Bhai	Deep / Ashok (Sangram) (Note: Dutt played two characters.)	Double role
1971	Reshma Aur Shera	Shera	Also director and producer
1971	Jwala	Ajit	
1972	Zindagi Zindagi	Dr. Sunil	
1972	Zameen Aasmaan	Ravi	
1972	Jai Jwala	Major Anand	Special appearance
1973	Man Jeete Jag Jeet	Baghel Singh / Bagga Daku	Punjabi film
1973	Heera	Heera	
1974	Kora Badan	Unnamed Dacoit	Cameo
1974	Geeta Mera Naam	Suraj / Johnny	
1974	Pran Jaye Par Vachan Na Jaye	Raja Thakur	
1974	Dukh Bhanjan Tera Naam	Sadhu	Punjabi film; Cameo
1974	36 Ghante	Himmat Singh	
1975	Zakhmee	Anand	
1975	Umar Qaid	Raja	
1975	Neelima	Unnamed Advocate	Cameo
1975	Himalay Se Ooncha	Vijay	
1976	Nagin	Vijay	
1976	Nehle Pe Dehla	Sunil / Ram	Also producer
1977	Darinda	Krishna / Yogidutt	
1977	Paapi	Inspector Raj Kumar	
1977	Sat Sri Akal	Hari Singh	Punjabi film
1977	Charandas	Advocate Tandon	Cameo
1977	Aakhri Goli	Vikram Singh / Sher Singh	
1978	Ram Kasam	Bhola / Shankar	Double role
1978	Kaala Aadmi	Birju	
1978	Daaku Aur Jawan	Birju	Also director
1979	Muqabla	Vinod / Vikram (Vicky)	
1979	Jaani Dushman	Lakhan	
1979	Ahinsa	Birju	
1979	Salaam Memsaab	Naresh Sarit	Cameo
1980	Lahu Pukarega	Satyajit / Jitu	
1980	Shaan	DSP Shiv Kumar	Special appearance
1980	Yari Dushmani	Shankar	
1980	Ganga Aur Suraj	Inspector Ganga / Birju / Sangram (Note: Dutt played three characters.)	
1980	Ek Gunah Aur Sahi	Shankar Ramdas	
1981	Rocky	Shankar	Cameo, also director
1981	Meena Kumari Ki Amar Kahani	Himself	Documentary
1982	Badle Ki Aag	Lakhan	
1982	Dard Ka Rishta	Dr. Ravi Kant Sharma	Also director and producer
1983	Film Hi Film	Himself	Documentary
1984	Raaj Tilak	Jai Singh	
1984	Laila	Dharamraj Singh / Prithviraj Singh	Double role
1984	Yaadon Ki Zanjeer	Vijay Choudhary / Ravi	Delayed release
1985	Faasle	Vikram	
1986	Kala Dhanda Goray Log	Gauri Shankar / Michael	
1986	Mangal Dada	Mangal	Delayed release
1987	Watan Ke Rakhwale	Jailor Suraj Prakash	
1987	Raj Kapoor	Himself	Documentary
1988	Dharamyudh	Thakur Vikram Singh	
1991	Yeh Aag Kab Bujhegi	Professor Krishnanand	Also director and producer
1991	Kurbaan	Prithvi Singh	
1991	Pratigyabadh	Pascal	
1991	Hai Meri Jaan	Telegram wala	Special appearance
1992	Virodhi	Police Commissioner Jagdish Kapoor	
1993	Kshatriya	Thakur Bhavani Singh	Special appearance
1993	Parampara	Thakur Bhavani Singh	
1993	Phool	Balram Choudhary	
2003	Munna Bhai M.B.B.S.	Hari Prasad Sharma	Final film
2007	Om Shanti Om	Magadh Samrat Ajatashatru	Recreated via CGI in the song "Dhoom Tana", (archive footage)

== See also ==
- Radio Ceylon
- List of Hindi broadcasters of Radio Ceylon
