= Randhir (actor) =

Indian actor

Randhir was an Indian character actor in Hindi and Punjabi films who was active from the 1940s to the 1980s. He appeared in over 172 films.

Originally, he played side heroes or the friend of the hero. On a few occasions, he even played the hero. One of his most famous hero's friend roles was in Dil Deke Dekho (1959).

The 1960s was a period of transition. Due to his age and displacement from hero's friend roles by comedians, Randhir began to experiment with character roles. He had done such roles in the 1950s and 1940s as well. In the mid-1960s, he frequently played Maharajas in costume films.

== Early life and career ==
Randhir was born on 04 May 1918, in a Thakur Rajput family of Chauhan in the princely state of Sirmour in Punjab, his only sibling went under the name of Indra who lived in Nahan. The 1982 release Meharbaani and Khud-Daar credits Randhir as "late", implying he died before its release. The release preceding this was in 1980. The release of his last performance was Bindya Chamkegi produced by Tarun Dutt son of late Gurudutt.

Prior to working in films, Randhir worked in Delhi with All India Radio. He was an ardent sportsperson and played football for a local team called Shimla Youngs while schooling in Shimla.

Randhir began adopting the moneylender 'lala' role around the end of the 1960s. His role in Baharen Phir Bhi Aayengi (1967) may be one of his earliest in this form, but it was a rough exhibition of what was to come. He firmly put himself into the role with Do Raaste (1969). Afterwards he would be cast almost exclusively as a Lala or a similar merchant. His role in Do Chor (1972), Zanjeer (1973) is an example of this typecasting.

== Filmography ==
- Gopinath (1948) film As Randhir along with Raj Kapoor
- Posti (1950) as Ganga Ram (in Punjabi movie)
- Madhubala (1950)
- Tamasha(1952) as director
- Memsahib(1956) as Communist
- Miss Mary (1957 film) as John
- Dil Deke Dekho (1959)
- Guddi (1961) as Astrologer (in Punjabi movie)
- Baharen Phir Bhi Aayengi (1967)
- Do Raste (1969)
- Do Chor (1972) as Charan Das
- Zanjeer (1973)
- Loafer (1973)
- Heera (1973) as Makhanlal
- Premi Gangaram (1978) Punjabi Movie
- Meharbaani (1982) as bihari
- Khud-Daar (1982)
