= Duniya Ka Mela =

- Directed by: Kundan Kumar
- Starring: Sanjay Khan; Rekha
- Music by: Laxmikant–Pyarelal
- Release date: 1974
- Country: India
- Language: Hindi

Duniya Ka Mela (transl. The circus of the world, working title Apna Paraya) is a 1974 Indian Hindi-language drama film directed by Kundan Kumar. Amitabh Bachchan was the original cast in the lead but he was replaced by Sanjay Khan. This has been captured in the film "Film hi Film".

== Cast ==
- Sanjay Khan as Shyam/ Munna
- Rekha as Shyama
- Bindu as Champa
- Ranjeet as Raja/ Shyam
- Jeevan as Ghanshyam
- Mehmood as Master Badri Prasad

== Music ==
Lyrics: Anand Bakshi

Song	Singer
"Yeh Chehra, Yeh Zulfen Jadu Sa Kar Rahe Hai"	Mohammed Rafi, Lata Mangeshkar
"Koi Ajnabi Sa Woh Insan"	Lata Mangeshkar
"Jangaria Main Jangaria"	Lata Mangeshkar
"Dil Khol Ke Mainu Aaj"	Lata Mangeshkar
"Dil Todke Sadak Par"	Asha Bhosle
