= Ranjeet =

Indian actor and filmmaker (born 1941)

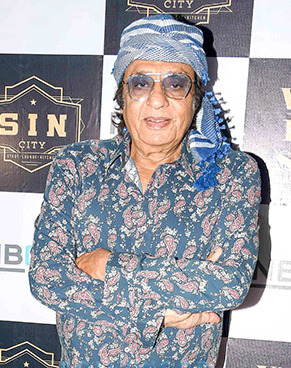
- Ranjeet in May 2019
- Born: Gopal Bedi; 13 September 1941 (age 85); Jandiala Guru, Punjab, British India
- Other name: Ranjeet Bedi
- Occupations: Actor; film producer; film director
- Years active: 1970–present
- Spouse: Nazneen (Aloka Bedi)
- Children: 2

Ranjeet (born as Gopal Bedi; 13 September 1941) is an Indian actor, film producer, and director. He has mostly played villain roles in over 200 Hindi films. He has also played a positive character in the TV series Aisa Des Hai Mera.

He has also worked in a number of Punjabi films namely Rab Ne Banayian Jodiyan, Maujaan Dubai Diyaan and Man Jeete Jag Jeet.

== Early life ==
Ranjeet was born as Gopal Bedi in Jandiala Guru, a town near Amritsar, Punjab into an orthodox Sikh family and after studying at Delhi’s Hindu College, he aimed to join the Indian Air Force before becoming an actor and entering the film industry in 1966.

== Career ==
Ranjeet shot to fame after playing a negative role in the film Sharmeelee, released in 1971. Sunil Dutt had recommended his name after liking his performance in Sawan Bhadon and Reshma Aur Shera. Ranjeet had come to Bombay to play the lead role in Zindagi Ki Rahen, which was shelved. He went ahead to establish himself as a leading villain in the 1970s and early 1980s.

Besides acting in hundreds of Hindi movies, he has also done a television serial Aisa Des Hai Mera and a couple of Punjabi films.

== Personal life ==
Ranjeet is married to Aloka Bedi (née Nazneen), niece of actress Mumtaz. They have two children: a daughter Divyanka, who is a personal trainer and founder of The Space Fitness, and a son Jeeva, who made his film debut in 2022 with Govinda Naam Mera.

== Filmography ==
- All films are in Hindi, unless otherwise noted.

=== Films ===
| Year | Film | Role | Note |
|---|---|---|---|
| 1970 | Sawan Bhadon | Damu | |
| 1971 | Sharmeelee | Kundan | |
| 1971 | Reshma Aur Shera | Gopal | |
| 1971 | Hulchul | | |
| 1971 | Haseenon Ka Devata | | |
| 1971 | Dost Aur Dushman | | |
| 1972 | Parchhaiyan | Ranjeet | |
| 1972 | Bhai Ho To Aisa | Daaku Mangal Singh | |
| 1972 | Raampur Ka Lakshman | Peter | |
| 1972 | Do Yaar | Johnny | |
| 1972 | Chori Chori | Police Inspector | |
| 1972 | Victoria No. 203 | Daaku Ranjeet | |
| 1972 | Sub Ka Saathi | Noor Ali's son | |
| 1973 | Gaddaar | Babu | |
| 1973 | Man Jeete Jag Jeet | Shera Daaku / Sher Singh | |
| 1973 | Teen Chor | | |
| 1973 | Keemat | Pedro | |
| 1973 | Rickshawala | Murli | |
| 1973 | Hifazat | Ranjeet | |
| 1973 | Kashmakash | Johnny Paul | |
| 1973 | Dhamkee | Inspector Gopal | |
| 1973 | Bandhe Hath | Ranjeet | |
| 1973 | Jheel Ke Us Paar | Balraj | |
| 1974 | Sacha Mera Roop Hai | | |
| 1974 | Pran Jaye Par Vachan Na Jaye | Bandit | |
| 1974 | Mr. Romeo | Raja Dada | |
| 1974 | Khote Sikkay | Salim | |
| 1974 | Farebi | | |
| 1974 | Pagli | Ramesh | |
| 1974 | Duniya Ka Mela | Raja / Shyam | |
| 1974 | 36 Ghante | Ajit | |
| 1974 | Aap Ki Kasam | Suresh | |
| 1974 | Imtihan | Rakesh | |
| 1974 | Amir Garib | Ranjeet | |
| 1974 | Haath Ki Safai | Ranjeet | |
| 1975 | Uljhan | Brij | |
| 1975 | Sewak | Deepak | |
| 1975 | Raftaar | Chandu Banjara | |
| 1975 | Ponga Pandit | Master | |
| 1975 | Neelima | | |
| 1975 | Himalay Se Ooncha | Ranjeet | |
| 1975 | Dhoti Lota Aur Chowpatty | Ranjeet | |
| 1975 | Aakhri Daao | Dilawar Singh | |
| 1975 | Dharmatma | Rishi | |
| 1976 | Maa | Balraj | |
| 1976 | Laila Majnu | Tabrez | |
| 1976 | Koi Jeeta Koi Haara | | |
| 1976 | Gumrah | Ranjeet | |
| 1976 | Deewangee | | |
| 1976 | Bandalbaaz | Ranjeet Gupta | |
| 1976 | Aaj Ka Mahaatma | Tony | |
| 1976 | Nagin | Good Samaritan | |
| 1976 | Bhanwar | Ravi | |
| 1977 | Zamaanat | Mangal | |
| 1977 | Kachcha Chor | Boss | |
| 1977 | Dharam Veer | Ranjeet Singh | |
| 1977 | Chor Sipahee | Sheikh Jamal | |
| 1977 | Chhailla Babu | | |
| 1977 | Chandi Sona | Sheroo | |
| 1977 | Chalta Purza | Ranjeet | |
| 1977 | Amar Akbar Anthony | Ranjeet | Guest Appearance |
| 1977 | Ab Kya Hoga | Dr. Prem Mishra | |
| 1977 | Khoon Pasina | Raghu | |
| 1978 | Phool Khile Hain Gulshan Gulshan | Bhiku Prasad | |
| 1978 | Phaansi | Tilak Singh | |
| 1978 | Parmatma | Johnny | |
| 1978 | Naya Daur | | |
| 1978 | Kaala Aadmi | | |
| 1978 | Heeralaal Pannalaal | Jaggu | |
| 1978 | Daku Aur Jawan | | |
| 1978 | Anjane Mein | | |
| 1978 | Amar Shakti | Sardar's Son | |
| 1978 | Vishwanath | Khokha | |
| 1978 | Aakhri Daku | | |
| 1978 | Phandebaaz | Jaggu | |
| 1978 | Muqaddar Ka Sikandar | J.D. | |
| 1978 | Bhookh | Ranjeet Singh "Chhote Thakur" | |
| 1979 | Salaam Memsaab | Gopal | |
| 1979 | Raakhi Ki Saugandh | Ranjeet | |
| 1979 | Muqabla | Banwari | |
| 1979 | Do Ladke Dono Kadke | Ustad | |
| 1979 | Sarkari Mehmaan | | |
| 1979 | Kartavya | Jacob | |
| 1979 | Duniya Meri Jeb Mein | Rawat | |
| 1979 | Lahu Ke Do Rang | Shankar / Devidayal | |
| 1979 | Yuvraaj | Mahendra "Siddh Purush" | |
| 1979 | Suhaag | Gopal | |
| 1979 | Ahimsa | Ramu | |
| 1980 | Takkar | Ranjeet | |
| 1980 | Swayamvar | Chandar | |
| 1980 | Aap Ke Deewane | Kundan | |
| 1980 | Aakhri Insaaf | | |
| 1980 | The Burning Train | Chandar | |
| 1980 | Lootmaar | Peter | |
| 1980 | Choron Ki Baaraat | Captain Ashok | |
| 1980 | Unees-Bees | | |
| 1980 | Chambal Ki Kasam | | |
| 1980 | Neeyat | | |
| 1981 | Ladaaku | | |
| 1981 | Jwala Daku | Jwala's Brother | |
| 1981 | Paanch Qaidi | | |
| 1981 | Humse Badhkar Kaun | Lalchand | |
| 1981 | Yaarana | Jagdish "Jaggu" | |
| 1981 | Khoon Aur Paani | Vijay Singh | |
| 1981 | Rocky | Jagdish "J.D." | |
| 1981 | Laawaris | Mahendra Singh | |
| 1981 | Hotel | Chhaganlal Patel | |
| 1981 | Fiffty Fiffty | Kumar Veerendra Singh | |
| 1981 | Meri Aawaz Suno | Ronnie | |
| 1982 | Yeh To Kamaal Ho Gaya | Chandru Singh | |
| 1982 | Raksha | Daulatram | |
| 1982 | Namak Halaal | Ranjeet Singh | |
| 1982 | Lakshmi | | |
| 1982 | Ghazab | Arjun Singh | |
| 1982 | Rajput | Jaipal Singh | |
| 1982 | Teesri Ankh | Ranjeet | |
| 1982 | Sanam Teri Kasam | Robinson | |
| 1982 | Waqt Ke Shehzade | Villain | |
| 1983 | Kalka | Chipa | |
| 1983 | Taqdeer | Ranveer Singh | |
| 1983 | Hum Se Hai Zamana | Ranjeet Singh | |
| 1983 | Dard-E-Dil | | |
| 1983 | Ganga Meri Maa | Ranjeet | |
| 1983 | Ghungroo | Veera | |
| 1983 | Achha Bura | Veer Singh / Vinay Sinha | |
| 1984 | Waqt Ki Pukar | Ganpat Rai | |
| 1984 | Pakhandee | | |
| 1984 | Sharara | | |
| 1984 | Paan Khaye Saiyan Hamaar | Thakur Harpal Singh | Bhojpuri film |
| 1984 | Sharaabi | Natwar | |
| 1984 | Shapath | Ranjeet | |
| 1984 | Qaidi | Raghu | |
| 1984 | Maqsad | Nagendra | |
| 1984 | Kanoon Meri Mutthi Mein | | |
| 1984 | Dhokhebaaz | | |
| 1984 | Aan Aur Shaan | | |
| 1984 | Inquilaab | Bhupati / Excise Minister B. Pati | |
| 1984 | Naya Kadam | Gangu | |
| 1984 | Jagir | Ranjeet Singh | |
| 1985 | Hoshiyar | Shambhu Dada | |
| 1985 | Meetha Zehar | | |
| 1985 | Sarfarosh | Satyadev | |
| 1985 | Ramkali | Pandit Hazari | |
| 1985 | Ek Se Bhale Do | Gomango | |
| 1985 | Mehak | | |
| 1985 | Maha Shaktimaan | | |
| 1985 | Geraftaar | Ranjeet Saxena | |
| 1985 | Lallu Ram | | |
| 1985 | Maa Kasam | Balwant | |
| 1986 | Krishna-Krishna | Pondrik Krishna Vasudev | |
| 1986 | Ghar Sansar | David | |
| 1986 | Ek Main Aur Ek Tu | | |
| 1986 | Aadamkhor | | |
| 1986 | Zindagani | Natwar Dada | |
| 1987 | Muqaddar Ka Faisla | Chadhha | |
| 1987 | Khazana | Tribal Leader | |
| 1987 | Imaandaar | Ramesh Sinha | |
| 1987 | Madadgaar | | |
| 1987 | Dak Bangla | | |
| 1987 | Raahee | Jaggu | |
| 1987 | Jaan Hatheli Pe | | |
| 1988 | Waqt Ki Awaz | Shera | |
| 1988 | Gunahon Ka Faisla | Dacoit | |
| 1988 | Faisla | Rana | |
| 1988 | Dharamyudh | Jaggu | |
| 1988 | Mulzim | | |
| 1988 | Sherni | Vinod Pal Singh | |
| 1988 | Marana Mrudangam | Salim Shankar | |
| 1988 | Do Waqt Ki Roti | Jagga Singh | |
| 1989 | Mohabat Ka Paigham | Raja | |
| 1989 | Meri Zabaan | Ranjeet Mehra | |
| 1989 | Hum Bhi Insaan Hain | | |
| 1989 | Aakhri Ghulam | Shera | |
| 1989 | Gair Kaanooni | Robert D'Costa | |
| 1989 | Prem Pratigyaa | Kallu Dada | |
| 1989 | Paanch Paapi | Babu Dada | |
| 1989 | Daata | Natwar Sarang | |
| 1989 | Paap Ka Ant | Shakaal | |
| 1990 | Zakhmi Zameen | Bhairav | |
| 1990 | Vidrohi | Bhoop Singh | |
| 1990 | Galiyon Kaa Badshah | Tiger | |
| 1990 | Kishen Kanhaiya | Sridhar | |
| 1990 | Karishma Kali Kaa | Dr. Ajay Ganotra | |
| 1990 | Humse Na Takrana | | |
| 1990 | Tejaa | Lal Singh | |
| 1990 | Zimmedaaar | Ranjeet Singh | |
| 1991 | Maut Ki Sazaa | Inspector Himmat Singh | |
| 1991 | Jaan Ki Kasam | Jagdish | |
| 1991 | Iraada | Tako Dada | |
| 1991 | Kurbaan | Singer | |
| 1993 | Sainik | Gajraj Chaudhary | |
| 1993 | Bhagyawan | Heera | |
| 1994 | Zaalim | Ranjeet | |
| 1994 | Aa Gale Lag Jaa | Dr. Mathur | |
| 1994 | Dulaara | Police Inspector Vijay Chauhan | |
| 1995 | Policewala Gunda | Kaalishankar "Peeli Topiwaley" | |
| 1995 | Rani Hindustani | A.K. Chopra | |
| 1995 | Oh Darling Yeh Hai India | Bidder | |
| 1995 | Karan Arjun | Mr. Saxena | |
| 1995 | Jai Vikraanta | Inspector Khote | |
| 1995 | Hulchul | | |
| 1996 | Sautela Bhai | Rehman | |
| 1996 | Aatank | Ranjeet | |
| 1996 | Maahir | Bob | |
| 1996 | Hum Hain Premi | | |
| 1997 | Shapath | Dr. Subramaniam Swami | |
| 1997 | Daadagiri | Marshal | |
| 1997 | Border | | |
| 1997 | Koyla | Dilawar | |
| 1997 | Insaaf | Inspector Lokhande | |
| 1997 | Tarazu | Police Commissioner | |
| 1998 | Aakrosh | Cyras | |
| 1999 | Aaag Hi Aag | Gopal Bharti | |
| 1999 | Bade Dilwala | Prosecuting Attorney | |
| 1999 | Rajaji | Makhanlal | |
| 2000 | Shaheed Uddham Singh: Alais Ram Mohammad Singh Azad | Gyaniji | |
| 2000 | Bulandi | Ranjeet Singh | |
| 2000 | Badla Aurat Ka | | |
| 2000 | Kaali Topi Laal Rumaal | Mogha | |
| 2001 | Dal | Micheal D'Souza | |
| 2001 | Afsana Dilwalon Ka | Hassan | |
| 2001 | Mein Hoon Pyassi Suhagan | Mumbai Police Commissioner | |
| 2001 | Kasam | Hari Singh | |
| 2001 | Aamdani Atthanni Kharcha Rupaiya | Boss | |
| 2002 | Kehtaa Hai Dil Baar Baar | Immigration Officer | |
| 2003 | Basti | | |
| 2004 | Kuch To Gadbad Hai | Chaudhry Sunil Singh | |
| 2005 | Bunty Aur Babli | Store owner | |
| 2006 | Saawan | Raj's dad | |
| 2006 | Humko Deewana Kar Gaye | Harpreet Malhotra | |
| 2006 | Dil Diya Hai | | |
| 2007 | Bombay to Goa | Colonel | |
| 2007 | Welcome | Kapoor | |
| 2008 | Yaar Meri Zindagi | Shamsher Singh | |
| 2008 | Deshdrohi | | |
| 2010 | Krantiveer: The Revolution | | |
| 2010 | No Problem | | |
| 2012 | Paanch Ghantey Mien Paanch Crore | | |
| 2012 | Housefull 2 | Dr. Ranjeet V. Asna K. Pujari | |
| 2013 | Shootout at Wadala | Bhatkar Dada | |
| 2013 | Via 70 Km | | Punjabi film |
| 2014 | Mr Joe B. Carvalho | | |
| 2015 | Welcome Back | Vikrant Kapoor | |
| 2017 | Aatankwadi | | Bhojpuri film |
| 2017 | Tiyaan | | Malayalam film |
| 2019 | Housefull 4 | Maharaja Suryadev Singh Rana / Manraj Thakral | |
| 2025 | Housefull 5 | Ranjeet Dobriyal | |

=== Director ===
| Year | Film | Note |
|---|---|---|
| 1990 | Kaarnama | |
| 1992 | Gajab Tamaasa | |

=== Producer ===
| Year | Film | Note |
|---|---|---|
| 1992 | Gajab Tamaasa | |

=== Television ===
| Year | TV Serial | Role | Note |
|---|---|---|---|
| 1994–1998 | Junoon | Sherkhan Pathan | |
| 1997 | Baat Ban Jaaye | Khanna | |
| 1999–2000 | Gul Sanobar | Veer Singh, the Commander of Hindustan | |
| 2006 | Aisa Des Hai Mera | Ranbir Singh Deol | |
| 2007 | Ghar Ek Sapnaa | Jagmohan | |
| 2008–2010 | Jugni Chali Jalandhar | Jagtaar Bhalla | |
| 2012 | Hitler Didi | Ranjeet Kukreja | |
| 2012 | R. K. Laxman Ki Duniya | Don | |
| 2013 | Tota Weds Maina | Thakur Ghamashaan | |
| 2015 | Kabhi Aise Geet Gaya Karo | Ranjeet | |
| 2016 | Bhabi Ji Ghar Par Hai! | Guest | |
| 2016 | Trideviyaan | Gamosha | |
