= M. B. Shetty =

Indian stunt and action choreographer

- Born: Muddu Babu Shetty; 1938; Mangalore, Bombay Province, British India
- Died: 23 January 1982 (aged 43–44)
- Occupations: Character actor; stunt and action choreographer; stunt coordinator
- Years active: 1956–1981
- Spouses: Vinodini; Ratna
- Children: 5, including Hriday and Rohit Shetty

Muddu Babu Shetty (1938 – 23 January 1982) simply known as, M. B. Shetty, or Shetty was an Indian film stuntman, action choreographer and actor in Hindi cinema in 1970s. He had a towering personality with a bald head, often cast as the villain brought down by heroes half his size. He was the father of director Rohit Shetty.

== Early life ==
He was born in 1938 in Mangalore, India. He arrived in Bombay from Udupi. His mother tongue was Tulu. He started as a waiter in Cotton Green after which he got into boxing and bodybuilding.

== Film career ==
He started off as a Fight Instructor in the 1956 movie Heer. He was cast as villain and composed stunts for numerous Hindi and Kannada cinema in the 1970s. He was an action director, doing over 700 films, including cult films like Don, The Great Gambler, Trishul, Deewaar and Shalimar. Shetty also starred with M.G. Ramachandran (MGR), in Navarathinam (1977) Tamil movie.

== Personal life ==
His first wife was Vinodini, with whom he had two daughters and two sons. With his second wife, Ratna, he had another son, the film director Rohit Shetty.

== Filmography ==
=== Actor ===
Year	Title	Role	Notes
1957	Tumsa Nahin Dekha	Bhola	(as Shetty)
1958	Detective		(as Shetty)
1959	Qaidi No. 911		(as Shetty)
1961	Sapera		
1961	Tel Malish Boot Polish	Kallu	(as Shetty)
1962	Gangu	Train Thief	
1962	China Town	Ching Lee	(as Shetty)
1962	Neeli Aankhen		(as Shetty)
1963	Royal Mail		(as Shetty)
1963	Phir Wohi Dil Laya Hoon	Spectator	Uncredited
1964	April Fool		(as Shetty)
1965	Tu Hi Meri Zindagi		(as Shetty)
1967	Shagird	Ruffian	(as Shetty)
1967	An Evening in Paris	Jaggu	(as Shetty)
1967	Night in London	Bald Gangster	(as Shetty)
1967	C.I.D. 909	Shetty	(as Master Shetty)
1967	Duniya Nachegi	Carvalho	
1968	Ankhen	The Guard who gets arrested with the Diamond Dealer	
1968	Haye Mera Dil	Man who gets slapped on the street	Uncredited
1969	Yakeen	Photographer	(as Shetty)
1969	Gunda		(as Shetty)
1969	Ustad 420	John	(as Shetty)
1969	Kismat	Jai	(as Shetty)
1969	Pyar Ka Mausam	Samson	Uncredited
1970	Patni		(as Shetty)
1970	Kaurav Pandav		
1970	Mangu Dada		(as Shetty)
1970	The Train		(as Shetty)
1970	Kab? Kyoon? Aur Kahan?	Foreign Arm wrestler	(as Shetty)
1970	Bhai-Bhai	Train Robber	
1970	Aag Aur Daag	Shetty	(as Shetty)
1970	Gunahon Ka Raaste	Lalu	(as Shetty)
1970	The Evil Within	Shetty	
1970	Insaan Aur Shaitan	Solanki	
1970	Inspector	Pinto	
1971	Murder in Circus		(as Shetty)
1971	Kahin Aar Kahin Paar		(as Shetty)
1971	Elaan	Boss	(as Shetty)
1971	Nadaan	Gunga Pahelwan	Uncredited
1971	Rakhwala	Shamsher Singh	Uncredited
1971	Buddha Mil Gaya	Shetty	(as Shetty)
1972	Apradh	Goon	(as Shetty)
1972	Lalkar (The Challenge)		(as Shetty)
1972	Seeta Aur Geeta	Kidnapper (Bald Guy)	(as Shetty)
1972	Victoria No. 203	Shetty	(as Shetty)
1972	Samadhi	Jr Artist	Uncredited
1972	Babul Ki Galiyan	George	
1972	Sazaa	Raaka	
1973	Gharibi Hatao		(as Shetty)
1973	Anhonee	Henchman	(as Shetty)
1973	Dhamkee		(as Shetty)
1973	Yaadon Ki Baaraat	Martin	(as Shetty)
1973	Anokhi Ada	Birju	(as Shetty)
1973	Kahani Kismat Ki	Jagga	(as Shetty)
1973	Hum Sab Chor Hain	Shankar	(as Shetty)
1973	Rani Aur Jaani	Saudagar Singh	(as Shetty)
1974	Dost		(as Shetty)
1974	Patthar Aur Payal	Heera	(as Shetty)
1974	International Crook	Jaggu	
1974	Pran Jaye Par Vachan Na Jaye	Mangal Singh's Henchman	(as Shetty)
1974	Jeevan Rekha		(as Shetty)
1974	Paise Ki Gudiya	Jaggu (Pimp)	(as Shetty)
1974	Duniya Ka Mela	Martin	(as Shetty)
1974	Badla	Pinto	(as Shetty)
1974	Goonj	Man who meets Rajesh at the station	
1975	Rafoo Chakkar	Raka	(as Shetty)
1975	Warrant		
1975	Chori Mera Kaam	Shetty	(as Shetty)
1975	Dhoti Lota Aur Chowpatty		
1975	Jaggu		
1975	Kalla Kulla	Tony	
1976	Shankar Dada	Jaggu	(as Shetty)
1976	Fakira	Raja aka Baldy	(as Shetty)
1976	Ek Se Badhkar Ek	John – J.K.'s Henchman	(as Shetty)
1976	Aaj Ka Mahaatma	Shetty	(as Shetty)
1976	Do Khiladi	Shetty	(as Shetty)
1976	Sangram	Tiger	
1976	Santo Banto	Kaalu Smuggler	(as Shetty)
1976	Harfan Maulaa		(as Shetty)
1976	Kalicharan	Shetty	(as Shetty)
1977	Immaan Dharam	Kargah	(as Shetty)
1977	Navarathinam		Tamil film
1977	Kasum Khoon Ki	Ganja Shetty	
1977	Ram Bharose	Jaggu	(as Shetty)
1977	Maha Badmaash	Alberto	(as Shetty)
1978	Rahu Ketu	Joginder	(as Shetty)
1978	Phaansi	Bheema	(as Shetty)
1978	Kasme Vaade	Bandit	Uncredited
1978	Trishul	Madhav Singh	(as Shetty)
1978	Don	Shakaal	(as Shetty)
1978	Do Musafir	Landlord	(as Shetty)
1978	Azaad	Ajit Singh's Henchman	Uncredited
1978	Anpadh	Mangal	(as Shetty)
1978	Chor Ke Ghar Chor	Shankar	(as Shetty)
1978	Shalimar	Tribal Chief	
1978	Khoon Ka Badla Khoon	Al fanzo's goon	(as Shetty)
1978	Kiladi Kittu		Kannada film
1978	Chor Ka Bhai Chor		(as Shetty)
1978	Operation Diamond Racket		Kannada film
1979	Pehredaar		
1979	The Great Gambler	Martin	Uncredited
1979	Heera-Moti	Pratap's assistant	(as Shetty)
1980	Be-Reham	Shetty	
1980	Gehrayee		(as Shetty)
1980	Kala Pani	Shetty	Uncredited
1980	Garam Khoon	Swamy	
1980	Rusthum Jodi	Tony	Kannada film
1981	Chehre Pe Chehra	Bar bouncer	
1981	Jail Yatra	Kuldeep's Henchman	(as Shetty)
1981	Ek Aur Ek Gyarah		(as Shetty)
1981	Maan Gaye Ustaad	Jaikishan's goon	(as Shetty)
1981	Simhada Mari Sainya	Dayaram	Kannada film
1982	Prohari		
1982	Vakil Babu	Man attacked Mr. Mathur	Uncredited
1982	Heeron Ka Chor		
1982	Kanya Dweep		(as Shetty)
1982	Ustadi Ustad Se	Prem's associated	(as Shetty)
1996	Jurmana		(as Shetty) (final film role)

=== Stunts ===
Year	Title	Role
1956	Heer	(fight instructor)
1958	Detective	(action coordinator – as Shetty)
1959	Ujala	(fight composer – as Shetty)
1960	Singapore	(stunt coordinator)
1961	Tel Malish Boot Polish	(stunt coordinator: fights – as Shetty)
1961	Junglee	(fight composer – as Shetty)
1961	Jab Pyar Kisise Hota Hai	(fight composer – as Shetty)
1962	China Town	(fight composer – as Shetty)
1963	Pyar Ka Bandhan	(fight composer – as Shetty)
1963	Phir Wohi Dil Laya Hoon	(action coordinator: fights – as Shetty)
1963	Holiday in Bombay	(fight composer – as Shetty)
1964	Kashmir Ki Kali	(fight composer – as Master Shetty)
1964	Ishaara	(action coordinator)
1964	April Fool	(fight composer – as Shetty)
1965	Mohabbat Isko Kahete Hain	(fight composer – as Shetty)
1965	Janwar	(fight composer – as Shetty)
1966	Teesri Manzil	(fight composer – as Shetty)
1966	Sawan Ki Ghata	(fight composer – as Master Shetty)
1966	Dada	(stunt coordinator – as Shetty)
1966	Amrapali	(stunt director: fights – as Shetty)
1967	Latt Saheb	(fight composer – as Shetty) naren
1967	An Evening in Paris	(stunt coordinator: fights – as Master Shetty)
1968	Mere Hamdam Mere Dost	(fight composer – as Shetty)
1968	Jhuk Gaya Aasman	(fight composer – as Shetty)
1968	Haye Mera Dil	(fight composer – as Shetty)
1968	Dil Aur Mohabbat	(fight composer – as Shetty)
1968	Brahmachari	(fighting instructor – as Shetty)
1969	Yakeen	(fight composer – as Shetty)
1969	Talash	(fight composer – as Shetty)
1969	Pyar Ka Mausam	(stunts: fight)
1969	Pyar Hi Pyar	(fight composer – as Master Shetty)
1969	Prince	(fight composer – as Master Shetty)
1969	Jeene Ki Raah	(fight composer – as Shetty)
1969	Ek Shrimaan Ek Shrimati	(stunt coordinator: fights – as Master Shetty)
1969	Anjaana	(stunts – as Shetty)
1970	The Evil Within	
1970	My Love	(fight composer – as Master Shetty)
1970	Kati Patang	(fight composer – as Master Shetty)
1970	Gunahon Ka Raaste	(stunt coordinator – as Master Shetty)
1970	The Train	(fights)
1971	Paraya Dhan	(fight composer – as Shetty)
1971	Jwala	(stunts – as Shetty)
1971	Caravan	(fight composer – as Master Shetty)
1971	Buddha Mil Gaya	(fight composer)
1971	Aap Aye Bahaar Ayee	(fight composer – as Shetty)
1971	Jaane-Anjaane	(fight composer – as Master Shetty)
1971	Kal Aaj Aur Kal	(fight composer – as Shetty)
1971	Nadaan	(action coordinator: thrills – as Shetty)
1972	Seeta Aur Geeta	(fighting instructor – as Shetty)
1972	Be-Imaan	(fight composer – as Shetty)
1972	Lalkar (The Challenge)	(fight composer – as Shetty)
1972	Victoria No. 203	(fights – as Shetty)
1973	Yaadon Ki Baaraat	(fight composer – as Shetty)
1973	Bada Kabutar	(stunts – as Shetty)
1973	Anokhi Ada	(fight composer – as Shetty)
1973	Anhonee	(fight composer – as Master Shetty)
1973	Daag: A Poem of Love	(fight composer)
1973	Joshila	(action coordinator: jail sequences – as Shetty)
1974	Dost	(stunt director: fights – as Shetty)
1974	Amir Garib	(fight composer – as Shetty)
1974	Patthar Aur Payal	(fights – as Shetty)
1974	Bidaai	(fights – as Shetty)
1975	Sanyasi	(fights)
1975	Deewaar	(fight composer – as Shetty)
1975	Amanush	(fight composer – as Master Shetty)
1975	Chori Mera Kaam	(fight composer – as Shetty)
1976	Aaj Ka Mahaatma	(stunt coordinator: thrills – as Shetty)
1976	Kabhi Kabhie – Love Is Life	(stunt coordinator: thrills – as Shetty)
1976	Khaan Dost	(stunt director: thrills – as Shetty)
1976	Mehbooba	(stunt director: fights)
1976	Shankar Dada	(action coordinator: fights – as Shetty)
1976	Ek Se Badhkar Ek	(fights – as Shetty)
1977	Ram Bharose	(fight composer – as Shetty)
1977	Immaan Dharam	(stunt director: fights – as Shetty)
1977	Dhoop Chhaon	(action coordinator: fights – as Shetty)
1977	Doosra Aadmi	(stunt coordinator: thrills – as Shetty)
1978	Phaansi	(stunt coordinator: thrills – as Shetty)
1978	Don	(fight composer – as Shetty, villain actor – as Shakaal)
1978	Shalimar	(stunt master)
1979	The Great Gambler	(stunt coordinator: fights – as Shetty)
1980	Bombay 405 Miles	(stunt coordinator: fights – as Shetty)
1981	Barsaat Ki Ek Raat	(action coordinator – as Shetty)
1981	Jail Yatra	(action coordinator – as Shetty)

== See also ==
- List of Indian film actors
