= Keshav =

Keshav is a South Asian male given name which is a modern form of name Keshava, one of the many names of Krishna and Vishnu. Notable people with the name include:

- Keshav Kashmiri (1410–1490), Indian philosopher
- Keshav Bansal (born 1991), Indian entrepreneur
- Keshav Vaman Bhole (1896–1967), Indian musical composer
- Keshav Kumar Budhathoki, Nepalese politician
- Keshav Dutt (1925–2021), Indian field hockey player
- Keshav Ginde (born 1942), Indian flautist
- Keshav Prasad Goenka (1912–1983), Indian businessman
- Keshav Baliram Hedgewar (1889–1940), Indian chief
- Keshav Rao Jadhav (1933–2018), Indian activist
- Keshav Rao Koratkar (1867–1932), Indian pioneer
- Keshav Kumar (born 1988), Indian cricketer
- Keshav Maharaj (1990), South African cricketer
- Keshav Prasad Mainali, Nepalese politician
- Keshav Malik (1924–2014), Indian poet
- Keshav Dev Malviya (1904–1981), Indian political leader
- Keshav Mangave (1926–1997), Indian wrestler
- Keshav Prasad Maurya (born 1969), Indian politician
- Keshav Meshram (1937–2007), Marathi poet
- Keshav R. Murugesh (born 1963), Indian executive officer
- Keshav Dattatreya Nayak, Indian scientist
- Keshav Pandit (died 1690), Sanskrit scholar and poet
- Keshav K Pingali, American computer scientist
- Keshav Jagannath Purohit (1923–2018), Marathi writer
- Keshav Roy (born 1926), Indian wrestler
- Keshav Samant, Indian bridge player
- Keshav Sathe (1928–2012), Indian tabla player
- Keshav K. Singh, American cellular biologist
- Keshav Prasad Upadhyaya (born 1944), Nepalese judge

== Surname ==
- Amrit Keshav Nayak (1877– 1907), Actor and director
- Umakant Keshav Apte (1903– 1971), First pracharaks
- Bal Keshav Thackeray (1926–2012), Indian politician who founded the Shiv Sena
- Dhondo Keshav Karve (1858–1962), Social reformer in India
- Keerthi Keshav Bhat (born 1999), Indian Actress
- Krishnaji Keshav Damle (1866–1905), Marathi poet
- Mangesh Keshav Padgaoankar (1929– 2015), Marathi poet
- Payyavula Keshav (born 1965), Member of the Legislative Assembly of the Indian
- Pralhad Keshav Atre (1898–1969), Marathi writer and poet
- Srinivasan Keshav (born 1965), American-Canadian Computer Scientist from India.
- Vijay Keshav Gokhale (born 1959), Indian diplomat and the 32nd Foreign Secretary of India.
