= Chaman Puri =

Indian character actor

- Born: Chaman Lal Puri; 2 October 1914; Rahon, Punjab, India (present-day Punjab, India)
- Died: 26 June 1998 (aged 83)
- Occupation: Actor
- Years active: 1938–1989
- Relatives: Madan Puri (brother); Amrish Puri (brother); K. L. Saigal (cousin)

Chaman Puri (2 October 1914 – 26 June 1998) was an Indian actor of Hindi and Punjabi films. His younger brothers were Bollywood actors Madan Puri and Amrish Puri.

== Early life ==
Chaman Puri was the first of five children, with younger brothers Madan Puri, Amrish Puri and Harish Lal Puri and younger sister Chandrakanta Mehra. He was the first cousin of the singer K. L. Saigal.

== Career ==
Puri is best known for Howrah Bridge, The Train (1970) and Victoria No. 203 (1972).

== Filmography ==
Year	Film	Character/Role
1989	Pyaar Ka Pahela Sawan	
1987	Aulad	Devki's dad
1987	Khazana	Shantidas
1985	Ek Chitthi Pyar Bhari	Aarti's father-in-law
1985	Pyar Jhukta Nahin	Shankar
1981	Do Posti	Chaudhary/Sarpanch
1981	Chaska	
1980	Bombay 405 Miles	Mohanlal
1980	Khwab	Dayal - Landlord
1978	Chor Ke Ghar Chor	Maina's foster father
1978	Do Musafir	Bhavani Singh
1978	Phaansi	Chaudhary
1977	Ram Bharose	
1977	Saal Solvan Chadya	
1977	Wangar	Neki Ram
1977	Mamta	Doctor
1976	Aap Beati	Kishorilal's boss
1976	Fakira	
1976	Khalifa	Chair of Sabka Bhala Party (uncredited)
1975	Mere Sajna	
1975	Awara Ladki	as a Police Commissioner
1975	Chori Mera Kaam	Shambhu (Sharmili's dad)
1974	Woh Main Nahin	Sunanda's Father
1974	Amir Garib	Baba (as Chamanpuri)
1974	Chor Machaye Shor	Mukhiya
1973	Ek Nari Do Roop	Petrol Pump Owner
1973	Ghulam Begam Badshah	
1973	Pyaar Ka Rishta	Bihari Chacha
1973	Teen Chor	
1973	Rocky Mera Naam	Diwan Kriparam
1972	Jangal Mein Mangal	Head of the Village
1972	Victoria No. 203	Rekha's father
1971	Hum Tum Aur Woh	Seth Banwari Lal
1971	Jwala	
1971	Paraya Dhan	Shewaram
1971	Sansar	Seth
1970	Insaan Aur Shaitan	Jugal Maharaj - Ratna's Daddy
1970	Aan Milo Sajna	Diwan
1970	Geet	Stage Musician
1970	The Train (as Chamaanpuri)	
1970	Sau Saal Beet Gaye	Bhagirathi's Brother
1969	Waris	James
1968	Ek Phool Ek Bhool	Prof. Gaurishanker
1967	Nai Roshni	Principal
1967	Maya (TV Series)	Mookerjee
1967	Aayega Aanewala	
1967	Naujawan	
1966	Pyar Kiye Jaa	Devraj
1966	Mamta	Ghishta Babu - Devyani's dad
1966	Chanchal Ka Sapna	
1965	Akashdeep	
1965	Bahu Beti	Dhanpat Rai
1965	Shaheed	
1964	Leader	
1964	Rahul	
1963	Deepak	
1963	Phool Bane Angaare	Vimla's dad
1962	Burmah Road	The King (uncredited)
1962	Raaz Ki Baat	Bachchan Singh
1962	Hamen Khelne Do	
1961	Hum Matwale Naujawan	
1961	Sapne Suhane	Jaggu Mama
1961	Tanhai	
1960	Masoom	School Headmaster
1960	Patang	Babu Himmatrai
1959	Commander	
1959	Hum Bhi Insaan Hain	
1959	Pardesi Dhola	
1958	Howrah Bridge	Madan
1957	Paying Guest	Public Prosecutor
1957	Talaash	
1956	Heer	Ranjha's Father
1956	26 January	
1956	Bharti	
1956	Qeemat	
1955	Abe Hayat	
1955	Jalti Nishani	
1954	Khaibar	
1954	Mahatma Kabir	
1954	Mastana	Pujari / Temple Priest
1954	Sangam	
1954	Shart	Doctor
1953	Aansoo	
1952	Jaggu	
1951	Bahar	
1951	Nadaan	
1951	Afsana	Meera's blind dad
1950	Sangram	Police Officer
1949	Raat Ki Rani	
1941 Punjabi Movie released on 29 August 1941	Pardesi Dhola	
1938	Street Singer	as Munshi also writer in theatre
