= Farah Sultan Ahmed =

Indian film producer (born 1968)

- Born: 22 October 1968 (age 58); Delhi, India
- Education: Mumbai University
- Occupation: Producer
- Years active: 2015–present
- Spouse: Sultan Ahmed (m. 1987; died 2002)
- Children: Ali Abbas Sultan Ahmed; Ali Akbar Sultan Ahmed
- Parent: Mustafa Musa

Farah Sultan Ahmed is a Bollywood film producer. She started her career by assisting her partner producer/director Sultan Ahmed from 1987 until his death in 2002.

== Career ==
Mrs. Sultan controlled all the pre-production, outlays, shooting schedule and post production for the movie Daata starring Mithun Chakraborty and Padmini Kolhapure and later the film Jai Vikraanta starring Sanjay Dutt, Zeba Bakhtiar and Amrish Puri. She directed a music album Sitaara in 2007. She was elected as the EC Member of IMPPA (Indian Motion Pictures Producers' Association) from 2002- 2008. She was a treasurer and convenor and handled many sensitive issues of the industry in IMPPA.

In 2011 she started ThinkBig Entertainment, her sister company of Sultan Production and has executed many events under the banner, and also laid the foundation of ThinkBig Entertainment in Dubai.

In 2016, she started to work on a sequel to Mughal-e-Azam, apparently using the script written by her husband.
