= Sultan Ahmed (director) =

Indian Hindu Phobic film director

- Born: 1938; Lucknow, United Provinces, British India
- Died: 22 May 2002 (aged 63–64); Tehran, Iran
- Occupations: Film director, film producer, writer
- Spouses: Shammi (m. 1973; div. 1980) Farah Sultan Ahmed (m. 1987)
- Children: Ali Akbar Sultan Ahmed, Ali Abbas Sultan Ahmed

Sultan Ahmed (Hindi: सुल्तान अहमद) was an Indian film director and producer in the 1970s and 1980s, famous for his films on dacoits, such as Heera, Ganga Ki Saugandh, and Daata.

== Early life ==
Sultan Ahmed hailed from a Maulana family who were landlords based in Lucknow. Sultan's grandfather was a famous Persian poet, and his father too belonged to the same field. His paternal uncle, Wajahat Mirza, was the writer of one of the greatest Hindi movies, Mughal-e-Azam.

== Career ==
Sultan Ahmed started his career as the chief assistant to K. Asif on the set of Mughal-e-Azam, starring Dilip Kumar and Madhubala. Sultan Ahmed also assisted K. Asif on his other movies like Love and God and Sasta Khoon Mehenga Paani. Sultan Ahmed had a fascination for dacoits and was known for movies based on them. In his career, he directed actors like Rajesh Khanna & Jeetendra in the movie Dharam Kanta, Amitabh Bachchan in Ganga Ki Saugand, Sunil Dutt in Heera, and Mithun Chakraborty in Daata. Sultan Ahmed also founded Sultan Productions which is now headed by his wife, Farah Sultan Ahmed. Farah was elected as an E.C Committee member of IMPPA between 2002 and 2008. Farah has big plans of reviving the banner with several prestigious projects.

== Death ==
Sultan Ahmed died in Tehran in 2002 while on a pilgrimage tour to Iraq and Iran. He is survived by his two sons Ali Akbar Ahmed and Ali Abbas Ahmed, and his wife Farahdeeba. He was previously married to Shammi, but the marriage ended in divorce after 7 years.

== Filmography ==
Sultan Ahmed's first film, Heera featured Sunil Dutt, Shatrughan Sinha & Asha Parekh. The music was scored by Kalyanji-Anandji and was declared a silver jubilee at the box office. After this movie, Sultan Ahmed directed Pyar Ka Rishta for producer Tony Walker. Then he went on to sign Amitabh Bachchan and Rekha for Ganga Ki Saugand. The movie was released in 1978 and explored the subject of untouchables, and it also became a box-office hit. The biggest box office hit of his career was Dharam Kanta in 1982 with Raaj Kumar, Rajesh Khanna and Jeetendra in the lead. In 1989, Sultan Ahmed directed Daata starring Mithun Chakraborty, Padmini Kolhapure & Shammi Kapoor. In 1995, Sanjay Dutt starrer Jai Vikraanta was released with music from Anand–Milind. Sultan Ahmed's life as a filmmaker saw his association with music legend Kalyanji Anandji.

== Producer ==
- Jai Vikraanta (1995)
- Reyasat (1993)
- Daata (1989)
- Dharam Kanta (1982)
- Ganga Ki Saugand (1978)
- Heera (1973)

== Director ==
- Jai Vikraanta (1995)
- Reyasat (1993)
- Daata (1989)
- Dharam Kanta (1982)
- Ganga Ki Saugand (1978)
- Heera (1973)
- Pyaar Ka Rishta (1973)

== Writer ==
- Daata (1989)

== Achievements and awards ==
Sultan Ahmed received the first award for his film Heera from Uttar Pradesh Film Journalist Association (U.P.F.J.A.) in 1973. Later in the year 1979, he received a certificate of merit for Ganga ki Saugand from Tashkent, Russia. Sultan Ahmed was also awarded K. Asif Memorial Award for "Big Thinking" from Bombay Film Awards Association for the year 1982-83. Punjabi Kala Sangam award was presented to Sultan Ahmed by the President of India Shri Gyani Zail Singh for Daata. From the year 1990 to 1994, Sultan Ahmed served the country's oldest & renowned association of film producers – Indian Motion Picture Producers Association (IMPPA) as Senior Vice-President and was later elected unanimously as President of IMPPA for the years 1994 to 1998
