= Ustadon Ke Ustad =

Ustadon Ke Ustad (lit. 'Expert of all experts') may refer to these Indian Hindi-language films:

- Ustadon Ke Ustad (1963 film)
- Ustadon Ke Ustad (1998 film)

== See also ==
- Ustaad (disambiguation)
