= Mosagallaku Mosagadu =

Mosagallaku Mosagadu (transl. gaming the system) may refer to these Indian Telugu-language films:

- Mosagallaku Mosagadu (1971 film)
- Mosagallaku Mosagadu (2015 film)

== See also ==
- Monagallaku Monagadu, a 1966 Indian Telugu-language film
- Mosagallu, a 2021 Indian Telugu-language film
