= Jwala (1971 film) =

- Theatrical release poster
- Directed by: M. V. Raman
- Written by: Original Story: Chandilyan; Dialogue: Rajinder Singh Bedi
- Produced by: M. V. Raman
- Starring: Sunil Dutt; Madhubala
- Cinematography: S. Hardip; Director of Photography:S. Hardip
- Edited by: Manohar Prabhu; M. V. Raman
- Music by: Shankar–Jaikishan; Bhansali: Associate Song Recordist
- Distributed by: Raman Productions (Madras)
- Release date: 1971
- Country: India
- Language: Hindi

Jwala (transl. Flame) is a 1971 Indian Hindi-language action film directed and produced by M. V. Raman and written by Chandliyan. It stars Madhubala (in her final, posthumous film appearance) and Sunil Dutt, with Sohrab Modi and Pran in pivotal roles. The film's music was composed by Shankar–Jaikishan.

Jwala was first conceived in 1958 but was not completed by the late 1960s. Madhubala was mostly absent from the set due to her sickness, and Raman had to make use of body doubles to finish the filming. The film failed at the box office when released in July 1971—two years after Madhubala's death—and received mixed-to-negative reviews from critics.

== Plot ==
Maharaja Anup Singh is attacked by his archenemy, the Raja of Rampur, and in the ensuing battle, Anup Singh loses his kingdom and flees for his life. He is thus separated from his infant son Ajit, who has taken refuge in the safety of the jungles with the trusted aide of Anup Singh. Whilst in this compulsory exile, Maharaja Anup Singh is befriended by Vanaraj and with his help goes from Kingdom to Kingdom to ask for help to regain his lost Kingdom. Ajit in the meanwhile grows up in wild jungles among the wild animals, not knowing that he is the son of beloved Anup Singh. The Raja of Rampur along with his daughters is travelling through the jungles when they are attacked by a band of Dacoits. Ajit, who was nearby hears the cries of their distress, comes to their aid and saves them from the Dacoits. The Raja is very pleased with the bravery of Ajit and appoints him as a captain in his Palace Army. Ajit falls in love with the Raja's daughter Jwala.

The people of Seema Desh are completely frustrated with the evil and treacherous rule of Kumar, the son of the Raja of Rampur, and his wicked Minister Vikram. The once rich and prosperous people are now nothing but poor, unhappy paupers with no pride and dignity in them. Anup Singh cannot tolerate this vile treatment to his subjects and, with the help of friends, becomes a dacoit, robbing only the treasures of the Raja of Rampur.

Not knowing the real identity of his father, nor knowing the real reason of the looting of the treasures by Anup Singh, Ajit takes upon himself the task of capturing the Dacoit. Thus father and son engage in a fight to the finish.

== Cast ==
- Madhubala as Rajkumari Jwala
- Sunil Dutt as Ajit
- Sohrab Modi as Maharaja Anup Singh
- Pran as Kumar
- Ulhas as the king of Rampur
- David Abraham as Vanaraj
- Gajanan Jagirdar as Vikram
- Raj Mehra as Maharaja Rampur
- Asha Parekh as Ranjana
- Kumari Kamala as dancer
- Vijay Laxmi
- Lalita Pawar
- Leena
- Nazar
- Sabina
- Roshan
- Poonam
- Shashi
- Naaz
- Shivraj
- Brahm Bharadwaj
- Chaman Puri
- Kesri
- Mukri
- Kumud Tripathi
- Kharyati
- Keshav
- Kapoor
- Vishvas Kunte
- Vijay
- Shobha
- Daisy Irani

Dances Choreographers

- Gopikrishna
- Sudarshan Kumar
- Shetty

Animal Trainer

- Govindraj

Stunts

- Shetty

== Production ==
Jwala was primarily shot in the mid-1950s, when Madhubala was alive. The film was shelved for a decade when she fell ill between the filming. After her untimely death in 1969, filming resumed with various actresses doubling for Madhubala. Asha Parekh, then a little-known child artist, had played a supporting role in the film.

== Music ==
Jwala

Soundtrack album by Shankar-Jaikishan
- Released: 1971
- Genre: Feature film soundtrack
- Length: 28:00
- Language: Hindi
- Label: Saregama

All music is composed by Shankar-Jaikishan.

Songs
No.	Title	Lyrics	Singer(s)	Length
1.	"Aaja Re Aaja More Sajan"	Rajendra Krishan	Lata Mangeshkar & Manna Dey	3:35
2.	"Aha Le Gai Woh Jiya Le Gai"	Shailendra	Lata Mangeshkar & Asha Bhosle	3:39
3.	"Dekho Ji Ankhon Men Dekho"	Rajendra Krishan	Lata Mangeshkar	3:33
4.	"Duniya Ki Kitabon Se Ek Din"	Shailendra	Mohammed Rafi	3:37
5.	"Haule Haule Ek Bhi Na Ghunghroo"	Rajendra Krishan	Geeta Dutt, Lata Mangeshkar & Sudha Malhotra	3:55
6.	"Jagi Raat Bhar Teri Yaad Men"	Rajendra Krishan	Lata Mangeshkar	3:38
7.	"Mera Jwala Naam Jiya Jalana Kam"	Rajendra Krishan	Lata Mangeshkar	3:35
8.	"Tham Lo Kaleja Sab Apna Apna"	Rajendra Krishan	Mukesh	3:24
Total length:				28:00

== Release ==
Jwala was released in only limited number of theatres on 1 July 1971. Sunil Dutt and Sohrab Modi were initially given the top-billing over Madhubala in the opening credits, but the actress' name appeared on the first position in all the posters and publicity stills. It was Dutt who had insisted that Madhubala be given the top-billing since she was a bigger star than him.

== Reception ==
The film underperformed commercially, and reviews were predominantly negative, with most of the critics focusing on Madhubala's final performance.

Writing retrospectively, Cinestaan called the film "a haphazard mess". It further criticised the film for providing Madhubala lesser screen time: "Despite being the title character, Madhubala is pushed to the background." Khatija Akbar, who wrote Madhubala's biography in 1997 commented "The film, however, must be seen and savoured if only for the pleasure of viewing Madhubala in sapphire, in black, in red, for the rare experience of rich brown hair and a translucent milk and roses complexion."
