= Raaj Kumar =

Indian film actor (1926-1996)

- Kumar, c. 1959
- Born: Kulbhushan Pandit; 8 October 1926; Loralai, Baluchistan, British India (now in Balochistan, Pakistan)
- Died: 3 July 1996 (aged 69); Mumbai, Maharashtra, India
- Occupations: Film actor; Police officer
- Years active: 1952–1995
- Employer: Bombay Police
- Spouse: Gayatri Kumar
- Children: 3 (including Puru Raaj Kumar)

Raaj Kumar (born Kulbhushan Pandit; 8 October 1926 – 3 July 1996) was an Indian actor who worked in Hindi films. In a career that spanned over four decades, he went on to star in 70 films and is regarded as one of the greatest actors of Indian cinema.

== Personal life ==
Kulbhushan Pandit was born on 8 October, 1926 in Loralai, in the Baluchistan Province of British India (now in Balochistan, Pakistan) into a Kashmiri family. Kumar's family were Kashmiri Pandits who had migrated from Srinagar to Balochistan.

In the late 1940s, Kumar moved to Bombay, where he became a sub-inspector under Bombay Police. In the 1960s, he married Jennifer Pandit, an Anglo-Indian, whom he met on a flight where she was an air hostess. She later changed her name to Gayatri Kumar as per Hindu customs. They had three children, sons Puru Raaj Kumar (an actor), Panini Raaj Kumar and daughter Vastavikta Pandit, who made her screen debut in 2006 film Eight: The Power of Shani.

=== Legal issues ===
After the release of Mother India in 1957, Kumar was out with his friend, director Prakash Aurora and his wife for an evening drive near Juhu beach. They pulled up to a local paan store where, a few men gathered around and started to heckle Kumar and pass derogatory remark about Aurora's wife. Eventually, Kumar retaliated and a major fight broke out. According to reports, one man was found dead and Kumar was later arrested. The trial lasted a year before he was acquitted of all charges. Kumar's police background was said to be one of the deciding factors that helped him. Kumar had to take a break from acting for a year to fight his case before he returned in 1959 with Paigham.

== Career ==
=== 1952–1964: Early career and breakthrough ===
Raaj Kumar began his career with Rangeeli in 1952 and followed it with Anmol Sahar (1952), Aabshar (1953), Ghamand (1955), none of which could establish him. After many years of struggle, he got his breakthrough with Mehboob Khan's epic drama film Mother India (1957). It opened to critical acclaim and emerged an All Time Blockbuster at the box office as well as the most successful film of the 1950s. It went on to win several accolades and was featured in the book 1001 Movies You Must See Before You Die. The huge box office success of Mother India was followed by another blockbuster in S. S. Vasan's social drama film Paigham (1959), which had Dilip Kumar and Vyjayanthimala in the lead. Kumar received praise for his performance of a caring elder brother and got a nomination in the Filmfare Award for Best Supporting Actor category.

Kumar began the new decade with Kishore Sahu's romantic drama Dil Apna Aur Preet Parai. The film became a box office hit with one of its song "Ajeeb Dastan Hai Yeh" sung by Lata Mangeshkar becoming a chartbuster. In 1961, he appeared alongside Rajendra Kumar and Asha Parekh in Gharana. A remake of Telugu blockbuster Shanthi Nivasam, the film proved to be equally successful in Hindi and was a box office success. After an absence lasting a year, he reunited with Rajendra Kumar and Meena Kumari for C. V. Sridhar's romantic drama Dil Ek Mandir. It opened to a positive audience response and went on to become a hit, with Kumar receiving the Filmfare Award for Best Supporting Actor for his performance. His other major release of the year, Phool Bane Angaare also did reasonably well at the box office. In 1964, he once again worked with Rajendra Kumar and Vyjayanthimala in Ramanand Sagar's second directional venture Zindagi. The film opened to positive response and added one more box office hit in his kitty.

=== 1965–1979: Rise to stardom and continued success ===
After many years of doing second leads, Raaj Kumar became a saleable star in 1965 with Yash Chopra's ensemble masala film Waqt and Ram Maheshwari's romantic drama Kaajal, both of which opened to massive response from audience and went on to become blockbusters. For portraying a sophisticated thief in Waqt, Kumar won massive acclaim and his second Filmfare Award for Best Supporting Actor. His performance in Kaajal was also appreciated and he received his first and only nomination in the Filmfare Award for Best Actor category for the film. Kumar's other notable release of the year was Phani Majumdar's drama film Oonche Log co-starring Ashok Kumar and Feroz Khan. The film received positive reviews from critics and won National Film Award for Second Best Feature Film in Hindi. After having no release in 1966, the following year, he reunited with makers of Waqt for the suspense thriller Hamraaz. The film proved to be a major critical and commercial success, eventually emerging a blockbuster and winning National Film Award for Best Feature Film in Hindi. One of its song, "Neele Gagan Ke Tale", sung by Mahendra Kapoor and filmed on Kumar and Vimi proved to be an instant hit and won Kapoor his second Filmfare Award for Best Male Playback Singer. He also reunited with C. V. Sridhar (the director of Dil Ek Mandir) for the multi-starrer social drama Nai Roshni, but contrary to expectations, it did not perform well. He concluded the decade with two biggies - Mere Huzoor and Neel Kamal. While the former co-starring Jeetendra and Mala Sinha did moderately well, the latter alongside Manoj Kumar and Waheeda Rehman was a blockbuster and one of the top five highest-grossing films of 1968. For portraying a soul longing for his lost love in Neel Kamal, Kumar received his fifth and final nomination in the Filmfare Award for Best Supporting Actor category.

The early-1970s saw Kumar appearing in some of his most iconic films. His only release of 1970 was Chetan Anand's romantic musical Heer Raanjha opposite Priya Rajvansh. It opened to highly positive reviews from critics and emerged a box office hit. The soundtrack of Heer Raanjha composed by Madan Mohan was a chartbuster with a Mohammed Rafi solo - "Yeh Duniya, Yeh Mehfil Mere Kaam Ki Nahin" becoming a rage among the masses. The success of Heer Raanjha was followed by Lal Patthar and Maryada in 1971. While, Lal Patthar in which he got paired with Hema Malini was an average fare, Maryada opposite Mala Sinha and co-starring Rajesh Khanna proved to be a hit. In 1972, Kumar appeared in Kamal Amrohi's magnum opus Pakeezah which also had Meena Kumari (in her final film appearance) and Ashok Kumar in the lead. Despite receiving polarizing reviews and being a slow starter, it went on to become a massive blockbuster at the box office and gained cult status in later years. Its soundtrack composed by Naushad dominated the musical charts and was the eighth best-selling Hindi film album of the 1970s.

Kumar then appeared in films, Dil Ka Raja (1972), Hindustan Ki Kasam (1973) and 36 Ghante (1974), all three of which flopped at the box office. This changed with Brij Sadanah's's action comedy film Ek Se Badhkar Ek (1976), alongside Ashok Kumar, Navin Nischol and Sharmila Tagore. The film performed very well at the box office and was also remade in Telugu as Mugguru Muggure. In 1978, Kumar reunited with Jeetendra and Mala Sinha for Ram Maheshwari's action drama film Karmayogi in which he played a double role. It opened to a positive response from critics and emerged a hit.

=== 1980–1995: Career slump, comeback and final works ===
Kumar began the 1980s with Ram Maheshwari's dacoit drama Chambal Ki Kasam, which sank without a trace. In 1981, he had two releases, out of which, Esmayeel Shroff's crime thriller Bulundi proved to be a moderate fare while Chetan Anand's reincarnation drama Kudrat alongside Rajesh Khanna, Vinod Khanna, Hema Malini and Priya Rajvansh was a critical and commercial failure. In 1982, he reunited with Rajesh Khanna and Jeetendra for Sultan Ahmed's successful actioner Dharam Kanta. This was followed by a series of critical and commercial duds in Ek Nai Paheli (1984), Sharara (1984), Raaj Tilak (1984), Itihaas (1987), Muqaddar Ka Faisla (1987), Mohabbat Ke Dushman (1988), Saazish (1988), Mahaveera (1988) and Jung Baaz (1989). During this phase, Kumar remained steady with hits in Mehul Kumar's Marte Dam Tak (1987) and Esmayeel Shroff's Suryaa: An Awakening (1989).

Kumar began the 1990s with another of Esmayeel Shroff's film, the crime thriller Police Public (1990). An adaptation of Oru CBI Diary Kurippu (1988), it performed well commercially and went on to become a box office hit. The following year, he reunited with his Paigham co-star Dilip Kumar for Subhash Ghai's action drama film Saudagar. The film took a record opening and emerged a blockbuster at the box office as well as the highest-earner of 1991. Its soundtrack composed by Laxmikant–Pyarelal was a chartbuster and the fourth best-selling Hindi film album of that year. The following year, he had another commercial success in K. C. Bokadia's Police Aur Mujrim. In 1993, Kumar starred alongside Nana Patekar in Mehul Kumar's magnum opus, the patriotic action drama Tirangaa (1993). Tirangaa opened to excellent response all over the nation and proved to be another blockbuster for the actor. It was also the final box office success of Kumar as his later films like Betaaj Badshah (1994), Jawab (1995) and God and Gun (1995) (which was his last film role) were critical and commercial failures.

== Death ==
Kumar died at the age of 69 on 3 July 1996 from throat cancer. According to his son Puru Raaj Kumar in an interview with Farhana Farook, his father suffered from Hodgkins for which he had undergone chemotherapy. In the last two years of his life, cancer was recurring in the lungs and ribs.

== Public image and legacy ==
Raaj Kumar is regarded as one of the greatest actors in Indian cinema. His baritone voice and distinctive dialogue delivery inspired writers to create roles infused with his trademark wit and sarcasm. His catch phrase Jaani, first heard in Waqt (1965), and his insistence on wearing white shoes became extensions of his on screen persona, earned him the name "Prince of Bollywood". However, this highly stylised approach also became a limitation. As filmmakers increasingly relied on his vocal charisma and mannerisms, his performances grew repetitive, with exaggerated theatrics and ornate costumes overshadowing character depth, according to some critics.

During the early 1970s, when Zeenat Aman was rapidly ascending to stardom following her breakout role in Hare Rama Hare Krishna, she met Raaj Kumar at a film premiere. Although she was already a rising star, Kumar reportedly said to her sarcastically: "Zeenat, you are very beautiful. Why don't you try acting?". Aman later clarified in an episode of The Kapil Sharma Show, that this was indeed just a rumor and it didn't actually happen.

Kumar was also known for being outspoken and egocentric. Both actor Mukesh Khanna and director Subhash Ghai recalled having to temper his temperament on the set of Saudagar. In contrast, many colleagues like Rajendra Kumar, Danny Denzongpa and Raza Murad recall his intellect, wit and moments of genuine humility.

In 2022, he was placed in Outlook India's "75 Best Bollywood Actors" list.

== Filmography ==
| Year | Title | Role | Notes |
|---|---|---|---|
| 1952 | Rangeeli | N/A | |
| 1952 | Anmol Sahara | N/A | |
| 1953 | Aabshar | N/A | |
| 1955 | Ghamand | N/A | |
| 1957 | Krishna Sudama | N/A | |
| 1957 | Mother India | Shyamu | |
| 1957 | Nausherwan-E-Adil | Shehzada Naushazad / Joseph | |
| 1957 | Neelmani | N/A | |
| 1958 | Dulhan | Mohan | |
| 1958 | Panchayat | Mohan | |
| 1959 | Durga Mata | N/A | |
| 1959 | Paigham | Ram Lal | |
| 1959 | Shararat | Suraj | |
| 1959 | Ardhangini | Prakash | |
| 1959 | Swarg Se Sundar Desh Hamara | N/A | |
| 1959 | Ujala | Kalu | |
| 1960 | Dil Apna Aur Preet Parai | Dr. Sushil Verma | |
| 1961 | Gharana | Kailash | |
| 1963 | Dil Ek Mandir | Ram | |
| 1963 | Godaan | Hari | |
| 1963 | Phool Bane Angaare | Captain Rajesh | |
| 1963 | Pyar Ka Bandhan | Kalu | |
| 1964 | Zindagi | Gopal | |
| 1965 | Waqt | Raja Chinnoy (Raju) | |
| 1965 | Kaajal | Moti | |
| 1965 | Oonche Log | Inspector Shrikant | |
| 1965 | Rishte Naate | Sundar | |
| 1967 | Hamraaz | Captain Rajesh | |
| 1967 | Nai Roshni | Jyoti Kumar | |
| 1968 | Mere Huzoor | Nawab Salim | |
| 1968 | Neel Kamal | Chitrasen | |
| 1968 | Vaasna | Kailash Chander | |
| 1970 | Heer Raanjha | Ranjha | |
| 1971 | Lal Patthar | Bahadur Gyan Shankar Rai | |
| 1971 | Maryada | Raja Babu / Raj Bahadur | |
| 1972 | Pakeezah | Salim Ahmed Khan | |
| 1972 | Dil Ka Raaja | Raja Raghupati Singh / Raju (Note: Kumar played two characters.) | |
| 1973 | Hindustan Ki Kasam | Rajib | |
| 1974 | 36 Ghante | Editor Ashok Rai | |
| 1976 | Ek Se Badhkar Ek | Shankar | |
| 1978 | Karmayogi | Shankar / Mohan | |
| 1980 | Chambal Ki Kasam | Thakur Suraj Singh | |
| 1981 | Bulundi | Professor Satish Khurana | |
| 1981 | Kudrat | Choudhary Janak Singh | |
| 1982 | Dharam Kanta | Thakur Bhawani Singh | |
| 1983 | Film Hi Film | Himself | Guest appearance |
| 1984 | Ek Nai Paheli | Upendranath | |
| 1984 | Raaj Tilak | Samadh Khan | |
| 1984 | Sharara | Dharamveer Singh Pathan | |
| 1987 | Itihaas | Joginder Singh | |
| 1987 | Marte Dam Tak | Sub Inspector Rana | |
| 1987 | Muqaddar Ka Faisla | Pandit Krishnakant | |
| 1988 | Mohabbat Ke Dushman | Rehmat Khan | |
| 1988 | Saazish | Kailash | |
| 1988 | Mahaveera | DSP Karamveer / Don | |
| 1989 | Desh Ke Dushman | Sher Khan | |
| 1989 | Jungbaaz | Advocate Krishna Prasad Saxena | |
| 1989 | Galiyon Ka Badshah | Ram / Raja | |
| 1989 | Suryaa: An Awakening | Collector Rajpal Chauhan | |
| 1990 | Police Public | CBI Inspector Jagmohan Azad | |
| 1991 | Saudagar | Thakur Rajeshwar Singh | |
| 1992 | Police Aur Mujrim | Police Commissioner Veer Bahadur Singh | |
| 1993 | Insaniyat Ke Devta | Jailor Rana Pratap | |
| 1993 | Tirangaa | Brigadier Suryadev Singh | |
| 1994 | Betaaj Badshah | Raja Prithviraj | |
| 1994 | Ulfat Ki Nayee Manzilen | Raj | |
| 1995 | Jawab | Ashwini Kumar Saxena | |
| 1995 | God And Gun | Sahib Bahadur Rathore | |

== Awards and nominations ==
| Year | Category | Film | Result |
|---|---|---|---|
| 1964 | Best Supporting Actor | Dil Ek Mandir | Won |
| 1966 | Best Supporting Actor | Waqt | Won |
| 1966 | Best Actor | Kaajal | Nominated |
| 1966 | Best Supporting Actor | Kaajal | Nominated |
| 1969 | Best Supporting Actor | Neel Kamal | Nominated |
