= Brij Sadanah =

Indian film director (1933–1990)

- Born: 6 October 1933; Gujranwala, British India
- Died: 21 October 1990 (aged 57); Bombay, Maharashtra, India
- Other name: Brijmohan
- Spouse: Sayeeda Khan
- Children: 2 (inc. Kamal Sadanah)
- Relatives: Sadanah family

Brijmohan Sadanah (6 October 1933 – 21 October 1990), often credited as Brij, was an Indian film producer and director known for his work in Hindi cinema. He is very well known for some of the most memorable box office hit films from the 1960s to 1980s such as Do Bhai, Yeh Raat Phir Na Aaygi, Ustadon Ke Ustad, Night In London, Victoria No. 203, Chori Mera Kaam, Ek Se Badhkar Ek, Yakeen and Professor Pyarelal. His last successful film was Mardon Wali Baat. He consistently chose to have Kalyanji–Anandji as the music directors of his films.

He was married to Hindi film actress, Sayeeda Khan (also known as Sudha Sadanah). They had two children, daughter Namrata and son Kamal Sadanah.

In the early 1980s, he suffered a major setback when some of his films turned out to be major flops at the box office like Oonche Log, Bombay 405 Miles and Magroor. The string of flops ended with the success of Taqdeer and Mardonwali Baat.

Sadanah died on 21 October 1990 at his residence in Mumbai. While inebriated, he fatally shot himself after killing his wife and daughter, on his son Kamal's birthday.

== Filmography ==
Director

- Mardonwali Baat (1988)
- Oonche Log (1985)
- Taqdeer (1983)
- Professor Pyarelal (1981)
- Bombay 405 Miles (1980)
- Magroor (1979)
- Ek Se Badhkar Ek (1976)
- Chori Mera Kaam (1975)
- Paise Ki Gudiya (1974)
- Victoria No. 203 (1972)
- Kathputli (1971)
- Yakeen (1969)
- Do Bhai (1969)
- Night In London (1967)
- Yeh Raat Phir Na Aaygi (1966)
- Afsana (1966)
- Ustadon Ke Ustad (1963)
- Tu Nahin Aur Sahi (1960)
- Nai Raahen (1959)
- Bhule Bhatke (1956)

Producer

- Mardonwali Baat (1988)
- Taqdeer (1983)
- Bombay 405 Miles (1980)
- Ek Se Badhkar Ek (1976)
- Victoria No. 203 (1972)
- Kathputli (1971)
- Do Bhai (1969)
- Ustadon Ke Ustad (1963)

Actor

- Night In London (1967)
- Ek Saal (1957)

== See also ==
- Divya Bharti
- Gulshan Kumar
- Guru Dutt
- Raj Kiran (actor)
- List of people who disappeared mysteriously: post-1970
