= Anokhi Ada =

Anokhi Ada (lit. 'Unique Style') may refer to these Indian films:

- Anokhi Ada (1948 film), a romantic Hindi film
- Anokhi Ada (1973 film), an Indian Hindi-language action film
