= Desh Ke Dushman =

- Directed by: Swaroop Kumar
- Produced by: Manmohan Kapur
- Starring: Raaj Kumar; Hema Malini
- Music by: Sonik Omi
- Release date: 1989
- Country: India
- Language: Hindi

Desh Ke Dushman is a 1989 Bollywood action film directed by Swaroop Kumar, the film stars Raaj Kumar, Hema Malini, Aditya Pancholi, Mandakini, Sadashiv Amrapurkar and Navin Nischol.

== Cast ==
- Raaj Kumar as Sher Khan
- Hema Malini as Inspector Kiran Gupta
- Aditya Pancholi as Umesh Gupta
- Mandakini as Anita
- Navin Nischol as Inspector Suraj Gupta
- Sadashiv Amrapurkar as Rakesh Verma "Raka"
- Om Shivpuri as Police Commissioner SK Bhatnagar
- Chandrashekhar as Madan
- Tej Sapru as Pratap Verma
- Narendranath as Jagga

== Plot ==
Suraj Gupta, a police inspector, lives a modest life with his wife, Kiran, and Umesh, their young son. The brave officer apprehends and kills a dreaded outlaw named Jagga. As a result, Rakesh Verma, who is Jagga's brother, vows to revenge by wiping out the Gupta family which he starts by killing Suraj. Faced by imminent danger, Kiran goes rans as she seeks to join the police force to revenge on her husband's killers. Years later, a grown up Umesh turns into a drunkard and has fallen in love with a cabaret dancer named Anita, something that angers his mother. Unknown to Kiran and Umesh, Anita is working with Rakesh and Jagga's son, Pratap. The two are on their way to kill the remaining members of Gupta's family with the help of a hired hit-man named Sher Khan.

== Soundtrack ==
Lyricist: Verma Malik

| Song | Singer |
|---|---|
| "Vande Mataram" | Mahendra Kapoor |
| "Eid Ke Din Aaj Mujhko Sab Ka Pyar Mil Gaya" | Mahendra Kapoor, Omi |
| "Tu Bambai Ki Botal" | Amit Kumar |
| "Jo Mujhe Dekhega Tirchhi Nigah Karke" | Mohammed Aziz, Asha Bhosle |
| "Main Hoon Nagina, Mere Jaisi Milegi Na Koi Haseena" | Mohammed Aziz, Asha Bhosle |
| "Shikari Brahmachari" | Asha Bhosle |
| "Jo Zulm Kiye Tune" | Asha Bhosle |
