= Professor Pyarelal =

- Film poster of Professor Pyarelal
- Directed by: Brij Sadanah
- Written by: Dhruva Chatterjee
- Produced by: TM Bihari
- Starring: Dharmendra; Zeenat Aman; Simi Garewal; Shriram Lagoo; Amjad Khan; Vinod Mehra
- Edited by: Hrishikesh Mukherjee
- Music by: Kalyanji-Anandji
- Release date: 5 June 1981
- Language: Hindi

Professor Pyarelal is a 1981 Hindi film produced by T.M. Bihari, directed by Brij Sadanah, featuring Dharmendra, Zeenat Aman, Simi Garewal, Shreeram Lagoo, Amjad Khan and Nirupa Roy in the lead roles. Kalyanji-Anandji have composed the music, while Rajendra Krishan has written the lyrics for the film. Hrishikesh Mukherjee has done the editing for the film.

Some of the scenes were filmed in the United Kingdom, notably in the West London area of Uxbridge and Hillingdon, Middlesex.

== Cast ==
- Dharmendra as Ram Shinde / Professor Pyarelal
- Zeenat Aman as Sonia B. Singh / Asha Rai
- Simi Garewal as Rita
- Nirupa Roy as Shanti
- Shriram Lagoo as Kishanchand / King
- Amjad Khan as Ronnie / Ranjit Singh / Gomes
- Jeevan as Shyamlal / Sammy
- Vinod Mehra as Professor Pyarelal
- Satyen Kappu as Police Commissioner Albert D'Souza
- Shammi Kapoor Mr. Rai

== Soundtrack ==
The music of the film was composed by Kalyanji-Anandji and lyrics by Rajendra Krishan.

#	Song	Singer
1	"Gaa Gaa Gaa Gaaye Ja" (version 1)	Kishore Kumar, Manhar Udhas
2	"Gaa Gaa Gaa Gaayeja" (sad)	Kishore Kumar
3	"Aisa Bhi Aata Hai Mauka"	Kishore Kumar
4	"Dil Ki Khushi Yun"	Kishore Kumar
5	"Tere Siva Na Kisi Ka Banunga"	Mohammed Rafi, Asha Bhosle
6	"Aage Aage Ek Haseena"	Asha Bhosle
7	"Gaa Gaa Gaa Gaayeja" (version 2)	Asha Bhosle
8	"Dilwala Mastana"	Asha Bhosle
9	"Professor Pyarelal"	–
10	"Yeh Vaada Raha Dilruba"	Mohammed Rafi, Asha Bhosle
