= Insaan Aur Shaitan =

- Directed by: Aspi Irani
- Starring: Sanjeev Kumar and Aruna Irani
- Release date: 1970
- Country: India
- Language: Hindi

Insaan Aur Shaitan is a 1970 Bollywood action film directed by Aspi Irani. The film stars Sanjeev Kumar and Aruna Irani.

== Cast ==
- Sanjeev Kumar as Vijay / Jay (Bichho) Double role
- Faryal as Ratna
- Iftekhar
- Sheikh Mukhtar
- Gajanan Jagirdar
- Aruna Irani as Usha
- Hiralal
- M. B. Shetty
- Chaman Puri

== Soundtrack ==
| Serial | Song title | Singer(s) |
|---|---|---|
| 1 | "Chalte Chalo" | Mohammed Rafi |
| 2 | "Humne Jo Tumko" | Asha Bhosle |
| 3 | "Koyi Aaye Baahon Mein" | Asha Bhosle |
| 4 | "Teri Ada" | Asha Bhosle |
