= Doosra Keval =

- Genre: Drama
- Directed by: Lekh Tandon
- Starring: Shahrukh Khan; Arun Bali; Vineeta Malik; Natasha Rana
- Country of origin: India
- Original language: Hindi
- No. of episodes: 13

Production
- Producer: Manoj Sahni

Original release
- Network: DD National
- Release: 1989 – 1990

Doosra Keval is a 1989 TV serial starring Shahrukh Khan, Arun Bali, Vineeta Malik, Natasha Rana, Rajendra Nath and Jayshree Arora.

== Plot ==
This is story of a family where Keval, a village lad, goes to town and never returns. The story is told through the memories of his mother, daughter and the villagers. At the end, Keval's (Shahrukh Khan) friend comes to his home and his family accepts him as the second Keval. This is considered as a reincarnation of Keval; hence, the name "Doosra Keval" (Hindi) or "The Second Keval".

== Cast ==
- Shahrukh Khan as Keval: A village boy who was killed by his close friend for not doing illegal work for him.
- Arun Bali as Kirpal Singh (Keval's uncle: An older person who helps Keval)
- Vineeta Malik as Keval's mother: A simple housewife.
- Natasha Rana as Kamla (Keval's sister): A teenaged younger village girl.
- Adil Rana as Mangat Ram
- Rajendra Nath as Dhiru
- Jayshree Arora as Mrs. Ahluwalia (Keval's employer)
- Simran Chadha as Meeta (Keval's love interest)
- Prem Bhatia as Meeta's brother
- Naresh Gosai as Keshav (inspector who handles the case of keval's murder)
