= Ganga Ki Saugandh =

1978 Indian Hindi film

- Film poster
- Directed by: Sultan Ahmed
- Written by: Nabendu Ghosh; Asgar Mirza; Wajahat Mirza; Santosh Vyas
- Produced by: Sultan Ahmed
- Starring: Amitabh Bachchan; Rekha; Amjad Khan; Bindu
- Cinematography: R.D. Mathur
- Edited by: M. S. Shinde
- Music by: Kalyanji Anandji
- Distributed by: Sultan Productions; Polydor
- Release date: February 10, 1978
- Country: India
- Language: Hindi
- Box office: ₹5.5 crores (equivalent to ₹128 crores or US$16.5 million in 2021)

Ganga Ki Saugandh is a 1978 Hindi-language action drama film produced and directed by Sultan Ahmed. It was released on February 10, 1978. The film stars Amitabh Bachchan, Rekha, Amjad Khan, Pran, I. S. Johar, Bindu, and Anju Mahendru. The title soundtrack was composed by Kalyanji-Anandji and the screenplay was written by Indian screenwriter and director Wajahat Mirza. It was a hit. Irrfan Khan watched the shooting of Ganga Ki Saugandh, which took place in his hometown when he was a lad.

== Synopsis ==
The film begins as Thakur Jaswant Singh (Amjad Khan) rules over the area of the film's setting. He rapes Champa (Farida Jalal), who is the daughter of Keshavram (only mentioned as "Munshi"), a secretary (Nana Palshikar). Singh cares only about money, women, and alcohol. After his father's death, he assumes control over the region and increases taxes.

One day, while walking across a hallway, he slips on a wet floor and falls. He angrily gets up and assaults an older woman, Ramvati (Achala Sachdev), who was washing the floor. His abuse is interrupted by the arrival of Ramvati's son, Jeeva (Amitabh Bachchan). Singh is ready to shoot him, but his mother, Rani Maa (Sulochana Latkar), stops him. Jeeva is now in trouble with the Singhs, and soon many people conspire against him.

Singh (Amjad Khan), his pandit Kashinath (Satyen Kappu), and Lala (Jeevan) conspire to frame Jeeva for poisoning a cow. The next day, Jeeva is summoned before the village council to explain his involvement in the cow's death. Because Jeeva has no satisfactory explanation, he is beaten brutally by Singh's men. Kalu Chamar (Pran), a shoemaker, tries to help him but fails. Jeeva and the villagers are then asked to leave the village with his mother. At the same time, Kalu, the leader of the villagers, attempts to start a new colony with the help of his friend (Anwar Hussain).

As Jeeva refuses to leave the village, he is severely beaten again and thrown out. Shortly after, his mother passes away, and Jeeva attempts to avenge her death. He becomes a dacoity (member of a band of armed robbers). Jeeva swears on the river Ganges to wipe out Singh and his men, not knowing his decision will bring him into conflict with the police and honest people from the community from which he was exiled.

Later, when Singh loots five lakhs from the villagers, and Jeeva is initially suspected, he clears his name and condemns Singh. In the end, Singh charters a small airplane and crashes it at Laxman Jhula, killing himself.

== Soundtrack ==
Lyricist: Anjaan

#	Title	Singer(s)
1	"Roop Jab Aisa Mila"	Kishore Kumar
2	"Aankh Ladi Humse" (duet)	Kishore Kumar, Asha Bhosle
3	"Aankh Ladi Humse" (female)	Asha Bhosle
4	"Maano To Main Ganga Maa Hoon"	Lata Mangeshkar
5	"Toone Har Raat"	Lata Mangeshkar
6	"Chal Musafir, Teri Manzil Door Hai To Kya Hua"	Mohammed Rafi
7	"Dekho Sapne"	Mohammed Rafi, Amit Kumar, Aarti Mukherji

== Criticism ==
Swati Goel Sharma on Sangam Talks criticized the movie by saying - "A film called "Ganga Ki Saugandh" was released, and the person who made it shifted to Pakistan a few years later. Listen, his name was something like Mirza, and the theme of his film is that there are four characters: Pandit, Thakur, Baniya, and their names are exactly these. The Pandit's name is Pandit, Thakur's name is Thakur, Baniya's name is Lala. Yes, and there is a man from the scheduled caste, his name is Kallu, played by Pran, and the hero is Amitabh Bachchan. So the entire theory of the film is that Kallu was troubled a lot by the three, but Rahim Chacha treated him like a human being, only Rahim Chacha did. And later, Amitabh Bachchan took revenge on everyone, and Amitabh Bachchan doesn't follow any religion, in fact, he burned his own tuft of hair, the shikha."
