= Victoria No. 203 (1972 film) =

- Directed by: Brij
- Written by: Ehsan Rizvi
- Screenplay by: K. A. Narayan
- Story by: K. A. Narayan
- Produced by: Brij
- Starring: Ashok Kumar; Saira Banu; Pran; Ranjeet
- Cinematography: Anwar Siraj
- Edited by: Waman Rao
- Music by: Kalyanji–Anandji
- Distributed by: Dynamo International
- Release date: 8 December 1972
- Running time: 163 minutes
- Country: India
- Language: Hindi

Victoria No. 203 is a 1972 Indian Hindi-language heist comedy film produced and directed by Brij. The film stars Saira Banu, Navin Nischol, Ranjeet, Anwar Hussain and Helen. Ashok Kumar and Pran play key supporting roles and earned the Filmfare nominations for the film. The music by Kalyanji–Anandji and the roles of Ashok Kumar and Pran made this a "superhit" at the box office.

The movie was remade in Telugu in 1974 as Andaru Dongale starring Shobhan Babu and Laxmi and in Tamil in 1974 as Vairam starring Jaishankar and Jayalalithaa. The 1995 Kannada movie Giddu Dada was also inspired by this movie. Priyadarshan scripted Malayalam film Samrambham is also its remake. It was also remade in Bengali in 2005 as Chore Chore Mastuto Bhai. A Hindi remake of the film produced by Brij's son Kamal Sadanah was released in August 2007 with the same title. The climax of this movie went on to be reused in the 1994 cult classic comedy Andaz Apna Apna.

== Summary ==
When Seth Durgadas steals some precious diamonds, one henchman turns traitor and decamps with the booty. The man is killed, but the diamonds are not found. A Victoria driver is wrongly sentenced to life since he was the last man to be seen with the dead man. Here, two crooks get the scent of the diamonds. The driver's daughter wants to prove her father's innocence. Durgadas's son Kumar too joins the forces after learning his true nature. Will this weird team find the diamonds? What surprises do they have in store for them?

== Plot ==
Seth Durgadas is a rich businessman, revered by his son Kumar and society. In reality, Durgadas is the leader of a smuggling gang. As a trusted member of society, he gets all information, while his gang executes his plans. However, during one such robbery, a gang member turns greedy and flees with the diamonds. Durgadas sends another man to retrieve the diamonds and kill the traitor. The traitor is killed, but the killer too flees with the diamonds.

A furious Durgadas sends some henchmen to kill the traitor and retrieve the diamonds. The henchmen corner and kill the traitor, but the latter has succeeded in hiding the diamonds somewhere. Meanwhile, a Victoria driver of the eponymous Victoria, who was found near the dead body, is arrested based on circumstantial evidence. Somewhere else, two old golden-hearted crooks, Raja and Rana are to be released. Rana had an infant son who was kidnapped from a park. To date, Rana doesn't know who kidnapped him or whether his son is even alive.

The duo want to spend the rest of their lives as good, respected men. The plan is short lived when they find themselves on the trail of the diamonds. Soon, they learn about the Victoria and realise that no one has got a scent of the missing diamonds. To get closer to the Victoria, they pose as distant cousins of the Victoria driver, who are reluctantly admitted inside by the drivers elder daughter Rekha, who soon starts acting suspiciously.

During the day, Rekha rides the Victoria, posing as a man while during the night, when everyone is supposedly sleeping, she slips out of the home. One day, Raja and Rana follow her to the house of a man, who unknown to them, is Durgadas's henchman. They are shocked to see Rekha seducing him. But when the henchman tries to rape her, the duo save her. On accosting her, she tells that the man was loitering suspiciously near the Victoria when her father was arrested. Before they can know anything from him, he is shot dead.

On learning the Victoria drivers story, the duo decide to do one good turn. They tell Rekha the whole truth, but a shocked Rekha doesn't have a clue about the location of diamonds. Even after tearing the Victoria apart, nothing is found. Meanwhile, Rekha falls in love with Kumar, whom she met while posing as a cab driver. She tries to woo him posing as a rich lady, a plan which works well. However, Kumar learns the truth and decides to marry her, despite knowing about her father.

Kumar also meets Raja and Rana, whereupon he gets suspicious of the duo. Here, Durgadas objects to Kumar's relationship with Rekha. Later, Kumar learns of his father's true nature and leaves him. After meeting Rekha, Raja and Rana tell the truth to him too. The quartet decide to find the diamonds. Here, Durgadas kidnaps Rekha on learning that she is the daughter of the Victoria driver. Later, Kumar, Raja and Rana are also kidnapped and tortured.

During this deal, Durgadas's drinks are being served on an ornate tray with a fake Victoria headlamp attached to it. Suddenly, Rana realizes that the diamonds are hidden in the Victoria's lamp. He buys time for himself and his old buddy, and they go to retrieve the diamonds. The duo turn up at Durgadas's den, where they manage to create a confusion by luring the gang members to the diamonds. Durgadas is embarrassed to see that not one member of his gang is loyal to him.

During the melee, another twist occurs when an old henchman of Durgadas reveals that Kumar isn't Durgadas's son, but Rana's. Durgadas had ordered the henchman to steal somebody's child because Durgadas's father had threatened to disown him. Durgadas could have prevented the situation only by proving that Durgadas has fathered a child. In the end, Durgadas and his remaining cronies are arrested and Rekha's father is set free.

After being reunited with his son and his would be daughter-in-law, Rana decides to settle down. However, Raja decides that his destiny might have written something else for him and leaves. Soon, Raja spots a burkha clad woman and starts following her, only to find that the "woman" is actually Rana. Rana tells Raja that he will not let the latter spend the rest of his life without him. Raja relents and goes home with his friend.

== Cast ==
- Ashok Kumar as Raja
- Saira Banu as Rekha
- Navin Nischol as Kumar
- Pran as Rana Ramlal Chauhan
- Anwar Hussain as Seth Durgadas
- Ranjeet as Bandit
- Mohan Choti as Hospital Wardboy
- Anoop Kumar as Havaldar Murli
- Chaman Puri as Rekha's Father
- Gayatri as Munni, Rekha's Younger Sister
- M. B. Shetty as Shetty
- Rajesh Khera as Karan
- Jagdish Raj as Ranjit
- Jankidas as Seth
- V Gopal as Mantel Bagger
- Helen (actress)
- Meena Rai as Meena
- Pratima Devi as beggar old lady

== Soundtrack ==
#	Title	Singer(s)
1	"Tu Na Mile To Ham Jogi Ban Jayenge"	Kishore Kumar
2	"Dekha Main Ne Dekha"	Kishore Kumar
3	"Do Bechare Bin Sahare"	Kishore Kumar, Mahendra Kapoor
4	"Thoda Sa Thahro"	Lata Mangeshkar
