= Yakeen (1969 film) =

- Theatrical release poster
- Directed by: Brij Sadanah
- Screenplay by: Deven Verma
- Dialogues by: Javed Akhtar; Deven Verma
- Story by: Navaratna Films (Story Department)
- Produced by: Deven Verma
- Starring: Dharmendra; Sharmila Tagore
- Cinematography: Anwar Siraj
- Edited by: Hrishikesh Mukherjee
- Music by: Shankar–Jaikishan
- Production company: Navaratna Films
- Distributed by: NH Studioz
- Release date: 25 July 1969
- Country: India
- Language: Hindi

Yakeen is an Indian action thriller film directed by Brij Sadanah released in 1969. The movie stars Dharmendra and Sharmila Tagore. Dharmendra appears in a double role where one character plays the role of villain in the movie. The supporting cast includes David and M. B. Shetty. The music composed is by Shankar–Jaikishan.

== Plot ==
Rajesh is a scientist. He is injured following the instructions of Dr. Sharma in a secret experiment and granted leave. Rajesh lives with his dog, cook Bhola. He is in love with Rita. Rajesh goes to meet Rita and asks for her hand from her mother, who agrees. He finds his things spread on the bed on returning to his hotel room. Shetty fools Bhola and takes pictures of Rajesh's house. Sharma calls him during his leave. He meets Sharma, but is surprised to know that Sharma did not call him. He and Sharma quarrel when he asks for leave to marry. Rajesh reaches the office after being called by Sharma, but finds him murdered. Rajesh goes to call the police and returns with them to find the body missing. Intelligence chief Mr Roy and his assistant Mr. D'Mello ask Rajesh to take the murder blame of Sharma, so that the miscreants after Sharma's research can be caught. Roy devises an escape plan for Rajesh, but it goes wrong and Rajesh is kidnapped by Shetty and taken to Mozambique. Rajesh is imprisoned, and a look-alike named Garson is sent to India. Garson has blue eyes and a voice different from Rajesh's. Garson uses contact lenses and gets a throat operation to portray Rajesh's voice. His unconscious body is found in an Indian sea. Rita accepts him as Rajesh, although she has some misgivings after he touches the feet of another lady instead of Rita's mother. Rita is pregnant with Rajesh's baby. Garson is given a similar mole as Rajesh. Rajesh's dog and cook realize what has happened, so Garson kills them to avoid their exposing him. The authorities are also less trusting. Will Garson be caught out or not and end up marrying the pregnant Rita? Will Rajesh manage to escape and make it back to India to expose and kill Garson?

== Cast ==
- Dharmendra in a dual role as
  - Rajesh
  - Garson
- Sharmila Tagore as Rita (Rajesh’s girlfriend and later wife)
- David Abraham as Mr. Roy
- Kamini Kaushal as Rita's mother
- Anwar Hussain as Mr. D'Mello
- Asit Sen as Bhola
- Brahm Bhardwaj as Dr. Sharma
- Gautam Mukherjee as Mr. Shrivastava
- Sopariwala as the Chief villain
- Vinod Mehra
- Master Shahid as Billu
- Neelam
- M. B. Shetty as Photographer
- Devi Chand
- Harbans Singh
- Sunder (actor) as Grandfather of the guy who found body at the beach
- Moosa
- Mukri as Father of the guy who found body at the beach
- Corrina as Dancer
- Sherry
- Deven Verma as Guy who found body at the beach (uncredited)
- Mohammad Uddin
- Helen as Nightclub performer

== Music and soundtrack ==
The music of the film was composed by Shankar–Jaikishan and the lyrics of the songs were penned by Hasrat Jaipuri.

| No. | Title | Singer(s) | Length |
|---|---|---|---|
| 1. | "Gar Tum Bhula Na Doge" | Mohammed Rafi |
| 2. | "Bachke Kahan Jaoge" | Asha Bhosle |
| 3. | "Gar Tum Bhula Na Doge" | Lata Mangeshkar |
| 4. | "Baharon Ki Baraat Aa Gayi" | Mohammed Rafi |
| 5. | "Yakeen Karlo Mujhe Mohabbat Hai" | Mohammed Rafi |
