= Punyavathi =

- Theatrical release poster
- Directed by: V. Dada Mirasi
- Written by: D. V. Narasa Raju (dialogues)
- Screenplay by: V. Dadamirasi
- Story by: Dr. Nihar Ranjan Gupta
- Based on: Nai Roshni (1967)
- Produced by: Vasu Menon
- Starring: N. T. Rama Rao; Krishna Kumari; Shobhan Babu
- Cinematography: Jagirdar
- Edited by: K. Narayanan; K. Sankunni
- Music by: Ghantasala
- Production company: Vasu Studios
- Release date: 3 November 1967
- Running time: 148 mins
- Country: India
- Language: Telugu

Punyavathi is a 1967 Telugu-language drama film produced by Vasu Menon under the Vasu Studios banner and directed by V. Dada Mirasi. It stars N. T. Rama Rao, Krishna Kumari, and Shobhan Babu, with music composed by Ghantasala. It is a remake of the Bengali film Taposhi (1965).

== Plot ==
Professor Krishna Rao is an academic who lives with his wife, Padmavati, and their children, Shekar and Chitra. Krishna Rao remains distant from his family. Padmavati prefers a modern lifestyle and raises Chitra to follow suit. Feeling neglected, Shekar becomes an alcoholic. The only person who keeps the family together is Shanti, Krishna Rao's foster daughter. She is affectionate toward everyone, and Shekar is particularly fond of her.

Prakash, a new lecturer living with his blind mother Parvati, works with Krishna Rao on his thesis and falls in love with Shanti. Tensions rise in the Rao household when Padmavati misunderstands the bond between Shekar and Shanti, causing Shekar to leave home. Meanwhile, Chitra is seduced by Ramesh, the son of Judge Lakshmana Rao, and becomes pregnant.

Padmavati realizes the consequences of her choices and regrets her parenting. Shanti informs Shekar of the situation, and he confronts Ramesh. Judge Lakshmana Rao discovers the truth, reprimands his son, and arranges for Ramesh to marry Chitra. However, the intervention comes too late; Chitra consumes poison and Ramesh marries her moments before she dies.

The tragedy impacts the family deeply. Shekar reforms and returns to support his parents. Later, Prakash discovers that Krishna Rao is his biological father who had abandoned his mother, Parvati. He resents him for this betrayal. When Krishna Rao learns the truth, he asks to meet Parvati, but Prakash refuses.

Krishna Rao collapses and explains his past to Shekar. He reveals that he married Parvati in his youth but abandoned her when she lost her eyesight, unaware that she was pregnant. Shekar intervenes and brings Parvati to the house, reuniting the family. The film ends with the marriage of Prakash and Shanti.

== Cast ==
- N. T. Rama Rao as Prakash
- Krishna Kumari as Shanti
- Shobhan Babu as Shekar
- S. V. Ranga Rao as Professor Krishna Rao
- Bhanumathi Ramakrishna as Padmavathi
- V. Nagayya as Judge Lakshmana Rao
- Haranath as Ramesh
- Allu Ramalingaiah
- K. V. Chalam
- Pandari Bai as Parvathi
- Jyothi Lakshmi as Chitra
- Radha Kumari

== Soundtrack ==
Punyavathi

Film score by Ghantasala
- Released: 1967
- Genre: Soundtrack
- Length: 18:55
- Producer: Ghantasala

Ghantasala chronology
Bhuvana Sundari Katha (1967)	Punyavathi (1967)	Rahasyam (1967)

Music composed by Ghantasala. Lyrics were written by C. Narayana Reddy.

S. No.	Song title	Singers	length
1	"Bhale Bagundi"	P. Susheela	3:17
2	"Enta Sogasuga Unnavu"	Ghantasala, P. Susheela	3:24
3	"Pedavulapaina Sangeetam"	Ghantasala	2:08
4	"Manasu Padindi"	Ghantasala, P. Susheela	3:32
5	"Inthele Nirupedalu"	Ghantasala	3:45
6	"Unnava O Deva"	P. Susheela	2:49
