= Chori Mera Kaam =

1975 Indian film

- DVD cover
- Directed by: Brij Sadanah
- Written by: K A Narayan
- Produced by: Chander Sadanah
- Starring: Ashok Kumar; Shashi Kapoor; Zeenat Aman; Pran
- Cinematography: Anwar Siraj
- Edited by: Waman Rao
- Music by: Kalyanji-Anandji
- Release date: 2 May 1975
- Country: India
- Language: Hindi

Chori Mera Kaam (English: Stealing is my Job) is a 1975 Bollywood comedy film, produced by Chander Sadanah, directed by Brij Sadanah and written by K. A. Narayan. The film stars Ashok Kumar, Shashi Kapoor, Zeenat Aman, Pran, Deven Verma, Iftekhar and Raza Murad. The film's music is by Kalyanji-Anandji. Deven Verma won his first Filmfare Award for Best Comedian for the film.

== Cast ==
- Ashok Kumar as Shankar
- Shashi Kapoor as Bholanath "Bhola"
- Zeenat Aman as Sharmili
- Pran as Inspector Kumar / Shera
- Asha Potdar as Wife of Inspector Kumar
- Deven Verma as Parvin Chandra Shah
- Raza Murad as Inspector Shyam
- Iftekhar as Police Commissioner
- David as John
- Anwar Hussain as Amarchand Rathod
- Urmila Bhatt as Parvati Rathod
- M. B. Shetty as Shetty
- Marutirao Parab as D'souza
- Chaman Puri as Shambhu, Sharmili's Father
- Jankidas as Auctioneer
- Anoop Kumar as Police Constable
- Soopariwala as Judge
- Kedarnath Sehgal as Jailor
- Komila Wirk as lady reporter
- Harbans Darshan M. Arora as doctor

== Soundtrack ==
All lyrics were penned by Verma Malik.

Kishore Kumar and Asha Bhosle supplied vocals for Kapoor and Aman, respectively, for all songs but one – "Main Kachche Angoor Ki Bel" – in which Kishore sang for his elder brother Ashok Kumar, while Kishore's son Amit Kumar sang for Kapoor.

Song	Singer
"Main Kachche Angoor Ki Bel, Aayi Karne Dilon Ka Mel, Mera Pyar Hai Awara"	Kishore Kumar, Amit Kumar, Kanchan
"Chori Mera Kaam Yaaron, Chori Mera Kaam"	Kishore Kumar, Asha Bhosle
"Kaahe Ko, Kaahe Ko Mere Peechhe Padi Hai"	Kishore Kumar, Asha Bhosle
"Meri Nazar Se Bacha Na Koi, Kaise Tu Bach Payega"	Kishore Kumar

== Awards ==
- 23rd Filmfare Best Comedian Award for Deven Verma
