= Ek Nai Paheli =

1984 film by K. Balachander

- Promotional poster
- Directed by: K. Balachander
- Written by: K. Balachander; Inter Raj Anand (Dialogue)
- Produced by: P. Subba Rao
- Starring: Raaj Kumar; Hema Malini; Kamal Haasan; Padmini Kohlapure
- Cinematography: B. S. Lokanath
- Edited by: N. R. Kittu
- Music by: Laxmikant–Pyarelal
- Production company: P.S.R. Pictures
- Release date: 29 June 1984
- Country: India
- Language: Hindi

Ek Nai Paheli (transl. A New Riddle) is a 1984 Hindi-language film directed by K. Balachander, starring Raaj Kumar, Hema Malini, Kamal Haasan, Padmini Kohlapure in the lead roles. It is a remake of the Tamil film Apoorva Raagangal by the same director.

== Plot ==
Upendranath, a widower, lives a wealthy life. His son Sandeep is a headstrong and stubborn young man. Sandeep leaves his dad's house to make his own life.

He meets a beautiful older woman Bhairavi who is a singer. Love develops between Bhairavi and Sandeep and they plan to marry. Avinash, Bhairavi's long lost boyfriend and father of her teenage daughter Kajri's arrival creates more conflicts. Kajri lives with the much older Upendranath and they plan to marry as well.

== Cast ==
- Raaj Kumar as Upendranath
- Hema Malini as Bhairavi
- Kamal Haasan as Sandeep
- Padmini Kolhapure as Kajri
- Suresh Oberoi as Avinash
- Mehmood as Dr. Suri
- Asha Sachdev as Jeet Kumari
- Rakesh Bedi as Guest Appearance
- Johnny Lever as Guest Appearance

== Songs ==
The music was composed by Laxmikant–Pyarelal.

Song	Singer
"Zindagi Ke Is Safar"	K. J. Yesudas
"Is Man Ko Ek Thes"	Lata Mangeshkar
"Yeh Preet Aisi Paheli Sadiyon Purani"	Lata Mangeshkar, Kavita Krishnamurthy
"Janoon Tori Batiyan"	Anuradha Paudwal
"Meri Mehbooba Se"	S. P. Balasubrahmanyam
"Kuch Na Kuch"	Asha Bhosle
