= Taqdeer (1983 film) =

- Directed by: Brij
- Produced by: Brij
- Starring: Mithun Chakraborty; Hema Malini; Zeenat Aman; Shatrughan Sinha
- Cinematography: Kishore Rege
- Music by: Kalyanji-Anandji
- Release date: 4 February 1983
- Running time: 125 minutes
- Country: India
- Language: Hindi
- Budget: Rs 14 million
- Box office: 24.5 million tickets (Soviet Union)

Taqdeer (transl. Destiny) is a 1983 Indian Hindi-language film directed by Brij Sadanah, starring Mithun Chakraborty, Shatrughan Sinha, Hema Malini and Zeenat Aman in lead roles.

== Cast ==
- Shatrughan Sinha as Shiva
- Hema Malini as Chandni
- Mithun Chakraborty as Vikram Singh
- Zeenat Aman as Nisha
- Ranjeet as Ranveer Singh
- Raza Murad as Abdul
- Ramesh Deo as Randhir Singh
- Seema Deo as Seema Singh

== Box office ==
The film was a hit in India in 1983 and also enjoyed success overseas in the Soviet Union, where it was released in 1985, because of Mithun's fan base there. The film sold 24.5 million tickets in the Soviet Union.

== Music ==
Lyrics were written by Indeevar and Music was by Kalyanji-Anandji

Song	Singer
"Kyun Aise Dekha Aap Ne"	Kishore Kumar
"Ya Ali Ya Ali"	Kishore Kumar, Mahendra Kapoor
"Aisa Waisa Koi Mujhe" – 1	Asha Bhosle
"Aisa Waisa Koi Mujhe" – 2	Asha Bhosle
"Main Mastani Diljani"	Asha Bhosle
"Maa Sherawaliye, O Ambe Jagdambe Maa Sherawaliye"	Alka Yagnik, Purushottam Upadhyay
