= Bombay 405 Miles =

- Directed by: Brij
- Written by: Kader Khan
- Screenplay by: K.A. Narayan
- Produced by: Brij
- Starring: Vinod Khanna; Shatrughan Sinha; Zeenat Aman
- Music by: Kalyanji-Anandji
- Release date: 2 May 1980 (India)
- Running time: 2 hours 44 min
- Country: India
- Language: Hindi

Bombay 405 Miles is a 1980 Indian Bollywood action drama film produced and directed by Brij Sadanah. It stars Vinod Khanna, Shatrughan Sinha and Zeenat Aman in pivotal roles. It was released on 2 May 1980.

== Plot ==
Ordered to stay away from Delhi and Calcutta's border for five years, two convicts, Kishan and Kanhaiya, decide to go to Bombay which is 405 miles from the border, hence the title. While on a train, they come to the rescue of an elderly male with a female child, Munni. On his last breath, the elderly male asks them to take care of Munni as millions of rupees are involved. Greed overtakes both and they take the child with them in order to locate her next of kin. Unable to find anyone they advertise in the newspapers, and is contacted by Veer Singh, who answered the advertisement. What Kishan and Kanhaiya does not know is that officially Munni is already dead, along with her mother, and brother, purportedly killed by their father, Ranvir Singh, when he suspected his wife's fidelity, a plan executed by Veer Singh, Ranbir Singh's step brother. Kishan and Kanhaiya find themselves immersed in a web of lies and deceit as they try to fathom what the truth really is. But before they could get to the bottom of this matter, their lives themselves are under threat - by a man who will stop at nothing to get what he wants.

== Cast ==
| Actor | Role | Other |
|---|---|---|
| Vinod Khanna | Kanhaiya | A Conman |
| Shatrughan Sinha | Kishan | A Conman |
| Zeenat Aman | Radha | Kanhaiya's Love Interest |
| Pran | Master Ji | |
| Iftekhar | Ranveer Singh | Munni's Father |
| Amjad Khan | Veer Singh | Ranveer Singh's foster brother |
| Helen | Rita | Master Ji's Wife |
| Deven Verma | Girdharilal Pawa | A Barbar |
| Manmauji | The bald man at barbar shop | |
| Bhagwan Dada | Photographer | |
| Birbal | Seth | |
| Mac Mohan | Mac | Veer Singh's Henchman |
| Sudhir | Sudhir | Veer Singh's Henchman |
| Murad | Judge at Delhi Court | |
| Raza Murad | Inspector Ram | |
| Chaman Puri | Mohan Lal | |
| Shammi | Shammi | |

== Notable incidents ==
During the making of the film, a stunt double for Shatrughan Sinha named Mansoor died accidentally. He had to jump across fire, but he fell into the fire and died. M. B. Shetty who was the composer of this scene thought he was responsible for Mansoor's death. He became an alcoholic, and died because of liver failure.

== Soundtrack ==
Lyrics: Indeevar

| Song | Singer |
|---|---|
| "De De De Zara, Hamen De De Zara Manzoori" | Kishore Kumar, Mahendra Kapoor |
| "Kasam Na Lo Koi Humse, Kasam Na Hum Koi Khayenge" | Kishore Kumar, Asha Bhosle |
| "Ho Gaye Hum Aapke, Kasam Se, Kasam Se, Kasam Se" | Asha Bhosle, Mohammed Rafi |
| "Kya Karoon, Kya Karoon" | Lata Mangeshkar |
| "Yeh Kya Karne Lage Ho" | Hemlata |
