= Ustaad =

Ustaad may refer to:

- Ustad, an honorific, meaning "master" or "craftsman", in several Asian languages
- Ustaad (1989 film), an Indian Hindi-language film
- Ustaad (1999 film), an Indian Malayalam-language film
- Ustaad (2023 film), an Indian Telugu-language film

== See also ==
- Ustadon Ke Ustad (disambiguation)
