= Nai Roshni (1967 film) =

- Poster
- Directed by: C. V. Sridhar
- Story by: Nihar Ranjan Gupta
- Produced by: Vasu Menon
- Starring: Ashok Kumar; Raaj Kumar; Biswajeet; Mala Sinha; Tanuja
- Music by: Ravi
- Release date: 1967
- Country: India
- Language: Hindi

Nai Roshni (transl. New Light) is a 1967 Bollywood film starring Ashok Kumar, Raaj Kumar, Biswajeet, Mala Sinha, Tanuja in lead roles. It is a remake of Bengali film Taposhi (1965).

It was also made in Tamil by the same producer, under the name Poovum Pottum and in Telugu as Punyavathi.

== Plot ==
The film is a social drama, with its plot around university professor Dr. Kumar (Ashok Kumar), who lives with his wife Padma (Bhanumathi), his drunkard son Jyoti (Raaj Kumar), outgoing daughter Chitra (Tanuja) and his friend's daughter Rekha (Mala Sinha). Dr Kumar and his wife have a different outlook towards life, with him preferring books and philosophy, while his wife Padma prefers social gatherings and society clubs. Padma never considered Jyoti her son, who works as a mill designer, a profession she considers too poor to acknowledge. Chitra is encouraged by her mother to mingle freely in high society, much to the disappointment of her worried father.

Rekha prefers tending to her father at home, apart from studying. Prakash (Biswajeet), who lives with his blind mother (Sulochana), joins the university as a lecturer, and takes lessons from Dr Kumar to work on his PhD. Rekha and Prakash like each other. Meanwhile, Jyoti, who had taken to drinking to avoid the loneliness of being neglected and insulted by his mother, is thrown out of the house by her. Chitra is attracted to Judge Kailashnath's son Ramesh, a philanderer, who promised to marry her, got her pregnant and then moved on to another girl.

Jyoti and Professor Kumar try to get Chitra and Ramesh married, to avoid humiliation for Chitra. But it is too late as Chitra consumes poison.

It is also revealed that Prakash's father, who had left his blind and pregnant mother, is none other than Professor Kumar. Prakash always hated his father for leaving his mother, and struggles to believe that the teacher he reveres led a deceitful life. How the problems are resolved forms the story.

== Cast ==
- Ashok Kumar as Professor Kumar
- Raaj Kumar as Jyoti
- Biswajeet as Prakash
- Mala Sinha as Rekha
- Tanuja as Chitra
- P. Bhanumathi as Padma
- Sulochana Latkar as Parvati
- Asit Sen as Moti
- Anwar Hussain as Ramzan
- Sailesh Kumar as Ramesh
- Pahari Sanyal as Judge Kailashnath
- Chaman Puri as Principal
- Pratima Devi as Prakash's Grandmother

== Songs ==
Soundtrack was composed by Ravi.

Song	Singer
"Jitni Likhi Thi"	Mohammed Rafi
"Kis Tarah Jeete Hain"	Mohammed Rafi
"Gareebon Ka Jeena Bhi"	Mohammed Rafi
"Teri Aankh Ka Jo Ishaara"	Mohammed Rafi
"Sapne Hai Sapne"	Lata Mangeshkar
"Main Gunahgaar Hoon, Jo Chahe Sazaa Do Mujhko"	Lata Mangeshkar, Mahendra Kapoor
"Tohfa Tumhare Pyar Ka"	Asha Bhosle
