= Night in London =

- Directed by: Brij
- Written by: Omar Khayam (story); Ramesh Pant (screenplay)
- Starring: Biswajeet; Mala Sinha; Johnny Walker; Helen
- Music by: Laxmikant–Pyarelal
- Release date: 1967
- Country: India
- Language: Hindi

Night in London is a 1967 Indian Hindi-language film directed by Brij. It stars Biswajeet, Mala Sinha, Johnny Walker, Helen in pivotal roles. The music was composed by Laxmikant-Pyarelal.

== Plot ==
A woman named Renu (Mala Sinha) is forced to lead a life of crime as her dad is being held hostage by the underworld. She eventually joins with a suspected criminal Jeevan (Biswajeet), both fall in love with each other, and team up against the bad guys.

== Cast ==
- Biswajeet as Jeevan
- Mala Sinha as Renu
- Johnny Walker as Bahadur Singh
- Helen as Sue
- Anwar Hussain as Colonel Fuji
- M. B. Shetty as Shetty
- Sopariwala as His Lordship in London
- Madhumati as Cabret dancer

== Soundtrack ==
The music was composed by the duo Laxmikant-Pyarelal.

Song	Singer
"Mera Naam Hai Jameela"	Lata Mangeshkar
"Sun Ae Bahar-E-Husn Mujhe Tumse Pyar Hai"	Lata Mangeshkar, Mahendra Kapoor
"Baag Mein Phool Kisne Khilaye Hai"	Lata Mangeshkar, Mohammed Rafi
"Night in London, Night in London"	Lata Mangeshkar, Mohammed Rafi
"O Mere Yaar Tommy"	Mohammed Rafi
"Bahosh-O-Hawaas Mein"	Mohammed Rafi
"Nazar Na Lag Jaye"	Mohammed Rafi
