= Mahaveera (film) =

- Directed by: Naresh Saigal
- Written by: Naresh Saigal
- Produced by: Ratan Mohan
- Starring: Raaj Kumar; Dharmendra; Shatrughan Sinha; Raj Babbar; Dimple Kapadia
- Cinematography: Ramachandra
- Edited by: Padmakar Nirbhavane
- Music by: Kalyanji-Anandji
- Production company: R. M. Art Productions
- Distributed by: KS Enterprises
- Release date: 15 July 1988
- Country: India
- Language: Hindi

Mahaveera is a 1988 Indian Hindi-language film, directed by Naresh Saigal and starring Raaj Kumar, Dharmendra, Shatrughan Sinha, Raj Babbar, Dimple Kapadia in pivotal roles.

== Story ==
Dharam is a poor farmer, who lives in rural India with his family consisting of his pregnant wife, a son, Deepak alias Deepu. The lecherous and cunning Thakur Amrit Singh would like to take over Dharam's cultivated plot of land but he refuses to give up this land and is knifed to death by the Thakur with his wife giving birth to a daughter, Dolly in the process. Due to the poverty of the family both brother and sister are unable to afford an education so Dolly decides to take up employment as a maid in Thakur Sher Singh mansion in order to send Deepu abroad to take police training. In the mean-while Sher Singh attempts to sexually molest Dolly but her luck hold out and she run off with a bandit, Diler Singh only to become an outlaw - not only to evade her poverty but to avenge the austerities mediate out to her and her family. When Deepu return as a police officer his first assignment is to arrest his sister much to his shock as he had never associate his sister of having any connection with unlawful activities.

== Cast ==
- Raaj Kumar as DSP Karamveer / Don (Double Role)
- Dharmendra as Inspector Ajay Verma
- Shatrughan Sinha as Vijay Verma
- Raj Babbar as Inspector Deepak
- Dimple Kapadia as Dolly
- Dara Singh as Daku Diler Singh
- Prem Chopra as Thakur Sher Singh
- Raza Murad as Thakur Amrit Singh
- Utpal Dutt as Lala Karamdas
- Vinod Mehra as Dharam
- Anita Raj as Dancer / Singer
- Salma Agha as Dancer / Singer

== Soundtrack ==
| Song | Singer |
|---|---|
| "Kachchiyan Kaliyan Na Tod" | Asha Bhosle |
| "Is Bairan Taqdeer Ko" | Asha Bhosle |
| "O Sherawaliye" | Mohammed Aziz |
| "Teri Nahin, Meri Nahin, Fariyad Hai Yeh Hazaaron Ki" | Mahendra Kapoor, Amit Kumar |
| "Mujhe Tukar Tukar Na Dekh" | Sadhana Sargam |
| "Wafa Se Chala Hai Mohabbat Ka Naam" | Raaj Kumar, Salma Agha |
