= Mardon Wali Baat =

Mardonwali Baat
- Poster
- Directed by: Brij
- Produced by: Brij
- Starring: Dharmendra; Shabana Azmi; Sanjay Dutt; Jaya Prada
- Music by: R. D. Burman
- Release date: 22 January 1988
- Country: India
- Language: Hindi

Mardonwali Baat is a 1988 Bollywood action film directed and produced by Brij, with the starcast Dharmendra, Shabana Azmi, Sanjay Dutt, Jaya Prada in lead roles. The music was composed by R. D. Burman. It is the final film of director Brij. This was the first film where Dharmendra and Shabana Azmi were romantically paired opposite each other, though they had previously acted together in some films. It was a hit according to the makers, said to be last hit film of director Brij.

== Plot ==
Yadvinder Singh and Tinku are career criminals in Mumbai, who work separately. One day, they receive a letter from a blackmailer, who claims that there is an evidence that can send them to jail for a long time unless and until they go to a village named Kashipur to meet a mysterious woman Seema and protect a boy named Rahul (who is Seema’s nephew) and other villagers from being killed by a gang of bandits led by Raja Sunder Singh. With the fear of being apprehended by the police, the duo decide to follow the blackmailer's instructions. They travel to Kashipur and tell the villagers that they are police officers in casuals sent to protect them against bandits. The simple-minded villagers accept this explanation, and both are accepted into the community. They find out that Rahul knows of a truck that contains millions of rupees of arms and ammunition, and it is for this reason that Raja Sunder Singh has been threatening them.

== Cast ==
- Dharmendra as Yadvindar Singh
- Sanjay Dutt as Tinku
- Shabana Azmi as Seema
- Jaya Prada as Asha
- Deven Verma as Chhaila
- Danny Denzongpa as Raja Sundar Singh
- Jugal Hansraj as Rahul
- Pinchoo Kapoor as Surajmal
- Priti Sapru as Ketki
- Satish Kaul as Inspector Deepak

== Music ==
Song	Singer
"O Sajan Beet Na Jaye Saawan"	S. P. Balasubrahmanyam, Asha Bhosle
"Nasha Husn Ka"	Asha Bhosle, Suresh Wadkar
"No Problem"	Asha Bhosle
"Mardonwali Baat"	Asha Bhosle
