= Dharam Kanta =

1982 film

- Theatrical release poster
- Directed by: Sultan Ahmed
- Written by: Kader Khan (dialogues); Majrooh (lyrics)
- Screenplay by: Bharat B. Bhalla
- Story by: Bharat B. Bhalla
- Produced by: Sultan Ahmed
- Starring: Raaj Kumar; Waheeda Rehman; Jeetendra; Rajesh Khanna; Reena Roy; Sulakshana Pandit
- Cinematography: R. D. Mathur
- Edited by: M. S. Shinde
- Music by: Naushad
- Production company: Sultan Productions
- Release date: 1982
- Running time: 148 minutes
- Country: India
- Language: Hindi

Dharam Kanta (transl. Balance of Piety) is a 1982 Hindi-language action film, produced and directed by Sultan Ahmed under the Sultan Productions banner.

It stars Raaj Kumar, Waheeda Rehman, Jeetendra, Rajesh Khanna, Reena Roy, Sulakshana Pandit, Amjad Khan in the pivotal roles and music composed by Naushad.

The movie was a 'hit' on its release and completed its silver jubilee at the cinemas.

== Plot ==
Thakur Bhavani Singh heads a gang of dacoits, who have spread terror and fear in the region. Bhavani has a family, consisting of his wife, Radha, and two sons, Ram and Laxman, and a daughter named Ganga. One day, Bhavani kidnaps the son of wealthy Harnam Singh and will release him for a hefty ransom. Harnam agrees to all the conditions, and hands over the money to Bhavani. Unfortunately, Harnam's child is killed, and his wife, devastated, curses Bhavani and his family. Subsequently, Bhavani is separated from his family due to heavy rains and floods, and decides to turn himself into the police, and is sent to prison. His wife has been unable to locate any of their children. Ram and Laxman are taken in by two bandits and turn to a life of crime, and ironically Ganga is adopted by Harnam Singh. Years later, Bhavani is released from prison, and comes to meet his wife, and is devastated to know that he may never get to see his children again. Bhavani starts living an honest life, not knowing that his estranged sons are leading a life of crime and that his daughter is now living with the family, whose son he killed.

== Cast ==
- Raaj Kumar as Thakur Bhavani Singh
- Waheeda Rehman as Thakurain Radha Singh
- Jeetendra as Laxman Singh / Shiva
- Rajesh Khanna as Ram Singh / Shankar
- Reena Roy as Bijli
- Sulakshana Pandit as Chanda
- Heena Kausar as Ganga Singh
- Amjad Khan as Chandan Singh / Jwala Singh (Double Role)
- Satyendra Kapoor as Thakur Harnam Singh
- Purnima as Mrs. Harnam Singh
- Gajanan Jagirdar as Mukhiya
- Om Prakash as Fakira
- Nazir Hussain as Priest
- Mukri as Shiva's Foster Father
- Nisar Ahmad Ansari as Jailor

== Soundtrack ==
All songs composed by Naushad and all lyrics by Majrooh:

Song	Singer
"Teri Meri Hai Nazar Qatil Ki"	Asha Bhosle
"Ghunghroo Toot Gaye"	Asha Bhosle
"Yeh Gotedaar Lahenga Nikloon Jab Daalke"	Mohammed Rafi, Asha Bhosle
"Tera Naam Liya, Dil Thaam Liya"	Mohammed Rafi, Asha Bhosle
"Duniya Chhute, Yaar Na Chhute" (Duet)	Mohammed Rafi, Bhupinder Singh
"Duniya Chhute, Yaar Na Chhute" (Solo)	Bhupinder Singh
