= Jayshree Arora =

Indian actress

- Born: Jayshree Arora; Kolkata, West Bengal, India
- Occupation: Actress
- Years active: 1984–present

Jayshree Arora (also spelled Joyshree or Jayshri) is an Indian film, stage and television actress, and a trained dancer of Kathak and Manipuri dance. She starred in the first Indian TV serial Hum Log, which began in 1984 and has since performed in over 160 works.

== Filmography ==
=== Television ===
Year	Work	Role	Language	Notes
1984–1985	Hum Log	Bhagwanti	Hindi	
1986-1987	Buniyaad	Nivedita's(Natasha Sinha) Mother	Hindi	
1988	Dil Dariya	Shah Rukh Khan's mother	Hindi	
1988	Fauji	Abhimanyu's mother	Hindi	
1989	Doosra Keval	Mrs Ahluwalia	Hindi	
2007–2008	Jhoome Jiiya Re	Dadi	Hindi	
2009	Mere Ghar Aayi Ek Nanhi Pari	Guneeta Ramlal Chawla	Hindi	
2009–2010	Yahaan Main Ghar Ghar Kheli	Saraswati Devi Prasad	Hindi	
2012–2014	Sapne Suhane Ladakpan Ke	Kabir's grandmother	Hindi	
2016	Diya Aur Baati Hum	Resham Daadi	Hindi	
2017	Dev - TV series	Zohra Rizvi	Hindi	
2026	Sayoneee	Indira	Hindi	

=== Films ===
Year	Work	Role	Language	Notes
1989	Mujrim		Hindi	
1989	Daata		Hindi	
1990	Police Public		Hindi	
1994	Zid		Hindi	
1995	Jai Vikraanta		Hindi	
2007	Chak De! India	Kabir's mother	Hindi	
2008	Drona		Hindi	
2010	Mission 11 July		Hindi	
