= Itihaas (1987 film) =

- Directed by: Joshiy
- Written by: Gyandev Agnihotri (screenplay); Krishan Dehlvi (dialogue)
- Produced by: Tito; Navjeevan Productions
- Starring: Raaj Kumar; Shabana Azmi; Anil Kapoor; Rati Agnihotri; Mohnish Behl; Suresh Oberoi; Danny Denzongpa
- Cinematography: Jal Mistry
- Edited by: Waman Bhonsle; Gurudutt Shirali
- Music by: R. D. Burman
- Distributed by: Navjeevan Productions
- Release date: 27 March 1987
- Country: India
- Language: Hindi

Itihaas (translated as "History") is a 1987 Hindi film directed by Joshiy, it stars Raaj Kumar, Shabana Azmi, Anil Kapoor, Rati Agnihotri, Mohnish Behl, Suresh Oberoi and Danny Denzongpa. This film was a remake of the Malayalam film Ithihasam, also directed by Joshiy in 1981.

== Plot ==
Joginder Singh is an honest and dedicated Police Commissioner. He and his wife Sunaina have two sons, Vijay and Rakesh and a daughter Jyoti. One day, Rakesh arrests Kalicharan, henchman of underworld kingpin Alexander. He is disturbed when he learns of Kalicharan's release after his son's appeal. As if this was not enough, Alexander himself is trapped by police, and the anger against Singh reaches its climax. Alexander goes free on bail and abducts and molests Jyoti. When Singh is informed by Kalicharan's son about the tragedy, he kills a man at the scene of tragedy thinking him to be responsible.

== Cast ==
- Raaj Kumar as Police Commissioner Joginder Singh
- Shabana Azmi as Sunaina Singh
- Anil Kapoor as Advocate Vijay Singh
- Rati Agnihotri as Shobha
- Mohnish Behl as Inspector Rakesh Singh
- Suresh Oberoi as Kalicharan
- Danny Denzongpa as Alexander
- Iftekhar as Senior Police Officer Shyamlal Khurana
- Dinesh Hingoo as Bihari
- Prema Narayan as Khursheed
- Leena Das as Dancer

== Music ==
Lyrics: Anand Bakshi

Song	Singer
"Aao Tumhe Pyar Kare"	K. J. Yesudas, Kavita Krishnamurthy
"Champa Chameli"	Shabbir Kumar
"Dilruba O Dilruba"	Asha Bhosle, Shabbir Kumar
"Mausam Awara"	Asha Bhosle, Suresh Wadkar
"Shabba Khair"	Asha Bhosle
