= Pyaar Ka Rishta =

- Directed by: Sultan Ahmed
- Starring: Vinod Khanna; Shatrughan Sinha; Mumtaz
- Music by: Shankar Jaikishan
- Release date: 1973
- Running time: 137 minutes
- Country: India
- Language: Hindi

Pyaar Ka Rishta is a 1973 Indian Bollywood film directed by Sultan Ahmed. It stars Vinod Khanna, Shatrughan Sinha and Mumtaz in pivotal roles.

== Cast ==
- Vinod Khanna as Anil
- Sameer Khan as Raju
- Mumtaz as Madhu
- Shatrughan Sinha as Dharamdas (Munimji)
- Balraj Sahni as Ashok
- Nirupa Roy as Radha
- Johnny Walker as Lachho
- Mallika as Rani
- Jayshree T. as Flory
- Randhir as Bhagwandas (Dharamdas' Father)
- Chaman Puri as Bihari
- Nadira as Kamla

== Soundtrack ==
This movie probably marked the first occasion when lyricist Shakeel Badayuni wrote songs for a film which had music composed by Shankar Jaikishan. Indeevar was the other lyricist of the film.

Song	Singer
"Aansoo Ko Paseene Mein Badlo"	Mohammed Rafi
"Dekho Dil Na Kisi Ka Toote" (Part 1)	Mohammed Rafi
"Dekho Dil Na Kisi Ka Toote" (Part 2)	Mohammed Rafi
"Dekho Dil Na Kisi Ka Toote" (Part 3)	Mohammed Rafi
"Haay Haay, Dukhi Jaaye Mori Kamariya"	Asha Bhosle
"Mera Naam Hai Flory"	Asha Bhosle, Sharda
"O Nakhrewali Aaja Aaja"	Kishore Kumar, Asha Bhosle
