= Keshav Ginde =

Dr. Pt. Keshav Ginde
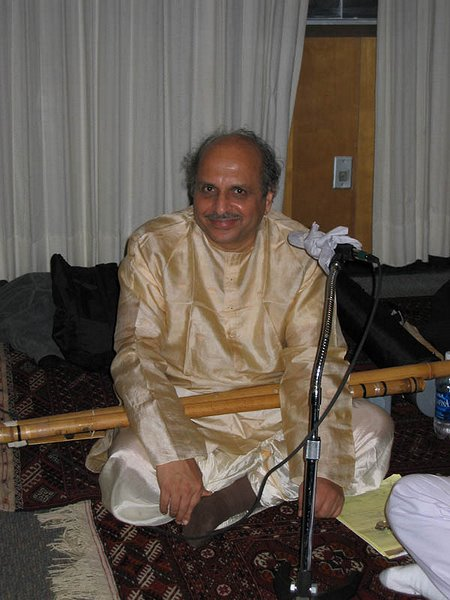
- Dr. Pt. Keshav Ginde

Background information
- Born: September 5, 1942 (age 83); Belgaum, Karnataka, India
- Genres: Hindustani classical music
- Occupations: Flutist, composer
- Instrument: Bansuri
- Website: keshavginde-perfectflute.org

Keshav Ginde (born 5 September 1942) is an Indian classical flutist.

== Qualifications ==
1. B.E. (Mech), A.M.I.I.E (Ind. Eng)
2. Senior Fellowship - Conferred by Cultural Ministry (Govt. of India)
3. Doctorate in Music - From S.F. Pune University, Pune. [Subject - Fundamental Principles of Flute Design]

== Education in flute ==
1. Initial training from Pt. Narayanrao Borakar
2. Advance training under direct disciples of Pt. Pannalal Ghosh, Pt. Haripad Chaudhary and Pt. Devendra Murdeshwar

== Maestro - flute performance ==
1. International fame - Flute / Keshav Venu
2. Top Grade Artist of AIR(All India Radio) & TV
3. Performing for last 5 decades since 1970 on AIR & TV with numerous national programs along with "Aakashwani Sangeet Sammelan"
4. Public performance all over India and abroad for last 4 decades.

== Role as innovator ==
1. Innovated new creative flute - Keshav Venu surpassing the limitations of existing flutes since Vedic Age i.e. 10000 years ago.
2. Recognized as the only bamboo flute with 3.5 (+) octaves range (43 notes) in Limca Book of Records, Edition 1998.
3. R&D Department of Guinness Book of World Records has certified for its uniqueness.
4. Keshav Venu gives additional maximum 18 nos. of notes at the disposal of flautist maintaining appropriate continuity of notes by use of single flute, alternatively many flutes used by other flautists.
5. Received stupendous response from general public, critics of music, musicians & flute maestros. This is "Mark" flute of the bygone 20th century and is the lighthouse for the next generation.
6. Keshav Venu is preserved in Sangeet Natak Akademi, New Delhi. Innovated Anumandra- Murali / Shri Krishna Murli (Madhav Venu) range 2 octaves which can be played 4 notes below mandra shadja i.e. Laraj Saptak
7. Innovated Anahat Venu 12 ft. long (for Laraj Saptak) & Chaitanya venu 1 in. long (for high twitter octave) - both are recognized by Limca Book of Records on the name of his disciple Azaruddin Sheikh.

== Publications & books ==
For world-wide propagation, publicity and enlightenment of Indian Flute -

1. Venu Vigyan - In Marathi Language - honoured by Maharashtra Govt.
2. Venu Ved - In Hindi Language (ebook available on bookganga.com)
3. Venu Vedh - in English Language (ebook available on official website)
4. Venu Vedh - Basic principles of flute design (Thesis of Doctorate)

== Special interviews ==
1. Doordarshan - Mumbai, Ahmedabad & Delhi and CPC Delhi
2. Aakashvani - Pune & Vividh Bharti, Mumbai
3. Press -
  1. The Times of India,
  2. Indian Express,
  3. Hindustan Times,
  4. Punjab Kesari,
  5. Maharashtra Herald,
  6. Sakal, Lokasatta,
  7. Kesari,
  8. Tarun Bharat
4. Public - in India and Abroad at many places
5. Radio - Huston (Texas) U.S.A.

== Awards conferred ==
1. Venu Vidwan - conferred by Jagadguru Shankaracharya, Shringeri Peeth (Karnataka)
2. Senior Fellowship Award granted by Cultural Ministry, Govt. of India
3. National Award bestowed by FIE - Foundation of Ichalkaranji, Maharashtra
4. Life Time Achievement Award given by Sahara Pariwar, Lucknow (UP) for Valuable contribution in field of music
5. President Award to the film "Bai" for its music direction
6. Maharashtra Ratna Bhushan Award - Mumbai
7. Eminent Citizen Award - Pune Municipal Corporation (PMC)
8. Award of Excellence bestowed by Kannada Vrinda, Texas, U.S.A.
9. Award for Overwhelming Performance conferred by Society of Greater Huston, TX, 77043, U.S.A.
10. Award given by Rotary Club, Pune
11. "Bharat Ratna Pandit Bhimsen Joshi Classical Music Lifetime Achievement Award" given by Cultural Ministry, Govt. of Maharashtra
