= Anokhi Ada (1973 film) =

- Poster
- Directed by: Kundan Kumar
- Written by: Rafi Ajmeri; Vishwanath Pande (dialogues)
- Screenplay by: Mushtaq Jalili; K.K. Shukla
- Story by: Mushtaq Jalili
- Produced by: Kundan Kumar
- Starring: Jeetendra; Rekha; Vinod Khanna
- Cinematography: V. Durga Prasad
- Edited by: Kamlakar Karkhanis
- Music by: Laxmikant–Pyarelal
- Production companies: Kundan Films; B4U Entertainment; Eros Entertainment
- Distributed by: Asha Studios; Ranjit Studios; Roop Tara Studios; Shree Sound Studios
- Release date: 20 April 1973
- Running time: 118 minutes
- Country: India
- Language: Hindi

Anokhi Ada (transl. Unique style) is a 1973 Indian Hindi-language film produced and directed by Kundan Kumar. The film stars Jeetendra, Rekha and Vinod Khanna, with music composed by Laxmikant–Pyarelal.

== Cast ==
- Jeetendra as Rakesh / Kishan
- Rekha as Neeta Gupta
- Vinod Khanna as Gopal
- Padma Khanna as Radhika
- Mehmood as Dr. Captain Bhushan
- Jeevan as Khushiram
- Nazir Hussain as Lalaji
- Manmohan Krishna as Mr. Gupta
- Praveen Paul as Mrs. Kamla Gupta
- Kanhaiyalal as Ram Prasad "Ramu"
- Manmohan as Shambhu
- Brahmachari as Sewakram (Dr. Bhushan's Compounder)
- Sanjana as Rosy (Gopal's Girlfriend)
- Keshav Rana as Govind
- M. B. Shetty as Birju

== Soundtrack ==
Lyricist: Majrooh Sultanpuri

| Song | Singer |
|---|---|
| "Haal Kya Hai Dilon Ka" | Kishore Kumar |
| "Sundari, Aay Haay Sundari" | Kishore Kumar |
| "Tere Dil Mein Zara Si Jagah Agar Mile" | Lata Mangeshkar, Mohammed Rafi |
| "Jawaani Tera Bolbala, Budhape Tera Munh Kaala" | Asha Bhosle, Manna Dey |
| "Gum Gayi, Gum Gayi" | Asha Bhosle |
