= Daata (film) =

1989 film

- VCD cover
- Directed by: Sultan Ahmed
- Written by: Sultan Ahmed; M. Akhtar (dialogues)
- Screenplay by: K. B. Pathak
- Story by: M. Akhtar
- Produced by: Sultan Ahmed
- Starring: Shammi Kapoor; Mithun Chakraborty; Padmini Kolhapure; Suresh Oberoi; Prem Chopra; Ranjeet; Amrish Puri
- Cinematography: R. D. Mathur
- Edited by: Mukhtar Ahmed
- Music by: Kalyanji-Anandji
- Production company: Sultan Productions
- Release date: 30 June 1989
- Running time: 135 minutes
- Country: India
- Language: Hindi

Daata (transl. Giver) is a 1989 Indian Hindi-language action drama film directed and produced by Sultan Ahmed. The film stars Shammi Kapoor, Mithun Chakraborty, Padmini Kolhapure, Suresh Oberoi, Prem Chopra, Ranjeet, Amrish Puri in pivotal roles. The film was a big hit.

== Plot ==
Dinanath is a school-teacher in a small town in India, and lives with his wife, Kamla; daughter, Shanti; and son Kundan. He has published a book called "Daata", in which he has made reference to all major religions of the world, and is honored for this contribution by none other than the President of India through the Education Minister, Raja Suraj Singh. He arranges the marriage of Shanti to the son of Gopaldas; when Gopaldas demands dowry, he is unable to afford this, and states that he has given sufficient gold and jewellery to Shanti. The gold turns out to be fake; as a result, the marriage is cancelled, Shanti kills herself, Dinanath dies of a heart attack. His name is tarnished, no one comes forward to help Kundan or his mother. Kundan decides to avenge his father's death by killing Gopaldas' son; as a result, he becomes a bandit, joins a band of other bandits and is on the look-out to kill Gopaldas. The question remains; is this what Dinanath had foreseen for his son - a life of a bandit, and death at the hands of the police?

== Cast ==
- Shammi Kapoor as DIG Sher Ali Khan
- Mithun Chakraborty as Kundan Singh
- Padmini Kolhapure as Sona
- Suresh Oberoi as Ramzan Khan
- Prem Chopra as Lala Naagraj
- Ranjeet as Natwar Sarang
- Amrish Puri as Gopi / Gopaldas Sarang "G.D."
- Saeed Jaffrey as Master Dinanath Singh
- Jayshree Arora as Kamla Singh
- Pallavi Joshi as Shanti Singh
- Supriya Pathak as Suraiya Khan
- Deepak Parashar as Inspector Rauf Khan
- Bharat Bhushan as Pandit Dwarka Prasad
- Satyendra Kapoor as Barkat Khan
- Shoma Anand as Alka Naagraj
- Arjun as Nahar , Kundan's Friend
- Anil Dhawan as Naresh, Kundan's Friend
- Mac Mohan as Jagmohan, Kundan's Friend
- Mukri as Pandit Ram Prasad
- Birbal as Veeru
- Jamuna as Seema Singh
- Leela Mishra as Jamuna
- Raj Mehra as Jamuna's Husband
- Ashalata Wabgaonkar as Ratna Bai
- Om Shivpuri as Shiksha Mantri Raja Suraj Singh
- Brahm Bhardwaj as School Principal Suresh
- Arun Bakshi as Inspector Vikram Sharma
- Tom Alter as G.D.'s Partner
- Kamal Kapoor as Panna Seth
- Keshav Rana as Dhaniram
- Viju Khote as Thief
- Roopesh Kumar as Sameer, G.D.'s Employee
- Bhushan Tiwari as Chirijanlal , G.D.'s Employee
- Girja Shankar as Bheema

== Music ==
Film song lyrics were written by Anjaan, Indeevar and Asad Bhopali.

1. "Rona Dhona Chhod Chhod De, Hum Se Naata Jodh Jodhde" - Kishore Kumar, Alka Yagnik
2. "Baabul Ka Yeh Ghar Behana" - Kishore Kumar, Alka Yagnik
3. "Baabul Kaa Ye Ghar Behana" (Sad) - Kishore Kumar, Alka Yagnik
4. "Daata Tere Kai Naam, Koi Pukare Kisi Naam Se, Aaye Tu Sabke Kaam" - Mahendra Kapoor, Sadhana Sargam, Manhar Udhas
5. "Naach Mere Lala" - Sapna Mukherjee, Nalin Dave
6. "Holi Khelein Nand Laal, Laal Khele Holi Kanha Ne Mari Aise Pichkari" - Sapna Mukherjee, Nalin Dave
7. "Teri Meri Yaari Yeh Dosti Hamari, Bhagwan Ko Pasand Hai Allah Ko Hai Pyari" - Suresh Wadkar, Mohammed Aziz
8. "Meri Jaan Pyar Karo, Pyar Hi Pyar Karo Pyare" - Asha Bhosle
9. "Daata Tere Kai Naam, Koi Pukare Kisi Naam Se Aaye Tu Sabke Kaam" (version 2) - Mahendra Kapoor, Sadhana Sargam, Manhar Udhas
10. "Daata Tere Kai Naam, Koi Pukare Kisi Naam Se, Aaye Tu Sabke Kaam" (version 2) - Sadhana Sargam, Manhar Udhas

== Box office ==
The film was a blockbuster hit and the fifth highest-grossing movie of 1989.
