= Keshav Samant =

Indian bridge player

Keshav Samant popularly known as Anand Samant is one of India's most successful contract bridge players. He has represented India in the world championships. In 2009, he was part of India's senior team at the 15th Bridge Federation of Asia and the Middle East (BFAME) championship in Amman, Jordan.

== International record ==
=== Playing record (team events) ===
YEAR	Event	Rank	Team
1993	31st WORLD TEAM CHAMPIONSHIPS Santiago 1993 - Open Teams	9	INDIA Open Team
2002	11th WORLD CHAMPIONSHIPS Montreal 2002 - Open Teams	81	RUIA Open Team
2006	12th WORLD CHAMPIONSHIPS Verona 2006 - Open Teams	129	PODDAR Open Team
2010	13th WORLD SERIES CHAMPIONSHIPS Philadelphia 2010 - Open Teams	33	DIPAK PODDAR Open team
2014	14th RED BULL WORLD BRIDGE SERIES Sanya 2014 - Open Teams	77	pc of team PODDAR DEVELOPERS
2017	43rd World Team Championships Lyon 2017 - Senior Teams	4	INDIA Senior Team
2018	15th World Bridge Series Orlando 2018 - Open Teams	89	PODDAR HOUSING Open Team

=== Playing record (pairs or individual events) ===
YEAR	Event	Rank	Team
2002	11th WORLD CHAMPIONSHIPS Montreal 2002 - Open Pairs - Qualifier	174(13)	ASHOK RUIA
2006	12th WORLD CHAMPIONSHIPS Verona 2006 - Open Pairs - Qualifier	237(44)	Dipak Poddar
2010	13th WORLD SERIES CHAMPIONSHIPS Philadelphia 2010 - Open Pairs - Semifinal	122(50)	Ramawatar AGRAWAL
2018	15th World Bridge Series Orlando 2018 - Open Pairs - SemiFinal A	121(71)	Ramawatar AGRAWAL

- Other Team Events Positions

YEAR	Event	Rank	Team
2008	1st WORLD MIND SPORTS GAMES Beijing 2008 - Under-28 Teams	15	npc of India Under-28 team
2008	1st WORLD MIND SPORTS GAMES Beijing 2008 - Junior Teams	18	coach of India Junior team
2009	15th BFAME CHAMPIONSHIPS Amman 2009 - Senior Teams	1	npc of INDIA Senior team
2009	39th WORLD TEAM CHAMPIONSHIPS Sao Paulo 2009 - Senior Teams	14	npc of INDIA Senior team
2018	15th World Bridge Series Orlando 2018 - Open Teams	89	coach of PODDAR HOUSING Open team

Winners

- Shivchatrapati Award by Maharashtra State Government
- Gurudutta Trophy
- Khosla Trophy
- Holkar Trophy
- Tolani Grand Prix
- Agarwal, Sushania National trophies and other trophies

== Member of Bridge Organizations ==
- Hon. Gen. Secretary, Public Information Officer of Bridge Federation of India
- Secretary for Maharashtra Bridge Association for 10 years.
- Founder member of Thane District Bridge Association.
- Committee member of Contract Bridge Association and Bridge Federation of India
