= Ram Bharose =

- Directed by: Anand Sagar
- Written by: Krishan Chander (dialogue)
- Produced by: Subhash Sagar
- Starring: Randhir Kapoor; Rekha
- Music by: Ravindra Jain
- Release date: 21 April 1977
- Country: India
- Language: Hindi

Ram Bharose (transl: By Belief on Lord Rama) is a 1977 Bollywood action comedy film produced by Subhash Sagar and directed by Anand Sagar. The music score was composed by Ravindra Jain.

== Cast ==
- Randhir Kapoor as Rampratap
- Rekha as Kiran
- Amjad Khan as Bhanupratap
- Madan Puri as Boss
- Sujit Kumar as David
- Raza Murad as Shekhar (Kiran's brother)
- Dara Singh as Sardar Vikram Singh (CBI Agent No. 1007)
- Kanan Kaushal as Kamal (Bhanupratap's wife)
- Nazir Hussain as Ratanchand
- Tom Alter as Tom
- M. B. Shetty as Jaggu

== Music ==
Music is composed by Ravindra Jain who also wrote the songs, along with fellow lyricists Hasrat Jaipuri, Tajdar Taj and Dev Kohli.

Song	Singer	Lyricist
"Chalo Bhai Ram Bharose"	Kishore Kumar	Ravindra Jain
"Chal Chal Re Kathmandu"	Kishore Kumar	Hasrat Jaipuri
"Main Loote Hue Pyar Ki Kahani Sunane Aaya Hoon"	Kishore Kumar, Asha Bhosle	Hasrat Jaipuri
"Neend Udegi Teri, Chain Udega"	Mohammed Rafi, Asha Bhosle	Hasrat Jaipuri
"Haan Jee Le Gaya Sajna"	Asha Bhosle	Dev Kohli
"Yaar Ko Apne Dhokha Dekar"	Narendra Chanchal	Tajdar Taj
