= Keshav Dattatreya Nayak =

Indian DRDO scientist

- Education: B.E. in Electronics; Ph.D. in Microelectronics
- Alma mater: University Visvesvaraya College of Engineering, Bangalore University; Indian Institute of Technology Bombay
- Employer: DRDO
- Known for: Defence research
- Title: Former Director-General, DRDO

Keshav Dattatreya Nayak is an Indian DRDO scientist and served as Director General for MED (Microelectronics Devices), CS (Computational Systems) and CS (Cyber-Security). He was superannuated Director-General of DRDO.

== Awards ==
Nayak has been awarded many times for his scientific contributions

- DRDO Award for contribution to Integrated Guided Missile Development Program in 1989.
- IETE-IRSI (83) Award for 1997-98 for outstanding contribution in the field of radar and microwave systems.
- Technology Day Invention Award by National Research Development Corporation.
