= Jai Vikraanta =

- Film Poster
- Directed by: Sultan Ahmed
- Screenplay by: K.B. Pathak
- Story by: M. Akhtar
- Produced by: Sultan Ahmed
- Starring: Sanjay Dutt; Zeba Bakhtiyar; Amrish Puri
- Cinematography: R.D. Mathur
- Edited by: M.S. Shinde
- Music by: Anand–Milind
- Production company: Sultan Productions
- Release date: 24 March 1995
- Running time: 195 minutes
- Country: India
- Language: Hindi

Jai Vikraanta is a 1995 Indian Hindi-language action crime drama film directed and produced by Sultan Ahmed. It stars Sanjay Dutt, Zeba Bakhtiyar and Amrish Puri.

== Plot ==
Choudhary Amar Singh is a farmer in rural India and lives a modest lifestyle with his wife, Sharda, and son, Vikraanta. He excels in sugar cane production and is presented with an award and a tractor by the State Government. He has named his farm after his son, and expects him to continue farming. Amar's efforts are to remove the debts that he and other farmers have incurred from Zamindars. This does not augur well with Thakur Pratap Singh, who arranges Amar's death. This incident turns the lives of Vikraanta and Sharda upside down, compelling Vikraanta to make a commitment to avenge his father's death, not knowing that he himself is placing his own life in jeopardy.

== Cast ==
- Sanjay Dutt as Choudhury Vikraanta Amar Singh
- Alok Nath as Choudhury Amar Singh, father of Vikraanta Singh
- Reema Lagoo as Choudhury Sharda Singh, Mother Of Vikraanta A.Singh
- Zeba Bakhtiar as Choudhury Nirmala "Nimu" Vikraanta Singh; Vikraanta's wife
- Amrish Puri as Thakur Jaswant Singh
- Mukesh Khanna as Thakur Harnam Singh
- Shahbaaz Khan as DIG Sher Ali Khan
- Sabeeha as Zeenat Sher Ali Khan, Sher's wife
- Suresh Oberoi as Raja
- Deepti Naval as Geeta Thakur, Harnam's Wife
- Aruna Irani as Sakina
- Saeed Jaffrey as Police Commissioner Yashpal Nanda; Nimu's father
- Ranjeet as Inspector Khote
- Jayshree Arora as Sheetal Nanda, Nimu's mother
- Mohsin Memon as Choudhury Suraj Vikraanta Singh (Nimu and Vikraanta's Son)

== Soundtrack ==
The film's music was composed by Anand–Milind and the lyrics by Sameer.

#	Title	Singer(s)
1	"Rishta Tera Mera Sabse" (Male)	Pankaj Udhas
2	"Gore Gore Gaal Meri Jaan Ke Dusman"	Poornima
3	"Tere Honton Pe Bansi Shyam Ki"	Sadhana Sargam, Kavita Krishnamurthy
4	"Dekh Ke Mera Khilta Husn-O-Shabab"	Alka Yagnik
5	"Pyar Ikrar Mere Yaar Ho Gaya"	Kumar Sanu, Alka Yagnik
6	"Kothe Upar Kothri"	Alka Yagnik
7	"Rishta Tera Mera" (Female)	Sadhana Sargam
