= Keshav K. Singh =

Indian-American researcher

- Education: Rohilkhand University (BS); G.B. Pant University of Agriculture and Technology (MS); University of Wollongong (PhD)
- Known for: Founding editor-in-chief of the journal Mitochondrion; Coining terms "mystondria", "mystopia", and "mipigenetics"; Research on mitochondrial role in aging and cancer
- Scientific career
- Fields: Genetics, Oncology
- Workplaces: University of Alabama at Birmingham (present); Roswell Park Comprehensive Cancer Center; Johns Hopkins University School of Medicine
- Website: www.keshavsingh.org

Keshav K. Singh is one of the global leaders in the field of mitochondria research and medicine. He is the Joy and Bill Harbert Endowed Chair, Professor of Genetics, Pathology and Environmental Health and the Director of the Cancer Genetics Program at the University of Alabama at Birmingham (UAB). Keshav K. Singh is also the founding editor-in-chief of the journal Mitochondrion., founder of the Mitochondria Research and Medicine Society (USA) and the Society for Mitochondrial Research and Medicine (India)

He is the author of more than 100 research publications and 3 books related to mitochondrial diseases, aging and cancer. He coined the terms "mystondria" or "mystopia" to explain the mysterious diseases of mitochondria and "mipigenetics" to explain the mito-nuclear epigenetic mechanisms underlying mitochondrial diseases.

== Career ==
Keshav K. Singh received his Bachelor of Science from Rohilkhand University, and his Master of Science from G.B. Pant University of Agriculture and Technology, both in India. He obtained his Ph.D. in Australia and did his postdoctoral studies at Harvard University. He then joined Johns Hopkins University School of Medicine as Assistant Professor of Oncology. He moved to Roswell Park Comprehensive Cancer Center, Buffalo, NY as Associate Professor of Oncology. At Roswell Park he rose through the rank to Professor and to Distinguish Professor of Oncology.

Keshav K. Singh serves on several expert panels around the world including the United States, UK, France and Italy. He either has served or serves on the editorial boards of several journals including Molecular Cancer, Technology in Cancer Research and Treatment, Cancer Biology & Therapy and he is the Editor-in-Chief of Mitochondrion.

He has been quoted in Nature, New Scientist, on the web, newspapers and magazines, and has given interviews to radio shows, PBS and Associated Press on Mitochondria stories of public interest. Keshav K. Singh is either serving or has served as an expert reviewer of grants submitted to several entities including the U.S. Department of State, National Institutes of Health (NIH), National Research Council, Canada, National Research Council, France, National Research Council, Poland, United Mitochondrial Disease Foundation and Komen Breast Cancer Foundation, and several other organizations.

== Selected publications ==
- Author of over 100 research publications
- Author or editor of 3 books on mitochondrial diseases, aging and cancer
