= Monagallaku Monagadu =

1966 film by S. D. Lal

- Poster
- Directed by: S. D. Lal
- Written by: L. Balu
- Based on: Ustadon Ke Ustad (Hindi)(1963)
- Produced by: Rama Sundaram
- Starring: S. V. Ranga Rao; Haranath; Prabhakara Reddy; Raavi Kondala Rao; Krishna Kumari; G. Rathna
- Cinematography: S. S. Lal
- Edited by: L. Balu
- Music by: Vedha
- Production company: Modern Theatres
- Release date: 14 January 1966
- Country: India
- Language: Telugu

Monagallaku Monagadu (transl. Expert of all experts) is a 1966 Indian Telugu-language action thriller film directed by S. D. Lal and produced by Rama Sundaram. It is a remake of the Hindi film Ustadon Ke Ustad (1963). The film stars S. V. Ranga Rao, Haranath, Prabhakara Reddy, Raavi Kondala Rao, Krishna Kumari and G. Rathna. It was released on 14 January 1966, and became a commercial success.

== Plot ==
Ramesh, an engineer, impresses Madhava Rao, a businessman, with his plan to build a factory. Madhava Rao's daughter Geetha falls in love with Ramesh. Partners in crime Bhujangam and Mala loot a bank. With some of the looted money, Mala travels in a bus in which Ramesh also happens to be seated. Their suitcases get interchanged, and Ramesh, now suspected of committing the bank robbery, is arrested. To avoid his own arrest, the actual culprit, Bhujangam hires Kathula Rathaiah, an assassin, to kill Ramesh. Geetha had earlier saved Rathaiah, who has since considered her his sister. After learning of her love for Ramesh, he promises to help Ramesh to clear his name. After a few disguises by both Ramesh and Rathaiah and many more incidents, Bhujangam and Mala are brought to justice.

== Cast ==
- S. V. Ranga Rao as Kathula Rathaiah
- Haranath as Ramesh
- Prabhakar Reddy as Bhujangam
- Raavi Kondala Rao as Madhava Rao
- Krishna Kumari as Geetha
- G. Rathna as Mala
- Savitri as a qawwali dancer
- Balayya
- Chalam

== Production ==
After the commercial success of Vallavanukku Vallavan, the Tamil remake of the Hindi film Ustadon Ke Ustad (1963), its producer Rama Sundaram decided to remake the film in Telugu under the same banner, Modern Theatres. S. D. Lal was signed on to direct the remake, titled Monagallaku Monagadu, and his brother S. S. Lal was signed as cinematographer, while Pinisetty wrote the dialogues. L. Balu worked as editor. Savitri, who made a guest appearance as a qawwali dancer in Vallavanukku Vallavan, was chosen to reprise the role in Monagallaku Monagadu.

== Soundtrack ==
The soundtrack was composed by Vedha. The song "Nenunnadi Neelone" is based on "Sau Baar Janam Lenge" from Ustadon Ke Ustad.

Track listing
No.	Title	Lyrics	Singer(s)	Length
1.	"Chusanoi Neelanti"	Kosaraju Raghavaiah	L. R. Eswari, Pithapuram Nageswara Rao
2.	"Thellari"	C. Narayana Reddy	P. Susheela, Madhavapeddi Satyam
3.	"Andhala Bommalaga"	C. Narayana Reddy	P. Susheela, P. B. Sreenivas
4.	"Vachame Nee Kosam"	C. Narayana Reddy	P. Susheela, P. B. Srinivas, Madhavapeddi Satyam, Chorus
5.	"Kannu Chedhiri Poyinadhoi"	Kosaraju Raghavaiah	L. R. Eswari, Pithapuram Nageswara Rao
6.	"Ahaha Chudu Andhamu Chudu"	Kosaraju Raghavaiah	P. B. Sreenivas
7.	"Yevevo Ashalatho"	C. Narayana Reddy	P. B. Sreenivas

== Release and reception ==
Monagallaku Monagadu was released on 14 January 1966, and became a commercial success.
