= Do Musafir =

- Directed by: Devendra Goel
- Produced by: Rabindranath Kumar
- Starring: Ashok Kumar; Shashi Kapoor; Rekha; Prem Chopra; Pran
- Music by: Kalyanji-Anandji
- Release date: 1978
- Country: India
- Language: Hindi

Do Musafir is a 1978 Bollywood film directed by Devendra Goel. The film stars Shashi Kapoor and Rekha, along with Ashok Kumar, Pran & Prem Chopra. The music of the film was composed by Kalyanji-Anandji.

== Cast ==
- Ashok Kumar as Kailashnath
- Shashi Kapoor as Raju / Vicky
- Rekha as Bijli
- Prem Chopra as Avinash Kumar
- Pran as Shambhu Chaudhary
- Jagdeep as Murli
- Meena T. as Bela
- Chandrashekhar as Girdhari
- Manorama as Maya (Bela's Aunty)
- Dulari as Bholi
- Shivraj as Bansi
- Chaman Puri as Bhavani Singh

== Music ==
Kalyanji-Anandji have composed all songs from the film. The song "Hum Hain Pyar Ki Dagar Ke Do Musafir" by Mohammed Rafi and Lata Mangeshkar was a romantic and popular song, picturised on Shashi Kapoor and Rekha. Lyrics were written by Indeevar.

Song	Singer
"Tere Jaisa Sagar Mein Moti Nahin" (Happy)	Kishore Kumar, Anuradha Paudwal
"Tere Jaisa Sagar Mein Moti Nahin" (Sad)	Kishore Kumar
"Kaise Raat Beeti"	Kishore Kumar
"More Saiyan Bhaye Kotwal"	Asha Bhosle
"Hum Hain Pyar Ki Dagar Ke Do Musafir" (Happy)	Mohammed Rafi, Lata Mangeshkar
"Hum Hain Pyar Ki Dagar Ke Do Musafir" (Sad)	Mohammed Rafi, Lata Mangeshkar
