= Phaansi =

Indian hindi Film

- Poster
- Directed by: Harmesh Malhotra
- Starring: Shashi Kapoor; Sulakshana Pandit; Pran; Ranjeet; Jeevan
- Music by: Laxmikant-Pyarelal
- Release date: 9 March 1978
- Country: India
- Language: Hindi

Phaansi (ISO 15919: Phāṁsī ) is a 1978 Indian Hindi-language movie directed by Harmesh Malhotra. The film stars Shashi Kapoor, Sulakshana Pandit, Pran, Iftekhar, Asrani and Ranjeet.

Ranjeet was deeply troubled mentally as he played the most brutal Daaku ever, one who hangs several people to death (hence Phaansi). It is reported that Ranjeet went to Nepal to find peace after shooting for this movie.

The movie was declared a hit due to its story line, drama, songs and great action. The film's music is by Laxmikant Pyarelal The songs were playbacked by Mohd Rafi, Lata Mangeshkar and Sulakshana Pandit.

== Soundtrack ==
| Song | Singer |
|---|---|
| "Bachchiyan, Jawan Te Budhiyan" | Mohammed Rafi |
| "Jab Aati Hogi Yaad Meri" | Mohammed Rafi, Sulakshana Pandit |
| "Mil Jaate Hai Milnewale" | Sulakshana Pandit |
| "Humari Bekaraar Si Nazar" | Lata Mangeshkar |
