= Ek Se Badhkar Ek (1976 film) =

- Directed by: Brij
- Starring: Ashok Kumar; Raaj Kumar; Navin Nischol; Sharmila Tagore
- Music by: Kalyanji-Anandji
- Release date: 1976
- Country: India
- Language: Hindi

Ek Se Badhkar Ek is a 1976 Hindi movie, with action, comedy and drama. The story is about two brothers who were separated and both became thieves. There was big competition between the police and thugs to steal a diamond worth a million. There are suspenses one after another. Finally, the diamond was stolen and it had gone missing from hand to hand, until discovered with much effort by the heroes. Directed by Brij, The film stars Ashok Kumar, Raaj Kumar, Navin Nischol and Sharmila Tagore. The film's music is by Kalyanji-Anandji.

The film was a big hit with it story line. Navin Nischol was at his peak when the movie was made. The role of Raaj Kumar as hero was without a heroine. Sharmila Tagore has proven that she is a multi-talented actress in the movie with her role. Anwar Hussain is the head of thugs with Helen being his lead lady. Ashok Kumar's role in the movie was considered one of his best.

The bhangra song of the movie by Kishore Kumar and Lata Mangeshkar, became very popular. In the movie, Mohammed Rafi and Asha Bhosle have sung a Qawwali for Ashok Kumar and Padma Khanna (in a guest appearance), which was a gem. Some part of the Qawwali and lyrics were used by R. D. Burman in the film Hum Kisise Kum Naheen for the song "Hai Agar Dushman". Due to the success of the movie, it was remade in Telugu as Mugguru Muggure.

== Music ==
Song	Singer
"Aankhon Mein Surma, Paon Mein Payal"	Kishore Kumar, Lata Mangeshkar
"Ek Se Badhkar Ek"	Runa Laila
"Masti Jo Teri Aankhon Mein Hai Woh"	Mohammed Rafi, Asha Bhosle
"Main To Chhudiyon Ki Dhaar Pe Karti Hoon Pyar"	Mohammed Rafi, Asha Bhosle
"Zara Bach Ke"	Mohammed Rafi, Asha Bhosle
