= Ustadon Ke Ustad (1963 film) =

1963 film by Brij Sadanah

- Directed by: Brij
- Starring: Ashok Kumar; Pradeep Kumar; Shakila
- Music by: Ravi
- Release date: 1963

Ustadon Ke Ustad (transl. The expert among all experts) is 1963 Hindi film starring Pradeep Kumar and Shakila in the lead roles. The film was remade in Tamil as Vallavanukku Vallavan (1965), in Telugu as Monagallaku Monagadu (1966) and in Kannada as Bhale Bhaskar (1971).

== Plot ==
An impoverished engineer, Pradeep Kumar, "Dipak", falls in love with a wealthy woman. He eventually gets suspected to be a bank robber. Whilst in the police cell, he is met with dacoit "Mangal Singh", a known thief, who helps to plan their escape from a dodgy window to hand Dipak to a violent gang for Rs5000. However, Dipak explains after his escape to Mangal, that he is in trouble with the police and a vindictive gang of thieves who are trying to kill him because he had identified Helen, the dancing queen who stole a massive amount of cash in a briefcase. Eventually, Dipak makes Mangal unhappy, and diverted his mind as his greed for more money increases for an additional Rs 20,000 more to return him to the leader of the gang. The plan fails. Ashok Kumar follows them to a hiding place where Dipak is locked up by Mangal Singh. Ashok Kumar unlocks the door from outside and enters reluctantly as he identified Mangal approaching the hideout. Despite escaping the violent thief "Mangal Singh", Dipak is left in a dilemma and holds a brief discussion with Johnny Walker, "Babu" - the classic comedian in Hindi Films of the 60s, 70s and Early 80s. Dipak decides to make one more escape with attempted suicide near the waterfall, but just as soon, his lover locates his hideout. The story takes a twist as Ashok Kumar, who everyone thought was a police officer, betrays the trust of Dipak. Mangal, who is befriended by a persuading Dipak's girlfriend, becomes her brother. Mangal, who came to cash in by collecting Dipak, suddenly supports a newly found sister with a rakhi tied on his wrist. There is a funny act, where a qawali mehfil is disturbed by two runaways who fear getting caught by a handful of chasing policeman. The situation becomes volatile in the grand scheme of uncertainty and betrayal experienced by those close to Mangal. Ashok Kumar fixes an appointment for Dipak to meet at 8:00 PM somewhere and mistrusts all concerned parties. Helen is killed as the gang leader manipulates things to meet up with Dipak and Mangal, who wanted Rs50k to hand Dipak to the gang. Ashok Kumar declares his identity after Mangal rejects the cash, stating that the serial numbers are those from a robbery of Rs500k earlier, when Dipak was arrested. Mangal is indeed the real police officer, and both Dipak and he gets caught in a difficult situation in a cave. At that moment, Johnny Walker "Babu" comes to rescue his colleagues with a fireball explosive. Everyone runs to save their lives only to be caught by police outside the cave. Johnny Walker declares that the fireball was indeed an expired Diwali cracker, with no threat to lives. Ashok Kumar flees to escape with Dipak's girlfriend at gunpoint. Both leave hurriedly in a boat as Dipak manages to get in the boat and fights off Ashok Kumar, breaking the steering wheel. The boat goes astray as Ashok Kumar tries to tell the couple to escape for their lives, and the boat explodes, hitting a small island on the sea at a fast speed, killing Ashok Kumar. Dipak weds his girlfriend, and the story has a happy ending.

== Cast ==
- Ashok Kumar as Saaya
- Pradeep Kumar as Dinesh
- Shakila as Nita
- Johnny Walker as Babu
- Helen as Rita
- Sheikh Mukhtar as Mangal Singh
- Anwar Hussain as Jeevan
- Rajan Haksar as Police Inspector

== Soundtrack ==
Asad Bhopali wrote the lyrics and Ravi gave the music for the movie.

Song	Singer
"Sau Baar Janam Lenge"	Mohammed Rafi
"Haseenon Se To Bas"	Mohammed Rafi
"Maine Kaha Tha Aana Sunday Ko"	Mohammed Rafi, Asha Bhosle
"Mere Dil Ko Jiski Talash Thi, Maine Woh Sitamgar Pa Liya"	Mohammed Rafi, Asha Bhosle
"Milte Hi Nazar Tumse Hum Ho Gaye Deewane"	Mohammed Rafi, Asha Bhosle, Manna Dey
"Raat Chup Hai, Chandni Madhosh Hai"	Asha Bhosle, Ravi
