= Jeetendra filmography =

Performances by Indian film actor

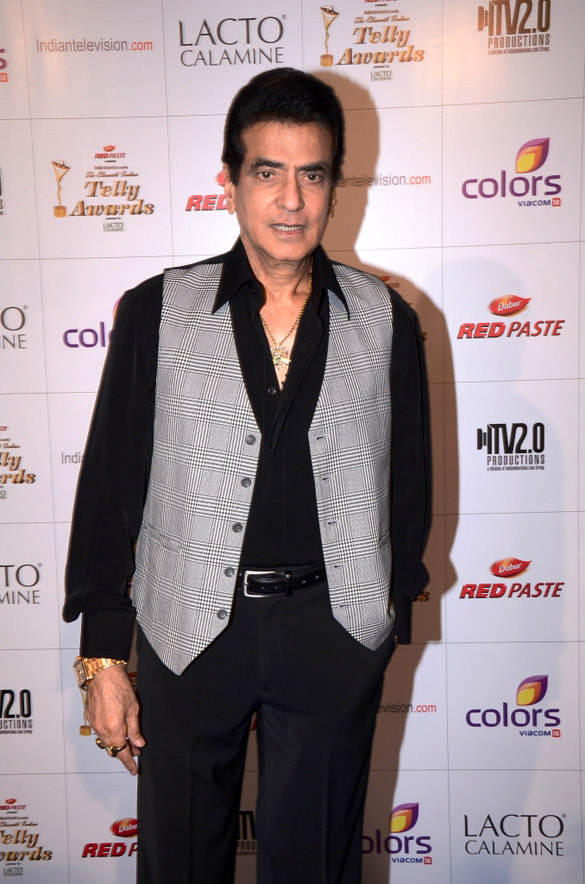
Jeetendra at Colors Indian Telly Awards 2012

The following is a complete list of the filmography of Indian actor Jeetendra.

== 1959 – 1970 ==
Year	Title	Role	Notes	Ref.
1959	Navrang		Debut film	
1963	Sehra	Himself	Cameo appearance	
1964	Geet Gaya Patharon Ne	Vijay		
1967	Gunahon Ka Devta	Kundan		
1967	Boond Jo Ban Gayee Moti	Master Satyaprakash		
1967	Farz	Gopal Kishan Pandey (Agent 116)		
1968	Suhaag Raat	Jeetendra "Jeet"		
1968	Aulad	Arun/ Sohan		
1968	Mere Huzoor	Akhtar Hussain Akhtar	Assistant Director	
1968	Parivar	Gopal		
1969	Dharti Kahe Pukarke	Shiv Kumar "Shiva"		
1969	Do Bhai	Vijay Verma		
1969	Jeene Ki Raah	Mohan		
1969	Badi Didi	Amar		
1969	Jigri Dost	Gopi / Advocate Anand	Dual role	
1969	Anmol Moti	Vijay		
1969	Vishwas	Ravi Kapoor		
1969	Waris	Ram Kumar		
1970	Khilona	Mohan Singh		
1970	Maa Aur Mamta	Ram		
1970	Himmat	Raghu		
1970	Jawab	Raja / Rajkumar		
1970	Humjoli	Rajesh		
1970	Mere Humsafar	Raju "Junglee"		
1970	Naya Raasta	Chander		

== 1971 – 1975 ==
Year	Title	Role	Notes	Ref.
1971	Bikhre Moti	Anand		
1971	Kathputli	Vishal		
1971	Chahat	Arun		
1971	Ek Nari Ek Brahmachari	Mohan Kumar Chaudhary		
1971	Caravan	Mohan		
1972	Banphool	Hariya		
1972	Ek Hasina Do Diwane	Amar		
1972	Ek Bechara	Rajan		
1972	Shaadi Ke Baad	Shyam Ram		
1972	Yaar Mera	Shyam 'Kishan'		
1972	Bhai Ho To Aisa	Bharat Singh		
1972	Parichay	Ravi		
1972	Roop Tera Mastana	Raja Saab / Prince Kumar	Dual role	
1972	Sazaa	Qawwali Singer	Special appearance	
1972	Garam Masala	Jeet	Cameo	
1972	Chori Chori	Himself	Cameo	
1973	Anokhi Ada	Rakesh / Kishan		
1973	Gehri Chaal	Sagar		
1973	Jaise Ko Taisa	Vijay & Vinod Kumar	Dual role	
1974	Bidaai	Sudhakar		
1974	Roti	Himself	Cameo	
1974	Dulhan	Ashok & Vijay (Dual role)		
1975	Khushboo	Dr. Brindaban		
1975	Umar Qaid	Akbar		
1975	Aakhri Daao	Ravi		
1975	Rani Aur Lalpari	Prince		

== 1976 – 1980 ==
Year	Title	Role	Notes	Ref.
1976	Nagin	Nag (Male Serpent)		
1976	Sankoch	Shekhar		
1976	Suntan	Ravi		
1976	Udhar Ka Sindur	Raja / Rajkumar		
1977	Jay Vijay	Prince Jay / Daku Sher Singh		
1977	Dharam Veer	Veer Singh		
1977	Kinara	Inderjeet		
1977	Dildaar	Bankelal		
1977	Ek Hi Raasta	Atin Singh		
1977	Zamaanat	Ravi		
1977	Kasam Khoon Ki	Kishan		
1977	Priyatama	Ravi		
1977	Palkon Ki Chhaon Mein	Ravi The Soldier	Cameo	
1977	Apnapan	Anil Mehra		
1978	Tumhari Kasam	Anand		
1978	Karmayogi	Ajay		
1978	Dil Aur Deewaar	Vijay		
1978	Badaltey Rishtey	Sagar Singh		
1978	Chowki No.11	Jeeten		
1978	Swarag Narak	Mohan 'Vicky' Kapoor		
1978	Nalayak	Laxman		
1978	Sone Ki Lanka	Himself	Cameo	
1979	Aatish	Anand		
1979	Jaandaar	Gul Khan		
1979	Jaani Dushman	Amar		
1979	Love in Canada	Dev		
1979	Khandaan	Ravi		
1979	Hum Tere Aashiq Hain	Anand		
1979	Lok Parlok	Amar		
1979	Naya Bakra	Himself	Cameo	
1979	Aap Ke Deewane	Rocky		
1980	Jal Mahal	Ravi		
1980	The Burning Train	Ravi		
1980	Takkar	Vijay		
1980	Jyoti Bane Jwala	Suraj & Jyothi / Jwala	Dual role	
1980	Judaai	Dr. Shashikant Verma		
1980	Neeyat	Jeet		
1980	Nishana	Raja		
1980	Maang Bharo Sajana	Ram Kumar & Chandra	Dual role	
1980	Aap Ke Deewane	Rocky	Special appearance	
1980	Aasha	Deepak		

== 1981 – 1985 ==
Year	Title	Role	Notes	Ref.
1981	Waqt Ki Deewar	Amar		
1981	Khoon Aur Paani	Rakesh / Rocky / Raka / Laxman		
1981	Dhuan	Ashok Saxena	Special appearance	
1981	Sharda	Inder Malhotra		
1981	Jyothi	Govind		
1981	Khoon Ka Rishta	Ravi		
1981	Pyaasa Sawan	Chandrakanth / Ravi	Dual role	
1981	Ek Hi Bhool	Ramkumar Srivastav		
1981	Mosambi Narangi	Raja "Qawali Singer"	Marathi film	
1981	Shakka	Shakka		
1981	Meri Aawaz Suno	Inspector Sushil Kumar / Kanwarlal (Dual Role)		
1981	Kahani Ek Chor Ki	Ram		
1981	Zamaane Ko Dikhana Hai	Kanchan Tipse's boyfriend	Cameo	
1982	Apna Bana Lo	Master		
1982	Raksha	Gopal Kishan Pandey (Agent-116)		
1982	Chorni	Dr. Vikram Sagar		
1982	Insaan	Ravi		
1982	Badle Ki Aag	Inspector Amar Verma		
1982	Mehndi Rang Layegi	Dr. Ramu		
1982	Farz Aur Kanoon	SP Ranjeet Kumar / Ramu	Dual role	
1982	Lakshmi	Qawwali Singer	Guest appearance	
1982	Deedar-E-Yaar	Nawab Akhtar Nawaz Khan		
1982	Jeeo Aur Jeene Do	Inspector Vijay Singh		
1982	Anokha Bandhan	Haribabu	Special appearance	
1982	Dharam Kanta	Laxman / Shiva		
1982	Samraat	Raju		
1982	Raaste Pyar Ke	Mohan Lal Srivatsav		
1983	Nishaan	Ravi		
1983	Himmatwala	Ravi Murti		
1983	Prem Tapasya	Mohan Kumar Verma		
1983	Arpan	Anil Verma		
1983	Jaani Dost	Veeru		
1983	Justice Chaudhury	R. K. Choudhary / Ramu	Dual role	
1983	Film Hi Film	Himself	Special appearance	
1983	Mawaali	Ramesh / Gangu	Dual role	
1984	Tohfa	Ram		
1984	Yeh Desh	Chandra Mohan Azaad		
1984	Akalmand	Dr. Kiran		
1984	Maqsad	Tilak		
1984	Qaidi	Suraj		
1984	Kaamyab	Ramu / Krishna	Dual role	
1984	Haisiyat	Ram		
1984	Zakhmi Sher	Major Vijay Kumar Singh		
1984	The Gold Medal	Gopal		
1985	Hoshiyar	Rakesh		
1985	Balidaan	Inspector Vijay		
1985	Haqeeqat	Inspector Arjun		
1985	Pataal Bhairavi	Ramu		
1985	Bond 303	Ajay / Agent 303		
1985	Sarfarosh	Jwala Singh / Inspector Suraj Kapoor	Dual role	
1985	Mera Saathi	Ranganath "Ranga"		
1985	Mahaguru	Himself	Cameo in the song "Pyar Ka Khel"	
1985	Sanjog	Narayan		

== 1986 – 1990 ==
Year	Title	Role	Notes	Ref.
1986	Jaal	Chote Thakur Shashipratap		
1986	Dharm Adhikari	Prakash		
1986	Aag Aur Shola	Vishal		
1986	Swarag Se Sunder	Sarpanch Vijay Chowdhary		
1986	Singhasan	Vikram Singh / Aditya Vardhan	Dual role	
1986	Suhaagan	Ram		
1986	Locket	Shankar		
1986	Ghar Sansar	Prakash		
1986	Sadaa Suhagan	Rajshekhar		
1986	Dosti Dushmani	Dr. Sandeep Kumar		
1986	Sahara	Himself	Cameo	
1986	Aisa Pyar Kahan	Sagar		
1987	Apne Apne	Ravi Kapoor		
1987	Majaal	Vijay Kumar		
1987	Aulad	Anand		
1987	Madadgaar	Anand		
1987	Khudgarz	Amar Saxena		
1987	Sindoor	Prem Kapoor	Cameo	
1987	Jaan Hatheli Pe	Ram		
1987	Khazana	Magician		
1987	Himmat Aur Mehanat	Vijay Kumar		
1987	Insaf Ki Pukar	Ajay		
1988	Tamacha	Rajiv Singh "Raju"		
1988	Mulzim	Vijay Kumar		
1988	Kanwarlal	Kanwarlal		
1988	Sone Pe Suhaaga	Vijay Kumar		
1988	Mar Mitenge	Ram		
1988	New Delhi	Vijay Kumar		
1989	Dav Pech	Sikandar & Bajrangi	Dual role	
1989	Asmaan Se Ooncha	Kishan / King		
1989	Nafrat Ki Aandhi	Inspector Ravi Kapoor		
1989	Souten Ki Beti	Dr. Shyam Verma		
1989	Souten Ki Souten		Shelved film	
1989	Kasam Vardi Ki	Inspector Vijay Singh		
1989	Jism Ka Rishta	Himself	Cameo	
1989	Aag Se Khelenge	Inspector Shekhar Kapoor		
1990	Majboor	Adavocate Ravi		
1990	Taqdeer Ka Tamasha	Satya Dev		
1990	Zahreelay	Captain Jaswant Kumar		
1990	Amiri Garibi	Heera		
1990	Hatim Tai	Hatim Tai		
1990	Mera Pati Sirf Mera Hai	Prakash		
1990	Sheshnaag	Pritam Nag (Male Serpent)		
1990	Aaj Ke Shahenshah	Vikram 'Vicky'		
1990	Jai Shiv Shankar	Shiv		
1990	Naya Andaz	Himself	Cameo	
1990	Agneekaal	Vijay		
1990	Nyay Anyay	Judge Ravi Khanna		
1990	Thanedaar	Inspector Avinash Chandar		

== 1991 – 1995 ==
Year	Title	Role	Notes	Ref.
1991	Begunaah	Gautam		
1991	Shiv Ram	Inspector Shiv		
1991	Sapnon Ka Mandir	Sanjay Sharma		
1991	Ranbhoomi	Chandan Singh		
1991	Maa	Ram Khanna		
1992	Insaaf Ki Devi	Inspector Santosh Verma		
1992	Jai Kaali	Advocate Shiv Shankar		
1992	Yeh Raat Phir Na Aayegi	CBI Officer Sunil Malhotra		
1992	Dil Aashna Hai	Prince Arjun Singh		
1992	Sone Ki Lanka	Mohit Sinha		
1992	Rishta To Ho Aisa	Rajesh		
1993	Aaj Kie Aurat	Avinash Kapoor		
1993	Geetanjali	Sagar		
1993	Prateeksha	Vijay Kumar		
1993	Bhookamp	Professor Ajay Saxena		
1993	Rang	Ajay Malhotra		
1993	Aadmi Khilona Hai	Vijay Varma		
1993	Khal-Naaikaa	Ravi Kapoor		
1993	Aasoo Bane Angaarey	Ravi Varma		
1993	Santaan	Sarju Narayan Watchman		
1993	Tahqiqaat	Father Prem Fernandes and SP Arun Kumar (Dual role)		
1994	Chauraha	Inspector Kailash Kumar		
1994	Udhaar Ki Zindagi	Sitaram		
1994	Ghar Ki Izzat	Dr. Sohan Kumar		
1995	Janam Kundli	Ravi Kapoor		
1995	Zamaana Deewana	Madanlal Malhotra		
1995	Hum Sab Chor Hain	ACP Ravi Kumar		
1995	Paappi Devataa	DCP Ram Kumar Singh		
1995	Kalyug Ke Avtaar	Pratap		

== 1996 – present ==
Year	Title	Role	Note(s)	Ref(s)
1996	Dushman Duniya Ka	Mahesh		
1997	Judge Mujrim	Judge Pratap Sinha		
1997	Mahaanta	Commissioner Vijay Kapoor		
1997	Lav Kush	Lord Sriram		
1997	Krishna Arjun	Krishna		
1997	Dharma Karma	Karma / Shiva Kapoor		
1997	Chupp	Rakesh Rai / Ashok		
1999	Mother	Sunil Malik		
2000	Piyo Gayo Pardesh	Himself	Special appearance; Gujarati film	
2001	Jaydev	Inspector Janardhan Poojari		
2003	Kucch To Hai	Ravi Kapoor		
2003	Kyunki Saas Bhi Kabhi Bahu Thi	Jithesh Kothari	Special appearance; TV series	
2003	Kahaani Ghar Ghar Kii	Himself	Special appearance; TV series	
2005	Ho Jaata Hai Pyaar	Ravi Kapoor		
2006	Gabbar Singh	Thakur	Bhojpuri film	
2007	Om Shanti Om	Himself	Special appearance	
2013	Mahabharat Aur Barbareek	Himself	Cameo appearance	
2020	Baarish	Jeetu Bhai	Web series	
2021	Apharan Season 2	Himself	Web series	
2025	Vrusshabha		Telugu film; special appearance	
