= List of Hindi films of 1980 =

This is a list of films released by India's Bollywood Hindi language film industry in 1980.

== Successful stars of the year ==
1. Amitabh Bachchan- With starring roles in hits like Ram Balram, Dostana and Shaan. Bachchan continued solidifying his megastar status.

2. Dharmendra- Apart from starring with Bachchan in Ram Balram, Dharmendra starred in Ali Baba Aur 40 Chor and The Burning Train.

3. Jeetendra- He had an extremely successful year, with hits like Jyoti Bane Jwala, Aasha, Maang Bharo Sajana, Judaai along with the multistarrer The Burning Train.

4. Vinod Khanna- Khanna starred in the top-grossing Qurbani with Feroz Khan and The Burning Train with Dharmendra and Jeetendra.

5. Shatrughan Sinha- Sinha played second fiddle to Bachchan in Shaan and Dostana.

6. Tina Munim got her breakthrough with the most anticipated movie, Karz. She also starred in Man Pasand which was moderately successful.

7. Zeenat Aman- The most successful actress of the year, Aman starred as the female lead in three of the top five highest grossers of the year- Qurbani, Ram Balram and Dostana. She also played a supporting role in Ali Baba Aur 40 Chor.

8. Rekha- She acted opposite Bachchan in Ram Balram, and featured opposite Jeetendra in Judaai.

9. Hema Malini- She was paired with her husband Dharmendra in The Burning Train and Ali Baba Aur 40 Chor.

== Highest-grossing films ==
The ten highest-grossing films at the Indian box office in 1980:

Rank	Title	Gross collection
1	Qurbani	₹12 crore
2	Aasha	₹10 crore
3	Ram Balram	₹9.5 crore
4	Dostana	₹9 crore
5	Shaan	₹8.5 crore
6	Jyoti Bane Jwala	₹7 crore
7	The Burning Train	₹6.5 crore
8	Ali Baba Aur 40 Chor	₹6 crore
9	Karz	₹5.5 crore
10	Judaai	₹5 crore

== Films ==
Title	Director	Cast	Genre	Sources
Aakrosh	Govind Nihalani	Naseeruddin Shah, Smita Patil, Amrish Puri	Drama, Mystery, Thriller	
Aanchal	Anil Ganguly	Rajesh Khanna, Raakhee, Rekha	Action, Family, Drama, Comedy	
Aap Ke Deewane	Surendra Mohan	Rishi Kapoor, Rakesh Roshan, Tina Munim, Shoma Anand, Pran, Ranjeet, Jeetendra	Romance	
Aap To Aise Na The	Ambrish Sangal	Raj Babbar, Ranjeeta Kaur, Deepak Parashar	Romance, Drama, Family	
Aasha	J. Om Prakash	Jeetendra, Reena Roy, Talluri Rameshwari	Drama, Family, Musical, Romance	
Abdullah	Sanjay Khan	Raj Kapoor, Sanjay Khan, Sanjeev Kumar, Zeenat Aman, Parveen Babi	Action, Drama, Family	
Abhimanyu	Mahesh Bhatt			
Agent 009		Vijendra Mittal, Rehana Sultan, Madhushala, Padma Khanna	Action	
Agreement	Anil Ganguly	Rekha, Utpal Dutt, Shailendra Singh	Musical, Comedy, Drama, Family	
Akhri Insaaf	Kalidas	Mithun Chakraborty, Vijayendra Ghatge, Ashok Kumar	Action	
Albert Pinto Ko Gussa Kyoon Aata Hai	Saeed Akhtar Mirza	Naseeruddin Shah, Shabana Azmi, Smita Patil	Comedy, Drama, Romance	
Alibaba Aur 40 Chor	Latif Faiziyev, Umesh Mehra	Dharmendra, Hema Malini, Zeenat Aman, Mac Mohan	Action, Adventure, Family, Romance	
Ambe Maa Jagdambe Maa	Sukhdev Ahluwalia	Lata Arora, Yogesh Chhabra, Surjeet Kaur	History, Comedy, Drama, Family	
Angaar	Ashok Roy	Jayshree T., Yogeeta Bali, Kiran Kumar	Suspense	
Apne Paraye	Basu Chatterji	Shabana Azmi, Amol Palekar, Girish Karnad	Drama, Family, Comedy	
Arising from the Surface	Mani Kaul	Bharat Gopi, M. K. Raina	Compilation	
Badla Aur Balidan	Kawal Sharma	Rajendra Kumar, Vinod Mehra, Asha Parekh		
Badrinath Dham	Ashish Kumar	Lalita Pawar		
Bakhe Kadam	K. Shivram	Joginder Shelly, Sunder, Shakti Kapoor	Drama	
Bambai Ka Maharaja	Shibu Mitra	Shakti Kapoor, Kulbhushan Kharbanda, Raj Kiran		
Bandish	K. Bapaiah	Rajesh Khanna, Hema Malini, Danny Denzongpa	Action, Crime, Drama, Romance	
Be-Reham	R. Jhalani	Brahm Bhardwaj, Urmila Bhatt, Moushumi Chatterjee		
Beqasoor	B.P. Harisinghaney	Vikas Anand, Vijay Arora, Master Bhagwan	Action, Crime, Drama, Thriller	
Bhumi Par Aaye Bhagwan	Ravi	Lokesh, Lakshmi, Jai Jagdish	Action, Drama, Fantasy	
Bin Maa Ke Bachche	Satyen Bose	Bindu, Master Bittoo, Leela Chitnis		
Kala Pani (Black Water)	Shibu Mitra	Shashi Kapoor, Neetu Singh, Ajit Khan, Amjad Khan, Raza Murad		
Bombay 405 Miles	Brij Sadanah	Zeenat Aman, Vinod Khanna, Shatrughan Sinha, Pran	Comedy, Action	
Chaal Baaz	Hari Mehra	Deepak Khanna, Jaya Kausalya, Nadira	Action	
Chambal Ki Kasam	Ram Maheshwary	Pradeep Kumar, Raaj Kumar, Shatrughan Sinha	Action, Crime	
Choron Ki Baaraat	Harmesh Malhotra	Shatrughan Sinha, Neetu Singh, Ajit Khan	Action	
Chunaoti	Satpal	Feroz Khan, Neetu Singh, Danny Denzongpa	Action, Thriller	
Desh Drohi	Prakash Mehra	Saira Banu, Padma Khanna, Keshto Mukherjee, Pran	Action	
Dhamaka	Jagdesh	Kiran Kumar, Raza Murad, Sarika		
Dhan Daulat	Harish Shah	Rishi Kapoor, Neetu Singh, Pran, Premnath, Kader Khan, Prem Chopra		
Do Aur Do Paanch	Rakesh Kumar	Shashi Kapoor, Amitabh Bachchan, Hema Malini, Parveen Babi, Kader Khan	Action, Comedy, Drama, Musical, Romance	
Do Premee	Raj Khosla	Rishi Kapoor, Moushumi Chatterjee, Om Prakash	Romance	
Do Shatru	Kewal Misra	Shatrughan Sinha, Sharmila Tagore, Anil Dhawan, Sujit Kumar, Aruna Irani		
Door Waadiyon Mein Kahin	Kishore Kumar	Kishore Kumar		
Dostana	Raj Khosla	Amitabh Bachchan, Shatrughan Sinha, Zeenat Aman, Pran, Prem Chopra, Amrish Puri		
Ek Baar Kaho	Lekh Tandon	Navin Nischol, Shabana Azmi, Kiran Vairale, Dilip Dhawan, Madan Puri, Rajendra Nath	Romance, Family, Drama	
Ek Baar Phir	Vinod Pande	Suresh Oberoi, Deepti Naval, Pradeep Verma	Drama	
Ek Do Teen Chaar	Vijay Anand	Dev Anand, Parveen Babi, Dharmendra	Action	
Ek Gunah Aur Sahi	Yogi Kathuria	Sunil Dutt, Parveen Babi		
Ganga Aur Suraj	A. Salaam	Sunil Dutt, Shashi Kapoor, Reena Roy		
Ganga Dham	B. S. Thapa	Raj Mehra, Nameeta Chandra, Arun Govil, Shakti Kapoor	Action	
Gehrayee	Arunavikas, Arunavikas	Shreeram Lagoo, Anant Nag, Indrani Mukherjee	Horror	
Garam Khoon	A. Saalam	Vinod Khanna, Sulakshana Pandit, Helen	Action	
Guest House	Shyam Ramsay, Tulsi Ramsay	Prem Krishan, Padmini Kapila, Vijayendra Ghatge	Horror	
Gunehgaar	Rahul Rawail	Parveen Babi, Rishi Kapoor, Rajendra Kumar		
Hum Nahin Sudherenge	Asrani	Asrani, Rita Bhaduri, Keshto Mukherjee		
Humkadam	Anil Ganguly	Raakhee, Parikshat Sahni, Biswajeet	Musical, Drama, Family	
Hum Paanch	Bapu	Sanjeev Kumar, Shabana Azmi, Mithun Chakraborty, Naseeruddin Shah, Raj Babbar, Gulshan Grover, Amrish Puri	Family, Action	
Insaf Ka Tarazu	B.R. Chopra	Zeenat Aman, Raj Babbar, Deepak Parashar, Padmini Kolhapure	Drama, Crime, Family	
Jaaye To Jaaye Kahan		Prema Narayan, Sachin		
Jal Mahal	R. Jhalani	Jeetendra, Rekha, Deven Verma, Pran	Fantasy	
Jazbaat	Suraj Prakash	Raj Babbar, Zarina Wahab	Romance, Drama	
Judaai	T. Rama Rao	Ashok Kumar, Jeetendra, Rekha	Family, Drama	
Jwalamukhi	Prakash Mehra	Waheeda Rehman, Shatrughan Sinha, Reena Roy, Vinod Mehra, Shabana Azmi, Pran	Action, Romance, Drama, Family	
Jyoti Bane Jwala	Dasari Narayana Rao	Jeetendra, Vinod Mehra, Ashok Kumar, Waheeda Rehman, Moushumi Chatterjee	Action, Drama, Family	
Kali Ghata	Ved Rahi	Shashi Kapoor, Rekha, Danny Denzongpa	Thriller, Mystery, Romance	
Kasturi	Bimal Dutta	Agha, Mithun Chakraborty, Arvind Deshpande	Drama	
Khanjar	Atma Ram	Navin Nischol, Reena Roy, Amjad Khan	Action, Thriller	
Karz	Subhash Ghai	Rishi Kapoor, Tina Munim, Simi Garewal, Prem Nath, Pran, Mac Mohan	Musical	
Khoon Kharaba	Deepak Bahry	Pradeep Kumar, Vinod Mehra, Bindiya Goswami, Paintal		
Khubsoorat	Hrishikesh Mukherjee	Ashok Kumar, Rekha, Rakesh Roshan	Comedy, Drama, Family	
Khwab	Shakti Samanta	Ashok Kumar, Ranjeeta Kaur, Naseeruddin Shah, Mithun Chakraborty, Yogeeta Bali	Crime, Drama, Romance	
Kismet	Bhisham Kohli	Mithun Chakraborty, Ranjeeta Kaur, Shakti Kapoor	Action, Family, Musical	
Lahu Pukarega	Akthar -Ul-Iman	Saira Banu, Feroz Khan, Bindu, Sunil Dutt, Amjad Khan	Action	
Lootmaar	Dev Anand	Dev Anand, Tina Munim, Mehmood Ali, Nirupa Roy, Raakhee, Amjad Khan, Prem Chopra, Shakti Kapoor, Ranjeet	Action, Thriller	
Maan Abhiman	Hiren Nag	Raj Kiran, Kavita Kiran, Yunus Parvez	Drama, Family	
Maang Bharo Sajana	T. Rama Rao	Jeetendra, Rekha, Moushumi Chatterjee	Drama	
Mahashakti	K. S. Giri	Narasimha Raju, Madhavi, Jayamalini		
Man Pasand	Basu Chatterjee	Dev Anand, Tina Munim, Girish Karnad	Comedy, Drama, Family	
Manokaamnaa	Kedar Kapoor	Urmila Bhatt, Shail Chaturvedi, Kalpana Iyer	Drama, Romance	
Morchha	Ravikant Nagaich	Aruna, Ravi Behl, Chandrashekhar		
Nazrana Pyar Ka	S. M. Sagar	Raj Babbar, Master Bhagwan, Brahm Bhardwaj	Drama	
Neeyat	Anil Ganguly	Shashi Kapoor, Jeetendra, Rekha	Family, Drama	
Nishana	K. Raghavendra Rao	Asrani, Prem Chopra, Mohan Choti	Action	
Oh Bewafa	Saawan Kumar Tak	Rajendra Kumar, Anil Dhawan, Yogeeta Bali	Drama, Romance	
Patita	I. V. Sasi	Shoma Anand, Vikram, Raj Kiran		
Patthar Se Takkar	Gulab Mehta	Master Bhagwan, Urmila Bhatt, Birbal, Pran	Action, Crime, Thriller	
Payal Ki Jhankaar	Satyan Bose	Alankar Joshi, Komal Mahuvakar, Surinder Kaur	Romance	
Phir Wahi Raat	Danny Denzongpa	Rajesh Khanna, Kim, Danny Denzongpa	Crime, Horror, Mystery	
Pyaara Dushman	Anand Sagar	Rakesh Roshan, Vidya Sinha, Yogeeta Bali	Action	
Qatil Kaun	Amit Bose	Sameer Khan, Nanda, Rita Bakshi, Ranjeet		
Qurbani	Feroz Khan	Feroz Khan, Vinod Khanna, Zeenat Aman, Amjad Khan, Shakti Kapoor, Mac Mohan, Kader Khan	Romance	
Raksha Bandhan	Shantilal Soni	Lalita Pawar, Sachin, Sarika		
Ram Balram	Vijay Anand	Dharmendra, Amitabh Bachchan, Zeenat Aman, Rekha, Ajit Khan, Amjad Khan, Prem Chopra, Helen	Action	
Red Rose	Bharathi Rajaa	Rajesh Khanna, Poonam Dhillon, Aruna Irani	Adventure, Crime, Musical, Romance, Thriller	
Saajan Mere Main Saajan Ki	Hiren Nag	Raj Babbar, Kaajal Kiran, Raj Kiran		
Saboot	Shyam Ramsay, Tulsi Ramsay	Navin Nischol, Vidya Sinha, Kaajal Kiran	Thriller	
Sanjh Ki Bela	Madhusudan	Nutan, Joy Mukherjee, Rehman	Romance	
Satah Se Uthata Aadmi	Mani Kaul	Gopi, Vibhuti Jha, Satyen Kumar	Compilation	
Sau Din Saas Ke	Vijay Sadanah	Ashok Kumar, Raj Babbar, Reena Roy, Asha Parekh	Drama	
Shaan	Ramesh Sippy	Sunil Dutt, Shashi Kapoor, Amitabh Bachchan, Shatrughan Sinha, Kulbhushan Kharbanda, Rakhee Gulzar, Parveen Babi, Bindiya Goswami, Johnny Walker, Mac Mohan	Action	
Shadi Se Pahale	Karunesh Thakur	Rajesh Khanna, Dheeraj Kumar, Raj Mehra, Parveen Sod Rajendra Nath	Drama	
Shiv Shakti		Dara Singh, Ramesh Deo, Jayshree T.		
Sitara	Meraj	Mithun Chakraborty, Zarina Wahab, Kanhaiyalal	Drama, Family	
Sparsh	Sai Paranjpye	Shabana Azmi, Naseeruddin Shah, Sudha Chopra	Drama	
Swayamvar	P. Sambasiva Rao	Shashi Kapoor, Sanjeev Kumar, Moushumi Chatterjee, Vidya Sinha	Drama, Family, Action, Comedy	
Takkar	K. Bapaiah	Sanjeev Kumar, Jeetendra, Zeenat Aman, Jaya Prada	Action	
Taxi Chor	Sushil Vyas	Mithun Chakraborty, Zarina Wahab, Raj Mehra	Action	
Teen Ekkey	Jogender Sehlley	Helen, Kiran Kumar, Rita Haksar, Laxmi Chahya Rajendra Nath		
The Burning Train	Ravi Chopra	Dharmendra, Hema Malini, Vinod Khanna, Parveen Babi, Jeetendra, Neetu Singh, Vinod Mehra, Danny Denzongpa	Action	
The Naxalites	Khwaja Ahmad Abbas	Jalal Agha, Mithun Chakraborty, Bijaya Jena	Drama	
Thodisi Bewafaii	Esmayeel Shroff	Rajesh Khanna, Shabana Azmi, Padmini Kolhapure	Drama, Family	
Trilok Sundari	Singeetham Srinivasa Rao	Mohan Babu, Pandharibai		
Unees-Bees	Swaroop Kumar	Yogeeta Bali, Rita Bhaduri, Mithun Chakraborty		
Yari Dushmani	Sikandar Khanna	Sunil Dutt, Reena Roy, Amjad Khan		
Yeh Kaisa Insaf?	Narayana Rao Dasari	Vinod Mehra, Shabana Azmi, Sarika	Drama	
Zakhmon Ke Nishan	Diljeet Bassi	Vijay Arora, Vinod Mehra, Purnima, Aruna Irani	Action	
Zalim	B. Subhash	Leena Chandavarkar, Vinod Khanna, Nirupa Roy, Pran		

== See also ==
- List of Hindi films of 1979
- List of Hindi films of 1981
