= 28th Filmfare Awards =

1981 awards for Hindi cinema

- Date: 1981
- Site: Bombay

Highlights
- Best Film: Khubsoorat
- Best Actor: Naseeruddin Shah for Aakrosh
- Best Actress: Rekha for Khubsoorat
- Most awards: Aakrosh (6)
- Most nominations: Insaaf Ka Tarazu & Thodisi Bewafaii (9)

The 28th Filmfare Awards for Hindi cinema were held in Bombay in 1981.

Insaaf Ka Tarazu and Thodisi Bewafaii led the ceremony with 9 nominations each, followed by Aakrosh and Aasha with 7 nominations each, and Khubsoorat and Qurbani with 6 nominations each.

Aakrosh won 6 awards, including Best Director (for Govind Nihalani), Best Actor (for Naseeruddin Shah) and Best Supporting Actor (for Om Puri), thus becoming the most-awarded film at the ceremony.

Rekha received dual nominations for Best Actress for her performances in Judaai and Khubsoorat, winning for the latter.

== Main awards ==
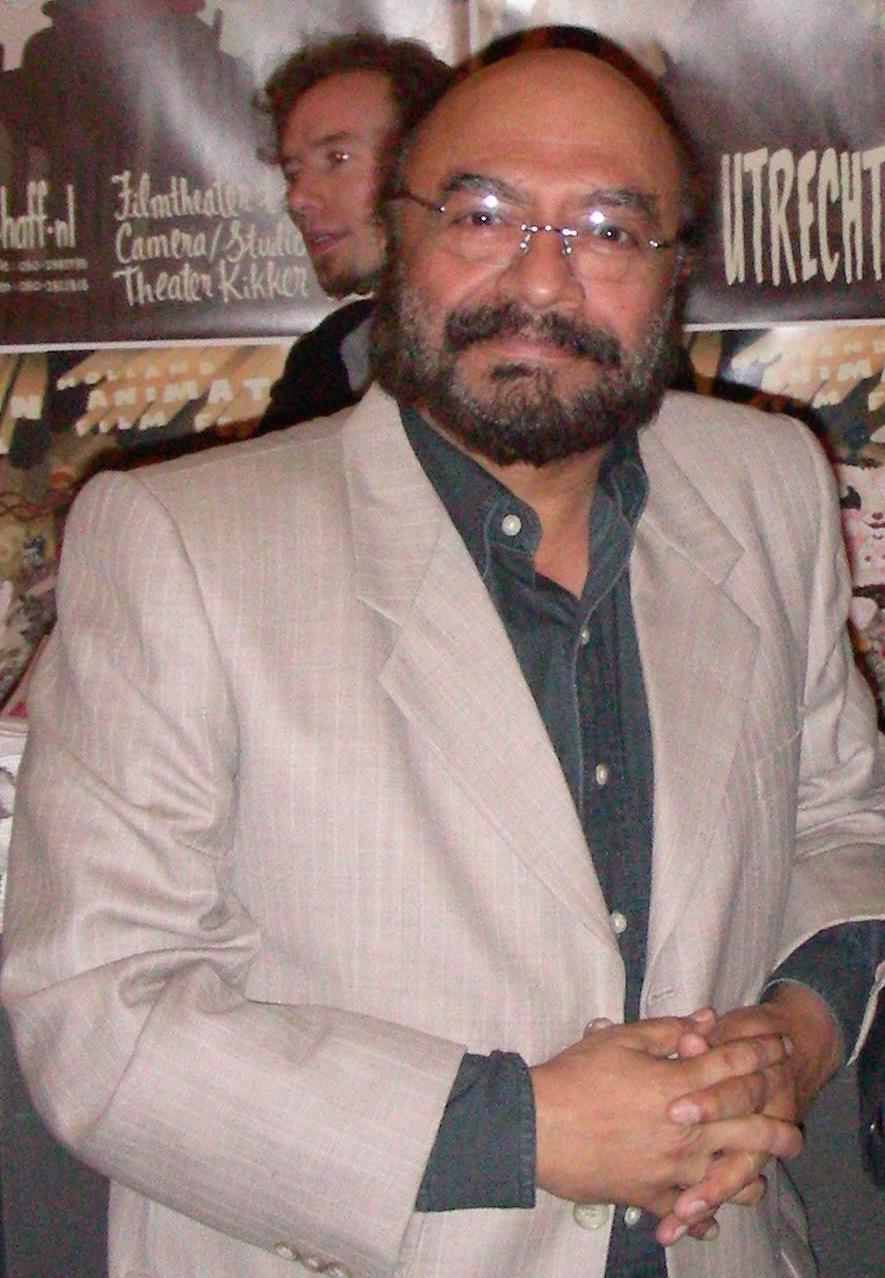
Govind Nihalani — Best Director winner for Aakrosh

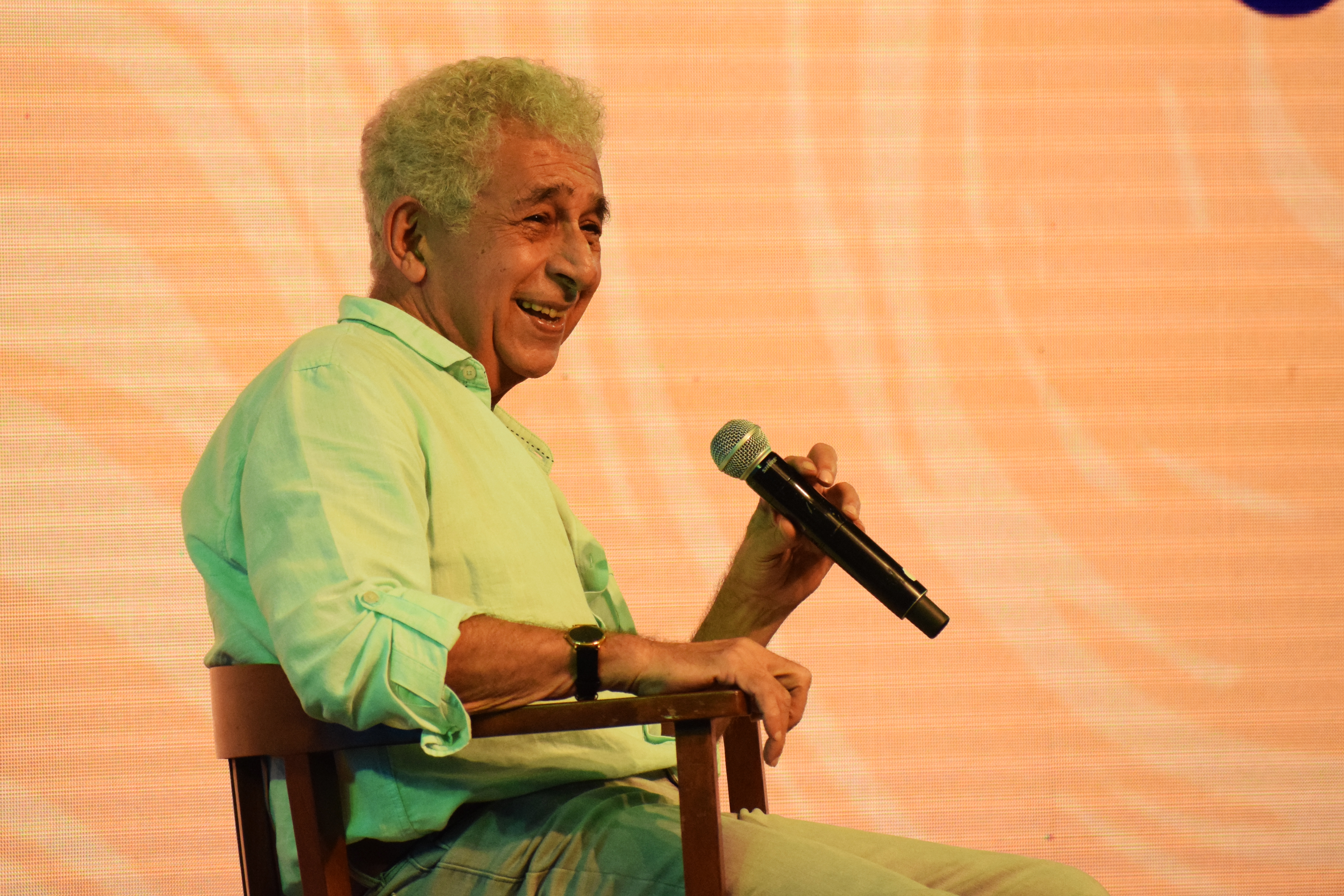
Naseeruddin Shah — Best Actor winner for Aakrosh

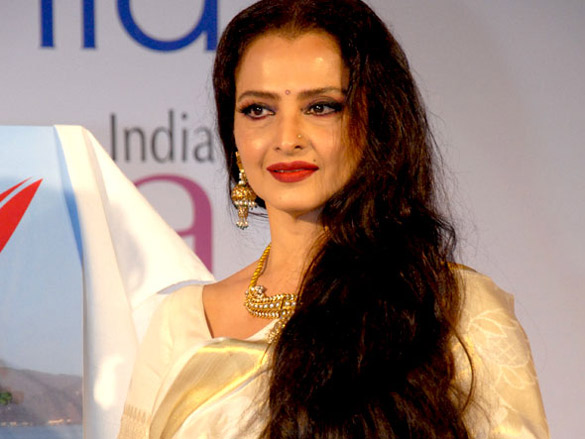
Rekha — Best Actress winner for Khubsoorat

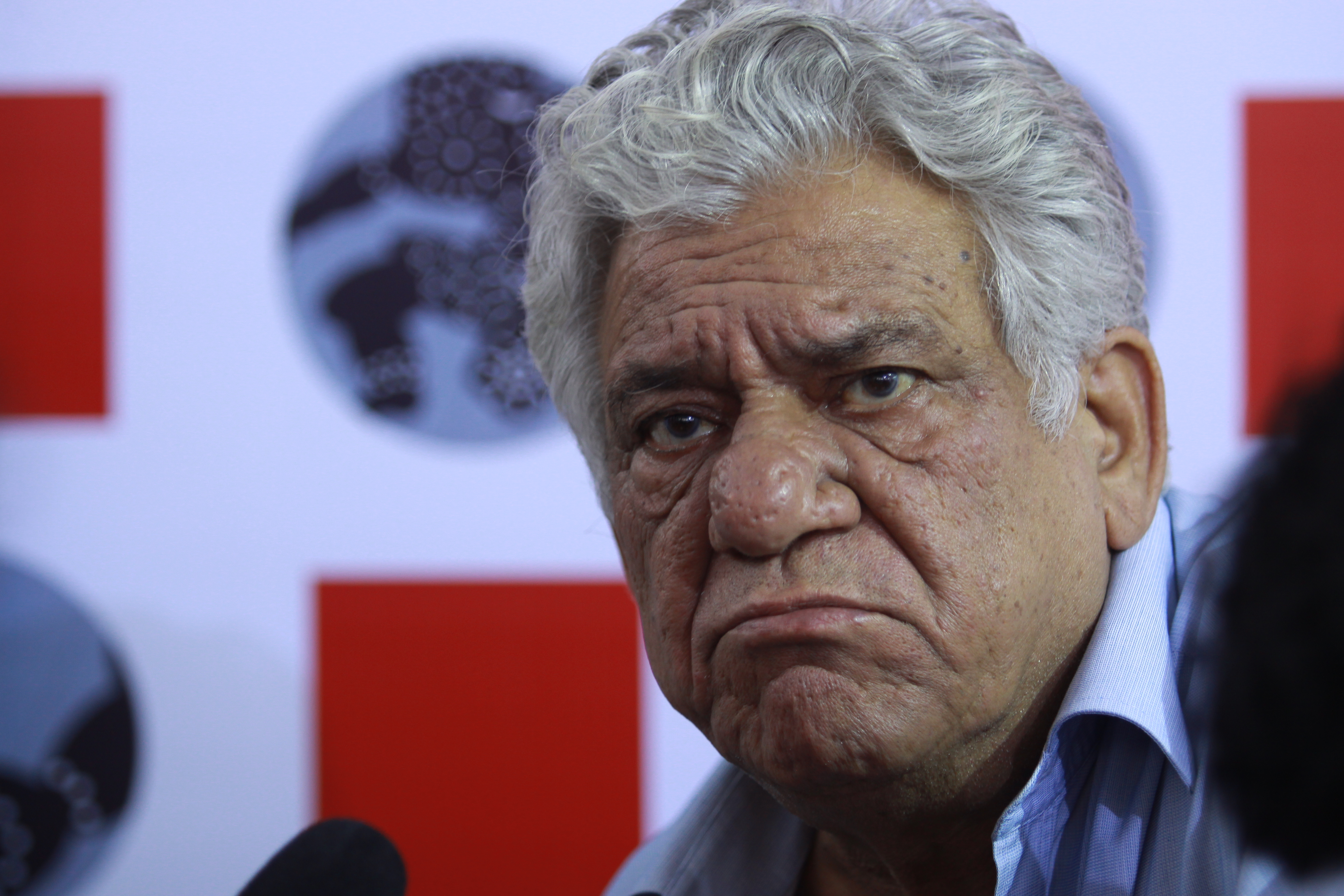
Om Puri — Best Supporting Actor winner for Aakrosh

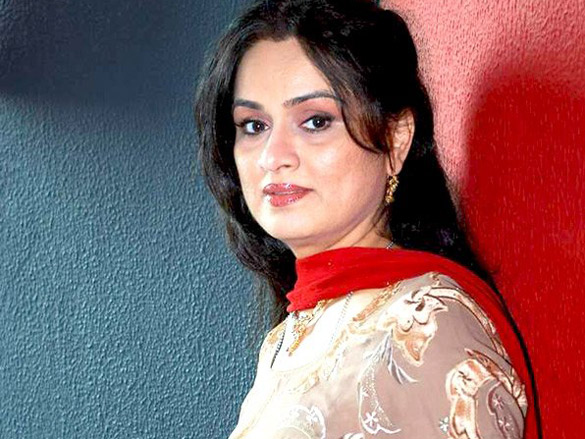
Padmini Kolhapure — Best Supporting Actress winner for Insaf Ka Tarazu

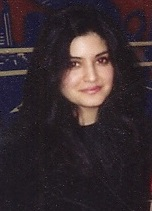
Nazia Hassan — Best Playback singer, Female winner for "Aap Jaisa Koi" (Qurbani)

=== Best Film ===
Khubsoorat

- Aakrosh
- Aasha
- Insaaf Ka Tarazu
- Thodisi Bewafaii

=== Best Director ===
Govind Nihalani – Aakrosh

- B. R. Chopra – Insaaf Ka Tarazu
- Esmayeel Shroff – Thodisi Bewafaii
- Hrishikesh Mukherjee – Khubsoorat
- J. Om Prakash – Aasha

=== Best Actor ===
Naseeruddin Shah – Aakrosh

- Amitabh Bachchan – Dostana
- Raj Babbar – Insaaf Ka Tarazu
- Rajesh Khanna – Thodisi Bewafaii
- Shatrughan Sinha – Dostana
- Vinod Khanna – Qurbani

=== Best Actress ===
Rekha – Khubsoorat

- Reena Roy – Aasha
- Rekha – Judaai
- Shabana Azmi – Thodisi Bewafaii
- Zeenat Aman – Insaaf Ka Tarazu

=== Best Supporting Actor ===
Om Puri – Aakrosh

- Amjad Khan – Qurbani
- Girish Karnad – Aasha
- Raj Kapoor – Abdullah
- Shreeram Lagoo – Insaaf Ka Tarazu

=== Best Supporting Actress ===
Padmini Kolhapure – Insaaf Ka Tarazu

- Ashalata – Apne Paraye
- Dina Pathak – Khubsoorat
- Rameshwari – Aasha
- Simi Garewal – Karz

=== Best Comic Actor ===
Keshto Mukherjee – Khubsoorat

- Asrani – Hum Nahin Sudhrenge
- Deven Verma – Judaai
- Deven Verma – Thodisi Bewafaii
- Keshto Mukherjee – Be-Reham

=== Best Story ===
Aakrosh – Vijay Tendulkar

- Aasha – Ram Kelkar
- Insaaf Ka Tarazu – Shabd Kumar
- Khubsoorat – D. N. Mukherjee
- Thodisi Bewafaii – Esmayeel Shroff

=== Best Screenplay ===
Aakrosh – Vijay Tendulkar

=== Best Dialogue ===
Insaaf Ka Tarazu – Shabd Kumar

=== Best Music Director ===
Karz – Laxmikant–Pyarelal

- Aasha – Laxmikant–Pyarelal
- Qurbani – Kalyanji–Anandji
- Shaan – R. D. Burman
- Thodisi Bewafaii – Khayyam

=== Best Lyricist ===
Thodisi Bewafaii – Gulzar for Hazaar Rahein Mudke Dekhi

- Aasha – Anand Bakshi for Sheesha Ho Ya Dil Ho
- Dostana – Anand Bakshi for Salamat Rahe Dostana
- Karz – Anand Bakshi for Dard-e-Dil
- Karz – Anand Bakshi for Om Shanti Om

=== Best Playback Singer, Male ===
Thodisi Bewafaii – Kishore Kumar for Hazaar Rahein Mudke Dekhi

- Abdullah – Mohammad Rafi for Maine Poocha Chand Se
- Dostana – Mohammad Rafi for Mere Dost Qissa Yeh
- Karz – Kishore Kumar for Om Shanti Om
- Karz – Mohammed Rafi for Dard-E-Dil
- Sargam – Mohammad Rafi for Dafaliwale Dafli Baja

=== Best Playback Singer, Female ===
Qurbani – Nazia Hassan for Aap Jaisa Koi

- Aap To Aise Na The – Hemlata for Tu Is Tarah Se
- Griha Pravesh – Chandrani Mukherjee for Pehchan To Thi
- Pyaara Dushman – Usha Uthup for Hari Om Hari
- Qurbani – Kanchan for Laila O Laila

=== Best Art Direction ===
Aakrosh – C. S. Bhati

=== Best Cinematography ===
Shaan – S. M Anwar

=== Best Editing ===
Insaaf Ka Tarazu S. B. Mane

=== Best Sound ===
Qurbani – P. Harikishan

== Critics' awards ==
=== Best Film ===
Albert Pinto Ko Gussa Kyoon Aata Hai

=== Best Documentary ===
They Call Me Chamar

== Biggest Winners ==
- Aakrosh – 6/7
- Khubsoorat – 3/6
- Insaaf Ka Tarazu – 3/9
- Qurbani – 2/6
- Thodisi Bewafaii – 2/9
- Karz – 1/6
- Aasha – 0/6

== See also ==
- 29th Filmfare Awards
- 30th Filmfare Awards
- Filmfare Awards
