= Nishana =

Nishana may refer to:

== Films ==
- Nishana (1980 film), a 1980 Bollywood action film
- Nishana (1995 film), a 1995 Hindi-language Indian feature film
- Nishana (2002 film), a 2002 Bengali-language Indian feature film; see List of Bengali films of 2002

== Places ==
- Nishana, Songadh, a village in Gujarat, India
