= Tarkieb =

- Directed by: Esmayeel Shroff
- Written by: Moin-ud-din
- Produced by: Jay Mehta
- Starring: Nana Patekar; Tabu; Shilpa Shetty; Aditya Pancholi; Milind Soman; Ashutosh Rana
- Cinematography: Mazhar Kamran
- Edited by: A. R. Rajendran
- Music by: Aadesh Shrivastava
- Production company: Prathima Films
- Release date: 23 June 2000 (India)
- Country: India
- Language: Hindi
- Budget: ₹5 crore
- Box office: ₹9.24 crore

Tarkieb is a 2000 Indian Hindi-language crime drama film directed by Esmayeel Shroff and produced by Jay Mehta. It stars Nana Patekar, Tabu, Shilpa Shetty, Aditya Pancholi, Milind Soman and Ashutosh Rana.

== Plot ==
A washer girl finds a hand in a creek where she was washing clothes. She and other washers nearby gather together and summon the police. After an investigation, the police find various parts of this body, and determine it to be that of a young woman. They do not succeed in finding the head of the corpse, and a check with missing persons produces negative results. When Inspector Pyare Mohan, who was assigned to this investigation, receives a threat by an anonymous caller on the phone, he recommends that this file be closed.

Then additional evidence surfaces, and the case is turned over to CBI Officer Jasraj Patel, who along with his assistant, Gangaram, arrives to take over this investigation. They find out that the corpse is indeed of a young woman, Roshni Choubey. Roshni comes from a poor family of four unmarried sisters. Roshni seemed to be involved with several men of Army Hospital, including Dr. Kamal Dogra, Mohan Multani, Captain Ajit Verma and Bishan Nanda - all of whom have a motive for killing her and disposing of her body. Determining who is the real killer - is the challenge that now faces Jasraj, apart from the telephonic threat that he too has received from the anonymous caller. Patel delves into the case even more deeply, putting his life at risk as the killer is constantly trying to bump him off. Eventually, Patel concludes that Roshni might not have been killed by any of the men she was involved with.

In the end, it is revealed that Bishan Nanda has killed Roshni as she becomes the object of his lust. Jasraj Patel finally succeeds in nabbing Roshni's murderer and putting him behind bars.

== Cast ==
- Nana Patekar as CBI Asst. Director Jasraj Patel
- Tabu as Lt. Roshni Bharadwaj
- Shilpa Shetty as Lt. Preeti Sharma
- Aditya Pancholi as Mohan Multani, Businessman
- Milind Soman as Captain Ajit Sharma née Verma, AMC
- Ashutosh Rana as Major (Dr.) Kamal Dogra
- Tiku Talsania as Gangaram / Musafir Singh
- Akhilendra Mishra as ex-L/Nk. Bishan Nanda, mess and canteen contractor
- Raghuvir Yadav as Nainsukh, blind shopkeeper
- Razzak Khan as Dr. Sunder Trivedi, gold-teeth specialist
- Javed Khan as ice-cream vendor
- Deepak Qazir as Inspector Pyare Mohan
- Vinod Nagpal as Chandrakant Choubey, Roshni's father
- Cyrus Herald as Police Commissioner
- Annapoorna as Lali
- Pradeep Karnaik as CBI Director
- Meghana Tiwari as Shanti, Roshni's immediate younger sister
- Farah as Roshni Ashwini (fake), Roshni's second sister
- Aayukti as Nandini, Roshni's youngest sister
- Smith as Multani's son
- Neha as Multani's daughter
- Menaka as Call girl
- Qamar Khan as RTO Officer
- Razzaq Siddiqui as Station Master
- Amit Srivastava as Hotel boy
- Shahzad Sheikh as Driver
- Suzanne Rodrigues as singer in club, in the song "Dil Mera Tar Se"

Additionally Shaan and Sagarika appeared in a special appearance in the song "Dil Mera Tarse"

== Soundtrack ==
Tarkieb

Soundtrack album by Aadesh Shrivastava
- Released: 17 April 2000
- Genre: Feature film soundtrack
- Languages: Hindi, Urdu
- Label: Zee Music

All songs were written by Nida Fazli. Soundtrack is Disc Mobile available on Zee Music.

#	Title	Singer(s)
1	"Dil Mera Tarse"	Shaan, Sagarika
2	"Dupatte Ka Palloo"	Richa Sharma
3	"Tujhe Dhundoon Main"	Mano, Alka Yagnik
4	"Kiska Chehra"	Jagjit Singh, Alka Yagnik
5	"Kisikika Ban Ja Ban Ja"	Sabri Brothers

== Reception ==
Taran Adarsh of IndiaFM gave the film 2 stars out of 5, writing ″On the whole, TARKIEB lacks in shock-value (a must for any murder mystery!) and repeat-value (for people to throng the theatres despite knowing the identity of the killer!). Even the initial-value is missing, which combined together will result in the film facing a rough time at the box-office.″ Kanchana Suggu of Rediff.com wrote ″To cut a long story short, Tarkieb is… well, pathetic. Going by the way it began, it could have been a good thriller. Unfortunately, it isn't.″
