= Dostana (1980 film) =

1980 Indian film by Raj Khosla

- Film poster
- Directed by: Raj Khosla
- Written by: Salim–Javed
- Produced by: Yash Johar
- Starring: Amitabh Bachchan; Shatrughan Sinha; Zeenat Aman; Prem Chopra
- Cinematography: Nariman A. Irani
- Edited by: Waman Bhonsle
- Music by: Laxmikant–Pyarelal
- Distributed by: Dharma Productions
- Release date: 17 October 1980
- Running time: 153 minutes
- Country: India
- Language: Hindi

Dostana (transl. Friendship) is a 1980 Indian Hindi-language action drama film, written by Salim–Javed, produced by Yash Johar, and directed by Raj Khosla. The film stars Amitabh Bachchan, Shatrughan Sinha, Zeenat Aman in lead roles and Prem Chopra, Amrish Puri, Helen, Pran in supporting roles. The film became the fourth highest-grosser of 1980, behind Qurbani, Aasha and Ram Balram. It was remade in Tamil as Sattam with Kamal Haasan.

== Plot ==
Vijay Verma and Ravi Kapoor are best friends who do not question each other about their careers. Vijay is a police officer and Ravi is a lawyer. While Vijay catches criminals with the help of an informant named Tony Ravi bails those criminals out and is employed by the villainous Daaga. One day, both Vijay and Ravi meet Sheetal at different places and times, and both fall in love with her. While Vijay’s love is more vocal and is reciprocated by Sheetal, Ravi has a one-sided crush on Sheetal, who only sees him as a friend.

Ravi admits his love for Sheetal to Vijay, who is devastated but decides to sacrifice his love for Ravi's sake. He writes a letter to Sheetal saying that they have to give up their relationship for Ravi; the letter accidentally reaches Ravi first, but he does not read it. Daaga finds out about Vijay and Sheetal's relationship through a photograph, and decides to cause trouble in Vijay and Ravi's friendship by revealing Vijay and Sheetal's relationship to Ravi. Vijay and Ravi become rivals for the first time, and Ravi takes Daaga's side in return for making Vijay's life hell. One day, Tony tells Vijay his story: he was in charge of the checkpoints that check trucks. He was threatened by an unknown criminal (apparently Daaga) to let a certain truck through without checking, but he refuses and tips the police off to the truck. In retaliation, Daaga sends a truck to run over him and his family, killing his wife and disabling his son Johnny. Later, Daaga frames Vijay for killing a criminal he was interrogating for info on Daaga. Ravi defends him on the condition that Sheetal sleeps with him for one night. On the night, he finds and reads the letter that Vijay wrote to Sheetal and repents and rekindles his friendship with Vijay.

Just then, Daaga captures them. Vijay comes to the rescue, but is also captured. Daaga's moll Sylvia, who is really a spy, and Tony's wife's sister, that gives Tony his info, saves them. Daaga fatally shoots Tony, who dies in Vijay's arms with the final wish that Vijay takes care of Johnny, and escapes with Balwant Singh in a plane, but is forced to land by Ravi and Vijay, who are using a jeep and helicopter. Balwant Singh gets shot by Daaga because he couldn't run due to ankle sprain while jumping off the charter plane. Daaga attempts to escape, but is caught by Vijay. He tries to shoot Vijay with a pocket gun and get shot dead in return by Vijay instead.

== Cast ==
- Amitabh Bachchan as CID Inspector Vijay Verma
- Shatrughan Sinha as Advocate Ravi Kapoor
- Zeenat Aman as Sheetal Sahni
- Prem Chopra as Daaga
- Amrish Puri as Balwant Singh
- Helen as Sylvia
- Pran as Tony
- Gajanan Jagirdar as High School Principal Tyagi
- Sajjan as Ramniklal Tiwari
- Trilok Kapoor as Police Commissioner Sahni
- Iftekhar as Prosecuting Lawyer Shyam Kumar
- K. N. Singh as Judge
- Paintal as Eve-Teaser
- Jagdish Raj as Driver Darshan (Daaga's Man)
- Sharat Saxena as Photographer Suraj (Daaga's Man)
- Mohan Sherry as Sunil, Daaga's Man
- Keshav Rana as Lalit, Daaga's Man
- Mac Mohan as Jagmohan, Daaga's Man
- Sudhir as Inspector Shinde
- Goga Kapoor as Baldev Singh
- Yunus Parvez as Gold Smuggler Saxena
- Vikas Anand as Dr. Karamchandani
- Ruby Mayer as Nun
- Sudha Chopra as Teresa
- Master Rajesh Valecha as Johny
- Raj Kumar Kapoor as Mr. Sahni

In a scene from the film, Amitabh Bachchan beats Sajjan in the prison, who is later killed by another prisoner. This scene was lifted by Raj Khosla from his previous directorial C.I.D. (1956), where the same circumstances were faced by Dev Anand.

Coincidentally, Karan Johar, the son of the film's producer Yash Johar, also went on to produce a film of the same name starring Abhishek Bachchan (Amitabh Bachchan's son), John Abraham and Priyanka Chopra.

== Soundtrack ==
The music for Dostana was composed by the duo Laxmikant–Pyarelal and the lyrics were written by Anand Bakshi.

- "Salamat Rahe Dostana Hamara" was listed at #32 on Binaca Geetmala annual list 1980
- "Mere Dost Kissa Yeh Kya Ho Gaya" was listed at #27 on Binaca Geetmala annual list 1981

| Song | Singer |
|---|---|
| "Bahoot Khoobsurat Ek Ladki" | Kishore Kumar |
| "Dillagi Ne Di Hawa" | Kishore Kumar, Asha Bhosle |
| "Salamat Rahe Dostana Hamara" (Part 1) | Kishore Kumar, Mohammed Rafi |
| "Salamat Rahe Dostana Hamara" (Part 2) | Kishore Kumar, Mohammed Rafi |
| "Mere Dost Kissa Yeh Kya Ho Gaya" | Mohammed Rafi |
| "Kitna Aasaan Hi Kehna Bhool Jao" | Lata Mangeshkar |

== Box office ==
Dostana was a major commercial success at the box office, earning an Indian nett collection of ₹4.50 crore and achieving "Super Hit" status. The film went on to garner a domestic gross collection of ₹9 crore (₹90 million) and an estimated worldwide gross of ₹9.25 crore.

With its strong theatrical run, it emerged as the fourth highest-grossing Indian film of 1980, trailing closely behind Qurbani, Aasha, and Ram Balram. The film marked a highly profitable debut for producer Yash Johar under his newly established banner, Dharma Productions. Running for over 25 weeks in several premier cinemas across India, the film celebrated a "Silver Jubilee" theatrical run.

== Awards ==
28th Filmfare Awards:

Nominated

- Best Actor – Amitabh Bachchan
- Best Actor – Shatrughan Sinha
- Best Lyricist – Anand Bakshi for "Salamat Rahe Dostana Humara"
- Best Male Playback Singer – Mohammed Rafi for "Mere Dost Kissa Yeh Kya Ho Gaya"
