= Jal Mahal (film) =

1980 film directed by Raghunath Jhalani

- Poster
- Directed by: Raghunath Jhalani
- Written by: Charandas Shokh (dialogues)
- Screenplay by: Shashi Bhushan
- Story by: Shashi Bhushan
- Produced by: R. K. Soral
- Starring: Jeetendra; Rekha
- Cinematography: Bipin Gajjar
- Edited by: Waman Bhonsle; Gurudutt Shirale
- Music by: R. D. Burman
- Production company: Suyog Films
- Release date: 4 July 1980
- Running time: 133 minutes
- Country: India
- Language: Hindi

Jal Mahal (transl. Water Palace) is a 1980 Hindi-language thriller film, produced by R. K. Soral under the Suyog Films banner and directed by Raghunath Jhalani. It stars Jeetendra, Rekha and music composed by R. D. Burman.

== Cast ==
- Jeetendra as Ravi
- Rekha as Rekha / Namita / Gayatri
- Pran as Devendra Pratap Singh
- Deven Verma as Shankar
- Rajesh Behl as Rajesh Thakur
- Manmohan Krishna as Dindayal
- Chand Usmani as Shanti
- Jayshree T. as Saroj
- Jagdeep as Munshi Aashiq Hussain Dildaar

== Soundtrack ==
Lyrics: Majrooh Sultanpuri

Song	Singer
"Main Hoon Diya"	Lata Mangeshkar
"Dekh Raha Koi"	Lata Mangeshkar
"Jai Jai Shyam"	Asha Bhosle
"Zindagi Ko Jab"	Asha Bhosle
"Tataiya Ne Dank Mara, Hay Mori Maiya"	Asha Bhosle, Mohammed Rafi
