= Seetamalakshmi =

1978 film by Kasinathuni Viswanath

- Directed by: K. Viswanath
- Written by: Jandhyala (dialogues)
- Story by: K. Viswanath
- Produced by: Murari – Naidu
- Starring: Talluri Rameswari; Chandra Mohan; Sridhar; Vankayala Satyanarayana; Tulasi
- Cinematography: U. Rajagopal
- Edited by: G. G. Krishna Rao
- Music by: K. V. Mahadevan
- Release date: 24 February 1978
- Country: India
- Language: Telugu

Seetamalakshmi is a 1978 Indian Telugu-language film written and directed by K. Viswanath. The film stars Talluri Rameswari (in her Telugu debut) and Chandra Mohan. It was released on 27 July 1978. It won two state Nandi Awards and a Filmfare Award for Best Actress - Telugu for Talluri Rameswari. Seetamalakshmi was remade in Tamil as Enippadigal (1979), and in Hindi as Sitara (1980).

== Plot ==
Kondayya (Chandra Mohan) and Seetalu (Rameswari) work in a touring theatre in a village and are in love. While essentially illiterate, they love watching movies and learn to recite the film dialogues and songs. A film producer who comes to the village makes a false promise to make Seetalu heroine in his films. Seetalu goes to Hyderabad along with Kondayya. After facing many difficulties, with the help of painter Sridhar, Seetalu finally becomes a heroine. Her success brings her relatives for want of her money. Kondayya slowly realizes that he cannot fit in that cine urban culture. He returns to the village. How the young lovers unite is the rest of the drama.

== Credits ==
=== Cast ===
- Talluri Rameswari as Seetalu
- Chandra Mohan as Kondayya
- Sridhar
- Vankayala Satyanarayana as Railway Station Master
- Eeswara Rao
- Dubbing Janaki
- Master Tulasiram as Pallavi
- Master Hari
- Pallavi
- P. L. Narayana
- Sakshi Ranga Rao

=== Crew ===
- Art Director: Thota Tharani

== Soundtrack ==
- "Chalu Chalu Ee Virasalu" (Lyrics: Devulapalli Krishnasastri; Singers: G. Anand and Vijayalakshmi Sarma
- "Kokoroko Koruko Em Kavalo Koruko" (Lyrics: Veturi; Singers: P. Susheela and S. P. Balasubrahmanyam)
- "Maavi Chiguru Tinagane Kovila Palikena" (Lyrics: Devulapalli Krishnasastri; Singers: P. Susheela and S. P. Balasubrahmanyam)
- "Nuvvitta Nenitta Kookunte Inketta" (Lyrics: Veturi; Singers: P. Susheela and S. P. Balasubrahmanyam)
- "Pade Pade Padutunna Padina Pate" (Lyrics: Veturi; Singer: P. Susheela; Cast: Tulasi)
- "Seetalu Singaram Malacchi Bangaram" (Lyrics: Veturi; Singers: P. Susheela and S. P. Balasubrahmanyam)
- "Ey Pata Ne Padanu Bratuke Pataina Pasivadanu" (Lyrics: Veturi; Singers: P. Susheela, Vani Jayaram and Vijayalakshmi Sarma)

== Awards ==
Nandi Awards - 1978

- Best Child Actress - Baby Thulasi
- Best Lyricist - Devulapalli Krishnasastri

Filmfare Awards South

- Filmfare Award for Best Actress - Telugu - Talluri Rameswari (1978)
