= Mera Rakshak =

- Directed by: R. Thyagarajan
- Written by: Ram Govind
- Story by: Sandow M. M. A. Chinnappa Thevar
- Produced by: Sandow M. M. A. Chinnappa Thevar
- Starring: Mithun Chakraborty; Rameshwari; Rakesh Pandey; Abhi Bhattacharya; Gayathri; Jayamalini; Shriram Lagoo; Ram Govind
- Cinematography: V. Ramamoorthy
- Edited by: M. G. Balu Rao
- Music by: Ravindra Jain
- Production company: Devar Films
- Distributed by: Devar Films
- Release date: 2 June 1978
- Running time: 156 mins
- Country: India
- Language: Hindi

Mera Rakshak (transl. My protector) is a 1978 Indian Hindi-language film directed by R. Thyagarajan. Mithun Chakraborty, Rameshwari, Rakesh Pandey and Gayatri play key roles in this film along with a goat who acts as the "Rakshak" (bodyguard) in the film. It was made by C. Dandhayutpani, who firstly gave Haathi Mere Saathi to Rajesh Khanna and Tanuja, followed by Jaanwar Aur Insaan to Shashi Kapoor and Rakhee Gulzar, Do Aur Do Paanch to Shashi Kapoor, Amitabh Bachchan, Hema Malini and Parveen Babi and Shubh Din to a newcomer, Rajesh Lahar. The film was a remake of the Tamil movie Aattukara Alamelu. The film was a first major commercial box office success for the then struggling actor Mithun Chakraborty who would go on to become a legendary superstar in the Hindi Film Industry for the next 2 decades (Especially in 1980s and 1990s).

== Cast ==
- Mithun Chakraborty as Vijay Rai
- Rameshwari as Bijli
- Abhi Bhattacharya as Bansi Kaka
- Shreeram Lagoo as Avinash Rai
- Gayatri (actress) as Radha Rai
- Rakesh Pandey (actor) as Mangal
- Jayamalini as Kamini
- Ram Govind as Lawyer
- Bakra as Ramu (Animal)

== Music ==
Lyricist and music director: Ravindra Jain

| # | Song | Singer |
|---|---|---|
| 1 | "Behti Huyi Dhaara" | Lata Mangeshkar |
| 2 | "Sabko Chhutti Mili" | Lata Mangeshkar, K. J. Yesudas |
| 3 | "Tere Hothon Ke Pyaale" | Lata Mangeshkar, K. J. Yesudas |
| 4 | "Kya Hua Tujhe Kya Hua" | Asha Bhosle |
