= Enippadigal =

1979 film by P. Madhavan

- Film poster
- Directed by: P. Madhavan
- Story by: K. Viswanath
- Produced by: K. S. Sethumadhavan
- Starring: Sivakumar; Shoba
- Cinematography: A. Somasundaram
- Edited by: T. R. Srinivasalu
- Music by: K. V. Mahadevan
- Production company: Ramya Chitra
- Release date: 16 February 1979
- Country: India
- Language: Tamil

Enippadigal (transl. Ladder Steps) is a 1979 Indian Tamil-language film directed by P. Madhavan and produced by K. S. Sethumadhavan. It is a remake of the 1978 Telugu film Seetamalakshmi. The film stars Sivakumar and Shoba. It was released on 16 February 1979.

== Plot ==
Chella Kannu, a young sweeper becomes a popular movie star known as Kamala Devi. Her lover and fellow sweeper Manickam is the ladder to her success, but the villainy of her brother Muthu separates them.

== Cast ==
- Sivakumar as Manickam
- Shoba as Chella Kannu (Kamala Devi)
- Sathyaraj as Muthu
- Manorama as Jayanthi
- Vadivukkarasi as Rani
- T. M. Sami Kannu as Samykannu
- A. Sakunthala as Chokkamma (Muthu's wife)
- P. T. Sivam as Ramalingam
- G. Srinivasan as Chella Kannu's father
- Mohan Sharma (cameo appearance)

Cameo appearances

- V. S. Raghavan as himself
- Kannan as Sambath
- V. Gopalakrishnan as himself
- S. Rama Rao as Singaram

== Production ==
Ennaipadigal, a remake of the Telugu film Seetamalakshmi (1978), was directed by P. Madhavan and produced by K. S. Sethumadhavan under Ramya Chitra. The dialogues were written by Mahendran. Cinematography was handled by A. Somasundaram, and the editing by T. R. Srinivasalu. N. Seshadri worked as sound engineer. The film was launched at AVM Studios.

== Soundtrack ==
The soundtrack was composed by K. V. Mahadevan, while the lyrics were written by Kannadasan. The song "Kannizhantha" is set in the Carnatic raga known as Hamir Kalyani.

Track listing
No.	Title	Singer(s)	Length
1.	"Yenunga Maappillai"	S. P. Balasubrahmanyam, P. Susheela	4:49
2.	"Poonthenil" (Male)	S. P. Balasubrahmanyam	4:41
3.	"Kannizhantha"	P. Susheela	4:26
4.	"Poonthenil Kalanthu" (Female)	P. Susheela	4:35
Total length:			18:31

== Release and reception ==
Enippadigal was released on 16 February 1979. Koushikan of Kalki appreciated the film for various aspects, including the cinematography and direction. Naagai Dharuman of Anna praised the acting of the cast, Mahendran's dialogues, Soman's cinematography, Mahadevan's music and Madhavan's direction. The film became a commercial success.

== Legacy ==
Sujatha Narayanan, writing for The New Indian Express, named Enippadigal as one of her favourite films starring Sivakumar. S. R. Ashok Kumar of The Hindu said that Shoba set "a new trend in realistic portrayals" through her performances in films like Enippadigal.

== Bibliography ==
- Mahendran (2013) [2004]. சினிமாவும் நானும் [Cinema and I] (in Tamil). Karpagam Publications. OCLC 54777094.
- Sundararaman (2007) [2005]. Raga Chintamani: A Guide to Carnatic Ragas Through Tamil Film Music (2nd ed.). Chennai: Pichhamal Chintamani. OCLC 295034757.
