= Jhutha Sach (film) =

- Poster
- Directed by: Esmayeel Shroff
- Written by: Moin-ud-din
- Produced by: A. G. Nadiadwala
- Starring: Dharmendra; Rekha
- Music by: R. D. Burman
- Release date: 1984
- Country: India
- Language: Hindi

Jhutha Sach (transl. False truth) is a 1984 Hindi-language drama film directed by Esmayeel Shroff and produced by A. G. Nadiadwala. It starring Dharmendra and Rekha. The film was remade in Telugu as Kodetrachu. It was the second movie for child actor Jugal Hansraj, after Masoom. the film was remake of 1982 Pakistani film Sangdil

== Story ==
After the passing of his wife, Sunita, Vijay brings up his two children, Bhishan and Charulata, who want him to remarry, and goes around selecting a mother. They pick on Alka, who is a stage singer and lives alone as a paying guest. Vijay and Alka approve of each other, get married, and go on a honeymoon. On the way back, Vijay drives too fast, has an accident, and is killed. Alka does not have the courage to tell the children, so she hires Vijay's lookalike, a dreaded bandit and killer named Tiger, who agrees to impersonate Vijay for 30 days, make the kids hate him, then leave forever, for a sum of 3 lakh rupees. Things do go according to plan, and the children do start hating their dad. But on the 30th day, Alka receives a phone call that the children have been kidnapped and the kidnapper is demanding a sum of 25 lakh rupees. The rest of the film is about who abducted the children and whether or not Tiger had a hand in it.

== Cast ==
- Dharmendra as Vijay / Tiger (Double Role)
- Rekha as Alka
- Aruna Irani as Bahar
- Amrish Puri as Kolga
- Jugal Hansraj as Bhishan "Binny"
- Baby Pinky as Charudatta “Chinki”
- Asrani as Bhajanlal
- Prema Narayan as Mrs. Bhajanlal
- Lalita Pawar as Governess
- Manik Irani as Daro

== Soundtrack ==
Lyrics: Majrooh Sultanpuri

Song	Singer
"Kaisi Lag Rahi Hoon Main, Kahiye Kya Khayal Hai"	Kishore Kumar, Lata Mangeshkar
"Kisi Ko Khona, Kisi Ko Pana, Yeh Khel Kitna Pyara Hai, Mil Gaya, Mil Gaya Dhunde Jisko Dil"	Kishore Kumar, Asha Bhosle, Preeti Sagar, Priya Mayekar
"Jahan Bin Hawa Ke Parda Hile"	Asha Bhosle
"Kya Karoon Main To Nikli"	Asha Bhosle
"Loot Gayi Main To Aaj"	Asha Bhosle
