= Thodisi Bewafaii =

- Theatrical release poster
- Directed by: Esmayeel Shroff
- Written by: Esmayeel Shroff
- Produced by: Nand Mirani
- Starring: Rajesh Khanna; Shabana Azmi
- Cinematography: Russi Billimoria
- Edited by: A. R. Rajendran
- Music by: Khayyam
- Release date: 29 April 1980
- Country: India
- Language: Hindi

Thodisi Bewafaii (lit. 'A little indiscretion') is a 1980 Bollywood romantic drama film directed by Esmayeel Shroff and produced by Nand Mirani. It stars Rajesh Khanna, Shabana Azmi in the lead roles. The film is noted for impressive performances by the cast and Khayyam's music with lyrics written by Gulzar.

Upon release, Thodisi Bewafaii performed well commercially and emerged a hit as well as one of the highest grossing films of 1980.

== Plot ==
Arvind Kumar Choudhary is an elderly, wealthy businessman whose wife is dead and who lives in a palatial mansion with his only son, Arun. He remarries with another woman, Sujata, a widow with two daughters, Veena and Seema. Arun assumes that the new woman in his father's life is a floozy and a gold-digger. He does not respect his new step-mother and refuses to even speak with her. Arun meets Neema Deshmukh and they fall in love with each other. With the approval of their respective families, they get married.

At work one day, Arun accidentally breaks a valuable diamond while daydreaming about Neema. He and his father are required to pay for the loss of value, and as a result, the Choudharys lose all their savings, building, vehicles and property. They are compelled to move to a shanty apartment. Arvind passes away from the trauma of seeing his life's work destroyed. Arun takes over the reins of this family, and it is necessary for him to interact with his stepmother to settle various legal matters. He finds that she is a noble, forgiving lady with a generous heart and he develops respect for her. Around this time, Neema gives birth to a baby boy and they name him Abhinandan.

Misunderstandings occur between Sujata and Neema, they escalate, fueled by some gossip from neighboring women, leading to arguments between Neema and Arun (who is now reconciled with his step-mother and takes her side). One day, Neema's brother Mahendra sees Arun with another woman. This is Dr. Karuna, a family friend who has no interest in Arun or vice versa. Mahendra informs his sister, who packs her things, picks up her son in her arms and simply walks out of the house without making any effort to ascertain the facts. She goes back to her father's house to live with him and Mahendra. She then approaches the courts and secures custody of Abhinandan. The situation is that Arun is only allowed one brief visit a week, at 4 PM every Sunday. Arun, who is completely innocent of the charge of adultery, is extremely unhappy with this humiliation, especially after Neema makes problems and nuisance even during the few minutes every week when he is allowed to meet his son. He decides to wait until his son is 14 and then take him home.

Neema's father is arrested by the Anti-Corruption Bureau while accepting a huge bribe from a businessman named Lalwani. This results in huge public humiliation for the family and many doors are closed in their faces. Mahendra asks Neema to sell her jewellery and provide him with funds so that he can immigrate to Germany. She does what he wishes, with the result that he leaves for Germany, never to be heard from again. Neema takes her son Abhinandan and relocates to Nashik to live with her second brother Narendra and his wife. This is where Abhinandan grows up, always curious to know about his dad.

Years later, Arun, with hard work, has recovered his fortune and has become a rich and successful businessman. On Abhinandan's fourteenth birthday, Arun shows up on Neema's doorstep - only to be told that their son has run away from home. An enraged Arun must now find whether Neema is telling the truth or whether she is hiding their son someplace else. Actually, Neema is telling the truth. Only a few days previously, after some humiliating incident at school, Abhinandan had run away from home and made his way to the big city, Mumbai. In fact, he had coincidentally bumped into his father on the street and sought directions from him, with neither of them recognizing the other. He happens to get sick just outside the house of Dr. Karuna, who is a friend of Arun's family. She treats him and finds out that he is Arun's son. She immediately calls Arun to meet him. Arun flies to his son's bedside and the two are united with each other. Abhinandan returns to see his mother and gives her the news that he has found his father. She becomes a bit interested in Arun's whereabouts. However, Arun does not want to meet her or be reconciled with her because of the bitterness of the past.

Abhinandan (known affectionately as "Nandu") gets over his issues concerning paternity and develops into a healthy, college-going young man. In college, he falls in love with Meenu, who is his classmate. While on a bike ride with his friends, they are hit by a truck and Nandu is admitted to hospital. Both of his parents rush to his bedside and in this situation, Arun and Neema meet each other again. They resolve their differences and Neema accepts that she was very wrong with her suspicious, vengeful, adamant attitude. Abhinandan undergoes the required operation successfully with Neema and Arun on either side of his bed. At this point, Abhinandan asks his parents to come together. They implicitly give consent, and thus the family is united again.

== Cast ==
Actor/Actress	Character/Role	Notes
Rajesh Khanna	Arun Kumar Choudhary	
Shabana Azmi	Neema Choudhary	
A. K. Hangal	Arvind Kumar Choudhary	
Urmila Bhatt	Sujata Choudhary	
Gayatri	Veena Choudhary	
Gowri Khorana	Seema Choudhary	
Siddharth Ray	Abhinandan Choudhary aka Nandu	
Padmini Kolhapure	Meenu	Nandu's Girlfriend
Deven Verma	Noor -E- Chashmis	
Preeti Ganguly	Mrs. Noor-E-Chashmis	
Shreeram Lagoo	Surendra Deshmukh	as Dr. Shreeram Lagoo
Shashi Kiran	Mahendra Deshmukh	
Jalal Agha	Narendra Deshmukh	
Madhu Chauhan	Narendra's wife	
Maya Alagh	Dr. Karuna	as Dr. Maya Alagh
Dina Pathak	Dr. Karuna's mother	
Leela Mishra	Wedding Guest (song "Sunoji Bhabhi")	as Leela Misra
Lalita Kumari	Neighbour	
Murad	Judge	
Moolchand	Lala (Pawnshop Owner)	as Mulchand
Ram Avtar	Mr. Ram Avtaar (man with prescription)	as Ramavtar
Manmauji	Arun's Co-worker	Man with wig
Mushtaq Khan	Worker with sick wife	as Mushtaq
Viju Khote	Mr. Lalwani	
Khushboo	Nandu	
Dharamvir		as Dharmveer
Raja Bakshi		
Jameel		
Kishore		
Pramod Pathak		as Pramod
M. Ratan		
Sunder Taneja		
Gopal Naik		as Gopal
Sarkar		as Sirkar
Mani		
Siddharth Ray		

== Soundtrack ==
All the songs were composed by Khayyam with lyrics written by Gulzar.

- "Hazaar Rahen Mud Ke Dekhin" was listed at #23 on Binaca Geetmala annual list 1980.

#	Title	Singer(s)
1	"Ankhon Men Humne Aapke Sapne" (I)	Kishore Kumar
2	"Aaj Bichhde Hain"	Bhupinder Singh
3	"Ankhon Men Humne Aapke Sapne" (II)	Kishore Kumar, Lata Mangeshkar
4	"Barse Phuhar"	Asha Bhosle
5	"Hazaar Rahen Mud Ke Dekhin"	Kishore Kumar, Lata Mangeshkar
6	"Mausam Mausam Lovely Mausam"	Anwar, Sulakshana Pandit
7	"Suno Na Bhabhi"	Jagjit Kaur, Sulakshana Pandit
8	"Hazaar Rahen (Male)"	Kishore Kumar

== Awards ==
28th Filmfare Awards:

Won

- Best Lyricist – Gulzar for "Hazaar Rahein Mudke Dekhi"
- Best Male Playback Singer – Kishore Kumar for "Hazaar Rahein Mudke Dekhi"

Nominated

- Best Film – Konark Kombine International
- Best Director – Esmayeel Shroff
- Best Actor – Rajesh Khanna
- Best Actress – Shabana Azmi
- Best Comedian – Deven Verma
- Best Music Director – Khayyam
- Best Story – Esmayeel Shroff
