= God and Gun =

God And Gun
- Film poster
- Directed by: Esmayeel Shroff
- Written by: Moinuddin
- Produced by: Kulbhushan Gupta
- Starring: Raaj Kumar; Raj Babbar; Jackie Shroff; Gautami
- Cinematography: Pramod Pathak
- Edited by: Dilip Kotalgi; Zafar Sultan
- Music by: Anand–Milind
- Production company: K.B. Productions Pvt. Ltd.
- Release date: 27 April 1995
- Running time: 139 minutes
- Country: India
- Language: Hindi

God And Gun is a 1995 Indian Bollywood action drama film directed by Esmayeel Shroff and produced by Kulbhushan Gupta. The film stars Raaj Kumar, Raj Babbar, Jackie Shroff, and Gautami in lead roles. It was the final film of Raaj Kumar before his death in 1996 and was also the final film of Paidi Jairaj after completing 66 years in Bollywood.

== Plot ==
Saheb Bahadur Rathore is the only person who has the courage to stand against corrupt and powerful politician Satya Singh. Satya wants to win the upcoming election by hook or by crook. On the other side Vijay Prakash, a young man also set up a plan to kill corrupt politicians like Satya. Although the paths of Vijay and Saheb Bahadur are different, still they befriended to fight against corruption.

== Cast ==
- Raaj Kumar as Raj Bahadur Rathore
- Raj Babbar as Police Commissioner Avtar Singh
- Jackie Shroff as Vijay Prakash
- Gautami as Sujata Singh
- Prem Chopra as Balraj Sahu
- Sadashiv Amrapurkar as Satya Singh
- Rakesh Bedi as Bhola

== Soundtrack ==
Song	Singer
"Sab Kehne Lage"	Udit Narayan, Sadhana Sargam
"Tu Meri Ibtada Hai"	Kumar Sanu
"Aaya Tha Dhundne"	Kumar Sanu, Sadhana Sargam
"Tu Meri Ibtada Hai"	Sadhana Sargam
"Netaon Ki Dagar"	Abhijeet, Arun Bakshi
"Ban Gayi Ban Gayi"	Poornima
