= Locket (film) =

- Theatrical release poster
- Directed by: Ramesh Ahuja
- Written by: Madan Joshi (dialogues); Gauhar Kanpuri (lyrics)
- Screenplay by: D.P. Maurya; Aruna Jhalani
- Story by: D.P. Maurya
- Produced by: Tahir Hussain
- Starring: Jeetendra; Rekha; Vinod Mehra
- Cinematography: Anil Mitra
- Edited by: Ramesh Pai
- Music by: Bappi Lahiri
- Production company: T.V. Films
- Release date: 11 April 1986
- Running time: 156 minutes
- Country: India
- Language: Hindi

Locket is a 1986 Indian Hindi-language action film, produced by Tahir Hussain on T.V. Films banner and directed by Ramesh Ahuja. Starring Jeetendra, Rekha, Vinod Mehra and music composed by Bappi Lahiri.

== Cast ==
- Jeetendra as Shankar
- Rekha as Shalu
- Vinod Mehra as Rajkumar Anil Pratap Singh / Raja
- Kader Khan as Thakur Veer Pratap Singh
- Shreeram Lagoo as Diwan Sardarilal
- Nirupa Roy as Laxmi
- Iftekhar
- Vijayendra Ghatge as Inspector Vijay
- Asha Sachdev as Sonia
- Murad as Raja Saab
- Jagdeep
- Jagdish Raj
- Rabia Amin
- Sudha Chopra

== Soundtrack ==
| # | Song | Singer |
|---|---|---|
| 1 | "Bhole Shankar" | Kishore Kumar, Lata Mangeshkar |
| 2 | "Jo Bhi Kehna" | Suresh Wadkar, Preeti Sagar |
| 3 | "Main Gulbadan" | Usha Uthup |
| 4 | "Sholay Sholay" | Mohammed Rafi, Lata Mangeshkar |
| 5 | "Suno Satpalji" | Kishore Kumar, Mahendra Kapoor, Shailendra Singh |
