= Humjoli =

- Theatrical release poster
- Directed by: T. R. Ramanna
- Written by: Pt. Mukhram Sharma; Ramayan Tiwari
- Based on: Panakkara Kudumbam (1964)
- Produced by: Prasan Kapoor; Jeetendra (Presents)
- Starring: Jeetendra; Leena Chandavarkar; Mehmood
- Cinematography: M.A. Rehman
- Edited by: M.S. Money
- Music by: Laxmikant–Pyarelal
- Production company: Tirupati Pictures
- Distributed by: R.K. Studios; Rajkamal Studios; Vasu Studios; Vauhini Studios
- Release date: 27 May 1970
- Running time: 154 minutes
- Country: India
- Language: Hindi

Humjoli (transl. Fellow) is a 1970 Indian Hindi-language romantic drama film, produced by Prasan Kapoor under the Tirupati Pictures banner and directed by T. R. Ramanna. The film stars Jeetendra, Leena Chandavarkar, and Mehmood in leading role . And its music composed by Laxmikant Pyarelal. It is a remake of the Tamil film Panakkara Kudumbam (1964).

== Cast ==
- Jeetendra as Rajesh
- Leena Chandavarkar as Ranibala
- Pran as Gopal Das
- Shashikala as Shyama
- Mehmood as Shivram, Balram and as Parshuram (triple role)
- Aruna Irani as Shobha
- Nazir Hussain as Roopa's dad
- Manmohan as Manmohan
- C.S. Dubey as Shyama's Uncle
- D.K. Sapru as Rajesh's dad
- Purnima as Roopa Rai
- Geeta Banker as Lily
- Mumtaz as Cabaret Dancer

== Soundtrack ==
The music of this film was composed by Laxmikant–Pyarelal and the lyrics were written by Anand Bakshi.

#	Title	Singer(s)
1	"Chal Shuru Ho Ja"	Kishore Kumar, Mohammed Rafi
2	"Haye Re Haye"	Lata Mangeshkar, Mohammed Rafi
3	"Dhal Gaya Din Ho Gayi Sham"	Mohammed Rafi, Asha Bhosle
4	"Ho Tu Tu Tu"	Kamal Barot, Asha Bhosle
5	"Yeh Kaisa Aaya Zamana"	Kishore Kumar, Mukesh, Mahmood
6	"Tik Tik Tik Mera Dil"	Lata Mangeshkar, Mohammed Rafi
