= The Burning Train =

1980 Indian film by Ravi Chopra

- Theatrical release poster
- Directed by: Ravi Chopra
- Written by: Kamleshwar
- Story by: Ravi Chopra
- Produced by: B. R. Chopra
- Starring: Dharmendra; Vinod Khanna; Jeetendra; Vinod Mehra; Hema Malini; Parveen Babi; Neetu Singh; Danny Denzongpa
- Cinematography: Dharam Chopra
- Edited by: R. P. Bapat; S. B. Mane; Pran Mehra
- Music by: R. D. Burman
- Production companies: R. K. Studios; Film City; Natraj Studios
- Distributed by: B. R. Films; United Producers
- Release date: 20 March 1980
- Running time: 185 minutes
- Country: India
- Language: Hindi
- Budget: ₹2.5–3.25 crore
- Box office: ₹6.5 crore

The Burning Train is a 1980 Indian Hindi-language action disaster film produced by B.R Chopra and directed by Ravi Chopra. The film features an ensemble cast of Dharmendra, Vinod Khanna, Jeetendra, Hema Malini, Parveen Babi, Neetu Singh, Vinod Mehra and Danny Denzongpa. The plot revolves around a train named the Super Express, that catches fire on its inaugural run from New Delhi to Mumbai.

Inspired by the disaster films The Towering Inferno (1974) and The Bullet Train (1975), the film released worldwide on 28 March 1980 and received mainly positive reviews from critics for the performances of the cast, the action sequences, and the music. Negative criticism was mainly directed towards its length. At the box office, the film earned ₹6.5 crore worldwide and considered moderately successful despite being the 7th highest-grossing film of 1980 due to its expensive budget. The film is widely regarded as a cult classic today.

== Plot ==
The film begins with two best friends - Ashok and Vinod - along with a third boy, Randhir. Ashok is the son of a wealthy businessman and is passionate about cars, whereas Vinod and Randhir are passionate about trains. Ashok grows up being a car enthusiast, while Vinod and Randhir grow up to become railway engineers with the dream of building the fastest moving train in the country. Ashok falls in love with Seema and Vinod falls for Sheetal. Sheetal marries Vinod and gives birth to a boy, Raju.

One day Vinod, who is now a top notch railway engineer, gets awarded the contract to build a super-fast express train between New Delhi and Mumbai. Rakesh is his assistant. Randhir, the losing engineer and ex-lover of Sheetal swears revenge and leaves.

Tragedy strikes when Ashok gets the news that his father, Seth Dharmdas, committed suicide after losses in his business. Seema deceives him, and forlorn Ashok turns wanderer.

After six years of hard work, Vinod triumphs in building the train. This intense focus on his work takes a toll on his marriage. A day before the train's maiden journey, Sheetal tries to fetch Vinod for their anniversary party but he refuses, choosing to prepare for the train journey. An estranged Sheetal leaves Vinod with their son, Raju, on the train to go to her mother.

The train is set to cover the journey from Delhi to Mumbai in 14 hours. Many passengers board from Delhi, including Raja Ram Mohan and his wife, Padmini; absconding dreaded smuggler Chander and his fiancée Razia with Inspector Ranveer in their chase them in a disguise; Major P. K. Bhandari, a Pandit Shambhunath; a Muslim Abdul Rahim; ticketless passengers; a schoolteacher with students; Rakesh's pregnant wife; Seema with her doctor cousin and Ashok who is confounded to see Seema; and above all, Ravi, a prowler tailing Madhu, is running from a forcible splice with the jewelry, and they crush.

Randhir escorts the train, seemingly meaning no harm, but later sabotages the vacuum brakes and stealthily plants a bomb in the engine room before leaving. Ashok also departs after checking on Seema. He encounters and accompanies Randhir when he divulges his gruesome plan. Forthwith, Ashok rushes and catches the moving train but it is too late. Halfway through, the bomb explodes at 60 seconds killing the drivers and the caravan moves on without brakes. Panic-stricken Vinod and the Railway Board are desperately try to save the passengers. Vinod successfully converses with the passengers via All India Radio and outlines how to apply emergency brakes. Hence, Ashok, Ravi, and the guard Usman Ali try to go to the engine with the plucky endeavor.

Meanwhile, Rakesh's wife is in labor, so the doctor calls for hot water. Tragically, the petrified cook failed to switch off the gas which explodes. Whereat, Usman Ali and several passengers die, but Ashok and Ravi barely make it back by erecting gaps between the compartments. Consequently, Ashok understands Seema's 'betrayal' as her disability had led to an amputation in a mishap, and they reconcile. Vinod makes plan B by sending a helicopter to land one on the engine, which Randhir successfully sabotages but seemingly forges his own death as the helicopter blasts.

Parallelly, Ravi divulges his identity to Madhu, but she still accepts him. Sheetal also returns to Vinod and boasts of his courage. At Mumbai, Rakesh plans to build a steep incline to reduce the speed. Beyond, as an end-run, dauntless Vinod jeopardizes by arriving at the Super Express from one car to another with fireproof suits and dynamite. During that time, Ashok overpowers and kills Chander when he tries to stop the rescue work. Soon, Ashok, Vinod and Ravi cross the fire where Randhir awaits, whom they stop. Here, Vinod detects that all systems will fail if Ashok's plan of blasting the couplings from the engine is carried out, and will pose a threat of derailment, and then he picks up the incline. Ravi backs him and instructs the passengers to tie themselves to their seats.

Ashok and Vinod blow up the couplings while climbing the slope and jump off the derailing engine. The engine crashes and explodes at the Mumbai Central railway station but the coaches slow down and come to a halt. Finally, the film ends on a happy note, with the passengers conjoining with their relatives and giving tribute to the soul of India.

== Cast ==
Actor	Character	Notes
Dharmendra	Ashok Singh aka Ashokee Omnath	A rich man who loves to drive cars at high speeds
vishal desai	junior vinod vinni verma	
Vinod Khanna	Vinod "Vinni" Verma Somnath	Railway mechanical engineer
Jeetendra	Ravi Kumar	Thief
Hema Malini	Seema	Ashok's love interest
Parveen Babi	Sheetal V Verma	Vinod's wife
Neetu Kapoor	Madhu	Ravi's love interest
Vinod Mehra	Rakesh	junior engineer Police inspector/inspector sahab/inspector saab
Danny Denzongpa	Randhir	Railway mechanical engineer/Terrorist
Navin Nischol	Ajay	Doctor
Simi Garewal	Anupama	School teacher
Asha Sachdev	Ramkali	Qawwali singer
Madan Puri	Seth Dharamdas Singh	Ashok's father
Nazir Hussain	Mr.Verma	Vinod's father
Nana Palshikar	Niranjan	Seema's uncle
Urmila Bhatt	Sujata Mehta , Mrs Jagmohan	Randhir's mother
Iftekhar	Mr Jagmohan	Railway Board Chairman
Chandrashekhar	Surinder Mehta	Railway divisional manager
Jagdish Raj	Dango	Motorman of Super Express
M. Rajan	Jeevanlal	Motorman of Super Express
Dinesh Thakur	Usman Ali	Train Guard
Jankidas		Ticket Checker
Mac Mohan	Mac	Assistant supervisor
Sujit Kumar	Ranveer	Police Inspector
Ranjeet	Chander	Smuggler
Komila Virk	Razia	Chander's Associate
Asrani	P.K.Bhandari	Army Major
Gurbachan Singh	Mr.Dsouza	Helicopter Pilot
Romesh Sharma	Udesh	Ritu’s wife
Pramila Kapila	Ritu	Udesh's wife
Om Shivpuri	Raja Rammohan	Rani Padmini’s wife
Indrani Mukherjee	Rani Padmini	Raja Rammohan's wife
Mukri	Kanhaiya	Marwadi Seth
Shammi		Marwadi Seth Wife
Sudha Shivpuri		Rakesh's mother-in-law
Ravindra Kapoor		
Renu Joshi		
Yunus Parvez	Abdul Rehmann	Maulana
Rajendra Nath	Shambhunath	Pandit
T.P Jain		Pathan
Anand Balraj		Guy with guitar
Khushbu	Child artiste	School student
Kanwarjit Paintal		Ticketless travellers
Keshto Mukherjee		Ticketless travellers

== Soundtrack ==
The soundtrack was released in 1979. Music was composed by R. D. Burman and film song lyrics were by Sahir Ludhianvi. "The Burning Train" theme song has been described as a proto-techno theme.

No.	Title	Singer(s)	Length
1.	"Kisi Ke Vaade Pe"	Asha Bhosle
2.	"Meri Nazar Hai Tujh Pe, Teri Nazar Hai Mujh Pe"	Asha Bhosle
3.	"Pehli Nazar Mein Humne To Apna Dil De Diya Tha"	Kishore Kumar, Mohammed Rafi, Asha Bhosle, Usha Mangeshkar
4.	"Waada, Haan Waada"	Kishore Kumar, Asha Bhosle
5.	"Pal Do Pal Ka Saath Hamara" (Raga Kedar)	Mohammed Rafi, Asha Bhosle
6.	"Teri Hai Zameen Tera Aasman""	Padmini Kolhapure, Sushma Shrestha
7.	"The Burning Train" (Reprise & Theme)	R.D. Burman and Annette Pinto

== Box office ==
Made with a budget of ₹2.5–3.25 crore, the movie raked in ₹6.50 crore. In current time, the budget stands as ₹250–325 crore while earning stands at ₹650 crore. It was a Superhit movie at that time & one of the highest grosser in Indian Cinema during year 1980.

== See also ==
- The Bullet Train, Japanese film from 1975, a likely inspiration for this film
- Speed (1994 film), Hollywood film starring Keanu Reeves with a similar story
- Unstoppable (2010 film), Hollywood film starring Denzel Washington about a train disaster
