= Sitara (1980 film) =

- Poster
- Directed by: Meraj
- Story by: K. Viswanath
- Starring: Mithun Chakraborty; Zarina Wahab
- Music by: R. D. Burman; Gulzar (lyrics)
- Release date: 13 June 1980
- Running time: 125 min.
- Country: India
- Language: Hindi

Sitara (transl. Star) is a 1980 Indian Hindi-language film directed by Meraj, with Mithun Chakraborty, Zarina Wahab. The music was composed by R. D. Burman. The film was a remake of the Telugu film Seetamalakshmi.

== Plot ==
Sitara is the love story of two childhood lovers, Dhania and Kundan. They come to Mumbai, due to their economic conditions and they start working in a Cinema hall. Dhania is fascinated by films and has hidden desire to become an actress, so she often imitates the dances shown on movies. One day Dhania plays the record of the songs and starts dancing, assuming herself as the heroine of the film. She pulls Kundan up to join her and both get involved in the dance, forgetting everything. One person related with films watches them and he is impressed by the skill of Dhania and he helps her to become a film star Sarita from Dhania. Now Kundan feels lonely in this glamorous world and their love is lost somewhere. He still loves her, but she is lost in her dreams of becoming a superstar. Depressed, Kundan decides to return to his village. Sitara explores the life of actors coming from small towns and villages.

== Cast ==
- Mithun Chakraborty as Kundan
- Zarina Wahab as Dhania / Sarita
- Kanhaiyalal
- Agha
- Dinesh Thakur
- Paintal
- Yunus Parvez
- Mac Mohan

== Soundtrack ==
The music was composed by R. D. Burman. The lyrics were written by Gulzar.

| Song | Singer |
|---|---|
| "Yeh Saaye Hai" | Asha Bhosle |
| "Aap Aaye Garibkhane" | Asha Bhosle |
| "Sajna Ka Kangna, Kangna Mein Heera" | Asha Bhosle, Bhupinder Singh |
| "Saath Saath Tum Chalo To Raat Raatbhar Chale" | Asha Bhosle, Bhupinder Singh |
| "Thodi Si Zameen, Thoda Aasman, Tinkon Ka Bas" | Lata Mangeshkar, Bhupinder Singh |
