= Nishana, Songadh =

Nishana
- village
- Country: India
- State: Gujarat
- District: Tapi

Population (2011)
  - Total: 1,803

Languages
  - Official: Gujarati; Hindi
- Time zone: UTC+5:30 (IST)
- Sex ratio: 962 male/female

Nishana is a village in Tapi district of Gujarat state of India.
