= Roop Tera Mastana =

- Movie Poster
- Directed by: Khalid Akhtar
- Written by: Ahsan Rizvi (dialogues); Anand Bakshi; Verma Malik; Asad Bhopali (lyrics)
- Screenplay by: K.B. Lal; Ravi Kapoor
- Story by: K.B. Lal
- Produced by: Baldev Pushkarna; M.M.Malhotra
- Starring: Jeetendra; Mumtaz; Pran
- Cinematography: V. Durga Prasad
- Edited by: Prabhakar Supare
- Music by: Laxmikant Pyarelal
- Production company: Suchitra Kala Mandir
- Release date: 24 November 1972
- Running time: 154 minutes
- Country: India
- Language: Hindi

Roop Tera Mastana (transl. Your beauty is intoxicating) is a 1972 Hindi-language thriller film, produced by Baldev Pushkarna and M.M. Malhotra under the Suchitra Kala Mandir banner and directed by Khalid Akhtar. It stars Jeetendra, Mumtaz, Pran in lead roles and music composed by Laxmikant Pyarelal.

== Cast ==
- Jeetendra as Raja Sahib / Rajkumar (Double Role)
- Mumtaz as Princess Usha / Kiran (Double Role)
- Pran as Ajit
- I. S. Johar as CID Inspector
- Malika as Champa
- Brahm Bhardwaj as Kiran's Father
- Leela Mishra as Kiran's Mother
- Jankidas as Auctioneer

== Soundtrack ==
| Song | Singer |
|---|---|
| "Dil Ki Baaten Dil Hi Jane, Ankhen Chhere Sau Afsane" | Kishore Kumar, Lata Mangeshkar |
| "Banke Thanke Sajke Dhajke" | Lata Mangeshkar |
| "Lo Dekh Lo Woh Ghata" | Lata Mangeshkar |
| "Aakash Pe Do Tare Sadiyon Se Chamakte Hain" | Lata Mangeshkar, Mahendra Kapoor |
| "Bade Bewafa Hai Yeh" | Mohammed Rafi |
| "Haseen Dilruba" | Mohammed Rafi |
| "Pakdo Pakdo" | Mohammed Rafi |
