= Sharda (1981 film) =

- Poster
- Directed by: Lekh Tandon
- Written by: Kameshwar (dialogues)
- Screenplay by: Nabendu Ghosh
- Story by: Anuradha Tandon
- Produced by: K. K. Talwar
- Starring: Jeetendra; Rameshwari
- Cinematography: Jehangir Choudhary
- Edited by: Anand Kumar
- Music by: Laxmikant–Pyarelal
- Production company: Shiv Kala Mandir
- Release date: 10 April 1981
- Running time: 135 minutes
- Country: India
- Language: Hindi

Sharda is a 1981 Hindi-language drama film, produced by K. K. Talwar on Shiv Kala Mandir banner and directed by Lekh Tandon. It stars Jeetendra, Rameshwari and music composed by Laxmikant–Pyarelal.

== Cast ==
- Jeetendra as Indrajeet Malhotra
- Rameshwari as Sharda
- Usha Kiran as Indrajeet's mother
- Sarika as Anita Kohli
- Raj Babbar
- Kalpana Iyer
- Jagdeep
- Dina Pathak
- Om Prakash
- Madan Puri
- Pinchoo Kapoor

== Soundtrack ==
Music: Laxmikant–Pyarelal

Lyricist: Anand Bakshi

Song	Singer
"Aap Ka Khat Mila"	Lata Mangeshkar
"Jab Tak Hai Chanda"	Lata Mangeshkar
"Aa Gayi Woh Sakht Ghadi"	Parveen Sultana
"Ganga Maiya Tu Kya Jane"	Manna Dey
"Aa Main Tujhko Pyar Karun"	Asha Bhosle
"Kaahe Bindiya Lagayi, Maine Nindiya Gawayi"	Mohammed Rafi, Anuradha Paudwal
