= Sapnon Ka Mandir =

- Theatrical release poster
- Directed by: Pradip Jain
- Written by: Kader Khan (dialogues); Hasan Kamal; Sameer (lyrics)
- Produced by: Suresh Kumar Jain
- Starring: Jeetendra; Jaya Prada
- Music by: Laxmikant–Pyarelal
- Production company: Kamla Productions
- Release date: 2 August 1991
- Country: India
- Language: Hindi

Sapnon Ka Mandir (transl. Temple of Dreams) is a 1991 Indian Hindi-language drama film, produced by Suresh Kumar under the Kamla Productions banner and directed by Pradip Jain. It stars Jeetendra, Jaya Prada in the pivotal roles and music composed by Laxmikant–Pyarelal.

== Plot ==
Sanjay falls in love with Sangeeta. They get married. Their desire to have many children is marred when it turns out that Sangeeta have only one child. Their son grows up to be an intelligent school student. One day, when he does not return from school, the parents panic and search for him frantically. The two suspects they have in mind are Gulu who lusts after Sangeeta; and Maulah Baba, a blind beggar who used to meet Sonu every day at school time, because he loved him.

Sonu has fallen asleep in school and the school locked for 10 days. When a teacher rings up to give Sanjay and Sangeeta the news Gulu, who had entered the house in their absence, takes the call. He takes advantage of the situation and demands money from Sanjay.

Sanjay and Sangeeta's dog Sando goes running to the school and Sonu asks him to fetch his dad. On the way, vets grab a running Sando and take him away, taking him for a stray dog. Sando pretends to be dead, escapes when the door is opened, goes to Maulah Baba and takes him to the school. They break the lock and get Sonu out. But Gulu arrives on the scene and kills Maulah Baba. Police come and take Gulu. Sonu runs home with his dog and is reunited with his parents.

== Cast ==
- Jeetendra as Sanjay Sharma
- Jaya Prada as Sangeeta Sharma
- Kader Khan as Maulah Baba
- Asrani as Sangeeta's mama
- Gulshan Grover as Gulu
- Sripradha as Sheetal
- Johnny Lever as Malkarni
- Master Sunny as Sanjay's & Sangeeta's son, Sonu
- Master Ryan as Sonu's side-kick
- Champak Banerjee as Kallu
- Johnny Walker

== Soundtrack ==
#	Title	Singer(s)
1	"Mummy Bhookh Lagi"	Mohammed Aziz, Alka Yagnik
2	"Main Kali Anaar Ki"	Runa Laila
3	"Sun Sajna"	Shoba Joshi, Shrivastava V.
4	"Allah Bahut Bada Hai"	Mohammed Aziz
5	"Jo Main Chhup Jaaoon"	Mohammed Aziz, Kavita Krishnamurthy, Sonali Vajpajee
6	"Aaja Ri Tu Aaja"	Mohammed Aziz, Alka Yagnik
