= Talluri Rameswari =

Indian actress

- Born: January 6, 1958 (age 68); India
- Occupation: Actress
- Spouse: Deepak Seth

Talluri Rameswari is an Indian actress who works in Hindi and Telugu films.

== Career ==
Rameswari graduated from FTII in 1975. She got her big break in 1977 with Rajshri's Dulhan Wahi Jo Piya Man Bhaye which became a phenomenal hit and made her a household name. In 1978 she played the title role in K. Viswanath's Seetamalakshmi (Telugu) and received the Filmfare Award for Best Actress - Telugu. Some of her other notable films include Sunayana with Naseeruddin Shah, Mera Rakshak with Mithun, and Sharda and Aasha with Jeetendra. The latter earned her a Filmfare nomination as Best Supporting Actress. Rameswari has also acted in an Odia and a Malayalam movie.

== Personal life ==
Rameswari is married to her FTII classmate, Punjabi actor-producer Deepak Seth. They have two sons Bhaskara Pratap and Surya Prem. They produced a Hindi film Hum Farishte Nahin (1988) and a Punjabi film Mein Tuun Assin Tussin (2007) based on the Shakespeare play The Comedy of Errors. She took a sabbatical to raise her children and returned to acting in the 2000s. Lately, she has been working in television series.

== Filmography ==
=== Television ===
- America Ammayi
- Kairi
- Mitwa Phool Kamal Ke
- Jabb Love Hua
- Babul Ka Aangann Chootey Na
- Padosi (1985)
- Chamatkar
- Ados Pados (TV Serial)
- Nanhi Si Kali Meri Laadli (TV serial aired on DD National)
- Jhansi (2022–2023) (Disney+ Hotstar)
- Kumari Srimathi (Amazon Prime)
- Ganadevta (1987–1988) (Doordarshan)

=== Film ===
Year	Title	Role	Language	Notes
1977	Dulhan Wahi Jo Piya Man Bhaye	Kammo	Hindi	
1978	Seetamalakshmi	Seethamalakshmi	Telugu	Filmfare Award for Best Actress – Telugu
1978	Mera Rakshak	Bijli	Hindi	
1979	Mangala Thoranalu		Telugu	
1979	Sunayana	Sunayana	Hindi	
1980	Aasha	Mala	Hindi	Nominated–Filmfare Award for Best Supporting Actress
1980	Maan Abhiman		Hindi	
1980	Saajan Mere Main Saajan Ki		Hindi	
1981	Agni Pareeksha	Meeta	Hindi	
1981	Sharda	Sharda	Hindi	
1982	Aadat Se Majboor	Salma/Shanti	Hindi	
1982	Waqt Waqt Ki Baat		Hindi	
1983	Kalka	Kajri	Hindi	
1984	Ek Naya Ithihas		Hindi	
1984	Maan Maryada	Pooja	Hindi	
1985	Mujhe Kasam Hai		Hindi	
1985	Onathumbikkoroonjaal	Gracy	Malayalam	
1985	Manini		Odia	
1986	Bhai Ka Dushman Bhai		Hindi	
1987	Bhuli Huena		Odia	
1988	Pyari Bhabhi		Hindi	
1988	Hum Farishte Nahin	Komal	Hindi	
1988	Charnon Ki Saugandh	Gayatri	Hindi	
1988	Chinnodu Peddodu		Telugu	
2002	Kuch Tum Kaho Kuch Hum Kahein	Shanti	Hindi	
2003	Nijam	Shanti	Telugu	Nandi Award for Best Supporting Actress; Nominated–Filmfare Award for Best Supporting Actress – Telugu
2005	Bunty Aur Babli	Mrs. Trivedi	Hindi	
2005	Arjun	Arjun's mother	Odia	
2006	Nandanavanam 120km	Rajeswari	Telugu	
2011	F.A.L.T.U		Hindi	
2011	Sankaal - The Latch		Hindi	
2014	Rowdy Fellow		Telugu	
2024	Devara: Part 1	Jogula	Telugu	
2025	Brahma Anandam	Samarla Jyothi	Telugu	
2025	Uppu Kappurambu	Kondamma	Telugu	
2026	ENE Repeat	Keerthana’s grandmother	Telugu	
