= Esmayeel Shroff =

Indian film director and writer (1950–2022)

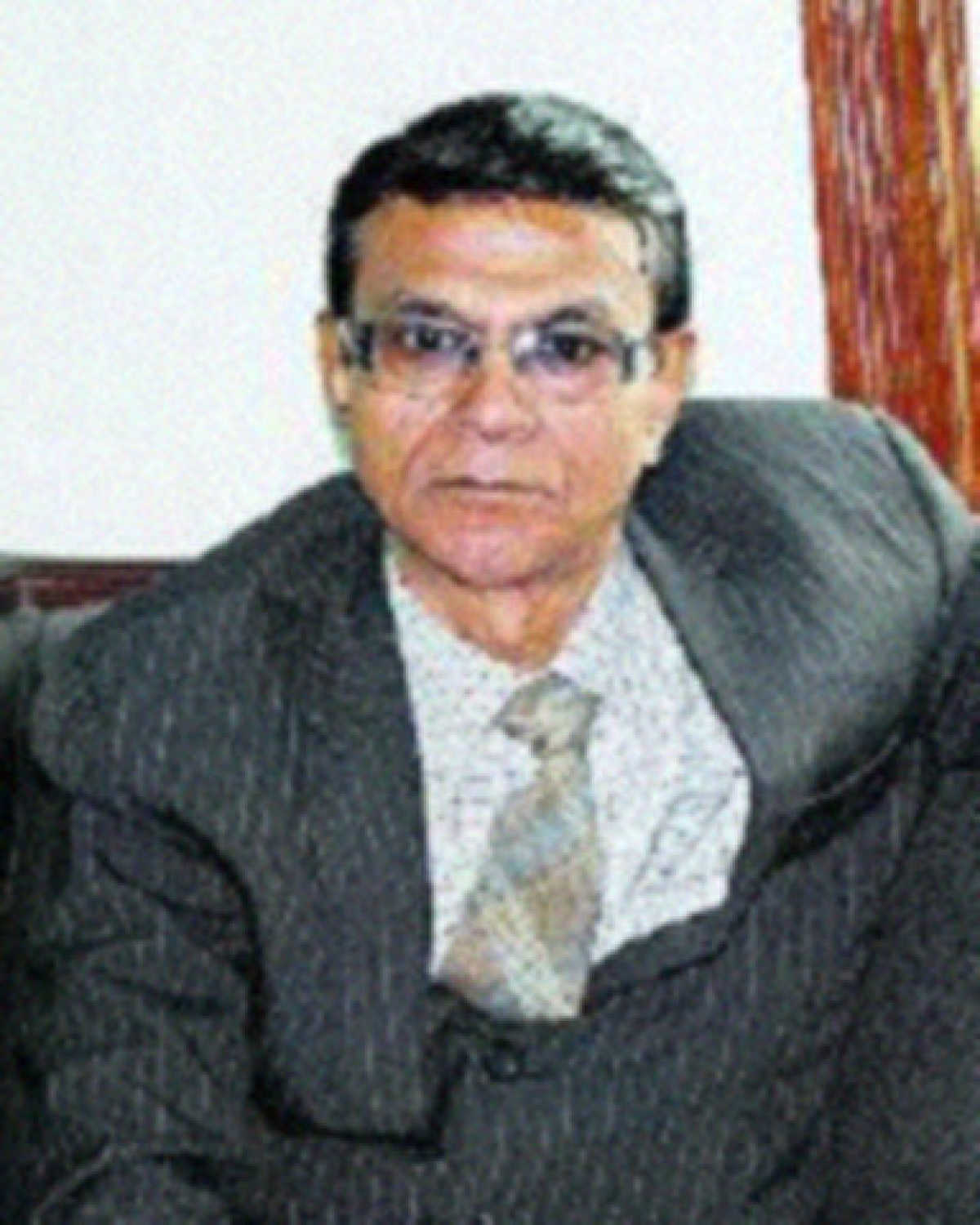
- Born: S.V. Ismail; 12 August 1950; Kurnool, Andhra Pradesh, India
- Died: 26 October 2022 (aged 72); Mumbai, Maharashtra, India
- Resting place: Mumbai, Maharashtra, India
- Education: NIT Tiruchirappalli
- Occupations: Director, writer
- Years active: 1975–2022

Esmayeel Shroff (12 August 1950 – 26 October 2022) was an Indian film director and writer, noted for his work in the Bollywood industry. His hit film Thodisi Bewafaii was famous among the crowd of the 1980s. The movie was written by his brother, Moin-Ud-Din.

== Career ==
=== Early work ===
Shroff graduated in Sound Engineering from National Institute of Technology, Tiruchirappalli. He later went to Bombay, now Mumbai, to pursue his interest in films. He worked as Assistant Director to Bheem Singh and later directed his first film Thodisi Bewafaii, followed by other films in Bollywood.

=== Breakthrough ===
Shroff directed Thodisi Bewafaii followed by Agar – If, God and Gun, Ahista Ahista, Zid, Police Public, Majhdhaar, Dil Akhir Dil Hai, Tarkieb, Bulundi, Nishchaiy, Surya and Jhuta Sach. He was directing the movie – Nazuk sa Modh which is to be shot in Delhi. "I am going to be in Delhi during the shoot and would like to see the film should move in the right direction" said Shroff while leaving Mumbai for Delhi.

== Personal life ==
Shroff died on 26 October 2022, at the age of 72 after suffering a heart attack one month earlier.

== Filmography ==
Year	Film
1977	Agar
1980	Thodisi Bewafaii
1981	Bulundi
1981	Ahista Ahista
1982	Dil ... Aakhir Dil Hai
1984	Jhutha Sach
1985	Pighalta Aasman
1986	Love 86
1989	Suryaa
1990	Police Public
1992	Nishchaiy
1994	Zid
1995	God And Gun
1996	Majhdhaar
2000	Tarkieb
2004	Thoda Tum Badlo Thoda Hum
