= Jeetendra =

Indian actor and film producer (born 1942)

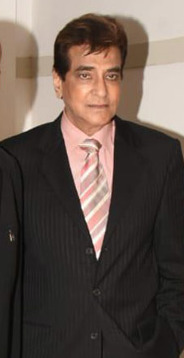
- Jeetendra in February 2020
- Born: Ravi Kapoor; 7 April 1942 (age 84); Amritsar, Punjab, British India (present–day Punjab, India)
- Other name: Jumping Jack
- Occupation: Actor
- Years active: 1959–Present
- Works: Full list
- Spouse: Shobha Kapoor (m. 1974)
- Children: Ekta Kapoor; Tusshar Kapoor
- Relatives: Abhishek Kapoor (nephew)

Ravi Kapoor, publicly known as Jeetendra is an Indian actor, producer and businessman who is known for his work in Hindi cinema. He is regarded as one of the most successful and greatest stars of Hindi cinema. He has worked in more than 200 films in a career spanning over six decades.

Jeetendra began his acting career with Geet Gaya Patharon Ne (1964). He shot to stardom in 1967 with Farz, and achieved greater success in later years, being dubbed India's "Jumping Jack" for several of his on-screen roles in Hindi films. He consistently starred in several top–grossing Indian films from the late-1960s to the 1980s, such as Jeene Ki Raah, Humjoli, Caravan, Bidaai, Udhar Ka Sindur, Dharam Veer, Swarg Narak, Jaani Dushman, Aasha, Meri Aawaz Suno, Farz Aur Kaanoon, Himmatwala, Tohfa, Maqsad, Swarag Se Sunder, Khudgarz and Thanedaar, as well as some of his acclaimed performances, include Boond Jo Ban Gayee Moti, Mere Huzoor, Dharti Kahe Pukar Ke, Parichay, Khushboo, Kinara, Priyatama, Khandaan, Takkar, Jyoti, Pyaasa Sawan and Sanjog. In the early 2000s, he founded Balaji Motion Pictures, which emerged as one of the leading production houses in Hindi cinema.

== Early life ==
Jeetendra was born in a Punjabi Hindu family as Ravi Kapoor in Amritsar, Punjab, to Amarnath and Krishna Kapoor, whose business dealt with imitation jewellery, supplied to film industry. He attended St. Sebastian Goan High School in Mumbai with his friend Rajesh Khanna and then studied at Siddharth College in Mumbai. While supplying jewellery to V. Shantaram, he was cast as Sandhya's character's double in the 1964 movie Geet Gaya Patharon Ne after which his career never looked back.

== Career ==
=== 1964–1971: Rise to stardom ===
Jeetendra began his career in 1964, playing the lead role in V. Shantaram's Geet Gaya Patharon Ne alongside Rajshree. Despite heavy promotions and positive reviews, the film proved to be an unsuccessful venture domestically. After a brief period of absence from films, he established himself with Ravikant Nagaich's spy thriller Farz in 1967. A remake of Telugu film Gudachari 116 (1966), it emerged a blockbuster at the box office and made Jeetendra a star. The music of Farz was one of the best-selling Hindi film albums of the 1960s. Majority of its songs like – "Mast Baharon Ka Main Aashiq", "Baar Baar Din Ye Aaye – Happy Birthday To You", both solos by Mohammed Rafi and "Hum To Tere Aashiq Hain", a duet by Mukesh and Lata Mangeshkar remain popular till date. In 1968, he had three releases – Suhaag Raat, Aulad and Mere Huzoor. While, Suhaag Raat and Aulad were critical and commercial success, the lattermost co-starring Raaj Kumar and Mala Sinha received positive response from reviewers and did decent business at the box office.

In 1969, Jeetendra had three major commercial successes with L. V. Prasad's Jeene Ki Raah, T. R. Ramanna's Waris and Ravikant Nagaich's Jigri Dost. He began the 1970s with a small role in Chander Vohra's Khilona which had Sanjeev Kumar and Mumtaz in the lead. The film emerged a huge hit and received praise for its premise and performances of the cast. He had another superhit that year with T. R. Ramanna's Humjoli, which was a remake of Tamil film Panakkara Kudumbam (1964). In 1971, Jeetendra starred alongside Asha Parekh in Nasir Hussain's crime thriller Caravan. The film proved to be a superhit domestically and an All Time Blockbuster in overseas markets, especially China where it went on to become the highest-grossing foreign film, surpassing Raj Kapoor's Awaara (1951). The soundtrack of Caravan composed by R. D. Burman was a huge chartbuster and one of the best-selling Hindi film albums of the 1970s.

=== 1972–1979: Career slump and return to prominence ===
Despite starting the 1970s on a successful note, Jeetendra saw a bad phase from 1972 to 1973 as majority of his films, such as Banphool (1972), Ek Hasina Do Diwane (1972), Shaadi Ke Baad (1972), Yaar Mera (1972), Roop Tera Mastana (1972), Anokhi Ada (1973) and Gehri Chaal (1973), underperformed at the box office. During this phase, he saw moderate successes in Bhai Ho To Aisa (1972) and Jaise Ko Taisa (1973) and received praise for his portrayal of a kind-hearted tuition teacher in Gulzar's light-hearted drama Parichay (1972). The song "Musafir Hoon Yaroon" from Parichay was listed at #25 in the Binaca Geetmala annual list 1973 and is considered to be one of the most loved filmi songs of all time.

In 1974, Jeetendra played the lead in L. V. Prasad's Bidaai co-starring Leena Chandavarkar and Durga Khote. The film proved to be a blockbuster at the box office thus ending his dry run and also emerging one of the top five highest-grossing films of that year. In 1975, he reunited with Gulzar for the romantic drama Khushboo. Based on Sarat Chandra Chatterjee's Bengali novel Panditmashai, it was well received by the masses as well as the critics. The following year, he delivered three more commercial successes with Suntan, Udhar Ka Sindur and Nagin (in which he played a small role).

1977 proved to be a big year for Jeetendra with many successes. He had an All Time Blockbuster in Manmohan Desai's magnum opus Dharam Veer, also starring Dharmendra, Zeenat Aman and Neetu Singh. In United Kingdom, the film had 23 shows in 5 cities. Driven by the success of Rafi's songs, the film took a record initial of £50,000 in the UK, equivalent to ₹438,140 (US$50,001.71). In addition, the film sold 32 million tickets in the Soviet Union. The huge success of Dharam Veer was followed by a superhit in J. Om Prakash's third directional venture Apnapan, co-starring Reena Roy and Sulakshana Pandit. That same year, his final collaboration with Gulzar took place for another romance film Kinara opposite Hema Malini. The film is widely remembered for its heartwarming premise and the song "Naam Gum Jayega" sung by Lata Mangeshkar and Bhupinder Singh. Jeetendra's good run continued in 1978 with a superhit in Dasari Narayana Rao's family drama film Swarg Narak which was a remake of director's own Telugu film Swargam Narakam. He also had hits in Ram Maheshwari's Karmayogi alongside Raaj Kumar and K. Bapayya's Dil Aur Deewaar co-starring Ashok Kumar. He ended the decade on a high note with one more blockbuster in Rajkumar Kohli's ensemble horror thriller Jaani Dushman and a hit in Anil Ganguly's drama film Khandaan. He also appeared in T. Rama Rao's fantasy comedy Lok Parlok, which only did average business due to it being banned at release for some time.

With continuous flow of hits from 1974 to 1979, Jeetendra solidified his star-status.

=== 1980–1990: Widespread success ===
Jeetendra reached his peak in the early-1980s and enjoyed a strong innings throughout the decade. His first release in 1980 was J. Om Prakash's drama film Aasha which went on to become a massive blockbuster and remains his biggest solo hit till date. Its soundtrack composed by Laxmikant–Pyarelal dominated the musical charts and was one of the best selling Hindi film albums of the decade. His next release was Ravi Chopra's big-budget action thriller The Burning Train in which he co-starred alongside Dharmendra, Vinod Khanna, Hema Malini, Parveen Babi and Neetu Singh. The film did not do well at the time of release, but received praise for its well-choreographed action sequences as well as performances of the cast and attained cult status in later years. After having fair runners in the form of Takkar and Nishana, he concluded the year with three back-to-back huge hits in Jyoti Bane Jwala, Judaai and Maang Bharo Sajana. In 1981, Jeetendra starred in S. V. Rajendra Singh Babu's action crime film Meri Aawaz Suno. A remake of mega hit Kannada film Antha, it ran into controversies due to its bold subject, but opened to excellent audience response and proved to be a huge blockbuster at the box office. The same year, he had a superhit in Ek Hi Bhool and couple of successes with films, such as Waqt Ki Deewar, Sharda, Jyoti, Shakka and Pyaasa Sawan. With his last few films doing extremely well at ticket counters, Jeetendra decided to produce and star in H. S. Rawail's romantic drama Deedar-E-Yaar (1982) under his home banner Tirupati Films. The film which also had Rekha, Rishi Kapoor and Tina Munim in the lead, failed to live up to the expectations and proved to be a major box office flop with minimal recovery of the investment. After this unexpected debacle, Jeetendra made a solemn vow never to return into filmmaking again. Despite the disastrous response to Deedar-E-Yaar, his other releases that year performed well commercially. He delivered a superhit in Farz Aur Kanoon, a hit film Jeeo Aur Jeene Do, followed by five more successful films, Samraat, Dharam Kanta, Insaan, Badle Ki Aag and Chorni to go with the major grossers. 1983 proved to be one of the best years of Jeetendra's career with many successes. He first starred in K. Raghavendra Rao's action comedy film Himmatwala. A remake of the Telugu film Ooruki Monagadu, it emerged a blockbuster with two songs, "Nainon Mein Sapna" and "Taki O Taki" topping the musical charts. The huge success of Himmatwala made Sridevi a big star and she formed a hit pair with Jeetendra. His other notable releases of the year were – Arpan, Nishaan, Jaani Dost, Justice Chaudhury and Mawaali. While the latter two were hits, Arpan, Nishaan and Jaani Dost ended up as moderate commercial successes.

In 1984, Jeetendra appeared in Tohfa which was a remake of Sobhan Babu starrer Telugu superhit Devatha. Tohfa like the original opened to excellent response and emerged a blockbuster as well as the highest-earner of the year. This was followed by hits in Maqsad and Qaidi later that year. 1985 also proved to be a big year for Jeetendra with four of his films emerging commercial successes, these were - Haqeeqat, Balidaan, Pataal Bhairavi and Sanjog. The following year, he added one more blockbuster in his kitty with K. Bapayya's family drama Swarag Se Sunder co-starring Mithun Chakraborty, Jaya Prada and Padmini Kolhapure. He also worked with Dilip Kumar in K. Raghavendra Rao's actioner Dharm Adhikari. Despite the presence of some of the biggest stars of the time, the film failed to live up to the expectations and ended up as an average fare. After the underperformance of Dharm Adhikari, he reunited with T. Rama Rao for Dosti Dushmani alongside Rajinikanth and Rishi Kapoor, which emerged a box office hit. He also appeared in the successful films Ghar Sansar, Sadaa Suhagan and Locket and did a guest appearance in the superhit Jaal, the same year.

In 1987, Jeetendra played the lead in Rakesh Roshan's directional debut Khudgarz. The film proved to be a hit and established Roshan's career as a director. The same year, he delivered two more commercial successes with Sindoor (in which he had a small role) and Insaaf Ki Pukar. Following a string of critical and commercial failures for the next two years, in 1990, Jeetendra starred in Raj N. Sippy's actioner Thanedaar alongside Jaya Prada, Sanjay Dutt and Madhuri Dixit. The film backed up with chartbuster music went on to become a superhit venture at the box office. Apart from Thanedaar, his other commercially successful films that year, included Souten Ki Beti, Mera Pati Sirf Mera Hai, Sheshnaag, Agneekaal and Amiri Garibi.

=== 1991–present: Later career ===
In the early-1990s, Jeetendra's star power began to wane as his subsequent releases like Begunaah (1991), Ranbhoomi (1991), Sapnon Ka Mandir (1991), Yeh Raat Phir Na Aayegi (1992), Rishta Ho To Aisa (1992) and Insaaf Ki Devi (1992) failed to do well commercially. In 1993, he starred alongside Amrita Singh and Divya Bharti in Talat Jani's Rang, which proved to be a box office hit and also his last major success as an actor.

From 1994 to 2003, Jeetendra played supporting roles in many films, but only Judge Mujrim (1997) did well commercially well while rest of them flopped. At the 48th Filmfare Awards, he received the Lifetime Achievement Award. His last Hindi film appearance till date was in Basit Khan's romantic drama Ho Jaata Hai Pyar (2005). It received negative response from reviewers and flopped at the box office. Jeetendra then appeared as a guest in the song "Deewangi Deewangi" in Farah Khan's reincarnation drama Om Shanti Om (2007).

In 2020, he made his digital debut with the romantic web series Baarish which had Sharman Joshi and Asha Negi in the lead.

== Personal life ==
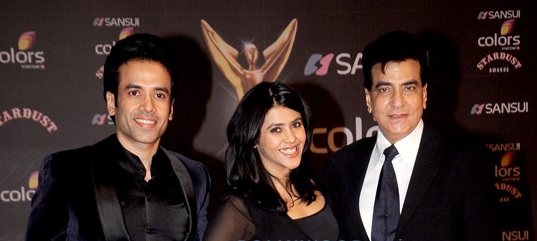
Jeetendra (right) with daughter Ekta (center) and son Tusshar (left) in 2016

Jeetendra had met his wife, Shobha, when she was only 14. She completed school, went to college and was employed as an Air Hostess with British Airways. When Jeetendra was struggling between 1960 and 1966 to establish himself as an actor, he was in a relationship with Shobha. It was not until after the release of Bidaai on 18 October 1974, that Jeetendra and Shobha decided to get married, which they did in a simple ceremony at Janki Kutir with only a few family members and friends present. In her authorised biography, Hema Malini claimed that they almost got married, but she backed out.

Jeetendra and Shobha have two children together. The oldest, daughter Ekta Kapoor, runs Balaji Telefilms while their son Tusshar Kapoor is also an actor. During an episode of The Kapil Sharma Show, when Jeetendra and Ekta Kapoor were the guests, he related an incident from 1976 where he was supposed to go to Madras (now Chennai) by flight on Karva Chauth. His flight got delayed and he went back home so that Shobha could perform the necessary rituals. Shobha refused to let him go back to the airport. So Jeetendra called his make-up man and told him to come back home, and that they would leave the next day. Around nighttime he looked outside from his flat and saw a fireball hurtling toward the airport. Later, after a couple of hours, his phone rang incessantly with people calling to find out what happened. The flight that he was supposed to have taken had crashed and was Indian Airlines Flight 171.

== Awards and honours ==
- 1998 – Guest of Honour Award at the 18th Ujala Cinema Express Awards
- 2002 – Lifetime Achievement Award at the Zee Gold Bollywood Movie Awards in New York.
- 2003 – Filmfare Lifetime Achievement Award
- 2004 – "Legend of Indian Cinema" Award at Atlantic City (United States).
- 2005 – Screen Lifetime Achievement Award
- 2008 – Sansui Television Lifetime Achievement Award
- 2012 – Zee Cine Award for Lifetime Achievement
- 2012 – Lions Gold Awards: Most Evergreen Romantic Hero

== Legacy ==
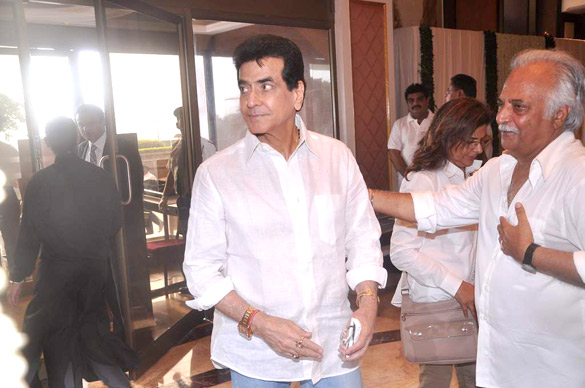
Jeetendra at Rajesh Khanna's prayer meet in 2012

One of the most successful actors of the 1970s and 1980s, Jeetendra appeared in Box Office India's "Top Actors" list seven times from 1980 to 1986.

Owing to his energetic dancing style in Farz, Jeetendra earned the sobriquet of "Jumping Jack".

In 2022, he was placed in Outlook India's "75 Best Bollywood Actors" list.
