= Nishana (1980 film) =

- Theateral release poster
- Directed by: K. Raghavendra Rao
- Written by: Chanrandas Shokh (dialogues)
- Screenplay by: K. Raghavendra Rao
- Story by: Jandhyala
- Based on: Vetagadu (1979)
- Produced by: M. Arjuna Raju; A. S. R. Anjineelu
- Starring: Jeetendra; Poonam Dhillon
- Cinematography: K. S. Prakash
- Edited by: Kotagiri Venkateswara Rao
- Music by: Laxmikant–Pyarelal
- Production company: Roja Movies
- Release date: 17 October 1980
- Running time: 135 minutes
- Country: India
- Language: Hindi

Nishana (transl. Target) is a 1980 Indian Hindi-language action film, produced by M. Arjuna Raju, A. S. R. Anjineelu under Roja Movies banner and directed by K. Raghavendra Rao. Starring Jeetendra, Poonam Dhillon and music composed by Laxmikant–Pyarelal. The film is remake of the Telugu film Vetagadu (1979). Both the movies were made under the same banner & by the same director. The tiger sequence from this movie inspired a similar sequence in the 2010 comedy Housefull.

== Cast ==
The cast is as follows:

- Jeetendra as Raja
- Poonam Dhillon as Kavita
- Prem Chopra as Premee
- Asrani as Ganesh
- Shreeram Lagoo as Thakur Pratap Singh
- Utpal Dutt as Diwanji
- Rajendra Nath as Bansilal
- Pradeep Kumar as Surya Prakash
- Om Shivpuri as Adivasi
- Jayshree Gadkar as Janaki Devi
- Mohan Choti
- Jayshree T.

== Soundtrack ==
Lyrics: Anand Bakshi

Song	Singer
"Kitni Dardbhari Yeh Baat Hai"	Lata Mangeshkar
"O Gori, Sheher Ki Chhori, Chali Kahan Nakhre Se"	Kishore Kumar, Anuradha Paudwal
"Tip Tip Hone Lagi, Jadu Chalne Lage"	Kishore Kumar, Asha Bhosle
"Jana, Zara Samne Aana, Main Bandh Raha Hoon Nishana"	Kishore Kumar, Asha Bhosle
"Apni Mohabbat Se Sab Log Jalte Hai"	Kishore Kumar, Asha Bhosle
"Maine Tujhe Jeet Liya, Tune Mujhe Jeet Liya"	Mohammed Rafi, Asha Bhosle

== Reception and legacy ==
Upon release, in November, Sunday reported the film to be in the third place among the biggest hits of the week. According to Box Office India, the final verdict of the film's box-office performance is "below average". The film was touted by the same newspaper to be among a new wave of Hindi films made by filmmakers from South India, which "revitalised the production of Hindi extravaganzas at Madras". Film World magazine was critical of the pairing between Jeetendra and Dhillon and warned the latter that "One more film like Nishana and there you will be in the dumps". Author Manisha Mishra accused the film of colourism in a 2021 research paper.

Film director Sajid Khan said that the film "has stayed with me for three decades now", and that it subconsciously inspired him while writing the script of the 2010 comedy Housefull.
