= Aasha (1980 film) =

- Theatrical release poster
- Directed by: J. Om Prakash
- Written by: Ramesh Pant (dialogues); Anand Bakshi (lyrics)
- Story by: Ram Kelkar
- Produced by: J. Om Prakash
- Starring: Jeetendra; Reena Roy; Rameshwari
- Cinematography: V Babasaheb
- Edited by: Nand Kumar
- Music by: Laxmikant Pyarelal
- Production company: Filmyug Pvt Ltd
- Release date: 21 March 1980
- Running time: 140 minutes
- Country: India
- Language: Hindi

Aasha (transl. Hope) is a 1980 Indian Hindi-language drama film, produced and directed by J. Om Prakash under the Filmyug Pvt. Ltd. banner. It stars Jeetendra, Reena Roy, Rameshwari and music composed by Laxmikant Pyarelal. The film is recorded as a "Blockbuster" at the box office. It was remade in Telugu as Anuraga Devatha (1982) and in Tamil as Sumangali (1983)

Over the years, the film has become a cult classic. Director J. Om Prakash included in Aasha (1980) the first screen appearance of his grandson Hrithik Roshan.

== Plot ==
Deepak (Jeetendra) is a truck driver who gives a lift to a famous singer Aasha (Reena Roy) when her vehicle breaks down. They become friends. Deepak is already in love with Mala (Rameshwari), whom he marries. Aasha wishes him well calling him "dost" (friend), even though she has fallen in love with him.

Deepak has an accident, and everyone believes that he is dead. His grieving mother tells a pregnant Mala to go away. Mala goes home to her father, but he dies. An upset Mala jumps from a bridge into the water. She is saved by members of a temple community but has lost her eyesight. She gives birth to a daughter and names her Deepamala, thus combining her and her husband's names.

Deepak is also alive. when he comes home his mother is overjoyed. She tells him of Mala's suicide and he becomes depressed.

Aasha re-enters Deepak's life and helps him overcome his depression. They then get engaged and also get acquainted with Deepamala, now a little girl, selling little God statues on the street. They are completely enchanted by her, though they don't know that she is Deepak's daughter.

Aasha meets Mala and offers to pay for her eye operation, so she can regain her sight. She also invites her and Deepamala to the wedding.

Mala regains her eyesight and goes to Aasha's wedding. Shocked to see Deepak, she leaves immediately, not wanting to disrupt Aasha and Deepak's life together. Mala's silent admirer (Girish Karnad) however tells Deepak that Mala is alive and that Deepamala is his daughter.

Aasha cancels the wedding, calls Deepak "dost" (friend), and tells him to reunite with his wife and daughter. Aasha goes back on stage to sing her signature song "Shisha Ho Ya Dil Ho, Aakhir Toot Jata Hai," which translates into "Whether it's glass or a heart, it will inevitably break."

== Cast ==
- Jeetendra as Deepak
- Reena Roy as Aasha
- Rameshwari as Mala
- Girish Karnad as Deepak (Mala's Friend)
- Sulochana Latkar as Deepak's Mother
- Dulari as Chachi
- Sudhir Dalvi as Pandit
- Master Bhagwan as Pinto
- Sunder as Ramlagan, Dhaba Owner
- Yunus Parvez as Yunus Bhai, Transport Owner
- Shakti Kapoor as cameo appearance

== Soundtrack ==
#	Title	Singer(s)
1	"Aashaon Ke Sawan Mein"	Mohammed Rafi, Lata Mangeshkar
2	"Dhak Dhak Se Dhadakna Sikha De"	Mohammed Rafi
3	"Jane Ham Sadak Ke Logon Se"	Mohammed Rafi
4	"Tu Ne Mujhe Bulaya"	Mohammed Rafi, Narendra Chanchal
5	"Sheesha Ho Ya Dil Ho" (This song secured 4th position in Binaca Geetmala in 1980.)	Lata Mangeshkar
6	"Tumko Salam Hai"	Mohammed Rafi, Lata Mangeshkar

== Production ==
Director-producer J. Om Prakash enlivened Aasha by having his camera crew secretly shoot without the boy's knowledge as his beloved grandson — Hrithik Roshan, who grew up to become one of India's most acclaimed superstar actors. In 1980, he was a child aged 6, who danced spontaneously while visiting grandpa's set during a song sequence. As J. Om Prakash later recounted the events:

"The song was to be shot on Jeetendra. Hrithik was on the sets, and he liked the interlude music very much and started dancing. I had asked my cameraperson and crew to be ready. I asked Hrithik if he liked the song, and he said, "Yes, Deda, it is lovely music." I replayed the music and he started dancing, and we shot it without his knowledge. When the music got over, the entire studio applauded excitingly. The remaining part of the music was to be shot in the same way with Jeetu. After Jeetu's shot was over, he came to me and said, "For God's sake don't shoot a single more shot in this film with this boy, otherwise the audience will hoot my performance!" That was a remark that came from Jeetu (Jeetendra, the male lead of Aasha and a major Hindi film star)."

== Awards ==
28th Filmfare Awards:

Nominated

- Best Film – Filmyug
- Best Director – J. Om Prakash
- Best Actress – Reena Roy
- Best Supporting Actor – Girish Karnad
- Best Supporting Actress – Rameshwari
- Best Music Director – Laxmikant–Pyarelal
- Best Lyricist – Anand Bakshi for "Sheesha Ho Ya Dil Ho"
