= Amjad Khan filmography and awards =

Amjad Khan was an Indian actor and film director. Khan was starred in almost 132 films, in a career spanning over two decades.

Khan debuted as a child actor in N. K. Ziree's 1951 film Nazneen. His first major role was in Ramesh Sippy's 1975 film Sholay, in which he played the character of iconic villain, Gabbar Singh. The following is the list of films in which he's starred, and the awards and nominations he has received in his career.

== Filmography ==
Year	Title	Role	Notes
1951	Nazneen	Child artist	Debut film, Uncredited
1955	Char Paise	Ashok	
1957	Ab Dilli Dur Nahin	Lachhu	as Amjad
1961	Maya	Ranvir's Employee	Uncredited
1973	Hindustan Ki Kasam		
1975	Sholay	Gabbar Singh	Nominated - Filmfare Award for Best Supporting Actor
1976	Charas	Robert	
1976	Ginny Aur Johnny		
1976	Vir Mangdavalo		Gujarati film
1977	Shatranj Ke Khiladi	Wajid Ali Shah	
1977	Hum Kisise Kum Naheen	Saudagar Singh	
1977	Palkon Ki Chhaon Mein	Nattu	
1977	Parvarish	Mangal Singh	
1977	Zamaanat	Rana	
1977	Ram Bharose	Bhanupratap	
1977	Kasam Khoon Ki	Bhajirao	
1977	Phir Janam Lenge Hum/Janam Janam Na Saathi		
1977	Inkaar	Raj Singh 'Kidnapper'	
1977	Chakkar Pe Chakkar	Avdhut	
1977	Aakhri Goli		
1977	Aafat	Shera	
1978	Khunnus		
1978	Ganga Ki Saugand	Thakur Jashwant Singh	
1978	Bandie	Kanchan V. Singh	Bengali debut
1978	Besharam	Digvijay Singh / Dharamdas	
1978	Kasme Vaade	Juda, the Hunchback	Guest appearance
1978	Des Pardes	Bhoot Singh / Avtar Singh	
1978	Phool Khile Hain Gulshan Gulshan	Kalandhar	
1978	Apna Khoon	Khan	
1978	Muqaddar Ka Sikandar	Dilawar	
1978	Bhookh	Thakur Harnam Singh	
1978	Ram Kasam	Chhote Thakur	
1978	Muqaddar	Sampat Seth	
1978	Khoon Ki Pukaar	Zalim Singh / Sardar	
1978	Heeralal Pannalal	Panther	
1978	Chowki No.11		
1978	Bhagyalaxmi		
1978	Sawan Ke Geet		
1979	Sarkari Mehmaan	Gul Khan	
1979	Hamare Tumhare	Mr. Chaudhary	
1979	Meera	Badshah Akbar	
1979	Mr. Natwarlal	Vikram Singh	
1979	Ahsaas	Pradeep Rai Choudhry	
1979	Suhaag	Vikram Kapoor	
1979	Lok Parlok	Ram Shastri / Boston Strangler / Raman Raghav / Ram Ghulam	
1979	Hum Tere Aashiq Hain	Thakur Shamsher Singh	
1979	Do Shikaari	Zorro	
1979	Zulm Ki Pukar		
1979	Raakhi Ki Saugandh	Jagganath 'Jagga' / Yahwar Pahwar Khan	
1979	Lakhan	Laakhan	
1979	Jaandaar	Dharamdas	
1979	Deen Aur Imaan		
1979	Dada	Fazlu	Filmfare Award for Best Supporting Actor
1979	Chambal Ki Raani		
1979	Atmaram	Sher Singh	
1980	Dadon Ka Dada		
1980	Lootmaar	Vikram	
1980	Qurbani	Inspector Amjad Khan	Nominated - Filmfare Award for Best Supporting Actor
1980	Chambal Ki Kasam	Sultan Singh/Sultana	
1980	Lahu Pukarega	Mahar	
1980	Ek Do Teen Chaar		
1980	Ram Balram	Suleiman Seth	
1980	Jwalamukhi	Daku Sher Singh	
1980	Yari Dushmani	Birju	
1980	Pyaara Dushman	Shivnath 'Shiva' 'Shivprasad'	
1980	Khoon Kharaba	Rana	
1980	Khanjar	Prince / Swamiji	
1980	Kala Pani	Shera	
1980	Bombay 405 Miles	Veer Singh	
1980	Bambai Ka Maharaja	Rajendra Singh / Suraj	
1981	Paanch Qaidi	Raja	
1981	Kanhaiyaa	Madhav Singh	
1981	Waqt Ki Deewar	Thakur Ranvir Dayal Singh	
1981	Barsaat Ki Ek Raat	Kaliram H. Sahu	
1981	Love Story	Havaldar Sher Singh	Nominated - Filmfare Award for Best Supporting Actor
1981	Chehre Pe Chehra	Kanhus, Martha's brother	
1981	Ladies Tailor	Nawab Amjad Khan	
1981	Naseeb	Damu (Damodar)	
1981	Rocky	Robert D'Souza	
1981	Laawaris	Ranvir Singh	
1981	Hum Se Badkar Kaun	Chandan / Bholaram	
1981	Jail Yatra	Kuldeep	
1981	Commander	Commander Singh	
1981	Yaarana	Bishan	Filmfare Award for Best Supporting Actor
1981	Shama	Dargah devotee	
1981	Gehra Zakhm	Shibu 'Shabbir'	
1981	Khoon Ka Rishta	Kailash Sinha	
1981	Kaalia	Shahani Seth / Jaswant	
1981	Zamane Ko Dikhana Hai	Sharif Khan / Sharafat Ali / Karamat Ali / Salamat Ali / Wajahat Ali	
1981	Professor Pyarelal	Ronnie / Ranjit Singh / Gomes	
1981	Plot No. 5	Inspector Khan	
1981	Maan Gaye Ustaad	Munna / Shera	
1981	Ladaaku		
1981	Katilon Ke Kaatil	Black Cobra	
1981	Josh		
1981	Gajara Maru		Special appearance
1981	Anusandhan		
1981	Dhuaan	Sunil's boss	
1982	Pyaara Dost	Ajab Khan'Umar Khan'	
1982	Eent Ka Jawab Patthar	Sub Inspector Maan Singh	
1982	Satte Pe Satta	Ranjit Singh	
1982	Adhura Aadmi		
1982	Dial 100	Sher Khan	
1982	Teesri Aankh	Jabbar Singh	
1982	Desh Premee	Thakur Pratap Singh	
1982	Insaan	Sher Singh 'Sheru'	
1982	Dharam Kanta	Chandan Singh / Jwala Singh	
1982	Teri Maang Sitaron Se Bhar Doon	Mohammed 'Sultan Bhai' / Sultan Singh Rathod	
1982	Samraat	Ranbir	
1982	Taqdeer Ka Badshah	Bhola / Nath	
1982	Khush Naseeb	Tiger - Gopi Prasad	
1982	Daulat	Joseph D'Souza / Tripathi	
1982	Baghavat	Maharaj Durjan Singh / Maharaj Vikram Singh	
1983	Humse Na Jeeta Koi	Bheema Singh	
1983	Nastik	Tiger	
1983	Himmatwala	Sher Singh Bandookwala	
1983	Ganga Meri Maa	Mohan	
1983	Mahaan	Vikram Singh	
1983	Jaani Dost	Hari / Nooruddin / Harry	
1983	Achha Bura	Mohammad Sher Khan / Kamalrup Chaurasiya 'Shera'	
1983	Bade Dil Wala	Bhagwat Singh (B.K.) / Dr. Joshi	
1983	Kalka	Oogra Narayan Singh	
1983	Hum Se Hai Zamana	Iqbal / Thakur's son	
1983	Chor Police	Barkhi Khan	
1984	Senurwa Bhail Mohaal		
1984	Main Qatil Hoon		
1984	Sardaar	Sardaar	
1984	Bindiya Chamkegi	Inspector Vijay Kumar	
1984	Maati Maangey Khoon	Thakur Balram Singh	
1984	Maqsad	Birju	
1984	Utsav	Vatsyayan	Nominated - Filmfare Award for Best Comedian
1984	Pet Pyaar Aur Paap		
1984	Tere Mere Beech Mein	Mamdiya	
1984	Mohan Joshi Hazir Ho!	Kundan Kapadia	
1984	Kaamyaab		
1984	Dhokebaaz	Tiger	
1985	Pataal Bhairavi	Vishvanath Chanchal	
1985	Ek Se Bhale Do	Balram / Bhima	
1985	Ameer Aadmi Gharib Aadmi	Akram	
1985	Mohabbat	Gamma Pehalwan	
1985	Ek Daku Shaher Mein	Surjan Singh	
1985	Ee Lokam Ivide Kure Manushyar	Abbas	Malayalam film
1985	Chaar Maharathi	Shakti Singh	
1985	Maa Kasam	Chakradhari	Filmfare Award for Best Performance in a Comic Role
1985	Mera Saathi	Ram Kumar's play character	
1985	Kala Suraj	Majidbhai	
1986	Vidhaan		
1986	Chameli Ki Shaadi	Advocate Harish	
1986	Singhasan	Kupateshwar	Simhasanam in Telugu
1986	Simhasanam		Telugu film
1986	Pahunche Huwe Log	Minister Satyaprakash	
1986	Andheri Raat Mein Diya Tere Haath Mein	Sultan	
1986	Love and God	Kais' family servant	
1986	Vikram	Sultan of Salamia	Tamil film
1986	Peechha Karo	Brigadier	
1986	Zindagani	Bhola	
1986	Nasihat	Bajrangi	
1986	Om		
1986	Mohabbat Ki Kasam	Baseera Singh	
1986	Mangal Dada	Pratap	
1986	Jeeva	Sardar	
1986	Bhai Ka Dushman Bhai		
1987	Mr. X	Commentary	
1987	Godna		
1987	Insaniyat Ke Dushman	Pratap Singh	
1987	Maashuka		
1987	Ahsaan		
1987	Sitapur Ki Geeta	Thakur Pratap Singh	
1987	Kaun Kitney Pani Mein		
1987	Jaago Hua Savera		
1988	Ghunghat		
1988	Kabrastan	Nepolean D'Costa	
1988	The Perfect Murder	Lala Heera Lal	
1988	Kanwarlal	John Jani Janardhan	
1988	Maalamaal	Suleiman Dada	
1988	Paigham		
1988	Qatil	Badshah Akram Khan	
1988	Paanch Fauladi	Dilawar Khan	
1988	Inteqam	Murali	
1988	Do Waqt Ki Roti	Tantia Bheel / Purshottam	
1988	Dharam Shatru		
1989	Sau Saal Baad		
1989	Meri Zabaan	Inspector Malpani / Arjun Vaswani	
1989	Bees Saal Baad	Bhavani Baba	
1989	Santosh	Qaidi No. 333	
1989	Dost	Sher Singh	
1989	Naqab	Nawab Dada Sarkar	
1989	Khuli Khidki	Dr. A.K. Jayant	
1990	Maa Kasam Badla Loonga	Wazir	
1990	Maha-Sangram	Bada Ghoda	
1990	Lekin...	Shafi Ahmed Sidiqqui	
1990	Pati Patni Aur Tawaif	Sulaiman Dildar	
1990	Danga Fasaad		
1990	Shararat		
1990	Ghar Ka Ujala		
1990	Sahasa Putrudu		Telugu film
1990	Bannada Gejje		Kannada film
1990	Prema Yuddham		Telugu film
1991	Prem Jung		
1991	Mohabbat Pehli Nazar Mein		
1991	Brahmarshi Viswamitra		Telugu film
1991	Jawahar		
1991	Pucca Badmaash	Inspector Shyamsunder JhunJhunwala	
1991	Ramgarh Ke Sholay	Gabbar Singh	
1991	Izzat	Commissioner Shamesher Singh	
1991	Love	Guruji	
1991	Yaara Dildara	Inspector De De	
1992	Dil Hi To Hai	Maharaj Vikram Singh	
1992	Aasmaan Se Gira	Alien ruler	
1992	Waqt Ka Badshah	Boss	
1992	Virodhi	Judge	
1992	Saali Adhi Ghar Waali	Ustaad Ji	Guest appearance
1992	Ele, My Friend	Omar	
1993	Chingari Aur Sholay		posthumous release
1993	Bechain		posthumous release
1993	Rudaali	Thakur Ram Avtar	posthumous release
1993	Police Wala	Judge	posthumous release
1993	Jaan Per Khel Kar		posthumous release
1994	Saboot Mangta Hain Kanoon	Ramnath	posthumous release
1994	Kaun Apna Kaun Paraya		posthumous release
1994	In Custody	Babu's Musician	English Film, posthumous release
1994	Do Fantoosh	Bajrang	posthumous release
1995	Anokhi Chaal		posthumous release
1996	Sautela Bhai	Thakur Narayandas	posthumous release
1996	Hukumnama		posthumous release
1996	Aatank	Alphonso	posthumous release
1996	Kalinga		posthumous release

== Awards and nominations ==
Year	Award	Category	Film	Result
1976	BFJA Awards	Best Supporting Actor (Hindi)	Sholay|style="background: #9EFF9E; color: #000; vertical-align: middle; text-align: center; " class="yes table-yes2 notheme"|Won	
1976	Filmfare Awards	Best Supporting Actor	style="background: #FFE3E3; color: black; vertical-align: middle; text-align: center; " class="no table-no2 notheme"|Nominated	
1980	Filmfare Awards	Best Supporting Actor	Dada|style="background: #9EFF9E; color: #000; vertical-align: middle; text-align: center; " class="yes table-yes2 notheme"|Won	
1981	Filmfare Awards	Best Supporting Actor	Qurbani|style="background: #FFE3E3; color: black; vertical-align: middle; text-align: center; " class="no table-no2 notheme"|Nominated	
1982	Filmfare Awards	Best Supporting Actor	Yaarana|style="background: #9EFF9E; color: #000; vertical-align: middle; text-align: center; " class="yes table-yes2 notheme"|Won	
1982	Filmfare Awards	Best Supporting Actor	Love Story|style="background: #FFE3E3; color: black; vertical-align: middle; text-align: center; " class="no table-no2 notheme"|Nominated	
1986	Filmfare Awards	Best Performance in a Comic Role	Utsav|style="background: #FFE3E3; color: black; vertical-align: middle; text-align: center; " class="no table-no2 notheme"|Nominated	
1986	Filmfare Awards	Best Performance in a Comic Role	Maa Kasam|style="background: #9EFF9E; color: #000; vertical-align: middle; text-align: center; " class="yes table-yes2 notheme"|Won	

== See also ==
- Amjad Khan
- Gabbar Singh, iconic villain played by Khan in Sholay
