= Nai Duniya Naye Log =

1973 film by B. R. Ishara

- Directed by: B.R.Ishara
- Starring: Danny Denzongpa
- Release date: 1973
- Country: India
- Language: Hindi

Nai Duniya Naye Log is a 1973 Bollywood drama film directed by B.R.Ishara. The film stars Reena Roy ("although Zaroorat was her first released film") and Danny Denzongpa in their first film roles.

== Cast ==
- Reena Roy ... Sandhya
- Satyen
- Danny Denzongpa
- Manmohan Krishna
- Nadira

== Production ==
The film was shot "about 50 miles from Bangalore at a spot from where a train passed only once a day. B.R. Ishara wanted to shoot a scene when the train would pass."

== Songs ==
1. "Ae Pyar Mujhe Ro Lene De, Meri Palko Ke Kinare Jalte Hai" – Suman Kalyanpur, Mukesh
2. "Mujhe Teri Baaho Me, Na Jaane Kya Milta Hai" – Asha Bhosle
3. "Do Hoonth Hile Ek Geet Suna" – Mukesh
4. "Love Can Fly" – Ursula Vaz
