= Madhosh (1974 film) =

- Poster
- Directed by: Desh Gautam
- Produced by: Tahir Hussain
- Music by: R. D. Burman
- Release date: 1974
- Running time: 2 hours 13 min
- Country: India
- Language: Hindi

Madhosh (transl. "Drunk" or "Intoxicated") is a 1974 Bollywood drama film directed by Desh Gautam. It stars Mahendra Sandhu and Aamir Khan as young Raj Kumar.

== Cast ==
- Mahendra Sandhu as Raj Kumar
- Reena Roy as Meenal
- Rakesh Roshan as Goldie
- Helen as Mona
- Johnny Walker as Gor
- Jayshree T. as Munni Bai
- Aamir Khan as younger Raj

== Music ==
R. D. Burman composed the music. The lyrics were by Majrooh Sultanpuri.

Song	Singer
"Sharabi Aankhen, Gulabi Chehra Kaisa Lage Mera"	R. D. Burman, Asha Bhosle
"Sharabi Aankhen, Gulabi Chehra Kaisa Lage Mera" (Short)	R. D. Burman, Asha Bhosle
"Mera Chhota Sa Dil Tune Chheena"	Kishore Kumar, Asha Bhosle
"Kasam Khaao Tum Ek Baar, Mere Yaar, Mere Dildaar"	Kishore Kumar, Asha Bhosle
"Jaan Mare Balmu Hamaar"	Asha Bhosle
"Nathani Meri Dole Re"	Asha Bhosle
