= Agent Vinod (1977 film) =

1977 Indian film by Deepak Bahry

- Directed by: Deepak Bahry
- Written by: Khalid-Narvi-Girish
- Produced by: Tarachand Barjatya
- Starring: Mahendra Sandhu; Nazir Hussain
- Cinematography: Arvind Laad
- Edited by: Mukhtar Ahmed
- Music by: Raam Laxman; Ravinder Rawal (lyrics)
- Production company: Sargam Pictures
- Distributed by: Rajshri Productions
- Release date: 23 July 1977
- Country: India
- Language: Hindi

Agent Vinod is a 1977 Indian Hindi-language action spy film directed by Deepak Bahry. The film stars Mahendra Sandhu as a dashing Indian secret agent and Jagdeep in a major role too as an chandu James bond . It turned out to be a surprise hit and inspired the name of a similar 2012 Hindi film.

== Story ==
The kidnapping of a prominent nuclear scientist, Ajay Saxena prompts the Chief of Secret Services to assign flamboyant Agent Vinod to this case. While on this assignment, Vinod meets with Ajay's daughter, Anju, who insists on assisting him. The duo are then further assisted by Chandu "James Bond" and his gypsy girlfriend. The two couples will soon have numerous challenges thrust on them, and will realize that their task is not only very difficult, but also life-threatening.

== Cast ==
- Mahendra Sandhu as Agent Vinod
- Asha Sachdev as Anju Saxena
- Rehana Sultan as Zarina
- Jagdeep as Chandu alias James Bond
- Iftekhar as Madanlal
- Pinchoo Kapoor as Chacha, Agent Vinod's uncle
- Nazir Hussain (credited as Nazir Husain) as Ashok Saxena, Anju's dad
- Ravindra Kapoor
- K. N. Singh as Chief of Secret Services SR Singh
- Helen as Lovelina, dancer
- Jayshree T. as Gypsy Sardar's daughter
- Leena Das as Leena (Chacha's assistant)
- Viju Khote as Damodar, Madanlal's henchman
- Sharat Saxena as Ratan, Madanlal's henchman
- Birbal as Room Service Boy
- Bhagwan Dada as Gypsy Sardar
- V. Gopal as Hotel Manager
- Sunder as Priest

== Music ==
No.	Title	Singer(s)	Length
1.	"Sabse Nirala Rangila Dil Wala, Mai Jhoka Pyar Ka"	Kishore Kumar
2.	"Yara Dildara Tera Yeh Ishara"	Usha Mangeshkar, Dilraj Kaur
3.	"Band Kamare Mein Ek Ladaki Akeli"	Asha Bhosle
4.	"Hum To Nikle Ram Bharose, Phirte Yahan Wahan"	Mahendra Kapoor, Jaspal Singh
5.	"Loveleena Aa Gaya Mai, Tu Aa Gaya Toh Jaanejaa Baaho Me Tham Le"	Shailendra Singh, Asha Bhosle
6.	"Mehfil Me Aaye Ho Aapka Dil Jaan Jaaynge"	Manna Dey, Asha Bhosle
