= Aakhri Goli =

1977 Indian Hindi film

- Directed by: Shibu Mitra
- Produced by: Iqbal Bagga; Krishna Bagga
- Starring: Sunil Dutt; Leena Chandavarkar
- Music by: Kalyanji-Anandji
- Distributed by: Bobby Arts International
- Release date: 1977
- Country: India
- Language: Hindi

Aakhri Goli is a 1977 Bollywood action film directed by Shibu Mitra. It stars Sunil Dutt and Leena Chandavarkar. The music was composed by Kalyanji-Anandji.

== Cast ==
- Sunil Dutt as Vikram Singh / Sher Singh
- Leena Chandavarkar as Suman Singh
- Farida Jalal as Indu Singh
- Nirupa Roy as Janki Singh
- Ajit as Thakur Mahendra Pratap Singh
- Amjad Khan as Sardar Veerendra Pratap Singh
- Om Prakash as Major Chaudhary Keerti Singh
- Urmila Bhatt as Suchitra Singh

== Soundtrack ==
Song	Singer
"O Daddy Ji, Bolo Mera Beta Ji, Yeh Hai Hamara Zamana"	Kishore Kumar; Mahendra Kapoor
"Chand Sa Khilona"	Suman Kalyanpur
"Kaise Keh Doon Mujhe"	Asha Bhosle
"Ek Baat Batane Aayi Hoon"	Asha Bhosle
