= Khoon Ki Keemat =

- Directed by: Shibu Mitra
- Produced by: Jagdish Sharma
- Starring: Mahendra Sandhu
- Production company: Veena Films
- Release date: 3 May 1974
- Running time: 2 hours 6 min
- Country: India
- Language: Hindi

Khoon Ki Keemat is a 1974 Hindi-language thriller drama film directed by Shibu Mitra and produced by Jagdish Sharma. The film stars Ashok Kumar and Mahendra Sandhu.

== Cast ==
- Ashok Kumar as John Fernandes
- Mahendra Sandhu as Deepak
- Neelam Mehra as Chanda
- Mehmood as Truck Driver
- Roopesh Kumar as Thakur
- Bharat Bhushan
- Aruna Irani as Billo

== Music ==
1. "Hai Kismat Se Ye Mehfil Milti" - Asha Bhosle, Kishore Kumar
2. "Kaun Hai Tu Ye Jaan Liya" - Asha Bhosle
3. "Ari O Champa Chameli" - Asha Bhosle
4. "Beet Gaye Hai Kitne Zamaane" - Asha Bhosle
5. "Idher Aa Let Ja" - Minoo Purushottam, Kishore Kumar
