= Dhanwan (1981 film) =

- Poster
- Directed by: Surendra Mohan
- Produced by: Sohanlal Kanwar
- Starring: Rajesh Khanna; Reena Roy; Rakesh Roshan; Aruna Irani; Om Prakash
- Music by: Hridaynath Mangeshkar; Sahir Ludhianvi (lyrics)
- Release date: 24 July 1981
- Country: India
- Language: Hindi

Dhanwan is a 1981 Hindi film starring Rajesh Khanna in the lead role, paired opposite Reena Roy and produced by Sohanlal Kanwar. The supporting cast includes Aruna Irani, Rakesh Roshan, Shakti Kapoor, Om Prakash and Vijayendra Ghatge. Rakesh Roshan was nominated for the Best Supporting Actor at the Filmfare Awards, the only one for the film. Reena Roy plays the role of a defiant widow who reforms the egotistical Rajesh Khanna in the film. Music is by Hridayanath Mangeshkar and Lyrics by Sahir Ludhianvi.

== Synopsis ==
Vijay is a very proud rich man who thinks money can buy anything. He harbors love for Asha and tries to win her over, but she rejects him for his arrogance. He gets angry as well as disappointed when Asha marries an accounting clerk instead. Soon after, he is involved in car accident in which he loses his eyesight completely, and the doctor thinks Vijay will need a new pair of eyes. Vijay orders eyes, but it isn't as simple as Vijay thought, the doctor explains to him that it's difficult to find an eye donor. That is when Vijay realizes that money cannot buy everything in life. Then he starts believing in God and starts chanting prayers. Only a few days later, he finds a donor and his eyes are operated upon. Now Vijay can see and he also has realized that money is indeed very useless in certain circumstances.

On inquiry, he learns that the eyes implanted on him are of Anil, his accounts clerk and the person who married Asha. Now Asha is a widow as Anil has been executed after being falsely implicated in a case of theft. It now becomes the aim of the now big hearted generous tycoon Vijay to protect Asha and find the truth as to how Anil got into trouble and to prove the world that Anil was innocent.

== Cast ==
- Rajesh Khanna as Vijay Kumar Saxena
- Reena Roy as Asha Nath
- Rakesh Roshan as Anil Verma
- Shakti Kapoor as Dara
- Om Prakash as Jummaddin Khan
- Aruna Irani as Pathan's wife

== Music ==
1. "Idhar Aa Aa Bhi Jaa" – Kishore Kumar
2. "Maro Bhar Bharke Pichkari" – Kishore Kumar, Usha Mangeshkar
3. "Yeh Ankhein Dekh Kar" – Lata Mangeshkar, Suresh Wadkar
4. "Kuchh Log Mohabbat Ko" – Lata Mangeshkar
5. "Balle Balle Bhai Reshmi Dupatta" – Lata Mangeshkar, Mahendra Kapoor
6. "Maro Bhar Bharke Pichkari (Version 2)" – Kishore Kumar, Usha Mangeshkar

== Reception ==
It received four stars in the Bollywood guide Collections.
