= Khoon Ki Takkar =

1981 Hindi film

- Directed by: Harish Chawla
- Produced by: P. K. Sharma; Surinder Mohan
- Starring: Vinod Mehra; Mahendra Sandhu; Zarina Wahab
- Music by: Sonik Omi
- Release date: 1981
- Country: India
- Language: Hindi

Khoon Ki Takkar is a 1981 Hindi-language action drama film directed by Harish Chawla and produced by P. K. Sharma and Surinder Mohan. The film stars Vinod Mehra, Mahendra Sandhu, and Zarina Wahab in lead roles. This film was released under the banner of Golden Star Movies. Music direction was done by Sonik Omi.

== Plot ==
Rajan, the son of Thakur Pratap Singh, loves Rajjo, a nurse in a hospital. Thakur Pratap Singh, a landlord, opposes their relationship. Rajan learns that his stepbrother Sheroo is also in love with Rajjo. So he decides to sacrifice his love.

== Cast ==
- Vinod Mehra as Rajan
- Mahendra Sandhu as Sheroo
- Zarina Wahab as Rajjo
- Neeta Mehta as Sapna
- Ranjeet as Goga
- Om Shivpuri as Thakur Pratap Singh
- Manmohan Krishna as Rahim Chacha
- Chand Usmani as Shakuntala
- Sudha Shivpuri as Shanti
- Baby Pallavi as Rajju

== Soundtrack ==
Music direction of the film was done by Sonik Omi and lead singers of this film were Mohammed Rafi, Asha Bhosle, Amit Kumar, Aarti Mukherjee and Chandrani Mukherjee.

Song	Singer
"Ae, Tu Kya Hai"	Asha Bhosle
"Teri Meri Mohabbat"	Asha Bhosle, Aarti Mukherjee
"Teri Meri Mohabbat"	Asha Bhosle, Mohammed Rafi
"Tu Been Baja Sajna"	Asha Bhosle, Mohammed Rafi
"Hum Do Shareef"	Amit Kumar, Mohammed Rafi
"Mata Rani, Tere Darbaar Jagmag Jyoti Jale"	Narendra Chanchal, Aarti Mukherjee, Chandrani Mukherjee
