= Raakhi Ki Saugandh =

- Directed by: Shibu Mitra
- Starring: Vinod Mehra; Amjad Khan; Ranjeet; Madan Puri; Ajit; Helen
- Music by: Sonik Omi
- Release date: 19 October 1979
- Country: India
- Language: Hindi

Raakhi Ki Saugandh is a 1979 Bollywood film directed by Shibu Mitra.

== Cast ==
- Vinod Mehra as CID Inspector Shankar Verma
- Amjad Khan as Jagannath "Jagga" / Yahwar Pahwar Khan
- Ranjeet as Ranjeet
- Madan Puri as Bachchan Singh
- Ajit as Chamanlal
- Helen as Sweety
- Sarika as Paro / Tina
- Jayshree T. as Champa Bai
- Meena T. as Munni
- Jankidas as Paro's Father-in-law
- Rajan Haksar as Georgy Dada

== Soundtrack ==
Song	Singer
"Pehli Pehli"	Asha Bhosle
"Jeena Chahe"	Asha Bhosle
"I Like You"	Asha Bhosle; Manna Dey
"Tu Aashiq Hai"	Asha Bhosle; Mahendra Kapoor
