= Jaise Ko Taisa =

- Theatrical release poster
- Directed by: M. Murugan - M. Kumaran
- Written by: Pt. Mukhram Sharma (dialogues)
- Based on: Bhale Jodi (1970)
- Produced by: M. Saravanan; M. Balasubramanian; M. S. Guhan
- Starring: Jeetendra; Reena Roy; Srividya
- Music by: R. D. Burman
- Production company: AVM Productions
- Release date: 1973
- Running time: 139 minutes
- Country: India
- Language: Hindi

Jaise Ko Taisa (transl. Tit for tat) is a 1973 Indian Hindi-language comedy film, produced by M. Saravanan, M. Balasubramanian and M. S. Guhan under the AVM Productions banner and directed by producers AVM Murugan and AVM Kumaran. It stars Jeetendra, Reena Roy and music composed by R. D. Burman. The film is a remake of 1970 Kannada film Bhale Jodi.

== Cast ==
- Jeetendra as Vijay / Vinod (Double Role)
- Reena Roy as Roopa
- Srividya as Radha
- Kamini Kaushal as Vijay's Mother
- Anwar Hussain as Shyamlal "Mamaji"
- Ramesh Deo as Prakashchand "Pashi"
- Mohan Choti as Gopal (Clerk)
- Dinesh Hingoo as Bhim (Cook)
- Rojaramani as Munni
- Poornam Viswanathan as Judge for Bike Race

== Soundtrack ==
All lyrics are written by Anand Bakshi.

No.	Title	Singer(s)	Length
1.	"Sajan Kahan Jaungi Main"	Lata Mangeshkar
2.	"Ab Ke Sawan Mein Ji Dare, Rimjhim Tan Pe Pani Gire"	Kishore Kumar, Lata Mangeshkar
3.	"Kaun Si Hai Woh Cheez Jo Yahan Nahin Milti"	Kishore Kumar, Asha Bhosle
4.	"Bhaiya Re, Bhaiya Re, Paap Ki Naiya Re, Beech Talaiya Re"	Kishore Kumar, Asha Bhosle
5.	"Chalte Chalte Peechhe Mudke"	Kishore Kumar
6.	"Jaise Ko Taisa Mila"	Kishore Kumar
