= Bhale Jodi (1970 film) =

1970 film

- DVD cover
- Directed by: Y. R. Swamy
- Screenplay by: Y. R. Swamy
- Story by: Javar Seetharaman
- Starring: Rajkumar; Bharathi
- Cinematography: R. Madhu
- Edited by: R. Hanumantha Rao
- Music by: R. Rathna
- Production company: Rajkamal Arts
- Release date: 1970
- Running time: 172 minutes
- Country: India
- Language: Kannada

Bhale Jodi (transl. Wonderful couple) is a 1970 Indian Kannada language drama film written and directed by Y. R. Swamy. It stars Rajkumar in dual roles with Bharathi and Dinesh in other lead roles. The film was based on the story written by Jawar Seetharaman and was produced under Rajkamal Arts banner. The movie was remade in Telugu in 1972 as Bullema Bullodu starring Chalam and in Hindi in 1973 as Jaise Ko Taisa. He appeared as Echchamanayaka in a small drama sequence in the movie.

This movie is dedicated to Singanalluru N Puttaswamayya [Father of Dr.Rajkumar].

The movie is shot in Glen Morgan Estate of Ooty.

== Cast ==
- Rajkumar as Suresh / Ramesh
- Bharathi as Suneetha
- Dinesh as Raghava / Papachchi
- B. V. Radha as Mangala
- Balakrishna as Papachchi's father
- Pandari Bai as Suresh mother
- Nagappa as Lakshmipati
- Kupparaj
- B Mallesh as Doctor Nanjundayya
- Bhatti Mahadevappa (as co-actor in the drama (Tiruvenkata))
- Ganapathi Bhat (Seth Lalchand)
- Shyam as Ramanna
- Shani Mahadevappa as Lawyer
- Raghavan
- Baby Sunitha as Saroja
- Baby Navitha

== Soundtrack ==
The music of the film was composed by R. Rathna and lyrics for the soundtrack written by Chi. Udaya Shankar and R. N. Jayagopal. The album consists of six soundtracks.

Tracklist
No.	Title	Lyrics	Singer(s)	Length
1.	"Amma Amma"	Chi. Udaya Shankar	P. B. Sreenivas	3:20
2.	"Nanna Kanasina Raaniye"	Chi. Udaya Shankar	P. B. Sreenivas	3:28
3.	"Aalisu O Iniya (1)"	R. N. Jayagopal	S. Janaki	4:07
4.	"Navile Navile"	R. N. Jayagopal	L. R. Eswari	4:01
5.	"Manikyadantha Maavayya"	Chi. Udaya Shankar	P. B. Sreenivas, L. R. Eswari	4:02
6.	"Aalisu O Iniya (2)"	R. N. Jayagopal	S. Janaki	4:02
Total length:				22:58
