= Chand Usmani =

Indian actress (1933–1989)

- Born: Chand Bibi Khanum Usmani; 3 January 1933; Agra, United Provinces, British India (now in Uttar Pradesh, India)
- Died: 26 November 1989 (aged 56); Mahim, Mumbai, Maharashtra, India
- Occupation: Actress
- Years active: 1953–1987
- Spouse: Mukul Dutt
- Awards: Filmfare Best Supporting Actress Award for Pehchaan (1971)

Chand Usmani (born Chand Bibi Khanum Usmani; 3 January 1933 – 26 November 1989) was an Indian actress in Hindi films from the 1950s to the late 1980s. She won the 1971 Filmfare Award for Best Supporting Actress. She is best remembered for playing self-sacrificing wives and mothers.

== Biography ==
Chandbibi Khanam Usmani was born on 3 January 1933 in Agra, Uttar Pradesh, into a Pashtun family. She married Mukul Dutt (director of Aan Milo Sajna), with whom she had a son, Roshan. She ran a halfway house at her home in Mahim for runaway girls who had come to Mumbai seeking a career in films. She died in Mumbai on 26 November 1989.

== Career ==
Chand Usmani came to notice by participating in a talent contest called 'Kardar-Kolynos-Teresa Contest' in 1949, winning second place. In 1953, she debuted as the heroine in Jeewan Jyoti opposite Shammi Kapoor (his debut too). She also starred in Barati, Baap Re Baap and Samrat Prithviraj Chauhan, and had major roles in several other films, including Rangeen Raten, Naya Daur, Prem Patra and Pehchan.
She received much critical acclaim: a review of Rangeen Raten (1956) said that she "gives a brilliant performance; hers is also the best developed character, and as a result she becomes the life and soul of the film." In Baap Re Baap, a key scene is noted for "the joy exhibited by Usmani on screen". The Film Heritage Foundation of India describes her as the "effervescent Chand Usmani, with her heart-warming smile". She won a Filmfare Award for Best Supporting Actress in 1971, for her portrayal of the character Champa, a prostitute, in the 1970 film Pehchan. Writing nearly 40 years later, The Hindu's film reviewer considered that "Chand Usmani does justice to Champa's role displaying restraint, poise and grace in a role which provided ample opportunity to easily go over the top." Despite having a long career, she said in an interview with Tabassum that she regretted not having an agent/manager, which led to her not getting diverse roles and not having more success. In many of her roles, she played a self-sacrificing wife, mother, girlfriend or sister, as summed up by Mahasweta Devi in her 1986 short story 'The Wet-Nurse':

"Jashoda was a true example of Indian womanhood. She was typical of a chaste and loving wife and devoted mother, ideals which defy intelligence and rational explanation, which involve sacrifice and dedication stretching the limits of imagination, and which have been kept alive in the popular Indian psyche through the ages, beginning with Sati-Savitri-Sita right down to Nirupa Roy and Chand Usmani in our times."

== Partial filmography ==
Year	Title	Role	Notes
1953	Jeewan Jyoti	Kishori	
1954	Barati	Sundar's sister	
1955	Baap Re Baap	Kokila	
1955	Amanat	Meena	
1956	Rangeen Raten	Kamala	
1957	Abhimaan	Kiran	
1957	Duniya Rang Rangeeli	Radha	
1957	Naya Daur	Manju	
1958	Sanskar		
1958	Naya Paisa		
1959	Samrat Prithviraj Chauhan	Samyukta	
1959	Do Behnen	Rekha	
1959	Aangan		
1961	Ramu Dada		
1961	Zamana Badal Gaya		
1962	Zindagi Aur Hum		
1962	Banke Sanwaria		
1962	Prem Patra	Sumitra	
1963	Laakho Vanzaro		Gujarati film
1964	His Highness		
1964	Shagoon	Mrs. Rai	
1964	Haqeeqat	Ram Singh's girlfriend	
1964	Aprilfool	Mrs. Brijlal Sinha	
1964	Kohraa		
1964	Shehnai	Salma	
1965	Azmat-e-Islam		
1966	Mohabbat Zindagi Hai	Lajjo	
1966	Daadi Maa		
1967	Milan Ki Raat	Savitri Singh	
1967	Ghar Ka Chirag		
1967	Anita	Bela	
1967	Aman	Hiroka	
1968	Baazi	Maya	
1968	Jawab Ayega		
1968	Aanchal Ke Phool	Rani	
1969	Mr. Murder		
1969	Jiyo Aur Jeene Do		
1969	Do Bhai	Ranjana Singh / Ranjana Verma	
1969	Balak	Rekha's mother	
1970	Khilona		Laxmi Singh
1970	Pehchan	Champa	Won - Filmfare Award for Best Supporting Actress
1971	Nanhi Kaliyan		
1971	Seema		
1971	Hulchul	Shekhar's wife	
1972	Raaste Kaa Patthar	Mrs. Choudhary	
1972	Zindagi Zindagi	Leela	
1973	Agni Rekha	Maya	
1974	Dost		Guest Appearance
1974	Resham Ki Dori	Shanti	Uncredited
1974	Ujala hi Ujala	Anuradha's Mother	
1974	Faslah	Radha Chandra	
1975	Khel Khel Mein	Mrs. Anand	
1976	Raakhi Aur Rifle		
1976	Meera Shyam		
1976	Kadambari	Amit's mother	
1976	Jai Mahalaxmi Maa		
1976	Bhala Manus	Anand's Real mother	
1976	Bhagwan Samaye Sansar Mein	Eknath's mother	
1977	Parvarish	Radha Singh	
1977	Darinda		
1977	Zamaanat	Parvati	
1977	Videsh	Palanpur's Maharani	
1977	Tinku	Mrs. Jwala Prasad	
1977	Dharam Veer	Mrs. Roopmati Singh	
1977	Ab Kya Hoga	Rajesh's Mother	
1977	Hatyara	Shanta D. Singh	
1978	Parmatma		
1978	Nawab Sahib	Begum	
1978	Apna Khoon		
1979	Pehredaar		
1979	Ahsaas		
1979	Lakhan	Maharani	
1979	Chambal Ki Raani		
1979	Mai Ka Lal		Bhojpuri film
1980	Jal Mahal	Shanti	
1980	Phir Wohi Raat	Asha's Mother	
1980	Lahu Pukarega	Sarla's Mother	
1980	Oh Bewafa	Radha's Aunty	
1980	Ganga Aur Suraj		
1981	Kasam Bhawani Ki		
1981	Saajan Ki Saheli	Chanda	
1981	Mangalsutra	Satyavati Prasad	
1981	Dahshat	Sameer's Mother	
1981	Sannata		
1981	Yaarana		
1981	Khoon Ki Takkar	Shakuntala	
1982	Arth	School Administrator	
1982	Khush Naseeb	Mrs. Geeta D. Sharma	
1982	Daulat	Mrs. Choudhary	
1983	Pukar	Saraswati	
1983	Lal Chunariya	Ratnabai	
1983	Bekaraar	Laxmi	
1984	Senurwa Bhail Mohaal		
1984	Raja Aur Rana	Vijay, Shakti's mother	
1985	Ganga Ke Paar		
1985	Dil Ek Musafir		
1985	Aandhi-Toofan	Mrs. Singh	
1985	Ulta Seedha	Mrs. Roy	
1985	Mehak		
1985	Awara Baap		
1985	Yaar Kasam		
1985	Vairi-Jatt	Reshma's mother	
1985	Patthar Dil	Devki	
1986	Swarthi		
1986	Adhikar (1986 film)	Doctor	
1987	Dilruba Tangewali		
1987	Anjaam	Malti	
1987	Sitapur Ki Geeta	Mrs. Yashoda Singh	
1987	Hamari Jung		
1988	Insaaf Ki Manzil		
1988	Jatt Soormay	Mother	Punjabi film
1988	Zakhmi Aurat	Mrs. Prakash	
1988	Mar Mitenge	Akbar's grandmother	
1989	Nishane Bazi		
1989	Elaan-E-Jung	Villager	
1989	Naqab		
1989	Indira	Mrs. Pratap Rai	
1989	Aakhri Muqabla	Tripti's mother	
1990	Aag Aur Angaray		
1990	Maula Jatt	Taro	Punjabi film
1990	Lohe Ke Haath		Posthumously Released
1990	Amiri Garibi	Radha	Posthumously Released
1992	Rajoo Dada		Posthumously Released
1992	Waqt Ka Badshah	Aunty	Posthumously Released
2008	Yaar Meri Zindagi		Posthumously Released
