= Shibu Mitra =

Indian film director and producer (born 1948)

- Born: 25 March 1948 (age 78); Kolkata, West Bengal, India
- Occupation: Film director
- Years active: 1972–2001

Shibu Mitra is an Indian film director and producer. His career spans more than 40 feature films in Bollywood, and his movies were particularly popular in the late 1970s and throughout the 1980s, the most successful among them being Shankar Dada, Aakhri Goli, Paanch Qaidi, Ilzaam, Aag Hi Aag, Paap Ki Duniya, Insaaf Main Karoongaa, Maan Gaye Ustaad and Durgaa.

== Early life ==
Shibu was born in a Bengali family to Suresh Chandra and Suruchi Mitra in Kolkata on 25 March 1948. His father was a lawyer, and his mother a school principal. Both of his brothers pursued careers in law, while Shibu's was drawn towards a career in Bollywood, joining the Film and Television Institute of India (FTII Pune).

== Career ==
After graduating from FTII Pune, Shibu worked as an assistant to veteran Basu Chatterjee. He received training in commercial film-making from him and soon went on to direct his first venture Bindiya Aur Bandook, a low-budget movie starring newcomer Kiran Kumar and Asha Sachdev which went on to become a huge blockbuster and was among the biggest hits of 1972, gaining him recognition within the industry.

Shibu Mitra has worked on films which launched a number of Bollywood stars, including Govinda, Chunky Pandey, Neetu Singh (as Heroine), Danny Dengzongpa, Kiran Kumar, and Raza Murad. In recognition of his contribution to the Indian film industry he was awarded the "Star Maker of the Decade" Award at the Eighteenth Filmgoers Award in 1987.

== Filmography ==
- 1972: Bindiya Aur Bandook
- 1974: Shatranj Ke Mohre
- 1974: Khoon Ki Keemat
- 1975: Zorro
- 1976: Shankar Dada
- 1977: Aakhri Goli
- 1979: Raakhi Ki Saugandh
- 1980: Kaala Pani
- 1980: Bambai Ka Maharaja
- 1981: Paanch Qaidi
- 1981: Maan Gaye Ustaad
- 1982: Sumbandh
- 1983: Mujhe Vachan Do
- 1983: Humse Na Jeeta Koi
- 1984: Yadoon Ki Zanjeer
- 1984: Raja Aur Rana
- 1984: Inteha
- 1985: Insaaf Main Karoongaa
- 1985: Durgaa
- 1985: Maa Kasam
- 1986: Ilzaam
- 1987: Sitapur Ki Geeta
- 1987: Kaun Kitney Pani Mein
- 1987: Aag Hi Aag
- 1988: Paap Ki Duniya
- 1988: Gunahon Ka Faisla
- 1989: Paanch Paapi
- 1989: Meri Zabaan
- 1989: Kasam Vardi Kee
- 1989: Aakhri Ghulam
- 1990: Badnam
- 1990: Aaj Ke Shahenshah
- 1990: Naaka Bandi
- 1992: Priya
- 1993: Veertaa
- 1994: Prem Shakti
- 1996: Jagannath
- 1998: Zanjeer
- 2001: Kasam
