= Khoon Khoon =

- Directed by: Mohammed Hussain
- Written by: Vrajendra Gaur
- Produced by: F. C. Mehra
- Starring: Mahendra Sandhu; Danny Denzongpa; Rekha
- Release date: August 24, 1973
- Running time: 2 hours 7 min
- Country: India
- Language: Hindi

Khoon Khoon is a 1973 Indian Hindi-language action thriller film directed by Mohammed Hussain and stars Mahendra Sandhu, Danny Denzongpa and Rekha in lead roles. It is a remake of the Clint Eastwood film Dirty Harry.

== Plot ==
A psychopathic killer goes on killing throughout the city. He terrorizes the city and throws challenge to the police force. A tough cop Anand investigates the case and starts hunting for the killer to save his potential victims.

== Cast ==
- Danny Denzongpa as Raghav
- Mahendra Sandhu as Anand
- Rekha as Rekha
- Faryal as Dancer
- Murad as Police commissioner
- Helen
- Jagdeep as Pancham

== Songs ==
1. "Teri Meri Meri Teri Acchi Hui Dosti" - Kishore Kumar, Sushma Shrestha, Jayashree Shivaram
2. "Kitni Thandi Pawan" - Tirath Singh, Asha Bhosle
3. "Maati Ke Jalte Deepak Ki Jyot" - Mohammed Rafi
4. "Meri Aankho Me Masti Hai" - Vijay Singh, Asha Bhosle
