= Alibaba Marjinaa =

1977 Bollywood film

- Directed by: Kedar Kapoor
- Starring: Urmila Bhatt and Birbal
- Cinematography: Arvind Laad
- Edited by: Mukhtar Ahmed
- Music by: Usha Khanna
- Release date: 2 July 1977
- Country: India
- Language: Hindi

Alibaba Marjinaa is a 1977 Bollywood film directed by Kedar Kapoor. The film stars Prem Krishen as Alibaba and Tamanna as Marjina

The movie is loosely based on the Arabian Nights tale of Alibaba and 40 Thieves but takes only a few plot elements from the source

== Cast ==
- Prem Krishen as Alibaba
- Tamanna as Marjinaa
- Urmila Bhatt as Alibaba's mother
- Birbal as Gulfam
- Jagdeep as Mustafa (Cobbler)
- Pinchoo Kapoor as Hakim-e-Aala Afsal Baig
- Shakti Kapoor as Nasir
- Javed Khan
- Viju Khote as Qasim
- Madhu Malhotra as Naseem
- Ram Mohan as Taimur Baig
- Paintal as Khairu
- Amrish Puri as Jabbar
- D.K. Sapru as Badshah
- Sharat Saxena as Aslam
- Sajjan
- Murad
- Anand Joshi
- Rajan Kapoor
- Kirti Kumar
- Jugnu
- Pardesi
- Ravi Kotru
- Chandu Allhabadi
- Ghanshyam
- Ravi Joshi
- Ritu Kamal
- Madhu Chauhan
- Shushma Pandit
- Uma Dhawan

== Soundtrack ==
Alibaba Marjinaa

Soundtrack album by Usha Khanna
- Released: 1977
- Genre: Feature film soundtrack
- Label: Polydor

All lyrics are written by Kulwant Jani.

No.	Title	Singer(s)	Length
1.	"Main Alibaba"	K. J. Yesudas
2.	"Basre Ki Hur"	Asha Bhosle
3.	"Aaye Jo Kisi Ke Kaam"	Shailendra Singh
4.	"Main Hoon Kafir Mast Hasina"	Asha Bhosle and Anuradha Paudwal
5.	"Hai Hai Hai Maar Dala"	Shatrugan Sinha and Sulakshana Pandit
6.	"Gulbadan Aa Gayee"	Asha Bhosle
7.	"Aa Gaya Deewana"	K. S. Yesudas
8.	"Gulistan Se"	Asha Bhosle
