= Baap Re Baap (1955 film) =

- Directed by: A. R. Kardar
- Written by: S. N. Banerjee & Jagdish Kanwal (dialogues)
- Produced by: A. R. Kardar
- Starring: Kishore Kumar; Chand Usmani
- Cinematography: Dwarka Divecha
- Edited by: M. S. Hajee
- Music by: C. Ramchandra (uncredited); O. P. Nayyar
- Production company: Kardar Productions
- Release date: 30 September 1955
- Running time: 110 minutes
- Country: India
- Language: Hindi

Baap Re Baap (My God!) is a 1955 Hindi family comedy drama film, produced and directed by A. R. Kardar. Produced under the Kardar Productions banner, it had dialogues by S. N. Bannerjee and Jagdish Kanwal. The music of the film was composed by C. Ramchandra (uncredited) and O. P. Nayyar separately with the lyrics written by Jan Nisar Akhtar.

The film's male lead role was initially offered to Raj Kapoor who had previously played the lead in Kardar's film Dastan (1950) but Kishore Kumar was eventually cast in it. Baap Re Baap, a musical comedy, was a great success and brought a big improvement in the career of Kishore Kumar. He acted in a total of sixty-eight films from 1953 to 1968.

The film starred Kishore Kumar, Chand Usmani in lead roles, supported by Smriti Biswas, Jayant, Ulhas, Leela Mishra.

== Plot ==
Ashok Sagar has just returned from abroad after seven years and now lives with his overly protective parents. His one sneeze is treated as if he has pneumonia. After Ashok hears the singing of a girl Kokila who sells flower for living, he falls in love with her, while his parents are busy trying to find a suitable bride for him. For this purpose they give an advertisement, which attracts people from various states with differing languages. They all land up at Ashok's house. His parents settle his marriage with Roopa, who comes from a wealthy family. Ashok runs away from home and makes his intentions to marry Kokila known to his parents. His mother relents, but his father Raja Bahadur Moti Sagar refuses to budge. With the help of his mother and some planning, Ashok brings Kokila into the house as his bride and his father finally gives his consent.

== Cast ==
- Kishore Kumar as Ashok Sagar
- Chand Usmani as Kokila
- Smriti Biswas as Roopa
- Jayant as Raja Bahadur Moti Sagar
- Ulhas as Colonel Jung Bahadur
- Leela Mishra as Mrs. Jung Bahadur
- S. N. Banerjee as Saligram

== Soundtrack ==
Baap Re Baap (Original Motion Picture Soundtrack)

Soundtrack album by O. P. Nayyar & C. Ramchandra (uncredited)
- Released: 1955
- Recorded: 1955
- Studio: Gramophone Co of India Ltd
- Genre: Feature film soundtrack
- Language: Hindi
- Label: Saregama

The music directors were C. Ramchandra (uncredited) and O. P. Nayyar, with lyrics written by Jan Nisar Akhtar. While C. Ramchandra composed 3 songs in this film, O. P. Nayyar composed the remaining 8. C. Ramchandra's songs were not issued in the original release of 78 RPM records and the composer was not listed in the film's opening credits. The circumstances that led to C. Ramchandra's truncated involvement in the film are not known. C. Ramchandra was also giving the music for another of Kardar's film Yasmin (1955) released the same year.

=== Tracklist ===
Song	Singer(s)	Music Director
"Aisi Shaadi Se Hum Toh Kunwaare Bhale..."	Kishore Kumar	C. Ramchandra
"Deewana Dil Gaaye Ab Mujhse Raha Naa Jaaye..."	Asha Bhosle	C. Ramchandra
"Main Bhi Jawan, Dil Bhi Jawan..."	Asha Bhosle	C. Ramchandra
"Tu Na Bata Humein Sab Hai Pata..."	Asha Bhosle	O. P. Nayyar
"Tum Na Aaye Ghata Gham Ki Chhaane Lagi..."	Asha Bhosle	O. P. Nayyar
"Kahe Dil Yeh Deewana Mera..."	Asha Bhosle	O. P. Nayyar
"Ab Yeh Bata, Jaayen Kahan..."	Asha Bhosle	O. P. Nayyar
"Raat Rangeeli, Chamke Taare..."	Asha Bhosle	O. P. Nayyar
"Jaane Bhi De, Chhod Yeh Bahana..."	Asha Bhosle	O. P. Nayyar
"Phool Se Galon Pe, Matwari Chalon Pe Main Hoon Fida..."	Kishore Kumar & Asha Bhosle	O. P. Nayyar
"Piya Piya Piya, Mera Jiya Pukare, Hum Bhi Chalenge Saiyan"	Kishore Kumar & Asha Bhosle	O. P. Nayyar
