= Zorro (1975 Hindi film) =

- Directed by: Shibu Mitra
- Music by: Kalyanji–Anandji
- Release date: 1975
- Country: India
- Language: Hindi

Zorro is a 1975 Hindi-language swashbuckler film directed by Shibu Mitra, starring Rekha, Navin Nischol as Zorro, Danny Denzongpa and Bindu.

== Plot ==
Maharaj Bahadur Singh falls in love with Parvati, gets intimate with her, resulting in her getting pregnant, but he is forced to marry a much wealthier woman. After giving birth to a son, Gunawar, Parvati disappears from Bahadur's life. Bahadur's wife also gives birth to a boy, Vikram, and compels her husband to make him the next Maharaj. Gunawar excels in swordplay, grows up, albeit a bit senile and childlike, while Vikram grows up arrogant, befriends Senapati Shamsher Singh, and both hope to take over the reins of this kingdom. When Bahadur opposes their sinister designs, Shamsher has him arrested and lodged in a dungeon. When Gunawar finds out that atrocities are carried out by Shamsher and Vikram, he dons a mask, calls himself Zorro, and comes to the rescue of Shamsher's victims. The wily Shamsher concocts a scheme with a convict, Sher Singh, to lure and kill Zorro. But Murphy's Law prevails, and Sher and Zorro become friends. But not for long as they are destined to become mortal enemies, especially after Sher finds out that Zorro is really Rajkumar Gunawar and is colluding with Shamsher to carry out atrocities on the villagers

== Cast ==
- Navin Nischol as Bade Rajkumar Gunawar Singh / Zorro
- Rekha as Rajkumari Rekha
- Danny Denzongpa as Sher Singh
- Aruna Irani as Sher Singh's Girlfriend
- Bindu as Nisha
- Om Shivpuri as Maharaj Bahadur Singh
- Urmila Bhatt as Maharani
- Mukri as Maniram
- Master Bhagwan as Villager
- Asit Sen as Daroga
- Sudhir as Chhote Rajkumar Vikram Singh
- Imtiaz Khan as Senapati Shamsher Singh
- Paidi Jairaj as Guruji

== Soundtrack ==
Music by Kalyanji-Anandji.

Track listing
| No. | Title | Singer(s) | Length |
|---|---|---|---|
| 1. | "Kya Cheez Hai Aurat Duniya Mein" | Kishore Kumar, Asha Bhosle |
| 2. | "Dilwalon Se Pyar Kar Lo, Pyar Ke Naam Ka Jaam Bhar Lo" | Asha Bhosle, Mohammed Rafi, Usha Timothy |
| 3. | "Haay Re Tauba, Mujhe Kya Hua" | Asha Bhosle |
| 4. | "Dil Tere Naam Kar Doongi" | Asha Bhosle |
| 5. | "Haay Haay Main Mar Gayi" | Asha Bhosle |
