= Prem Tapasya =

1983 film by Dasari Narayana Rao

- Theatrical release poster
- Directed by: Dasari Narayana Rao
- Written by: Rahi Masoom Reza (dialogues)
- Screenplay by: Dasari Narayana Rao
- Story by: Dasari Narayana Rao
- Based on: Premabhishekam (1981)
- Produced by: Akkineni Nageswara Rao
- Starring: Jeetendra; Reena Roy; Rekha
- Cinematography: M. Kannappa
- Edited by: B. Krishnam Raju
- Music by: Laxmikant Pyarelal
- Production company: Annapurna Studios
- Release date: 15 January 1983
- Running time: 138 minutes
- Country: India
- Language: Hindi

Prem Tapasya (transl. Love Penance) is a 1983 Hindi-language romance film, produced by Akkineni Nageswara Rao under the Annapurna Studios banner and directed by Dasari Narayana Rao. It stars Jeetendra, Reena Roy, Rekha with music composed by Laxmikant Pyarelal. The film is a remake of the Telugu blockbuster movie Premabhishekam (1981), starring Akkineni Nageswara Rao and Sridevi, Jayasudha. Both the movies were made under the same banner, by the same director.

== Cast ==
- Jeetendra as Mohan Kumar Verma
- Rekha as Bela
- Reena Roy as Devi Singh
- Vinod Mehra as Ashok
- Anita Raj as Anita
- Ashok Kumar as Dr. Chowdhary
- Prem Chopra as Dr. Nandlal Kumar Singh
- Om Shivpuri as Ram Kumar Verma
- Dinesh Hingoo as Lachhu
- Ashalata Wabgaonkar as Mrs. Pratibha Kumar Verma
- Dina Pathak as Naniji
- Agha as Pandit
- Harish Kumar

== Soundtrack ==
Lyrics: Anand Bakshi

#	Song	Singer
1	"Devi Kuch To Bol"	Kishore Kumar, Asha Bhosle
2	"Mere Chand Ko Chand Ne Dekha"	Kishore Kumar, Asha Bhosle
3	"Raqqasa Raqs Kar"	Asha Bhosle, Shabbir Kumar
4	"Shaam Hai Kuch Khoyi Khoyi"	Lata Mangeshkar, Shabbir Kumar
5	"Aadmi Deewana Hai"	Shabbir Kumar
6	"Shukriya Shukriya"	Shabbir Kumar
