= Shankar Dada =

- Theatrical poster
- Directed by: Shibu Mitra
- Written by: Ram Kelkar (screenplay), Ehsan Rizvi (dialogue)
- Produced by: S. K. Kapur
- Starring: Ashok Kumar; Shashi Kapoor; Neetu Singh; Bindu; Pran
- Music by: Sonik Omi
- Release date: 22 July 1976
- Country: India
- Language: Hindi

Shankar Dada is a 1976 Bollywood film directed by Shibu Mitra. It stars Ashok Kumar, Shashi Kapoor, Neetu Singh, Bindu, Pran in pivotal roles and music was composed by Sonik Omi.

== Cast ==
- Ashok Kumar as Police Superintendent
- Shashi Kapoor as Inspector Ram Singh / Shankar Singh "Shankar Dada" (Double Role)
- Neetu Singh as Roopa Verma
- Bindu as Bindiya
- Pran as Inspector Amar Singh
- Anjali Kadam as Mrs. Shanta Singh
- Mohan Choti as Porter
- Roopesh Kumar as Moti
- Anwar Hussain as Babu Dada "Babubhai"
- Rajan Haksar as Lakhan Singh

== Songs ==
Song	Singer
"Ameeron Watan Se"	Mohammed Rafi
"Ek Main, Ek Tu, I Love You, I Love You"	Asha Bhosle; Mohammed Rafi
"Tune Jalwe Nahin Dekhe, Jalaal Nahin Dekha"	Asha Bhosle; Manna Dey
"Hay Hay, Mar Jawan"	Asha Bhosle
"Jooti Lungi Sitaronwali"	Ranu Mukherjee
