= Mr. Murder (film) =

1969 Hindi-language film

- Directed by: N. A. Ansari
- Produced by: Bundel
- Starring: N. A. Ansari; Nakhi Jahan; Chand Usmani; Rajan Kapoor
- Production company: Bundelkhand Filmes
- Release date: 1 January 1969
- Running time: 83 minutes
- Country: India
- Language: Hindi

Mr. Murder is a 1969 Hindi suspense thriller directed by Nisar Ahmed Ansari and starring himself along with Chand Usmani.

== Soundtrack ==
Track#	Title	Singer
1	"Hum To Dil Jaan Dono Hi Kho Baithe"	Asha Bhosle
2	"Duniya Wale Roop Ke Diwane"	Usha Mangeshkar, Shamshad Begum
3	"Roop Nagar Ki Phoolwari Me"	Asha Bhosle
4	"Sakhi Ri Mujhe Duniya Se"	Asha Bhosle, Usha Mangeshkar
5	"Thandi Hawaye Behki Adaye"	Asha Bhosle
