= Seema (1971 film) =

1971 film

- Directed by: Surendra Mohan
- Produced by: Sohanlal Kanwar
- Music by: Jaikishan Dayabhai Panchal; Shankarsingh Raghuwanshi
- Release date: 1971
- Country: India
- Language: Hindi

Seema is a 1971 Hindi film directed by Surendra Mohan. Though this film was not a big commercial success, it is renowned for its lilting musical score by the duo of Shankar Jaikishan and is especially remembered for a very famous song by Tamil singer Sharda Rajan Iyengar with Mohammad Rafi; "Jab Bhi Yeh Dil Udaas Hota Hai", which was penned by Gulzar.

== Cast ==
- Rakesh Roshan
- Kabir Bedi
- Simi Garewal as Seema
- Bharathi Vishnuvardhan
- Padma Khanna
- Chand Usmani
- Abhi Bhattacharya
- Gopal Sehgal
- Kanchan Mattu
- Sulochana

== Music ==
The music of this movie was composed by Shankar Jaikishan

1. "Ladki Chale Jab Sadko Par Aaye Qayamat" - Kishore Kumar
2. "Waqt Thodaa Saa Abhi Kuchh Aur Guzar Jaane De" - Kishore Kumar, Asha Bhosle
3. "Dil Mera Kho Gaya, Kho Jane Do" - Kishore Kumar, Asha Bhosle
4. "Ek Thi Nindiya Do The Naina" - Suman Kalyanpur
5. "Ek Thi Nindiya Do The Naina (Sushma)" - Sushma Shrestha
6. "Jab Bhi Ye Dil Udaas Hotaa Hai, Jaane Kaun Aas Paas Hotaa Hai" - Mohammed Rafi, Sharda
7. "Kispe Hai Tera Dil, Naam Lena Mushkil" - Mohammed Rafi, Asha Bhosle
