= Main Aur Mera Haathi =

- Poster
- Directed by: R. Thiagaraj
- Produced by: C. Dhandayuthapani
- Starring: Mithun Chakraborty; Poonam Dhillon; Suresh Oberoi; Sharat Saxena.
- Music by: Kalyanji Anandji; Maya Govind (lyrics)
- Release date: 1981
- Running time: 130 minutes
- Country: India
- Language: Hindi

Main Aur Mera Haathi (transl. Me and my elephant) is a 1981 Hindi-language Indian film directed by R. Thiagaraj, starring Mithun Chakraborty, Poonam Dhillon, Suresh Oberoi and Sharat Saxena.

== Cast ==
- Mithun Chakraborty as Ram / Raj
- Poonam Dhillon as Meena / Julie
- Suresh Oberoi as Teja (Bandit)
- Sharat Saxena as Vicky (Bandit)
- Mahendra Sandhu as Rakesh / Raka (Bandit)
- Satyen Kappu as Kumar, Ram's Father
- Ram Sethi as Professor
- Keshto Mukherjee
- Madhu Malhotra as Miss Lily
- Seema Deo
- Pandari Bai

== Soundtrack ==
All songs are written by Maya Govind.

| # | Title | Singer(s) |
|---|---|---|
| 1 | "Main Aur Mera Haathi" | Kishore Kumar |
| 2 | "Pyar Ka Pyar Se" | Amit Kumar |
| 3 | "Tere Liye" | Kishore Kumar, Anuradha Paudwal |
| 4 | "Hay Kahan Jo" | Hemlata, Kishore Kumar |
