= Markand Bhatt =

Indian Gujarati theatre actor and director (1929–2016)

- Born: Markand Jashbhai Bhatt; 2 October 1929; Baroda, Gujarat, India
- Died: 5 February 2016 (aged 86); Vadodara, Gujarat, India
- Occupations: Theatre actor and director
- Known for: Gujarati theatre
- Spouse: Urmila Bhatt
- Children: 2

Markand Jashbhai Bhatt (2 October 1929 – 5 February 2016) was an Indian Gujarati theatre actor and director. Born and studied in Vadodara, he taught theatre for more than thirty years at M. S. University. He acted in and directed several Gujarati plays.

== Life ==
Markand Bhatt was born on 2 October 1929 in Vadodara. He started acting at the age of ten in local stage troops. He received master's degree in Drama in 1958 from Maharaja Sayajirao University of Baroda.

He served as the Head of the Department of Drama at Saurashtra Sangeet Natak Akademi, Rajkot for two years. He served as the Head of Department of Theatre Art from 1969 to 1989 and the dean of the Faculty of Performing Arts from 1984 to 1989 at Maharaja Sayajirao University of Baroda. He was chairman of the Gujarat Sangeet Natak Akademi from 1992 to 1995.

He had acted in more than 1,500 shows of Gujarati plays. He is considered as a pioneer of modern Gujarati theatre who revived the theatre in 1960s. The plays in which he acted include Chandravadan Mehta's Atrulupta Saraswati and Param Maheshwar; Rabindranath Tagore's Nandini, Muktadhara and Arup Ratan; Bhasa's Karnabhar, Shankar Shesh's Raktabeej, Raghuveer Chaudhari's Sikandar Saani and Girish Karnad's Agni Ane Vaarsad. Some other plays are Vasundhara na Vahala Davala, Gagane Megh Chhavayo, Venice no Vepari, Janani Janmabhoomi, Nava Klevar Dharo Hansala, Sumanlal T Dave. He acted in two Gujarati films including Reti na Ratan.

He directed several plays including some acclaimed ones; Dhara Gurjari, Paritran, Shetal Ne Kanthe, Finger Print and Hoholika. He played as an actor and directed plays till 2000. He was associated with an organization, Triveni, to work in field of theatre.

He died on 5 February 2016 at Vadodara at the age of 87.

== Recognition ==
He received Gujarat Sangeet Natak Akademi award in 1973. He also received Sangeet Natak Akademi Award in 2008. He was felicitated by London-based Bharatiya Vidya Bhavans in 1984.

== Personal life ==
He was married to Urmila Bhatt, a Hindi film and Gujarati theatre actress whom he met during studies. Theirs was a love marriage. Owing to their respective careers, Markand Bhatt used to stay at Baroda while Urmila stayed alone in a flat in Juhu where she was murdered on 22 February 1997 by an unknown assassin for an unknown cause (possibly robbery). They have a son and a daughter.
