= Goonj (1974 film) =

- Directed by: S. U. Sayeed
- Produced by: Sangam Films Company
- Starring: Rakesh Roshan; Reena Roy; Mahendra Sandhu
- Music by: R. D. Burman
- Release date: 1974
- Country: India
- Language: Hindi

Goonj (transl. an "echo") is a 1974 Bollywood suspense thriller film directed by S.U. Syed.

== Cast ==
- Rakesh Roshan as Rakesh
- Reena Roy as Meena
- Mahendra Sandhu as Rajesh
- Kader Khan as Khan
- Bindu
- Viju Khote
- Kedarnath Saigal
- Arpana Choudhary

== Summary ==
A very rare Hindi suspense movie, Goonj was released in 1974 and stars Rakesh Roshan and Reena Roy. As the movie begins, two hands approach a lady from behind and push her into a valley and she dies. But later, she appears again in the form of a ghost in white attire. Her only mission now is to find her killer.

== Story ==
Goonj starts with the killing of a woman by a man who thrusts her from a cliff. The victim turns out to be Meena, who was a painter and married to Rakesh, a rich businessman and a painter like her. Rakesh's friend Rajesh arrives at the place (a hilly estate away from the city in which Rakesh has his old-fashioned mansion and he lives there only). Rajesh is received at the railway station by a stranger, who has already arranged a horse for him to reach Rakesh's residence. When Rajesh reaches there, it is shown that Meena is already there in a spirit like appearance. Thereafter, the story starts in the real sense in flashback with the narrator speaking about the bygone period of the lives of the characters of this story.

Meena is the granddaughter of a deceased rich man who had made a will that Meena would have to marry within a month of attaining the age of 20 years, or else the wealth would go charitable institutions. Meena has been fostered by her uncle Ratanlal, after the death of her parents, who is in financial troubles and awaiting her marriage so that she is able to support him after getting the wealth. In this regard, he gets caveats and consultation from a crooked lawyer, who is thinking of usurping Meena's wealth by arranging her marriage with his licentious nephew Roopesh. Rakesh too has a greedy aunt. However, Meena is actually in love with Rajesh and they have decided to marry.

Before Meena and Rajesh could marry, Rajesh is called by his ailing father who wants to see him married. In his absence, Meena is wrongly informed that he has married some other girl in the city. A disheartened Meena agrees to marrying Rakesh, whose greedy aunt had initiated this matrimonial alliance proposal (after knowing about the will of Meena's grandfather). When Rajesh, whose father has died, learns of Meena's marriage, he starts burning in rage, considering Meena as unfaithful to him. Rakesh's aunt is also unhappy with Rakesh and Meena as she is not allowed to interfere with Meena's wealth after this marriage.

On the other hand, Meena and Rakesh are invited by Roopesh and his girlfriend Sonia to a party thrown on the occasion of Sonia's birthday. Rakesh, being out of station, they reach the venue separately and not together (reaching at different points of time). Thereafter, Meena is shown as being murdered by someone who thrusts her from the cliff situated in the estate. Her uncle disappears thereafter. Investigating police officer Khan suspects many people in this regard. A lunatic also crosses paths with the people involved. Even the servant in Rakesh's home appears to be mysterious by his gestures.

Now as shown in the beginning of this movie, Rajesh comes back and reaches Rakesh's house. However, it's Meena who opens the gate of the mansion for him, ushers him to the guest room of the mansion and entertains him. When Rajesh tells Rakesh about it and learns from him that Meena is dead, both are taken aback and scared like anything. Is Meena alive or is it her spirit who wants to seek revenge from her killer? The same question appears before Roopesh also whom Meena meets. The biggest surprise for the males come when a stranger approaches Rakesh's home and starts asking for his wife. When Rakesh expresses ignorance of his wife, he starts accusing him to be in collusion with his in-laws.

== Soundtrack ==
| Song | Singer |
|---|---|
| "Tumko Kitna Pyar Hai, Kitna Bekarar Hai Jiya" | Kishore Kumar, Lata Mangeshkar |
| "Aa Meri Jaan, Main Khadi Hoon Yahan" | Lata Mangeshkar |
| "Re Mita De Tu Agar Mujhko Mitana Hai Re" | Asha Bhosle |
| "Kar Loongi Duja Koi, Reh Jayega Tu" | Mohammed Rafi, Asha Bhosle |
