= Aaj Ki Dhara =

1979 Indian Hindi film

Aaj Ki Radha
- Directed by: Mukul Dutt
- Produced by: Dewan Kapoor
- Starring: Mahendra Sandhu, Rehana Sultan, Waheeda Rehman, Danny Denzongpa
- Cinematography: K. K. Mahajan
- Music by: Sapan Jagmohan, Lyrics Naqsh Lyallpuri
- Release date: 17 August 1979
- Country: India
- Language: Hindi

Aaj Ki Radha is a 1979 Bollywood film directed by Mukul Dutt. The film features Mahendra Sandhu, Rehana Sultan, Waheeda Rehman, Danny Denzongpa and Ranjeet in the lead roles.

== Cast ==
- Mahendra Sandhu
- Rehana Sultan
- Waheeda Rehman
- Danny Denzongpa
- Ranjeet

== Soundtrack ==
No.	Title	Singer(s)	Length
1.	"Khilta Hai Jo Raat Ko Milta Hai"	Asha Bhosle
2.	"Main Zindagi Ki Talash Me"	Asha Bhosle
3.	"Yeh Hum Jaante Hai"	Asha Bhosle
4.	"Yeh Mehfil Yun Hi Sajegi"	Kishore Kumar
