= Mahendra Sandhu =

Indian actor

- Born: 18 April 1947 (age 79); Patiala, Punjab, British India
- Education: Mohindra College
- Occupations: Actor, director
- Years active: 1973–1992, 2004
- Children: 2

Mahendra Sandhu (born 18 April 1947) is an Indian actor, who worked in Hindi film and Punjabi films, most known for Agent Vinod (1977), produced by Rajshri Pictures.

== Early life and education ==
Sandhu was born into a Jat (Sikh) family in the city of Patiala, Punjab. He graduated from Mohindra College, Patiala. He was very active in doing plays and was associated with Harpal Tiwana & Balwant Gargi. In 1970, he joined the Film and Television Institute of India Pune, and did two years acting course.

== Career ==
Mahendra Sandhu started his career in 1973 with Khoon Khoon, a movie inspired by Dirty Harry. He has acted in 30 films, most famously in Agent Vinod (1977), produced by Rajshri Pictures. He had impressed Tarachand Barjatya with his performance in Khoon Ki Keemat and was offered two movies. He refused those, but agreed to work in Agent Vinod.

== Directorial career ==
Mahendra Sandhu directed the movie Kisme Kitna Hai Dum in 1992.

== Later career ==
Mahendra Sandhu made an appearance in the 2004 film Mitter Pyare Nu Haal Mureedan Da Kehna, but was credited as "Mohinder Sandhu". He later purchased land in Boisar, about 90 minutes from Mumbai airport and is currently building weekend homes.

He was approached for a cameo in Agent Vinod in 2011 but declined. However, there is a dialogue in the film that is a tribute to him. When Saif Ali Khan's character is being interrogated at a base in Pakistan/Afghanistan, he reveals the identity of Ravikishan's character as an Indian spy named Major Mahendra Sandhu.

After his film career, Sandhu started a real estate business, and divided time between Mumbai and Punjab.

== Filmography ==
=== Actor ===
Title	Year	Role	Notes
Joshila	1973		
Sweekar	1973	Satish Saxena	
Khoon Khoon	1973	Anand	
Khoon Ki Keemat	1974		
Ek Ladki Badnaam Si	1974		
Madhosh	1974	Rajkumar	
Goonj	1974	Rajesh Verma	
Dharamjeet	1975		
Yaari Zindabad	1976	Gama	
Agent Vinod	1977	Agent Vinod	
Rangaa Aur Raja	1977		
Chaalu Mera Naam	1977	Birju / Amar	
Bahadur Jiska Naam	1978		
Khoon Ka Badla Khoon	1978	Ajay Kumar	
Assignment Bombay	1978	CBI Agent Vinod	
Habari	1979	Ajeet	
Guru Ho Ja Shuru	1979	Mohan/ CBI Inspector Suraj	
Sukhi Pariwar	1979	Sheetal Singh	
Jaandaar	1979	Birju	
Chambal Ki Rani	1979		
Aaj Ki Dhara	1979		
Paanch Qaidi	1981	Kaaka	
Main Aur Mera Haathi	1981	Raka	
Khoon Ki Takkar	1981	Sheru	
Jwala Daku	1981	Jwala	
Ek Aur Sangram	1982		
Meharbaani	1982	Vijay	
Raakh Aur Chingari	1982	Sher Khan/Salim	
Yahan Se Shehar Dekho	1983		
Mujhe Vachan Do	1983	Dharamraj 'Raja Bhaiya'	
Inteqam Ki Aag	1986	Shanker/Ram	
Kaun Kitney Pani Mein Hain	1987		
Kisme Kitna Hai Dum	1992	Vikram	
Mitter Pyare Nu Haal Mureedan Da Kehna	2004		(final film role)

=== Producer ===
Title	Year
Kisme Kitna Hai Dum	1992 producer and director Mahendra Sandhu

Kaun kitne paani mein ۔1987producer Mahendra Sandhu director Shibu Mitra

())mujhe wachan do 1983 producer Mahendra Sandhu director Shibu Mitra

== See also ==
- List of Indian film actors
