= Aadmi Khilona Hai =

- Theatrical release poster
- Directed by: J. Om Prakash
- Written by: Dr. Achla Nagar; Sameer (lyrics)
- Produced by: Padma Rani
- Starring: Jeetendra; Govinda; Meenakshi Sheshadri; Reena Roy
- Cinematography: V.Durga Prasad
- Edited by: Nand Kumar
- Music by: Nadeem-Shravan
- Production company: FILMYUG Pvt Ltd
- Release date: 3 September 1993
- Running time: 158 mins
- Country: India
- Language: Hindi

Aadmi Khilona Hai (transl. Man is a toy) is a 1993 Indian Hindi-language drama film, produced by Padma Rani under the FILMYUG Pvt. Ltd. banner and directed by J. Om Prakash. It stars Jeetendra, Govinda, Reena Roy, Meenakshi Sheshadri in the pivotal roles and music composed by Nadeem-Shravan.

== Plot ==
The film opens with a family united by love and affection. The family patriarch, Vijay Verma, lives with his ideal wife, Ganga, his devoted younger brother, Sharad, and his daughter, Guddy. Sharad falls in love with a fellow student named Poonam, gets married and finds a good job. Sadly, he becomes separated from his family. Some time later, Ganga gives birth to a second child, Suraj. Eventually, Vijay learns that Poonam cannot conceive, and the benevolent Ganga offers to put her child up for adoption. Vijay is proud of Ganga. Time passes, Sharad earns well, and Vijay wins a large sum of money in the lottery. However, Ganga then shows a selfish side and decides to retrieve her son. Despite Poonam's urging. However, Sharad returns the child and leaves. Upon hearing this, Vijay screams, disowns Ganga, and leaves with his children. Unable to bear the guilt, Ganga hurts herself. Meanwhile, Vijay apologises to Sharad by returning to Suraj. Sharad and Poonam rush to Ganga's side when they find her unconscious. She then pleads for forgiveness, which she receives. The film ends happily with the family reunited.

== Cast ==
- Jeetendra as Vijay Verma
- Reena Roy as Ganga Verma
- Govinda as Sharad Verma
- Meenakshi Sheshadri as Poonam Verma
- Laxmikant Berde as Champaklal
- Sulabha Deshpande as Bua
- Sushmita Mukherjee as Roopmati
- Tej Sapru as Raghunath
- Anjan Srivastav as Poonam's Dadu
- Dalip Tahil as Rangraj

== Soundtracks ==
#	Title	Singer(s)
1.	"Bahut Jatate Ho Pyar"	Mohammad Aziz, Alka Yagnik
2.	"Bulbul Ne Bhi"	Mohammad Aziz, Alka Yagnik
3.	"Mahendi Laga Ne Ki Raat"	Kumar Sanu, Sadhana Sargam
4.	"Mat Kar Itna Garoor"	Pankaj Udhas, Alka Yagnik
5.	"Aadmi Khilona Hai"	Alka Yagnik
6.	"Tu Jo Milegi Na Humko"	Sudesh Bhosle, Alka Yagnik
7.	"Aadmi Khilona Hai" (One)	Pankaj Udhas
8.	"Aadmi Khilona Hai" (Two)	Pankaj Udhas
