= Khanjar (film) =

- Directed by: Atmaram
- Written by: Ram Govind
- Produced by: Atmaram; Gurudutt Films
- Starring: Navin Nischol; Reena Roy; Suresh Oberoi; Amjad Khan; Mehmood
- Cinematography: K. R. Murthy; Yusuf
- Edited by: E. G. Shinde
- Music by: Nitin Mangesh; Maya Govind (lyrics)
- Release date: 18 January 1980 (India)
- Country: India
- Language: Hindi

Khanjar (Hindi: ख़ंजर; translation: dagger) is a 1980 Hindi language film, produced and directed by Atmaram. This action thriller casts Navin Nischol in the lead with the supporting cast of Reena Roy, Suresh Oberoi, Amjad Khan, Jankidas, Jayshree T., Jeevan, K. N. Singh, Mehmood, Murad, Reeta Bhaduri, Sajjan and Shekhar Kapur. Nitin Mangesh scored the music for this film, with lyrics written by Maya Govind.

The story, in brief, is about a dagger in a criminal investigation, and the mysterious deaths around the life of its custodian.

== Plot ==
Prakash (Navin Nischol), a librarian, lives with his daughter. One day, his friend and private detective Captain Usman (Suresh Oberoi) visits him and gives him a diary along with a dagger (khanjar) to safeguard them. He also informs Prakash about their importance for a case under his investigation and that he has been threatened by some gangsters about them. Soon after this, Prakash learns that Usman is murdered. He also receives a call from a stranger inquiring about Usman's diary and the dagger. Meanwhile, a smart girl named Preeti (Reena Roy) starts to flirt and get closer to him to know about the diary and the dagger. Prakash notices her acts, and illustrates to the police the story of Usman's diary, the dagger, his murder and Preeti's attempts for them. They instruct him to follow her to learn about the gangsters she works with. Upon his insistence, Preeti informs him about her activities under the instructions of Prince (Amjad Khan). Soon Prince learns about her behaviour and kills her. After a few days, his brother-in-law Ramesh (Shekhar Kapur), married to his younger sister Jyoti (Rita Bhaduri), is also found murdered. Disturbed by these mysterious murders leading to the dagger, Prakash and his magician friends Jagat (Mehmood) and Rasvanti (Jashree T.) visit an old town, Udaigarh, famous for Swamiji (Amjad Khan). One mystery leads to a deeper mystery and a series of thrilling events unravel the mystery of the khanjar.

== Cast ==
- Navin Nischol as Prakash
- Reena Roy as Nisha / Madhu / Preeti (Double Role)
- Jayshree T. as Rasvanti
- Mehmood as Jagat
- Amjad Khan as Zorawar Singh 'Swamiji' / Shamsher Singh 'Prince' (Double Role)
- Jeevan as Dr. Prem
- Suresh Oberoi as Captain Usman
- Reeta Bhaduri as Jyothi
- Shekhar Kapur as Ramesh
- Gauri Verma
- Jankidas
- K. N. Singh
- Manik Irani
- Mridula
- Murad
- Raja Duggal
- Sajjan
- Sunder Taneja

== Soundtrack ==
All lyrics are written by Maya Govind; all music is composed by Nitin Mangesh.

No.	Title	Singer(s)	Length
1.	"Dekho Mera Ye Jantar Mantar"	Mahmood, Anjali	3:00
2.	"Honolulu Se Aai Hoon Main"	Usha Timothy	5:05
3.	"Lo Hum Aagaye Hain Phir Tere Dar"	Aziz Nazan	4:50
4.	"Teri Nigah Khanjar"	Aziz Nazan	3:55
5.	"Tum Meri Zindagi Ho" (Solo)	Arati Mukherjee	6:00
6.	"Tum Meri Zindagi Ho" (Duet)	Jaspal Singh, Aarti Mukharjee	5:00
7.	"Zinda Hoon Magar Zinda Hoon Nahin"	Arati Mukherjee	5:05
