= Arpan =

- Theatrical release poster
- Directed by: J. Om Prakash
- Written by: Ramesh Pant (dialogues)
- Screenplay by: Ramesh Pant
- Story by: J. Om Prakash
- Produced by: J. Om Prakash
- Starring: Jeetendra; Raj Babbar; Reena Roy; Parveen Babi
- Cinematography: V. Babasaheb
- Edited by: Nand Kumar
- Music by: Laxmikant–Pyarelal
- Production company: Filmyug Pvt Ltd
- Release date: 1 April 1983
- Running time: 140 minutes
- Country: India
- Language: Hindi

Arpan (transl. Dedication) is a 1983 Hindi-language romantic drama film, produced and directed by J. Om Prakash under the Filmyug Pvt. Ltd. banner. It stars Jeetendra, Raj Babbar, Reena Roy and Parveen Babi and Laxmikant–Pyarelal composed the music.

== Plot ==
The film begins with love birds Anil & Shobha who are about to get married. Shobha works in a private firm owned by a multimillionaire JK. Once, he runs wild with Shobha and she smacks him. A humiliated JK challenges to possess her by all means.

Anil's sister Vinnie loves Rakesh an employee of JK and everyone approves of the match. Anil goes abroad. Vinnie becomes pregnant. Rakesh must marry her. JK exploits the situation and blackmails Shobha to marry him. When Rakesh & Vinnie realize her sacrifice Shobha requests them to maintain silence. Anil returns, misconstrues Shobha and is devastated. He meets a singer Sona and they get married.

JK is diagnosed with cancer which makes him repent. Shobha becomes pregnant. JK passes away. Anil realizes the truth. Filled with regret he meets Shobha and apologizes.

Shobha gives birth to a baby boy. Seeing the care Anil takes of her Sona becomes suspicious about their relationship. Sona meets with an accident and is declared unable to conceive. Shobha reaches out to Anil and offers her baby to Sona. Finally, the movie ends with Shobha dying on Anil's lap.

== Cast ==
- Jeetendra as Anil Verma
- Raj Babbar as JK
- Reena Roy as Shobha
- Parveen Babi as Sona
- Shashi Puri as Rakesh
- Priti Sapru as Vinnie Verma
- Tom Alter as Anil's friend
- Dina Pathak as Anil's mother
- Sujit Kumar as Ashok
- Sudhir Dalvi as Sona's Baba
- Sulochana Latkar as Shoba's mother

== Soundtrack ==
The music of the film was composed by Laxmikant Pyarelal, while lyrics were written by Anand Bakshi.

#	Title	Singer(s)
1	"Pardes Jake Pardesia"	Lata Mangeshkar
2	"Teri Meri Shaadi Hogi"	Lata Mangeshkar, Kishore Kumar
3	"Tauba Kaise Hai Nadan Ghunghroo"	Lata Mangeshkar
4	"Mohabbat Ab Tijarat Ban Gai Hai"	Anwar Hussain
5	"Likhne Wale Ne Likh Dale"	Lata Mangeshkar, Suresh Wadkar
