= Deedar =

Deedar may refer to:

- Deedar (1951 film), a 1951 Indian Hindi-language romantic musical film by Nitin Bose, starring Dilip Kumar and Nargis
- Deedar (1970 film), a 1970 Indian Hindi-language film
- Deedar (1992 film), a 1992 Indian Hindi-language romantic action film by Pramod Chakravorty, starring Akshay Kumar and Karishma Kapoor
- Deedar (actress) (born 1980), Pakistani stand-up comedian, dancer and actress

== See also ==
- Di-Dar, an album by Faye Wong
