= Jayshree T. =

Indian actress

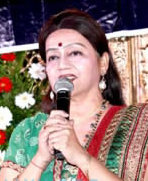
- Jayshree T. in 2013
- Born: Jayshree Talpade; 12 June 1953 (age 73); Bombay, India
- Occupation: Actress
- Years active: 1966–2018
- Spouse: Jayprakash Karnataki (m. 1989)
- Relatives: Shreyas Talpade (nephew)

Jayshree Talpade is an Indian actress and dancer who predominantly works in Hindi film productions and a few television productions.

== Career ==
Talpade began her career with Goonj Uthi Shehnai. She gained popularity when she started performing item dances in films, being an exponent of Kathak. However she had already gained a foothold in the industry, as a child artiste in Sangeet Samrat Tansen, Zameen Ke Taare (1960) and Pyar Ki Pyaas (1961). She was in the studios with Ravi Shankar when the Beatles were visiting.

She adopted the name of "Jayshree T" based on her original surname of Talpade though her last name was in time Karnataki as she later married. She took the name to differentiate herself from other actresses like Rajshree.

According to her, it was Gopi Kishan who spotted her dancing in a film. Initially, she wanted to become a doctor, but film director Amit Bose cast her in a dance sequence for Abhilasha in 1968, after she was recommended by choreographer Harmendar. After that, she danced in more than 500 movies in the 1970s and 1980s. She has done vampish-comedy and sympathetic roles. Jayshree has acted in various Indian languages including Bengali, Tamil, Telugu, Malayalam, Kannada, Marwadi, Rajastani, English, Sindhi, Assamese, Bhojpuri, Oriya, Haryani, Garyali, Nepali, Punjabi, Marathi and Gujarati.

She has performed on stage with Mohammad Rafi, Manna Dey, Mukesh and Asha Bhosle. She has received two Maharashtra State Government awards for Marathi film as a leading lady, three Gujarat state government awards, Hyderabad Award, six lions club awards from Delhi and Mumbai. She received the Life Time Achievement Award for Bhojpuri films and Gujarati films.

Citing an incident which took place in a remote place of Gwalior, while shooting for a song, in an interview in 2012, Jayshree is quoted to have said: "We were shooting at a remote spot in Gwalior, for Kasam Bhavani Ki (1981), in which Yogeeta Bali played the female lead. At the shooting site, I noticed a lot of police personnel. Some of the officers came up to me and said it was better I didn't shoot and returned to Bombay. "But why?" I exclaimed. "Madame", they replied, "we have received information that the dacoits in this region, are planning to kidnap you. They appear to be quite crazy about you". I was shocked! Such pretty girls like Yogeeta and Nazneen around, and I was their target!" The song was then shot at Film City. "Meri Lal Gulabi Choli" (Kasam Bhawani Ki), was the song.

== Personal life ==
Jayshree got married in 1989 to film director Jayprakash Karnataki, son of actor and director Master Vinayak and brother of actress Nanda. She gave birth to a son, Swastik J. Karnataki in 1991. Her sister Meena T. is also an actress and dancer. Her nephew is the actor Shreyas Talpade.

== Filmography ==
Year	Film	Character/Role	Language
2010	Annarakkannanum Thannalayathu		Malayalam
2004	Meri Biwi Ka Jawaab Nahin	Gangu	Hindi
2003	Chalte Chalte	Mrs Manubhai	Hindi
1999	Hum Saath-Saath Hain	Mamta's Friend	Hindi
1992	Swaroopam		Malayalam
1988	Dagabaz Balma		Bhojpuri
1986	Garakh Nath Baba Tohe Khichari Charaibo		Bhojpuri
1986	Chameli Ki Shaadi	Gulabo (Naththilal's wife)	Hindi
1985	Piya Ke Gaon		Bhojpuri
1985	Ghar Dwaar	Sheela (Bahadur's Wife)	Hindi
1984	Shatru		Bengali
1983	Hamar Bhauji		Bhojpuri
1982	Suraag	Guest Appearance	Hindi
1982	Aaplech Daat Aaplech Oth	Kaashibai	Marathi
1982	Angachamayam		Malayalam
1981	Abhinayam	Alka Mehta	Malayalam
1981	Sannata	Rubaiya	Hindi
1981	Kasam Bhawani Ki		Hindi
1980	Pilla Zamindar		Telugu
1980	Morcha		Hindi
1980	Sau Din Saas Ke	Kesarbai	Hindi
1980	Khanjar	Rasvanti	Hindi
1980	Hyoch Navra Pahije	Gopi	Marathi
1979	Meena Kumari Ki Amar Kahani		Hindi
1979	Jaani Dushman	Barbers daughter, jagdeep's girl friend	Hindi
1979	Dada	Dancer	Hindi
1979	Mai Ka Lal		Bhojpuri
1978	Naukri	Mary	Hindi
1978	Besharam	Rosie	Hindi
1977	Jay Vejay	Bela	Hindi
1977	Aafat	Rajni	Hindi
1975	Anokha	Suzy	Hindi
1974	Bidaai	Bhaskar's girlfriend	Hindi
1974	Aap Ki Kasam	Sunita's friend	Hindi
1973	Jugnu		
1973	Kahani Kismat Ki		
1973	Ranakdevi		Gujarati
1972	Nirthasala	Malini	Malayalam
1971	Annadha Shilpangal		Malayalam
1971	Sharmeelee	Song "Reshmi Ujala Hai" picturised on her	Hindi
1971	Saat Sawal		Hindi
1971	Dost Aur Dushman		Hindi
1971	Tere Mere Sapne		Hindi
1970	Deedar	Kavita	Hindi
1971	Woh Din Yaad Karo		Hindi
1970	Pardesi		Hindi
1970	Sawan Bhadon	Song "Ankhen Meri Maikhana" picturised on her	Hindi
1969	Talash	Song "Aaj Ko Junli Raat Maa" as dancer in black	Hindi
1968	Dharmakanya	Song "Sakhi Ga Murali Mohan Mohi Mana" picturised on her	Marathi
1966	Phool Aur Patthar	at Jewellery shop (uncredited)	Hindi

=== Television ===
Year	Show	Role
2011–2012	Iss Pyaar Ko Kya Naam Doon?	Devyani Raizada
2013	Do Dil Ek Jaan	Shaanta daadi
2015	Sasural Simar Ka	Badi Daayan
2017	Savitri Devi College & Hospital	Sudha's mother-in-law
2018	Yeh Un Dinon Ki Baat Hai	Phulla Bua
