= Baghavat =

- Poster
- Directed by: Ramanand Sagar
- Written by: Rajinder Krishan (dialogues)
- Screenplay by: K. K. Shukla
- Story by: Ramanand Sagar
- Produced by: Ramanand Sagar
- Starring: Dharmendra; Hema Malini; Reena Roy
- Cinematography: K Vaikunth
- Edited by: Lachhman Dass
- Music by: Laxmikant–Pyarelal
- Production company: Sagar Films
- Release date: 27 August 1982
- Country: India
- Language: Hindi

Baghavat is a 1982 Hindi language film starring Dharmendra, Hema Malini, Reena Roy, Amjad Khan and music composed by Laxmikant-Pyarelal. The film is directed by Ramanand Sagar. It became a "hit" at the box office.

== Cast ==
- Dharmendra as Rajkumar Amar Singh
- Hema Malini as Rajkumari Padmavati Singh
- Reena Roy as Chhanno
- Amjad Khan as Durjan Singh / Vikram Singh (Double Role)
- Sujit Kumar as Sarju
- Padma Chavan as Maharani
- Urmila Bhatt as Amar's Foster Mother
- B. M. Vyas as Mahamantri
- D. K. Sapru as Maharaj

== Soundtrack ==
Music by Laxmikant–Pyarelal. Lyrics by Anand Bakshi

Song	Singer
"Naagan Sa Roop Hai Tera"	Mohammed Rafi
"Mere Mehboob Tujhe Salaam, Salaam Salaam Salaam"	Mohammed Rafi, Asha Bhosle
"Duniya Se, Duniyawalon Se Hum Aaj Baghavat Karte Hai"	Mahendra Kapoor, Asha Bhosle
"Banjare Hum Banjare, Saari Duniya Se Nyare"	Shabbir Kumar, Asha Bhosle
"Ae Mere Deewane Dil"	Asha Bhosle
"Yeh Apna Yaarana"	Rajeshwari
