= Chambal Ki Raani =

- Directed by: Radhakant
- Starring: Mahendra Sandhu; Dara Singh
- Production company: Raj International
- Release date: 1979
- Country: India
- Language: Hindi

Chambal Ki Raani is a 1979 Bollywood action film directed by Radhakant. The film stars Mahendra Sandhu, Amjad Khan and Dara Singh.

== Cast ==
- Mahendra Sandhu
- Dara Singh
- Chand Usmani
- Amjad Khan
- Bindu
- Kamal Kapoor
- Urmila Bhatt
- Narendra Nath
- Jagdeep
- Rajan Haksar

== Soundtrack ==
Song	Singer
"Aisi Najariya Maare Sanwariya"	Lata Mangeshkar
"Ho Maare Bichhua Jaisa Dank"	Lata Mangeshkar
"Yeh Bekasi Ke Andhere Zara To Dhalne De"	Lata Mangeshkar
"Meri Barbaadi Par Mera Dil Hi Badnaam Hai"	Lata Mangeshkar, Mohammed Rafi
