= Zaroorat =

- Directed by: B.R. Ishara
- Starring: Vijay Arora; Reena Roy; Danny Denzongpa
- Release date: 1972
- Running time: 140 minutes
- Country: India
- Language: Hindi

Zaroorat (transl. Necessity) is an Indian 1972 Bollywood drama film directed by B.R. Ishara.

== Plot ==
On a night when Vijay (Vijay Arora), who is a taxi driver, listens to the voice of help from a girl, he helps her and saves her from two people who are trying to harm her. That girl is Anju (Reena Roy). Vijay is a college student and drives a taxi at night to support his family financially. They come to know that they are in the same college. They begin liking each other and decide to get married.

Both the families are middle class. So, to support their families, after college they start to look for a job. Anju gets a job, but her boss has bad intentions. One night he calls her home and tries to rape her, but she escapes and leaves her job. In the meantime, the families oppose their marriage since the horoscopes don't match. In spite of this, they get married.

Now after marriage, both Anju and Vijay start looking for a job, but they don't find one. One day, Vijay meets with an accident and both of his legs are lost. He undergoes depression. He asks Anju to put him into a handicap home, but Anju declines and says she will take care of him throughout his life. When there is no money for Vijay's medicines, Anju goes to her boss who pays her money in return for her body.

When Anju arrives home with medicines, she finds that Vijay had committed suicide and in a letter, he has asked her to start a new life.

Danny who has been a very good friend of Anju and Vijay comes with 3 lakh rupees won from lottery, just to find that Vijay is no more. Anju's brother also steals money from postman and comes to home at the same time as Danny just to find out that Anju is in great shock because Vijay is no more.

== Cast ==
- Vijay Arora as Vijay
- Reena Roy as Anju
- Danny Denzongpa as Danny
- Asit Sen as Badal
- Johnny Whisky
- Manmohan Krishna
