= Deedar (actress) =

Pakistani stand-up comedian and actress

Deedar (Urdu: ديدار) (born Sonia Idrees on May 15, 1979 in Lahore) is a Pakistani stand-up comedian, actress and former dancer. She is famous for her work in Punjabi dramas.

== Personal life and family ==
She began her career in the stage dramas in Bahawalpur. She is the younger sister of dancer Nargis, and has a brother as well. Both sisters have worked together in various dramas. Her sister Samina died on December 31, 2017.

== Career ==
Deedar and her sister started a salon line called Mishi in Lahore, Islamabad, and Karachi, Pakistan. The sisters even launched the salon in Toronto, Canada in 2009. Deedar continues stage dramas and is known for her dancing skills in Pakistani songs and movies.

She has also showed her performance at many events in Lahore.
