= Reena Roy =

Indian actress

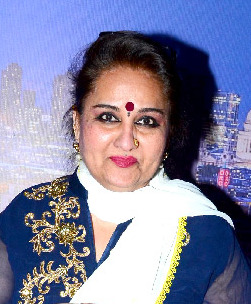
- Roy in 2018
- Born: Saira Ali; Bombay, Bombay State, India
- Occupation: Actress
- Years active: 1972–1985, 1999–2022
- Spouse: Mohsin Khan (m. 1983; div. 1992)

Reena Roy (born Saira Ali) is an Indian actress. She made her film debut as a teenager with B R Ishara's Zaroorat (1972), but gained wider public recognition with Jaise Ko Taisa (1973) and the romance-action film Zakhmee (1975). In 1976, Roy entered the top league after starring in two of the biggest box-office hits, the action thriller Kalicharan and the horror-fantasy film Nagin. She consolidated her position at the top with Vishwanath (1978) and Aasha (1980).

Roy won the Filmfare Award for Best Supporting Actress for her performance in the drama Apnapan (1977), but declined it due to categorical issues. Her success nevertheless continued throughout the late 1970s and early 1980s when she featured in several notable films including the horror film Jaani Dushman (1979), the dramas Aasha (1980), Arpan (1983) and Asha Jyoti (1984), multi starrer Naseeb (1981) and the romantic comedy Sanam Teri Kasam (1982).

In 1983, Roy married cricketer Mohsin Khan and announced a sabbatical. She shifted to Pakistan with her husband and gave birth to their daughter, Jannat, better known as Sanam Khan. She returned to India in 1992 after divorcing Khan.

Roy made a comeback in Hindi cinema with the drama Aadmi Khilona Hai (1993). She acted in a few supporting roles notably Ajay (1996), Gair (1999) and Refugee (2000). Thereafter she has primarily focused on raising her daughter, and made the occasional appearance on television, the most recently being Indian Idol. Along with her sister Barkha, Roy also runs an acting school.

== Personal life and background ==
Roy was born Saira Ali, the third daughter of Sadiq Ali, a small-time actor and Sharda Rai, who acted in film Bawre Nain and later produced the film Gunehgar Kaun. She has three siblings who all disowned their father after the parents divorced. Her mother renamed all the four children after the divorce. Roy was initially renamed Roopa Rai, which was changed to "Reena Roy" by the producer of her first film, Zaroorat. Roy started acting in films in her teens. She disputed reports that her decision to enter films was to financially support her mother and siblings.

Roy has two sisters, Barkha and Anju and a brother, Raja. Following a highly-publicised love affair with Shatrughan Sinha, in 1983, Roy decided to quit the film industry and marry Pakistani cricketer Mohsin Khan. The couple later divorced; Roy found it difficult to adjust with Khan's flamboyant lifestyle. Roy had initially lost custody of their daughter Sanam.

== Career ==
=== Debut and breakthrough (1970–76) ===
Roy is regarded as one of the most beautiful actress of Indian cinema, Roy made her acting debut in 1971 when director B. R. Ishara opposite Danny Denzongpa in Nayi Duniya Naye Log, though the film's release was delayed until 1973. Ishara subsequently offered her the lead in Zaroorat, a role she hesitated to take because of its risqué subject matter. Released in 1972, the film underperformed at the box office, but Roy's sensual performance drew attention. Her early roles traded largely on her sex appeal, notably in Jaise Ko Taisa (1973), remembered for its rain-dance number "Ab Ke Sawan Mein Jee Dare" and in the supporting part she played in the hit Zakhmee (1975), both of which brought her wider offers.

Roy's breakout came with Subhash Ghai's directorial debut Kalicharan (1976). Expectations were low going in, Ghai was a failed actor, and Shatrughan Sinha, cast against type as the hero, was best known for villainous roles but the film became a surprise commercial success, launching both actors to stardom and pairing them as a popular on-screen and off-screen duo.

The following family drama Udhar Ka Sindur, opposite Jeetendra, was also well received. Her career was cemented by Rajkumar Kohli's thriller Nagin, in which she played the title role alongside an ensemble that included Sunil Dutt, Jeetendra, Rekha and Mumtaz; the film was both a commercial hit and a critical success. Analyzing the film, writer Meheli Sen commented, "Reena Roy as the Nagin is unabashed in her sexuality; [...] she embodies a kind of feral sexuality that remains remarkable in its directness." Roy earned her first Filmfare Award for Best Actress nomination at the 24th Filmfare Awards. Box Office India published that she has established herself as one of Hindi cinema's leading actresses between Kalicharan and Nagin.

=== Stardom and establishment (1977–1985) ===
In 1977, Roy won acclaim for playing Kamini, a woman who leaves her husband (Jeetendra) for a wealthier older man, in J. Om Prakash's Apnapan. Vijay Lokapally of The Hindu stated that Roy "lives the role" and rated her performance superior to those of Jeetendra and Sulakshana Pandit. However, when Roy won the Filmfare Award for Best Supporting Actress at the 25th Filmfare Awards, she refused to accept it, arguing that her role was parallel to Pandit's. She reunited with Ghai in 1978 for the action film Vishwanath, again opposite Sinha, and with Kohli in 1979 for the horror hit Jaani Dushman; both films did well commercially. Regarding her performance in the latter, Film World remarked, "Roy is easy on the eye and acts with effortless ease in a role which demands nothing." She also starred alongside Sinha, her rumoured boyfriend at the time, in Rajkumar Kohli's successful Muqabla.

The 1980s brought Roy some of her biggest roles. Sau Din Saas Ke (1980), in which she played a rebellious daughter-in-law to Lalita Pawar, was only a modest earner but was praised critically. Far more successful was the musical Aasha (1980), opposite Jeetendra, which brought her a second Best Actress nomination at the 28th Filmfare Awards. She topped its top actresses list from 1972 to 1985, She appeared in Box Office India's "Top actresses "list 10 times, from 1976 to 1985 and topped the list one time (1980), having featured on it continuously since 1976. Her personal life also shifted around this time: her relationship with Sinha ended after he married in 1980, after which she focused more fully on her career.

In 1981, she appeared in Manmohan Desai's ensemble hit Naseeb, alongside Sinha, Amitabh Bachchan, Rishi Kapoor and Hema Malini. India Today described the film as "enjoyable but terrible for your health", but Shahid Khan of Planet Bollywood commented that Roy nevertheless, "leaves a mark in her few dramatic scenes." Roy also appeared in a supporting role opposite debutant Sanjay Dutt and Tina Munim in Sunil Dutt's 1981 romantic action Rocky. By 1982 was one of the busiest actresses in the industry, appearing in thirteen releases that year alone, and worked with leading directors including Prakash Mehra, Raj Khosla and Sultan Ahmed. Her roles diversified considerably during this period: she played a reforming widow opposite Rajesh Khanna in Dhanwan (1981); a psychiatrist opposite Vinod Khanna in Jail Yatra (1981), a courtesan opposite Dharmendra in Naukar Biwi Ka (1983), and took a double role opposite Sanjeev Kumar in Ladies Tailor (1981). She also had prominent parts in multi-heroine films such as Prem Tapasya (1983) and Asha Jyoti (1984).

Roy's title roles in this period were mixed in fortune: Lakshmi (1982), in which she played a courtesan, failed commercially and disappointed her, but the same year's Sanam Teri Kasam, a musical comedy produced by her sister Barkha Roy and co-starring Kamal Haasan, was a hit. She continued to work steadily through the mid-1980s with films including Sultan Ahmed's drama Dharam Kanta (1982), J. Om Prakash 's drama Arpan (1983), T. Rama Rao's action Andha Kanoon (1983), and Rajkumar Kohli's action drama Raaj Tilak (1984), often playing self-sacrificing or virtuous women. Over her career, Roy and Jeetendra appeared together in 22 films, 17 of them as a romantic pair, including three she co-produced with him; Apnapan and Aasha. She and Sinha, meanwhile, had 9 hits from the 16 films they featured together.

In 1985 Roy went on a career break following her marriage to cricketer Mohsin Khan. Several films she had already completed were released over the next few years, including J. P. Dutta's Ghulami, B. S. Glaad's Hum Dono and Satpal's Do Waqt Ki Roti (1988).

=== Sabbatical and later work (1992—present) ===
Roy returned to acting in 1992, taking a supporting role as a sister-in-law in Aadmi Khilona Hai (1993) but was unable to recapture her earlier success. Her final film role came in J. P. Dutta's Refugee (2000). She then moved into television, appearing in the seria Eena Meena Deeka produced by her sister Barkha; after it ended, the sisters opened an acting school together in 2004. Roy has also been involved in political campaigning for the Indian National Congress.

== Filmography ==
Year	Title	Role	Notes
1972	Zaroorat	Anju	
1972	Milap	Rani 'Chalava'/Rukmani	
1972	Jangal Mein Mangal	Leela	
1973	Nai Duniya Naye Log	Sandhya	
1973	Jaise Ko Taisa	Roopa	
1974	Madhosh	Minal	
1974	Goonj	Meena	
1975	Vardaan	Lata	
1975	Umar Qaid	Reena	
1975	Rani Aur Lalpari	Lalpari	
1975	Apne Dushman	Reshma (Reshu)	
1975	Zakhmee	Nisha Ganguly	
1976	Sangram	Poonam	
1976	Gumrah	Reena	
1976	Barood	Sapna—Bakshi's Assistant	
1976	Nagin	Nagin (female serpent)	
1976	Kalicharan	Sapna Mathur	
1976	Udhar Ka Sindur	Rekha	
1977	Zamaanat	Reshma	
1977	Taxi Taxie	Neelam	
1977	Sat Sri Akal	Shree	
1977	Paapi	Aasha	
1977	Jagriti	Barkha	
1977	Daku Aur Mahatma	Kiran	
1977	Apnapan	Kamini Agarwal	
1977	Jadu Tona	Varsha	
1977	Jay Vejay	Maharani Ambika	
1978	Karmayogi	Kiran	
1978	Daku Aur Jawan	Ganga	
1978	Chor Ho To Aisa	Champa	
1978	Vishwanath	Soni	
1978	Aakhri Daku	Champa	
1978	Badalte Rishtey	Savitri Devi	
1978	Bhookh	Bina	
1979	Muqabla	Laxmi	
1979	Heera-Moti	Neelam	
1979	Gautam Govinda	Dancer	
1979	Jaani Dushman	Reshma	
1980	Khanjar	Nisha/Preeti	
1980	Yari Dushmani	Pammi	
1980	Sau Din Saas Ke	Durga	
1980	Ganga Aur Suraj	Poonam	
1980	Kashish	Docter Seema	
1980	Aasha	Asha	
1980	Be-Reham	Kiran	
1980	Jwalamukhi	Anju	
1981	Vilayati Babu	Billo	
1981	Dushman Dost		
1981	Naseeb	Julie	
1981	Ladies Tailor	Niqat	
1981	Rocky	Lajwanti/Hirabai	
1981	Dhanwan	Asha	
1981	Pyaasa Sawan	Manorama	
1981	Jail Yatra	Shanu	
1982	Main Intequam Loonga	Mala Bajpai	
1982	Lakshmi	Lakshmi	
1982	Kachche Heere	Rani	
1982	Jeeo Aur Jeene Do	Renu	
1982	Do Ustad	Roopa	
1982	Dard Ka Rishta	Asha	
1982	Baghavat	Channo	
1982	Hathkadi	Rosie	
1982	Sanam Teri Kasam	Nisha	
1982	Badle Ki Aag	Geeta	
1982	Insaan	Sona	
1982	Dharm Kanta	Bijli	
1982	Deedar-E-Yaar	Qawalli Singer	
1982	Bezubaan	Kalpana	
1983	Andhaa Kanoon	Meena Srivastav	
1983	Arpan	Shobha	
1983	Prem Tapasya	Devi	
1983	Naukar Biwi Ka	Sandhya	
1984	Yaadon Ki Zanjeer	Usha	
1984	Raaj Tilak	Madhumati	
1984	Maati Maangey Khoon	Sharda	
1984	Asha Jyoti	Jyoti	
1984	Inteha	Anita	
1984	Karishmaa	Nisha	
1985	Kali Basti	Lajjo	
1985	Ghulami	Moran	
1985	Ek Chitthi Pyar Bhari	Aarti Saxena	
1985	Hum Dono	Rani	
1986	Mangal Dada	Lakshmi	
1987	Faqeer Badshah	Dancer	
1988	Dharam Shatru	Renu	
1988	Do Waqt Ki Roti	Shalini/Shalu	
1993	Bedardi	Preeti Saxena	
1993	Aadmi Khilona Hai	Ganga Verma	
1995	Policewala Gunda	Sudha	
1995	Janam Kundli	Rita Mehra	
1995	Kalyug Ke Avtaar	Reena	
1996	Smuggler	Usha	
1996	Rajkumar	Rani Maa	
1996	Ajay	Durga	
1997	Jeena O Shaan Se	Lata	
1999	Gair	Sharda Oberoi	
2000	Refugee	Amina Mohammad	

== Awards and nominations ==
Year	Award	Category	Film	Result
1977	Filmfare Awards	Best Actress	Nagin	Nominated
1979	Filmfare Awards	Best Supporting Actress	Apnapan	Won
1981	Filmfare Awards	Best Actress	Aasha	Nominated
