= Urmila Bhatt =

Indian actress

- Born: 1 November 1933; Dehradun, United Provinces, British India
- Died: 22 February 1997 (aged 62); Mumbai, Maharashtra, India
- Occupation: Actor
- Years active: 1962–1998
- Spouse: Markand Bhatt
- Children: 2

Urmila Bhatt (1 November 1933 – 22 February 1997) was an Indian actress of Hindi cinema. She started her career in Drama Theatre. She joined Sangeet Kala Academy in Rajkot as a folk dancer and singer. It was during that time that her famous Gujarati drama Jesal Toral ran to more than a thousand performances. She acted in more than 75 Gujarati films and also in 15 to 20 Rajasthani movies. She also played character roles in Hindi films for over two and a half decades (1960s to early 1990s) and acted in various television serials. She learnt Bharatnatyam under renowned Guru Shri Kubernath Tanjorkar. She was honoured with numerous awards by the government of Gujarat.

== Hindi films ==
After her success in theatre, she started doing Hindi films. In the late 1960s she did Gauri (1968), Sunghursh (1968) and Hamraaz (1967). A few other popular films done by her are Ankhiyon Ke Jharokhon Se (1978), Geet Gaata Chal (1975), Besharam (1978), Ram Teri Ganga Maili (1985), Balika Badhu (1976), Dhund (1973) and Alibaba Marjinaa (1977). Other than these films, she had done several other films. In most of her movies she played supporting characters. She had acted in 125 Hindi films. On television, she also played the role of Sita's mother "Maharani Sunaina in Ramanand Sagar's historic blockbuster serial Ramayan and that of Sharda Sharma in Rajshri Productions' TV Serial Paying Guest (1985). Apart from these two, she made episodic appearances in Shyam Bengal's Bharat Ek Khoj in 1989 and in Zee TV's Zee Horror Show in 1996.

== Death ==
Bhatt, who used to live alone, was found murdered at her residence in Juhu on 22 February 1997. Officials suspected that robbery was the motive behind her murder.

== Filmography ==
Year	Film	Character	Notes
1962	Janam Janam Na Saathi		
1962	Jogidas Khuman		
1967	Hamraaz	Mrs. Tejpal	
1968	Gauri	Basanti	
1968	Sunghursh	Kunti G. Prasad	
1971	Preetam	Urmila Sinha	
1971	Phir Bhi		
1972	Koshish	Mrs. Gupta	
1973	Jheel Ke Us Paar	Prabha Devi	
1973	Dhund	Mrs. Singh	
1974	Call Girl	Mrs. Sonachand	
1974	36 Ghante	Vijay's Mother	
1974	Dhuen Ki Lakeer		
1975	Dharam Karam	Ganga	
1975	Pratiggya	Mrs. D. Singh	
1975	Chori Mera Kaam	Mrs. Parvati Rathod	
1975	Jaan Hazir Hai		
1975	Jogidas Khuman		
1975	Kaam Shastra		
1975	Tanariri		
1975	Toofan		
1975	Uljhan	Lakshmi	
1975	Zorro	Maharani	
1976	Udhar Ka Sindur	Janki	
1976	Hera Pheri	Sudha	
1976	Balika Badhu	Amal's mother	
1976	Do Anjaane	Shivani Dutt	
1976	Khalifa	Shanta D. Sharma	
1976	Maa		
1976	Santu Rangili		
1976	Daku Rani Ganga		
1976	Sati Jasma Odan		
1976	Tapasya		
1977	Jay Vejay	Maharani of Malwa	
1977	Alibaba Marjinaa	Alibaba's mother	
1977	Dildaar	Laxmi C. Lal	
1977	Kabita		
1977	Dangal	Thakurain	
1977	Videsh	Sudha P. Sinha	
1978	College Girl		
1978	Ankhiyon Ke Jharokhon Se	Ruby Fernandes	
1978	Badaltey Rishtey	Mrs. Raghuvir Singh	
1978	Atithee	Mrs. M. Kumar	
1978	Besharam		
1978	Dillagi	Ramesh's mother	
1978	Kaala Aadmi		
1978	Phaansi	Mrs. Mahendra Pratap Singh	
1978	Toote Khilone		
1979	Taraana		
1979	Raadha Aur Seeta	Mrs. R.B. Verma	
1979	Manzil	Mrs. Khosla	
1979	Shikshaa	Laxmi D. Gupta	
1979	Aakhri Kasam	Zamindar's wife	
1979	Chambal Ki Rani		
1979	Saanch Ko Aanch Nahin	Mrs. Sharda M. Agarwal (Nirmala's mother)	
1980	Kismet	Ganga's Mother	
1980	Be-Reham	Chandramohan's Mother	
1980	Thodisi Bewafaii	Sujata Choudhary	
1980	Manokaamnaa	Mrs. Kashyap	
1980	The Burning Train	Mrs. Jagmohan (Randhir's mother)	
1980	Premika		
1980	Geet Gaata Chal	Ganga	
1980	Patthar Se Takkar	Radha P. Chand	
1980	Ram Balram	Saraswati	
1980	Sayyed Waris Shah		
1981	Meri Aawaz Suno	Mrs. Kaminidevi Kumar	
1981	Itni Si Baat	Brothel Madame	
1981	Ladies Tailor	Mehboob's Mother	
1981	Chhaya		
1981	Jwala Daku		
1981	Madine Ki Galian		
1981	Poonam	Chander & Sudha's mother	
1982	Swami Dada	Suresh's mother	
1982	Deedar-E-Yaar	Mrs. Changezi	
1982	Nikaah	Mrs. Ahmed	
1982	Badle Ki Aag	Geeta's Foster Mother	
1982	Meharbaani		
1982	Teesri Ankh	Inspector Om's wife	
1982	Baghavat	Amar's foster mother	
1982	Dulha Bikta Hai	Mrs. Walia	
1982	Brij Bhoomi		
1983	Sweekar Kiya Maine	Dindayal's wife	
1983	Rishta Kagaz Ka	Mrs. Kaul	
1983	Andhaa Kanoon	Mrs. Shrivastav	
1983	Mahaan	Guru's Foster Mother	
1983	Hero	Sandhya Mathur	
1984	Aaj Ki Awaz	Mrs. Varma	
1984	Tohfa		
1984	Qaidi	Mrs. Jugran (Dinesh's mother)	
1984	Raaj Tilak	Durga Singh	
1984	Shapath	Vijay's mother	
1985	Alag Alag	Rajni	
1985	Lallu Ram	Raju's mother	
1985	Maha Shaktimaan	Maharani Ahilya P. Singh	
1985	Ram Teri Ganga Maili	Tajeshwaribai	
1985	Bewafai	Mrs. Harihar Nath	
1985	Karishma Kudrat Kaa	Vijay's mother	
1985	Phaansi Ke Baad	Sapna's mother	
1986	Muddat	Mrs. Vikram Singh	
1986	Kaanch Ki Deewar	Jaswant's mother	
1986	Mera Haque	Amar's dadimaa	
1987	Superman	Superman's Mother	
1987	Kalyug Aur Ramayan	Mrs. Sharma	
1987	Insaniyat Ke Dushman	Sheetal	
1987	Mera Karam Mera Dharam	Shivani Sharma	
1987	Moti Verana Chawk Ma		
1988	Ek Naya Rishta	Mrs. Saxena	
1988	Mulzim	Mrs. Bhushan	
1989	Bahurani	Ganga (Madhuri's mother)	
1989	Abhimanyu	Savitri (Shyam Lal's wife)	
1989	Touhean	Gomtibai	
1989	Bade Ghar Ki Beti	Mrs. Kishan Lal	
1989	Clerk	Geeta	
1989	Mil Gayee Manzil Mujhe		
1989	Hum Intezaar Karenge	Jyoti's mother	
1990	Shadyantra	Hira's mother	
1990	Amiri Garibi	Mrs. Laxmi Narayan	
1990	Ghar Ho To Aisa	Neeta's mother-in-law	
1990	Jaan-E-Wafa		
1990	Karishma Kali Kaa	Shiv's mother	
1990	Karishma Kismat Ka		
1991	Jigarwala	Sohni's mother	
1992	Apradhi	Mrs. Vishamber Nath	
1992	Angaar	Manager – St. Mary's Orphanage	
1993	Professor Ki Padosan	Shobha's Mother	
1993	Izzat Ki Roti	Mrs. Ram Prasad	
1993	Dil Apna Aur Preet Paraee		
1993	Zakhmi Rooh	Shekhar's mother	
1994	Jai Maa Karwa Chauth	Shanti	
1995	Paappi Devataa	Mrs. Khan	
1995	Sajan Ka Dard		
1995	Samaj		
1998	Military Raaj		Posthumous release

== Television ==
Year	Show	Character/Role
1985–86	Paying Guest (TV series)	Sharda Trivedi

== See also ==
- List of Indian film actresses
