= Yari Dushmani =

- Directed by: Sikandar Khanna
- Starring: Sunil Dutt; Reena Roy; Amjad Khan
- Music by: Laxmikant–Pyarelal
- Release date: 1980
- Country: India
- Language: Hindi

Yari Dushmani is a 1980 Indian Bollywood film directed by Sikandar Khanna. It stars Sunil Dutt and Reena Roy in pivotal roles.

== Cast ==
- Sunil Dutt as Shankar
- Reena Roy as Pammi
- Amjad Khan as Birju
- Daljit Kaur as Komal
- Agha as Judge
- Bharat Bhushan as Catholic Priest
- Jankidas as Jumbu Dada
- Shakti Kapoor as Garjan Singh

== Soundtrack ==
Lyrics: Rajendra Krishan

| Song | Singer |
|---|---|
| "Hum Galiyon Ke Pale, Apne Haal Mein Hai Matwale" | Kishore Kumar, Manna Dey |
| "Sambhalkar Haseenon Se Aankhen Ladana" | Asha Bhosle, Mohammed Rafi |
| "Zulf Mahekegi Gardish Mein Jaam Aayega" | Asha Bhosle, Usha Mangeshkar |
| "Abba Abba, Abba Abba" | Asha Bhosle |
