= Chaar Maharathi =

- Promotional Poster
- Directed by: S. Waris Ali
- Written by: B.R. Ishaara, Bhooshan Banmali
- Produced by: S. Waris Ali
- Starring: Mithun Chakraborty; Tina Munim; Kader Khan; Amjad Khan; Om Shivpuri
- Music by: Sonik Omi
- Release date: 27 September 1985
- Running time: 137
- Country: India
- Language: Hindi

Chaar Maharathi is a 1985 Indian Hindi-language action drama film directed by S. Waris Ali. It stars Mithun Chakraborty, Kader Khan, Amjad Khan, Om Shivpuri in the title role, along with Tina Munim, Asha Parekh in the pivotal roles. The music was composed by music director, Sonik Omi.

== Plot ==
Suleman, Raju, John, and Shakti confronts with a dacoit Devi Singh while searching for hidden treasure of deceased Mr. Raina. Latter it reveals that Raju is the lost son of Mr. Raina.

== Cast ==
- Mithun Chakraborty as Raja
- Tina Munim as Phoolmati
- Asha Parekh as Sharda
- Kader Khan as Ustad Sulaiman
- Amjad Khan as Professor Shakti Singh
- Om Shivpuri as John
- Raza Murad as DSP Anil Kumar
- Dev Kumar as Devi Singh
- Bharat Kapoor as Ramesh
- Chandrashekhar as Police Chief Chandrashekhar

== Songs ==
Song	Singer
"Hamaar Jiyara Khoi Gawa"	Asha Bhosle
"Prem Sikhaike Premee Ne Yeh Kaam Kar Diya"	Asha Bhosle, Mohammed Aziz
"Banda Wahi Jo Allah Ki Karta Hai Bandagi"	Mahendra Kapoor, Anwar, Sonik Omi
"Mera Krishna Kanhaiya"	Aarti Mukherjee
