= Paanch Qaidi =

1981 film

- Poster
- Directed by: Shibu Mitra
- Produced by: Vikas-Veena Sharma
- Starring: Amjad Khan
- Music by: Bappi Lahiri
- Production company: Manish Films
- Release date: 19 June 1981
- Country: India
- Language: Hindi

Paanch Qaidi (transl. Five prisoners) is a 1981 Indian Hindi-language action film directed by Shibu Mitra and produced by Vikas-Veena Sharma. This film was released under the banner of Manish Films.

== Plot ==
Police Deputy Superident of Police Vijay takes five deadly convicts as his personal responsibility from the prison, knowing that they are all dangerous and have criminal records. Vijay and those outlaws settle in a village which is already terrorised by Mangal Singh and his group of dacoits. Vijay now wants to stop them with the help of his five prisoners.

== Cast ==
- Girish Karnad as DSP Vijay
- Zarina Wahab as Shanti, Wife of DSP
- Amjad Khan as Raja, Prisoner
- Mahendra Sandhu as Kaka, Prisoner
- Vijayendra Ghatge as Anand Raj, Prisoner
- Raza Murad as Balwant Singh, Prisoner
- Dev Kumar as Sher Singh, Prisoner
- Baldev Khosa as Jung Bahadur, Prisoner
- Manik Irani as Manakiya, Prisoner
- Shakti Kapoor as Constable Bismillah
- Sarika as Roopa
- Ranjeet as Dacait Mangal Singh
- Helen as Dancer
- Iftekhar as Inspector General of Police Jagmohan
- Surendra Pal as Police Inspector Surendra Pal Singh
- Viju Khote as Dacait Damodar
- Sulochana Latkar as Lajwanti
- Keshto Mukherjee as Drunkard
- Sundar as Murli

== Soundtrack ==
Song	Singer
"Maa To Hai Maa"	Kishore Kumar
"O Ripapa, O Ripapa"	Asha Bhosle
"Meri Mummy Jaisi Koi Mummy Nahin Hai"	Asha Bhosle; Chandrani Mukherjee
"Humne Suna Hai Aapne Loota"	Mubarak Begum; Shobha Gurtu
