= Lakhan (film) =

Balwant
- Directed by: Dinesh-Ramanesh
- Produced by: K.K. Jain; Kanti Kanakia; A. Sayeed Khan; A. Waheed Khan
- Starring: Amjad Khan; Ranjeet; Amrish Puri
- Music by: Sonik Omi
- Release date: 1979
- Country: India
- Language: Hindi

Lakhan is a 1979 Hindi film directed by Dinesh-Ramanesh.

== Cast ==
- Amjad Khan as Lakhan
- Ranjeet as Munna
- Amrish Puri as Diwan Hariprasad
- Navin Nischol as Vijay
- Ranjeeta Kaur as Lata
- Padma Khanna as Gulabjaan
- Chand Usmani as Maharani
