= Zamaanat =

- Theatrical release poster
- Directed by: A. Salaam
- Written by: B. B. Bhalla
- Screenplay by: Inderjeet Singh Tulsi
- Story by: Inderjeet Singh Tulsi
- Produced by: V. K. Sobti
- Starring: Jeetendra; Reena Roy; Amjad Khan; Bindu
- Cinematography: K. Ramanlal
- Edited by: Amrit Rana
- Music by: Sonik Omi; Lyrics: Indeevar
- Production company: Gautam Pictures
- Release date: 15 June 1977
- Country: India
- Language: Hindi

Zamaanat (transl. Bail) is a 1977 Indian Hindi-language action film, produced by V. K. Sobti under the Gautam Pictures banner and directed by A. Salaam. It stars Jeetendra, Reena Roy, Amjad Khan, and Bindu in lead roles, with music composed by Sonik Omi.

== Cast ==
- Jeetendra as Ravi
- Reena Roy as Reshma
- Amjad Khan as Ranveer / Rana
- Bindu as Rani
- Sujit Kumar as Rocky
- Ranjeet as Mangal
- Om Shivpuri as Rustam
- Yunus Parvez as Police Commissioner
- Mukri as Kalua
- Krishan Dhawan as John
- Chand Usmani as Parvati

== Soundtrack ==
Song	Singer
"Khile Na Kagaz Ka Kabhi Phool" (Male)	Kishore Kumar
"Khile Na Kagaz Ka Kabhi Phool" (Female)	Sulakshana Pandit
"Kaahe Mujhse Kare Tu Chhedchhad Budheya"	Mohammed Rafi, Asha Bhosle
"Teri Deewani Nachegi Gayegi"	Asha Bhosle
"Main Hoon Rani Jaduwali"	Asha Bhosle
