= Do Waqt Ki Roti =

- Directed by: Satpaal
- Produced by: M. P. Agarwal
- Starring: Feroz Khan; Sanjeev Kumar; Reena Roy; Sulakshana Pandit
- Music by: Laxmikant–Pyarelal
- Release date: 2 September 1988
- Country: India
- Language: Hindi

Do Waqt Ki Roti is a 1988 Indian Hindi-language film directed by Satpal and produced by M.P. Agrawal. It stars Feroz Khan, Sanjeev Kumar, Reena Roy, Sulakshana Pandit in pivotal roles. The music was composed by Laxmikant-Pyarelal.

The film took 6 years to complete, the major reason for halt in production being the death of Sanjeev Kumar in 1985 and Feroz Khan's temporary retirement from acting between 1982 and 1986 as he wanted spend more time with his family. By the time it released in 1988, Feroz Khan had taken another temporary retirement from acting between 1988 and 1991. Because of such long delay in production the aging of Feroz Khan was apparent as in some scenes he looked young with a more prominent hairline and in other scenes he looked aged with a receding hairline.

== Cast ==
- Feroz Khan as Shankar
- Sanjeev Kumar as Jailor Vijay Saxena
- Reena Roy as Shalini "Shalu"
- Sulakshana Pandit as Ganga
- Nirupa Roy as Kaushalya
- Amjad Khan as Tantia Bheel / Purshottam
- Shakti Kapoor as Thakur Shakti Singh
- Ranjeet as Jagga Singh
- Kamal Kapoor as Bhairav Singh
- Satyendra Kapoor as Dashrath
- Jagdeep as Pal Hukum Pravat Singh "Palan" Cart Driver

== Soundtrack ==
Song	Singer
"Kaisi Thi Woh Nazar"	Lata Mangeshkar
"Aaj Ki Raat Meri Gali Mein Aane Jaane Ki Koshish"	Lata Mangeshkar, Asha Bhosle
"Main Aayi, Main Aayi"	Asha Bhosle
"Kisi Pe Dil Ke Aane Se"	Asha Bhosle
"O Mata Kali Shaktishali"	Asha Bhosle, Chandrani Mukherjee
