= Garakh Nath Baba Tohe Khichari Charaibo =

Gorakhnath Baba Tohe Khichdee Chadhaibo
- Release date: 14 January 1986
- Country: India
- Language: Bhojpuri

Gorakhnath baba Tohe Khichdee Chadhaibo (Bhojpuri) was the first movie ever to be produced in the state of Uttar Pradesh, India. The cast and technicians were all from Gorakhpur, a prominent city of the eastern part of Uttar Pradesh. Production started in 1983, and it was released on 14 January 1986 on the auspicious day of Makar Sankranti at the then Shree Talkies of Gorakhpur, followed by other cinema halls in other parts. To mark the 25th anniversary of this event, it was released for a week at the Indralok Picture Palace at Gorakhpur on 14 January 2011.
