= Bhookh (1978 film) =

1978 film

- Directed by: H. Dinesh, Ramesh Puri
- Starring: Shatrughan Sinha; Reena Roy
- Music by: Sonik Omi
- Release date: 1978
- Country: India
- Language: Hindi

Bhookh is a 1978 Indian Hindi language Bollywood action film directed by H. Dinesh and Ramesh Puri.

== Plot ==
Dr. Ajay, who is a son of a bonded labour, Sarju returns to their native village to save the villagers from a ruthless Thakur Harnam Singh.

== Cast ==
- Shatrughan Sinha as Dr. Ajay
- Reena Roy as Bina
- Asha Sachdev as Asha
- Ranjeet as Chhote Thakur Ranjeet Singh
- Amjad Khan as Thakur Harnam Singh
- Om Shivpuri as Colonel
- Krishan Dhawan as Beena's Father
- Nazir Hussain as Maulvi
- Paintal as Bhikhari
- Dina Pathak as Mausi
- Indrani Mukherjee as Thakurain
- Ratnamala as Tulsi
- Aruna Irani as Courtesan
- Tarun Ghosh as Bhikhu.
- Dhanraj as Bagga.
