= Maan Gaye Ustaad =

- Directed by: Shibu Mitra
- Produced by: S. K. Kapur
- Starring: Shashi Kapoor; Hema Malini
- Music by: Sonik Omi
- Production company: Kapoor Films International
- Release date: 18 June 1981
- Country: India
- Language: Hindi

Maan Gaye Ustaad is a 1981 Indian Bollywood film directed by Shibu Mitra and produced by S.K. Kapur. It stars Shashi Kapoor, Hema Malini in pivotal roles.

== Cast ==
- Ashok Kumar as Jailor
- Shashi Kapoor as Kishan / Prince Daulat Singh
- Hema Malini as Geeta Singh / Princess Shabnam
- Bindu as Jaikishan's Assistant
- Ajit as Jaikishan J.K.
- Amjad Khan as Shera
- Om Prakash as Abba
- Pran as Chandan Singh

== Soundtrack ==
Song	Singer
"Allah Ka Naam Pak Hai"	Mohammed Rafi
"Mujhse Nazren Milane Ki Jurrat Na Kar"	Mohammed Rafi; Manna Dey
"Mera Ek Sawaal Hai, Sawaal Ka Jawab Do, Yeh Main Tumpe Chhodta Hoon"	Mohammed Rafi; Dilraj Kaur; Chandrani Mukherjee
"Ek Chhatri Aur Hum Hain Do, Ab Kya Ho"	Mohammed Rafi; Asha Bhosle
"Mehfil Mein Aanewalon"	Asha Bhosle
"Jawani Ki Kahani Bhi"	Asha Bhosle
"Mujhpe Bhi To Dalo"	Asha Bhosle
