= List of Hindi films of 1975 =

This is a list of films produced by the Bollywood film industry based in Mumbai in 1975:

== Highest-grossing films ==
These are the highest-grossing Hindi films of 1975. Gross collection figures are domestic, unless otherwise noted.

Rank	Title	Gross collection	Notes
1	Sholay	₹56.06 crore	Worldwide gross
2	Jai Santoshi Maa	₹10 crore	
3	Pratigya	₹9.90 crore	Worldwide gross
4	Sanyasi	₹9 crore	
5	Deewaar	₹7.50 crore	
6	Prem Kahani	₹5.06 crore	Worldwide gross
7	Dharmatma	₹5 crore	
8	Zakhmee	₹4.85 crore	Worldwide gross
9	Khel Khel Mein	₹4.50 crore	
10	Warrant	₹4 crore	

== A-Z ==
Title	Director	Cast	Genre	Sources
Aa Jaa Sanam	Yusuf Naqvi	Feroz Khan, Tanuja	Romance	
Aag Aur Toofan	Tanvir Ahmed	Mumtaz, Robin Kumar, Anwar Hussain, Rajan Haskar		
Aakhri Daao	A. Salaam	Jeetendra, Saira Banu, Iftekhar, Ranjeet, Danny Denzongpa	Crime Drama	Writer - Salim / Javed
Aakraman	J. Om Prakash	Ashok Kumar, Sanjeev Kumar, Rekha, Rakesh Roshan, Rajesh Khanna	War Drama	
Aandhi	Gulzar	Suchitra Sen, Sanjeev Kumar	Drama	
Amanush	Shakti Samanta	Uttam Kumar, Sharmila Tagore, Utpal Dutt	Action	
Anari	Asit Sen	Shashi Kapoor, Sharmila Tagore, Moushumi Chatterjee, Kabir Bedi, Kader Khan	Romance	
Andhera	Shyam Ramsay, Tulsi Ramsay	Sameer Khan, Vani Ganapathy	Horror	
Andolan	Lekh Tandon	Rakesh Pandey, Neetu Singh		
Anokha	Jugal Kishore	Shatrughan Sinha, Zarina Wahab (first film)		
Apne Dushman	Kailash Bandari	Reena Roy Dharmendra, Sanjeev Kumar		
Apne Rang Hazaar	Ravi Tandon	Sanjeev Kumar, Leena Chandavarkar, Danny Denzongpa, Bindu		
Badnaam	Dilip Bose	Nazima, Baldev Khosa, Sujit Kumar, Jalal Agha	Drama	
Balak Aur Janwar	Nanabhai Bhatt	Mohan Choti, Dulari, Kanan Kaushal, Baldev Khosa		
Biwi Kiraya Ki	Ajit Kumar	Indra Kumar, Sona Mirza, Jagdeep, Shuba Kohte	Drama	
Chaitali	Hrishikesh Mukherjee	Dharmendra, Saira Banu, Pradeep Kumar, Bindu	Drama	
Charandas Chor	Shyam Benegal	Smita Patil	Children's	
Chori Mera Kaam	Brij Sadanah	Shashi Kapoor, Zeenat Aman, Pran	Comedy	
Chupke Chupke	Hrishikesh Mukherjee	Dharmendra, Amitabh Bachchan, Jaya Badhuri, Sharmila Tagore	Romance	
Dafaa 302	K. Shrivastava	Randhir Kapoor, Rekha		
Deewaar	Yash Chopra	Amitabh Bachchan, Shashi Kapoor, Neetu Singh, Parveen Babi	Drama	
Dharam Karam	Randhir Kapoor	Raj Kapoor, Randhir Kapoor, Rekha	Drama	
Dharmatma	Feroz Khan	Feroz Khan, Hema Malini, Rekha, Danny Denzongpa, Premnath, Ranjeet, Jeevan	Action, Thriller	
Dhoti Lota Aur Chowpatty	Mohan Choti	Dharmendra, Mehmood, Helen		
Do Jasoos	Naresh Kumar	Shailendra Singh, Bhavana Bhatt, Raj Kapoor, Rajendra Kumar	Comedy, Drama	
Do Jhoot	Jitu Thakar	Vinod Mehra, Moushumi Chatterjee, Pran	Romance	
Do Thug	S. D. Narang	Shatrughan Sinha, Hema Malini		
Dulhan	C. V. Rajendran	Jeetendra, Hema Malini	Drama	
Ek Mahal Ho Sapno Ka	Devendra Goel	Dharmendra, Sharmila Tagore, Leena Chandavarkar	Drama	
Faraar	Shanker Mukherjee	Sanjeev Kumar, Sharmila Tagore, Amitabh Bachchan	Crime Drama	
Ganga Ki Kasam	B.S. Ranga	Anjana Mumtaz, Johnny Walker		
Geet Gaata Chal	Hiren Nag	Sachin, Sarika, Urmila Bhatt	Drama, Family, Musical, Comedy	
Hero	Shyam Benegal	Naseeruddin Shah		
Himalay Se Ooncha	B. S. Thapa	Sunil Dutt, Mallika Sarabhai, Ranjeet, Master Raju, Baby Bittoo	Adventure	
Jaan Hazir Hai	Manohar Nath Rangroo	Shekhar Kapur, Prem Krishen, Urmila Bhatt, Iftekhar, Vijay Anand		
Jaggu	Samir Ganguly	Shatrughan Sinha, Leena Chandavarkar	Crime Drama	
Jai Santoshi Maa	Vijay Sharma	Bharat Bhushan, Kanan Kaushal	Devotional	
Julie	K. S. Sethumadhavan	Vikram Makandar, Lakshmi, Nadira, Om Prakash, Sridevi (child artist)	Romance, Drama	
Kaagaz Ki Nao	B. R. Ishara	Raj Kiran, Sarika		
Kahte Hain Mujhko Raja	Biswajit Chatterjee	Dharmendra, Hema Malini, Biswajeet, Rekha		
Kaala Sona	Ravikant Nagaich	Feroz Khan, Parveen Babi	Curry Western	
Khel Khel Mein	Ravi Tandon	Rishi Kapoor, Neetu Singh, Rakesh Roshan	Drama	
Khushboo	Gulzar	Jeetendra, Hema Malini, Sharmila Tagore	Drama	
Lafange	Harmesh Malhotra	Randhir Kapoor, Mumtaz, Pran	Drama	
Mausam	Gulzar	Sanjeev Kumar, Sharmila Tagore	Romance	
Mazaaq	Haidar Ali	Vinod Mehra, Moushumi Chatterjee	Comedy	
Mere Sajna	Kewal Kumar	Navin Nischol, Raakhee	Drama	
Mere Sartaj	Abdul Rashid Kardar	Zaheera, Satish Kaul		
Mili	Hrishikesh Mukherjee	Amitabh Bachchan, Jaya Badhuri, Ashok Kumar	Romance	
Natak	Sohanlal Kanwar	Vijay Arora, Moushumi Chatterjee, Nazima, Sulochana Latkar	Drama	
Neelima	Pushpraj	Sunil Dutt, Vinod Mehra, Ranjeet, Zahida	Drama	
Nishant	Shyam Benegal	Anant Nag, Shabana Azmi, Sadhu Meher	Drama	
Ponga Pandit	Prayag Raj	Randhir Kapoor, Nita Mehta, Prema Narayan, Danny Denzongpa	Drama	
Pratigya	Dulal Guha	Dharmendra, Hema Malini, Ajit Khan	Action	
Prem Kahani	Raj Khosla	Rajesh Khanna, Mumtaz, Shashi Kapoor, Vinod Khanna	Drama	
Prem Parbat	Ved Rani	Rehana Sultan, Satish Kaul	Romance	
Qaid	Atma Ram	Vinod Khanna, Leena Chandavarkar, Mehmood	Action	
Rafoo Chakkar	Narender Bedi	Rishi Kapoor, Neetu Singh, Paintal	Comedy	
Raftaar	Dinesh-Ramanesh	Vinod Mehra, Moushumi Chatterjee	Action Drama	
Raaja	K. Shankar	Rishi Kapoor, Sulakshana Pandit	Drama	
Ranga Khush	Joginder	Bharat Bhushan, Dheeraj Kumar	Action	
Rani Aur Lalpari	Ravikant Nagaich	Jeetendra, Rajendra Kumar, Reena Roy, Neetu Singh, Asha Parekh, Feroz Khan	Action	
Romeo in Sikkim	Hari Kishan Kaul	Shyam Kumar, (First Gorkha Lead Actor in a Hindi Film), Ameena Kareem, Kundan, Rajan Haksar, Shyam Kumar, Dev Kishan, Raj Kamal, Om Prakash, Nazima, Poulson, Athithi Bhoomika, K N Singh, Mahamood Junior	Romance	
Saazish	Kalidas	Dharmendra, Saira Banu, Iftekhar, David	Action, Thriller, Suspense	
Salaakhen	A. Salaam	Shashi Kapoor, Sulakshana Pandit	Drama	
Sankalp	Ramesh Saigal	Sulakshana Pandit, Sukhdev, Farida Jalal	Drama	
Sanyasi	Sohanlal Kanwar	Manoj Kumar, Hema Malini, Prem Chopra, Pran	Drama	
Sewak	S. M. Abbas	Vinod Khanna, Neetu Singh		
Sholay	Ramesh Sippy	Sanjeev Kumar, Dharmendra, Amitabh Bachchan, Hema Malini, Jaya Badhuri, Amjad Khan, Mac Mohan, Sachin, Asrani, Jagdeep, Iftekhar	Drama, Action, Romance	
Sunehra Sansar	Adurthi Subba Rao	Rajendra Kumar, Hema Malini, Mala Sinha, Sujit Kumar	Drama	
Toofan	Kedar Kapoor	Vikram Makandar, Priyadarshini	Action Adventure	
Toofan Aur Bijlee	Homi Wadia	Zaheera, Arvind Kumar, Imtiaz, Randhawa, Bhagwan, Tun Tun, Mohan Choti, Habib	Action	
Tumhara Kalloo	Basu Bhattacharya	Kuldip Baghi, Kajri, Bharat Bhushan, Urmila Devi	Drama	
Uljhan	Raghunath Jhalani	Sanjeev Kumar, Sulakshana Pandit	Suspense Thriller	
Umar Qaid	Sikandar Khanna	Jeetendra, Vinod Mehra, Sunil Dutt, Reena Roy, Moushumi Chatterjee	Action	
Vandana	Narendra Suri	Parikshit Sahni, Sadhana Shivdasani, Sarika, Bindu	Drama	
Vardaan	Arun Bhatt	Vinod Mehra, Reena Roy, Mehmood	Drama	
Warrant	Pramod Chakravorty	Dev Anand, Zeenat Aman, Pran, Ajit Khan	Drama	
Zakhmee	Raja Thakur	Sunil Dutt, Asha Parekh, Reena Roy, Rakesh Roshan, Tariq Khan	Crime Drama	
Zameer	Ravi Chopra	Amitabh Bachchan, Saira Banu, Shammi Kapoor, Vinod Khanna	Drama	
Zinda Dil	Sikandar Khanna	Rishi Kapoor, Neetu Singh, Zaheera, Pran	Drama	
Zindagi Aur Toofan	Umesh Mathur	Sajid Khan, Rehana Sultan, Yogeeta Bali		
Zorro	Shibu Mitra	Navin Nischol, Rekha	Swashbuckler	

== See also ==
- List of Hindi films of 1974
- List of Hindi films of 1976
