= Bandie =

1978 Indian bilingual swashbuckler film

- Bengali poster of Bandie
- Directed by: Alo Sircar
- Adapted from: The Prisoner of Zenda (novel) by Anthony Hope; Jhinder Bondi (1961 film)
- Screenplay by: Jainendra Jain; Alo Sircar; Ashok Ghoshal
- Dialogues by: Bengali: Salil Sen; Ashok Ghoshal; Hindi: Kamleshwar
- Story by: Alo Sircar; Ashok Ghoshal; F. C. Mehra
- Produced by: F. C. Mehra
- Starring: Uttam Kumar; Utpal Dutt; Amjad Khan; Sulakshana Pandit; Amrish Puri; Bindu
- Cinematography: Pradeep Pai
- Edited by: Pran Mehra
- Music by: Shyamal Mitra
- Production company: Eagle Films
- Distributed by: Eagle Films
- Release dates: 10 March 1978 (Hindi); 14 April 1978 (Bengali)
- Country: India
- Languages: Bengali; Hindi

Bandie is a 1978 Indian bilingual swashbuckler action film simultaneously shot in Bengali and Hindi languages, co-written and directed by Alo Sircar. Produced by F. C. Mehra under the banner of Eagle Films, the film stars Uttam Kumar in dual roles, alongside an ensemble cast of Utpal Dutt, Amjad Khan, Sulakshana Pandit, Amrish Puri, Bindu, Iftekhar, Madan Puri and Prema Narayan, with Helen and Padma Khanna in special appearances.

The film is partially adapted from Anthony Hope's 1894 novel The Prisoner of Zenda, and had some plot similarities with the 1961 Bengali film Jhinder Bondi, also starring Kumar. The film marks the second collaboration between Sircar and Kumar after Chhoti Si Mulaqat (1967), and the Bengali debuts of Khan, Puri and Bindu. The screenplays of the two versions were written by Sircar, Ashok Ghoshal and Jayanendra Jain. Dialogues were written by Salil Sen and Ghoshal for the Bengali version and Kamleshwar for the Hindi version. Music of the film was composed by Shyamal Mitra, with lyrics penned by Gauriprasanna Mazumder and Salil Chowdhury for the Bengali version and Indeevar for the Hindi version. Pradeep Pai handled its cinematography, while Pran Mehra edited the film.

Bandie theatrically released with its Hindi version on 10 March 1978, while with its Bengali version on 14 April 1978, coinciding with Pohela Boishakh. It received mixed reviews from critics, with praise for its cast performances, songs, action sequences and technical aspects, but criticism for the film's plot and screenplay. It ran for over 35 weeks in West Bengal and became hit at the box office, but bombed in Hindi. The film emerged as the third highest grossing Bengali film of 1978. Bandie was remade into Telugu as Kaksha in 1980.

== Plot ==
Maharaj Brajvan lives a wealthy lifestyle in Bharatpur, along with his wife, Badi Rani, but have been unable to conceive for Bharatpur, and have no choice but to leave its reigns with Brajvan's widowed cousin, Vikram, and his son, Kanchan. When Vikram finds out that Badi Rani is pregnant, he plots to first sully her character by having her abducted, then shunned by Brajvan, and then decides to have her killed. But her killer has a change of heart and lets her live. She gives birth to a son, names him Bhola, and starts living a simple lifestyle in a Mandir with the help of its Poujari. Years later Vikram finds out she is alive and kills her, as well the Pujari and the Pujari's son. Bhola witnesses this, manages to escape, starts to live with a poor widow, grows up uneducated, and makes a living through crime. After a heist at Ramdas' residence, he goes on the run from the Police and ends up near Bharatpur where he is forcibly taken in by Senapati Raghuvir Singh and asked to pose as his look-alike Yuvraj Uday Singh, who is a womanizer and alcoholic, has been missing for several days, and to prevent Kanchan being crowned the Maharaj. Bhola agrees to this charade, meets Uday's future fiancée, Rajkumari Radha of Rampur, as well as her ravishing assistant, Krishna, rescues her and both fall in love much to the chagrin of Kanchan who wants to wed Radha. Little does Bhola know that it is Kanchan who has lured Uday, by first getting him seduced by Vimla, and is now holding him prisoner in a dungeon, has plans to kill him on his birthday, and then expose Bhola as a fraud and eventually have him killed too.

== Cast ==
- Uttam Kumar in dual role as
  - Bhola, a thief: Brajvan and Badi Rani's eldest and lost son; Radha's love interest
    - Vishal Desai (credited as Master Bittoo) as Young Bhola
  - Yuvraj Uday B. Singh: the king of Bharatpur; Brajvan and Badi Rani's younger son; Bhola's twin brother
- Sulakshana Pandit as Rajkumari Radha S. Singh: Sujan's daughter; the princess of Rampur
- Utpal Dutt as Vikram Singh, Brajvan's younger brother
- Amjad Khan as Kanchan Singh, Vikram's son
- Amrish Puri as Ananda, Kanchan's right-hand man
- Bindu as Bimala, Ananda's love interest
- Satyen Kappu as Maharaj Brajvan Singh; Bhola and Uday's father
- Madan Puri as the Diwan of Bharatpur
- Iftekhar as Senapati Raghuveer Singh, the Royal Commander of Bharatpur
- Indrani Mukherjee as Badi Rani
- Amarnath Mukherjee (credited as Amar Nath) as Raja Sujan Singh, the King of Rampur
- Tarun Ghosh as Chandravadan, the spy of Bharatpur
- Prema Narayan as Krishna
- Manik Dutt as Ramdas
- Asit Sen
- Chandrima Bhaduri as Bhola's foster mother
- Shivraj as Pujari
- Raju Shrestha as Pujari's son

=== Special appearances ===
- Helen as a dancer in the song "Ei Jiboner Daam Je Onek" (Bengali) / "Honth Bhale Inkaar Kare" (Hindi)
- Padma Khanna

== Soundtrack ==
Bandie

Soundtrack album to Bandie by Shyamal Mitra
- Released: Bengali: 31 December 1978; Hindi: 3 December 1978
- Recorded: 1977–78
- Genre: Feature film soundtrack
- Length: Bengali: 23:26; Hindi: 24:53
- Producer: Shyamal Mitra

Shyamal Mitra chronology
Ananda Ashram (1977)	Bandie (1978)	Nishan (1978)

Songs and score of the film are composed by Shyamal Mitra. Gauriprasanna Mazumder and Salil Chowdhury penned the Bengali lyrics, while Indeevar penned the Hindi lyrics.

=== Bengali ===
Track listing
No.	Title	Lyrics	Singer(s)	Length
1.	"Ke Bole Bijli Shudhu"	Gauriprasanna Mazumder	Asha Bhosle	3:32
2.	"Mone Hoy Swarge Achhi"	Gauriprasanna Mazumder	Kishore Kumar	3:17
3.	"Ei Jiboner Daam Je Onek"	Gauriprasanna Mazumder	Asha Bhosle	4:59
4.	"Ogo Saathi Go"	Gauriprasanna Mazumder	Shyamal Mitra, Sulakshana Pandit	6:20
5.	"Mone Na Rong Lagle"	Salil Chowdhury	Kishore Kumar, Asha Bhosle	5:18
Total length:				23:26

=== Hindi ===
Track listing
No.	Title	Singer(s)	Length
1.	"Dil Use Dungi"	Asha Bhosle	3:18
2.	"Hath Mein Jaam Na Loon"	Kishore Kumar	4:47
3.	"Honth Bhale Inkaar Kare"	Asha Bhosle	5:10
4.	"Jise Yaar Ka Sachcha Pyaar Mile"	Kishore Kumar, Sulakshana Pandit	6:22
5.	"Rang Na Mann Rang Mein Agan"	Kishore Kumar, Asha Bhosle	5:16
Total length:			24:53
