= Garam Khoon =

- Poster
- Directed by: A. Salam
- Written by: Tej Nath Zar
- Produced by: Tej Nath Zar
- Starring: Vinod Khanna; Sulakshana Pandit; Ajit
- Cinematography: Shyam Rao Shiposkar
- Edited by: Madhu Adsule
- Music by: Shankar Jaikishan
- Release date: 28 February 1980
- Country: India
- Language: Hindi

Garam Khoon (transl. Hot Blood) is a 1980 Hindi-language action film. Produced and written by Tej Nath Zar and directed by A. Salam. The film stars Vinod Khanna, Sulakshana Pandit, Bindu in lead roles and Ajit as main antagonist. The film's music is by Shankar Jaikishan

== Plot ==
Sood Saheb (Nazir Hussain) is a rich & reputed industrialist in the city. He has a beautiful wife (Sulochana) and twin sons, Babloo & Ravi. Vishal (Ajit) the cunning manager of Sood Industries secretly works for an underworld don, Rajan Seth. When he is caught red-handed and fired by Sood, Vishal kidnaps Babloo as an act of revenge.

Babloo (Vinod Khanna) grows up to become a criminal working for Vishal. Ravi (Vinod Khanna) takes care of his father's business and is engaged to Rama. Rajan sends Babloo to Ravi's place to take over the business and property. Will the brothers recognize each other? Will the whole family be together? Will Vishal get punishment for his bad deeds?

== Cast ==
- Vinod Khanna as Ravi Sood / Babloo aka Johny(double role)
- Sulakshana Pandit as Rama
- Ajit as Vishal
- Nazir Hussain as Sood Saheb
- Sulochana as Mrs. Sood
- Helen as Dancer
- Bindu as Pummy
- K.N. Singh as Police Commissioner Singh
- Imtiaz Khan as Gullu
- Satish Kaul as Inspector
- Shashi Puri as dancer
- Keshto Mukherjee as Bajrang
- Dhumal as Sadashiv
- Brahamchari as Shersingh
- Ganja Shetty as Swami
- Shivraj as Pandit Ji
- Rajan Haksar as Rajan Seth

== Music ==
Track listing
No.	Title	Lyrics	Music	Singer(s)	Length
1.	"Tu Jaha Mai Waha"	Hasrat Jaipuri	Shankar Jaikishan	Kishore Kumar	3.04
2.	"Achhi Bhi Lagti Hu Sundar Bhi"	Vithalbhai Patel	Shankar Jaikishan	Lata Mangeshkar	3.07
3.	"Pardesiya Tere Desh Me"	Singhar	Shankar Jaikishan	Sulakshana Pandit, Mohammed Rafi	3.09
4.	"Ek Chehra Dil Ke Kareeb"	Singhar	Shankar Jaikishan	Lata Mangeshkar	3.00
5.	"Paina Loopi Keh Ke Pukaro"	Singhar	Shankar Jaikishan	Asha Bhosle	5:11
Total length:					17:31
