= Salaakhen =

Salaakhen may refer to:

- Salaakhen (1975 film), a 1975 Indian Hindi-language film
- Salaakhen (1998 film), a 1998 Indian Indian Hindi-language film
