= Shashi Puri =

Indian actor

Shashi Puri is an Indian actor who appeared in Hindi Bengali and Punjabi films. He also did a few Punjabi films including Saali Adhi Gharwali, Duja Viah, Udeekan Saun Diyan, Jako Rakhe Saiyan etc.

== Filmography ==
=== Hindi ===
- Grahan (1972)
- Do Khiladi (1976) as Shibu
- Dada as Shashi
- Aayi Tere Yaad (1980)
- Manokaamnaa (1980) as Vikas' brother (uncredited)
- Maan Abhiman (1980) as Dr. Ravikant
- Khoon Kharaba (1980) as Anil
- Jazbaat (1980) as Deepak
- Garam Khoon (1980)
- Mangalsutra (1981) as Vijay's friend
- Dard (1981)
- Jwala Daku (1981) as Dr. Ravi
- Begunaah Qaidi (1982)
- Patthar Ki Lakeer (1982)
- Tumhare Bina (1982) as Dutt's neighbour
- Rustom (1982)
- Avtaar (1983) as Ramesh Krishen
- Arpan (1983) as Rakesh
- Ek Din Bahu Ka (1983) as Madhu's Boyfriend
- Marriage Bureau (1984)
- Phulwari (1984) as Rajiv Mathur
- Haqeeqat (1985 film) as Uma Shanker Baghi
- Khushi (1986)
- Amrit (1986) as Shrikant Srivastav
- Karma (1986) as Anil
- Pati Paisa Aur Pyar (1987)
- Ranima (1987)
- Aurat Teri Yehi Kahani (1988) as Ketan
- Dariya Dil (1988) as Ajay
- Ajnabi Saaya (1989)
- Apne Begaane (1989)
- Ashrita (1990)
- Aulad Ke Khatir (1990)
- Jamai Raja (1990) as Dheeraj
- Kasam Kali Ki (1991)
- Bhabhi (1991) as Inspector Sudhir
- Benaam Badsha (1991) as Doctor
- Aaj Kie Aurat (1993) as Doctor Pankaj Sheth
- Meri Aan (1993) as Advocate Mahesh Agarwal
- Sangdil Sanam (1994) as Police Commissioner
- Jeena Nahin Bin Tere (1995)
- Kaun Rokega Mujhe (1997) as Mohan
- Dil Ke Jharoke Main (1997) as Advocate Suresh
- Peenghan Pyar Diyan (1998)
- Phir Wohi Awaaz (1998)

=== Punjabi ===
- Ankhilli Mutiyar (1983) as Ratan Chaudhary
- Duja Viah (1984)
- Takraar (1984)
- Jako Rakhe Saiyan (1986)
- Suneha (1987)
- Sharika (1989)
- Hukumat Jatt Di (1990)
- Udeekan Saun Diyan (1991)
- Saali Adhi Gharwali (1993) as Amar
