= Ram Rajya (1967 film) =

- Directed by: Vijay Bhatt
- Based on: Ramayana by Valmiki
- Produced by: Shankarbhai Bhatt
- Starring: Bina Rai; Kumar Sen; Kanhaiyalal; Farida dadi
- Cinematography: Pravin Bhatt
- Edited by: Pratap Dave
- Music by: Vasant Desai; Bharat Vyas (lyrics)
- Production company: Shri Prakash Pictures
- Distributed by: Moonlight Film Distributors
- Release date: 1967
- Running time: 175 minutes
- Country: India
- Language: Hindi

Ram Rajya (The Kingdom Of Rama) is an Indian 1967 Hindi religious film based on Valmiki's Ramayana and directed by Vijay Bhatt. The film was produced by Shankarbhai Bhatt. The music director was Vasant Desai with lyrics written by Bharat Vyas. The cinematographer was Pravin Bhatt and the film starred Bina Rai, Kumar Sen, Badri Prasad, Kanhaiyalal, Farida dadi, Anil Kumar, Jay Vijay.

The film was a combination of Valmiki's Ramayana, with Tulsidas' Ramcharitmanas and Bhavbhuti's play "Uttar Ramcharit" according to the credit roll, and a remake of Bhatt's classic film of the 1940s of the same name. This time the film was in colour and instead of Shobhana Samarth, it had Bina Rai as Sita. However, as cited in "Illustrated Weekly of India", Rai's role as the "masochistic Indian woman" towards the end of Rai's career as an actress disappointed the audiences and she was unacceptable as Sita.

== Plot ==
Rama returns to Ayodhya after being banished for fourteen years to the forest by his father Dashratha on the say of his second wife Kaikeyi. Rama's wife Sita and his brother Lakshmana had accompanied him in his exile. Sita was kidnapped by Ravan, King of Lanka, a war ensued with the death of Ravan and rescue of Sita. Valmiki in his hermitage has completed his epic Ramayana, and sends a messenger to King Rama asking permission to have it recited to him at his court. Good news arrives that Sita is expecting. However, things are set in motion when a washerwoman comes for justice as her husband throws her out of the house when her virtue is questioned as under unforeseen circumstances she spends the night with a man other than her husband. Things spiral out of control when the washerman and the public of Ayodhya question Sita's virtue following her forced captivity at Lanka. Sita has to go through a test of fire but even then the talk continues and Rama is forced to banish her to the forest. Lakshman takes her there and tells her of Rama’s intention of forsaking her. Appalled she jumps into the Ganga, but is saved by the sage Valmiki. Being pregnant, he reminds her of her duty as a queen and the need for her to provide heirs. She stays in the hutment anonymously and gives birth to twins called Luv and Kusha. Time passes and Rama is miserable with the step he had to take. Sage Vashishta has arranged for a Yagna to be performed by Rama. Valmiki's Ramayana is read by the boys and they sing out the verses. The twins meet are taken by Valmiki to Ayodhya to attend the Yagna. The children are unaware of their lineage. Valmiki makes them recite the story he has written which impresses Rama but he too is unaware of who the boys are. Finally after a short war between father and sons, they are united along with Sita.

== Cast ==
- Kumarsen
- Bina Rai
- Badri Prasad
- Gopi Krishna
- Kanhaiyalal
- Aruna Rai
- Jeevankala
- Narbada Shankar
- Ved Puri
- Manjari
- Snehlata
- Bhavna

== Crew ==
The crew consisted of:

- Director: Vijay Bhatt
- Producer: Shankerbhai Bhatt
- Distributors: Moonlight Film Distributors.
- Editing: Pratap Dave
- Music: Vasant Desai
- Lyrics: Bharat Vyas
- Camera: Pravin Bhatt
- Choreographer: Gopi Krishna
- Art and set Director: Kanu Desai

== Vijay Bhatt And Ramayana ==
Vijay Bhatt had earlier made several films based on the epic Ramayana, which included Bharat Milap (1942), Ram Rajya (1943) and Rambaan (1948) and they had all proved successful at the box-office. Bhatt is cited by Rajadhyaksha and Willemen as stating that his "interest in Hindu fantasy was a logical extension of his Gandhian sympathies".

== Soundtrack ==
The highlight of the soundtrack was a Ragmala composed by music director Vasant Desai with lyrics by Bharat Vyas performed by Kathak dancer Gopi Krishna and actress Snehlata. Desai had a "penchant" for using Raga Malhar in songs like "Dar Laage Garje Badariya" sung by Lata Mangeshkar. According to Raju Bharatan, Vasant Desai had been chosen as a recipient for the inaugural 'Dr. Brihaspati Award", later known as the "Saraswati Award", but it was pointed out by composer Naushad that two of the songs from the 1967 Ram Rajya were "replicate" songs from the original Ram Rajya (1943) composed for it by Shankar Rao Vyas. The award (Saraswati Award) that year (1968) went to Naushad for the film Palki (1967). The playback singers were Lata Mangeshkar, Mohammed Rafi, Manna Dey, Suman Kalyanpur and Usha Timothy.

=== Songlist ===
#	Title	Singer
1	"Koti Koti Kirnon Wale Aditya Surya Bhagwan"	Manna Dey
2	"Gaao Ri Shubh Din Aaya"	Lata Mangeshkar
3	"Tha Andhera Chhaya Huaa"	Manna Dey
4	"Aaja Tujh Bin Sadhna Meri Adhoori"	Lata Mangeshkar, Mohammed Rafi
5	"Dar Laage Garje Badariya"	Lata Mangeshkar
6	"Hato Jaao Mat Chhedo Balam"	Lata Mangeshkar, Mohammed Rafi
7	"Rain Bhayi So Ja Re Panchhi"	Lata Mangeshkar
8	"Vidhi Ne Dekho" (Male)	Mohammed Rafi
9	"Vidhi Ne Dekho" (Duet)	Suman Kalyanpur, Mohammed Rafi
10	"Neele Neele Gagan Tale"	Usha Timothy, Manna Dey
11	"Haule Haule Jhulaniya Re Jhulao"	Lata Mangeshkar
12	"Valmiki Ke Mahakavya Ki"	Usha Timothy, Asha Bhosle
13	"Aaj Chali Main Maa Ki God Mein"	Lata Mangeshkar, Manna Dey
