= Railway Platform (film) =

- Directed by: Ramesh Saigal
- Written by: Ramesh Saigal
- Produced by: Keval Krishan
- Starring: Sunil Dutt; Nalini Jaywant; Sheila Ramani
- Cinematography: Dronacharyya
- Edited by: Baburao Barodkar
- Music by: Madan Mohan
- Release date: 4 February 1955
- Country: India
- Language: Hindi

Railway Platform is a 1955 Indian film about a love triangle between a princess, a poor man and his lover at a train station. The film marked the debut of Sunil Dutt, who was an announcer for Radio Ceylon.

== Cast ==
- Sunil Dutt as Ram
- Nalini Jaywant as Naina
- Sheila Ramani as Princess Indira
- Johnny Walker as Naseebchand
- Raj Mehra as Raja Sahib
- Leela Mishra as Ram's Mother
- Manmohan Krishna as Kavi
- Nana Palsikar as Station Master
- Jagdeep as Bag Snatcher
- Ram Avtar as Priest
- Kartar Singh (uncredited) as Sikh man in the station master room
- Shukla
- S.Sethy
- Babby Sheela
- Manmohan Krishna
- Uma Devi
- Nishi Kohli
- Nana Palsikar
- Moolchand

== Production ==
Ramesh Saigal was impressed with Sunil Dutt's good looks and voice. He gave opportunity to Dutt for acting. But at first, Dutt was nervous before the camera, especially in romantic scenes. He had never mixed freely with girls. His worst moment came when Saigal got furious and scolded him. In fact, the scenes were shot several times before Dutt got it right. Deeply embarrassed, Dutt resolved that if he ever directed a film, he would be more sensitive to his actors’ feelings.

== Songs ==
- "Dekh tere sansar ki halat kya ho gayi bhagwan " -Artists: Mohammed Rafi, Manmohan Krishna, Shiv Dayal Batish
- "Basti Basti Parvat Parvat Gata Jaye Banjara" - Artist: Mohammed Rafi
- "Basti Basti Parbat Parbat" (Part- II) - Artist: Manmohan Krishna
- "Sone Chandi Me Tulta Ho Jaha Dilo Ka Pyar" - Artist: Mohammed Rafi
- "Mast Sham Hai Hatho Me Jaam Hai" - Artist: Asha Bhosle, Shiv Dayal Batish
- "Bhajo Ram Bhajo Ram, Mori Baah Pakad Lo Ram" - Artist: Asha Bhosle, Shiv Dayal Batish
- "Sakhi Re Tori Doliya Uthayenge Kahar" - Artist: Lata Mangeshkar
- "Chand Maddham Hai, Aashma Chup Hai" - Artist: Lata Mangeshkar
- "Jiya Kho Gaya O Tera Ho Gaya" - Artist: Lata Mangeshkar
- "Andher Nagari Chaupat Raja" - Artists: Mohammed Rafi, Asha Bhosle, Manmohan Krishna, Shiv Dayal Batish
