= Imtiaz Khan =

Indian film actor (1942–2020)

- Born: Zecharian Khan; 15 October 1942; Peshawar, British India
- Died: 15 March 2020 (aged 77); Mumbai, Maharashtra, India
- Occupations: Actor; director
- Known for: Yaadon Ki Baaraat (1973)
- Height: 1.90 m (6 ft 3 in)
- Spouse(s): Kruttika Desai; Roshan Khan
- Partner: Anju Mahendru (1972-1979)
- Children: Ayesha Khan
- Father: Jayant
- Relatives: Amjad Khan (brother)

Imtiaz Khan (born Zecharian Khan; 15 October 1942 – 15 March 2020) was an Indian actor and film and television director in Bollywood.

== Early life ==
Khan was born to a Pashtun Muslim family in Peshawar, British India. Khan was the son of the actor Jayant and younger brother of actor Amjad Khan.

His nephews are Seemaab Khan, a club cricketer, and actor Shadaab Khan while his niece is Ahlam Khan, an actress and screenwriter.

== Career ==
He started his acting career as a child in the film Nazneen (1951), which also marked the acting debut of his elder brother.

== Personal life ==
Khan was married twice. His first marriage was in 1985 to Roshan Khan, a junior artiste in films. His second marriage was to Kruttika Desai until his death in 2020. Together they adopted a daughter. Their daughter, Ayesha Khan, is a model and actor.

== Filmography ==
As Actor

Year	Tile	Role	Notes
1951	Nazneen	Child artist	Debut film, Uncredited
1954	Watan	Child artist	
1962	Gyara Hazar Ladkian	Puran's friend	
1970	Patni		
1972	Do Bachche Dus Haath	Jingaru	
1973	Do Gaz Zameen Ke Neeche	Anand	
1973	Yaadon Ki Baaraat	Roopesh	
1974	Apradhi	Ranjeet	
1974	Faslah	Gopal 'Gogi'	
1974	Raja Kaka	Daamu Dada	
1975	Toofan Aur Bijlee	Boss	
1975	Dayar-E-Madina		
1975	Anokha	Shambhu Khanna	
1975	Andhera	Ranjeet	
1975	Dharmatma	Kundan	
1975	Zakhmee	Tiger	
1975	Pratigya	Raghu	
1975	Kaala Sona	Bahadur	
1975	Zorro	Shamsher Singh	
1975	Apne Dushman	William	
1975	Jaggu	Kaalia	
1976	Dus Numbri	Veeru	
1976	Kabeela	Durjan	
1976	Ginny Aur Johnny	Inspector	Friend of Amjad
1977	Hunterwali 77		
1977	Maha Badmaash	Mike	
1977	Zehreeli	Vijay	
1978	Jalan		
1978	Darwaza	Shakaal	
1978	Besharam	Tony	
1978	Khoon Ka Badla Khoon	Ranjeet	
1978	Parmatma	Bhairon Singh	
1979	Aakhri Kasam	Sangram Singh	
1979	Aulea-E-Islam		
1979	Ratnadeep		
1980	Lahu Pukarega		
1980	Ganga Aur Suraj		
1980	The Naxalites	Haider Khan	
1980	Chaal Baaz		
1980	Garam Khoon	Gullu	Vishal's Son
1982	Pyara Dost	Aamir	
1983	Chor Police	Dubai Police Chief	
1985	Ameer Aadmi Gharib Aadmi	Lal	
1985	Telephone	Yusuf	
1986	Siyahi		
1986	Sone Ka Pinjra		
1986	Kala Dhanda Goray Log	Upadhyay / Jagat Narayan	
1986	Tahkhana	Shakaal	
1986	Baat Ban Jaye	Jayant Amar Nath	
1986	Mohabbat Ki Kasam	Raghu	
1987	Raat Ke Andhere Mein		
1987	Godna		
1987	Mr. X	Ramesh Tejwani	
1987	Dak Bangla	Devil's priest	
1988	Anjaam Khuda Jaane	Lal	
1988	Dayavan	Anna	
1989	Mera Naseeb		
1992	Zulm Ki Hukumat	Natwar Soorma	
1992	Waqt Ka Badshah	Ratanlal Seth	
1994	Mr. Shrimati		TV movie
1994	Gopi Kishan	Retired Police Commissioner	
1995	Hulchul	Shivyendu Malik	Police Commissioner
1997	Share Bazaar		
1998	Qatil Chandalini		TV movie
1998	Guru Gobind Singh		
2000	Gang	Girja Singh	
2005	Bunty Aur Babli		

As Director

Year	Tile	Role	Notes
1982	Pyara Dost	Director	Film
1985	Chhun Chhun Karti Aayee Chidiya	Director	Video
1962	Deewarein	Director	TV Series
2000	Noorjahan	Director	TV Series

As Technical support

Year	Tile	Role	Notes
2004	Inteqam: The Perfect Game	Camera attendant	
2004	Hulchul	Lighting technician	
2007	Dahek: A Restless Mind	Focus puller	

== Death ==
On 15 March 2020 Khan died in Mumbai.
