= Hera Pheri (1976 film) =

1976 Hindi movie directed by Prakash Mehra

- Poster
- Directed by: Prakash Mehra
- Written by: Satish Bhatnagar; Vijay Kaul
- Produced by: Satyendra Pal
- Starring: Amitabh Bachchan; Saira Banu; Vinod Khanna; Sulakshana Pandit; Pinchoo Kapoor; Asrani
- Cinematography: N. Satyen
- Edited by: K.H. Mayekar; Jayant Adhikari
- Music by: Kalyanji-Anandji
- Production company: Chaudhary Enterprises
- Distributed by: Chaudhary Enterprises; Prakash Mehra Productions
- Release date: 1 October 1976
- Country: India
- Language: Hindi

Hera Pheri (Translation|Foul Play) is a 1976 Hindi masala film directed by Prakash Mehra and starring Amitabh Bachchan, Saira Banu, Vinod Khanna, Sulakshana Pandit, Shreeram Lagoo and Asrani. The film's music is by Kalyanji–Anandji and the lyrics were by Anjaan, Indeevar.

Vinod Khanna received a Filmfare nomination for Best Supporting Actor. This is one of six films that Vinod Khanna and Amitabh Bachchan starred together in. At the time, the pairing of the two actors often made the film quite successful, especially since both actors were rising stars gunning for the top spot in Hindi Cinema. The movie was an inspiration for the 1978 Telugu movie Rama Krishnulu.

== Plot ==
Vijay and Ajay operate a scheme in which they trick corrupt individuals and criminals out of money. They work together closely across various activities, such as posing as holy men, playing card games, and negotiating their way through difficult situations.

Their world starts to unravel when old family secrets surface. Vijay learns that the man responsible for his father's death may be tied directly to Ajay — possibly even Ajay's own father, long thought lost. That discovery poisons the friendship. The easy trust between them curdles into suspicion and anger, and the film pivots hard from breezy con-artist comedy into a much darker story of betrayal and revenge, dragging in a vengeful mother figure and a string of dangerous men from both their pasts. Saira Banu and Sulakshana Pandit play the women caught in the middle as love interests to the two leads, while a police commissioner circles the growing chaos.

Everything builds toward a final revelation that re-contextualizes earlier events - prompting a re-evaluation of the first half of the movie.

== Cast ==
- Amitabh Bachchan as Vijay
- Saira Banu as Kiran Singh
- Vinod Khanna as Ajay
- Sulakshana Pandit as Asha
- Shreeram Lagoo as Police Commissioner Khanna
- Pinchoo Kapoor as P.K. / Ghanshyamdas
- P. Jairaj as Dinanath
- Asrani as the real son of PK
- Yunus Parvez as Dhaniram
- Mohan Sherry as Sherry
- Urmila Bhatt as Sudha
- Dev Kumar as Mr. Khatlewala
- Mac Mohan as Mac
- Randhir (actor) as Baba
- Goga Kapoor as Goga (as Goga)
- Ram Sethi as Drunk in Casino
- Vikas Anand as Casino Manager
- Padma Khanna as Jean, casino girl
- Tun Tun as Mrs. Dhaniram
- Moolchand

== Soundtrack ==
No.	Title	Singer(s)	Length
1.	"Waqt Ki Hera Pheri Hai"	Kishore Kumar, Mahendra Kapoor	07:46
2.	"Barson Puarana Ye Yarana"	Kishore Kumar	04:46
3.	"Aap Ka Sakar Kya Kuchh"	Asha Bhosle	03:57
4.	"Mujhe Pyar Mein Khat"	Asha Bhosle	04:00
5.	"Kaun Anjaam-E-Ulfat Nahin Janta"	Lata Mangeshkar	03:32
Total length:			24:01

== Awards ==
Award	Category	Nominee	Result
Filmfare Awards	Best Supporting Actor	Vinod Khanna	Nominated
