= Anokha =

1975 film

- Movie Poster
- Directed by: Jugal Kishore
- Written by: Roshanlal Bhardwaj
- Produced by: Jugal Kishore, Jugal Productions
- Starring: Shatrughan Sinha; Zarina Wahab; A.K. Hangal; Jeevan
- Edited by: Satish Kumar Bajaj
- Music by: Kalyanji Anandji
- Release date: 2 April 1975
- Country: India
- Language: Hindi

Anokha is a 1975 Hindi-language action drama film directed by Jugal Kishore. It is one of the first film where Shatrughan Sinha signed as a hero.

== Cast ==
- Shatrughan Sinha - Ram/Anokha/Shambu Khanna
- Zarina Wahab - Sudha Manchanda
- A.K. Hangal
- Jeevan
- Kanhaiyalal
- Jayshree T.
- Paintal
- Meena T.
- Imtiaz Khan - Shambhu Khanna

== Music ==
Song title	Singers
"Meri Batonse Tum Bore Ho Gai"	Kishore Kumar, Usha Timothy
"Apna Desh Videsh Ke Aagey"	Mukesh
"Jaaneman Aap Humse Mohabbat"	Mohammad Rafi, Suman Kalyanpur
"Jab Aai Hai Gaonse Hamar Goribala"	Mahendra Kapoor, Amit Kumar & chorus
"Dharti Hai Hamari Jaan"	Mohammed Rafi
