= Jaggu =

- Poster
- Directed by: Samir Ganguly
- Produced by: Ratan Mohan
- Starring: Shatrughan Sinha; Leena Chandavarkar
- Music by: Sonik Omi
- Production company: R. M. Art Productions
- Release date: 18 April 1975
- Country: India
- Language: Hindi

Jaggu is a 1975 Bollywood crime film directed by Samir Ganguly and produced by Ratan Mohan.

== Plot ==
Jaggu is as good hearted person turned into criminal. He rescues a widow's daughter abducted by his boss and eventually marries her, but his boss sends a former associate to bump him off.

== Cast ==
- Shatrughan Sinha as Jagtap aka Jaggu
- Leena Chandavarkar as Geeta
- Master Bhagwan as Qawal
- Mohan Choti as Pandit
- Anwar Hussain as Desai
- Imtiaz as Kaalia
- Aruna Irani as Courtesan
- Jagdeep as Birju
- Bindu as Cabaret Dancer
- Viju Khote as Baniya
- Paintal as Nandu Khade
- Purnima as Geeta's mom
- Shivraj as Kedar
- Nipon Goswami
- Jyoti as Sayeeda
- Azaad Irani as Azad

== Music ==
1. "Pyaar Me Tere Piya Aisa Thadpa Hai Jiya" – Lata Mangeshkar
2. "Chanda Kiran Pyaasi Hai" – Asha Bhosle
3. "Mere Naam Ka Chala Hai Yeh Jaam" – Asha Bhosle
4. "Kasme Dekhe Vaade Dekhe" – Asha Bhosle
5. "Mere Dum Se Chand Tare" – Aziz Nazan, Narendra Chanchal, Kumar Sonik
6. "Meri Payal Chanke Chanak" – Lata Mangeshkar
