= Ghar Ki Shobha =

- Directed by: Harshadrai Mehta; Ramesh Saigal
- Produced by: Magnet Pictures
- Starring: Karan Dewan; Swaran Lata; Dixit; Yashodhra Katju
- Music by: Allarakha Khan
- Release date: 1944
- Country: India
- Language: Hindi

Ghar Ki Shobha is a Bollywood film. It was released in 1944. The film was directed by Harshadrai Mehta and Ramesh Saigal. The music was composed by Allahrakha Khan with lyrics by Roopbani. The cast included Karan Dewan, Swaran Lata, Jagdish Sethi, Dixit, Yashodhra Katju and Fazlu.

== Cast ==
- Karan Dewan
- Swaran Lata
- Jagdish Sethi
- Dixit
- Yashodhra Katju
- Fazlu

== Soundtrack ==
The music director was Allahrakha, and the lyricist was Roopbani. The singers were Rajkumari, Mumtaz, Allahrakha.

=== Songlist ===
#	Title	Singer
1	"Main Aansu Lene Aayi Hoon"	Rajkumari
2	"Panchi Ek Ude Kat Jaaye Pankh Dono"	
3	"Main Duniya Ki Rani"	Rajkumari
4	"Pankh Bina Kit Jaaye Pankheroo"	Rajkumari
5	"Pankh Bina Kit Jaaye Pankheroo" II & III	
6	"Piya Hans Kar Bolo Bhi"	Allahrakha, Mumtaz Begum
7	"Sukh Dukh Jeevan Ka Hai Gehna"	Allahrakha
8	"Tohe Kaun Sahara De"	Allahrakha, Mumtaz Begum
