= Raaz (1981 film) =

1981 film by Harmesh Malhotra

- Poster
- Directed by: Harmesh Malhotra
- Written by: Ravi Kapoor
- Based on: Premada Kanike (Kannada)
- Produced by: Virendra Kumar
- Starring: Raj Babbar; Sulakshana Pandit
- Music by: Ravindra Jain
- Release date: 4 September 1981
- Country: India
- Language: Hindi

Raaz (transl. The Secret) is a 1981 Indian Hindi-language thriller film directed by Harmesh Malhotra, starring Raj Babbar and Sulakshana Pandit. It is a remake of the 1976 Kannada film Premada Kanike.

== Plot ==
At the railway station Bhavani Junction, Seema is waiting for her train to start her journey to an estate for the purpose of her employment in the household of Kunwar Chandrapaal Singh as the governess of a little girl. One handicapped man who moves with the help of crutches is also wandering at the station. The train comes and Seema boards it. In her compartment, she finds a strange fellow-passenger Sujeet who tries to make advances to her, but she keeps him at bay. Suddenly another stranger enters with a revolver in his hand and as the train passes through a dark tunnel, shoots Sujeet dead and then sits there himself (in the train compartment) relaxing. Frightened, Seema finds one more revolver lying on the floor of the compartment, but the moment she grabs it, the killer strikes her hand and throws that revolver out of the window of the running train. When the train is about to reach some station, the killer exits and then only does she start shouting for the incident of the murder that has taken place in front of her eyes.

After giving her statement to the police, Seema reaches her employer's house and then she comes face-to-face with a person who is none else than the killer of Sujeet. Now she is in deep trouble. She wants to run away from that house and that place, but can't because her condition is more or less that of a house-arrest. Local cop Khan, who is the investigating officer of Sujeet murder case, wants to take her full statement because he smells that she knows much more than she has told to the police, but now she is under even higher pressure to keep her lips tight because her beloved niece, who has been hitherto staying in the hostel, has been brought to the household of Kunwar Chandrapaal Singh. The handicapped stranger who moves with the help of crutches, is also found roaming about that household. When questioned about it, he terms himself as a novelist and his claim is unreliable because his activities are weird and suspicious. A greedy person, who happens to be the son of the partner of Kunwar's father, is also there in the scenario who keeps on extorting money from him.

Gradually, Seema comes close to Kunwar Chandrapaal Singh and then she becomes aware of his deceased wife and the misdeed and betrayal of Sujeet, who once happened to be a fast friend of Kunwar. One day Khan arrests her under the charge of Sujeet's murder, because of her finger-prints being found on the revolver thrown out of the train (found out by the police later), which coupled with the deductive reasoning applied by Khan, culminates into a conclusion drawn by him that she alone is the murderess. At the time of her arrest, Kunwar is out of station. When he returns, he not only learns of her arrest, but also the fact that she has confessed for Sujeet's murder. What happens thereafter takes the movie to its climax in which the complete suspense of Sujeet's murder is unravelled.

== Cast ==
- Raj Babbar as Kunvar Chandrapal Singh
- Sulakshana Pandit as Seema
- Kader Khan as Inspector Khan
- Sujit Kumar as Sujit
- Bharat Kapoor as Kamal
- Shriram Lagoo as Retd. Major SK Nanda
- T. P. Jain as Khushiram
- Iftekhar as Retd. Inspector Gupta
- Jagdish Raj as Advocate
- Brahm Bhardwaj as Judge
- Sarika as Sunita (Special appearance)
- Helen as Dancer (Special appearance)

== Soundtrack ==
The music was composed and all lyrics penned by Ravindra Jain.

Track listing
No.	Title	Singer(s)	Length
1.	"Tum Hi Mera Pyar Ho"	Lata Mangeshkar
2.	"Tum Jo Hame Itni Pyari"	Sulakshana Pandit, Vijayata Pandit, Rashi Pandit, Suresh Wadkar
3.	"Dilrooba Dilrooba Paas Aa Paas Aa"	Hemlata
