= Kasam Khoon Ki =

- Poster
- Directed by: Ashok Roy
- Written by: Charandas Shokh (dialogues); Verma Malik; Anjaan (lyrics)
- Screenplay by: Tarun Ghosh; Charandas Shokh
- Story by: K.A. Narayan
- Produced by: Prasan Kapoor; Jeetendra (Presents)
- Starring: Jeetendra; Sulakshana Pandit
- Cinematography: K.H. Kapadia
- Edited by: Waman Bhosle; Gurudutt Shirali
- Music by: Kalyanji Anandji
- Production company: Tirupati Pictures
- Release date: 7 September 1977
- Running time: 130 minutes
- Country: India
- Language: Hindi

Kasam Khoon Ki (transl. Sworn on Blood) is a 1977 Hindi-language action drama film directed by Ashok Roy and produced by Prasan Kapoor under the Tirupati Pictures banner. It stars Jeetendra, Sulakshana Pandit and music composed by Kalyanji Anandji.

== Cast ==
- Jeetendra as Kishan
- Sulakshana Pandit as Radha
- Prem Chopra as Prem
- Amjad Khan as Bhajirao
- Om Shivpuri as Seth Dwarkadas
- Madan Puri as Omar Sharif, Sharp Shooter from Dubai
- Shakti Kapoor as Johny, Sharp Shooter from Dubai
- Roopesh Kumar as Sher Singh, Sharp Shooter from Dubai
- Sujit Kumar as Laxman
- Asrani as Gafoore Mistry
- Nirupa Roy as Shanti
- Aruna Irani as Poonam
- Farida Jalal as Ganga
- Sarla Yeolekar
- Jankidas as Dharamdas
- Murad as Minister
- Vikas Anand as Police Inspector Vikas
- Raj Kishore
- Tarun Ghosh as Chandan Guru
- Asit Sen as Ustad, Prisoner in Jail
- M. B. Shetty as Ganja Shetty
- Master Raju as Raju

== Soundtrack ==
#	Title	Singer(s)
1	"O Meri Maina Jaisi Bahena"	Kishore Kumar
2	"O Meri Maina Jaisi Bahena (II)"	Kishore Kumar
3	"Andar Chale Aao Ji Andar"	Kishore Kumar
4	"Jai Janta Bhai Jai Janta"	Kishore Kumar, Mahendra Kapoor
5	"Kyun Dekhte Ho Gair Ko"	Lata Mangeshkar
6	"Main Pital Ki Payaliya"	Lata Mangeshkar
7	"Aaj Loota Do"	Mohammed Rafi, Sulakshana Pandit, Kanchan
