= Apradhi (1974 film) =

1974 film by Jugal Kishore Sharma

- Poster
- Directed by: Jugal Kishore
- Written by: R.K. Banerjee; T.N. Sharma
- Produced by: K.L Chitara
- Starring: Yogeeta Bali; Kiran Kumar; Dev Kumar; Imtiaz
- Cinematography: S.L. Sharma
- Edited by: S.R. Sawant
- Production company: C.S. Productions
- Release date: 1 January 1974
- Running time: 122 minutes
- Country: India
- Language: Hindi

Apradhi (transl. Criminal) is a 1974 Indian Hindi-language action drama film directed by Jugal Kishore, with the script written by R.K. Banerjee and T.N. Sharma. The film stars Yogeeta Bali, Kiran Kumar and Dev Kumar. The soundtrack was composed by Usha Khanna and features playback singers Suman Kalyanpur and Mukesh. It was released on the EMI Records label.

== Plot ==
A delinquent is at large, a masked man in red clothing nicknamed "Redshirt" who leads a gang of bandits. Inspector Shankar (Kiran Kumar) is assigned to investigate the gang. The gang, wise to the police surveillance, kidnap Shankar's daughter Radha (Yogeeta Bali). While in captitivity she is heavily drugged, which leads to her committing suicide. Shankar investigates four suspects, a wholesome holy man named Mahant Badriprasad (Jagdish Raj), retired army Major Vikram Singh, a poet, and a man named Nawab Ashiq Misaaj (Keshto Mukherjee). The gang leader, "Redshirt", is portrayed by Dev Kumar.

== Cast ==
- Yogeeta Bali as Radha / Makhan Singh / Jaswant Kaur / Balwant Kaur
- Kiran Kumar as Inspector Shankar
- Dev Kumar as Masked killer (Redshirt)
- Mumtaz Begum as Radha's mom
- Bhagwan as Motta
- Brahmachari as Havaldar Ghatelal
- Chandrashekhar as Bhagat Singh
- Shashi Chauhan
- Rajan Haksar as Major Vikram Singh
- Imtiaz as Ranjeet
- Jugal Kishore
- Keshto Mukherjee as Nawab Ashiq Misaaj
- Jagdish Raj as Mahant Badriprasad
- Jayshree T. as Shama / Inspector Asha

== Production ==
Apradhi was produced by K.L. Chitkara of C.S. Productions. The script for the film was written by R.K. Banerjee and T.N. Sharma. The cinematography was conducted by S.L. Sharma, and the art director J. S Pophaley was brought in to design the sets. S. Azim and Master Sattar overlooked the action sequences in the film, with special effects added by Dahyabhai Patel. Apradhi was edited by S.R. Sawant.

== Music ==
The soundtrack was composed by Usha Khanna, working with lyricist Hasrat Jaipuri. The playback singers for the film were Suman Kalyanpur and Mukesh. The soundtrack was released on the EMI Records label.

=== Songs ===
The songs featured in the film are as follows:

1. "Hai Re Tum Bhi Jawan" – Mahendra Kapoor, Suman Kalyanpur
2. "Sanwala Rang Naache Har Ang" – Suman Kalyanpur
3. "Jaane Kyu Mujhe Raato Ko" – Suman Kalyanpur
4. "Mai Dhool Ka Udta Badal, Gaata Lehrata Jaa" – Mukesh

== Reception ==
The soundtrack to the film was well-received, with Pankaj Rag identifying "Mai Dhool Ka Udta Badal"' and "Jaane Kyu Mujhe Raato Ko"' as "very good compositions" and noting the Western music influence.
