= Jwala Daku =

- Directed by: R.P. Swamy
- Produced by: Swaran Singh
- Starring: See below
- Release date: 1981
- Country: India
- Language: Hindi

Jwala Daku is a 1981 Bollywood Hindi action film, directed by R.P. Swamy and produced by Swaran Singh. The film was released on 14 April 1981 under the banner of Swarn Films.

== Plot ==
Ravi, a medical student, has come back to his village after the completion of his studies in Bombay. He would like to start a practice there but Ravi discovers that his family is in total chaos. A dreaded dacoit named Jwala Daku is hounding Ravi's brother Bankey in a personal vendetta. Now Ravi has to either face the dacoit or return to Bombay.

== Cast ==
- Ranjeet as Jwala's brother
- Salma Agha as Singer
- Asha Sachdev as Bijli
- Lalita Pawar as Bijli's aunt
- Farida Jalal as Sita
- Mohan Choti as Villager
- Narendra Nath as Mangal
- Urmila Bhatt
- Shashi Puri as Ravi
- Sudhir Dalvi as Rahim
- Sudhir as Bankey
- Raju Shrestha as Raja
- Rehana Sultan as Ramva bai
- Birbal as Pyarelal
- Mahendra Sandhu as Jwala
- Neelam Mehra as Qawali Singer
