= Sankoch =

- Theatrical release poster
- Directed by: Anil Ganguly
- Written by: M. G. Hashmat (dialogues)
- Screenplay by: Surendra Shailaj
- Story by: Sarat Chandra Chattopadhyay
- Produced by: R. K. Soral
- Starring: Jeetendra; Sulakshana Pandit
- Cinematography: Aloke Das Gupta
- Edited by: Waman Bhonsle; Gurudutt Shirali
- Music by: Kalyanji–Anandji
- Production company: Suyog Films
- Release date: 1976
- Running time: 130 mins
- Country: India
- Language: Hindi

Sankoch (transl. Hesitation) is a 1976 Indian Hindi-language drama film, produced by R. K. Soral under the Suyog Films banner. It was directed by Anil Ganguly. A remake of Bengali film Parineeta (1969), it stars Jeetendra, Sulakshana Pandit and music composed by Kalyanji–Anandji. The movie is based on the novel Parineeta by Sarat Chandra Chattopadhyay.

== Plot ==
Navin Babu and Gurcharan, are neighbours. Lalita, Gurcharan's niece and Shekar, Navin Babu's son, are childhood friends. When they are grown up, having realized their love for each other they exchange garlands and take wedding vows in secret.

The middle-class Gurcharan owes money to the rich Navin Babu. when he is unable to repay his debt, Navin Babu puts up their house for auction. Shekar is away in the city at this time. Girish, the brother of Lalita's friend Aruna, helps them keep the house. Lalita is grateful to Girish. Shekar mistakes it for intimacy and becomes jealous.

Gurcharan asks Girish to marry Lalita who is caught in a conflict. While she considers herself married to Shekhar she does not want to hurt her uncle. Shekar receives Girish & Lalita's wedding invite and decides to get engaged to the girl his father has selected. The rest of the story is about destiny's role in uniting the secretly married lovers Lalita and Shekar.

== Cast ==
- Jeetendra as Shekhar
- Sulakshana Pandit as Lalita
- Vikram Makandar as Girish
- A.K. Hangal as Guru Charan
- Om Shivpuri as Naveen Babu
- I. S. Johar as Sangeet Samrat
- Ramesh Deo as Avinash
- Jankidas as Vidyavathi's father
- Keshto Mukherjee as Dhakkan
- Urmila Bhatt as Gurucharan's wife
- Aruna Irani as Sangeet Samrat's wife
- Seema Deo as Avinash's wife
- Dulari as Naveen Babu's wife
- Preeti Ganguly as Vidyavathi
- Lalitha Kumari as Vidyavathi's mother

== Soundtrack ==
#	Title	Singer(s)	Time
1	"Chanchal Man Teri"	Kishore Kumar	4:14
2	"Baandhi Re Kaahe Prit"	Sulakshana Pandit	3:14
3	"Pyare Pyare Ghunghat Me"	Asha Bhosle	3:15
4	"Kaun Raha Hai Kaun"	Kishore Kumar	2:03
5	"Baandhi Re Kaahe Prit-2"	Sulakshana Pandit	3:48
6	"Saat Suron Ki Sargam"	Kishore Kumar, Asha Bhosle, Keshto Mukherjee	
