= Khandaan (1979 film) =

- Theatrical release poster
- Directed by: Anil Ganguly
- Written by: Omar Khayyam Saharanpuri (dialogues); Naqsh Lyallpuri (lyrics)
- Screenplay by: Nubendu Ghosh
- Story by: Omar Khayyam Saharanpuri
- Produced by: Sibte Hassan Rizvi
- Starring: Jeetendra; Sulakshana Pandit; Rakesh Roshan; Bindiya Goswami
- Cinematography: Dilip Rajan Mukerjee
- Edited by: Waman Bhonsle; Gurudutt Shirale
- Music by: Khayyam
- Production company: New World Enterprises
- Release date: 18 July 1979
- Running time: 130 minutes
- Country: India
- Language: Hindi

Khandaan (transl. Clan) is a 1979 Indian Hindi-language drama film, produced by Sibte Hassan Rizvi under the New World Enterprises banner and directed by Anil Ganguly. It stars Jeetendra, Sulakshana Pandit, Rakesh Roshan and Bindiya Goswami and the music was composed by Khayyam. It was a remake of the 1952 Bombay Talkies film Maa which was directed by Bimal Roy, in which Leela Chitnis played the eponymous role of the mother/Maa. Khandaan was remade in Telugu as Jeevitha Ratnam (1981).

== Plot ==
Gauri Shankar who works as a clerk lives with his wife, Savitri, and sons, Vikas and Ravi. Vikas marries Nanda. The playful Ravi falls for Usha. Vikas gets a job and must deposit a large amount of money as security. Gauri Shankar tries to collect the money but fails. Desperate, he steals money from his office but is caught. Ravi decides to incriminate himself to keep his father out of jail and is sentenced. Gauri Shankar passes away after divulging the truth to Savitri who keeps this a secret. Vikas leaves his mother alone after getting the job. Ravi returns home after serving his sentence. Vikas manipulates him to go away from their lives. When Ravi gets to know that Usha is about to be married off he moves to the city, where he meets Sandhya, the daughter of Seth Dharamdas. Dharamdas gives him a job. Ravi gains his boss's trust and Sandhya falls in love with him but he gently turns her down. It turns out that Usha did not get married as she loved Ravi and wanted to wait for him. Through Usha, Ravi gets to know the extent of his brother's betrayal. Witnessing his mother's pitiful state, Ravi confronts his brother but Savitri stops him. Vikas and Nanda become remorseful and apologize for their behavior. The movie ends on a happy note with the marriage of Ravi and Usha.

== Cast ==
- Jeetendra as Ravi Srivastav
- Sulakshana Pandit as Usha
- Rakesh Roshan as Rakesh Dinanath
- Bindiya Goswami as Sandhya
- Nirupa Roy as Savitri Srivastav
- Bindu as Nanda
- Sujit Kumar as Vikas Srivastav
- A. K. Hangal as Masterji
- Dina Phatak as Usha's mother
- Paidi Jairaj as Gaurishankar Srivastav
- Pinchoo Kapoor as Seth Dharamdas, Sandhya's father
- Raj Kishore as Sandhya's brother

== Soundtrack ==
Music composed by Khayyam with lyrics by Naqsh Lyallpuri. The song "Mana teri nazar nein" was recorded for this movie, but was filmed in a later film Ahista Ahista, with music by Khayyam

#	Title	Singer(s)	Duration
1	"Ye Mulaqat Ek Bahana Hai"	Lata Mangeshkar	3:45
2	"Matlab Ke Hain"	Nitin Mukesh	3:25
3	"Yaro Aao Khushi"	Kishore Kumar	4:50
4	"Basti Ke Logon Mein"	Kishore Kumar	6:30
5	"Mana Teri Nazar Mein"	Sulakshana Pandit	5:20
6	"Main Na Bataungi"	Sulakshana Pandit	4:00
