= Sankalp (given name) =

Sankalp is a given name. Notable people with the given name include:

- Sankalp Amonkar (born 1975), Indian politician and businessman
- Sankalp Gupta (born 2003), Indian chess grandmaster
- Sankalp Reddy (born 1984), Indian film director and screenwriter
- Sankalp Vohra (born 1983), Indian cricketer

== See also ==
- Sankalp, 1975 Bollywood drama film
- Sankalp, Hindi TV series 2026
- Operation Sankalp
- ICGS Sankalp
- Sankalp India Foundation
