= Aap Ke Saath =

1986 film by J. Om Prakash

- Directed by: J. Om Prakash
- Written by: Sachin Bhawmik
- Produced by: J. Om Prakash
- Starring: Anil Kapoor; Vinod Mehra; Smita Patil; Rati Agnihotri; Amrish Puri
- Music by: Laxmikant Pyarelal
- Release date: 4 March 1986 (India)
- Running time: 133 minutes
- Country: India
- Language: Hindi

Aap Ke Saath is a 1986 Hindi-language film produced and directed by J. Om Prakash, starring Anil Kapoor, Vinod Mehra, Smita Patil, Rati Agnihotri, Utpal Dutt, and Amrish Puri.

== Plot ==
Ashok and Vimal are two grandsons of K.K. Sahib. Ashok and Ganga are in love, but when Ashok is about to propose marriage, he finds out that Ganga has lodged a police complaint against him for sexual molestation. Ashok pays Ganga some money and hopes to never see her again. K. K. Sahib brings home a girl named Deepa and wants Ashok to marry her. But Deepa falls in love with Vimal. Vimal frequently visits a courtesan. When Ashok finds out that the courtesan is none other than Ganga what happens?

== Cast ==
- Anil Kapoor as Vimal
- Vinod Mehra as Ashok
- Smita Patil as Ganga
- Rati Agnihotri as Deepa/Salma
- Utpal Dutt as K. K. Sahib
- Aruna Irani as Kamla
- Amrish Puri as Persha
- Pinchoo Kapoor as Kishorilal Malhotra
- Gajanan Jagirdar as Parsaji
- Shivraj as Ojha
- Raj Mehra as Doctor
- Sunder as Pareshan Singh
- Yunus Parvez as Mr Dhingra, General Manager
- Pradeep Rawat as Rajwa (uncredited)

== Soundtrack ==
Mohammed Aziz dubbed Shabbir Kumar 's song "Bahke Bahke Ye Jazbaat" & Lata Mangeshkar dubbed Anuradha Paudwal's song "Jind Le Gaya".

All lyrics are written by Anand Bakshi; all music is composed by Laxmikant–Pyarelal

No.	Title	Singer(s)	Length
1.	"Jind Le Gaya"	Anuradha Paudwal (Audio Track)
2.	"Mera Naam Salma"	Salma Agha
3.	"Behke Behke Yeh Jazbaat; Aap Ke Saath"	Mohammed Aziz, Anuradha Paudwal
4.	"Aane Wale Saal Ko Salaam"	Shabbir Kumar
5.	"Chand Chupta Hai"	Shabbir Kumar
6.	"Jind Le Gaya"	Lata Mangeshkar (Film Track)
