= Phool Khile Hain Gulshan Gulshan (film) =

- Directed by: Sikandar Khanna
- Written by: Rajendra Krishan (Dialogue)
- Story by: Kaushal Bharti
- Produced by: Surinder Kapoor
- Starring: Ashok Kumar; Rishi Kapoor; Moushumi Chatterjee
- Cinematography: D. S. Pathak; Sharad Kadve
- Edited by: Kamalakar
- Music by: Laxmikant-Pyarelal
- Release date: 28 July 1978
- Country: India
- Language: Hindi

Phool Khile Hain Gulshan Gulshan (transl. Flowers have bloomed everywhere) is a 1978 Indian Hindi-language film produced by Surinder Kapoor and directed by Sikandar Khanna. The film stars Ashok Kumar, Rishi Kapoor, Moushumi Chatterjee, Mithun Chakraborty, Asrani, Paintal, Ranjeet, Amjad Khan and Helen. The soundtrack is directed by Laxmikant-Pyarelal.

== Cast ==
- Ashok Kumar as Lala Ganpat Rai
- Shreeram Lagoo as Laxmi Narayan
- Rishi Kapoor as Vishal Rai
- Moushumi Chatterjee as Shanti
- Mithun Chakraborty as Vishal's Friend
- Asrani as Vishal's Friend
- Paintal as Vishal's Friend
- Ranjeet as Bhiku Prasad
- Amjad Khan as Kalandar
- Helen
- Mala Jaggi as Vishal's friend Ruhi

== Soundtrack ==
All songs were penned by Rajendra Krishan

Song	Singer
"Duniya Mein Sab Se Haseen"	Kishore Kumar
"Mannubhai Motor Chali"	Kishore Kumar
"Kaisa Parda Hai"	Kishore Kumar
"Pyar Pardon Mein"	Bhupinder Singh
"Sab Khil Gaye Gaalon Pe"	Lata Mangeshkar
"Jo Insan Jitna Hi Pasina Bahaye, Woh Utna Mati Se Sona Ugaye"	Asha Bhosle, Mohammed Rafi, Manna Dey
