= Kala Suraj =

- Directed by: Desh Gautam
- Starring: Shatrughan Sinha; Sulakshana Pandit; Rakesh Roshan; Aruna Irani
- Music by: Bappi Lahiri
- Release date: 1985

Kala Suraj is a 1985 Hindi action film starring Shatrughan Sinha, Sulakshana Pandit, and Rakesh Roshan. The film is best known for its song "do ghoot pila de" which is still popular among new generation. It is based on a novel written by Damodar Khadse.

== Cast ==
- Shatrughan Sinha as Karan
- Sulakshana Pandit as Karuna
- Rakesh Roshan as Police Officer Pratap Singh
- Aruna Irani
- Amjad Khan

== Soundtrack ==
The music of the film was composed by Bappi Lahiri and the lyrics were penned by Kulwant Jani.

1. "Aap Kya Aaye Lo Bahaar Aa Gayee" – Sharon Prabhakar
2. "Ang Ang Mera Gaane Laga" – Asha Bhosle
3. "Apni Baahon Ka Haar De" – Sulakshana Pandit, K. J. Yesudas
4. "Do Ghoont Pila De Saqi" – Narendra Chanchal
5. "Peenewale Tujhe" – Shankar-Shambhu (composed by Shankar-Shambhu)
6. "Pinjrewali Munia" Manna Dey (composed by Shankar–Jaikishan and penned by Shailendra)
