= Shola Aur Shabnam (1961 film) =

- Directed by: Ramesh Saigal
- Written by: Ramesh Saigal
- Starring: Dharmendra; Tarla Mehta; Abhi Bhattacharya; Vijayalakshmi; M. Rajan
- Cinematography: Krishan Saigal
- Edited by: Madhu Naik; Umakant Naik
- Music by: Khayyam
- Release date: 1961
- Running time: 135 minutes
- Country: India
- Language: Hindi

Shola Aur Shabnam (English: Fire and Dew) is a 1961 Indian Hindi-language romance film written and directed by Ramesh Saigal. It stars Dharmendra, Tarla Mehta, Abhi Bhattacharya, Vijayalakshmi and M. Rajan in pivotal roles. It was one of the very early films of Dharmendra. The film is about a young man torn between love for his long lost childhood sweetheart, and devotion towards a friend who has helped set him up in his career. The film features music by Khayyam.

== Plot ==
Ravi or "Bunnu" as he's called at home and Sandhya (Chandrakala) are childhood sweethearts despite Ravi being poor, and Sandhya being rich. Sandhya's father, who is a senior official in the Railways is posted to a distant location; Ravi and Sandhya are separated and out of contact.

Many years later, Ravi has matured into a strapping young man. Not being rich or influential, Ravi finds it hard to find a job and decides to approach his friend Prakash (played by M. Rajan). Prakash is a happy-go-luck rich kid, whose family runs a large timber factory amid lush jungles, and is only too happy to hire Ravi at a generous salary (Rs.300 per month, although Ravi asks for only Rs.100).

Prakash's elder brother is Aakash, played by the veteran character actor Abhi Bhattacharya. Aakash is a bachelor, his devious father having caused the suicide of his paramour, a poor village girl. Aakash is often drunk, pining for his lost love, but loves his younger brother dearly and generally spoils him.

Prakash is smitten with and soon to be engaged to his father's friend's daughter Sandhya (Tarla Mehta), who arrives at their jungle home. This is the same Sandhya who had betrothed herself to Ravi in her childhood. Ravi does not recognize her at first, but the moment of truth comes when Prakash asks Ravi to sing a song. This was the same song that Ravi and Sandhya sang in childhood, and they both realize it, though neither reveals this secret.

Ravi is still in love with the girl he was separated from in childhood, but does not wish to come in the way of his friend Praskash's happiness. Sandhya also loves Ravi, and wants to marry him instead of Prakash. Till the climax of the movie, Prakash remains oblivious of the special relationship that Ravi and Sandhya have. Ravi's feelings for Sandhya are sensed by Aakash, who has lost in love himself. Aakash is now faced with a choice: either ignore Ravi and Sandhya's true love and proceed with the union of Sandhya and Prakash, or break his brother's Prakash's heart and side with Ravi and Sandhya.

Oblivious of Ravi's feelings for Sandhya, Prakash keeps asking him to entice Sandhya towards him. Ravi smilingly soldiers on, trying to find his own happiness in his friend's. Until, Sandhya threatens to reveal all to Prakash, and break off their engagement. Faced with this catastrophe, Ravi decides to leave his job with Prakash, and return to his village, but Aakash steps in and persuades him not to leave. Aakash has finally decided to defend the childhood love, against the will of his father.

The seemingly complex love triangle reaches a climax, with the childhood sweethearts being united, but at the cost of Aakash losing his life in the same manner as his beloved did.

== Cast ==
- Dharmendra as Ravi (Bunnu)
- Tarla Mehta as Sandhya
- M. Rajan as Prakash
- Abhi Bhattacharya as Akash
- Vijayalaxmi as Tripti
- Mubarak as Akash's Father
- Dhumal as Munshiji
- Jeevan Kala
- Ruby Mayer as Akash's Mother (as Sulochana)
- Leela Mishra as Bunnu's Mother (as Leela Misra)
- Johnny Whisky
- N.V. Morajkar
- Belchar Pereira
- V.N. Shukla
- Chandrakala as Young Sandhya
- Akashdeep as Young Bunnu

== Soundtrack ==
The songs were composed by Khayyam and lyrics penned by Kaifi Azmi. It features vocals by many renowned singers including Mohammed Rafi.

The track "Jane Kya Dhoondti Rahti" is highly regarded as one of the best works in the whole career of Khayyam. Rafi won several appreciations for the rendition of this particular song. Several critics and stalwarts have picked this songs as Rafi's best. The list includes Khayyam, the composer and Dharmendra, who performed the song onscreen.

#	Title	Singer(s)	Length
1	"Jeet Hi Lenge Baazi"	Mohammed Rafi, Lata Mangeshkar	3:36
2	"Phir Wohi Sawan Aaya"	Jagjit Kaur	3:15
3	"Jane Kya Dhoondti Rahti"	Mohammed Rafi	3:35
4	"Pehle To Ankh Milana"	Mohammed Rafi, Jagjit Kaur	3:11
5	"Ladi Re Ladi Tujhse Aankh Jo Ladi"	Jagjit Kaur	3:01

Two songs are set in Hindustani ragas: "Jeet Hi Lenge Baazi" (Bhairavi) and "Jane Kya Dhoondti Rahti" (Pahadi).
