= Aaj Kie Aurat =

- Poster
- Directed by: Avtar Bhogal
- Written by: Iqbal Durrani(dialogues)
- Screenplay by: Sanjoy Chowdhury; Joginder Shelly
- Story by: Suresh Kumar Sharma; Avtar Bhogal(idea)
- Produced by: Avtar Bhogal
- Starring: Jeetendra; Dimple Kapadia
- Cinematography: Anil Sehgal
- Edited by: Rajeev Gupta
- Music by: Bappi Lahiri
- Production company: ABC International
- Release date: 11 March 1993
- Running time: 152 minutes
- Country: India
- Language: Hindi

Aaj Kie Aurat (transl. Today's Woman) is a 1993 Hindi-language social problem film, produced & directed by Avtar Bhogal on ABC International banner. Starring Jeetendra, Dimple Kapadia and music composed by Bappi Lahari.

== Plot ==
Roshni, a middle-class woman in Bombay, lives with her widowed mother and younger sister, Anju. Inspired by her late father, a Police Inspector, Roshni joins the police force, undergoes training, and is appointed to the Santa Cruz Police Station. She garners sufficient evidence to arrest Dheeraj Kumar, the son of Home Minister Anna Patil. However, the court acquits Dheeraj, forcing Roshni to resign. Tragically, Dheeraj and his gang then rape Anju, leaving her in a coma. When the police refuse to act, Roshni confronts Anna Patil and Dheeraj, becoming a fugitive accused of murdering two of Patil’s associates. Roshni is eventually arrested, imprisoned, and tortured. Her mother’s efforts to locate her prove futile. Roshni struggles to find a lawyer willing to take her case until Avinash Kapoor, an unemployed lawyer, agrees to defend her. After meeting Roshni in prison and hearing her story, Avinash assures her of her release. During the trial, Roshni testifies, but Avinash betrays her, discredits her evidence, and has her committed to a mental institution. The narrative explores the profound impact of these events on Roshni and her mother.

== Cast ==
- Jeetendra as Advocate Avinash Kapoor
- Dimple Kapadia as Inspector Roshni Verma/Rajni
- Sujata Mehta as Sunita Menon
- Anupam Kher as Editor Arun Saxena
- Sadashiv Amrapurkar as Home Minister Anna Patil
- Goga Kapoor as Advocate Satya Prakash
- Deep Dhillon as Mangal Singh / Daku Bhairav Singh
- Shashi Puri as Doctor Pankaj Sheth
- Ram Mohan as Head of Inquiry Commission
- Anand Balraj as Dheeraj Patil
- Santosh Gupta as Munna
- Pramod Moutho as Builder Shyam Kumar Gupta
- Reema Lagoo as Jail Warden Shanta Patel
- Avtar Gill as Inspector Krishnan Shetty
- Suhas Joshi as Mrs. Verma
- Dimpy Ganguly as Anju Verma

== Soundtrack ==
#	Title	Singer(s)
1	"Sacchai Ka Humko Mila"	Arpita Raj
2	"Pehle Tum Phir Aap"	Kumar Sanu; Chandrani Mukherjee
3	"Gori Tera Nazara Kar Karke"	Mohammed Aziz; Reeema Dasgupta
4	"Hello Hello Inspector"	Kavita Krishnamurthy
5	"Ek Din Aayegi Subah"	Kumar Sanu
6	"Ek Din Aayegi Subah"	Chandrani Mukherjee
