= Aakhri Chetawani =

- Directed by: Deva Dutta
- Screenplay by: Lalan Kumar Kanj
- Produced by: Deva Dutta
- Starring: Sudha Chandran; Bharat Bhushan; Kader Khan; Shakti Kapoor
- Music by: Shrikant Niwaskar
- Production company: Shiv Sai Films
- Release date: 10 December 1993
- Country: India
- Language: Hindi

Aakhri Chetawani (The Last Warning) is a 1993 Hindi action drama film of Bollywood directed and produced by Deva Dutta. This multi-starrer film was released on 10 December 1993 under the banner of Shiv Sai Films.

== Cast ==
- Bharat Bhushan
- Sudha Chandran
- Raza Murad
- Kader Khan
- Shakti Kapoor
- Vijay Saxena
- Amita Nangia
- Sudhir Dalvi
- Joginder
- Usha Timothy
- Mahesh Raj
- Shrikant Niwaskar
- Paramveer
- Ankush Mohit

== Soundtrack ==
Track listing
No.	Title	Singer(s)	Length
1.	"Teri Mohabbat Ne Mujhko"	Kumar Sanu, Usha Timothy	6:16
2.	"Maine Dil Se Tujhko Pyar Kiya"	Shobha Joshi	5:32
3.	"Tum Takum Tum Takum"	Kumar Sanu, Mohammed Aziz, Anupama Deshpande	6:34
4.	"Aaire Aaire Mujhpe Jawani Aai"	Kavita Krishnamurthy	6:07
5.	"Dudhia Jisma Gulabi Gaal"	Kumar Sanu, Anupama Deshpande	7:15
6.	"Wada Ye Karna (Male Version)"	Udit Narayan	0:34
7.	"Wada Ye Karna (Female Version)"	Shobha Joshi	0:38
