= Moolchand =

Indian actor

Moolchand Kapoor was a prolific character actor in Hindi and Punjabi cinema, who was active from 1950 to his death in the late 1980s. He appeared in over 250 films. These films spanned the parallel cinema of Guru Dutt to the wrestler films of Dara Singh. He is known for his big stomach.

The first known appearance of Moolchand is in 1950. He was often featured in the films of the directors Guru Dutt and Raj Kapoor, working on 6 of the former and 8 of the latter. Other actors he was often seen with were Dev Anand, B. R. Chopra, Dara Singh and I. S. Johar, who featured him in most of their movies.

Most of Moolchand's early roles were small ones. He only began to get significant roles in the 1960s. Padosan (1968), where he plays the servant of Om Prakash's character featured a lot of close-ups of Moolchand and showed him to be an able comedic side actor. This comedic side would be further explored in the 1970s with a scene stealing appearance in Yaadon Ki Baarat, with fellow fat man Ram Avtar as a tortured businessman and in Don, as the village medicine man who dances with Amitabh and beckons Zeenat Aman to participate.

Little is known about Moolchand outside of his film work. The 1988 release Tamacha credits him as "Late Moolchand".

== Movies ==
- Khandaan (1942) as riding bicycles behind Noor Jehen's car
- Fighting Hero (1946)
- Kismatwali (1947)
- Apna Desh(1949)
- Rights And Responsibilities (Unknowns year) longest role of he's career short movie For Film Division India
- Shri Ganesh Mahima (1950)
- Teen Batti Char Raasta (1953)
- Naata (1955)
- Railway Platform (1955) as an uncredited
- Pyaasa (1957) as a restaurant owner
- Naya Daur (1957)
- Chhoti Bahen (1959)
- Chambe Di Kali (1960) Punjabi movie
- Mama Ji (1964) Punjabi Movie
- Jagga (1963) Punjabi Movie in Daku Gangs
- Dil Ne Pukara as (1967) Joyti's Dad
- Nanak Dukhiya Sub Sansar (1970) as Bhola Ram
- Amar Prem (1972) as Pan Shop Owner
- Yaadon Ki Baraat (1973)
- Loafer (1973) as constable Lalchand
- Dukh Bhanjan Tera Naam (1974) (Punjabi film)
- Patthar Aur Payal (1974) as Casino Card player/customer
- Ponga Pandit (1975)
- Pratigya
- Do Jasoos (1975) as Dancer in New Year party
- Salaakhen (1975)
- Phool aur Insaan (1976)
- Hera Pheri (1976)
- Chacha Bhatija (1977) as Grocery and Ration Shop Owner
- Amar Akbar Anthony (1977) as Pedro
- Parvarish (1977)
- Trishul (1978) as Creditor
- Don (1978 film) as Govinda
- Premi Gangaram as Chaat Ram
- Nalayak (1978) as Customer in Casino
- Gol Maal (1979) as Spectator in Cinema Hall
- Mr. Natwarlal (1979) as Seth Dharamdas
- Suhaag (1979)
- Nai Imarat (1981) as Lala
- Zakhmee Insaan (1982) as Sath Kaddu Singh Halwaai sweet shop owner
- Satte Pe Satta (1982) as Lala, Grocery Shop Owner
- Khud-Daar (1982) as Small time smuggler
- Maati Maangey Khoon (1984) as Jeweller
- Adhikar (1986)
- Zindagani (1986) as Roadside Dhaba Owner
- Goraa (1987) as Seth Amirchand
- Sadak Chhap (1987) as jeweller
- Ek Naya Rishta (1988)
- Zakhmi Aurat (1988)
- Mar Mitenge (1988) as Jeweller
- Hum Intezaar Karenge (1989) as Sethji
- Toofan (1989) as Seth Dharamdas
- Yaar Meri Zindagi (2008) as Takedar (The movie was released after his death)
