= Zinda Dil =

- Directed by: Sikandar Khanna
- Produced by: K. L. Bhatia; K. Shorey
- Starring: Rishi Kapoor; Neetu Singh
- Cinematography: Sudarshan Nag & S.N.Dubey
- Music by: Laxmikant–Pyarelal
- Release date: 15 October 1975
- Country: India
- Language: Hindi

Zinda Dil is a 1975 Bollywood film directed by Sikandar Khanna. The film stars Rishi Kapoor, Rajesh Leher and Neetu Singh in the lead roles. The film was based on East of Eden, a 1955 American period drama film directed by Elia Kazan.

== Plot summary ==
This is the story of two brothers and a father. The brothers are twins Arun Sharma (played by Rishi Kapoor) and Kewal Sharma (Actor Rajesh Leher, look-alike of Rishi Kapoor, who also played lead role in the film Subh Din of Rajshri Productions), and the father is Major Hemraj Sharma (Pran), a war veteran who became disabled in the last war, and has to rely on crutches to walk. The Major has a soft corner for Kewal, but shows open disapproval of Arun, thus alienating him. He constantly asks Arun to make sacrifices for Kewal, including giving up his love, Rekha (Zaheera). Heartbroken Arun leaves his father's home and meets an old acquaintance who he had saved from committing suicide, Jyoti (Neetu Singh). Jyoti gets Arun a job at her dad's (Pinchoo Kapoor) Diwan Pratap chand's hotel. Here Arun meets with a hotel waiter who tells him that his mother is still alive. Arun is shocked to note this and asks his mother to accompany him to confront his father. Was Arun's father really that cold-hearted to let go of his wife, and keep this secret from his sons?

== Songs ==
1. "O Meri Jan By God Mai Teri Life Banadunga" - Kishore Kumar
2. "Nahi Nahi Jana Nahi Abhi Nahi" - Lata Mangeshkar
3. "Zindagi Jindadili Ka Nam Hai" - Mohammed Rafi
4. "Sham Suhani Ayi Khusiya Banke Pahli Bar" - Mahendra Kapoor, Shailendra Singh, Lata Mangeshkar

== Cast ==
- Rishi Kapoor as Arun Sharma
- Rajesh Leher as Kewal Sharma
- Neetu Singh as Jyoti Pratap Chand
- Zaheera as Rekha
- Pran as Major Hemraj Sharma
- Raj Mehra as Rekha's dad
- I. S. Johar as Pinto D'souza / Daya Shankar
- Roopesh Kumar as Ghanshyam Thakur
- Pinchoo Kapoor as Diwan Pratap Chand
- Padma Chavan as Parvati
