= Sulakshana Pandit =

Indian playback singer and actress (1954–2025)

Background information
- Also known as: Sulakshna
- Born: 12 July 1954; Raigarh, Madhya Pradesh, India (present—day Chhattisgarh, India)
- Died: 6 November 2025 (aged 71) Mumbai, Maharashtra, India
- Genres: Playback singing
- Occupations: Singer; actress
- Years active: 1967–1996

Sulakshana Pandit (12 July 1954 – 6 November 2025) was an Indian playback singer and film actress who worked primarily in Hindi cinema during the 1970s and 1980s. She belonged to the Mewati Gharana, a prominent school of Indian classical music. Pandit was the elder sister of music director duo Jatin–Lalit and former actress Vijayta Pandit.

== Career ==
Sulakshana's career as an actress spanned the 1970s and early 1980s. As a leading lady she worked with most of the top actors of the 1970s like Jeetendra, Sanjeev Kumar, Rajesh Khanna, Vinod Khanna, Shashi Kapoor and Shatrughan Sinha. Her acting career began with the suspense thriller Uljhan in 1975, opposite Sanjeev Kumar. In Anil Ganguly's Sankoch (1976), which was based on the novel Parineeta, she portrayed Lolita. Her other popular films include Hera Pheri, Apnapan, Khandaan, Chehre Pe Chehra, Dharam Kanta and Waqt Ki Deewar.

She acted in a Bengali movie Bandie 1978, where she was paired opposite Uttam Kumar.

Sulakshana had a singing career alongside her acting one. She began her singing career as a child singer singing the popular song "Saat Samundar Paar se" with Lata Mangeshkar in the 1967 film Taqdeer. Thereafter, she recorded with famed musicians such as Kishore Kumar and Hemant Kumar. She sang in Hindi, Bengali, Marathi, Oriya and Gujarati. In 1980, she released an album titled Jazbaat (HMV), wherein she rendered ghazals. She sang duets with accomplished singers such as Kishore Kumar, Lata Mangeshkar, Mohammed Rafi, Shailender Singh, Yesudas, Mahendra Kapoor and Udit Narayan. She sang under music directors such as Shankar Jaikishan, Laxmikant Pyarelal, Kalyanji Anandji, Kanu Roy, Bappi Lahiri, Usha Khanna, Rajesh Roshan, Khayyam, Rajkamal and several others. In 1986, Sulakshana was one of the singers to perform at the Royal Albert Hall in London to celebrate the "Festival of Indian Music" Concert along with acclaimed Music Directors Laxmikant Pyarelal and singers Manhar, Shabbir Kumar, Nitin Mukesh and Anuradha Paudwal.

Her voice was last heard in an alaap in the song "Saagar Kinare Bhi Do Dil" from the movie Khamoshi the musical (1996), which was composed by her brothers Jatin and Lalit.

== Personal life and death ==
Sulakshana came from a musical family originating from Pilimandori Village in Hissar (now Fatehabad) district of Haryana state. The famous classical vocalist and legendary Pandit Jasraj was her uncle. Ex Rajgarh MP & Jan Sangh leader Vasant Kumar Pandit was also her uncle. She started singing at the age of nine. Her elder brother Mandheer Pandit (who was earlier a music composer in the 1980s with Jatin Pandit as the duo Mandheer–Jatin) was her constant companion in Mumbai; they performed and sang on stage until Sulakshana became a leading playback singer through many of their live concerts with legends such as Kishore Kumar and Mohammed Rafi.

She had three brothers (Mandheer, Jatin and Lalit Pandit) and three sisters (Maya Anderson, Sandhya Singh and Vijayta Pandit). Her father Pratap Narain Pandit was an accomplished classical vocalist. Pandit's nephew, Yash Pandit, is an Indian television actor. Nieces Shraddha Pandit and Shweta Pandit are playback singers. Her cousin is playback singer Hemlata.

Pandit never married, after actor Sanjeev Kumar turned down her marriage proposal. She fell on hard times after she stopped getting work. Her sister Vijayta Pandit and brother-in-law, music composer Aadesh Shrivastava, had plans to compose a devotional album for her, but Aadesh died before he could. She broke her hip bone when she fell in the bathroom. Pandit made rare public appearances after her four surgeries that left her impaired. She gave a full length radio interview wherein she spoke about her acting and singing career to RJ Vijay Akela in July 2017.

Pandit died of cardiac arrest on 6 November 2025, at the age of 71.

== Discography ==
Year	Movie	Song	Co-singer(s)
1971	Door Ka Raahi	"Beqarar-e-dil Tu Gaaye Ja"	Kishore Kumar
1975	Chalte Chalte	"Sapnon Ka Raja Koi"	Shailender Singh
1975	Chalte Chalte	"Jaana Kahan Hai"	Bappi Lahiri
1975	Uljhan	"Aaj Pyare Pyare Se Lagte"	Kishore Kumar
1975	Sankalp	"Tu Hi Saagar Hai Tu Hi Kinara"	
1975	Salaakhen	"Chal Chal Kahin Akele Mein"	Hemlata
1975	Shankar Shambhu	"Aa Pahunchi Hai, Aa Pahunchi Hai Is Mele Mein Saddi Aaj Sawaari"	Kishore Kumar, Mahendra Kapoor,
1976	Sankoch	"Bandhi Re Kahe Preet"	
1977	Apnapan	"Somwar Ko Hum Mile"	Kishore Kumar
1977	Kasam Khoon Ki	"Aaj Loota Do"	Mohammed Rafi, Kanchan
1977	Thief of Baghdad	Teri Khataon Ki Kya Doon Saza	Asha Bhosle
1978	Ek Baap Chhe Bete	"Ghadi Milan Ki Aayee Aayee Tu Chutti Lekar"	Mohammed Rafi
1978	Phaansi	"Jab Aati Hogi Yaad Meri"	Mohammed Rafi
1978	Phaansi	"Mil Jaate Hain Milnewaale"	
1978	Bandie	"Ogo Sathi Go Swapno" (Bengali), "Jise Yaar Ka Sachcha Pyaar Mile" (Hindi)	Shyamal Mitra (Bengali), Kishore Kumar (Hindi)
1978	Dil Se Mile Dil	Hathon Mein Mere Bhi Mehndi	Vijayta Pandit
1978	Toote Khilone	Kya jaane ye Duniya	Amit Kumar
1978	Amar Shakti	"Mohabbat Mein Nigahon Se"	Mohammed Rafi
1979	Griha Pravesh	"Boliye Surili Boliyaan"	
1979	Sawan Ko Aane Do	"Kajare Ki Baati"	Yesudas
1979	Garam Khoon	"Pardesiya Tere Des Mein"	Mohammed Rafi
1979	Khandaan	"Main Na Bataungi"	
1979	Khandaan	"Mana Teri Nazar Mein"	
1980	Ek Baar Kaho	Ek Baar Khao Mujhe Par	Bappi Lahiri
1980	Thodisi Bewafaii	"Mausam Mausam Lovely Mausam"	Anwar Hussain
1980	Thodisi Bewafaii	"Suno Na Bhabhi"	Jagjit Kaur
1980	Sparsh	"Khaali Pyala Dhundhla Darpan"	
1980	Sparsh	"Geeton Ki Duniya Men Sargam"	
1980	Sparsh	"Pyala Chhalka Ujla Darpan"	
1981	Ahistaa Ahistaa	"Mana Teri Nazar"	
1981	Saajan Ki Saheli	"Jiske Liye Sab Ko Chhoda"	Mohammed Rafi
1981	Chehre Pe Chehra	Tumse Kehna Hai Ki Dushwar	
1981	Raaz	Tum Jo Hame Itni Pyari"	Vijayata Pandit, Rashi Pandit, Suresh Wadkar
1982	Dil Hi Dil Mein	Bheegi Bheegi Waadi Mein	Mohammed Rafi
1985	Kaala Sooraj	Apni Baahon Ka Haar De	K. J. Yesudas
1986	Hasrat	"Meri Hasrat Hai"	Mohammad Aziz
1987	Goraa	De Ragrha Ho Tagrha	Mohammad Aziz
1996	Khamoshi: The Musical	"Saagar Kinare Bhi Do Dil Hain Pyaase"	Udit Narayan, Jatin Pandit

== Filmography ==
Year	Film	Character/Role	Costar
1975	Uljhan	Karuna	Sanjeev Kumar
1975	Sankalp	Poojaran	
1975	Raaja	Rani	Rishi Kapoor
1975	Salaakhen	Seema	Shashi Kapoor
1976	Hera Pheri	Asha	Vinod Khanna
1976	Shankar Shambhu	Pinky Singh	Feroz Khan
1976	Bundalbaaz	Nisha Sharma	Rajesh Khanna
1976	Sankoch	Lalita	Jeetendra
1977	Apnapan	Radhika	Jeetendra
1977	Kasam Khoon Ki	Radha	Jeetendra
1977	Thief of Bagdad	Shehzadi Rukhsana	Shatrughan Sinha
1978	Phaansi	Chhaya	Shashi Kapoor
1978	Bandie	Princess Radha Singh	Uttam Kumar
1978	Amar Shakti	Princess Sunita	Shashi Kapoor
1979	Khandaan	Usha	Jeetendra
1980	Ganga Aur Suraj	Sarita	Shashi Kapoor
1980	Garam Khoon	Rama	Vinod Khanna
1981	Waqt Ki Deewar	Priya	Sanjeev Kumar
1981	Chehre Pe Chehra	Diana	Sanjeev Kumar
1981	Raaz	Seema	Raj Babbar
1982	Lakshmi	Guest Appearance	
1982	Dharam Kanta	Chanda	Jeetendra
1982	Dil Hi Dil Mein	Asha Singh	Navin Nischol, Vinod Mehra
1982	Barrister		
1984	Chakma		
1985	Kaala Sooraj	Karuna	Shatrughan Sinha
1987	Goraa	Roopa	Rajesh Khanna
1987	Madadgaar	Sunita	Jeetendra
1988	Do Waqt Ki Roti	Ganga	Sanjeev Kumar

== Awards ==
- Filmfare Best Female Playback Award in 1975 for the song "Tu Hi Saagar Hai Tu Hi Kinara" in Sankalp (1975)
- Miyan Tansen Award in 1975 for the song "Tu Hi Saagar Hai Tu Hi Kinara" in Sankalp
- Nominated as Filmfare Best Female Playback Award for rendering the classical "Bandhi Re Kahe Preet" in Sankoch (1976)
