= Waqt Ki Deewar =

- Theatrical release poster
- Directed by: Ravi Tandon
- Written by: B. Aar Ishara (dialogues); Anjaan (lyrics)
- Screenplay by: Jyoti Swaroop; Vinod Dewan
- Story by: Jyoti Swaroop; Vinod Dewan
- Produced by: T. C. Dewan
- Starring: Sanjeev Kumar; Jeetendra; Sulakshana Pandit; Neetu Singh
- Cinematography: K. K. Mahajan
- Edited by: V. N. Mayekar
- Music by: Laxmikant–Pyarelal
- Production company: Modern Pictures
- Release date: 23 January 1981
- Running time: 156 minutes
- Country: India
- Language: Hindi

Waqt Ki Deewar (transl. The Wall of Time) is a 1981 Indian Hindi-language action film, produced by T.C. Dewan under the Modern Pictures banner and directed by Ravi Tandon. It stars Sanjeev Kumar, Jeetendra, Sulakshana Pandit, Neetu Singh in lead roles and music composed by Laxmikant–Pyarelal.

== Plot ==
Cruel and lustful Thakur Dayal Singh brutally rapes Sarla, forcing her to commit suicide, gives the blame to his elder brother and kills him. Sarla's estranged father Lala Kedarnath vows to take revenge on Bade Thakur, he shoots him (not knowing that he is already dead) and arrested by the police. So his young sons, Vikram and Munna become homeless. Vikram and Munna try to stay together, but are separated by fate. Years later, Vikram has taken to a life of crime with Ranveer Singh, who unknown to Vikram, is none other than Thakur Dayal Singh. While assisting his friend, Peter to meet with his future wife, Ruby, Vikram meets with the ravishing Priya and both fall in love with each other. Meanwhile, Munna finds a place in the home and heart of the devout and kind-hearted Sher Khan, who now calls him Amar. Amar grows up to be an honest man. His duties led him to meet many thieves and criminals, one of whom is the beautiful Soni. After a few misunderstandings, both fall in love and Soni pledges to give up her life of crime. Then one day, when Amar is being overwhelmed by a number of gangsters, Vikram comes to his help and both become good friends. This friendship does not last long as Amar soon starts to suspect Vikram. Will Vikram and Amar ever come to know of their true relationship? Will Ranveer Singh be exposed as Thakur Dayal Singh?

== Cast ==
- Sanjeev Kumar as Vikram
- Jeetendra as Amar
- Sulakshana Pandit as Priya
- Neetu Singh as Soni
- Deven Verma as Rajpat
- Pran as Sher Khan
- Kader Khan as Lala Kedarnath
- Amjad Khan as Thakur Dayal Singh / Ranveer Singh
- Satyendra Kapoor as Anokhelal
- Nazneen as Sarla
- Preeti Ganguli as Ruby
- Paintal as Peter

== Soundtrack ==
Song	Singer
"Chal Canima Dekhan Ko Jaye Gori"	Kishore Kumar, Asha Bhosle
"Manchahi Ladki Kahin Koi Mil Jaye"	Kishore Kumar, Asha Bhosle
"Ae Yaar Teri Yaari Hamen Jaan Se Hai Pyari"	Kishore Kumar, Mohammed Rafi
"Kamaal Mori Bindiya"	Asha Bhosle
"Jawani Ka Guzra Zamana Hamen Yaad Aane Laga Hai, Jadu Sa Chhane Laga Hai"	Asha Bhosle, Mohammed Rafi, Manna Dey
