= Shikast =

1953 film

- Poster
- Directed by: Ramesh Saigal
- Written by: Wajahat Mirza
- Story by: Wajahat Mirza
- Produced by: Ramesh Saigal
- Starring: Dilip Kumar; Nalini Jaywant
- Cinematography: Cinematographer : Krishan Saigal; Director of Photography : K. H. Kapadia
- Edited by: Pratap Dave
- Music by: Shankar–Jaikishan
- Production company: Asha Deep
- Distributed by: Asha Deep
- Release date: 18 September 1953
- Country: India
- Language: Hindi

Shikast (transl. Defeat) is a 1953 Hindi drama film produced and directed by Ramesh Saigal. A remake of the 1953 Bengali film Palli Samaj which in turn was based on the 1916 Bengali novel of the same name by Sharat Chandra Chatterjee, the film stars Dilip Kumar, Nalini Jaywant, Durga Khote, Om Prakash and K. N. Singh. The film's music is by Shankar–Jaikishan. Wajahat Mirza wrote the story and dialogues for this film.

== Plot ==
After a seven-year absence, Dr. Ram Singh returns to his village intending to sell his land and go back to the city. He finds that the peasants are being mistreated by the local landlord and the landlord's sister, Sushma. The doctor and Sushma were once in love, but in his absence she has become an embittered widow. Unwilling to see the peasants suffer further, Ram decides not to sell and opens a school and a hospital instead. When the plague breaks out, the doctor saves Sushma's son and the flames of love are rekindled. However, social mores prevent any opening of hearts and (unable to express her feelings in any other way) Sushma resorts to further acts of cruelty in order to prevent Ram from leaving. Meanwhile, her brother stirs up hostility against the pair by spreading malicious rumours which excite the superstitious villagers, leading to a trial and a watery climax.

== Cast ==
- Dilip Kumar as Dr. Ram Singh
- Nalini Jaywant as Sushma
- Durga Khote as Mrs. Madhav Singh
- K. N. Singh as Madhav Singh
- Om Prakash as Dheeru
- Leela Mishra
- Master Kapoor as Munna
- Shyamlal
- Hemwati
- Baby Lakshmi

== Soundtrack ==
While Shankar-Jaikishan provided the music direction, the lyrics were written by Shailendra and Hasrat Jaipuri.

Song	Singer	Lyricist
"Kare Badra Tu Na Ja..."	Lata Mangeshkar	Shailendra
"Badle Rang Jahan Ke..."	Lata Mangeshkar	Shailendra
"Nayi Zindagi Se Pyar Karke Dekh..." (Solo)	Lata Mangeshkar	Shailendra
"O Ghan Saanwre Unse Kahiyo Baat..."	Lata Mangeshkar	Shailendra
"Raat Jaagke Nikaloon Tere Intezaar Mein..."	Lata Mangeshkar	Hasrat Jaipuri
"Nayi Zindagi Se Pyar Karke Dekh..." (Duet)	Lata Mangeshkar, Mohammed Rafi	Shailendra
"Hum To Hain Khel Khilone..."	Hemant Kumar	Shailendra
"Jab Jab Phool Khile, Tujhe Yaad Kiya Humne..."	Lata Mangeshkar, Talat Mahmood	Shailendra
"Sapnon Ki Suhani Duniya Ko..."	Talat Mahmood	Shailendra
"Toofan Mein Ghiri Hain Meri Taqdeer Ki Rahen..."	Talat Mahmood	Hasrat Jaipuri
"Chamke Bijaria Garje Megh Mat Ja Re Balam Pardeswa..."	Asha Bhosle	Hasrat Jaipuri
"Gulshan Mein Jal Raha Hai Ulfat Ka Ashiana..."	Mohammed Rafi	
