= Avtaar =

1983 film by Mohan Kumar

- Directed by: Mohan Kumar
- Produced by: Mohan Kumar
- Starring: Rajesh Khanna; Shabana Azmi; Sujit Kumar; AK Hangal; Gulshan Grover; Shashi Puri; Priti Sapru; Sachin; Yunus Parvez
- Cinematography: K. K. Mahajan
- Music by: Laxmikant Pyarelal
- Production company: Emkay Pictures
- Release date: 11 March 1983
- Country: India
- Language: Hindi

Avtaar is a 1983 drama film starring Rajesh Khanna and Shabana Azmi. It was directed by Mohan Kumar, and the music was by Laxmikant–Pyarelal, and lyrics by Anand Bakshi. Avtaar was critically acclaimed and earned around ₹8 crore worldwide. The film earned several Filmfare Award nominations. Rajesh Khanna received an All-India Critics Association (AICA) Best Actor Award for his performance in this film in 1983.

The film was later remade into the Telugu film O Thandri Theerpu (1985), starring Murali Mohan and Jayasudha, in Kannada as Kaliyuga (1984), starring Rajesh and Aarthi, in Malayalam as Jeevitham (1984), starring Madhu and Unni Mary and in Tamil as Vaazhkai (1984), starring Sivaji Ganesan and Ambika.

== Plot ==
The film starts Radha Kishan garlanding her husband Avtaar Kishan's bust while she mourns his death, then flashes back thirty years. Radha, is the only daughter of Seth Jugal Kishore, a billionaire businessman in Mumbai, and is in love with Avtaar, a Punjabi Hindu refugee from West Punjab, working as a mechanic. Her father disapproves, so the two elope and marry.

After various hardships, the couple ultimately succeed; after three decades, Avtaar is the owner of a small house and a fortune. They have two sons, Chandar and Ramesh. Chandar is married to Renu, while Ramesh is married to Sudha. Avtaar also has a servant named Sewak, whom Avtaar had found in Mumbai as an orphan.

Chandar marries the only daughter of Seth Laxmi Narayan, a millionaire businessman of Mumbai and becomes a Gharjamai against Avtaar's wishes. Meanwhile, Ramesh registers the house under his wife's name instead of Radha's, going against his father's wishes. This enrages Avtaar and he leaves his home, accompanied by Radha and Sewak.

With the help of a moneylender, Avtaar starts his own garage. Avtaar faces an uphill task, since he has no money to buy equipment, is aged and his right hand gets crippled in an accident. Sewak helps his master by illegally donating blood to arrange for funds, but when Avtaar assumes Sewak has resorted to asking for help from Avtaar's sons, Avtaar's former boss Bawaji reveals the truth. Moved, Radha and Avtaar come to regard him as a true son.

Meanwhile, both Ramesh and Chandar are enjoying their lives. Avtaar's luck suddenly changes and the carburetor he is working on gives a successful resulting in him obtaining a patent for it. Avtaar starts manufacturing the engine parts, and creates an industrial empire headed by himself, his wife and Sewak.

Meanwhile, Avtaar's best friend, a fellow Muslim car mechanic called Rashid Ahmed who is very aged suffers at the hands of his cruel daughter-in-law, Zubaida who has made a slave out of him and doesn't even feed him properly and mistreats him very horribly. His son Anwar works in Dubai as an expat worker and has just arrived home. Old Rashid suddenly becomes very sick due to the ill treatment by Zubaida. Anwar expels him from the house saying he cannot afford to pay for his treatment etc. Avtaar sees this and opens an old-age home for people who are suffering from their cruel relatives and names it "Apna Ghar" (Our Home in Hindi).

Avtaar out of vengeance, unethically and deliberately puts Laxmi Narayan out of business by selling his automobile parts at much lower rates than those of Laxmi Narayan and furthermore completely ruins him by offering double wages to all his factory workers and steals them all as well. Someone commits fraud at the bank Ramesh works loyally but he is framed for it and arrested. Sudha comes to Avtaar for help, but he rebukes her and sends her away. Radha is angered, but remains silent. Avtaar secretly gives Bawaji the bail money on the condition that he tells no one; Bawaji bails Ramesh.

Meanwhile, Anwar and Zubeida learn that Rashid has received a small fortune from his provident fund. Zubeida and Anwar ask him to give them all the money for safekeeping but he spits on their faces and asks them never to show their face to him ever again.

Meanwhile, holding Chandar responsible for the loss in business, Laxmi Narayan throws him out of the house. Ramesh, Chandar and Sudha go to Radha for assistance, but Avtaar disagrees. Next day, Avtaar goes to the office and does not return, in order to not face Radha. Radha calls him and late at night, tries to convince him to help their children, but he refuses to listen. Emotionally, Radha accuses him of having become heartless. Bawaji meets Radha, who tells him the whole story. Bawaji confesses the truth to her.

After learning the truth, Radha realizes her horrible mistake and tries to call Avtaar. Sewak informs her that Avtaar has had a massive heart attack resulting from her severe reprimand. Avtaar has already written his will. He hands it to Radha and dies. He gave 2 lakhs to both of his sons only due to their mistreatments and betrayals that hardened and toughened him up and led him to become a successful businessman. As he considers Sewak his one and only true son he tasks him to carry out his final rites and cremate him. The story returns to the beginning of the film once again.

== Cast ==
- Rajesh Khanna as Avtaar Kishan
- Shabana Azmi as Radha Kishan/Radha Kishore (Avtaar's wife)
- Madan Puri as Seth Jugal Kishore (Radha's father)
- Sujit Kumar as Bawaji (Avtaar's mentor)
- A. K. Hangal as Rashid Ahmed (Avtaar's best friend)
- Sachin Pilgaonkar as Sewak (Avtaar's servant and adopted son)
- Gulshan Grover as Chandar Kishan (Avtaar's younger son and Renu's husband)
- Shashi Puri as Ramesh Kishan (Avtaar's elder son and Sudha's husband)
- Priti Sapru as Sudha Kishan (Ramesh's Wife)
- Rajni Sharma as Renu C. Kishan/Renu Narayan (Chandar's wife)
- Ranjan Grewal as Anwar R. Ahmed (Rashid's son)
- Madhu Malini as Zubaida Anwar Ahmed (Anwar's Wife)
- Pinchoo Kapoor as Seth Laxmi Narayan (Renu's father)
- Yunus Parvez as Ram Dulare Chaurasia, Paanwala (Avtaar's friend)
- Shivraj as Gopal (Avtaar's servant)

== Soundtrack ==
Lyrics: Anand Bakshi

#	Song	Singer
1	"Uparwale Tera Jawab Nahin"	Kishore Kumar
2	"Yeh Saari Duniya Hai Aati Jaati"	Kishore Kumar
3	"Yaaron Utho, Chalo, Bhaago, Daudo"	Kishore Kumar, Mahendra Kapoor
4	"Din, Maheene, Saal Guzarte Jayenge"	Kishore Kumar, Lata Mangeshkar
5	"Chalo, Bulaawa Aaya Hai, Maata Ne Bulaaya Hai"	Mahendra Kapoor, Asha Bhosle, Narendra Chanchal
6	"Zindagi Mauj Udaane Ka Naam Hai"	Mahendra Kapoor, Suresh Wadkar, Alka Yagnik

== Awards ==
31st Filmfare Awards:

Nominated

- Best Film – Emkay Enterprises
- Best Director – Mohan Kumar
- Best Actor – Rajesh Khanna
- Best Actress – Shabana Azmi
- Best Story – Mohan Kumar

== See also ==
- Baghban (2003 film)
