= Madadgaar =

- Lobby card
- Directed by: Ramesh Puri
- Written by: Charandas Shokh (dialogues)
- Produced by: Nirmal Anand
- Starring: Jeetendra; Sulakshana Pandit
- Cinematography: H. Laxminarayan
- Edited by: S.R. Sawant
- Music by: Laxmikant–Pyarelal
- Production company: BNT Films
- Release date: 24 April 1987
- Running time: 129 minutes
- Country: India
- Language: Hindi

Madadgaar (transl. Friend) is a 1987 Indian Hindi-language action film, produced by Nirmal Anand under the BNT Films banner and directed by Ramesh Puri. It stars Jeetendra, Sulakshana Pandit in the pivotal roles and music composed by Laxmikant–Pyarelal.

== Plot ==
After a criminal friend uses him as a pawn in a gold smuggling scheme, honest and hardworking Anand bravely reports the crime, thus foiling the criminal plan. His bravery attracts the attention of Sunita, the daughter of a wealthy industrialist, Sohanlal. The two fall in love, but Sohanlal disapproves of their alliance as Anand is a poor truck driver. Sunita chooses Anand over her father and this causes Sohanlal to suffer a heart attack. Gupta, the legal advisor of Sohanlal takes full advantage of this situation to usurp Sohanlal's wealth. He along with an ex-convict, Raj, sends Sohanlal to Switzerland for medical treatment, while on the other hand, he plans to kill off Sunita. Anand and Sunita must overcome the objections of Sunita's father, as well as the dangerous machinations of the devious Gupta and his thuggish henchman, Raj.

== Cast ==
- Jeetendra as Anand
- Sulakshana Pandit as Sunita
- Aruna Irani as Guddi
- Ranjeet as Dr. Raj
- Shakti Kapoor as Kader
- Madan Puri as Advocate Gupta
- Amrish Puri as Sunita's Uncle
- Om Shivpuri as Sunita's Uncle
- Manmohan Krishna as Sohanlal
- Lalita Pawar as Mrs. Sohanlal

== Soundtrack ==
Lyrics: Anand Bakshi

| Song | Singer |
|---|---|
| "Ek Do Teen Chaar, Humse Karo Pyar, Ho Jao Taiyar" | Kishore Kumar, Asha Bhosle |
| "Kaun Si Jane Film Thi" | Asha Bhosle |
| "Ikraar Kar De Ya Inkaar" | Asha Bhosle |
| "Huzoor Aapka Kya Kasoor" | Manhar Udhas |
| "Kya Hua Yaad Nahin" - 1 | Mohammed Rafi |
| "Kya Hua Yaad Nahin" - 2 | Mohammed Rafi |
