= Ishq Par Zor Nahin =

- Theatrical release poster
- Directed by: Ramesh Saigal
- Written by: Ramesh Saigal (story, screenplay and dialogues)
- Produced by: Suresh Saigal
- Starring: Dharmendra; Sadhana; Biswajeet; Kamini Kaushal; Abhi Bhattacharya; Nadira
- Cinematography: Kishore Rege
- Edited by: Baburao Barodkar
- Music by: S. D. Burman
- Production company: Twinkle Star
- Release date: 16 October 1970
- Country: India
- Language: Hindi

Ishq Par Zor Nahin is a 1970 Hindi romantic film written and directed by Ramesh Saigal. The film stars Dharmendra and Sadhana as the romantic leads, with Biswajeet as his best friend who is also her fiancé. The music is by S. D. Burman, with lyrics by Anand Bakshi. The film was commercially successful at the box office. It was the only film in which Sadhana and Dharmendra appeared together.

== Plot ==
Amar Doraiswamy is the only child of multi-millionaire shipping company owner who lives in a palatial house in Goa, India. Amar introduces a close, but poor friend, Ram, to his father, who employs him conditionally. Amar falls in love with a woman named Sushma Rai, and asks Ram to pen a love letter and poem for her. Sushma gets to read the letter and the poem, and thinking that Ram is Amar, falls in love with him. She meets him, and he is also unknowingly attracted to her, both feel that they are inseparable soul-mates. Then Ram gets a shock when he finds out that Sushma is Amar's intended and decides to stay away from her. But Sushma has other plans, for she intends to marry Ram at any cost, not realizing that by doing this, she is placing not only Ram's life, but also the lives of two other individuals, namely Uma Devi and Lalit, in jeopardy.

== Cast ==
- Dharmendra ... Ram Kumar (Sushma’s boyfriend)
- Sadhana ... Sushma Rai (Ram’s girlfriend)
- Biswajit ... Amar Doraiswamy (Ram’s friend)
- Abhi Bhattacharya ... Mr. Doraiswamy (Amar’s father and Ram’s boss)
- Leela Mishra ... Ram's Mother
- Nadira ... Mrs. Doraiswamy (Amar’s mother)
- Kamini Kaushal ... Uma Devi
- Randhir ... Doraiswamy's business partner
- Jagdish Raj ... Rai
- Udaya Chandrika ... Dancer / Singer
- Jagdeep ... Lalit
- Meena Talpade ... Lalita

== Music and soundtrack ==
The music of the film was composed by S. D. Burman and the lyrics were penned by Anand Bakshi.

#	Title	Singer(s)	Raga
1	"Ishq Par Zor Nahin"	Lata Mangeshkar	Pilu
2	"Yeh Dil Diwana Hai"	Lata Mangeshkar, Mohammed Rafi	
3	"Main To Tere Rang Rati"	Lata Mangeshkar	
4	"Pyar Bhari Ik Baat Chali"	Asha Bhosle	
5	"O Mere Bairagi Bhanwara"	Lata Mangeshkar	
6	"Mehbooba Teri Tasveer"	Mohammed Rafi	
7	"Tum Mujhse Door Chale Jana Na"	Lata Mangeshkar	

== Reception ==
A 2016 review in The Hindu commended Dharmendra for his "sincere, honest and competent performance" and Sadhana for "her million dollar smile", her fluidity "seeping with emotions", and her voice which "conveys an innocence which later actresses lacked". The review went on to say that "Biswajit steals the show with a brilliant performance which is a blend of humanity, negativity and romance."
