= Sankalp =

- Directed by: Ramesh Saigal
- Produced by: Ramesh Saigal
- Starring: Sulakshana Pandit; Bipin Gupta; Farida Jalal
- Music by: Khayyam; Kaifi Azmi (lyrics)
- Release date: 1975
- Country: India
- Language: Hindi

For people with the given name, see Sankalp (given name). Sankalp is a 1975 Bollywood drama film directed by Ramesh Saigal. The song "Tu Hi Sagar Tu Hi Kinara", rendered by Sulakshana Pandit earned her its only Filmfare award. It was composed by Khayyam.

== Plot ==
Rakesh lives with his widowed businessman dad Harkishanlal; elder brother Shyam, his wife, Kamla and their son. He attends college, does extremely well in his exams, and stands first with only one other candidate, who comes from a poor family. Rakesh also has a sweetheart in fellow-collegian, Geeta Sehgal, and both hope to get married soon. Rakesh introduces Geeta to Kamla, and gets instant approval. But there is something troubling Rakesh, he is appalled at the inequalities and injustices in this world, the power the rich have over the poor; why God remains a silent spectator in the light of atrocities, committed on his very own creations. Rakesh sets out to seek answers within his family, and is shunned. His dad and brother want him to lend a hand in their business, but Rakesh does not want any part in it as part of it is being run by black money, surrounded by hypocrites. He stops seeing Geeta, and when Kamla finds this out, she follows him one day and finds him with a group of half-naked, drug-induced hippies. When confronted, Rakesh's only explanation is that he will not marry Geeta as he does not want to get tied down and wants his freedom – what exactly is the freedom that Rakesh seeks – watch as he runs away from home to seek life's meanings along with newfound hippie friends.

== Cast ==
- Sulakshana Pandit as Poojaran
- Sukhdev as Rakesh
- Farida Jalal as Geeta Sehgal
- Arjun Bakshi as Shyam
- Bipin Gupta as Harkishanlal
- Anjali Kadam as Kamla
- Leela Mishra as Rani of Bacharawa

== Soundtrack ==
Sankalp

Studio album by Khayyam
- Released: 1 December 1975
- Genre: Feature film soundtrack
- Label: Saregama
- Producer: Ramesh Saigal

Music composed by Khayyam and lyrics by Kaifi Azmi.

Original Motion Pictures
Track	Song	Singer (s)	Music
1	"Tu Hi Sagar Tu Hi Kinara" Part 1	Sulakshana Pandit & Vinod Sharma
2	"Dhan Tere Kaam Na Aayega"	Mukesh
3	"Sab Thath"	Mukesh	Khayyam
4	"Zindagi Kya Hai"	Mahendra Kapoor
5	"Tu Hi Sagar Tu Hi Kinara" Part 2	Sulakshana Pandit	Khayyam
6	"Ghao Dil Ke"	Mahendra Kapoor	Khayyam
7	"Bhitar Bhitar Khaye Chalo"	Mukesh & Mahendra Kapoor

== Awards and nominations ==
- Filmfare Award for Best Female Playback Singer – Sulakshana Pandit for the song "Tu Hi Sagar Tu Hi Kinara"
