= Narendra Chanchal =

Indian singer (1940–2021)

- Born: 16 October 1940; Amritsar, Punjab, British India (present day - Amritsar, Punjab, India
- Died: 22 January 2021 (aged 80); New Delhi, India
- Occupation: Singer
- Years active: 1973–2021
- Spouse: Namrata Chanchal (m. 1976–2021)

Narendra Chanchal (16 October 1940 – 22 January 2021) was an Indian singer who specialized in religious songs and hymns. Besides several bhajans, Chanchal had also sung songs in Hindi films as well. He was the singer of many iconic bhajans & Hindi film songs in history.

Some of the popular Hindu devotional songs sung by Narendra Chanchal include: Chalo Bulawa Aaya Hai, Tune Mujhe Bulaya Sherawaliye, Ambe Tu Hai Jagadambe Kali, Hanuman Chalisa, Sankat Mochan Naam Tiharo, Ram Se Bada Ram Ka Naam among others.

== Personal life ==
Chanchal was born in a religious Punjabi Hindu family in Namak Mandi, Amritsar on 16 October 1940. He grew up in a religious atmosphere which inspired him to start singing bhajans and aartis. He married Namrata Chanchal in 1976. He has one daughter.

== Career ==
After years of struggle, Chanchal sang a Bollywood song Beshak Mandir Masjid for the 1973 film Bobby and won Filmfare Best Male Playback Award. He made a mark in the world of devotional songs. He also earned honorary citizenship of the US state of Georgia.

Chanchal has released a biography called Midnight Singer which narrates his life, struggles and hardships leading to achievements. He visited Katra Vaishno Devi every year on 29 December and performed on the last day of the year.

== Death ==
Chanchal died at age 80 on 22 January 2021 at Apollo Hospital in New Delhi, due to age-related illness.

== Discography ==
Song	Film	Year released	Language	Additional information
"Beshak Mandir Masjid Todo"	Bobby	1973	Hindi	Won Filmfare Award for Best Male Playback Singer
"main benaam ho gayaa.."	Benaam	1974	Hindi	
"Baki Kuchh Bacha To Mahangayi Maar Gayi"	Roti Kapda Aur Makan	1974	Hindi	With Lata Mangeshkar, Mukesh and Jaani Babu Qawwal
"MAIN HA JATT PUNJAB DA”	Dharam Jeet	1975	Punjabi	solo
"Vehrey Vich Vairi Vasde”	Yamla Jatt	1977	Punjabi	solo
"Fulla da banaia harr"	Jai Mata Di	1977	Punjabi	cameo appearance
Tu Ne Mujhe Bulaya	Aasha	1980	Hindi	With Mohammad Rafi
"Chalo Bulawa Aaya Hain Mata Ne Bulaya Hain"	Avtaar	1983	Hindi	With Asha Bhosle and Mahendra Kapoor
"Do Ghut Pila De Sakia"	Kala Suraj	1985	Hindi	
"Huye Hain Kuchh Aise Wo Humse Paraye"	Anjaane	1994	Hindi	With Kumar Sanu and Sadhna Sargam

== Special appearance ==
Devotional Singer Special Appearance in Zee Tv, Television Serial 12/24 Karol Bagh for Jagdamba, Maa Ambe "JAGRAATA" (Maha Episode No 30), (Episode No 31)
