= Ramesh Saigal =

Indian film director

- Occupation: Film director
- Years active: 1942–1975
- Known for: Railway Platform, Shola Aur Shabnam and Ishq Par Zor Nahin

Ramesh Saigal was an Indian film director, producer, screenwriter and actor in Hindi language films.

== Professional life ==
His major work includes Railway Platform (1955), Shola Aur Shabnam (1961) and Ishq Par Zor Nahin (1970).

He was instrumental in giving veteran actor Sunil Dutt a break in the film Railway Platform (1955) when Sunil Dutt was hosting the show, Lipton Ki Mehfil on Radio Ceylon. While covering the Dilip Kumar movie Shikast in 1953, Dutt met director Ramesh Saigal, who impressed by his personality and voice, offered him a role in his upcoming movie. Ramesh Saigal coined the new screen name "Sunil Dutt" for the debutante actor whose real name was Balraj Dutt to avoid name conflicts with the then veteran actor Balraj Sahni.

== Filmography ==
=== Director ===
Year	Film	Notes
1975	Sankalp	
1970	Ishq Par Zor Nahin	
1961	Shola Aur Shabnam	
1958	Phir Subha Hogi	
1956	26 January	
1956	Bharti	
1955	Railway Platform	Debut film of Sunil Dutt
1953	Shikast	
1950	Samadhi	
1948	Shaheed	
1947	Renuka	
1944	Ghar Ki Shobha	
1942	Khandaan	Assistant director

=== Producer ===
Year	Film
1961	Shola Aur Shabnam
1958	Phir Subha Hogi
1953	Shikast

=== Screenwriter ===
Year	Film	Role
1970	Ishq Par Zor Nahin	Writer
1961	Shola Aur Shabnam	Writer
1955	Railway Platform	Story, Screenplay, Dialogue
1953	Anarkali	Screenplay, Dialogue
