= Salaakhen (1975 film) =

- Poster
- Directed by: A. Salaam
- Produced by: Parvesh C Mehra
- Starring: Shashi Kapoor; Sulakshana Pandit; Mehmood
- Music by: Ravindra Jain
- Distributed by: Shemaroo Video Pvt. Ltd.
- Release date: 26 December 1975
- Country: India
- Language: Hindi

Salaakhen is a 1975 Hindi movie produced by Parvesh Mehra and directed by A. Salaam. It stars Shashi Kapoor, Sulakshana Pandit, A. K. Hangal, Mehmood, Amrish Puri and Ramesh Deo. The music was composed by Ravindra Jain. The rights to this film are owned by Shah Rukh Khan's Red Chillies Entertainment.

== Plot ==
Raju (Shashi Kapoor) and Guddi (Sulakshana Pandit) are childhood friends and neighbors, who are virtually inseparable. Raju's father is arrested after a dramatic police chase for breaking, entering and theft, resulting in their separation. Guddi grows up to be a professional stage singer and dancer, while Raju grows up to be a card-sharp and a thief. Years later, both Raju (now called Chander) and Guddi (now called Seema) meet and fall in love with each other, unaware that they were childhood friends. While Seema is on her way to her birthplace for religious reasons, Chander too is headed that way, to get himself arrested so that he can be jailed for a motive, that gets him a hefty sum of money from a gangster.

== Cast ==
- Shashi Kapoor - Raju/Chander
- Sulakshana Pandit - Guddi/Seema
- Goga Kapoor - Casino Owner
- Sajjan - Ram Lal, Seema's father
- Mehmood - Abdul Rehman
- Amrish Puri - Master
- Anjana Mumtaz - Farida
- Ramesh Deo - Gautam
- Pinchoo Kapoor - Haridas, Rich Man
- Mac Mohan - Ranga
- Moolchand - Shopkeeper
- Shivraj - Advani
- Sudhir - Inspector Ahmed
- Keshto Mukherjee - Qaidi No. 840
- Brahm Bhardwaj - Insurance Company Manager
- V. Gopal - Qaidi No. 420
- Master Ratan - Young Raju
- Uma Dutt - Police Inspector
- Birbal - David
- Tarun Ghosh - Police Inspector
- P. Jairaj - Jailor
- Shammi Kapoor - Truck Driver (Cameo Appearance)

== Crew ==
- Director - A. Salaam
- Producer - Parvesh C. Mehra
- Music Director - Ravindra Jain
- Lyricist - Dev Kohli, Hasrat Jaipuri, Ravindra Jain
- Playback Singers - Asha Bhosle, Hemlata, Kishore Kumar, Sulakshana Pandit

== Music ==
- Song "Seema Seema Seema" was listed at #29 on Binaca Geetmala annual list 1976

| Song title | Singers | Lyricist | Time |
|---|---|---|---|
| "Chal Chal Kahin Akele Mein" | Sulakshana Pandit | Dev Kohli | 1:44 |
| "Chal Chal Kahin Akele Mein" | Sulakshana Pandit, Hemlata | Dev Kohli | 6:39 |
| "Maze Uda Lo Jawani Rahe Na Rahe" | Asha Bhosle | Hasrat Jaipuri | 5:56 |
| "Mere Dekh Ke Lambe Baal" | Asha Bhosle | Hasrat Jaipuri | 5:47 |
| "Seema Seema Seema" | Kishore Kumar, Asha Bhosle | Ravindra Jain | 5:51 |
