= Raaja =

- Poster
- Directed by: K. Shankar
- Written by: Inder Raj Anand
- Produced by: Sandow M. M. A. Chinnappa Thevar
- Starring: Rishi Kapoor; Sulakshana Pandit; Prem Chopra; Asrani; Aruna Irani; David Abraham Cheulkar; Swaraj Kumar Gupta; Jagdeep; Shashi Kiran; Om Prakash; Ghanshyam Rohera
- Music by: Rahul Dev Burman
- Release date: 1975
- Running time: 140 minutes
- Country: India
- Language: Hindi

Raaja is a 1975 Indian Hindi-language action thriller film directed by K. Shankar. It stars Rishi Kapoor (in double role), Sulakshana Pandit, Prem Chopra, Asrani, Aruna Irani, Jagdeep among others. The music was composed by Rahul Dev Burman.

== Plot ==
The narrative focuses on twin brothers, Raaja and Ram. Raaja is a commoner, while Ram serves as a CID inspector. Upon discovering that their elder sister, whom they believed to be deceased, is in fact alive and under the control of the bandit Sher Singh, they embark on a mission to rescue her.

Raaja becomes enamored with Rani, but she struggles to distinguish between the two brothers. To assist her, Ram grows a mustache to help her identify her beloved. Tragically, Ram is killed by Sher Singh's henchmen while attempting to locate their sister, leaving Raaja to seek both her rescue and to avenge Ram's death.

With the assistance of the police, Raaja identifies the culprits and, disguised as Ram, brings them to justice. He and his team rescue their sister from Sher Singh, but she is critically injured and ultimately does not survive. Despite this loss, Raaja and Rani eventually marry.

== Cast ==
- Rishi Kapoor as Raaja/Inspector Ram (dual role)
- Sulakshana Pandit as Rani
- Prem Chopra as Sher Singh
- Asrani as Chander
- Aruna Irani as Parvati
- David Abraham as Dayaram Divecha
- Om Prakash as Rani's Father
- Jagdeep as Producer Malpani
- Shashi Kiran as Chander's friend
- Ghanshyam Rohera
- Swaraj Kumar Gupta

== Soundtrack ==
Lyrics: Anand Bakshi

#	Song	Singer
1	"Kal Yahaan Aayi Thi Woh"	Kishore Kumar
2	"Jee Chaahe Jee Bharke Tujhe Pyaar Kar Loon"	Kishore Kumar, Lata Mangeshkar
3	"Kaun Hoon Main, Kaun Hai Tu"	Kishore Kumar, Asha Bhosle
4	"Mere Roothe Balam Se Kehdo"	Asha Bhosle
5	"Maaro Jaan Se Maaro"	Lata Mangeshkar
