= Usha Timothy =

Indian singer

- Born: Nagpur, Maharashtra, India
- Occupation: Playback Singer
- Years active: 1962–present

Usha Timothy is a veteran Bollywood playback singer. Referred to as a "Singer with a difference" She began her career in the film Himalay Ki Godmein (1965). She has sung 5,000 songs in multiple Indian languages such as Hindi, Malayalam, Punjabi, Bhojpuri and Marathi etc.

== Early life ==
Usha Timothy was born in Nagpur, Maharashtra, India in a Christian family. Her father worked for the CBI. She was the youngest of the eleven siblings. Her elder brother, Madhusudan Timothy was inclined to music and often organized musical jalsas (gatherings) at home. Usha took her early musical lessons from Pt Laxman Prasad. She also learnt Tappas and Thumris from Nirmala Devi.

== Career ==
Usha was discovered by Kalyanji Anandji. In 1956–57, a musical concert was held. It was called Kalyanji Anandji Night and prominent male singers like Mohammed Rafi, Manna Dey, Hemant Kumar, Mukesh performed songs composed by Kalyanji Anandji. The event was organized by Usha's father. Since there was no female singer to perform, Madhusudan suggested eight-year-old Usha's name to Kalyanji Anandji. She performed "Rasik Balma" from Chori Chori (1956) before the audience. Her performance pleased the audience as well as Kalyanji Anandji, who made her a part of their troupe. She did what was considered her first playback for them in Himalay Ki Godmein (1965). In that film, her duet with Mohammed Rafi "Tu Raat Khadi Thi Chhat Pe" was well received. However, the first playback she gave was for a song in the 1962 film Durga Puja. Her major work was with Kalyanji Anandji for whom she sang many hit songs in the 1970s most of them duets with Mohammed Rafi.

In 1967, Laxmikant Pyarelal gave her two songs in the film Taqdeer. The songs were "Jab Jab Bahar Aayi" and "Papa Jaldi Aa Jana", both songs became popular. She was greatly inspired by Mohammed Rafi. She used to ask newcomers to follow the singing style of Rafi. She has also sung with Kishore Kumar in the song "Are Rafta Rafta Dekho Aankh Meri Ladi Hai".

== Popular Songs ==
Some of her popular songs in Bollywood films include:

- "Natkhat Pare Hat Chhod" (Maharani Padmini) (1964)
- "Taqdeer Ne Kya Angdaai Li" (Sunehre Qadam) (1966)
- "Jab Jab Bahaar Aayi" (Taqdeer) (1967)
- "London Paris Ghoom Ke Dekhen" (Parivaar) (1968)
- "Dhol Baja Dhol Dhol Jaaniya" (Vishwas) (1969)
- "Honthon Pe Inkaar Thoda Thoda" (Raat Ke Andhere Mein) (1969)
- "Ae Sapnon Ke Raja" (Nateeja) (1969)
- "Jo Mama Mera Aayega" (Heer Ranjha) (1970)
- "Main Hoon Saamne Tu Mere Saamne" (Kaanch Aur Heera) (1972)
- "Are Rafta Rafta Dekho" (Kahani Kismat Ki) (1973)
- "Ho Bairi Saiyaan Ki Nazariya" (Uljhan) (1975)
- "Kali Kali Zulfon Mein" (Farishta Ya Qaatil) (1977)
- "Honolulu Se Aayi Hoon Main" (Khanjar) (1979)
- "Meri Jaan Tumse Mohabbat Hai" (Mera Salaam) (1980)
- "Ja Pori Ja" (Rahem Dil Jallad) (1985)

== Collaborations ==
=== Kalyanji Anandji ===
Usha Timothy has sung over a hundred songs in her collaboration with Kalyanji Anandji. Kalyanji Anandji were the very first to trace Usha's musical talent, incidental in a musical soiree. Impressed, they aimed at making her a prominent singer in Bollywood. They gave her "Tu Raat Khadi Thi" with Mohammed Rafi to sing in the 1965 film Himalay Ki Godmein starring Mala Sinha.. She was nervous singing with the legendary singer. The song proved to be a major hit and was a turning point of her career. This, however, was not her debut work, she sang in a few films before it. Her major body of work is credited with Kalyanji Anandji. She has also worked with other composers like Bulo C Rani, Roshan, Hansraj Behl, S.N. Tripathi, S. Mohinder, Sardar Malik, Usha Khanna, Sonik-Omi, Babul, Lala Sattar and Jagdish Khanna.

=== Mohammed Rafi ===
Usha was a great fan of Mohammed Rafi since her childhood. She had grown up listening to Lata Mangeshkar and Mohammed Rafi songs. She recorded her first hit track "Tu Raat Khadi Thi" in Himalay Ki Godmein. The popularity of this song made them a successful pair. She has sung with other major playback singers including Mukesh, Kishore Kumar, Shamshad Begum, Suman Kalyanpur, Hemlata and Krishna Kalle. Remembering Shamshad Begum, she says, "Shamshad ji had a very attractive and loving personality. She used to treat me like her own Child. Her voice had that "Khanak" and openness which I have never seen in any other singer's. During recording, She used to say, Beta Dum (power) Ke Saath Gaao and I used to laugh, Shamshad ji aapke jaisi power to kisi ki voice mein nahin hai!". Usha Timothy was also a regular participant in the shows of C. Ramchandra also. She says, "I used to be part of his shows regularly. In fact, the famous Pradeep song, 'Aye Mere Watan Ke Logon' was initially sung as a duet by me with C. Ramchandra sahab for a show."

== Filmography ==
List of Hindi films:

1. Durga Puja (1962)
2. Birju Uystad (1964)
3. Maharani Padmini (1964)
4. Char Chakram (1965)
5. Himalay Ki God Mein (1965)
6. Sati Nari (1965)
7. Sunehre Kadam (1966)
8. Veer Bajarang (1966)
9. Vidyarthi (1966)
10. Johar in Bombay (1967)
11. Mera Munna (1967)
12. Ram Rajya (1967)
13. Taqdeer (1967)
14. Fareb (1968)
15. Har Har Gange (1968)
16. Parivar (1968)
17. Apna Khoon Apna Dushman (1969)
18. Mahua (1969)
19. Nateeja (1969)
20. Raat Ke Andhere Mein (1969)
21. Vishwas (1969)
22. Gunahon Ke Raste (1970)
23. Heer Raanjha (1970)
24. Truck Driver (1970)
25. Khandan De Ohle (1970) [Punjabi]
26. Ek Din Aadhi Raat (1971)
27. Johar Mehmood in Hong Kong (1971)
28. Ladki Pasand Hai (1971)
29. Shri Krishna Leela (1971)
30. Kanch Aur Heera (1972)
31. Chattan Singh (1974)
32. Hamrahi (1974)
33. Aaja Sanam (1975)
34. Anokha (1975)
35. Do Thug (1975)
36. Jaan Hazir Hai (1975)
37. Uljhan (1975)
38. Zorro (1975)
39. Farishta Ya Qatil (1977)
40. Atithee (1978)
41. Besharam (1978)
42. Kal Subah (1978)
43. Nasbandi (1978)
44. Khanjar (1980)
45. Mera Salaam (1981)
46. Pyar Ke Rahi (1982)
47. Pyar Bada Nadan (1984)
48. Rahemdil Jallad (1985)
49. Sone Ka Pinjara (1986)
50. Saat Ladkiyaan (1989)
51. Aakhri Chetawani (1993)
52. Pardesi (1993)
