= Aa Jaa Sanam =

1968 Indian Hindi film

Aaja Sanam
- Directed by: Yusuf Naqvi
- Produced by: S. A Mehmood
- Starring: Feroz Khan; Tanuja
- Music by: Usha Khanna
- Release date: 10 January 1968
- Country: India
- Language: Hindi

Aaja Sanam is a 1968 Bollywood romantic drama film directed by Yusuf Naqvi. The film stars Feroz Khan, Tanuja and Deven Verma. The film's music is by Usha Khanna and the lyrics by Indeevar.

== Cast ==
- Feroz Khan as Dr. Satish
- Tanuja as Shanti
- Deven Verma as Dr. Kaushal Verma
- Sulochana Chatterjee as Kamini
- Bipin Gupta as Kamini's dad
- Mukri as Chandu
- Shivraj as Radhekiran

== Plot ==
Dr. Satish travels from the big city to a small village, where he can serve the poor who cannot afford to go to the city for medical treatment. Once in the village, he meets with Shanti, who lives with her dad, Radhekiran, a watchman. Both Shanti and Satish fall in love, and exchange vows to be married. Radhekiran has an accident, and dies, leaving Shanti to re-locate, without notifying Satish. Satish is devastated at losing Shanti, and tries to locate her, to no avail. His parents want him to marry Kamini, and he agrees to do so. It is then he comes across Shanti, and he is shocked to see that Shanti has given birth to baby-boy, but will not disclose who the father is.

== Soundtrack ==
Song	Singer
"Jaane Kahan Gaye Tum"	Mohammed Rafi
"Shaam-E-Bahaara, Subh-E-Chaman"	Mohammed Rafi
"Main Chum Loon Yeh Adayen, Zara Kareeb Aao"	Mohammed Rafi, Usha Timothy
"Ae Mere Chanchal Chanda So Jaa Chain Se"	Asha Bhosle, Usha Khanna
"Aaj Ki Raat Mere Waaste Kya Layi Hai"	Asha Bhosle
"Aaja, Khadi Hoon Teri Raahon Mein"	Asha Bhosle
