= Shivraj (actor) =

Indian actor

Shivraj (Hindi: शिवराज; 11 June 1920 – 3 June 2017) was an Indian actor.

== Selected filmography ==
- Singaar (1949)
- Andolan (1951) (He played a key role)
- Patita (1953)
- Devdas (1955)
- Seema (1955)
- Dekh Kabira Roya (1957)
- Miss Mary (1957)
- Paigham (1959)
- Ujala (1959)
- Jija Ji (1961) (Punjabi film)
- Junglee (1961)
- Rakhi (1962)
- Bharosa (1963)
- Rajkumar (1964)
- Janwar (1965)
- Do Badan (1966)
- Mera Saaya (1966)
- Pyar Kiye Jaa (1966)
- Baharon Ke Sapne (1967)
- Shagird (1967)
- Aadmi (1968)
- Saraswatichandra (1968)
- Do Raaste (1969)
- Adhikar (1971)
- Anamika (1973)
- Yaadon Ki Baaraat (1973)
- Imaan (1974)
- Naya Din Nai Raat (1974)
- Ujala Hi Ujala (1974)
- Resham Ki Dori (1974)
- Aa Jaa Sanam (1975)
- Jaggu (1975)
- Salaakhen (1975)
- Uljhan (1975)
- Amar Akbar Anthony (1977)
- Do Musafir (1978)
- Kasme Vaade (1978)
- Rahu Ketu (1978)
- Sarkari Mehmaan (1979)
- Inspector Eagle (1979)
- Jwalamukhi (1980 film)
- Katilon Ke Kaatil (1981)
- Dil-e-Nadaan (1982)
- Bade Dil Wala (1983)
- Avtaar(1983)
- All Rounder (1984)
- Hum Se Na Jita Koi (1984)
- Hum Hain Lajawab (1984)
- Aakhir Kyon? (1985)
- Mard (1985)
- Ilzaam (1986)
- Aap Ke Saath (1986)
- Ek Aur Sikander (1986)
- Dil Ke Jharoke Main (1997)
- Mrityudand (1997)

=== Television ===
Year	Serial	Role	Channel	Notes
1994	Junoon	Ramdas, Servant	DD National	
