= Sikandar Khanna =

Sikandar Khanna was an Indian bollywood film director. He died during the making of Phool Khile Hain Gulshan Gulshan.

== Filmography ==
As Director

- Nishaan(1983)
- Yari Dushmani (1980)
- Phool Khile Hain Gulshan Gulshan (1978)
- Umar Qaid (1975)
- Zinda Dil (1975)
- Prabhat (1973)
