= Shyam Kumar =

Indian cricketer

Shyam Kumar (born M. Shyam Kumar) was an Indian cricketer. He was a right-handed batsman and right-arm medium-pace bowler who played for Kerala. He was born in Tellicherry.

Kumar made a single first-class appearance for the side, during the 1985-86 Ranji Trophy season, against Andhra. From the lower order, he scored a single run in the first innings in which he batted, and a duck in the second.

Kumar took a single wicket from nine overs of bowling.
