= Pinchoo Kapoor =

Indian actor

- Born: Lal Pushpendra Kapur; 1927; Rawalpindi, Punjab, British India (Now Punjab, Pakistan)
- Died: 28 April 1989 (aged 61–62); Bombay, Maharashtra, India
- Occupation: Actor
- Years active: 1969–1989

Lal Pushpendra Kapur (1927 – 28 April 1989), better known as Pinchoo Kapoor, was an Indian actor. He was born in Rawalpindi, Punjab, British India in 1927. He acted in many Hindi films during the 1970s and 1980s. His film career lasted from 1969 to 1989. He is best remembered for his role in the films Don, Roti, Avtaar and Khud-Daar.

Kapoor died on 28 April 1989 in Bombay.

== Filmography ==
1958	Yahudi	Roman soldier	
1963	The Householder	Mr Saigal	
1971	Do Boond Pani	Police officer	
1972	Siddhartha	Kamaswami	
1973	Bobby	Mr. Sharma	
1974	Roti	Suraj	
1974	Hamrahi		
1975	Salaakhen	Haridas	
1975	Uljhan	Police Commissioner	
1976	Aadalat	Mr Verma	
1976	Hera Pheri		
1977	Immaan Dharam	Kabir's lawyer	
1977	Guru Manio Granth		Punjabi Movie
1977	Dream Girl (1977 film)	Boss	
1977	Mukti	Vikram's father	
1977	Alibaba Marjinaa	Hakim-e-Allah Afsal Baig	
1978	Damaad	Chaudhary	
1978	Tumhare Liye	Mathadhar	
1978	Bhola Bhala	General Manager	
1978	Don	Interpol Operative R. K. Malik (Real)	
1978	Chakravyuha	Pinto, Garage Owner	
1978	Saajan Bina Suhagan	Judge	
1978	Badalte Rishtey	Colonel	
1979	Duniya Meri Jeb Mein	Thakurdas	
1979	Ratnadeep		
1979	Sunayana	HeeraMohan	
1979	Jhoota Kahin Ka	Jagatnarayan Khanna	
1979	Khandaan	Sandhya's father	
1980	Guest House	Mehra	
1980	Kali Ghata		
1980	Karz	G. G. Oberoi	
1980	The Naxalites		
1981	Commander		
1981	Poonam	Mr Ramnath	
1981	Sannata	Advocate Mehra	
1981	Khuda Kasam	Hotel Customer	
1981	Hotel	Lawyer Kapoor	
1982	Khud-Daar	Varma	
1982	Dial 100	Seth Deendayal	
1982	Kaamchor		
1983	Avtaar	Seth Laxmi Narayan	
1983	Pukar	Kamat	
1984	Sharaabi		
1985	Bahu Ki Awaaz		
1985	Saaheb	Mr. S.P Sinha	
1985	Haqeeqat	Employment Exchange Officer	
1985	Balidaan (1985 film)	Jagmohan	
1986	Aadamkhor		
1986	Ilzaam	Fakirchand	
1986	Aap Ke Saath	Kishorilal Mehta	
1986	Mazloom	Raj Bahadur Arjun Singh	
1986	Aakhri Sanghursh	Patel	This film was supposed to be released in 1986 but was released in 1997
1987	Insaniyat Ke Dushman	Judge	
1987	Pyar Ki Jeet	Sarpanch Chaudhary	
1987	Hukumat	District Magistrate Keshav Lal	
1987	Kachchi Kali		
1987	Mera Yaar Mera Dushman	Jagmohan	
1988	Bees Saal Baad	Police Commissioner	
1988	Tamas	Dilawar	
1988	Sone Pe Suhaaga	Jailor	
1989	Farz Ki Jung	Kulkarni, CBI Officer	
1989	Gair Kanooni	The Judge	
1989	Purani Haveli	Rana Sahab	
1989	Aag Ka Gola	Aarti's Uncle	
1990	Majboor	Judge	
1991	Pucca Badmash	Rai Saab	
1992	Lambu Dada	Ganga Prasad	
