= Uljhan =

- Film Poster
- उलझन
- Directed by: Raghunath Jhalani
- Produced by: Sudesh Kumar
- Starring: Ashok Kumar; Sanjeev Kumar; Sulakshana Pandit; Ranjeet
- Music by: Kalyanji Anandji
- Release date: 1975
- Country: India
- Language: Hindi

Uljhan (Confusion) is a 1975 Hindi suspense thriller film. Produced by Sudesh Kumar and directed by Raghunath Jhalani, it stars Ashok Kumar, Sanjeev Kumar, Asrani, Farida Jalal, Aruna Irani, Sulakshana Pandit, and Ranjeet. The music is by Kalyanji Anandji. It is a remake of 1959 murder mystery Kangan starring Ashok Kumar and Nirupa Roy with a twist about the identity of the killer.

Uljhan was a suspense thriller revolving around a murder investigation conducted by a police officer (Sanjeev Kumar) who doesn't know that the killer is closer to home. The movie marked the acting debut of singer/actor Sulakshana Pandit.

== Cast ==
- Ashok Kumar as Judge Kailash Chandra
- Sanjeev Kumar as Anand K Chandra
- Sulakshana Pandit as Karuna
- Ranjeet as Brijbhushan
- Asrani as Vikram Kapoor
- Farida Jalal as Kamla
- Aruna Irani as Usha Kapoor
- Om Shivpuri as Advocate Mehra
- Pinchoo Kapoor as Police Commissioner Umesh Chandra

== Soundtrack ==
The songs composed by the duo Kalyanji–Anandji were popular in the mid-1970s, especially the title track sung by Kishore Kumar and Lata Mangeshkar.

Kishore also sang a duet with Sulakshana called "Aaj Pyaare Pyaare se Lagte Hain" which was popular. Lyrics made by M.G. Hashmat.

#	Title	Singer(s)	Raga
1	"Apne Jeevan Ki Uljhan Ko"	Kishore Kumar	Ahir Bhairav
2	"Aaj Pyare Pyare Se Lagte Hai Aap"	Kishore Kumar, Sulakshana Pandit	
3	"Apne Jeevan Ki Uljhan Ko"	Lata Mangeshkar	Ahir Bhairav
4	"Subah Aur Sham Kaam Hi Kaam"	Lata Mangeshkar	Kalavati
5	"Mujhko To Qaatil Ki Itni Pehchan Hai"	Mohammed Rafi, Asha Bhosle, Sudesh Kumar	
6	"Bairi Saiyan Ki Nazariya"	Usha Timothy, Kanchan	
