= Tarun Ghosh =

Bangladeshi art director and animation editor (1953–2026)

- তরুন ঘোষ
- Born: 20 August 1953; Rajbari, East Bengal, Pakistan
- Died: 8 April 2026 (aged 72)
- Occupations: Art director; animation editor
- Years active: 2000–2026
- Notable work: Kittonkhola
- Awards: National Film Award (1st time)

Tarun Ghosh (20 August 1953 – 8 April 2026) was a Bangladeshi art director and animation editor. He won Bangladesh National Film Award for Best Art Direction for the film Kittonkhola (2000). Ghosh died on 8 April 2026, at the age of 72, due to a cardiac complication following asthma-related health issues.

== Selected films ==
=== Animation editor ===
- Nirontor – 2006

=== Art director ===
- Kittonkhola – 2000
- Naroshundor – 2009

== Awards and nominations ==
National Film Awards

Year	Award	Category	Film	Result
2000	National Film Award	Best Art Direction	Kittonkhola	Won
