= Kishore Kumar filmography =

The following is the filmography for the Indian film actor, singer, lyricist, composer, producer, director, screenwriter and scriptwriter Kishore Kumar (4 August 1929 – 13 October 1987):

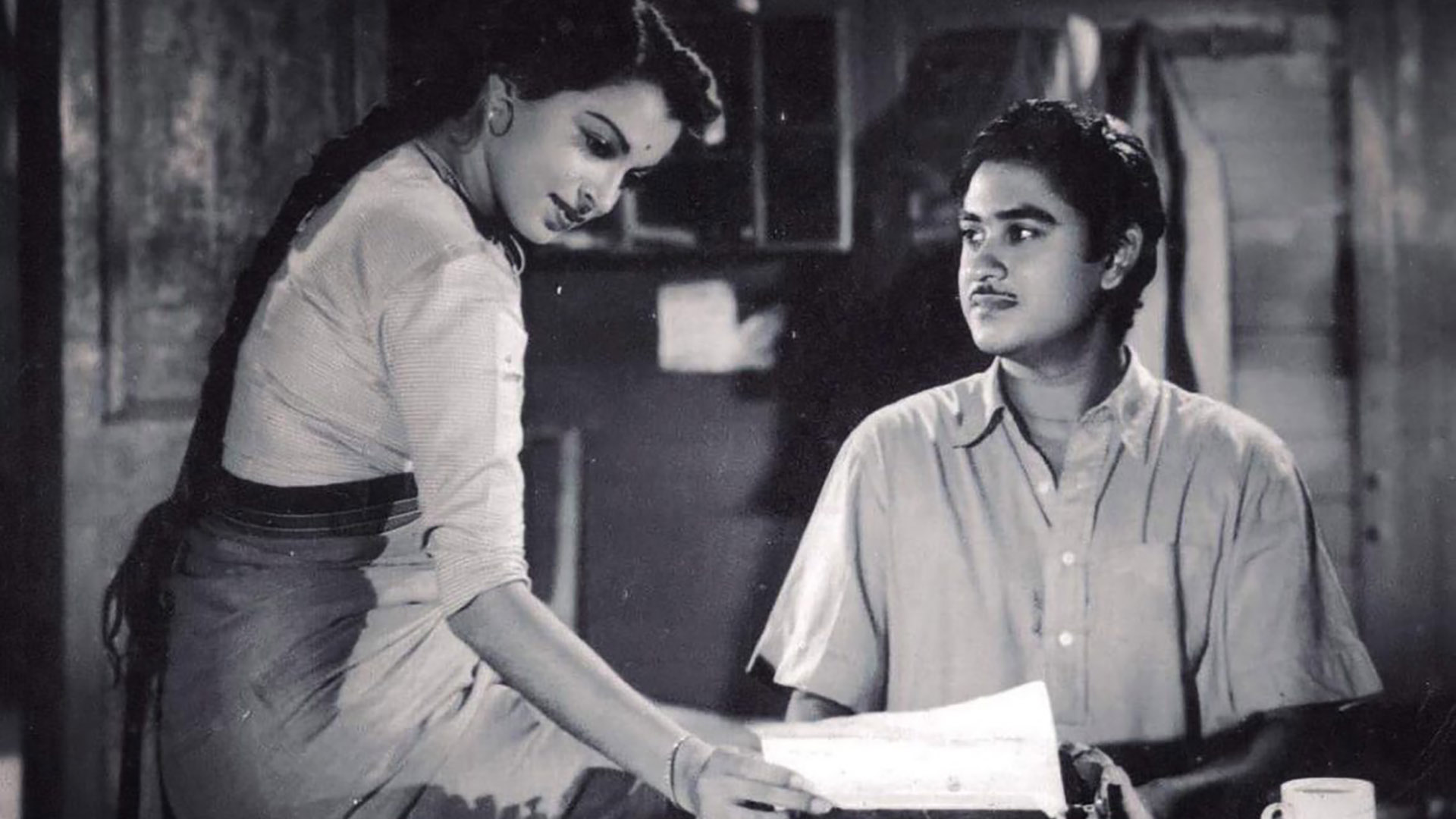
Kishore Kumar in Naukri (1954)

== As an actor ==
=== Hindi films ===
Year	Film	Role	Notes
1946	Shikari		Debut film
1948	Sati Vijaya	Indrajit	Debut as lead actor
1948	Ziddi	Gardener	
1949	Kaneez	Comedian-singer	He featured in the song "Duniya Mein Ameeron Ko Aaram Nahin Milta..." primarily sung by Shiv Dayal Batish, Mohammed Rafi & Kumar where he sung for himself. Kumar improvised the lines that went "bum chik bum chik" & rendered them in a style that became his calling card in the years to come.
1950	Muqaddar		
1951	Andolan	Rattan	
1952	Chham Chhama Chham		
1952	Tamasha	Raju	
1953	Fareb		
1953	Ladki	Kishore	
1953	Lahren		
1954	Adhikar	Shekhar	
1954	Dhobi Doctor	Ramu - Doctor	
1954	Ilzam	Rajan	
1954	Miss Mala	Devendra Arjun	
1954	Naukari	Rattan Kumar Chowdhury	
1954	Pehli Jhalak	Rajan	
1955	Baap Re Baap	Ashok Sagar	
1955	Char Paise	Mohan	
1955	Madh Bhare Nain	Shyam	
1955	Rukhsana		
1956	Aabroo		
1956	Bhagam Bhag	Kishore (Kishu)	
1956	Bhai-Bhai	Raj Kumar (Raja)	
1956	Dhake Ki Malmal	Jeeva	First film opposite his future wife Madhubala
1956	Mem Sahib	Sundar	
1956	Naya Andaz	Chand	
1956	New Delhi	Anand D. Khanna / Anand Kumar Swami	
1956	Paisa Hi Paisa	Kishore	
1956	Parivar	Comedian-singer	Special Appearance
1957	Aasha	Kishore	
1957	Bandi	Madhav Mishra (Madho)	
1957	Begunah		
1957	Miss Mary	Raju	
1957	Musafir	Bhanu	
1958	Chandan	Chandan	
1958	Chalti Ka Naam Gaadi	Manmohan Sharma (Manu)	Also Co-producer
1958	Dilli Ka Thug	Kishore Kumar Sharma	
1958	Kabhi Andhera Kabhi Ujala		
1958	Raagini	Rajan	
1959	Chacha Zindabad	Vinod	
1959	Jaal Saz	Kundan Lal	
1959	Shararat	Chandan alias Deepak	
1960	Apna Haath Jagannath	Madan Malhotra	
1960	Bewaqoof	Kishore Kumar	
1960	Girl Friend		
1960	Mehlon Ke Khwab	Rajan	
1961	Jhumroo	Jhumroo	
1961	Krorepati	Ram / Kishan Lal	
1962	Bombay Ka Chor	Randhir	
1962	Half Ticket	Vijay Chand alias Munna	
1962	Man-Mauji	Raja Lal Bahadur	
1962	Naughty Boy	Preetam	
1962	Rungoli	Kishore Kumar Shastri	
1963	Ek Raaz	Kishore Kumar Verma	
1964	Baghi Shahzada	Firoz	
1964	Daal Mein Kala	Rajendra Kumar (Raju)	
1964	Door Gagan Ki Chhaon Mein	Shankar	Also writer, producer, director, music director & lyricist of a song "Aa Chalke Tujhe..."
1964	Ganga Ki Lahren	Kishore	
1964	Mr. X in Bombay	Sudarshan	
1965	Hum Sab Ustad Hain	Kishore	
1965	Shreeman Funtoosh	Kishore alias Funtoosh	
1966	Akalmand		
1966	Ladka Ladki	Kishore Kumar Khandwawala	In 2024, his dialogue from this film "Chin Tapak Dam Dam" became a trend across social media.
1966	Pyar Kiye Jaa	Shyam	
1967	Albela Mastana	Dayal Verma	
1967	Duniya Nachegi	Ramdeen Bagla	
1967	Hum Do Daaku		Also Director
1968	Do Dooni Chaar	Sandeep	Dual Role
1968	Haye Mera Dil	Deepak	
1968	Padosan	Vidyapati alias Guru	
1968	Payal Ki Jhankar	Shyam (Shammi)	
1968	Sadhu Aur Shaitaan	Deena Nath Shastri	
1968	Shrimanji	Kishore Gupta/ Miss Franco	
1970	Aansoo Aur Muskan	Pandit	Special Appearance
1971	Door Ka Raahi	Prashant	
1971	Hungama	Gareebchand	Special Appearance
1971	Main Sundar Hoon	Himself	Himself recording the song "Naach Meri Jaan Fatafat..." (cameo)
1972	Bombay To Goa	Himself	Cameo
1972	Pyar Diwana	Sunil	
1974	Badhti Ka Naam Dadhi		
1978	Ek Baap Chhe Bete		Special Appearance
1979	Shabhash Daddy		Also director
1981	Chalti Ka Naam Zindagi		
1982	Door Waadiyon Mein Kahin		
1987	Kaun Jeeta Kaun Haara		
1989	Mamta Ki Chhaon Mein		Kishore directed the film, but died in 1987 and Rajesh Khanna helped Amit Kumar in releasing the film in 1989.
2013	Love in Bombay	Ganpat Rao	The film was originally made in 1971.

=== Bengali films ===
Year	Film	Role(s)	Notes
1958	Lukochuri	Kumar & Shankar	First Bengali film as an actor. Also Co-producer. Double-role
1961	Maddhya Raater Tara		
1965	Ektuku Chhoan Laage	Kanu	
1967	Dushtu Prajapati		

== As playback singer ==
Kishore Kumar sang in 1,200 films, a total number of 2678 Hindi songs including his released, unreleased and short songs.

=== 1946 to 1960 ===
1946 to 1960
Movie	Year of release	Number of songs
Eight Days	1946	1
Non Film	1946	1
Non Film	1947	1
Sati Vijaya	1948	1
Ziddi	1948	2
Kaneez	1949	1
Pandrah August Ki Punyatithi	1949	2
Rimjhim	1949	3
Hamara Ghar	1950	1
Khiladi	1950	1
Muqaddar	1950	4
Pyar	1950	5
Adaa	1951	2
Andolan	1951	1
Baazi	1951	1
Bahar	1951	1
Ek Nazar	1951	1
Hamari Shaan	1951	2
Naujawan	1951	2
Aashiana	1952	1
Chham Chhama Chham	1952	7
Jaal	1952	1
Kaafila	1952	2
Maa	1952	1
Najariya	1952	4
Rangeeli	1952	1
Saloni	1952	1
Sheesham	1952	1
Shin Shinaki Babla Boo	1952	1
Shrimati Ji	1952	3
Sindbad the Sailor	1952	1
Tamasha	1952	1
Aabshar	1953	1
Aagosh	1953	1
Fareb	1953	3
Humsafar	1953	2
Ladki	1953	1
Lehrein	1953	1
Maalkin	1953	5
Manchala	1953	1
Mashuqa	1953	1
Naulakha Haar	1953	1
Parineeta	1953	1
Shamsher	1953	1
Adhikaar	1954	3
Angaarey	1954	1
Chalis Baba Ek Chor	1954	1
Dhobi Doctor	1954	1
Ilzaam	1954	3
Mastana	1954	2
Miss Mala	1954	4
Naukri	1954	3
Parichay	1954	1
Pehli Jhalak	1954	1
Pehli Tareekh	1954	1
Taxi Driver	1954	1
Baap Re Baap	1955	3
Char Paise	1955	1
House No. 44	1955	1
Joru Ka Bhai	1955	4
Madhbhare Nain	1955	2
Munimji	1955	1
Rajdarbar	1955	1
Rukhsana	1955	2
Aabroo	1956	1
Awaaz	1956	1
Bhagam Bhag	1956	2
Bhai Bhai	1956	2
Dhake Ki Malmal	1956	1
Fifty Fifty	1956	2
Funtoosh	1956	6
Mem Sahib	1956	1
Naya Andaz	1956	8
New Delhi	1956	3
Paisa Hi Paisa	1956	7
Parivar	1956	2
Aasha	1957	3
Bandi	1957	3
Begunah	1957	2
Miss Mary	1957	1
Musafir	1957	1
Nau Do Gyarah	1957	2
Paying Guest	1957	4
Chalta Purza	1958	1
Chalti Ka Naam Gaadi	1958	6
Chandan	1958	1
Dilli Ka Thug	1958	3
Kabhi Andhera Kabhi Ujala	1958	2
Ragini	1958	4
Chacha Zindabad	1959	4
Jaalsaaz	1959	7
Shararat	1959	4
Suhana Geet	1959	8
Apna Haath Jagannath	1960	5
Bewqoof	1960	4
Girl Friend	1960	7
Gun Fight	1960	1
Maa	1960	3
Mehlon Ke Khwab	1960	4
Neela Aasmaan	1960	4

=== 1961 to 1970 ===
1961 to 1970
Movie	Year of release	Number of songs
Jhumroo	1961	11
Karorepati	1961	4
Bombay Ka Chor	1962	8
Half Ticket	1962	7
Man-Mauji	1962	3
Naughty Boy	1962	6
Rangoli	1962	4
Ek Raaz	1963	5
Baghi Shehzada	1964	3
Daal Me Kala	1964	4
Door Gagan Ki Chhaon Mein	1964	4
Ganga Ki Lahren	1964	4
Mr. X in Bombay	1964	5
Bhoot Bungla	1965	2
Guide	1965	1
Hum Sab Ustad Hain	1965	4
Johar-Mehmood in Goa	1965	1
Shreeman Funtoosh	1965	4
Teen Devian	1965	4
Akalmand	1966	4
Ladka Ladki	1966	3
Pyar Kiye Ja	1966	3
Albela Mastana	1967	2
Duniya Nachegi	1967	2
Hum Do Daku	1967	5
Jewel Thief	1967	2
Abhilasha	1968	1
Do Dooni Char	1968	2
Duniya	1968	1
Farishta	1968	1
Haye Mera Dil	1968	3
Padosan	1968	5
Payal Ki Jhankar	1968	4
Ramdoot Hanuman	1968	1
Shrimaanji	1968	4
Suhaag Raat	1968	1
Teen Bahuraniyan	1968	1
Aansoo Ban Gaye Phool	1969	4
Aradhana	1969	3
Bhai Behen	1969	1
Do Raaste	1969	1
Jyoti	1969	1
Khamoshi	1969	1
Mahal	1969	3
Nanha Farishta	1969	1
Paisa Ya Pyar	1969	1
Pyar Ka Mausam	1969	2
Rahgir	1969	2
Satyakam	1969	1
Aan Milo Sajna	1970	2
Aansoo Aur Muskan	1970	1
Abhinetri	1970	1
Bachpan	1970	1
Bombay Talkie	1970	1
Darpan	1970	2
Deedar	1970	2
Ehsaan	1970	1
Ghar Ghar Ki Kahani	1970	2
Hamara Adhikar	1970	1
Holi Aayi Re	1970	1
Humjoli	1970	2
Jawab	1970	2
Johny Mera Naam	1970	3
Kati Patang	1970	4
Khilona	1970	1
Mastana	1970	3
Pavitra Papi	1970	1
Prem Pujari	1970	3
Rootha Na Karo	1970	2
Saas Bhi Kabhi Bahu Thi	1970	4
Sachcha Jhutha	1970	3
Safar	1970	2
Tum Haseen Main Jawan	1970	1
Umang	1970	4

=== 1971 to 1980 ===
1971 to 1980
Movie	Year of release	Number of songs
Aap Aye Bahaar Ayee	1971	1
Adhikar	1971	1
Aisa Bhi Hota Hai	1971	1
Albela	1971	4
Andaaz	1971	2
Banphool	1971	2
Buddha Mil Gaya	1971	2
Caravan	1971	1
Chhoti Bahu	1971	1
Door Ka Raahi	1971	8
Duniya Kya Jane	1971	2
Ek Nari Ek Brahmachari	1971	3
Gambler	1971	4
Haathi Mere Saathi	1971	5
Hare Rama Hare Krishna	1971	3
Hum Tum Aur Woh	1971	2
Hungama	1971	1
Jaane Anjane	1971	1
Jai Bangladesh	1971	1
Kahin Aar Kahin Paar	1971	1
Kal Aaj Aur Kal	1971	4
Kathputli	1971	2
Khoj	1971	2
Lakhon Mein Ek	1971	2
Lal Patthar	1971	1
Main Sunder Hoon	1971	3
Man Mandir	1971	2
Maryada	1971	3
Mehboob Ki Mehndi	1971	1
Mere Apne	1971	2
Mere Jeevan Saathi	1971	6
Nagina	1971	1
Naya Zamana	1971	2
Paras	1971	1
Paraya Dhan	1971	4
Parde Ke Peechey	1971	2
Parwana	1971	2
Preet Ki Dori	1971	1
Pyar Ki Kahani	1971	2
Saaz Aur Sanam	1971	2
Sansaar	1971	4
Seema	1971	3
Sharmeelee	1971	4
tere Mere Sapne	1971	3
Woh Din Yaad Karo	1971	1
Aankh Micholi	1972	3
Aankhon Aankhon Mein	1972	4
Amar Prem	1972	3
Annadata	1972	2
Anokha Daan	1972	2
Apna Desh	1972	3
Apradh	1972	3
Babul Ki Galiyaan	1972	1
Bandagi	1972	4
Bawarchi	1972	1
Bees Saal Pehle	1972	2
Be-Imaan	1972	1
Bhai Ho To Aisa	1972	2
Bombay To Goa	1972	4
Buniyaad	1972	3
Dharkan	1972	5
Dil Daulat Duniya	1972	4
Do Bachche Dus Haath	1972	2
Do Chor	1972	3
Doctor X	1972	1
Double Cross	1972	5
Dushman	1972	2
Ek Bar Mooskura Do	1972	5
Ek Hasina Do Diwane	1972	1
Ek Nazar	1972	1
Gomti Ke Kinare	1972	2
Haar Jeet	1972	1
Intezar	1972	2
Jaanwar Aur Insaan	1972	3
Jangal Mein Mangal	1972	3
Jawani Diwani	1972	5
Joroo Ka Ghulam	1972	4
Maalik	1972	1
Man Jaiye	1972	1
Manavta	1972	3
Munimji	1972	1
Naag Panchami	1972	2
Parchhaiyan	1972	2
Parichay	1972	2
Parivartan	1972	2
Piya Ka Ghar	1972	2
Putlibai	1972	2
Pyar Diwana	1972	3
Raja Jani	1972	1
Rakhi Aur Hathkadi	1972	2
Raampur Ka Lakshman	1972	5
Rivaaz	1972	1
Roop Tera Mastana	1972	1
Rut Rangeeli Ayee	1972	1
Sa Re Ga Ma Pa	1972	1
Sab Ka Saathi	1972	1
Samadhi	1972	2
Sanjog	1972	2
Savera	1972	1
Seeta Aur Geeta	1972	2
Shehzaada	1972	4
Subah-O-Shaam	1972	1
Tanhayi	1972	1
Wafaa	1972	4
Yeh Gulistan Hamara	1972	2
Zameen Aasmaan	1972	3
Zindagi Zindagi	1972	3
Aa Gale Lag Ja	1973	6
Aaj Ki Taza Khabar	1973	3
Abhimaan	1973	3
Anamika	1973	1
Anhonee	1973	1
Anokhi Ada	1973	2
Anuraag	1973	1
Bada Kabutar	1973	1
Banarasi Babu	1973	5
bandhe Haath	1973	1
Bazaar Band Karo	1973	1
Blackmail	1973	3
Chalaak	1973	2
Chhalia	1973	1
Chupa Rustam	1973	3
Daag	1973	3
Dhamkee	1973	2
Do Phool	1973	2
Ek Kunwari Ek Kunwara	1973	2
Ek Mutthi Aasman	1973	2
Ek Nari Do Roop	1973	1
Gai Aur Gori	1973	2
Garibi Hatao	1973	3
Gehri Chaal	1973	2
Ghulam Beghum Baadshah	1973	1
Heera	1973	1
Heera Panna	1973	4
Hifajat	1973	1
Honeymoon	1973	3
Insaaf	1973	2
Jaise Ko Taisa	1973	5
Jeevan Sukh	1973	1
Jheel Ke Us Paar	1973	1
Joshila	1973	3
Jugnu	1973	3
Jwar Bhata	1973	3
Kahani Kismat Ki	1973	3
Kashmkash	1973	1
Keemat	1973	2
Khoon Khoon	1973	1
Kunwara Badan	1973	1
Manchali	1973	3
Nafrat	1973	2
Naina	1973	1
Namak Haraam	1973	4
Nanha Shikari	1973	2
Naya Nasha	1973	1
Nirdosh	1973	1
Phagun	1973	2
Pyar Ka Rishta	1973	1
Raja Rani	1973	1
Rani Aur Jaani	1973	2
Rickshawala	1973	3
Samjhauta	1973	3
Saudagar	1973	1
Shareef Badmaash	1973	3
Teen Chor/Malik Tere Bande Hum	1973	1
Tu Meri Main Tera	1973	2
Victoria No. 203	1973	3
Yaadon Ki Baaraat	1973	4
Yauwan	1973	1
36 Ghante	1974	2
5 Rifles	1974	4
Aap Ki Kasam	1974	5
Aarop	1974	1
Ajnabi	1974	4
Amir Garib	1974	5
Ang Se Ang Laga Le	1974	2
Anjaan Rahen	1974	1
Badhti Ka Naam Dadhi	1974	8
Badla	1974	1
Bidaai	1974	2
Call Girl	1974	3
Charitraheen	1974	1
Chattan Singh	1974	1
Chor Machaye Shor	1974	2
Dil Diwana	1974	6
Do Number Ke Ameer	1974	1
Dost	1974	1
Farebi/The Cheat	1974	1
Goonj	1974	1
Haath Ki Safai	1974	2
Humshakal	1974	4
Imaan	1974	1
Imtihaan	1974	1
International Crook	1974	2
Ishq Ishq Ishq	1974	7
Jurm Aur Saza	1974	1
Kasauti	1974	2
Khoon Ki Keemat	1974	2
Khote Sikke	1974	1
Kisan Aur Bhagwan	1974	1
Kora Kagaz	1974	1
Kshitij	1974	1
Kunwara Baap	1974	4
Maa Behen Aur Biwi	1974	1
Madhosh	1974	2
Majboor	1974	3
Manoranjan	1974	2
Mr. Romeo	1974	5
Naya Din Nayi Raat	1974	1
Nirmaan	1974	1
Paap Aur Punya	1974	1
Paise Ki Gudiya	1974	1
Phir Kab Milogi	1974	1
Prem Nagar	1974	6
Prem Shastra	1974	3
Raja Kaka	1974	2
Resham Ki Dori	1974	1
Roti	1974	4
Sagina	1974	4
Shaandar	1974	2
Shubh Din	1974	3
Trimurthi	1974	3
Ujala Hi Ujala	1974	2
Unknown	1974	1
Vachan	1974	4
Woh Main Nahin	1974	2
Zehreela Insaan	1974	2
Aakhiri Dao	1975	1
Aakraman	1975	5
Aandhi	1975	4
Amanush	1975	4
Anari	1975	2
Andhera	1975	2
Anokha	1975	2
Apne Rang Hazaar	1975	1
Chori Mera Kaam	1975	4
Chupke Chupke	1975	1
Dafaa 302	1975	2
Deewaar	1975	2
Dharam Karam	1975	5
Dharmatma	1975	1
Do Jhooth	1975	2
Do Ladkiya	1975	1
Do Thug	1975	1
Dulhan	1975	1
Ek Gaon Ki Kahani	1975	2
Ek Hans Ka Joda	1975	3
Ek Mahal Ho Sapno Ka	1975	4
Faraar	1975	3
Ganga Ki Kasam	1975	4
Geet Gata Chal	1975	1
Jooli	1975	2
Kala Sona	1975	1
Kehte Hain Mujhko Raja	1975	3
Khel Khel Mein	1975	3
Khushboo	1975	2
Lafange	1975	1
Mere Sajna	1975	1
Mili	1975	2
Nagin	1975	1
Ponga Pandit	1975	4
Prem Kahani	1975	2
Qaid	1975	2
Raja	1975	3
Salakhein	1975	1
Sholay	1975	5
Sunehara Sansar	1975	1
Uljhan	1975	2
Warrant	1975	3
Zakhmee	1975	3
Zameer	1975	6
Zinda Dil	1975	1
Zorro	1975	1
Aaj Ka Mahatma	1976	2
Aaj Ka Yeh Ghar	1976	2
Aap Beati	1976	3
Angaarey	1976	1
Arjun Pandit	1976	1
Balika Vadhu	1976	1
Barood	1976	2
Bhala Manas	1976	1
Bhanwar	1976	5
Bhoola Bhatka	1976	1
Bullet	1976	2
Bundal Baaz	1976	3
Chalte Chalte	1976	2
Charas	1976	1
Deewangi	1976	4
Do Anjane	1976	2
Do Khiladi	1976	1
Doosra Aadmi	1976	5
Ek Se Badhkar Ek	1976	1
Fakira	1976	3
Ginny Aur Johney	1976	6
Gumrah	1976	2
Harfanmaula	1976	1
Jaaneman	1976	3
Jeevan Jyoti	1976	2
Kabeela	1976	2
Kabhi Kabhi	1976	3
Kalicharan	1976	1
Khalifa	1976	3
Khan Dost	1976	2
Koi Jeeta Koi Hara	1976	3
Maa	1976	1
Mahachor	1976	4
Mehbooba	1976	3
Mera Jeevan	1976	1
Nehle Pe Dehla	1976	2
Raees	1976	1
Rangila Ratan	1976	3
Sabse Bada Rupayya	1976	2
Sangram	1976	1
Sankoch	1976	3
Santan	1976	1
Shankar Shambhu	1976	1
Tapasya	1976	2
Udhaar Ka Sindoor	1976	1
Vishwasghat	1976	1
Zamane Se Poocho	1976	1
Zindagi	1976	3
Aadha Din Aadhi Raat	1977	2
Aafat	1977	1
Aakhiri Goli	1977	1
Aanand Aashram	1977	3
Aap Ki Khatir	1977	1
Aashiq Hu Baharon Ka	1977	4
Abhi To Jee Lein	1977	6
Agent Vinod	1977	1
Amar Akbar Anthony	1977	4
Anurodh	1977	4
Apnapan	1977	2
Chacha Bhatija	1977	1
Chailla Babu	1977	5
Chakkar Pe Chakkar	1977	2
Chala Murari Hero Ban Ne	1977	2
Chalta Purza	1977	3
Chalu Mera Naam	1977	2
Chandi Sona	1977	3
Charandas	1977	1
Chor Sipahi	1977	3
Chota Baap	1977	1
Darinda	1977	2
Darling Darling	1977	6
Dharamveer	1977	1
Dildaar	1977	5
Dream Girl	1977	2
Duniyadari	1977	1
Ek Hi Raasta	1977	2
Farishta Ya Qatil	1977	1
Haiwan	1977	1
Hatyara	1977	1
Heera Aur Patthar	1977	2
Hera Pheri	1977	2
Hum Kisi Se Kam Nahi	1977	4
Imaan Dharam	1977	2
Inkaar	1977	1
Kachcha Chor	1977	1
Kalabaaz	1977	3
Kali Raat	1977	1
Karm	1977	3
Kasam Khoon Ki	1977	4
Khel Khilari Ka	1977	2
Khel Kismat Ka	1977	2
Khoon Pasina	1977	2
Kinara	1977	1
Ladki Jawan Ho Gayi	1977	1
Mama Bhanja	1977	1
Mandir Maszid	1977	1
Meri Dosti Tera Pyar	1977	1
Mukti	1977	1
Naami Chor	1977	1
Palkon Ki Chao Me	1977	3
Parvarish	1977	3
Phir Janam Lenge Hum	1977	2
Priyatama	1977	2
Ram Bharose	1977	3
Saheb Bahadur	1977	4
Swami	1977	1
Taxi Taxie	1977	1
Tinku	1977	2
Tyaag	1977	4
Yaaron Ka Yaar	1977	1
Yehi Hai Zindagi	1977	2
Zamanat	1977	1
Aahuti	1978	3
Aakhiri Daku	1978	1
Aar Paar	1978	1
Aawara Raju/Kharidar	1978	1
Aazad	1978	3
Amar Shakti	1978	2
Anjane Mein	1978	4
Anpadh	1978	3
Atithi	1978	4
Badaltey Rishtey	1978	3
Band Master Chik Chik Boom (Band Leader)	1978	3
Bebus	1978	2
Bhola Bhala	1978	4
Chakravyuh	1978	1
Chor Ho To Aisa	1978	1
College Girl	1978	2
Daaku Aur Jawan	1978	1
Daan Dahej	1978	2
Des Pardes	1978	5
Devata	1978	2
Dil Aur Deewar	1978	2
Dil Se Mile Dil	1978	2
Dillagi	1978	2
Do Musafir	1978	3
Don	1978	4
Ek Baap Cheh Bete	1978	2
Ganga Ki Saugandh	1978	2
Ghar	1978	3
Heeralal Pannalal	1978	4
Jalan	1978	1
Jeb Tumhari Haath Hamare	1978	1
Karmyogi	1978	1
Kasme Vaade	1978	4
Khatta Meetha	1978	5
Khoon Ki Pukar	1978	2
Lal Kothi	1978	1
Mr. Hasmukh	1978	1
Muqaddar	1978	3
Muqaddar Ka Sikandar	1978	4
Nalayak	1978	2
Nasbandi	1978	2
Naukri	1978	1
Naya Daur	1978	3
Pati Patni Aur Woh	1978	1
Phandebaaz	1978	1
Phool Khile Hain Gulshan Gulshan	1978	3
Sawan Ke Geet	1978	2
Shalimaar	1978	3
Swarg Narak	1978	2
Toote Khilone	1978	2
Trishna	1978	1
Trishul	1978	4
Tumhari Kasam	1978	3
Vishwanath	1978	2
Waapsi	1978	1
Aaj Ki Dhara	1979	1
Aangan Ki Kali	1979	2
Aap Ke Deewane	1979	4
Aatmaram	1979	2
Ahsaas	1979	4
Amardeep	1979	3
Aur Kaun	1979	1
Bagula Bhagat	1979	3
Bandi	1979	3
Baton Baton Mein	1979	2
Bin Phere Hum Tere	1979	1
Bombay by Nite	1979	1
Dhongi	1979	4
Do Hawaldaar	1979	1
Do Shikari	1979	1
Duniya Meri Zeb Me	1979	4
Ganga Aur Geeta	1979	1
Gautam Govinda	1979	2
Golmaal	1979	2
Habari	1979	1
Hamare Tumhare	1979	6
Hum Tere Aashiq Hai	1979	2
Jaan E Bahar	1979	1
Jaandaar	1979	1
Jaani Dushman	1979	2
Jhootha Kahin Ka	1979	4
Kala Patthar	1979	1
Khandan	1979	2
Lahoo Ke Do Rang	1979	3
Lok Parlok	1979	5
Magroor	1979	1
Manzil	1979	2
Mr Natwarlal	1979	1
Muqabla	1979	2
Naukar	1979	2
Naya Bakra	1979	1
Oh Bewafa	1979	1
Pehredaar	1979	1
Prem Bandhan	1979	2
Prem Vivah	1979	1
Ratandeep	1979	1
Salaam Memsahab	1979	3
Shabash Daddy	1979	4
Suraksha	1979	2
The Burning Train	1979	2
The Great Gambler	1979	1
Yuvraj	1979	1
Aanchal	1980	4
Aap To Aise Na The	1980	1
Abdullah	1980	1
Agent 009	1980	1
Alibaba Aur Chalis Chor	1980	1
Apne Paraye	1980	1
Bambai Ka Maharaja	1980	3
Bandish	1980	3
Bombay 405 Miles	1980	2
Bulandi	1980	2
Choron Ki Baarat	1980	1
Chunauti	1980	1
Dhan Daulat	1980	4
Do Aur Do Paanch	1980	4
Do Premi	1980	2
Dostana	1980	4
Garam Khoon	1980	1
Gehrayi	1980	1
Gunehgaar	1980	1
Hum Nahin Sudhrenge	1980	2
Hum Paanch	1980	1
Judaai	1980	3
Jwalamukhi	1980	4
Jyoti Bane Jwala	1980	2
Karz	1980	5
Kashish	1980	1
Katil Kaun	1980	3
Katilon Ke Katil	1980	2
Khwaish	1980	1
Kismat	1980	1
Laathi	1980	2
Lootmaar	1980	3
Maang Bharo Sajna	1980	3
Manpasand	1980	3
Neeyat	1980	3
Nishana	1980	4
Patita	1980	2
Phir Wohi Raat	1980	3
Pratishodh	1980	2
Pyar Ajnabi Hai	1980	3
Pyar To Hona Hi Tha	1980	1
Pyara Dushman	1980	4
Qurbani	1980	1
Ram Balram	1980	3
Ramu Tu Diwana Hai	1980	2
Red Rose	1980	2
Saboot	1980	2
Shaan	1980	2
Swayamvar	1980	3
Takkar	1980	3
Taxi Chor	1980	3
Thodi Si Bewafai	1980	3
Yaari Dushmani	1980	1
Yeh Kaisa Insaaf	1980	2
Zaalim	1980	2

=== 1981 to 2013 ===
1981 to 2013
Movie	Year of release	Number of songs
Aapas Ki Baat	1981	2
Aas Paas	1981	1
Agni Pareeksha	1981	1
Armaan	1981	2
Bade Miyan	1981	3
Barsaat Ki Ek Raat	1981	3
Baseraa	1981	1
Bharosa	1981	2
Biwi-O-Biwi	1981	6
Chalti Ka Naam Zindagi	1981	6
Commander	1981	1
Daasi	1981	1
Dard	1981	3
Dahshat	1981	1
Dhanwan	1981	2
Dushman Dost	1981	2
Ek Aur Ek Gyarah	1981	3
Fiffty Fiffty	1981	3
Gehra Zakham	1981	2
Ghungroo Ki Awaaz	1981	2
Hari Naam Ka Pyala	1981	1
Harjaee	1981	5
Hum Se Badhkar Kaun	1981	1
Itni Si Baat	1981	3
Jail Yatra	1981	2
Jeene Ki Arzoo	1981	1
Josh	1981	1
Jyoti	1981	1
Kaalia	1981	3
Kaaran	1981	1
Kahani Ek Chor Ki	1981	2
Khara Khota	1981	1
Khoon Aur Paani	1981	2
Khoon Ka Rishta	1981	2
Kranti	1981	1
Krodhi	1981	1
Kudrat	1981	2
Laawaris	1981	4
Laparwah	1981	2
Ladaaku	1981	1
Main Aur Mera Haathi	1981	3
Mehfil	1981	1
Meri Aawaz Suno	1981	2
Naari	1981	1
Naseeb	1981	2
Nazrana Pyar Ka	1981	2
Paanch Qaidi	1981	2
Professor Pyarelal	1981	1
Pyar Ki Manzil	1981	1
Pyaasa Sawan	1981	2
Rocky	1981	5
Sahara	1981	3
Shakka	1981	1
Silsila	1981	3
Titlee	1981	2
Waqt Ki Deewar	1981	3
Yaarana	1981	5
Amne Samne	1982	2
Apna Bana Lo	1982	2
Ashanti	1982	1
Badle Ki Aag	1982	1
Barrister	1982	1
Bemisal	1982	3
Bezubaan	1982	3
Bhagya	1982	2
Bheegi Palkein	1982	1
Chorni	1982	2
Dard Ka Rishta	1982	2
Daulat	1982	2
Deedar-E-Yaar	1982	3
Desh Premee	1982	2
Dial 100	1982	4
Dil-E-Nadaan	1982	3
Disco Dancer	1982	1
Door Wadiyon Me Kahin	1982	1
Dulha Bikta Hai	1982	1
Eent Ka Jawab Patthar	1982	2
Farz Aur Kaanoon	1982	2
Geet Ganga	1982	1
Ghazab	1982	2
Gul-E-Bakwali	1982	2
Gumsoom	1982	1
Hamari Bahu Alka	1982	1
Haathkadi	1982	3
Paagal Premee	1982	2
Insaan	1982	1
Jaanwar	1982	4
Jeevan Dhara	1982	1
Johny I Love You	1982	3
Jwala Dahej Ki	1982	1
Kaamchor	1982	5
Kachche Heere	1982	1
Khud-daar	1982	6
Main Intaquam Loonga	1982	3
Meharbaani	1982	1
Mehndi Rang Layegi	1982	1
Namak Halaal	1982	3
Namkeen	1982	1
Patthar Ki Lakeer	1982	3
Pyar Me Sauda Nahin	1982	2
Raaj Mahal	1982	1
Rajput	1982	1
Raaste Pyar Ke	1982	3
Raksha	1982	3
Samraat	1982	3
Sanam Teri Kasam	1982	3
Sapnon Ki Manzil	1982	2
Satte Pe Satta	1982	6
Sawaal	1982	3
Shakti	1982	1
Shaukeen	1982	1
Shiv Charan	1982	1
Shriman Shrimati	1982	4
Sugandh	1982	2
Suraag	1982	2
Swami Dada	1982	5
Taaqat	1982	2
Teesri Ankh	1982	2
Vidhaata	1982	1
Waqt Ke Shehzade	1982	2
Waqt Waqt Ki Baat	1982	3
Yeh Vaada Raha	1982	5
Pyaas	1982	4
Aao Baby Pyar Karein	1983	3
Ab Meri Baari	1983	1
Agar Tum Na Hote	1983	3
Andhaa Kaanoon	1983	4
Arpan	1983	1
Avtaar	1983	3
Bade Dilwala	1983	5
Bandhan Kachche Dhagon Ka	1983	2
Bekaraar	1983	2
Bekhabar	1983	1
Chatpatee	1983	1
Chor Mandali	1983	1
Darpok	1983	3
Daulat Ke Dushman	1983	5
Do Gulaab	1983	3
Doosri Dulhan	1983	1
Ek Jaan Hain Hum	1983	1
Faraib	1983	3
Film Hi Film	1983	1
Haadsaa	1983	2
Himmatwala	1983	4
Hum Se Hai Zamana	1983	2
Hum Se Na Jeeta Koi	1983	3
Jaane Jaan	1983	4
Jaani Dost	1983	5
Jeena Hai Pyar Me	1983	4
Jeet Hamaari	1983	1
Justice Chaudhury	1983	6
Grahasti	1983	1
Kalaakaar	1983	3
Kalyug Ki Sita	1983	1
Karate	1983	2
Katha	1983	1
Kaun? Kaisey?	1983	2
Keh Do Pyar Hai	1983	1
Khushi	1983	1
Laalach	1983	3
Log Kya Kahenge	1983	2
Mahaan	1983	5
Main Awara Hoon	1983	4
Mangal Pandey	1983	1
Mawaali	1983	5
Mehndi	1983	1
Mujhe Vachan Do	1983	3
Nastik	1983	2
Naukar Biwi Ka	1983	3
Nishaan	1983	5
Painter Babu	1983	1
Pakhandee	1983	1
Prem Tapasya	1983	3
Pukar	1983	2
Pyasi Aankhen	1983	3
Rishta Kagaz Ka	1983	2
Siskiyan	1983	3
Souten	1983	4
sweekaar Kiya Maine	1983	2
Taqdeer	1983	2
Woh Jo Hasina	1983	2
Woh Saat Din	1983	1
Zara Si Zindagi	1983	1
Aaj Ka MLA Ram Avtar	1984	3
Aan Aur Shaan	1984	2
Anand Aur Anand	1984	4
Aao Jao Ghar Tumhara/Tu Hi Tu	1984	1
Asha Jyoti	1984	3
Aasmaan	1984	5
Ab Ayega Maja	1984	2
Akalmand	1984	3
All Rounder	1984	1
Amber	1984	2
Awaaz	1984	5
Baazi	1984	3
Bandh Honth	1984	1
Boxer	1984	2
Dharm Aur Qanoon	1984	2
Dilawar	1984	1
Duniya	1984	5
Farishta	1984	1
Gangvaa	1984	1
Ghar Ek Mandir	1984	2
Haisiyat	1984	3
Hanste Khelte	1984	2
Hum Dono	1984	3
Hum Hain Lajawab	1984	2
Hum Rahe Na Hum	1984	3
Inquilaab	1984	5
Inteha	1984	2
Jaag Utha Insan	1984	2
Jagir	1984	4
Jeevan Sandhya	1984	1
Jhutha Sach	1984	2
Kaamyab	1984	4
Karishmaa	1984	3
Laila	1984	2
Love Marriage	1984	1
Maqsad	1984	5
Mashaal	1984	3
Meraa Dost Meraa Dushman	1984	2
Meri Adalat	1984	1
Mujhe Shaktee Do	1984	1
Naya Kadam	1984	3
Papi Pet Ka Sawal Hai	1984	3
Pet Pyar Aur Paap	1984	1
Qaidi	1984	4
Raaj Tilak	1984	2
Raja Aur Rana	1984	1
Ram Ki Ganga	1984	1
Sasural	1984	2
Sharaabi	1984	5
Tarkeeb	1984	2
Teri Baahon Mein	1984	1
Tohfa	1984	4
Unchi Udaan	1984	1
Wanted	1984	2
Yaadgaar	1984	3
Yadoon Ki Zanjeer	1984	1
Yeh Desh	1984	1
Yeh Jo Hai Zindagi	1984	1
Zakhmi Sher	1984	1
Zameen Aasmaan	1984	2
Zindagi Jeene Ke Liye	1984	4
3D Saamri	1985	1
Aaj Ka Daur	1985	3
Aandhi-Toofan	1985	1
Aar Paar	1985	3
Alag Alag	1985	5
Ameer Aadmi Gareeb Aadmi	1985	1
Awara Baap	1985	3
Babu	1985	3
Baadal	1985	1
Balidaan	1985	3
Bayen Haath Ka Khel	1985	3
Bepanaah	1985	2
Bewafai	1985	2
Bond 303	1985	3
Dharam Shatru	1985	1
Ek Daku Sheher Mein	1985	2
Ek Se Bhale Do	1985	3
Faasle	1985	4
Ghar Dwaar	1985	1
Geraftaar	1985	2
Haqeeqat	1985	1
Hoshiyar	1985	3
Hum Naujawan	1985	1
Insaaf Main Karoongaa	1985	2
Jaan Ki Baazi	1985	1
Jab Pyar Hua	1985	1
Jhoothi	1985	1
Lallu Ram	1985	1
Lava	1985	3
Lover Boy	1985	5
Mahaguru	1985	1
Masterji	1985	4
Mera Saathi	1985	3
Meri Jung	1985	1
Mohabbat	1985	4
Oonche Log	1985	4
Paisa Yeh Paisa	1985	1
Pataal Bhairavi	1985	3
Pighalta Aasman	1985	1
Pyari Behna	1985	3
Rahi Badal Gaye	1985	3
Ram Tere Kitne Nam	1985	2
Rusvai	1985	1
Saagar	1985	4
Saaheb	1985	2
Sanjog	1985	1
Sarfarosh	1985	2
Sautela Pati	1985	1
Shiva Ka Insaaf	1985	1
Sitamgar	1985	6
Surkhiyan	1985	3
Telephone	1985	1
Ulta Seedha	1985	4
Wafadaar	1985	2
Yudh	1985	1
Zabardast	1985	4
Zamana	1985	3
Adhikar	1986	3
Amrit	1986	1
Angaarey	1986	1
Avinash	1986	1
Baat Ban Jaye	1986	2
Begaana	1986	4
Bhagwaan Dada	1986	3
Chameli Ki Shaadi	1986	1
Chhota Aadmi	1986	3
Dharm Adhikari	1986	2
Dilwaala	1986	3
Duty	1986	2
Ehsaan Aap Ka	1986	1
Ek Aur Sikander	1986	3
Ek Main Aur Ek Tu	1986	1
Ghar Sansar	1986	2
Insaaf Ki Awaaz	1986	2
Jaal	1986	1
Janbaaz	1986	1
Kaanch Ki Deewar	1986	1
Karma	1986	2
Kasme Rasme	1986	1
Khamosh Nigahen	1986	2
Locket	1986	2
Maa Ki Saugandh	1986	1
Main Balwaan	1986	2
Maqaar	1986	1
Mera Dharam	1986	1
Mera Haque	1986	1
Muddat	1986	3
Musafir	1986	1
Nasihat	1986	4
Palay Khan	1986	1
Patton Ki Bazi	1986	1
Peechha Karo	1986	3
Preeti	1986	3
Qatil Aur Aashiq	1986	1
Qatl	1986	1
Samay Ki Dhaara	1986	3
Samundar	1986	3
Saveraywali Gaadi	1986	2
Shatru	1986	1
Sheesha	1986	2
Singhasan	1986	4
Suhaagan	1986	5
Swarag Se Sunder	1986	4
Woh Din Aayega	1986	1
Zindagani	1986	1
Aulad	1987	1
Dacait	1987	1
Dil Tujhko Diya	1987	2
Diljalaa	1987	3
Hawalaat	1987	1
Himmat Aur Mehanat	1987	2
Hiraasat	1987	3
Imaandaar	1987	1
Inaam Dus Hazaar	1987	2
Insaf Ki Pukar	1987	3
Jaan Hatheli Pe	1987	1
Kaash	1987	3
Kaun Jeeta Kaun Haara	1987	1
Khel Tamasha	1987	1
Madadgaar	1987	1
Majaal	1987	4
Manu The Great	1987	1
Mard Ki Zabaan	1987	2
Marte Dam Tak	1987	1
Mohre	1987	1
Mr. India	1987	4
Muqaddar Ka Faisla	1987	4
Naam O Nishan	1987	1
Nazrana	1987	1
Parakh	1987	2
Parivaar	1987	1
Pyaar Karke Dekho	1987	1
Pyar Ke Kabil	1987	2
Pyar Ki Jeet	1987	1
Sabse Badi Adalat	1987	1
Sadak Chhap	1987	3
Sindoor	1987	1
Vishal	1987	1
Aage Ki Soch	1988	4
Akarshan	1988	1
Aakhri Muqabla	1988	2
Anjaam Khuda Jaane	1988	1
Charanon Ki Saugandh	1988	3
Commando	1988	1
Faisla	1988	1
Gangaa Jamunaa Saraswathi	1988	1
Ghar Mein Ram Gali Mein Shyam	1988	1
Hatya	1988	1
Hum Farishte Nahin	1988	1
Jaan-E-Jaana	1988	2
Kabzaa	1988	1
Khatron Ke Khiladi	1988	1
Maalamaal	1988	2
Mar Mitenge	1988	1
Mohabbat Ke Dushman	1988	1
Namumkin	1988	3
Paap Ki Duniya	1988	2
Paap Ko Jalaakar Raakh Kar Doonga	1988	1
Pyar Ka Mandir	1988	3
Pyar Mohabbat	1988	1
Rukhsat	1988	3
Saazish	1988	1
Shahenshah	1988	2
Shiva-Shakti	1988	2
Sone Pe Suhaaga	1988	3
Waaris	1988	2
Waqt Ki Awaz	1988	3
Woh Milie Thi	1988	2
Zalzala	1988	1
Aakhri Badla	1989	2
Daata	1989	2
Do Qaidi	1989	1
Do Yaar	1989	1
Dost Garibon Ka	1989	1
Gair Kaanooni	1989	1
Galiyon Ka Badshah	1989	2
Guru	1989	1
Ilaaka	1989	2
Joshilaay	1989	1
Mamta Ki Chhaon Mein	1989	2
Mil Gayee Manzil Mujhe	1989	3
Prem Pratigyaa	1989	2
Sachche Ka Ból-bálá	1989	2
Sikka	1989	1
Souten Ki Beti	1989	3
Taaqatwar	1989	1
Toofan	1989	1
Tujhe Nahin Chhodunga	1989	1
Ustaad	1989	2
Amba	1990	1
Bahadur Jiska Naam	1990	2
Chhotu Ka Badla	1990	2
C.I.D.	1990	1
Naya Khoon	1990	2
Shandar	1990	1
Wafaa	1990	2
Begunaah	1991	2
Car Thief	1991	3
Garajna	1991	1
Iraada	1991	2
Jigarwala	1991	1
Laal Paree	1991	1
Gori	1992	1
Touhean	1992	1
Mr. Shrimati	1994	1
Saboot Mangta Hai Kanoon	1994	1
Muthibhar Zameen	1996	3
Aakhri Sanghursh	1997	1
Love In Bombay	2013	3

== As a producer ==
Kishore Kumar also produced 14 films, and wrote the story for these films. Six of these films were not completed. He is also credited with writing the screenplays of five films, two of which remained incomplete. He also directed 12 films, four of which were abandoned.

Kishore Kumar also composed music for all of his home productions:

1. Jhumroo (1961)
2. Door Gagan Ki Chhaon Mein (1964)
3. Hum Do Daku (1967)
4. Door Ka Raahi (1971)
5. Zameen Aasman (1972)
6. Badhti Ka Naam Dadhi (1974)
7. Shabhash Daddy (1979)
8. Chalti Ka Naam Zindagi (1982)
9. Door Wadiyon Mein (1982)
10. Mamta Ki Chhaon Mein (1990)

Some of his notable songs as a composer include Koi Ham Dam Na Raha, Aa Chal Ke Tujhe, and Beqarar Dil Tu Gaye Ja. He also composed several Bengali songs, including Nayano Sarasi Keno, Priyatama Ki Likhi Tomay (sung by Lata Mangeshkar), and Sei Raate Raat Chilo Poornima.

== Work with other singers and music directors ==
Kishore Kumar is also credited with the highest number of multi-singer and male duet hits with the finest singers of different eras. Some of the notable songs are as follows:

Song	Movie(s)	Co-singers
"Hum Ko Tumse Ho Gaya Hai"	Amar Akbar Anthony (1977)	Mohd Rafi, Mukesh & Lata Mangeshkar
"Tik Tik Tik Tik"	Kal Aaj Aur Kal (1971)	Mukesh and Asha Bhosle
"Anhoney Ko Honey Karde"	Amar Akbar Anthony (1977)	Mahendra Kapoor and Shailendra Singh
"Kya Mausam Hai"	Doosra Aadmi (1977)	Mohd Rafi and Lata Mangeshkar
"Mohabbat Bade Naam Ki Cheez Hai"	Trishul (1978)	Lata Mangeshkar and K. J. Yesudas
"Jaanu Meri Jaan"	Shaan (film) (1980)	Mohd Rafi Asha Bhonsle and Usha Mangeshkar
"Kitni Khoobsurat Ye"	Bemisal (1982)	Lata Mangeshkar and Amit Kumar
"Aati Rahange Baharen"	Kasme Vaade (1978)	Asha Bhosle and Amit Kumar
"Chana Joor Garam"	Kranti (1981)	Mohd Rafi, Nitin Mukesh & Lata Mangeshkar
"Hum Premi Prem Karna"	Parvarish (1977)	Mohd Rafi and Shailendra Singh
"Rang jamake"	Naseeb (1981)	Mohd Rafi, Asha Bhosle and Shailendra Singh
"Zindagi Milke Bitayenge"	Satte Pe Satta (1982)	Bhupinder Singh, Sapan Chakraborty and Rahul Dev Burman
"Yeh Dosti"	Sholay (1975)	Manna Dey
"Haal Chaal Theek"	Mere Apne (1971)	Mukesh
"Ek Rasta"	Ram Balram (1980)	Mohd Rafi
"Yadon Ki Baraat"	Yaadon Ki Baaraat (1973)	Mohd Rafi
"Ek Chatur Naar Karke Sringar"	Padosan (1968)	Manna Dey
"Sa Re Ga Ma"	Chupke Chupke (1975)	Mohd Rafi
"Salamat Rahe Dostana"	Dostana	Mohd Rafi
"Yuhi Gaate Raho"	Saagar (1985)	S. P. Balasubrahmanyam
"Qurbani Qurbani"	Qurbani (1980 film)	Anwar and Aziz Nazan
"Ek Ek Ho Jaye"	Ganga Jamuna Saraswati (1988)	Pankaj Udhas
"Babu Samjho Ishare"	Chalti Ka Naam Gaadi (1958)	Ashok Kumar and Manna Dey
"Bandh Mutthi Lakh Ki"	Chalti Ka Naam Zindagi	Mohd Rafi and Manna Dey
"Wadon Ke Shaam Aaye"	Anand Aur Anand	Abhijeet and Asha Bhosle
"De Daru"	Karma	Mahendra Kapoor and Manhar Udhas
"Tal Betal Sara Jiwan"	Zamana	Hariharan (singer) & Sayed Amir Ahmed
"Bindiya Tum Ham Se Keh Do Pyar Hai"	Keh Do Pyar Hai	Suresh Wadkar and Udit Narayan
"Jhat-Pat Ghunghat Khol"	Sindoor	Hariharan
"Aaj Hum Ko Aadmi Ki Pehchaan Ho Gayi"	Muqaddar Ka Faisla	Mohammed Aziz
Masti Mein Baithke Lagao	Chor Ho To Aisa	Hemant Kumar and Asha Bhosle
Damdi Damdi Paisa Paisa (Maze Uda Lo Duniyawalo)	Hamari Shaan	Talat Mahmood and G.M. Durrani
Ek Choti Si Naukri Ka Talabgar Hoon Main	Naukri	Shyamal Mitra and Shankar Dasgupta
Sardi Ka Bukhar Bura	Manchala	Chitragupt
Yeh Duniya Suit Boot Ki Babu	Aabshar	S. Balbir and S.D. Batish

The following is the list of co-singers and the number of songs Kumar sang with each of them:

Co-singer	Number of songs
Solo	1142
Asha Bhosle	687
Lata Mangeshkar	343
Mohammed Rafi	72
Mahendra Kapoor	48
Anuradha Paudwal	39
Manna Dey	37
Usha Mangeshkar	33
Amit Kumar	31
Alka Yagnik	31
Shamshad Begum	28
R D Burman	18
Shailendra Singh	18
Sulakshana Pandit	15
Bhupendra	15
Geeta Dutt	14
Hemlata	13
Mehmood	13
Mukesh	12
Suman Kalyanpur	12
Sharda Rajan Iyengar	11
Kavita Krishnamurthi	11
Suresh Wadkar	11
Sushma Shreshta	11
S. Janaki	10
Kanchan	8
Sadhana Sargam	8
Usha Khanna	8
Manhar Udas	7
Mohammed Aziz	7
Vijayta Pandit	7
Chandrani Mukherjee	6
Pankaj Mitra	6
Sapan Chakraborty	6
Annette Pinto	5
Anoop Kumar	5
S Balbir	5
Dilraj Kaur	4
Shivangi Kolhapure	4
Alisha Chinoy	3
Amitabh Bachchan	3
Anupama Deshpande	3
Anwar	3
Bappi Lahiri	3
Hema Malini	3
Jayshree Shivram	3
Leena Chandavarkar	3
Nitin Mukesh	3
Padmini Kolhapure	3
Peenaz Masani	3
Ram Kamlani	3
Ranu Mukherjee	3
Sudha Malhotra	3
Usha Timothy	3
K. J. Yesudas	3
Aarti Mukherjee	2
Ameeta	2
Anand Kumar C	2
Anu Malik	2
Arun Kumar	2
Asrani	2
Aziz Nazan	2
Duet	2
Hariharan	2
Jatin	2
Kavita Paudwal	2
Laxmikant Shantaram Kudalkar	2
Meena Kapoor	2
Meena Patki	2
Mukri	2
Navin Nischol	2
Nazia Hasan	2
Nirmala Devi	2
P Susheela	2
Pamela Chopra	2
R P Sharma	2
Rajeshwari	2
S D Batish	2
Sabita Chowdhury	2
Shankar Dasgupta	2
Sudesh Bhosle	2
Sundar	2
Sunil Kumar	2
Vani Jairam	2
Bhushan Mehta	2
Minoo Purushottam	2
Abhijeet Bhattacharya	1
Ahmed	1
Usha Rage	1
Vandana Shastri	1
Ambar Kumar	1
Ameen Sayani	1
Anand Bakshi	1
Antara Chowdhury	1
Asit Sen	1
Babban Lal Yadav	1
Basu Chakraborty	1
Bhagwan	1
Bhavna Shah	1
Bonny Remedious	1
C Ramchandra	1
Chandru Atma	1
Chitragupt	1
Daisy Irani	1
Danny Denzongpa	1
Dev Anand	1
Deven Verma	1
Dilip	1
Dilip Kumar	1
Ghulam Mustafa Durrani	1
Geeta Siddharth	1
Gopi Krishna	1
Gulshan Bawra	1
Harindranath Chatterjee	1
Hemant Kumar	1
I S Johar	1
Jagmohan	1
Zohrabai Ambalewali	1
Jaspal singh	1
Javed Jafri	1
Zeenat aman	1
Johnny Whiskey	1
Johnny Walker	1
Kamal Barot	1
Keshto Mukherjee	1
Krishna Goyal	1
Krishna Kalle	1
Lalit	1
Laxmi Shankar	1
Libi Rana	1
Madan Mohan	1
Mahesh Kishore	1
Maruti Rao	1
Varsha Bhosle	1
Master Raju	1
Vijay Benedict	1
Meghna Shrivastava	1
Nisha Kohli	1
Nitin Magesh	1
Pankaj Udhas	1
Poornima	1
Pran	1
Preeti Uttam	1
Priya Mayekar	1
Pt Satyanarayan Mishra	1
R S Bedi	1
Rajkumari Dubey	1
Rakesh Roshan	1
Rakhi	1
Rama Vij	1
Ravi	1
Rekha	1
Rishi Kapoor	1
Roopesh Kumar	1
S K Bhattacharya	1
S L Puri	1
S P Balasubramaniam	1
Sabina Yasmin	1
Sachin Dev Burman	1
Sadhana Singh	1
Salma Agha	1
Sandhya Pandit	1
Sapna Mukherjee	1
Sayed Amir	1
Sayyad Ul Hasan	1
Shahid Bijnauri	1
Shakti Thakur	1
Shanti	1
Sharmila Tagore	1
Shyamal Mitra	1
Sudha Ghosh	1
Sulochana Kadam	1
Sunil	1
Sunil Dutt	1
Talat Mahmood	1
Tina Munim	1
Udit Narayan	1
Yogeeta Bali	1

Below is a list of music directors with the total number of songs which they each composed in collaboration with Kumar.

- Music Director Name
- Number of songs
- R D Burman 563
- Laxmikant-Pyarelal 401
- Bappi Lahiri 301
- Kalyanji-Aanandji 270
- Rajesh Roshan 152
- S D Burman 119
- Shankar Jaikishan 105
- Kishore Kumar 73
- Usha Khanna 60
- O.P.Nayyar 42
- Ravindra Jain 40
- Madan Mohan 36
- Anu Malik 35
- Chitragupta 35
- Ravi 30
- Salil Chaudhary 26
- Khayyam 25
- Sapan Jagmohan 23
- C Ramchandra 21
- Sonik Omi 21
- Hemant Kumar 18
- Ram-Laxman 16
- Hemant Bhosle 11
- Anil Biswas 10
- Sapan Chakraborty 10
- Shyamal Mitra 10
- Datta Naik 9
- Sharda 9
- Amar-Utpal 8
- Ganesh 8
- Jaidev 8
- Roshan 8
- Unknown 8
- Aanand-Milind 7
- Basu-Manohari 7
- Shiv-Hari 7
- Hridyanath Mangeshkar 6
- Khemchand Prakash 6
- Bhola Shreshta 5
- Nadeem-Shravan 5
- Babla Mehta 4
- Jugal Kishore 4
- Khemchand Prakash, Bhola Shreshtha, James Singh 4
- Mahesh naresh 4
- Mohinder Singh Sarna 4
- Vanraj Bhatia 4
- Vedpal 4
- Avinash Vyas 3
- Bipin Dutta 3
- Jimmy 3
- Lala Asar sattar 3
- Mandhir-Jatin 3
- Nitin Mangesh 3
- Uttam-Jagdish 3
- Vipin Reshamiya, Kishore Singh 3
- Ajit Singh 2
- Ali Akbar Khan 2
- Anil-Arun 2
- Babu Singh 2
- Chand Pardesi 2
- Chandru 2
- Deepan Chatterji 2
- Govind Naresh 2
- Husnlal Bhagatram 2
- Iqbal Qureshi 2
- Jai Kumar Partee 2
- Manoj-Gyan 2
- Pradeep Roy Chaudhary 2
- Prem Dhawan 2
- R Sudarshan, Dhaniram 2
- Sajjad 2
- Satyam 2
- Dakshina Tagore 1
- Ghulam Haider and Hansraj Behl 1
- Mohammed Shafi 1
- Ajit verman 1
- Alok Ganguly 1
- Anup Jalota 1
- Arun Kumar 1
- Arun Mukharjee 1
- Ashish Pandit-Pritam Chakraborty 1
- Asit Ganguly 1
- Aziz 1
- B D Burman 1
- Basant Prakash 1
- Bhupen Hazarika 1
- Bhushan mehta 1
- Bulo C Rani 1
- C.P.Bhatti 1
- Chic Chocolate 1
- Dattaram Wadekar 1
- Ghanshyam 1
- Hansraj behl 1
- Iqbal 1
- Jeetu Tapan 1
- K.Babuji 1
- M.Ashraf 1
- Manas Mukharjee 1
- Manna dey, S K Pal, Kheemchand Prakash 1
- Nachiket Ghosh 1
- Naushad 1
- Panna Lal Ghosh 1
- Raj Kamal 1
- Ramesh Gupta 1
- Ratandeep hemraj 1
- S K Pal 1
- Shamji-Ghanshyamji 1
- Shanti Kumar Desai 1
- Sudhir Phadke 1
- Ved Pal Sharma 1

Total 2678 songs he sang with 110 different music directors in Hindi only throughout his life time including himself also.
