= Tamasha (1952 film) =

- Directed by: Phani Majumdar
- Written by: Kishan Chandar
- Screenplay by: Phani Majumdar
- Story by: S. N. Banerjee
- Produced by: Ashok Kumar; Savak Vacha
- Starring: Meena Kumari; Dev Anand; Ashok Kumar; Kishore Kumar
- Cinematography: Roque M. Layton
- Edited by: Raghu Tipnis
- Music by: Manna Dey; S. K. Pal; Khemchand Prakash
- Production company: Bombay Talkies
- Distributed by: Bombay Talkies
- Release date: 1952
- Country: India
- Language: Hindi

Tamasha is a 1952 Indian Hindi-language romantic comedy film directed by Phani Mazumdar, starring Meena Kumari, Dev Anand and Ashok Kumar. One of the big hits of the year from Bombay Talkies produced by Ashok Kumar and Savak Vacha, "Tamasha" had a narrative far ahead of its times, its action spread over 16 eventful days. This movie is a copy of the Hollywood movie It Started with Eve

A young Meena Kumari with a sparkle in her eyes and an impish smile was quite the opposite of the accomplished tragedienne she became immortalised as. This is the first film of Meena Kumari and Dev Anand and the 2nd film in which Kishore Kumar and Dev Anand acted together. First film of Dev Anand and Kishore Kumar was Ziddi along with Kamini Kaushal.

== Storyline ==
A young heir-apparent, Dilip is hopelessly in love with an aspiring film actress, Nayantara, who together with her scheming mother, a struggling director, and an assistant actually want him to finance her launching pad. The stumbling block is Dilip's ailing grandfather, Rai Saheb who is dead against the alliance and constantly warning him to break away from the actress that will otherwise only bring shame to the family. Although Dilip keeps assuring him that he has severed all ties, and is, in fact, dating a homely girl from a middle-class family, he is actually besotted with the actress who is simultaneously in an unholy alliance with big star Ashok Kumar. Persuaded by Rai Sahib, Dilip hires the services of Kiran as his new love interest. As Kiran gets more and more comfortable as the housekeeper, Dilip gets caught in the whirlpool of his own creation, drowned in his infatuation with Nayantara and admiration for Kiran.

== Cast ==
- Ashok Kumar as Ashok Kumar
- Dev Anand as Dilip
- Meena Kumari as Kiran
- Kishore Kumar as Rajju
- Bipin Gupta as Rai Sahib

== Soundtrack ==
The first lines of the song Khali Pili Kaahe Ko sung by Kishore Kumar was again used for the song Yeh Duniya Suit Boot Ki Babu as a parody from film Aabshar (1953) sung by Kishore Kumar, S. Balbir, and S.D. Batish.

Song	Singer
"Armanon Ki Nagari"	Lata Mangeshkar
"Kyun Ankhiyan Bhar Aayi"	Lata Mangeshkar
"Thi Jinse Palbhar Ki Pehchan"	Asha Bhosle
"Koi Jal Jal Mare"	Asha Bhosle
"Nahin Boloon, Nahin Boloon"	Rajkumari
"Raat Mohe Meetha Meetha"	Geeta Dutt
"Khali Pili Kaahe Ko"	Kishore Kumar
