= Albela =

Albela may refer to:

- Albela (1951 film), a Hindi film acted and directed by Bhagwan Dada
- Albela (1971 film), a Hindi film directed by A. Shamsheer and starring Mehmood and Aruna Irani
- Albela (1986 film), an unreleased Hindi film directed by Ravi Tandon
- Albela (2001 film), a Hindi film directed by Deepak Sareen and starring Govinda and Aishwarya Rai
- Albela (actor) (1940–2004), Pakistani actor and comedian

== See also ==
- Albeli (disambiguation)
