= Mere Bhaiya =

- Directed by: Satyen Bose
- Produced by: Tarachand Barjatya
- Starring: Vijay Arora; Suresh Chatwal; Nazima
- Music by: Salil Chowdhury
- Release date: 4 February 1972
- Country: India
- Language: Hindi

Mere Bhaiya is a 1972 Bollywood drama film directed by Satyen Bose and produced by Tarachand Barjatya. The film stars Vijay Arora and Suresh Chatwal in lead roles.

== Cast ==
- Vijay Arora as Subhash Sharma
- Nazima as Laxmi Sharma
- Master Satyajeet as young Subhash
- Suresh Chatwal as Avinash
- Anita Guha as Saraswati
- V. Gopal as Police Inspector Shukla
- Bipin Gupta as Advocate Pandit Devdhar Sharma
- Durga Khote as Avinash's Mother
- Murad as Police Inspector
- Sulochana Chatterjee as Saraswati's Mother
- Tarun Ghosh as Tarun
- Moolchand
- Shail Chaturvedi as Publisher
- Amrit Lakhanpal
- Raman Kumar as Ranga Tripathi
- Manisha as Kaminibai

== Soundtrack ==
The music of the film was composed by Salil Chowdhury, while lyrics were penned by Yogesh.

1. "Chhod Gali" – Lata Mangeshkar
2. "Pyaas Liya Hai Manwa" – Lata Mangeshkar
3. "Chanchal Man Par" – Manna Dey
4. "Marzi Hai Tumhari" – Manna Dey and Lata Mangeshkar
5. "Mere Bhaiya" – Sushma Shreshta
