= Anamol =

Anamol or Anmol (Nepali: अनमोल, Urdu: انمول) is a name used in Nepal, Pakistan, and India. Its meaning is "Precious". It is a unisex name.

== Film ==
- Anmol, a 1993 Indian film
- Anmol Ghadi, a 1946 Hindi film
- Anmol Ratan, a 1950 Bollywood drama film
- Anmol Tasveer, a 1978 Bollywood film
- Anmol, a 1973 Lollywood film

== People ==
Notable people with Anamol as a given name are:

- Anmol K.C., Nepalese actor and producer
- Anmol Malik, playback singer and songwriter in the Indian Film
