= Jhamela =

1953 film

- Directed by: Bhagwan
- Produced by: Bhagwan
- Starring: Bhagwan; Geeta Bali; Anwar Hussain; Sunder
- Music by: C. Ramchandra
- Production company: Bhagwan Art Productions
- Release date: May 8, 1953
- Running time: 120 minutes
- Country: India
- Language: Hindi

Jhamela (English: Problem) is a 1953 Hindi comedy thriller film produced and directed by Bhagwan, for his Bhagwan Art Productions. The film was a repeat formula Bhagwan had earlier used in his commercially successful film Albela (1951). Albela with its "rumba-samba beats" in the composition of music director C. Ramchandra's songs, its comedy, and melodramatic story, had turned out to be an "all-time hit". With music again composed by C. Ramachandra, and casting actress Geeta Bali, Bhagwan tried to recreate the magic of Albela with little success. The film was termed a "semi-hit" at the box-office. It starred Geeta Bali, Bhagwan, Shakuntala, Sunder, Anwar Hussain and Badri Prasad.

== Cast ==
- Geeta Bali
- Bhagwan
- Sunder
- Anwar Hussain
- Badri Prasad
- Baby Shakuntala

== Soundtrack ==
The music was composed by C. Ramchandra, who had previously given hit music for Albela (1951). According to C. Ramchandra, his inspiration for the "unique beat" for Albela (1951) and Jhamela (1953), came from the "funeral dance music he heard in Madras". One of the popular song was "Dekho Ji Dekho Mera Dil Le Ke" sung by Lata Mangeshkar. Rajendra Krishan wrote the lyrics for the film. The playback singers were Lata Mangeshkar, C Ramchandra (Chitalkar), Meena Kapoor and Francis Vaz.

=== Songlist ===
Song	Singer
"Dekho Ji Dekho Mera Dil Le Ke"	Lata Mangeshkar
"Kahe Naina Lade Is Dil Ke Liye"	Lata Mangeshkar
"Balakhaati Ithalaati Aai Hai Shaam"	Chitalkar Ramchandra, Lata Mangeshkar
"Tere Dil Se Mera Dil Kyon Kuchh Kehna Chahe"	Lata Mangeshkar, Chitalkar
"Yahi Hai Teri Duniya"	Meena Kapoor
"Kaisi Hai Teri Duniyaa, Banaaye Kaise Ye Insaan"	Meena Kapoor
"Baat Rahegi Hoke"	Lata Mangeshkar, Chitalkar
"Rota Hai Dil Tera Bhi Tu Gaa"	Chitalkar, Francis Vaz
"Yeh Duniya Hai Ek Jhamela"	Chitalkar
"Tu Thehar Abhi Main Aaya Hoon"	Sundar, C. Ramchandra
"Dekho Ji Dekho Mera Dil Le Ke" (duet)	Lata Mangeshkar, Chitalkar
