= Bhagwan Dada =

Indian actor and director (1913 - 2002)

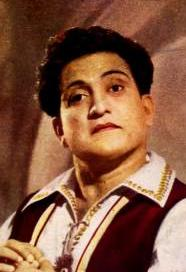
- Born: Bhagwan Abhaji Palav; 1 August 1913; Amravati, Bombay State, British India (present-day Maharashtra, India
- Died: 4 February 2002 (aged 88); Mumbai, Maharashtra, India
- Occupations: Actor; Producer; Director

Bhagwan Dada (born Bhagwan Abhaji Palav; 1 August 1913 – 4 February 2002), also credited and mononymously known as Bhagwan, was pioneering Indian actor, director and producer whose career spanned over six decades, making him one of the earliest and most enduring figures in Indian Cinema. While widely celebrated for his landmark musical blockbuster Albela (1951), Bhagwan Dada's broader legacy rests on his status as Indian Cinema's first true dancing superstar and a versatile comedic lead. Renowned for his distinct, effortless, and rhythmic dance style - characterized by slow-motion footsteps and signature shoulder shrugs - his choreography fundamentally shaped the foundation of men dance in Bollywood, preceding dancing stars like Shammi Kapoor while directly influencing much later generation of actors, including Amitabh Bachchan and Govinda. Beyond his on-screen persona as a comic and a dancer, he was an accomplished filmmaker who directed and produced numerous films, mostly action-heavy stunt films during the 1930s and 1940s alongside a few comedy films during the 1950s and 1960s. Apart from Hindi, he also worked in a few Marathi films and occasionally, in films of other languages.

== Early life ==
Bhagwan Dada was born in 1913 as Bhagwan Abhaji Palav in Amravati, Maharashtra. He was the son of a Mumbai textile mill worker and was obsessed with films. Bhagwan Dada hailed from a Marathi family. He worked as a labourer, but dreamt of acting in films. He got his break with bit roles in silent films and got totally involved with the studios. He learned film-making and at one stage used to make low-budget films (in which he arranged for everything including the design of costumes and arranging meals for the cast) for Rs. 65,000.

== Career ==
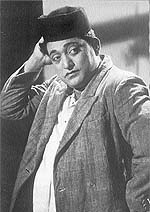
Bhagwan Dada

Bhagwan Abhaji Palav, popularly known as Bhagwan dada, mainly due to his love for wrestling, made his debut in the silent era with the film Criminal.

He co-directed his first film Bahadur Kisan with Chandrarao Kadam in 1938. From 1938 to 1949, he directed a string of low-budget stunt and action films that were popular with the working classes. He usually played a naive simpleton. One of the notable films that he made during this period was the Tamil film Vana Mohini (1941) that starred M. K. Radha and Sri Lankan actress Thavamani Devi.

In 1942, as part of a scene, he had to slap actress Lalita Pawar hard. He accidentally slapped her too hard, which resulted in facial paralysis and a burst left-eye vein. After three years of treatment, Pawar was left with a disabled left eye.

He turned producer in 1942 with Jagruti Pictures, purchased some land and set up Jagriti Studios in Chembur in 1947. Because of advice from Raj Kapoor, he turned to making a social film called Albela, starring Bhagwan and Geeta Bali, and featuring music by his friend Chitalkar, or C. Ramchandra. The songs of the film, in particular "Shola jo bhadke" are still remembered. Albela was a huge hit. After Albela, Bhagwan got C. Ramchandra and Geeta Bali together again in Jhamela (1953), where he tried to recreate the formulaic success of Albela with little success. He also directed and acted in Bhagam Bhag in 1956.

== Later life ==
After that, Bhagwan did not have any more hits and eventually had to give up producing and directing films. He sold his 25-room waterfront bungalow in Juhu and his fleet of seven cars (one for each day of the week). He took whatever roles he could get, but apart from Jhanak Jhanak Payal Baje (1955), Chori Chori (1956) and Gateway of India (1957), none were roles of note, and he eventually took on bit parts in which he did his famous dance (made even more famous by Amitabh Bachchan using it as his default dance step).

Most of Bhagwan's associates left him in his time of need, apart from C. Ramchandra, Om Prakash and lyricist Rajinder Krishan, who continued to meet him even in his chawl. Bhagwan died of a massive heart attack at his residence in Dadar on 4 February 2002 at the age of 88.

== Filmography ==
=== Hindi films ===
Year	Film	Role	Notes
1931	Bewafa Ashq		
1935	Katil Katar		
1935	Himmat-e-Marda		
1936	Bharat Ka Lal		
1938	Bahadur Kisan		Also Director
1939	Gunehgaar		Also Director
1942	Sukhi Jeevan		Also Director
1942	Zindagi		
1943	Zaban		
1943	Badla		Also Director
1944	Bahadur		Also Director
1945	Ji Haan		
1945	Nagma-e-Sahra	Altamash	Also Director
1946	Dosti		Also Director
1947	Bahadur Pratap		Also Director
1947	Matwale		Also Director
1947	Shake Hands		Also Director
1948	Jalan		Also Director
1948	Lalach		Also Director
1948	Mala The Mighty		
1948	Matlabi		
1948	Tumhari Kasam		
1949	Bachke Rehna		Also Director
1949	Bhedi Bungla		Also Director
1949	Jigar		Also Director
1949	Bhole Piya		
1949	Bigde Dil		
1949	Jeete Raho		
1949	Joker		
1949	Khush Raho		
1949	Pyaar Ki Raat		
1949	Roop Lekha		
1949	Shauqeen		
1950	Achchaji		
1950	Actor		
1950	Babooji		Also Director
1950	Bhole Bhale		Also Director
1950	Bakhshish		
1951	Actor		
1951	Aflatoon		
1951	Albela	Pyarelal	Also Writer, Producer and Director
1951	Damaad	Chamak	
1952	Baghdad		
1952	Bhule Bhatke		
1952	Goonj		
1952	Sindbad The Sailor		
1953	Char Chand		
1953	Shamsheer		
1953	Jhamela		Also Writer, Producer and Director
1953	Rangeela		Also Writer, Producer and Director
1954	Halla Gulla		Also Writer, Producer and Director
1955	Bandish	Balloon Seller	Guest Appearance as the performer of the song "Le Lo Ji Hamare Gubbare Pyaare Pyaare"
1955	Chhabila		
1955	Deewar		
1955	Flying Man		
1955	Jhanak Jhanak Payal Baaje	Badlu	
1955	Oonchi Haveli		
1955	Pyaara Dushman		Also Producer and Director
1956	Bhagam Bhag	Bhagwan "Bhaggu"	Also Writer, Producer and Director
1956	Char Minar		
1956	Chori Chori	Bhagwan	
1956	Kar Bhala		
1956	Makkhee Choos		
1956	Mr. Lambu		
1956	Passing Show		Also Director
1956	Sheikh Chilli	Sheikh Chilli	
1957	Aadhi Roti		
1957	Agra Road	C. I. D. InspectorKhanna	
1957	Beti		
1957	Bhabhi	Stage actor	
1957	Garma Garam		
1957	Gateway of India	Lakshmidas	
1957	Miss Bombay		
1957	Raja Vikram		
1957	Ustad		
1958	Bhala Aadmi		Also Director
1958	Sachche Ka Bol Bala		Also Director
1958	Chal Baaz		
1958	Dulhan		
1958	Mr. Q		
1958	Naya Kadam		
1958	Police	Singer-dancer at the beach	Guest Appearance as the performer of the song "Dil Ko Lagela Mohabbat Ka Chaska"
1958	Son of Sindbad		
1958	Trolley Driver		
1959	Chacha Zindabad		
1959	Duniya Na Mane	Bhagwan (previously known serially by the aliases Sohan, Mohan, Ram, Shyam and Harnam)	
1959	Forty Days		
1959	Kangan	Gopal	
1959	Lal Nishan		
1959	Mohar		
1959	O Tera Kya Kehna		
1960	Bhakt Raj		
1960	Diler Hasina		
1960	Nakhrewali		
1960	Rangeela Raja		
1960	Road No. 303		
1960	Zameen Ke Tare	Buddhu	
1960	Zimbo Shaher Mein		
1961	Lucky Number		
1961	Ram Lila		
1961	Salaam Mem Saheb		
1961	Sapan Suhane	Bhagwan	
1961	Shola Jo Bhadke		Also Director
1961	Stree		
1961	Teen Ustad		
1961	Wazir-e-Azam		
1962	Aalha Udal		
1962	Baghdad Ki Raaten		
1962	Madam Zapatta		
1962	Pathan		
1962	Rocket Girl		
1962	Tower House	Ajay	
1963	Awara Abdulla		
1963	Baghi Shehzada		
1963	Dekha Pyaar Tumhara		
1963	Jab Se Tumhe Dekha Hai	One of the main Qawwali singers	Guest Appearance as one of the performers of the song "Tumhe Husn Deke Khuda Na Sitamgar Banaya Banaya"
1963	Rustom-e-Baghdad		
1964	Aandhi Aur Toofan		
1964	Hukum Ka Ekka		
1964	Magic Carpet	Sultan	
1964	Main Bhi Ladki Hoon	T. B.	
1964	Khooni Khazana		
1964	Krishnaavtar		
1965	Bekhabar		
1965	Char Chakram		
1965	Chor Darwaza		
1965	Ham Diwane		Also Director
1965	Khakaan		
1965	Sher Dil		
1965	Sindbad Alibaba And Aladdin	Alibaba	
1965	Tarzan And King Kong		
1965	Tarzan Comes To Delhi		
1966	Chale Hain Sasural		
1966	Daku Mangal Singh		
1966	Duniya Hai Dilwalon Ki		
1966	La Bela	Kishan	Also Co-writer, Producer and Director
1966	Ladka Ladki		
1966	Nagin Aur Sapera		
1967	Albela Mastana		
1967	Baghdad Ki Raatein		
1967	Chand Par Chadayee		
1967	Chhaila Babu		
1967	Duniya Nachegi		
1967	Gunehgar		
1967	Hum Do Daku		
1967	Sangdil		
1969	Badmash		
1969	Gunda		
1969	Intaqam	Magician Pasha	
1969	Raat Ke Andhere Mein		
1969	The Killers		
1970	Aag Aur Daag		
1970	Choron Ka Chor		
1970	Geet	Deen Dayal's cook	
1970	Mangu Dada		
1970	Night In Calcutta		
1970	Sasta Khoon Mehnga Pyar		
1970	Suhana Safar	One of the bus passengers	
1971	Hungama		
1971	Kabhi Dhoop Kabhi Chhaon		
1971	Kathputli		
1971	Mera Gaon Mera Desh	Chhotumal	
1971	Saaz Aur Sanam		
1971	Sher-e-Watan		
1971	Shri Krishna Leela		
1972	Aage Barho		
1972	Aan Baan	Prisoner 420	
1972	Do Chor	Police Constable	
1972	Gaon Hamara Shaher Tumhara	Film Director	
1972	Raaste Kaa Patthar	Constable Bhagwan	
1972	Rani Mera Naam		
1972	Tangewala		
1973	Banarasi Babu	Dada	
1973	Chhalia		
1973	Kuchhe Dhaage	Ram Bharose	
1973	Shareef Budmaash	Shambhu	
1974	Apradhi	Motta	
1974	Badhti Ka Naam Dadhi	Dr. Ghoosawala	
1974	Balak Dhruv		
1974	Chori Chori		
1974	Har Har Mahadev		
1974	Imaan		
1974	Resham Ki Dori		
1975	Andhera		
1975	Daku Aur Bhagwan		
1975	Faraar	Constable	
1975	Ganga Ki Kasam		
1975	Jaggu	Qawal	
1975	Kaala Sona	Bartender	
1975	Mazaaq		
1975	Maze Le Lo		
1975	Natak		
1975	Rafoo Chakkar	S. Manglani's secretary	
1975	Toofan Aur Bijlee		
1975	Zindagi Aur Toofan		
1975	Zorro		
1976	Bhoola Bhatka		
1976	Ek Se Badhkar Ek		
1976	Kabeela	Durjan's victim	
1976	Sangram		
1976	Shankar Shambhu	Dhondu	
1977	Agent Vinod	Gypsy Sardar	
1977	Chacha Bhatija		
1977	Chakkar Pe Chakkar	Bhagwanbhai	
1977	Chor Sipahee		
1977	Jay Vejay	Sher Singh's victim	
1977	Khel Khilari Ka		
1977	Ladki Jawan Ho Gayi		
1977	Mandir Masjid		
1977	Mukti		
1977	Sahib Bahadur	Hare Murari's assistant	
1977	Vishwasghaat		
1978	Azaad	Ram Singh Bahadur	
1978	College Girl		
1978	Darwaza		
1978	Karwa Chouth		
1978	Kasme Vaade		
1978	Main Tulsi Tere Aangan Ki	Bhim Singh	
1978	Phandebaaz	Film Director	
1978	Toote Khilone		
1979	Ahinsa		
1979	Arab Ka Sona : Abu Kaalia		
1979	Bin Baap Ka Beta		
1979	Heera-Moti		
1979	Jaan-e-Bahaar		
1979	Jhoota Kahin Ka		
1979	Meri Biwi Ki Shaadi		
1979	Naya Bakra		
1979	Prem Bandhan		
1979	Shikshaa		
1979	Shyamala		
1979	Taraana		
1980	Aasha	Pinto	
1980	Beqasoor		
1980	Bombay 405 Miles	Photographer	
1980	Chambal Ki Kasam		
1980	Do Premee	Bhagwan	
1980	Ganga Aur Suraj		
1980	Jazbaat	Francis	
1980	Khoon Kharaba		
1980	Nazrana Pyar Ka		
1980	Patthar Se Takkar		
1980	Phir Wahi Raat	Gendamal	
1980	Pyaara Dushman		
1980	Taxi Chor		
1980	Yeh Kaisa Insaf ?		
1981	Aas Paas	Master Bandit's associate	
1981	Biwi-O-Biwi		
1981	Bulundi		
1981	Chhupa Chhuppi		
1981	Commander		
1981	Ek Aur Ek Gyarah		
1981	Fifty Fifty		
1981	Gehra Zakhm		
1981	Kahani Ek Chor Ki		
1981	Katilon Ke Kaatil		
1981	Kranti	Allah Rakha	
1981	Naseeb	A chef	
1981	Professor Pyarelal		
1981	Saajan Ki Saheli		
1981	Sahhas	Havildar	Bilingual; made in Bengali too
1981	Woh Phir Nahin Aaye		
1982	Aadat Se Majboor		
1982	Badle Ki Aag	Train Master	
1982	Chalti Ka Naam Zindagi		
1982	Dharam Kanta		
1982	Do Ustad		
1982	Honey		
1982	Kaamchor		
1982	Khush Naseeb		
1982	Meri Kahani		
1982	Rustom		
1982	Sanam Teri Kasam	Eunuch Bride	
1982	Sun Sajna		
1982	Teesri Ankh		
1982	Teri Maang Sitaron Se Bhar Doon		
1982	Ustadi Ustad Se	Qawwali dancer	
1983	Bekhabar		
1983	Bindiya Chamkegi	Havildar	
1983	Chatpati		
1983	Dard-e-Dil		
1983	Kaun Hai Who ?		
1983	Nastik		
1983	Paanchwin Manzil		
1983	Pyaassi Ankhen		
1983	Siskiyan		
1984	Asambhava		
1984	Jhutha Sach		
1984	Love Marriage		
1984	Meraa Dost Meraa Dushman		
1984	Nadaniyan		
1984	Shapath		
1984	Sunny		
1984	Tere Mere Beech Mein		
1984	Yaadgaar	Bhagwan	
1984	Yeh Desh	Harold	
1985	Alag Alag		
1985	Babu		
1985	Ganga Ke Paar		
1985	Kali Basti	Pandu	
1985	Mera Damad	A drunkard	
1985	Lover Boy		
1985	Patthar Dil		
1985	Pyaari Bhabhi		
1985	Ramkali		
1986	Andheri Raat Mein Diya Tere Haath Mein		
1986	Mangal Dada		
1986	Mohabbat Ki Kasam	A dancer	
1986	Raat Ke Baad		
1986	Vidhaan		
1987	Deewana Tere Naam Ka		
1987	Khooni Darinda		
1987	Marte Dum Tak		
1987	Mera Yaar Mera Dushman		
1988	Biwi Ho Toh Aisi		
1988	Ganga Tere Desh Mein		
1988	Halaal Ki Kamai		
1988	Hatya		
1988	Prem Sandesh		
1988	Soorma Bhopali		
1988	Zalzala		
1988	Zulm Ko Jala Doonga		
1989	Ajnabi Saaya		
1989	Do Yaar		
1989	Farz Ki Jung	Police Constable Pandu	
1989	Gair Kanooni		
1989	Main Tere Liye		
1989	Maine Pyar Kiya		
1989	Na-Insaafi		
1989	Nache Nagin Gali Gali		
1989	Taaqatwar	A guest at the wedding	Cameo
1989	Tere Bina Kya Jeena		
1990	Baap Numbri Beta Dus Numbri		
1990	Hum Se Na Takrana		
1990	Kasam Dhande Ki		
1990	Khatarnaak		
1990	Swarg		
1991	Irada		
1991	Laal Paree		
1991	Numbri Aadmi		
1992	Touhean		
1993	Kala Coat		
1994	Yuhi Kabhi		
1995	Jai Vikraanta		
1995	Jhumka		
1995	Mera Damad		
1995	Paapi Farishte		
1996	Maahir	A dancer at the bar	
1996	Sautela Bhai		
1996	Talaashi		

=== Marathi films ===
Year	Film	Role	Notes
1968	Bai Mothi Bhagyachi		
1975	Jyotibacha Navas		
1977	Banya Bapu		
1977	Bhingri		
1977	Navra Mazha Brahmachari		
1977	Ram Ram Gangaram	Gangaram's uncle	
1978	Bhairu Pehelwan Ki Jai		
1978	Lakshmi		
1979	Aaitya Bilavar Nagoba		
1979	Aapli Manse		
1980	Fatakadi		
1980	Hyoch Navra Pahije		
1980	Saran Tula Bhagvanta		
1981	Govinda Ala Re Ala		
1984	Aali Laher Kela Kahar		
1984	Bahuroopi		
1984	Chorachya Manat Chandane		
1984	Jugalbandi		
1984	Shradha		
1986	Bijli		
1986	Dhondi Dhondi Paani Re		
1987	Bola Dajiba		
1987	Chhakke Panje		
1989	Ina Mina Dika		
1989	Navra Baiko		
1992	Sagale Sarkhech		
1993	Anyayacha Pratikar		

=== Tamil films ===
Year	Film	Notes
1940	Jayakodi	Only Writer and Director
1941	Vana mohini	Only Writer and Director
1941	Raja Gopichand	Only Director

=== Other languages' films ===
Year	Film	Language	Role	Notes
1956	Dosthara	Sri Lankan		
1963	Laakho Vanzaro	Gujarati		
1981	Do Posti	Punjabi		

== In popular culture ==
In 2016, a Marathi movie Ekk Albela released which was a biopic of the actor.
