= Jayakodi =

1940 film by Bhagwan Dada

- Poster
- Directed by: Bhagwan Dada
- Story by: Bhagwan Dada
- Starring: K. T. Rukmini; K. Natarajan
- Cinematography: Ahmedulla
- Edited by: S. Kumar
- Music by: C. Ramchandra
- Production company: South Indian United Artistes Corporation
- Release date: 17 March 1940
- Country: India
- Language: Tamil

Jayakodi is a 1940 Indian Tamil-language social problem film directed by Bhagwan Dada. The film stars K. T. Rukmini and K. Natarajan. It revolves around a girl who rebels against the dowry system. The film was released on 17 March 1940 and became a success. No print of it is known to survive, making it a lost film.

== Plot ==
Rajam, an impoverished Brahmin girl, is unmarried due to her family's inability to give dowry. Though a neighbouring family helps Rajam's family during their times of need, attempts to have her married still fail. Because of misunderstandings over money, a voracious moneylender murders Rajam's father and sets fire to their house. Rajam becomes a social activist and rebels against the dowry system. She becomes known as "Jayakodi", and prospective bridegrooms demanding dowry begin to disappear under mysterious circumstances, making people wonder what happened to them. After Rajam solves many dowry issues, she marries a man who genuinely loves her, and the couple continue their war against the dowry system.

== Cast ==
- K. T. Rukmini as Rajam / Jayakodi
- K. Natarajan as Rajam's husband
- Kulathu Mani
- K. Kokila
- S. Basha
- K. T. Saku Bai

== Production ==
Jayakodi was produced by the South Indian United Artistes Corporation and directed by Bhagwan Dada, who also wrote the story. The dialogues were written by B. V. Swamy and S. R. Sarangan. Cinematography was handled by Ahmedulla, and editing by S. Kumar.

== Music ==
The music of the film was composed by C. Ramchandra, while the lyrics were written by C. Murugesan.

Songs list

Song - Singer/s

1. Padu Mosamey - K. Kokila
2. Thaniye - K. Natarajan
3. Idhu Vakai Yaan - K. Natarajan, R. B. Lakshmi Devi
4. Aasai Naayagi - K. T. Saku Bai, Comedian Ambi

== Release and reception ==
Jayakodi was released on 17 March 1940, and became a commercial success, establishing Rukmini as a star. The film's title later became prefixed to Natarajan's name. No print of the film is known to survive, making it a lost film.
