= Girl Friend (1960 film) =

- Directed by: Satyen Bose
- Starring: Kishore Kumar; Waheeda Rehman
- Music by: Hemanta Kumar Mukherjee
- Release date: 1960
- Country: India
- Language: Hindi

Girl Friend is a 1960 Indian Hindi-language film directed by Satyen Bose. Its music was composed by Hemanta Kumar Mukherjee. The film stars Kishore Kumar and Waheeda Rehman, marking their only film together. Its story centres on a romance between neighbours whose relationship faces opposition from their parents.

The film was initially titled Tricycle and was partly financed by actor Bipin Gupta. It was conceived as a vehicle for showcasing Rehman's dancing abilities. Girl Friend was reviewed in The Times of India as a "good time-killer" and performed moderately well in Bombay and Calcutta upon release. The film's prints are reportedly no longer available.

== Cast ==
- Kishore Kumar
- Waheeda Rehman
