= Bhagam Bhag (1956 film) =

- Directed by: Bhagwan Dada
- Starring: Kishore Kumar
- Music by: O. P. Nayyar
- Release date: 1956
- Country: India
- Language: Hindi

Bhagam Bhag is a 1956 Indian Hindi-language film directed by Bhagwan Dada. It stars Kishore Kumar; and features a soundtrack composed by O. P. Nayyar. The film was a crime thriller inspired by the road films of Bob Hope and Bing Crosby. It premiered in Bombay on 3 February 1956 and was described as a "rollicking gay musical comedy" in a Times of India review.

In a filmindia review from March 1956, critic Baburao Patel was highly critical of Bhagam Bhag and described it as an "another crude, ugly, hybrid, illiterate entertainer from Bhagwan". Initially unsuccessful at the box office, Bhagam Bhag gained popularity by April and helped establish Kumar as a leading actor.

The film is known for its unusual playback-singing arrangements: three singers—Mohammed Rafi, Shiv Dayal Batish, and Kumar himself—provided vocals for Kumar's character. Rafi also sang part of the duet "Hey Babu Yeh Hai Zamana Tera" for Kumar, alongside Kumar singing for himself in the same song.

== Cast ==
- Kishore Kumar
- Shashikala
- Bhagwan Dada
- Smriti Biswas
- Badri Prasad
- Tiwari
- Kumkum
