= Savera (1958 film) =

1958 film by Satyen Bose

- Written by: Satyen Bose
- Produced by: Ruby Sen
- Starring: Ashok Kumar; Meena Kumari
- Edited by: Dulal Dutta
- Music by: Sailesh Mukherjee
- Release date: 1958
- Running time: 152 minutes
- Language: Hindi

Savera (transl. Morning) is a 1958 Indian Hindi-language film directed by Satyen Bose starring Ashok Kumar, Meena Kumari in lead roles. Music director Sailesh Mukherjee gave the music of the film.

== Plot ==
Kundan (Ashok Kumar) is a medical student who is falsely implicated in a murder charge and fails to complete his degree. His neighbor and childhood friend Shanti (Meena Kumari) who Kundan grew up. Once Shanti while playing marries him, but he did not like. In angry she scratch with some small weapon saying she will marry him only, but it created a scar in his hand. But his family relocated to another village and they separated. Kundan became a medical student, but some people framed him in case and jailed. Later he took odd jobs for survival. Eventually, Kundan takes the job of a taxi driver and befriends a bunch of criminals. On a trip, he meets with a so-called Swami Poornananda (Bipin Gupta) who is also involved in criminal activities, immediately they befriend. By the end of their train trip they meet with an accident, injuring Swami. Kundan rescues him and takes him to a nearby ashram where Kundan had to disguises himself as Swami as he witnessed a murder of young man who attacked Kundan, but his mother attacked him and dies. Swamy poornanadan lost his memory and jailed for the murder as Kundan. In the Ashram, Kundan meets Shanti who also works in the ashram and identifies him as childhood friend from the cut in his hand. As Swamy Poornanad he done lots of good deeds for the villages and once he done a ceaserian operation succefully and people started to treat him as god's version. But when Swamy Poornanad now Kundan became convicted for the murder, in the court Kundan revealed he is the culprit and murder is done by the mother. He was jailed. After releasing from Prison, Shanti waits for him and they live happily ever after.

== Cast ==
- Ashok Kumar as Kundan
- Meena Kumari as Shanti
- Bipin Gupta as Swami Purnananda
- Leela Mishra
- Keshto Mukherjee
- Bhagwan Sinha
- Kammo
- Samson
- Uma Khosla
- Shiela Vaz
- Sarita
- Jagdev
- Mumtaz Begum
- Prem Dhawan
- Ram Lal
- Bhagwan Sinha
- B.N. Banerjee
- Dhumal
- Ramesh Sinha

== Soundtrack ==
The film had seven songs in it. The music of the film was composed by Sailesh Mukherjee. Shailendra and Prem Dhawan wrote the lyrics.

Song	Singer
"Aankh Micholi Khel Rahi"	Lata Mangeshkar
"O Pardesi Chhora"	Lata Mangeshkar
"Nadiya Ke Pani"	Lata Mangeshkar
"Chhupa Chhupi O Chhupi Agad Bagad Jai Re"	Lata Mangeshkar, Manna Dey
"Jeevan Ke Raste Hazaar"	Manna Dey
"Thehro Zara Si Der To"	Geeta Dutt
"Mane Na Mane Na"	Geeta Dutt
