= Daal Me Kala =

1964 film by Satyen Bose

- Directed by: Satyen Bose
- Written by: Mahendra Pran (Dialogue)
- Produced by: Bipin Gupta
- Music by: C. Ramchandra
- Production company: Roop Rangam
- Release date: 1964
- Country: India
- Language: Hindi

Daal Mein Kala is a 1964 Hindi-language film starring Kishore Kumar, Nimmi and Agha. On the run for unpaid bills, an unemployed slacker is mistaken for a professor

== Plot ==
When Bombay-based Rajaram and Rajendra Kumar are unable to pay their hotel bill, they board a train without buying tickets to flee. When confronted with a ticket-checker, they alight at Bangalore and widower Bishambharnath mistakes Rajendra for Professor Roy. The duo accompany the former to his mansion where he lives with his daughter, Manju; widowed sister, and a niece, Sheela. The duo are introduced to the family, settle down and eventually Rajendra and Manju on one hand, and Rajaram and Sheela on the other, fall in love. They are not aware that Professor Roy has also arrived in Bangalore, but is being held against his will by Banke Bihari, who has mistaken him for a singer named Natwar Shyam. It is during the performance that Roy will manage to escape and rather dramatically arrive at Bishambharnath's residence, not only exposing the true identities of the duo, but also ending their romance and possibly getting them arrested on a number of charges.

== Cast ==
- Kishore Kumar as Rajendra Kumar "Raju" / Professor Roy
- Nimmi as Manju
- Agha as Rajaram "Raja"
- Shammi as Sheela
- Om Prakash as Banke Bihari
- Abhi Bhattacharya as Professor Roy
- Sajjan as Natwar Shyam
- Tun Tun as Rajaram's Landlady
- Bipin Gupta as Rai Bahadur Bishambharnath
- Sulochana Chatterjee as Bishambharnath's Sister
- Sunder as Bhola
- Keshto Mukherjee as Mangu
- Mohan Choti as Barber

== Music ==
Song	Singer
"Chand Chupchap Hai"	Kishore Kumar
"O Jhoom Jhoom"	Kishore Kumar
"O, Bacha Le Hamen Uparwale, Ek Idhar, Ek Udhar"	Kishore Kumar, C. Ramchandra
"Do Aankhen Janani, Do Aankhen Mardani"	Kishore Kumar, Asha Bhosle
"Mohabbat Karna Hai Aasan, Kisi Par Marna Hai Aasan, Nibhana Mushkil Hai"	Asha Bhosle, C. Ramchandra, Manna Dey
"In Aankhon Ko Tumhe"	Asha Bhosle
"Samjhe Na Dil Ki Lagi"	Asha Bhosle
"Tum Chale Aaye"	Asha Bhosle
