= Albeli =

Albeli may refer to:

- Albeli (1955 film), an Indian Hindi-language romantic drama film
- Albeli (1974 film), a 1974 Indian Hindi-language film

== See also ==
- Albela (disambiguation)
