= Haye Mera Dil =

- Directed by: Ved Sharma; Madan Sinha
- Starring: Kishore Kumar; Kumkum
- Music by: Usha Khanna
- Release date: 1968
- Country: India
- Language: Hindi

Haye Mera Dil is a 1968 Indian Hindi-language film directed by Ved Sharma and Madan Sinha. It stars Kishore Kumar and Kumkum. The film's production began as early as April 1965, when The Samachar announced the cast including Kumar, Kumkum, Prem Chopra and I. S. Johar. The soundtrack for Haye Mera Dil was composed by Usha Khanna; and featured vocals by Manna Dey.

== Cast ==
- Kishore Kumar
- Kumkum
- Prem Chopra
- I. S. Johar
