= Paisa Hi Paisa =

- Directed by: Mehrish
- Produced by: Mehboob Khan
- Starring: Kishore Kumar; Shakila; Mala Sinha
- Music by: Anil Biswas
- Release date: 1956
- Country: India
- Language: Hindi

Paisa Hi Paisa is a 1956 Indian Hindi-language film produced by Mehboob Khan and marking the directorial debut of Khan's assistant, Mehrish. It featured a soundtrack composed by Anil Biswas; and starred Kishore Kumar, Shakila, and Mala Sinha.

The film premiered in Bombay on 5 October 1956 and was reviewed two days later in The Times of India under the headline, "Crude Treatment, Direction Mar Paisa Hi Paisa". Another contemporary review by Swatantra described it as "brilliant in patches" and an "entertaining farce".
