= Albela Mastana =

- Directed by: B. J. Patel
- Starring: Kishore Kumar; Bhagwan Dada
- Music by: N. Dutta
- Release date: 1967
- Country: India
- Language: Hindi

Albela Mastana is a 1967 Indian Hindi-language film directed by B. J. Patel. It stars Kishore Kumar and Bhagwan Dada. The film's music was composed by N. Dutta. Film critic S. Jahnvi described Albela Mastana as one of two comedies bearing the title Albela—inspired by the 1951 hit of the same name—the other being Mehmood's Albela (1971).

Released during the latter phase of Kishore Kumar's career as a leading actor, Albela Mastana was a box office failure. According to the authors of Kishore Kumar: The Ultimate Biography (2022), the actor-singer was so disinterested in the film that his songs were instead sung by Mahendra Kapoor.

== Cast ==
- Kishore Kumar
- Bhagwan Dada
- Asha Nandkarni
- Aruna Irani
