= Akalmand =

- Directed by: N.S. Raj Bharath
- Written by: N.S. Raj Bharath (writer, screenplay); Kader Khan (dialogue)
- Produced by: P.V. Gurupadam
- Starring: Jeetendra; Sridevi
- Cinematography: P. Devaraj
- Edited by: Vellaisamy
- Music by: Laxmikant–Pyarelal
- Release date: 1984
- Running time: 132 minutes
- Country: India
- Language: Hindi

Akalmand (transl. intelligent) is a Hindi language romantic comedy thriller film directed by N.S. Raj Bharath. The film stars Jeetendra, Sridevi, Ashok Kumar, Kader Khan and Shakti Kapoor in lead roles with Aruna Irani, Sarika and Raza Murad in supportive roles.

== Plot ==
The film begins with the foremost surgeon Dr. Kiran who embarked to operate on a notorious criminal in which he succeeds irrespective of threats. Just after, Inspector Prabhu presents him with a coin that has a lucky charm as gratitude. Besides, Kiran is annoyed with his wife's possessive and suspicious Priya. Once, in her absence, his friend Shakti introduces him to a dancer Lulu that lures him. Meanwhile, Lulu identifies Shakti as a kingpin, so, she extorts him. Hence, Shakti decides to eliminate her. At the same time, Kiran calls her for a night but upon her arrival, he is unable to deceive his wife whereby, whereas Lulu respects his morality.

During talks, Kiran learns that she is striving hard for the treatment of her blind sister and dumb brother. So, commiserated Kiran gifts the lucky charm coin to Lulu and asks her to stay for the night due to the heavy rain. Exploiting it, Shakti brutally kills Lulu when Kiran becomes panic-stricken spotting her dead body but crossing many hurdles, he disposes of it. By the time, Priya returns and Kiran pretends to be normal but he is clutched into a vicious circle day by day. Then, his well-wisher Major Uncle boasts about his courage and guidance to catch the real homicide. So, Kiran starts his investigation moves pawns and proves Shakti guilty. Finally, the movie ends with Kiran pleading for forgiveness from Priya and shouldering Lulu's brother & sister.

== Cast ==
- Jeetendra as Dr. Kiran
- Sridevi as Priya
- Ashok Kumar as Major
- Sarika as Advocate Shobha
- Aruna Irani as Lulu
- Kader Khan as Z
- Shakti Kapoor as Shakti
- Raza Murad as Police Inspector
- Birbal as drunk
- K. K. Reddy
- Brahmachari
- Master Ravi
- Yasmin

== Soundtrack ==
The lyrics are written by Anand Bakshi

Song	Singer
"I love you"	Kishore Kumar, S. Janki
"Meri Biwi Maike Chali Gayi "	Kishore Kumar
"Ek din ki baat hai"	Kishore Kumar
"Madrasi Ladka Punjabi Ladke Se"	Asha Bhosle
"Nazar Dekho"	Asha Bhosle
