= Duniya Nachegi =

- Directed by: K. Parvez
- Starring: Kishore Kumar; Kumkum; Bhagwan Dada
- Music by: Laxmikant–Pyarelal
- Release date: 1967
- Country: India
- Language: Hindi

Duniya Nachegi is a 1967 Indian Hindi-language film directed by K. Parvez. It stars Kishore Kumar, Kumkum, and Bhagwan Dada. The soundtrack was composed by Laxmikant–Pyarelal.

The film's plot is documented in the second volume of World Filmography (1977). It is one of only two films, the other being Begunah (1957), in which Manna Dey provided playback vocals for Kishore Kumar.

Duniya Nachegi was released during the latter phase of Kumar's career as a leading man and was a financial failure.

== Cast ==
- Kishore Kumar
- Kumkum
- Bhagwan Dada
- Mukri
- Iftekhar
- Jankidas
- Aruna Irani
- Shammi
