= Chalti Ka Naam Gaadi =

1958 film by Satyen Bose

- Theatrical release poster
- Directed by: Satyen Bose
- Written by: Ramesh Pant; Gobind Moonis
- Produced by: Anoop Sharma; Kishore Kumar
- Starring: Ashok Kumar; Madhubala; Anoop Kumar; Kishore Kumar
- Cinematography: Aloke Dasgupta
- Edited by: R. M. Tipnis
- Music by: Sachin Dev Burman
- Production company: K. S. Films
- Distributed by: M/S Issardas Naoomal
- Release date: 1958
- Running time: 173 min
- Country: India
- Language: Hindi
- Box office: ₹25 million (US$270,000)

Chalti Ka Naam Gaadi (transl. That which moves is called a car (Note: The implied meaning is "One that works is okay, no matter how it works, despite its inherent weaknesses". The reference is probably to the three brothers' old worn out car, which is mostly out of order, yet works [In fact the three brothers sing the movie's very first song in that car]. An almost similar phrase in Hindi is "Jo Jeeta Wohi Sikander" [In fact, there is a movie with this name too]. The literal meaning is "One who wins is Alexander (the Great)". The implied meaning is almost same as above - one who wins is the winner, no matter how he did it."))) is a 1958 Indian musical comedy film directed by Satyen Bose. Starring Madhubala with the Ganguly brothers —Ashok Kumar, Anoop Kumar, and Kishore Kumar— the film revolves around a middle-aged man who resents women due to some misunderstandings and forbids his younger brothers from marrying.

Expected by Kishore Kumar to flop, Chalti Ka Naam Gaadi opened to major commercial success, eventually becoming the most successful work of Bose and Ganguly brothers, as well as Madhubala's fourth consecutive major hit of 1958, thus solidifying her position as the top female star of the late 1950s and early 1960s.

Chalti Ka Naam Gaadi has received overwhelmingly positive reviews from critics for its comical situations, soundtrack, execution, and performances. Over the years, the film has gained classic status and has also inspired several films including Badhti Ka Naam Dadhi (1974), Saade Maade Teen (2006) and Dilwale (2015). It was ranked #18 in 2003 Outlook Magazine poll of 25 leading Indian Directors for "Best Bollywood Movies of all time".

== Plot ==
Brothers Brijmohan, Manmohan, and Jagmohan Sharma run a garage. Brijmohan hates women and does not allow any women or pictures of them in his garage unless it is an emergency. One day, while Manmohan is on the night shift, a woman named Renu comes to the garage seeking help as her car breaks down. Renu gets angry at Manmohan because he is sleeping when he is supposed to be on duty. Manmohan does not like the fact that Renu shouted at him and initially refuses to repair her car, but finally agrees. Manmohan fixes the car, and Renu leaves, forgetting to pay Manmohan for his services. He tells his brother Brijmohan about this and realizes that Renu forgot her purse in the garage. Manmohan goes through it and finds a pass to a concert. Manmohan goes to this concert to recover his money. When Manmohan reaches the venue, he is not allowed to enter as the pass has Renu's name on it. Not wanting to let go of his money, Manmohan waits in Renu's car to meet her when she comes out. He, however, falls asleep and Renu does not notice him; she drives home and parks in her garage with Manmohan in the car. When Manmohan wakes up, he gets hungry and looks for some food in Renu's garage. A servant in the house sees this and chases Manmohan, who manages to escape. On his way home, he notices a few men dumping a corpse on the road and fleeing. When he tells his brothers about his night the next morning, they have a hearty laugh at his expense.

Later, Renu calls the garage asking for help with her car and assuring she will pay back her fees. Manmohan refuses to go to her house, fearing that he will be recognized by Renu's servant and will get into trouble; Jagmohan decides to go. Jagmohan meets Sheela in Renu's house and the two start talking. Jagmohan is, however, afraid of women. He gets nervous because Sheela is around and cannot repair the car. After Jagmohan takes off (not before drinking 10 glasses of water due to anxiety), Renu decides to call Manmohan. Meanwhile, Renu's father is approached by Raja Hardayal Singh, who wants to get his younger brother married to Renu. Renu's father decides to talk to Renu about this, not knowing that Raja Hardayal and his brother are crooks – Manmohan saw Raja Hardayal's brother dump the corpse.

As Renu is falling for Manmohan and the crooks desperately want her inheritance, Renu and Manmohan are captured by Hardayal's men. In captivity, they meet Kamini, the woman whose photo Renu had found in Brijmohan's room. Brijmohan and Kamini were in love, but she was married off to Raja Hardayal. Brijmohan is under the impression that she dumped him for a richer man; as a result, he decides that he never wants to associate with women again. Kamini tries to free Renu and Manmohan, but a guard enters. Kamini, however, can escape and goes looking for Brijmohan. Meanwhile, Raja Hardyal Singh captures Renu's father and forces him to get Renu married to his brother, threatening to kill Manmohan if he doesn't. Before Raja Hardayal Singh has his way, Brijmohan is brought to the scene by Kamini. Brijmohan, who is a boxing champion, fights Raja Hardyal Singh's men with the help of his two brothers. In the end, Brijmohan and his brothers are victorious. Manmohan and Renu decide to get married. So do Brijmohan and Kamini, and Jagmohan and Sheila.

== Cast ==
- Ashok Kumar as Brijmohan Sharma
- Madhubala as Renu
- Anoop Kumar as Jagmohan "Jaggu" Sharma
- Kishore Kumar as Manmohan "Mannu/Mohan" Sharma
- Sahira as Sheila
- Veena as Kamini
- K.N. Singh as Raja Hardayal Singh
- Mohan Choti as Maujiya
- Sajjan as Prakashchand
- Helen as Dancer
- Cuckoo as Dancer
- Minhaj Ansari as Dancer
- Asit Sen as a jewelry shop owner Lalchand (the dead man)
- S N Bannerjee as Renu's father

== Production ==
On the sets of Chalti Ka Naam Gaadi, Madhubala rekindled a friendship with Kishore Kumar, her childhood playmate, and friend Ruma Guha Thakurta's ex-husband. Following a two-year-long courtship, Madhubala married Kishore in court on 16 October 1960.

Kishore Kumar made Chalti Ka Naam Gaadi, hoping it would fail commercially; he wanted to show losses in his income, and thus avoid paying a huge income tax to the authorities. To his disgust, the film became a success; as he did not want to add to his earnings, he gave Chalti Ka Naam Gaadi and all its rights to his secretary Anoop Sharma, who retained the copyright. The income tax case on Kishore Kumar was not solved even after forty years.

In one of the scenes from this film, Manmohan (Kishore Kumar), on seeing Renu (Madhubala) in his garage, excitedly says, "Hum samjha koi bhoot-woot hoga" ("Oh I thought it was a ghost"). The dialogue was a reference to Madhubala's portrayal of a ghostly woman in Mahal (1949).

== Soundtrack ==
Chalti Ka Naam Gaadi

Soundtrack album by Sachin Dev Burman
- Released: 1958
- Genre: Feature film soundtrack
- Language: Hindi
- Label: Saregama
- Producer: Sachin Dev Burman

The music is composed by Sachin Dev Burman with Jaidev and his son, Rahul Dev Burman as the assistant music composers, and lyrics by Majrooh Sultanpuri. The songs "Hum The Woh Thi" and "Ek Ladki Bheegi Bhaagi Si" were based on Tennessee Ernie Ford's "The Watermelon Song" and Merle Travis's "Sixteen Tons" respectively.

The soundtrack was popular with the audience, and was placed at #51 in Film Companion's list "Top 100 Bollywood albums".

The song "Ek Ladki Bheegi Bhaagi Si" was listed among the Top 25 Rain Songs of Bollywood by Rediff.

Song	Singer(s)
"Babu Samjho Ishaare..."	Kishore Kumar, Manna Dey
"Ek Ladki Bheegi Bhaagi Si..."	Kishore Kumar
"In Haathon Se Sab Ki Gaadi..."	Kishore Kumar
"Hum The, Woh Thi Aur Sama Rangeen..."	Kishore Kumar
"Main Sitaron Ka Taraana..."	Kishore Kumar, Asha Bhosle
"Haal Kaisa Hai Janaab Ka..."	Kishore Kumar, Asha Bhosle
"Hum Tumhare Hain.."	Asha Bhosle, Sudha Malhotra
"Ruk Jaao Na Ji, Aisi Kya Jaldi..."	Asha Bhosle

== Release ==
The film premiered at Novelty Theatre, Bombay, on 26 December 1958. It was reportedly popular with audiences and completed a 25-week ("silver jubilee") run at the theatre on 19 June 1959.

== Reception ==
=== Box office ===
Chalti Ka Naam Gaadi grossed ₹2.5 crore, including a nett of ₹1.25 crore at the box office. It was the second highest-grossing Indian film of 1958, and the twenty-first highest-grossing Indian film of the 1950s. Adjusted for inflation, its gross was equivalent to about ₹485 crores in 2016.

=== Critical reception ===
A Times of India review, dated 28 December 1958, carried the headline: "Chalti Ka Naam Gaadi Is Riotous Comedy".

The film has received positive reviews from modern-day critics. Author Dinesh Raheja, writing for Rediff.com, said that "if the best screwball comedies are those that continue to connect even with the modern generation, this fifties jest-setter is the sure shot winner." He also commented favorably on Madhubala and Kishore Kumar's chemistry, adding that Chalti Ka Naam Gaadi was the finest of the five films they made together.

Sandipan Deb of Mint called it "best Hindi movie ever made", noting its treatment of female characters:

What is not often mentioned about Chalti Ka Naam Gaadi is its portrayal of women. Madhubala's character is that of a remarkably liberated woman, driving her car and determined to be in charge of her life in a male-dominated world. [...] Anoop Kumar's beloved runs a petrol pump. Ashok Kumar's former girlfriend was forcibly married off, but he does not think twice about taking her back when they meet 10 years later. I cannot think of another Hindi film from the 1950s (or even 1960s or 1970s, in fact) that treats women so equally as men, and in which all the male protagonists are less chauvinistic.

== Remakes and popular culture ==
- Saade Maade Teen (2007), Marathi film
- Dilwale (2015)
- Shatranj (1993)
- In the 1990 film Jeevan Ek Sanghursh, the characters of Madhuri Dixit and Anil Kapoor imitated a dance sequence featuring Madhubala and Kishore Kumar from Chalti Ka Naam Gaadi.

== See also ==
- Hulchul (2004) film
