= Miss Mala =

- Directed by: Jayant Desai
- Starring: Kishore Kumar; Vyjayanthimala
- Release date: 1954
- Country: India
- Language: Hindi

Miss Mala is a 1954 Indian Hindi-language film directed by Jayant Desai. The film's soundtrack was composed by Chitragupt. It was one of the several "dance comedies" co-acted by Kishore Kumar and Vyjayanthimala.

According to Kishore Kumar: The Ultimate Biography, Miss Mala was inspired by Alfred Hitchcock's Spellbound (1945), although the authors describe it as a romantic comedy rather than a psychological thriller.

Miss Mala premiered in Bombay on 14 May 1954 and was described by The Times of India as a "sparkling musical".

A review in Swatantra, however, was critical of the film, commenting that "one could say Jayant Desai has done to Hitchcock's Spellbound what Hitler did to Poland."

== Cast ==
- Kishore Kumar
- Vyjayanthimala
- Jeevan
- Bipin Gupta
- Samson
- Umakant
