= Badhti Ka Naam Dadhi =

1974 film by Kishore Kumar

- Poster
- Directed by: Kishore Kumar
- Cinematography: Aloke Das Gupta, Nandu Bhattacharya
- Edited by: R.Tipnis
- Music by: Kishore Kumar
- Release date: 30 June 1974 (India)
- Country: India
- Language: Hindi

Badhti Ka Naam Dadhi (transl. That Which Grows is a Beard) is a 1974 Bollywood comedy film directed by Kishore Kumar. The name is similar to a previous Kishore Kumar film Chalti Ka Naam Gaadi.

== Plot ==
The premise of the film is that a multimillionaire, who has no heir, decides to leave his wealth to the person who has the longest beard. What follows is complete mayhem as Kishore Kumar and K. N. Singh plot to outwit one another.

== Cast ==
- I. S. Johar as Seth Sohrabji Bandookwala
- Bhagwan Dada as Dr. Ghoosawala
- Sunder as Dr. Dandawala
- Marutirao Parab as Dr.Thappadwala
- Amit Kumar as Fakkad / Jhango
- Ashok Kumar as Gulfam
- Kishore Kumar as Mr.Gypsy/Police Commissioner/Director/Young Constable/Old Constable/Inspector
- Bappi Lahiri as Bhopu
- Sheetal as Julie
- K.N. Singh as Khadak Singh
- Rajesh Khanna as guest appearance
- Asrani as guest appearance
- Bindu as guest appearance
- Anwar Hussain as Rosario
- Hercules as Hercu
- Master Chintu as Munni

== Soundtrack ==
#	Title	Singer(s)
1	"Badhti Ka Naam Dadhi"	Kishore Kumar and chorus
2	"Bhole Re Sajan"	Kishore Kumar, Asha Bhosle
3	"He Gori Banki Chhori"	Kishore Kumar
4	"Phir Suhani Sham Dhali"	Kishore Kumar
5	"Sun Chache Bol Bhatije"	Kishore Kumar, Amit Kumar
6	"Zindagi Hasin Hai"	Kishore Kumar, Bhupinder Singh
7	"Hun Kaun Chhun Mane Khabar"	I. S. Johar, Bhagwan, Maruti, Sundar
8	"Yeh Jawani Din Char"	Bappi Lahiri
