= Hum Do Daku =

1967 Indian Hindi-language film

- Directed by: Kishore Kumar
- Written by: Kishore Kumar
- Produced by: Kishore Kumar
- Starring: Kishore Kumar; Anoop Kumar; Ganga; Leena
- Music by: Sebastian D'Souza
- Release date: 17 May 1967

Hum Do Daku (transl. "Us, Two Dacoits") is a 1967 Indian Hindi-language film directed, produced and written by Kishore Kumar. The film stars Kumar and his brother Anoop Kumar, opposite debutante actresses, Ganga and Leena (sisters of Madhubala).

== Cast ==
The film featured performances from the following list of actors:

- Kishore Kumar as Mannu
- Anoop Kumar as Jaggu
- Ganga
- Leena
- Bhagwan
- Sunder
- Maruti

== Production ==
Kishore Kumar launched the project in July 1964, originally titled Do Daku before being renamed Hum Do Daku. The film served as a debut for his sisters-in-law, Zaheeda (screen name Ganga) and Shahida (screen name Leena). This casting was reportedly a strategic move to manage production while his wife, Madhubala, dealt with declining health.

== Soundtrack ==
The musical arrangements were handled by Sebastian D'Souza, which gave the soundtrack a distinct "Goan feel." The soundtrack included "Ae Haseeno Nazneeno", a reimagining of Cab Calloway's "Minnie the Moocher".

== Reception ==
The film was a commercial failure upon its release.

Satyajit Ray's Goopy Gyne Bagha Byne (1969; which Kumar was originally slated to star in), shared a similar storyline but achieved massive success where Hum Do Daku failed.

The film is now believed to be lost. The original cans were lost after being seized by the Income Tax Department.
