= Anmol Tasveer =

1978 film

- Directed by: Satyen Bose
- Written by: Kuldip Singh Loomba; Satyen Bose
- Release date: 1978
- Country: India
- Language: Hindi

Anmol Tasveer is a 1978 Bollywood film directed by Satyen Bose.

== Cast ==
- Birbal
- Manik Dutt
- Preeti Ganguli
- Anoop Kumar
- Ashok Kumar
