= Pyaar Diwana =

Pyar Diwana
- Directed by: Samar Chatterjee
- Starring: Kishore Kumar; Mumtaz
- Music by: Lala Sattar
- Release date: 1972
- Running time: 2 hours 15 min
- Country: India
- Language: Hindi

Pyar Diwana is a 1972 Bollywood comedy film directed by Samar Chatterjee. The film stars Kishore Kumar, Mumtaz in lead roles.

== Plot ==
It is a love story a young wealthy boy Sunil who falls in love with his classmate Mamta. Sunil's family is against their relationship because they want another girl in their choice as Sunil's wife.

== Cast ==
- Kishore Kumar as Sunil
- Mumtaz as Mamta
- Padma Khanna as Rekha
- Sunder as Dr. Sundar
- Iftekhar
- S. Bannerji as Sunil's Uncle

== Soundtrack ==
Song	Singer
"Zara Rukiye, Zara Suniye"	Kishore Kumar
"Kisko Chahoon Aur Kisko Na"	Kishore Kumar
"Ab Main Jaoon, Magar Kyun Abhi Itni Jaldi, Kya Bataoon"	Kishore Kumar, Asha Bhosle
"Hay Mere Allah, Yeh Kya Baat Huyi, Chain Nahin Paya Jabse"	Usha Mangeshkar, Asha Bhosle
"Yeh Zindagi Bhi Kya Hai" - 1	Asha Bhosle
"Yeh Zindagi Bhi Kya Hai" - 2	Asha Bhosle
"Mere Saiyan Bada Albela"	Asha Bhosle
"Apni Aadat Hai"	Mohammed Rafi
