= Satyen Bose =

Indian film director

- Born: 22 January 1916; Calcutta, Bengal Presidency, British India
- Died: 9 June 1993 (aged 77); Bombay, Maharashtra, India
- Occupations: Film director, screenwriter
- Years active: 1949–1987
- Spouse: Rubi Sen

Satyen Bose (22 January 1916 – 9 June 1993) was a film director from India. He has directed both Bengali and Hindi language films. Among his most notable films are Raat Aur Din, Chalti Ka Naam Gaadi, Dosti, and Jagriti. Jagriti won the Filmfare Best Movie Award in 1956 and Dosti won the same award in 1964.

Without any formal training in cinema, Bose rose to fame with his offbeat debut film Parivartan (1949). He remade the Bengali film in Hindi as Jagriti in 1954.

== Filmography ==
Year	Title	Language	Notes
1949	Parivartan	Bengali	Also played the character Shishir Babu
1951	Barjatri	Bengali	
1953	Bhore Hoye Elo	Bengali	
1954	Jagriti	Hindi	Also wrote screenplay
1954	Parichay	Hindi	
1955	Bandish	Hindi	
1955	Rikshawala	Bengali	
1957	Bandi	Hindi	
1958	Chalti Ka Naam Gaadi	Hindi	
1958	Savera	Hindi	
1958	Sitaron Se Aage	Hindi	
1960	Masoom	Hindi	
1960	Girl Friend	Hindi	
1964	Daal Me Kala	Hindi	
1964	Dosti	Hindi	Entered into the 4th Moscow International Film Festival.
1966	Aasra	Hindi	Also writer
1966	Mere Lal	Hindi	
1967	Raat Aur Din	Hindi	Also wrote screenplay
1969	Aansoo Ban Gaye Phool	Hindi	
1969	Wapas	Hindi	
1970	Jeevan Mrityu	Hindi	
1972	Anokhi Pehchan	Hindi	
1972	Mere Bhaiya	Hindi	
1972	Sa-Re-Ga-Ma-Pa	Hindi	
1973	Jyot Jale	Hindi	
1977	Mastan Dada	Hindi	
1978	Anmol Tasveer	Hindi	Also writer
1979	Saanch Ko Aanch Nahin	Hindi	
1980	Bin Maa Ke Bachche	Hindi	
1980	Payal Ki Jhankaar	Hindi	
1982	Tumhare Bina	Hindi	
1983	Kaya Palat	Hindi	
1987	Woh Din Aayega	Hindi	
