= Andolan (1951 film) =

1951 Indian socio-political film

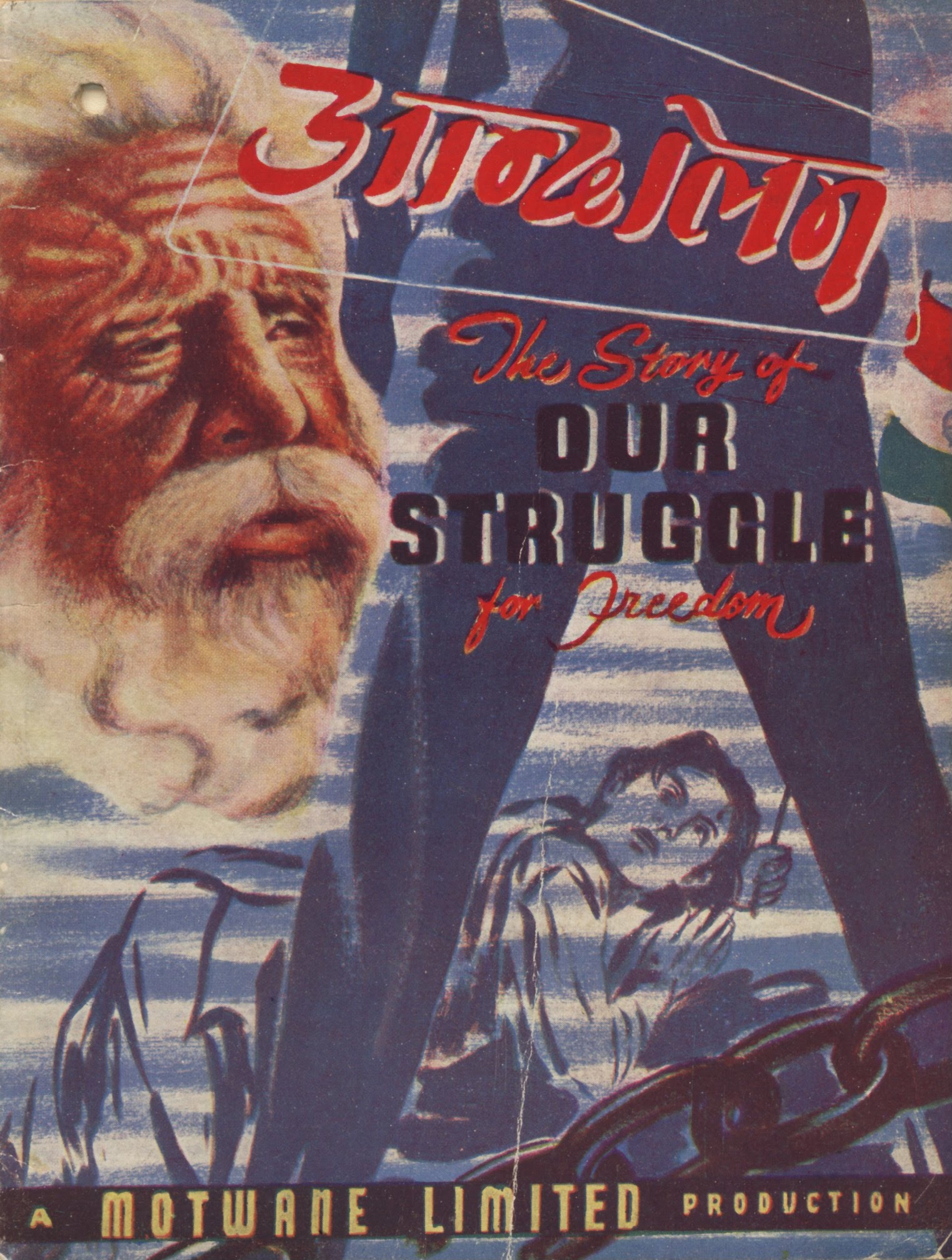
- Film poster
- Directed by: Phani Majumdar
- Written by: Phani Majumdar
- Produced by: Harnam Motwane
- Starring: Kishore Kumar; Nalini Jaywant; Sheikh Mukhtar
- Music by: Pannalal Ghosh
- Release date: 1951
- Country: India
- Language: Hindi

Andolan is a 1951 Indian socio-political film directed by Phani Majumdar and produced by Harnam Motwane. The film stars Kishore Kumar, Nalini Jaywant, and Sheikh Mukhtar in lead roles. The music was composed by Pannalal Ghosh. The film portrays the spirit of India's post-independence social movements and the aspirations of a newly free nation.

== Plot ==
Set in the early years of independent India, the film follows a group of young idealists who strive to bring social reform and justice to their community. The protagonist, portrayed by Kishore Kumar, is a passionate youth who challenges societal inequalities and inspires collective action. As the story unfolds, the characters navigate personal dilemmas and social resistance while holding onto their vision of a better nation.

== Cast ==
- Kishore Kumar as Raj
- Nalini Jaywant as Meena
- Sheikh Mukhtar as Shambhu
- Pratima Devi
- Chaman Puri

== Music ==
The film's music was composed by Ravi Shankar, blending classical Indian melodies with a patriotic theme. The songs reflect the emotional and ideological undertones of the story.

1. Prabhu Charnon Mein — Kishore Kumar
2. Subah Ki Pehli Kiran Tak — Kishore Kumar

== Legacy ==
Andolan is regarded as one of the significant early films in Kishore Kumar’s acting career, showcasing a serious side of the actor before his rise as a comic icon. The film also marks an important contribution to Indian cinema’s engagement with contemporary social issues during the 1950s.
