= Albela (1951 film) =

- Directed by: Bhagwan Dada
- Written by: Ehsan Rizvi
- Screenplay by: Bhagwan Dada
- Story by: Bhagwan Dada
- Produced by: Bhagwan Dada
- Starring: Bhagwan Dada; Geeta Bali
- Cinematography: Shanker A. Palav
- Edited by: G. G. Patil
- Music by: C. Ramchandra
- Production company: Bhagwan Art Productions
- Distributed by: Bhagwan Art Productions
- Release date: 1951
- Country: India
- Language: Hindi

Albela is a 1951 Bollywood musical comedy film directed by and starring Bhagwan Dada and Geeta Bali. A Hindi classic, it was the third highest-grossing film at the Indian Box Office in 1951 and its soundtrack by C. Ramchandra was acclaimed.

The film was later dubbed in Tamil as Nalla Pillai (Tamil: நல்லப் பிள்ளை) in 1953.

According to film critic S. Jahnvi, Albela inspired the titles of subsequent Hindi comedies such as Albela Mastana (1967) and Albela (1971).

== Plot ==
Day-dreamer and Artist, Pyarelal, lives a poor lifestyle in Bombay with his retired dad; housewife mom; married brother, Mohan and his wife, Malti; and unmarried sister, Vimla. It is now time for Vimla to get married, her dad has saved a thousand Rupees, while Mohan has made arrangements for six hundred more, and Pyarelal is asked to arrange for four hundred. Instead Pyarelal brings home one hundred rupees, informing his family that he has been fired from his job, and will be unable to raise any more money. An argument ensues, and Pyarelal is asked to leave. He leaves, swearing only to return when he is a famous and wealthy man. He meets with a pretty actress, Asha, both fall in love with each other, and he starts acting in theater, and achieves quick success. He starts sending money and gifts home to his parents, and hopes that they will be pleased with his success. Then one day when he feels that he has achieved his success, he returns home - only to find out that the money and gifts he has been sending home are missing; his mom has passed away; his dad and sister are missing, believed to be begging in the streets; his sister's marriage has been canceled; his brother cannot support himself. When he sees his brother's condition, he informs him about all the money orders he was sending. His brother was surprised that money order was coming regularly but he has not received any. When he confronts his wife, his wife reveals it was her brother who was taking the money leaving them penniless. Right then, her brother arrives to hide, running from police arrest for murder. Fight ensues between her brother and Pyare. Finally police arrests him. Then Pyare searches for his father and sister on the street. When they are about to meet, Pyare met with an accident. In the meanwhile, Asha was also searching for Pyare. She heard about the accident and about to head for hospital. At that moment, Pyare's father and sister approaches her and ask her to take them to Pyare. After knowing about their identity, she took them to hospital. In the meanwhile, at the hospital, Pyare regains senses. His friend informs him that Asha is going to act with some other lead in theater. He becomes angry and leaves hospital. When Asha and Pyare's relatives reach hospital, they cannot find him. Asha leaves for theater. There, Pyare confronts her about the lead change and doubts her and raises his hand on her. He was about to attack her when his father stops him and informs him about what length Asha has gone to find him as well as she was the reason that he had met Pyare. After hearing this, Pyare has change of heart and he goes back to Asha.

== Cast ==
- Geeta Bali as Asha
- Bhagwan as Pyarelal
- Badri Prasad as Pyarelal's Father
- Sundar as Theatre Owner
- Pratima Devi (Hindi actress) as Pyarelal's Mother
- Dulari as Malti
- Bimla as Vimla
- Usha Shukla
- Nihal
- Maruti as Drummer
- Shyamu
- Baburao as Malti's brother

== Soundtrack ==
The music director of the film was C. Ramchandra and the soundtrack was acclaimed, cited as a "classic". The film features several westernized songs such as Shola Jo Bhadke and Ye Deewana, Ye Parwana which are said to have "employed cabaret type dance/choruses featuring bongo drums, oboes, clarinets, trumpets, saxophones, etc." C.Ramachandra as Chitalkar himself sang most of the male songs in the movie while Lata Mangeshkar sang all the female songs. Apart from the highly popular Western-style songs, the movie also had classic melodies like "Dheere se aaja re ankhiyan me", "Balama bada nadan re" etc. The soundtrack "Qismat Ki Hawa Kabhi Naram" was used in Ludo, a 2020 Indian black comedy crime film written and directed by Anurag Basu in the opening credits, climax scenes & a few other parts. The original video parts from the film were also used in opening credits.

=== Hindi Songs ===
No.	Song	Singers	Lyrics	Length (m:ss)
1	"Dil Dhadke Nazar Sharmaye"	Lata Mangeshkar	Rajinder Krishan	03:07
2	"Dheere Se Aaja Ri Ankhiyon Mein"	Lata Mangeshkar & Chitalkar	Rajinder Krishan	03:21
3	"Shola Jo Bhadke"	Lata Mangeshkar & Chitalkar	Rajinder Krishan	03:31
4	"Shaam Dhale Khidki Tale"	Lata Mangeshkar & Chitalkar	Rajinder Krishan	03:42
5	"Balma Bada Nadan Re"	Lata Mangeshkar	Rajinder Krishan	02:57
6	"Deewana Parwana"	Lata Mangeshkar & Chitalkar	Rajinder Krishan	04:58
7	"Bholi Soorat Dil Ke Khote"	Lata Mangeshkar & Chitalkar	Rajinder Krishan	03:54
8	"Qismat Ki Hawa Kabhi Naram"	Chitalkar	Rajinder Krishan	03:53
9	"Haseenon Se Muhabbat Ka Bura Anjaam"	Chitalkar	Rajinder Krishan	02:59
10	"Diwana Aagaya"	Lata Mangeshkar & Mohammed Rafi	Rajinder Krishan	03:07
11	"Teri Yaad Ne Mara"	Lata Mangeshkar & Chitalkar	Rajinder Krishan	03:44

Two songs are set in Hindustani ragas: "Shaam Dhale Khidki Tale" (Pahadi) and "Dheere Se Aaja Ri Ankhiyon Mein" (Pilu).

=== Tamil Songs ===
No.	Song	Singers	Lyrics	Length (m:ss)
1	"Nenjam Thidukkena Nilai Thadumaari"	P. Leela		03:07
2	"Egaandha Raajaa Nee Aanandhame"	P. Leela		03:21
3	"Joraka Paadi Anbaaka Aadi"	T. M. Soundararajan & M. S. Rajeswari		03:31
4	"Aaambale Nee Jannal Kitte"	A. M. Rajah & P. Leela		03:42
5	"Priyamaai Mahaaraajaa"	P. Leela		02:57
6	"En Aasai Raadhaa Nee Aanandhame"	A. M. Rajah & P. Leela		04:58
7	"Thozhi Un Kann Edhiril Kodi"	T. M. Soundararajan & M. S. Rajeswari		03:54
8		P. Leela		03:35
9	"Oh Paattaali Antho Paavi Nee"	A. M. Rajah		03:53
10		A. M. Rajah		02:59
11	"Mai Vizhi Mel Paaindhu Odiye"	A. M. Rajah & P. Leela		03:07
12	"Mani Aditthadhanaal Anda Tikku Tikku Tikku"	A. M. Rajah & P. Leela		03:44
