= Aabshar =

1953 Indian film

- Directed by: Hasrat Lucknowi
- Starring: Nimmi; Kuldip Kaur; Raaj Kumar
- Music by: Mohammed D. Shafi
- Production company: Globe Pictures
- Release date: 1953
- Country: India
- Language: Hindi

Aabshar is a Bollywood romantic drama film directed by Hasrat Lucknowi. The film was released in 1953 under the banner of Globe Pictures.

== Cast ==
- Nimmi
- Kuldip Kaur
- Raaj Kumar
- Iftekhar
- Lalita Pawar

== Music ==
The music of the film was composed by Mohammed D. Shafi, while lyrics were written by Wahid Qureshi.

1. "Chale Aao Tumhe Aansu" - Lata Mangeshkar
2. "Hamaare Yaad Karte Hai" - Munawar Sultana
3. "Dil Par Sau Sau Baar" - Munawar Sultana
4. "Koi Sun Ke Kya Karega" - Lata Mangeshkar
5. "Mujhko Hai Tumse Pyaar Kyon" - Lata Mangeshkar
6. "Mujhko Hai Tumse Pyaar Kyon" v2 - Rajkumari
7. "O Dil Churanewaale Is Dil Ko" - Asha Bhosle
8. "Tere Gham Ko Chhupana Hai" - Munawar Sultana
9. "Yeh Duniya Soot Boot Ki Baabu" - Kishore Kumar, S. D. Batish, S. Balbir
