= Commander (film) =

1981 Hindi film

Commander is a Hindi-language action drama film directed and produced by Rakesh Kumar. This film was released on 2 October 1981 under the banner of Shanti Doot Chitra. It starred Amjad Khan in the lead role and Amitabh Bachchan played a truck driver, appearing in a cameo appearance, only to help out his friend Amjad to promote the movie. Music direction of the film was done by Kalyanji-Anandji.

== Cast ==
- Amjad Khan as Commander Singh
- Tanuja as Sheela
- Arun Govil as Inspector Arun
- Aruna Irani as Chameli
- Jeevan as Jagan
- Abhi Bhattacharya as Police commissioner
- Pinchoo Kapoor
- Vikas Anand
- Bharat Bhushan
- Mohan Choti
- Amitabh Bachchan as Truck Driver (Cameo appearance)

== Soundtrack ==
All songs were composed by Kalyanji–Anandji and penned by Anjaan.

- "Tu Pappa Ka Beta Hai" - Mahendra Kapoor, Asha Bhosle, Poornima
- "Mere Yaar Bina Pyar" - Kishore Kumar, Anwar
- "Itni Jaldi Kya Hai" - Asha Bhosle
- "Dance Music"
- Duniya Wale" (Part-1) - Manhar Udhas
- Duniya Wale" (Part-2) - Manhar Udhas
