= Ladki Jawan Ho Gayi =

- Directed by: Anand Dasani
- Release date: 1977
- Country: India
- Language: Hindi

Ladki Jawan Ho Gayi is a 1977 Indian Hindi-language film directed by Anand Dasani.

== Cast ==
- Sujit Kumar
- Manorama
- Rita Anchan

== Music ==
1. "Sunlo Are Deewano" – Kishore Kumar, Asha Bhosle
2. "Saath Hum Tum Chale The Yahi To Kahi" – Mohammed Rafi
3. "Ek To Vaisi Hi Deewani" – Asha Bhosle
4. "Jawani Hoti Hai Sau Aftaab Ka Jaadu" – Asha Bhosle, Mahendra Kapoor
