= Albela (1971 film) =

- Directed by: A. Shamsher
- Produced by: Sanat Kothari
- Starring: Mehmood; Aruna Irani
- Music by: Shankar – Jaikishan
- Distributed by: Everest Entertainment Pvt. Ltd.
- Release date: 1971
- Country: India
- Language: Hindi

Albela is a Bollywood film released in 1971. It was directed by A. Shamsher and produced by Sanat Kothari.

Film critic S. Jahnvi described Albela as one of two comedies bearing the title inspired by the 1951 hit of the same name, the other being Kishore Kumar-starrer Albela Mastana (1967).

== Synopsis ==
Mahesh, a stage artist, receives a telegram of his father's last hours on the stage but he refuses to leave the play half way, and goes home after the show is over. His father takes a promise from his son that after his death he would facilitate his sister's marriage in a highly reputed and wealthy family.

His friend Jago finds a prince named Sunil, son of Sardar Gajraj Singh Ghansu. He also finds out that Sunil is a bachelor. In order to find appropriate attire for the proposal, he steals a king's costume from a theater. Drama ensues.

== Cast ==
- Mehmood as Mahesh
- Aruna Irani as Reshma
- Rajendra Nath as Gajraj's brother in law
- I. S. Johar as Pom Pom
- Achala Sachdev as Mahesh's mother
- Leela Mishra as Sunil's mother
- Lalita Kumari
- Baby Guddi as Neela
- Namrata (Introducing) as Kala
- Anwar
- Gajanan Jagirdar
- Ramesh Deo as Jeevan
- Dhumal as Thakur Gajraj Singh Ghasu
- Mukri as Landlady's husband
- Asit Kumar Sen as Accountant
- S. N. Banerjee as Gauri Shankar Ghaswala
- Mohan Choti as Shambhu
- Mirza Musharraf
- Johnny Whisky
- Dilip Dutt as Accountant
- Brahmachari
- Moolchand
- Daulat Ram
- Jerry
- Ram Swarup
- Bharat Parekh

Rest of cast listed alphabetically

- Anwar Ali as Hero
- Tun Tun as fat woman in swimming pool

== Soundtrack ==
The music has been directed by Shankar – Jaikishan.

=== Track listing ===
1. "Aye Mere Dil" – Kishore Kumar
2. "Main Hoon Albela" – Kishore Kumar
3. "Sultanon Ka Sultan" – Kishore Kumar, Mehmood
4. "Devta Mana Aur Pooja" – Lata Mangeshkar
5. "Ae Mere Dil (Sad)" – Kishore Kumar
6. "Devta Mana Aur Pooja (Sad)" – Lata Mangeshkar
7. "Tera Dil Mere Dil Se Jo Aan Mila" – Noor Jehan

== Versions and legacy ==
Albela is a recurrent classic name for Bollywood films, and they share similar themes. This version was antedated by Albela iteration. It was thereafter followed by Albela and Albela versions. These are musicals, with a Pyygmalion/My Fair Ladyesque cant.
