= Shiv Dayal Batish =

Indian musician (1914–2006)

- Also known as: Nirmal Kumar, Master Ramesh
- Born: 14 December 1914; Patiala, India
- Died: 29 July 2006 (aged 91); California, U.S.
- Genre: Bollywood music
- Occupations: Singer, Music Director
- Instruments: Vocal
- Years active: 1936 – 2006
- Label: Batish Records
- Formerly of: Ashwin Batish
- Website: http://www.sdbatish.com/

Shiv Dayal Batish (better known as S.D. Batish; 14 December 1914 – 29 July 2006.) was an Indian singer and music director born in Patiala, India. In 1964, S D Batish received the Tansen Award for best vocalist from Sur Singar Samsad.

== Career ==
Batish was a composer, playback singer, and music director for Hindi Film Music. He broadcast his first radio program in 1936, from the studios of All India Radio, Delhi. For the movie Dassi 1944, he scored the film and sang 3 songs in it: "Khaamosh Nigaahen Yeh Sunaati Hai," "Meri Aarzu Dekh Kya Chahta Hu," and "Ghar Baar Ujada". Batish also scored music for the movies Betab, Bahu Beti, Karwat, Naata, Toofan, Haar jeet, Tipu Sultan, Hum Bhi Kuch Kam Nahin, Betaab (1952), Amar Keertan, Hulare (1957) Punjabi movie and Zalim Tera Jawab Naheen.

While playing at a festival in Cardiff, Wales, he met Fenner Brockway, who then helped him immigrate to the United Kingdom in 1964.

In early 1965, Batish played vichitra veena for the incidental music used in The Beatles' feature film Help! Batish subsequently gave dilruba lessons to Pattie Boyd, the wife of Beatles guitarist George Harrison. He recorded a number of songs for the BBC, where he made regular radio and television appearances. He wrote the lyrics, composed the music, and sang for the theme song "Nai Zindagi Naya Jeevan" ("New Birth, New Life"), for the BBC television show Apna Hi Ghar Samajhiye ("Make Yourself at Home").

In 1968, Batish was hired to coach British actor Michael York for his role to play sitar in the movie The Guru.

In 1970, he moved to the USA to teach music at the University of California, Santa Cruz. He and his son Ashwin Batish founded the Batish Institute of Indian music and Fine Arts.

== Movies - Bollywood and Private ==
1. AABSHAR (1953)
2. AAHUTI 1950
3. AAYEE BAHAAR (Aai Bahar) 1946
4. AARSI 1946
5. AARZOO 1950
6. ADAA 1951
7. AMAR KEERTAN 1954
8. BAHU BETI 1952
9. BAALAM 1949
10. BALMAA
11. BANSARIAA 1949
12. BARSAAT KI RAAT
13. BASANT
14. BETAAB 1954
15. BHAAGAMBHAAB
16. BHOLI
17. BHOOL BHULAIYAAN
18. CHAAND KI DUNIYAAN
19. CHAAR DIN
20. CHARNON KI DAASI
21. CHORE
22. CHUNARIAA 1948
23. CHUPKE CHUPKE 1948
24. DAASI 1944
25. DHAMKI 1945
26. DAWLAT KE LIYE 1949
27. DIL KI DUNIYAA
28. DIRECTOR 1947
29. Do Shaahzaade
30. DUSHMAN
31. EED
32. EK ARMAAN MERAA
33. EK ROZ 1947
34. EK TERI NISHAANI
35. GARMAA GARAM
36. GEET GOVIND 1947
37. GHAR GHAR ME DIWAALI
38. GOWAANDHI
39. HAAR JEET 1956
40. HAMAARI MANZIL
41. HEER RAANJHAA 1948
42. HICHKOLE 1948
43. HOTEL
44. HULLAARE
45. HUM BHI KUCH KAM NAHIN
46. INSAAN
47. JAANVAR
48. JHUMKE
49. JORU KAA BHAAI
50. KAAMINI 1950
51. KAHAAN GAYE 1946
52. KAISE KAHOON 1945
53. KAISE KAHOON 1964
54. KANEEZ
55. KARWAT
56. KHAANDAAN
57. KHUSH RAHO
58. KUNDAN 1956
59. LAADLI 1948
60. LAHORE 1948
61. LAILA MAJNU 1945
62. LAAL NISHAAN
63. MADAARI 1950
64. MADMUST
65. MANMAANI 1947
66. MATWAALI 1949
67. MERI SURAT TERI AANKHEN
68. MUKLAAWAA
69. NAQAAB
70. Naataa
71. PAAPI 1946
72. PAGLI 1943
73. PAGLI DUNIYAA 1945
74. PANNA 1947
75. PATHAAN
76. PEHLI NAZAR 1945
77. POONAM KAA CHAAND
78. PYAAR KI MANZIL
79. RAAGINI
80. RAILWAY PLATFORM
81. REET 1947
82. RISHTAA
83. ROOP REKHAA
84. RUSTOM SOHRAB
85. SAAL MUBAARAK
86. SAAVAN BHAADON
87. SAAZISH
88. SAHARA
89. SANAM
90. SAAQI 1952
91. SHAALIMAAR 1946
92. SHAAM SAVERAA 1946
93. SHAHZAADI 1957
94. SHIRIN FARHAAD
95. SURAJ MUKHI 1950
96. TAKSAAL
97. TEES MAAR KHAN 1955
98. TIPU SULTAAN
99. TOHFAA 1947
100. TOOFAAN 1954
101. ZAALIM TERAA JAWAAB NAHIN
102. India Called Them - Music S D Batish
103. INDIA MY INDIA - Music S D Batish
104. Thirteen Faces of India - Music S D Batish
105. Film on Yoga - Music S D Batish
106. Letter from Thimpu
107. "HELP" by the Beatles - played Vichitra Veena

== Books Authored ==
- Ragopedia, V. 1 - Exotic Scales of North India (Book)
- Ragopedia Cassette - Accompaniment tape to Ragopedia V. 1 (Book)
- Ragopedia V. 2 - Exotic Scales of South India (Book)
- First 10 Thaat Raga Chalans - (Text and cassettes package)
- Raga Chalans V. 1 (A-C) - Expansions for all the ragas from A to C as given in the Ragopedia V. 1 (Book)
- Raga Chalans V. 2 (D-I) - Expansions for all the ragas from D to I as given in the Ragopedia V. 1 (Book)
- Raga Chalans V. 3 (J-K) - Expansions for all the ragas from J to K as given in the Ragopedia V. 1 (Book)
- Raga Chalans V. 4 (L-M) - Expansions for all the ragas from L to M as given in the Ragopedia V. 1 (Book)
- Raga Chalans V. 5 (N-R) - Expansions for all the ragas from N to R as given in the Ragopedia V. 1 (Book)
- Raga Chalans V. 6 (S) - Expansions for all the ragas under S as given in the Ragopedia V. 1 (Book)
- Raga Chalans V. 7 (T-Y plus some rare ragas) - Expansions for all the ragas from T to Y plus a collection of rare ragas not previously listed in the Ragopedia V. 1 (Book)
- Rasik Raga Lakshan Manjari V. 1 - History and Theory of North Indian Music with Lakshan Geets (introductory songs written in English) for the First Ten Thaats of the North Indian classical music system written in staff and sargam notations (Book)
- First Ten Thaat Raga Lakshan Geet - Written, composed and sung by S. D. Batish (Cassette and CD)
- Rasik Raga Lakshan Manjari V. 2 - 100 further Lakshan Geet, 10 per Thaat written in staff and sargam notations (Book)

== Audio CDs ==
- Om Shanti Meditation - Dilruba (Cassette/CD)
- Ram Bhajans - Hindu Devotional Songs (Cassette/CD)
- 72 Carnatic Melakarta of South India - volume 1 (Cassette/CD)
- Raga Todi - Alaap and Bhajan "Jai Jia Mahadeva" (Cassette/CD)
- Asavari Thaat Ragas Lakshan Geet (Cassette/CD)
- Bhairava Thaat Raga Lakshan Geet (Cassette/CD)
- Bhairavi Thaat Raga Lakshan Geet (Cassette/CD)
- Bilaval Thaat Raga Lakshan Geet (Cassette/CD)
- Kafi Thaat Raga Lakshan Geet (Cassette/CD)
- Kalyan Thaat Raga Lakshan Geet (Cassette/CD)
- Khammaj Thaat Raga Lakshan Geet(Cassette/CD)
- Marava Thaat Raga Lakshan Geet (Cassette/CD)
- Pooravi Thaat Raga Lakshan Geet(Cassette/CD)
- Todi Thaat Raga Lakshan Geet (Cassette/CD)
