= Bipin Gupta =

Indian actor

- Born: 21 August 1905; Meerut, United Provinces of Agra and Oudh, British India
- Died: 9 September 1981 (aged 76); Kolkata, West Bengal, India
- Occupation: Actor

Bipin Gupta (21 August 1905 – 9 September 1981) was an Indian actor and artist during the 1930s and 1960s. He acted in Bengali and Hindi cinema, most notably in Baiju Bawra (1952), Jagriti (1954), Gharana (1961), Jeevan Mrityu (1970) and Khilona (1970).

== Early life ==
Gupta was born to a Bengali family on 21 August 1905 in Meerut, the 5th child of his parents Trailokya Nath Gupta and Khemankari Devi. They later moved to Barrackpore. He attended the Chinsura Training School and the Barrackpore Government High School. He was married to Annapurna Devi.

== Career ==
Gupta's first Bengali film was Chokher Bali, directed by Sotu Sen in 1938. Throughout his career, he had worked on almost 300 films, though he only played hero once, in the film Noori. In 1964, he produced and directed a Hindi movie which never got released. He started working in radio in 1934 and by 1936 he became a professional stage artist. He stayed for 30 years in Bombay to establish himself in Bollywood.

In 1964, he produced the film Daal Me Kala, directed by Satyen Bose and starring Nimmi, Kishore Kumar and Abhi Bhattacharya.

He died on 9 September 1981 in Kolkata.

== Selected filmography ==
- Cokher bali (1938)
- Gora (1938)
- Sandhi (1944)
- Grihalakshmi (1945)
- Suleh (1946)
- Pujari (1946)
- Sabyasachi (1948 film) (1948)
- Saqi (1952)
- Baiju Bawra (1952)
- Tamasha (1952)
- Miss Mala (1954)
- Jagriti (1954)
- Devta (1956)
- Sailaab (1956)
- Bhabhi (1957)
- Raj Tilak (1958)
- Savera (1958)
- Amar Deep (1958)
- Insan Jaag Utha (1959)
- Sasural (1961)
- Gharana (1961)
- Grahasti (1963)
- Mamta (1966)
- Amrapali (1966)
- Netaji Subhash Chandra Bose (1966)
- Majhli Didi (1967)
- Raja Aur Runk (1968)
- Pyar Ka Sapna (1969)
- Jeevan Mrityu (1970)
- Khilona (1970)
- Kasauti (1974)
- Kaala Sona (1975)
