= Yahudi =

1958 Indian film by Bimal Roy

- Directed by: Bimal Roy
- Written by: Wajahat Mirza
- Screenplay by: Nabendu Ghosh
- Based on: Yahudi Ki Ladki by Agha Hashar Kashmiri
- Produced by: Savak B. Vacha
- Starring: Dilip Kumar; Meena Kumari; Sohrab Modi; Nazir Hussain; Nigar Sultana
- Cinematography: Dilip Gupta
- Edited by: Hrishikesh Mukherjee
- Music by: Shankar Jaikishan
- Distributed by: Bombay Films
- Release date: 5 September 1958
- Running time: 170 minutes
- Country: India
- Language: Hindi

Yahudi (transl. Jew) is a 1958 Hindi-language epic romantic historical drama film directed by Bimal Roy. It stars Dilip Kumar, Meena Kumari, Sohrab Modi, Nazir Hussain, Nigar Sultana among others. It is based on the play Yahudi Ki Ladki by Agha Hashar Kashmiri, a classic in Parsi-Urdu theatre, about persecution of Jews in the Roman Empire in the empire's centre—Rome. The film was the third-highest grossing Indian film of 1958.

The film's lyricist Shailendra won the Filmfare Award for Best Lyricist at the 6th Filmfare Awards, for the song "Yeh Mera Diwanapan Hai", sung by Mukesh.

== Plot ==
Ezra is a jeweller who has a son named Elijah and a friendly butler and childminder called Emmanuel. At the beginning of the film, Ezra is due to leave on a trip. As he does, Elijah becomes upset and stands on the balcony. On the roads of the Jewish quarter, Brutus, Governor of Rome, is passing, making an announcement. A stone slips from Elijah's hand on the balcony and hits Brutus on the head. Brutus immediately gets Elijah arrested, and as Elijah is a Jew, sentences him to death. Hearing this, Ezra rapidly returns and begs Brutus to free Elijah, but Brutus feeds Elijah to hungry lions. Ezra returns to his house, mourning his son in an almost catatonic state. In revenge, Emmanuel kidnaps Lydia, the motherless daughter of Brutus, and takes her to Ezra. Ezra snaps out of his catatonic state when the girl starts to call him father, and he refuses to kill her and instead adopts her as his child.

Brutus' anger brews. He orders the guards to find his daughter, and calls for punishment of all Jews. Emmanuel helps Ezra and Lydia to escape the guards, who eventually break down the front door. Emmanuel claims to have murdered Lydia by feeding her to stray dogs, upon which the enraged guards kill him. Ezra remains hidden and raises Lydia, who grows up thinking she is Ezra's daughter and that her name is Hannah.

Fifteen years pass and Ezra grows to become a successful jeweller, well known to be so good and a Jew. Hannah grows into a beautiful young lady and attracts attention from many. The Roman emperor arrives in Rome for the marriage of his son Prince Marcus to Brutus' niece Princess Octivia.

However, Prince Marcus avoids talking about his wedding and opposes it. One day, when returning from a hunting trip, he is injured and is cared for by Hannah. He then disguises himself as a Jew and goes back into the Jewish neighbourhood. He rescues Hannah from the unwanted attentions of a Roman soldier and meets her father, Ezra, not as Prince Marcus but as Moshe, a successful Jew from Alexandria. Ezra is happy to meet him and "Moshe" and Hannah fall in love. However, Hannah soon notices that something isn't right. Prince Marcus then reveals who he is, making Hannah very upset at his dishonesty, and she banishes the Prince from her life.

Then comes the day of the wedding of Prince Marcus and Princess Octivia. Everyone is invited. Before the ritual could commence, Hannah shouts that she had been cheated by a Roman. Ezra joins in to get back at his enemy Brutus. He clamours for justice. The Emperor demands the name of the culprit and Hannah claims it is Prince Marcus. Brutus tries to rebut Hannah and Ezra, but the Emperor insists that justice must be done. Heartbroken, Hannah returns home.

She is followed by Princess Octivia. Hannah sees the Princess at her doorstep and denies her entry. Hannah knew the princess would beg for the Prince's life. However, the princess tells Hannah that the Prince will be sentenced to death the very next day. Early the next day, without warning, Hannah takes Ezra with her to the Emperor. There she recants her accusation of the prince. She tells the Emperor that the man that cheated was not the prince but a look-alike. Ezra is shocked, and Brutus, filled with joy, sentences Hannah and Ezra to death. They are to be thrown into a cauldron of boiling oil that very day, in front of the Prince. Unable to bear that his beloved will be burnt in front of him, Prince Marcus blinds himself, then goes to the cauldron chamber.

Ezra bes for Hannah's life, and Hannah is trying to reason with Ezra that she'd rather die than live a life of hate. But Brutus stops at nothing and wants the two to die. Immediately, Ezra tells Brutus that he knows where the Governor's lost daughter is. Brutus is confused and says that this is Ezra's revenge and accuses the Jew of lying. Ezra sarcastically agrees. Brutus still begs Ezra for his daughter's whereabouts and Ezra will only reveal it on one condition: Hannah is to be thrown into the cauldron as soon as Brutus finds out who his daughter is. Ezra tells Brutus and the confused Hannah that Hannah is Brutus' daughter and the Jew tells the guards to throw Hannah into the boiling oil. Brutus orders them to stop. Ezra looks at Hannah and dies. Hannah cries over her foster father's dead body. Brutus tells Hannah not to cry, but Hannah does not listen. She runs away from Brutus looking for the Prince. Shocked to find him blind, Hannah lends him support and helps him as the two disappear into the distance.

== Cast ==
The cast has been listed below:

- Sohrab Modi as Ezra Johari
- Dilip Kumar as Shehzada Marcus
- Meena Kumari as Hannah / Lydia
- Nigar Sultana as Shehzadi Octavia
- Nazir Hussain as Brutus
- Anwar Hussain as Antonio
- Minu Mumtaz as Ruth
- Tiwari as Emmanuel
- Murad as Emperor
- Indira as Yasmine
- Baby Naaz as Young Lydia
- Helen as Dancer / Singer
- Cuckoo as Dancer / Singer
- Kamala Laxman as Wedding Dancer / Singer

== Production ==
Yahudi was based on the 1913 play of the same name by Agha Hashar Kashmiri. Another adaptation, Yahudi Ki Ladki, directed by S. D. Narang and starring Madhubala, Pradeep Kumar and Gajanan Jagirdar, was released in 1957. The two films were developed around the same time, although Narang's version preceded Roy's, which was released in 1958.

Roy's film has been described as "the play's most enduring adaptation".

== Soundtrack ==
No.	Title	Lyrics	Singer(s)	Length
1.	"Aansoo Ki Aag Leke Teri Yaad Aayi"	Hasrat Jaipuri	Lata Mangeshkar	03:50
2.	"Aate Jaate"	Shailendra	Lata Mangeshkar	04:04
3.	"Dil Mein Pyar Ka Toofaan"	Shailendra	Lata Mangeshkar	04:30
4.	"Meri Jaan Meri Jaan"	Shailendra	Lata Mangeshkar	03:11
5.	"Ye Duniya Hai Hamari Ye Duniya"	Shailendra	Mohammed Rafi	03:24
6.	"Yeh Mera Deewanapan Hai"	Shailendra	Mukesh	03:46
7.	"Bechain Dil Khoyi Si Nazar"	Shailendra	Geeta Dutt, Lata Mangeshkar	04:38
Total length:				27:23
