= Shehnai (1964 film) =

- Directed by: S. D. Narang
- Written by: Gulshan Nanda
- Produced by: S. D. Narang
- Starring: Biswajeet; Rajshree; Nirupa Roy; Rehman; Johnny Walker; Parveen Chowdhry; Veena
- Cinematography: Sudhin Mazumdar
- Edited by: K. Nanda
- Music by: Ravi
- Release date: 1964
- Running time: 140 minutes
- Country: India
- Language: Hindi

Shehnai is a 1964 Indian Hindi family drama film directed by S. D. Narang. The film stars Biswajeet, Rajshree, Nirupa Roy, Leela Chitnis, Johnny Walker, Iftekhar and Asit Sen. The story was written by Gulshan Nanda and screenplay by Z. Hussain. The film's music was composed by Ravi. The songs "Na Jhatko Zulf Se Pani", "Kya Ajab Saaz Hai Yeh Shehnai", "Is Tarah Toda Mera Dil", "Kitni Jawan Hai Zindagi Kitni Jawan Bahaar" and others were written by Rajendra Krishan. The film is about a pilot's widow who goes through hardship and loneliness in order to fulfil her husband's last wish to make their son an Air Force pilot.

== Plot ==
The story starts in 1942 against the backdrop of war. Shobha (Nirupa Roy) and Asha (Veena) are friends married to two pilot officers (Rehman and Iftekhar respectively). Shobha is pregnant and her husband extracts a promise from her that if it's a boy she will make him join the Air Force. The next morning the families have to vacate the Air Force station due to war activities. The two pilots are killed when their plane is hit during a mission. Shobha lives with her mother-in-law in Kashmir and gives birth to Deepak. The grandmother fusses over and spoils Deepak. Shobha has to finally send Deepak to a boarding school as he gets into bad company and plays truant from school. The mother-in-law dies leaving Shobha alone to fend for herself. Deepak (Biswajeet) grows up to be an excellent student with a promising future in business. Against his own wishes he joins the Air Force when his mother reminds him of the promise she had made to his father.

Deepak meets Preeti (Rajshree) and they fall in love and plan to get married. Preeti's mother Asha, now remarried to a rich businessman (Sapru), is against the marriage as she is still haunted by the death of her first husband. She does not want Preeti to marry an Air Force pilot. Deepak refuses to leave the Air Force even if it means giving up Preeti. He cites his mother's sacrifices in order to give him a good education so that he could join the Air Force. He is sent to the front and gets injured. Preeti has left her home and joined the Red Cross as a nurse. She nurses Deepak back to health and they get married. They reach home to find that Preeti's mother has had a change of heart and is happy about their wedding.

== Cast ==
- Biswajeet as Deepak
- Rajshree as Preeti
- Nirupa Roy as Shobha (Deepak's Mother)
- Rehman as Pilot Officer Amarjeet (Shobha's Husband)
- Iftekhar as Pilot Officer (Amarjeet's Friend)
- Veena as Asha (Shobha's Friend & Preeti's Mother)
- Johnny Walker as Jaan Mohammad
- Parveen Chowdhry as Preeti's Friend
- Leela Chitnis ... Deepak's Grandmother
- Chand Usmani as Salma
- Sapru as Asha's Second Husband
- Honey Irani as Young Deepak
- Asit Sen
- Laxmi Chhaya
- Nazir Kashmiri

== Soundtrack ==
The music was composed by Ravi, with lyrics by Rajendra Krishan.

Song	Singer	Raga
"Na Jhatko Zulf Se Pani"	Mohammed Rafi	Pilu
"Kitni Jawan Hai Zindagi"	Mohammed Rafi	
"Kya Ajab Saaz Hai Yeh"	Mohammed Rafi	
"Sharmake Na Ja"	Mohammed Rafi	
"Sadiyon Purani Apni Kahani, Mohabbat Ise Aaj Kaha"	Mohammed Rafi, Asha Bhosle	
"Is Tarah Toda Mera Dil"	Asha Bhosle	
"Pawan More Angna Mein"	Asha Bhosle	

== Awards ==
- Filmfare Best Supporting Actress Award 1965 for Nirupa Roy
