= Yahudi Ki Ladki (1957 film) =

1957 film

- Theatrical release poster
- Directed by: S. D. Narang
- Based on: Yahudi Ki Ladki (1913) by Agha Hashar Kashmiri
- Starring: Madhubala; Pradeep Kumar; Gajanan Jagirdar
- Music by: Hemant Kumar; S. H. Bihari (lyrics)
- Production company: New Oriental Pictures
- Release date: 9 February 1957; (Bombay)
- Country: India
- Language: Hindi

Yahudi Ki Ladki (transl. 'The Jew's Daughter') is a 1957 Indian Hindi-language historical drama film directed by S. D. Narang. Based on the 1913 play of the same name, it stars Madhubala (in the titular role) along with Pradeep Kumar and Gajanan Jagirdar. The film premiered in Bombay on 9 February 1957, received mixed reviews, and became a commercial success.

== Plot ==
In ancient Egypt, a tyrannical Pharaoh (Hiralal) orders the execution of a Jewish blacksmith's young son following an accidental insult. Bearing the tragedy with fortitude and faith in the prophet Abraham, the blacksmith (Gajanan Jagirdar) saves the Pharaoh's infant daughter the same night and kidnaps her to raise as his own, naming her Farida, as an act of retribution.

Years later, a grown-up Farida (Madhubala) attracts the romantic attention of Sajjad (Pradeep Kumar), the commander of the Pharaoh's army, who enters her home in the line of duty. Finding that Farida dislikes him in his military attire, Sajjad disguises himself as a poor Jew and takes a job at her foster father's blacksmith workshop to earn her affection.

Eventually, Sajjad's true identity is revealed, leading to his imprisonment by a scheming Syrian queen (Smriti Biswas) holding captive status in Egypt. Concurrently, the Pharaoh (Hiralal) discovers Sajjad's affiliation with Farida, believing her to be the daughter of a Jewish rebel.

When the Pharaoh refuses to believe the blacksmith's declaration that Farida is his biological daughter and prepares to execute her, a massive natural disaster strikes, causing volcanic eruptions and earthquakes. The Pharaoh and his court perish in the destruction, while Farida, Sajjad, and the blacksmith survive to reunite.

== Cast ==
- Madhubala as Farida
- Pradeep Kumar as Sajjad
- Gajanan Jagirdar as the Jewish blacksmith (Farida's foster father)
- Hiralal as the Pharaoh (Farida's biological father)
- Smriti Biswas as the Syrian queen
- Krishna Kumari
- Helen
- Tun Tun
- Amar
- Sheela Vaz
- Premlata

== Production ==
Yahudi Ki Ladki is based on the 1913 play of the same name by Agha Hashar Kashmiri. The play had previously been adapted by Premankur Atorthy in a 1933 film, starring K. L. Saigal, Rattan Bai and Nawab Kashmiri. Another adaptation, Bimal Roy's Yahudi (1958), was made around the same time as Narang's version.

The film featured the dancing twins Lyn and Lys, reportedly from Egypt, who performed to Geeta Dutt's rendition of "Sammara".

== Music ==
The film's music was composed by Hemant Kumar, with lyrics penned by S. H. Bihari.

- "Hum Kisi Se Na Kahenge Chup Chup Se rahenge" – Geeta Dutt, Shamshad Begum
- "Ye Chand Bata Tune Kabhi Pyar Kiya Hai" – Asha Bhosle
- "Duniya Se Dil Lagake, Humse Aankhe Mila Ke" – Geeta Dutt
- "Aa Humse Pyar Kar Le" – Geeta Dutt
- "Ae Khuda Tere Bando Ke Dil" – Ravi, Hemant Kumar
- "Dil Bekarar Mera Kare Intezar Tera" – Hemant Kumar, Asha Bhosle
- "Kar Le Dil Ka Sauda Dil Se" – Geeta Dutt
- "Na Ho Dil Jiske Dil Me" – Geeta Dutt

== Release ==
The film premiered in Bombay on 9 February 1957.

=== Publicity ===
On 27 January 1957, The Bombay Chronicle featured Madhubala's image from the film on its front page, commenting:

What won't they think of next? They've now cast Madhubala as a Pharaoh's daughter who falls in love with a Jew from the opposite camp. For her versatility as the "Yahudi-ki-Larki" she gets our Sunday Star this week.

== Reception ==
A Times of India review, dated 10 February 1957, carried the headline: "Narang's Yahoodi Ki Ladki Is Grand Entertainment".

Baburao Patel of filmindia criticised the direction, acting performances, and production values, and named the film a "lethal lump of boredom". Patel also noted that the film lacked authentic Egyptian geography and culture.

Another review in Jana: The Newspaper of Resurgent Asia and Africa criticised Madhubala's performance, remarking that she "does little more in the film than give enough close-ups of her face", and dismissed Yahudi Ki Ladki as "an ignorable, if not ignoble, production".

=== Box office performance ===
The film was a commercial success.
