= Bombay Ka Chor =

- Directed by: S. D. Narang
- Produced by: New Oriental Pictures
- Starring: Kishore Kumar; Mala Sinha
- Music by: Ravi
- Release date: 1962
- Country: India
- Language: Hindi

Bombay Ka Chor is a 1962 Indian Hindi-language crime comedy film directed by S. D. Narang. It features a soundtrack composed by Ravi, and stars Kishore Kumar—who plays a dual role—and Mala Sinha. The black-and-white film also features a colour sequence titled "Holiday on Ice".

According to the authors of Kishore Kumar: The Ultimate Biography, the film's comedy drew inspiration from the Marx Brothers and Charlie Chaplin, and its ending was copied from the crop-duster sequence from Alfred Hitchcock's North by Northwest (1959).

Bombay Ka Chor premiered in Bombay on 1 June 1962. The film received negative reviews in several publications: Shankar's Weekly criticised the story and acting performances; The Times of India found it to be an "insipid hotchpotch"; while Mother India declared it "a most disgusting and idiotic picture".

== Cast ==
- Kishore Kumar
- Mala Sinha
- Honey Irani
- Helen
- Amar
