= College Girl (1978 film) =

- Directed by: S. D. Narang
- Produced by: Shantilal Soni
- Starring: Sachin; Bindiya Goswami; Bhagwan
- Music by: Bappi Lahiri
- Release date: 1978
- Country: India
- Language: Hindi

College Girl is a 1978 Hindi-language romantic crime thriller drama film directed by S. D. Narang. It's a remake of the 1976 American film Lipstick. Produced by Shantilal Soni, the film stars Sachin Pilgaonkar, Bindiya Goswami, Rita Bhaduri, Bhagwan, Paintal, and Shreeram Lagoo. The film's music is by Bappi Lahiri.

== Plot ==
The film is based on the lives of youth and their petty mistakes leading to the trouble of life. The story revolves around two sisters. The elder sister tries hard to earn money for her middle-class family, and the younger sister, the college girl, lives carelessly and eventually is cheated and raped by her lover. She files a case against him but cannot punish him because she needs proof. Her elder sister, who is a lawyer, tries to collect the evidence but is caught by the villain, and when he tries to rape her, the college girl, who was seeking vengeance for destroying her future, shoots and punishes him in the climax of the movie.

== Cast ==
- Sachin Pilgaonkar
- Bindiya Goswami
- Rita Bhaduri
- Bhagwan
- Paintal
- Shreeram Lagoo

== Soundtrack ==
All music is composed by Bappi Lahiri.

No.	Title	Lyrics	Singer(s)	Length
1.	"Pyar Manga Hai Tumhi Se"	Shiv Kumar Saroj	Kishore Kumar	05:06
2.	"College Girl I Love You"	Shiv Kumar Saroj	Kishore Kumar	05:35
3.	"Everybody Dance With Me"	S.D. Narang	Bappi Lahiri	02:55
4.	"Phoolon Ki Tarah"	Dev Kohli	Mohammed Rafi	04:52
5.	"Nahi Chahiye Rang Mahal"	Dev Kohli	Chandrani Mukherjee, K. J. Yesudas	04:34
6.	"Please Dear Please"	Hasrat Jaipuri	Bappi Lahiri	05:01
7.	"Jis Din Se Mai Bana Hu Dulha"	Verma Malik	Mahendra Kapoor	04:45
