= Do Ustad =

Do Ustad (lit. 'Two Masters') may refer to these Indian films:

- Do Ustad (1959 film), an Indian Hindi-language crime thriller film
- Do Ustad (1982 film), a Bollywood film
