= Do Thug =

1975 Indian film by S. D. Narang

- Film poster
- दो ठग
- Directed by: S. D. Narang
- Produced by: S. D. Narang
- Starring: Hema Malini; Shatrughan Sinha; Keshto Mukherjee
- Music by: Kalyanji Anandji
- Release date: 1975
- Country: India
- Language: Hindi

Do Thug is a 1975 Indian film directed by S. D. Narang. The film did well at the box office. It has a very popular song "Ye Duniya To Bas Paise Ki" by Asha Bhosle.

== Plot ==
_Do Thug_ is the story of two con-artists, *Ravi (Shatrughan Sinha)* and *Bijli (Hema Malini)*. They begin with petty crimes like pickpocketing and eventually start working for a notorious smuggler and criminal *Ranjit (Ajit)*, carrying out smuggling operations for him.

Ranjit murders a wealthy businessman *Madan Seth (Shatrughan Sinha in a double role)*. He frames *Ravi* for the murder and blackmails him into continuing to work for his criminal activities. Ranjit threatens to hand Ravi over to the police if he refuses to cooperate.

Meanwhile, *Bijli's* father *Brigadier Ram (Nisar Ahmad Ansari)* is also mysteriously murdered. During the investigation, it is revealed that Ranjit is also the killer of Bijli's father. Bijli seeks revenge for her father's death.

Ravi and Bijli gradually realize that Ranjit has destroyed both of their lives. Ravi discovers that Madan Seth, for whose murder he is blamed, was actually his lookalike. Police Inspector *Dheeraj (Dheeraj Kumar)* is also pursuing Ranjit's gang.

In the climax, Ravi and Bijli join forces to gather evidence against Ranjit. After a major confrontation, Ranjit is exposed. Ravi proves his innocence in court regarding the murder charge, and Ranjit is sentenced. At the end of the film, Ravi and Bijli decide to leave the world of crime and start a new life.

- Shatrughan Sinha plays a double role in the film*: 1. *Ravi*, a con-artist 2. *Madan Seth*, a businessman who is murdered.

== Cast ==
- Shatrughan Sinha as Madan and Ravi
- Hema Malini as Reena
- Keshto Mukherjee as Jaggu
- Nisar Ahmad Ansari as Doctor
- Dev Kumar as Mr Kishori Lal
- Fariyal as Rita
- Ajit as Ranjit
- Durga Khote
- Maruti
- Madhu Malini as Shobha
- Kanan Kaushal as Mrs Padma Lal
- M. Rajan as Michael
- Dhirajkumar as Police Inspector Dhiraj

== Soundtrack ==
Lyrics: Rajendra Krishan

1. "Humne Karke Mohabbat" – Asha Bhosle, Kishore Kumar
2. "Lo Aaj Maine Chehre Se" – Asha Bhosle, Usha Timothy
3. "O Thandi Thandi Rut" – Asha Bhosle
4. "Ye Duniya To Hai Bas Paise Ki" – Asha Bhosle
