= Smriti Biswas =

Indian actress (1924–2024)

- Biswas in 1953
- Born: 17 February 1924; Calcutta, Bengal Presidency, British India (now Kolkata, West Bengal, India)
- Died: 3 July 2024 (aged 100); Nashik, Maharashtra, India
- Occupation: Actress
- Years active: 1930–1961
- Spouse: S. D. Narang

Smritirekha Biswas (17 February 1924 – 3 July 2024), commonly known as Smriti Biswas, was an Indian film actress.

== Life and career ==
Biswas was born into a Christian family as Smritirekha Biswas, on 17 February 1924.

Biswas worked in many Hindi, Marathi, and Bengali films. She debuted in the film world as a child artist with Bengali movie Sandhya in 1930. She worked in the films of Guru Dutt, V Shantaram, Mrinal Sen, Bimal Roy, BR Chopra, and Raj Kapoor. She also acted with Dev Anand, Kishore Kumar, Uttam Kumar, Balraj Sahni, and other notable artists in various films. Biswas retired from acting after marrying film director S. D. Narang in 1960. She last appeared in the Hindi film Modern Girl (1961), directed by R. Bhattacharya. After her husband's death, she lived a life of poverty in Nashik. Biswas had two sons, Rajeev and Satyajeet.

Biswas turned 100 on 17 February 2024, and died in Nashik, Maharashtra on 3 July.

== Filmography ==
Year	Title	Role	Language	Notes
1933	Dondo		Bengali	As Child Artist
1933	Kaberi		Bengali	
1937	Mukti		Hindi	
1943	Dwanda		Bengali	
1944	Udayer Pathey		Bengali	
1944	Sandhya		Hindi	
1945	Ragni		Hindi	
1945	Dhamki		Hindi	
1947	Yeh Hai Zindagi		Hindi	
1947	Bidai		Bengali	
1948	Opobda		Bengali	
1948	Ek Aurat		Hindi	
1948	Nek Dil		Hindi	
1948	Roop Rekha		Hindi	
1948	Chhaya Path		Hindi	
1948	Chittagong		Hindi	
1949	Abhimaan		Hindi	
1950	Nai Bhabhi		Hindi	
1950	Pehla Aadmi		Hindi	
1950	Ek-Sho-Noi Dhara		Bengali	
1950	Maryada		Bengali	
1951	Maldar		Hindi	
1952	Nirakshar		Bengali	
1952	Anurag		Bengali	
1952	Abu Hossain		Bengali	
1952	Biresh Lahiri		Bengali	
1952	Minoti		Bengali	
1953	Chalis Baba Ek Chor		Hindi	
1953	Humdard		Hindi	
1953	Humsafar		Hindi	
1953	Shamsheer		Hindi	
1953	Teen Batti Char Raasta		Hindi	
1954	Bhai Sahab		Hindi	
1954	Chandni Chowk		Hindi	
1954	Shaheed-e-Azad Bhagat Singh		Hindi	
1955	Abe-Hayat		Hindi	
1955	Baap Re Baap		Hindi	
1955	Laakon Mein Ek		Hindi	
1955	Sau Ka Note		Hindi	
1955	Shikar		Hindi	
1955	Rajkanya		Hindi	
1955	Duniya Gol Hai		Hindi	
1956	Aabroo		Hindi	
1956	Arab Ka Saudagar		Hindi	
1956	Badshah Salamat		Hindi	
1956	Ek Din Raatre		Bengali	
1956	Bhagam Bhag		Hindi	
1956	Jagte Raho		Hindi	
1956	Sailaab		Hindi	
1956	Taj Aur Talwar		Hindi	
1956	Taksaal		Hindi	
1957	Yahudi Ki Ladki		Hindi	
1957	Abhimaan		Hindi	
1958	Dilli Ka Thug		Hindi	
1958	Ragini		Hindi	
1959	Daaka		Hindi	
1959	Neel Akasher Neechey		Bengali	
1961	Modern Girl		Hindi	
