= Babul Ki Galiyaan =

- Directed by: S. D. Narang
- Written by: Z.Hussain
- Starring: Sanjay Khan; Hema Malini; Shatrughan Sinha
- Music by: Ravi
- Release date: 1972
- Country: India
- Language: Hindi

Babul Ki Galiyaan is a 1972 Hindi drama film directed by S. D. Narang. The film stars Sanjay Khan, Hema Malini and Shatrughan Sinha. The film's music is done by Ravi.

== Cast ==
- Sanjay Khan
- Hema Malini
- Shatrughan Sinha
- Manmohan Krishna
- Tun Tun
- Jagdeep

== Soundtrack ==
#	Song	Singer
1	"Ek Cheez Mangte Hain Hum Tumse"	Kishore Kumar, Asha Bhosle
2	"Mera Naam Hai Chaupati"	Mahendra Kapoor, Asha Bhosle
3	"Door Se Karna Nazara"	Asha Bhosle
4	"Pehle Suoongi, Phir Chakhi"	Asha Bhosle
5	"Bairi Chhod De Mera Rasta"	Asha Bhosle
