= Modern Girl (film) =

- Directed by: R. Bhattacharya
- Produced by: S. D. Narang
- Starring: Pradeep Kumar; Sayeeda Khan; Smriti Biswas
- Release date: 1961
- Country: India
- Language: Hindi

Modern Girl is a 1961 Indian Hindi-language film directed by R. Bhattacharya. The cast includes Pradeep Kumar, Sayeeda Khan and Smriti Biswas. The film was reviewed by The Times of India on 23 July 1961 under the title "Narang's Modern Girl Offers Thrilling Entertainment".

The film's soundtrack, composed by Ravi, features compositions sung by Mukesh and Suman Kalyanpur.

Modern Girl was the last Hindi film starring Smriti Biswas.

== Cast ==
- Pradeep Kumar
- Sayeeda Khan
- Smriti Biswas
- Johnny Walker
- Madan Puri
- Nalini Chonkar
- Tun Tun
- Bhagwan
- Helen
