= Yahudi Ki Ladki =

1913 play by Agha Hashar Kashmiri

Yahudi Ki Ladki (The Jew's Daughter) is a historical Urdu play by Agha Hashar Kashmiri, on the theme of persecution of Jews by the Romans. It was first published in 1913. The play became his best known work, and a classic in Parsi-Urdu theatre.

The play was originally inspired by and adapted from W.T. Moncrieff's 19th century play, The Jewess, and uses a mixture of Urdu, Khari Boli and even Braj Bhasha at places.

== Adaptations ==
The play was adapted several times in India, in silent films, the early talkies era and later, attesting to its popularity. Notably the play was made into a film Yahudi Ki Ladki (1933) by New Theatres Ltd. Calcutta, directed by Premankur Atorthy and starring K. L. Saigal. It was made into a film again in 1956 by Nanubhai Vakil and in 1957 by S. D. Narang, with Madhubala and Pradeep Kumar. In 1958 it was adapted again by noted director, Bimal Roy, as Yahudi starring Dilip Kumar, Meena Kumari and Sohrab Modi.

In 1981, theater director Nadira Babbar started her theater group Ekjute (Together) with the production of Yahudi Ki Ladki, which revived the Parsi theatre style.
