= Kismetwala =

- LP Records Cover
- Directed by: S. D. Narang
- Produced by: B. N. Narang; Rajiv Narang
- Starring: Mithun Chakraborty; Ranjeeta; Asha Parekh
- Music by: Bappi Lahiri
- Release date: 1986
- Running time: 135 minutes
- Country: India
- Language: Hindi

Kismetwala is a 1986 Bollywood Indian action film directed by S. D. Narang. It stars Mithun Chakraborty, Ranjeeta, and Asha Parekh in lead roles, along with Prem Chopra and Shakti Kapoor in supporting roles.

== Cast ==
- Mithun Chakraborty as Raja
- Ranjeeta Kaur as Anita
- Asha Parekh as Asha / Shobha
- Prem Chopra as Thakur Baldev Singh
- Shakti Kapoor as Ranjeet
- Sujit Kumar
- Kim

== Songs ==
Lyrics: Anjaan

Song	Singer
"Boogie Boogie"	Asha Bhosle, Bappi Lahiri
"Gajab Bhayo"	Amit Kumar
"Follow Me"	Sharon Prabhakar
"Mardon Ki Zaat Se Dariyo Ji"	Usha Mangeshkar, Chandrani Mukherjee, Abhijeet
