= Anmol Moti =

- Theatrical release poster
- Directed by: S. D. Narang
- Written by: H.A. Rahi (dialogues)
- Screenplay by: Z. Hussain
- Story by: S. D. Narang
- Produced by: S. D. Narang
- Starring: Jeetendra; Babita
- Cinematography: Sudhin Mazumdar; S.D. Narang
- Edited by: Keshav Nanda
- Music by: Ravi
- Production company: Narang Films
- Release date: 30 August 1969
- Running time: 122 minutes
- Country: India
- Language: Hindi

Anmol Moti (transl. Precious Pearl) is a 1969 Indian romantic action film, produced and directed by S. D. Narang for Narang Films banner. Starring Jeetendra, Babita and music composed by Ravi.

== Cast ==
- Jeetendra as Vijay
- Babita as Roopa
- Jayant as Gokul
- Jeevan as Charan Das
- Ifthekar as Doctor
- Jagdeep as Manik
- D.K. Sapru as Zamindar
- Rajendra Nath
- Tun Tun
- Veena as Lakshmi
- Aruna Irani
- Shabnam

== Soundtrack ==
The soundtrack was composed by Ravi and lyrics by Rajendra Krishan.

#	Song	Singer	Raga
1	"Aaja Raja Leke Baaraat"	Asha Bhosle	Pahadi
2	"Main Kya Se Ho Gayi"	Asha Bhosle	
3	"Koi Mera Bachpan"	Asha Bhosle	
4	"Ae Jaan-E-Chaman"	Mahendra Kapoor	
5	"Sehmi Sehmi Kahan Chali"	Mahendra Kapoor	
6	"Na Ro Laadli"	Manna Dey	
