= Jaal Saz =

- Directed by: Arvind Sen
- Produced by: Lalit Kala Mandir
- Starring: Kishore Kumar; Mala Sinha; Pran
- Music by: N. Dutta
- Release date: 1959
- Country: India
- Language: Hindi

Jaal Saz is a 1959 Indian Hindi-language comedy film directed by Arvind Sen. It stars Kishore Kumar, Mala Sinha and Pran. Kumar portrays a mischievous young man who repeatedly outwits the villain (Pran). The film's music was composed by N. Dutta.

A critic for Shankar's Weekly criticised the film for "underplay[ing] crime motif and [giving] more prominence to Kishore's romantic and comedy antics".

In a retrospective review in 1978, The Illustrated Weekly of India referred to Jaal Saz as one of Sen's weakest works, "a film that had absolutely nothing to recommend itself".

== Cast ==
- Kishore Kumar
- Mala Sinha
- Pran
- Nazir Hussain
- Achala Sachdev
- Asit Sen
- Helen
- Krishnakant
