= List of awards and nominations received by Kishore Kumar =

Kishore Kumar awards and nominations
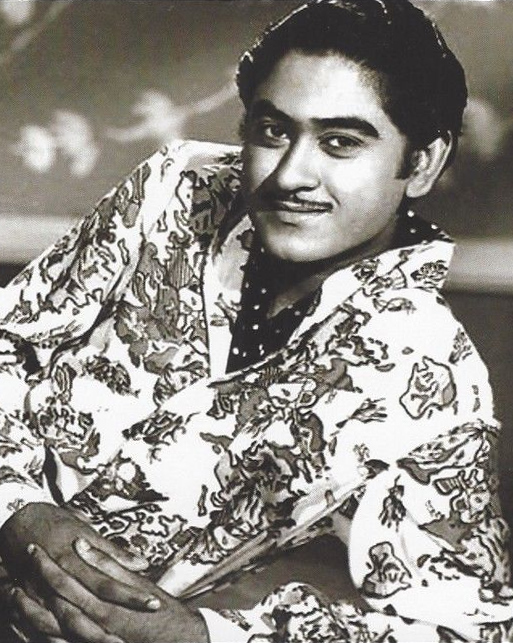
Awards and nominations
Award	Wins	Nominations
Filmfare Awards	8	28
Bengal Film Journalists' Association Awards	4	4
Lata Mangeshkar Award	1	1

Totals (Note: Certain award groups do not simply award one winner. They acknowledge several different recipients, have runners-up, and have third place. Since this is a specific recognition and is different from losing an award, runner-up mentions are considered wins in this award tally. For simplification and to avoid errors, each award in this list has been presumed to have had a prior nomination.)
- Wins: 13
- Nominations: 33

Kishore Kumar (born Abhas Kumar Ganguly; 4 August 1929 – 13 October 1987) was an Indian playback singer singer, musician, director, producer, lyricist and actor. He is widely regarded as one of the greatest, most influential and dynamic singers in the history of modern Indian music. Kumar was one of the most popular singers in the Indian subcontinent, notable for his yodelling and ability to sing songs in different voices. He has won most Filmfare awards for best playback singing. Besides Hindi, he sang in many other Indian languages, including Bengali, Marathi, Assamese, Gujarati, Kannada, Bhojpuri, Malayalam, Odia and Urdu. He also released a few non-film albums in multiple languages, especially in Bengali, which are noted as all-time classics.

== Filmfare Awards ==
Kishore Kumar has won eight Filmfare Awards for Best Male Playback Singer out of 28 nominations.

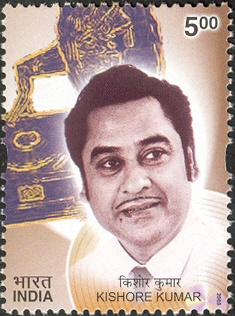
Kumar on a 2003 stamp of India

Filmfare Awards

Won:

Year	Song	Film	Music director	Lyricist
1970	"Roop Tera Mastana"	Aradhana	Sachin Dev Burman	Anand Bakshi
1976	"Dil Aisa Kisi Ne Mera"	Amanush	Shyamal Mitra	Indeevar
1979	"Khaike Paan Banaras Wala"	Don	Kalyanji Anandji	Anjaan
1981	"Hazaar Raahen Mudke Dekheen"	Thodisi Bewafaii	Khayyam	Gulzar
1983	"Pag Ghungroo Baandh"	Namak Halaal	Bappi Lahiri	Anjaan
1984	"Agar Tum Na Hote"	Agar Tum Na Hote	Rahul Dev Burman	Gulshan Bawra
1985	"Manzilein Apni Jagah Hain"	Sharaabi	Bappi Lahiri	Prakash Mehra
1986	"Saagar Kinaare"	Saagar	Rahul Dev Burman	Javed Akhtar

Nominated:

Year	Song	Film	Music director	Lyricist
1971	"Zindagi Ek Safar"	Andaz	Shankar Jaikishan	Hasrat Jaipuri
1971	"Yeh Jo Mohabbat Hai"	Kati Patang	Rahul Dev Burman	Anand Bakshi
1972	"Chingari Koi Bhadke"	Amar Prem	Rahul Dev Burman	Anand Bakshi
1973	"Mere Dil Mein Aaj"	Daag: A Poem of Love	Laxmikant–Pyarelal	Sahir Ludhianvi
1974	"Gaadi Bula Rahi Hai"	Dost	Laxmikant–Pyarelal	Anand Bakshi
1974	"Mera Jeevan Kora Kagaz"	Kora Kagaz	Kalyanji Anandji	M.G.Hashmat
1975	"Main Pyaasa Tum"	Faraar	Kalyanji Anandji	Rajendra Krishan
1975	"O Manjhi Re"	Khushboo	Rahul Dev Burman	Gulzar
1977	"Aap Ke Anurodh"	Anurodh	Laxmikant–Pyarelal	Anand Bakshi
1978	"O Saathi Re"	Muqaddar Ka Sikandar	Kalyanji Anandji	Anjaan
1978	"Hum Bewafa Harghiz"	Shalimar	Rahul Dev Burman	Anand Bakshi
1979	"Ek Rasta Hai Zindagi"	Kaala Patthar	Rajesh Roshan	Sahir Ludhianvi
1980	"Om Shanti Om"	Karz	Laxmikant–Pyarelal	Anand Bakshi
1981	"Hameh Tumse Pyar"	Kudrat	Rahul Dev Burman	Majrooh Sultanpuri
1981	"Chhookar Mere Mann Ko"	Yaraana	Rajesh Roshan	Anjaan
1983	"Shayad Meri Shaadi"	Souten	Usha Khanna	Sawan Kumar Tak
1984	"De De Pyar De"	Sharaabi	Bappi Lahiri	Anjaan
1984	"Inteha Ho Gayi"	Sharaabi	Bappi Lahiri	Anjaan
1984	"Log Kehete Hai (Mujhe Naulakha Manga De)"	Sharaabi	Bappi Lahiri	Anjaan

== Bengal Film Journalists' Association Awards ==
Kishore Kumar won Bengal Film Journalists' Association Awards (BFJA) 6 times. 4 times in Hindi and 2 times in Bengali.

Winner:

- 1966 - Best Male Playback Singer for Ektuku Choya Lage (Bengali)
- 1971 – Best Male Playback Singer for Aradhana (Hindi)
- 1972 – Best Male Playback Singer for Andaz (Hindi)
- 1973 – Best Male Playback Singer for Hare Rama Hare Krishna (Hindi)
- 1975 – Best Male Playback Singer for Kora Kagaz (Hindi)
- 1987 - Best Male Playback Singer for Abhimaan (Bengali)

Kishore Kumar acted in a Bengali film called Madhya Rater Tara (1961) directed by Pinaki Bhushan Mukherjee which had other bengali actors in the cast. Kishore Kumar also sang one song in that film. The film Madhya Rater Tara was the 4th best 1961 indian movie in order of merit by BFJA in the 25th Annual BFJA Awards.

Kishore Kumar made the movie called Door Gagan Ki Chhaon Mein (1964) in which he was the director, producer, writer, actor, singer, music director, and lyricist. The film Door Gagan Ki Chhaon Mein was the 8th best indian 1964 film in order of merit by BFJA in the 28th Annual BFJA Awards.

== Honours ==
He was awarded the Lata Mangeshkar Award by the Madhya Pradesh government in 1985. In 1997, the Madhya Pradesh Government initiated an award called the "Kishore Kumar Award" for contributions to Hindi cinema.

== See also ==
- Kishore Kumar filmography
- List of songs recorded by Kishore Kumar
