= Thilakam =

1960 film by Krishnan–Panju

- Theatrical release poster
- Directed by: Krishnan–Panju
- Written by: K. M. Narayanswami
- Based on: Thilakam by K. M. Narayanswami
- Produced by: M. Saravanan
- Starring: Prem Nazir; M. N. Rajam
- Cinematography: S. Maruthi Rao
- Edited by: Panjabi
- Music by: R. Sudarsanam
- Production company: AVM Productions
- Release date: 11 November 1960
- Country: India
- Language: Tamil

Thilakam is a 1960 Indian Tamil-language drama film directed by Krishnan–Panju, produced by AVM Productions and written by K. M. Narayanasami. Based on Narayanasami's play of the same name, the film stars Prem Nazir and M. N. Rajam. It was released on 11 November 1960 and failed commercially.

== Plot ==
Saraswathi is a woman separated from her husband. She and her daughter Thilakam take refuge in her sister's family in Tiruchi. Saraswathi wants her daughter Thilakam to be married to her brother Sekhar. But her uncle Sambasivam wants to marry Thilakam to a rich but old man in Bombay. Sambasivam's son Gunasekharan is against this plan and wants Thilakam to be married to Sekhar. Whether he succeeds in this, forms the plot of the story.

== Cast ==
The details are adapted from The Hindu review article.

- Prem Nazir
- M. N. Rajam
- Sriranjani Jr.
- R. Rajakumari
- D. Balasubramaniam
- V. K. Ramasamy
- Tambaram Lalitha
- "Kuladeivam" V. R. Rajagopal
- S. Rama Rao
- C. S. Pandian
- S. L. Narayanan
- Manorama
- "Appa" K. Duraiswami
- "Thilakam" K. M. Narayanasami
- Seethalakshmi
- Ramamani Bai
- Pakkirisami

== Production ==
Thilakam was a popular stage play written by K. M. Narayanasami. A. V. Meiyappan, the founder and then-owner of AVM Productions, bought the film rights to the play and produced the film. His son Saravanan started his film production career with this film working as a "production executive". Narayanasami wrote the film's dialogues.

== Soundtrack ==
Music was composed by R. Sudarsanam and the lyrics were penned by Kothamangalam Subbu, M. K. Athmanathan, A. Maruthakasi, Kavi S. Rajagopal and V. Seetharaman. The song "B-o-y Boy, Boyinna Paiyan, G – i – r – l Girl, Girlinna Ponnu" (based on the song "Cat Maane Billi" from the Hindi film Dilli Ka Thug), sung by S. C. Krishnan and Soolamangalam Rajalakshmi was a hit.

Partial List of Songs

Song	Singer/s	Lyricist	Length
"B-o-y Boy, Boyinna Paiyan"	S. C. Krishnan & Soolamangalam Rajalakshmi		03:52
"Manasukkulle Maraichu Vaikka Mudiyale"	Sirkazhi Govindarajan & M. L. Vasanthakumari	M. K. Athmanathan	03:43
"Aadi Varum Poonkodi Azhginile"	P. Susheela	A. Maruthakasi	03:47
"Ezhaikkum Vaazhvukkum Vegudhooramaa"	Seerkazhi Govindarajan, M. L. Vasanthakumari; T. S. Bagavathi	Kavi Rajagopal	04:38
"Kaaveri Karadhanile Kaaval Iruppavale"	T. M. Soundararajan	Kothamangalam Subbu	01:25
"Aayi Mahamaayi Perai Cholli"	S. C. Krishnan, L. R. Eswari & Soolamangalam Rajalakshmi	Kothamangalam Subbu	01:02
"Karagam Karagam Karagam"	S. C. Krishnan & Soolamangalam Rajalakshmi	Kothamangalam Subbu	01:34
"Maari Mutthu Maari"	T. M. Soundararajan & Soolamangalam Rajalakshmi	Kothamangalam Subbu	01:17
"Inneram Ennai Seidhe"	S. C. Krishnan & L. R. Eswari	Kothamangalam Subbu	01:38
"Bayaaskoppu Paatthiyaa Dappaskoppu Paatthiyaa"	T. M. Soundararajan & Soolamangalam Rajalakshmi	Kothamangalam Subbu	01:46
"Thanjavoor Karagamadi Oh Mariammaa"	S. C. Krishnan, Soolamangalam Rajalakshmi, L. R. Eswari & T. M. Soundararajan	Kothamangalam Subbu	01:22
"Kaathirundha Kannukku Oli Vandhadhu"	M. L. Vasanthakumari	Kavi S. Rajagopal	04:22
"Sandhegam Enum Oru Sarakku"	S. C. Krishnan & Soolamangalam Rajalakshmi		03:26

== Release and reception ==
Thilakam was released on 11 November 1960. The Sunday Standard appreciated the plot, performances and cinematography. Kanthan of Kalki appreciated the dialogues, but criticised the story, performances and songs. The film was a commercial failure.
