= Sagaai =

- Directed by: S. D. Narang
- Story by: Z.Hussain
- Starring: Biswajeet; Rajshree; Prem Chopra
- Music by: Ravi
- Release date: 1966

Sagaai is a 1966 Bollywood film starring Rajshree and Biswajeet.

== Plot ==
Sheel (Rajshree) and Kailash's (Prem Chopra) marriage is planned by Sheel's father. But fate takes her into the arms of Rajesh (Biswajeet), and they celebrate their engagement on Sheel's birthday. Rajesh meets with a car accident, conspired by Kailash, and is paralyzed waist down. Rai Sahebh refuses to acknowledge their engagement but Sheel adamantly leaves her home to be with the ailing Rajesh and marries him by Vedic rituals. She nurses him back to health, but is rudely preyed upon by Kailash, who wants to see the end of Rajesh. The film reflects upon the trails and travails of a woman whose husband is ill and paralyzed and she is desired by another man. A very beautiful dance number is performed by Sheel as Visha Kanya, very much before her life is thrown in such a turmoil.

== Cast ==
- Biswajit as Rajesh
- Rajshree as Sheel
- Prem Chopra as Kailash
- Rehman as Dr. Tandon
- Jayant as Dwarkanath
- Raj Mehra as Rai Sahib Raghu Prasad (Sheel's Father)
- Durga Khote as Sheel's Mother
- Rajendra Nath as Hariram 'Harry'
- Asit Sen as Bansi
- Tun Tun as Miss Anarkali
- Iftekhar as Hospital Doctor
- Helen as Dancer / Singer

== Soundtrack ==
Music is composed by Ravi, while Rajinder Krishan wrote the songs.

Song	Singer
"Sajan Tori Preet Raatbhar Ki"	Asha Bhosle
"Khaak Mein Mila To Kya, Phool Phir Bhi Phool Hai"	Asha Bhosle, Usha Mangeshkar, Usha Khanna
"Na Yeh Zameen Thi, Na Aasman Tha"	Asha Bhosle, Mohammed Rafi
"O Paape Na Sharma, Kuch Garmi Sardi Kha"	Mohammed Rafi
"Khafa Na Hona Agar Main Poochhun"	Mahendra Kapoor
"Husn Aur Ishq Ke Takrane Ki Raat Aayi Hai"	Mahendra Kapoor
