= Ramayan Tiwari =

Bollywood actor

Ramayan Tiwari was a Bollywood actor who was more famous by his surname Tiwari. He worked in approximately 125 movies in his 36 year long film career. He has worked in Bollywood movies like Madhumati, Yahudi, Jis Desh Mein Ganga Behti Hai, Mera Saaya, Kal Aaj Aur Kal and many more. He was originally from Maner of Patna, Bihar, and was also a freedom fighter. He died on 9 March 1980 in Mumbai. His son's name was Bhushan Tiwari, who too worked in bollywood movies as a character artist.

== Early life ==
Ramayana Tiwari was born in a zamindar Bhumihar family of Maner in Patna, Bihar.

== Career ==
In Mumbai, firstly he got a job in a studio named 'Prabhat Studio' where many films were photographed. Once, shooting of a movie named Man Mandir was going on in the studio in which a character artist was absent one day. Consequently, the director of the movie offered Tiwari the same role which he joyfully accepted. This was his first movie. Later, he acted in many many big movies like Bimal Roy's Madhumati, Yahudi etc., Raj Kapoor's Jis Desh Mein Ganga Behti Hai, Kal Aaj Aur Kal, Raj Khosla's Mera Saaya and many more movies.

== Filmography ==
Year	Title	Role	Notes
1941	Nirdosh	Writer	
1945	Ghulami		
1946	Phoolwari		
1947	Do Bhai		
1947	Meerabai		
1947	Gaon		
1948	Chanda Ki Chandni		
1948	Nai Reet		
1948	Khidki		
1948	Aasha		
1949	Kaneez		
1949	Dil Ki Basti		
1950	Aadhi Raat		
1950	Sangram	Pyarelal	
1950	Apni Chhaya		
1951	Aaram	Ramnath	
1952	Mordhwaj		
1952	Jalpari		
1952	Jaggu		
1953	Do Bigha Zamin	Paro's Molester	
1953	Parineeta	Doctor	
1953	Patita	Orphanage man	
1953	Aabshar		
1954	Ameer		
1954	Khaibar		
1954	Lal Pari		
1954	Naaz		
1954	Mastana	Police Inspector	
1954	Pensioner		
1954	Lakeeren		
1955	Shah Behraam		
1955	Darbaar		
1955	Alladin Ka Beta		
1955	Bara-Dari	Ranvir Singh, Thakur of Ajaygarh	
1955	Mast Qalandar		
1955	Vachan		
1955	Hatimtai Ki Beti		
1956	Qeemat		
1956	Jallad		
1956	Yahudi Ki Beti		
1956	Rajdhani		
1956	Bhagam Bhag		
1956	Kismet		
1956	Justice		
1956	Pocketmaar	Shankar	
1956	Bajrang Bali		
1956	Ram Navami		
1956	Panna		
1956	Roop Kumari		
1957	Khuda Ka Banda		
1957	Laxmi		
1957	Ram Lakshman		
1957	Naag Padmani		
1957	Changez Khan		
1957	Jannat		
1958	Madhumati	Bir Singh	
1958	Post Box 999		
1958	Yahudi	Emmanuel	
1958	Daughter of Sindbad		
1959	Satta Bazar		
1959	Baazigar		
1959	Kangan		
1959	Guest House		
1959	Commander		
1959	Do Behnen	Doctor	
1959	Mohar		
1959	Pyar Ki Rahen		
1959	Bhakt Prahlad		
1960	Lal Quila		
1960	Road no. 303		
1960	Miss Goodnight		
1960	Mud Mud Ke Na Dekh		
1961	Jis Desh Mein Ganga Behti Hai	Meerabai's husband	
1961	Ram Leela		
1961	Bhaiyya		
1961	Jadoo Nagri		
1961	Amar Rahe Ye Pyar	Bahadur	
1961	Sapera		
1962	Ek Musafir Ek Hasina		
1962	Ganga Maiyya Tohe Piyari Chadhaibo		
1962	Neeli Aankhen	Rai Bahadur	
1962	Hawa Mahal	Bhola	
1962	Shri Ganesh	Prachand	
1963	Ek Tha Alibaba		
1963	Cobra Girl	Shigali	
1963	Zingaro		
1963	Harishchandra Taramati		
1963	Been ka Jaadu		
1964	Badshah		
1964	Veer Bhimsen		
1964	Awara Badal	Mahamantri	
1964	Darasingh: Ironman		
1964	Main Suhagan Hoon	Thakur	
1964	Apne huye Paraye	Judge	
1964	Sati Savitri		
1964	Goswami Tulsidas	Shri Kalyug	
1965	Kaajal	Kalu Mali	
1965	Sikandar E Azam		
1965	Akashdeep		
1965	Noor Mahal	Veer Singh	
1966	Mera Saaya	Actor	
1966	Khoon Ka Khoon		
1966	Dilawar		
1966	Dada		
1966	Johar in Kashmir	Maula's dad	
1967	Patthar Ke Sanam	Thakur	
1967	Naseehat	Police Detective	
1968	Neel Kamal		
1968	Baharon Ki Manzil	Roy's goon	
1968	Izzat	Manglu	
1968	Vaasna	Sagarmal	
1968	Mera Naam Johar	Shankar	
1968	Watan Se Door		
1969	Chalbaaz		
1969	Aradhana		
1969	Nanak Naam Jahaz Hai	Doctor	
1969	Apna Khoon Apna Dushman		
1969	Anjan Hai Koyee	Sabhu	
1969	Raate Ke Andhere Mein		
1970	Humjoli	writer	
1970	Khilona		
1970	Mere Humsafar	Ustad Anwar	
1970	Ilzam	Pannalal	
1970	Kati Patang		
1970	Yaadgaar		
1970	Gopi	Hariram	
1970	Suhana Safar	Daku Mangal Singh	
1971	Aisa Bhi Hota Hai		
1971	Kal Aaj Aur Kal		
1971	Chingari		
1971	Preetam	Rana	
1971	Dushman		
1971	Ganga Tera Pani Amrit	Lambu Kaka	
1971	Johar Mehmood in Hong Kong		
1971	Veer Chhatrasal		
1972	Bhai Ho To Aisa	Dacoit	
1972	Rampur Ka Laxman		
1973	Loafer	Singh's agent	
1974	Pran Jaye Par Vachan Na Jaye	Money Lender	
1974	Majboor	Police Inspector	
1974	Dost	Gupta's ex secretary	
1975	Natak	Daya Ram	
1975	Jai Santoshi Mata		
1975	Geet Gata Chal	Jairam	
1975	Pratigya	Shambhu Prasad	
1975	Rafu Chakkar	2 duo	
1976	Naach Uthe Sansaar	Jaggu Mahto	
1976	Main Papi Tum Bakhshanhaar		
1977	Mera Vachan Geeta Ki Kasam	Sahukar	
1977	Aafat		
1977	Tinku	Kaaniya Begger	
1977	Yaaron Ka Yaar	Thakur Jaimangal	
1978	Ganga Ki Saugand	Munimji	
1980	Chambal Ki Kasam		
1983	Film Hi Film		
1984	Zakhmi Sher		
1988	Jeete Hain Shaan Se		
1989	Nigahen		
