= Door Waadiyon Mein Kahin =

- Directed by: Kishore Kumar
- Written by: Kishore Kumar
- Produced by: Kishore Kumar
- Starring: Kishore Kumar
- Release date: 1980
- Country: India
- Language: Hindi

Door Waadiyon Mein Kahin is a 1980 Indian Hindi-language film directed, produced, and written by Kishore Kumar, who also played the lead role. It revolves around a jailbird who struggles to integrate back into the realities of the outside world. Conceived in the late 1970s, the film also featured actresses Shyamalee and Bindu; and marked the Hindi film debut of actress Y. Vijaya.

Set in Kashmir, a substantial part of the film was shot around Gulmarg, including the Gulmarg–Tangmarg Road. The shoot took place in two phases under freezing conditions, with Bindu and Shyamalee reportedly fainting during filming in sub-zero temperatures.

Unlike his other films, Kumar decided not to feature any music in Door Waadiyon Mein Kahin, rather deciding to stick with only "natural sounds". Film writer Derek Bose calls it a decision that "defied reason and challenged the norms of mainstream Hindi cinema".

The film was reportedly unpopular with audiences. In a Times of India review published on 27 March 1983, critic Khalid Mohamed described the film as a "mess of crime, love, and deceit set against a snowy backdrop that left you strangely ice-cold".
