= Aavani Kanavukal =

Studio album by Bombay Ravi
- Released: 1997

Aavani Kanavukal (1997) is a Malayalam studio album by Bombay Ravi. The lyrics for this album was penned by Yusuf Ali Kecheri.

== Track list ==
#	Title	Singer(s)	Other note(s)
1	"Chundathu Thenulla"	Manoj Krishnan	Raaga: Madhyamavathi
2	"Malanaattil Ponnonam"	Unni Menon	
3	"Neerani Kaatte Nadodi"	Daleema	Raaga: Sindhu Bhairavi
4	"Onanila Punchiriyal"	Unni Menon	Raaga: Sindhu Bhairavi
5	"Chunathu Thenulla"	Unni Menon	
6	"Ranjini Raagam"	Unni Menon	Raaga: Raagamalika (Ranjani, Hamsadhwani)
7	"Rasikanaamen Kaamukan"	S. Janaki	
8	"Uthrattathi Naalu"	Unni Menon	Raaga: Mohanam
9	"Vande Vageeswari"	Unni Menon	Raaga: Kalyani
10	"Viraahaashru Kanagalumaay"	Unni Menon, S. Janaki	
