= Shaheed-e-Azad Bhagat Singh =

- Directed by: Jagdish Gautam
- Starring: Prem Adib; P. Jairaj; Smriti Biswas; Johnny Walker; Cuckoo; Amirbai Karnataki
- Music by: Lachhiram Tamar
- Production company: Poonum's Productions
- Release date: 1954
- Country: India
- Language: Hindi

Shaheed-e-Azad Bhagat Singh is a 1954 Indian Hindi-language biographical film directed by Jagdish Gautam based on the life and martyrdom of the Indian freedom fighter Bhagat Singh. Starring Prem Adib in the title role alongside P. Jairaj, Smriti Biswas, Johnny Walker and Amirbai Karnataki in lead roles. It is recognized as the first feature film made on the life of Bhagat Singh. The famous patriotic song "Sarfaroshi Ki Tamanna", sung by Mohammed Rafi, gained popularity after the film's release.

== Plot ==
The film revolves with the life of revolutionary leader Bhagat Singh, focusing on his involvement in the Indian independence movement against the British colonial rule and his ultimate execution by hanging alongwith his comrades Rajguru and Sukhdev on 23 March 1931.

== Cast ==
- Prem Adib as Bhagat Singh
- Johnny Walker
- P. Jairaj
- Smriti Biswas
- Cuckoo
- Amirbai Karnataki
- Ashita Mazumdar
