= Dilli Ka Thug =

- Poster
- Directed by: S. D. Narang
- Written by: H. A. Rahi
- Screenplay by: Z.Hussain
- Story by: Z.Hussain
- Produced by: S. D. Narang
- Starring: Kishore Kumar; Nutan
- Cinematography: G. Singh; F. C. Marconi (Colour)
- Edited by: Mohan Rathod
- Music by: Ravi
- Production companies: Famous Cine Lab & Studios Ltd.
- Distributed by: New Oriental Pictures
- Release date: 1958
- Running time: 132 minutes
- Country: India
- Language: Hindi

Dilli Ka Thug (The Gangster of Delhi) is a 1958 Hindi-language comedy film directed by S. D. Narang. It stars Kishore Kumar, Nutan, Madan Puri and Iftekhar. The music was by Ravi and the lyrics were by S.H. Bihari, Shailendra and Majrooh Sultanpuri.

== Plot ==
Kishore Kumar Sharma gambles and tricks people to make money. On being confronted by his mother, he decides to find a job and lands one in Mumbai, where he continues wooing Asha. Kishore's father and his friend were murdered by the notorious Anantram who now wears a mask to hide his true identity, continues manufacturing spurious medicines and also passes as Asha's uncle. The firm employing Kishore is run by Anantram and his two henchmen Sevakram and Bihari. Anantram goes to murder Kishore in the hospital, but drops his monocle, which makes inspector Dilip Singh suspicious. He manages to take Anantram's fingerprints on Sohan Lal's wallet and figures out the truth. What follows is a dramatic air-borne sequence where Anantram is beaten by Kishore and shot by Asha. Kishore manages to land the airplane after the pilots lose consciousness.

== Cast ==
- Kishore Kumar as Kishore Kumar Sharma
- Nutan as Asha
- Madan Puri as Bihari
- Iftekhar as Inspector Dilip Singh
- Krishnakant as Sewakram
- Pratima Devi as Mrs. Sharma
- Ratna Bhushan as Radha Sharma
- Smriti Biswas as Dancer Lily (In the song O Babu O Lala)
- Minoo Mumtaz as Dancer (In the song Kisi Ka Dil Lena Ho)
- Kumud Tripathi as Jaggu
- Ratan Gaurang as Kishore's punter
- Amar as Professor Amarnath
- Mirajkar as Subramaniam
- Brahm Bharadwaj as Prosecutor lawyer

== Production ==
Madhubala was the initial choice for the female lead role. She left the film due to health issues, and was replaced by Nutan.

== Soundtrack ==
The background score and soundtrack were composed by Ravi, while the lyrics were penned by Majrooh, Shailendra and S. H. Bihari. The song "Cat Mane Billi" was later adapted as the Tamil song "B.O.Y. Boy Inna Paiyan " for Thilakam (1960).

=== Track listing ===
Song	Singer	Raga
"Hum To Mohabbat Karega"	Kishore Kumar	
"C A T Cat, Cat Mane Billi, R A T Rat, Rat Mane Chooha"	Kishore Kumar, Asha Bhosle	
"Yeh Raaten, Yeh Mausam, Nadi Ka Kinara"	Kishore Kumar, Asha Bhosle	Kirwani
"O Bandariya"	Kishore Kumar	
"Seekh Le Babu Pyar Ka Jadu"	Asha Bhosle	
"Yeh Bahar, Yeh Sama"	Asha Bhosle	
"Kisi Ka Dil Lena Ho"	Asha Bhosle	
"O Babu, O Lala"	Geeta Dutt	
