= Do Ustad (1982 film) =

- Directed by: S. D. Narang
- Produced by: S. D. Narang
- Starring: Shatrughan Sinha; Reena Roy; Danny Denzongpa
- Music by: Bappi Lahiri
- Release date: 1982
- Country: India
- Language: Hindi

Do Ustad is a 1982 Bollywood action-film directed and produced by S. D. Narang. The film stars Shatrughan Sinha, Reena Roy, Danny Denzongpa in lead roles. The music of the film was composed by Bappi Lahiri.

== Cast ==
- Shatrughan Sinha as Suraj
- Reena Roy as Roopa
- Danny Denzongpa as Daku Badal Singh
- Jeevan as Dharamdas
- Vikram as Aslam
- Nirupa Roy as Aslam's Mother
- Shakti Kapoor as Shaka

== Soundtrack ==
Lyrics: Verma Malik

| Song | Singer |
|---|---|
| "Radhe Shyam Radhe Shyam" | Usha Uthup |
| "Kitne Hi Saalon Se Main Tere Khayalon Se Main" | Lata Mangeshkar, Bhupinder Singh |
| "Meri Choli Pe Chameli" | Asha Bhosle |
| "Us Raat Ki Subah" | Asha Bhosle |
| "Ae Dil Tu Kya Jane" | Asha Bhosle |
