= Parsi theatre =

Indian theatre tradition

Parsi theatre is a generic term for an influential theatre tradition, staged by Parsis, and theatre companies largely owned by the Parsi business community, which flourished between 1850 and the 1930s. Plays were primarily in Urdu, as well as Gujarati to an extent. After its beginning in Bombay, it soon developed into various traveling theatre companies, which toured across India, especially north and western India (now Gujarat and Maharashtra), popularizing proscenium-style theatre in regional languages.

Entertainment-driven and incorporating musical theatre and folk theatre, in the early 1900s, some Parsi theatre producers switched to new media like bioscope and subsequently many became film producers. The theatre diminished in popularity, with the arrival of the talkies era in Hindi cinema in the 1930s. Post-independence, it experienced a revival in the 1950s, much like theatre in the rest of India.

Raghubir Yadav singing Parsi Theatre Style, Laila-Majanu song

== History ==
The British community in Bombay had been staging theatre in English language for sometime by the mid-19th century. Parsis were a prominent business community in the city. In early 1850s, the students of Elphinstone College in Mumbai had formed a dramatic society and started performing Shakespeare. The first Parsi Theatre company called "Pārsī Nāṭak Maṇḍali" performed their first play Roostum Zabooli and Sohrab in 1853, followed by King Afrasiab and Rustom Pehlvan and Pādśāh Faredun. By 1860 over 20 Parsi theatre groups were formed in Mumbai.

Sharmistha Gooptu and Bhaumik identify Indo-Persian/Islamicate culture as a major influence on Parsi theatre. Up until the early 20th century, Urdu was the most widely used language in Parsi theater, due to the influence of Urdu poetry. The One Thousand and One Nights (Arabian Nights) also had a strong influence on Parsi theater, which performed "Persianate adventure-romances", which in turn were later adapted into early Bollywood films.

The early plays in Parsi theatre presented Indianized versions of Shakespeare’s plays, by turning them into folk performances, with dozens of songs added in. Soon Indian legends, epic and mythological tales made an appearance as source material. As Parsi theatre companies started travelling across North India, they employed native writers to churn out scripts in the Hindustani language, mixing Hindi and Urdu.

Later Parsi plays "blended realism and fantasy, music and dance, narrative and spectacle, earthy dialogue and ingenuity of stage presentation, integrating them into a dramatic discourse of melodrama". For mass appeal the plays incorporated humour, melodious songs and music, sensationalism and stagecraft. The success of Parsi theatre lead to the development of theatre in regional languages notably modern Gujarati theatre, Marathi theatre and Hindi theatre. Later it led to the development of Hindi cinema (Bollywood), the effect of Parsi theatre is still evident in the Masala film genre of Indian cinema, and especially in Bollywood film songs. According to screenwriter and lyricist Javed Akhtar, Urdu Parsi theatre's ghazal, thumri and kajri traditions were the basis for Bollywood's filmi-ghazal, thumri and kajri styles of music.

Parsi theatre was also popular in Southeast Asia, where it was known as wayang Parsi and often imitated.

In 1981, Mumbai-based theatre director Nadira Babbar, started her theatre group Ekjute (Together), with the production of Yahudi Ki Ladki, which revived the Parsi theatre style, and is considered one of its finest.

== Bibliography ==
- Hochman, Stanley (1984). McGraw-Hill Encyclopedia of World Drama: An International Reference Work in 5 Volumes. VNR AG. ISBN 978-0-07-079169-5.
- Nicholson, Rashna Darius (2015). "Corporeality, Aryanism, Race: The Theatre and Social Reform of the Parsis of Western India". South Asia: Journal of South Asian Studies. 38 (4): 613–638. doi:10.1080/00856401.2015.1080211. S2CID 146409840.
- Palsetia, Jesse S. (2001). The Parsis of India: Preservation of Identity in Bombay City. BRILL. ISBN 90-04-12114-5.
- Somanath Gupta; tr. Kathryn Hansen (2005). The Parsi Theatre: Its Origins and Development. Seagull Books. ISBN 978-81-7046-273-6.
- Sandria B. Freitag (1989). "Chapter 2: The Birth of Hindi Drama in Banaras: 1868–1885, by Kathryn Hansen". Culture and power in Banaras: community, performance, and environment, 1800–1980. University of California Press. ISBN 978-0-520-06367-9.
- Nicholson, Rashna Darius (2021). The Colonial public and the Parsi stage : the making of the theatre of empire (1853-1893). Springer. ISBN 978-3-030-65836-6. OCLC 1241450414.
- Marfatia, Meher (2011). Laughter in the House!: 20th-century Parsi Theatre. Sooni Taraporevala (photos). 49/50 Books. ISBN 978-81-921367-0-7.
- Kasbekar, Asha (2006). Pop Culture India!: Media, Arts, and Lifestyle. ABC-CLIO. ISBN 978-1-85109-636-7.
- Joughin, John J. (1997). Shakespeare and National Culture. Manchester University Press. ISBN 978-0-7190-5051-0.
- Blackburn, Stuart H.; Dalmia, Vasudha (2004). India's Literary History: Essays on the Nineteenth Century. Orient Blackswan. ISBN 978-81-7824-056-5.
- "History of the Parsi Theatre". Zoroastrian Educational Institute.
