= S. D. Narang =

Indian director, producer, and actor (1918–1986)

Satya Dev Narang
- Narang in Khazanchi (1941)
- Born: June 18, 1918; Lyallpur, Punjab, British India
- Died: January 25, 1986 (aged 67); Bombay, Maharashtra, India
- Education: King Edward Medical College (M.B.B.S.)
- Occupations: Film director; producer; actor; author
- Years active: 1941–1986
- Spouse: Smriti Biswas (m. 1960)
- Children: 2

Satya Dev Narang (18 June 1918 – 25 January 1986) was an Indian film director, producer, actor and author, who worked in Hindi, Punjabi, and Bengali cinema. He was active in the film industry from the 1940s to the 1980s.

Narang began his career as an actor in Khazanchi (1941) before establishing several film production companies in Lahore, Calcutta, and Bombay. His directorial credits include Yahudi Ki Ladki (1957), Dilli Ka Thug (1958), Bombay Ka Chor (1962), Shehnai (1964) and Anmol Moti (1969). Having obtained an M.B.B.S. degree at King Edward Medical College, he also authored books on psychology and bioeconomics.

== Early life ==
Satya Dev Narang was born on 18 June 1918 in Lyallpur, Punjab, British India. He studied biology at Government College University, Lahore, and obtained an M.B.B.S. at King Edward Medical College. During his studies, he also pursued research into binocular theory of vision and was reportedly awarded a Ph.D. for his work.

== Career ==
Narang made his acting debut with the Hindi musical Khazanchi (1941), which became the first Indian film to celebrate a golden jubilee theatrical run. Narang subsequently starred in several Hindi and Punjabi films, including co-starring with Ragni in Patwari and Ravi Paar (both 1942), which made him the era's "youngest successful hero in Lahore", according to Cinemaazi. Narang then transitioned into filmmaking, establishing Upper India Studios in Lahore, where he produced and directed Yeh Hai Zindagi (1947).

Following the Partition of India, Narang relocated to Calcutta, where he established Bengal National Studios and produced films such as Chattogram Astragar Lunthan (1949), a Bengali film based on the Chittagong Armoury Raid of 1930.

He moved to Bombay in 1952 and founded New Oriental Pictures. His notable directorial credits came in Arab Ka Saudagar (1956), Yahudi Ki Ladki (1957), Dilli Ka Thug (1958), Bombay Ka Chor (1962), Shehnai (1964), and Anmol Moti (1969). Narang's films are known for exploring unusual themes and concepts, such as depicting a Jewish woman as heroine in Yahudi Ki Ladki, ice skating in Bombay Ka Chor, the Indian Air Force in Shehnai, and underwater adventure in Anmol Moti. The lattermost, starring Jeetendra and Babita, is referred to as India's first underwater movie.

Narang's later credits include Do Thug (1975), College Girl (1978), Do Ustad (1982), and Kismetwala (1986).

Besides filmmaking, Narang pursued interests in writing and scientific research. He authored works including Human Psychology, the novel Hippy Aur Yogi, and An Introduction to the Theory of Bio-Economics, in which he explored the relationship between biological factors and economic development. His work in this field was recognised by the Bombay Biological Association.

== Personal life and death ==
Narang was a Hindu. In 1960, he married his long-term partner Smriti Biswas, a Christian actress of Bengali descent. The couple had two sons.

Narang died of a cardiac arrest in 1986, at the age of 67.

== Reception and legacy ==
Actor-singer Kishore Kumar headlined two of Narang's films—Dilli Ka Thug (1958) and Bombay Ka Chor (1962)—during the formative years of his acting career. According to Kishore Kumar: The Ultimate Biography (2022), Narang influenced several of Kumar's distinctive screen mannerisms, including his habit of speaking with his hands covering his mouth, pointing a finger upwards, and incorporating intermittent coughing and exaggerated breathing sounds into his dialogue.

Narang is also credited with encouraging Kumar's improvisational acting and his performances in multiple roles. However, Kumar himself was not particularly impressed by Narang's filmmaking style; in 1985, he said:

Directors like S. D. Narang didn't even know where to place the camera. He would take long pensive drags from his cigarettes, mumble 'QUIET QUIET QUIET' to everyone, walk a couple of furlongs absent-minded, mutter to himself and then tell the cameraman to place the camera wherever he wanted. His standard line to me was: Do something.
What something?
Come on. Something!
So I would go off on my antics.
Is this the way to act? Is this the way to direct a movie? And yet Narangsaab made so many hits!

== List of works ==
=== Acting credits ===
Year	Title	Role	Co-star	Language	Ref.
1941	Khazanchi	Kanwal	Ramola Devi	Hindi	
1942	Zamindar	Karan		Hindi	
1942	Patwari		Ragni	Punjabi	
1942	Ravi Paar		Ragni	Punjabi	
1943	Sahara		Renuka Devi	Hindi	
1946	Durban			Hindi	

=== Directorial credits ===
Year	Title	Banner	Notes	Ref.
1947	Yeh Hai Zindagi	Upper India Studios		
1948	Ek Aurat	Bengal National Studios		
1950	Nai Bhabhi	Bengal National Studios		
1956	Arab Ka Saudagar	New Oriental Pictures		
1957	Yahudi Ki Ladki	New Oriental Pictures		
1958	Dilli Ka Thug	New Oriental Pictures		
1962	Bombay Ka Chor	New Oriental Pictures		
1964	Shehnai	Narang Films		
1966	Sagaai	Narang Films		
1969	Anmol Moti	Narang Films		
1972	Babul Ki Galiyaan	Narang Films		
1975	Do Thug	Narang Films		
1978	College Girl	Narang Films		
1982	Do Ustad	Narang Films		
1986	Kismetwala	Narang Films		

=== Production credits ===
- Yeh Hai Zindagi (1947)
- Ek Aurat (1948)
- Chattogram Astragar Lunthan (1949) – Bengali film directed by Nirmal Chowdhury
- Lottery (1949) – Bengali film directed by G. Singh
- Nai Bhabhi (1950)
- Arab Ka Saudagar (1956)
- Yahudi Ki Ladki (1957)
- Dilli Ka Thug (1958)
- Modern Girl (1961) – Hindi film directed by R. Bhattacharya
- Bombay Ka Chor (1962)
- Shehnai (1964)
- Sagaai (1966)
- Anmol Moti (1969)
- Babul Ki Galiyaan (1972)
- Do Thug (1975)
- College Girl (1978)
- Ram Kasam (1978) – Hindi film directed by Chand
- Do Ustad (1982)
- Kismetwala (1986)

=== Bibliography ===
- Human Psychology
- Hippy Aur Yogi
- An Introduction to the Theory of Bio-Economics
