= Kishore Kumar =

Indian singer and actor (1929–1987)

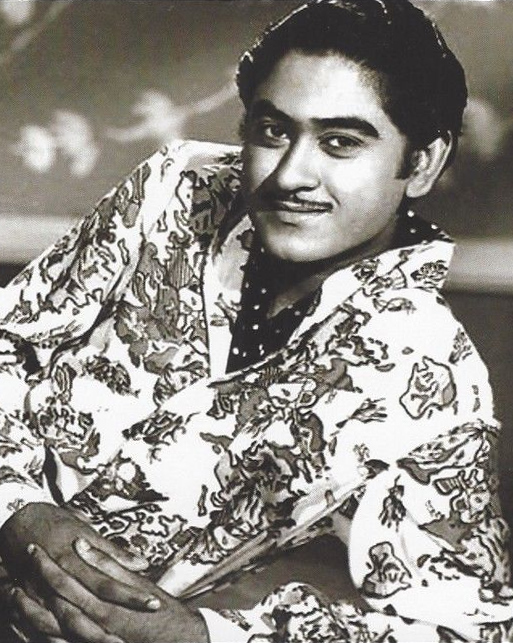
- Born: Abhas Kumar Ganguly; 4 August 1929; Khandwa, British India
- Died: 13 October 1987 (aged 58); Bombay, India
- Other name: Kishore Da
- Occupations: Playback singer; actor; music director; lyricist; film producer; film director; screenwriter; composer
- Years active: 1946–1987
- Works: Films; songs
- Spouses: Ruma Ghosh (m. 1951; div. 1958) Madhubala (m. 1960; died 1969) Yogeeta Bali (m. 1976; div. 1978) Leena Chandavarkar (m. 1980)
- Children: 2, including Amit
- Relatives: See Ganguly family See Mukherjee-Samarth family
- Awards: Full list
- Musical career
- Genres: Filmi; Disco; Pop; Yodelling; Rock and Roll; Semi-Classical; Comedy Music; Rabindra Sangeet
- Instruments: Vocals, piano

Kishore Kumar (born Abhas Kumar Ganguly;; 4 August 1929 – 13 October 1987) was an Indian playback singer, musician and actor. He is widely regarded as one of the greatest, most influential and dynamic singers in the history of Indian music. Kumar was one of the most popular singers in the Indian subcontinent, notable for his yodelling and ability to sing songs in different voices. He used to sing in different genres but some of his rare compositions, considered classics, were lost in time. In 2013, Kumar was voted "The Most Popular Male Playback Singer" in a poll conducted by the Filmfare magazine.

Besides Hindi, he sang in many other Indian languages, including Bengali, Marathi, Assamese, Gujarati, Kannada, Bhojpuri, Malayalam, Odia and Urdu. He also released a few non-film albums in multiple languages, especially in Bengali, which are noted as all-time classics. According to his brother and legendary actor Ashok Kumar, Kishore Kumar was successful as a singer because his "voice hits the mike, straight, at its most sensitive point".

He won 8 Filmfare Award for Best Male Playback Singer out of 28 nominations and holds the record for winning and nominating the most Filmfare Awards in that category. He was awarded the Lata Mangeshkar Award by the Madhya Pradesh government in 1985. In 1997, the Madhya Pradesh Government initiated an award called the "Kishore Kumar Award" for contributions to Hindi cinema. In 2012, his unreleased last song sold for ₹15.6 lakh ($17,500 US) at the Osian's Cinefan Auction in New Delhi.

== Early life ==
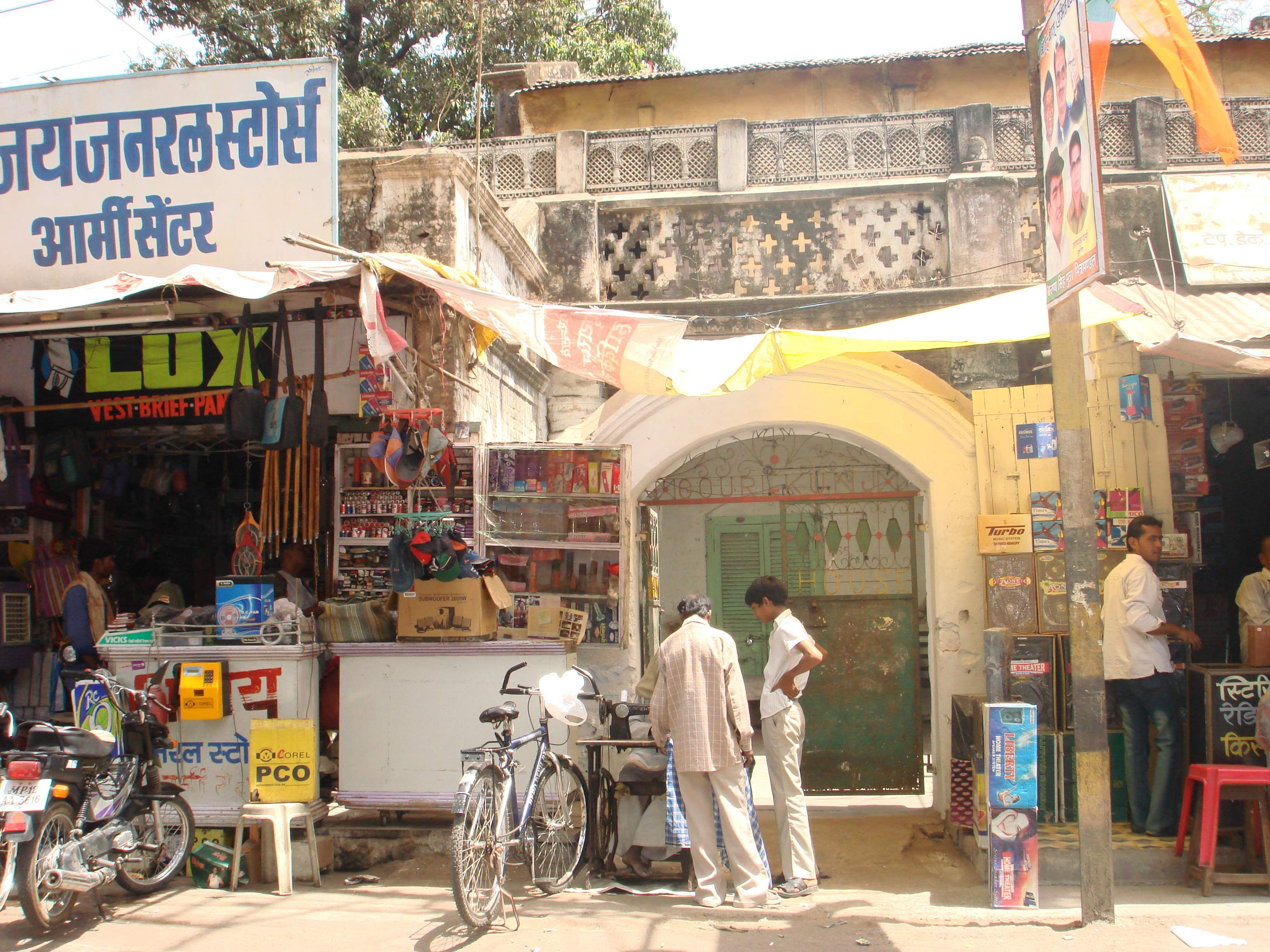
Ganguly House (Gauri Kunj), Kishore's ancestral home

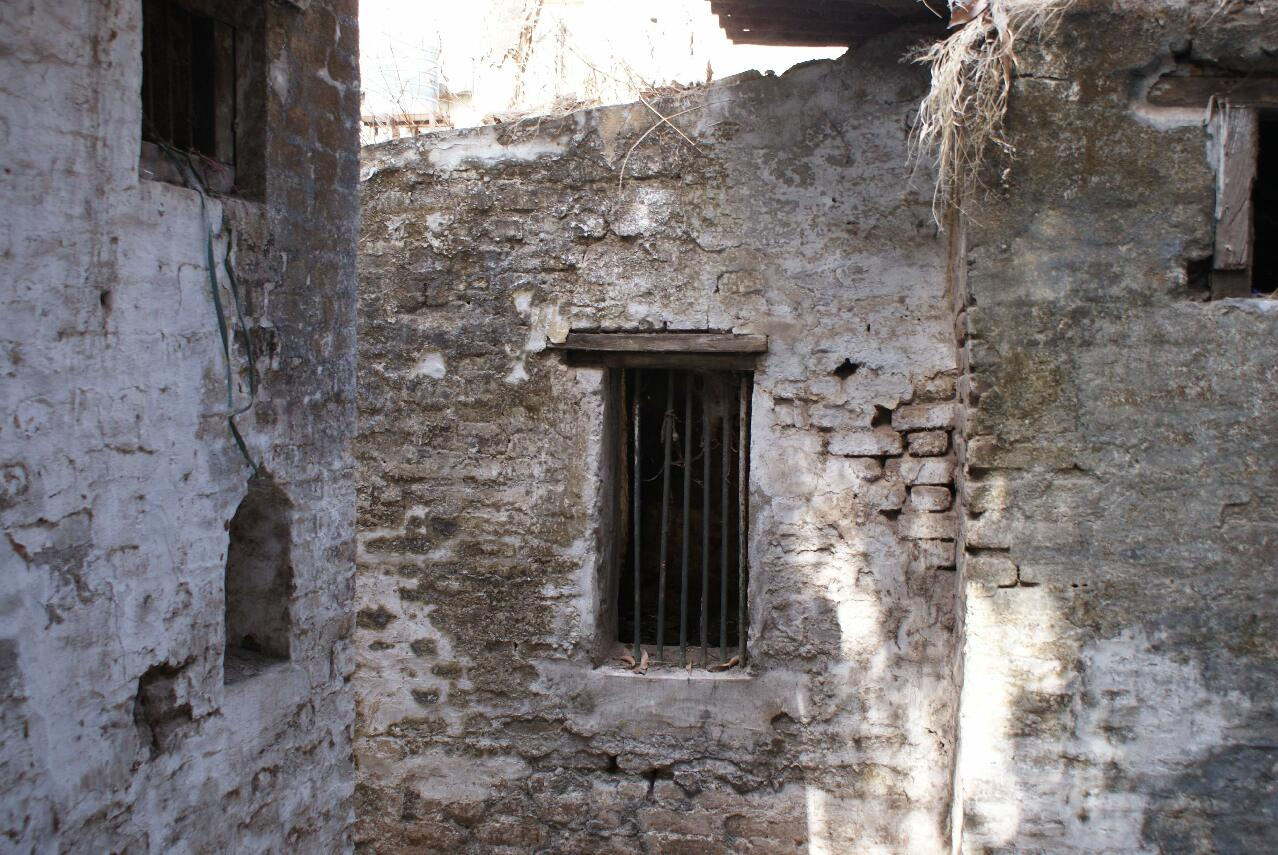
Kishore Kumar's ancestral home

Kishore Kumar was born in a Bengali Brahmin Ganguly family in Khandwa, Central Provinces (now in Madhya Pradesh) as Abhas Kumar Ganguly. His father, Kunjalal Ganguly (Gangopadhyay), was a lawyer and his mother, Gouri Devi came from a wealthy Bengali family and was a home-maker. Kunjalal was invited by the Kamavisadar Gokhale family of Khandwa to be their personal lawyer. Kumar was the youngest of four siblings, the elder three being Ashok (the eldest), Sati Devi, and Anoop.

While Kumar was still a child, his brother Ashok became an actor in Hindi cinema. Later, Anoop also ventured into cinema with Ashok's help. Kumar graduated from Christian College, Indore.

== Career ==
=== Early career and influences ===
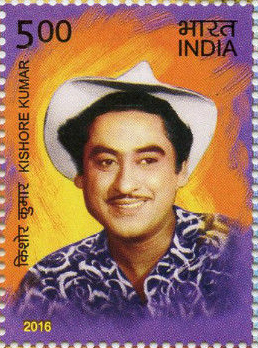
2016 postal stamp of India in remembrance to Kishore Kumar

After Ashok Kumar became a star of Hindi films, the Ganguly family visited Bombay (now Mumbai) regularly. Abhas Kumar changed his name to 'Kishore Kumar' and started his cinema career as a chorus singer at Bombay Talkies, where his brother worked. Music director Khemchand Prakash gave Kumar a chance to sing "Marne Ki Duayen Kyon Mangu" for the film Ziddi (1948). After this, Kumar was offered many other assignments, but he was not very serious about a film career. In 1949, he settled in Bombay.

During the initial stage of his career, Kumar was deeply inspired by singer K. L. Saigal and imitated his style of singing in some of his early films but later evolved his own, unique style. He had a great respect for poet and musician Rabindranath Tagore who influenced him in many ways. He was an ardent admirer of Hollywood actor-singer Danny Kaye. He hung the portraits of all these three personalities at his Gouri Kunj residence and would bow respectfully before them every day as a rule.

In his later career, Kumar was also heavily influenced by playback singer Ahmed Rushdi and his liking towards Rushdi was to the extent that former paid a tribute at Royal Albert Hall in London to the latter by singing some of his songs.

Kumar employed yodelling in many of his songs including, "Yeh Dil Na Hota Bechara", "Zindagi Ek Safar Hai Suhana", and "Chala Jata Hoon". The style eventually became an essential feature of his singing and was inspired by Jimmie Rodgers and Tex Morton.

In the movie Half Ticket, for one of the songs, "Aake Seedhi Lagi Dil Pe", the music director Salil Chowdhury had a duet in mind and wanted Kumar and Lata Mangeshkar to sing the song. However, since Lata Mangeshkar was not in town and Salil Chowdhury had to record that song before she could return, Kumar solved the problem by singing both the male and female parts of the song himself. The duet is actually for Pran and Kumar on the screen dressed as a woman. It just turned out to be fine as he did admirably well singing both in male and female voices.

Music director S. D. Burman is credited with spotting Kumar's talent for singing. During the making of Mashaal (1950), Burman visited Ashok's house, where he heard Kumar imitating K. L. Saigal. He complimented him and told him that he should develop a style of his own, instead of copying Saigal. Kumar eventually developed his own style of singing, which featured yodelling, which he had heard on the records of Tex Morton and Jimmie Rodgers.S. D. Burman kept making Kishore sing for Dev Anand from the 50s to the early 70s. S. D. Burman provided him the training and encouraged Kumar a lot, especially in the late 50s and early 60s, resulting in Kumar developing into a great singer in the future years.

S. D. Burman recorded Kumar's voice for Dev Anand's Munimji (1954), Taxi Driver (1954), House No. 44 (1955), Funtoosh (1956), Nau Do Gyarah (1957), Paying Guest (1957), Guide (1965), Jewel Thief (1967), Prem Pujari (1970), and Tere Mere Sapne (1971). He also composed music for Kumar's home production Chalti Ka Naam Gaadi (1958). Some of their songs were "Maana Janaab Ne Pukara Nahin" from Paying Guest (1957), "Hum Hain Rahi Pyar Ke" from Nau Do Gyarah (1957), "Ai Meri Topi Palat Ke Aa" from Funtoosh (1956), and "Ek Ladki Bheegi Bhaagi Si" from Chalti Ka Naam Gaadi. Asha Bhosle and Kishore performed duets composed by Burman including "Chhod Do Aanchal" from Paying Guest (1957), "Ankhon Mein Kya Ji" from Nau Do Gyarah (1957), "Haal Kaisa Hai Janaab Ka" and "Paanch Rupaiya Baara Aana" from Chalti Ka Naam Gaadi (1958) and "Arre Yaar Meri Tum Bhi Ho Gajab" from Teen Deviyan (1965).

As a singer, Kumar's work with many music directors in this period includes "Ye Raatein Ye Mausam" and "Hum Toh Mohabbat Karega" from Dilli Ka Thug, "Piya Piya Mora Jiya" from Baap Re Baap, "Hello Hello Ji" from Bombay Ka Chor, "Michael Hai To Cycle Hai" from Bewaqoof, "Ae Haseeno Nazneeno" from Chacha Zindabad, "Zaroorat Hai Zaroorat Hai" from Man-Mauji (1961), "Likha Hai Teri Ankhon Mein" from Teen Devian, "Suno Jaana Suno Jaana", "Pyaar Baatke Chalo" and "Kya Teri Zulfein Hai" from Hum Sab Ustad Hain, "Khoobsurat Haseena" from Mr. X in Bombay, "Gaata Rahe Mera Dil" from Guide (1965), "Sultana Sultana" from Shreeman Funtoosh, "Machalti Hui" from Ganga Ki Lahren, "Mera Dil Meri Jaan" and "Pyar Ka Jaahan Hotel" from Jaal Saz and "Yeh Dil Na Hota Bechara" from Jewel Thief (1967).

Music director C. Ramchandra also recognised Kumar's talent as a singer. They collaborated on songs including "Eena Meena Deeka" from Aasha (1957). Kumar's work includes "Nakhrewaali" from New Delhi (1956) by Shankar Jaikishan, "C.A.T. Cat Maane Billi" and "Hum To Mohabbat Karega" from Dilli Ka Thug (1958) by Ravi, and "Chhedo Na Meri Zulfein" from Ganga Ki Lahren (1964) by Chitragupta.

In 1968, Rahul Dev Burman worked with Kumar on the soundtrack of the film Padosan (1968), in which Kumar sang "Mere Saamne Wali Khidki Mein" and "Kehna Hai". Padosan was a comedy featuring Kishore as a dramatist-musician, Mehmood as a Carnatic music and dance teacher, and Sunil Dutt as a simpleton named Bhola. Kishore's character was inspired by his uncle, Dhananjay Bannerjee, a classical singer. The highlight of the film was a musical, comical duel between Kumar, Sunil Dutt and Mehmood: Ek Chatur Nar Karke Singaar (duet with Manna Dey).

Hemant Kumar also recorded many hit songs with Kishore in the Hindi film industry and in the Bengali film industry. They first collaborated in the 1957 film Bandi which had songs like Ek Roz Hamari Bhi Daal Galegi, Ghar Ki Raunaq Hai Gharwali, and Chup Ho Ja. After that, Kishore Kumar produced a Bengali film called Lukochuri, and hired Hemant Kumar to be the music director of the film. The songs were superhit in Bengal and those songs were "Shing Nei Tobu Naam Tar Singha", Ek Paloker Ektu Dekha, Ei To Hethay Kunjochhayay (duet with Ruma Guha Thakurta), Sudhu Ektukani Chawa (Duet with Geeta Dutt) and Mayabono Biharini Horini (Duet with Ruma Guha Thakurta) which was Kishore Kumar's first Rabindra Sangeet. Hemant Kumar recorded songs with Kishore in films like Miss Mary (1957), Girl Friend (1960), Do Dooni Chaar (1968), and Rahgir (1969). Kishore Kumar's most hit song which was composed by Hemant Kumar was Woh Shaam Kuchh Ajeeb Thi from Khamoshi. In Bengali films, Kishore Kumar sang songs which were composed by Hemant Kumar in films like Madhya Rater Tara (1961), Ektuku Chhoan Lage (1965) which has songs like Ektuku Chhoan Lage, Saraswatir Seba Kori and Dustoro Parabar Periye (duet with Hemant Kumar), and Dustu Prajapati (1967). Kishore Kumar got his first BFJA Award for Best Male Playback singer for Ektuku Chhoan Lage in the year 1966.

In 1969, Shakti Samanta produced and directed Aradhana. Kumar sang three songs in the film; "Mere Sapnon Ki Rani", "Kora Kagaj Tha Ye Man Mera" and "Roop Tera Mastana". Shakti Samanta suggested that Kumar sing the other songs too. When the film was released, Kumar's three songs established him as a leading playback singer of Hindi cinema. Kumar won his first Filmfare award for "Roop Tera Mastana".

=== Acting career ===
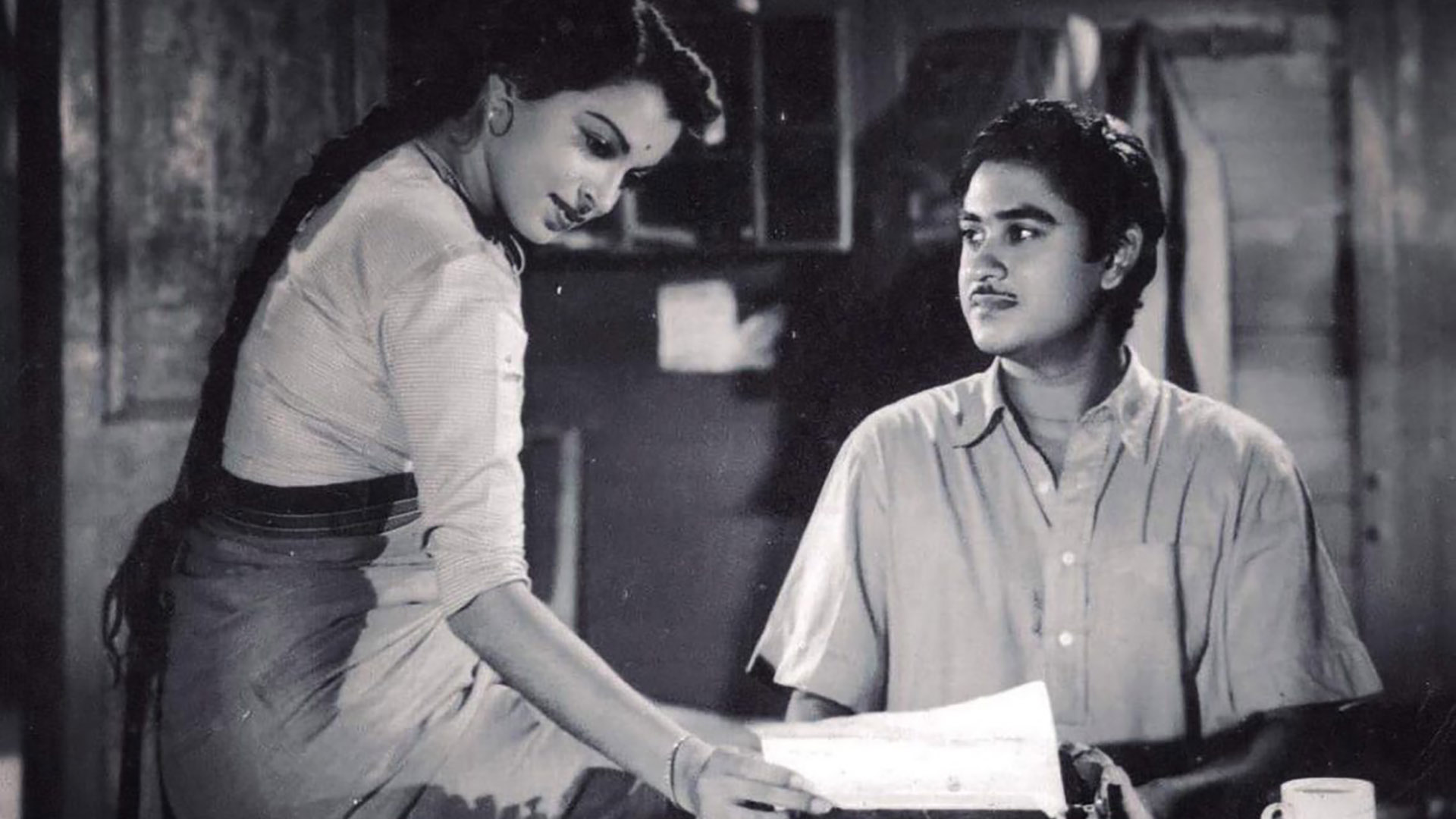
Kumar in a scene from 1954 film Naukri with Sheila Ramani (left)

Kumar's first film appearance was in Shikari (1946), in which his brother, Ashok played the lead role. Kumar played the lead in the Bombay Talkies film Andolan (1951), directed by Phani Majumdar. Although he got some acting assignments with the help of his brother, he was more interested in becoming a singer. But Ashok wanted Kumar to be an actor like him. Between 1946 and 1955, Kumar appeared in 22 films, of which 16 were flops; since he was uninterested in taking up acting as a career, he found ways to be in the bad books of the director or producer, so that they would throw him from their films. It was only after the success of films such as Ladki, Naukari, Miss Mala, Char Paise and Baap Re Baap that Kumar developed an interest in acting seriously, which resulted in him having successful films as the lead actor between 1955 and 1966.

Kumar starred in Bimal Roy's Naukari (1954) and Hrishikesh Mukherjee's directorial debut Musafir (1957). Salil Chowdhury, the music director for Naukari, was initially dismissive of Kumar as a singer when he found that Kumar had no formal training in music. However, after hearing his voice, Chowdhury gave him the song Chhota Sa Ghar Hoga, which was supposed to be sung by Hemant Kumar. The commercially successful films of Kumar included Ladki (1953), Naukari (1954), Baap Re Baap (1955), Paisa Hi Paisa (1956), New Delhi (1956), Naya Andaz (1956), Bhagam Bhag (1956), Bhai Bhai (1956), Aasha (1957), Chalti Ka Naam Gaadi (1958), Dilli Ka Thug (1958), Jaal Saz (1959), Bombay Ka Chor (1962), Chacha Zindabad (1959), Man-Mauji (1962), Jhumroo (1961), Half Ticket (1962), Mr. X in Bombay (1964), Shreeman Funtoosh (1965), Ek Raaz (1963), Ganga Ki Lahren (1964), Hum Sab Ustaad Hai (1965), Haal E Dil, Pyar Kiye Jaa (1966), and Padosan (1968). As an actor, his best period was between 1954 and 1966. His onscreen pairing with actresses Mala Sinha, Vyjayanthimala, Nutan, Madhubala, Meena Kumari and Kumkum gave the biggest hits in his career.

Chalti Ka Naam Gaadi (1958), his home production, had the three Ganguly brothers and Madhubala in main roles. Kumar played a car mechanic who has a romance with a city girl; (Madhubala) with a subplot involving the brothers. Kumar acted in and composed the music for Jhumroo (1961), and wrote the lyrics for the film's title song, "Main Hoon Jhumroo". Later, he produced and directed Door Gagan Ki Chhaon Mein (1964), where he starred with Bengali actress Supriya Devi. He also wrote the script and composed music for the film, which is about the relationship between a father (Kumar) and his deaf and mute son (played by his real-life son Amit Kumar).

After 1966, as an actor, Kumar built up a notoriety for coming late for the shootings or bunking them altogether. His films flopped frequently after 1965 and he landed in income tax trouble. Kumar produced and directed some movies in the late 1970s and early 1980s; Pyar Zindagi Hai, Badhti Ka Naam Dadhi (1978), Shabhash Daddy, Door Waadiyon Mein Kahin (1980) and Chalti Ka Naam Zindagi (1982), which was his last appearance as an actor.

=== 1970s-1980s: Established singer ===
Kumar was a leading singer throughout 1970s and 1980s until his death in 1987. Kumar sang the most songs in his career for Rajesh Khanna. Kumar sang 245 songs picturised on Rajesh Khanna across 92 films, which is an unbeaten record for singer-actor combination. Kishore sang 245 songs for Rajesh Khanna, 202 for Jeetendra, 131 for Amitabh Bachchan and 119 for Dev Anand. S. D. Burman and Kishore continued with music including "Ye Dil Na Hota Bechara" and "Aasmaan Ke Neeche" from Jewel Thief (1967), "Phoolon Ke Rang Se" and "Shokhiyon Mein Ghola Jaaye" from Prem Pujari (1969), "Aaj Madhosh Hua Jaye Re," "Khilte Hain Gul Yahan" and "O Meri Sharmilee" from Sharmilee (1971), "Meet Na Mila" from Abhimaan (1973), and "Jeevan Ki Bagiya Mehkegi" from Tere Mere Sapne (1971). In 1975, S. D. Burman composed his last song for Kishore, "Badi Sooni Sooni Hai", for the film Mili.

R. D. Burman recorded several songs with Kumar in the 1970s, including "O Maajhi Re" from Khushboo, "Yeh Shaam Mastaani" and "Yeh Jo Mohabbat Hai" from Kati Patang (1971), "Raat Kali Ek Khwab Mein Aayi" from Buddha Mil Gaya (1971) and "Chingari Koi Bhadke", "Kuch To Log Kahenge (Amar Prem)", "Zindagi Ke Safar Me Guzar Jaate Hain Jo Makam" from Aap Ki Kasam (1974), "Aane Wala Pal" from Golmaal (1979), "Hume Aur Jeene Ki Chahat Na Hoti" from Agar Tume Na Hote (1983), "Raha Pe Rahete Hai" from Namkeen (1985) and "Jab Bhi Koi Kangana" from Shaukeen (1987). Although Kumar was not formally trained in classical music, R. D. Burman often had Kumar sing semi-classical songs, such as "Humein Tum Se Pyaar Kitna" from Kudrat and "Mere Naina Saawan Bhadon" from Mehbooba.

R. D. Burman recorded several duets pairing Kishore with Asha Bhosle and Lata Mangeshkar, including "Panna Ki Tamanna" and "Bahut Door Mujhe" from Heera Panna (1973), "Neend Chura Ke Raaton Mein" from the film Shareef Budmaash (1973), "Mujhko Mohabbat Mein Dhoka" and "Kisise Dosti Karlo" from Dil Deewana (1974), "Dhal Gayi Rang" from Heeralal Pannalal (1978), "Ek Main Hoon" from Darling Darling (1977), "Rimjhim Gire Sawan" from Manzil (1979), "Kya Yehi Pyar Hai" and "Hum Tum Se Mile" from Rocky (1981), "Jaan-e-Jaan Dhoondta" from Jawani Diwani, "Kahin Na Jaa" and "Kaho Kaise Rasta" from Bade Dilwala (1983), "Sun Zara Shok Haseena" and "Kharishoo" from Harjaee (1981), "Waada Haanji Waada" from The Burning Train (1980) and "Kaisi Lagrahi Hoon Mein" from Jhuta Sach (1984).

Apart from the Burmans, Kumar worked with other famous music directors too. The composer duo Laxmikant–Pyarelal composed many songs sung by him, including "Mere Mehboob Qayamat Hogi" from Mr. X in Bombay, "Mere Naseeb Mein Aye Dost" from Do Raaste, "Yeh Jeevan Hai" from Piya Ka Ghar, "Mere Dil Mein Aaj Kya Hai" from Daag, "Nahi Mai Nahi Dekh Sakta" from Majboor, "Mere Diwanepan Ki Bhi" from Mehboob Ki Mehndi, "Naach Meri Bulbul" from Roti, "Chal Chal Chal Mere Haathi" from Haathi Mere Saathi and "Tu Kitne Baras Ki" from Karz. Laxmikant–Pyarelal also worked with Kishore and Mohammed Rafi on duets for the films Zakhmee, Dostana, Ram Balram and Deedaar-E-Yaar. Laxmikant–Pyarelal composed "I Love You (Kaate Nahin Katate Yeh Din Yeh Raat)" for Mr. India (1987), a duet with Kishore and Alisha Chinoy.

Salil Chowdhury recorded songs such as "Koi Hota Jisko Apna" from Mere Apne and "Guzar Jaaye Din Din" from Annadata. Ravindra Jain recorded "Ghungroo Ki Tarah" and the duets "Le Jaayenge Le Jaayenge" from Chor Machaye Shor and "Tota Maina Ki Kahani" from Fakira. Shyamal Mitra recorded a duet of Kishore with Asha, "Sara Pyaar Tumhara" for the film Anandshram and the solo performances "Dil Aisa Kisi Ne Mera Toda" and "Na Poochho Koi Humein" for the film Amanush.

Khayyam recorded many of Kishore's duets with Lata Mangeshkar, including "Hazaar Raahein" and "Ankhon Mein Humne" from Thodisi Bewafaii and "Chandni Raat Mein" from Dil-E-Nadaan (1982). Hridaynath Mangeshkar recorded "Zindagi Aa Raha Hoon Main" from Mashaal (1984).

Kalyanji-Anandji recorded several songs with Kishore including "Zindagi Ka Safar" and "Jeevan Se Bhari", from Safar (1970), "O Saathi Re" from Muqaddar Ka Sikandar (1978), "Pal Pal Dil Ke Paas" from Blackmail (1973), "Neele Neele Ambar Par" from Kalaakaar (1983) and the chart buster qawwali "Qurbani Qurbani" from Qurbani (1980).

Kishore also worked with other composers including Hemant Kumar, Rajesh Roshan, Sapan Chakraborty and Bappi Lahiri. Kumar sang "Bhool Gaya Sab Kuchh" (duet with Lata Mangeshkar) and "Dil Kya Kare Jab Kisise" for Rajesh Roshan's film Julie. Their other songs include "Yaadon Mein Woh" from Swami, "Chhookar Mere Man Ko Kiya Toone Kya Ishaara" from Yaarana, "Kaha Tak Ye Manko Andher Chalenge" from Baton Baton Mein, "O Yara Tu Yaro Se Hai Pyar", and "Laharon Ki Tatah Yaadien" (1983) and Kahiye, Suniye (duet with Asha Bhosle) from Baton Baton Mein. Bappi Lahiri also recorded many songs with Kumar, including "Pag Ghunghroo Bandh" from Namak Halaal (1982), "Manzilen Apni Jagah Hai" from Sharaabi (1984), "Chalate Chalte Mere Ye Geet Yad Rakhana" from Chalte Chalte (1975) and "Saason Se Nahi Kadmose Nahi" from Mohabbat (1987), and duets with Lata Mangeshkar such as "Albela Mausam" and "Pyar Ka Tohfa" from Tohfa (1984). The Kishore and Bappi pair also recorded hits in Bengali, including "Chirodini Tumi Je Amar" from Amar Sangi (1987) and "E Amar Gurudakshina" from Gurudakshina (1987). Another Bengali musician was Ajay Das, who composed many hit songs in Kumar's voice. He also recorded a duet song Hello Hello Kya Haal Hai with Asha Bhosle for Naushad in 1975 for the movie Sunehra Sansar, the only song of Kishore. He also worked with music directors Basu and Manohari Singh for duets such as "Wada Karo Jaanam" and "Dariya Kinare" for the film Sabse Bada Rupaiya and "Aa Humsafar" for the film Chatpatee.

==== Indian Emergency ====
During the Indian Emergency (1975–1977), Sanjay Gandhi asked Kishore to sing for an Indian National Congress rally in Bombay, but he refused. As a result, Information and Broadcasting minister Vidya Charan Shukla (1975–1977) put an unofficial ban on playing Kumar songs on state broadcasters All India Radio and Doordarshan from 4 May 1976 till the end of Emergency.

=== Later years ===
Kishore Kumar's son Amit Kumar became a singer in Hindi cinema in 1974 with the song "Apne Bas Ki Baat Nahi", composed by Kumar for the film Badthi Ka Naam Daadi. Amit Kumar became popular with success of the song "Bade Achche Lagte Hai". Kishore continued singing for several actors even in 1980s. Kumar performed stage shows right from 1969 to earn money to pay his income tax arrears. Kumar stopped singing for Amitabh Bachchan in the year 1981, after Bachchan refused to appear as a guest in the film Mamta Ki Chhaon Mein, which Kishore produced. Kishore declined to perform as a playback singer for Amitabh in Naseeb, Coolie, Mard. Kishore said he would give his voice to Randhir Kapoor in the film Pukar, also starring Amitabh. Since Kishore shared good rapport with R. D. Burman, he agreed to sing in Mahaan, Shakti and Bemisal. He also agreed to Amitabh for the superhit films Sharabi and Geraftaar, at the request of Bappi Lahiri. Later, Kishore called a truce by singing for Amitabh in a solo song in Shahenshah and later in Toofan. Kishore sang the song "Mera Geet Adhura Hai" for his production Mamta Ki Chaon Mein and picturised the song on Rajesh Khanna. Kishore had directed the film, but died in 1987 and Rajesh Khanna helped Amit Kumar in releasing the film in 1989. He also temporarily stopped singing for Mithun Chakraborty after Yogeeta Bali divorced him and married Chakraborty. However, he later sang for Chakraborty in Surakshaa (1979), and in the 1980s in many films, including Boxer, Jaagir, Faraib and Waqt Ki Awaz.

In the mid-1980s, Kishore sang for Anil Kapoor in his first Hindi film as a leading man, Woh Saat Din. He also recorded for Mashaal (1984), Saaheb (1985), Karma (1986), Janbaaz (1986) and Mr. India (1987) for which he recorded the song "Zindagi Ki Yahi Reet Hai Haar Ke Baad Hi Jeet Hai". He sang duets with Alka Yagnik such as "Tumse Badhkar Duniya Mein Na Dekha" for Kaamchor in 1982, "Humnashi Aaake from Ek Daku Saher Mein" and sang "Teri Meri Prem Kahani" in Pighalta Aasman. He also recorded for newcomers like Aditya Pancholi for the song "Mere Dil Mein Utar Jana" for the film Laal Paree (1991).

Kishore Kumar was highly popular in 80s, winning five Filmfare Award for Best Male Playback Singer for the films Thodisi Bewafaii (1980), Namak Halaal (1982), Agar Tum Na Hote (1983), Sharaabi (1984), Saagar (1985). Kishore Kumar was the single nominee in 1985, having all the four nominations to his credit. Incidentally, Kishore Kumar's all nominated songs were from a single movie, Sharaabi.

He had recorded the duets "Kaho Kahan Chale" for the film Bulundi, "Pyar Ka Dard Hai" from Dard and "Tum Jo Chale Gaye" from Aas Paas, a few days before his heart attack in 1981. He suffered his first heart attack on 24 January 1981 in Kolkata in the noon hours and within a gap of another four hours, suffered his second heart attack. The first solo song sung by him, after recovery from his two attacks was "Mere Sang Sang Aya" from Rajput (1982) and the duet with Asha, "Mausam Bheega Bheega" from Gehra Zakham.

Kishore debut singing in Marathi films in 1987 with the song "Ashwini Ye Na" from the movie Gammat Jammat. This song became extremely popular and is considered one of the best songs in Marathi cinema. Kishore also sang another Marathi song, "Tujhi Majhi Jodi Jamali". Throughout his career, Kishore sang only two songs in Marathi.

== Collaborations with other singers ==
Kishore Kumar is credited with the highest number of multi-singer and male duet hits with the finest singers of different eras. Kishore Kumar sang the highest number of duets with Asha Bhosle (687 duets). He also sang duets with Lata Mangeshkar, Mohammed Rafi, Mukesh, Manna Dey, Mahendra Kapoor, Geeta Dutt, Shamshad Begum, Suman Kalyanpur, Anuradha Paudwal, Sulakshana Pandit, S. Janaki, P. Susheela, Alka Yagnik, and Kavita Krishnamurthy.

In the song "Humko Tumse Ho Gaya Hai Pyar" from Amar Akbar Anthony, Kishore sang one song with Lata Mangeshkar, Mohammed Rafi and Mukesh, the most legendary singers in Hindi films. This was probably the only time that all of them rendered their voices for one song. Kishore sang over 30 songs with his contemporary Rafi and they were good friends despite the claims of animosity reported in the media.

=== Bhajans ===
Kishore Kumar sang Bhajans like "Aao Kanhai Mere Dham" from Mere Jeevan Saathi (1972), "Devi Mata Rani" from Swarag Se Sunder (1986), "Jai Bholenath Jai Ho Prabhu" from Kunwara Baap (1974), "He Re Kanhaiya" from Chhoti Bahu (1971), "Jab Ram Naam Le Le" from Abhi Toh Jee Le (1977), "Kahe Apno K Kaam Nahi Aye Tu" from Raampur Ka Lakshman (1972), "Krishna Krishna, Bolo Krishna" from Naya Din Nai Raat (1974), "Prabhuji Teri Leela Aparampaar" from Humsafar (1953) etc.

=== Qawwali ===
Kishore Kumar recorded Qawwalis like all-time hit "Vaada Tera Vaada" from Dushman (1971), "Hum Toh Jhuk Kar Salam Karte Hai" from Fakira (1976), "Mehfil Mein Paimana Jo Laga Jhumne" from Chunaoti (1980), "Is Ishq Mein" from Mr. Romeo (1974), "Kya Cheez Hai Aurat Duniya Mein" from Zorro (1975), "Haal Kya Hai Dilon Ka" from Anokhi Ada (1973), a semi-qawwali "Jab Se Sarkar Ne Nashabandi Tod Di" from 5 Rifles (1974), the chart buster qawwali "Qurbani Qurbani Qurbani" from Qurbani (1980) etc.

=== Ghazals ===
Kishore Kumar sang ghazals like "Peechhli Yaad Bhula Do" from Mehndi (1983), "Aisi Haseen Chandni" from Dard (1981), "Yun Neend Se Woh Jaan-E-Chaman" from Dard Ka Rishta (1982), "Tera Chehra Mejhe Gulab Lage" from Aapas Ki Baat (1981) and "Sarakti Jaaye Hai Rukh Se Naqaab" from film Deedar-e-Yaar (1982) with Lata Mangeshkar under the music direction of Laxmikant-Pyarelal and penned by famous Urdu shayar Ameer Meenai and many more.

== Personal life ==
Kumar was married four times. His first wife was Bengali singer and actress Ruma Guha Thakurta aka Ruma Ghosh. Their marriage lasted from 28 February 1951 to 1958. While the exact date of their separation is not known, it was probably during the fag end of the shoot of Lukochuri that they separated. Their son, former actor and singer Amit Kumar Ganguly was born on 3 July 1952.

Kumar's relationship with actress Madhubala was the subject of much media attention. Madhubala had worked with Kumar in many films including his home production Chalti Ka Naam Gaadi (1958) and Jhumroo (1961). According to Madhubala's sister Madhur Bhushan, after Madhubala's relationship with actor Dilip Kumar ended, Madhubala got involved with Kishore who was going through a divorce from Ruma. Their love affair went on for three years through the making of Chalti Ka Naam Gaadi and Half Ticket. Madhubala was ill and was planning to travel to London for treatment. She had a ventricular septal defect (hole in the heart). The couple had a civil wedding in 1960. Kumar reportedly converted to Islam and changed his name to Karim Abdul, but Madhubala's sister has refuted such claims, saying that Kumar remained a Hindu. The couple also had a Hindu wedding ceremony to please Kumar's parents. His parents refused to attend the ceremony. Their marriage ended with Madhubala's death on 23 February 1969.

"I knew she (Madhubala) was very sick even before I married her. But a promise is a promise. So I kept my word and brought her home as my wife, even though I knew she was dying from a congenital heart problem. For 9 long years, I nursed her. I watched her die before my own eyes. You can never understand what this means until you live through this yourself. She was such a beautiful woman and she died so painfully. She would rave and rant and scream in frustration. How can such an active person spend 9 long years bed-ridden? And I had to humour her all the time. That's what the doctor asked me to. That's what I did till her very last breath. I would laugh with her. I would cry with her."

— Kishore Kumar on his relationship with Madhubala

Kumar's third marriage was to Yogeeta Bali, and lasted from 1976 to 4 August 1978. Kumar was married to Leena Chandavarkar from 1980 until his death. Their son Sumit Kumar Ganguly was born on 15 April 1982.

Kumar is said to have been paranoid about not being paid. During recordings, he would sing only after his secretary confirmed that the producer had made the payment. On one occasion, when he discovered that his dues had not been fully paid, he appeared on set with makeup on only one side of his face. When the director questioned him, he replied "Aadha paisa to aadha make-up." (Half make-up for half payment.) On the sets of Bhai Bhai, Kumar refused to act because the director M. V. Raman owed him ₹ 5,000. Ashok Kumar persuaded him to do the scene but when the shooting started, Kishore walked a few paces and said, Paanch Hazaar Rupaiya (five thousand rupees) and did a somersault. After he reached the end of the floor, he left the studio. On another occasion, when producer R. C. Talwar did not pay his dues in spite of repeated reminders, Kumar arrived at Talwar's residence shouting "Hey Talwar, de de mere aath hazaar" ("Hey Talwar, give me my eight thousand") every morning until Talwar paid up.

In spite of his "no money, no work" principle, sometimes Kumar recorded for free even when the producers were willing to pay. Such films include those produced by Rajesh Khanna and Danny Denzongpa. Kishore helped actor-turned-producer Bipin Gupta by giving him ₹ 20,000 for the film Daal Me Kala (1964). When actor Arun Kumar Mukherjee, one of the first persons to appreciate Kishore's singing talent, died, Kumar regularly sent money to Mukherjee's family in Bhagalpur.

According to Kumar's elder son Amit, Kumar did a lot of charity and free shows for jawans and cancer patients but he never spoke about it. Kumar was a homebody and avoided the trappings of stardom. He was an early riser and went to bed early. He loved authentic Bengali food, and was deeply emotional, a side which he seldom expressed and was also philosophic. Kumar was fond of Biblical films and liked sitting in a cemetery.

The film Anand (1971) was originally supposed to star Kishore and Mehmood Ali in the lead. Hrishikesh Mukherjee, the director of the film, was asked to meet Kishore to discuss the project. When he went to Kumar's house, however he was driven away by the gatekeeper due to a misunderstanding. Kumar—himself a Bengali—had not been paid for a stage show organised by another Bengali man and had instructed his gatekeeper to drive away this "Bengali", if he ever visited the house. Consequently, Mehmood had to leave the film as well, and new actors (Rajesh Khanna and Amitabh Bachchan) were signed for the film.

Many journalists and writers have written about Kumar's seemingly eccentric behaviour. He placed a sign that said "Beware of Kishore" at the door of his Warden Road flat. Once, producer-director H. S. Rawail, who owed him money, visited his flat to pay the dues. Kumar took the money and when Rawail offered to shake hands with him, reportedly Kishore put Rawail's hand in his mouth, bit it and asked "Didn't you see the sign?". Rawail laughed off the incident and left quickly. According to another reported incident, once Kumar was due to record a song for producer-director G. P. Sippy. As Sippy approached his bungalow, he saw Kumar going out in his car. Sippy asked Kumar to stop his car but Kumar increased his speed. Sippy chased him to Madh Island where Kumar finally stopped his car near the ruined Madh Fort. When Sippy questioned his strange behaviour, Kumar refused to recognise or talk to him and threatened to call the police. The next morning, Kumar reported for the recording session. An angry Sippy questioned him about his behaviour the previous day but Kumar said that Sippy must have dreamt the incident and said that he was in Khandwa on the previous day.

Once, a producer went to court to get a decree that Kumar must follow the director's orders. As a consequence, he obeyed the director to the letter. He refused to alight from his car until the director ordered him to do so. After filming a car scene in Bombay, Kumar drove until he reached Khandala because the director forgot to say "Cut". In the 1960s, a financier named Kalidas Batvabbal, who was disgusted with Kumar's alleged lack of cooperation during the shooting of Half Ticket, reported to the income tax authorities, who raided his house. Later, Kumar invited Batvabbal to his home, asked him to enter a cupboard for a chat and locked him inside. He unlocked Batvabbal after two hours and told him, "Don't ever come to my house again".

Kumar was a loner; in a 1985 interview with Pritish Nandy he said that he had no friends—he preferred talking to his trees instead. Once, when a reporter made a comment about how lonely he must be, Kumar took her to his garden, named some of the trees there and introduced them to the reporter as his closest friends.

After Kishore Kumar recorded his Rabindra Sangeet album for Megaphone Records, he was supposed to also record Nazrul Geeti songs for Megaphone Records after he recorded Rabindra Sangeet, but that never materialised.

== Death ==
Having grown unhappy with the changing songwriting tastes of music directors, Kishore Kumar decided to retire by September 1987, planning to return to his birthplace of Khandwa.

Kishore Kumar died suddenly of a heart attack in Bombay at 4:45 p.m. on 13 October 1987, his brother Ashok Kumar's 76th birthday. His body was taken to Khandwa for cremation. The day before his death, Kishore made his final recording, "Guru Guru", a duet with Asha Bhosle for the film Waqt Ki Awaz (1988) composed by Bappi Lahiri for Mithun Chakraborty and Sridevi. Kumar's funeral procession was one of the largest for a non-political film personality, with an estimated total of around five-to-seven thousand people in various locations around Bombay, including his house in Gauri Kunj, Bandra, Santa Cruz, Linking Road, Khar, Dharavi and R.K. Studios in Chembur. A larger crowd numbering between 90,000 and 150,000 people gathered upon the arrival of his body in Khandwa for cremation as per his wishes.

His untimely death plunged the region's film industry into shock and mourning. Many veterans of the industry released an outpouring of tributes, including Raj Kapoor, Dev Anand, Rajesh Khanna, Pran, Nutan, Manoj Kumar, Vinod Khanna, Rajendra Kumar, Randhir Kapoor, Om Prakash, Vinod Mehra, B.R. Chopra, Suresh Oberoi, Danny Denzongpa, Lata Mangeshkar, Asha Bhosle, Hemlata, Mohammed Aziz, Shabbir Kumar, Bappi Lahiri, R.D. Burman, Kalyanji-Anandji, Ravindra Jain, Sulakshana Pandit, Lalit Pandit, Vijayta Pandit, Shyamal Mitra, Anand Bakshi, Gulzar, Khayyam, Balasaheb Thackeray, Salil Chaudhary, Tanuja Mukherjee, Saira Banu, Pradeep Kumar, Poonam Dhillon, Deepti Naval, Mala Sinha, Nadeem-Shravan, Abhijeet Bhattacharya, Alka Yagnik, Vijay Anand, Chetan Anand, Johnny Lever, Amrish Puri, Anu Malik, Javed Akhtar, Salim Khan, Uttam Singh, and many others.

Recalling the day of Kishore Kumar's death and the final interaction they shared, his wife Leena Chandavarkar was quoted as saying:

On the morning of 13 October 1987, he looked pale and as though in deep sleep. As I went near him, he woke up and asked, 'Did you get scared? Today is my holiday'." That day he had several meetings at home. During lunch he told me that we'd watch the film River of No Return in the evening. A little later, I heard him move furniture in the next room. When I went to see what was happening, I saw him lying on the bed. Nervously he said, 'I'm feeling weak'. I ran to call the doctor. He got angry and said, 'If you call the doctor, I'll get a heart-attack'. Those were his last lines. His eyes were wide open and he was breathing out. I thought he was fooling as usual but that was the end.

== Legacy ==
Singers like Kumar Sanu, Abhijeet Bhattacharya, Ayushmann Khurrana, Amit Kumar, Sudesh Bhosale, Vinod Rathod, Roop Kumar Rathod were influenced by Kishore Kumar's style of singing. Many other singers like KK, Mohit Chauhan, Neeti Mohan, Raageshwari, Sagarika, Shaan, Shilpa Rao, Zubeen Garg have been inspired by Kumar.

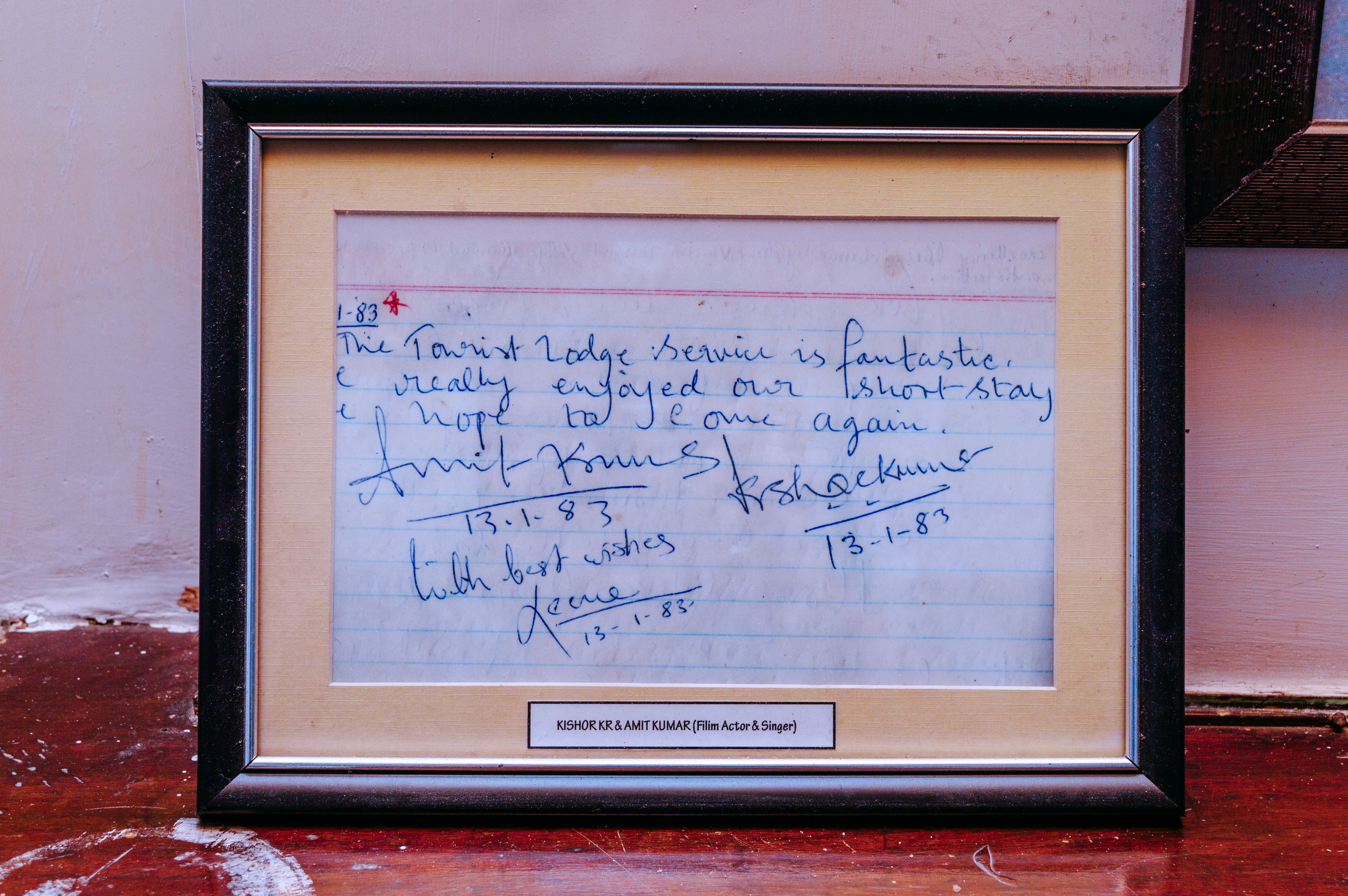
Morgan House, Kalimpong Testimonial of Kishore Kumar, his wife Leena Chandavarkar and his son Amit Kumar

Kingdom of Dreams, a project of the Great Indian Nautanki Company jointly owned by Wizcraft International Entertainment and Apra Group launched a musical comedy Jhumroo on 7 April 2012 which is a tribute to Kumar and his legacy to music and Hindi films. The musical comedy features 19 retro songs of Kumar's.

Kumar was inducted into the Bollywood Walk of Fame at Bandra Bandstand, where his autograph was preserved.

A statue of Kumar was installed on Southern Avenue, Kolkata on 22 October 2018.

An album titled Baba Mere made by Kumar's son Amit was released on his 86th birthday. It shows Kumar's granddaughter Muktika Ganguly waking up in the middle of the night and in her dreams she meets her grandfather. Amit Kumar termed the album as the greatest tribute to his father Kishore Kumar.

In 2015, the UK-based newspaper Eastern Eye placed Kumar fourth in their "Greatest 20 Bollywood Playback Singers" list. Kumar was also included among the top ten most searched Indian singers on Google Search in 2016.

In the Outlook Music Poll conducted by Outlook magazine in June 2010, three songs were tied for the second place, out of which one was sung by Kishore. The song was "Kuch Toh Log Kahenge, Logon Ka Kaam Hai Kehna" from Amar Prem (1972). This poll was published in Outlook. The jury included people in the Indian music industry.

In 2013, Kumar was voted "The Most Popular Male Playback Singer" in a poll conducted by the Filmfare magazine. Kumar won the poll with 38% of the votes.

Marking the centenary of Hindi Cinema, CNN-IBN conducted a poll about the "Greatest Voice of Hindi Cinema" in which Kishore Kumar won the second place with 33.6% of the votes. The poll saw neck-to-neck competition between Rafi (who ultimately attained victory by a slim margin of 1.72% having gained 35.32%) and Kishore Kumar, followed by Lata Mangeshkar (24.59%), Mukesh (3.33%) and Asha Bhosle (3.16%) respectively.

There have been appeals to the Government of India to honour the singer-actor posthumously with Bharat Ratna(India's Highest Civilian Award).

Manna Dey, who was once his contemporary, said that "Kishore had the best voice of all playback singers. He made singing sound so effortless. He had no classical training but could surpass me in a song because of his wonderful musical instinct and natural singing flair."

Playback singer Asha Bhosle has said that:

It is impossible for anyone to take Kishore Kumar's place. Kishore Kumar was one of a kind. He swayed everyone with his mellifluous voice and even made everyone around him always happy. He has been a true gem to the music industry.

Actor Rajesh Khanna said "Kishore Kumar was my soul and I was his body."

Actress Vyjayanthimala said:

I did several films with Kishore Kumar. He was always full of fun and frolic. You couldn't really predict what he was up to. It was wonderful working with him. Being a singer, he was so quick in his rhythm and quick in his reflexes while dancing. It was easy to match his steps and he was comfortable with me too. He used to tell me, 'Aap to taal mein karte hai sab to bahut hi achha lagta hai mujhe. Betaali ho jati hai to mushkil padta hai.' (It's nice that you dance in rhythm. It's difficult if rhythms don't match.)

Hindi film superstar Amitabh Bachchan called Kishore Kumar a multitalented genius who shall remain a phenomenal star.

Former cricketer and batsman Sachin Tendulkar said:

Kishore Kumar's music has been a constant companion of mine and I feel his songs are truly timeless.

Kumar's unreleased song was sold for Rs 15.6 lakh at the Osian's Cinefan Auction, New Delhi in 2012, the highest price bid for any Indian singer. The song was "Tum Hi To Woh Ho", written by Kulwant Jani with music by Usha Khanna. This was for a film called Khel Tamasha by Rakesh Kumar, which never got made. The song was recorded just three days before his death in October 1987.

Today Kumar's popularity spans across many countries of South Asia, especially Pakistan.

Digitally-colorized version of Kumar's film, Half Ticket (in 2012), has been released theatrically.

Sony TV organised the television singing contest K For Kishore to search for a singer like Kumar.

Today Kumar's popular songs continue to be remixed or recreated.

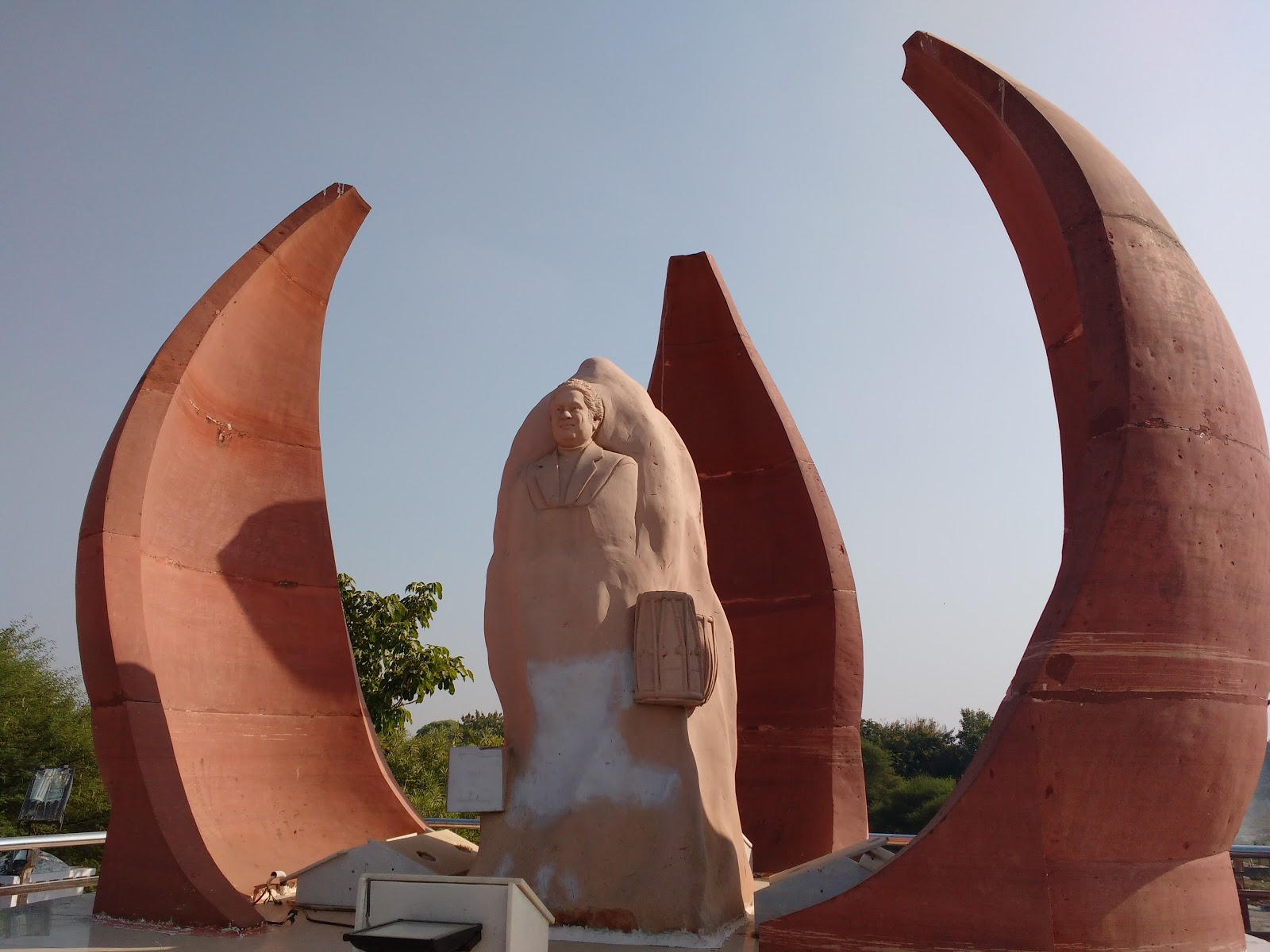
Kishore Kumar memorial on the outskirts of Khandwa

In his memory, the government of Madhya Pradesh has set up a memorial on the outskirts of Khandwa. It is open to public and has his life sized statue in a lotus-shaped structure. It also houses a mini-theatre and museum dedicated to him. On his birth and death anniversary each year, a function is held and many fans participate. The mini-theatre also screens his films on these days.

A large number of musical tributes, special programmes and functions are inspired on his birth and death anniversaries every year. As well as fans of Kumar and music lovers from Khandwa make offerings of 'doodh jalebi', which was Kumar's favourite dish at his memorial annually on his birth anniversary.

== In popular culture ==
- Kumar was commemorated on his 85th birth anniversary by Google which showed a special doodle on its Indian home page for him on 4 August 2014.
- Kumar's song "Pal Bhar Ke Liye" from the film Johny Mera Naam (1970) was used in an episode of The Simpsons titled "Kiss Kiss, Bang Bangalore". His songs have also been featured in several films, including Such a Long Journey (1998) and Side Streets (1998).
- In 1996, nine years after his death, Kumar's vocals from the song "Saala Main Toh Saab Ban Gaya" were used in the movie, Raja Hindustani and picturised on Aamir Khan. Kumar originally sung it for Dilip Kumar and it is from the film, Sagina.
- The Bengali drama movie Kishore Kumar Junior directed by Kaushik Ganguly was dedicated to Kumar and his fans.
- A Bengali chart buster song "Amar Shilpi Tumi Kishore Kumar" sung by singer Kumar Sanu was dedicated to the memory of Kishore.
- Kumar's song "Yeh Jawani Hai Deewani" from the film Jawani Diwani (1972) was recreated in the 2019 film Student of the Year 2, a sequel to Student of the Year, with music composed by Vishal–Shekhar, and sung by Vishal Dadlani and Payal Dev, and Kishore Kumar (only singing the lyric tune of Yeh Jawani Hai Deewani).
  - The phrase is also the title of the 2013 film of the same name.

== See also ==
- Music of Bollywood
- List of Indian playback singers
