= Ravi (composer) =

Indian composer (1926–2012)

- Ravi in his later years
- Born: Ravi Shankar Sharma; 3 March 1926; Delhi, British India
- Died: 7 March 2012 (aged 86); Mumbai, Maharashtra, India
- Other name: Bombay Ravi
- Occupation: Film music director
- Years active: 1955–2005
- Spouse: Kanti (m. 1946; died 1986)
- Children: 3
- Relatives: Varsha Usgaonkar (daughter-in-law)

Ravi Shankar Sharma (3 March 1926 – 7 March 2012), often referred mononymously as Ravi, was an Indian music director who had composed music for several Hindi and Malayalam films. After a successful career in Hindi cinema, he took a hiatus in the 1970s and made a successful comeback in 1982 in the Malayalam music scene under the stage name Bombay Ravi.

== Biography ==
Ravi was born in Delhi on 3 March 1926. He had no formal training in classical music; instead he learned music by listening to his father sing bhajans. In 1947 he went to meet the famous singer Mohammed Rafi who was singing at the independence day celebration event ‘Jashn e Jamhooriat’ at the Coronation Hotel, Fatehpur, Delhi. He told Rafi that he wanted to be a music director. According to Ravi, Mohammed Rafi advised him to first learn music and notation. He taught himself to play the harmonium and other classical instruments and worked as an electrician at the Post and Telegraph, Delhi, to support his family. In 1950, he decided to shift to Bombay and become a professional singer. At first Ravi was homeless, living on the streets and sleeping on Malad railway station at night. Later, he lived in a tin house before he became a success story.

In 1952, Ravi was discovered by Hemant Kumar who hired him to sing backing vocals in Vande Mataram from the film Anand Math (1952 film). Hemant Kumar was not very familiar with the Urdu language, so Ravi would help him out.

Ravi composed several hit songs and received Filmfare nominations for the following films: Chaudhvin Ka Chand (1960), Do Badan (1966), Hamraaz (1967), Ankhen (1968), and Nikaah (1982). He won Filmfare awards for Gharana (1961) and Khandan (1965). His other successful films include Waqt, Neel Kamal and Gumraah. His songs Aaj mere yaar ki shaadi hai, Babul ki duyaen leti ja, Doli chadh ke dulhan sasural chali and Mere Yaar Bana hai Dulha became very popular in wedding celebrations.

Ravi was one of the music directors who shaped the career of Asha Bhosle with songs like Tora man darpan kehlaye, Aage bhi jane na tu and Sun le Pukar Aai. He was also instrumental in making Mahendra Kapoor a popular singer in Bollywood. After a successful career in Hindi films during the 1950s and 1960s, he took a long break after 1970 till 1982. In 1982, he gave music for the Hindi film Nikaah, and one of the film's songs Dil ke armaan aansooyon main beh gaye sung by Salma Agha won her the Filmfare Best Female Playback Award.

In the 1980s, he made a comeback as a music director in Malayalam (and some Hindi) films as Bombay Ravi. During 1986, the Malayalam director Hariharan convinced him to make this comeback. The first movie was Panchagni. The songs Saagarangale and Aa raatri maanju poyi (sung by Yesudas and Chitra) were hits. That same year, Hariharan's Nakhakshathangal also came out and Chithra won her second National Award for the song Manjalprasaadavum from the same film. All the songs from the Malayalam movie Vaisali released in 1989 were super hits and Chithra won her third National Award for the song Indupushpam Choodi Nilkum from the same film. Ravi was a constant in Hariharan films and their combination is regarded as one of the best ever in Malayalam. Ravi has composed for many films produced by South Indian banners: Ghoonghat, Gharana Grihasti, Aurat, Samaj ko badal dalo (Gemini), Meherban, Do Kaliyan (AVM), Bharosa, and Khandan (Vasu Films).

Ravi's most notable work is with Chopra brothers. From Gumrah he continuously worked with Sahir Ludhianvi, the lyricist. Waqt, Humraaz, Admi aur Insan, Dhund, Nikah and Dehleez were among his all-time hit films He was very comfortable with Sahir and gave beautiful tunes to his poetry also for Aaj aur kal, Kajal, Ankhein, Neelkamal, Do kaliyan, Amanat, Ganga tera pani amrit, and Ek mahal ho sapno ka.

== Personal life ==
Ravi's wife Kanti, whom he married in 1946, died in 1986. He had two daughters Veena and Chhaya and a son Ajay. His estranged son Ajay is married to Varsha Usgaonkar who is a Marathi and Hindi film actress. They are estranged due to a property dispute. One of his daughters was living with him and taking care of him since his wife's death.

Ravi died on 7 March 2012 in Mumbai at the age of 86.

== Awards ==
- Padma Shri Award by the Government of India in 1971
- National Film Award for Best Music Direction (1994), Parinayam, Sukrutham
- Kerala State Film Award for Best Music Director (1986, 1992), Nakhakshathangal, Sargam
- Kerala State Film Award for Best Background Music (1993), Ghazal
- Filmfare Award for Best Music Director – Malayalam for Parinayam – 1994
- Filmfare Award for Best Music Director, (1962, 1966) in films Gharana (1961), Khandan (1965)
- Sanskriti Kalashree Award (2006–07), Chennai, Tamil Nadu

== Filmography ==
=== Hindi ===
Ravi was responsible for a number of hit tunes of Hindi film songs. His music went on to inspire later day music directors too. The opening bars of "Chanda Mama Door Ke" inspired the tune for the hit song "Ek Do Teen" in the 1988 film Tezaab. Ravi is reportedly quoted as saying, "Since I choose written poetry to compose, the lyricist and the composer have full freedom to write and compose."

- Vachan (1955)
- Albeli (1955)
- Inspector (1956) as music assistant
- Ek Saal (1957)
- Narsi Bhagat (1957)
- Dilli Ka Thug (1958)
- Dulhan (1958)
- Ghar Sansar (1958)
- Mehndi (1958)
- Chirag Kahan Roshni Kahan (1959)
- Jawani Ki Hawa (1959)
- Nai Raahen (1959)
- Apna Ghar (1960)
- Chaudhvin Ka Chand (1960)
- Ghunghat (1960)
- Tu Nahin Aur Sahi (1960)
- Modern Girl (1961)
- Gharana (1961)
- Nazrana (1961)
- Pyaar Ka Saagar (1961)
- Wanted (1961)
- Salaam Memsaheb (1961)
- China Town (1962)
- Baaje Ghungroo (1962)
- Rakhi (1962)
- Tower House (1962)
- Girls' Hostel (1962)
- Isi Ka Naam Duniya Hai (1962)
- Bombay Ka Chor (1962)
- Aaj Aur Kal (1963)
- Gehra Daag (1963)
- Gumrah (1963)
- Pyar Ka Bandhan (1963)
- Nartaki (1963)
- Ustadon Ke Ustaad (1963)
- Yeh Rastey Hain Pyar Ke (1963)
- Bharosa (1963)
- Mulzim (1963)
- Pyaar Kiya To Darna Kya (1963)
- Grahasti (1963)
- Kaun Apna Kaun Paraya (1963)
- Door Ki Awaz (1964)
- Shehnai (1964)
- Kaajal (1965)
- Khandan (1965)
- Waqt (1965)
- Bahu Beti (1965)
- Do Badan (1966)
- Dus Lakh (1966)
- Phool Aur Patthar (1966)
- Sagaai (1966)
- Yeh Zindagi Kitni Haseen Hai (1966)
- Aurat (1967)
- Hamraaz (1967)
- Mehrban (1967)
- Nai Roshni (1967)
- Aankhen (1968)
- Do Kaliyan (1968)
- Gauri (1968)
- Man Ka Meet (1968)
- Neel Kamal (1968)
- Paisa Ya Pyaar (1969)
- Aadmi Aur Insaan (1969)
- Anmol Moti (1969)
- Badi Didi (1969)
- Doli (1969)
- Ek Phool Do Mali (1969)
- Samaj Ko Badal Dalo (1970)
- Chingari (1971)
- Babul Ki Galiyaan (1972)
- Dharkan (1972)
- Naag Panchami (1972)
- Dhund (1973)
- Mehmaan (1973)
- Sone Ke Hath (1973)
- Ghatana (1974)
- Ek Mahal Ho Sapno Ka (1975)
- Vandana (1975)
- Amaanat (1977)
- Aadmi Sadak Ka (1977)
- Premika (1980)
- Nikaah (1982)
- Aaj Ki Awaz (1984)
- Mujhe Shaktee Do (1984)
- Hum Do Hamare Do (1984)
- Tawaif (1985)
- Khamosh Nigahen (1986)
- Dahleez (1986)
- Awam (1987)
- Ghar Ka Sukh (1987)
- Meraa Suhaag (1987)
- Ek Alag Mausam (2003)

=== Malayalam (as Bombay Ravi and Ravi Bombay) ===
- Panchagni (1986)
- Nakhakshathangal (1986)
- Vaishali (1988)
- Oru Vadakkan Veeragatha (1989)
- Vidhyarambham (1990)
- Sargam (1992)
- Ghazal (1993)
- Patheyam (1993)
- Parinayam (1994)
- Sukrutham (1994)
- Kalivaakku (not released) (1996)
- Five Star Hospital (1997)
- Manassil Oru Manjuthulli (2000)
- Mayookham (2005)

=== Punjabi ===
- Sajjan Thug (1981)
- Sassi Punnu (1983)

=== Telugu ===
- Sarigamalu (1994)

=== Non-movie audio album (Malayalam) ===
- Aavani Kanavukal (1997)
