= List of songs recorded by Amit Kumar =

Songs by Amit Kumar
Film songs
Hindi songs	295
Bengali songs	122
Marathi songs	6
Odia songs	2
Malayalam songs	1
Total	426

Amit Kumar (born 3 July 1952) has sung 760 songs in Hindi films. The following is a complete list of songs recorded by him:

== Film songs ==
=== 1970s ===
Year	Film	No.	Song	Composer(s)	Writer(s)	Co-artist(s)	Note
1971	Door Ka Raahi	1	"Main Ek Panchi Matwala Re"	Kishore Kumar			Credited as "Amit Ganguly"
1974	Badhti Ka Naam Dadhi	2	"Sun Chache Bol Bhatije"	Kishore Kumar			
1975	Zindagi Aur Toofan	3	"Main Bhi To Akela Hoon"	Laxmikant-Pyarelal	Ram Bhardwaj	Asha Bhosle	
1975	Mounto	4	"Door Door Se Aai Hoon Main"	Kalyanji–Anandji	Verma Malik	Asha Bhosle	
1975	Jaan Hazir Hai	5	"Are Meri Chamak Challo"	Jaikumar Parte	Shailey Shailendra	Usha Timothy	
1975	Jaan Hazir Hai	6	"Bhaande Phoot Jayenge"	Jaikumar Parte	Shailey Shailendra	Manhar	
1975	Jaan Hazir Hai	7	"Ye Shehri Mor Dekha"	Jaikumar Parte	Shailey Shailendra	Dilraj Kaur	
1975	Jaan Hazir Hai	8	"Hum Na Rahenge"	Jaikumar Parte	Shailey Shailendra		
1975	Qaid	9	"Yeh Dil De De De Yeh Jaan Le Le"	Nitin–Mangesh	Maya Govind	Anjali	
1975	Chori Mera Kaam	10	"Main Kachche Angoor Ki Bel, Aayi Karne Dilon Ka Mel, Mera Pyar Hai Awara"	Kalyanji–Anandji	Verma Malik	Kishore Kumar, Kanchan	
1975	Aandhi	11	"Salam Kijiye"	R. D. Burman	Gulzar	Mohammed Rafi, Bhupinder Singh	
1975	Anokha	12	"Jab Aai Hai Gaonse Hamar Goribala"	Kalyanji–Anandji	Indeevar	Mahendra Kapoor, Chorus	
1976	Aap Beati	13	"Kismat Ki Baat"	Laxmikant-Pyarelal	Anand Bakshi	Kishore Kumar	
1976	Dhongee	14	"Rangon Ki Chhanv Dhoop Mein"	R. D. Burman	Anand Bakshi	Asha Bhosle, Kishore Kumar	
1976	Balika Badhu	15	"Bade Achhe Lagte Hain"	R. D. Burman	Anand Bakshi	R.D. Burman	
1976	Deewaangee	16	"Hasino Ke Chakkar Me Padna Nahi"	Ravindra Jain		Kishore Kumar	
1976	Phool Aur Insan	17	"Mujhe Pyar Hai Tumse"	Surinder Kohli	Arsh Dalawari	Meenakshi	
1977	Duniyadari	18	"Teen Baaje Bola Tha, Baaj Gaye Chaat"	Shankar–Jaikishan	M G Hashmat	Asha Bhosle	
1977	Ek Hi Rastaa	19	"Dil Ko Mila Lo"	Rajesh Roshan	Verma Malik	Asha Bhosle	
1977	Parvarish	20	"Bandh Aankh Se Dekh Tamasha"	Laxmikant–Pyarelal	Majrooh Sultanpuri	Kishore Kumar	
1977	Parvarish	21	"Jaate Ho Jaane Jaana"	Laxmikant–Pyarelal	Majrooh Sultanpuri	Asha Bhosle, Aarti Mukherjee, Shailendra Singh	
1977	Daku Aur Mahatma	22	"Ho Meri Pyaari Jalebi Rashbhari"	Ravindra Jain		Hemlata	
1977	Haiwan	23	"Maan Na Maan Mai Teri Mehmaan"	Bappi Lahiri	Gauhar Kanpuri	Krishna Mukherjee	
1977	Haiwan	24	"O Deewani Raja Raani Kahani"	Bappi Lahiri	Amit Khanna		
1977	Kali Raat	25	"Are Hansti Jaogi"	Laxmikant–Pyarelal	Majrooh Sultanpuri		
1977	Ladki Jawan Ho Gayi	26	"Are Ja Dilphenk Aashiq"	Sonik-Omi	Vishweshwar Sharma		
1978	Anjane Mein	27	"Jeevan Ke Sab Sukh Paye Tu" (Male)	Kalyanji–Anandji	Gulshan Bawra		
1978	Chor Ke Ghar Chor	28	"Ho Sake To Kar Lo Mujhse Pyar Sarkar Thoda Thoda"	Kalyanji–Anandji	Yogesh	Kanchan	
1978	Kasme Vaade	29	"Aati Rahengi Baharen" - I	R. D. Burman	Gulshan Bawra	Kishore Kumar, Asha Bhosle	
1978	Kasme Vaade	30	"Aati Rahengi Baharen" (Sad)	R. D. Burman	Gulshan Bawra		
1978	Mezaan	31	"Gussa Ho Kar"	R. D. Burman	Nida Fazli	Asha Bhosle, R. D. Burman	
1978	Ganga Ki Saugand	32	Dekho Sapne"	Kalyanji Anandji	Anjaan	Mohammed Rafi, Aarti Mukherji	
1978	Darwaza	33	Hosh Mein Hum Kahan	Sapan–Jagmohan	Naqsh Lyallpuri		
1978	Nasbandi	34	"Kiski Chali Hai Kiski Chali Hai"	Kalyanji–Anandji	Hullad Moradabadi	Nitin Mukesh	
1978	Nasbandi	35	"Dama Dam Mast Qalandar"	Kalyanji–Anandji	Hullad Moradabadi	Nitin Mukesh	
1978	Des Pardes	36	"Nazar Lage Naa Saathiyon"	Rajesh Roshan	Amit Khanna	Kishore Kumar, Vijay Benedict, Manhar Udhas	
1978	Khatta Meetha	37	"Roll Roll"	Rajesh Roshan	Gulzar	Kishore Kumar	
1978	Khatta Meetha	38	"Frenny O Frenny"	Rajesh Roshan	Gulzar	Shailendra Singh	
1978	Lal Kothi	39	"Dhala Din Ayse"	Sapan–Jagmohan	Naqsh Lall Puri	Asha Bhosle	
1978	Phandebaaz	40	"Bade Bade Logo Ke Yaar Bade Bade Hai Raaz"	R. D. Burman	Anand Bakshi	Mohammed Rafi	
1978	Toote Khilone	41	"Kya Jane Yeh Duniya"	Bappi Lahiri	Kaifi Azmi	Sulakshana Pandit	
1979	Baton Baton Mein	42	"Na Bole Tum, Na Maine Kuch Kaha"	Rajesh Roshan	Yogesh	Asha Bhosle	
1979	Baton Baton Mein	43	"Uthe Sabke Kadam, Dekho Rum Pum Pum"	Rajesh Roshan	Amit Khanna	Lata Mangeshkar	
1979	Duniya Meri Jeb Mein	44	"Dekh Mausam Keh Raha Hai, Baahon Mein Aake Meri"	Rajesh Roshan	Gulshan Bawra	Lata Mangeshkar	
1979	Gol Maal	45	"Ek Din Sapne Me Dekha Sapna"	R. D. Burman	Gulzar	Kishore Kumar	
1979	Hamare Tumhare	46	"Tu Meri Mehbooba Hai"	R. D. Burman	Yogesh		
1979	Pehredaar	47	"Ruk Jao Are Jane Walo"	Sapan–Jagmohan	Mahender Dehlavi	Mohammed Rafi, Bhupinder, Aarti Mukherjee	
1979	Prem Vivah	48	"Milte Rahiye, Milne Se Dil Mil Jayenge"	Laxmikant-Pyarelal	Anand Bakshi	Kishore Kumar	
1979	Shabhash Daddy	49	"Daur-e-Khizaan Tha"	Kishore Kumar	Irshad		
1979	Shabhash Daddy	50	"Chalta Chala Jaoon Mai"	Kishore Kumar	Irshad	Aparna Mayekar	
1979	Shabhash Daddy	51	"Bhini Bhini Ye Bheegi Bheegi Ye"	Kishore Kumar	Irshad	Sulakshana Pandit	
1979	Shabhash Daddy	52	"Daddy Yeh Tumne Kya Kiya"	Kishore Kumar	Irshad		
1979	Shabhash Daddy	53	"Pyar Aur Shaadi"	Kishore Kumar	Irshad	Kishore Kumar	
1979	Dhongee	54	"Rangon Ki Dhoop Chhaon Mein"	R. D. Burman	Anand Bakshi	Kishore Kumar, Asha Bhosle	
1979	Dil Kaa Heera	55	"Zindagi Ka Yoon Jubaan Par Naam Aana Chaahiye" (Version 1)	Laxmikant–Pyarelal	Anand Bakshi	Asha Bhosle, Mohammed Rafi	
1979	Dil Kaa Heera	56	"Zindagi Ka Yoon Jubaan Par Naam Aana Chaahiye" (Version 2)	Laxmikant–Pyarelal	Anand Bakshi	Asha Bhosle, Mohammed Rafi	
1979	Atmaram	57	"Are Din Bakhsa Are Dayaram"	Shankar-Jaikishan	M.G. Hashmat	Manna Dey	

=== 1980s ===
Year	Film	No	Song	Composer(s)	Writer(s)	Co-artist(s)	Note
1980	Bambai Ka Maharaja	58	"Mil Gaya Mil Gaya"	Usha Khanna	Anjaan	Asha Bhosle	
1980	Chaal Baaz	59	"Hai Shaam Badi Matwali"	Madan Mohan	Yogesh	Asha Bhosle	
1980	Jaayen To Jaayen Kahan	60	"Gori Tere Ang Ang Lagayenge Rang"	K. Babuji	Vitthalbhai Patel	Asha Bhosle	
1980	Jaayen To Jaayen Kahan	61	"Chalti Hai Gaadi, Chadhna Maana Hai"	K. Babuji	Vitthalbhai Patel	Asha Bhosle	
1980	Nazrana Pyar Ka	62	"Naya Saal Aaye, Tamase Dikhaye"	Hemant Bhosle	Nida Fazli	Asha Bhosle, Anwar	
1980	Hum Paanch	63	"Ka Jaanu Main Sajaniya"	Laxmikant Pyarelal	Anand Bakshi	Lata Mangeshkar	
1980	Hum Paanch	64	"Hum Paanch Pandav Ye Shakuni Mama"	Laxmikant Pyarelal	Anand Bakshi	Shailendra Singh, Anwar, Suresh Wadkar	
1981	Naari	65	"Neeche Zameen Oopar Gagan"	Shankar-Jaikishan	M.G. Hashmat	Yesudas	
1981	Naari	66	"Neeche Zameen Oopar Gagan" (Sad)	Shankar-Jaikishan	M.G. Hashmat		
1981	Bhaagya	67	"Jaagte Sote Hue"	Ravindra Jain		Hemlata	
1981	Tajurba	68	"Ek Nahin Hum Do Nahin"	Usha Khanna	Asad Bhopali	Suresh Wadkar, Hemlata, Shabbir Kumar & Usha Khanna	
1981	Fiffty Fiffty	69	"Chhod Maza Haath, Maala Peene De"	Laxmikant Pyarelal	Anand Bakshi	Asha Bhosle	
1981	Love Story	70	"Kaisa Tera Pyar, Kaisa Gussa Hai Tera, Tauba Sanam"	R. D. Burman	Anand Bakshi	Lata Mangeshkar	
1981	Love Story	71	"Dekho Maine Dekha Hai Yeh Ek Sapna"	R. D. Burman	Anand Bakshi	Lata Mangeshkar	
1981	Love Story	72	"Teri Yaad Aa Rahi Hai" (Duet)	R. D. Burman	Anand Bakshi	Lata Mangeshkar	
1981	Love Story	73	"Teri Yaad Aa Rahi Hai" (Solo)	R. D. Burman	Anand Bakshi		
1981	Love Story	74	"Yeh Ladki Zara Si Deewani Lagti Hai"	R. D. Burman	Anand Bakshi	Asha Bhosle	
1982	Teri Kasam	75	"Hum Jis Raste Pe Chale, Us Raste Pe Thi Preet Khadi"	R. D. Burman	Anand Bakshi	Lata Mangeshkar	
1982	Teri Kasam	76	"Geet Woh Hai, Haan Ji Haan"	R. D. Burman	Anand Bakshi		
1982	Teri Kasam	77	"Yeh Zameen Gaa Rahi Hai"	R. D. Burman	Anand Bakshi		
1982	Teri Kasam	78	"Dil Ki Baat Kahin Lab Pe"	R. D. Burman	Anand Bakshi		
1982	Teri Kasam	79	"Kya Hua Ek Baat Par"	R. D. Burman	Anand Bakshi		
1982	Teri Kasam	80	"Mere Geeton Mein"	R. D. Burman	Anand Bakshi		
1982	Zakhmee Insaan	81	"Aaj Teri Aankhon Me"	Nadeem–Shravan	Surendra Sathi		
1982	Zakhmee Insaan	82	"Gham Ka Andhera"	Nadeem–Shravan	Surendra Sathi	Falguni Pathak, Usha Mangeshkar	
1982	Khud-Daar	83	"Oonche Neeche Raaste" (Sad)	Rajesh Roshan	Majrooh Sultanpuri		
1983	Pakhandee	84	"Itna Haseen Tujhsa"	Laxmikant–Pyarelal	Majrooh Sultanpuri	Usha Mangeshkar	
1983	Haadsa	85	"Yeh Bombay Shahar Hai"	Kalyanji–Anandji	M. G. Hashmat		
1983	Haadsa	86	"Pyar Ka Haadsaa"	Kalyanji–Anandji	M. G. Hashmat		
1983	Haadsa	87	"Y O G A"	Kalyanji–Anandji	M. G. Hashmat		
1983	Mahaan	88	"Asli Kya Hai Naqli Kya Hai"	R.D. Burman	Anjaan	Kishore Kumar	
1983	Karate	89	"Maa Ae Maa"	Bappi Lahiri	S.H. Bihari	Kishore Kumar	
1983	Karate	90	"Do Diwane Pyar Ke"	Bappi Lahiri	S.H. Bihari	Kishore Kumar	
1983	Karate	91	"Karate Karate" (Jag Sara Nache)	Bappi Lahiri	S.H. Bihari	Bappi Lahiri	
1984	Jawaani	92	"Gali Gali Dhunda Tujhe, Kone Kone Dekha Re"	R. D. Burman	Gulshan Bawra	Lata Mangeshkar	
1984	Jawaani	93	"Bheega Bheega, Pyara Mausam, Mehki Si Tanhayi"	R. D. Burman	Gulshan Bawra	Asha Bhosle	
1984	Jawaani	94	"Tu Rootha To Main Ro Doongi Sanam"	R. D. Burman	Gulshan Bawra	Asha Bhosle	
1984	Jawaani	95	"Maana Abhi Ho Kamsin Aur Nadaan Ho Tum"	R. D. Burman	Gulshan Bawra		
1984	Jawaani	96	"Halla Gulla Mazaa Hai Jawaani"	R. D. Burman	Gulshan Bawra		
1984	Saaransh	97	"Har Ghadi Dhal Rahi Shaam Hai Zindagi"	Ajit Varman	Vasant Dev		
1985	Yudh	98	"Doston Tum Sabko"	Kalyanji–Anandji	Anand Bakshi	Alka Yagnik, Shailendra Singh	
1985	Yudh	99	"Kya Hua, Kya Nahin"	Kalyanji–Anandji	Anand Bakshi	Asha Bhosle	
1985	Yudh	100	"Yudh Kar" (Fast)	Viju Shah	Anand Bakshi	Alka Yagnik	
1985	Yudh	101	"Yudh Kar" (Slow)	Viju Shah	Anand Bakshi		
1985	Aakhir Kyon?	102	"Dushman Na Kare, Dost Ne Woh Kaam Kiya Hai"	Rajesh Roshan	Indeevar	Lata Mangeshkar	
1985	Aakhir Kyon?	103	"Saat Rang Mein Khel Rahi Hai Dilwalon Ki Toli Re"	Rajesh Roshan	Indeevar	Anuradha Paudwal	
1985	Bond 303	104	"Main Tera Deewana"	R.D. Burman	Gulshan Bawra	Suresh Wadkar and Kalyani Mitra	
1985	Awara Baap	105	"Teri Umar Pachas Ya Pachpan Ki"	R.D. Burman	Verma Malik	Kishore Kumar	
1985	Awara Baap	106	"Umar Sari Humari"	R.D. Burman	Vishweshwar Sharma	Asha Bhosle	
1986	Swarthi	107	"Mera To Irada Hai"	Sapan Jagmohan	M.G. Hashmat		
1986	Ilzaam	108	"I Am A Street Dancer"	Bappi Lahiri	Anjaan		
1986	Ilzaam	109	"Pehle Pehle Pyar Ki, Kya Hai Yeh Deewangi" (Slow)	Bappi Lahiri	Anjaan	Asha Bhosle	
1986	Ilzaam	110	"Pehle Pehle Pyar Ki, Kya Hai Yeh Deewangi" (Fast)	Bappi Lahiri	Anjaan	Asha Bhosle	
1986	Jeeva	111	"Roz Roz Aankhon Tale"	R. D. Burman	Gulzar	Asha Bhosle	
1987	Pyaar Karke Dekho	112	"Aao Dance Karein"	Bappi Lahiri	Indeevar	Vijay Benedict	
1987	Pyaar Karke Dekho	113	"It's My Challenge"	Bappi Lahiri	Indeevar	Vijay Benedict, Asha Bhosle, Bappi Lahiri	
1987	Pyaar Karke Dekho	114	"I Am A Street Dancer"	Bappi Lahiri	Anjaan		
1988	Maalamaal	115	"Maal Hai To Taal Hai"	Anu Malik	Indeevar	Kishore Kumar, Anu Malik, Sudesh Bhosle	Final recorded duet with Kishore Kumar
1988	Maalamaal	116	"Maal Ko Dekhe"	Anu Malik	Indeevar	Kishore Kumar, Anu Malik, Sudesh Bhosle	Final recorded duet with Kishore Kumar
1988	Mera Farz	117	"Phool Se Badan Ki"	Ilaiyaraaja	Indeevar	Kavita Krishnamurthy	Hindi dubbed version
1988	Mera Farz	118	"Sunday Monday Tuesday"	Ilaiyaraaja	Indeevar	Kavita Krishnamurthy	Hindi dubbed version
1988	Mera Farz	119	"Hoton Pe Tak Tak Dhoom"	Ilaiyaraaja	Indeevar	Kavita Krishnamurthy	Hindi dubbed version
1988	Mera Farz	120	"Chandni Meri Lipti Hue"	Ilaiyaraaja	Indeevar	Asha Bhosle	Hindi dubbed version
1988	Mera Farz	121	"Yeh Gulabi Shaam Ka Nasha"	Ilaiyaraaja	Indeevar	Asha Bhosle	Hindi dubbed version
1988	Woh Phir Aayegi	122	"Kya Tan Kya Man"	Anand–Milind	Sameer	S. Janaki	
1988	Hero Hiralal	123	"Main Hoon Hero Hiralal"	Babla Shah	Hriday Lani		
1988	Tezaab	124	"Ek Do Teen"	Laxmikant–Pyarelal	Javed Akhtar	Alka Yagnik	
1988	Tezaab	125	"Keh Do Ke Tum Ho Meri"	Laxmikant–Pyarelal	Javed Akhtar	Anuradha Paudwal	
1988	Rama O Rama	126	"Rama O Rama" (Male)	R. D. Burman	Anand Bakshi		
1989	Rakhwala	127	"O My Love"	Anand–Milind	Sameer	S. Janaki	
1989	Rakhwala	128	"Bombay Meri Hai"	Anand–Milind	Sameer		
1989	Anjaane Rishte	129	"Mud Mud Ke Na Peeche"	Anand–Milind	Majrooh Sultanpuri	Sadhana Sargam	
1989	Anjaane Rishte	130	"Jaao Ji Kaha Jaaoge"	Anand–Milind	Majrooh Sultanpuri	Sadhana Sargam	
1989	Tridev	131	"Tirchi Topiwale"	Kalyanji–Anandji	Anand Bakshi	Sapna Mukherjee	
1989	Tridev	132	"Tirchi Topiwale (Part 2)"	Kalyanji–Anandji	Anand Bakshi	Sapna Mukherjee	
1989	Tridev	133	"Oye Oye"	Kalyanji–Anandji	Anand Bakshi	Udit Narayan, Jolly Mukherjee	
1989	Dost	134	"Hirni Jaisi"	R. D. Burman	Indeevar		
1989	Dost	135	"Tu Hi Heera"	R. D. Burman	Indeevar	Asha Bhosle	
1989	Dost	136	"Step By Step"	R. D. Burman	Indeevar	Asha Bhosle	
1989	Dost	137	"Dil To Chahe Yeh"	R. D. Burman	Indeevar	Asha Bhosle	
1989	Dost	138	"Chhota Sa Parivar"	R. D. Burman	Indeevar	Asha Bhosle	
1989	Mamta Ki Chhaon Mein	139	"Main Ek Panchi Matwala Re"	Kishore Kumar	Kishore Kumar		Recreated from the 1971 film Door Ka Raahi
1989	Mamta Ki Chhaon Mein	140	"Beeti Jaye Zindagi"	Kishore Kumar	Kishore Kumar		
1989	Mamta Ki Chhaon Mein	141	"Todke Bandhan Sare Jeevan Jot Jagaye"	Kishore Kumar	Anjaan		
1989	Mamta Ki Chhaon Mein	142	"Andhiyari Raahon Mein (Duet Version)"	Kishore Kumar	Anjaan	Leena Chandarvarkar, Chorus	
1989	Mamta Ki Chhaon Mein	143	"Andhiyari Raahon Mein (Male Version)"	Kishore Kumar	Anjaan	Chorus	
1989	ChaalBaaz	144	"Na Jaane Kahan Se Aayi Hai"	Laxmikant–Pyarelal	Anand Bakshi	Kavita Krishnamurthy	
1989	ChaalBaaz	145	"Gadbad Ho Gayee"	Laxmikant–Pyarelal	Anand Bakshi	Kavita Krishnamurthy, Jolly Mukherjee	
1989	Aakhri Baazi	146	"Jaan Ki Yeh Baazi"	Anu Malik	Indeevar		Hindi dubbed version
1989	Aakhri Baazi	147	"Ram Se Hai Laxman"	Anu Malik	Indeevar	Suresh Wadkar	Hindi dubbed version
1989	Aakhri Baazi	148	"Chori Chori Aap Mere"	Anu Malik	Indeevar	Sadhana Sargam	Hindi dubbed version
1989	Aakhri Baazi	149	"Hai Re Sama"	Anu Malik	Indeevar	Suresh Wadkar and Sadhana Sargam	Hindi dubbed version
1989	Wasta	150	"Maa Bolo"	Ajit Verman	Vasant Dev		

=== 1990s ===
Year	Film	No.	Song	Composer(s)	Writer(s)	Co-artist(s)	Note
1990	Maha-Sangram	151	"Do Dooni Chaar"	Anand–Milind	Sameer	Anuradha Paudwal	
1990	Maha-Sangram	152	"Aa Bahon Mein Aa"	Anand–Milind	Sameer	Anuradha Paudwal	
1990	Maha-Sangram	153	"Aaya Main Aaya"	Anand–Milind	Sameer	Udit Narayan	
1990	Aadmi aur Apsara	154	"Chamke Tu Chama Chama Chham Chham"	Ilaiyaraaja	Indeevar	Kavita Krishnamurthy	Hindi dubbed version
1990	Aadmi aur Apsara	155	"Tumne Is Tarah Maara Dekh Gaya Mai Zamarla Tumhara"	Ilaiyaraaja	Indeevar	Kavita Krishnamurthy	Hindi dubbed version
1990	Aadmi aur Apsara	156	"Balama Hai Tu Mere Dil Ka Mehma"	Ilaiyaraaja	Indeevar	Kavita Krishnamurthy	Hindi dubbed version
1990	Aadmi aur Apsara	157	"Sundar Dekho Lage Bada Shama"	Ilaiyaraaja	Indeevar	Kavita Krishnamurthy	Hindi dubbed version
1990	Aadmi aur Apsara	158	"Tanak Dhin Ta, Tanak Dhin Ta"	Ilaiyaraaja	Indeevar	Kavita Krishnamurthy	Hindi dubbed version
1990	Aadmi aur Apsara	159	"Pehle Bharat Me Korawo Pandawo Ka Raj Tha"	Ilaiyaraaja	Indeevar		Hindi dubbed version
1990	Police Public	160	"Main Jis Din Bhula Doon Tera Pyar"	Raamlaxman	Asad Bhopali	Lata Mangeshkar	
1990	Swarg	161	"Bambai Humko Jam Gayi"	Anand–Milind	Sameer		
1990	Swarg	162	"Filmon Ke Sare Hero Mere Aage Hain Zero"	Anand–Milind	Sameer	Nitin Mukesh	
1990	Swarg	163	"Tum Sajna Ke Ghar Jaogi, Hamen Yaad Bahut Aaogi, Is Ghar, Is Angna Mein"	Anand–Milind	Sameer	Mohammed Aziz, Anupama Deshpande	
1990	Awwal Number	164	"Yeh Hai Cricket, Yeh Hai Cricket"	Bappi Lahiri	Amit Khanna	Bappi Lahiri, Udit Narayan	
1990	Awwal Number	165	"Poochho Na Kaisa"	Bappi Lahiri	Amit Khanna	S. Janaki	
1990	Awwal Number	166	"Chum Chum Chum"	Bappi Lahiri	Amit Khanna		
1990	Ghayal	167	"Don't Say No"	Bappi Lahiri	Anjaan	S. Janaki	
1990	Chor Pe Mor	168	"Baj Uthe Ghungroo"	R. D. Burman	Gulshan Bawra	Asha Bhosle	
1990	Chor Pe Mor	169	"Aur Sunao Kya Haal"	R. D. Burman	Gulshan Bawra	Asha Bhosle	
1990	Chor Pe Mor	170	"Chor Chor"	R. D. Burman	Gulshan Bawra	Shailendra Singh	
1990	Chor Pe Mor	171	"Hum To Pyar Mein"	R. D. Burman	Gulshan Bawra		
1990	Anjali	172	"Majic Journey"	Ilaiyaraaja	Sameer		Hindi dubbed version
1990	Deewana Mujh Sa Nahin	173	"Hum Tum Se Mohabat"	Anand–Milind	Sameer	Sadhana Sargam	
1990	Mera Pati Sirf Mera Hai	174	"Aaiye Farmaiye"	Anand–Milind	Sameer		
1990	Mera Pati Sirf Mera Hai	175	"Aao Ji Aao"	Anand–Milind	Sameer		
1990	Aaj Ka Arjun	176	"Chali Aana Tu Pan Ki"	Bappi Lahiri	Anjaan	Alka Yagnik	
1990	Aaj Ka Arjun	177	"Na Ja Re"	Bappi Lahiri	Anjaan		
1990	Jawani Zindabad	178	"Calcutta Ho Ya Kashi"	Anand–Milind	Sameer	Suresh Wadkar	
1990	Jawani Zindabad	179	"Meri Jaan Jao Na"	Anand–Milind	Sameer	Sadhana Sargam	
1990	Jawani Zindabad	180	"Sun Sun Sun Mera Yaar"	Anand–Milind	Sameer	Kavita Krishnamurthy	
1990	Sailaab	181	"Mujhko Yeh Zindagi"	Bappi Lahiri	Javed Akhtar	Asha Bhosle	
1990	Sailaab	182	"Palkon Ke Tale Jo Sapne Pale"	Bappi Lahiri	Javed Akhtar	Kavita Krishnamurthy	
1990	Jamai Raja	183	"Pyar Hua Hai Mujhe Aur Tujhe"	Laxmikant–Pyarelal	Javed Akhtar	Kavita Krishnamurthy	
1990	Jamai Raja	184	"Hum Aur Tum"	Laxmikant–Pyarelal	Javed Akhtar	Alka Yagnik	
1990	Jamai Raja	185	"Aag Lag Rahi Hai"	Laxmikant–Pyarelal	Javed Akhtar	Alka Yagnik	
1990	Baaghi	186	"Kaisa Lagta Hai"	Anand–Milind	Sameer	Anuradha Paudwal	
1990	Baaghi	187	"Kaisa Lagta Hai" (Sad)	Anand–Milind	Sameer	Anuradha Paudwal	
1990	Baaghi	188	"Tapori"	Anand–Milind	Sameer	Anand Chitragupt	
1990	Baaghi	189	"Maang Teri Saja Doon Mein"	Anand–Milind	Sameer		
1990	Thanedaar	190	"Jab Se Hui Hai Shaadi"	Bappi Lahiri	Raj Sippy and Sameer		
1990	Thanedaar	191	"Jeena Hai To Hans Ke Jiyo" (Part 1)	Bappi Lahiri	Anjaan	Asha Bhosle	
1990	Thanedaar	192	"Jeena Hai To Hans Ke Jiyo" (Part 2)	Bappi Lahiri	Anjaan	Asha Bhosle and Reema Lahiri	
1990	Thanedaar	193	"Pehli Pehli Baar Aisa Thanedaar Aaya"	Bappi Lahiri	Indeevar	Alka Yagnik	
1991	Hum	194	"Sanam Mere Sanam"	Laxmikant–Pyarelal	Anand Bakshi	Alka Yagnik	
1991	100 Days	195	"Le Le Dil, De De Dil"	Raamlaxman	Dev Kohli	Lata Mangeshkar	
1991	100 Days	196	"Gabbar Singh Yeh"	Raamlaxman	Ravinder Rawal	Alka Yagnik	
1991	Vishnu-Devaa	197	"Mathe Pe Yun Lat Lehrayi, Khul Gayi Dil Ki Baat"	Rajesh Roshan	Anjaan	Sadhana Sargam	
1991	Afsana Pyar Ka	198	"Aashiq Deewana"	Bappi Lahiri	Anjaan, Sameer		
1991	Afsana Pyar Ka	199	"Tip Tip Tip Tip"	Bappi Lahiri	Anjaan, Sameer	Asha Bhosle	
1991	Afsana Pyar Ka	200	"Nazren Mili"	Bappi Lahiri	Anjaan, Sameer	Asha Bhosle	
1991	Pyar Hua Chori Chori	201	"Pyar Hua Chori Chori"	Laxmikant–Pyarelal	Anand Bakshi	Alka Yagnik	
1991	Pyar Hua Chori Chori	202	"Ja Re Ja O Besharam Chanda"	Laxmikant–Pyarelal	Anand Bakshi	Kavita Krishnamurthy	
1991	Pyar Hua Chori Chori	203	"Teri Khamoshi Zuban Ban Gayi"	Laxmikant–Pyarelal	Anand Bakshi		
1991	Narsimha	204	"Jao Tum Chahe Jahan"	Laxmikant–Pyarelal	Javed Akhtar	Alka Yagnik	
1991	Narsimha	205	"Yaad Karoge Wahan"	Laxmikant–Pyarelal	Javed Akhtar	Alka Yagnik	
1991	Indrajeet	206	"Ab To Humko"	R. D. Burman	Gulshan Bawra	Asha Bhosle	
1991	Indrajeet	207	"Main Khule Aam"	R. D. Burman	Gulshan Bawra	Asha Bhosle	
1991	Indrajeet	208	"Main Na Jhooth Boloon"	R. D. Burman	Gulshan Bawra	Asha Bhosle	
1991	Pratikar	209	"Chitthi Mujhe Likhna"	Bappi Lahiri	Anand Bakshi	Asha Bhosle	
1992	Yaad Rakhegi Duniya	211	"Tooti Khidki, Makdi Ka Jangla"	Anand–Milind	Sameer	Kavita Krishnamurthy	
1992	Yaad Rakhegi Duniya	212	"Gali Gali Mein Gana"	Anand–Milind	Sameer		
1992	Yaad Rakhegi Duniya	213	"Naina O Meri Naina"	Anand–Milind	Sameer		
1992	Vishwatma	214	"Dil Le Gayi Teri Bindiya"	Viju Shah	Anand Bakshi	Sapna Mukherjee, Mohammad Aziz & Udit Narayan	
1992	Vishwatma	215	"Toofan"	Viju Shah	Anand Bakshi	Sadhana Sargam, Alka Yagnik, Sapna Mukherjee & Boney	
1992	Suryavanshi	216	"Goodbye Namaste Salaam"	Anand–Milind	Kulwant Jani		
1992	Adharm	217	"Tuna Tuna Tuk Tuk Tuna"	Anand–Milind	Sameer	Arun Bakshi	
1992	Jhoothi Shaan	218	"Rimjhim Barse"	R. D. Burman	Yogesh Gaud	Asha Bhosle	
1992	Jhoothi Shaan	219	"Jo Aap Aaye Bahar Laye"	R. D. Burman	Yogesh Gaud	Asha Bhosle, Chandrani Mukherjee	
1992	Humlaa	220	"Dil Nahin Dena Re, Dil Nahin Lena"	Laxmikant–Pyarelal	Anand Bakshi	Alka Yagnik	
1992	Jaagruti	221	"Chal Naujawan Aage Chal"	Anand–Milind	Sameer		
1992	Aaj Ka Goonda Raaj	222	"It's A Challenge"	Anand–Milind	Sameer		
1992	Honeymoon	223	"Aadha Tera Dil"	Anand–Milind	Majrooh Sultanpuri	Anuradha Paudwal	
1992	Khel	224	"Soone Shaam Savere"	Rajesh Roshan	Javed Akhtar		
1992	Khel	225	"Na Hai Zameen Na Aasman"	Rajesh Roshan	Javed Akhtar	Sadhana Sargam	
1993	Kabhi Haan Kabhi Naa	226	"Deewana Dil Deewana"	Jatin–Lalit	Majrooh Sultanpuri	Udit Narayan	
1993	Kabhi Haan Kabhi Naa	227	"Sachi Yeh Kahani Hai"	Jatin–Lalit	Majrooh Sultanpuri	Alka Yagnik	
1993	Kabhi Haan Kabhi Naa	228	"Kyon Na Hum Milke Pyar"	Jatin–Lalit	Majrooh Sultanpuri	Udit Narayan & Vijayeta Pandit	
1993	Hasti	229	"Ladka Ladki Se Phansa"	Anand–Milind	Sameer	Sadhana Sargam	
1993	Parampara	230	"Adhi Raat Ko"	Shiv–Hari	Anand Bakshi	Lata Mangeshkar	
1993	Izzat Ki Roti	231	"Teri Meri Baat Chali To Aisi Chali"	Bappi Lahiri	Anjaan	Anuradha Paudwal	
1993	Izzat Ki Roti	232	"Chini Mini Chini Mini Meri Jaan"	Bappi Lahiri	Anjaan	Anuradha Paudwal	
1993	Gurudev	233	"Aana Re, Aana Re"	R. D. Burman	Majrooh Sultanpuri		
1993	Gurudev	234	"Ek Din Tera Dheere Se"	R. D. Burman	Majrooh Sultanpuri		
1993	Aulad Ke Dushman	235	"Main Aa Gaya Hoon"	Shyam–Surinder	Satish Sharma		
1993	Aasoo Bane Angaarey	236	"Deewane Yeh Ladke"	Rajesh Roshan	Indeevar, Dev Kohli, and Payam Sayeedi	Kavita Krishnamurthy	
1993	Prateeksha	237	"O Meri Maa"	Rajesh Roshan	Prayag Raj		
1994	Imtihaan	238	"Is Tarah Aashiqui Ka" (2)	Anu Malik	Faaiz Anwar		
1994	Dushman Duniya Ka	239	"Mere Naujawano Pyare Naujawano"	Anu Malik (originally by R. D. Burman)	Ravindra Jain		based on the song "Mere Bhole Balam" from the film Padosan sung by Kishore Kumar; tribute to Kishore Kumar
1994	Chauraha	240	"Yeh Kaisa Pyar Hai"	Laxmikant–Pyarelal	Anand Bakshi	Kavita Krishnamurthy	
1994	Krantiveer	241	"Love Rap"	Anand–Milind	Sameer	Sudesh Bhosle, Sapna Mukherjee, Poornima	
1994	Sangdil Sanam	242	"Aankhon Mein Bandh Kar Loon"	Anand–Milind	Sameer	Sadhana Sargam	
1994	Sangdil Sanam	243	"Aankhon Mein Band" (Sad)	Anand–Milind	Sameer		
1994	Sangdil Sanam	244	"One Two Three"	Anand–Milind	Sameer		
1995	Talaashi	245	"Pyar Karegi Na Re Baba Na" (Happy)	Anand–Milind	Sameer	Alka Yagnik	
1995	Talaashi	246	"Pyar Karegi Na Re Baba Na" (Sad)	Anand–Milind	Sameer	Alka Yagnik	
1995	Paandav	247	"Ye Haina Pyaar Hi To Haina"	Jatin–Lalit	Majrooh Sultanpuri	Sadhana Sargam	
1995	Paandav	248	"Ye Chaman Jo Jal Gaya"	Jatin–Lalit	Majrooh Sultanpuri	Udit Narayan	
1996	Sautela Bhai	249	"O Jiyo Jiyo Yaaro"	R.D.Burman	Majrooh Sultanpuri		
1996	Sapoot	250	"Kajal Kajal"	Anu Malik	Dev Kohli	Asha Bhosle	
1996	Sapoot	251	"Tukur Tukur"	Anu Malik	Dev Kohli	Asha Bhosle	
1997	Judaai	252	"Raat Ko Neend Aati Nahin"	Nadeem–Shravan	Sameer	Priya Bhattacharya	
1997	Sanam	253	"Maine Kal Ek Sapna Dekha"	Anand–Milind	Sameer	Vinod Rathod	
1997	Mahaanta	254	"Tere Bin Main Hu Kya"	Laxmikant–Pyarelal	Anand Bakshi		
1997	Mahaanta	255	"Mere Yaaron Tum"	Laxmikant–Pyarelal	Anand Bakshi	Mohammad Aziz, Kavita Krishnamurthy, Sadhana Sargam	
1998	Bade Miyan Chote Miyan	256	"Deta Jai Jo Re" (I)	Viju Shah	Sameer	Anuradha Paudwal, Kavita Krishnamurthy, Udit Narayan	
1998	Angaaray	257	"Aande Aande"	Aadesh Shrivastava	Javed Akhtar	Alka Yagnik, Udit Narayan, Aadesh Shrivastava	
1998	Qila	258	"Kurte Ki Banhiya"	Anand Raaj Anand	Dev Kohli	Udit Narayan, Preeti Uttam Singh	
1999	Silsila Hai Pyar Ka	259	"Suno Suno Ladkiyon"	Jatin–Lalit	Sameer		
1999	Kohram	260	"Hum Hain Banaras Ke Bhaiya"	Dillip Sen–Sameer Sen	Dev Kohli	Sudesh Bhosle	
1999	Anari No.1	261	"Bol Hari Bol Hari"	Dillip Sen–Sameer Sen	Dev Kohli	Pradeep Suri	

=== 2000s–present ===
Year	Film	No.	Song	Composer(s)	Writer(s)	Co-artist(s)	Note
2000	Raju Chacha	262	"Dil Dil Ka Yeh Kaam Hai"	Jatin–Lalit	Anand Bakshi	Gavin Bryars	
2000	Raju Chacha	263	"Kahin Se Aayi Rani"	Jatin–Lalit	Anand Bakshi		
2000	Beti No. 1	264	"Dil Ki Dhadkan"	Viju Shah	Maya Govind, Dev Kohli	Udit Narayan	
2000	Shikari	265	"Gora Pareshaan Hai"	Aadesh Shrivastava	Sameer	Poornima	
2000	Aaj Ka Nanha Farishta	266	"Yeh Duniya Gol Hai"	Rajesh Roshan	Anwar Sagar	Sapna Mukherjee	
2000	Jai Shakumbhari Maa	267	"Trahimam Trahimam"	Ravindra Jain		Juned Akhtar, Jojo, Dilraj Kaur, Suhasini, Suresh Wadkar, Sadhana Sargam, Kavita Krishnamurthy, Sonu Nigam, Ravindra Jain	
2000	Jai Shakumbhari Maa	268	"Utho Jago Chalo Re Bhakto"	Ravindra Jain		Juned Akhtar, Jojo, Dilraj Kaur, Suhasini, Suresh Wadkar, Sadhana Sargam, Kavita Krishnamurthy, Sonu Nigam, Ravindra Jain	
2000	Jai Shakumbhari Maa	269	"Aankhen Moondu To Wo Nazar"	Ravindra Jain		Juned Akhtar, Jojo, Dilraj Kaur, Suhasini, Suresh Wadkar, Sadhana Sargam, Kavita Krishnamurthy, Sonu Nigam, Ravindra Jain	
2000	Jai Shakumbhari Maa	270	"Jaago Re Bhakto"	Ravindra Jain		Juned Akhtar, Jojo, Dilraj Kaur, Suhasini, Suresh Wadkar, Sadhana Sargam, Kavita Krishnamurthy, Sonu Nigam, Ravindra Jain	
2000	Jai Shakumbhari Maa	271	"Bhakto Ke Sankat Mein"	Ravindra Jain		Juned Akhtar, Jojo, Dilraj Kaur, Suhasini, Suresh Wadkar, Sadhana Sargam, Kavita Krishnamurthy, Sonu Nigam, Ravindra Jain	
2000	Jai Shakumbhari Maa	272	"Jai Shakumbhari Maa"	Ravindra Jain		Juned Akhtar, Jojo, Dilraj Kaur, Suhasini, Suresh Wadkar, Sadhana Sargam, Kavita Krishnamurthy, Sonu Nigam, Ravindra Jain	
2000	Jai Shakumbhari Maa	273	"Meri Sunle Re Sunle"	Ravindra Jain		Juned Akhtar, Jojo, Dilraj Kaur, Suhasini, Suresh Wadkar, Sadhana Sargam, Kavita Krishnamurthy, Sonu Nigam, Ravindra Jain	
2001	Kabhi Khushi Kabhie Gham	274	"Bole Chudiyan"	Jatin–Lalit	Sameer	Kavita Krishnamurti, Alka Yagnik, Sonu Nigam, Udit Narayan	
2003	Jhankaar Beats	275	"Boss Kaun Tha"	Vishal-Shekhar	Vishal Dadlani		
2003	Jhankaar Beats	276	"Humein Tumse Pyaar Kitna"	Vishal-Shekhar	Vishal Dadlani	KK	
2003	Jhankaar Beats	277	"Ruk Ruk Rukna Na"	Vishal-Shekhar	Vishal Dadlani		
2004	Chot - Aj Isko, Kal Tereko	278	"Bhains Paani Mein"	Raju Singh	Sudhakar Sharma	Javed Khan, Richa Sharma and Chaila Bihari	
2006	Apna Sapna Money Money	279	"Dil Mein Baji Guitar - 1"	Pritam	Shabbir Ahmed	Babul Supriyo	
2006	Fight Club: Members Only	280	"Chhore Ki Baatein"	Pritam	Mayur Puri	Shweta Pandit	
2006	Fight Club: Members Only	281	"Chhore Ki Baatein" (Remix)	Pritam	Mayur Puri	Shweta Pandit	
2005	Page 3	282	"Filmy Very Filmy"	Shamir Tandon	Sandeep Nath	Blazze	
2007	Mumbai Salsa	283	"Pyar Se" (Male Version)	Adnan Sami	Sameer		
2007	Dhamaal	284	"Chandani Raat Hai Saiyan"	Adnan Sami	Sameer	Asha Bhosle	
2007	Dhamaal	285	"Miss India Martee Mujhpe"	Adnan Sami	Sameer	Adnan Sami	
2007	Victoria No. 203	286	"Do Bechare" (Remix)	Viju Shah	Verma Malik	Udit Narayan	
2008	My Name Is Anthony Gonsalves	287	"Jaane Maula Jaane Khuda"	Pritam, Himesh Reshammiya	Sameer		
2010	Dulha Mil Gaya	288	"Dilrubaon Ke Jalwe"	Lalit Pandit	Mudassar Aziz	Monali Thakur	
2010	Dulha Mil Gaya	289	"Dilrubaon Ke Jalwe" (Remix)	Lalit Pandit	Mudassar Aziz	Monali Thakur	
2012	Chaalis Chauraasi	290	"Setting Zaala"	Lalit Pandit	Sandeep Shrivastav	Sonu Nigam, Yashita Yashpal	
2013	Himmatwala	291	"Nainon Mein Sapna"	Bappi Lahiri	Indeevar	Shreya Ghoshal	
2014	P Se PM Tak	292	"Balle Balle"	Jatin Pandit	Vinoo Mahendra		
2015	Kaun Kitne Paani Mein	293	"Chala Murari"	Bishakh Jyoti - Kanish	Protiqe Mojoomdar		
2016	Aman Ke Farishtey	294	"Boom Mat Marna"	Bappi Lahiri	Sohan Lal Bhatia	Sarika Kapoor	
2026	Dhurandhar: The Revenge	295	"Rang De Lal (Oye Oye)"	Shashwat Sachdev, Kalyanji–Anandji	Jasmine Sandlas, Reble, Anand Bakshi	Jasmine Sandlas, Afsana Khan, Reble, Sapna Mukherjee	

== Regional songs ==
=== Marathi songs ===
Year	Film	No	Song	Composer(s)	Writer(s)	Co-artist(s)
1977	Banya Bapu	1	"Le Lo Bhai Chivada"	Rishi-Raj	Murlidhar Gode	Shailendra Singh
1988	Ashi Hi Banwa Banwi	2	"Banwa Banwi, Ashi Hi Banwa Banwi"	Arun Paudwal	Shantaram Nandgaonkar	Suresh Wadkar, Shailendra Singh, Sachin
1988	Saglikade Bombabomb	3	"Ja Ja Nako Maru Tu Gamja"	Arun Paudwal	Sudhir Moghe	Suresh Wadkar
1989	Thartharat	4	"Chikiri Buboom”	Anil Mohile	Pravin Davane	Usha Mangeshkar
2011	Bedhund	5	"Darya Kinare"	Jagdish Bhosle		
2013	Mai	6	"Dhakku Makum"	Nitin Shankar	Sahil Sultanpuri	Zanaya Bhosle

=== Malayalam songs ===
Year	Film	No	Song	Composer(s)	Writer(s)	Co-artist(s)	Note
2010	Kandahar	1	"Tigde Tigde"	Shamir Tandon	Sandeep Nath	Neetha Subhir	

=== Odia songs ===
Year	Film	No.	Song	Composer(s)	Writer(s)	Co-artist(s)
1976	Gapa Hele Bi Sata	1	"E Mora Dost Jibanaku Karidele"	Bhuban - Hari		
1977	Sandhya Tara	2	"Mote Jie Jaha Kahu Mora Ki Jae Tu Mora"	Basudeb Rath	Shibabrata Das	
1976	Gapa Hele Bi Sata		E Banara Chhai	Bhuban - Hari	Gurukrushna Goswami	Suman Kalyanpur

=== Bengali songs ===
Year	Film	No	Song	Composer(s)	Writer(s)	Co-artist(s)	Note	Ref.
1974	Sangini	1	"Nilima Priyotama - Jekhani Thaki Tomake Dekhi"	Sudhin Dasgupta	Pulak Bandyopadhyay	Sonali Gupta		
1974	Sangini	2	"Tomra Ke He"	Sudhin Dasgupta	Pulak Bandyopadhyay			
1976	Hansharaj	3	"Kolkata - Chitkar Chechamechi Mata Batha"	Sudhin Dasgupta	Pulak Bandyopadhyay			
1976	Dampati	4	"Daraw Daraw (Danrao Danrao)"	Bhupen Hazarika	Pulak Bandyopadhyay	Aarti Mukherjee		
1976	Ajasra Dhanyabad	5	"Kheye Noon Aada"	Shyamal Mitra	Gauriprasanna Mazumder	Prasun Bandyopadhyay and Shyamal Mitra		
1978	Parichay	6	"Char Chokher"	Sailesh Ray	Shibdas Bandyopadhyay			
1979	Shubho Sangbad	7	"Chowrongir Chowmathate"	Sudhin Dasgupta	Pulak Banerjee	Robin Ganguly	Soundtrack released in 1975, film released in 1979.	
1979	Shubho Sangbad	8	"Eureka"	Sudhin Dasgupta	Pulak Banerjee		Soundtrack released in 1975, film released in 1979.	
1982	Aparupa	9	"Pelam Tomay Eto Kachhe Aj"	R. D. Burman	Gauriprasanna Mazumder	Aarti Mukherjee		
1982	Prahari	10	"Ore Mon Ke Emon"	Sapan Jagmohan	Mukul Dutta	Mohammed Rafi, Bhupinder Singh, Aarti Mukherjee	Soundtrack released in 1979, film released in 1982.	
1983	Agamikal	11	"Eta Akash Tate Ektai Chand"	Laxmikant–Pyarelal	Gauriprasanna Mazumder	Chandrani Mukherjee		
1983	Duti Pata	12	"Keno Je Emon Holo"	Mirnal Banerjee	Gauriprasanna Mazumder			
1983	Duti Pata	13	"Jhar Jhar Jhare"	Mirnal Banerjee	Gauriprasanna Mazumder	Asha Bhosle		
1983	Duti Pata	14	"Aari Bhaab Aari Bhaab"	Mirnal Banerjee	Gauriprasanna Mazumder	Bitu Samajpati		
1983	Duti Pata	15	"Pahar Pahar Pahar"	Mirnal Banerjee	Gauriprasanna Mazumder	Mirnal Banerjee, Bitu Samajpati		
1983	Shrinkhal	16	"Sab Raateri Sheshe"	Rabin Banerjee	Miltu Ghosh			
1983	Shrinkhal	17	"Kalakallole Jage"	Rabin Banerjee	Miltu Ghosh			
1983	Shrinkhal	18	"Ajana Dwatiyer"	Rabin Banerjee	Miltu Ghosh	Rabi Ghosh, Mantu		
1983	Jay Parajay	19	"Tomar Amar Jibanbeena"	Rabin Banerjee	Chandan Mukherjee	Asha Bhosle		
1983	Jay Parajay	20	"Ei Duniyay Banchte Gele"	Rabin Banerjee	Chandan Mukherjee	Asha Bhosle		
1984	Parabat Priya	21	"Heerer Tukro Chhele"	Ajoy Das	Pulak Bandyopadhyay			
1984	Shatru	22	"Bal Bal Na Tupi Kake Parai"	Dillip–Dillip	Anjan Choudhury			
1985	Hulusthul	23	"Amar E Gaan"	Dillip–Dillip	Gauriprasanna Mazumder			
1985	Hulusthul	24	"Bhalobasha Jeno"	Dillip–Dillip	Gauriprasanna Mazumder			
1985	Hulusthul	25	"Tomar Praner"	Dillip–Dillip	Gauriprasanna Mazumder	Aarti Mukherjee		
1985	Sandhya Pradip	26	"Ekla Ekla Aar Bhalo Lage Na"	Mirnal Bandyopadhyay	Pulak Bandyopadhyay	Anuradha Paudwal		
1986	Anurager Chhowa	27	"Ja Peyechhi Ami Ta Chai Na"	Ajoy Das	Gauriprasanna Mazumder			
1986	Anurager Chhowa	28	"Gun Gun Kare Mon"	Ajoy Das	Gauriprasanna Mazumder	Asha Bhosle		
1986	Abhimaan	29	"Sajre Sepai Saj"	Ajoy Das	Pulak Bandyopadhyay			
1986	Amar Kantak	30	"Ei Dhinak Dhinak"	Ajoy Das	Gauriprasanna Mazumder			
1986	Artanad	31	"Ram Rahin John"	Rabin Banerjee	Rabin Banerjee and Chandan Mukherjee			
1986	Artanad	32	"Shurjer Moton Hobo Ujjal (Male Version)"	Rabin Banerjee	Rabin Banerjee and Chandan Mukherjee			
1986	Bouma	33	"Aaj Jai Kalke Abar"	Kanu Bhattacharya	Ranjit Dey	Asha Bhosle		
1986	Dui Adhyay	34	"O Byata Thater Thakur"	Soumitra Banerjee	Gauriprasanna Mazumder			
1986	Dui Adhyay	35	"E Raat Phire Aasbe Na"	Soumitra Banerjee	Gauriprasanna Mazumder	Indrani Ganguly		
1986	Dui Adhyay	36	"Boli Ogo Bamun Thakur"	Soumitra Banerjee	Hiren Bose	Indrani Ganguly		
1986	Parinati	37	"Mon Chute Jai"	Ajoy Das	Pulak Bandyopadhyay	Arundhati Holme Chowdhury		
1987	Gayak	38	"Jibaner Aanka Banka"	Rabin Banerjee	Shibdas Banerjee			
1987	Gayak	39	"Hey Akash Tumi Shono"	Rabin Banerjee	Shibdas Banerjee			
1987	Gayak	40	"Bhalobasar Swargo" (Tumi Ami Gopone)	Rabin Banerjee	Shibdas Banerjee			
1987	Gayak	41	"Jowar Ekhono Aase Nai Tai"	Rabin Banerjee	Shibdas Banerjee			
1987	Gayak	42	"Chayan Pare Nahi"	Rabin Banerjee	Shibdas Banerjee		A Hindi Song in a Bengali film	
1987	Jar Je Priya	43	"Biroher Topto Kholay"	Mirnal Banerjee	Bibhuti Mukherjee			
1987	Jar Je Priya	44	"Tomar Moto Premi Amar"	Mirnal Banerjee	Bibhuti Mukherjee	Chandrani Mukherjee		
1987	Mouna Mukhar	45	"Ek Ekke Ek"	Abhijit Banerjee	Shibdas Banerjee			
1987	Paap Punya	46	"Ki Katha Ekhon Boli"	Ajoy Das	Pulak Bandyopadhyay	Sreeradha Bandyopadhyay		
1988	Aaghat	47	"E Kemon Sukher Kanta"	Mirnal Banerjee	Deb Singha	Asha Bhosle		
1988	Aaghat	48	"Nacho Nacho Sudhu Nacho"	Mirnal Banerjee	Deb Singha	Usha Mangeshkar		
1988	Aaghat	49	"Ja Phire Ja Sukh Re Tui"	Mirnal Banerjee	Deb Singha			
1988	Channachara	50	"Amra Baire Channachara"	Mirnal Banerjee	Shibdas Banerjee and Tapash Dutta			
1988	Channachara	51	"Keno Bolte Paro"	Mirnal Banerjee	Shibdas Banerjee and Tapash Dutta	Shubhra Dutta		
1988	Dena Pawna	52	"Pithe Niye Rajar Kumar"	Ajoy Das	Pulak Bandyopadhyay			
1988	Kidnap	53	"Bou Jodi Hoy Surponokha Re"	Rabin Banerjee	Miltu Ghosh			
1988	Kidnap	54	"Ma Ki Karo Haray Sona" (Duet)	Rabin Banerjee	Miltu Ghosh	Arundhati Holme Chowdhury		
1988	Kidnap	55	"Ma Ki Karo Haray Sona" (Solo)	Rabin Banerjee	Miltu Ghosh			
1988	Maa Ek Mandir	56	"Bhule Gechi Hindu"	Ajoy Das	Shibdas Banerjee			
1988	Ora Charjon	57	"Ei Duniyay Bache Pran"	Arun Rabin	Jatileswar Mkhopadhyay or Pulak Banerjee	Krishna Das		
1988	Parashmoni	58	"Hey Ghora Tik Tik Tik"	Hemanta Mukherjee	Tarun Majumdar	Dayna Das		
1988	Punarmilan	59	"Kapad Chai Kapad"	Kanu Bhattacharya	Pulak Banerjee			
1988	Punarmilan	60	"Swapna Purir Ek Chotto Ghare"	Kanu Bhattacharya	Pulak Banerjee	Arundhati Holme Chowdhury		
1988	Tumi Kato Sundar	61	"Swapaner Mallika"	Mrinal Banerjee	Pulak Banerjee	Anupama Deshpande		
1988	Tumi Kato Sundar	62	"Pran Nache Ei Mon Nache"	Mrinal Banerjee	Pulak Banerjee	Usha Mangeshkar		
1989	Amar Shapath	63	"Ei Sagorer Dheu Jodi"	Kanu Bhattacharya	Shankar Ghosh	Asha Bhosle		
1989	Amar Tumi	64	"Bhalo Bashi Bhalo Bashi"	Bappi Lahiri	Pulak Banerjee	Kavita Krishnamurthy		
1989	Agni Trishna	65	"Aaj Ke Shiber Chaturdashi	Bappi Lahiri	Bhabesh Kundu	Alka Yagnik		
1989	Aakrosh	66	"Baje Dhol Takdhina Dhin"	R.D. Burman	Pulak Banerjee	Asha Bhosle		
1989	Amanat	67	"Atom Boma Phatey Ni"	Amit Kumar	Sapan Chakraborty			
1989	Amanat	68	"Tumi Amar Aami Tomar"	Amit Kumar	Sapan Chakraborty	Asha Bhosle		
1989	Amar Prem	69	"Amar Amar Ar Bhebo Na"	Bappi Lahiri	Pulak Banerjee	Chandrani Mukherjee		
1989	Angar	70	"Tomar Moner Kache" (Duet Version)	Mrinal Banerjee	Tapash Dutta	Shubra Dutta		
1989	Angar	71	"Tomar Moner Kache" (Solo Version, Version 1)	Mrinal Banerjee	Tapash Dutta			
1989	Bandini	72	"Sutapa I Love You"	Kanu Bhattacharya	Pulak Banerjee	Asha Bhosle		
1989	Bandini	73	"Ei Kache Aasbey"	Kanu Bhattacharya	Pulak Banerjee	Asha Bhosle		
1989	Bandini	74	"Bah Ki Sundar Abhinoy"	Kanu Bhattacharya	Pulak Banerjee			
1989	Jhankar	75	"Ei Elakay Bas Kori Ma"	R.D. Burman	Sapan Chakraborty	Anuradha Paudwal		
1989	Jhankar	76	"Shono Shono Gunijan"	R.D. Burman	Sapan Chakraborty			
1989	Judge Saheb (Jaj Saheb)	77	"Aami Eka Boro Eka"	Ajoy Das	Pulak Banerjee			
1989	Judge Saheb (Jaj Saheb)	78	"Manjhe Manjhe Sona Rodh"	Ajoy Das	Pulak Banerjee			
1989	Judge Saheb (Jaj Saheb)	79	"Mon Jodi Chaye"	Ajoy Das	Pulak Banerjee	Asha Bhosle		
1989	Mastan	80	"Jiboner Juaa Khela"	Anu Malik	Mukul Dutt		Bengali dubbed version	
1989	Mastan	81	"Ramer Bhai Lokhon"	Anu Malik	Mukul Dutt	Suresh Wadkar	Bengali dubbed version	
1989	Mastan	82	"Chupi Chupi Kono Chor"	Anu Malik	Mukul Dutt	Sadhana Sargam	Bengali dubbed version	
1989	Mastan	83	"Halka Halka Daag Daag"	Anu Malik	Mukul Dutt	Suresh Wadkar, Sadhana Sargam	Bengali dubbed version	
1989	Mone Mone	84	"Mon Niye Jete Jete"	Kanu Bhattacharya	Pulak Banerjee			
1989	Monimala	85	"Amar Jiboner Judhey"	Sapan-Jagmohan	Mukul Dutt			
1989	Nayanmoni	86	"Sundari Je Uthlo"	Bappi Lahiri	Pulak Banerjee			
1989	Pronomi Tomay	87	"Chand Utheche Phul Futeche"	Bappi Lahiri	Pulak Banerjee			
1989	Sansar	88	"Heley To Aachi Ar Koto Helbo"	Bappi Lahiri	Mukul Dutta	Usha Mangeshkar		
1989	Sansar	89	"Jibon Madhab Moron Madhab"	Bappi Lahiri	Mukul Dutta	Debu Mukherjee, Swapna Mukherjee		
1989	Sansar	90	"Tomar Janma Din Asuk"	Bappi Lahiri	Mukul Dutta	Shailendra Singh, Chandrani Mukherjee		
1990	Mandira	88	"Dhin Dhina Dhin Tak Dhina"	Bappi Lahiri	Pulak Bandyopadhyay	Shabbir Kumar		
1990	Mandira	89	"Tomay Chere Ami	Bappi Lahiri	Pulak Bandyopadhyay	Alka Yagnik		
1990	Apan Amar Apan	90	"Andhare Kakhan Eshe"	R. D. Burman	Gauriprasanna Mazumder			
1990	Apan Amar Apan	91	"Emono Prahar Ashe"	R. D. Burman	Gauriprasanna Mazumder			
1990	Andha Bichar	92	"Ae Jhil Mil Jhil Mil"	R. D. Burman	Swapan Chakraborty	Asha Bhosle		
1990	Andha Bichar	93	"Buli Na Maa Dure Theke"	R. D. Burman	Swapan Chakraborty			
1990	Andha Bichar	94	"Amar Jibone Tumi Ele"	R. D. Burman	Swapan Chakraborty	Sadhana Sargam		
1990	Andha Bichar	95	"Jodi Pawa Jaye"	R. D. Burman	Swapan Chakraborty	Asha Bhosle		
1990	Andha Bichar	96	"Aashun Aashun Kheye Dekhun"	R. D. Burman	Swapan Chakraborty			
1990	Andha Bichar	97	"Tui Jodi Go Mohamaya"	R. D. Burman	Swapan Chakraborty			
1990	Badnam	98	"Priya Priya Tumi Je Amar Priya"	Bappi Lahiri	Pulak Bandopadhyay	Alka Yagnik		
1990	Raktareen	99	"Jadi Maler M L A Hote"	Bappi Lahiri	Pulak Bandopadhyay	Usha Mangeshkar, Sapna Mukherjee		
1991	Bourani	100	"Kende Kende Bole Nari"	R. D. Burman	Bhavesh Kundu	Kavita Krishnamurthy		
1991	Rin Shodh	101	"Bhije Gechhi Jete Jete"	Rajesh Roshan	Mukul Dutt	Sadhana Sargam		
1991	Rin Shodh	102	"Haate Chhuyeche"	Rajesh Roshan	Mukul Dutt	Sapna Mukherjee		
1991	Rin Shodh	103	"Doctor Der Julus Alo"	Rajesh Roshan	Mukul Dutt	Jolly Mukherjee, Sadhana Sargam		
1992	Mayabini	104	"Aaj Madhu Sondhay"	Tanmoy Chatterjee				
1995	Sangharsha	105	"Dudher Badshah"	Bappi Lahiri	Anjan Choudhury	Bappi Lahiri		
1995	Sangharsha	106	"Tol Re Tol"	Bappi Lahiri	Anjan Choudhury			
1996	Tomake Chai	107	"Tumi Amay Korte Sukhi Jibone"	Ahmed Imtiaz Bulbul		Anuradha Paudwal		
1999	Sobar Ajante	108	"Tumi Chhile, Achho Toh"	Emon Saha	Moniruzzaman Monir	Shriram		
1999	Sobar Ajante	109	"Tomar Dorbar Theke"	Emon Saha	Moniruzzaman Monir			
2005	Porinam	110	"Du Diner Eai Jibontate"	Babul Bose	Gautam Sushmit			
2005	Raju Uncle	111	"Bhut Kimbhoot Mar Mar Janta"	Ashok Raj	Gautam Sushmit			
2005	Swapno	112	"Bidhi Re Ei Kheya"	Shyamal Mitra, Madhu Mukherjee	Gauriprasanna Mazumder			
2006	MLA Fatakeshto	113	"Bibi Asol Hero"	Jeet Gannguli	Gautam Sushmit			
2006	MLA Fatakeshto	114	"Ami MLA Fatakeshto	Jeet Gannguli	Gautam Sushmit			
2006	MLA Fatakeshto	115	"Khusir Aalo"	Jeet Gannguli	Gautam Sushmit	Pamela Jain		
2006	Refugee	116	"E Keora"	Jeet Gannguli	Gautam Sushmit	Pamela Jain		
2006	Ghatak	117	"Aaj Tora Sesh Dinete"	Jeet Gannguli	Gautam Sushmit			
2007	Nabab Nandini	118	"Aami Aachi Sneha Mamata"	Jeet Gannguli	Gautam Sushmit			
2009	Olot Palot	119	"Jhinkur Kur"	Rocket Mondal				
2013	Ashchorjyo Prodeep	120	"Charidik Bodle Gechhe The Car Song"	Raja Narayan Deb	Anik Dutta			
2022	Kacher Manush	121	"Are Are Bondhu"	Nilayan Chatterjee		Shaan		
2024	Shontaan	122	"Thakur Thakbe Kotokkhon"	Jeet Gannguli	Priyo Chattopadhyay			

== Non-film songs ==
Year	Title	Song	Composer(s)	Writer(s)	Co-artist(s)	Note	Ref.
2017–present	Guru Aur Bhole	Various tracks	Amit Kumar, Ravindra Shinde	Sameer, I. P. Singh, Vayu Shrivastav, Amit Senchoudhoury, Timir Bakshi	Various	Animated series	

== See also ==
- List of songs recorded by Kishore Kumar
- List of songs recorded by Udit Narayan
- Bollywood selected discography of Udit Narayan
- Abhijeet Bhattacharya Discography
- Sonu Nigam discography
- List of songs recorded by Alka Yagnik
- List of songs recorded by Mohammed Rafi (T)
- List of songs recorded by Anuradha Paudwal
