= Gapa Hele Bi Sata =

Gapa Hele Bi Sata may refer to:

- Gapa Hele Bi Sata (1976 film), an Odia-language film
- Gapa Hele Bi Sata (2015 film), an Indian Odia-language drama film
