= Shabhash Daddy =

1979 Indian Bollywood film

Shabbash Daddy
- Directed by: Kishore Kumar
- Written by: Kishore Kumar
- Produced by: Kishore Kumar
- Starring: Kishore Kumar; Yogeeta Bali; Amit Kumar; Jaya Sudha
- Music by: Kishore Kumar
- Release date: 1979
- Country: India
- Language: Hindi

Shabbash Daddy is a 1979 Bollywood film directed, produced, written & starred by Kishore Kumar, also stars Yogeeta Bali, Amit Kumar, and Jaya Sudha in lead roles. The film was one of several collaborations between Kishore Kumar and his real-life son Amit, where the two played a father and son. The film did not get notice.

== Cast ==
- Kishore Kumar as Col. Chhaju Singh
- Yogeeta Bali as Kamali
- Amit Kumar as Chandar Singh
- Jaya Sudha as Pinki
- Madan Puri as Brig. Vishwambhar Nath
- Mehmood as Dagdu Bajrang
- Jayshree T.
- Maruti as Yennababu Rangachari

== Soundtrack ==
The music of the film was composed by Kishore Kumar, while lyrics were written by Kishore Kumar, Irshad and Gulshan Bawra.

1. "O Meri Jaan" - Kishore Kumar, Asha Bhosle
2. "Pyar Aur Shadi" - Kishore Kumar, Amit Kumar
3. "Maine Jo Dil Diya" - Kishore Kumar, Yogeeta Bali
4. "Daur-e Khizan Se" - Amit Kumar

== Production ==
According to Rohit Mahajan from The Tribune, Kishore Kumar directed this film partly to launch his son in the movie industry.

== Reception ==
Diptakirti Chaudhuri described the film as "zanily named, crazily plotted". Derek Bose described Kishore Kumar as "rather restrained as a retired army officer, Col Chhaju Singh who flips over a beautiful fisherwoman, even as he has a young eligible son at home".
