= Pujoy Asha =

2018 album by Asha Bhosle and Amit Kumar

Compilation album by Asha Bhosle and Amit Kumar
- Released: October 8, 2018
- Recorded: September 2018
- Venue: Naktala Udayan Sangha, Kolkata, West Bengal
- Genres: Devotional; Pujor gaan
- Length: 8:18
- Language: Bengali
- Label: Asha Audio
- Director: Mahua Lahiri
- Producer: Asha Audio

Pujoy Asha is a Bengali-language compilation album by Indian playback singers Asha Bhosle and Amit Kumar. There are two singles in the album, namely "Ebar Pujoy Elaam Phire" and "Surey Tumi". The album was announced on October 3 and released on October 8, 2018, with the two tracks. The first single was sung by Asha Bhosle and the second by Amit Kumar.

Asha Bhosle previously sung her first Puja song in 1963 which was written by Pulak Bandyopadhyay, and in 1968 she worked with R. D. Burman to release more songs dedicated for Pujas, which were written by Gauriprasanna Mazumdar. She recorded the song in September following her 85th birthday besides appearing in the music video accompanying the album. Amit Kumar sang his Puja song after a 14-year gap.

The songs were composed by Shiladitya Chaudhury and Raj Roy, who convinced Bhosle to sing for the 2018 Durga Puja. The lyricists were Utpal Das and Sreeraj Mitra. It was produced by Asha Audio and presented at the Naktala Udayan Sangha.

== Background and recording ==
Asha Bhosle first sang a song dedicated for Durga Puja in 1963 which was titled "Amar Khatar Patay", composed by Manna Dey and written by Pulak Bandyopadhyay. In 1968, she released more Puja songs such as "Eyi Edike Esho" and "Jabo Ki Jabona" written by Gauriprasanna Mazumdar and composed by R. D. Burman, who became the later husband of Bhosle. The first song of the album, "Ebar Pujoy Elaam Phire" was recorded by Asha Bhosle a week after she completed her 85th birthday (recorded on September 15, 2018). A music video was shot for this single in which she appeared.

With its release in 2018, Bhosle's release of the album ended the gap of 23 years in which she did not sing any Pujor gaan following the death of her husband R. D. Burman in 1994. Shiladitya Chaudhury, of the duo Shiladitya – Raj remarked that it took him time to convince her to sing for Durga Puja after Burman's (Panchamda's) death. He also stated that when Bhosle was recording the songs, she recalled the days she spent with Burman. She expressed happiness that people were eager to hear songs for the Durga Pujas after a long time. Ray Roy composed the songs along with Chaudhury.

The two singles of the album were composed by the duo Shiladitya – Raj (Raj Roy), who said that they were looking forward to composing songs for a big artist for 25 years. They marked their dream to be realized when Asha Bhosle, who they stated as an avatar of Goddess Saraswati, recorded the two songs they had composed for the Pujoy Asha album. The duo were happy to work another time with singer Amit Kumar, who sang the second single "Surey Tumi". The duo music composers Shiladitya – Raj credited both the songs they composed to be tributes to the music maestros Kishore Kumar and R. D. Burman.

The album was scheduled for release on October 8, 2026, following the announcement of its release on October 3. The song "Ebar Pujoy Elaam Phire" was sung by Bhosle, written by Utpal Das and the song "Surey Tumi" was sung by Kumar, written by Sreeraj Mitra which Kumar sang as a Puja song after 14 years. The music arrangements of the songs was done by Som Chakraborty and the music video was shot by Chandan Singh. Pujoy Asha was produced and labeled by Asha Audio and presented at the venue Naktala Udayan Sangha, located in Kolkata, West Bengal. The director was Mahua Lahiri of Asha Audio, who commented on it.

== Track listing ==
All music is composed by Shiladitya Chaudhury and Raj Roy.

No.	Title	Lyrics	Artist	Length
1.	"Ebar Pujoy Elaam Phire" (Pujoy Asha)	Utpal Das	Asha Bhosle	4:06
2.	"Shurey Tumi"	Sreeraj Mitra	Amit Kumar	4:12
Total length:				8:18
