= Amit Kumar =

Indian singer (born 1952)

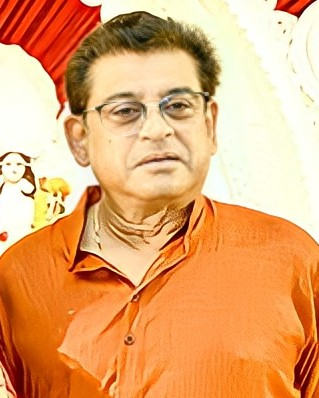
- Amit Kumar in 2021
- Born: Amit Kumar Ganguly; 3 July 1952 (age 74); Calcutta, West Bengal, India
- Occupations: Singer; actor; music director; record producer; director; writer
- Years active: 1973–present
- Works: Songs
- Spouse: Reema Ganguly
- Children: 2
- Parents: Kishore Kumar (father); Ruma Guha Thakurta (mother)
- Relatives: Madhubala,Yogeeta Bali, Leena Chandavarkar (stepmothers) Kajol (niece)
- Family: See Ganguly family
- Musical career
- Genre: Kishore Melody
- Instrument: Vocals

Amit Kumar (born 3 July 1952) is an Indian playback singer, music composer and actor. Kumar launched his own music production company, named Kumar Brothers Music. He has predominantly worked in Bollywood and regional film songs since the 1970s, including 150 Hindi and Bengali compositions by R. D. Burman and Bappi Lahiri. After Burman's death in 1994, citing a lack of quality music composition, Kumar withdrew from playback singing and concentrated on live orchestra shows. In addition to singing in Hindi, has also performed in Bengali, Bhojpuri, Odia, Assamese, Marathi and Konkani. He is the eldest son of singer-actor Kishore Kumar.

== Early life ==
Kumar is the son of singer and actor Kishore Kumar and Bengali singer and actress Ruma Guha Thakurta. Like his father, Amit started singing from an early age and he used to sing at Durga Pooja festivals in Calcutta. At one such function arranged by Bengali actor "Mahanayak" Uttam Kumar, the audience continued requesting encores. While his mother complained that he was singing "filmy" songs, his father decided to bring him to Bombay.

Kishore Kumar had cast Amit as his son in two films that he produced. In the first, Door Gagan Ki Chhaon Mein he sang Aa Chalke Tujhe, Mein Leke Chaloon to his eleven-year-old son. For the second film, Door Ka Raahi, a teenage Amit Kumar sang "Main Ik Panchi Matwaala Re", but it was removed from the final cut of the film.

== Singing career ==
=== 1970s ===
Kumar sang professionally for the first time, outside his father's composition, at the age of 21 in 1973. The song was "Hosh Mein Hum Kahan", composed by Sapan Jagmohan for the film Darwaza, which was released in 1978.

His duet with his father "Nazar Lage Na Saathiyo" from Des Pardes in 1978 became popular. In the 1976 film Balika Badhu, he sang "Bade Achchhe Lagte Hain" by the composer R.D. Burman, by which he attained national fame. This song was named the 26th most-popular film song of 1977 by the radio show Binaca Geetmala. Kumar recorded 170 Hindi songs under R.D. Burman.

In 1978, he sang "Aati Rahengi Baharein" in Kasme Vaade, for Randhir Kapoor's character. He also did playback singing for Randhir Kapoor in Chor Ke Ghar Chor (1978) and Dhongee.

He sang in various films, including Aandhi, Aap Ke Deewane, Khatta Meetha, Gol Maal, Des Pardes, Ganga Ki Saugandh, Deewanagi (1976), Duniya Meri Jeb Mein, Parvarish, Humare Tumhare (1979) and Baton Baton Mein. The duets he sang with Lata Mangeshkar and Asha Bhosle began his public display.

=== 1980s ===
Kumar's duet "Ka Janu Main Sajaniya" with Lata Mangeshkar and "Ram Kare Allah Kare" and "Humto Aap Ke Deewane Hai" with Mohd Rafi Saab. Then Amit sang all the songs for the 1981 film Love Story and won a Filmfare Award for the duet "Yaad Aa Rahi Hai" with Mangeshkar. Composer R.D. Burman jokingly told Amit before its release that this song sounds like a bhajan.

After the success of Love Story, Rajesh Khanna employed Kumar for playback singing in Fiffty Fiffty (1981) and then later in Aakhir Kyon? (1985), Ghar Ka Chirag, Jai Shiv Shankar, Swarg (1990) and Sautela Bhai (1996).

In 1980, Kumar sang "Laila o Laila" for Qurbani. Kumar's singing in "Aao Naye Sapne Bune", composed by Basudev for Main Qatil Hun (1984). The Asha–Kumar duet "Yun Toh Haseen Hazar" from Shradhanjali in 1981 became a hit. He had several "chart-busters" in 1982 and 1983, and "hits" with the duets "Tu Rootha Toh Main Ro Doongi Sanam", "Gali Gali Dhoonda Tujhe" and solo songs "Halla Gulla Maza Hai" and "Mana Abhi Tu Kamsin" from the film Jawani (1984). In 1985, the duet "Dushman Na Kare" from Akhir Kyun was popular. In 1986, the song "Mary Tu Hoja Meri" from Anokha Rishta and the duet "Roz Roz Ankhon" from Jeeva were popular. He had solo and duet songs in hit films such as Hum Paanch, Bulundi, Itni Si Baat, Hamari Bahu Alka, Anokha Bandhan, Ustaadi Ustad Se, Bheegi Palkein, Khatron Ke Khiladi, Maalamaal, Ilzaam, Anokha Rishta, Rama O Rama, Jaaydaad, Tridev, ChaalBaaz, Aag Se Khelenge, and Dost.

Kumar sang for almost all music directors and actors in the 1980s, and was the second-most preferred male playback singer in Hindi films, after his father Kishore Kumar. Among music directors, Amit Kumar was used more by Pancham from 1975 to 1994 and by Bappi Lahiri from 1983 to 1995. He became the voice of Kumar Gaurav in the 1980s and their combination gave many hit songs from films such as Romance (1983), Teri Kasam, Lovers (1983), All-rounder and Telefilm-Janam. He was also the voice for newcomer Karan Shah in films such as Jawani, Anokha Rishta, Apne Apne and Chor Pe Mor and though the songs were popular, only Anokha Rishta and Chor Pe Mor were successful films. In the late 1980s, Kumar sang songs for Anil Kapoor in films including Tezaab, Yudh and Aag Se Khelenge and continued to sing for him in the 1990s. The duets with Asha – "Pehle Pehle Pyar Ki" and "Yeh Tujhe Kya Hua" both from Ilzaam in 1986 and "Tere Naina Mere Naina" from Aag Se Khelenge and "Chotasa Parivaar Hamara" from Dost in 1989 became known in their respective years. The Anuradha Pudwal-Amit Kumar duet "Kehdo Ke Tum Meri" and solo song "Ek Do Teen" from Tezaab were part of Binaca Geet Mala's annual list in 1988. The song "Oye Oye- Tirchi Topi Waaley" from Tridev was a nationwide hit. Kumar did playback for Naseeruddin Shah in the film Hero Hiralal, which was popular as well. His duet "Yeh Kismat Hai Kya Kisne Dekha Yahan" with Alka Yagnik from Ghar Ka Chirag became popular in 1989. Soon after his father's death, Kumar and his half-brother Sumit Kumar released the album Dui Kishore as a tribute to Kishore Kumar.

=== 1990s to present ===
In 1990, the song "Sanam Mere Sanam" of Hum with Alka Yagnik is popular. Baaghi: A Rebel for Love had a smash hit in the song "Kaisa Lagta Hai". From the film Ghayal, the song "Pyaar tum mujhase" was popular. In this decade, Kumar had notable songs in films such as Sailaab, Police Public, Aaj Ka Arjun, 100 Days, Awwal Number, ChaalBaaz, Khel, Vishwatma, Honeymoon, Aaj Ka Goonda Raaj, Gurudev, Bade Miyan Chote Miyan and Judaai and also had hit songs in the films which flopped at the box office, such as Jawani Zindabad, Afsana Pyar Ka, Indrajeet, Sangdil Sanam, Jaagruti, Deewana Mujhsa Nahin and Suryavanshi.

Kumar enjoyed a special work relationship, in addition to R.D. Burman and Bappi Lahiri, with the music duo Anand–Milind, who heavily promoted Kumar in the early 1990s. Their collaborations include Baaghi: A Rebel for Love, Mera Pati Sirf Mera Hain, Maha-Sangram, Swarg, Anjaane Rishtey, Talaashi, Sangdil Sanam, Yaad Rakhegi Duniya, Woh Phir Aayegi, Aaj Ka Goonda Raaj, Sanam, Adharm, and Rakhwala. Anand–Milind were one of the few new-age music composers of that period who regularly recorded with Kumar. Kumar's duets "Nazrein Milin" and "Tip Tip Baarish" with Asha Bhosle in Afsana Pyar Ka were hit songs. His duets such as "Palkon Ke Tale" and "Mujhko Yeh Zindagi Lagti Hai" in Sailaab were hits too. Kumar gained the reputation of being a singer who belted out hit songs irrespective of the film being a commercial success or critically panned. Kumar also worked with Ram Laxman and songs such as the Lata-Amit Kumar duets "Main Jis Din Bhoola Doon" from Police Public in 1990 and "Le Le Dil" from 100 days in 1991 became popular. In 1990, Asha-Amit duets such as "Aur Suno Kya Haal" and "Baj Uthe Gunghroo" from Chor Pe Mor and Asha-Amit duets such as "Main Khule Aam Khedun" and "Main Na Jhoot" from Indrajeet in 1991 became popular. In 1992, the Lata-Amit Kumar duet "Adhi Raat Ko" from Parampara, composed by Shiv-Hari and Asha-Amit duets such as "Rimjhim Rimjhim Barse" and "Jo Aap Aye" from Jhooti Shaan were huge hits. Amit delivered more even in 1993, with Kabhi Haan Kabhi Naa. The songs "Deewana Dil Deewana" and "Sachhi Yeh Kahani Hai" were written.

Kumar also collaborated with another fresh talent from the 1990s, Jatin–Lalit, who had Amit Kumar croon numbers in several films such as Paandav (1995), Silsila Hai Pyar Ka, Kabhi Haan Kabhi Naa and Kabhi Khushi Kabhie Gham. He even worked with Ilaiyaraaja for the song "Yeh Gulabi Shaam Ka Nasha", a duet with Asha from the film Mera Farz (1988). In 1996, his duet with Asha Bhosle in the film Sapoot – "Kajal Kajal Teri Ankhon Ka", composed by Anu Malik became popular.

Later in the decade, Kumar declined most singing offers citing that the quality of music was deteriorating since the 1990s and after the death of R.D. Burman in 1994, with whom Amit had a special bond, he withdrew himself from the film industry. Kumar started undertaking more live stage performances in various parts of the world since 1996.

During these years, he also composed and released music albums, including:

- MAD
- Pyaar Toh Bas Pyaar Hai
- Dam Dama Dam
- Oh sweetheart
- Surer raja
- Sagarika
- Jaanam
- Forever Blue
- Baba Mere

Kumar sang songs for Raju Chacha, Apna Sapna Money Money (2006), Kandahar (2010), Dulha Mil Gaya, Himmatwala (2013). In 2018, he and Asha Bhosle released the album Pujoy Asha, in which Kumar sang the song "Surey Tumi".

== Television career ==
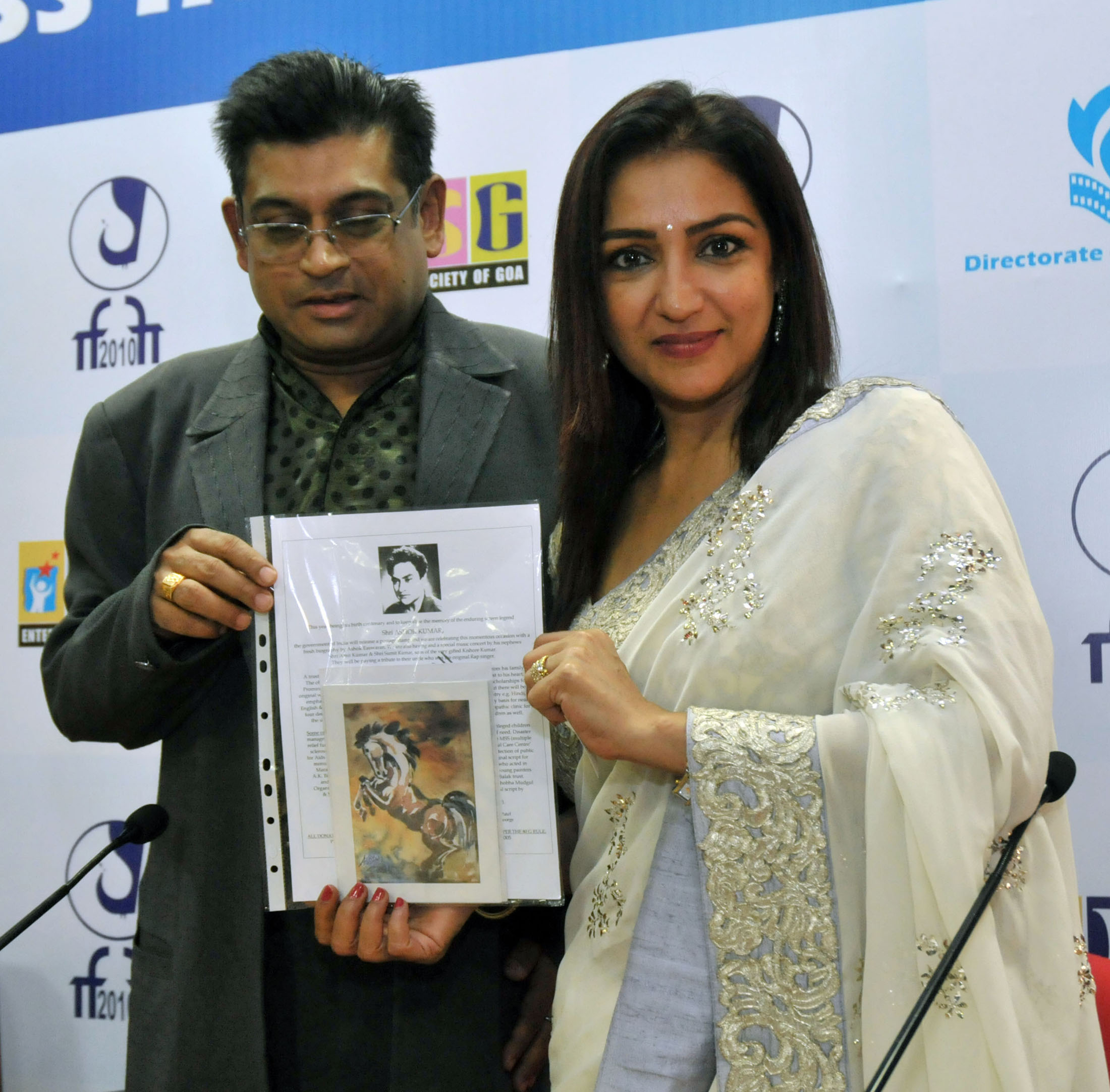
Kumar with Anuradha Patel, showing a painting by Ashok Kumar, at the IFFI-2010 in Panjim, Goa, 23 November.

In the late 1980s, Kumar performed voice work on Doordarshan TV serials such as Chunauti and Campus. He also did songs for the television film Janam, and sang the title tracks for the Hindi-dubbed version of Disney's animated series Duck Tales and Bob the Builder.

Kumar was one of the judges in the singing reality show K for Kishore, where singers tried to recreate the atmosphere of his father's songs. He was the main judge of the Zee Bangla singing competition Sa Re Ga Ma Pa. He provided the voice of character Guru in animated series Guru Aur Bhole which aired on Sony Yay. The character was inspired from Kishore Kumar's character from the film Padosan.

== Acting career ==
Amit Kumar acted in several films directed by and starring his father, which were Door Gagan Ki Chhaon Mein (1964), Door Ka Raahi (1971), Badhti Ka Naam Dadhi (1974), Shabhash Daddy (1979) and Chalti Ka Naam Zindagi (1982). In 1989, he made his last film appearance in his father's incomplete film Mamta Ki Chhaon Mein, which starred himself, his stepmother Leena Chandavarkar and Rajesh Khanna. After his father's death in 1987, he took over as director and completed the film for release in 1989. In his long career in film he acted in a Bengali film namely "Gayak". In this film the name of his character was Amit and it was of a struggling singer. He sang a number of songs for this film under the direction of Rabin Banerjee. This was the only Bengali film in his career where he acted and sang as a playback singer, for his own reel life for that same film. Besides he had a great role of playback singer in Bengali film industry and in this field he is really successful for over a few decades.

== Filmography ==
=== Film ===
Year	Film	Role	Notes
1964	Door Gagan Ki Chhaon Mein	Ramu	As child artist
1971	Door Ka Raahi	Jeetu	
1974	Badhti Ka Naam Dadhi	Fakkad 'Jhango'	
1979	Shabhash Daddy	Chandar Singh	
1982	Chalti Ka Naam Zindagi	Amit/Johnny	
1987	Gayak	Amit	Bengali film
1989	Mamta Ki Chhaon Mein	Niranjan	as co-director

=== Television ===
Year	Title	Role	Note	Ref.
2007–2008	K for Kishore	Judge	Singing reality show	
2010	Sa Re Ga Ma Pa Bangla	Judge	Season 10, Singing reality show	
2017–present	Guru Aur Bhole	Guru	Voice role; animated series	

== Awards and nominations ==
=== Filmfare Award for Best Male Playback Singer ===
Year	Song	Film	Music Director	Lyricist	Result
1981	"Yaad Aa Rahi Hai"	Love Story	R.D. Burman	Anand Bakshi	Won
1982	"Yeh Zameen Gaa Rahi Hai"	Teri Kasam	R.D. Burman	Anand Bakshi	Nominated
1988	"Ek Do Teen"	Tezaab	Laxmikant–Pyarelal	Javed Akhtar	Nominated
1989	"Tirchhi Topiwale"	Tridev	Viju Shah	Anand Bakshi	Nominated
1990	"Kaisa Lagta Hai"	Baaghi	Anand–Milind	Sameer	Nominated
