= Parinam (1961 film) =

- Directed by: Biswanath Nayak
- Produced by: Krushna Chandra Tripathy Sharma
- Starring: Geetisudha, Kartik Ghosh and Pramod Panigrahi
- Music by: Akshaya Mohanty
- Release date: 1961
- Country: India
- Language: Odia

Parinam (1961) is an Ollywood / Odia film directed by Biswanath Nayak.

== Cast ==
- Pramod Panigrahi
- Geetisudha
- Kartik Ghosh
- Sarat Pujari

== Soundtrack ==
1. "Chhaya Pachhe Pachhe Ghuri Bule"
