= Sudharani Jena =

Indian actress (1941–2023)

- Born: 6 February 1942
- Died: 22 August 2023 (aged 81)
- Occupation: Actress (Odia)
- Years active: 1961–1994

Sudharani Jena (6 February 1942 – 22 August 2023) was an Indian Odia-language actress from Odisha. She started her career in Ollywood in 1961 through Parinam. In 1976 she returned to the Industry through Gapa Hele Bi Sata and was active until 1994.

== Early life ==
Sudharani Jena was born on 6 February 1942. She was a gynaecologist by profession. During her medical college days, she had received the best actress award in college drama every year.

== Career ==
Jena debuted as a lead actor in Odia film industry through Parinam directed by Biswanath Nayak in 1961. In this movie, she was credited as Geetisudha. After that, she took a break and returned to the industry through Gapa Hele Bi Sata in 1976 in the character of a mother. Later she played various roles in movies like Rama Balarama, Kaveri, Jhiati Sitapari, Sankha Mahuri, Topae Sindura Di Pata Sankha, Bhagya Hate Dori, Gadhi Janile Ghara Sindura, etc.

== Death ==
Sudharani Jena died on 22 August 2023, at the age of 81.

== Filmography ==
Year	Title	Roles	Note
1961	Parinam		Debuted in Ollywood
1976	Gapa Hele Bi Sata		
1978	Sankha Mahuri		
1978	Janmadata		
1980	Rama Balarama		
1983	Kaveri		
1983	Jhiati Sita Pari		
1983	Dekh Khabar Rakh Najar	Mother of Jayant	
1987	Jayadev		
1989	Topae Sindura Di Pata Sankha		
1993	Bhagya Hate Dori	Alaka	
1994	Gadhi Janile Ghara Sundara	Ranga	
