= Mamta Ki Chhaon Mein =

Bollywood 1989 film

- Directed by: Kishore Kumar; Amit Kumar
- Written by: Kishore Kumar; Pradeep Roy Chowdhury (dialogue)
- Produced by: Kishore Kumar
- Starring: Ashok Kumar; Rajesh Khanna; Amit Kumar; Leena Chandavarkar; Debashree Roy
- Music by: Kishore Kumar
- Release date: 18 August 1989
- Country: India
- Language: Hindi

Mamta Ki Chhaon Mein is a 1989 Indian family drama film directed by Kishore Kumar and starring by Amit Kumar, Ashok Kumar, Rajesh Khanna and Leena Chandavarkar. It was released after death of Kishore Kumar.

== Plot ==
A mother raises her two sons with lots of love and care. She gives them the right values to be good human beings and makes sure that they grow up to be successful and responsible. Years pass by and the boys grow up to be men. They have graduated from their education and have started working in big organizations, while their mother is now old and frail. Soon the sons decide to have a life of their own and move out into their own house leaving their old mother behind. Little do the men realize that the mother now needs their love and care just like she gave them when they were young.

== Soundtrack ==
The music of the film was composed by Kishore Kumar, while lyrics were written by Kishore Kumar, Shailendra, Hasrat Jaipuri, and Anjaan.

1. "Mera Geet Adhoora Hai" - Kishore Kumar
2. "Teri Jeevan Gaadi" - Kishore Kumar
3. "Main Ek Panchi Matwala Re" - Amit Kumar
4. "Beeti Jaye Zindagi" - Amit Kumar
5. "Tod Ke Bandhan Sare Jeevan Jot Jagaye" - Amit Kumar
6. "Kaise Katengi Ratiyan" - Bushan Mehta, Jolly Mukherjee, Pankaj Mitra, and Sunil Indori
7. "Na Re Na Mujhse Door Na Jaana" - Leena Chandarvarkar
8. "Andhiyari Raahon Mein" (Duet Version) - Amit Kumar and Leena Chandarvarkar
9. "Andhiyari Raahon Mein" (Male Version) - Amit Kumar

== Cast ==
- Ashok Kumar
- Rajesh Khanna
- Amit Kumar
- Anoop Kumar
- Leena Chandavarkar
- A. K. Hangal
- Raj Babbar
- Pradeep Kumar
- Deb Mukherjee
- Debashree Roy
- Jagdeep
