= Duniya Meri Jeb Mein =

- Directed by: Tinnu Anand
- Written by: Inder Raj Anand
- Produced by: Naresh Malhotra; Bittu Anand
- Starring: Shashi Kapoor; Rishi Kapoor; Neetu Singh; Ranjeet
- Music by: Rajesh Roshan
- Release date: 10 August 1979
- Country: India
- Language: Hindi

Duniya Meri Jeb Mein (transl. The world in my pocket) is a 1979 Indian Hindi-language action film directed by Tinnu Anand, starring Shashi Kapoor, Rishi Kapoor, and Neetu Singh in pivotal roles with music composed by Rajesh Roshan.

== Plot ==
Vishal Khanna, a student in a prestigious college, believes he lives a wealthy lifestyle along with his brother, Karan Khanna, a businessman. Vishal meets and falls in love with Neeta, the only daughter of wealthy widower, Gulabchand. Gulabchand meets with Karan and both finalize Vishal and Neeta's marriage. Then things spiral out of control when Gulabchand is killed while Karan is run over by a lorry and ends up losing both his legs. Vishal undertakes to look after the now crippled Karan, but has more surprises to face when Police Inspector Yadav informs him that Karan was never a businessman, but a trapeze artiste in Amar Circus and is also a suspect of a daring robbery and the murder of Gulabchand.

== Cast ==
- Shashi Kapoor as Karan Khanna
- Rishi Kapoor as Vishal Khanna
- Neetu Singh as Neeta
- Ranjeet as Rawat
- Agha as Diwanchand
- Raj Mehra as Gulabchand
- Pinchoo Kapoor as Thakurdas
- Nadira as Mrs. Robins
- Paintal as Bhaskar
- Lalita Pawar as Supervisor (Girls Hostel)
- Jagdish Raj as Supervisor (Boys Hostel)
- Keshto Mukherjee as Watchman (Boys Hostel)
- Sudhir as Inspector Yadav
- Helen as Bar Dancer

== Soundtrack ==
Lyricist: Gulshan Bawra

Song	Singer
"Dekh Mausam Keh Raha Hai, Baahon Mein Aake Meri"	Lata Mangeshkar, Amit Kumar
"Tere Jaisa Bhai Sabko Mile" (Happy)	Kishore Kumar, Mohammed Rafi
"Tere Jaisa Bhai Sabko Mile" (Sad)	Kishore Kumar, Mohammed Rafi
"Saari Ki Saari Yeh Duniya Meri Jeb Mein"	Kishore Kumar, Asha Bhosle
"Kuch Sochoon, Haan Socho, Kuch Boloon, Haan Bolo"	Kishore Kumar, Asha Bhosle
"Yeh Bhi Dil Maangta"	Asha Bhosle
