= Derek Bose =

Indian film critic

Derek Bose (born 15 September 1956 in Calcutta) is an author and journalist who specializes in Bollywood and other aspects of India's film industry. An alumnus of St Columba's, New Delhi, he has held senior editorial positions with India's premier news organisations, the Press Trust of India and the Indian Express. His features have appeared in leading journals across the world, including Screen International (USA), Leicester Mercury (U.K.), Post Natal (South Africa), Khaleej Times, Gulf News (UAE) and New Straits Times (Malaysia).

== Works ==
Bose is the author of the following books on cinema:

- Bollywood Unplugged: Deconstructing Cinema in Black & White (Frog Books)
- Kishore Kumar: Method in Madness (Rupa & Co), a coffee-table book published for the Bollywood icon's birthday
- Bollywood Uncensored: What You Don’t See on Screen and Why (Rupa & Co), focusing on the censoring of Bollywood films
- Everybody Wants a Hit: 10 Mantras of Success in Bollywood Cinema (Jaico)
- Sameer: A Way With Words (Gayatri Publications), a coffee-table book focusing on one of Bollywood's premier lyricists.
- Brand Bollywood: A New Global Entertainment Order (Sage), which focused on the media convergence surrounding Bollywood and the revenue generation that is still developing, together with what is required to move forward.

== Awards ==
In 2007, he was awarded the Rastriya Ratna as the best Indian film journalist of the year.
