= Door Ka Raahi =

1971 Indian Bollywood drama film

- Directed by: Kishore Kumar
- Written by: Kishore Kumar
- Starring: Tanuja; Kishore Kumar; Ashok Kumar
- Edited by: R M Tipnis
- Music by: Kishore Kumar
- Release date: 1971
- Running time: 138 minutes
- Country: India
- Language: Hindi

Door Ka Raahi is a 1971 Indian Hindi-language drama film directed by Kishore Kumar. The film stars Tanuja, Kishore Kumar and Ashok Kumar. The film is a great depiction of the directorial abilities of Kishore Kumar and his vision of the eternal world. The film strives to deliver a very strong message to humanity using the simplest possible language. This film was adapted from an American movie called Shane 1953 directed and produced by George Stevens and starring Alan Ladd, Jean Arthur, Van Heflin, Brandon deWilde, and Jack Palance. Kishore Kumar was heavily influenced from the film Shane, and made this film based on it.

== Plot ==
Door Ka Raahi is the story of a person named "Prashant" who is on an unending journey for the wellness of society. Door Ka Raahi is also all about Kishore Kumar's philosophy of life. It depicts with brilliance Kishore Kumar's inner self and the way he construed life in all its ups and downs. The movie is a metaphor that depicts the endless eternal journey of the human soul that is unaware of its destiny and has to continue with its journey in the quest of the eternal unknown. Kishore-da's all-time favourite "Panthi hoon main us path ka aanth nahi jiska" and "Chalti chali jaaye zindagi" are the manifestation of his eternal quest. His exuberance and flamboyance were the veil for this inwardly lonely person. His loneliness and brilliance found expression in Door Ka Raahi and Door Vadiyon Mein Kahin.

== Cast ==
- Kishore Kumar
- Tanuja
- Ashok Kumar
- Padma Khanna
- Amit Kumar
- Abhi Bhattacharya
- Asit Sen
- Hiralal
- Ganga

== Songs ==
Track #	Song	Singer(s)	Raga
1	"Beqarar Dil Tu Gaaye Jaa (Duet)"	Kishore Kumar, Sulakshana Pandit	Kirwani
2	"Khushi Do Ghadi Ki"	Kishore Kumar	
3	"Jeevan Se Na Haar"	Kishore Kumar	
4	"Chalti Chale Jaaye Zindagi"	Hemant Kumar	
5	"Panthi Hoon Main Us Path Ka"	Kishore Kumar	Bhimpalasi
6	"Main Ek Panchhi Matwala Re"	Amit Ganguly	
7	"Mujhe Kho Jane Do"	Kishore Kumar	
8	"Ek Din Aur Aa Gaya"	Manna Dey	
9	"Beqarar Dil Gaaye Jaa (Male)"	Kishore Kumar	

All the songs were composed by Kishore Kumar. The lyrics were written by Irshad and Kishore Kumar, except for the songs "Ek Din Aur Aa Gaya," & "Chalti chale jaaye zindagi" which were written by Shailendra.

Sulakshana's first assignment as a playback singer for a well-known heroine (Tanuja) came courtesy Kishore Kumar in the movie Door Ka Raahi.
