= Gapa Hele Bi Sata (1976 film) =

- Directed by: Nagen Ray
- Starring: Harish Mohapatra; Banaja Mohanty; Netrananda
- Music by: Hariprasad Chaurasia; Bhubaneswar Mishra (as Bhuban-Hari)
- Release date: 1976
- Country: India
- Language: Odia

Gapa Hele Bi Sata (1976) is the first colour film in the Odia Language. It was directed by Nagen Ray starring Harish Mohapatra and Banaja Mohanty. The story was penned by Basant Mohapatra and screenplayed by P.D. Cinematographer: Surendra kumar Sahoo, Art Director : Nikhil Baran Sengupta, Shenoy.

== Cast ==
- Harish Mohapatra
- Banaja Mohnty
- Niharika Sahu
- Durlabh
- Suresh Mohapatra
- Netrananda
- Sudharani Jena
- Soudamini
