= List of songs recorded by Kavita Krishnamurti =

Hindi language songs sung by Kavita Khrishnamurthy

This is a list of known Hindi songs performed by Kavita Krishnamurthy from 1976 to date. She had also sung in several languages which are not included here. She has recorded numerous songs in many India Languages.

== 1970s ==
=== 1976 ===
This is a remake of a Lata Mangeshkar song.

Film	No	Song	Composer(s)	Co-artist(s)
Kadambari	1	Aayega Aane Waala	Ustad Vilayat Khan	solo

== 1980s ==
=== 1980 ===
Film	No	Song	Composer(s)	Co-artist(s)
Maang Bharo Sajana	2	"Kahe Ko Babul"	Laxmikant - Pyarelal	solo

=== 1981 ===
Film	No	Song	Composer(s)	Co-artist(s)
Ladies Tailor	3	Ab Yeh Jaana Ke Isse Kehte Hain	Laxmikant - Pyarelal	Mohammed Rafi

=== 1982 ===
Film	No	Song	Composer(s)	Co-artist(s)
Jeeo Aur Jeene Do	4	Alibaba O Alibaba Teri Ishq Me	Laxmikant - Pyarelal	Suresh Wadkar
Jeevan Dhaara	5	Jaldi Se Aa Mere Pardesi	Laxmikant - Pyarelal	Alka Yagnik; Anuradha Paudwal
Raaste Pyar Ke	6	Log Jal Gaye	Laxmikant - Pyarelal	Anuradha Paudwal; Kishore Kumar
Zakhmi Insaan	7	Main to Sej Sajake Baithi	Nadeem - Shravan	solo

=== 1983 ===
Film	No	Song	Composer(s)	Co-artist(s)
Aao Pyar Karen	8	Shivaji Chale	Manas Mukharjee	Udit Narayan; Aarti Mukharjee; Yunus
Kalka	9	Luchhe Bharatiya Chale Aaye	Jagjit Singh	
Woh 7 Din	10	Payalia	Laxmikant - Pyarelal	Suresh Wadkar

=== 1984 ===
Film	No	Song	Composer(s)	Writer(s)	Co-artist(s)
Bahadur Shah Zafar	11	"Ab to Ghabra Ke Yeh Kehte Hai"	Rajkamal		Anuradha Paudwal
Boxer	12	"Hai Mubarak Aaj Ka Din"	R. D. Burman		Vanita Mishra; Hariharan
Ek Nai Paheli	13	"Yeh Preet Aisi Paheli"	Laxmikant - Pyarelal		Lata Mangeshkar
Farishta	14	"Bade Logon Ki Badi Badi Baton Se"	R. D. Burman		Anuradha Paudwal; Amit Kumar; Vivek Bajaj
Hum Hain Lajawab	15	"Main Dilruba Hoon"	R. D. Burman	Anand Bakshi	solo
Insaaf Kaun Karega	16	"Tujhe Dekhe Bina"	Laxmikant-Py]arelal	Sameer	Shabbir Kumar
Insaaf Kaun Karega	17	"Hathkariyan Pehnoongi"	Laxmikant-Py]arelal	Sameer	solo
Karishmaa	18	"Ek Haseen Lakhon Mein"	R. D. Burman	Gulshan Bawra	solo
Zakhmi Sher	19	"Dekha Jo Tujhko To Pyar Ho Gaya"	Laxmikant - Pyarelal		Shabbir Kumar

=== 1985 ===
Film	No	Song	Composer(s)	Writer(s)	Co-artist(s)
Alag Alag	20	"Roop Tera Mastana"	R. D. Burman	Anand Bakshi	solo
Ameer Aadmi Gareeb Aadmi	21	"Dhak Dhak Dhadke Yeh Dil"	R. D. Burman	Nida Fazli	Suresh Wadkar; Hariharan; Shailendra Singh
Maha Shaktimaan	22	"Ang Ang Se Chand"	Bappi Lahiri		K. J. Yesudas
Meraa Ghar Mere Bachche	23	"Kele Ki Hui Hai Sagaai"	Laxmikant - Pyarelal	Anand Bakshi	solo
Pyaar Jhukta Nahin	24	"Tumse Milkar Na Jaane"	Laxmikant - Pyarelal	S. H. Bihari	solo
Rahi Badal Gaye	25	"Meri Dua Hai" (Duet)	R. D. Burman	Gulshan Bawra	Shailendra Singh
Sanjog	26	"Aankh Micholi Aise Mujhse"	Laxmikant - Pyarelal		S. P. Sailaja
Sur Sangham	27	"Sur Ka Hai Sopaan Sureela"	Laxmikant - Pyarelal		Rajan Mishra; Sajan Mishra
Teri Meherbaniyan	28	"Aanchal Udaya Maine"	Laxmikant - Pyarelal	S. H. Bihari	Shabbir Kumar
Teri Meherbaniyan	29	"Aai Jawani Mori Chunariya"	Laxmikant - Pyarelal	S. H. Bihari	solo

=== 1986 ===
Film	No	Song	Composer(s)	Writer(s)	Co-artist(s)
Aag Aur Shola	30	"Ek Ladki Jiska Naam"	Laxmikant - Pyarelal	Anand Bakshi	Mohammed Aziz
Adhikar	31	"Main Dil Tu Dharkan"	Bappi Lahiri		Solo
Aisa Pyaar Kahan	32	"Teri Bagon Ki Bulbul"	Laxmikant - Pyarelal		Solo
Aisa Pyaar Kahan	33	"Kya Jodi Hai"	Laxmikant - Pyarelal		Mohammed Aziz
Aisa Pyaar Kahan	34	"Sawan Ka Mahina"	Laxmikant - Pyarelal		Mohammed Aziz
Amrit	35	"Shrafat Ali Ko Sharafat Ne Mara"	Laxmikant - Pyarelal		Mohammed Aziz; Jaspal Singh; Mahendra Kapoor
Angaaray	36	"Ik Tehzeebon Ka Sangam"	Anu Malik		Solo
Asli Naqli	37	"Teri Botal Ban Gayi Sautan"	Laxmikant - Pyarelal	S.H. Bihari	Laxmikant
Asli Naqli	38	"Roj Milte Ho Babuji Mele Me"	Laxmikant - Pyarelal	S.H. Bihari	Solo
Asli Naqli	39	"Ek To Ye Bharpur Jawani"	Laxmikant - Pyarelal	S.H. Bihari	Dilraj Kaur
Chhota Aadmi	40	"Main Hoon Toh Chhota Aadmi"	Mahesh Kanodia and Naresh Kanodia		Kishore Kumar
Dosti Dushmani	41	"Munne Ki Amma"	Laxmikant - Pyarelal		Mohammed Aziz
Dosti Dushmani	42	"Jhatke Pe Jhatke"	Laxmikant - Pyarelal		Mohammed Aziz
Dosti Dushmani	43	"Saat Baras Ka Dulha"	Laxmikant - Pyarelal		Mohammed Aziz; Shailendra Singh
Ganga Aakhir Ganga Hai	44	"Tujhe Milne Ko Aaya Tera Yaar"	Surinder Kohli		Anup Jalota; Shailendra Singh
Jwala	45	"O Dekho Aaye Jawaani Ke Din"	Jagjit Singh		Asha Bhosle
Karma	46	"Na Jaiyo Pardes"	Laxmikant - Pyarelal		Kishore Kumar
Karma	47	"Aye Watan Tere Liye"	Laxmikant - Pyarelal		Mohammed Aziz
Karma	48	"Aye Sanam Tere Liye"	Laxmikant - Pyarelal		Mohammed Aziz
Love 86	49	"Main Jab Bhi"	Laxmikant - Pyarelal	S.H. Bihari	Shabbir Kumar
Love 86	50	"Pyar Ki Had Se"	Laxmikant - Pyarelal	Santosh Anand	Mohammed Aziz
Love 86	51	"Mehboob Se Hamare"	Laxmikant - Pyarelal	S.H. Bihari	Mohammed Aziz
Naseeb Apna Apna	52	"Bhala Hai Bura Hai Jaisa Bhi Hai 2"	Laxmikant - Pyarelal		Anuradha Paudwal
Mazloom	53	"Kal Hon Na Hon Jahan Mein"	Laxmikant - Pyarelal		Suresh Wadkar
Naam	54	"Tere Dil Ki Tu Jaane"	Laxmikant - Pyarelal	Anand Bakshi	Solo
Nagina	55	"Balma Tum Balma Ho Mere Khali Naam Ke"	Laxmikant - Pyarelal	Anand Bakshi	Solo
Pyar Ke Do Pal	56	"Daddy Yaad Aate Hain"	Anu Malik		Baby Munmi
Pyar Kiya Hai Pyar Karenge	57	"Pyar Kiya Hai Pyar Karenge"	Laxmikant - Pyarelal		Shabbir Kumar
Qatl	58	Yeh Mohabbat Dard Hai Kya	Laxmikant - Pyarelal		Solo
Sadaa Suhagan	59	"Kehta Hai Sindoor Tera"	Laxmikant - Pyarelal		Solo
Sadaa Suhagan	60	"Hum Hain Naujawan"	Laxmikant - Pyarelal		Vijay Benedict
Sadaa Suhagan	61	"Kehta Hai Sindoor Tera" (Sad)	Laxmikant - Pyarelal		Solo
Sadaa Suhagan	62	"Kabhie Kabhie Main Sochoon"	Laxmikant - Pyarelal		Solo
Sadaa Suhagan	63	"Kabhie Kabhie Main Sochoon" (Sad)	Laxmikant - Pyarelal		Solo
Siyahi	64	"Isse Se Badkar Baat Kya Hogi"	Kirti Anuraag		Solo
Siyahi	65	"Zindagi to Zindagi Hai"	Kirti Anuraag		Solo
Swati	66	"Main Tere Saath Hoon"	Laxmikant - Pyarelal		Manhar Udhas

=== 1987 ===
Film	No	Song	Composer(s)	Writer(s)	Co-artist(s)
Anjaam	67	"Saat Ke Duniya Patthar"	Laxmikant - Pyarelal		Asha Bhosle
Aulad	68	"Jeevan Jyot Jale"	Laxmikant - Pyarelal		Solo
Aulad	69	"Ek Maa Ka Dil"	Laxmikant - Pyarelal		Solo
Aulad	70	"Ton Ton Ton"	Laxmikant - Pyarelal		Solo
Aulad	71	"To Phir Ho Jaye"	Laxmikant - Pyarelal		Kishore Kumar
Bijlee Aur Toofan	72	"Khilone Wali Aayee"	Anwar - Usman		Chandrani Mukharjee
Bijlee Aur Toofan	73	"Lalaji Jiye Tora Lalla"	Anwar - Usman		Bhusan
Dilruba Tangewali	74	"Khai Ke Mainpuri Tambaku'	Anwar - Usman		Mohd Aziz
Dilruba Tangewali	75	"Dilruba Tangewali"	Anwar - Usman		Solo
Hukumat	76	"Na Zulm Na Zalim Ka"	Laxmikant - Pyarelal		Alka Yagnik; Mohd Aziz
Hukumat	77	"Es Afsar Ka Baja"	Laxmikant - Pyarelal		Mohd Aziz
Hukumat	78	"Ram Ram Bol"	Laxmikant - Pyarelal		Alka Yagnik; Shabbir Kumar
Insaf Ki Pukar	79	"Pyar Ka Shola Bhadka"	Laxmikant - Pyarelal		Kishore Kumar
Insaf Ki Pukar	80	"Aa Aa Mere Diljani"	Laxmikant - Pyarelal		Kishore Kumar
Itihaas	81	"Aao Tumhein Pyar"	R D Burman		K J Yesudas
Jawab Hum Denge	82	"Teri Ankh Mastani Hai"	Laxmikant - Pyarelal		Shabbir Kumar
Jawab Hum Denge	83	"Banjaran Main Banjaran"	Laxmikant - Pyarelal		Solo
Jawab Hum Denge	84	"Mere Kis Kasoor Per"	Laxmikant - Pyarelal		Solo
Kachchi Kali	85	"Tumse Hi Pyar Hai"	Usha Khanna		Solo
Loha	86	Saat Taalon Mein Rakh	Laxmikant - Pyarelal		Anuradha Paudwal
Loha	87	"Patli Kamar Lambe Baal"	Laxmikant - Pyarelal		Anuradha Paudwal
Loha	88	"Teri Hasti Kya Hai"	Laxmikant - Pyarelal		Anuradha Paudwal; Shabbir Kumar
Manav Hatya	89	"Simki Samoka"	Annu Malik		Malik Brothers
Mr. India	90	"Kartein Hain Hum Pyar"	Laxmikant-Pyarelal		Kishore Kumar
Mr. India	91	"Hawa Hawai"	Laxmikant-Pyarelal		Solo
Nazrana	92	"Aye Babrika Aye Reeka Reeka"	Laxmikant - Pyarelal	Solo	
Parivaar	93	"Baat Pate Ki Kahe Madari"	Laxmikant - Pyarelal		Kishore Kumar
Parivaar	94	"Cham Cham Chanda Ki"	Laxmikant - Pyarelal		Anupama Deshpande; Baby Tabassum
Parivaar	95	"Aankhon Aankhon Mein"	Laxmikant - Pyarelal		Mohd Aziz
Parivaar	96	"Ram Bhakt Hanuman"	Laxmikant - Pyarelal		Solo
Raat Ke Andhere Mein	97	"Nahin Lake Dega Challa"	Surinder Kohli		Solo
Raat Ke Andhere Mein	98	"Tujhe Dilbar Bulaya Pasand Karke"	Surinder Kohli		Solo
Sansar	99	"Main Aaj Bahot Khush Hoon"	Laxmikant-Pyarelal		Solo
Satyamev Jayate	100	"De Rahi Hai Duain"	Bappi Lahiri		Solo
Satyamev Jayate	101	"De Rahi Hai Duain" (Sad)	Bappi Lahiri		Solo
Shahadat	102	"Chan Chan Bundhe"	Kirti Anuraag		Solo
Sindoor	103	"Chalo Chalo Door Kahin"	Laxmikant - Pyarelal		Mohd Aziz
Uttar Dakshin	104	"Thodi Si Aag Hai"	Laxmikant - Pyarelal	Anand Bakshi	Hariharan
Uttar Dakshin	105	"Us Kashti Ka Kya Hoga"	Laxmikant - Pyarelal	Anand Bakshi	solo
Uttar Dakshin	106	"Us Kashti Ka Kya Hoga" (2nd Version)	Laxmikant - Pyarelal	Anand Bakshi	Solo
Watan Ke Rakhwale	107	"Tere Mere Beech Mein"	Laxmikant - Pyarelal		
Watan Ke Rakhwale	108	"Tanna Tan"	Laxmikant - Pyarelal		Suresh Wadkar; Mohd Aziz

=== 1988 ===
Film	No	Song	Composer(s)	Writer(s)	Co-artist(s)
7 Bijliyaan	109	"Jal Pariyan Hum Jal Pariyan"	Usha Khanna		Usha Khanna
Akarshan	110	"Mausam Ka Taqaaza Hai"	Ajit Singh		Ajit Singh
Akarshan	111	"Faasla Rahe Na Aaj"	Ajit Singh		Solo
Akarshan	112	"Zindagi Waqt Ka Aaina Hai"	Ajit Singh		Ajit Singh
Aurat Teri Yehi Kahani	113	"Hamara Jobanava"	Anand - Milind		Alka Yagnik
Be-Lagaam	114	"Dil Mein Lagi Hai"	R D Burman		Mohd Aziz
Be-Lagaam	115	"O Be-Wafa"	R D Burman		Mohd Aziz
Dayavan	116	"Kahe Saiyan Teri Meri"	Laxmikant - Pyarelal		Alka Yagnik
Ganga Tere Desh Mein	117	"Ganga Tere Desh Mein	Laxmikant - Pyarelal		Solo
Ghayal Sherni (Dubbed)	118	"O Saathi Pyar Do"	Usha Khanna		Vinod Rathod
Ghayal Sherni (Dubbed)	119	"Dil de Chuke"	Usha Khanna		Vinod Rathod
Ghayal Sherni (Dubbed)	120	"Mast Mola Dil Bola"	Usha Khanna		Vinod Rathod
Ghayal Sherni (Dubbed)	121	"Yaar Mere Dil Se Dil"	Usha Khanna		Vinod Rathod
Ghayal Sherni (Dubbed)	122	"Dil Mera Ho Gaya Beqabu"	Usha Khanna		Vinod Rathod
Hum Dahej Laye Hain	123	"Main to Balma"	Jugal Kishore - Tilak Raaj		Solo
Inteqam	124	"Jaise Ek Chand Ka Tukda"	Laxmikant - Pyarelal	Nitin Mukesh; Mohd Aziz	
Inteqam	125	"Khuda Ke Liye"	Laxmikant - Pyarelal		Solo
Inteqam	126	"Ab Main Naachungi"	Laxmikant - Pyarelal		Solo
Janam Janam	127	"Ho Ho Chhal Chhal	Laxmikant - Pyarelal		Mohd Aziz
Janam Janam	128	"Koi Patta Bhi Hila"	Laxmikant - Pyarelal		Mohd Aziz
Jeete Hain Shan Se	129	"Jeete Hai Shaan Se"	Annu Malik		Anuradha Paudwal; Amit Kumar; Shabbir Kumar; Shailendra Singh
Jeete Hain Shan Se	130	"Julie Julie"	Annu Malik		Anu Malik
Khatron Ke Khiladi	131	"Premiyon Ke Dil"	Laxmikant - Pyarelal		Anuradha Paudwal; Amit Kumar; Mohd Aziz
Khoon Baha Ganga Mein	132	"Meri Baaton Se Aayega"	Anand - Milind		Solo
Khoon Baha Ganga Mein	133	"Zulmi Saiyaan Pakdo Na Baiyaan"	Anand - Milind		Solo
Mar Mitenge	134	"Badon Ka Hai Farmaana"	Laxmikant - Pyarelal		Anuradha Paudwal; Mohd Aziz; Shailendra Singh
Mera Muqaddar	135	"Chithi Aaye Gayee Babu"	Kamalkant		Alka Yagnik; Mohd Aziz
Mera Muqaddar	136	"Kab Se Ye Dil Hai Pyasa"	Kamalkant		Prem Chopra
Nagin Aur Nagina	137	"Barkha Aayee Aaja"	Jeetu - Tapan	Shabbir Kumar	
Nagin Aur Nagina	138	"Jag Mein Tu Nyara"	Jeetu - Tapan	Shabbir Kumar	
Prem Sandesh	140	"Main Hoon Shrab Ki Botal"	Basu Chakravarthy		Dilraj Kaur
Pyaar Ka Mandir	141	"Log Jahan Par"	Laxmikant - Pyarelal		Mohd Aziz; Suresh Wadkar; Udit Narayan
Pyar Mohabbat	142	"Dil Ke Kalam Se"	Laxmikant - Pyarelal		Shabbir Kumar
Pyar Mohabbat	143	"Ek Maa Ek Munna"	Laxmikant - Pyarelal		Shabbir Kumar
Pyar Mohabbat	144	"Ek Maa Ek Munna" (Part 2)	Laxmikant - Pyarelal		Shabbir Kumar
Pyar Mohabbat	145	"Tina Ke Mina"	Laxmikant - Pyarelal		Mohd Aziz
Qatil	146	"Bolo Miss Kiss Kis Ke Liye"	Laxmikant - Pyarelal		Amit Kumar; Shabbir Kumar
Rihaee	147	"Dilli Main Mera Dil"	Sharang Dev		Udit Narayan; Anupama Deshpande; Pankaj Mitra
Sagar Sangam	148	"Main Bairagi Tohe	Bappi Lahiri	Chandrani Mukharjee	
Shiva-Shakti	149	"Mere Dil Ne Tujhe Chaha"	Anand - Milind		Suresh Wadkar
Shiva-Shakti	150	"Mere Dil Ne Tujhe Chaha" (Sad)	Anand - Milind		Suresh Wadkar
Shoorveer	151	Awaaz Hamari Isi Waadi Mein	Laxmikant - Pyarelal		Mohd Aziz
Shoorveer	152	"Awaaz Hamari"	Laxmikant - Pyarelal		Anuradha Paudwal
Tamacha	153	"Jaago Mere Naag Devta"	Bappi Lahiri		Mohd Aziz
Vaishali (Dubbed)	154	"Nain Tau Kholo"	Ravi	Solo	
Vaishali (Dubbed)	155	"Sola Sringar Kar Ke"	Ravi	Shabbir Kumar	
Vasna Ki Aag	156	"Maa Shakti De"	Raam Laxman		Mohd Aziz
Vasna Ki Aag	157	"Haye Rabba"	Raam Laxman		Solo
Vasna Ki Aag	158	"Itihaas Gawah Hoga"	Raam Laxman		Mohd Aziz
Yateem		"Dil Ne Chaha Hai Kya"	Laxmikant_Pyarelal	Hasan Kamal	Solo
Yateem		"Rut Piya Milan Ka"	Laxmikant_Pyarelal	Hasan Kamal	Sukhwinder Singh
Yateem		"Aake Tujh Par"	Laxmikant_Pyarelal	Hasan Kamal	Shabbir Kumar
Yateem		"Itna Aasan Nahi"	Laxmikant_Pyarelal	Hasan Kamal	Solo
Yeh Pyaar Nahin	159	"O Mehmaanon"			
Zalzala	160	"Arre Chakoo Chale"	R D Burman		Kishore Kumar
Zanjeeren	161	"Diya Diya Dil Diya"	R. D. Burman	Anjaan	

=== 1989 ===
Film	No	Song	Composer(s)	Writer(s)	Co-artist(s)
Aag Se Khelenge	162	"Chhede Been Sapra"	R D Burman		Asha Bhosle; Amit Kumar; Udit Narayan
Bade Ghar Ki Beti	163	"Karna Fakiri Phir Kya Dilgiri" (version 1)	Laxmikant - Pyarelal	Santosh Anand	Suresh Wadkar
Bade Ghar Ki Beti	164	"Karna Fakiri Phir Kya Dilgiri" (version 2)	Laxmikant - Pyarelal	Santosh Anand	Suresh Wadkar
Bade Ghar Ki Beti	164	"Bade Ghar Ki Beti Ke Nakhre Bade"	Laxmikant - Pyarelal	Santosh Anand	Anuradha Paudwal, Suresh Wadkar
Bahurani	165	"Chhora Chhori Se Bhi Gora"	R D Burman		Asha Bhosle
Bandook Dahej Ke Seeney Par	166	"Main to Balma Use Banau"	Jugal Kishore - Tilak Raaj		Solo
Bandook Dahej Ke Seeney Par	167	"Aayee Ayee Sagai"	Jugal Kishore - Tilak Raaj		Shailendra Singh; Shabbir Kumar; Jaishree Shivram
Batwara	168	"Thare Vaaste Re Dhola"	Laxmikant - Pyarelal		Alka Yagnik; Anuradha Paudwal
Batwara	169	"Jo Main Aisa Jaanti"	Laxmikant - Pyarelal		Anuradha Paudwal
Bhrashtachar	170	"She is My Girlfriend"	Laxmikant-Pyarelal		Amit Kumar
Billoo Baadshah	171	"Pyar Karenge Abhi Karenge"	Jagjit Singh		Kumar Sanu
ChaalBaaz	172	Na Jane Kahan Se	Laxmikant - Pyarelal		Amit Kumar
ChaalBaaz	173	"Naam Mera Premkali"	Laxmikant - Pyarelal		Solo
ChaalBaaz	174	"Gadbad Ho Gayee"	Laxmikant - Pyarelal		Amit Kumar; Jolly Mukharjee
ChaalBaaz	175	"Bhoot Raja"	Laxmikant - Pyarelal		Sudesh Bhosle; Johnny Lever
ChaalBaaz	176	"Tera Bimar Mera Dil"	Laxmikant - Pyarelal		Mohd Aziz
Deshwasi	177	"Aaj Holi Hai"	Laxmikant - Pyarelal		Anuradha Paudwal; Nitin Mukesh
Do Qaidi	178	"Allah Allah Yeh Kaisa Gazab"	Laxmikant - Pyarelal		Shabbir Kumar
Do Qaidi	179	"Aa Rab Se Dua Mange"	Laxmikant - Pyarelal		Anuradha Paudwal; Mohd Aziz; Suresh Wadkar
Do Qaidi	180	"Yeh Chali Yeh Chali"	Laxmikant - Pyarelal		Laxmikant
Dost Garibon Ka	181	"Dekhne Ki Cheez Hoon Mein"	Laxmikant - Pyarelal		Solo
Dost Garibon Ka	182	"Kafan Apna Kabhi"	Laxmikant - Pyarelal		Mohd Aziz
Eeshwar	183	"Kaushalya Mein Teri Tu Mera"	Laxmikant - Pyarelal		Nitin Mukesh
Eeshwar	184	"Baj Utha Saanson Mein"	Laxmikant - Pyarelal		solo
Eeshwar	185	"Aage Sukh to Peeche"	Laxmikant - Pyarelal		Nitin Mukesh
Gabrahat	186	"Tere Mere Beech Mein"	Ravindra Jain	Ravindra Jain	Solo
Gabrahat	187	"Sochke Humse Aankh Milana"	Ravindra Jain	Ravindra Jain	Hemlata
Hathyar	188	"Der Se Aaye Door Se Aaye"	Laxmikant - Pyarelal		Solo
Hum Bhi Insaan Hain	189	"Jab Ladka Sharmayega"	Bappi Lahiri		Shabbir Kumar
Jail Khana	190	Dilbar Janam	Ravindra Jain	Ravindra Jain	Hemlata
Jail Khana	191	"Hum Aankhon Se Pilaye"	Ravindra Jain	Ravindra Jain	
Jungbaaz	192	Ganga Jaisa Man Tera	Ravindra Jain	Ravindra Jain	Mohd Aziz
Jungbaaz	193	"Naam Hai Mera Nina Ninjo"	Ravindra Jain	Ravindra Jain	Solo
Jungbaaz	194	"Ganga Jaisa Man Tera" (Sad)	Ravindra Jain	Ravindra Jain	Mohd Aziz
Kasam Suhaag Ki	195	"Idhar Bhi Bijlee"	Laxmikant - Pyarelal		Solo
Khooni Murdaa	196	"Chaska Chaska Chaska"	Bappi Lahiri		Sudesh Bhosle
Kudrat Ka Faisla (Sadhana)	197	"Toota Hua Mandir Hoon"	Bappi Lahiri		Mohd Aziz
Lahu Ki Awaz	198	Lahu Ki Awaaz Hai	Usha Khanna		Solo
Lahu Ki Awaz	199	"Anmol Meri Jawani"	Usha Khanna		Solo
Lashkar	200	"Swarg Se Pyara Hai"	Nadeem - Shravan		Mohd Aziz; Udit Narayan; Sarika Kapoor
Main Tera Dushman	201	"Jugni Aayee Dhulhan Banke"	Laxmikant - Pyarelal		Solo
Main Tera Dushman	202	"Ye Tera Haathi"	Laxmikant - Pyarelal		Manhar Udhas
Main Tera Dushman	203	"Ae Babu Hum Aaye"	Laxmikant - Pyarelal		Solo
Mera Farz	204	"Phool Se Badan Ki"	Illaiyaraaja		Amit Kumar
Mera Farz	205	"Sunday Monday Tuesday"	Illaiyaraaja		Amit Kumar
Mera Farz	206	"Hoton Pe Tak Tak Dhum"	Illaiyaraaja		Amit Kumar
Naag Nagin	207	"Tu Naag Main Nagin" (duet)	Laxmikant - Pyarelal		Nitin Mukesh
Naag Nagin	208	"Tu Naag Main Nagin"	Laxmikant - Pyarelal		Solo
Nigahen: Nagina Part II	209	"Khel Wohi Phir Aaj Tu Khela"	Laxmikant - Pyarelal		Solo
Nigahen: Nagina Part II	210	"Saara Saara Dil Tum Kaam Karoge"	Laxmikant - Pyarelal		Solo
Nishane Bazi	211	"Main Chor Tu Meri Hum Joli"	Ravindra Jain	Ravindra Jain	Suresh Wadkar
Nishane Bazi	212	"Kar Doon Main Tujhko Maaf"	Ravindra Jain	Ravindra Jain	Solo
Nishane Bazi	213	"Dikhlayenge Ab Khel Madari Dikhlayenge"	Ravindra Jain	Ravindra Jain	Hemlata
Paap Ka Ant	214	Deewane Dil Ke Deewane	Bappi Lahiri		Mohd Aziz
Paap Ka Ant	215	"Ishq Tere Ne"	Bappi Lahiri		Shabbir Kumar
Ram Lakhan	216	"Mere Do Anmol Ratan"	Laxmikant - Pyarelal		Mohd Aziz
Ram Lakhan	217	"Mere Do Anmol Ratan" (Part 2)	Laxmikant - Pyarelal		Mohd Aziz
Sachai Ki Taqat	218	"Aisa Ab Tak Hua Nahin"	Laxmikant-Pyarelal	Anand Bakshi	Amit Kumar
Scandal	219	"Naam Mera Inglistani"	Kirti Anuraag		Suresh Wadkar
Shehzaade	220	"Dheere Dheere Haule Haule"	Laxmikant - Pyarelal		Solo
Shehzaade	221	"Ek Chhora Ek Chhori"	Laxmikant - Pyarelal		Alka Yagnik; Amit Kumar; Shabbir Kumar
Shiv Ganga	222	"Kya Kahoon Kaise Kahoon"	Chitragupt		Alka Yagnik
Sindoor Aur Bandook	223	"Meri Aankh Ka Ishara"	Ajay Swamy		Solo
Suryaa: An Awakening	224	"Allam Gallam Sajana"	Laxmikant - Pyarelal		Uttara Kelkar
Tasveer	225	"Tum Mere Aankhon Ki Pahle Sapne Ho"	Aroon Paresh		Solo
Tu Nagin Main Sapera	226	"Qatil Jawani"	Anwar - Usman		Solo
Tu Nagin Main Sapera	227	"Oh Balma Baiyan Chod"	Anwar - Usman		Suresh Wadkar
Tu Nagin Main Sapera	228	"Mere Sapnon Ke Raja"	Anwar - Usman		solo
Ustaad	229	"O Jaane Jaana"	Annu Malik		Kishore Kumar
Wohi Bhayaanak Raat	230	"Teri Nashili Aankhon Se"	Surinder Kohli		Mohd Aziz

== 1990s ==
=== 1990 ===
Film	No	Song	Composer(s)	Writer(s)	Co-artist(s)	
Aag Ka Darya	234	"Dil Hai Lutne Ko Taiyar"	Laxmikant - Pyarelal		Anuradha Paudwal	
Aaj Ka Arjun	235	"Behna O Behna"	Bappi Lahiri		Mohd Aziz	
Aaj Ka Arjun	236	"Chhod Babul Ka Ghar"	Bappi Lahiri		Solo	
Agneepath	237	"Ganpati Apne Gaon Chale"	Laxmikant - Pyarelal		Anupama Deshpande; Sudesh Bhosle	
Amba	238	"Sheron Wali Mata Ka Jab Naam"	Laxmikant - Pyarelal		Suresh Wadkar; Sukhwinder Singh	
Amiri Garibi	239	"Babul Bhi Roye"	Laxmikant - Pyarelal		Anuradha Paudwal	
Apradhinee	240	"Aaja Re Aa Paas Aa"	Jeetu - Tapan		Suresh Wadkar	
Apradhinee	241	"Raat Nashili Jawan"	Jeetu - Tapan		Solo	
Atishbaaz	242	"Aah Haseen Raat Hai"	Laxmikant - Pyarelal		Solo	
Aurat Aur Patthar	243	"Jeetne Walon Ki Shaan"	Usha Khanna		Anuradha Paudwal	
Azaad Desh Ke Gulam	244	"Roko Roko Julmo Ki Aandhi Ko"	Laxmikant - Pyarelal		Mohd Aziz	
Baaghi	245	"Chandni Raat Hai"	Anand - Milind	Sameer	Abhijeet	
Baaghi	246	"Har Kasam Se Badi Hai"	Anand - Milind	Sameer	Abhijeet	
Bunglow No. 666	247	"Aayi Amawas Ki Raat"	Annu Malik		Kumar Sanu	
Chaal Pe Chaal	248	"Maro Goli"	Laxmikant - Pyarelal		Amit Kumar	
Choron Ki Rani Hasino Ka Raja	249	"Pahen Ke Choli Jaipur Ki"	Anwar - Usman		Anuradha Paudwal	
Choron Ki Rani Hasino Ka Raja	250	"O Chikne Galon Wale" (Parody)	Anwar - Usman		Solo	
Choron Ki Rani Hasino Ka Raja	251	"Main Rani Hoon Duniya Walon"	Anwar - Usman		Anuradha Paudwal	
Choron Ki Rani Hasino Ka Raja	252	"Thanedaar Ji Mujhko Kar Lo"	Anwar - Usman		Mohd Aziz	
Choron Ki Rani Hasino Ka Raja	253	"O Meri Rani Hosh Mein Aa"	Anwar - Usman		Anuradha Paudwal	
Danga Fasaad	254	"Chicky Chicky Chickoo"	Dheeraj Kumar		Amit Kumar	
Deewana Mujhsa Nahin	255	"Saare Ladkon Ki"	Anand - Milind		Solo	
Din Dahade	256	"Jaam Pioji"	Jeetu - Tapan		Solo	
Ghar Ho To Aisa	259	"Dil Laga Ke"	Bappi Lahiri		Mohd Aziz	
Gunahon Ka Devta	260	"Kahin Tu Woh to Nahin"	Annu Malik		Shabbir Kumar	
Haatimtai	261	"Ek Nazar Mein Dekh Le"	Laxmikant - Pyarelal		Alka Yagnik	
Hukum	262	"Laal Pili Nili"	Anand–Milind		Kumar Sanu	
Hum Se Na Takrana	263	"Jitne Ghungroo Jadhe"	Laxmikant - Pyarelal	Anupama Deshpande		
Hum Se Na Takrana	264	"Mera Pyar Hai Tera Vada"	Laxmikant - Pyarelal		Solo	
Hum Se Na Takrana	265	"Mata Tere Dar Pe"	Laxmikant - Pyarelal		Shailendra Singh; Nitin Mukesh; Shabbir Kumar	
Hum Se Na Takrana	266	"Iska Naam Jawani Hai"	Laxmikant - Pyarelal		Mohd Aziz	
Hum Se Na Takrana	267	"Sun O Mere Humjoli"	Laxmikant - Pyarelal		Mohd Aziz	
Insaaf Ka Suraj	268	"Andhere Mein Sataye Ujjale Mein Jalaye"	Bipin Reshammiya		Nitin Mukesh	
Jaan Lada Denge	269	"Anmol Meri Jawani"	Usha Khanna		Solo	
Jamai Raja	270	"Pyar Hua Hai Mujhe Aur Tujhe"	Laxmikant - Pyarelal		Amit Kumar	
Jawani Ki Jalan	271	"Yoga Yoga"	Sonik - Omi		Solo	
Jawani Ki Jalan	272	"Jalta Hai Badan"	Sonik - Omi		Solo	
Jawani Zindabad	273	"Sun Sun Mere Yaar"	Anand - Milind		Amit Kumar	
Jeevan Ek Sanghursh	274	Husn Ki Malika Main	Laxmikant - Pyarelal		Amit Kumar	
Jeevan Ek Sanghursh	275	"He Baba Re Baba"	Laxmikant - Pyarelal		Amit Kumar	
Kanoon Ki Zanjeer	276	"Roj Raaton Ke Parde Gira Ke"	Laxmikant - Pyarelal		Shabbir Kumar	
Kanoon Ki Zanjeer	277	"Roj Raaton Ke Parde Gira Ke"(Sad)	Laxmikant - Pyarelal		Solo	
Kanoon Ki Zanjeer	278	"Aap Ke Dil Ko"	Laxmikant - Pyarelal		Mohd Aziz	
Kanoon Ki Zanjeer	279	"Roj Raaton Ke Parde Gira Ke" (Sad)	Laxmikant - Pyarelal		Shabbir Kumar	
Ladies Hostel	280	"Husn Ka Yeh Mela"	Sonik - Omi		Solo	
Ladies Hostel	281	"Chandani Raat Hai"	Sonik - Omi		Suresh Wadkar	
Ladies Hostel	282	"Dil Hai Mera Ghayal"	Sonik - Omi		Solo	
Lootera Sultan	283	"Godi Ma Humko Uthaile"	Sonik - Omi	Bajju	Kumar Sanu	
Lootera Sultan	284	"Koyal Se Kuhu"	Sonik - Omi	Bajju		Solo
Lootera Sultan	285	"Oye Balle Balle"		Bajju	Mohd Aziz	
Maa Kasam Badla Loonga	286	"Main Pyasa Hoon"	Sonik - Omi		Mohd Aziz	
Majboor	287	"Krishna Govinda Murari"	Laxmikant - Pyarelal		Solo	
Majboor	288	"Dhundoo Dhundoo Idhar Udhar"	Laxmikant - Pyarelal		solo	
Meri Lalkaar	289	"One One Two I Love You"	Vijay Batalvi		Amit Kumar	
Nakabandi	290	"Pyar Kiya Hai"	Bappi Lahiri		Amit Kumar	
Nyay Anyay	291	"Jeeyo Ki Ek Saal"	Anand - Milind		Mangal Singh; Abhijeet	
Pati Parmeshwar	292	"Surmai Andhera Hai"	Laxmikant-Pyarelal		Solo	
Pati Parmeshwar	293	"Mera Pati Mera Parmeshwar"	Laxmikant-Pyarelal	Solo		
Pati Parmeshwar	294	"Jhoomungi Naachungi Main"	Laxmikant-Pyarelal	solo		
Pati Patni Aur Tawaif	295	"Ek Doosre Se Khafa Hona Nahin"	Laxmikant - Pyarelal		Mohd Aziz	
Pati Patni Aur Tawaif	296	"Ek Doosre Se Khafa Hona Nahin" (Sad)	Laxmikant - Pyarelal		Mohd Aziz	
Prem Dharm	297	"Tune to Jag Chod Diya"	Annu Malik		Solo	
Pyar Ka Karz	298	"Sabse Pehla Ye Kaam Kiya"	Laxmikant - Pyarelal		Amit Kumar	
Qayamat Ki Raat	299	"Teri Yaad Aayi"	Laxmikant - Pyarelal		Solo	
Qayamat Ki Raat	300	"Ye Zameen Dekha"		Mohd Aziz		
Rangeen Jawani	301	"Oye Honeymoon Chaleen"	Sonik - Omi		Suresh Wadkar	
Roti Ki Keemat	302	"Le le Narial"	Bappi Lahiri		Solo	
Sailaab	303	"Palkon Ke Tale"	Bappi Lahiri		Amit Kumar	
Shandaar	304	"Haath Mein Mehndi"	Bappi Lahiri		Mohd Aziz	
Sherdil	305	"Kuchh Gana Bajana Ho Jaye"	Laxmikant - Pyarelal		Alka Yagnik; Shailendra Singh; Mohd Aziz	
Sherdil	306	"Adi Ve Adi"	Laxmikant - Pyarelal		Solo	
Shikanja	307	"Jaise Jaise Din"	Bappi Lahiri		Mohd Aziz	
Shiva	308	"Anando Brahma Govindo"	Illaiyaraaja	S P Balsubramanium		
Sindoor Ki Awaaz	309	"Pyar Ki Duniya Tu"	Rajesh Roshan		Mohd Aziz	
Tejaa	310	"Een Meen Saadhe Teen"	Annu Malik		Solo	
Veeru Dada	311	"Maine Tujhe Dil Diya"	Laxmikant - Pyarelal		Sudesh Bhosle	
Zakhmi Zameen	312	"Main Chhamachham Nachun"	Anand - Milind		Mohd Aziz	
Zakhmi Zameen	313	"Jhulania Ghum Gayi"	Anand - Milind		Solo	
Zameer Apna Apna	314	"Hey Hey Hey"	Kamalkant		Ashok Chauhan	
Zameer Apna Apna	315	"Idhar Udhar Maut"	Kamalkant		Sarika Kapoor	
Zameer Apna Apna	316	"Jalwon Ka Taare"	Kamalkant		Solo	

=== 1991 ===
Film	No	Song	Composer(s)	Writer(s)	Co-artist(s)	
Aadmi Aur Apsara	317	"Tumne Is Tarah Mara"	Illaiyaraaja	Indeevar	Amit Kumar	
Aadmi Aur Apsara	318	"Balamaa Hai Tu Mere Dil Ka Mehmaan"	Illaiyaraaja	Indeevar	Amit Kumar	
Aadmi Aur Apsara	319	"Sundar Dekho Bada Lage Sham"	Illaiyaraaja	Indeevar	Amit Kumar	
Aadmi Aur Apsara	320	"Chamke Chama Cham"	Illaiyaraaja	Indeevar	Amit Kumar	
Aadmi Aur Apsara	321	"Tanak Dhin Ta"	Illaiyaraaja	Indeevar	Amit Kumar	
Aaj Ka Samson	322	"De de Toon Pyar"	Prem Gupta	Abhilash	Suresh Wadkar; Dilraj Kaur; Ghanshyam Vaswani	
Aaj Ka Samson	323	"Ayee Hai Jab Se Jawani"	Prem Gupta	Abhilash	Usha Mangeshkar	
Aaj Ka Samson	324	"Saath Tera Chahiye"	Prem Gupta	Abhilash	Vinod Rathod	
Ajooba	325	"Ek Najoomi Se Poocha"	Laxmikant - Pyarelal		Solo	
Ajooba Kudrat Ka	326	"Dali Gulab Ki Hoon"	Ajit Singh		Solo	
Ajooba Kudrat Ka	327	"Dhitang Dhitang"	Ajit Singh		solo	
Anjali	328	"Ayega"	Illaiyaraaja		Solo	
Badla Junglee Ka	329	"Naujawan Ho Meherban Ho"	Chakravarthy		Amit Kumar	
Badla Junglee Ka	330	"Kisi Ek Nandan Ban Mein"	Chakravarthy		Amit Kumar	
Banjaran	331	"Tere Mere Pyar Ki"	Laxmikant - Pyarelal		Mohd Aziz	
Begunaah	332	"Tere Mere Pyar Ka" (Female)	Rajesh Roshan		Solo	
Benaam Baadshah	333	"Mera Kunwara Padosi"	Laxmikant - Pyarelal		Amit Kumar	
Benaam Baadshah	334	"O Maata Ke Laadle Sojaa"	Laxmikant - Pyarelal		S P Balsubramanium	
Benaam Baadshah	335	"Moochhwale Bachche"	Laxmikant - Pyarelal		Solo	
Bhavishya	336	"Life is Love"		Anand Bakshi	Amit Kumar	
Bhediyon Ka Samooh	337	"Parbat Se Chhan Chhan"	Trina Chakravathy		Gautam Dasgupta	
Dalpati	338	"Ek Aankhon Ka Tu Tara"	Ilaiyaraaja		solo	
Dalpati	339	"Ek Aankhon Ka Tu Tar" (version 2)	Ilaiyaraaja		solo	
Dancer	340	"Diwano Ki Mastano Ki"	Anand - Milind		S P Balsubramanium; Udit Narayan	
Dancer	341	"Yeke Yama Yeke Yama"	Anand - Milind		S P Balsubramanium	
Do Matwale	342	"Main Aaj Bolta Hoon"	Laxmikant - Pyarelal		Mohd Aziz	
Do Matwale	343	"Koi Hai, Hum Hain"	Laxmikant - Pyarelal		Solo	
Fateh	344	"Jaam Hai Shaam Hai"	Naresh Sharma		Annu Malik	
Fateh	345	"Tera Mera Mere Tera Bandhan Hai"	Naresh Sharma		Sukhwinder Singh; Jaishree Shivram; Nilesh Kumar	
First Love Letter	346	"Garjo Re"	Bappi Lahiri		Solo	
Garajna	347	"Bijli Mein Itni Tadap Kahan"	Bappi Lahiri	Indeevar	Solo	
Hatyarin	348	"Saathiya Kya Pilya"	Naresh Sharma		Solo	
Hawai Dhamaka	349	"In Adao Pe Margaya Jaan-E-Jaana"	Sonik - Omi		Udit Narayan	
Hawai Dhamaka	350	"Suhane Geet Gaa Rahi Hai Yeh Payal"	Sonik - Omi		Solo	
House No. 13	351	"Aaja Re Sajna"	Enoch Daniels		Solo	
House No. 13	352	"Kar Liya Hai"	Enoch Daniels		Vinod Rathod	
Hum	353	"Jumma Chumma De De"	Laxmikant - Pyarelal		Sudesh Bhosle	
Hum	354	"Le le Chumma le Le"	Laxmikant - Pyarelal	Laxmikant - Pyarelal	Solo	
Inspector Kiron	355	Tum Sharabi Ho	Bappi Lahiri		Solo	
Izzat	356	"Izzat Se Jeena" (Part 2)	Annu Malik		Shabbir Kumar; Padma Menon; Shraddha Agarwal	
Jaan Pehchan	357	"Bahaaron Mein Nazaaron Mein"	Iqbal Gill		Shabbir Kumar	
Jaan Pehchan	358	"Mujhko Mohabbat Hai Tumse"	Iqbal Gill		Solo	
Jungle Queen	359	"O Meri Jungle Queen"			Udit Narayan	
Kasam Kali Ki	360	"Jhansi Na Chale Jaiyo"	Kamalkant		Solo	
Kasam Kali Ki	361	"Tu Lakh Jatan"	Kamalkant		Solo	
Khatra	362	"Main Hu Kali Aana Na Meri Gali"	Aadesh Shrivastava		Solo	
Khatra	363	"Bombay Ke Mausam Mein"	Aadesh Shrivastava		Solo	
Khilaaf	364	"Aaja Sanam Meri"	Laxmikant - Pyarelal		Solo	
Khilaaf	365	"Hum Jitni Baar Jeeyenge"	Laxmikant - Pyarelal		Suresh Wadkar	
Khoon Ka Karz	366	"Mujhe Maar Kar Meri Jaan"	Laxmikant - Pyarelal		Solo	
Lahu Luhan	367	"Jism Ki Aanch Se"	Anand - Milind		Solo	
Maa	368	"Chanda Mein Chandni"	Annu Malik		Kumar Sanu	
Mast Kalander	369	"Tu Meri Diwani"	Laxmikant - Pyarelal		Mohd Aziz	
Mast Kalander	370	"My Name Is Pinkoo"	Laxmikant - Pyarelal		Sudesh Bhosle	
Meethi Meethi Raaten	371	"Ang Ang Mera"	Sonik-Omi		solo	
Milan Ki Aag	372	"Tu Ne Humein Pyar Se Yun Pukara"	Ravindra Jain		Suresh Wadkar	
Naamcheen	373	"Lift Band Thi"	Annu Malik		Annu Malik	
Narasimha	374	"Pakad Pakad Khinch Ke"	Laxmikant - Pyarelal		Sudesh Bhosle; Jolly Mukharjee; Johnny Lever	
Numbri Aadmi	375	"Kaanon Mein Kehne Wali Hai Jo"	Bappi Lahiri		Amit Kumar	
Numbri Aadmi	376	"Aaj Naach Naach Ke"	Bappi Lahiri		Anupama Deshpande; Sapna Mukharjee	
Paap Ki Aandhi	377	"Tera Kya Kehna"	Laxmikant - Pyarelal		Amit Kumar	
Parakrami	378	"Gunaahon Ki"	Laxmikant-Pyarelal	Anjaan	Amit Kumar	
Parakrami	379	"Neta Ki Sawari Hai"	Laxmikant-Pyarelal	Anjaan	Amit Kumar	
Patthar Ke Insaan	380	"Suraj Naache"	Bappi Lahiri		Solo	
Pehli Mohabbat	381	"Meri Saans Saans"	Kanakraj		Kumar Sanu	
Pehli Mohabbat	382	"Dil Bhool Nahi Sakta"	Kanakraj		Kumar Sanu	
Phool Bane Angaray	383	"Naina Ho Gaye Banwre"	Bappi Lahiri		Sudesh Bhosle	
Prahaar	384	"Hamari Hi Mutthi Mein" (Part II)	Laxmikant - Pyarelal		Solo	
Prem Jung	385	"Sawan Kis Is Mausam Mein"	Hamsalekha		Kumar Sanu	
Prem Jung	386	"Bombbat Bombbat"	Hamsalekha		Kumar Sanu	
Prem Jung	387	"Dance Baby Dance Dance"	Hamsalekha		Abhijeet	
Prem Jung	388	"Yoga Yoga"	Hamsalekha		Kumar Sanu	
Prem Jung	389	"Pyar Hua Jane Do"	Hamsalekha		Udit Narayan	
Prem Qaidi	390	"I Live for You"	Anand - Milind	Sameer	S P Balsubramanium	
Prem Qaidi	391	"Tere In Galon Pe"	Anand - Milind	Sameer	S P Balsubramanium	
Prem Qaidi	392	"Hum Hain Prem Qaidi"	Anand - Milind	Sameer	S P Balsubramanium	
Prem Qaidi	393	"Arey Logon Zara Dekho"	Anand - Milind	Sameer	S P Balsubramanium	
Prem Qaidi	394	"Antakshree"	Anand - Milind	Sameer	S P Balsubramanium	
Princess from Kathmandu	395	"Rang Tere Galon Ka Gulabi"	Ravindra Jain	Ravindra Jain	Suresh Wadkar	
Princess from Kathmandu	396	"Oof Yeh Barfili Hava"	Ravindra Jain	Ravindra Jain	Suresh Wadkar	
Princess from Kathmandu	397	"Kali Hun Mein"	Ravindra Jain	Ravindra Jain	Suresh Wadkar	
Princess from Kathmandu	398	"Kal Tak Ghutan Si Bhari" (duet)	Ravindra Jain	Ravindra Jain	Suresh Wadkar	
Princess from Kathmandu	399	"Kal Tak Ghutan Si Bhari Zindagi"	Ravindra Jain	Ravindra Jain	solo	
Princess from Kathmandu	400	"Kab Se Nihare Tera Rasta"	Ravindra Jain	Ravindra Jain	Solo	
Pucca Badmash	401	"Maan Jao Na Maan"	Usha Khanna		Vinod Rathod	
Pyaar Ka Saudagar	402	"Na Na Na Mere"	Bappi Lahiri		Solo	
Pyar Ka Devta	403	"Main Naazukdil Shehzaadi"	Laxmikant - Pyarelal		Solo	
Pyar Ka Devta	404	"Behnen Hansti Hain to" (Happy)	Laxmikant - Pyarelal		Alka Yagnik; Mohd Aziz	
Pyar Ka Devta	405	"Behnen Hansti Hain to" (Sad)	Laxmikant - Pyarelal		Alka Yagnik; Mohd Aziz	
Ramgarh Ke Sholay	407	"Teri Zulfon Shaam Se Roshan"	Annu Malik		Kumar Sanu	
Ramgarh Ke Sholay	408	"Rapat Rola Maat Karo"	Annu Malik		Kumar Sanu	
Ramwati	409	"Naam Hai Mera Ramwati"	Usha Khanna		Solo	
Ramwati	410	"Le Ja Chudi Balam Khush Hoga"	Usha Khanna			Solo
Ranbhoomi	411	"Pee Kar Shankar Jee Ki Booti"	Laxmikant - Pyarelal		Amit Kumar	
Roohani Taaqat	412	"Baaje Meri Dafli"	Naresh Sharma	Sameer	Shabbir Kumar	
Saanson Ki Sargam	413	"Aap Dil Mein Hamare"	S Surendra		Solo	
Sanam Bewafa	414	"Angoor Ka Dana Hoon"	Mahesh - Kishore		Solo	
Sapnon Ka Mandir	415	"Jo Main Chhup Jaoon"	Laxmikant - Pyarelal		Mohd Aziz	
Saudagar	416	"Ilu Ilu"	Laxmikant - Pyarelal		Sukhwinder Singh; Manhar Udhas	
Saudagar	417	"Mohabbat Ki Ki"	Laxmikant - Pyarelal		Suresh Wadkar	
Saudagar	418	"Saudagar Sauda Kar"	Laxmikant - Pyarelal		Manhar Udhas; Sukhwinder Singh	
Secret Agent Raja	419	"L Yane O Yane"	Illaiyaraaja		Kumar Sanu	
Secret Agent Raja	420	"Naach Baby Naach Tu"	Illaiyaraaja		Kumar Sanu	
Secret Agent Raja	421	"Ek Do Teen"	Illaiyaraaja		Kumar Sanu	
Secret Agent Raja	422	"Arre Baba Arre Baba"	Illaiyaraaja		Kumar Sanu	
Secret Agent Raja	423	"Aao Milne Itbaar Ko"	Illaiyaraaja		Kumar Sanu	
Shikari	424	"Duniya Mein Kitne Watan"	Annu Malik		Anuradha Paudwal; Mohd Aziz	
Shiva Dada	425	"O Dilruba"	Ravindra Jain		Suresh Wadkar	
Shiva Dada	426	"Meri Duilruba Aa Khullam Khulla"	Ravindra Jain		Suresh Wadkar	
Shiva Dada	427	"Honeymoon Pe Chalenge"	Ravindra Jain		Suresh Wadkar	
Shiva Dada	428	"Pyar Ka Mein Pyasa"	Ravindra Jain		Suresh Wadkar	
Shiva Dada	429	"Chandni Meri Tu"	Ravindra Jain		Suresh Wadkar	
Swarg Jaisaa Ghar	430	"Jalte Badan Ki Aag"	Bappi Lahiri	Majrooh Sultanpuri	Solo	
Trinetra	431	"Talk of the Town"			Solo	
Vasna	432	"Mujhe Kuch Kuch Hota Hai"	Ajay Swamy		Solo	
Vishnu Devaa	433	"Aa Gayee Aa Gayee Hichki Yaaron"	Rajesh Roshan		Mangal Singh	
Yaara Dildara	434	"Bin Tere Sanam"	Jatin - Lalit	Majrooh Sultanpuri	Udit Narayan	
Yaara Dildara	435	"Woh Jo Kaha Tha Maine"	Jatin - Lalit	Majrooh Sultanpuri	Udit Narayan	
Yaara Dildara	436	"Koi Chaahe Na Chaahey"	Jatin - Lalit	Majrooh Sultanpuri	Nitin Mukesh	
Yaara Dildara	437	"Bin Tere Sanam" [Remix]	Jatin - Lalit	Majrooh Sultanpuri	Udit Narayan	
Yeh Aag Kab Bujhegi	438	"My Name Is Kitty"	Ravindra Jain		Jolly Mukharjee	

=== 1992 ===
Film	No	Song	Composer(s)	Co-artist(s)
101 Days	440	"Pi Ka Naam"	Raam Laxman	Solo
Aaj Ki Taaqat	441	"Jaan Meri Jaanu"	Bappi Lahiri	Bappi Lahiri
Aaj Ki Taaqat	442	"Hello Hello Hello Inspector"	Bappi Lahiri	Solo
Aarya	443	"Man Ka Mayura"	Kailash Pradyuman	Solo
Aasmaan Se Gira	444	"Ghar Janam Ghar Janam"	Louis Banks	Suresh Wadkar; Shailendra Singh
Abhi Abhi	445	"Raat Hone Lagi"	Anand - Milind	Abhijeet
Anaam	446	"Mein Hoon Ek Shama"	Nadeem - Shravan	Solo
Angaar	447	"Chal Aage Aur Dekh"	Laxmikant - Pyarelal	Sudesh Bhosle
Anjaane Log	448	"Aayi Poonam Ki Raat"	Jagdish J	Sushil Kumar
Baaz	449	"Deewana Meri Jaan"	Anand - Milind	Amit Kumar
Baaz	450	"Saat Sau Khidki"	Anand - Milind	Solo
Bahu Beta Aur Maa	"Gora Rang Yeh"	Surinder Kohli	Shabbir Kumar	
Balwaan	451	"Kya Cheez Yeh Mohabbat"	Mahesh - Kishore	Kumar Sanu
Balwaan	452	"Umar Hai Solah"	Mahesh - Kishore	Solo
Basanti Tangewali	453	"Peekar Shankarji Ka Pyala"	Dilip Sen - Sameer Sen	Solo
Basanti Tangewali	454	"Shama Ban Ke Jalti Hoon"	Dilip Sen - Sameer Sen	Anupama Deshpande
Benaam Rishte	455	"Chhalkihain Aaankhe"	Sukhwinder Singh	Nitin Mukesh
Benaam Rishte	456	"Sapno Se Pure"	Sukhwinder Singh	Solo
Bol Radha Bol	457	"Hawa Sard Hai"	Anand - Milind	Abhijeet
Bol Radha Bol	458	"Deewana Dil Beqarar Tha"	Anand - Milind	Abhijeet
Bombay Ka Raja	459	"Lo Dekho Aa Gaya" (Female)	Rajesh Roshan	Solo
Captain Prabhakar	460	"Dil Naache Dil Jhoome"	Illaiyaraaja	Mohd Aziz
Captain Prabhakar	461	"Yeh Dil Qurbaan"	Illaiyaraaja	Solo
Daisy	462	"Sun Mere Jaane Jahan"	Kailash Pradyuman	S P Balsubramanium
Daisy	463	"Yeh Mausam Yeh Badal"	Kailash Pradyuman	S P Balsubramanium
Daulat Kee Jung	464	"Hai Daiya Jhumke Ki"	Anand - Milind	Solo
Dil Aashna Hai	465	"Ho Abhi Ro Hui Jawan"	Anand–Milind	solo
Dil Aashna Hai	466	"Bhool Ke Din"	Anand–Milind	Sudesh Bhosle; Sadhana Sargam; Abhijeet; Balbinder; Padmini Roy
Dil Aashna Hai	467	"Rangeen Haseen Raat Ho"	Anand–Milind	Solo
Dil Aashna Hai	468	"Ek Dil Ek Jaan Ek Hai Hamara" (Part 1)	Anand–Milind	Sadhana Sargam; Aparna Mayekar
Dil Aashna Hai	469	"Ek Dil Ek Jaan Ek Hai Hamara" (Part 2)	Anand–Milind	Sadhana Sargam; Aparna Mayekar
Diwani Jawani	470	"Ku Ku Dont Touch Me"	Jeetu - Tapan	Solo
Drohi	471	"Tan Mein Aag Jaage"	R D Burman	Amit Kumar
Dushman Zamana	472	"Dil Yeh Pukare Aaja Sanam"	Mahesh - Kishore	Solo
Dushman Zamana	473	"Mohabbat Ki Kitabon Mein" (Female)	Mahesh - Kishore	Solo
Ek Ladka Ek Ladki	474	"Phool Yeh Nahin Armaan"	Anand - Milind	Suresh Wadkar
Gajab Tamaasa	475	"Deewana Deewana"	Anand - Milind	Kumar Sanu
Gajab Tamaasa	476	"Ladki Gali Ki" (duet)	Anand - Milind	Kumar Sanu
Gajab Tamaasa	477	"Ladki Gali Ki"	Anand - Milind	Solo
Gajab Tamaasa	478	"Bhooki Bhikaran Hoon Main"	Anand - Milind	Solo
Ganga Bani Shola	479	"Mera Sajanwa"	Dilip Sen - Sameer Sen	Solo
Geet	480	"Aankhon Mera Basa Loon To"	Bappi Lahiri	Mohd Aziz
Tahalka 1992| 481	"Aapka Chehra Aapka Jalwa & Aapka Chehra Aapka Jalwa Version 2 To"||Anu Malik || Kavita Krishnamurthy & Mohd Aziz			
Geet Milan Ke Gaate Rahenge	481	"O Mere Sajan"	Manoj - Mahesh	Vinod Rathod
Geet Milan Ke Gaate Rahenge	482	"O Sajna Mitwa"	Manoj - Mahesh	Solo
Geet Milan Ke Gaate Rahenge	483	"Jhirmir Jhirmir Megha Barse"	Manoj - Mahesh	Solo
Ghar Jamai	484	"Mai Bhi Kisise Pyar Karti Hun"	Anand - Milind	Solo
Giraft	485	"Tik Tik Tik Bole Dil Ki Ghadi"		Solo
Gori	486	"Dekho Na Dekhona"	Enoch Daniels	Solo
Gori	487	"Gori Hain Kalaaiyaan"	Enoch Daniels	Solo
Gori	488	"Haldi Nahin Mehndi Nahi"	Enoch Daniels	Solo
Hayratt	489	"Abdullah Abdullah"	Usha Khanna	Solo
Hayratt	490	"Bacha Bacha Ke"	Usha Khanna	Solo
Heer Ranjha	491	"Ranjha Ranjha Karte Karte"	Laxmikant - Pyarelal	Solo
Heer Ranjha	492	"Yeh Ped Hai Peeple Ka"	Laxmikant - Pyarelal	Mohd Aziz
Honeymoon	493	"Main Aurat Tu Aadmi"	Rajesh Roshan	Mohd Aziz
Humshakal	494	"Kuch Na Socha Na Dekha"	Laxmikant - Pyarelal	Alka Yagnik
Humshakal	"Pinky Meri Jaan Hai"	Mohammed Aziz	Laxmikant - Pyarelal	
Humshakal	"Jam Jam Ke Maar"	Sudesh Bhosle	Laxmikant - Pyarelal	
Indira	495	"Badhai Ho Badhai"	Kamalkant	Sadhana Sargam
Indira	496	"Meri Masti Bhari"	Kamalkant	Annu Malik
Inteha Pyar Ki	497	"Main Na Bhuloonga" (Duet)	Anand - Milind	Suresh Wadkar
Inteha Pyar Ki	498	"Rishta Pyar Ka Na Toote"	Anand - Milind	Udit Narayan
Inteha Pyar Ki	499	"Jaane Se Pehle" (Female)	Anand - Milind	Solo
Inteha Pyar Ki	500	"Duniya Karti Hai Kyon Zid"	Anand - Milind	Solo
Inteha Pyar Ki	501	"Main Shama Hoon"	Anand - Milind	Suresh Wadkar
Jaagruti	502	"Aayega Aayega"	Anand - Milind	Suresh Wadkar; Abhijeet
Jaagruti	503	"Aagaya Aagaya"	Anand - Milind	Suresh Wadkar; Abhijeet
Jaagruti	504	"Hum Saare Bekaar"	Anand - Milind	Abhijeet; Jolly Mukharjee
Jaan Se Pyaara	505	"Chanchal Chandni Mehki Raat Hai"	Anand - Milind	Abhijeet
Jethaa	506	"Bum Bum Shivji Ki Aayee Re Barat"	Kamalkant	Jaspal Singh; Shailendra Singh
Jigar	507	"Aaye Hum Baarati"	Anand - Milind	Kumar Sanu
Jigar	508	"Log Barso Juda Hoke Jeete Hain"	Anand - Milind	Solo
Jungle Ka Beta	509	"Aawaz de Raja"	Shyam - Surender	Solo
Jungle Ka Beta	510	"Pal Bhar Ki"	Shyam - Surender	Solo
Kaal Bhairav	511	"Bheeni Bheeni Khushboo"	Ravindra Jain	Solo
Kal Ki Awaz	512	"Papa Mera Meri Shaan Hai"	Nadeem-Shravan	solo
Kal Ki Awaz	513	"Papa Mera Meri Shaan Hai" (sad)	Nadeem-Shravan	solo
Kamsin	514	"Deewaron Pe Likha Hai"	Mahesh - Kishore	Mohd Aziz
Kamsin	515	"Tera Naam Tera Naam"	Mahesh - Kishore	Mohd Aziz
Kamsin Haseena	516	"Dil Par Kahan Kaboo"	Usha Khanna	Kumar Sanu
Kamsin Haseena	517	"Jeevan Humko Denewale"	Usha Khanna	Udit Narayan
Kamsin Haseena	518	"Mausam Ghadi Ghadi"	Usha Khanna	Solo
Khiladi	519	"Khud Ko Kya Samajhti Hai"	Jatin - Lalit	Abhijeet; Udit Narayan; Sapna Mukharjee
Khuda Gawah	520	"Tu Mujhe Kabool"	Laxmikant - Pyarelal	Mohd Aziz
Khuda Gawah	521	"Rab Ko Yaad Karoon"	Laxmikant - Pyarelal	Mohd Aziz
Khuda Gawah	522	"Main Aisee Cheez Nahin"	Laxmikant - Pyarelal	Mohd Aziz
Kis Mein Kitna Hai Dum	"Mera Naam Hai Champa"	Bappi Lahiri	Anupama Deshpande	
Koyal	523	"Na Dhaga Hai Na Dor"	Bhoopi Ratan	Kumar Sanu
Koyal	524	"Patang Jaisa Hawa Mein"	Bhoopi Ratan	Kumar Sanu
Koyal	525	"Aisi Baten Kabhi"	Bhoopi Ratan	Suresh Wadkar
Koyal	526	"Meri Bagon Ki Koyal"	Bhoopi Ratan	Solo
Koyal	527	"Rab Teri Marzi"'	Bhoopi Ratan	Kumar Sanu
Kundan	528	"Chhan Chhan Baje Ghungroo"	Bappi Lahiri	Mohd Aziz
Lambu Dada	529	"Main Hoon Jawani Ki Bijli"	Rajesh Roshan	Solo
Maa	"Chanda Mein Chandni"	Anu Malik	Kumar Sanu	
Maarg	530	"Ek Shaam Tune"	Anu Malik	Solo
Main Hoon Geeta	531	"Main Hoon Main Hoon Geeta"	Vijay Batalvi	Solo
Main Hoon Sherni	532	"Tu Akeli Hai Lamba Safar"	Anand - Laxman	Mohd Aziz
Mashooq	533	"Kaun Ho Tum"	Shyam - Surender	Abhijeet
Mashooq	534	"Tumhe Dil to de Chuke Hai"	Shyam - Surender	Kumar Sanu
Mashooq	535	"Ye Dharkan Mere Dil Ki"	Shyam - Surender	Kumar Sanu
Mashooq	536	"O Yara"	Shyam - Surender	Kumar Sanu
Mere Meherbaan	537	"Teri Bhi Marzi"	Bappi Lahiri	Mohd Aziz
Mere Sajna Saath Nibhana	538	"Jhoom Jhom Kahta Hai"	Anand - Milind	Udit Narayan
Mohabbat Pehli Nazar Mein	539	"Choti Si Bagiya Mein"	Munawar Ali	Udit Narayan
Mohabbat Pehli Nazar Mein	540	"Choti Si Bagiya Mein" (Sad)	Munawar Ali	Udit Narayan
Muskurahat	541	"Apni Jeb Mein Lakhon Honge"	Raam Laxman	Udit Narayan; M G Shreekumar
My Story	542	"Chalkata Jaam Hai"	Kanakraj	Solo
My Story	543	"Mera Har Khwab"	Kanakraj	Solo
Nagin Aur Lutere	544	"Sun Sun Bhagwan"	Anand - Laxman	Solo
Nagin Aur Lutere	545	"Aao Pyar Karen"	Anand - Laxman	Udit Narayan
Nishchaiy	546	"Kisi Haseen Yaar Ki Talaash Hai"	O P Nayyar	Amit Kumar
Nishchaiy	547	"Sun Mere Sajna"	O P Nayyar	Amit Kumar
Nishchaiy	548	"Nayee Suraahi Taaza Paani"	O P Nayyar	Amit Kumar
Nishchaiy	549	"Dekho Dekho Tum"	O P Nayyar	Amit Kumar
Nishchaiy	550	"Chhutti Chhutti Kar di Meri"	O P Nayyar	Solo
Parasmani	551	"Is Duniya Mein"	Anand - Laxman	Kumar Sanu
Parasmani	552	"Main Hoon Paras"	Anand - Laxman	Sadhana Sargam
Parda Hai Parda	553	"Hey Baby I Love You"	Anand - Milind	Amit Kumar
Police Aur Mujrim	554	"Apni Aankhon Ke Sitaaron Mei"	Bappi Lahiri	Mohd Aziz
Police Aur Mujrim	555	"Mere Mehboob Tujhe"	Bappi Lahiri	Mohd Aziz
Prem Deewane	556	"Prem Deewane"	Laxmikant - Pyarelal	Manhar Udhas
Prem Deewane	557	"Yeh Ho Raha Hai"	Laxmikant - Pyarelal	Sachin
Prem Deewane	558	"Mohabbat Zindabad"	Laxmikant - Pyarelal	Alka Yagnik; Udit Narayan; Mohd Aziz
Pyaar Ka Samander	559	"Jawani Jawani Jawani"	Dilip Sen - Sameer Sen	Solo
Pyar Bhara Khat	560	"Aankahe Aankahe"	Krishandu Das	Solo
Pyar Bhara Khat	561	"Main Khat Likhta"	Krishandu Das	Mohd Aziz
Pyar Hua Chori Chori	562	"Ja Re Jao - Besharam Chanda"	Laxmikant - Pyarelal	Amit Kumar
Pyar Hua Chori Chori	563	"Yaar Chahiye"	Triveni - Bhawani	Usha Mangeshkar
Pyar Hua Chori Chori	564	"Aao Na Aao Na"	Triveni - Bhawani	Solo
Qaid Mein Hai Bulbul	565	"Main Baagon Ki Bulbul"	Anand - Milind	Suresh Wadkar
Qaid Mein Hai Bulbul	566	"Hakeem Tarachand Zara"	Anand - Milind	Solo
Qaid Mein Hai Bulbul	567	"Kitna Lamba Bijli Ka Khamba"	Anand - Milind	Suresh Wadkar
Ramayan	568	"Janani Hum Ramdoot Hanuman" (Sanskrit)	Vanraj Bhatia	Vinod Rathod
Ramayan	569	"Ban Upvan" (Sanskrit)	Vanraj Bhatia	
Ramayan	570	"Nirjhar Jal" (Sanskrit)	Vanraj Bhatia	Suresh Wadkar
Ramayan	571	"Ram Tumhari Sita"	Vanraj Bhatia	Hariharan
Ramayan	572	"Sumiran Karle"	Vanraj Bhatia	Solo
Ramayan	573	"Sumiran Karle" (part 2)	Vanraj Bhatia	Solo
Rishta Ho to Aisa	574	"Dilbar Ho Sanam Ho"	Laxmikant - Pyarelal	Suresh Wadkar
Rishte Ki Deewar	575	"Dukh Beete Sukh Agaya"	Manna Dey	Manna Dey
Rishte Ki Deewar	576	"Aisa Raj Humko Bharat Men" (Female)	Manna Dey	Solo
Sachcha Pyar	577	"Mein Na Bolungi"	Anand - Milind	Solo
Sachcha Pyar	578	"Tujhe Dekh Ke"	Anand - Milind	Udit Narayan
Sahebzaade	579	"Mera Long Kho Gaya"	Laxmikant - Pyarelal	solo
Sahebzaade	580	"Jai Maata Jai Maata"	Laxmikant - Pyarelal	Amit Kumar
Sahebzaade	581	"Maata Teri Daya Ka"	Laxmikant - Pyarelal	Solo
Seeta Salma Suzy	582	Ae Chiragon Tum Andheron Ko	Anwar - Usman	Solo
Seeta Salma Suzy	583	"Na Tan Bechte Hain Na"	Anwar - Usman	Solo
Shola Aur Shabnam	584	Jane de Jane De	Bappi Lahiri	Amit Kumar
Shola Aur Shabnam	585	"Too Pagal Premi Awaara"	Bappi Lahiri	Shabbir Kumar
Sone Ki Lanka	586	"Sar Pe Topi Kali"	Anand - Milind	Mohd Aziz
Sone Ki Lanka	587	"Jeene Ko Marne Ka"	Anand - Milind	Amit Kumar
Sone Ki Lanka	588	"Maine Pee Tune Pee"	Anand - Milind	Sapna Mukherjee
Sone Ki Zanjeer	589	"Arey O Jane Jana"	Anand - Milind	S P Balsubramanium
Suraj Ka Satvan Ghoda	"Yeh Shaamein Sab Ki Sab"	Vanraj Bhatia	Vasant Dev	Udit Narayan
Suryavanshi	590	Mujhe Sadiyon Se Tera	Anand - Milind	Solo
Suryavanshi	591	"Yeh Log Poochhte Hain"	Anand - Milind	Udit Narayan
Swarg Se Pyara Ghar Hamara	592	"Jalte Badan Ki Aag"	Laxmikant - Pyarelal	Wasi Raza
Swarg Se Pyara Ghar Hamara	593	"Kitna Pyara Hai"	Laxmikant - Pyarelal	Mohd Aziz
Tilak	594	"Inhi Logo Ne Liya Dupatta" (Parody)	Anand - Milind	Solo
Tilak	595	"Dil Pe Qayamat Dhaye"	Bappi Lahiri	Mohd Aziz
Vansh	596	"Yaar Mere Pyar Karo"	Anand - Milind	Solo
Yaad Rakhegi Duniya	597	"Tooti Khidki Makdi Ka Jangal"	Anand - Milind	Amit Kumar
Yalgaar	598	Teri Chunni Pe Sitare"	Channi Singh	Udit Narayan
Yalgaar	599	"Kaun Si Baat Hai"	Channi Singh	Udit Narayan
Yalgaar	600	"Koi Pichhle Janam Kiye"	Channi Singh	Udit Narayan
Yeh Raat Phir Na Aayegi	601	"Tu Bhi Tu I Love You"	Rajesh Roshan	Mohd Aziz
Yudhpath	602	"O I Love You"	Dilip Sen - Sameer Sen	Kumar Sanu
Zulm Ki Hukumat	604	"O Dilruba"	Dilip Sen - Sameer Sen	Solo
Zulm Ki Hukumat	605	"Yahan Zulm Ki Hukumat Hai"	Dilip Sen - Sameer Sen	Solo

=== 1993 ===
Film	No	Song	Composer(s)	Co-artist(s)
Aadmi	606	"Dil Tere Naam Se"	Jatin–Lalit	Kumar Sanu
Aadmi	607	"Main Aashiq Hun"	Jatin–Lalit	Jolly Mukharjee
Aadmi	608	"Dingora Dingora"	Jatin–Lalit	Solo
Aadmi	609	"Dhak Dhak Dil Mera"	Jatin–Lalit	Kumar Sanu
Aag Ka Toofan	610	"Saajan Humka Heroine"	Bappi Lahiri	solo
Aag Ka Toofan	611	"Band Kamrein Mein"	Bappi Lahiri	solo
Aaj Kie Aurat	612	"Hello Hello Inspector"	Bappi Lahiri	solo
Aakhri Chetawani	613	"Aaire Aaire Mujhpe Jawani Aaj"	Shrikant Niwaskar	Solo
Aankhen	614	"O Lal Dupatte Wali"	Bappi Lahiri	Alka Yagnik; Kumar Sanu; Sudesh Bhosle
Aasoo Bane Angarey	615	"Diwane Yeh Ladke"	Rajesh Roshan	Amit Kumar
Anari Dada	616	"Khul Gaya Re Ghul Gaya Re"	Sonik - Omi	Sonu Nigam; Chorus
Anari Dada	617	"Dekha Hai Jabse Tujhko"	Sonik - Omi	Sonu Nigam; Chorus
Anari Dada	618	"Pyar Karko Lovely"	Sonik - Omi	Sonu Nigam; Chorus
Anari Dada	619	"Gali Gali Kanwara"	Sonik - Omi	Sonu Nigam; Chorus
Andha Insaaf	620	"Meri Yeh Jawani"	Illaiyaraaja	Sudesh Bhosle
Andha Insaaf	621	"Yeh Jo Raat Aayee Hai Yaara"	Illaiyaraaja	Mohd Aziz
Andha Intaquam	622	"Bhigi Bhigi Raaton Mein"	Shreerang Aaras	Abhijeet
Andha Intaquam	623	"I Love You"	Shreerang Aaras	Abhijeet
Ashaant	624	"Bheege Bheege Jo Sawan"	Jatin - Lalit	Solo
Ashaant	625	"Hum to Sanam Sadiyon Se"	Jatin - Lalit	Abhijeet
Ashaant	626	"Dil Ki Ghadi Are Ghadi Ghadi"	Jatin - Lalit	Kumar Sanu
Badi Behan	627	"Bewafa Humko"	Laxmikant - Pyarelal	Mohd Aziz
Bedardi	628	"Sun O Bedardi"	Laxmikant - Pyarelal	Illa Arun
Begunaah	629	"Tere Mere Pyaar Ka" (female)	Rajesh Roshan	Solo
Bhagyawan	630	"Gaadi Chali Baroda Se"	Anand - Milind	Solo
Bhookamp	631	"1 2 3 4 Dil Pe Na Chale Zor"	Jatin - Lalit	Kumar Sanu
Bomb Blast	632	"Lena Hai Lena Hai"	Bappi Lahiri	Bali Bramhabhatt
Bomb Blast	633	"Mujhe Jeene Nahin Deti"	Bappi Lahiri	Mohd Aziz
Bomb Blast	634	"Badra Jab Chaye"	Bappi Lahiri	Solo
Bomb Blast	635	"Taka Taki Hui II"	Bappi Lahiri	Solo
Boy Friend	636	"I Am Your Boyfriend"	Jatin - Lalit	Kumar Sanu
Boy Friend	637	"Yeh Ghadi Yeh Pal Yeh Baatein"	Jatin - Lalit	Abhijeet
Boy Friend	638	"Yoon Na Mujshe Rootho Ji"	Jatin - Lalit	Solo
Chandra Mukhi	639	"Teri Hi Aarzoo Hai"'	Anand - Milind	S P Balsubramanium
Chandra Mukhi	640	"Mere Hothon Pe Ek Kahani"	Anand - Milind	Anand Chitragupt
Chandra Mukhi	641	"Aa Paas Aa"	Anand - Milind	S P Balsubramanium
Chandra Mukhi	642	"Maine Pilayee Ki Tune Pilayee"	Anand - Milind	S P Balsubramanium
Dalaal	643	" Chori Chori Maine Bhi To"	Bappi Lahiri	Kumar Sanu
Darr	644	" Solah Button Meri Choli"	Shiv - Hari	Lata Mangeshkar; Pamela Chopra
Dhanwaan	645	"Rang di Rang Di"	Anand - Milind	Suresh Wadkar; Nitin Mukesh
Dhanwaan	646	"Bolo Bolo Main Hoon"	Anand - Milind	S P Balsubramanium
Dhanwaan	647	"O Saahiba O Saahiba"	Anand - Milind	Sadhana Sargam; S P Balsubramanium
Dhanwaan	648	"Ek Hi Ghonsla Do Dilon Ka"	Anand - Milind	Sadhana Sargam; S P Balsubramanium
Dharam Ka Insaaf	649	"Maikhana Maikhana"	Sukhwinder Singh	Solo
Dil Apna Aur Preet Paraee	650	"Kyon Rooth Ke Tum"	Usha Khanna	Kumar Sanu
Dil Hai Betaab	651	"Pehle Pyar Ki Pehli Yeh Barsaat Hai"	Laxmikant - Pyarelal	Udit Narayan
Dil Hai Betaab	652	"Har Pal Mere Hothon Par"	Laxmikant - Pyarelal	Udit Narayan
Dil Ne Ikraar Kiya	653	"Tilu Timati Tilu Tilu"	Annu Malik	Abhijeet
Do Phool Hazaar Kante	654	"Mujhko Sanam Kasam Hai"	Anil Jaswant	Shekhar
Do Phool Hazaar Kante	655	"Aai Nazaneen Aaye Haseen"	Anil Jaswant	Shekhar
Dosti Ki Saugandh	656	" Diwano Mein Kya Josh"	Surinder Kohli	Solo
Ek Hi Raasta	657	"Aankh Mere Yaar Ki Dukhe" (Duet)	Mahesh - Kishore	Pankaj Udhas
Game	658	"Deva Ganpati"	Anand - Milind	Solo
Geetanjali	659	"Pyar Ke Rishtey"	Bappi Lahiri	Kumar Sanu
Geetanjali	660	"Badra Chaye"	Bappi Lahiri	Solo
Geetanjali	661	"Bina Tumhare Char Kadam"	Bappi Lahiri	Kumar Sanu
Gumrah	662	Yeh Zindagi Ka Sagar	Laxmikant - Pyarelal	Talat Aziz
Gunaah	663	"Jani Jani Jani Mar Jaoge"	Rajesh Roshan	Solo
Hairaan	664	"Aadhi Raat Mein"	M M Keeravani	Suresh Wadkar
Hairaan	665	"Paisa Woh Hai"	M M Keeravani	Vinod Rathod
Hairaan	666	"Hum Se Bhi Zara Dil Laga"	M M Keeravani	Vinod Rathod
Hairaan	667	"Chali Thand Hawa"	M M Keeravani	Suresh Wadkar
Hairaan	668	"Hum Yaar Tere Hai"	M M Keeravani	Vinod Rathod
Hum Anaree Hain	669	" Band Kamre Mein"	Anand - Milind	Solo
Insaniyat Ke Devta	670	"Tan Bheeg Gaya"	Anand - Milind	Udit Narayan
Insaniyat Ke Devta	671	"Shaadi Rachayenge"	Anand - Milind	Mohd Aziz
Ishq Aur Inteqam	672	"Meri Jan Na Mujhse Hona Khafa" (duet)	Bhoopi Ratan	Kumar Sanu
Ishq Aur Inteqam	673	"Meri Jan Na Mujhse Hona Khafa"	Bhoopi Ratan	Solo
Jaan Pe Khelkar	674	"Jaan Pe Khel Kar"	Ravindra Jain	Shabbir Kumar
Jaan Pe Khelkar	675	"Jaan Pe Khel Kar 2"	Ravindra Jain	Solo
Kala Coat	676	"Hum Tau Naino Se Karte Hain Vaar"	Iqbal Gill	Anuradha Paudwal
Kasam Teri Kasam	677	"Parody"	Amar - Utpal	Anuradha Paudwal; Babla Mehta; Sudesh Bhosle; Kavita Paudwal; Sonu Nigam
Kaydaa Kanoon	678	"Pawan Basanti Bahane Lagi"	Anand - Milind	Suresh Wadkar
Khal Nayak	679	"Khal Nayak Hun Main"	Laxmikant - Pyarelal	Vinod Rathod
Khal Nayak	680	"Khal Nayak Hai Tu"	Laxmikant - Pyarelal	Illa Arun
Khal-Naaikaa	681	"Kisi Ki Premika Banke"	Mahesh - Kishore	Sadhana Sargam
Khal-Naaikaa	682	"Mere Mehboob Se Militi Hai"	Mahesh - Kishore	Solo
Kohra	683	"Mausam Rangeen Hai"	Charanjit Ahuja	Kumar Sanu
Kshatriya	684	"Dil Na Kisika Jaaye"	Laxmikant - Pyarelal	Lata Mangeshkar
Kshatriya	685	"Main Ek Pyaasi Kali"	Laxmikant - Pyarelal	Solo
Kshatriya	686	"Chham Chham Barso Paani"	Laxmikant - Pyarelal	Sadhana Sargam
Kshatriya	687	"Tune Kiya Tha Vaada"	Laxmikant - Pyarelal	Solo
Kshatriya	688	"Sapne Mein Sakhi	Laxmikant - Pyarelal	Solo
Miya Biwi Aur Saali (Dubbed)	689	"Hont Tere Yeh Gaal Tere"	M. M. Kreem	Udit Narayan
Miya Biwi Aur Saali (Dubbed)	690	"Tere Aankhen Tera Kaajal"	M. M. Kreem	Kumar Sanu
Muhafiz (In Custody)	691	"Raaze Ulfat"	Zakir Hussain; Ustad Sultan Khan	Solo
Muhafiz (In Custody)	692	"Ae Jazbae Dil"	Zakir Hussain; Ustad Sultan Khan	Solo
Parampara	693	"Naujawanon Ka Zamana Hai"	Shiv - Hari	Anupama Deshpande; Vinod Rathod; Samir Date
Parwane	694	"Jee Chahata Hai Tujhe Kiss Karoon"	Anand - Milind	Kumar Sanu
Parwane	695	"Jis Baat Se Darte The"	Anand - Milind	Udit Narayan
Parwane	696	"Dank Maare Bichuwa Jawani Ka"	Anand - Milind	Poornima
Pehchaan	697	"Aankhon Mein Kya"	Anand - Milind	Abhijeet
Pehchaan	698	"Sanam O Sanam"	Anand - Milind	Abhijeet
Pehchaan	699	"Aankhon Mein Kya"	Anand - Milind	Abhijeet
Phool	700	"Saal Ke Baarah"	Anand - Milind	Udit Narayan
Phool	701	"Title Song"	Anand - Milind	Udit Narayan
Phoolan Hasina Ramkali	702	"Mera Naam Hai Phoolan Rani"	Dilip Sen - Sameer Sen	Alka Yagnik, Sadhana Sargam
Platform	703	"Is Baat Ka Bahana Achcha Hai"	Anand - Milind	solo
Professor Ki Padosan	704	"Main Hoon Tu Hai Aur"	R D Burman	Sudesh Bhosle
Professor Ki Padosan	705	"Aisi Jaldi Bhi Kya Hai"	R D Burman	Alka Yagnik
Rampur Ka Raja	706	"God Mein Sir Rakh Ke"	Illaiyaraaja	Udit Narayan
Rampur Ka Raja	707	"Kanya Kumari"	Illaiyaraaja	Udit Narayan
Rampur Ka Raja	708	"Kya Hua Kuch Hua"	Illaiyaraaja	Udit Narayan
Rani Aur Maharani	709	"Wallah Wallah Vai Vai"	Jeetu - Tapan	Solo
Roop Ki Rani Choron Ka Raja	710	"Jaanewale Zara Ruk Jaa"	Laxmikant - Pyarelal	Vinod Rathod
Roop Ki Rani Choron Ka Raja	711	"Parda Utha"	Laxmikant - Pyarelal	Amit Kumar
Roop Ki Rani Choron Ka Raja	712	"Chai Mein Chini"	Laxmikant - Pyarelal	Amit Kumar
Roop Ki Rani Choron Ka Raja	713	"Dushman Dilka Jo"	Laxmikant - Pyarelal	Solo
Roop Ki Rani Choron Ka Raja	714	"Main Ek Sone Ki Moorat Hoon"	Laxmikant - Pyarelal	Amit Kumar
Roop Ki Rani Choron Ka Raja	715	"Main Hoon Roop Ki"	Laxmikant - Pyarelal	Solo
Sangraam	716	"Bheegi Hui Raat"	Nadeem - Shravan	Kumar Sanu
Shreemaan Aashique	717	"Is Se Jyada Dukh Na Koi"	Nadeem - Shravan	solo
Sir	718	"Bund Hoton Se"	Annu Malik	Solo
Sir	719	"Odh Ke Andhere"	Annu Malik	Solo
Sir	720	"Aaj Hum Ne Dil Ka"	Annu Malik	Kumar Sanu
Suraj Ka Satwan Ghoda	721	"Yeh Shamen"	Vanraj Bhatia	Udit Narayan
Tahqiqaat	722	"Tu Kisi Aur Se Milne Ke Bahane" (Female)	Annu Malik	Solo
Tahqiqaat	723	"Mujhko Mela to Dikhla De"	Annu Malik	Solo
Tiranga	724	"Oye Rabba Meri Jaan Bachale"	Laxmikant - Pyarelal	Mohd Aziz
Tiranga	725	"Aaj Ki Shaam Pyar Karne Walo Ke Naam"	Laxmikant - Pyarelal	Mohd Aziz
Veertaa	726	"Badhai Ho Badhai"	Bappi Lahiri	Alka Yagnik
Waqt Hamara Hai	727	"Haanji Haan Maaf Karna"	Nadeem - Shravan	Alka Yagnik; Anupam Kher
Waqt Ka Sikandar	728	"Hum Dum Humsafar"	Sharda	Shabbir Kumar
Waqt Ka Sikandar	729	"Haye Main Mar Gai"	Sharda	Solo
Yugandhar	730	"Krishna Aayega"	Laxmikant - Pyarelal	Amit Kumar
Yugandhar	731	"Naale Naale Main Chala"	Laxmikant - Pyarelal	Amit Kumar

=== 1994 ===
Film	No	Song	Composer(s)	Co-artist(s)
1942: A Love Story	732	"Pyar Hua Chupke Se"	R D Burman	Solo
1942: A Love Story	733	"Rim Jhim Rim Jhim"	R D Burman	Kumar Sanu
Aa Gale Lag Jaa	734	"Aa Gale Lag Jaa"	Annu Malik	Solo
Aa Gale Lag Jaa	735	"Aaj Hamen Maloom Hua"	Annu Malik	Kumar Sanu
Aag Aur Chingari	736	"Meri Umar Hai Solah"	Bappi Lahiri	Solo
Aag Aur Chingari	737	"Yeh Jawani Hai Meri"	Bappi Lahiri	Solo
Aaja Mere Mehboob	738	"Hilori Hilori Uthe"	S G Varma	Solo
Aaja Mere Mehboob	739	"Saawan Ke Jhoole"	S G Varma	
Aap Se Hai Pyar	740	"Wada Kiya Tha"	Kanu Bhattacharya; B K Raja	Solo
Aashiq	741	"Kyoon Dil Choora Rahi Ho"	Aadesh Shrivastava	Babul Supriyo
Amaanat	742	"Ho Gaya Ji"	Bappi Lahiri	Kumar Sanu
Andaz	743	"Lelo Lelo Mera Imtihaan"	Bappi Lahiri	Kumar Sanu
Andaz	744	"Main Maal Gaadi"	Bappi Lahiri	Vinod Rathod
Andhera	745	"Pori Kahun"	Dilip Dutta	Kumar Sanu
Andhera	746	"Komda Komdi Chokra"	Dilip Dutta	Jolly Mukharjee
Andhera	747	"Tere Liye Pyar Ki Bahaar"	Dilip Dutta	Solo
Anokha Prem Yudh	748	"Pyar Karne Wale"	Manoj Saran	Udit Narayan
Anokha Prem Yudh	749	"Chehra Hai Lal Gulab"	Manoj Saran	Abhijeet
Anth	750	Aaja Jane Ja	Anand - Milind	Abhijeet
Anth	751	"Jane Ja Dil Na Jala"	Anand - Milind	Kumar Sanu
Beta Ho to Asia	752	"Raat Muradowali"	Ravindra Jain	Mohammed Aziz
Betaaj Badshah	753	"Koi Aashiq to Koi Deewana"	Anand - Milind	Sudesh Bhosle
Brahma	754	"Suno Suno Meri Rani Ji"	Bappi Lahiri	Bappi Lahiri
Chauraha	756	"Ye Kaisa Pyar Hai"	Laxmikant - Pyarelal	Amit Kumar
Cheetah	757	"Ya Habibi Mehbooba Meri Mahjabi"	Jatin - Lalit	Sonu Nigam
Dharam Yoddha	758	"Kangna Kalai Mein"	A R Rahman	Solo
Do Fantoosh	759	"O Balaam Re"	Hari - Arjun	Dilraj Kaur
Eena Meena Deeka	760	"Parody Song"	Anand - Milind	Poornima; Sudesh Bhosle; Jolly Mukharjee
Ek Ka Jawab Do	761	"Mera Dil Dhadake"	Vijay Batalvi	Dilraj Kaur
Fauj	762	"Teri Nazar Ne Humko"	Raam Laxman	Kumar Sanu
Fauj	763	"Tum Ko Choo Ke Kiya Hai"	Raam Laxman	Kumar Sanu
Fauj	764	"Teri Nazar Ne Humko"	Raam Laxman	Kumar Sanu
Gangapur Ki Geeta	767	"Pehen Ke Peela Ghaghara"	Jeetu - Tapan	Solo
Gangapur Ki Geeta	768	"Beimaan Denge"	Jeetu - Tapan	Solo
Gangster	769	"Lachak Lachak Ke"	Jatin - Lalit	Sadhana Sargam; Vijayta Pandit Shrivastava
Gopalaa	770	"Tumhari Kasam	Annu Malik	Kumar Sanu
Gopalaa	771	"Aaj Akeele Mein Hum Dono"	Annu Malik	Kumar Sanu
Gopalaa	772	"Mere Gopala"	Annu Malik	Solo
Ikke Pe Ikka	773	"Sawan Ki Boondein"	Mahesh - Kishore	Vipin Sachdeva
Ikke Pe Ikka	774	"Tera Dekh Ke Roop"	Mahesh - Kishore	Vipin Sachdeva
Ikke Pe Ikka	775	"Maine Likh di Jawan"	Mahesh - Kishore	Vipin Sachdeva
Insaaf Apne Lahoo Se	776	"Jeet Lenge Baazi Haari"	Laxmikant - Pyarelal	Sudesh Bhosle
Insaaf Apne Lahoo Se	777	"Aankhon Mein Saanson Mein"	Laxmikant - Pyarelal	Alka Yagnik; Mohd Aziz
Jaan-E-Tamanna	778	"Soni Kudi Namkeen Badi"	Aadesh Shrivastava	Bali Bramhabhatt
Jai Maa Karwa Chouth	779	"Main Amber Ka Suraj"	C Arjun	Suresh Wadkar
Jai Maa Karwa Chouth	780	"Babul Se Mangai"	C Arjun	Solo
Janam Se Pehle	781	"Aa Bhi Jaa"	R D Burman	Babla Mehta
Janta Ki Adalat	782	"Tum Bhi Pagal"	Bappi Lahiri	Kumar Sanu
Janta Ki Adalat	783	"Koyal Bole"	Bappi Lahiri	Roop Kumar Rrathod
Janta Ki Adalat	784	"Dil Mein Kuchh Aur"	Bappi Lahiri	Kumar Sanu
Juaari	785	"Hara Khiladi Jeet Gaye Hum"	Bappi Lahiri	Abhijeet; Sudesh Bhosle
Juaari	786	"Gali Gali Mein Pani Hai"	Bappi Lahiri	Bappi Lahiri; Vinod Rathod
Karan	787	"Woh Ayega"	Raam Laxman	Sudesh Bhosle
Kaun Apna Kaun Paraya	788	"Hai Tauba Jawani"	Dilip Sen - Sameer Sen	Solo
Laqshya	789	"Tere Bina O Mere"	Jatin - Lalit	Kumar Sanu
Madam X	790	"Main Hoon Chhuri Rampuri"	Annu Malik	Solo
Madhosh	791	Dekho to Jaane Jaana	Anand–Milind	Udit Narayan
Madhosh	792	"Tere Mere Mere Tere"	Anand–Milind	Udit Narayan
Maha Shaktishaali	793	"Main Hosh Mein Nahin Hoon" (Female)	Anand - Milind	Solo
Maine Dil Liya	794	Ghungta Uthake Mere Sajan	M M Keeravani	Udit Narayan
Maine Dil Liya	795	"Pinjre Ke O Paanchi" (duet)	M M Keeravani	Udit Narayan
Maine Dil Liya	796	"Pinjre Ke O Panchi"	M M Keeravani	Solo
Mawali Raaj	797	"Gaal Gulabi Naram Naram"	Bappi Lahiri; A R Rahman	Suresh Wadkar
Mawali Raaj	798	"Ola Ola O"	Bappi Lahiri; A R Rahman	Suresh Wadkar
Mawali Raaj	799	"Ghumte Ghumte Duniya Mein"	Bappi Lahiri; A R Rahman	Suresh Wadkar
Mawali Raaj	800	"Raat Ka Ek Baja"	Bappi Lahiri; A R Rahman	Suresh Wadkar
Mawali Raaj	801	"Tun Tun Tun"	Bappi Lahiri; A R Rahman	Suresh Wadkar
Mera Pyara Bharat (D)	802	"Ang Ang Jhoome"	Ilaiyaraaja	Sudesh Bhosle
Mera Pyara Bharat (D)	803	"Choli Tang Teri"	Ilaiyaraaja	Sudesh Bhosle
Mohabbat Ki Rail	804	"Tujhe Paa Liya Hai Jabse"	Jagdeesh Rahi	Solo
Mohabbat Ki Rail	805	"Wada Aapna Bhool Na Jana"	Jagdeesh Rahi	Suresh Kumar
Mohabbat Ki Rail	806	"Dil Tujhpe Fidaa"	Jagdeesh Rahi	Solo
Mohini	807	"Chahe Jis Naam Se"	Ravindra Jain	Solo
Mohini	808	"Dahrti Gagan Ko Hilake Rahungi"	Ravindra Jain	Solo
Mohini	809	"Aadha Adhura Nagma Milan Ka"	Ravindra Jain	Suresh Wadkar
Mohini	810	"Gagan Ke Chaman"	Ravindra Jain	Solo
Mohini	811	"Palke Utha Sajna"	Ravindra Jain	Suresh Wadkar
Mohra	812	"Tu Cheez Badi Hai"	Viju Shah	Udit Narayan
Mohra	813	"Main Cheez Badi Hoon"	Viju Shah	Solo
Mr Shrimati	814	"Hum Ko Gussa Aaya"	Babla	Abhijeet
Mr. Azaad	815	"Gilli Bina Aisa Danda"	Bappi Lahiri	Arun Bakshi; Kumar Sanu
Paramaatma	816	"Jai Radhe Radhe"	Bappi Lahiri	Solo
Pathreela Raasta	817	"Choli Aur Ghagra"	Raam Laxman	Udit Narayan
Police Inspector	818	"Aaj Yeh Elaan Kara Do"	Aadesh Shrivastava	Babul Supriyo
Police Inspector	819	"Mila Hai Aapka Jo"	Aadesh Shrivastava	Kumar Sanu
Pyar Ka Rog	820	"Dil Pe Hai Tere Naam"	Bappi Lahiri	Udit Narayan
Qaidi No 36	821	"Rang Birangi Chudiyan"	Bappi Lahiri	Solo
Raja Babu	822	"Aaja Aaja Yaad Sataye"	Anand - Milind	Udit Narayan
Rakhwale	823	"Idhar Shikari Udhar Shikari"	Sonik - Omi	Solo
Sadhna	824	"Toota Hua Mandir Hoon Main"	Bappi Lahiri	Mohd Aziz
Salaami	825	"Mile Tum Se Bichhad Kar Hum"	Nadeem - Shravan	Alka Yagnik; Kumar Sanu
Sangam Hoke Rahega	826	"Main Bewafaa Nahin"	Anand–Milind	Vipin Sachdeva
Sangam Hoke Rahega	827	"Tune Chhua To"	Anand–Milind	solo
Sangdil Sanam	828	"Dharti Bane Dawaat"	Anand - Milind	S P Balsubramanium
Sangdil Sanam	829	"Sanam Sangdil Sanam"	Anand - Milind	Amit Kumar
Shohrat	830	"Too Dum Dum Dhol Bajaa"	Nikhil - Vinay	Udit Narayan
Sholay Aur Toofan	831	Babu Na Karo Ishare	Anand - Laxman	Solo
Sholay Aur Toofan	832	"Sunle Meri O Radha"	Anand - Laxman	Mohd Aziz
Sholay Aur Toofan	833	"Lootere Sun Tu Paapi"	Anand - Laxman	Solo
Swami Vivekananda	834	"Prabhuji More"	Salil Chowdhury	solo
Swami Vivekananda	835	"Tava Virahe Vanamali"	Salil Chowdhury	solo
Taaj Aur Talwaar	836	"Dil Mein Ho Tum"	Bappi Lahiri	Kumar Sanu
Talaashi	837	"Maine Tujhko Pyar Kiya Hai"	Anand - Milind	Solo
Tara Rani Ki Amar Katha	838	"Dekho Aayee Ri"	Sapan - Jagmohan	Solo
Tara Rani Ki Amar Katha	839	"Gori Ka Ang Khila Jaaye"	Sapan - Jagmohan	Solo
Tara Rani Ki Amar Katha	840	"Tu Shktiman Tu Hai Mahan"	Sapan - Jagmohan	Solo
Thanedaarni	841	"Hum Do Premi"	Bappi Lahiri	Mohd Aziz
Thanedaarni	842	"Tum Oh Julmi Saudagar"	Bappi Lahiri	Solo
Udhaar Ki Zindagi	843	"Thodi Hasi Hai to Thode Aasoo"	Anand - Milind	Udit Narayan; Suresh Wadkar
Udhaar Ki Zindagi	844	"Thodi Hasi Hai to Thode Aasoo" (duet)	Anand - Milind	Suresh Wadkar
Vaade Iraade	845	"Tum Ho Meri Sweetheart"	Jatin - Lalit	S P Balsubramanium
Watan	846	"Mafee de de Balamwa"	Shumon Gopal	Solo
Yuhi Kabhi	847	"Kai Baar Pehle"	Nikhil - Vinay	Udit Narayan
Yuhi Kabhi	848	"Chikna Chikna Chikna Chow"	Nikhil - Vinay	Udit Narayan
Yuhi Kabhi	849	"Main Nahin Hun Bewafa"	Nikhil - Vinay	Solo
Zaalim	850	Char Din Ka Safar	Annu Malik	Suresh Wadkar; Vinod Rathod
Zakhmi Dil	851	Payaliya Geet Sunayegi	Rishi Raj	Udit Narayan
Zakhmi Dil	852	"Choodi Khankaoun"	Rishi Raj	Solo
Zid	853	"Khoon-E-Jigar Se"	O P Nayyar	Madhuri Joglekar
Zid	854	"Kori Gagariya Meetha Paani"	O P Nayyar	Solo

=== 1995 ===
Film	No	Song	Composer(s)	Co-artist(s)
7 Days	855	"Tune Mera Naam Liya"	Babul Bose	Vinod Rathod
7 Days	856	"Yaad Bahoot Tum Aate Ho"	Babul Bose	Kumar Sanu
7 Days	857	"Janoo Meri Janoo"	Babul Bose	Kumar Sanu
7 Days	858	"Bach Ke Kaha Jayega"	Babul Bose	Kumar Sanu
7 Days	859	"Mujhe Tumse Koi"	Babul Bose	Solo
7 Days	860	"Ek Din Bhi Aisa Nahi"	Babul Bose	Kumar Sanu
Aashique Mastane	861	"Aye Din Hai Pyaar Ke"	Dilip Sen-Sameer Sen	Udit Narayan
Aashique Mastane	862	"Jaane Bhi Do"	Dilip Sen-Sameer Sen	Udit Narayan
Aashique Mastane	863	"Pyaar Ka Hota Hai"	Dilip Sen-Sameer Sen	Udit Narayan
Aatank Hi Aatank	864	"Duniya Se Hum Kab Darte"	Bappi Lahiri	Solo
Aatank Hi Aatank	865	"Mehakti Jumti"	Bappi Lahiri	Babla Mehta
Ab Insaf Hoga	866	"Pahali Milan Ki Raat"	Anand - Milind	Abhijeet
Baazi	867	"Dhadakta Hai Dil Mera"	Annu Malik	Udit Narayan
Baazi	868	"Dole Dole Dil Dole"	Annu Malik	Solo
Bank Robbery	869	"Chooha Billi"		Jolly Mukharjee
Barsaat	870	"Ishq Mein Ek Pal"	Nadeem - Shravan	Sonu Nigam
Bombay (D)	871	"Tu Hi Re"	A R Rahman	Hariharan
Bombay (D)	872	"Kucchi Kucchi Rakkamma"	A R Rahman	Udit Narayan; G V Prakash; Shraddha Pandit
Dil Ka Doctor	873	"Pehli Baar Dekha"	Bappi Lahiri	Solo
Dilbar	874	"Mere Dil Mein Lage Hain"	Laxmikant - Pyarelal	Kumar Sanu
Dilbar	875	"Hum Tum Yun Hi Milte Rahen To"	Laxmikant - Pyarelal	Kumar Sanu
Diya Aur Toofan	876	"Dhum Tara Tara"	Bappi Lahiri	Kumar Sanu
Diya Aur Toofan	877	"Odhe Lal Chunariya"	Bappi Lahiri	Solo
Diya Aur Toofan	878	"Nagri Nagri Dhoondhe"	Bappi Lahiri	Udit Narayan
Drohi	879	"Tan Mein Agni Jage"	R D Burman	Amit Kumar
Fauji	880	"Hongi Teri Majbooriyan"	Vishal Bharadwaj	Mohd Aziz
Fauji	881	"Kabhi Aankh Milaye"	Vishal Bharadwaj	Solo
Fauji	882	"Woh Mera Jaani Hai"	Vishal Bharadwaj	Solo
Fauji	883	"Hongi Teri Majbooriyan"	Vishal Bharadwaj	Mohd Aziz
Fauji	884	"Kabhi Aankh Milaye"	Vishal Bharadwaj	Solo
Fauji	885	"Hum Majnu Laila"	Vishal Bharadwaj	Solo
Fauji	886	"Tere Bina Nahi"	Vishal Bharadwaj	Illa Arun
Fauji	887	"Tere Bina Nahin Hai Guzaara"(Female)	Vishal Bharadwaj	Illa Arun
Gande Log	888	"Gande Log Gande Log"	Prakash Nerkar	Solo
Gande Log	889	"Beta Maa Ki"	Prakash Nerkar	Solo
Ghar Ka Kanoon	890	"Aadhi Raat Mein"	Sapan - Jagmohan	Solo
Ghar Ka Kanoon	891	"Aadhi Raat Mein"	Sapan - Jagmohan	Solo
Himalay Ke Aanchal Mein	892	Ghugti Resun Meri Baat	Ravindra Jain	Suresh Wadkar
Hum Sub Chor Hain	893	"Tota Se Lad Gaye"	Illa Arun; Kumar Sanu	
Hum Sub Chor Hain	894	"Tere Mere Pyar Ka"	Sapna Mukharjee	
Hum Sub Chor Hain	895	"Sona Sona Chand Sa"	Abhijeet; Arun	
Jaadu	896	"Kare Tumse Pyar"	Nikhil - Vinay	Kumar Sanu
Jaadu	897	"Todiye Dil Na"	Nikhil - Vinay	Solo
Jaadu	898	"Yeh Badal"	Nikhil - Vinay	S P Balsubramanium
Jaadu	899	"Tumhari Kasam"	Nikhil - Vinay	Solo
Jay Baba Pashupatinath	900	"Hey Pasupatinath Baba"	Murlidhar	Solo
Jai Bharat	901	"Dekh Ke Tujhko"	Vidyasagar	Kumar Sanu
Jai Vikraanta	902	"Tere Hothon Pe"	Anand - Milind	Sadhana Sargam
Jawab	903	Dil Churaya Neend Churayee	Annu Malik	Udit Narayan
Jeeja Sali	904	"Jeeja Jobaniya Jalebi"		Vinod Rathore
Juhi	905	"Tu Bewafa Nahi"	Devang Patel	Kumar Sanu
Juhi	906	"Andheri Raat Mein"	Devang Patel	Abhijeet
Kaala Sach	907	"Shin Shinaki Bubla Boo"	Vijay Davada	Nayan Kumar; Kavita Krishnaurthy
Kaala Sach	908	"Sari Duniya Kehti Hai"	Vijay Davada	Udit Narayan
Kaala Sach	909	"Tere Mere Beech Mein"	Vijay Davada	Solo
Kalyug Ke Avtaar	910	"Do Pyaat Karnewalon Ko"	Ravindra Jain	Kumar Sanu
Kartavya	911	"Adi Tappa Ye Desi Mem Hai"	Dilip Sen - Sameer Sen	Vinod Rathod
Kismat	912	"Tumhen Dil Kahoon"	Dilip Sen - Sameer Sen	Kumar Sanu
Lady Killer	913	"Chandni Raat Mein Tu Mila"		Solo
Lady Killer	914	"Sapna Hai Yeh"		Suresh Wadkar
Maidaan-E-Jung	918	"Tere Joban Ka"	Bappi Lahiri	Udit Narayan
Mehboob Ki Bahoon Mein	919	"Mehbooba O Mehbooba"		Kumar Sanu
Mehboob Ki Bahoon Mein	920	"Gaon Ka Chora"		Solo
Mera Damad	921	"Aaena Aisa Waqt"	Salil Chowdhary	Solo
Mere Naina Sawan Bhadon	922	"Sawan Ka Jab Aaye Mausam"	Sawan Kumar Sawan	Solo
Mere Naina Sawan Bhadon	923	"Angiyan Maga De"	Sawan Kumar Sawan	Solo
Meri Mohabbat Mera Naseeba	924	"Hum to Paagal Premi"	Anand - Milind	Kumar Sanu
Meri Mohabbat Mera Naseeba	925	"Botal Mein Bandh Hai"	Anand - Milind	Solo
Milan	926	"Aa Jaana"	Anand - Milind	Abhijeet
Milan	927	"Ladki Jab Aaye"	Anand - Milind	Kumar Sanu
Mohabbaton Ka Safar	928	"Mohabbaton Ka Safar Hai" (Duet)	Khayyam	Pankaj Udhas
Mohabbaton Ka Safar	929	"Ae Hawaa Unko Paigaam Dena"	Khayyam	Solo
Mohabbaton Ka Safar	930	"Zindagi Jo Hai Bachi"	Khayyam	Solo
Mohabbaton Ka Safar	931	"Tujhe Gulaab Kiya Pesh"	Khayyam	Udit Narayan
Mohabbaton Ka Safar	932	"Mohabbaton Ka Safar Hai" (Female)	Khayyam	Solo
Mohabbaton Ka Safar	933	"This Is the Rainy Season"	Khayyam	Suresh Wadkar
Mohabbaton Ka Safar	934	"Ishq Mein Humne" (Part 2)	Khayyam	Solo
Mohabbaton Ka Safar	935	"Jaan-E-Jaana Neend"	Khayyam	Solo
Nazar Ke Saamne	936	"Itne Kareeb Aaye"	Mahesh - Kishore	Solo
Nazar Ke Saamne	937	"Umar Dekh Jaani Kamar Dekh Jaani"	Mahesh - Kishore	Solo
Paandav	938	"Aaj Main Yeh Izhaar"	Jatin - Lalit	Kumar Sanu
Police Lockup	939	"Astahee Mera Yakin Karo"	Sawan Kumar Sawan	Sonu Nigam
Rangeela	940	"Pyaar Ye Jaane Kaise"	A. R. Rahman	Suresh Wadkar
Ravan Raaj	941	"Yaar Mere Mausam Hai"	Viju Shah	Abhijeet
Reshma	942	"Hum Banjare"	Dilip Sen - Sameer Sen	Shabbir Kumar
Reshma	943	"Reshma"	Dilip Sen - Sameer Sen	Solo
Reshma	944	"Sipayaa Tu Qaidi Mera Ho"	Dilip Sen - Sameer Sen	Solo
Rock Dancer	945	"Launda Badnaam Hua"	Bappi Lahiri	Bappi Lahiri
Saajan Ke Liye	946	"Tumhi Ne Rang"	Bappi Lahiri	Kumar Sanu
Sanjay	947	"Raat Choti Baat Badi"	Shyam - Surender	Udit Narayan
Sanjay	948	"Hum Aur Tum"	Shyam - Surender	Kumar Sanu
Sanjay	949	"Pardesi Aaya"	Shyam - Surender	Vinod Rathod
Sanjay	950	"Hum Ko Tum Se Pyar"	Shyam - Surender	Kumar Sanu
Sanjay	951	"Jeevan Mein Ho Pyar"	Shyam - Surender	Udit Narayan; Aditya Narayan
Sanjay	952	"Tum Ko Hain"	Shyam - Surender	Kumar Sanu
Sarhad	953	"Mujhe to Tumse Pyar Hai"	Sukhwinder Singh	Baba Sehgal
Sarhad	954	"Aap Ko Dekh Kar"	Sukhwinder Singh	Kumar Sanu
Sarhad	955	"Kangna Kya Kaheta Hai"	Sukhwinder Singh	Udit Narayan
The Don	956	"Rajai Ma to Garmi Lage"	Dilip Sen - Sameer Sen	Udit Narayan
Top Hero (D)	957	"Ek Baar Mujhe Bulayegi"	S. V. Krishna Reddy	Shankar Mahadevan
Top Hero (D)	958	"Pyar Ki Dil Mein Aag Lagi Hai"	S. V. Krishna Reddy	Kumar Sanu
Trimurti	959	"E Ri Sakhi"	Laxmikant - Pyarelal	Solo
Yaraana	960	"Jaane Woh Kaisa Chor Tha"	Anu Malik	Solo
Yaraana	961	"Mera Piya Ghar Aaya"	Anu Malik	Solo
Yaraana	962	"Mohabbat Ke Nazare Karam"	Anu Malik	Vinod Rathod
Yaraana	963	"Noorani Chehre"	Anu Malik	Solo
Yaraana	964	"Rabbi Re Ralli"	Anu Malik	Udit Narayan
Yaraana	965	"Loye Loye"	Anu Malik	Solo
Zulm Ka Jawab	966	"Jaise Jaise Din Guzrega"	Bappi Lahiri	Mohd Aziz

=== 1996 ===
Film	No	Song	Composer(s)	Co-artist(s)
Agnee Prem	967	Roshni Chand Se" (Part 1)	Bappi Lahiri	Bappi Lahiri
Agnee Prem	968	"Jaan Banke Rehenge"	Bappi Lahiri	Udit Narayan
Agnee Prem	969	"Banke Saajan Ko Mera Salaam"	Bappi Lahiri	Solo
Agnee Prem	970	"Roshni Chand Se" (Part 2)	Bappi Lahiri	Bappi Lahiri
Agni Sakshi	971	"O Piya O Piya"	Nadeem - Shravan	Babul Supriyo
Agni Sakshi	972	"O Yaara Dil Lagana"	Nadeem - Shravan	Solo
Agni Sakshi	973	"Wada Karo Dil Se"	Nadeem - Shravan	Jolly Mukharjee
Agni Sakshi	974	"Tu Meri Gulfam Hai"	Nadeem - Shravan	Kumar Sanu
Angaara	975	Dheere Dheere	Dilip Sen - Sameer Sen	Mohd Aziz
Angaara	976	"Aaja Chori Banki"	Dilip Sen - Sameer Sen	Kumar Sanu
Aurat Aurat Aurat	977	"Sabka Daman Chhod Ke"	Laxmikant - Pyarelal	Solo
Bal Bramhachari	978	"Nazren Ladgaiya"	Bappi Lahiri	Ram Shankar
Bhairavi	979	"Chal Ri Pawan"	Laxmikant - Pyarelal	Solo
Bhairavi	980	"Ab Ke Saawan Mein"	Laxmikant - Pyarelal	Solo
Bhairavi	981	"Beech Bhanwar Se"	Laxmikant - Pyarelal	Solo
Bhairavi	982	"Kuchh Is Tarah"	Laxmikant - Pyarelal	Udit Narayan
Bhairavi	983	"Om Namah Shivaya"	Laxmikant - Pyarelal	Roop Kumar Rathod
Bhairavi	984	"Balam Kesariya"	Laxmikant - Pyarelal	Udit Narayan
Bhishma	985	"Chaahe Jaan Jaaye"	Dilip Sen-Sameer Sen	Udit Narayan
Bhishma	986	"Dil Jo Lagaaye"		Udit Narayan
Captain Shiva	987	"Mere Jaan Tum Se"	Sirpy	Solo
Chahhat	988	"Nahin Jeena Yaar Bina"	Annu Malik	Udit Narayan
Chhaila	989	"Laage Nahin Mora"	Illaiyaraaja	Sonu Nigam
Daraar	990	"Ye Pyar Pyar Kya Hai"	Annu Malik	Abhijeet
Dil Tere Deewana	991	"Aap Se Hoke"	Aadesh Shrivastava	Udit Narayan
Diljale	992	"Mera Mulk Mera Desh"	Anu Malik	solo
Duniya Jhukti Hai	993	"Nafrat Ki Duniya Se Door"	Anand - Milind	Abhijeet
Duniya Jhukti Hai	994	"Aankhon Ne Padh Li"	Anand - Milind	Udit Narayan
Duniya Jhukti Hai	995	"Madonna Dil Do Na"	Anand - Milind	Solo
Durjan	996	"Hari Om Tatsat Hari Om"	Sapan - Jagmohan	Amit Kumar
Durjan	997	"Koi Mangta Dil"	Sapan - Jagmohan	Mohd Aziz; Udit Narayan
Dushmani	998	"Kabhi Hanste Hai Kabhi"	Anand - Milind	S P Balsubramanium
Dushmani	999	"Badi Mushkil Se Main"	Anand - Milind	Anand Srivastava
Ek Tha Raja	1000	"Saawan Ki Raaton Mein"	Anand - Milind	Abhijeet
English Babu Desi Mem	1001	"Na Tere Bina"	Nikhil - Vinay	Solo
Gehra Raaz	1002	"Idhar Jane Mehfil"	Deepak Khanuja	Solo
Gehra Raaz	1003	"In Thandi Garam"	Deepak Khanuja	Solo
Ghatak	1004	"Badan Mein Chandini"	R D Burman	Solo
Great Robbery	1005	"Yeh Sama Yeh Sama"	Raj–Koti	Hariharan
Great Robbery	1006	"Chamaka Hai Teri Mohabat"	Raj–Koti	Hariharan
Hahakaar	1007	"Likh le Dil Ki"	Bappi Lahiri	Solo
Hasina Aur Nagina	1008	"Mai Hoon Ek Hasina"	Dilip Sen - Sameer Sen	Shobha Joshi
Hind Ki Beti	1009	"Ranga Ranga Sunle Ranga"	Sonik - Omi	Solo
Hind Ki Beti	1010	"Lado Ne Lado"	Sonik - Omi	Solo
Hind Ki Beti	1011	"Jammu Ki Jawani Kashmir Ki"	Sonik - Omi	Mohd Aziz
Hindustani	1012	"Telephone"	A R Rahman	Hariharan
Hukumnaama	1013	"Mujhe Jana Hai"	Iqbal Qureshi	Udit Narayan
Hukumnaama	1014	"Tera Kamre Mein Nahin Aaoongi"	Iqbal Qureshi	Solo
Hukumnaama	1015	"Iric Miric Sone Ki"	Iqbal Qureshi	Mohd Aziz
Hum Hai Khalnayak	1016	"Garam Garam"	Bappi Lahiri	Bappi Lahiri
Jagannath	1017	"Jaaneman Dekhiye"	Arpita Raaj	Solo
Jagannath	1018	"Its Time Up"	Arpita Raaj	Solo
Jai Dakshineshwar Kaali Maa	1019	"Main Hoon Ek Nanhi Bachchi"	Arun Paudwal	Kavita Paudwal
Jeet	1020	"Dil Ka Kya Karein Sahib"	Nadeem - Shravan	Solo
Jeetenge Hum	1021	"Yeh Dil Tha Diwana"	Viju Shah	Abhijeet; Udit Narayan
Jung	1022	"Deewana Deewana"	Nadeem - Shravan	Abhijeet
Jung	1023	"Jabse Tumko Dekha Hai"	Nadeem - Shravan	Solo
Jung	1024	"Aadhi Raat Ko"	Nadeem - Shravan	Vinod Rathod
Jung	1025	"Ooi Amma Ooi Amma"	Nadeem - Shravan	Solo
Jurmana	1026	"Dil Deewana Ho Gaya"	Dilip Sen - Sameer Sen	Solo
Khamoshi: The Musical	1027	"Gaate the Pehle Akele	Jatin - Lalit	Shraddha Pandit; Khusnum
Khamoshi: The Musical	1028	"Aaj Mein Upar"	Jatin - Lalit	Kumar Sanu
Khamoshi: The Musical	1029	"Yeh Dil Sun Raha Hai"	Jatin - Lalit	Solo
Khamoshi: The Musical	1030	"Mausam Ke Sargam Ko"	Jatin - Lalit	Shraddha Pandit
Khel Khiladi Ka	1031	"Babu Lo Chal Gaya Jadu"	A R Rahman	S P Balsubramanium
Khiladiyon Ka Khiladi	1032	"Itna Mujhe Pata Hai"	Annu Malik	Abhijeet
Khilona	1033	"Chhora Re Chhichora"	Naresh Sharma	Vinod Rathod
Khilona	1034	"Panditji Panditji"	Naresh Sharma	Bali Bramhabhatt
Laalchee	1035	"Dekho Na"	Dilip Sen - Sameer Sen	Udit Narayan
Maa Ki Shakti	1036	Annapurna Mata	Triveni - Bhawani	Solo
Maa Ki Shakti	1037	"Durga Hamari Hai Maa Bholi Bhali"	Triveni - Bhawani	Vinod Rathod
Maahir	1038	"Deewana Pan Hain Yeh"	Bappi Lahiri	Mohd Aziz
Masoom	1039	"Sojaa Mere Laadle" (Sad)	Anand Raaj Anand	Abhijeet
Masoom	1040	"Sojaa Mere Laadle"	Anand Raaj Anand	Abhijeet
Maun -The Silence	1041	"Happy New Year"	M M Keeravani	Solo
Maun -The Silence	1042	"Bum Bum Bhole"	M M Keeravani	Venugopal
Megha	1043	"Dildar Jab Tak Na Mile"	Surinder Kohli	Kumar Sanu
Megha	1044	"Mohabbat Zindabad"	Ram Laxman	Solo
Miyan Biwi Aur Saali	1045	"Honth Tere"	M. M. Keeravani	Udit Narayan
Miyan Biwi Aur Saali	1046	"Teri Zulfen Tera Kajal"	M. M. Keeravani	Kumar Sanu
Mr. Aashiq	1047	"Bada Gazab Ka Yaar Hai"	Jatin - Lalit	Abhijeet; Sonu Nigam
Mukka	1048	Tere Chehre Pe	Anu Malik	Kumar Sanu
Mukka	1049	"Mohabbat Jo Tumse"	Anu Malik	Kumar Sanu
Muqadama	1050	"Rang Bi-Rangi Chudiyaan"	Bappi Lahiri	Solo
Nazarr	1051	"Yeh Kya Hua"	Dilip Sen - Sameer Sen	Abhijeet
Nazarr	1052	"Tu Hai Main Hoon"	Dilip Sen - Sameer Sen	Babla Mehta
Nazarr	1053	"Meri Jaan-E-Ada"	Dilip Sen - Sameer Sen	Abhijeet
Nirbhay	1054	"Kaiko Hairan Karta"	Raam Laxman	Suresh Wadkar
Papa Kehte Hain	1055	"Pehle Pyaar Ka Pehla Gum"	Rajesh Roshan	Solo
Parakrami	1056	"Aao Re Aao"	Laxmikant - Pyarelal	Amit Kumar
Parakrami	1057	"Gunahon Ki Rahon Se"	Laxmikant - Pyarelal	
Pyar Karenge Pal Pal	1058	"Hum Pyar Ke Rahi"	Ravindra Jain	Vinod Rathod
Pyar Karenge Pal Pal	1059	"Roop Ki Rani"	Ravindra Jain	Vinod Rathod
Raja Ki Aayegi Baaraat	1060	"Chanda Ki Chori"	Aadesh Shrivastava	Aditya Narayan; Sabahat Akhtar
Rajkumar	1061	"Aankhon Ke Aage Peechhe"	Laxmikant - Pyarelal	Solo
Rangbaaz	1062	"Aanewala Hai Toofan"	Bappi Lahiri	Solo
Return of Jewel Thief	1063	"Chehra Haseen Hai"	Jatin - Lalit	Udit Narayan
Saagar Kanya (D)	1064	"Tumko Chumne Se"	M. M. Kreem	Vinod Rathod
Saagar Kanya (D)	1065	"Apni Chunariya Mein Kya Kya"	M. M. Kreem	Vinod Rathod
Sabse Bada Mawaali	1066	"Priya Ka Jab Deedar Hua"	Illaiyaraaja	Kumar Sanu
Sabse Bada Mawaali	1067	"Yauwan Kuhu Kuhu Bole"	Illaiyaraaja	Solo
Sabse Bada Mawaali	1068	"Priya Ka Jab Deedar Hua"	Illaiyaraaja	solo
Shohrat	1069	"Tu Dam Dam Dhol Bajaa"	Nikhil-Vinay	Udit Narayan
Sindoor Ki Holi	1070	"Aao More Rasiya"	Raj kamal	Dilraj Kaur
Smuggler	1071	"Ab Tum Se Chhup Chhup"	Bappi Lahiri	Udit Narayan
Spot Boy	1072	"Tu Aaja Re Aaja"	Iqbal Qureshi	Solo
Talaashi	1073	"Maine Tujhko Pyar Kiya Hai"	Anand - Milind	Solo
Tasveer Mere Sanam Ki	1074	"Jab Badal Chachye"	Arpita Raaj	Solo
Tera Naam Mera Naam	1075	"Pyar Mein Kabhi Kabhi"	Kuldeep Singh	Mohd Aziz
Tere Mere Sapne	1076	"Ladki Aankh Maare"	Viju Shah	Kumar Sanu
Tu Chor Main Sipahi	1077	"Jaane Man Jaane Jan"	Dilip Sen - Sameer Sen	Kumar Sanu
Uff Yeh Mohabbat	1078	"Haan Mujhe Tumse Mohabbat Hai"	Nikhil - Vinay	Kumar Sanu
Uff Yeh Mohabbat	1079	"Meri Chhat Pe Aaya Karo"	Nikhil - Vinay	Gurdas Maan
Uff Yeh Mohabbat	1080	"Barson Ke Baad"	Nikhil - Vinay	Kumar Sanu
Uff Yeh Mohabbat	1081	"Maine Seekha Jo Pyaar Ka Pahada"	Nikhil - Vinay	Udit Narayan
Vachan	1082	"Pyar Ka Hai"	Sukhwinder Singh	Solo
Vijeta	1083	"Shaire Mein Ho Gaya Deewana"	Anand–Milind	Abhijeet

=== 1997 ===
Film	No	Song	Composer(s)	Co-artist(s)
Aar Ya Paar	1084	"Suna Hai Phool"	Viju Shah	Kumar Sanu
Agnee Morcha	1085	"Tere Qamar Ke Jhatke"	Shyam - Surender	Udit Narayan
Agnee Morcha	1086	"Tu Mere Pyar Ka"	Shyam - Surender	Kumar Sanu
Agnee Morcha	1087	"Dhadkan Kah Rahi Hai"	Shyam - Surender	Solo
Agnee Morcha	1088	"Meri Ankhon Se"	Shyam - Surender	Solo
Agnichakra	1089	"Aila Rani Ka Dil"	Bappi Lahiri	Amit Kumar
Betaabi	1090	"Don't Take Panga"	Vishal Bharadwaj	Solo
Bhai Bhai	1091	"Haloo Haloo"	Aadesh Shrivastava	Abhijeet
Chudail	1092	"Tu Mera Shayar"	Usha Khanna	Solo
Churalia Nigahon Se	1093	"Teri Aankhon Mein Meri"	Jay - Vijay	Kumar Sanu
Churalia Nigahon Se	1094	"Chori Chori Yaar Kare Hai"	Jay - Vijay	Kumar Sanu
Daadagiri	1095	Tirchhi Najariya	Dilip Sen - Sameer Sen	Kumar Sanu
Daadagiri	1096	"Mujhe Yaara Tere Pyar"	Dilip Sen - Sameer Sen	Kumar Sanu
Daadagiri	1097	"Maine Tujhe Chaaha"	Dilip Sen - Sameer Sen	Mohammed Aziz
Daadagiri	1098	"Maine Jise Chaaha"	Dilip Sen - Sameer Sen	Solo
Daadagiri	1099	"Yeh Bandhan Hai"	Dilip Sen - Sameer Sen	Babul Supriyo; Nirja Pandit
Daava	1100	"Ru Tu Tu Tu"	Jatin - Lalit	Kumar Sanu
Daava	1101	"Deewane Hain Deewano Se"	Jatin - Lalit	Kumar Sanu; Vijayta Pandit Shrivastava
Dalpati	1102	"En Ankhon Ka Tu Tara"	Illaiyaraaja	Solo
Daud	1103	"Ye Jan"	A. R. Rahman	Vinod Rathod
Deewana Mastana	1104	"Head Ya Tail"	Laxmikant - Pyarelal	Udit Narayan; Vinod Rathod
Dharma Karma	1105	Mujhe Chand Taaron Ki	Bappi Lahiri	Vinod Rathod
Dharma Karma	1106	"Roothona Jaane Tammana"	Bappi Lahiri	Kumar Sanu
Dil Ke Jharoke Main	1107	"Shahe Dilbara"	Bappi Lahiri	Kumar Sanu
Do Ankhen Barah Hath	1108	"Jo Bhi Dekhe Aap Ko"	Bappi Lahiri	Kumar Sanu
Ek Phool Teen Kante	1109	"Chehra Na Dekhungi"	Jatin - Lalit	Solo
Ek Phool Teen Kante	1110	"Sun O Sherawali"	Jatin - Lalit	Vinod Rathod
Ganga Mange Khoon	1111	"Lal Duppata Mera"	Rajkamal	Sudesh Bhosle
Ganga Mange Khoon	1112	"Hey Nageshwar Hey Gangeswar"	Rajkamal	Sadhana Sargam
Ghunghat	1113	"Tu Hi Mera Shiva"	Anand Raaj Anand	Solo
Ghulam-E-Mustafa	1114	"Tera Gam Mera Gam"	Rajesh Roshan	Hariharan
Ghulam-E-Mustafa	1115	"Tera Gam Mera Gam" (Sad)	Rajesh Roshan	Hariharan
Gudgudee	1116	"Bikhri Hui Chandini"	Bappi Lahiri	Vinod Rathod
Gudgudee	1117	"Mausam Suhana Hai"	Bappi Lahiri	Kumar Sanu
Gudgudee	1118	"Main to Pritam Ko"	Bappi Lahiri	Solo
Gudia	1119	"Hum Tum Hue" (duet)	Goutam Ghose; Arthur Gracius	Manna Dey
Gudia	1120	"Hum Tum Hue"	Goutam Ghose; Arthur Gracius	Solo
Gundagardi	1121	"Bheja Jo Pyar Aapne"	Jatin - Lalit	Kumar Sanu
Gupt	1122	"Yeh Pyaar Kya Ha"	Viju Shah	Alka Yagnik; Kumar Sanu
Gupt	1123	"Gupt Gupt"	Viju Shah	Hema Sardesai; Chetan
Gupt	1124	"Gupt Gupt" (extended)	Viju Shah	Hema Sardesai; Chetan
Himalay Putra	1125	"Bam Bam Bhole"	Anu Malik	Udit Narayan, Shankar Mahadevan
Humein Jahan Pyar Mile	1126	"Dil le le Dil de De"	Dilip Sen - Sameer Sen	Kumar Sanu
Humein Jahan Pyar Mile	1127	"Beautiful India"	Dilip Sen - Sameer Sen	Hariharan
Humein Jahan Pyar Mile	1128	"Tu Kar le Mujhe Pyaar"	Dilip Sen - Sameer Sen	Abhijeet
Ishq	1129	"Neend Churai Meri"	Anu Malik	Alka Yagnik; Kumar Sanu; Udit Narayan
Ishq	1130	"Mr. Lova Lova"	Anu Malik	Udit Narayan; Abhijeet; Sudesh Bhosle; Poornima
Jab Dil Kisi Pe Aata Hain	1131	"Deewana Dil Kho Gaya"	Sandeep Chowta	Hariharan
Jab Dil Kisi Pe Aata Hain	1132	"Ooyee Amma Ooyee Amma"	Sandeep Chowta	Shubha; Rajesh Krishnan
Jai Mahalaxmi Maa	1133	"Jai Mahalaxmi Maa"	Prabha Thakur	Solo
Jeeo Shaan Se	1134	"Gar Pyar Na Kiya"	Shyam - Surender	Kumar Sanu
Jeeo Shaan Se	1135	"Gharwale Ghar Nahin"	Shyam - Surender	Bali Bramhabhatt
Jeeo Shaan Se	1136	"Om Naam Leke Shuru"	Shyam - Surender	Vinod Rathod; Udit Narayan; Gurdas Maan; Bela Sulakhe
Jeeo Shaan Se	1137	"Jeeo Shaan Se"	Shyam - Surender	Vinod Rathod; Udit Narayan; Gurdas Maan; Bela Sulakhe
Jeeo Shaan Se	1138	"Yeh Kya Hua Hai Mujhko"	Shyam - Surender	Udit Narayan
Jeeo Shaan Se	1139	"Na Khol Tu Pat Ghunghat Ke"	Shyam - Surender	Udit Narayan
Jeeo Shaan Se	1140	"Radha Radha Kishan Kishan"	Shyam - Surender	Kumar Sanu
Jeevan Yudh	1141	"Kameez Meri Kaali"	Nadeem - Shravan	Ila Arun
Jeevan Yudh	1142	"Tu Hai Mere Dil Ka"	Nadeem - Shravan	Nachiketa Chakraborty
Jeevan Yudh	1143	"Sharm Aane Lagi"	Nadeem - Shravan	Solo
Jeevan Yudh	1144	"Kangna Kalaai Mein Khanke"	Nadeem - Shravan	Solo
Jodidar	1145	"Samay Aayega"	Bappi Lahiri	Babul Supriyo
Judge Mujrim	1146	Bin Sajni Ke	Bappi Lahiri	Udit Narayan
Judge Mujrim	1147	"Parda Parda"	Bappi Lahiri	Reema Lahiri; Ram Shankar
Judge Mujrim	1148	"Qatra Shabnam Ka"	Bappi Lahiri	Kumar Sanu
Judwaa	1149	Tera Aana Tera Jaana	Anu Malik	Kumar Sanu
Judwaa	1150	"Duniya Mein Aaye"	Anu Malik	Kumar Sanu
Kaalia	1151	"Jo Bhi Dhundhungi"	Anand Raaj Anand	Solo
Kaalia	1152	"Tumne Di Sadaa Aur Mein"	Anand Raaj Anand	Udit Narayan
Kaun Rokega Mujhe	1153	"Haath Mera Pakadne Se Pahle"	Laxmikant - Pyarelal	Solo
Kaun Rokega Mujhe	1154	"Dushmanon Ki Badi Meharbani"	Laxmikant - Pyarelal	Shailendra Singh
Kaun Sachcha Kaun Jhootha	1155	"Hum Do Diwane"	Rajesh Roshan	Abhijeet
Khiladi No. 1	1156	Tip Top Look	Illaiyaraaja	Kumar Sanu
Khiladi No. 1	1157	"Hello Madam"	Illaiyaraaja	Vinod Rathod
Koi Kisise Kum Nahin	1158	"Hum Ko Hone Do Sharabi"	Anand Raaj Anand	Udit Narayan
Koi Kisise Kum Nahin	1159	"Gham Ko Dil Se"	Anand Raaj Anand	Preeti; Vinod Rathod; Anand Raaj Anand
Koi Kisise Kum Nahin	1160	"Hum Tum Milke"	Anand Raaj Anand	Udit Narayan
Koi Kisise Kum Nahin	1161	"Jane Kyun Na Tu"	Anand Raaj Anand	Abhijeet
Koi Kisise Kum Nahin	1162	"Sawali Hasina"	Anand Raaj Anand	Kumar Sanu
Koyla	1163	"Sanson Ki Mala"	Rajesh Roshan	Solo
Krantikari	1164	"Aankhon Mein Hai Teri Chhabi"	Burman Bros	Kavita Paudwal; Sonu Nigam
Lav Kush	1165	"Saari Ayodhya Naachti"	Raam Laxman	Alka Yagnik
Mahaanta	1166	"Tin Tina Tin"	Laxmikant - Pyarelal	Amit Kumar; Mohammed Aziz; Chorus
Mahaanta	1167	"Tapka Re Tapka 2"	Laxmikant - Pyarelal	Mohammed Aziz
Mere Dil Ke Aangan Mein	1168	"Aankhon Ne Tumko Chaha"	Nikhil - Vinay	Kumar Sanu
Mere Dil Ke Aangan Mein	1169	"Dil Hogaya Deewana"	Nikhil - Vinay	Kumar Sanu
Mohabbat	1170	"Chori Chori"	Nadeem - Shravan	Solo
Mohabbat	1171	"Dil Ki Dhadkan"	Nadeem - Shravan	Udit Narayan
Mohabbat	1172	"Main Hoon Akela"	Nadeem - Shravan	Abhijeet
Mohabbat	1173	"Pyar Kiya Hai"	Nadeem - Shravan	Vinod Rathod
Pardes	1174	"I Love My India"	Nadeem - Shravan	Shankar Mahadevan; Hariharan; Aditya Narayan
Pardes	1175	"I Love My India" (Part 2)	Nadeem - Shravan	Solo
Prem Alaap	1176	"Tere Dil Ke Kissi"	Kanu Bhattacharya	Sarva
Prem Alaap	1177	"Socha The Ek Din"	Kanu Bhattacharya	Udit Narayan
Prithvi	1178	"Mera Dil de Diya"	Viju Shah	Udit Narayan
Sajna Doli Peke Aana	1179	"Jhatpat Aaja Gori"	M. M. Keeravani	S P Balasubrahmanyam
Sanam	1180	"Kasam Se Kasam Khake Kahdo"	Anand - Milind	Abhijeet
Sanam	1181	"Dhak Dhak Dil Kare Ghabraoon Sajana"	Anand - Milind	Solo
Sapnay	1182	"Strawberry Aankhein"	A R Rahman	K K; Kavita Paudwal
Tarazu	1183	"Premee Premee"	Rajesh Roshan	Udit Narayan
Vinashak	1184	"Rooba Rooba"	Viju Shah	Solo
Vinashak	1185	"Chal Chal"	Viju Shah	Udit Narayan
Virasat	1186	"Dhol Bajne Laga"	Anu Malik	Udit Narayan
Vishwavidhaata	1187	"Shambho Shambho"	A. R. Rahman	Subha
Vishwavidhaata	1188	"Nazron Ke Milne Se"	A. R. Rahman	Solo
Vishwavidhaata	1189	"Hum Dum Pyaara Pyaara"	A. R. Rahman	Udit Narayan
Zara Si Bhool	1190	"Zamane Ke Maalik"	Gaurang Vyas	Suresh Wadkar

=== 1998 ===
Film	No	Song	Composer(s)	Co-artist(s)
2001: Do Hazaar Ek	1191	"Tu Qaatil Tera Dil Qaatil"	Anand Raaj Anand	Udit Narayan
2001: Do Hazaar Ek	1192	"Yehi to Pyar Hai"	Anand Raaj Anand	Mohammed Aziz
Aakrosh	1193	"Hello Hello Bolke"	Anand Raaj Anand	Abhijeet
Aakrosh	1194	"Picnic Mein Hogaya"	Anand Raaj Anand	Udit Narayan; Aditya Narayan
Aakrosh	1195	"Yeh Ladki Hai"	Anand Raaj Anand	Udit Narayan
Achanak	1196	"Jhoom Le"	Dilip Sen-Sameer Sen	Abhijeet Bhattacharya
Ajnabi Saaya	1197	"Kathak Karega Bhangra"	Dilip Dutta	Solo
Angaar Vadee	1198	"Jaadugar Tu Hai Jaadugar"	Harry Anand	Raja
Angaar Vadee	1199	"Dil Mera Leke Nakhre Dikhao Na"	Harry Anand	Saud Khan; Harry Anand; Chorus
Angaar Vadee	1200	"Jaani Jaan Le"	Harry Anand	Jolly Mukherjee
Angaar Vadee	1201	"Maine O Yaraa"	Harry Anand	Jolly Mukherjee; Chorus
Angaar Vadee	1202	"Mera Roop Salona"	Harry Anand	Saud Khan; Harry Anand; Chorus
Bada Din	1203	"Na Koi Tera (part 1)"	Jatin - Lalit	Udit Narayan
Bada Din	1204	"Behoshi Tan Man"	Jatin - Lalit	Hema Sardesai
Bada Din	1205	"Na Koi Tera (part 2)"	Jatin - Lalit	Abhijeet
Bade Miyan Chote Miyan	1206	"Deta Jai Jo Re" (Part 1)	Viju Shah	Anuradha Paudwal; Udit Narayan; Amit Kumar
Bade Miyan Chote Miyan	1207	"Deta Jai Jo Re" (Part 2)	Viju Shah	Alka Yagnik; Udit Narayan; Sudesh Bhosle
Badmaash	1208	"Pehle Nahi Thi Kabhi"	Shyam - Surender	Kumar Sanu
Bandhan	1209	Tere Naina	Anand Raaj Anand	Udit Narayan
Bandhan	1210	"Balle Balle"	Himesh Reshammiya	Abhijeet; Sapna Awasthi
Barsaat Ki Raat	1211	"Maine Dil Ka Hukum Sun Liya"	Laxmikant - Pyarelal	Alka Yagnik; Mohammed Aziz
Barsaat Ki Raat	1212	"Teri Haan Ka Teri Na Ka"	Laxmikant - Pyarelal	Mohammed Aziz
Barsaat Ki Raat	1213	"Mohabaat Ki Kismat Pe Aata Hai Rona"	Laxmikant - Pyarelal	Solo
Barsaat Ki Raat	1214	"Wada Karke Sajan Nahi Aaya"	Laxmikant - Pyarelal	Hariharan; Mohd Aziz; Sayed Sabri
Daayan	1215	"Mera Likhlo Pager Number"	Ghulam Ali Kham	Solo
Daayan	1216	"Mera Kaatil Tu"	Ghulam Ali Kham	Solo
Daayan	1217	"Mera Kaatil Tu" (version 2)	Ghulam Ali Kham	Solo
Deewana Hoon Pagal Nahin	1218	"English Gana Russi"	Aadesh Shrivastava	Sonu Nigam
Devta	1219	"Ek Tura Tara Hum"	Dilip Sen - Sameer Sen	Sonu Nigam; Anuradha Paudwal
Dhadak	1220	"Dhire Dhire Aana"	Kanu Bhattacharya	Abhijeet
Dil Se	1221	"Satrangi Re"	A R Rahman	Sonu Nigam
Doli Saja Ke Rakhna	1222	"Bol Sajni Mori Sajni"	A. R. Rahman	Sonu Nigam
Duplicate	1223	"Ladna Jhagadna"	Anu Malik	Abhijeet
Duplicate	1224	"Ek Shararat Hone Ko Hai"	Anu Malik	Kumar Sanu
Ek Tha Dil Ek Thi Dhadkan	1225	"Baahon Mein Aao"	Anand Raaj Anand; Surendra Sodhi	Abhijeet
Ek Tha Dil Ek Thi Dhadkan	1226	"Badal Baharein"	Anand Raaj Anand; Surendra Sodhi	Udit Narayan
Ek Tha Dil Ek Thi Dhadkan	1227	"O Mere Dulhe Raja"	Anand Raaj Anand; Surendra Sodhi	Nayan Rathod; Jojo
Ghar Bazar	1228	"Main del Bech Doongi"	Usha Khanna	Solo
Gunda	1229	"Teri Ankhon Ka Jadoo"	Anand Raaj Anand	Kumar Sanu
Hafta Vasuli	1230	"Gagan Chho Loo Mein"	Rajesh Roshan	Kumar Sanu
Hatya Kaand	1231	"Sajana Tere Bina"	Joykar Bahreen	Solo
Hatyara	1232	"Chick Lumpo Lala Ji"	Dilip Sen - Sameer Sen	Udit Narayan
Himmatwala	1233	"Main To Tere Pyar Mein"	Tabun Sutradhar	Kumar Sanu
Humse Badhkar Kaun	1234	"Chhat Mangni Pat Byaha"	Viju Shah	Udit Narayan; Abhijeet
Humse Badhkar Kaun	1235	"Suite Boot Pahno Ya Kurta"	Viju Shah	Sapna Mukharjee; Vinod Rathod; Udit Narayan
Jaane Jigar	1236	"Chahne Wale Aaj"	Rajesh Roshan	Kumar Sanu
Jeans	1237	"Hai Rabba"	A. R. Rahman	Udit Narayan
Jeans	1238	"Kehta Hai Mera Dil"	A. R. Rahman	Solo
Jeans	1239	"Kehne Ko Dadi"	A. R. Rahman	Sonu Nigam; Kavita Paudwal; Sukhwinder Singh; Sangeetha
Keemat – They Are Back	1240	"O Mere Chhaila"	Rajesh Roshan	Alka Yagnik; Babul Supriyo; Nayan Rathod
Kuch Kuch Hota Hai	1241	Koi Mil Gaya	Jatin - Lalit	Alka Yagnik; Udit Narayan
Kuch Kuch Hota Hai	1242	"Saajan Ji Ghar Aaye"	Jatin - Lalit	Alka Yagnik; Kumar Sanu
Kudrat	1243	"Tujhe Dene Ko"	Rajesh Roshan	Abhijeet Bhattacharya
Love Story 98	1244	"Guddi Guddi"	Bappi Lahiri	Bappi Lahiri; Bappa Lahiri; Arun Bakshi
Mafia Raaj	1245	"Hungama Hai Teri Jawaani"	Dilip Sen-Sameer Sen	Udit Narayan
Maha Yudh	1246	"Tinak Dhin Dhani"	Laxmikant - Pyarelal	Nitin Mukesh; Udit Narayan
Maha Yudh	1247	"Waqt Waqt Ki Hai Baat"	Laxmikant - Pyarelal	Solo
Mahaatma	1248	Unse Nazren Mili	Anil Mohile	Kumar Sanu
Mahaatma	1249	"Tere Naam"	Anil Mohile	Suresh Wadkar
Mahaatma	1250	"Dur Hoon"	Anil Mohile	Suresh Wadkar
Mahaatma	1251	"Unse Nazren Mili LL"	Anil Mohile	Kumar Sanu
Maharaja	1252	"Maharaja" (Duet)	Nadeem - Shravan	Udit Narayan
Maharaja	1253	"Mera Pyara Mukhda"	Nadeem - Shravan	Shankar Mahadevan
Maharaja	1254	"Jab Tum Aa Jaate Ho"	Nadeem - Shravan	Sonu Nigam
Maharaja	1255	"Ishq Mohabbat"	Nadeem - Shravan	Solo
Maharaja	1256	"Maharaja" (Female)	Nadeem - Shravan	Solo
Main Phir Aaongi	1257	"Haseenayein Zulfon Ka Phanda Bichayein"	Sameer Shyam	Mohd Aziz
Main Solah Baras Ki	1258	"Sach Hua Hai Sapna"	Rajesh Roshan	Kumar Sanu
Main Solah Baras Ki	1259	"Pal Yeh Kehata Hai"	Rajesh Roshan	Alka Yagnik; Kumar Sanu; Udit Narayan
Manmohini	1260	"Jab Se Tera Pyar"	Bappi Lahiri	Vinod Rathod
Manmohini	1261	"Uyee Ma Uyee Meri"	Bappi Lahiri	Solo
Manmohini	1262	"Uyee Maa Meri" (Sad)	Bappi Lahiri	Solo
Mard	1263	"Aaj Kisi Ki Jeet Hui Hai"	Dilip Sen - Sameer Sen	Mohammed Aziz
Mehndi	1264	"Tum to Pardesi"	Babul Bose	Solo
Mil Gayee Manzil Mujhe	1265	"Aayee Neend"	Bhupen Hazarika	Solo
Mil Gayee Manzil Mujhe	1266	"Shaam Dhali Ban Mein"	Bhupen Hazarika	Udit Narayan
Mohabbat Aur Jung	1267	" Humko to Pyar Hue Gawa"	Dilip Sen - Sameer Sen	Kumar Sanu
Mohabbat Aur Jung	1268	"Pyar Hi Pyar Hai"	Dilip Sen - Sameer Sen	Udit Narayan
Naseeb	1269	"Seene Pe Rakh Ke"	Nadeem - Shravan	Udit Narayan
Pardesi Babu	1270	"Pada Jeena Tere Bin Meri Jaan"	Anand Raaj Anand	Seema Anil Sehgal; Udit Narayan
Pardesi Babu	1271	"Kya Hai Pyar Bataao Naa"	Anand Raaj Anand	Udit Narayan
Phir Wohi Awaaz	1272	"Mere Bangle Ka Tala"	Kamalkant	Solo
Phir Wohi Awaaz	1273	"Mera Chikna Badan"	Kamalkant	Solo
Phool Bane Patthar	1274	"Main Hoon Haseena"	Shyam - Surender	Kavita Paudwal
Prem Aggan	1275	"Hum Tumse Mohabbat Karte Hain"	Anu Malik	Udit Narayan
Pyaar Kiya to Darna Kya	1276	"Oh Baby"	Sajid - Wajid	Udit Narayan
Saat Rang Ke Sapne	1277	"Mujh Pe Bhi Jawani"	Nadeem - Shravan	Kunal Ganjawala
Saaz	1278	"Kya Tum Ne Hai Kah Diya"	Zakir Hussain	Zakir Hussain
Saaz	1279	"Raat Dhalne Lagi"	Zakir Hussain	Zakir Hussain
Saaz	1280	"Nindya Hai Sapna Hai"	Zakir Hussain	Raj Kamal
Saaz	1281	"Baadal Ghumad Badh Aaye"	Zakir Hussain	Yashwant Dev
Saazish	1282	"Khushi Ka Rang"	Jatin - Lalit	Bali Bramhabhatt; Abhijeet
Sham Ghansham	1283	"Oh No"	Vishal Bharadwaj	Hariharan
Sher Khan	1284	Good Evening Good Evening	Bappi Lahiri	Solo
Sikandar Sadak Ka	1285	"Meinu Pad Gaye"	Dilip Sen - Sameer Sen	Udit Narayan; Abhijeet
Suryakaant	1286	"Gora Rang Tera Gori	Mahesh - Kishore	Udit Narayan
Suryakaant	1287	"Gigaa Digaa Dum Dum"	Mahesh - Kishore	Kumar Sanu
Swami Vivekananda	1288	"Tava Birahe Vanamaali Sakhi"	Salil Chowdhary	Solo
Swami Vivekananda	1289	"Prabhuji More Abgun Chit Na Dharo"	Salil Chowdhary	Solo
Vinashak – Destroyer	1290	"Chal Chal Chal"	Viju Shah	Udit Narayan
Vinashak – Destroyer	1291	"Dooba Dooba Dil"	Viju Shah	Solo
Wajood	1292	"Ki Toot Gayi"	Anu Malik	Sapna Awasthi
Wajood	1293	"Sanam Tum Hum Pe"	Anu Malik	Udit Narayan
Yeh Aashiqui Meri	1294	"Jo Bhi Dhundhungi"	Ajit Varman	Solo
Yugpurush	1295	"Ae Meri Jaan Main"	Rajesh Roshan	Sonu Nigam; Kavita Paudwal
Zor	1296	"Koi Dekh Raha"	Agosh	Udit Narayan
Zor	1297	"Gham Na Karo"	Agosh	Sonu Nigam

=== 1999 ===
Film	No	Song	Composer(s)	Co-artist(s)
Aaag Hi Aag	1298	"Teri Chaahat Ki Kasam"	Babul Bose	Udit Narayan
Aadhi Raat	1299	"Aaj Tum Mujhko Pyar Karo"	Karuna	Solo
Anari No. 1	1300	"A B C D E F G"	Dilip Sen - Sameer Sen	Udit Narayan
Anari No. 1	1301	"Paagal Mujhe Bana Gaya Hai"	Dilip Sen - Sameer Sen	Abhijeet
Anyay Hi Anyay	1302	"Yeh Jeevan Hai Pal Do Pal Ka"	R. D. Burman	Solo
Baghawat	1303	"Paagal Paagal Yeh Ladka"	Ghulam Ali Chander	Udit Narayan
Biwi No.1	1304	"Aan Milo Ya Milne Se"	Anu Malik	Udit Narayan
Captain Bhawani	1305	Chhoti-Chooti-Choriyan Se Dil Bhar Gaya	Vandemataram Srinivas	Vinod Rathod
Captain Bhawani	1306	"Begani Shadi Mein Dewane Do"	Vandemataram Srinivas	Vinod Rathod
Chambal Ki Kasam	1307	"Jaage Jaage Soote Hain"	Dilip Dutta	Kumar Sanu
Chambal Ki Kasam	1308	"Husn Ki Dekho Nazare"	Dilip Dutta	Solo
Dada	1309	"Aara Ra Re"	Ghulam Ali	Ila Arun
Devi (D)	1310	"Pyar Ka Mausam"	Devi Sri Prasad	Sonu Nigam
Devi (D)	1311	"Sabse Aacha Yeh Din"	Devi Sri Prasad	Sonu Nigam
Devi (D)	1312	"Chandrani Rudrani"	Devi Sri Prasad	Solo
Dil Ka Sauda	1313	"Hey Ambe Ambali Maa"	Baba Jagirdar	Solo
Dil Kya Kare	1314	"Monday Bhi Ho"	Jatin-Lalit	Abhijeet
Dillagi	1315	"Dillagi"	Shankar - Ehsaan - Loy	Alka Yagnik; Abhijeet; Udit Narayan; Sonu Nigam; Sukhwinder Singh; Shankar Mahadevan; Shaan; Mahalaxmi Iyer; Jaspinder Narula
Dulhan Banoo Main Teri	1316	Jadugar Jadugar	Raamlaxman	Udit Narayan
Dulhan Banoo Main Teri	1317	"Jadugar Jadugar" (Part 2 & 3)	Raamlaxman	Solo
Dulhan Banoo Main Teri	1318	"Mere Man Mein Hai Tu"	Raamlaxman	Solo
Dulhan Banoo Main Teri	1319	"Hare Krishna"	Raamlaxman	Solo
Gair (Shaktishali)	1320	"Mere Dil Ne Chupke"	Anand - Milind	Kumar Sanu
Ganga Ki Kasam	1321	"Hai Rabba Hai Rabba"	Bappi Lahiri	Solo
Godmother	1322	"Raja Ki Kahani"	Vishal Bharadwaj	Rekha Bharadwaj; Usha Iyer Uthup
Hai Kaun Woh	1323	"Magroor Hai Sajan"	Paul	Solo
Haseena Maan Jaayegi	1324	"Dulha Bhi Lajawab Hai"	Anu Malik	Sonu Nigam; Ram Shankar
Hote Hote Pyar Ho Gaya	1325	"Haiyo Hikko Nikko Ni" (Female)	Anand Raaj Anand; Pradeep; Ejaz	Solo
Hu Tu Tu	1326	"Nikla Neem Ke Talese Nikla"	Vishal Bharadwaj	Anuradha Paudwal; Roop Kumar Rathod
Hum Dil De Chuke Sanam	1327	"Nimbooda"	Ismail Darbar	Karsan Sagathia
Hum Dil De Chuke Sanam	1328	"Aankhon Ki Gustakhiyan"	Ismail Darbar	Kumar Sanu
Hum Dil De Chuke Sanam	1329	"Jhonka Hawa Ka"	Ismail Darbar	Hariharan
Hum Dil De Chuke Sanam	1330	"Dholi Taro Dhol Baaje"	Ismail Darbar	Vinod Rathod; Karsan Sagathia
Hum Dil De Chuke Sanam	1331	"Albela Sajan"	Ismail Darbar	Ustad Sultan Khan; Shankar Mahadevan
Hum Dil De Chuke Sanam	1332	"Hum Dil De Chuke Sanam"	Ismail Darbar	Mohammed Salamat; Dominique Cerejo
Hum Saath-Saath Hain	1333	"Mhare Hiwda"	Raam Laxman	Alka Yagnik; Anuradha Paudwal; Kumar Sanu; Udit Narayan; Hariharan
Hum Saath-Saath Hain	1334	"Chhote Chhote Bhaiyon Ke Bade Bhaiyya"	Raam Laxman	Udit Narayan; Kumar Sanu
Hum Saath-Saath Hain	1335	"Maiyya Yashoda"	Raam Laxman	Alka Yagnik; Anuradha Paudwal
Hum Saath-Saath Hain	1336	"Sunoji Dulhan Ek Baat Sunoji"	Raam Laxman	Roop Kumar Rathod; Pratima Rao; Udit Narayan; Sonu Nigam
Hum Saath-Saath Hain	1337	"Hum Saath-Saath Hain"	Raam Laxman	Alka Yagnik; Anuradha Paudwal; Kumar Sanu; Hariharan; Udit Narayan
Inteqam Aurat Ka	1338	Thumak Thumak Nache	Jeetu Tapan	Solo
Inteqam Aurat Ka	1339	"Dil Se Dil Jod Ke"	Jeetu Tapan	Solo
Inteqam Aurat Ka	1340	"Kal Chapegi Ek Khabar"	Jeetu Tapan	Solo
Jai Hind	1341	"Main Kya Hoon"	Laxmikant - Pyarelal	Alka Yagnik; Nitin Mukesh
Kaala Samrajya	1342	"Parda Haata De"	Anand - Milind	Solo
Khoobsurat	1343	"Nera Ek Sapna Hai"	Jatin - Lalit	Kumar Sanu
Khoobsurat	1344	"Ghoonghat Mein Chand"	Jatin - Lalit	Kumar Sanu
Kohram	1345	"Janeman Janeman"	Dilip Sen - Sameer Sen	Udit Narayan
Kranti Path	1346	"Jane Jaan Ujada Hamara"	Ram Shankar	Udit Narayan
Kranti Path	1347	"Jaane Jaan Ujada Hamara"	Ram Shankar	Solo
Kranti Path	1348	"Jane Jaan Ujjda Hamara" (Duet)	Ram Shankar	Udit Narayan
Kranti Path	1349	"Jane Jaan Ujjda Hamara" (Sad)	Ram Shankar	Udit Narayan
Kranti Path	1350	"Aankhon Se Peeya"	Ram Shankar	Abhijeet
Laawaris	1351	"Maine Jo Kahan"	Rajesh Roshan	Abhijeet
Lafdaa	1352	"Pyasa Hai Pal"	Nishad Vaidya	Solo
Lo Main Aa Gaya	1353	"Chak Tiki Dhum Dhum"	Anand Raaj Anand	Abhijeet
Lo Main Aa Gaya	1354	"Mujhe Chhooke Sajan Yeh Mast Pawan"	Anand Raaj Anand	Anand Raaj Anand
Lohpurush	1355	"Main Hoon Ashiq Aawara"	Dilip Sen - Sameer Sen	Udit Narayan; Ila Arun
Lohpurush	1356	"Tod Ke Pinjra"	Dilip Sen - Sameer Sen	Udit Narayan
Lohpurush	1357z	"Main Jat Ludhihane Wala" (Remix)	Dilip Sen - Sameer Sen	Udit Narayan; Ila Arun
Love You Hamesha	1358	"Ek Ladki Thi"	A. R. Rahman	Solo
Love You Hamesha	1359	"Sone Ka Palang"	A. R. Rahman	Udit Narayan; Kavita Paudwal; Ila Arun
Madam Don	1360	"Roothi Khushiyaan"	Nitin Kumar	Solo
Manchalaa	1361	"Pyara Pyara Pyar Ka Nasha"	Raam Laxman	Kumar Sanu
Manchalaa	1362	"Ae Mere Humsafar" (Female)	Raam Laxman	Solo
Mann	1363	"Kali Nagin Ke Jaisi"	Sanjeev - Darshan	Udit Narayan
Mother	1364	"Mother Mother"	Dilip Sen - Sameer Sen	Anuradha Paudwal
Mr. Romeo	1365	"Machhli Paani Bina"	A. R. Rahman	Solo
Nyaydaata	1366	"Is Dil Ke Khayalon Ko"	Shyam - Surender	Vinod Rathod
Nyaydaata	1367	"Kahte Hain Tumse"	Shyam - Surender	Vinod Rathod
Nyaydaata	1368	"Kisise Hogi Pehli"	Shyam - Surender	Solo
Phool Aur Aag	1369	"Saasein Mahek Rahi Hai"	Aditya - Sunny - Shaheen	Solo
Phool Aur Aag	1370	"Piya Piya Bole Jiya"	Aditya - Sunny - Shaheen	Vinod Rathod
Phool Aur Aag	1371	"Main Gaoon Dil Gaaye"	Aditya - Sunny - Shaheen	Achal
Safari	1372	"Arre Tu Hai"	Shyam - Mohan	Udit Narayan
Safari	1373	"Koo Koo"	Shyam - Mohan	Kumar Sanu
Sar Aankhon Par	1374	"Badi Jodo Ka"	Jatin - Lalit	Solo
Sar Aankhon Par	1375	"Zamana Ruke Par"	Jatin - Lalit	Sonu Nigam; Nitin Mukesh; Shraddha Pandit; Babul Supriyo
Sarfarosh	1376	"Yeh Jawani Hadh Kar De"	Jatin-Lalit	Solo
Sautela	1377	"Behna Ri Pyari Pyari Behna"	Tabun Sutradhar	Kumar Sanu
Sautela	1378	"Na Honge Hum Juda"	Tabun Sutradhar	Kumar Sanu
Shool	1379	"Aaya Mere Papa Ko"	Shankar - Ehsaan - Loy	Baby Anagha; Shankar Mahadevan
Taal	1380	"Ishq Bina - Ishq Bina"	A. R. Rahman	Sukhwinder Singh
Tabaahi-The Destroyer	1381	"Khuli Khuli Teri Zulfon Ne"	Tabun Sutradhar; Naresh Sharma; Mona Arun	Udit Narayan
Vaastav: The Reality	1382	"Meri Duniya Hai"	Jatin - Lalit	Sonu Nigam
Vaastav: The Reality	1383	"Tere Pyar Ne"	Jatin - Lalit	Solo
Yeh Hai Mumbai Meri Jaan	1384	"Tu Bada Ghazab Ka Yaar Hai"	Jatin-Lalit	Abhijeet Bhattacharya
Zimbo	1385	"Yaad Teri Aayegi"	Bappi Lahiri	Udit Narayan

== 2000s ==
=== 2000 ===
Film	No	Song	Composer(s)	Co-artist(s)
Aaj Ka Ravan	1386	"Haathon Ki Mehendi"	Pappu Pawan	Vibha Sharma; Udit Narayan
Aaj Ka Ravan	1387	"Jaane Jaa Janam"	Pappu Pawan	Babul Supriyo
Aashiq Hai to Dilber Ko Pehchan	1388	"Mujhko to Yeh Naughty"	Jayanta Pathak	Babul Supriyo
Aashiq Hai to Dilber Ko Pehchan	1389	"Ahista Ahista"	Jayanta Pathak	Babul Supriyo
Astitva	1390	"Main Thi Main Hoon"	Rahul Ranade	Solo
Astitva	1391	"Sabse Pehle Sangeet"	Sukhwinder Singh	Sukhwinder Singh
Baaghi	1392	"Khai Hai Kasam"(Duet)	Sajid–Wajid	Kumar Sanu
Baaghi	1393	"Khai Hai Kasam"	Sajid–Wajid	Solo
Baaghi	1394	"Tumhi Ko Chahata Hai"	Sajid–Wajid	Kumar Sanu
Baaghi	1395	"Khai Hai Kasam"	Sajid–Wajid	Kumar Sanu
Baaghi	1396	"Ek Kabhi Do Kabhi"	Sajid–Wajid	Solo
Badal	1397	"Na Milo Kahin Pyar"	Anu Malik	Sonu Nigam
Badal	1398	"Allah Allah"	Anu Malik	Anu Malik; Dominique Cerejo
Beti No.1	1399	"Dil Se Dil"	Ghulam Ali	Kumar Sanu
Beti No.1	1400	"Palkon Mein"	Ghulam Ali	Kumar Sanu
Biwi No 2 (D)	1401	"Chumma De Chumma De"	Sri Kommineni	Vinod Rathod
Biwi No 2 (D)	1402	"Ayega Ayega"	Sri Kommineni	Vinod Rathod
Bulandi	1403	"Teri Akhiyon Mein"	Viju Shah	Udit Narayan
Bulandi	1404	"Saari Duniya Mein"	Viju Shah	Udit Narayan; Chorus
Champion	1405	"Tu Kya Cheez Hai"	Anu Malik	Abhijeet
Champion	1406	"Na Baba Na Baba"	Anu Malik	Shankar Mahadevan
Dil Hi Dil Mein	1407	"Chand Aaya Hai"	A. R. Rahman	Udit Narayan
Dil Pe Mat Le Yaar	1408	"Jee Jee Jee"	Vishal Bharadwaj	Udit Narayan
Dil Pe Mat Le Yaar	1409	"Paagal"	Vishal Bharadwaj	Abhijeet
Ek Hi Manzil	1410	"Ek Hi Bhool"	Khayyam	Mohammed Aziz
Ek Hi Manzil	1411	"Tere Dil Ki Samajh"	Khayyam	Solo
Ek Hi Manzil	1412	"Aankhen Betaab Hai"	Khayyam	Suresh Wadkar
Ek Hi Manzil	1413	"Ajab Tarah Se"	Khayyam	Solo
Ek Naari Do Roop	1414	"Kisi Ka Mein Dil Hoon"	Arvinder Singh; Krishna Raj	Solo
Gaja Gamini	1415	"Meri Payal Bole"	Bhupen Hazarika	Solo
Gaja Gamini	1416	"O Hamara Hansa Gaya"	Bhupen Hazarika	Solo
Gaja Gamini	1417	"Do Sadiyon Ke Sangam"	Bhupen Hazarika	Udit Narayan
Hadh Kar Di Aapne	1418	"Hadh Kar Di Aapne"	Anand Raj Anand	Udit Narayan
Hamara Dil Aapke Paas Hai	1419	"Kya Maine Aaj Suna"	Sanjeev - Darshan	Vinod Rathod
Hello Hyderabad	1420	"Pyar Kya Hai"	Ahmed Mirza	Ahmed Mirza
Hera Pheri	1421	"Main Ladka Pom Pom"	Lalit Sen	Abhijeet
Jaal Saaz	1422	"Jantar Mantar Chhoo"	Dilip Sen - Sameer Sen	Abhijeet
Jaal Saaz	1423	Bada Bedardi"	Dilip Sen - Sameer Sen	Jolly Mukherjee
Jai Shakumbhari Maa	1424	"Aankhen Mundo Toh"	Ravindra Jain	Sonu Nigam
Jai Shakumbhari Maa	1425	"Hey She Made Me Crazy"	Ravindra Jain	Dilraj Kaur
Kabhi Tum Kabhi Hum	1426	"Akkdam Bakaddam"	Bhavdeep Jaipurwala	Solo
Kabrastan	1427	"Oye Oye Yun Na Mujhse Rootho"	Ghulam Ali	Solo
Kali Topi Lal Rumal	1428	"Tere Mere Pyar Ka Ho Gaya Elaan"	Dilip Sen - Sameer Sen	Kumar Sanu
Khiladi 420	1429	"Kaisa Yeh Pyaar Hai"	Sanjeev - Darshan	Kumar Sanu
Khiladi 420	1430	"Jaagte Hain Hum"	Sanjeev - Darshan	Sonu Nigam
Khiladi 420	1431	"Batthiyan Bujha Do"	Sanjeev - Darshan	Sonu Nigam
Kothewali	1432	"Kangana Kalai Mein"	Pappu Khan	Solo
Kya Kehna	1433	"Aey Dil Laya Hai Bahaar"	Rajesh Roshan	Hariharan
Kya Kehna	1434	"Dil Ka Koi Tukda" (Kya Kehna)	Rajesh Roshan	Hariharan
Kya Kehna	1435	"Aey Dil Laya Hai Bahaar" (Short)	Rajesh Roshan	Hariharan
Le Chal Apne Sang	1436	"Mumbai Ki Ladki Tara Yeh Tara"	Raamlaxman	Abhijeet
Le Chal Apne Sang	1437	"Raja Khaike to Dekho"	Raamlaxman	Sadhana Sargam
Mela	1438	"Durga Hai Meri Maa"	Anu Malik	Jaspinder Narula; Arvindar Singh; Mohammed Aziz; Tanvi Azmi
Mera Saaya	1439	"Dil Tod Ne Wale Kabhi"	Ghulam Ali; Chander	Solo
Mei Parchaien	1440	"Gir Gayi Bindiya Re"	Ghulam Ali; Chander	Solo
Mere Aagosh Mein	1441	"Yeh Jaam Hai"	Ghulam Ali	Solo
Mere Aagosh Mein	1442	"Tune Mujhe Chhua"	Ghulam Ali	Vinod Rathod
Mission Azad (D)	1443	"Pyaar Ka Ka Silsila"	Mani Sharma	Sukhwinder Singh
Mission Azad (D)	1444	"Kamsin Kamsin Kali Ho Tum"	Mani Sharma	Udit Narayan
Nidaan	1445	"Aaja Re Chanda"(Happy)	Rahul Ranade	Ravindra Sathe
Nidaan	1446	"Aaja Re Chanda"(Sad)	Rahul Ranade	Ravindra Sathe
Nidaan	1447	"Hum Aur Tum"	Rahul Ranade	Suresh Wadkar
Prince No. 1	1448	"Ganga Kinare"	Mani Sharma	Udit Narayan
Pukar	1449	"Kay Sera Sera"	A. R. Rahman	Shankar Mahadevan
Pukar	1450	"Sunta Hai Mera Khuda"	A. R. Rahman	Swarnalata; Udit Narayan
Pyaar Ki Umang	1451	"Aa Zara Deewane"	D. Shankar	Solo
Raat Rani	1452	"Jabse Meri Aankhen"	Afsar Harish	Solo
Sanam Tere Hain Hum (D)	1453	"Love to Live Live to Love"	Mani Sharma	Abhijeet
Sanam Tere Hain Hum (D)	1454	"Tu Hi Meri Manzil"	Mani Sharma	Kumar Sanu
Sultaan	1455	"Hai Soni Kudi"	Bappi Lahiri	Bali Bramhabhatt
Tapish	1456	"Chale Bhavar"	Kishore Sharma; Ashutosh-Dhruv	Solo
Tera Jadoo Chal Gaya	1457	"Qayamat Ho"	Ismail Darbar	Sonu Nigam
Tere Liye	1458	"Sonu Suno"	Jeet - Pritam	Sonu Nigam
Tere Liye	1459	"Chikna Ajnabi"	Jeet - Pritam	Sonu Nigam
Tere Liye	1460	"Jee Lenge"	Jeet - Pritam	Sonu Nigam; K K; Swastika
Tune Mera Dil le Liyaa (Pinjra)	1461	"Chamak Challo Tu Naach"	Mahesh - Kishore	Mohammed Aziz
Tune Mera Dil le Liyaa (Pinjra)	1462	"Kab Se Meetha Dard Jaga Hai"	Mahesh - Kishore	Udit Narayan
Tune Mera Dil le Liyaa (Pinjra)	1463	"Bajte Hain Majboor Hamari"	Mahesh - Kishore	Solo
Tune Mera Dil le Liyaa (Pinjra)	1464	"Jaanam O Jaanam"	Mahesh - Kishore	Arun Ingle
Yunhi Chup Chup	1465	"Tum Kab Aaoge"	Laxmikant - Pyarelal	Solo
Yunhi Chup Chup	1466	"Chaap Tilak"	Bhupinder	Vinod Rathod

=== 2001 ===
Film	No	Song	Composer(s)	Co-artist(s)
Afsana Dilwalon Ka	1467	"Yeh Aashiq Husnwalon Se"	Shyam - Surender	Udit Narayan
Afsana Dilwalon Ka	1468	"Ae Ishq Marhaba"	Shyam - Surender	Udit Narayan
Badla Aurat Ka	1469	"Aao Tumhe Sikhlaoon"	Kamalkant	Amit Kumar
Bollywood Calling	1470	"Sajanji Ghar Aaya"	Ashirward	Alka Yagnik; Kumar Sanu
Boond	1471	"Ik Boond Hoon Main"	Rajendra - Liyaqat	Solo
Censor	1472	"Ho Aaj Majboor Koi"	Jatin - Lalit	Vijayta Pandit Shrivastava; Vinod Rathod; Roop Kumar Rathod
Chingari Aur Sholay	1473	"Tutengi Meri Choodiyan"	Anand - Milind	Sadhana Sargam
Dal - The Gang	1474	"Nikle Jo Ghar Se"	Shyam-Surender	Solo
Daman	1475	"Gum Sum" (Female)	Bhupen Hazarika	Solo
Daman	1476	"Hu Hu Pagal Pawan"	Bhupen Hazarika	Shaan
Dial 100	1477	"Phoolon Mein Tu Nazar Aaye"		Kumar Sanu
Dil Aa Gaya	1478	"Dhadak Dhadak Jaye Man"	Nandan Singh	Kumar Sanu
Dil Aa Gaya	1479	"Sun Sajana Mera Kangana"	Nandan Singh	Abhijeet
Dil Aa Gaya	1480	"Priyatama Tu Hain Kahan"	Nandan Singh	Suresh Wadkar
Dil Aa Gaya	1481	"Dil Se Milte Hi Sanam"	Nandan Singh	Vinod Rathod
Dil Chahta Hai	1482	"Woh Ladki Hai Kahan"	Shankar - Ehsaan - Loy	Shaan
Dil Churaya Aapne	1483	"Sundari"	Suresh Wadkar	Udit Narayan
Dil Churaya Aapne	1484	"Yeh Hai Mumbai Nagaria"	Suresh Wadkar	Udit Narayan
Dil Churaya Aapne	1485	"Tere Badle"	Suresh Wadkar	Kumar Sanu
Dil Ne Phir Yaad Kiya	1486	"Dupatta Sambhal Ke"	Aadesh Shrivastava	Vinod Rathod
Grahan	1487	"Kehte Hain Jis Ko"	Karthik Raaja	Abhijeet
Grahan	1488	"Nacho Jaise"	Karthik Raaja	Solo
Heroine No. 1	1489	"Aaja Mera Raja"	Babu Kisan	Sujata; Pamela Jain; Kavita Paudwal
Heroine No. 1	1490	"Thodi Whiskey Thoda Rum"	Babu Kisan	Sujata; Pamela Jain; Kavita Paudwal
Inteqam	1491	"College Ke Pehle Saal Main"	Babu Kisan	Udit Narayan
Jaydev	1492	"Tu Pyar Nahin Karta"	Kishore Sharma	Solo
Jeetenge Hum	1493	"Yeh Dil Tha Deewana"	Viju Shah	Udit Narayan, Abhijeet Bhattacharya
Jo Dar Gaya Samjho Mar Gaya	1494	Sajan Balam Mere Dilbar	Panni Saigal	Solo
Kabhi Khushi Kabhi Gham	1495	"Bole Chudiyan"	Jatin - Lalit	Alka Yagnik; Amit Kumar; Udit Narayan; Sonu Nigam
Kabhi Khushi Kabhi Gham	1496	"Vande Matram"	Sandesh Shandilya	Usha Iyer Uthup
Kasam	1497	"O Sahiba"	Viju Shah	Udit Narayan
Master	1498	"Tum Mile Humse"	Viju Shah	Udit Narayan
Meri Adalat	1499	"Age Age Pyar Ki"	Babul Bose	Vinod Rathod
Mitti	1500	"Dhol Bajhe"	Ali Ghani	Udit Narayan; Mohammed Aziz
Mitti	1501	"Malum Nahin Mujhko"	Ali Ghani	Sonu Nigam; Vinod Rathod; Ali Gani
Moksha	1502	"Jaan Leva"	Rajesh Roshan	Sukhwinder Singh
Moksha	1503	"Jaan Leva" (Remix)	Rajesh Roshan	Sukhwinder Singh
Monsoon	1504	"Tum Hi Ho Mere Humnasheen"	Louis Banks	Hariharan; Kavita Paudwal
Naag Shakti (D)	1505	"Aa Gayee Tere Dwar Pe"	Hamsalekha	Solo
Nayak	1506	"Chalo Chale Mitwa"	A. R. Rahman	Udit Narayan
Nayak	1507	"Tu Achcha Lagta Hai"	A. R. Rahman	Hariharan
Nayak	1508	"Chalo Chale Purva"	A. R. Rahman	Udit Narayan
Pyaar Ishq Aur Mohabbat	1509	"Dono Taraf"	Viju Shah	Kumar Sanu; Rakesh Pandit
Pyaar Tune Kya Kiya	1510	"Jaana"	Sandeep Chowta	Sonu Nigam
Pyaar Zindagi Hai	1511	"Na Phoolon Ke Khilne Se"	Bali Bramhabhatt; Jaideep	Udit Narayan
Pyaar Zindagi Hai	1512	"Phoolon Ne Kaha"	Bali Bramhabhatt; Jaideep	Kumar Sanu
Pyaar Zindagi Hai	1513	"Pyaar Zindagi Hai"		Kumar Sanu
Pyaasa	1514	"Aankhon Mein Leke Pyar"	Sanjeev - Darshan	Karsan Sagathia; Udit Narayan
Rahul	1515	"Ched Na Mukhko Meri Mehboob"	Anu Malik	Hariharan
Rani Hindustani	1516	"Oi Maa Oi Maa"	Bappi Lahiri	Solo
Rehnaa Hai Terre Dil Mein	1517	"Rehnaa Hai Terre Dil Mein"	Harris Jayraj	Sonu Nigam
Uljhan	1518	"Tu Na Ek Pal Ke Liye"	Aadesh Shrivastava	Kumar Sanu
Yaadein	1519	"Eli Re Eli"	Anu Malik	Alka Yagnik; Hema Sardesai
Yaadein	1520	"Chanda Taare"	Anu Malik	Sukhwinder Singh
Yeh Raaste Hain Pyaar Ke	1521	"Jo Pyaar Karta Hai"	Sanjeev - Darshan	Anuradha Paudwal; Manohar Shetty
Yehi To Pyar Hai	1522	"Don't Try To Love Me"	T Rajhenderr	Solo
Zubeidaa	1523	"Dheeme Dheeme"	A. R. Rahman	Solo
Zubeidaa	1524	"Main Albeli"	A. R. Rahman	Sukhwinder Singh

=== 2002 ===
Film	No	Song	Composer(s)	Co-artist(s)
Aankhen	1525	"Nazron Ne Teri"	Jatin-Lalit	Udit Narayan
Ansh: The Deadly Part	1526	"Sirf Sunday Ko"	Nadeem - Shravan	Solo
Badmaash No. 1	1527	"Dil Mein Ho Tum"	Bappi Lahiri	Kumar Sanu
Be-Lagaam	1528	"Swarg Ke Jaisa Roop Hai Tera"	Amar - Akbar	Udit Narayan
Bharat Bhagya Vidhata	1529	"Nighaon Mein Ho Tum"	Hriju Roy	Sonu Nigam
Chalo Ishq Ladaaye	1530	"Pyar Ka Fanda"	Himesh Reshammiya	Sonu Nigam
Deewangee	1531	"Pyar Se Pyare Tum Ho"	Ismail Darbar	Sonu Nigam
Deewangee	1532	"Saat Suron Ka"	Ismail Darbar	Udit Narayan
Deewangee	1533	"Saasein Saasein Hain"	Ismail Darbar	Sonu Nigam
Deewangee	1534	"Dholi O Dholi"	Ismail Darbar	Babul Supriyo
Deewangee	1535	"Saat Suron Ka"	Ismail Darbar	Solo
Devdas	1536	"Kaahe Chhed"	Ismail Darbar	Pandit Birju Maharaj; Madhuri Dixit
Devdas	1537	"Hamesha Tumko Chaaha"	Ismail Darbar	Udit Narayan
Devdas	1538	"Maar Daala"	Ismail Darbar	KK
Devdas	1539	"Dola Re Dola"	Ismail Darbar	Shreya Ghoshal; KK
Dil Hai Tumhaara	1540	"O Sahiba O Sahiba"	Nadeem - Shravan	Sonu Nigam
Dil Hai Tumhaara	1541	"Chhaya Hai Jo Dil"	Nadeem - Shravan	Shaan
Dil Mein Basakar Dekho	1542	"Pehli Nazar Kar Gai"	Shyam Sundar	Kumar Sanu
Dil Vil Pyar Vyar	1543	"Goom Hai Kisi Ke Pyar Mein"	Babloo Chakraborty	Hariharan
Dil Vil Pyar Vyar	1544	"Kya Jaanoo Sajan"	Babloo Chakraborty	Solo
Ghaav: The Wound	1545	Aate Jaate Yeh Haa	Suresh Raheja	Kumar Sanu
Great Target	1546	Sabse Bada Gyan	Ghulam Ali	Abhijeet
Humraaz	1547	"Pyaar Kar"	Himesh Reshammiya	Udit Narayan; Shaan
Jeena Sirf Merre Liye	1548	"Jeena Sirf Merre Liye"	Nadeem - Shravan	Alka Yagnik; Babul Supriyo
Jeena Sirf Merre Liye	1549	"Tu Hain Sola"	Nadeem - Shravan	Abhijeet
Junoon	1550	"Tere Liye Dhoopon Mein"	Aadesh Shrivastava	Kumar Sanu
Kaaboo	1551	"Main Tera Dil"	Anchal Talesara	Sonu Nigam
Kaante	1552	"Dil Kya Kare"	Anand Raaj Anand	Kumar Sanu
Karz: The Burden of Truth	1553	"Aashiqui Ban Ke"	Sanjeev - Darshan	Adnan Sami
Karz: The Burden of Truth	1554	"Mohabbat Hui Hai"	Sanjeev - Darshan	Kumar Sanu
Kehtaa Hai Dil Baar Baar	1555	"Dhol Baje"	Jatin - Lalit	Udit Narayan
Kehtaa Hai Dil Baar Baar	1556	"Jaane Kab Anjaane"	Jatin - Lalit	Kumar Sanu
Kitne Door Kitne Paas	1557	"Kitne Door Kitne Paas"	Sanjeev-Darshan	Udit Narayan
Kranti	1558	"Hayo Rabba"	Jatin-Lalit	Sonu Nigam
Kyaa Dil Ne Kahaa	1559	"Piya Pyaar Ye Kyon Kiya"	Himesh Reshammiya	Udit Narayan; Damayanti Bardai
Lady James Bond	1560	"Pal Do Pal Ki"	Shankar - Avadh	Hariharan
Love 2002	1561	"Tum Sa Haseen Maine Dekha Nahi"	Ghulam Ali	Udit Narayan
Maa Tujhe Salaam	1562	"Chham Chham Bole Paayal"	Sajid-Wajid	Udit Narayan
Maseeha	1563	"Jeena Teri Baahon Mein"	Anand Raaj Anand	Solo
Maseeha	1564	"Gal Suno Sardarji"	Anand Raaj Anand	Anand Raaj Anand
Mitr	1565	"Jaane Wafaa" (Duet)	Illaiyaraaja	Sukhwinder Singh
Mitr	1566	"Mere Sapne"	Illaiyaraaja	Solo
Mohabbat Ho Gayi Hai Tumse	1567	"Mere Sanam"	Sanjeev - Darshan	Shaurin Bhatt
Om Jai Jagadish	1568	"Love Story"	Anu Malik	Shaan; Abhijeet
Pitaah	1569	"Nadiya Kinare Aao"	Anand Raaj Anand	Sonu Nigam
Pitaah	1570	"Humko to Ishq"	Anand Raaj Anand	Solo
Pyaar Bina Kya Jeena	1571	"Koi Akhiyan Mila Ka"	Sudhakar Sharma	Solo
Pyaasa	1572	"Aankhon Mein Leke Pyaar"	Sanjeev-Darshan	Udit Narayan
Pyaar Diwana Hota Hai	1573	"Pyaar Diwana Hota Hai"	Uttam Singh	Udit Narayan
Pyar Ki Dhun	1574	"Meri In Aankhon Mein..."	Shantanu Moitra	Abhijeet
Qaidi	1575	"Teri Bali Umar Pe Mar Java"	Bappi Lahiri	Sukhwinder Singh; Bali Brahmbhatt
Rang Mahal	1576	"Aaja Re Aaja"	Ghulam Ali Chander	Solo
Rang Mahal	1577	"Hello My Darling"	Ghulam Ali Chander	solo
Rishtey	1578	"Yaara Re Yaara Re"	Sanjeev - Darshan	Sonu Nigam
Shaheed Bhagat Singh	1579	"Chhup Chhup Ke Zamaane"	Jaidev Kumar	Solo
Shaheed e Azam	1580	"Aao Ni Saiyo" (Khori)	Makbool Khan - Sabar Ali - Sardool Sikander	Jaspinder Narula; Sardool Sikandar
Shakti: The Power	1581	"E Chand"	Ismail Darbar	Solo
Shakti: The Power	1582	"Hum Tum Miley" (Female)	Ismail Darbar	Solo
Tum Jiyo Hazaron Saal	1583	"Paas Rahkar Bhi Koi Paas Na Ho"	Jatin - Lalit	Solo
Tum Jiyo Hazaron Saal	1584	"Lippo Ram"	Jatin - Lalit	Solo
Waah! Tera Kya Kehna	1585	"Waah Tera Kya Kehna"	Jatin - Lalit	Roop Kumar Rathod
Yeh Mohabbat Hai	1586	"Yeh Dil Deewana Hai"	Anand Raaj Anand	Abhijeet

=== 2003 ===
Film	No	Song	Composer(s)	Co-artist(s)
Adharm	1587	"Maine Kabhi Socha Nahin"	Rajendra Shiv	Sonu Nigam
Adharm	1588	"Jaane Kiye Kya Tune Ishara"	Rajendra Shiv	Sonu Nigam
Aisa Kyon	1589	"Dil Dil Dil"	Raam Laxman	Solo
Aisa Kyon	1590	"Bam Chik Bam Chik"	Raam Laxman	Kumar Sanu
Baaz	1591	"Tujhe Paake"	Ismail Darbar	Mohd Salamat
Calcutta Mail	1592	"Bheegi Bheegi Hawa Hai"	Viju Shah	Shaan
Choron Ka Chor	1593	"Aaja O Rasiya"	Mani Sharma	Babul Supriyo
Dabdaba	1594	"Aayee Hai Bahaar"	Dilip Dutta; Ravi	Udit Narayan
Escape from Taliban	1595	"Ae Jaan-E-Jaa"	Babul Bose	Udit Narayan
Ek Hindustani	1596	"Chalo Achchha"	Anand Raaj Anand	Udit Narayan
Jodi Kya Banai Wah Wah Ramji	1597	"Ek to Baarish"	Anand Raaj Anand	Anand Raaj Anand
Kaise Kahoon Ke Pyaar Hai	1598	"Kaise Kahoon Ke Pyaar Hai"	Viju Shah	Udit Narayan
Khanjar	1599	"Bin Sajni Ke Jeevan"	Amar - Utpal	Udit Narayan
Khel	1600	"Pyar Hone Laga"	Dude's Music Company	Kumar Sanu
Koi... Mil Gaya	1601	"En Panchhiyon"	Rajesh Roshan	Baby Sneha; Shaan
Kuch Na Kaho	1602	"Achchi Lagti Ho"	Shankar - Ehsaan - Loy	Udit Narayan
Love at Times Square	1603	"Aisa Ho Koi"	Lucky Ali	Solo
Love at Times Square	1604	"Ye Raste Yeh Masti"	Lucky Ali	Lucky Ali
Maa Santoshi Maa	1605	Vishwas Ki Jyot Jalakar	Vishwajeet	Udit Narayan
Maa Santoshi Maa	1606	"Vrat Tumhara Jo Kare"	Vishwajeet	Udit Narayan
Mudda	1607	"Khwabon Ki"	Jeet Ganguly, Pritam Chakraborty	solo
Pinjar	1608	"Shaba Ni Shaba"	Uttam Singh	Sadhana Sargam; Udit Narayan
Qayamat	1609	Dil Chura Liya	Nadeem - Shravan	Abhijeet
Raghu Romeo	1610	"Main Mamooli Aadmi"	Pritam	Kunal Ganjawala
Raja Bhaiya	1611	Tu Jo Hans Hans Ke	Nadeem - Shravan	Udit Narayan
Yeh Dil	1612	"Hey Kya Ladki"	Nadeem - Shravan	Abhijeet

=== 2004 ===
Film	No	Song	Composer(s)	Co-artist(s)
Agnipankh	1613	"Janmabhoomi"	Pritam Chakraborty	Solo
Asambhav	1614	Teri Dekh Dekh Ladkaiyan	Viju Shah	Udit Narayan
Hatya	1615	"Koyaliya Bole Kuhu Kuhu"	Nadeem–Shravan	Ahmed Mirza
Hello Hindustani	1616	"Chinappu Chinappu"	Ilaiyaraaja	Solo
Hello Hindustani	1617	"Radha O Radha"	Ilaiyaraaja	Kumar Sanu
Lakeer	1618	"Paighaam"	A. R. Rahman	Shaan
Meri Biwi Ka Jawaab Nahin	1619	Sab Pyaar Mohabbat Jhooth	Laxmikant - Pyarelal	Solo
Meri Biwi Ka Jawaab Nahin	1620	"Taron Ki Chaon Mein"	Laxmikant - Pyarelal	Abhijeet
Mission Azad	1621	"Sun Sun Sun Nakhrewali"	Mani Sharma	Udit Narayan
Mission Azad	1622	"Kamsin Kamsin Kali Ho Tum"	Mani Sharma	Udit Narayan
Mission Azad	1623	"Pyaar Ka Silsila"	Mani Sharma	Sukhwinder Singh
Mission Azad	1624	"Yeh Aarzoo"	Mani Sharma	Sonu Nigam
Sheen	1625	"Main Ladki Kashmir Ki"	Nadeem - Shravan	Solo
Vip	1626	"Mere Man Ke Meherban"	Ranjit Barot	K K; Vinod Rathod; Sadhana Sargam

=== 2005 ===
Film	No	Song	Composer(s)	Co-artist(s)
Aankhon Mein Sapne Liye	1627	"Na Na Na Na Karte"	Nillu Niranjana	Amit Kumar
Aankhon Mein Sapne Liye	1628	"Nafrat Aur Chahat"	Nillu Niranjana	Amit Kumar
Chand Bujh Gaya	1629	"Rehta Nahin Hai Chand Kabhi"	Ali Ghani	Solo
Chausar	1630	"Mere Dil Ki"	Sudeep Banerjee	Solo
Dreams	1631	"Dil Ki Dhadkan"	Arun Kerkar	Solo
Gehri Chaal	1632	"Jaiyo Jaiyo Re Saiyan"	Surender Sodhi - Rajendra Salil	Solo
Hot Mashooka	1633	"Angoor Ka Dana Hoon"	Madan Atram	Solo
Main, Meri Patni Aur Woh	1634	"Yeh Kya Ho Raha Hai"	Nayab Raja	Solo
Mangal Pandey: The Rising	1635	"Main Vari Vari"	A. R. Rahman	Reena Bhardwaj
My Brother... Nikhil	1636	"Mere Sapne"	Viveck Philip	Solo
Taj Mahal: An Eternal Love Story	1637	"Ishq Ki Daastaan"	Naushad	Preeti Uttam
Yehi Hai Zindagi	1638	"Pairon Ko Pankh Lagake"	Arvind Haldipur	Solo
Zameer: The Fire Within	1639	"Dil Ye Duaa De"	Jatin - Lalit	Udit Narayan
Zameer: The Fire Within	1640	"Kum Nahin Kisi Se"	Jatin - Lalit	Solo

=== 2006 ===
Film	No	Song	Composer(s)	Co-artist(s)
Baabul	1641	"Gaa Re Mann"	Aadesh Shrivastava	Alka Yagnik; Sudesh Bhosle; Kailash Kher
Ek Aur Amar Premm	1642	"Maine Apna Jeevan Saathi Chun Liya"	Ravindra Jain	Solo
Meri Majboori	1643	"Yeh Jaam Hai"	Bappi Lahiri	Solo
Umar	1644	'Duniyawalon Ko Nahi Kuch Bhi Khabar"	Shamir Tandon	Manna Dey; Sonu Nigam; Shadab Sabri
Vidyaarthi	1645	"E Malik Tu De"	Anand Raaj Anand	Solo

=== 2007 ===
Film	No	Song	Composer(s)	Writer(s)	Co-artist(s)
Meri Taaqat	1646	"Kai Raaz Khole Dil Ka"	R K Mishra		Babul Supriyo
Meri Taaqat	1647	"Pyaar Mein Hum Tadapne Lage"	R K Mishra		Solo
Meri Taaqat	1648	"Taka Dhin"	Ramana Gogula		Udit Narayan
Old Is Gold	1649	"Kya Daam Hai Tumhara"	Ismail Darbar		Sonu Nigam

=== 2008 ===
Film	No	Song	Composer(s)	Co-artist(s)
Heroes	1650	"Mannata"	Sajid - Wajid	Sonu Nigam
Heroes	1651	"Mannata" (Lover's Paradise Mix)	Sajid - Wajid	Sonu Nigam
Mehbooba	1652	"Kuchh Kar Lo" (I)	Ismail Darbar	Shankar Mahadevan
Mehbooba	1653	"Kuchh Kar Lo" (III)	Ismail Darbar	Solo
Mere Garib Nawaz	1654	"Dil Todnewale"	Ghulam Ali	Solo
Mere Garib Nawaz	1655	"Mil Jayen Darekaba"	Ghulam Ali	Solo
Mission	1656	"Mere Seene Ki Betaabiyon"	Khayyam	Solo
Mission	1657	"Zindagi Jo Hai Bachi"	Khayyam	Solo
Mission	1658	"Tujhe Gulaab Kiya Pesh"	Khayyam	Udit Narayan
Mission	1659	"Ishq Mein Humne"	Khayyam	Solo
Yaar Meri Zindagi	1660	"Raat Ko Akele Mein"	R. D. Burman	Solo

=== 2009 ===
Film	No	Song	Composer(s)	Co-artist(s)
Chal Chalein	1661	"Chal Chal Chal Ke"	Illaiyaraaja	Krishna, Aditya Narayan
Dekh Bhai Dekh	1662	"Kanha de Do Saran"	Nayab Raja	Udit Narayan
Tera Mera Ki Rishta		"Jag Khasma Nu Khaave"	Jaidev Kumar	Preeti Uttam Singh
Pal Pal Dil Ke Ssaat	1663	"Pal Pal Dil Ke Ssaat"	Abhishek Ray	Abhijeet
Pal Pal Dil Ke Ssaat	1664	"Ye Dhadkan Yeh Dil Ki Zuban"	Abhishek Ray	Abhijeet
Pal Pal Dil Ke Ssaat	1665	"Jaane Kya Baat Huwi"	Abhishek Ray	Solo
Pal Pal Dil Ke Ssaat	1666	"Jab Se Dekha Tujhko Sanam"	Abhishek Ray	Palash Sen
Pal Pal Dil Ke Ssaat	1667	"Meri Baat Suno"	Shibu - Pintu	Solo

== 2010s ==
=== 2010 ===
Film	No	Song	Composer(s)	Co-artist(s)
Road to Sangam	1668	Allah Ishwar Naam Tero	Sandesh Shandilya	Solo
Yeh Sunday Kyun Aata Hai	1669	Chadkar Girna	Kumar Sanu	Solo

=== 2011 ===
Film	No	Song	Composer(s)	Co-artist(s)
Humraah the Traitor	1670	"Kabhi Ekrar Hai"	Krishna Pandit	Solo
Humraah the Traitor	1671	"Kaise Raaj Khole Dil"	Krishna Pandit	Babul Supriyo
Milta Hai Chance By Chance	1672	"Hai Rang Roop"	Jatin - Lalit	Solo
Mohabbat the Taj	1673	"Holi Hai"	Vivek - Prakash	Udit Narayan
Mohabbat the Taj	1674	"Kalindi"	Vivek - Prakash	Solo
Mohabbat the Taj	1675	"Mujra"	Vivek - Prakash	Kalpana
Rivaaz	1676	"Sajna O Sajna"	Raj Inder Raj - Reeg Dev	Sandip Jain
Rockstar	1677	"Tum Ko"	A. R. Rahman	Solo
Shraddha	1678	"Kab Hogi Mujh Pe"	Dinesh Arjuna	Solo
Shraddha	1679	"Sada Zindagi Me"	Dinesh Arjuna	Solo

=== 2012 ===
Film	No	Song	Composer(s)	Co-artist(s)
Baashha	1680	"Chahra Hain Tera Sunder"	Devaa	Solo
Baashha	1681	"Chahre Pe Dhup"	Devaa	K. J. Yesudas
Main Hoon Durga	1682	"Masoom Sa Chehra"	Ravindra Jain	Suresh Wadkar
The Real Life On Mandi	1683	"Kardi Hawale Tere Maine"	Dinesh Arjuna	Solo

=== 2013 ===
Film	No	Song	Composer(s)	Co-artist(s)
Aaja Mere Mehboob	1684	"Hilori Hilori Uthe"	S G Varma	Solo
Aaja Mere Mehboob	1685	"Sawan Ke Jhoole Sajan Ki Bahein"	S G Varma	Solo
Mahabharat Aur Barbareek	1686	"Raksha Raksha Kalika"	Ravindra Jain	Solo
The Light: Swami Vivekananda	1687	"Kaise Kahu Maan Ki Batiya"	Nachiketa; Haricharan Verma	Solo
The Light: Swami Vivekananda	1688	"Parbhu Ji More Aaugan Chit Na Dharo"	Nachiketa; Haricharan Verma	Solo

=== 2014 ===
Film	No	Song	Composer(s)	Co-artist(s)
Anuradha	1689	"Muskurane Ke Bahane"	Farzan Faaiz	Solo
Bazaar E Husn	1690	"Pyaar Ki Duniya Basai Hai"	Khayyam	Udit Narayan
Bazaar E Husn	1691	"Aabru Laaj Saram"	Khayyam	Udit Narayan
Bazaar E Husn	1692	"Har Shaam Nigaahon Se"	Khayyam	Alka Yagnik
Darr Ke Aage Jeet Hai	1693	"Jab Dil Machal Jaata Hai"	Nikhil Kamath	Kumar Sanu
Kahin Hai Mera Pyar	1694	"Nach Baliye"	Ravindra Jain	Sukhwinder Singh
Naari Teri Shakti Anokhi	1695	"Meri Maa Se Mila De"		Solo

=== 2015 ===
Film	No	Song	Composer(s)	Co-artist(s)
Gour Hari Dastaan	1696	"Babul Mora"	L. Subramaniam	Solo
Gour Hari Dastaan	1697	"Vaishnava Janato"	L. Subramaniam	Solo
Ardhangini	1698	Meri Sindagi Ka Mita Nasha"		Solo
Ardhangini	1699	"Tumhen Chahti Hoon"		

=== 2016 ===
Film	No	Song	Composer(s)	Co-artist(s)	
Black Ticket	1700	"Maine Chaha Tho Bahut Tha"	Sarthak Chintu Kalla	Natesan Muni	Solo

=== 2017 ===
Film	No	Song	Composer(s)	Writer(s)	Co-artist(s)
Tumhari Sulu	1701	"Hawa Hawai 2.0"	Tanishk Bagchi	Javed Akhtar	Solo

== 2020s ==
=== 2021 ===
Film	No	Song	Composer(s)	Co-artist(s)
Pyaar Bina Kya Jeena	1702	"Jitni Door"		Kumar Sanu

=== 2024 ===
Film	No	Song	Composer(s)	Co-artist(s)
Sabarmati Report	1703	"Raja ram"	kartik kush	Suresh Wadkar

== Non-film Hindi songs ==
Year	Album	Song	Composer(s)	Co-artist(s)
1991	Pudi Kachawri Achar Ho	"Buddhu Anari Chhalia"		Mohammad Aziz
1991	Pudi Kachawri Achar Ho	"Rimjhim Badra Barse"		solo
1996	Crucial Jam – The Album	"Aankhon Mein Neend"	Rhythm Squad and EWC	Jolly Mukherjee
1996	Simply Love	"Hum Milke Chalenge"	Danny Choranji	Kumar Sanu
1996	Simply Love	"Romance"	Danny Choranji	solo
1996	Simply Love	"Dil Deewana"	Danny Choranji	solo
2011	Mohabbat The Taj	"Kalindi"		solo
2011	Mohabbat The Taj	"Mujra"		Kalpana Patwary
2011	Mohabbat The Taj	"Holi Hai"		Udit Narayan

=== Hindi television songs ===
Year	TV series	Song name(s)	Music director(s)	Lyricist	Co-singer(s)
1989	Kaash	"Kitne Tanha The Hum"			Kumar Sanu
1993	Alif Laila (Hindi)	"Alif Laila"	Ravindra Jain		Mohammad Aziz
1993	Alif Laila (Bengali)	"Alif Laila"	Ravindra Jain		Shabbir Kumar
1994	Junoon	"Mohabbat Ki Adaon Se"			Kumar Sanu
1994	Kismat	"Tumhe Dil Kahoon Sanam"	Dilip Sen-Sameer Sen		Kumar Sanu

== Bengali songs ==
=== Film songs ===
Year	Film	Song	Composer(s)	Songwriter(s)	Co-artist(s)	
1985	Maharudra	"Anga Sangame"	Bappi Lahiri		K J Yesudas	
1987	Ekanto Apon	"Khelbo Holi Rong Debona"	R D Burman	Pulak Banerjee	Asha Bhosle	
1988	Chhoto Bou	"Ek Jonom Dukhi Duyoranir"			solo	
1988	Chokher Aloy	"Oi Shono Pakhio Bolche" (female)	Bappi Lahiri		solo	
1988	Chokher Aloy	"Oi Shono Pakhio Bolche" (duet)	Bappi Lahiri		Bappi Lahiri	
1988	Surer Akashe	"Hothat Amay Fele"	Sapan Chakraborty		solo	
1988	Toofan	"Bashbo Bhalo Rakhbo Dhore"			Shakti Thakur, Haimanti Shukla	
1989	Amar Prem	"Aar Amake Khuku Bole Dekona"	Bappi Lahiri	Pulak Banerjee	solo	
1989	Amar Tumi	"Bhalobashi Bhalobashi"	Bappi Lahiri	Bappi Lahiri	Pulak Banerjee	Amit Kumar
1989	Asha O Bhalobasha	"O Pahar O Jongol"	Bappi Lahiri	Pulak Banerjee	solo	
1989	Bidhira Bidhan	"Bou Shudu Dhei"	Akshaya Mohanty			
1989	Bidhira Bidhan	"Maa Tomar Sinthi"	Akshaya Mohanty	Chandrani Mukherjee		
1989	Chokher Aloy	"Oi Shono"(Female)	Bappi Lahiri			
1989	Mandanda	"Ektu Porei Ei Ratri Seshe"	Sapan Chakraborty		Amit Kumar	
1989	Maryada	"Pathe Jete Jete"	Babul Bose		solo	
1989	Mone Mone	"Mono Mono Aajo Sei"	Kanu Bhattacharya		Bhupendar Singh	
1989	Pronami Tomay	"Sakal Hote Na Hote"	Bappi Lahiri	Pulak Banerjee	Md Aziz	
1989	Toofan	"Basbo Bhalo"	Sapan Chakraborty		Shakti Takur, Haimanti Shukla	
1990	Agnidaha	"Phool Phool Bhomora"	Bappi Lahiri	Pulak Banerjee	solo	
1990	Agnidaha	"Sujon Tumi Chara"	Bappi Lahiri	Pulak Banerjee	Udit Narayan	
1990	Amar Bodhua	"Amar Nisshase Tumi"	Bappi Lahiri	N/A	solo	
1990	Amar Bodhua	"Kopale Chondon"	Bappi Lahiri	N/A	Abhijeet Bhattacharya	
1990	Bhangagara	"Akhuni Shamuhdhoze"	Ravindra Jain	Md Aziz		
1990	Debota	"Bochor Ghure Elore Phagun"	R D Burman		Asha Bhosle, Shailendra Singh, Amit Kumar	
1990	Hingsa	"Mon Shunte Ki Chay"			Kumar Sanu	
1990	Mahajan	"Tuki Tuki Tuki"	Swapan Chakraborty	Arpita		
1990	Nyay Danda	"Dorjata Bondho"	N/A	N/A	solo	
1990	Nyay Danda	"Ami Esechi Sathe Enechi"	N/A	N/A	solo	
1990	Qaidi	"Jaar Ektu Haanshi Te"(Sad)	Anu Malik	Md Aziz		
1990	Pitrireen	"Amar Payel Rinik Jhinik"			solo	
1990	Prem Songee	"Tumi Je Kokhon"			Kumar Sanu	
1990	Shubho Kamona	"Ei Je Tithi"	Ajoy Das		Kumar Sanu	
1990	Shubho Kamona	"Eseche Holi Re Aaj"	Ajoy Das		Kumar Sanu	
1991	Ahankar	"Paagri Kothay"	R D Burman	Bhavesh Kundu	chorus	
1991	Antarer Bhalobasha	"Hole Miya Bibi Raaji"	Bappi Lahiri	N/A	solo	
1991	Antarer Bhalobasha	"Eito Ami Ese Gechi"	Bappi Lahiri	N/A	solo	
1991	Bidhilipi	"Ki Je Kori Hayre Hay"	Swapan Chakraborty	Anjan Chowdhury	solo	
1991	Bhagyachakra	"Jole Na Na Mile"	Sumitra Lahiri	Mukul Dutt	Kumar Sanu	
1991	Bourani	"Kede Kede Bole Nari"	R D Burman	Bhavesh Kundu	Amit Kumar	
1991	Ek Poshla Brishti	"Ami Thaki Uttore"			Amit Kumar	
1991	Kotha Dilam	"Maa Ke Je Bhoy Kore"	Ajoy Das	Pulak Banerjee	solo	
1991	Kotha Dilam	"I Am A Romeo"	Ajoy Das	Pulak Banerjee	Amit Kumar	
1991	Mohashoy	"Asbar Kotha Jar"	Sapan-Jagmohan		solo	
1991	Pati Param Guru	"Swapne Swapne"	Ravindra Jain			
1991	Sadharan Meye	"Aabar Aami Natun Kore"	Kanu Bhattacharya	Pulak Banerjee	Amit Kumar	
1991	Shubha Kamana	"Asche Holly Re"	Ajoy Das		Kumar Sanu	
1991	Shubha Kamana	"Sundarirag Kare"	Ajoy Das		Kumar Sanu	
1992	Adhikaar	"Moner Mansuh Ekbari"	R D Burman	Pulak Banerjee	solo	
1992	Anutap	"Bodhoy Temon Bhalobaste Parchina"	Bappi Lahiri		Kumar Sanu	
1992	Apon Por	"Chokhe Chokhe Je Kotha"	Bappi Lahiri	Pulak Banerjee	Kumar Sanu	
1992	Bahadur	"Bahadur Bahadur"	N/A	N/A	solo	
1992	Bahadur	"Bhabini To Amar Mone"	N/A	N/A	solo	
1992	Bahadur	"Sure Sure Mishe Praan"	N/A	N/A	Usha Uthup	
1992	Gunjan	"Amake Dharo Apan Karo"	Kishore Desai	Pulak Banerjee	solo	
1992	Gunjan	"Ekdin Konodin Ei Din Bhabini"	Kishore Desai	Pulak Banerjee	Kumar Sanu	
1992	Maa	"Se Je Maa"	R D Burman		solo	
1992	Mashooq	"Ei Mon Tomake Diyechi"	Nadeem–Shravan	Pulak Banerjee	Kumar Sanu	
1992	Mashooq	"Ei Spondon Ei Buker"	Nadeem–Shravan	Pulak Banerjee	Kumar Sanu	
1992	Mashooq	"Bujhbe Sedine"	Nadeem–Shravan	Pulak Banerjee	Kumar Sanu	
1992	Mashooq	"O Bondhu"	Nadeem–Shravan	Pulak Banerjee	Kumar Sanu	
1992	Mashooq	"Ke Tumi Je"	Nadeem–Shravan	Pulak Banerjee	Abhijeet Bhattacharya	
1992	Mayabini	"Ei Jivanta Jeno"	Tanmoy Chattopadhoy			
1992	Natun Sansar	"Tumi Bolona Kothay"			Kumar Sanu	
1992	Mon Mane Na	"Kane Kane Boli"	Babul Bose		Kumar Sanu	
1992	Mon Mane Na	"Hamida Banu Kore Kushti"	Babul Bose		Kumar Sanu	
1992	Priya	"Pasa Pasi Bari Ache"	Bappi Lahiri		Abijeet Bhattacharya	
1992	Prothom Dekha	"Duti Mon Jokhoni Haay"	Arpita Raj	Lakhikanta Ray	solo	
1992	Prothom Dekha	"Tumi Je Amari Jibon"	Arpita Raj	Lakhikanta Ray	Kumar Sanu	
1992	Puroskar	"Paira Chanda Machh"	R D Burman	Bhavesh Kundu	Abhijeet Bhattacharya	
1992	Rakte Lekha	"Ami Kolkatar Rosogolla"	Bappi Lahiri	Pulak Banerjee	solo	
1992	Shwet Patharer Thala	"Bhalobashi Bhalobashi"	Rabindranath Tagore		solo	
1992	Sorbojoya	"Chander Aloy"	Swapan Chakraborty	Pulak Banerjee	solo	
1993	Aankhen (Dubbed)	"O Lal Boshona Konna"	Bappi Lahiri	Pulak Banerjee	Sudesh Bhosle, Babul Supriyo and Anupama Deshpande	
1993	Amar Saathi	"Bajare Khol"	Mrinal Banerjee		Kumar Sanu	
1993	Anubhav	"Karuna Sagar Tumi"	Kanu Bhattacharya			
1993	Ashik Priya	"Prithibir Shurute Ami"	Bappi Lahiri	Pulak Banerjee	Kumar Sanu	
1993	Ashik Priya	"Tomar Aage Ar Keu Nei" (duet)	Bappi Lahiri	Pulak Banerjee	Kumar Sanu	
1993	Ashik Priya	"Prem Korechi Besh Korechi"	Bappi Lahiri	Pulak Banerjee	Bappi Lahiri	
1993	Ashik Priya	"I Am A Hot Cake"	Bappi Lahiri	Pulak Banerjee	solo	
1993	Atithi Shilpi	"Ei Shono Shonona"	N/A	N/A	solo	
1993	Aamar Saathi	"Bajare Khol"			Kumar Sanu	
1993	Aamar Saathi	"Tumi Amar"			Suresh Wadkar	
1993	Dalaal (dubbed)	"Ami Je Go Chupi Chupi"	Bappi Lahiri	Mukul Dutt	Kumar Sanu	
1993	Dan Protidan	"Bhabini To Ami Bhalobashbo"	Ajoy Das		solo	
1993	Duranto Prem	"Projapoti Keno Chhuye Chhuye Jay"	Arup Pranay	Pulak Banerjee	Kumar Sanu	
1993	Duranto Prem	"Tomar Thont Dukhana"	Arup Pranay	Pulak Banerjee	Kumar Sanu	
1993	Duranto Prem	"Brishti Name Brishti Thame"	Arup Pranay	Pulak Banerjee	solo	
1993	Ghar Sansar	"Tumi Chole Gele"	Prashanta Nanda	Pulak Banerjee	solo	
1993	Ghar Sansar	"O Amay Chou Tumi"	Prashanta Nanda	Pulak Banerjee	solo	
1993	Maya Mamata	"Mamata Meri Jaan"	Gautam Bose		Kumar Sanu	
1993	Maya Mamata	"Mayar Bandhan"	Gautam Bose			
1993	Prajapati	"Eso Eso Ghumer"	Mrinal Banerjee			
1993	Premi	"Ki Kore Chhilam"	Joydeb Sen		Kumar Sanu	
1993	Shakti	"Ai Alo To Amer"	Nayan Majumdar		Kumar Sanu	
1993	Shakti	"Tomar Kache"	Nayan Majumdar		Kumar Sanu	
1993	Shanka	"Aaj Ke Aamar"	Shyamal Banerjee		Kumar Sanu	
1993	Shanka	"O Priyo Ami Je"	Shyamal Banerjee		Shyamal Banerjee	
1993	Shradhanjali	"Bongodeshe Anka Koshe"	R. D. Burman			
1993	Sukher Swarga	"Sei Pratham"	Ajoy Das		Suresh Wadkar	
1993	Sukher Swarga	"Shono Boli"(Female)	Ajoy Das		Suresh Wadkar	
1993	Tomar Rokte Amar Sohag	"Tomar Rokte Amar Sohag"	Bappi Lahiri	Pulak Banerjee	solo	
1993	Tomar Rokte Amar Sohag	"Dub Dub Duburi"	Bappi Lahiri	Pulak Banerjee	solo	
1993	Tomar Rokte Amar Sohag	"Lal Tuk Tuk"	Bappi Lahiri	Pulak Banerjee	Abhijeet Bhattacharya	
1993	Tomar Rokte Amar Sohag	"Dub Dub Duburi"	Bappi Lahiri	Pulak Banerjee	Udit Narayan	
1994	1942: A Love Story	"Rimjhim Rinjhim"	R D Burman	Mukul Dutt	Kumar Sanu	
1994	1942: A Love Story	"Prem Elo Chup Shono"	R D Burman	Mukul Dutt	solo	
1994	Chorom Aghat	"Mone Mone Laglo Tokkor"	Alauddin Ali		Kumar Sanu	
1994	Dhushar Godhuli	"Jaago Jaago Sundor"	Bappi Lahiri		solo	
1994	Kalpurush	"Shono Shono Kaan Pete"	Kanu Bhattacharya	Birendra Maji	Kumar Sanu	
1994	Kalpurush	"Aaj Raate Ghum Asena"	Kanu Bhattacharya	Birendra Maji	solo	
1994	Kotha Chilo	"Haariye Jabo"	Bappi Lahiri		solo	
1994	Kotha Chilo	"Aami Tomar"	Bappi Lahiri		solo	
1994	Lal Pan Bibi	"Chhayake Jayna"			solo	
1994	Lal Pan Bibi	"O Dadu Samle"			solo	
1994	Lal Pan Bibi	"Sonar Pate Gaan"			solo	
1994	Lal Pan Bibi	"Premero Aaynate"			Kumar Sanu	
1994	Phiriye Dao	"Monje Kake Chay"	Bappi Lahiri		solo	
1994	Protyaghat	"Babara Keno Emon Hoy"	Bappi Lahiri	Bappi Lahiri		Kumar Sanu
1994	Rajar Raja	"Aakash Tarai Tarai"		Samit Bhanja, Subir Karanja		
1994	Rajar Raja	"Sara Raat"		Sudesh Bhosle		
1994	Rakta Nadir Dhara	"Oye Komo Ba"	Bappi Lahiri		Md Aziz, Bappi Lahiri	
1994	Rakta Nadir Dhara	"Tomar Buke"	Bappi Lahiri			
1994	Sagar	"Bondhu Amar"	Mrinal Benerjee		Udit Narayan	
1994	Tobu Mone Rekho	"Tomar Hatey"	Rocket Mondal		Arun Sen	
1994	Tobu Mone Rekho	"Miloner Raatey"	Rocket Mondal		Kumar Sanu	
1994	Tumi Je Aamar	"Tomar Chokheri Kajole"	Babul Bose	Pulak Banerjee	Abhijeet Bhattacharya	
1994	Tumi Je Aamar	"Koya Karva Loya Karulu"	Babul Bose	Pulak Banerjee	Udit Narayan	
1995	Abirbhab	"Ei Mon Diyechi"	Ajoy Das		Amit Kumar	
1995	Antaratama	"Ami Tomake"	Swapan Chakraborty	Pulak Banerjee	Kumar Sanu	
1995	Antaratama	"Rock And Roll"	Swapan Chakraborty	Pulak Banerjee	Kumar Sanu, Abhijeet	
1995	Antaratama	"Sab Katha Ki Mukhe"	Swapan Chakraborty	Pulak Banerjee	solo	
1995	Jibon Juddho	"Amar Ei Gaan"	Samir Mukherjee	N/A	solo	
1995	Jibon Juddho	"Amar Ei Gaan" (sad)	Samir Mukherjee	N/A	solo	
1995	Jibon Juddho	"Janla Bondho"	Samir Mukherjee	N/A	solo	
1995	Kumari Maa	"Ekta Kotha Bolbe Ki"	N/A	N/A	Kumar Sanu	
1995	Kumari Maa	"Amra Manush Chini"	N/A	N/A	solo	
1995	Priyo Tumi	"Jite Gechhi"	Alauddin Ali		Udit Narayan, Anuradha Paudwal	
1995	Prem Sanghat	"Tomar Mukhta Eto Chena"			Kumar Sanu	
1995	Rakhal Raja	"Chara Gache"	Ashok Bhadra		solo	
1995	Sangharsha	"Uttorpara Dakhinpara"	Bappi Lahiri		Md Aziz, Kumar Sanu	
1995	Sansar Sangram	"Kader Gharer"	Anupam Dutta		Udit Narayan	
1995	Sansar Sangram	"Faguner Gaan"(Female)	Anupam Dutta		solo	
1995	Sansar Sangram	"Sorry Sir Namoshkar"	Anupam Dutta		Udit Narayan	
1995	Sansar Sangram	"Tomar Mukher Hasi"	Anupam Dutta		Prabhakar	
1995	Sesh Pratiksha	"Tumi Sundori Koto"	Anupam Dutta	Anupam Dutta	Pulak Banerjee	solo
1995	Sesh Pratiksha	"Ami Janmo Janmo"	Kumar Sanu	Anupam Dutta	Pulak Banerjee	
1996	Aparajita	"Aaj Noy Kono"(Female)	Ajoy Das			
1996	Aparajita	"Gaan Nor E Amar"	Ajoy Das			
1996	Aparajita	"Uru Uru Uru Ei"	Ajoy Das			
1996	Bachar Lorai	"Oi Sontrasi Meye"	Alauddin Ali	Mohammad Rafiquzzaman	Babul Supriyo, Poornima	
1996	Bachar Lorai	"Tumi Dakle Pore"	Alauddin Ali	Mohammad Rafiquzzaman	Udit Narayan	
1996	Biyer Phool	"Jotoi Koro Bahana"	Jatin-Lalit	Pulak Banerjee	Kumar Sanu	
1996	Biyer Phool	"Aaj Didir Biye"	Jatin-Lalit	Pulak Banerjee	solo	
1996	Biyer Phool	"Ei Jiboner Ei Khela"	Jatin-Lalit	Pulak Banerjee	solo	
1996	Biyer Phool	"Chham Chham Nupur Baje"	Jatin-Lalit	Pulak Banerjee	Vijayta Pandit	
1996	Beadap	"Uthti Boyos Meye Ami"	Jagmohan	N/A	solo	
1996	Beadap	"Mayer Ruper Nei Tulona"	Jagmohan	N/A	solo	
1996	Jamaibabu	"Amra Premi Premer Dol"	Bappi Lahiri		Mohammad Aziz, Kumar Sanu	
1996	Lathi	"Amar Misti Ekta"	Bappi Lahiri		solo	
1996	Lathi	"Tomra Amar Swargo"	Bappi Lahiri			
1996	Mahan	"Chotta Belar Sei Sob"	Mrinal Benerjee		Kumar Sanu	
1996	Miss Maitreyi	"Tui Je Amar Chokher Alo"	Saikat Mitra	Pulak Banerjee, Laxmikant Roy	Kumar Sanu	
1996	Miss Maitreyi	"Chiki Chiki Chuku Chuku"	Saikat Mitra	Pulak Banerjee, Laxmikant Roy	Surjo Adhikari	
1996	Miss Maitreyi	"Sunday Theke Thursday"	Saikat Mitra	Pulak Banerjee, Laxmikant Roy	Surjo Adhikari	
1996	Miss Maitreyi	"Bishwojononi Trinoyoni"	Saikat Mitra	Pulak Banerjee, Laxmikant Roy	solo	
1996	Mukhyamantri	"Krishnagarer Thake Krishna"	Mrinal Banerjee			
1997	Ajker Sontan	"Bhalobashar Naam Holo" (part 1)	Bappi Lahiri	Mukul Dutta	Abhijeet Bhattacharya	
1997	Ajker Sontan	"Bhalobashar Naam Holo" (part 2)	Bappi Lahiri	Mukul Dutta	Abhijeet Bhattacharya	
1997	Ajker Sontan	"Bhalobashar Naam Holo" (part 3)	Bappi Lahiri	Mukul Dutta	Abhijeet Bhattacharya	
1997	Bhalobasha	"Joy Joy Krishna Kanhai"	Anupam Dutta	Pulak Banerjee	solo	
1997	Jibon Juddho	"Janma Amar Kalo"	Nadeem–Shravan		Ila Arun	
1997	Jibon Juddho	"Chor Chor Maan"	Nadeem–Shravan		Nachiketa Chakraborty	
1997	Jibon Juddho	"Lajja Keno Elo"	Nadeem–Shravan		solo	
1997	Jibon Joubon	Moner Bashay Ajke Abar"	Sapan-Jagmohan		solo	
1997	Jibon Joubon	"Kono Andha Galir"	Sapan-Jagmohan		Kumar Sanu	
1997	Nishpap Asami	"Tomar Amar Mon"	Ashok Bhadra		Kumar Sanu	
1997	Pabitra Papi	"Joler Pakhi Pankouri"	Ashok Bhadra		solo	
1997	Swami Keno Ashami	"Manush To Khelna Noy"	Bappi Lahiri		Mohammad Aziz	
1997	Swami Keno Ashami	"O Shapini Nach Re"	Bappi Lahiri		Abhijeet Bhattacharya	
1997	Tomake Chai	"O Sathi Re" (duet)	Ashok Bhadra	Pulak Banerjee	Babul Supriyo	
1997	Tomake Chai	"O Sathi Re" (sad)	Ashok Bhadra	Pulak Banerjee	solo	
1998	Aamar Maa	"Ami Manush Khun Korte Pari"			Abhijeet Bhattacharya	
1998	Aamar Maa	"Bhaiye Bhaiye Bhai Hoy"			Abhijeet Bhattacharya	
1998	Aami Sei Meye	"Aguner Din Shesh Hobe Ekdin"	Tabun Sutradhar	N/A	Kumar Sanu	
1998	Hothat Brishti	"Ruk Jaa"	Nachiketa Chakraborty	N/A	solo	
1998	Lola Lucy	"Mammi Bole"			Udit Narayan	
1998	Lola Lucy	"Yamma Ho"			Udit Narayan	
1998	Meyerao Manush	Kokhono Sagor Chhilo"	Bappi Lahiri	Gazi Mazharul Anwar	Kumar Sanu	
1998	Praner Cheye Priyo	"Tomar Kachhe"	Anupam Dutta		Abhijeet Bhattacharya	
1998	Praner Cheye Priyo	"Aamader Swapna"	Anupam Dutta		Abhijeet Bhattacharya	
1998	Putra Badhu	"Ami Chirodin Tomakei"	Anupam Dutta		Kumar Sanu	
1998	Putra Badhu	"Tomar Preme Pagol"	Anupam Dutta		Kumar Sanu	
1998	Raja Rani Badshah	"Mago Amar Ma"	Babul Bose		Udit Narayan	
1998	Raja Rani Badshah	"Dhaka Theke"	Babul Bose		Udit Narayan	
1998	Seito Abar Kachhe Ele	"Desh Bideshe Jekhane Jaai"	Bappi Lahiri		solo	
1998	Shopner Raja	"Bhul Sobi Bhul"	Bappi Lahiri	N/A	solo	
1999	Amar Bodhua	"Amar Nisshase Tumi"	Bappi Lahiri		solo	
1999	Amar Bodhua	"Kopale Chondon"	Bappi Lahiri		Abhijeet Bhattacharya	
1999	Bidhatar Khela	"Hridoy Tomar"	Tabun Sutradhar	Priyo Chatterjee	Babul Supriyo, chorus	
1999	Chena Achena	"Jake Ei Mon Chay"	Anupam Dutta	Pulak Banerjee	solo	
1999	Day Dayitto	"Janala Diye Jyotsna"			solo	
1999	Rajdondo	"Buker Majhe Agun"			solo	
1999	Sindoor Khela	"Chaina Amar"	Uttam Singh	Pulak Banerjee	Babul Supriyo	
1999	Swamir Ghor	"Mone Koro Na"	Anupam Dutta	Pulak Banerjee	solo	
1999	Swapna Nilea	"Amar Chokher"	Ajay Chakraborty			
2000	Amader Sansar	"Shominare Morle Pore"			solo	
2000	Dhormo Adharmo	"Ghum Bhora Chokhe"	Samir Chakraborty	Pulak Banerjee	Kumar Sanu	
2000	Ei Mon Chay Je	"Albela Sajan" (re-used)	Ismail Darbar	Mehboob Kotwal	Sultan Khan	
2000	Haar Jeet	"Tomar Chokher Dike"	Abhijeet Bhattacharya	N/A	Abhijeet Bhattacharya	
2000	Haar Jeet	"Neshay Doba Golap Ami"	Abhijeet Bhattacharya	N/A	solo	
2000	Sajoni Aamar Sohag	"Sundor Koto Sundor"	Anupam Dutta		Monali Thakur, Gautam Ghosh, Pratik Chowdhury	
2000	Sajoni Aamar Sohag	"Sundor Koto Sundor"	Anupam Dutta		solo	
2000	Shesh Thikana	"Keu Nei Kachakachi"	Rijib Chakraborty			
2001	Bangshadhar	"Jagabo Ei Raat"	N/A	N/A	Abhijeet Bhattacharya, Sonu Nigam	
2001	Bidhatar Khela	"Hridoy Tumar"	Tabun		Babul Supriyo	
2001	Dada Thakur	"Love Love Mane Pyaar"	Babul Bose	Gautam Sushmit	Udit Narayan	
2002	"Bor Kone"	"Ki Naame Dakbo Tomake"	Ashish Kumar	N/A	Babul Supriyo	
2002	Janam Janamer Sathi	"Ele Na Tumi Je"	Anand–Milind		Abhijeet Bhattacharya	
2002	Janam Janamer Sathi	"Bhalobeshe Aami Je"	Anand–Milind		solo	
2002	Jibon Judh	"Save Koli Phool"	Babul Bose		solo	
2002	Jibon Judh	"Na Na Na Omon"	Babul Bose		Babul Supriyo	
2002	Kurukshetra	"Kokila Kuhu Sure"	Ashok Bhadra		solo	
2002	Moner Majhe Tumi	"Akashe Batashe"	Devendranath Chatterjee	Priyo Chatterjee	Sadhana Sargam	
2002	Moner Majhe Tumi	"Chupi Chupi Kichu Kotha"	Devendranath Chatterjee	Priyo Chatterjee	solo	
2002	Pratihinsa	"Sapno Amar"	Tabun Sutradhar		Shaan	
2002	Prem Shakti	"Babar Charan Tale"	Tabun Sutradhar	Tabun Sutradhar	Rana	
2002	Prem Shakti	"Sunechhi Bhagwan"	Tabun Sutradhar	Tabun Sutradhar	Soham Chakraborty	
2002	Protarok	"Shubho Kamona Roilo"	Ashim Chatterjee	Gautam Sushmit	solo	
2002	Protarok	"Jemon Nachai Temon Nachi"	Ashim Chatterjee	Gautam Sushmit	solo	
2002	Sapath Nilam	"Goon Goon"	Ajoy Das		solo	
2002	Se Aamar Prem	"Aare Na Na Na"	Bappi Lahiri		solo	
2002	Tak Jhal Mishti	"Kotha Hoyechilo"	Tabun			
2002	Tak Jhal Mishti	"Kato Na Mojar"	Tabun			
2002	Tak Misti Jiban	"Ae To Bestop Misti"	Babul Bose		Babul Supriyo	
2002	Tak Misti Jiban	"Nira La La Mayadini"	Babul Bose			
2003	Adorini	"Ami Jeek Pakhai"			Kumar Sanu	
2003	Adorini	"Sakkhai Kajol Keno Diti"				
2003	Biswasghatok	"Surjer Alo Take"	Ajoy Das	Shyamal Sengupta, Ranjit Dey	solo	
2003	Champion	"Mone Pore Koto Kotha"	S. P. Venkatesh	Gautam Sushmit	solo	
2003	Champion	"Cholona Prem Kori"	S. P. Venkatesh	Gautam Sushmit	Mano	
2003	Champion	"Chokhe Laage Nesha"	S. P. Venkatesh	Gautam Sushmit	Babul Supriyo	
2003	Champion	"Bondhu Bole Dako Jare" (duet)	S. P. Venkatesh	Gautam Sushmit	Babul Supriyo	
2003	Champion	"Bondhu Bole Dako Jare" (female)	S. P. Venkatesh	Gautam Sushmit	solo	
2003	Nosimon	"Amar Kemon Kemon Lage"	Devendranath Chatterjee	Ali Azad	solo	
2003	Qayamat: City Under Threat (Dubbed version)	"Janina Prem Kina"	Nadeem–Shravan	Lipi	Abhijeet Bhattacharya	
2003	Sangee	"Hok Na Se Abhinoy"	S. P. Venkatesh	Gautam Sushmit	solo	
2003	Shopner Purush	"Jalaiye Gela Moner Agun"	Milton Khondokar	Milton Khondokar	Babul Supriyo	
2003	Shopner Purush	"Kothay Pabo Sei"	Milton Khondokar	Milton Khondokar	solo	
2003	Sukh Dukher Sansar	"Ar Katodin Pare"	Anupam Dutta		solo	
2004	Agun Amar Naam	"Deewana Re Deewana, Ami Prem Deewana"	Emon Saha	Kabir Bakul	Asif Akbar	
2004	Akritoggo	"Ek Poloke Sei Ektu Dekhay"			Shampa Kundu, Udit Narayan	
2004	Akritoggo	"Ore Toder Buke Niye"			Babul Supriyo, Sanjeevani, Tanzir Tuhin	
2004	Aakrosh	"E Kalo Kalo Chokhe"			Shaan	
2004	Aakrosh	"Tumi Ami Pothohara"			solo	
2004	Prem Korechi Besh Korechi	"Amra Dujon Ruposhi"	Alauddin Ali	Gautam Sushmit, Kabir Bakul	Priya Bhattacharya	
2004	Sindurer Bandhan	"Bhulbona Seto Aar"	Ajoy Das		solo	
2005	Agnipath	"Kajol Kalo Kalo Chokhe"	Indrajit		Babul Supriyo	
2005	Agnipath	"Amader Songsar Sukhete Bhora"	Indrajit		Kumar Sanu	
2005	Mohabbat Jindabad	"N/A"	Devendranath Chatterjee		solo	
2005	Rajmohol	"Amar Chokhe Agun"	Ashok Bhadra	Gautam Sushmit	Kumar Sanu	
2005	Rajmohol	"Ke Achho Jege"	Ashok Bhadra	Gautam Sushmit	solo	
2006	Mayer Morjada	"Tomar Laiga Morte Paru"	Emon Saha	Gazi Mazharul Anwar	solo	
2008	Aainate	"Roj Shoto Shoto Mukh"	Joydeb Sen	N/A	solo	
2008	Biyer Lagna	"Prem Sotti"	Debendranath Chatterjee	Munshi Wadud	solo	
2008	Jor	"Akasher Neel"(Female)	S. P. Venkatesh		solo	
2008	Jor	"Akasher Neel"(Duet)	S. P. Venkatesh		Mano	
2008	Jor	"Jonom Jonom"(Duet)	S. P. Venkatesh		VV Prasanna	
2008	Jor	"Golaper Moto"	S. P. Venkatesh		Mano	
2009	Aparadhi	"Premier Ghari"	Bappi Lahiri		Shaan	
2010	Amar Bhai Amar Bon	"E Je Amar Swargo"	Devendranath Chatterjee	Munshi Wadud	Abhijeet Bhattacharya	
2010	Besh Korechi Prem Korechi	"Tumi Kothay Acho"	Kumar Sanu	Gautam Sushmit	Kumar Sanu	
2010	Mayer Ador	"Amar Mayer Moto"	Nabin Chatterjee		solo	
2011	Chupi Chupi	"Bikeler Shesh Alo"	Emon Saha, Madhu Mukherjee		Kumar Sanu	
2013	The Light Swami Vivekananda	"Kaise Kahu Mann Ki Batiya"			solo	
2013	The Light Swami Vivekananda	"Prabhuji More Aangan"			solo	
2014	Amardeep	"Kane Kane Kotha Nai"			Amit Kumar	
2014	Amardeep	"Kane Kane Kotha Nai"			solo	
2014	Bandhu Amar	"Bandhu Amar Mon Moyna"	Raj Guniyat		Kumar Sanu	
2014	College Campus	"Sagor Jemon Kore"	Ashish Kumar, Pinak		Kumar Sanu	
2017	Cockpit	"Ami Kolkatar Rosogolla"	Bappi Lahiri	Pulak Banerjee	Stylebhai	

=== Non-film songs ===
Year	Album	Song	Composer(s)	Co-artist(s)
2000	Single	"Jono Gono Mono"	Rabindranath Tagore	Lata Mangeshkar, Asha Bhosle, P. Unnikrishnan, Hariharan, S. P. Balasubrahmanyam, Kaushiki Chakraborty, Bhimsen Joshi
N/A	Milon	"Tumi Kachhe Ele"	Monwar Hossain Tutul	Asif Akbar
N/A	Milon	"Bhalobasha Hoy Jeno"	Monwar Hossain Tutul	Asif Akbar
N/A	Milon	"Keno Prem Hariye"	Monwar Hossain Tutul	Asif Akbar
N/A	Milon	"Nijhum Rate"	Monwar Hossain Tutul	Asif Akbar
N/A	Milon	"Protiti Nisshase"	Monwar Hossain Tutul	Asif Akbar
N/A	Milon	"Tumi Nei Katena Somoy"	Monwar Hossain Tutul	Asif Akbar
N/A	Milon	"Ore Sujon Naiya"	Monwar Hossain Tutul	solo
N/A	Milon	"Ajker Sondhyay"	Monwar Hossain Tutul	solo
N/A	Milon	"Emon Raate Ei Dujona"	Monwar Hossain Tutul	solo

== Marathi songs ==
This is a list of known Marathi songs performed by Kavita Krishnamurthy. She had also sung in several other different languages which are not included here.

Year	Film	Song	Composer(s)	Co-artist(s)
1984	Ranat Ranat	"Ranat Ranat Jambhul Vanat"	Abhijit Limaye	Solo
1984	Navri Mile Navryala	"Sajni Mohini"	Arun Paudwal	Anuradha Paudwal, Rani Varma, Shailendra Singh
1987	Prem Karuya Khullam Khulla	"Love Mhanje"	Ashok Patki	Vinay Mandke
1989	Kuthe Kuthe Shodhu Mi Tila	"Kanha Kanha"	Anil Mohile	Suresh Wadkar, Uttara Kelkar
1989	Bhutacha Bhau	"Tu Rangana Gori"	Arun Paudwal	Suresh Wadkar
1989	Anuraag	"Mi Pailtira Varuni"	Vijay Joshi	Solo
1989	Anuraag	"Hey Kaise Aghatit"	Vijay Joshi	Solo
1989	Balache Baap Brahmachari	"Priticha Game Asa Nava"	Sharang Dev	Suresh Wadkar, Vinay Mandke
1990	Dhamaal Bablya Ganpyachi	"Gujarat Nu Dandiya"	Ashok Patki	Suresh Wadkar, Vinay Mandke, Uttara Kelkar
1990	Dhamaal Bablya Ganpyachi	"Tad Tad Tasha Bole"	Ashok Patki	Suresh Wadkar, Vinay Mandke, Uttara Kelkar
1990	Dhamaal Bablya Ganpyachi	"Bagh Bagh Kartoy"	Ashok Patki	Vinay Mandke
1990	Baap Re Baap	"Manat Re Hurhurtay"	Ashok Patki	Vinay Mandke
1990	Baap Re Baap	"Sajle Swar Hey"	Ashok Patki	Prashant Damle
1991	Yeda Ki Khula	"Duniya Nachel Re"	Prabhakar Jog	Anuradha Paudwal
1991	Ek Gadi Baki Anadi	"Prathamesh Parmesha"	Ashok Patki	Suresh Wadkar
1991	Ek Gadi Baki Anadi	"Tillana Tillana"	Ashok Patki	Vinay Mandke, Dilraj Kaur
1991	Shubh Mangal Savdhan	"Pivlya Dhammak Rangachi"	Ashok Patki	Anupama Deshpande
1992	Anuradha	"Swapnatlya Fulanchi"	Anil Mohile	Suresh Wadkar
1992	Anuradha	"Daatla Chahu Kade Andhaar"	Anil Mohile	Solo
1993	Vajva Re Vajva	"Vajva Re Vajva Title Track"	Ashok Patki	Arun Ingle, Jolly Mukherjee
1993	Ghayaal	"Prem Majhe Tujhyavar Ahe"	Anand Modak	Suresh Wadkar
1993	Ghayaal	"Saare Nakalat Ghade"	Anand Modak	Ravindra Sathe
1993	Ha Chandra Jaaglela	"Ali Kade Ase"	Shank Neel	Solo
1993	Ha Chandra Jaaglela	"Sarit Sonchafa"	Shank Neel	Suresh Wadkar
1993	Ha Chandra Jaaglela	"Phoolanchi Papani Oli"	Shank Neel	Suresh Wadkar
1993	Ha Chandra Jaaglela	"Sosvena Hi Udasi"	Shank Neel	Suresh Wadkar
1993	Shivrayachi Soon Tara Rani	"Mi Ladi Godi Thodi Laavte"	Datta Davjekar	Solo
1993	Ugavale Narayan	"Ugavale Narayan"	Prabhakar Pandit	Solo
1993	Ugavale Narayan	"Madhava Devakichya Gopala"	Prabhakar Pandit	Solo
1993	Ugavale Narayan	"Jage Vhaa Shrihari"	Prabhakar Pandit	Solo
1993	Ugavale Narayan	"Uth Ladakya Uth Mukunda"	Prabhakar Pandit	Solo
1993	Garam Masala	"Ek Mi Ann Ek Tu"	Ashok Patki	Suresh Wadkar
1993	Garam Masala	"Zindagi Re Jagnyasathi"	Ashok Patki	Solo
1993	Damini Serial	"Damini Title Track"	Ashok Patki	Solo
1994	Rang Oletya Phoolancha	"Preet Tujhi Majhi"	Prabhakar Pandit	Suresh Wadkar
1994	Rang Oletya Phoolancha	"Rang Oletya Phoolancha"	Prabhakar Pandit	Solo
1994	Divya Divya Deepatkar	"All Strotams"	Shank Neel	Suresh Wadkar
1994	Chala Chala Lagnala	"Gore Gore Haath Tyala Mehendichi Saath"	Shank Neel	Solo
1994	Chala Chala Lagnala	"Vihinbai Lek Hi"	Shank Neel	Solo
1995	Hirwa Chuda Suwasinicha	"Bole Kokilla"	Nandu Honaap	Solo
1995	Mi Marathi	"Mogara Phulala"	Ashok Patki	Solo
1995	Paijan	"Jhali Raat Ga, Jhali Baat Ga"	Ram Kadam	Solo
1996	Soor Varyatala	"Ala Susat Ha Vara"	Hemant Avalaskar	Solo
1996	Soor Varyatala	"Bharleli Ratra Sari"	Hemant Avalaskar	Solo
1997	Sarkarnama	"Alwaar Tujhi Chahul"	Anand Modak	Solo
1998	Gaarva	"Kadhi Sanjveli"	Milind ingle	Solo
1998	Soor Nakshatra	"Ti Gard Daat Raane"	Hemant Avalaskar	Solo
1998	Soor Nakshatra	"Vadal Vara Tapor Gara"	Hemant Avalaskar	Solo
1999	Bindhaast	"Bindhast Ghe Shwas"	Ashok Patki	Hema Sardesai
1999	Navra Mumbaicha	"Omkarachya Gaabharyatun"	Nandu Honap	Solo
1999	Navra Mumbaicha	"Gora Gora Roop Tapora"	Nandu Honap	Solo
1999	Sawai Hawaldar	"Jhep Ghetli Akashi"	Shrikant Thakare	Solo
1999	Sawai Hawaldar	"Sonulya Ye Javite Tula"	Shrikant Thakare	Solo
2003	Polisachi Bayko	"Kuthe Jayache Tey Umajena"	Baal Naik	Solo
2003	Asha Pahate	"Vara Girki Gheto"	Hemant Avalaskar	Solo
2003	Asha Pahate	"Sutlay Vaadal Udtoy Padar"	Hemant Avalaskar	Solo
2011	Antar	"Taal Taal"	Ashok Patki	Shankar Mahadevan
2011	Arjun	"Arjuna Arjuna"	Lalit Sen	Solo
2013	Phoolat Rang Darvalala	"Phoolat Rang Darvalala"	Nandu Honap	Solo
2013	Phoolat Rang Darvalala	"Saaz Gheuni Aali"	Nandu Honap	Solo
2013	Phoolat Rang Darvalala	"Sajhun Laavile"	Nandu Honap	Solo
2013	Phoolat Rang Darvalala	"Kay Bolu Re Sakhya"	Nandu Honap	Solo
2014	Postcard	"Bebas Mere"	Gandhaar	Solo
2014	Raakhandaar	"Chandrama"	Kanak Raj	Swapnil Bandodkar
2014	Aashiyana	"Gunta Sutena"	Prabhakar Narwade	Solo

== Maithili songs ==
Year	Movie	Song title	Music director	Lyrics	Co-singers
2014	Half Murder	"Kiye Hansi"	Sunil Pawan		Udit Narayan
2014	Half Murder	"Appan Sajna Par"	Sunil Pawan		Sunil Pawan

== Nepali songs ==
Year	Movie	Song title	Music director	Lyrics	Co-singers
2010	Hatya	"Yo Dilma"	Shakti Ballav Shreshtha		Kumar Sanu
2010	Hatya	"Hridaye Le Chhoi Rahu"	Shakti Ballav Shreshtha		Kumar Sanu
2010	Hatya	"Indramaya Ko"	Shakti Ballav Shreshtha		Kumar Sanu

== Odia songs ==
Year	Movie	Song title	Music director	Lyrics	Co-singers
1992	Kapala Likhana	"Sathi Mo Jivana Sathi"	Akshaya Mohanty		Sudesh Bhosle
1992	Kapala Likhana	"Jodi Re Jodi"	Akshaya Mohanty		Akshay Mohanty
1992	Kapala Likhana	"Geeta I Love You"	Akshaya Mohanty		Kumar Sanu
1992	Kapala Likhana	"Aaji Khusire Hebi Mun Pagala"	Akshaya Mohanty		Suresh Wadkar, Sudesh Bhosle, Sadhana Sargam
1992	Maa	"Ajata Helle Aba Rusire"	R D Burman		solo
1994	Gopare Badhuchi Kala Kanhei	"Koili Kaha Maina Kaha"	Bachu Mukherjee		solo
1994	Gopare Badhuchi Kala Kanhei	"Rumjhum Jhumjhum"	Bachu Mukherjee		Mohammad Aziz, Shweta
1997	Laxman Rekha	"Tua Tua Tua Re"	Akshaya Mohanty		solo
1997	Laxman Rekha	"Tu Pain Nahin Kahara Sneha"	Akshaya Mohanty		solo
1997	Laxman Rekha	"Kichi Kichi Hauchi"	Akshaya Mohanty		Sonu Nigam
1997	Kandheyi Aakhire Luha	"Maa Kali Mahakali"	Amarendra Mohanty		solo

== Bhojpuri songs ==
Year	Movie	Song title	Music director	Lyrics	Co-singers
1987	Dharti Ki Aawaz	Shaadi Shaadi Ratte Ratte Main To Dubli Ho	Onkar	Sameer	Shabbir Kumar
2006	Pyaar Mein Tohar Ude Chunaria	"Ab Ke Baras"			Kumar Sanu

=== Non-film songs ===
Year	Album	Song title	Music director	Co-singers
1988	Kajri	"Vidhna Ke Anguri Par Naache"	Sapan-Jagmohan	solo
1988	Kajri	"He Shivshankar"	Sapan-Jagmohan	solo
1988	Kajri	"Phoolmati Rani Tohe"	Sapan-Jagmohan	Jaspal Singh

== See also ==
- Kavita Krishnamurthy
- List of Songs recorded by Kavita Krishnamurthy in South-Indian languages
