= Rekha filmography =

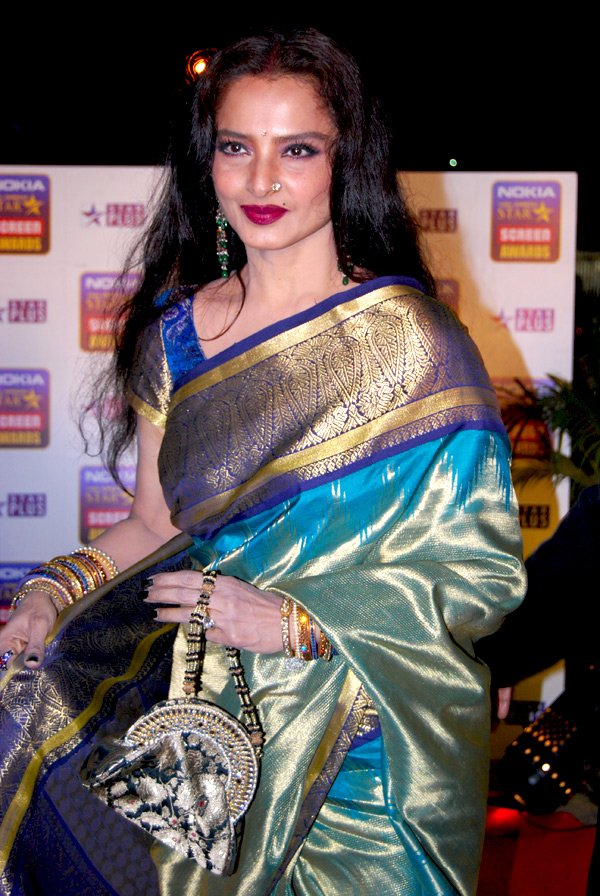
Rekha at the Screen Awards, 2008

Rekha is an Indian actress who has had a prolific career in Hindi films, and is acknowledged as one of the finest actresses of Indian cinema. She first appeared as a child artist in two Telugu-language films Inti Guttu (1958) and Rangula Ratnam (1966), but her career as a lead started with the Kannada film Operation Jackpot Nalli C.I.D 999 in 1969. In that same year, she starred in her first Hindi film, Anjana Safar, which was delayed for ten years due to censorship problems. (Note: The film released in 1979 under a different title, Do Shikaari.) Her first Hindi release was Sawan Bhadon (1970), a commercial success which established her as a rising star. She followed with roles in Raampur Ka Lakshman (1972), Kahani Kismat Ki (1973), and Pran Jaye Par Vachan Na Jaye (1974), to mainstream success but little recognition for her acting, and press criticism of her looks and overweight. Rekha was motivated to improve her acting and appearance and managed a well-publicised transformation, both physically and in terms of her screen persona and command of the Hindi language. Her work in the 1976 drama Do Anjaane was better received, and critical recognition of her roles as a rape victim in Ghar and a courtesan in Muqaddar Ka Sikandar (1978) marked the beginning of the most successful period of her career.

Through most of the 1980s and early 1990s, she was one of the leading actresses in Hindi cinema. Her comic role in Khubsoorat (1980) earned her a first Filmfare Award for Best Actress. Further mainstream success came with roles in a myriad of family and drama films such as Baseraa (1981), Silsila (1981), Ek Hi Bhool (1981), Jeevan Dhaara (1982), and Agar Tum Na Hote (1983). During this period, she extended her work into arthouse films, a movement of neo-realist films known in India as parallel cinema, often to favourable reviews. These films included Kalyug (1981), Umrao Jaan (1981), Vijeta (1982), Utsav (1984), and Ijaazat (1987). Her acclaimed portrayal of the eponymous classical courtesan in Umrao Jaan won her the National Film Award for Best Actress. Her work during the decade included sporadic dubbing and playback singing. Having credited her physical change to diet and yoga practice, she released an exercise audio, Rekha's Mind and Body Temple (1983). A period of decline during the middle of the decade was followed by Khoon Bhari Maang, among the first of a new trend of women-centred revenge films, which starred Rekha in the role of a woman avenging her attempted murder by her husband, and earned her a second Best Actress Filmfare Award.

Her work was much less frequent in subsequent decades. Most of her films in early 1990s mostly met with lukewarm reviews and were rejected by the audience. She was cast in several parts similar to that in Khoon Bhari Maang, the great majority of which failed to leave a similar mark, except for considerable success with Phool Bane Angaray (1991). In 1996, she won a third Filmfare Award, in the Best Supporting Actress category, for her negative turn of an underworld don in the action thriller Khiladiyon Ka Khiladi (1996), one of the year's highest-earning Hindi films. She accepted parts in two controversial films: a Kama Sutra instructor in Kama Sutra: A Tale of Love (1996) and a housewife moonlighting as a prostitute in Aastha: In the Prison of Spring (1997), to critical acclaim but some public scrutiny. In the 2000s, she was praised for her supporting roles in the 2001 dramas Zubeidaa and Lajja, and started playing mother roles, among which was her role in the science fiction Koi... Mil Gaya (2003) and its superhero sequel Krrish (2006). While her leading roles in the comedies Bachke Rehna Re Baba (2005) and Kudiyon Ka Hai Zamana (2006) were met with disapproval by critics, her supporting part in Yatra (2006) was better reviewed. This was followed by a long hiatus from film work, during which she appeared twice over the following decade in Sadiyaan (2010) and Super Nani (2014).

== Films ==
Year	Title	Role	Notes	Ref(s)
1958	Inti Guttu	—	Telugu film (child artist)	
1966	Rangula Ratnam	—	Telugu film (child artist)	
1969	Operation Jackpot Nalli C.I.D 999	Mona	Kannada film (debut in lead role)	
1970	Amma Kosam	Geetha	Telugu film	
1970	Sawan Bhadon	Chanda		
1971	Haseenon Ka Devata	Sunita / Chhabili		
1971	Elaan	Mala Mehta / Mary		
1971	Dost Aur Dushman	Rekha	Special appearance	
1971	Saaz Aur Sanam	Pushpa		
1972	Zameen Aasmaan	Kalpana		
1972	Sazaa	Courtesan	Special appearance	
1972	Gora Aur Kala	Phoolwa		
1972	Gaon Hamara Shaher Tumhara	Parvati (Paro)		
1972	Ek Bechara	Kavita		
1972	Do Yaar	Seema		
1972	Double Cross	Rekha		
1972	Raampur Ka Lakshman	Rekha Chaudhary		
1973	Mehmaan	Sheela		
1973	Khoon Khoon	Rekha		
1973	Keemat	Sudha		
1973	Kashmakash	Seeta		
1973	Kahani Kismat Ki	Rekha		
1973	Dharma	Asha/Radha	Double role	
1973	Barkha Bahar	Ganga		
1973	Anokhi Ada	Neeta Gupta		
1973	Namak Haraam	Shyama		
1974	Woh Main Nahin	Anjali		
1974	Pran Jaye Par Vachan Na Jaye	Janniya/Sheetal		
1974	Hawas	Herself	Cameo appearance	
1974	Duniya Ka Mela	Shyama		
1974	Do Aankhen			
1975	Zorro	Zorro		
1975	Kahte Hain Mujhko Raja	Rina		
1975	Dafaa 302	Rajkumari Rekhadevi		
1975	Dharmatma	Anu		
1975	Aakraman	Sheetal		
1975	Dharam Karam	Basanti		
1976	Suntan	Sarita		
1976	Khalifa	Rekha		
1976	Kabeela	Shobha		
1976	Do Anjaane	Rekha Roy/Sunita Devi		
1976	Aaj Ka Mahaatma	Mala		
1976	Nagin	Sunita		
1977	Saal Solvan Chadya	Wedding entertainer		
1977	Ram Bharose	Kiran		
1977	Kachcha Chor	Asha		
1977	Farishta Ya Qatil			
1977	Dildaar	Lata		
1977	Chakkar Pe Chakkar	Shila Sahini		
1977	Alaap	Radha Kumari (Radhiya)		
1977	Aap Ki Khatir	Sarita		
1977	Immaan Dharam	Durga		
1977	Khoon Pasina	Chanda		
1977	Palkon Ki Chhaon Mein	Herself	Guest appearance	
1978	Saawan Ke Geet	Radha		
1978	Ram Kasam	Radha		
1978	Rahu Ketu	Tulsi		
1978	Parmatma	Deepa		
1978	Muqaddar			
1978	Karmayogi	Rekha		
1978	Bhola Bhala	Champa		
1978	Aakhri Daku			
1978	Ganga Ki Saugandh	Dhaniya		
1978	Ghar	Aarti Chandra	Nominated–Filmfare Award for Best Actress	
1978	Kasme Vaade	Dancer	Special appearance	
1978	Do Musafir	Bijli		
1978	Muqaddar Ka Sikander	Zohrabai	Nominated—Filmfare Best Supporting Actress Award	
1979	Muqabla	Qawwali singer	Special appearance	
1979	Mr. Natwarlal	Shanno		
1979	Jaani Dushman	Champa		
1979	Prem Bandhan	Mahua		
1979	Kartavya	Nita		
1979	Suhaag	Basanti		
1979	Do Shikaari	Sunita	Delayed release	
1979	Ahinsa	Radha		
1979	Gol Maal	Herself	Cameo appearance	
1979	Naya Bakra	Qawwali singer	Special appearance	
1980	Ram Balram	Shobha		
1980	Maang Bharo Sajana	Radha		
1980	Khubsoorat	Manju Dayal	Winner, Filmfare Award for Best Actress	
1980	Judaai	Gauri	Nominated–Filmfare Award for Best Actress	
1980	Kali Ghata	Rekha/Rashmi	Double role	
1980	Jyoti Bane Jwala	Courtesan	Special appearance	
1980	Jal Mahal	Namita/Gayatri Devi/Rekha		
1980	Agreement	Mala Mathur		
1980	Neeyat	Rekha		
1980	Aanchal	Tulsi		
1981	Umrao Jaan	Amiran/Umrao Jaan	Winner, National Film Award for Best Actress	
1981	Saajan Ki Saheli	Moon-Moon Dhawan		
1981	Chehre Pe Chehra	Daisy		
1981	Kalyug	Supriya		
1981	Mangalsutra	Gayatri B. Prasad		
1981	Khoon Aur Paani	Champa		
1981	Daasi	Tara		
1981	Silsila	Chandni		
1981	Baseraa	Purnima Kohli (Nima)		
1981	Ghungroo Ki Awaaz	Kajal/Kiran Gomes/Rani		
1981	Ek Hi Bhool	Sadhana Srivastav		
1981	Chashme Buddoor	Herself	Cameo appearance	
1982	Vijeta	Neelima		
1982	Mehndi Rang Layegi	Kalpana		
1982	Ghazab	Jamuna		
1982	Jeevan Dhaara	Sangeeta Shrivastav	Nominated–Filmfare Award for Best Actress	
1982	Raaste Pyar Ke	Gauri		
1982	Apna Bana Lo	Roopadevi		
1982	Deedar-E-Yaar	Husna		
1983	Prem Tapasya	Bela		
1983	Nishaan	Rita		
1983	Film Hi Film	Herself	Cameo appearance	
1983	Mujhe Insaaf Chahiye	Shakuntala	Nominated–Filmfare Award for Best Supporting Actress	
1983	Agar Tum Na Hote	Purnima Mehra/Radha Bedi	Double role	
1984	Bindiya Chamkegi	Radha		
1984	Maati Maangey Khoon	Shyamlee (Courtesan)		
1984	Asha Jyoti	Asha		
1984	Baazi	Asha		
1984	Zameen Aasmaan	Kanchan gupta		
1984	Utsav	Vasantsena		
1984	Jhutha Sach	Alka		
1984	Paan Khaye Siyan Hamaar	Herself	Bhojpuri Film; Cameo appearance	
1985	Ram Tere Kitne Nam	Mrs. Radha Aloknath Gupta		
1985	Faasle	Maya		
1985	Jhoothi	Kalpana Srivastav		
1986	Sadaa Suhagan	Laxmi		
1986	Musafir	Saraswati Pillai		
1986	Insaaf Ki Awaaz	Inspector Jhansi Rani		
1986	Jaal	Amita S. Singh / Meenabai		
1986	Locket	Shalu		
1986	Janbaaz	Opera singer	Special appearance	
1987	Pyar Ki Jeet	Soni		
1987	Ijaazat	Sudha		
1987	Apne Apne	Sharda Kapoor		
1987	Sansar	Uma Sharma		
1987	Jaan Hatheli Pe	Geeta Verma		
1987	Khazana	Anita Mathur		
1988	Khoon Bhari Maang	Aarti Verma/Jyoti	Winner, Filmfare Award for Best Actress	
1988	Ek Naya Rishta	Aarti Saxena		
1988	Biwi Ho To Aisi	Shalu Mehra		
1988	Soorma Bhopali	Cameo		
1988	Akarshan	Cameo		
1989	Kasam Suhaag Ki	Surajmukhi/Shama		
1989	Clerk	Mrs. Sneh Kapoor		
1989	Souten Ki Beti	Radha S. Verma		
1989	Ladaai	Shakuntala Verma		
1989	Bhrashtachar	Bhavani		
1989	Bahurani	Madhuri/Malti Chaudhary		
1990	Sheshnaag	Champa		
1990	Mera Pati Sirf Mera Hai	Sharda Dayal Sharma		
1990	Azaad Desh Ke Gulam	Bharti Bhandari		
1990	Amiri Garibi	Sona		
1990	Aag Ka Darya		Unreleased film	
1991	Yeh Aag Kab Bujhegi	Professor Radha		
1991	Phool Bane Angaray	Namrata Singh	Nominated–Filmfare Award for Best Actress	
1992	Insaaf Ki Devi	Sadhana Verma		
1993	Geetanjali	Anjali Mehra/Geeta Bhardwaj		
1994	Madam X	Madam X/Sonu	Double role	
1995	Nishana	Bharti		
1995	Ab Insaf Hoga	Jankidevi Prasad		
1996	Aurat Aurat Aurat	Sita Vajpai	Delayed release	
1996	Khiladiyon Ka Khiladi	Maya	Winner, Filmfare Award for Best Supporting Actress	
1996	Kama Sutra: A Tale of Love	Rasa Devi (Teacher)		
1997	Aastha: In the Prison of Spring	Mansi		
1997	Udaan	Varsha Sahay		
1998	Qila	Yamini		
1999	Mother	Asha Britannia		
2000	Bulandi	Lakshmi		
2001	Zubeidaa	Maharani Mandira Devi		
2001	Censor	Ms. Shrivastav		
2001	Mujhe Meri Biwi Se Bachaao	Kamini Mathur		
2001	Lajja	Ramdulaari	Nominated–Filmfare Award for Best Supporting Actress	
2002	Dil Hai Tumhaara	Saritaji		
2003	Bhoot	Sarita		
2003	Koi... Mil Gaya	Sonia Mehra	Nominated–Filmfare Award for Best Supporting Actress	
2005	Bachke Rehna Re Baba	Rukmini/Richa/Gurpreet		
2005	Parineeta	Moulin Rouge singer in the song "Kaisi Paheli Zindagaani"	Special appearance	
2006	Kudiyon Ka Hai Zamana	Mayuri		
2006	Krrish	Sonia S. Mehra	Nominated–Filmfare Award for Best Supporting Actress	
2007	Yatra	Lajwanti		
2007	Om Shanti Om	Herself	Cameo appearance	
2010	Sadiyaan	Amrit		
2013	Krrish 3	Sonia Mehra		
2014	Super Nani	Bharti Bhatia		
2015	Shamitabh	Herself	Cameo appearance	
2018	Yamla Pagla Deewana: Phir Se	Special appearance in "Rafta Rafta Medley"	Cameo appearance	

== Television ==
Year	Title	Role	Notes	Ref(s)
2020,2021,2023	Ghum Hai Kisikey Pyaar Meiin	Herself	Promotion	

== Dubbing ==
Year	Title	Role	Actor	Notes	Ref(s)
1986	Aakhree Raasta	Vinita Bhatnagar	Sridevi		
1988	Waaris	Paramjeet "Paro"	Smita Patil		
1999	Sooryavansham	Sharda	Jayasudha		
1999	Sooryavansham	Radha	Soundarya		
2021	Bigg Boss 15	Vishwa Suntree	—N/a	Reality show	

== Playback singing ==
Year	Film	Song	Music director	Notes	Ref(s)
1980	Khubsoorat	"Qayda Qayda"	R. D. Burman		
1983	Agar Tum Na Hote	"Kal To Sunday Ki Chhuti"	R. D. Burman		
1983	Ek Naya Rishta	"Ehsaas Ka Sauda Hai"	Khayyam		

== Exercise audio ==
Year	Title	Notes	Ref(s)
1983	Rekha's Mind and Body Temple		

== See also ==
- List of awards and nominations received by Rekha

== Bibliography ==
- Bumiller, Elisabeth (1 June 1991). May You Be the Mother of a Hundred Sons. Penguin Books India. p. 185. ISBN 978-0-14-015671-3.
- Chaudhuri, Diptakirti (2014). Bollybook: The Big Book of Hindi Movie Trivia. Penguin UK. ISBN 978-93-5118-799-8.
- Ganti, Tejaswini (2004). Bollywood: A Guidebook to Popular Hindi Cinema. Routledge. ISBN 978-0-415-28853-8.
- Gulzar; Nihalani, Govind; Chatterjee, Saibal (2003). Encyclopaedia of Hindi Cinema. Encyclopaedia Britannica (India). ISBN 978-81-7991-066-5.
- Munshi, Shoma (2004). "A Perfect 10—"Modern and Indian": Representations of the Body in Beauty Pageants and the Visual Media in Contemporary". In Mills, James H.; Sen, Satadru (eds.). Confronting the Body: The Politics of Physicality in Colonial and Post-colonial India. London: Anthem Press. pp. 162–182. ISBN 978-1-84331-033-4.
- Rajadhyaksha, Ashish; Willemen, Paul (1999). Encyclopedia of Indian Cinema. Routledge. ISBN 978-1-135-94325-7.
- Usman, Yasser (29 August 2016). Rekha: The Untold Story. New Delhi, India: Juggernaut Books. ISBN 978-81-93284-18-6.
