= List of awards and nominations received by Rekha =

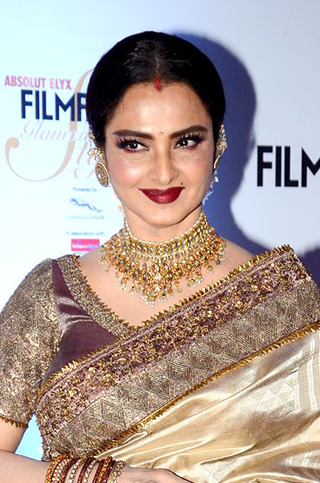
Rekha in 2016

Rekha is an Indian actress who has received several awards and nominations, including a National Film Award and four Filmfare Awards. Hailed as one of India's finest actresses, she made her debut as a child artist in 1966 and went on to appear in lead roles in the early 1970s. Since her debut as a leading actress she has acted in over 180 films. Rekha has often portrayed strong female characters, while also acting in some arthouse films besides numerous mainstream cinema. She has won four Filmfare Awards; two Best Actress awards—resulting from seven nominations, one Best Supporting Actress award—resulting from six nominations, and a Lifetime Achievement Award. The first Best Actress win came in 1981 for the Hrishikesh Mukherjee-directed Khubsoorat where she was cast in a comic role. Her portrayal of a classical courtesan in Umrao Jaan (1981) fetched her the National Film Award for Best Actress in 1982. Rekha received her second Filmfare Award for Best Actress in 1989 for Khoon Bhari Maang. She portrayed the role of a widow who sets out to take revenge on her lover. Her negative role in Khiladiyon Ka Khiladi was highly appreciated by critics and earned her the Filmfare Award for Best Supporting Actress. In 2003, she was presented with the Lifetime Achievement Award. In 2010, Rekha was awarded the Padma Shri, the 4th highest civilian honour in India. Other awards won by her include International Indian Film Academy Awards, Bengal Film Journalists' Association Awards, Star Screen Awards, Zee Cine Awards, Stardust Awards and Bollywood Movie Awards.

== National Film Awards ==
The National Film Awards is the most prominent film award ceremony in India. The Best Actress category was introduced in 1968 and has been presented annually to an actress who has delivered the best performance in a leading role within the Indian film industry.

Year	Film	Category	Result	Ref.
1982	Umrao Jaan	Best Actress	Won	

== Filmfare Awards ==
The Filmfare Awards are given by Filmfare annually for Hindi films. The Best Actress award is given to a female actor who has delivered an outstanding performance in a leading role. The award was first given in 1954.

Competitive awards

Year	Film	Category	Result	Ref.
1979	Muqaddar Ka Sikandar	Best Supporting Actress	Nominated	
1979	Ghar	Best Actress	Nominated	
1981	Judaai	Best Actress	Nominated	
1981	Khubsoorat	Best Actress	Won	
1982	Umrao Jaan	Best Actress	Nominated	
1983	Jeevan Dhaara	Best Actress	Nominated	
1984	Mujhe Insaaf Chahiye	Best Supporting Actress	Nominated	
1989	Khoon Bhari Maang	Best Actress	Won	
1992	Phool Bane Angaray	Best Actress	Nominated	
1997	Khiladiyon Ka Khiladi	Best Supporting Actress	Won	
2002	Lajja	Best Supporting Actress	Nominated	
2004	Koi... Mil Gaya	Best Supporting Actress	Nominated	
2007	Krrish	Best Supporting Actress	Nominated	

Honorary Award

Year	Category	Result	Ref.
2003	Lifetime Achievement Award	Won	

== International Indian Film Academy Awards ==
Year	Film	Category	Result	Ref.
2002	Lajja	Best Supporting Actress	Nominated	
2003	—N/a	Samsung Diva Award	Won	
2004	Koi... Mil Gaya	Best Supporting Actress	Nominated	
2007	Krrish	Best Supporting Actress	Nominated	
2012	—N/a	Outstanding Achievement in Indian Cinema	Won	

== Bengal Film Journalists' Association Awards ==
Year	Film	Category	Result	Ref.
1985	Utsav	Best Actress (Hindi)	Won	

== Screen Awards ==
Year	Film	Category	Result	Ref.
1997	Khiladiyon Ka Khiladi	Best Actor in a Negative Role	Won	
1998	Aastha: In the Prison of Spring	Best Actress	Nominated	
2002	Lajja	Best Supporting Actress	Nominated	

== Zee Cine Awards ==
Year	Film	Category	Result	Ref.
2002	Lajja	Best Supporting Actress	Nominated	
2004	Koi... Mil Gaya	Best Supporting Actress	Nominated	
2006	—N/a	Lifetime Achievement Award	Won	
2007	Krrish	Best Supporting Actress	Nominated	
2007	—N/a	Forever Diva Award	Won	

== Stardust Awards ==
Year	Category	Result	Ref.
2006	Role Model of the Year	Won	
2010	Editors' Choice Icon of the Industry	Won	
2012	Role Model of the Industry Award	Won	

== Bollywood Movie Awards ==
Year	Film	Category	Outcome
2002	Lajja	Best Supporting Actress	Nominated
2003	Dil Hai Tumhaara	Best Supporting Actress	Nominated
2004	Koi Mil Gaya	Best Supporting Actress	Won

== Other awards ==
- 1977: Film World Award for Best Actress, Immaan Dharam.
- 1997: Lakme Timeless Beauty Award
- 2004: Maha Style Icon of the year.
- 2005: Sony Golden Glory Award.
- 2006: Idea Zee F Awards - Fashionable Film Star.
- 2012: Big Star Eternal Youth Star Award
- 2018: Lux Golden Rose Awards - Lux Golden Rose Legendary Beauty Award

== Honours and recognitions ==
- 1998: Lachhu Maharaj Award for the Best Kathak Dancer in Hindi films.
- 2001: Mumbai Academy of the Moving Image, an award for her abiding contribution to Cinema.
- 2006: Deenanath Mangeshkar Award.
- 2007: Living Legend in the world of entertainment by FICCI.
- 2008: "IMPPA (Indian Motion Pictures' Producers Association) Award" for outstanding contribution to Bollywood.
- 2009: "Raj Kapoor Pratibha Gaurav Puraskar" by the Government of Maharashtra for outstanding contribution to the Indian cinema.
- 2010: She was awarded the Padma Shri, India's fourth highest civilian honour from the Government of India.
- 2019: ANR National Award for 2018
