= Rekha =

Indian actress (born 1954)

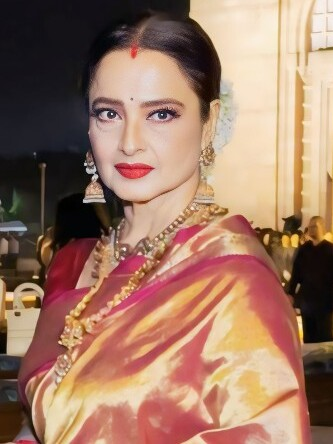
- Rekha in 2023
- Born: Bhanurekha Ganesan; 10 October 1954 (age 72); Madras, Madras State, India
- Education: Sacred Heart Convent, Chennai
- Occupation: Actress
- Years active: 1958–present
- Works: Full list
- Spouse: Mukesh Agarwal (m. 1990; died 1991)
- Parents: Gemini Ganesan (father); Pushpavalli (mother)
- Family: Ganesan family
- Awards: Full list
- Honours: Padma Shri (2010)

Member of Parliament, Rajya Sabha
- In office 27 April 2012 – 26 April 2018
- Constituency: Nominated

Bhanurekha Ganesan (pronounced [ˈbʱaːnuɾeːkʰa ɡaɳeːʃan]; born 10 October 1954), better known by her mononymous stage name Rekha, is an Indian actress who appears predominantly in Hindi films. Acknowledged as one of the finest actresses in Indian cinema, she has starred in more than 200 films and is the recipient of several accolades, including one National Film Award and three Filmfare Awards. She has often played strong and complicated female characters, from fictional to literary, in both mainstream and independent films. Though her career has gone through certain periods of decline, Rekha has gained a reputation for reinventing herself numerous times and has been credited for her ability to sustain her status. In 2010, the Government of India honoured her with Padma Shri, India's fourth highest civilian honour.

The daughter of actors Pushpavalli and Gemini Ganesan, Rekha started her career as a child actress in Telugu films Inti Guttu (1958) and Rangula Ratnam (1966). Her first film as a lead happened with the Kannada movie Operation Jackpot Nalli C.I.D 999 (1969). Her Hindi debut with Sawan Bhadon (1970) established her as a rising star, but despite the success of several of her early films, she was often panned in the press for her looks and weight. Motivated by criticism, she started working on her appearance and put effort into improving her acting technique and command of the Hindi language, resulting in a well-publicised transformation. Early recognition in 1978 for her performances in Ghar and Muqaddar Ka Sikandar marked the beginning of the most successful period of her career, and she was one of Hindi cinema's leading stars through most of the 1980s and early 1990s.

For her performance in the comedy Khubsoorat (1980), Rekha received her first Filmfare Award for Best Actress. She followed it with roles in Baseraa (1981), Ek Hi Bhool (1981), Jeevan Dhaara (1982) and Agar Tum Na Hote (1983). While mostly prolific in popular Hindi cinema, during this time she ventured into parallel cinema, a movement of neo-realist arthouse films. These films included dramas such as Kalyug (1981), Vijeta (1982) and Utsav (1984), and her portrayal of a classical courtesan in Umrao Jaan (1981) won her the National Film Award for Best Actress. After a short setback in the mid-1980s, she was among the actresses who led a new trend of women-centred revenge films, starting with Khoon Bhari Maang (1988), for which she won a second Best Actress award at Filmfare.

Rekha's work was much less prolific in subsequent decades. Her roles in early 1990s mostly met with lukewarm reviews. In 1996, she played against type in the role of an underworld don in the action thriller Khiladiyon Ka Khiladi (1996), for which she won a third Filmfare Award in the Best Supporting Actress category, and further appeared in Kama Sutra: A Tale of Love (1996) and Aastha: In the Prison of Spring (1997) to critical acclaim but some public scrutiny. During the 2000s, she was praised for her supporting roles in the 2001 dramas Zubeidaa and Lajja, and started playing mother roles, among which was her role in the science fiction Koi... Mil Gaya (2003) and its superhero sequel Krrish (2006), both commercial successes. The lattermost emerged as her highest-grossing release.

Apart from acting, Rekha served as a Member of Parliament for the Rajya Sabha from 2012 to 2018. Her private life and public image have been the subject of frequent media interest and discussion. Starting in the 1970s, her pairing opposite Amitabh Bachchan in a number of successful films was accompanied by enduring speculation about a love affair between the two, culminating in their starring film Silsila (1981), which was reflective of media projections. Her only marriage to the Delhi-based industrialist and television manufacturer Mukesh Agarwal in March 1990 ended seven months later when he died by suicide. Rekha's public image has often been tied to her perceived sex appeal. She is often reluctant to give interviews or discuss her life, which has resulted in her being labelled a recluse.

== Early life and work ==
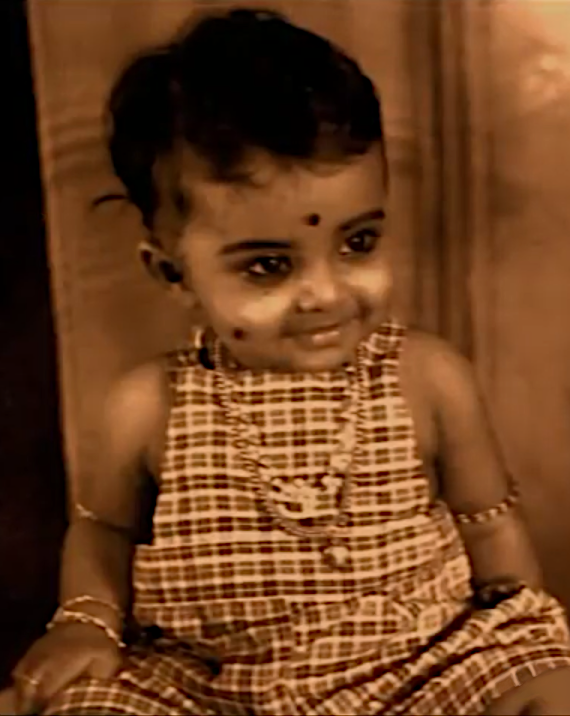
Rekha as a child, 1950s.

Rekha was born Bhanurekha Ganesan in Madras (present-day Chennai) on 10 October 1954 to South Indian actors Gemini Ganesan and Pushpavalli, when the couple were unmarried. Ganesan was already married to T. R. "Bobjima" Alamelu and had four children: the Illinois-based radiation oncologist Revathi Swaminathan, the gynecologist Kamala Selvaraj, The Times of India's journalist Narayani Ganesan, and the medical doctor Jaya Shreedhar. He had two more children with actress Savitri—Vijaya Chamundeswari, a fitness expert, and Sathish Kumaar. Meanwhile, Pushpavalli had two children (Babuji and Rama) from her earlier marriage to the lawyer I. V. Rangachari. Ganesan and Pushpavalli had another daughter, Radha (born 1955). Nagaprasad and the actress Shubha are her cousins, while Vedantam Raghavayya and his wife Suryaprabha are her uncle and aunt, respectively. Born to a Tamil father and a Telugu mother, Rekha is fluent in Tamil and Telugu. She has mentioned that "at home we used to talk in English" and that she thinks in English. She is also fluent in Hindi.

Rekha did not reveal her family background until mid-1970s. During her unstable childhood, her relationship with her father Ganesan was estranged. Ganesan did not want to recognize her as his daughter and give her a living. He rarely met both of his children with Pushpavalli, who subsequently married K. Prakash, a cinematographer from Madras, and she legally changed her name to K. Pushpavalli. She gave birth to two more children, Dhanalakshmi (who later married the actor Tej Sapru) and the dancer Seshu (died 21 May 1991). Due to her mother's hectic acting schedule at the time, Rekha would often stay with her grandmother. Asked in an interview by Simi Garewal about her father, Rekha believed he was never even aware of her existence. She recalled that her mother often spoke about him and added that despite never having lived with him, she felt his presence all through. Even so, the relationship started to improve five years after Pushpavalli died in 1991. He told a Cine Blitz interviewer of his happiness about this and stated, "Rekha and I have such a good rapport. We are really close." He died in 2005.

Rekha was one year old when she played a small role in the Telugu-language drama Inti Guttu. Directed by Vedantam Raghavayya, the film was released in late 1958 and became a commercial success. She was enrolled at a kindergarten when she was at the age of three and next joined the Sacred Heart Convent School, Church Park, Chennai, during her adolescence. She also met Narayani, Ganesan and Aramelu's second daughter, at the school when the latter was around nine or ten years old. Always an awkward and lonely girl, she admitted that she experienced childhood obesity. In a 1990 interview to The Illustrated Weekly of India, she called herself "the fattest girl in the school". In this period, she developed a love for dances and sports, although never participated in them due to her weight. Because of this, she was bullied by many of her schoolmates, who called her lotta (Tamil for "metal pot"). Rekha, describing herself as a "firm believer" in God and destiny, used to spend her time at the school's chapel. Another brief screen role came with the release of Rangula Ratnam (1966)—a political satire which was popular among the audience—co-starring with Pushpavalli and sister Radha.

According to her biographer Yasser Usman, Rekha was asked by Pushpavalli to start an acting career when their family faced financial troubles in 1968, as the latter was sure that it would help them. Although never interested in acting, Rekha (who initially aspired to be a flight attendant) obeyed her mother and, at the age of 13 or 14—while she was in ninth grade— dropped out from school to start a full-time career in acting; (Note: Tejaswini Ganti, in her book Bollywood: A Guidebook to Popular Hindi Cinema (2004), wrote that Rekha dropped out from her school when she was 13 years old. Talking to Bombay: The City Magazine in 1986, Rekha said that it happened while she was 14. However, she seemingly contradicted herself after she supported Ganti's statement in her 2004 televised interview with the actress and television presenter Simi Garewal.) she later regretted not having completed her education. Being a protective sister, she did not allow her younger sister Radha to join her line of work, because she wanted Radha to finish her education.

== Film career ==
=== Early roles (1968–1970) ===
"Bombay was like a jungle, and I had walked in unarmed. It was one of the most frightening phases of my life... I was totally ignorant of the ways of this new world. Guys did try and take advantage of my vulnerability... Every single day I cried, because I had to eat what I didn't like, wear crazy clothes with sequins and stuff poking into my body. Costume jewellery would give me an absolute terrible allergy. Hair spray wouldn't go off for days even despite all my washing. I was pushed, literally dragged from one studio to another. A terrible thing to do to a 13-year-old child."

— Rekha on her first visit to Bombay, 1990

In late 1968, the Nairobi-based businessman Kuljeet Pal visited Gemini Studios in search of a newcomer for his new project Anjana Safar (an adaption of H. Rider Haggard's 1885 novel King Solomon's Mines). He spotted Rekha at the studio and cast her as the film's second female lead after Vanisri. Pal went to Pushpavalli's house to give Rekha a screen test, dictating a number of sentences in Hindi, which were rewrote by Rekha in Latin script, and then told her to memorize it. A few moments later, Rekha recited the sentences completely and Pal was impressed of her native Hindi-speaker-like voice. He gave her a five-year contract to star in four films from him and his brother Shatrujeet Pal each.

Rekha moved to Bombay (present-day Mumbai) in 1969 and rented a room at the Hotel Ajanta in the city's neighbourhood Juhu, with Pal paying off the fee. Also that year, she announced her debut to public and the media, and the successful Kannada film Operation Jackpot Nalli C.I.D 999 with Dr. Rajkumar, where she features as a lead for the first time, was released. In Anjana Safar, directed by Raja Nawathe, she played Sunita, a woman forced by her father to travel to Africa in search of a hidden treasure. She was paid ₹25,000 (US$260) for her work.

Since her mother fell ill at the time, Rekha was accompanied by her aunt to the shooting, which started in August that year at Mehboob Studio. A controversy arose around a kissing scene featuring Rekha and male lead Biswajit Chatterjee, of which she was not notified as Nawathe wanted to maintain her natural reaction. In later years, Rekha complained at having been tricked into the scene. The film ran into censorship problems and would not be released until 1979, when it was retitled Do Shikaari. The kissing scene made it to the cover of the Asian edition of Life magazine in April 1970. This prompted the American journalist James Shephard to travel to India to interview Rekha, which she saw as an opportunity to boost her career and express her complaint. Do Shikaari underperformed at the box office.

Soon after her move to Bombay in 1969, Rekha was signed by the producer and director Mohan Sehgal for his film, Sawan Bhadon, and the filming started on 11 October. He cast her as Chanda, a village girl who does not receive approval from her parents to marry her lover (Navin Nischol). Although her hair was already long and thick, Sehgal forced her to wear a wig. Hence, it did not fit on her hair and her hairdressers had to shave her hair to almost bald. She was not fluent in Hindi at the time and most of the film's crew mocked her for having South Indian background. Marking her Hindi debut, Sawan Bhadon was released in September 1970 and became a commercial success. Film reviewers scorned her looks, but complimented her confidence and comic timing in the film. Manoj Das believed that "embarrassment" was shown on Nischol's face in every scenes with Rekha, and Film World magazine noted the film's success was a breakthrough for her career. Amma Kosam, a Telugu drama from the director Kolli Pratyagatma, was released in the end of the year, and she dedicated it to her mother.

=== Career fluctuations in the 1970s (1971–1977) ===
Rekha subsequently got several offers but nothing of substance, as her roles were mostly just of a glamour girl. She was highly prolific during the decade, working on average in ten films a year, most of which were deemed potboilers and failed to propel her career forward in terms of roles and appreciation. She appeared in several commercially successful films at the time, including Raampur Ka Lakshman (1972), Kahani Kismat Ki (1973), and Pran Jaye Par Vachan Na Jaye (1974), yet she was not regarded for her acting abilities and—according to the author Tejaswini Ganti—"the industry was surprised by her success as her dark complexion, plump figure, and garish clothing contradicted the norms of beauty prevalent in the film industry and in society." In 1975, she appeared in the war film Aakraman as Rakesh Roshan's wife Sheetal, a role Qurratulain Hyder thought was cliché and labelled "a clothes-horse". Randhir Kapoor's Dharam Karam is a drama about a hoodlum, and Link magazine noted that Rekha's part in it is the most pathetic of the entire cast. The mafia film Dharmatma was her only financial success of the year. Directed by and starring Feroz Khan, the film saw her in the part of Anu, Khan's childhood sweetheart. Additional films include Kabeela, about her appearance in which critic Gautam Kundu wrote that she "manages to be as undistinguished as the script will allow, which is plenty".

Rekha recalls that the way she was perceived at that time motivated her to change her appearance and improve her choice of roles: "I was called the [ugly duckling] of Hindi films because of my dark complexion and South Indian features. I used to feel deeply hurt when people compared me with the leading heroines of the time and said I was no match for them. I was determined to make it big on sheer merit." The mid-1970s marked the beginning of her physical transformation. She started paying attention to her make-up, dress sense, and worked to improve her acting technique and perfect her Hindi-language skills for three months. To lose weight, she followed a nutritious diet, led a regular, disciplined life, and practised yoga, later recording albums to promote physical fitness. According to Khalid Mohamed, "The audience was floored when there was a swift change in her screen personality, as well as her style of acting." Rekha began choosing her film roles with more care.

Rekha's first performance-oriented role came in 1976 when she played Amitabh Bachchan's ambitious and greedy wife in Do Anjaane; it would be her first of many appearances with the actor. (They appeared together in Namak Haraam (1973), but Rekha was paired opposite Rajesh Khanna). Her role is Rekha Roy, the wife of Bachchan's character who becomes an established actress. Shooting took place in Calcutta (present-day Kolkata) and was finished within a month; Rekha and the other cast and crew would stayed at the Grand Hotel. An adaptation of Nihar Ranjan Gupta's novel Ratrir Yatri, the film—directed by Dulal Guha and scripted by Nabendu Ghosh—was popular among the audience and critics. Film World wrote that she has proved herself as a leading actress in Hindi cinema as filmmakers had started taking more notice of her and become more keen to cast her in their films. She remarked that it was difficult to stand in front of Bachchan, speaking of how she felt paranoid after she knew that he would star opposite her in the film. She stated that he contributed to "dramatic changes" in her life and was a big influence in her adulthood, and described him "[someone] I'd never seen before".

1977 was the third year when Rekha was consecutively gained one commercial success; the action crime Khoon Pasina emerged as the sixth-highest-grossing Indian film of the year. In the same year, she starred in the comedy-drama Aap Ki Khatir, opposite Vinod Khanna and Nadira. Her role as the poor girl won her awards from a number of film journalists' associations. In a retrospective review for The Hindu, the sport journalist and film critic Vijay Lokapally presumed that Rekha's role was challenging for her and appreciated her chemistry with Khanna; a Link reviewer praised its social themes. Film World awarded her with the Best Actress trophy for her work in Immaan Dharam, an action film that received mixed critical reviews. It features her as Durga, a Tamilian labourer who falls for the thief Mohan Kumar-Saxena (Shashi Kapoor). Cine Blitz praised Rekha for proving her talent in acting.

=== Turning point, stardom, and parallel cinema (1978–1984) ===
Rekha's turning point came in 1978, with her portrayal of a rape victim in the social drama Ghar. She plays Aarti, a newly married woman who gets gravely traumatized after being gang-raped. The film follows her character's struggle and trauma with the help of her husband (Vinod Mehra). The film was considered her first notable milestone, and her performance was acclaimed by both critics and audiences. Dinesh Raheja elaborated, "Ghar heralded the arrival of a mature Rekha. Her archetypal jubilance was replaced by her very realistic portrayal..." She received her first nomination for Best Actress at the Filmfare Awards. In that same year, her another release, Muqaddar Ka Sikandar, emerged as the biggest hit of that year, as well as one of the biggest hits of the decade, and Rekha was set as one of the most successful actresses of these times. The film opened to a positive critical reception, and Rekha's brief role as a tawaif named Zohrabai earned her a Best Supporting Actress nomination at the Filmfare. M. L. Dhawan of The Tribune noted her "smouldering intensity". Rekha recalled this phase as a period of self-discovery. Other films that year include Karmayogi.

Following Do Anjaane, speculation about a love affair with her co-star Amitabh Bachchan generated. Filmmakers at the time saw this as an opportunity to publicise their films by exploiting their alleged affair on-screen, as done in Mr. Natwarlal and Suhaag—both 1979 releases and highly popular with audiences. In Mr. Natwarlal, an action romance set in Calcutta, Rekha portrays the simple, village woman Shanoo to good reviews. Suhaag, like Muqaddar Ka Sikandar, featured her as a courtesan and became the year's highest-grossing picture.

The next two years were even more successful. In 1980, Rekha starred in the comedy Khubsoorat by Hrishikesh Mukherjee. In a role written specially for her, she played Manju Dayal, a young vivacious woman who visits her recently married sister and tries to bring joy to the wide family, much to the dissatisfaction of the matriarch of the household. Rekha said she easily identified with the bubbly nature of her character, calling it "quite a bit me". Khubsoorat, and Rekha's performance in it, were well received by reviewers, and the film was a financial success. At the Filmfare Awards, the film was named Best Film and Rekha won her first Best Actress award. The Tribune lauded Rekha's "spunky performance" for giving the film "its natural zing". Maang Bharo Sajana and Judaai, both directed by T. Rama Rao, and Saawan Kumar Tak's Saajan Ki Saheli, brought her further critical attention that year.

Rekha's alleged love affair speculation with Amitabh Bachchan culminated when they starred together in Yash Chopra's romantic drama Silsila. It was the most scandalous of their films together as it reflected the rumours by the press: Rekha played Bachchan's lover, while Bachchan's real-life wife Jaya Bachchan played his wife. The film was filmed secretly during 1980–1981, with Chopra not allowing the media to visit the shooting. Silsila was regarded by many journalists as "a casting coup", and this was the last collaboration between Rekha and Bachchan. The film premiered in July 1981 to critical and commercial failure, and Chopra attributed this to the casting, feeling the audience's attention was strictly focused on the speculation rather than the plot. India Today's Sunil Sethi saw that Rekha was "as synthetic as [Amitabh Bachchan's] tiresome chauvinism". Other films starring her that year include Ramesh Talwar's Baseraa and T. Rama Rao's Ek Hi Bhool (a remake of the 1981 Tamil film Mouna Geethangal) both box-office successes. She received another Filmfare Best Actress nomination for Jeevan Dhaara (1982), in which she played a young unmarried woman who is the sole breadwinner of her extended family.

During this period, Rekha was willing to expand her range beyond what she was given in mainstream films and started working in parallel cinema, a movement of Indian neo-realist art films. These films include Kalyug (1981), Umrao Jaan (1981), Vijeta (1982), Utsav (1984) and Ijaazat (1987). Umrao Jaan, a film adaptation of Mirza Hadi Ruswa's Urdu novel Umrao Jaan Ada (1905), saw Rekha in the title role of the poet and courtesan with a heart of gold from Lucknow in the 1840s. Made on a lavish production cost, the film follows Umrao's life story from her childhood as a girl named Amiran who is kidnapped and sold in a brothel to her position years later as a popular courtesan who seeks happiness amid love affairs and other tribulations. In preparation for the part, Rekha, who at the beginning of her career did not speak Hindi, took the task of learning the finer nuances of the Urdu language. Rekha was widely applauded for her performance, which has since been cited as one of her best work. Balu Bharatan of The Illustrated Weekly of India wrote of her "unexplored reserves of histronic strength". She was awarded the National Film Award for Best Actress and earned another Filmfare Award nomination, with Filmfare later considering this one of the most iconic performances of Bollywood history. She later claimed that the film was a turning point.

Among her work in art films, Shyam Benegal's Kalyug is a modern-day adaptation of the Indian mythological epic Mahabharata, depicted as an archetypal conflict between rival business houses. Rekha's role Supriya is based on Draupadi. Benegal cast her in the role after seeing her work in Khubsoorat and took further note of her being "very keen, very serious about her profession". Critic and author Vijay Nair described her performance as "a masterful interpretation of the modern Draupadi". Madhu Trehan complimented her for playing "flawlessly" the part of "a woman of intelligence, strength and a barely suppressed yearning for her young brother-in-law". The 1982 coming-of-age film Vijeta saw her as Neelima who struggles through her marital problems and tries to support her adolescent son, who, undecided about his future plans, eventually decides to join the Indian Air Force. She has since described the role as one of her favourite.

In Girish Karnad's erotic drama Utsav, based on Śūdraka's Sanskrit play Mṛcchakatika from the fourth century, she portrays the courtesan Vasantasena and, for her performance, was acknowledged as the Best Actress (Hindi) by the Bengal Film Journalists' Association. The film attracted wide coverage for its sensuality and Rekha's intimate scenes; she took this as a way to compete with female newcomers at the time. Utsav polarized both the audience and film reviewers with its script and direction; her work and costumes, however, were well received. A review in Asiaweek noted Rekha "dressed in little more than glittering jewellery". In 2003, Maithili Rao wrote, "Rekha—forever the first choice for the courtesan's role, be it ancient Hindu India or 19th-century Muslim Lucknow—is all statuesque sensuality..." In Gulzar's drama Ijaazat, Rekha and Naseeruddin Shah star as a divorced couple who meet unexpectedly for the first time after years of separation at a railway station, and recall together their life as a married couple and the conflicts which brought about their eventual split.

=== Setback and resurgence (1985–1989) ===
Apart from parallel cinema, Rekha took on other increasingly adventurous roles. She was among the early actresses to play lead roles in heroine-oriented revenge films, the first of which was Khoon Bhari Maang in 1988. Made by Rakesh Roshan specifically with Rekha in mind, the film featured her in the role Aarti Saxena, a wealthy, unassuming widow who narrowly survives an attempted murder by her scheming second husband and—presumed to be dead—returns to seek revenge under a concealed identity. She won her second Filmfare Award for her performance in the film. Rekha went on to describe Khoon Bhari Maang as "the first and only film I concentrated and understood all throughout." M.L. Dhawan from The Tribune, while documenting the famous Hindi films of 1988, remarked that Khoon Bhari Maang was "a crowning glory for Rekha, who rose like a phoenix ... and bedazzled the audience with her daredevilry." Encyclopædia Britannica's Encyclopædia of Hindi Cinema listed her role in the film as one of Hindi cinema's memorable female characters, noting it for changing "the perception of the ever-forgiving wife, turning her into an avenging angel." In a similar list by Screen magazine, the role was included as one of "ten memorable roles that made the Hindi film heroine proud."

In later interviews, Rekha has mentioned that receiving the Filmfare Award for this role was a surprise and a turning point that gave her reassurance and validation after taking a small break and getting eclipsed by younger stars. "All that applause from the film fraternity inspired me and made me realize that I am still wanted. I felt even more charged to give my best and knew right then, that this was my calling, what I was born to do, to make a difference in people's lives, through my performances."

=== Career fluctuations and short revival (1990–1999) ===
The 1990s saw a drop in Rekha's success. Few of her films were successful and many of her roles were condemned by reviewers. Critics still noted, however, that unlike most of the actresses of her generation, like Hema Malini and Raakhee, who succumbed to playing character parts, typically of mothers and aunts, Rekha was still playing leading roles at a time when younger female stars rose to fame. The first year of the decade saw four releases featuring Rekha, including Mera Pati Sirf Mera Hai and Amiri Garibi, all of which went unnoticed. Still recovering from the recent suicide of her husband and struggling with the ensuing press antagonism towards her, Rekha retained considerable success with her starring role as Namrata Singh, a young woman who joins the police force to avenge her husband's death in K. C. Bokadia's Phool Bane Angaray (1991). The film was a box-office hit and Rekha received a Best Actress nomination at Filmfare for her work, in reference to which Subhash K. Jha remarked, "Khaki never seemed sexier". The Indian Express wrote that she "rides horses, wields swords and does justice to the title in being phool (a flower) and becoming angaarey (burning coal)".

The public's acceptance of Phool Bane Angaray and Khoon Bhari Maang prompted several filmmakers to come with similar offers to Rekha, and she played such roles—labeled "avenging angels"—in several of her proceeding projects to a much less consequential effect. These included her next film Insaaf Ki Devi (1992), and later films such as Ab Insaf Hoga (1995) and Udaan (1997), all of which were major duds. She followed with a dual role of twin sisters in Shakti Samanta's Geetanjali opposite Jeetendra and the title role in the box-office disaster Madam X, in which she starred as a young woman hired by the police to impersonate a female underworld don.

Halfway through the decade, Rekha managed to halt her decline when she accepted several highly-controversial films, including Kama Sutra: A Tale of Love and Khiladiyon Ka Khiladi (1996). Kama Sutra, a foreign production directed by Mira Nair, was an erotic drama, and many felt her role of a Kama Sutra teacher in the film would damage her career. She was undeterred by the criticism. Todd McCarthy of Variety described her as "exquisitely composed" in the part. Khiladiyon Ka Khiladi, an action film directed by Umesh Mehra, was a major financial success, becoming one of the highest-grossing Indian films of the year. It featured Rekha in her first negative role as Madam Maya, a vicious gangster woman running a secret business of illegal wrestling matches in the US, who, during the course of the film, romances the much younger Akshay Kumar. Her portrayal earned her several awards, including the Filmfare Award for Best Supporting Actress and the Star Screen Award for Best Villain. In spite of the positive response to her performance from both fans and critics, she maintained on more than one occasion that she did not like herself in the film, noting that her work was not up to her own, personal standards.

Another controversial film at that time was Aastha: In the Prison of Spring (1997), where Basu Bhattacharya, making the last film of his career, cast her as a housewife who moonlights as a prostitute. Once again, she faced some scrutiny by sectors of the press and the audience for the nature of the part and for some of the explicit love scenes in the film. She later reacted: "...people had a lot to say about my role... I don't have problems playing anything. I've reached a stage where I could do justice to any role that came my way. It could be role of a mother, a sister-in-law; negative, positive, sensational or anything." Her performance earned her positive reviews and a Star Screen Award nomination, with India Today referring to her work as "her finest performance in years". She next acted in Qila (1998) and Mother (1999).

=== Recognition for character roles (2000–2006) ===
In the 2000s, Rekha appeared in relatively few movies. She started the decade with Bulandi, directed by T. Rama Rao. The other was Khalid Muhammad's Zubeidaa, co starring Karisma Kapoor and Manoj Vajapayee playing the first wife Maharani Mandira Devi of the King.

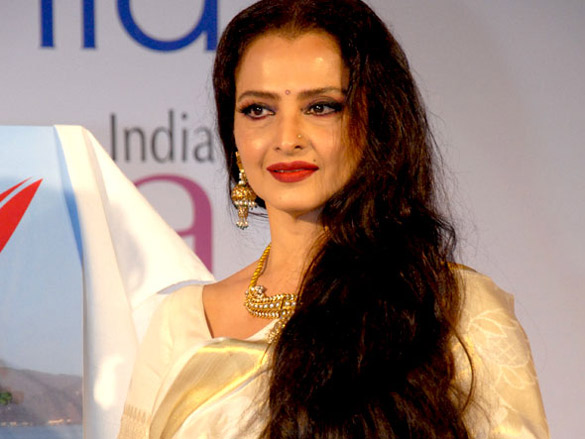
Rekha in 2010

In 2001, Rekha appeared in Rajkumar Santoshi's feminist drama Lajja, an ensemble piece inspired by a true incident of a woman being raped in Bawanipur two years before. The film follows the journey of a runaway wife (Manisha Koirala) and unfolds her story in three main chapters, each one presenting the story of a woman at whose place she stops. Rekha was the protagonist of the final chapter, around which the film's inspiration revolves, playing Ramdulari, an oppressed Dalit village woman and social activist who becomes a victim of gangrape. Speaking of the film, Rekha commented, "I am Lajja and Lajja is me". Highly praised for her portrayal, she received several nominations for her work, including the Filmfare Award and the International Indian Film Academy Award (IIFA) for Best Supporting Actress. Taran Adarsh wrote that "it is Rekha who walks away with the glory, delivering one of the finest performances the Indian screen has seen in the recent times."

In Rakesh Roshan's science-fiction film Koi... Mil Gaya, Rekha played Sonia Mehra, a single mother to a developmentally disabled young man, played by Hrithik Roshan. The movie was a financial and critical success and became the most popular film of the year; it won the Filmfare Award for Best Film, among others. Rekha received another Best Supporting Actress nomination at the Filmfare for her performance, which Khalid Mohamed described as "astutely restrained".

In 2005, Rekha guest starred in an item number in connection with the song "Kaisi Paheli Zindagani", in Pradeep Sarkar's "Parineeta". In Bachke Rehna Re Baba (2005), Rekha played a con woman who, along with her niece, uses one scheme to rob men of their property. The film was a major critical failure. Mid-Day remarked, "why Rekha chose to sign this film is a wonder," noting that she is "riddled with bad dialogue, terrible cakey makeup and tawdry styling". This was followed in 2006 by Kudiyon Ka Hai Zamana, a poorly received sex comedy about four female friends and their personal troubles. In a scathing review, Indu Mirani noted that "Rekha hams like she was never going to do another film." In a 2007 article by Daily News and Analysis, critic Deepa Gahlot directed an advice to Rekha: "Please pick movies with care, one more like Bach Ke Rehna Re Baba and Kudiyon Ka Hai Zamana and the diva status is under serious threat."

In 2006, she reprised the role of Sonia Mehra in Krrish, Rakesh Roshan's sequel to Koi... Mil Gaya. In this superhero feature, the story moves 20 years forward and focuses on the character of Sonia's grandson Krishna (played again by Hrithik Roshan), whom she has brought up single-handedly after the death of her son Rohit, and who turns out to have supernatural powers. Krrish became the second-highest grossing picture of the year and, like its prequel, was declared a blockbuster. It received mostly positive notices from critics, and Rekha's work earned her another Filmfare nomination in the supporting category. Ronnie Scheib from Variety noted her for bringing "depth to her role as the nurturing grandmother".

=== Occasional work; hiatus (2007–present) ===
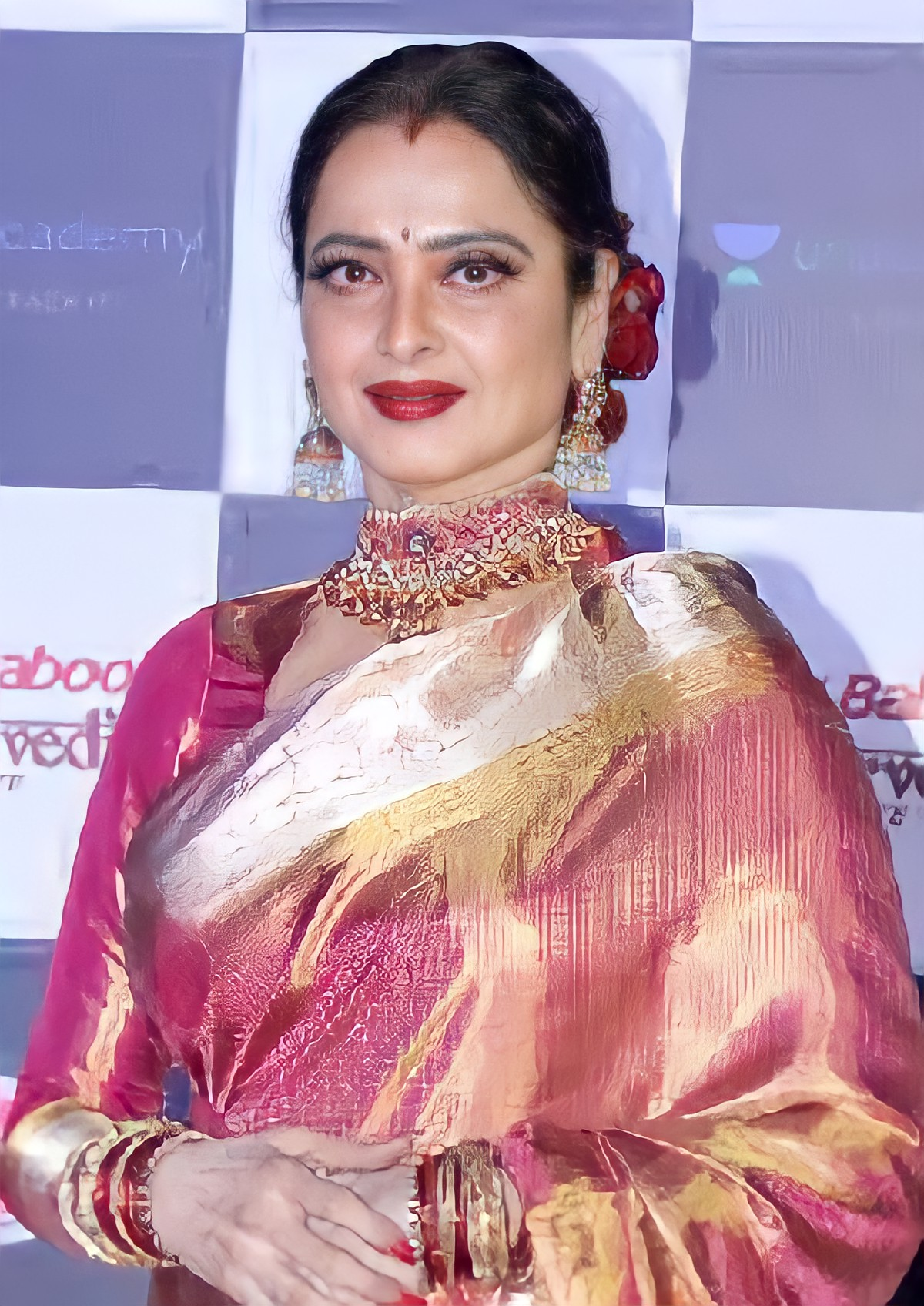
Rekha in 2019

In 2007, she once again portrayed a courtesan in Goutam Ghose's Yatra. Unlike the initial success she experienced in playing such roles in the early stages of her career, this time the film failed to do well. In 2010, Rekha was awarded the Padma Shri, the 4th highest civilian award given by the Government of India.

Rekha starred in the 2010 film Sadiyaan alongside Hema Malini and Rishi Kapoor. The film marked the debut of Shatrughan Sinha's son Luv Sinha. The film failed to do well at the box office.

In 2014, Rekha was working on Abhishek Kapoor's Fitoor, but left the film for unknown reasons and later Tabu was signed as her replacement. In 2014 she also worked in Super Nani released on Diwali (24 October). Super Nani was a family drama, in which the grandmother (Rekha) is unappreciated by her children and husband, Randhir Kapoor. Her grandson, Sharman Joshi convinces her to change. The grandmother 'transforms' herself into a glamorous model.

In 2015, she appeared in R. Balki's Shamitabh, playing herself.

== Personal life and off-screen work ==
In 1990, Rekha married Delhi-based industrialist Mukesh Aggarwal. Aggarwal was a self-made entrepreneur and owner of the kitchenware brand Hotline. He is believed to have had a long-standing struggle with depression and according to Rekha's biographers, she only found out about his mental health after marriage. He was introduced to Rekha through a mutual friend and fashion designer Bina Ramani who termed him Rekha's 'crazy fan'. Their marriage took place on 4 March 1990, and a few months later—while she was in London—he died by suicide, after several previous attempts, leaving a note, "Don't blame anyone". She was pilloried by the press at that time, a period which one journalist termed as "the deepest trough in her life." Bhawana Somaaya observed the period speaking of "a strong anti-wave against the actress — some called her a witch, some a murderess," but added that soon "Rekha came out of the eclipse once again unblemished!"

She was rumoured to have been married to actor Vinod Mehra in 1973, but in a 2004 television interview with Simi Garewal she denied ever being married to Mehra, referring to him as a "well-wisher" and a close friend. Rekha currently lives in her Bandra home in Mumbai.

Critics noted Rekha for having worked hard to perfect her Hindi and acting, and media reporters often discussed how she had transformed herself from a "plump" duckling to a "swan" in the early 1970s. Rekha's credits to this transformation were yoga, a nutritious diet, and a regular, disciplined life. In 1983, her diet and yoga practice were published in a book called "Rekha's Mind and Body Temple". Rekha has no children. She is a self-proclaimed eggetarian.

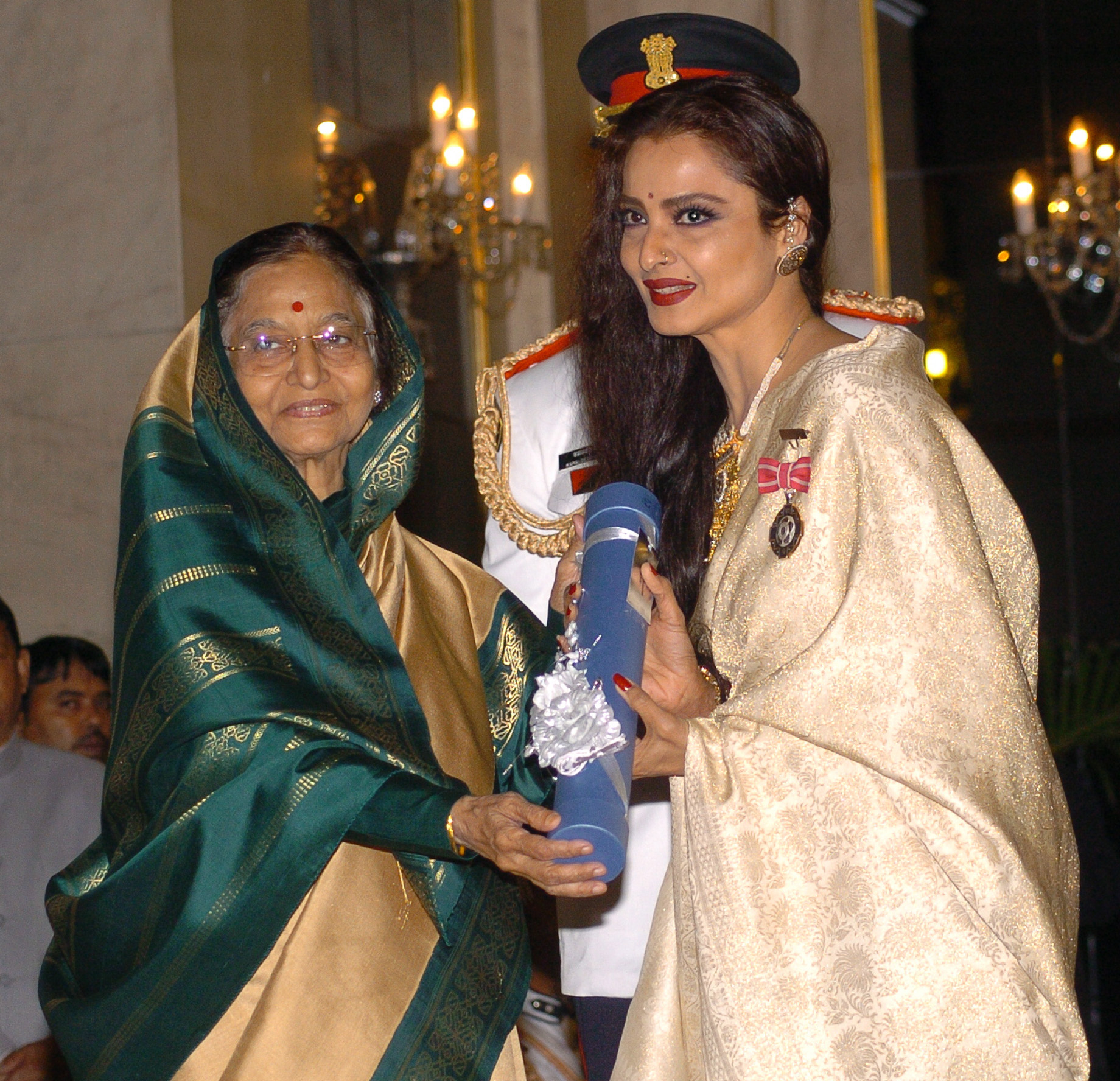
Rekha receiving Padma Shri by the then President Pratibha Patil in 2010.

In 2012, Rekha was nominated as a Member of Parliament to the Rajya Sabha, the upper house of the bicameral Parliament of India. She was appointed to the position by President Pratibha Patil on the recommendation of Prime Minister Manmohan Singh for her contribution in the field of art (in accordance with article 80 of the Constitution of India which allows the President to nominate 12 members to the House for their expertise in specific fields). Her tenure started on 27 April 2012 and ended on the same day in 2018. She took part in the Consumer Affairs, Food and Public Distribution committee, but, like with other nominated members, her six-year term concluded amidst criticism for her low attendance as well as minimal participation in the House. This concern had been previously raised with respect to Rekha and other nominated members during their incumbency, but several elected members came to their defense, asserting that the active presence of those nominated to the House was not obligatory and that they could contribute in other ways through their position.

== Image and artistry ==
"There has never been anyone quite like Rekha. Tempestuous woman. Troublemaker extraordinary. A woman once known, never quite forgotten. And an accomplished actress who can often startle you with a truly great performance."

— The Illustrated Weekly of India on Rekha, 1986

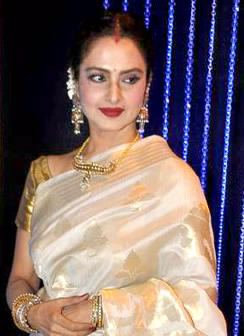
Rekha in 2013

Rekha's status in the film industry has been discussed in light of her change over the years, screen persona, and performances. Writing for The Tribune, Mukesh Khosla was impressed with her transformation from "the giggling village belle in Saawan Bhadon to one of country's reigning actresses". Hindustan Times described her physical change and loss of weight as "one of cinema's and perhaps real life's most dramatic transformations," arguing that "Rekha morphed from an overweight, dark ordinary girl into a glamorous and beautiful enigma". According to critic Omar Qureshi, "the term diva (in India) was coined for Rekha." Mira Nair, who directed Rekha in Kama Sutra (1997), likens her to a "Jamini Roy painting" and says, "Like Marilyn Monroe is shorthand for sex, Rekha is shorthand for charisma". Filmmaker Sanjay Leela Bhansali labels her the "last of the great stars".

Respected for her acting prowess, Rekha has been described by critics as one of Hindi cinema's finest actresses. Filmfare described her acting style, writing that in terms of "style, sexiness or sheer onscreen presence, she's unparalleled" and arguing that she is "a fierce, raw, flinty performer with unbridled honesty. Her acting isn't gimmicky." Critic Khalid Mohamed commends her technical control: "She knows how to give and to what degree. She has all that it takes to be a director. There is a kind of vulnerability in her control. She explores when she is acting." Shyam Benegal, who directed her in two movies, believes she is "a director's actress". M.L. Dhawan from The Tribune wrote, "Rekha's flowering as an actress post Ghar and Khubsoorat climaxed in [...] Umrao Jaan. As a tragic courtesan she gave a performance of quality artistry, adopting a much-admired huskiness and despondency of tone. Rekha communicated much with a delicately raised eyebrow". In 2010, Filmfare included two of her performances—from Khubsoorat (1980) and Umrao Jaan (1981)—in their list of "80 Iconic Performances". Her work in the latter was included on Forbes India's list of "25 Greatest Acting Performances of Indian Cinema". In 2011, Rediff listed her as the ninth-greatest Indian actress of all time, noting, "It's hard not to be bowled over by Rekha's longevity, or her ability to reinvent herself... the actress took on a man's job and did it stunningly well, holding her own against all the top actors and being remembered despite them." In 2023, Rajeev Masand listed her in a similar list by India Today.

Despite appreciation toward achievements in her professional career, Rekha's public image has often been interwoven in the media with speculations about her personal life and relationships. Known for her tendency to shun publicity, Rekha has gained a reputation for being mysterious and reclusive, which drew media comparisons to Greta Garbo. Hindustan Times argues that Rekha has shrouded "her life in an intriguing Garbo-like mystery". According to Rediff, "Rekha's reclusive nature has gone a long way towards building an aura of mystery around her." Rekha rarely gives interviews, and she mostly avoids parties and events. Asked once about her mysterious image, she denied several times trying to live up to this image, asserting it is press-created: "What mystery? The media is the one that creates this image. It's just that I am basically shy by nature, an introvert and fiercely private." Film journalist Anupama Chopra, who visited Rekha in 2003, wrote that while tabloids had portrayed her as "a reclusive woman twisted bitter by lecherous men and loneliness", in reality Rekha was "none of these", describing her as "chatty and curious, excited and energetic, cheerful and almost illegally optimistic".

She was named the reigning Queen of Indian Cinema at the 2012 IIFA Awards held in Singapore, where she was given the "Outstanding Contribution to Indian Cinema" award, the function's Lifetime Achievement Award. In 1999, the columnist-turned-author Mohan Deep published the first biography about her, titled Eurekha!: The Intimate Life Story of Rekha (1999). Another biography was released by the journalist Yasser Usman in 2016 under the title of Rekha: The Untold Story.

== See also ==
- Rekha filmography
- List of Indian film actresses

== Bibliography ==
- Deep, Mohan (1999). Eurekha!: The Intimate Life Story of Rekha. Shivani Publications. ISBN 978-81-90107-90-7.
- Bumiller, Elisabeth (1 June 1991). May You Be the Mother of a Hundred Sons. Penguin Books. p. 185. ISBN 978-0-14-015671-3.
- Chaudhuri, Diptakirti (2014). Bollybook: The Big Book of Hindi Movie Trivia. Penguin Books. ISBN 978-93-5118-799-8. Archived from the original on 20 April 2021.
- Dasgupta, Rohit K.; Datta, Sangeeta (2018). 100 Essential Indian Films. Rowman & Littlefield. ISBN 978-1-4422-7799-1.
- Dwyer, Rachel (25 July 2019) [2002]. Yash Chopra: Fifty Years in Indian Cinema. London, United Kingdom: British Film Institute. ISBN 978-1-83902-131-2.
- Dwyer, Rachel (25 July 2019) [2005]. 100 Bollywood Films. Bloomsbury Publishing. ISBN 978-81-7436-433-3.
- Gahlot, Deepa (2015). Sheroes: 25 Daring Women of Bollywood. Westland Publication. pp. 29–34. ISBN 978-93-85152-74-0. Archived from the original on 20 April 2021.
- Ganti, Tejaswini (2004). Bollywood: A Guidebook to Popular Hindi Cinema. Routledge. ISBN 978-0-415-28853-8. Archived from the original on 10 October 2019.
- Garga, Bhagwan Das (1996). So Many Cinemas: The Motion Picture in India. Eminence Designs. ISBN 978-81-90060-21-9. Archived from the original on 22 October 2021.
- Gulzar; Nihalani, Govind; Chatterjee, Saibal (26 February 2003). Encyclopaedia of Hindi Cinema. Encyclopædia Britannica, Inc. ISBN 978-81-7991-066-5.
- K. Jha, Subhash; Bachchan, Amitabh (2005). The Essential Guide to Bollywood. Lustre Press. ISBN 978-81-7436-378-7.
- Rajadhyaksha, Ashish; Willemen, Paul (1999). Encyclopedia of Indian Cinema. Routledge. ISBN 978-1-135-94325-7.
- Ray, Bibekananda (2005). Conscience of The Race. Publication Division. ISBN 978-81-230-2661-9.
- Thoraval, Yves (2000). The Cinemas of India. Macmillan India. ISBN 978-0-333-93410-4.
- Usman, Yasser (24 August 2016). Rekha: The Untold Story. New Delhi, India: Juggernaut Books. ISBN 978-81-93284-18-6.
