= Mere Sajna =

- Directed by: Kewal Kumar
- Starring: Navin Nischol; Raakhee
- Music by: Laxmikant-Pyarelal
- Release date: 1975
- Country: India
- Language: Hindi

Mere Sajna is a 1975 Bollywood film directed by Kewal Kumar. The film stars Raakhee and Navin Nischol. Helen and Ajit are part of the supporting cast. The music is by the composing duo Laxmikant-Pyarelal. Lyrics are by Majrooh Sultanpuri.

== Plot ==
Ratan (Navin Nischol) is a criminal working for Master (Ajit) and his wife Sona (Helen). He goes home to his mother's funeral and meets with his childhood friend Kammo (Raakhee), who is mentally incompetent. Her wealthy father arranges her marriage to Ratan, with the hope that she will become normal after marriage. Initially, Sona is disappointed that Ratan will marry, as she has a crush on him. But once it becomes clear that Ratan wants to marry Kammo for her money, both she and the Master fully support it. They also encourage Ratan to kill Kammo soon after marriage. Ratan starts caring about Kammo and she becomes more normal. Ratan wants to break free of Master and Sona, but they won't let him. Master's henchmen kidnap Kammo and Ratan rescues her, and Master dies in the climactic fight.

== Songs ==
Lyrics: Anand Bakshi

1. "Maine Kuch Khoya Hai Maine Kuch Paya Hai" – Kishore Kumar
2. "Mere Sajna Teri Khair Mange" – Lata Mangeshkar
3. "Paani Ki Boond Aisi" – Lata Mangeshkar
4. "Tumhari Aankh Se Joda Hai" – Asha Bhosle
5. "Ye Kaun Hansa" – Lata Mangeshkar
