= Shiv Charan =

- Poster
- Directed by: Anil Kumar
- Written by: Shaukat Jamali
- Produced by: B. Chopra
- Starring: Navin Nischol; Vinod Mehra; Zarina Wahab; Prema Narayan
- Music by: Bappi Lahiri
- Release date: 1982
- Country: India
- Language: Hindi

Shiv Charan is a 1982 Bollywood drama film directed by K. Anil Kumar starring Navin Nischol, Vinod Mehra, Zarina Wahab, Prema Narayan in lead roles.

== Cast ==
- Navin Nischol as Shiv
- Vinod Mehra as Charan
- Zarina Wahab as Bijli
- Prema Narayan as Roopa
- Om Shivpuri as Charandas
- Keshto Mukherjee as Sweeper
- Helen as Dancer

== Soundtrack ==
The soundtrack was composed by Bappi Lahiri and written by Amit Khanna.

1. "Yeh Husn Yeh Shabab" – Chandrani Mukherjee, Anwar Hussain
2. "Bijli Mai Hu Bijli" – Chandrani Mukherjee
3. "Dil Mujhse Kahe Mai Tumse Ke" – Bappi Lahiri, Annette Pinto
4. "Koi Kab Talak Yahan Yun Hi" – Mahendra Kapoor, Kishore Kumar
5. "Meri Hai Jawani" – Asha Bhosle
