= Barkha Bahar =

- Directed by: Amar Kumar Godara
- Produced by: Prahlad Kumar Godara; Amar Kumar Godara
- Starring: Navin Nischol; Rekha
- Music by: Laxmikant-Pyarelal
- Release date: 1973
- Country: India
- Language: Hindi

Barkha Bahar is a 1973 Bollywood romance film.The film stars Navin Nischol and Rekha in lead roles. The film is directed and produced by Amar Kumar Godara, along with his brother Prahlad Kumar Godara as a producer.

'Barkha Bahar' was originally supposed to be Rekha's debut film, but it was released after several other projects she had already worked on."

== Cast ==
- Navin Nischol as Rahul Singh
- Rekha as Ganga
- Helen
- Murad
- Hiralal
- Dulari

== Soundtrack ==
| Song | Singer |
|---|---|
| "Door Se Aanewale Bata Kis Haal Mein Hai" | Mahendra Kapoor, Manhar Udhas |
| "Nazar Ka Yeh Paigham Diya Jo Aapne Mere Naam" | Mohammed Rafi, Lata Mangeshkar |
| "Chham Chham Rut Barse" | Lata Mangeshkar |
| "Badra Garje, Jiyara Tarse" | Lata Mangeshkar |
| "Jala De Tu Hi Koi Aag" | Asha Bhosle |
