= Sansar (1971 film) =

- Directed by: Dilip Bose
- Starring: Navin Nischol; Anupama; Nirupa Roy
- Music by: Chitragupt; Sahir Ludhianvi (lyrics)
- Release date: 1971
- Country: India
- Language: Hindi

Sansar is a 1971 Bollywood drama film directed by Dilip Bose. The film stars Navin Nischol, Abhi Bhattacharya, Anupama and Nirupa Roy.

== Cast ==
- Navin Nischol as Ajay
- Abhi Bhattacharya as Hari
- Anupama as Kamla
- Nirupa Roy as Shobha

== Soundtrack ==
The music score for this movie was by Chitragupta. Poet Sahir Ludhianvi penned the lyrics for seven songs in the movie. Two of the numbers went on to become very popular : Bas Ab Tarsaana Chhodo (Kishore Kumar and Asha Bhonsle) and Haathon Mein Kitaab Baalon Mein Gulaab (Kishore Kumar)

=== Tracklist ===
No.	Title	Singer(s)	Length
1.	""Tamasha Dekho Zamana""	Kishore Kumar
2.	""Haathon Mein Kitaab""	Kishore Kumar
3.	""Mile Jitni Sharaab""	Kishore Kumar
4.	""Bas Ab Tarana Chhodo""	Kishore Kumar, Asha Bhosle
