= Mane Devru =

1993 film by V. Ravichandran

- Directed by: V. Ravichandran
- Written by: K. Bhagyaraj
- Based on: Mouna Geethangal (1981) by K. Bhagyaraj
- Produced by: Meena Sujatha
- Starring: V. Ravichandran; Sudharani; K. S. Ashwath
- Cinematography: G. S. V. Seetharam
- Edited by: K. Balu
- Music by: Hamsalekha
- Production company: Adithya Movie Creations
- Release date: 1993
- Running time: 134 minutes
- Country: India
- Language: Kannada

Mane Devru is a 1993 Indian Kannada language romantic drama film directed and enacted by V. Ravichandran along with Sudharani pairing together for the first time. The supporting cast featured K. S. Ashwath, Tennis Krishna, Disco Shanti among others.

The film was a remake of K. Bhagyaraj's 1981 Tamil-language film Mouna Geethangal.

== Cast ==
- V. Ravichandran as Ranganath
- Sudharani as Janaki
- K. S. Ashwath
- Disco Shanti
- Tennis Krishna
- Umesh
- Sathyajit
- Kashi
- Venki
- Shanthamma
- Dingri Nagaraj
- Sadashiva Brahmavar

== Soundtrack ==
Mane Devru

Soundtrack album by Hamsalekha
- Released: 8 October 1993
- Recorded: 1993
- Genre: Feature film soundtrack
- Length: 28:17
- Language: Kannada
- Label: Akash Audio

=== Tracks ===
Hamsalekha composed the film's soundtrack and wrote the lyrics.

Track listing
No.	Title	Singer(s)	Length
1.	"Arambha Premadaramba"	S. P. Balasubrahmanyam, K. S. Chithra
2.	"Aparanji Chinnavo"	Mano, K. S. Chithra
3.	"Neene Nanna Neene Nanna"	S. P. Balasubrahmanyam, S. Janaki
4.	"Thappu Madodu Sahaja Kano"	S. P. Balasubrahmanyam, S. Janaki
5.	"Appa Appa Nange"	Mano, K. S. Chithra
6.	"Jeevana Eru Perina"	S. P. Balasubrahmanyam
7.	"Sundari Sundari"	S. P. Balasubrahmanyam, S. Janaki
