= Mouna Geethangal =

1981 film by K. Bhagyaraj

- Poster
- Directed by: K. Bhagyaraj
- Written by: K. Bhagyaraj
- Produced by: K. Gobinathan
- Starring: K. Bhagyaraj; Saritha
- Cinematography: B. S. Basaviraj
- Edited by: T. Rajasekhar
- Music by: Gangai Amaran
- Production company: Bhagavathi Creations
- Release date: 23 January 1981
- Running time: 148 minutes
- Country: India
- Language: Tamil

Mouna Geethangal (transl. Silent Melodies) is a 1981 Indian Tamil-language romantic comedy drama film written and directed by K. Bhagyaraj. The film stars Bhagyaraj himself alongside Saritha, with S. Krishnamoorthy and Master Suresh in supporting roles. It revolves around a man attempting to reconcile with his estranged ex-wife after five years.

The inspiration for the story came to Bhagyaraj from Jayakanthan's short story Unmai Sudum, and his own personal life. The film was produced by K. Gobinathan under Bhagavathi Creations, photographed by B. S. Basaviraj and edited by T. Rajasekhar, with music composed by Gangai Amaran. When the film was still under production, Bhagyaraj published the story as a serial in the magazine Kumudam.

Mouna Geethangal was released on 23 January 1981, and became a commercial success, running for over 25 weeks in theatres, and has been remade in several other Indian languages. The same year, it was remade in Hindi as Ek Hi Bhool and in Telugu as Sathyabhama. In 1991 it was remade in Malayalam as Chanchattam and in 1993 in Kannada as Mane Devru.

== Plot ==
A young woman and her son board a bus bound for Madras. Another man later boards the same bus, and is shocked on seeing the woman and the boy.

In a flashback, the man (Raghunathan) and the woman (Suguna) appear for the same job interview. When Suguna learns that Raghu is more qualified than her and has better chances of getting selected, she poses as the manager of the organisation and tells Raghu that the vacancy is already filled, and he would be considered for a vacancy that is likely to arise after a week. Raghu believes her and leaves, and Suguna gets selected. Soon, Raghu lands at Suguna's house with gifts for her family members and pressurises Suguna to recommend his name for the vacancy she had discussed with him. Suguna gets worried and tries to avoid Raghu. Coincidentally, a vacancy arises and when an advertisement is released, Raghu attends the interview. Impressed with Raghu's qualifications and talents, the owner appoints him as the Assistant Manager. On joining duty, Raghu learns of Suguna's manipulation. Though initially angered, he gets attracted to her intelligence and falls in love with her. She returns his love and they marry.

After marriage, Suguna quits her job and becomes a housewife. She becomes possessive of Raghu and slightly insecure about his fidelity, vowing to commit suicide if he is ever unfaithful to her. Raghu leads a righteous life with her. He gets introduced to Suguna's friend Jaya, a widow, who seeks the couple's help to sort out an issue relating to her deceased husband's insurance claim. At Suguna's request, Raghu helps Jaya. Later when Raghu is going to Jaya's house, his clothes become soiled and he goes to a bathroom at Jaya's house to wash up. Jaya and Raghu end up having sex, but later regret it. Unable to cope with suppressing this fact from Suguna, Raghu comes home drunk. Raghu's behaviour makes Suguna suspicious and she discovers the truth. Devastated, she returns to her parents' house. Suguna's father says that her life should be with her husband, otherwise she should live on her own. Suguna files for and is granted divorce, later realising she is pregnant. She delivers a boy named Suresh and struggles with him.

In the present, set five years later, Suguna and Suresh travel to Madras by bus, and they meet Raghu. After reaching Madras, Suguna sees that Raghu is the new manager in her office. She tries to resign, but ultimately does not. Raghu tries to justify his predicament but Suguna continues to avoid him. He leases the house opposite Suguna's and tries to befriend Suresh, much to Suguna's annoyance. Suresh realises that Raghu is his father and bonds with him. Meanwhile, Suguna berates a colleague for inappropriate behaviour and he apologises, slowly comes closer to Suguna and she earns his trust. When Suguna learns that Raghu leaves office everyday to be with their son, she tries to threaten him. Raghu gives her 30 days to return to him, threatening to take a strong decision if she fails. During these 30 days, various incidents taking place in Suguna's life change her perception about men, specifically Raghu. Suguna learns that Raghu had been financially supporting her father.

Later, the colleague whom Suguna trusted boasts to the other employees about having an affair with Suguna. To "prove" it, he enacts a drama. He asks her to come to a lodge to take her son, who is believed to have been kidnapped, but locks her in the room. 15 minutes later, he goes out and pretends to have had sex with her. As a result, the entire office speaks ill of Suguna. She is devastated, but becomes pleasantly surprised when she overhears Raghu's comment on her character. Raghu says she is like fire as she would never allow anyone to touch her; if they did, she would burn them and herself. Raghu beats the colleague and forces him to openly confess to his plot. Suguna regrets misunderstanding Raghu and not forgiving him. She decides to return to Raghu, only to realise the 30-day deadline has ended, and he is remarrying. Suguna fails to stop the marriage and decides to commit suicide along with Suresh; he refuses and requests to live with his father. Before Suguna can commit suicide, however, she learns that the "remarriage" was merely an act. The family reunites.

== Cast ==
- K. Bhagyaraj as Raghunathan
- Saritha as Suguna
- Kallapetti Singaram as Singaram
- S. Krishnamoorthy as the colleague
- T. S. Seshathiri as Suguna's father
- Kullamani as a peon
- Sivaraman as a co-passenger in bus
- Shanmugasundaram
- Senthil
- Master Suresh as Suresh
- V. K. Padmini
- Meenakshi Paatti as Suguna's grandmother
- Gemini Rajeshwari as Maami
- Kovai Senthil as Senthil (uncredited role)

== Production ==
The inspiration for the story of Mouna Geethangal came to K. Bhagyaraj from Unmai Sudum, a short story by Jayakanthan, and Bhagyaraj's own personal life. Bhagyaraj's then fiancé was possessive about him during their courtship days, and could not tolerate even small mistakes from him. In an interview with S. Shiva Kumar for Mid-Day, Bhagyaraj said, "Mouna Geethangal is a real story. It is something that happens to everybody or his neighbour". Besides writing the script and directing, Bhagyaraj also starred as the lead actor. The film was produced by K. Gobinathan under Bhagavathi Creations, photographed by B. S. Basaviraj and edited by T. Rajasekhar. When the film was still under production, Bhagyaraj published the story as a serial in the magazine Kumudam.

== Soundtrack ==
The music was composed by Gangai Amaran. The song "Mookuthi Poo Melae" is set in Mayamalavagowla raga.

Track listing
No.	Title	Lyrics	Singer(s)	Length
1.	"Mookuthi Poo Melae"	Vaali	K. J. Yesudas, S. Janaki	4:51
2.	"Daddy Daddy"	Muthulingam	Malaysia Vasudevan, S. Janaki	4:02
3.	"Mookuthi Poo Melae" (sad)	Vaali	S. P. Balasubrahmanyam	4:37
4.	"Masamo Margazhi Maasam"	Kannadasan	Malaysia Vasudevan, S. Janaki	4:14
Total length:				17:44

== Release and reception ==
Mouna Geethangal was released on 23 January 1981. On 8 February 1981, Ananda Vikatan gave the film an A rating, praising the screenplay and Bhagyaraj for integrating humour into the main story rather than making it a subplot. The reviewer also praised the lead actors for living through their roles. The Indian Express wrote, "Mouna Geethangal is a different movie, good for a family audience". Nalini Sastry of Kalki praised Bhagyaraj's script, direction and acting while also praising the acting of Saritha and the child actor who she felt dominates everyone; she also praised the music, cinematography and editing. The film was a commercial success, running for over 25 weeks in Indian theatres. It was also successful in Malaysia, where it grossed almost $100,000 during its 43-day run in three theatres at Kuala Lumpur.

== Remakes ==
Mouna Geethangal was remade in Hindi as Ek Hi Bhool and in Telugu as Sathyabhama, both released in 1981. In 1991 it was remade in Malayalam as Chanchattam and in 1993 in Kannada as Mane Devru.

== Bibliography ==
- Arunachalam, Param (2020). BollySwar: 1981–1990. Mavrix Infotech. ISBN 9788193848227.
- Dhananjayan, G. (2011). The Best of Tamil Cinema, 1931 to 2010: 1977–2010. Galatta Media. OCLC 733724281.
- Sundararaman (2007) [2005]. Raga Chintamani: A Guide to Carnatic Ragas Through Tamil Film Music (2nd ed.). Pichhamal Chintamani. OCLC 295034757.
