= Geetanjali (1993 film) =

- Theatrical release poster
- Directed by: Shakti Samanta
- Written by: Rahi Masoom Reza; Ajay Kartik (dialogues); Indeevar (lyrics)
- Screenplay by: Sachin Bhowmick
- Story by: Sachin Bhowmick
- Produced by: Shakti Samanta
- Starring: Jeetendra; Rekha
- Cinematography: Aloke Das Gupta
- Edited by: Sudhir Verma
- Music by: Bappi Lahiri
- Production company: Shakti Films
- Release date: 28 May 1993
- Running time: 152 minutes
- Country: India
- Language: Hindi

Geetanjali is a 1993 Hindi-language romance film, produced and directed by Shakti Samanta under the Shakti Films banner. It stars Jeetendra, Rekha and music composed by Bappi Lahiri.

== Cast ==
- Jeetendra as Professor Sagar Bhardwaj
- Rekha as Geeta / Anjali (Double Role)
- Dalip Tahil as P. D.
- Asrani as Ramprasad Durgaprasad Tiwari
- Ajit Vachani as Makhnani
- Vijay Arora as Sagar's Brother-in-Law
- Anita Kanwal as Sagar's Elder Sister
- Ram Mohan as Principal Ghosh
- Dinesh Thakur as Vice-Principal Sharma
- Achyut Potdar as Professor Iyer
- Sushmita Mukherjee as Seeta
- Amita Nangia as Kaveri Saxena

== Soundtrack ==
Song	Singer
"Badra Chhaye"	Kavita Krishnamurthy
"Bina Tumhare Chaar Kadam Bhi"	Kavita Krishnamurthy, Kumar Sanu
"Pyar Ke Rishte Jud Jate Hai"	Kavita Krishnamurthy, Kumar Sanu
"Tumhe Chahta Hoon"	Kumar Sanu
"Dil Aaj Sambhaloon"	Alka Yagnik
"Aap Ke Shehar Mein"	Alka Yagnik
"I Love You"	Asha Bhosle
