= Navin Nischol =

Indian actor

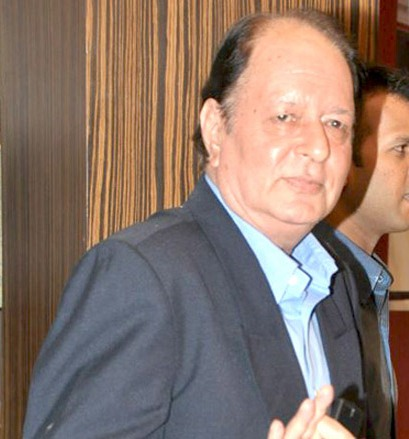
- Born: 11 April 1946; Lahore, Punjab, British India
- Died: 19 March 2011 (aged 64); Mumbai, Maharashtra, India
- Occupation: Actor
- Years active: 1970–2011
- Spouses: Neelu Kapoor (divorced) Geetanjali Nischol (died 2006)
- Children: 2
- Relatives: Praveen Nischol (brother)
- Family: Anand–Sahni family (through marriage)

Navin Nischol (11 April 1946 – 19 March 2011) was an Indian actor. He made his debut with the Hindi film Sawan Bhadon in 1970.

== Early life ==
Navin Nischol studied in Bangalore Military School, Bangalore, erstwhile King George Royal India Military College, Bangalore. He was the first gold medalist from the Film and Television Institute of India to make it big. He starred in several superhit films such as Victoria No. 203 (1972), Dhund (1973) and Aashiq Banaya Aapne (2005). Hanste Zakhm was the great breakthrough of his career. Later on, Nischol switched to character roles and carved out a successful career for himself on television. One of his most successful serials on television was Dekh Bhai Dekh, co-starring Sushma Seth, Shekhar Suman and Farida Jalal. He also starred in the Punjabi films Aasra Pyar Da (1983), Sawa Lakh Se Ek Ladaun (1976) and Mahaul Theek Hai (1999).

== Personal life ==
Navin's first marriage was to Dev Anand's niece Neelu Kapur, sister of Shekhar Kapur.

Navin later married divorcee Geetanjali. On 24 April 2006, Geetanjali hanged herself at her residence. She blamed Navin and his brother Pravin for her suicide.

== Death ==
Nischol died of a heart attack on 19 March 2011 en route from Mumbai to Pune. He was 64 years old. Naveen had two daughters, Natasha and Nomita, from his first marriage.

=== Reactions ===
Rishi Kapoor, Bollywood actor, said "I had directed Navin in Aa Ab Laut Chalein. A good looking man and a good human being. Very cultured and a great conversationalist. I bumped into him after ages at the Otters Club on Friday night. I don't frequent Otters Club. So in hindsight it all seems providential. The next morning he was supposed to drive with producer Gawa (Gurdeep Singh) and my brother Daboo (Randhir Kapoor) to Pune to spend a quiet Holi there. But before Gawa and Navin could reach Daboo, Navin asked Gawa to lower AC in the car. Then he just slumped and died... Just like that! It's too shocking and sad."

Vipul Shah, Bollywood director, said "He was a regular at my dear friend Manmohan Shetty's parties. A really soft-spoken and cultured man. It is sad that his career didn't take off again after Khosla Ka Ghosla."

Dibakar Banerjee, who directed Navin Nischol in Khosla Ka Ghosla, said: "He was an effortless actor, superb technically. He had a pickled sense of humour. He had been through all the turns of life that an actor could possibly experience. My misfortune that I couldn't work with him again. I dearly wanted to."

Kunal Kohli, producer of Break Ke Baad, recalled, "He was a thorough gentleman. A very warm person. I had wonderful conversations with him. He shared stories of past films and filmmakers with me. I'd just listen to him as enraptured as a child hearing fairy tales. In the evening of his life he wanted to share his experiences. I feel privileged I spent evenings hearing him talk about the past. I think I'm a richer human being because of those evenings with Navinji."

Shabana Azmi, Bollywood actress, said "I remember Navin fondly. He was an underrated actor who had a very good voice and flawless diction both of which are rare. His performance in Lekh Tandon's Ek Baar Kaho is gentle, sophisticated and memorable. He used to often reminisce about his overnight stardom and the cruelty with which it was snatched away. It made him sometimes bitter, sometimes philosophical but he came to terms with it and moved on. His performance in Nagesh Kukoonoor's film Bollywood Calling as an aging film star was very moving. My condolences to the family."

== Filmography ==
| Year | Film | Role | Notes |
|---|---|---|---|
| 1970 | Sawan Bhadon | Vikram | |
| 1971 | Parwana | Rajeshwar Singh | |
| 1971 | Ganga Tera Pani Amrit | Dinesh | |
| 1971 | Nadaan | Ajay Jain | |
| 1971 | Sansar | Ajay | |
| 1971 | Buddha Mil Gaya | Ajay | |
| 1972 | Victoria No. 203 | Kumar | |
| 1973 | Tere Rang Nyare | | |
| 1973 | Dhund | Prakash/Chandrashekhar | |
| 1973 | Hanste Zakhm | Somesh | |
| 1973 | Dharma | Suraj/Raju | |
| 1973 | Chhalia | Shankar | |
| 1973 | Barkha Bahar | | |
| 1974 | Woh Main Nahin | Vijay/Salim/Diwakar/Daji Shashtri/Ashok/ Baba Radheshyam | |
| 1974 | Paise Ki Gudiya | Vijay | |
| 1974 | Nirmaan | Navin | |
| 1975 | Zorro | Rajkumar Gunawar Bahadur Singh/Zorro | |
| 1975 | Mounto | | |
| 1975 | Mere Sajna | Ratan | |
| 1976 | Ek Se Badhkar Ek | A.C.P. Rajesh Verma | |
| 1976 | Sawa Lakh Se Ek Ladaun | Jamal Din | |
| 1977 | Aafat | Inspector Amar | |
| 1977 | Kulvadhu | Anil | |
| 1978 | Giddha | Special Appearance | |
| 1978 | Tumhari Kassam | Sunil Verma | |
| 1979 | Do Ladke Dono Kadke | Lekhraj Malhotra | |
| 1979 | Prem Jaal | Villain | |
| 1979 | Lakhan | | |
| 1979 | Jaandaar | | |
| 1980 | Kashish | Ramesh | |
| 1980 | Saboot | Anand | |
| 1980 | The Burning Train | Doctor | |
| 1980 | Ek Baar Kaho | Ravi Varma | |
| 1980 | Khanjar | Prakash | |
| 1980 | Desh Drohee | | |
| 1981 | Dahshat | Dr. Sameer | |
| 1981 | Hotel | Suraj | |
| 1981 | Khara Khota | | |
| 1981 | Kaaran | Inspector Gill | Uncredited |
| 1981 | Doosra Roop | | |
| 1981 | Tadap | | |
| 1982 | Desh Premee | Inspector Deepak Singh | |
| 1982 | Anokha Bandhan | Shyamlal | |
| 1982 | Shiv Charan | Shiv | |
| 1982 | Log Kya Kahenge | | |
| 1982 | Dil Hi Dil Mein | Ashok Sahni | |
| 1983 | Zakhmi Dil | Special Appearance | |
| 1983 | Aasra Pyaar Da | Madan Lal | |
| 1984 | Do Yaaron Ki Yaari | | |
| 1984 | Kunwari Bahu | | |
| 1984 | Teri Baahon Mein | | |
| 1984 | Jawaani | Amarnath | |
| 1985 | Babu | Shankarlal | |
| 1985 | Lover Boy | Prakash | |
| 1985 | Sautela Pati | R. L. Malhotra | |
| 1986 | Gunehgaar | | |
| 1986 | Samundar | Surajbhan | |
| 1987 | 7 Saal Baad | Dilip Mathur | |
| 1987 | Param Dharam | Thakur Prem Singh | |
| 1987 | Mard Ki Zabaan | Ram Chauhan | |
| 1988 | Maar Dhaad | | |
| 1988 | Sone Pe Suhaaga | Constable Vishwanath | |
| 1988 | Mera Shikar | | |
| 1989 | Ajeeb Ittefaq | | |
| 1989 | Desh Ke Dushman | Inspector Suraj Gupta | |
| 1989 | Teri Payal Mere Geet | Thakur of Rajgarh | |
| 1989 | Phir Lehraya Lal Dupatta | | |
| 1990 | Bahaar Aane Tak | Mahendra Pratap | |
| 1990 | Muqaddar Ka Badshaah | DSP Rathod | |
| 1991 | Naya Zaher | | |
| 1991 | Swarg Jaisaa Ghar | | |
| 1991 | Jeevan Daata | C.B.I. Officer Vijay Sharma | |
| 1991 | Numbri Aadmi | I.G.P. | |
| 1992 | Zulm Ki Hukumat | Father-in-law | |
| 1992 | Raju Ban Gaya Gentleman | Lalkishan Chhabria | |
| 1993 | Bhookamp | | |
| 1993 | Dil Ki Baazi | Vishwanath Kashyap | |
| 1993 | Santaan | Mr. Saxena | |
| 1993 | Aashik Awara | Dilip Singh | |
| 1994 | Sangam Ho Ke Rahega | | |
| 1994 | Brahma | Shivprasad | |
| 1994 | Yuhi Kabhi | Pooja's Father | |
| 1994 | Udhaar Ki Zindagi | | |
| 1994 | Deewana Sanam | | |
| 1995 | Param Vir Chakra | | |
| 1995 | Guddu | Dr. Gupta | |
| 1996 | Himmat | Chief of Secret Service | |
| 1997 | Aastha | Mr. Dutt | |
| 1997 | Lahoo Ke Do Rang | DCP A. A. Khan | |
| 1997 | Prithvi | Rashmi's Father | |
| 1997 | Aastha: In the Prison of Spring | Mr. Dutt | |
| 1998 | Ek Tha Dil Ek Thi Dhadkhan | | |
| 1998 | Aakrosh | Dr. Malhotra | |
| 1998 | Major Saab | Brigadier Satish Khurana | |
| 1999 | Sar Ankhon Par | Cameo | |
| 1999 | Aa Ab Laut Chalen | Ashwin | |
| 1999 | Mahaul Theek Hai | IGP | |
| 1999 | Manchala | | |
| 1999 | Hindustan Ki Kasam | Chander Malhotra | |
| 2000 | Glamour Girl | Police Commissioner | |
| 2000 | Khauff | Judge | |
| 2000 | Khooni Shikanja | | |
| 2000 | Jung | Police Commissioner | |
| 2000 | Karobaar: The Business of Love | Rajesh Puri-Public Prosecutor | |
| 2001 | Rehnaa Hai Terre Dil Mein | Mr. Malhotra | |
| 2001 | Abhay | Tejaswini's Father | |
| 2002 | Pyaar Diwana Hota Hai | Mr. Khurana | |
| 2002 | Hum Kisise Kum Naheen | Dr. D. D. | |
| 2002 | Yeh Hai Jalwa | Surgeon | |
| 2003 | Pyaar Kiya Nahin Jaatha | Shekhar Pillai | |
| 2003 | Khushi | Mr. Roy | |
| 2003 | Out of Control | Richa's Father | |
| 2003 | Bollywood Calling | Manu Kapoor | |
| 2003 | Maa Santoshi Maa | | |
| 2004 | Mitter Pyare Nu Haal Mureedan Da Kehna | Singing Fakir | |
| 2004 | Mein Bikaaoo: On Sale | | |
| 2004 | Hatya | Ratan Lal | |
| 2005 | Aashiq Banaya Aapne | Mahesh Pariyar, Sneha's father | |
| 2005 | Classic Dance of Love | J. K. Malhotra | |
| 2006 | Khosla Ka Ghosla | Bapu/Sethi | |
| 2009 | Purab Ki Laila Paschim Ka Chaila | | |
| 2010 | Break Ke Baad | Jeet Gulati | Last appearance |

== Television ==
- Dekh Bhai Dekh (1993)
- Aahat (1995) (season 1) (1995-2001): Episode 62/63 - "The Noose"
- Farman
- Aashirwad (1998-2001)
- Choodiyan (2000)
- Kehta Hai Dil (2001-2002)
