= Bachke Rehna Re Baba =

- Theatrical release poster
- Directed by: Govind Menon
- Written by: Robin Bhatt
- Produced by: Vijay Galani; Rahul Sughand
- Starring: Rekha; Paresh Rawal; Mallika Sherawat; Satish Shah
- Cinematography: Thomas A. Xavier
- Edited by: Bunty Nagi; Prashant Rathore
- Music by: Songs: Anu Malik; Background Score: Surinder Sodhi
- Production companies: Sahara One Motion Pictures; BSK Network & Entertainment
- Distributed by: Eros International
- Release date: 17 June 2005
- Running time: 130 minutes
- Language: Hindi
- Budget: ₹6 crore
- Box office: ₹5.51 crore

Bachke Rehna Re Baba (lit. 'You have to watch out') is a 2005 Bollywood adult comedy film directed by Govind Menon, starring Rekha, Paresh Rawal, Mallika Sherawat and Satish Shah.

== Plot ==
Rukmini is well into her 40s and still unmarried. She lives with her orphaned niece, Padmini, and together they devise a scheme to entrap wealthy men, like Monty, relieve them of their money, abandon them, and move on to better targets. They do succeed for quite a while, assuming various disguises, and names, amassing a fortune, until Padmini falls in love with one of her targets, a young man named Raghu, and decides to call it quits. An unstable Rukmini, who owes money to Monty, decides she cannot go it alone and concocts a scheme that will force Padmini to give up on Raghu and re-join forces with her to go on plundering unsuspecting wealthy men.

== Cast ==
- Rekha - Rukmini/Richa/Gulpreet
- Paresh Rawal - Monty Bagga
- Mallika Sherawat - Padmini a.k.a. Paddu/Alka/Meera
- Satish Shah - Mulchand/Fakirchand Mansukhani
- Karan Khanna - Raghu
- Kurush Deboo - Wealthy doctor
- Suresh Menon
- Geeta Khanna as Shashikala
- Arun Ranjankar
- Manish Kumar
- Umesh Shukla

== Music ==
The music album of the film is composed by Anu Malik with lyrics written by Sayeed Quadri, Farhad Wadia, Anu Malik, Dev Kohli. Album has 8 Songs included remixes.

No.	Title	Lyrics	Singer(s)	Length
1.	"Bachke Rehna Re"	Dev Kohlil	Sunidhi Chauhan, Sowmya Raoh	6:20
2.	"Dil Churane Wale" (Male)	Dev Kohli	Kumar Sanu, Alka Yagnik	6:23
3.	"Tera Husn Woh Nasha Hai"	Sayeed Quadri	Kunal Ganjawala	6:24
4.	"Sharafat Chhod De"	Farhad Wadia	Alisha Chinoy	5:04
5.	"Eiffel Tower"	Anu Malik	Sunidhi Chauhan	3:19
6.	"Eiffel Tower" (Version 2)	Anu Malik	Rekha	3:20
7.	"Bachke Rehna Re" (Remix)	Dev Kohli	Sunidhi Chauhan, Sowmya Raoh	6:14
8.	"Sharafat Chhod De" (Remix)	Farhad Wadia	Alisha Chinoy	5:51
9.	"Bachke Rehna Re Baba" (Instrumental)		Anu Malik	5:43
10.	"Tera Husn" (Instrumental)		Anu Malik	6:26
