= Ek Hi Bhool =

- Theatrical release poster
- Directed by: T. Rama Rao
- Written by: Dr. Rahi Masoom Reza (dialogues)
- Screenplay by: K. Bhagyaraj
- Story by: K. Bhagyaraj
- Based on: Mouna Geethangal by K. Bhagyaraj
- Produced by: A. Purnachandra Rao
- Starring: Jeetendra; Rekha
- Cinematography: P.N.Sundaram
- Edited by: J. Krishnaswamy; V. Balasubramaniam
- Music by: Laxmikant–Pyarelal
- Production company: Lakshmi Productions
- Release date: 9 October 1981
- Running time: 145 minutes
- Country: India
- Language: Hindi

Ek Hi Bhool (transl. Just One Mistake) is a 1981 Indian Hindi-language drama film, produced by A. Purnachandra Rao under the Lakshmi Productions banner and directed by T. Rama Rao. The film stars Jeetendra and Rekha, with music composed by Laxmikant–Pyarelal. It is a remake of the Tamil film Mouna Geethangal (1981). The film was a box office success.

== Plot ==
Ram Kumar Shrivastava and Sadhana work in the same firm. Sadhana quits her job and becomes a home maker after they get married and lead a happy married life until Sadhana introduces Ram to her widowed friend Urvashi. Ram ends up having sex with Urvashi and then out of remorse, confesses this to Sadhana. Sadhana divorces Ram despite being pregnant at the time.

They meet 5 years later - when they end up working in the same firm and living in the same neighbourhood. Ram befriends his son Raju but Sadhana continues to harbour resentment towards Ram. Teg Bahadur, one of Sadhana 's colleagues is out to take revenge on Sadhana for humiliating him at work and spreads nasty rumours. Everyone in the firm believes the rumours except Ram. How Raju manages to reunite his parents forms the rest of the story.

== Cast ==
- Jeetendra as Ram
- Rekha as Sadhana
- Shabana Azmi as Meenakshi (Special appearance)
- Nazneen as Urvashi
- Mazhar Khan as Teg Bahadur
- Asrani as Manohar Prasad
- Agha as Kiran, Sadhana's dad
- Yunus Parvez as Lallulal
- Dinesh Hingoo as Laal Singh
- Jagdish Raj as Sharma, Ram's firm boss

== Soundtrack ==
Song	Singer
"Bekhudi Ka Bada"	S. P. Balasubrahmanyam
"Hey Raju, Hey Daddy, Hey Raju, Hey Daddy"	S. P. Balasubrahmanyam, Rajeshwari
"Hum Tumse Pyar Na Karte To Tum"	S. P. Balasubrahmanyam, Asha Bhosle
"Sard Sard Raaton Mein Thamke Dil"	S. P. Balasubrahmanyam, Asha Bhosle
"Bhari Jawani Mein"	Asha Bhosle
