= Do Shikaari =

- Directed by: Kuljit Pal
- Starring: Biswajeet; Vinod Khanna; Rekha; Amjad Khan
- Release date: 1979
- Country: India
- Language: Hindi

Do Shikaari (Two Hunters) is a 1979 Bollywood film starring Rekha, Biswajeet, Vinod Khanna and Amjad Khan. Originally titled Anjana Safar, the film was intended as Rekha's debut, but was delayed for nearly a decade by the Censor Board. The film was directed by Raja Nawathe, with songs composed by Chitragupt.

In Rekha: The Untold Story, actor Biswajeet is quoted saying that he was instructed by the director to kiss 15-year-old Rekha without warning so that they could film her genuine expression of surprise. Rekha herself was reportedly furious. When it was finally released, Do Shikaari performed poorly at the box office, despite the fact that its cast had become famous in the interim.

== Cast ==
- Biswajeet as Ranjeet
- Rekha as Sunita
- Vinod Khanna as Satish
- Amjad Khan as Zorro
- Joginder as Joginder
- Alka as Sherry
- Padma Khanna as Dancer

== Plot ==
Seeking the treasure located in Solomon's Mines in the heart of Africa, Zorro (Amjad Khan) abducts and holds Sunita's (Rekha) father as ransom, and forces her to journey to Africa, to find the treasure. She does travel to Africa, and meets with Ranjeet (Biswajeet) and asks him for help to locate her missing brother. Ranjeet agrees to do so, and they commence their travel, little knowing what awaits them in the deep jungle full of wild beasts; hostile tribesmen; a seemingly endless and barren desert; not to speak of treachery and greed of people from their own group.

== Soundtrack ==
All songs were composed by Chitragupt.

- "Chand Kyo Jard Hai" – Lata Mangeshkar
- "Zindagi Ae Zindagi, Humse Mat Kar Dillagi" – Deedar Singh Pardesi
- "Aa Ja Gori Dil Mein Rakh Len Tujhe" – Kishore Kumar
- "Ae Dil Meri Jaan Teri Manzil Hai Kahan" – Deedar Singh Pardesi
- "Bahar Bitne Wali Hai" – Deedar Singh Pardesi
- "Honth Ye Mere Aag Se Nahi Kam" – Asha Bhosle
- "Pagal Hawa Raate Diwani" – Asha Bhosle
