= Yatra (2006 film) =

- Theatrical release poster
- Directed by: Goutam Ghose
- Written by: Nida Fazli; Goutam Ghose
- Produced by: Bipin Kumar Vohra
- Starring: Rekha; Nana Patekar; Deepti Naval
- Cinematography: Goutam Ghose
- Edited by: Goutam Ghose
- Music by: Khayyam; Goutam Ghose
- Release dates: 2006 (Montréal World Film Festival); 4 May 2007 (India)
- Running time: 129 minutes
- Country: India
- Language: Hindi

Yatra (Devanagari: यात्रा, lit. 'Journey') is a 2006 Indian Hindi-language drama film directed by Goutam Ghose. It stars Rekha, Nana Patekar, and Deepti Naval in lead roles.

The film premiered at the 2006 Montréal World Film Festival.

== Plot ==
Dasrath Joglekar (Nana Patekar), a celebrated writer, travels to New Delhi to receive the prestigious 'Sahitya Sanmaan' Literary Award. During the journey, he meets a young filmmaker, Mohan (Nakul Vaid), an ardent fan of Dasrath's writing, and the encounter brings back memories from the past. Both of them travel back in time, remembering characters from Dasrath's celebrated novel 'Janaaza', reconstructing the true story of the novel's protagonist, Laajvanti (Rekha), from their perspective. Fact and fiction merge to create a new journey.

After the gala award ceremony in New Delhi, Dasarath begins another journey in his new novel 'Bazaar', while the nostalgia of the previous one haunts him. Dasarath disappears from his hotel in New Delhi. Tension mounts in his family and associates regarding his whereabouts.

Memories from the past and passion bring him to Mehendi Galli near Char Minar in Hyderabad, where people flock to enjoy mujra dances. The entire area has changed. Laajvanti, alias Laajobai, has become Miss Lisa, presenting popular film song numbers to entertain a new clientele. Dasarath's sudden appearance is a great surprise for Laajvanti. The character of his novel Janaaza comes alive at an unexpected juncture.

Laajvanti shows her reverence for Dasrath by singing melodies from their past. Fate accomplices another journey into the unknown. Is this fact or is it fiction, created by filmmaker Mohan for his forthcoming film called Janaaza?

== Cast ==
- Rekha as Lajwanti
- Nana Patekar as Dasrath Joglekar
- Deepti Naval as Smita Joglekar
- Romit Raj as Yaman Joglekar
- Anandi Ghosh as Sohini Joglekar
- Jeeva as Zamindar Pulla Reddy
- Nakul Vaid as Mohan
- Masood Akhtar as Salim
- Bharati Devi as Dasrath's Mother

== Music ==
1. "Aap Toh Mere Hi Khwaabon Mein Sada Aaya Kare" - Udit Narayan, Alka Yagnik Music: Khayyam
2. "Madhur Madhur Door Koyee Baansuri Bajaaye" - Asha Bhosle Music: Khayyam
3. "Mori Ankhiyaan Dhoond Rahi" - Subhra Guha Music: Goutam Ghose
4. "Naghma E Jaan, Saaz E Dil " -Talat Aziz Music: Khayyam
5. "Kabhi Aar Kabhi Paar" (Remix) - Jojo Music arranged by: Goutam Ghose
6. "Kabhi Aar Kabhi Paar" - Jojo Music arranged by: Goutam Ghose
7. "Jaam E Mohabbat Aankhon Se Hi" - Asha Bhosle Music: Khayyam
8. "Biya Biya" - Ustad Rashid Ali Khan Music: Goutam Ghose
9. "Dareja Dareja" - Subhra Guha Music: Goutam Ghose
10. "Garje Ghata" - Ustad Rashid Ali Khan Music: Goutam Ghose
11. "Jaao Ji Karo Na Jhoothi Batiyaan" - Subhra Guha Music: Goutam Ghose
12. "Tadpe Bin Baalam" - Subhra Guha Music: Goutam Ghose
13. "Panchchee Pinjare Se Ud Jaavega" - Keya Acharya Music: Goutam Ghose
  Lyrics
  Sanjeev Tiwari
  Panchchee Pinjare Se Ud Jaavega

== Production ==
In January 2006, Stardust reported that Rekha and Nana Patekar were cast to play the lead roles in the film. Director Goutam Ghose said of the film: "There are autobiographical elements in the film, like my journey as a filmmaker, what I've absorbed from around myself along the way and I've used them to tell this story."

== Reception ==
The film was received well by The Times of India, Hindustan Times, and The Indian Express, but panned by Rediff.com.

== Awards ==
54th National Film Awards

- National Film Award for Best Cinematography - Goutam Ghose
