= Sawan Bhadon =

1970 Indian film by Mohan Segal

- Poster
- Directed by: Mohan Segal
- Written by: Ali Raza
- Produced by: Mohan Segal
- Starring: Navin Nischol; Rekha; Jayshree T. Sushama Shiromanee
- Cinematography: Baldev Singh
- Edited by: Pratap Dave
- Music by: Sonik Omi
- Release date: 1970
- Country: India
- Language: Hindi

Sawan Bhadon is a 1970 Indian Hindi-language film produced and directed by Mohan Segal. The film was the debut film for its lead pair Navin Nischol and Rekha. The other cast of note in the film are Jayshree T., Iftekhar and Ranjeet. The music is by Sonik Omi. This was also Ranjeet's debut film.

== Plot ==
Vikram is a man from a wealthy family living in Europe. He has a step-sister Dolly and step-mother Sulochana, who are very cunning and greedy and steal Vikram's money during his absence from India. Vikram decides to come back to India, which interferes with the plans of Sulochana and her allies. Vikram, being naive, trusts Sulochana and Dolly and treats them as their family, but Sulochana pretends to be affectionate to him, as he is the only heir to all the family property and money.

Vikram, on his way home, is blocked by some thugs, who are actually the men hired by Sulochana's brother to kill him. But a village girl Chanda and her friends help him and drive away the thugs. Vikram is attracted to her and her fun-loving nature. Both of them fall in love with each other and plan to marry with Chanda's family's consent. But Sulochana is against the marriage and tries to force Vikram to leave her, but Vikram does not obey her. Dolly meets a man named Madan, who introduces himself as a person who makes talented girls into stars through his cultural centre. Dolly, being a dancer wants to be a star and is also attracted towards him. She introduces Madan to her mother who also encourages this relationship. Vikram discovers that Madan is actually a cunning crook who sells girls to foreign countries. He stops Dolly from meeting Madan, but Dolly and Sulochana are against him and Sulochana declares that Dolly will marry Madan, at any cost. Vikram learns that behind his back, Sulochana has fraudulently acquired properties of the villagers and he decides to return them to their rightful owners.

Sulochana decides to kill him with the help of Madan by planting a bomb in his car, before he heads towards Bangalore. The car explodes as per her plan and everyone including Chanda believes that Vikram is dead. All enemies of Vikram celebrate his death happily until they see Vikram coming back alive. Sulochana believes Vikram is dead for sure and the man is not Vikram. She tries to prove by all means that he is not Vikram. But Vikram proves that he has escaped merely with some injuries. He brings Chanda and her mother to look after Sulochana and prevent her from running away with the wealth. Sulochana decides to kill the Vikram look-alike by poisoning his milk. She sees him drinking the poisoned milk and lying dead. She takes him to bury, but discovers he has not died as the milk was not actually poisoned. She screams that he cannot be Vikram as she killed him with her own hands.

She confesses that she saw him falling out and burning from the exploded car and had bashed his head. The Vikram look-alike then admits that he is not Vikram, but CID Inspector Vinod. Sulochana realizes the enormity of her confession and commits suicide. Chanda is very disappointed about Vinod acting as Vikram, but Vinod tells her Vikram is not dead really, but survived with injuries, as he was thrown out of his car by a car thief on the way and only the robber was killed by Sulochana. To arrest her and Vikram's enemies, Vinod, who incidentally resembled Vikram, posed like him to catch them red-handed. Chanda meets Vikram in hospital and is happy that he is alive. Dolly who has realised her mistake and is quite repentant also unites with her brother. Vinod leaves as his work is done.

== Cast ==
- Navin Nischol as Vikram / CID Inspector Vinod
- Rekha as Chanda
- Jayshree T. as Dolly
- Narendranath as Madan Gopal
- Iftekhar as Gauri Shankar
- Shyama as Sulochana
- Krishan Dhawan as Darbarilal
- Ranjeet as Damu
- Agha as Qasim Jani
- Chandrima Bhaduri as Kalyani
- Rajan Kapoor as CID officer 1
- Bhushan Tiwari as CID officer 2
- Ravikant as CID officer 3
- Madan Puri as robber who robs Vikram
- Sushama Shiromanee as Chanda's friend, the child's mother
- Pardesi as Waiter
- Mamaji as servant at Sulochana Devi's house

== Songs ==
Song	Singer
"Kaan Mein Jhumka, Taal Mein Thumka"	Mohammed Rafi
"Sun Sun Sun, O Gulabi Kali, Teri Meri Baat Ab Aage Chali"	Asha Bhosle, Mohammed Rafi
"Ek Dard Utha, Haay Ek Dard Utha"	Asha Bhosle, Usha Khanna
"Aankhen Meri Maikhana"	Asha Bhosle
"Ae Najarbaaz Saiyan"	Asha Bhosle
"Mera Man Ghabraye"	Asha Bhosle
"Akhiyan Na Maar"	Asha Bhosle
