= Ghar (1978 film) =

1978 Indian Hindi-language film

Ghar (1978)
- Poster
- Directed by: Manik Chatterjee
- Written by: Dinesh Thakur
- Produced by: N. N. Sippy
- Starring: Vinod Mehra; Rekha
- Cinematography: Nando Bhattacharya
- Edited by: Waman Bhonsle; Gurudutt Shirali
- Music by: R. D. Burman
- Distributed by: N. N. Sippy Productions; Eros Entertainment
- Release date: 9 February 1978
- Country: India
- Language: Hindi

Ghar (transl. Home) is an Indian Hindi-language film directed by Manik Chatterjee, released in 1978. It stars Vinod Mehra, Rekha in lead roles. The music was composed by R. D. Burman and is considered one of his finest creations.

== Plot ==
Vikas Chandra and Aarti have recently married and moved into their new apartment. One evening, they go out to watch a late-night Hindi film at a local cinema. The movie ends well after midnight, and as no cab can be found at that hour, they decide to walk home. On the way, they are suddenly waylaid by four men, who assault Vikas, leaving him unconscious, and forcibly take Aarti with them. When Vikas regains consciousness, he finds himself in hospital with a head wound. He is informed that Aarti is in the same hospital, having been gang-raped and assaulted. This incident makes headlines in the media and becomes a topic of discussion among politicians during their election campaign. Vikas feels haunted by the incident and does not know how to proceed. Aarti, on the other hand, has been completely traumatised and is unable to trust any male. The couple now faces a serious crisis that leads to a loveless relationship, and only a miracle can restore the old spark in their married life.

== Cast ==
- Vinod Mehra as Vikas Chandra
- Rekha as Aarti Chandra
- Prema Narayan as Seema
- Asit Sen as Mr. Chatterjee
- Dinesh Thakur as Dr. Prashant
- Asrani as Inspector Kumthekar
- Madan Puri as Vikas' Father
- Shashi Kiran as Dilip
- Master Alankar as Raghu
- C.S.Dubey as Banwarilal
- Viju Khote as Havaldar
- Major Anand
- Tarla Mehta
- Akbar Bakshi
- Yasmin
- Madan Kumar

== Accolades ==
Year	Award	Category	Nominee(s)	Result
1979	Filmfare Awards	Best Actress	Rekha	Nominated
1979	Filmfare Awards	Best Story	Dinesh Thakur	Won

== Music ==
The soundtrack of the film contains 5 songs. The music is composed by R. D. Burman, with lyrics by Gulzar. "Phir Wahi Raat Hai" is considered to be one of the most loved filmi songs of all time.

Song	Singer
"Phir Wahi Raat Hai"	Kishore Kumar
"Aap Ki Aankhon Mein Kuch Mehke Hue Se Raaz Hai"	Kishore Kumar, Lata Mangeshkar
"Tere Bina Jiya Jaye Na"	Lata Mangeshkar, Kishore Kumar
"Aaj Kal Paon Zameen Par"	Lata Mangeshkar
"Botal Se Ek Baat Chali Hai, Kaag Udake Raat Chali Hai"	Mohammed Rafi, Asha Bhosle
