= Inti Guttu (1958 film) =

- Theatrical release poster
- Directed by: Vedantam Raghavayya
- Screenplay by: Vedantam Raghavayya
- Story by: Vempati Sadasivabrahmam
- Produced by: Akella Sastry
- Starring: N. T. Rama Rao; Savitri
- Cinematography: C. Nageswara Rao
- Edited by: P. V. Narayana
- Music by: M. S. Prakash
- Production company: Sangeetha Films
- Release date: 7 November 1958
- Running time: 140 minutes
- Country: India
- Language: Telugu

Inti Guttu (transl. Family Secret) is a 1958 Indian Telugu-language drama film, produced by Akella Sastry and directed by Vedantam Raghavayya. It stars N. T. Rama Rao, Savitri with music composed by M. S. Prakash. It is a partly based on the Hindi film Munimji (1955).

== Cast ==
- N. T. Rama Rao as Gopal
- Savitri as Sobha
- Gummadi as Tirumala Rao
- Relangi as Bhadrachalam
- R. Nageswara Rao as Prabhakaram
- K. V. S. Sarma as Swamiji
- Mahankali Venkaiah as Seshachalam
- Jagga Rao
- Suryakantham as Nancharamma
- Rajasulochana as Rita
- Pushpavalli as Mahalakshmamma

== Production ==
Inti Guttu is a remake of the Hindi film Munimji (1955), but differs in many respects: the hero disguises himself as an aged driver, unlike the original where he disguises as an accountant. An original creation to Inti Guttu was the patriarch's sister, who was not present in the Hindi version. In Munimji, the woman whom the patriarch secretly married swaps her newly born son with his deceased wife's child, but in Inti Guttu, the sister's husband interchanges the children.

== Soundtrack ==
Inti Guttu

Film score by M. S. Prakash
- Released: 1958
- Genre: Soundtrack
- Length: 40:38
- Producer: M. S. Prakash

Music composed by M. S. Prakash. Lyrics were written by Malladi Ramakrishna Sastry.

S. No.	Song title	Singers	length
1	"Maa Chinni Papayi"	P. Leela	3:26
2	"Nyayam Idena"	Ghantasala	3:16
3	"Balu Vannela Chinnela"	Jikki	3:21
4	"Mandu Kaani Mandu"	Pithapuram	2:55
5	"Aaduvari Matalaku"	A. M. Rajah	2:49
6	"Raaju Neevoy"	Jikki	3:21
7	"Chakkani Vaada"	Jikki	1:46
8	"Nee Leela Lanni"	Jikki	3:12
9	"Manasaina Vaada"	Pithapuram, Jikki	3:30
10	"Oho Varala Bala"	Ghantasala, P. Leela	3:30
11	"Saranu Saranu"	P. Leela	3:20
12	"Brathuku Nee Kosame"	Jikki	3:11
13	"Arachethilo"	P. B. Srinivas	3:01
