= Jeevan Dhaara =

- Directed by: T. Rama Rao
- Screenplay by: Dr. Rahi Masoom Reza
- Story by: K. Balachander
- Based on: Aval Oru Thodar Kathai (Tamil)
- Produced by: A. V. Subba Rao
- Starring: Rekha; Raj Babbar; Rakesh Roshan; Amol Palekar; Simple Kapadia; Kanwaljit Singh
- Edited by: Bhaskar
- Music by: Laxmikant–Pyarelal
- Release date: 19 February 1982
- Country: India
- Language: Hindi

Jeevan Dhaara is a 1982 Indian Hindi-language film directed by T. Rama Rao. The film is a remake of the 1974 Tamil film Aval Oru Thodar Kathai. The film stars Rekha in the pivotal role along with Raj Babbar, Rakesh Roshan, Amol Palekar, Kanwaljit Singh and Simple Kapadia. The movie bridges the mainstream genre with Parallel Cinema. Rekha received a nomination for Filmfare Best Actress Award, the only nomination for the film and is credited with the film's box office success.

== Plot ==
Sangeeta (Rekha) is a young, strong and idealistic girl in her late twenties who unlike her contemporaries, is still not married as she has to take care of a large family. Her father has abandoned their family in the guise of sans; her mother is a homemaker; her alcoholic brother (Raj Babbar) is unemployed despite being married and the father of three children; one younger sister Geeta (Madhu Kapoor) is widowed; Sangeeta has another younger sister and a younger brother who are studying. All members of this family live under one roof with Sangeeta as the only earning member.

Secretly, Sangeeta dreams of the day when she will have her own husband and children. Prem (Kanwaljit) is her longstanding friend and is in love with her. She realizes her feelings for him after she is unable to find him on the bus one day. They start dating and she brings him home to meet her family but her widowed sister falls in love with Prem as well. When Sangeeta finds out about this she asks Prem to forget her and marry her sister instead and he accepts.

After some unfortunate incidents, involving her brother and her best friend (Simple Kapadia) Sangeeta's boss (Rakesh Roshan) offers Sangeeta's brother a job in his company and proposes to Sangeeta. However, on the day of the wedding Sangeeta's brother is killed by a goon he owed money to and Sangeeta must break off the wedding so she can continue to support her family. The film ends with Sangeeta telling the bus conductor that a woman who has a mother, a widowed sister-in-law, two siblings and three young children to take care of, cannot dream for her individual self.

== Cast ==
- Rekha as Sangeeta Srivastav
- Rakesh Roshan as Kanwal
- Amol Palekar as Anand Bhatnagar
- Raj Babbar as Ashok Kumar Srivastav
- Kanwaljit Singh as Prem
- Simple Kapadia as Kalpana Malhotra
- Sulochana Latkar as Parvati Srivastav
- Madhu Kapoor as Geeta Srivastav
- Suresh Chatwal as Roop Kumar

== Music ==
The song Jaldi Se Aa Mere Pardesi Babul marked the first collaboration of Anuradha Paudwal, Kavita Krishnamurthy and Alka Yagnik.

Song	Singer
Gangaram Kanwara	Kishore Kumar
Jeevan Dhaara	S. P. Balasubrahmanyam
Samay Ke Darpan	Suresh Wadkar, Asha Bhosle
Jaldi aa mere pardesi babu jaldi se aa na der laga	Anuradha Paudwal, Alka Yagnik, Kavita Krishnamurthy
Paida Karke	Salim Premragi
