= Khubsoorat =

1980 Indian film by Hrishikesh Mukherjee

- Film poster
- Directed by: Hrishikesh Mukherjee
- Screenplay by: Shanu Banerjee; Ashok Rawat; Gulzar
- Story by: D. N. Mukherjee
- Produced by: Hrishikesh Mukherjee; N. C. Sippy
- Starring: Ashok Kumar; Rekha; Rakesh Roshan; Dina Pathak
- Cinematography: Jaywant Pathare
- Edited by: Subhash Gupta
- Music by: R. D. Burman
- Release date: 25 January 1980
- Country: India
- Language: Hindi

Khubsoorat (transl. Beautiful) is a 1980 Indian Hindi-language comedy drama film, directed and produced by Hrishikesh Mukherjee, and written by Gulzar, Shanu Banerjee, Ashok Rawat, and D. N. Mukherjee. The film stars Ashok Kumar, Rekha, Rakesh Roshan and Dina Pathak. It was a box-office success. The film was remade in Telugu as Swargam in 1981, in Tamil as Lakshmi Vandhachu, and in Malayalam as Vannu Kandu Keezhadakki. The 2014 film of the same name was loosely based on it. The 2023 film Rocky Aur Rani Kii Prem Kahani directed by Karan Johar also drew heavily from it.

Hrishikesh Mukherjee won the 1981 Filmfare Award for Best Film. Rekha won the Filmfare Award for Best Actress for her role as Manju Dayal. Dina Pathak received a nomination for the Filmfare Award for Best Supporting Actress for her role as Nirmala Gupta.

== Plot ==
In Pune, middle-aged Nirmala Gupta, wife of Dwaraka Prasad Gupta and mother of Dr. Inder Gupta, is a strict disciplinarian and runs her household by laws. Everyone in the house, including Inder and Dwaraka Prasad, follow her laws even though they do not approve of them. Soon, she fixes the marriage of her second son Chander Gupta with Anju Dayal, who is from Mumbai and is the daughter of the rich widower Ram Dayal and is the elder sister of Manju Dayal. After Chander and Anju's marriage, Manju comes to visit Anju for some months. Being a playful girl, she quickly gets the disapproval of Nirmala but Inder falls in love with her. Manju also befriends Dwaraka Prasad and gets the trust of everyone in the house except Nirmala. One day, over Inder, Dwaraka Prasad and other family members, Manju performs a small play highlighting the tyranny of Nirmala who was not believed to be at home at that time but she accidentally sees the play. She gets hurt as everyone thinks her a dictator even though she does good to the family members. Moreover, the fact that everyone did not feel free with her but felt free with Manju who is an outsider, hurts her more. The next day, except Manju, Nirmala and Dwaraka Prasad, Inder and other family members leave the house for some days for a wedding. Manju then apologises to Nirmala but she instead banishes her from her house. Seeing this, Dwaraka Prasad loses his temper and he confronts Nirmala which causes him to get a serious heart attack. Nirmala gets tensed but Manju acts timely and saves Dwaraka Prasad. At last, Nirmala understands Manju's character. However, when Inder and other family members return home, Manju leaves the house but Inder follows her to the railway station with Nirmala who stops her. In the end, Inder and Manju get married.

== Cast ==
- Ashok Kumar as Dwarka Prasad Gupta
- Dina Pathak as Nirmala Gupta
- David as Ram Dayal
- Rekha as Manju Dayal
- Rakesh Roshan as Dr. Indar Gupta
- Amarnath Mukhopadhyay as Sundar Gupta
- Shashikala as Bari Gupta
- Vijay Sharma as Chandar Gupta
- Aradhana Deshpande as Anju Dayal
- S. N. Banerjee as Umashankar
- Keshto Mukherjee as Ashrafi Lal
- Ranjit Chowdhry as Jagan Gupta
- Rupini as Munni
- Om Shivpuri as Dr. Gokhale
- Anand as Dr Abbas Iqbal, Indar's colleague
- Rita Rani Kaul as Farida, Abbas's wife (Guest appearance)

== Soundtrack ==
Lyrics by Gulzar.

Song	Singer	Raga
"Sun Sun Sun Didi"	Asha Bhosle	
"Sare Niyam Tod Do"	Asha Bhosle	
"Piya Bawri, Piya Bawri"	Asha Bhosle, Ashok Kumar	Bihag
"Sare Niyam Tod Do"	Usha, Kalyani	
"Kayda Kayda"	Sapan Chakraborty, Rekha	

== Accolades ==
28th Filmfare Awards

Won

- Best Film – Hrishikesh Mukherjee
- Best Actress – Rekha
- Best Comedian – Keshto Mukherjee

Nominated

- Best Director – Hrishikesh Mukherjee
- Best Supporting Actress – Dina Pathak
- Best Story – D. N. Mukherjee
