= Phool Bane Angaray =

- Poster
- Directed by: K.C. Bokadia
- Produced by: K. C. Bokadia
- Starring: Rekha; Rajinikanth; Prem Chopra
- Music by: Bappi Lahiri
- Release date: 12 July 1991
- Country: India
- Language: Hindi
- Budget: ₹2.15 crore
- Box office: ₹6 crore

Phool Bane Angaray (transl. Flowers become embers) is a 1991 Indian Hindi-language film directed by K.C. Bokadia and stars Rekha and Rajinikanth in the lead roles. The film is a remake of the Telugu film Bharatha Nari (1989) by Muthyala Subbaiah. The film did well commercially, and Rekha was praised for her performance.

== Plot ==
Dutta Babu is standing for elections in Udaipur, against a cunning, corrupt, & established gangster, Bishamber Prasad, who is also powerful and influential enough to swing the election his way, as well as have Dutta killed. Inspector Ranjit Singh gets evidence about Bishamber's involvement in Dutta's death, but his superior officer, Deputy Superintendent of Police Officer Ravi Khanna, prevents him from taking any action. Ranjit then meets with beautiful Namrata, and both get married. As Ranjit continues to be a thorn on Bishamber's side, he is killed, leaving behind a sorrowing Superintendent of Police Officer Namrata Singh. Namrata pledges to avenge his death. His courageous wife then joins the police force to avenge his death.

== Cast ==
- Rekha as Namrata Singh, School Teacher / SP
- Rajinikanth as Inspector Ranjit Singh
- Prem Chopra as Bishambar Prasad
- Charan Raj as Charanraj Prasad
- Shafi Inamdar as Murlidhar
- Beena Banerjee as Beena, Murlidhar Wife
- Parikshat Sahni as Dutta Babu
- Aparajita Bhushan as Sharda Devi Dutta
- Jagdish Raj as Commissioner Pandey
- Dalip Tahil as DSP Ravi Khanna
- Senthil as Muthuswamy, Bishambhar Prasad's Personal Secretary
- Bindu as Veena Singh
- Alok Nath as Major Rajan Singh
- Manjeet Kullar
- Sheeba Akashdeep Item Appearance Challe Baalon main
- Prem Kumar (unnamed role)

== Soundtrack ==
#	Title	Singer(s)
1	"Gori Kabse Hui Jawaan"	Lata Mangeshkar
2	"Jeena Agar Jaruri Hai To"	Amit Kumar
3	"Dil Tera Jaan Teri"	Alka Yagnik, Bappi Lahiri
4	"Naina Ho Gaye Baware"	Kavita Krishnamurthy, Sudesh Bhosle
5	"Phool Kabhi Jab"	Mohammed Aziz
6	Challe baalon main	Lata Mangeshkar

== Reception ==
N. Krishnaswamy of The Indian Express wrote that "Films made by men like K. C. Bokadia don't have the intelligent sections of society in mind".

== Bibliography ==
- Ramachandran, Naman (2014) [2012]. Rajinikanth: The Definitive Biography. Penguin Books. ISBN 978-81-8475-796-5.
