= Aastha: In the Prison of Spring =

Aastha: In the prison of Spring
- Film poster
- Directed by: Basu Bhattacharya
- Written by: Basu Bhattacharya
- Produced by: Basu Bhattacharya
- Starring: Rekha; Om Puri; Dinesh Thakur; Navin Nischol; Daisy Irani
- Cinematography: Khokon Bhaduri; Dilip Ranjan Mukhopadhyay (also director of photography)
- Edited by: Shailesh Shetye
- Music by: Shaarang Dev; Lyrics: Gulzar
- Distributed by: Aarohi Film Makers
- Release date: 28 January 1997
- Running time: 132 minutes
- Country: India
- Language: Hindi

Aastha: In the Prison of Spring is a 1997 Indian Hindi-language film, produced and directed by Basu Bhattacharya. The film stars Rekha, Om Puri, Navin Nischol and Daisy Irani in the main roles. The film went on to receive both critical acclaim and commercial success, the latter of which had eluded Basu in his last few films. Subsequently, spurred on by this success, Basu was even planning to remake the film in English, though he died in June 1997, at the age 62. The film's success was described as blurring the gap between Indian art and commercial cinema, where art film makers, dealing with serious issues, used a musical format to make the film more commercially appealing, thus reaching a wider audience. Rekha received a nomination of 1997 Star Screen Award for Best Actress.

In the movie, Rekha had the controversial role of a married woman who turns into a prostitute, which was severely criticized by the audience. About her role in the movie, Rekha said, "After 'Aastha: In the Prison of Spring' people had a lot to say about my role of a wife who moonlights as a prostitute. I don't have problems playing anything. I've reached a stage where I could do justice to any role that came my way. It could be role of a mother, a sister-in-law; negative, positive, sensational or anything."

The movie is remembered for its infamous explicit love scenes.

== Plot summary ==
Mansi and Amar have been married for years, and have a daughter by this marriage. Amar is employed full-time, while Mansi looks after the household chores and their daughter. Amar earns a steady income, which enables the family to live comfortably, but they cannot afford to be extravagant at all. One day while buying shoes for her daughter, Mansi realizes that shoes are really expensive, and wants to leave the store without purchasing them. Another woman customer named Reena offers to pay for the shoes, as she feels sorry for Mansi. Mansi reluctantly accepts Reena's offer to pay for the shoes, not realizing that Reena has paid for these shoes with a secret agenda that will open a new door in Mansi's life dragging her to prostitution to satisfy materialistic and sexual needs. The rest of the movie shows her trying to get out of this arrangement, until finally she uses help of one of Amar's students to inform him about the situation.

== Themes ==
The film was seen as follow up of the noted trilogy Basu Bhattacharya made around marital discord in the 1970s, with Anubhav (1971), Avishkaar (1973) and Griha Pravesh (1979). Aastha turned out to be Basu's last movie, and is set again in the institution of marriage, although here Basu illustrates his response to the growing materialism in the 1990s and explores its impact on modern, urban marriage, as well as moral values. A bored and restless housewife, who has a young school-going daughter, awakens to her sexuality post mid-life, and in the process falls into the trap of prostitution. She wants material comforts (consumerism) and finds her professor husband's (Om Puri) income inadequate for it. She agrees to have a liaison with another man (Navin Nischol), in exchange for gifts and money, in the absence of her husband, who is shown as being highly principled. Though later, she is unable to reconcile with the new reality, as guilt and remorse regarding her choices, soon overshadow the joys of her few found comforts and sexual escapades.

It remains one of few films in Bollywood, which explore a woman's sexuality outside marriage,

== Cast ==
Actor/Actress	Role
Rekha	Mansi
Om Puri	Amar
Dinesh Thakur	Dinesh
Anwesha Bhattacharya	Amita
Daisy Irani	Reena
Navin Nischol	Mr. Dutt
Shruti Patel	Neeti

== Soundtrack ==
The soundtrack is composed by Shaarang Dev with the lyrics penned by Gulzar.

No.	Title	Singers	Length
1.	"Jai Jai Naath"	K. Ravi Shankar
2.	"Labon Se Chumlo" (Raga Puriya Dhanashri)	Sriradha Banerjee
3.	"Recitation"	Gulzar
4.	"Tum Tanana Tere Na"	Sadhana Sargam, Vinod Rathod
5.	"Ye Raat Kunwari Hai"	Vinod Rathod
6.	"Tan Pe Lagti Kaanch Ki Boondein"	Sriradha Bannerjee
