= Lajja (film) =

2001 Indian film by Rajkumar Santoshi

- Film poster
- Directed by: Rajkumar Santoshi
- Written by: Ranjit Kapoor; Rajkumar Santoshi (Dialogues)
- Screenplay by: Ashok Rawat; Rajkumar Santoshi
- Story by: Rajkumar Santoshi; Ram (uncredited)
- Produced by: Rajkumar Santoshi
- Starring: Manisha Koirala; Madhuri Dixit; Rekha; Mahima Chaudhry; Anil Kapoor; Ajay Devgn; Jackie Shroff; Danny Denzongpa
- Narrated by: Bharat Shah
- Cinematography: Madhu Ambat
- Edited by: V. N. Mayekar
- Music by: Score: Ilaiyaraaja; Songs: Anu Malik; Ilaiyaraaja
- Production company: Santoshi Productions
- Distributed by: Eros International (Worldwide)
- Release date: 31 August 2001
- Running time: 202 minutes
- Country: India
- Language: Hindi
- Budget: ₹22 crore
- Box office: ₹34.29 crore

Lajja (transl. shame, modesty) is a 2001 Indian Hindi-language crime drama film produced and directed by Rajkumar Santoshi. Based on the plight of women and feminism in India, the film satirizes the honor with which women are placed in society and the restrictions imposed on them. The fact that the names of four women (Vaidehi, Janki, Ramdulari and Maithili) are all versions of Sita, the ideal Hindu woman's name, is a message in itself. It features Manisha Koirala, Madhuri Dixit, Rekha and Mahima Chaudhry in the lead roles, along with Anil Kapoor, Ajay Devgn, Jackie Shroff and Danny Dengzongpa.

Lajja failed commercially in India but was a major commercial success overseas. It received mixed reviews with criticism for story and screenplay, but the performances from the lead actors were highly praised.

At the 47th Filmfare Awards, Lajja was nominated for 3 awards – Best Supporting Actor (Devgn) and Best Supporting Actress (for both Rekha and Dixit). At the 2002 Zee Cine Awards, it won Best Supporting Actress (Dixit).

== Plot ==
Vaidehi is married to the rich Raghu in New York City. Outside, she lives a sophisticated life, but inside, Raghu is abusive and has extramarital affairs. Even his father doesn't care about his son's immoral behavior. Later, Vaidehi has enough and is banished from the household. She returns to her parents' house, but they reject her as Vaidehi running away from Raghu taints their family's reputation because her in-laws' home is a daughter's real home. She soon finds out she is pregnant.

Raghu gets into a car accident and is left impotent. Upon knowing Vaidehi's pregnancy, he calls her, faking remorse, and asks her to return. She agrees, thinking Raghu has mended his ways. In reality, he and his father plot for the baby to become their heir, and if Vaidehi intervenes, she will be killed. A friend informs Vaidehi of Raghu's true intentions, and she escapes from his henchmen.

Raju, a petty but kind-hearted thief, helps Vaidehi, hears her story, and gives her money so that she can go to Haripur. They gatecrash a wedding, where Vaidehi meets the bride, Maithili, a middle-class girl marrying her college sweetheart, a rich man. The groom's friend Gulshan attempts to drunkenly propose to Maithili but is stopped by Raju. She and Vaidehi witness the groom's father, Mr. Hazarilal, harassing Maithili's father, Nekchand, with demands for an opulent wedding, which is unaffordable, and forcing him to pay dowry, with his reputation in society being ruined if he fails. Vaidehi tries to convince Raju to give Nekchand his money from the heist. He refuses and is soon forced to escape as somebody has recognized him as a gatecrasher. Changing his mind after helping a prostitute, he returns to give his heist money to Vaidehi.

One of the guests, Gulabchand, recognizes the heist money which Raju had stolen from him before gatecrashing the wedding. Moreover, Gulshan tells the groom's family that he spotted Raju in Maithili's room. She is accused of having sexual relations with him in return for money, which leads Raju to acknowledge his theft publicly. Maithili stands up to and insults the groom's family, and they flee from the wedding. Raghu finds and forces Vaidehi to return home. On the way, they encounter a protest mob. Raghu gets out to investigate, thus giving Vaidehi a chance to escape.

Vaidehi arrives in a small town, Haripur, and meets Janki, a theatre actress in love with her colleague, Manish. She is pregnant but not married, and doesn't care for society's norms. The older theatre director, Purushottam, took in Janki when she was young and lusted after her, while keeping his younger wife, Lata, confined to their house. He badmouths Janki to Manish, creating a rift. Manish asks her to abort the child as he suspects it isn't his, indirectly accusing Janki of sexual relations with Purushottam. Outraged, Janki intentionally botches a scene during a performance of the Ramayan, resulting in a public outcry that gets her threatened with prison or the asylum. The angered audience assaults her on her way to the asylum, causing her to miscarry. Vaidehi confronts Purshottam, who threatens to call Raghu. Lata intervenes and puts her on a train at the railway station.

Vaidehi's train is robbed by bandits, but Bhulwa, a kind-hearted local dacoit, saves the passengers. Vaidehi faints at the sight of blood. Bhulwa takes her to the local midwife, Ramdulari, who bravely opposes the village leader, Gajendra , and his brother, Virendra, as they exploit innocent women, young and old. Tensions escalate when Ramdulari's educated son Prakash, who tries to educate the villagers about what Gajendra and Virendra are doing, falls in love with Gajendra's daughter Sushma. Gajendra locks Ramdulari in her house and sets out to find Prakash. He also locks away Vaidehi in his home to be rewarded by Raghu for returning her to him. After Prakash elopes with Sushma, Gajendra and Virendra gang-rape and burn Ramdulari alive in retaliation.

In a fit of rage, Bhulwa and his men kill Virendra and his goons, though they are severely injured. Vaidehi escapes with Sushma and Prakash. Gajendra attempts to enter politics, so when he is applauded by the local authorities, Vaidehi intervenes and exposes him as a rapist and a murderer. She delivers a heart-wrenching speech about how women in India are only treated as burdens to be married off by their families or tools to get dowry and male heirs by their in-laws. This drives all the women in the audience to assault Gajendra, whom Bhulwa kills later (off-screen). The speech changes Raghu's attitude, and he reforms, reconciling with Vaidehi. They return to New York as a proper married couple.

Vaidehi gives birth to a daughter and names her Ramdulari. She reunites with Raju, who is now a taxi driver married to Maithili. Vaidehi invites them to a charity dance show with Janki in the main role, wherein all the money from her shows goes to fund women's organizations in India.

== Cast ==
- Manisha Koirala as Vaidehi
- Madhuri Dixit as Janki
- Rekha as Ramdulari
- Mahima Chaudhary as Maithili
- Anil Kapoor as Raju – A petty thief
- Ajay Devgan as Bhulwa – A kind-hearted dacoit
- Jackie Shroff as Raghunath – Vaidehi's husband
- Danny Denzongpa as Thakur Gajendra Singh
- Gulshan Grover as Virendra Singh – Gajendra's brother
- Nasirr Khan as Gulshan alias Gullu
- Aarti Chhabria as Sushma Thakur – Gajendra's daughter
- Sharman Joshi as Prakash – Ramdulari's son
- Beena as Vaidehi's mother
- Suresh Oberoi as Raghu's father
- Johnny Lever as Fakhruddin – Raghu's henchman
- Razak Khan as Francis – Raghu's henchman
- Anjan Srivastav as Nekchand – Maithili's father
- Farida Jalal as Saroj – Maithili's mother
- Tinnu Anand as Purshottam
- Jaya Bhattacharya as Lata
- Asrani as Gulab Chand
- Dina Pathak as Maithili's paternal aunt
- Govind Namdeo as Mr. Hazarilal
- Jagdeep as Bansidhar Chakkiwala – Nekchand's friend
- Jeetu Shastri as Villager
- Ritu Shivpuri as Anita
- Rohini Hattangadi as Mrs. Hazarilal
- Viju Khote as Damodar – Brother-in-law of Hazarilal
- Ghanashyam Nayak as Tiku – Prompter at Purshottam Drama Company
- Suhas Bhalekar as a member of Purshottam Drama Company.
- Samir Soni as Manish
- Anupam Shyam as Pimp of Prostitutes
- Subrat Dutta
- Sonali Bendre as herself in song "Saajan Ke Ghar Jaana Hai" (special appearance)
- Urmila Matondkar as herself in song "Aaye Aajaye" (special appearance)
- Gopi Bhalla

== Music ==
Lajja

Soundtrack album by Anu Malik Ilaiyaraaja
- Released: 2001
- Recorded: 1999–2000
- Genre: Feature film soundtrack
- Label: Universal Music India

The songs were mainly composed by Anu Malik. A. R. Rahman was initially signed in as the composer; but then he opted out; after he got extremely busy with his international assignment, Bombay Dreams. Then, the background score for the movie was done by Ilaiyaraaja. Lyrics of all songs were also written by Sameer, except those of "Kaun Dagar Kaun Shehar", which were written by Prasoon Joshi. This song was also composed by Ilaiyaraaja and was sung by Lata Mangeshkar. According to the Indian trade website Box Office India, with around 13,00,000 units sold, this film's soundtrack album was the year's fifteenth highest-selling.

Songs
No.	Title	Lyrics	Music	Singer	Length
1.	"Aaye Aajaye Aa Hi Jaiye"	Sameer	Anu Malik	Anuradha Sriram
2.	"Badi Mushkil"	Sameer	Anu Malik	Alka Yagnik
3.	"Jiyo Jiyo"	Sameer	Anu Malik	K.K.
4.	"Kaliyug Ki Sita"	Sameer	Anu Malik	Anuradha Paudwal
5.	"Kaliyug Ki Sita" (II)	Sameer	Anu Malik	Shubha Mudgal
6.	"Kaun Dagar Kaun Shehar"	Prasoon Joshi	Ilaiyaraaja	Lata Mangeshkar
7.	"Saajan Ke Ghar Jana Hai"	Sameer	Anu Malik	Alka Yagnik, Sonu Nigam, Richa Sharma
8.	"Saajan Ke Ghar Jana Hai (Solo Version) (Not included in the album)"	Sameer	Anu Malik	Alka Yagnik

== Accolades ==
Year	Award	Nominee(s)	Category	Result
2002	47th Filmfare Awards	Ajay Devgn	Best Supporting Actor	Nominated
2002	47th Filmfare Awards	Rekha	Best Supporting Actress	Nominated
2002	47th Filmfare Awards	Madhuri Dixit	Best Supporting Actress	Nominated
2002	Zee Cine Awards	Madhuri Dixit	Best Supporting Actress	Won

== Reception ==
The film received mixed reviews; however, the performances from the lead actors were highly praised.

Bollywood Hungama gave a rating of two and a half out of five stars and said, "On the whole, Lajja is a purposeful film within commercial parameters, and the best part is that the Indian masses will be able to identify with the goings-on. An enviable star cast, a talented director, and an excellent second half are amongst its strong points." The Hindu stated "Unfortunately, this colourful film is a black-and-white disappointment, particularly in the second half when Santoshi loses track of his story and in a blatant bid to get the tax-free certificate brings in bits about computer education, female literacy and infanticide.". Jay Virdee of the BBC gave a positive review saying "The film is well directed, excellent songs, although they should have had more realistic fights." Anita Bora of Rediff wrote "Santoshi deserves more than a generous dose of credit for trying to portray both sides of the story -- through powerful and well sketched characters and treading into a territory which not too many mainstream directors explore".

== Box office ==
Lajja failed commercially at the box office in India due to high budget and distribution price. It was successful internationally, ranking 14th on the British box-office chart, and in North America it ranked 31 on the top 100 box-office chart according to Variety.
