= Ragini Nandwani =

Indian actress

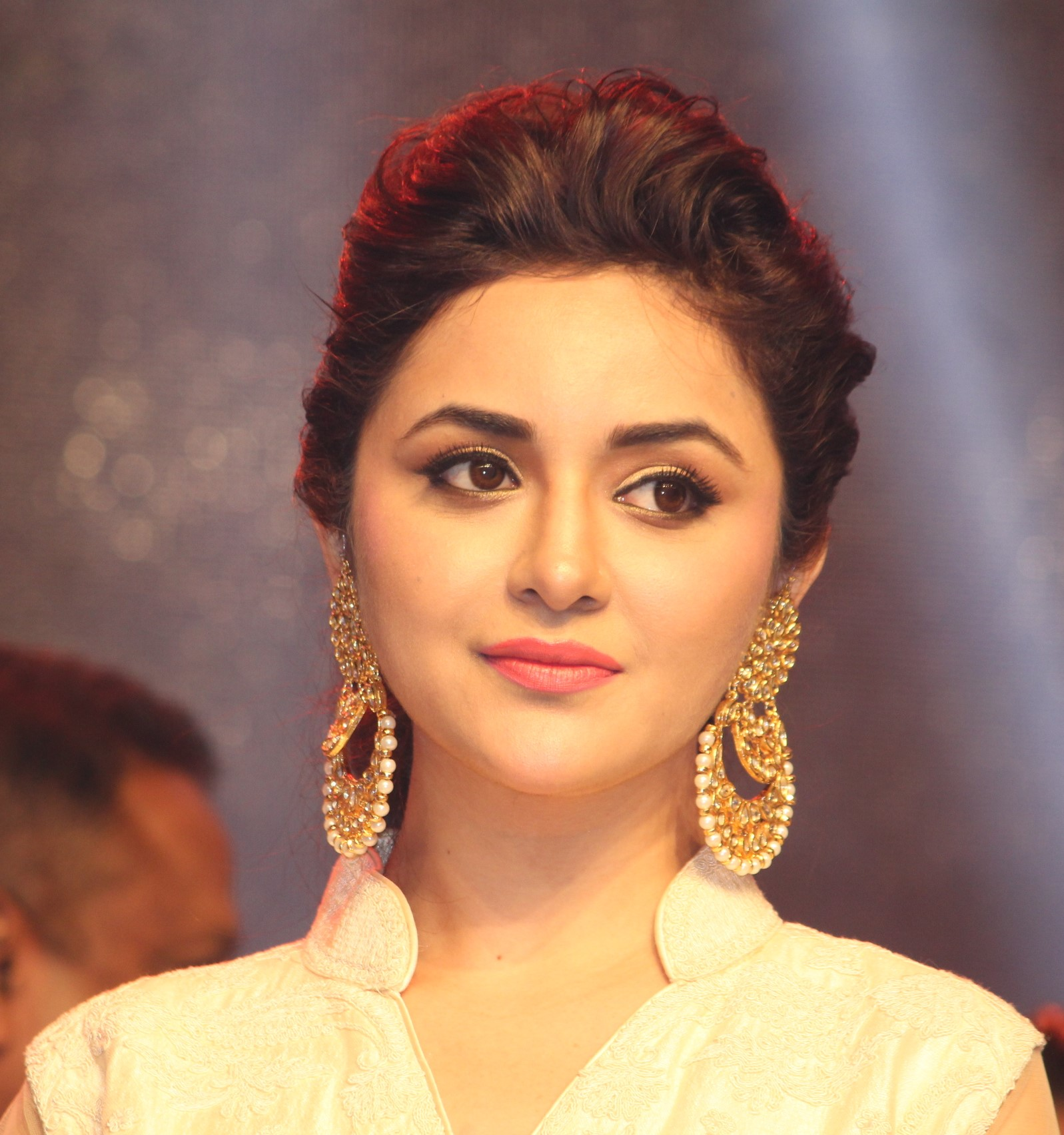
- Nandwani in 2016
- Born: Sheena Nandwani; 4 September 1989 (age 37); Dehradun, Uttarakhand, India
- Occupation: Actress
- Years active: 2004–present

Ragini Nandwani (born 4 September 1989) is an Indian actress who appears in Hindi, Tamil and Malayalam-language films and television. She became popular after playing the lead in the Hindi soap opera Mrs. Kaushik Ki Paanch Bahuein (2011–12). She made her Bollywood debut with the crime thriller film Dehraadun Diary (2013), which was based on a real murder case.

Nandwani made her debut in the Tamil film industry with the action thriller film Thalaivaa (2013), directed by A. L. Vijay. She starred opposite Vijay.

== Early life ==
Nandwani was born on 4 September 1989 in Dehradun, Uttarakhand, India.

== Career ==
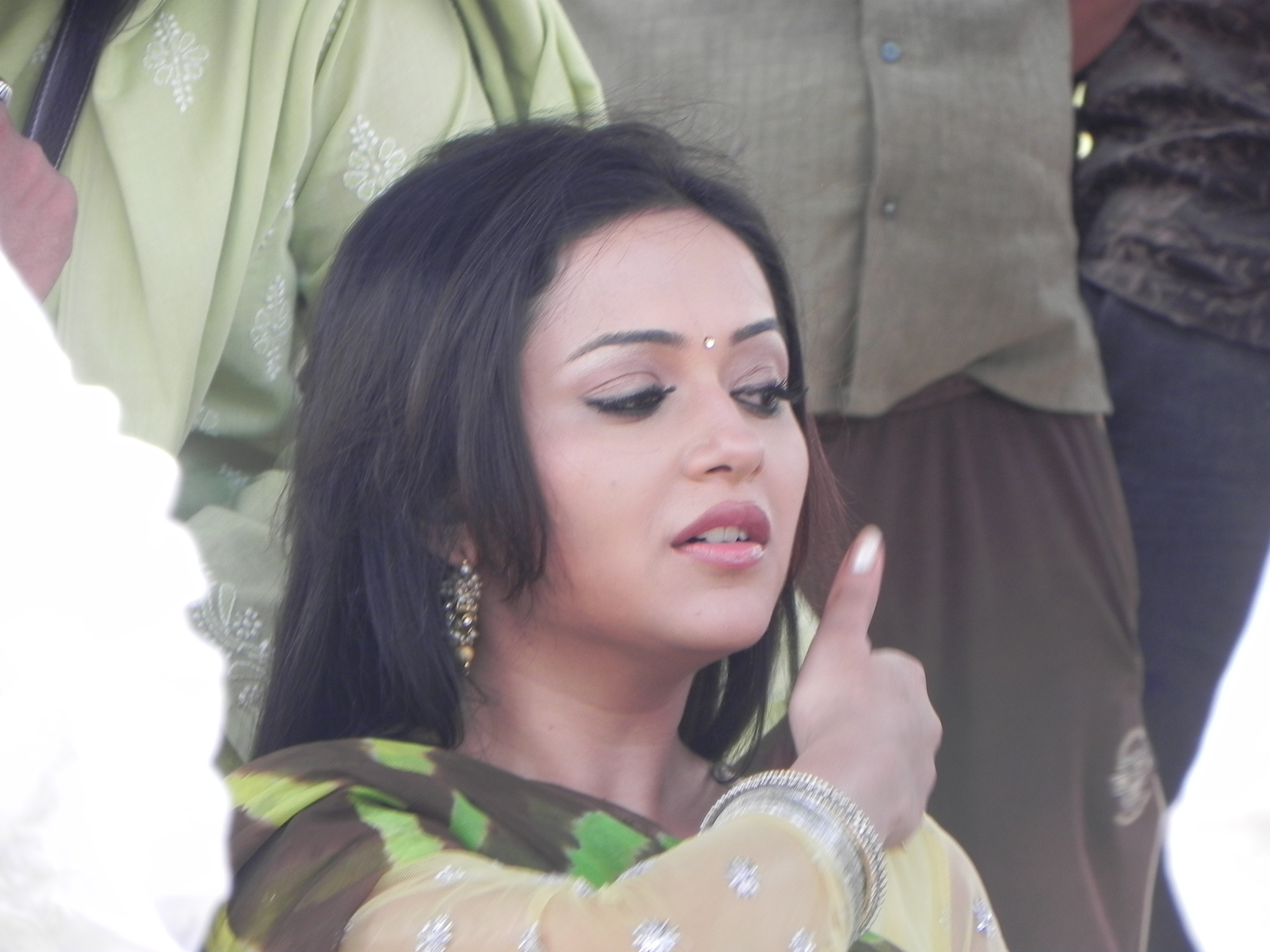
Nandwani on the sets of Mrs. Kaushik Ki Paanch Bahuein in Jaipur in 2011

Nandwani started her career with small supporting roles in television shows like Ye Meri Life Hai, Thodi Khushi Thode Gham and CID (Episodic appearance). In 2011, Nandwani came into the limelight with Zee TV's daily soap Mrs. Kaushik Ki Paanch Bahuein. Nandwani played the lead role of Lovely Kaushik, an unconventional daughter-in-law and earned a good name for herself. Meanwhile, the actress was approached for a Hindi film. She auditioned for the film and got selected. Nandwani then chose to opt out of the TV show in October 2012 and was replaced by another actress.

Ragini then started shooting for the Hindi film which was later titled as Dehradun Diary. Her co-stars in the film were Adhyayan Suman, Ashwini Kalsekar, Rati Agnihotri, Neelima Azeem and Rohit Bakshi. The film was based on a real murder case. The film was released on 4 January 2013 but didn't prove to be a commercially successful film and was a box office flop. The film also received mixed to negative reviews from the critics. Despite the film's failure, Nandwani managed to get many film offers.

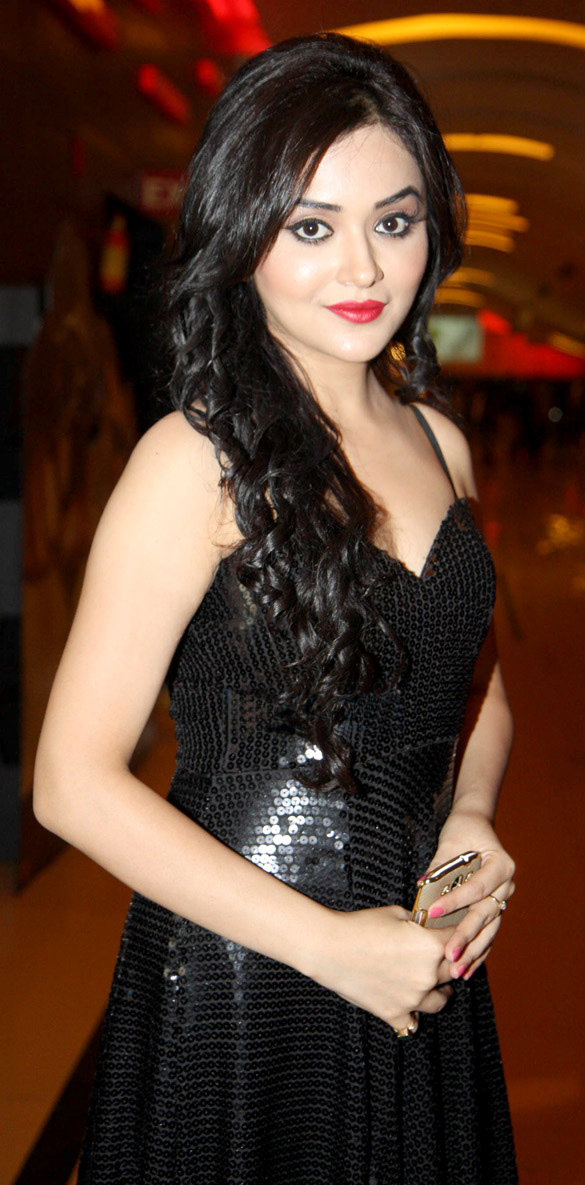
Nandwani at the audio release of Dehraadun Diary in 2013

The actress got her first major break in the Tamil flick Thalaivaa, opposite Vijay, who is a superstar in the Tamil film industry. The film is an action thriller film directed by A. L. Vijay and Nandwani has a key role of a North Indian in the film, which basically features Amala Paul as the female lead. Nandwani stated in an interview that all of her film sequences were shot in Mumbai over 25–30 days. The film was released worldwide on 9 August 2013 except in Tamil Nadu and Puducherry, where it was delayed due to some controversies, but finally released on 20 August 2013. The film received good response from the audience as well the critics, but the film suffered a severe loss commercially due to its late release in Tamil Nadu.

Nandwani's performance in Thalaivaa was well received by the audience. She has been offered more South Indian films, but she is first brushing up on her language project. She will now be seen in a cameo role in a Marathi film Krupa Swaminchi, which is based on the life of Shri Swami Samarth. She is also looking forward to work simultaneously in Hindi films and television shows as well.

After the successful performance in Thalaivaa, she was offered to act in the commercial Malayalam movie project Peruchazhi [meaning :bandicoot rat], as a heroine opposite Mohanlal along with Mukesh. The film became a big hit in the Mollywood industry.

Nandwani is currently shooting for the Telugu film Siddhartha, opposite Sagar, produced by Dasari Kiran Kumar, who earlier produced films like Genius and Ramleela. Dayanand Reddy, who worked ten years in Pawan Kalyan creative works banner, is making his debut as director with this film. The film is scheduled to release soon. She was also seen in Bhakton Ki Bhakti Mein Shakti on Life OK in 2016 (episodic role).

She is currently working in a Marathi film Krupa Swaminchi. She has also signed a Bollywood film which will be officially announced soon. She has done a Malayalam movie Peruchazhi, in which she appears as the female lead opposite to Mohanlal.

== Filmography ==
=== Films ===
Year	Title	Role	Language	Notes
2005	Ayodhya	Zarina	Tamil	
2013	Dehraadun Diary	Priti Thakur	Hindi	
2013	Thalaivaa	Gowri Mohan	Tamil	
2013	Krupa Swaminchi		Hindi	Cameo appearance
2014	Peruchazhi	Jessy	Malayalam	
2016	Siddhartha	Sahastra	Telugu	
2017	Hadiyya	Saara	Malayalam	

=== Television ===
Year	Title	Role	Notes
2005	Ye Meri Life Hai	Koena	Supporting role
2006	Thodi Khushi Thode Gham	Hetal Shah	Supporting role
2007	CID		Episodic Role (The Case of the Missing Bride) Ep 462
2011-2012	Mrs. Kaushik Ki Paanch Bahuein	Lovely Tyagi, Dulari	Lead role. Replaced by Vindhya Tiwari
2011	Sa Re Ga Ma Pa Li'l Champs 2011	Lovely Tyagi	Guest
2016	Bhakton Ki Bhakti Mein Shakti		
2016-2017	SuperCops vs Supervillains	Princess Adonia	Lead role
