= Majaz: Ae Gham-e-Dil Kya Karun =

- Directed by: Ravindra Singh
- Written by: Shakeel Akhtar
- Screenplay by: Shakeel Akhtar
- Produced by: Shakeel Akhtar; Madihur Rahman
- Starring: Priyanshu Chatterjee; Rashmi Mishra; Neelima Azeem; Anas Khan; Shahab Khan
- Cinematography: Shakti Soni
- Edited by: Amber K Vyas
- Music by: Sonu Nigam; Alka Yagnik; Talat Aziz; Keya Dutt
- Production company: Dream Merchant Films
- Release date: 20 January 2017
- Running time: 2hr58min
- Country: India
- Languages: Hindi; Urdu

Majaz - Ae Gham-e-Dil Kya Karun is a 2017 Indian Hindi-language biographical-drama film directed by Ravindra Singh and produced by Shakeel Akhtar. It stars Priyanshu Chatterjee as the titular Majaz, an Indian Urdu poet and Rashmi Mishra as Nazia, his love interest. It was released on 20 January 2017.

== Plot ==
The film follows the tragic life of renowned poet Asrar-ul-Haq Majaz, whose early fame as a romantic poet is overshadowed by his struggles with alcoholism. His downward spiral worsens when he falls in love with a married admirer, leading to a tale of unrequited love, heartbreak, and self-destruction.

== Cast ==
- Priyanshu Chatterjee as Majaz
- Rashmi Mishra as Nazia
- Anas Khan as Hashim
- Kajal Raghwani as Meena Bai
- Neelima Azeem as Nabi
- Shahab Khan as Asim
- Talha Thakur as Musafir

== Music ==
1. "Ae Gham-e-Dil (Title Song)" - Talat Aziz
2. "Allah O Ghani (Sufiyana)" - Sonu Nigam
3. "Barbad Ae Tamana" - Talat Aziz
4. "Chalo Re Sakhi" - Sugandha
5. "Dekhna Jazbe Mohabbat" - Talat Aziz
6. "Husn Ko Behijab" - Talat Aziz
7. "Kuch Tujko Khabar (Female)" - Alka Yagnik
8. "Kuch Tujko Khabar (Male)" - Talat Aziz
9. "Teskin -e Dil" - Talat Aziz
10. "Ye Mera Chaman" - Talat Aziz

== Reception ==
The film received negative reviews in Times of India and The Free Press Journal.
