= Prince (1969 film) =

- Poster
- Directed by: Lekh Tandon
- Written by: Abrar Alvi
- Produced by: F. C. Mehra
- Starring: Shammi Kapoor; Vyjayanthimala; Ajit; Rajendra Nath
- Cinematography: Dwarka Divecha
- Edited by: Pran Mehra
- Music by: Shankar Jaikishan
- Production companies: Vijaya Studio; Mehboob Studio
- Distributed by: Eagle Films
- Release date: 1 January 1969
- Country: India
- Language: Hindi
- Box office: ₹ 4 crore

Prince is a 1969 Indian Hindi-language film produced by F. C. Mehra and directed by Lekh Tandon. The film stars Shammi Kapoor with Vyjayanthimala in the lead while Rajendranath, Ajit, Helen, Leela Chitnis and Asit Sen form an ensemble cast. The film's music was composed by Shankar Jaikishan with lyrics by Hasrat Jaipuri and Faruk Qaiser. Prince is a drama set in the times of resurgent India when the nation threw off the British yoke, but some states still languished under the Princely yoke. It is the story of a Prince who brought about his own downfall so that he may rise as a human being. Vyjayanthimala got married in 1968 and then completed this film in 1969.

The rights to this film are owned by Shah Rukh Khan's Red Chillies Entertainment.

== Plot ==
Rajkumar Shamsher Singh is the only son of the local Maharaja, and has been brought up as a brat, and now he is an irresponsible, alcoholic, and womanizing adult, who wants everyone to bow down before him and his princely rank. One priest refuses to do so, and Shamsher pummels him mercilessly, though in vain. Frustrated, he asks the priest what he should do with his mundane life, and the priest tells him that he should repent, sacrifice all his palatial pleasures, and live the life of a simple and ordinary man, and hence learn the true meaning of life, for at least six months. Shamsher agrees to do so, and arranges an accident with his car, which plummets down a mountain, explodes and is blown to smithereens. Everyone in the palace believes that Shamsher is dead. He goes to a nearby village, and a blind woman there mistakes him for her long-lost son and starts calling him Sajjan Singh. Shamsher decides to play along as Sajjan.

Two corrupt palace officials spot Sajjan, and notice his similarity to Shamsher, and conspire with him to pose as Shamsher for a hefty sum of money, to which Sajjan agrees. When he accompanies the officials back to the palace, he is shocked to find that his father has remarried a much younger woman, Ratna, and shortly after marrying her, has died, leaving the palace and its management to her and her greedy brother. Shamsher decides to reveal his true identity, but the officials threaten to expose him to his new-found blind mother, and Shamsher knows that he is trapped in the body of Sajjan Singh, forced to pose as none other than himself.

== Cast ==
- Shammi Kapoor as Prince Shamsher Singh / Sajjan Singh
- Vyjayanthimala as Princess Amrita
- Rajendra Nath as Vilayatiram
- Ajit as Ratna's brother
- Helen as Sophia
- Leela Chitnis as Mrs. Shanti Singh
- Parveen Choudhary as Ratna
- Sudhir as Sajjan Singh
- Sunder as Zoravar
- Rashid Khan Zorawar Singh
- Sapru (actor) as The King of Jamnapur
- Ulhas as The King of Ramnagar
- Leela Mishra as Kamla
- David Abraham as Diwan
- Randhir (actor) as Michael
- Pinchoo Kapoor as Colonel
- Bramh Bharadwaj as Commissioner
- Shyam Kumar as Ratan assistant of King of Jamnapur
- Rajan Kapoor as Dacoit
- Asit sen as Dacoit's man
- Maqsood as a guest in Shamsher's birthday party

== Production Team ==
F. C. Mehra and Lekh Tandon had previously worked with Vyjayanthimala in the historical film Amrapali (1966). The team of producer F. C. Mehra, director Lekh Tandon, actor Shammi Kapoor and musicians Shankar-Jaikishan had earlier worked together on the hit film Professor (1962). F.C. had also worked with Shammi earlier in Mujrim (1958), Ujala (1959) and Singapore (1960).

== Soundtrack ==
Prince

Soundtrack album by Shankar Jaikishan
- Released: 1969
- Recorded: Minoo Katrak
- Genre: Film soundtrack
- Label: The Gramophone Company of India
- Producer: Shankar Jaikishan

Shankar Jaikishan chronology
Pyar Hi Pyar (1969)	Prince (1969)	Jahan Pyar Mile (1969)

The film's soundtrack was composed by the Shankar Jaikishan duo, while the lyrics were penned by Hasrat Jaipuri and Farooq Qaiser. The album had Mohammed Rafi, Lata Mangeshkar and Asha Bhonsle who lent their voice to Shammi Kapoor, Vyjayanthimala and Helen respectively.

The hit song "Badan Pe Sitare", sung by Rafi, was covered by Sonu Nigam in Fanney Khan (2018), starring Anil Kapoor, Aishwarya Rai Bachchan, and Rajkummar Rao. The music video featured Kapoor in the lead.

Song	Singer(s)	Lyricist
"Muqabla Hum Se Na Karo"	Lata Mangeshkar, Mohammed Rafi, Asha Bhosle	Hasrat Jaipuri
"Thandi Thandi Hawa"	Lata Mangeshkar and chorus	Hasrat Jaipuri
"Badan Pe Sitare Lapete"	Mohammad Rafi	Hasrat Jaipuri
"Madhosh Hawa Matwal"	Mohammad Rafi	Farooq Qaiser
"Nazar Mein Bijili"	Mohammad Rafi	Farooq Qaiser
"Bachke Jane Na Doongi"	Lata Mangeshkar, Mohammed Rafi	Farooq Qaiser

== Box office ==
At the end of its theatrical run, the film grossed around ₹4,00,00,000 with a net of ₹2,00,00,000, thus becoming the fourth highest grossing film of 1969 with a verdict of All Time BlockBuster at Box Office India.
