= Lekh Tandon =

Indian filmmaker and actor

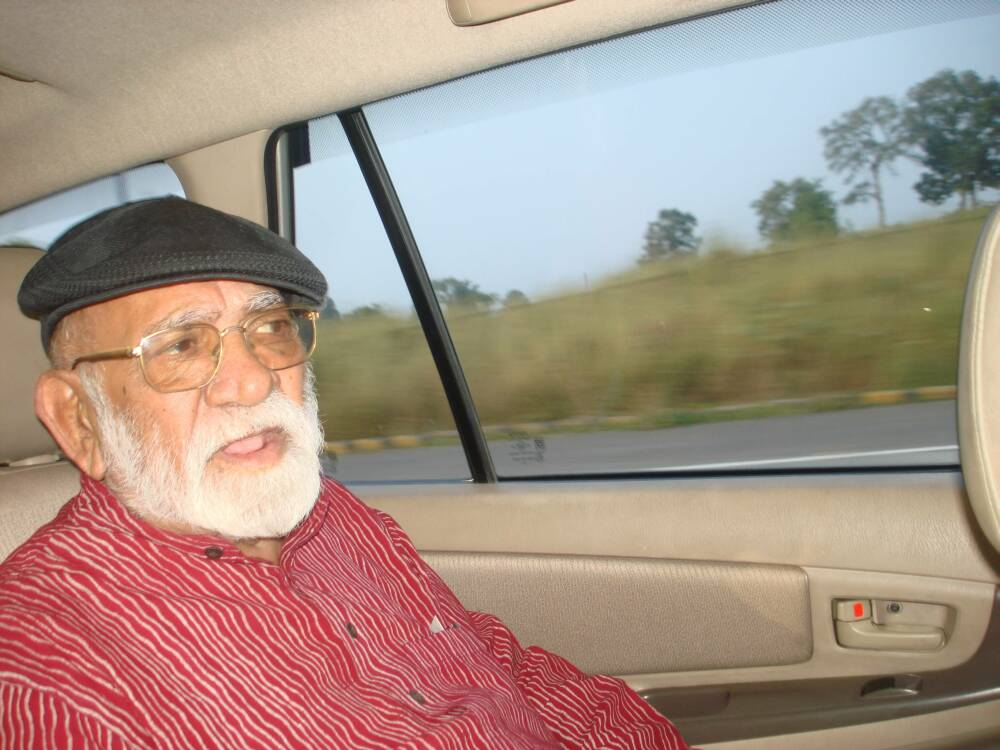
- Born: Lekhraj Tandon; 13 February 1929; Sheikhupura, Punjab, British India
- Died: 15 October 2017 (aged 88); Mumbai, Maharashtra, India
- Occupations: actor, director
- Years active: 1947–2017
- Spouse: Swarn Savran (m. 1955) (predeceased)
- Children: Nitin Tandon, Geeta Malhotra, Rahul Tandon, Anuradha Rawte

Lekh Tandon (born Lekhraj Tandon; 13 February 1929 – 15 October 2017) was an Indian filmmaker and actor. He had directed numerous Bollywood movies and Indian TV Serials. He gained national fame due to success of his directorial ventures Professor, Prince, Ek Baar Kaho and Agar Tum Na Hote. His films Amrapali starring Sunil Dutt and Agar Tum Na Hote starring Rajesh Khanna are considered as classics. Later after 2000, he had acted in movies such as Swades, Rang De Basanti, Chennai Express and Chaarfutiya Chhokare. He was the brother of Urdu playwright Yograj Tandon.

== Biography ==
Lekh's father, Faqeer Chand Tandon, had studied with Prithviraj Kapoor at Khalsa High School (Lyallpur, Punjab, British India), and had been friends. Kapoor inspired Lekh to work in Bollywood. Around same time, Lekh's brother Yograj was working as assistant director and secretary to Kapoor.

Lekh started as Assistant Director in Hindi movie industry in 1950s and became a director of several hit movies beginning with Professor (1962 film). Though the prestigious film Jhuk Gaya Aasman starring Rajendra Kumar and Saira Bano did not become successful at box office, they are considered classics. His successful directorial ventures at box office include Prince (1969 film), Ek Baar Kaho, Agar Tum Na Hote. Dulhan Wahi Jo Piya Man Bhaye was one of his biggest hits and the film's heroine Rameshwari told The Times of India that Tandon was involved in every aspect of the film. She also said that the film was released without any publicity. Actor Victor Banerjee, who played the leading role in his film, Doosri Dulhan, described him as a director who "loved his craft and could deftly weave the commercial angle in a decently-told narrative." For this film Khanna received Best Actor award and Tandon received Best director award at Filmfans Association Awards in 1983. Then he moved on to nascent TV scene and started directing TV serials. His first offering was Phir Wahi Talash on India's National Television Channel Doordarshan. Lekh is credited with discovering Shahrukh Khan by casting him in his TV serial Dil Dariya. Lekh is also discovering Lankesh Bhardwaj by appoint him as an assistant in Writing with him in the year 2001 and give him an opportunity as an actor in Ek Aangan Ho Gaye Doh. He also directed TV serial Farmaan, broadcast on Doordarshan in early 1990s.

== Awards and recognition ==
- He shared the 1978 Filmfare Best Screenplay Award for his movie, Dulhan Wahi Jo Piya Man Bhaye, with Vrajendra Gaur and Madhusudan Kalekar.
- His biopic, Amrapali starring Vyjayanthimala and Sunil Dutt, was India's submission to the 39th Academy Awards for the Best Foreign Language Film
- He received the Best Director Award for his film Agar Tum Na Hote starring Rajesh Khanna in Filmfans Association of India in 1983.

== Filmography ==
=== As director ===
- Phir Ussi Mod Par (2018)
- Daraar
- Adhikar
- Do Rahain (1997)
- Jeena Nahi Bin Tere (1995)
- Uttarayan (1985)
- Agar Tum Na Hote (1983)
- Doosri Dulhan (1983)
- Khuda Kasam (1981)
- Sharada (1981)
- Ek Baar Kaho (1980)
- Dulhan Wahi Jo Piya Man Bhaaye (1977)
- Andolan (1975)
- Jahan Pyar Mile (1969)
- Prince (1969)
- Jhuk Gaya Aasman (1968)
- Amrapali (1966)
- Professor (1962)
- Shokhiyan (1951) as Assistant Director
- Bawre Nain (1950) as Assistant Director
- Neki Aur Badi (1949) as Assistant Director
- Aag (1948 film), as Assistant Camera Man

=== As TV director ===
- Dil Dariya (1988-1989)
- Phir Wahi Talash (1989-1990)
- Doosra Keval (1989) (DD1)
- Farmaan (1994)
- Ladai
- Pyale Mein Toofan
- Adhikar (1996-1999) (Zee TV)
- Milan (2000-2001) Sony TV
- Yarana (Dubai Television)
- Aisa Des Hai Mera (2006)
- Ek Angan Ke Ho Gaye Do (2010) - with Avinash, Lankesh Bhardwaj "Dev" and ors.
- Bikhari Aas Nikhari Preet
- Kahan Se Kahan Tak (2016)

=== As actor ===
- Swades (2004) - Dadaji (Village Chief)
- Paheli - Wise Man
- Rang De Basanti - Daljeet "DJ's" Grandfather
- Halla Bol - Lekh Tandon
- Chaarfutiya Chhokare - Kailash
- Chennai Express (2013) - Bhishambhar Mithaiwala (Rahul's grandfather)
