= Sooryavansham =

1999 Indian film by E. V. V. Satyanarayana

- Theatrical release poster
- Directed by: E. V. V. Satyanarayana
- Screenplay by: E. V. V. Satyanarayana
- Dialogues by: Aadesh K. Arjun
- Story by: Vikraman
- Based on: Suryavamsam (Tamil)
- Produced by: G. Adiseshagiri Rao
- Starring: Amitabh Bachchan; Soundarya
- Cinematography: S. Gopala Reddy
- Edited by: Gautham Raju
- Music by: Songs: Anu Malik; Score: Koti
- Production company: Padmalaya Combines
- Distributed by: Goldmines Telefilms and Sony SetMax
- Release date: 21 May 1999 (India)
- Running time: 220 minutes
- Country: India
- Language: Hindi
- Budget: ₹7 crore
- Box office: ₹12.65 crore

Sooryavansham (pronounced [suːɾjəʋənʃəm], transl. Solar dynasty) is a 1999 Indian Hindi-language action drama film directed by E. V. V. Satyanarayana. It stars Amitabh Bachchan in a dual role, with Soundarya, Jayasudha, Rachna Banerjee, Anupam Kher and Kader Khan. The film is a remake of the 1997 Tamil-language film Surya Vamsam, and revolves around a traditional father and his illiterate yet obedient son.

Made on a budget of ₹7 crore (US$943,000), principal photography took place in and around various locations in India such as Hyderabad, Gujarat and Rajasthan, as well as Sri Lanka. S. Gopal Reddy acted as the cinematographer, while Gautham Raju edited the film. Koti composed the film score while Anu Malik composed the film's songs, with lyrics penned by Sameer.

The film opened to positive reviews towards the performance of Bachchan but ended up being a box-office bomb, grossing only ₹12.65 crore (US$1.4 million). However, over the years, it has gathered cult following among the Indian diaspora, and has been telecast frequently on the television channel Sony Max.

== Plot ==
The Sooryavansh family head, Thakur Bhanu Pratap Singh, is the respected sarpanch of the village of Bharatpur. He has rendered yeoman service not only to the people of Bharatpur but also to those of eighteen neighboring villages. He lives in a mansion with his wife Sharda and his three sons, Karan, Varun, and Heera. Heera, the youngest, is illiterate and therefore treated like a servant. Disliked by Bhanupratap, he is excluded from family matters and confined to menial tasks. Despite this treatment, Heera loves his father unconditionally and finds affection only from his mother and his friend Dharmendra (Mindra), a servant in the household.

Days before the wedding of Bhanupratap's daughter, the groom arrives with his sister Radha. Mistaking Heera for a servant, Radha makes him run errands. On the wedding day, she is shocked to learn from her father that Heera is Bhanupratap’s son. Curious, she asks Mindra to tell her about Heera’s past.

As a child, Heera consistently failed in school but continued attending to see Gauri, a girl adopted by Bhanupratap after her parents’ death. When a teacher beat Gauri, Heera quit studies altogether. Believing that Heera’s presence would hinder Gauri’s education, Bhanupratap sent her to a boarding school. When they grew up, Bhanupratap arranged their marriage. However, Gauri, unwilling to marry an illiterate man, attempted suicide. Heera saved her but accepted the blame, claiming he had refused the marriage. Bhanupratap misunderstood, thinking Heera harbored lust for Gauri, and his hatred for his son deepened. Gauri later married a wealthy man. Moved by Heera’s story, Radha proposes marriage to him, and he accepts.

Meanwhile, Deshraj Thakur, another zamindar in Bharatpur, aims to ruin Bhanupratap’s family by marrying Radha to his son Arjun. This would force Radha’s lawyer father to act in Deshraj’s favor, giving Deshraj an advantage over Bhanupratap. Radha’s mother approves the alliance and pressures Bhanupratap to separate Radha from Heera. Bhanupratap gives Heera an ultimatum: either marry Radha or regain his father’s respect. Encouraged by Mindra, Heera chooses Radha. On the wedding day, he elopes with her, angering Bhanupratap, who disowns him.

Heera and Radha settle in Mindra’s house on the village outskirts. Heera works as a labourer in a transport company before starting his own transport business with money borrowed from Radha’s uncle, Ranjeet. Naming the company after his father, in time, Heera becomes wealthy and respected. At the same time, Radha clears the UPSC examination and becomes an IAS officer. The couple has a son, named after Heera’s father, and nicknamed him Sonu. Bhanupratap, however, continues to hate Heera despite his rise in status.

Heera later fulfills his father’s dream of establishing a hospital for the poor. At the inauguration, he publicly credits his success to Bhanupratap, believing his father had expelled him so he could learn to depend on himself. Bhanupratap, secretly present at the ceremony, overhears this.

While reconsidering his actions, Bhanupratap encounters his grandson Sonu outside school and begins secretly spending time with him. Learning of this, Heera asks Sonu to give some kheer to his “friend” the next time they meet. Meanwhile, Sharda pleads with Bhanupratap to reconcile with Heera. Bhanupratap, tormented by guilt, phones his son but collapses after coughing blood. He is hospitalized, and Deshraj accuses Heera of poisoning the kheer to kill his father.

As Deshraj’s men assault Heera, Bhanupratap recovers and came to his son’s rescue. He reveals that the kheer had been poisoned by Deshraj himself. The father-son duo beat up Deshraj and his men until Deshraj confesses to his crime. Finally, with the family reuniting, Bhanupratap embraces Heera in front of all their relatives.

== Cast ==
- Amitabh Bachchan in a dual role as:
  - Thakur Bhanu Pratap Singh
  - Heera Bhanu Pratap Thakur, Bhanu's son
- Soundarya as Radha Thakur (voice dubbed by Rekha)
- Rachna Banerjee as Gauri Singh, Heera’s childhood friend
- Jayasudha as Sharda Thakur, Bhanu’s wife (voice dubbed by Rekha)
- Anupam Kher as Dharmendra “Mindra” Tripathi
- Mukesh Rishi as Deshraj “Kevada” Thakur
- Rajesh Khattar as Varun Thakur, Bhanu’s younger son
- Ananda Vardhan as Sonu (Thakur Bhanu Pratap Singh Jr.), Heera and Radha’s son (voice dubbed by Prachi Save Saathi)
- Ahuti Prasad as Karan Thakur, Bhanu’s elder son
- Bindu as Lawyer Mona, Radha's mother
- Shivaji Satam as Lawyer Ramesh, Radha's father
- Neelima Azeem as Mrs. Varun Thakur
- Kader Khan as Rtd. Major Ranjeet Singh
- Imran Khan as Arjun Thakur, Kevada’s son
- Brahmanandam as Dr. P. K. Mare
- Chalapathi Rao as Police Commissioner
- M. Shailaja as Kamli
- Raja Ravindra as Gauri's husband
- Ramya Sri as a servant
- AVS as a beggar

== Production ==
The film was initially to be directed by Vikraman, the director of Surya Vamsam (1997) with R. B. Choudary of Super Good Films and G. Adiseshagiri Rao of Padmalaya Studios as the producers. Songs were recorded and composed by Anu Malik at various places in Chennai including at the White House, Saligramam; V G P Video Studio at Mount Road; and The Residency. The film was planned to be shot in Rajasthan. Vikraman chose both looks for Amitabh Bachchan and a photoshoot occurred in Mumbai and AVM Studios, Chennai with Arthur A. Wilson as the cinematographer. After R. B. Choudary left the film, Vikraman mutually decided to leave the film also.

Before working in Hindi language films, Soundarya had acted in a total of 65 South Indian films. Her brother Amarnath, who managed her career, stated that she always performed decorous roles and same would be the case in Bollywood. Soundarya said that she was excited when a role in the film was offered to her and to have got an opportunity to co-star with Amitabh Bachchan. Having studied Sanskrit, the actress added, she was quite comfortable with Hindi, and could read and write it. She also asked the viewers to be optimistic about the film, although the actress was a bit dubious about her role.

The film's muhurat ceremony was attended by a number of celebrities from the Telugu cinema, including Nagarjuna, Venkatesh, Vijaya Nirmala, and Naresh. Rekha lent her voice for actresses Jayasudha and Soundarya. The film was shot at Ramoji Film City, Hyderabad.

== Soundtrack ==
Sooryavansham

Soundtrack album by Anu Malik
- Released: 7 April 1999
- Genre: Feature film soundtrack
- Length: 44 Min
- Label: Venus Records & Tapes

The film score was composed by Koti while the songs were composed by Anu Malik. The songs were written by Sameer.

Sooryavansham (Original Motion Picture Soundtrack)

#	Title	Singer(s)
1.	"Chori Se Chori Se"	Amitabh Bachchan, Sonu Nigam, Jaspinder Narula
2.	"Peepal Ke Patwa"	Sonu Nigam, Jaspinder Narula
3.	"Dil Mere Tu Deewana Hai"	Kumar Sanu
4.	"Sooryavansham"	Sonu Nigam
5.	"Kore Kore Sapne"	Kumar Sanu, Anuradha Paudwal
6.	"Dil Mere Tu Deewana Hai" (Sad)	Kumar Sanu
7.	"Har Subah"	Kumar Sanu, K. S. Chithra
8.	"Dil Mere Tu Deewana Hai" (Female)	K. S. Chithra

== Reception ==
=== Box office ===
In India, the film had box office collections of ₹6.67 crore nett and ₹11.42 crore gross. Overseas, the film collected $285,000, including £53,000 in the United Kingdom. Worldwide, the film grossed ₹12.65 crore. The film was a success in Rajasthan, where the joint family concept was prevalent, but ran below average in Maharashtra. Vikraman attributed the film's failure to the cast and crew making it feel like a Telugu film. The film became successful through satellite television recasts.
