= Junoon (1994 TV series) =

Indian drama television series

- Directed by: A.Salam
- Starring: See below
- Opening theme: A.Salam
- Original language: Hindi
- No. of seasons: 1
- No. of episodes: 510

Production
- Producer: Prem Krishan
- Running time: 30 minutes
- Production company: Cinevistaas Limited

Original release
- Network: DD National
- Release: 1994 – 1998

Junoon (transl. Craze) is a television series produced by Cinevistaas Limited. The series was first broadcast on DD National in 1994. It aired for five years, totaling 510 episodes and setting a record for the longest-running prime time program on Doordarshan. The series revolves around the rivalry between the patriarchs of two well-known families, Rajvansh and Dhanraj, who lead their professional and personal lives with animosity towards each other.

== Cast ==
=== Main ===
- Parikshit Sahni as Bharat Kumar Rajvansh/Ri Bahadur Sumer's father
- Beena Banerjee as Deepavati Rajvansh, Sumer's mother
- Ravindra Kapoor as Thakur Diwan and friend of Bharat Kumar Rajvansh
- Kishori Shahane as Chandni and biological mother of Sumer Rajvansh
- Sarita Joshi as Ranibai, Chandni's mother
- Lalit Tiwari as Freedom fighter Arun Chakravorty, Rekha's father
- Saeed Jaffrey as Vinayak Shankar, Reema's father
- Farida Jalal as Gauri, Reema's mother
- Neena Gupta as Reema Shankar, Sumer's sister
- Mangal Dhillon as Sumer Rajvansh
- Archana Puran Singh as Rekha Chakravorty, Arun's daughter
- Kavin Dave as Vishal Rajvansh, Sumer Rajvansh's son
- Dina Pathak as Savitri Dhanraj, Aditya's grandmother
- Vishnu Sharma as Lala Jagdish Prakash, Savitri's relative, Aditya's and Dhanraj's properties caretaker after Brijbhushan's death
- Benjamin Gilani as Brijbhushan Dhanraj, Aditya's father
- Smita Jaykar as Anuradha Dhanraj, Aditya's mother
- Suresh Chatwal as Manmohan Dhanraj, Aditya's uncle
- Shashi Puri as Aditya Dhanraj

=== Recurring ===
- Navin Nischol as Justice Rameshwar Bhatnagar, Nalini's father
- Tanuja Samarth as Advocate Pratibha Mathur, Justice Bhatnagar's wife, Nalini's mother
- Anant Mahadevan as Advocate Vrinal Modi, Pratibha Mathur Friend and Advocate.
- Kiran Juneja as Advocate Nalini Mathur, Justice Bhatnagar, and Pratibha's daughter
- Vijayendra Ghatge as Advocate Neil Bhatia, Nalini's colleague, Criminal lawyer Aditya's Lawyer, Mini's ex-husband
- Sudha Chopra as Nirmala Bhatia, Neil's mother
- Shubha Khote as Dr.D'souza
- Dinesh Kaushik as Ketan
- Pankaj Berry as Mr Visham Agrawal, Mini's father
- Shivraj as Ramdas, servant of Mr Visham Agarwal
- Kitu Gidwani as Mini Agrawal
- Tom Alter as Don Keshav Kalsi/KK/Collector in British Raj
- Sudhir Dalvi as Nana Nagarkar, a crime lord, Sumer's syndicate, and KK's God-father in crime
- Vinod Kapoor as Advocate of Keshav Kalsi and Nana Nagarkar
- Gavin Packard as Masita
- Shagufta Ali as Farheen (Masita's girlfriend)
- Parmeet Sethi as Bobby (KK's stepbrother)
- Deepika Deshpande as Vibha, Bobby's lover
- Mohan Gokhale as Jay (KK's stepbrother)
- Kalpana Iyer as Parvati (KK's mother)
- Ajit Vachani as Shergill, Parvati's husband
- Virendra Razdan as Mr. Adhikari, Sumer's soliceter
- Ranjeet as Pathan Sherkhan, Henchman of Saudagar Singh
- Puneet Issar as Saudagar Singh (From episode no 125)
- Rama Vij as Basanti, Wife of Saudagar Singh (Dead), only comes in her dreams.
- Rajesh Khattar as ACP Wajahad Ali, Inspector investigating Seema Dhanraj's murder case, KK's enemy.
- Neelima Azeem as Shabana, Wajahad Ali's wife.
- Ravi Jhankal as Manish Mahajan
- Sheela David as Kajri, Manish Mahajan's wife.
- Shiva Rindani as Mukhtar Singh (From episode no 126)
- Hemant Birje as Ujagar
- Rajit Kapur as Sheetal
- Vikram Gokhale as Commissioner Brij Narayan Baweja, UP
- Soni Razdan as Sulbha
- Chandrashekhar as Justice Habibuddin
- Neelam Mehra as Sister Maria of St. Peter Orphanage
- Vijay Kashyap as Ramamurthy Iyer, PT teacher of the children boarding hostel
- Kunika as Dancer (Only in Episode 124)
- Ahmed Khan (actor) as Police Commissioner AK Malhotra
- Harshada Khanvilkar as Secretary of Sumer Rajvansh

== See also ==
- Tiger
