= Thalaivaa =

2013 Indian film by A. L. Vijay

- Theatrical release poster
- Directed by: A. L. Vijay
- Written by: A. L. Vijay; Raj Krishnan; Anil Jain (dialogues)
- Produced by: S. Chandraprakash Jain Renny Johnson
- Starring: Vijay; Sathyaraj; Amala Paul; Santhanam
- Cinematography: Nirav Shah
- Edited by: Anthony
- Music by: G. V. Prakash Kumar
- Production company: Sri Mishri Productions
- Distributed by: Vendhar Movies
- Release date: 9 August 2013
- Running time: 179 minutes
- Country: India
- Language: Tamil
- Budget: ₹60 crore
- Box office: est.₹65 crore

Thalaivaa (transl. The Leader) is a 2013 Indian Tamil-language action thriller film directed by A. L. Vijay (credited as Vijay) and produced by Vendhar Movies. The film stars Vijay in the titular role, alongside Amala Paul, Ragini Nandwani, Sathyaraj, Santhanam, Abhimanyu Singh, Nassar and Rajeev Pillai. In the film, a dancer in Australia takes over his father's duty as a crime boss in Mumbai after his death.

The film, which commenced production in November 2012 in Mumbai, was released on 8 August 2013 on the occasion of Eid-ul Fitr. The film received mostly positive reviews from the critics. The film upon its early release was successful at the overseas box office, and also successful in Andhra Pradesh, Kerala, and Karnataka box office. Due to opposition from the ruling AIADMK as insisted by the then Chief minister J Jayalalithaa, the film had a delayed release in Tamil Nadu on 20 August 2013 and its performance was affected at the Tamil Nadu box office. The film went on to be remade in Punjabi as Sardar Saab in 2017. It was also screened in Japan in 2020.

== Plot ==
1988: At Dharavi, Bombay, following the death of local gang ruler Vethaya, rival gangs go on a rampage, trying to take over. During the riot, Ratnam, a henchman of Vethaya, and his son, Logu, are attacked by an opposition gang. Ramadurai, a migrant dhaba worker from Tirunelveli, arrives and saves them in time. Ramadurai, who also believed in and supported Vethaya, a messiah figure to the poor community, announces Ratnam as the next leader. However, Ratnam decides to leave for Madras and start a new life somewhere abroad. Despite Ramadurai and others urging Ratnam, he is firm in his decision and leaves. Afterwards, the rest of the gang members ask Ramadurai to take the lead. Suddenly, that night, Ramadurai's house gets attacked by the opposite gang, run by a politician named Bhadra. While trying to save him, Ramadurai's wife, Ganga, gets shot and dies suddenly. Enraged, Ramadurai goes to Bhadra's house, beats up Bhadra's goons, and kills Bhadra. Ramadurai takes his son Vishwa to Ratnam, who is on a train, and asks him to take Vishwa with him because he does not want his actions to waste Vishwa's life and sends him away with Ratnam to Australia.

2013: Vishwa is a dancer who lives in Sydney and manages a water distribution business in the name of his mother Ganga with his childhood friend Logu and his dance team members. Meanwhile, Ramadurai now controls Dharavi, while his syndicate also acts as an underground vigilante justice operation across Mumbai, delivering their own “brand of justice” for the helpless and downtrodden who face abuse, corruption, or crimes with no legal remedy. Due to his vigilante actions, he has become a popular and respected figure among the local poor community at Dharavi. He keeps in contact with Vishwa, lying to him about his profession as a businessman. Vishwa falls in love with Meera, the daughter of a restaurateur, who is one of his customers. Meera reciprocates Vishwa's feelings and joins his dance team, helping them win a dance competition. She soon proposes to Vishwa, who agrees. Meera's father accepts the marriage but wants to discuss the matter formally with Ramadurai.

They leave for Mumbai, where Vishwa is surprised to find his father in deep hiding. Vishwa finally meets his father, learning about his true profession, and that the police is after him due to several false cases registered against him by his arch-enemy Bhima Bhai, Bhadra's son. During their conversation, the two are informed that Meera and her father are on their way back to Sydney because her father disapproves of Ramadurai's illegal profession. Ramadurai and Vishwa go to their hotel, where Ramadurai tries to convince Meera's father that Vishwa had nothing to do with anything. However, he is soon surrounded by police, including Meera and her father, revealing they are both Crime Branch officers who lured Vishwa to Mumbai so that they could reach Ramadurai. Ramadurai gets arrested, but just after he enters the police van, a bomb planted by Bhima in the vehicle explodes, killing him. Distraught over his father's death, Vishwa decides to stay back in Mumbai and take over his father's syndicate, despite his uncle's constant urging for him to go back and continue his life in Sydney. He dons the title of Thalaivaa and provides his brand of justice for the helpless and downtrodden.

Meanwhile, Bhima initiates a riot in Mumbai, which leads to the deaths and injuries of several people. Vishwa arrives at the scene and saves several others, including a Bhojpuri woman named Gowri, whose marriage became nullified due to the riots. Although there is seemingly insufficient evidence that Bhima is responsible, a video recorded by a cameraman, Kumar, highlighting Bhima's involvement in the riots, is stolen by a Bhojpuri-speaking pickpocketer. Vishwa and his gang manage to reclaim the tape from the pickpocketer and make it public, leading to Bhima's arrest. Vishwa also kills the corrupt CM of Maharashtra, who had given Bhima and his gang free rein, and blames Bhima.

However, Bhima soon escapes from prison and kills most of Vishwa's henchmen on the night of Maha Shivaratri, including Gowri. When Vishwa enters a fort after hearing that his uncle Rangaa and his second-in-command are being "held hostage" there by Bhima, Ranga stabs him. It is revealed that Ranga helped Bhima kill Gowri and Vishwa's henchmen. Taking his son, who is also Vishwa's cousin and driver, he leaves the fort. He immediately informs the police that Vishwa is "dead". Ranga also reveals that he aided Bhima in killing Ramadurai to replace him as the leader. When Ranga's son hears about his father's betrayal, he becomes enraged and drives the car into a petroleum tanker, killing them both.

Though injured, Vishwa fights Bhima's goons and kills them. After a bitter fight, he kills Bhima by stabbing his throat. Meera soon arrives at the fort and realises that Vishwa killed Bhima, but she acts quickly and shoots the corpses of Bhima and his goons to imply that she killed them, thus saving Vishwa from prison. Meera eventually quits her job after realising her love for Vishwa, and the two get married. With Bhima and his gang out of the way, Vishwa is now the unchallenged crime boss in Mumbai.

== Cast ==
- Vijay as Vishwa Ramadurai (Thalaivaa) alias Vishwa Bhai
- Sathyaraj as Ramadurai (Anna), Vishwa's father
- Amala Paul as ACP Meera Narayanan IPS
- Ragini Nandwani as Gowri Mohan
- Santhanam as Logu, Vishwa's best friend and Ratnam's son
- Abhimanyu Singh as Bhima Bhai, main antagonist
- Nassar as Ratnam, Logu's father
- Rajiv Pillai as Raju, Anna's henchman
- N. L. Srinivasan as Anand, Anna's henchman
- Udhaya as Video Kumar
- Tanu Vidyarthi as Video Kumar's wife
- Ponvannan as Ranga, Anna's brother, Vishwa's uncle and second antagonist
- M. R. Kishore Kumar as Santhosh, Ranga's son and Vishwa's cousin
- Rekha as Ganga Ramadurai (Guest Appearance), Vishwa's mother
- Suresh as Crime Branch officer who acts as Meera's father
- Y. G. Mahendran as Lawyer Radhakrishnan
- Manobala as Sathish, Anna's assistant
- Subbu Panchu as Ravi Kiran
- Mathivanan Sakthivel as Dr. Krishnaswamy
- Ravi Prakash as Kesav
- Varun as Vishwa's friend
- Sathish Krishnan as Vishwa's friend
- K. Bujji Babu as Chef Thodaikari Maarthandam
- Prabhu as Vishwa's friend
- Pooran Kiri as Jadhav
- Raj Arjun as Bhima's henchman
- Ranjeev Verma as Mumbai Police Inspector
- Japan Kumar as Japan
- Nishikant Dixit as Advocate
- Vijay Varma as one of Vishwa's friends and a dancer in Tamil Pasanga
- Stunt Silva in a special appearance as himself
- Sam Anderson as himself (cameo appearance)
- G. V. Prakash Kumar (special appearance in the song "Vaanganna Vanakkanganna")
- Sridhar (special appearance in the song "Tamil Pasanga")
- Dinesh (special appearance in the song "Vaanganna Vanakkanganna")

== Production ==
=== Casting ===
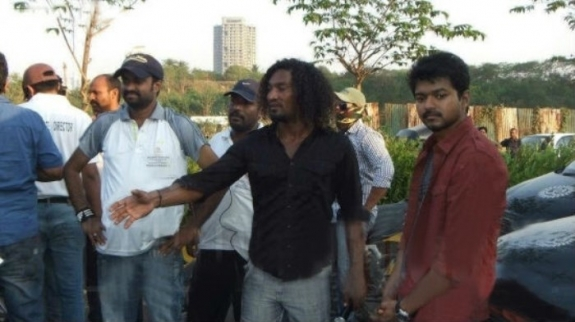
Vijay on the sets of Thalaivaa with stunt choreographers

After watching A. L. Vijay's period drama film Madrasapattinam (2010), Vijay was impressed by the film and contacted the film director for a new project. A. L. Vijay later narrated the Thalaivaa story to Vijay and he agreed to play the role within 15 minutes. Samantha Ruth Prabhu, Priya Anand, and Yami Gautam were initially considered for the lead female role. Later Amala Paul with TV actress Ragini Nandwani was selected as the main female leads. Vijay Yesudas was reported to be finalized for the antagonist role in this film, but he denied it as rumour. Sathyaraj was also selected to be a part of this film. A. L. Vijay's brother Udhaya has been selected to feature in a prominent role. G. V. Prakash Kumar will be the music director, while Nirav Shah will crank the camera. R. K. Naguraj has been enrolled as art director. Rumors about a Hollywood star portraying a singer, were refuted by Vijay.

=== Filming ===
The muhurta of the film was held in Chennai on 16 November 2012. The first schedule began in Mumbai from 23 November 2012. The title song "Thalaivaa Thalaivaa" was shot in Mumbai with 500 junior artists. A major portion of the film was shot in Australia. The first look and title was revealed on 14 January 2013. Additional posters were released on 26 January 2013.

As of 8 February 2013, 50% of total shootings were completed, with stunt scenes conducted by Stunt Silva. Ragini Nandwani, who plays a North Indian, stated that all of her film sequences were shot in Mumbai over 25–30 days. They moved to Chennai and shot a song at Binny Mills. A last shooting schedule in Australia was completed by 24 April. They shot scenes at the Bondi Beach in New South Wales. It was revealed that Vijay would portray a leader of a dance group based in Australia, performing dance styles of different genres including tap dancing with Sathish Krishnan (June Ponal from Unnale Unnale song fame), Karthik (Ungalil yaar Prabhu Deva winner), and their dance schoolmates.

== Soundtrack ==
Thalaivaa

Soundtrack album by G. V. Prakash Kumar
- Released: 21 June 2013
- Genre: Feature film soundtrack
- Length: 31:25
- Language: Tamil
- Label: Sony Music
- Producer: G. V. Prakash Kumar

G. V. Prakash Kumar chronology
Udhayam NH4 (2013)	Thalaivaa (2013)	Raja Rani (2013)

The soundtrack was composed by G. V. Prakash Kumar with lyrics by Na. Muthukumar, both teaming with A. L. Vijay for the fifth time. The soundtrack features five songs and two theme music tracks. As of 21 November 2012, he had composed two songs for the film. One song had been sung by Vijay alongside Santhanam. A third song was completed on 11 February 2013. The audio launch took place on 21 June 2013 in Hotel Connemara. The audio rights of Thalaivaa were bought by Sony Music.

All lyrics are written by Na. Muthukumar.

Track listing
No.	Title	Singer(s)	Length
1.	"Tamil Pasanga"	Benny Dayal, Sheezay.Psycho Unit	5:06
2.	"Yaar Indha Saalai Oram"	G. V. Prakash Kumar, Saindhavi	5:12
3.	"Vaanganna Vanakkanganna"	Vijay, Santhanam, M. M. Manasi (Uncredited)	5:31
4.	"Sol Sol"	Vijay Prakash, Abhay Jodhpurkar, Megha, Harini	5:46
5.	"The Ecstacy of Dance"	Kiran, Chennai Symphony	2:08
6.	"Thalapathy Thalapathy"	Haricharan, Pooja Vaidyanath, Zia Ulhaq	5:36
7.	"Thalaivaa Theme"	G. V. Prakash Kumar	2:46
Total length:			31:25

== Release ==
Thalaivaa distribution rights for the United States and Canada were bought by Bharat Creations. Ayngaran International acquired the overseas rights for Thalaivaa Tamil Nadu rights were bought by Vendhar Movies and Kerala rights by Thameens via Vendhar Movies. The music rights were sold to Sony Music. Prior to Vijay's birthday on 21 June a theatrical film trailer was released by Sony Music India on their YouTube channel. Trailer got 1.2 million in 32 hours and 2 million views within 2 days on YouTube after its release. The film garnered totally 3.4 million hits on YouTube. The satellite rights of the film were secured by Sun TV for a record sum of ₹15 crore (US$1.6 million). The film's running length is 3 hours 2 minutes and was given a "U" certificate by the Indian Censor Board. The film has been released on Friday, 9 August 2013 worldwide.

== Reception ==
=== Box office ===
Thalaivaa earned ₹63.50 crore in India and ₹13.46 crore overseas, for a worldwide total of ₹76.96 crore.

Thalaivaa opened well at international markets, especially in the US and UK. In UK From the paid previews on Thursday till Saturday, Thalaivaa's gross in the UK is ₹78 lakh (US$81,000) approximate from 34 locations and it is seen as a very impressive opening. Vijay's films generally embark on a great start in the UK, and Thalaivaa is no exception. The film's UK collection is said to be ₹1.14 crore (US$120,000) in its opening weekend. In UK "Thalaivaa" made an impressive start earning ₹1.14 crore (US$120,000) (£1,21,249) from 36 screens in the opening weekend. The film has made higher collections than Suriya's "Singam 2" in the UK. "Singam 2" earned around ₹99 lakh (US$100,000) in the first week of its release. But Vijay's "Thalaivaa" crossed "Singam 2" collections in its debut weekend. The film continued its dream run at the UK box office even in its second weekend. Its total UK collections are now pegged at ₹2.09 crore (US$220,000).

At the end of the first weekend, the US gross of Thalaivaa from 44 reported locations is US$212,000 ₹1.29 crore (US$130,000). A record total of 70 locations are screening Thalaivaa and the total gross for the first weekend is expected to be in the US$250,000 range Thalaivaa fared well in Malaysia too. Thalaivaa has maintained exceptionally well in its second weekend in Malaysia. The film has become ninth highest grosser of all time in Malaysia's box office in just 10 days collection. In its second weekend the film has collected ₹1.14 crore (US$120,000) (MYR 579,153) on 60 screens and average working out per screens ₹1.90 lakh (US$2,000) (MYR 9,654). Thalaivaa collected around ₹8.34 crore (US$870,000) in just 10 days at the Malaysian box office. Baradwaj Rangan of the Hindu wrote "The director gets a lot of things right...this film has been made with some integrity, with respect for the story being told (and, to some extent, the audience too). After Vishwa's transformation, he's rarely shown smiling. Even when Santhanam makes a re-entry, there is no joyous reunion. Even after the heroine is separated from the hero for a while, there are no "dream songs". "

=== Critical response ===
IBN Live gave it a 3/5 rating, stating that the film is a full-baked product. Sify stated, "On the whole, Thalaivaa likes the curate’s egg is good in parts and would have been better if it was more racy and shorter." The Times of India gave it a 3/5, stating, "Vijay is in top form when he's normal and menacing. Sathyaraj as the don is effective. But the one who makes this arduous journey enjoyable is Santhanam, whose poker-faced humour provides relief in a largely grim story." MovieCrow gave the film a 2.5/5 rating, praising Vijay's performance and the first half but criticizing the second half. Ananda Vikatan rated the film 42 out of 100.

=== Accolades ===
Award	Category	Recipient	Result
Vijay Awards	Favourite Hero	Vijay	Won
Vijay Awards	Entertainer of the Year	Vijay	Won
Vijay Awards	Favourite Film	Thalaivaa	Won
Techofes Awards	Favourite Actor	Vijay	Won
