= Doosri Dulhan =

1983 film by Lekh Tandon

- Poster
- Directed by: Lekh Tandon
- Written by: Anil Barve
- Produced by: Dharampal Gupta; Arun Kumar Gupta
- Starring: Victor Banerjee; Sharmila Tagore; Shabana Azmi
- Cinematography: Pravin Bhatt; Jehangir Choudhary
- Edited by: B.Mangeshkar
- Release date: 14 October 1983
- Running time: 2 hours 33 min
- Country: India
- Language: Hindi

Doosri Dulhan (transl. Second bride) is a 1983 Bollywood film directed by Lekh Tandon. It stars Victor Banerjee, Sharmila Tagore, Shabana Azmi in lead roles. The music of the film was composed by Bappi Lahiri.

== Plot ==
The film tells the story of a childless couple Anil & Renu (Victor Banerjee & Sharmila Tagore respectively) and a prostitute Chanda (Shabana Azmi), who is hired as a surrogate mother. The couple were childless after Renu's miscarriage and so hired a woman to be their child's surrogate mother. However, after the child Munna was born, Chanda refused to let go of him. Renu allows Chanda to take Munna against Anil's will. After a few days, Chanda realizes that she can't raise Munna alone and that he will have a better life at his father's home. Chanda hands Munna over to Renu and becomes a religious singer.

== Adaptations ==
The movie was released in Bengali under the name Uttarayan in 2006. The 2001 Hindi film Chori Chori Chupke Chupke follows a similar plotline and has been compared with the film.

== Soundtrack ==
The film's music was composed by Bappi Lahiri and the lyrics were penned by Amit Khanna.

Song	Singer
"Lamha Lamha Faasle"	Kishore Kumar
"Mera Saiyan"	Asha Bhosle
"Khila Khila Mukhda" – 1	Asha Bhosle
"Khila Khila Mukhda" – 2	Asha Bhosle
"Khel Khel Kar Kulel Nandaji Ka Lala" (Duet) – 1	Asha Bhosle, Bappi Lahiri
"Khel Khel Kar Kulel Nandaji Ka Lala" (Duet) – 2	Asha Bhosle, Bappi Lahiri
"Khel Khel Kar Kulel Nandaji Ka Lala" (Solo)	Bappi Lahiri
"Yeh Kis Bandhan Mein"	Bhupinder Singh
