= Ravindra Singh (producer) =

Indian film producer and director

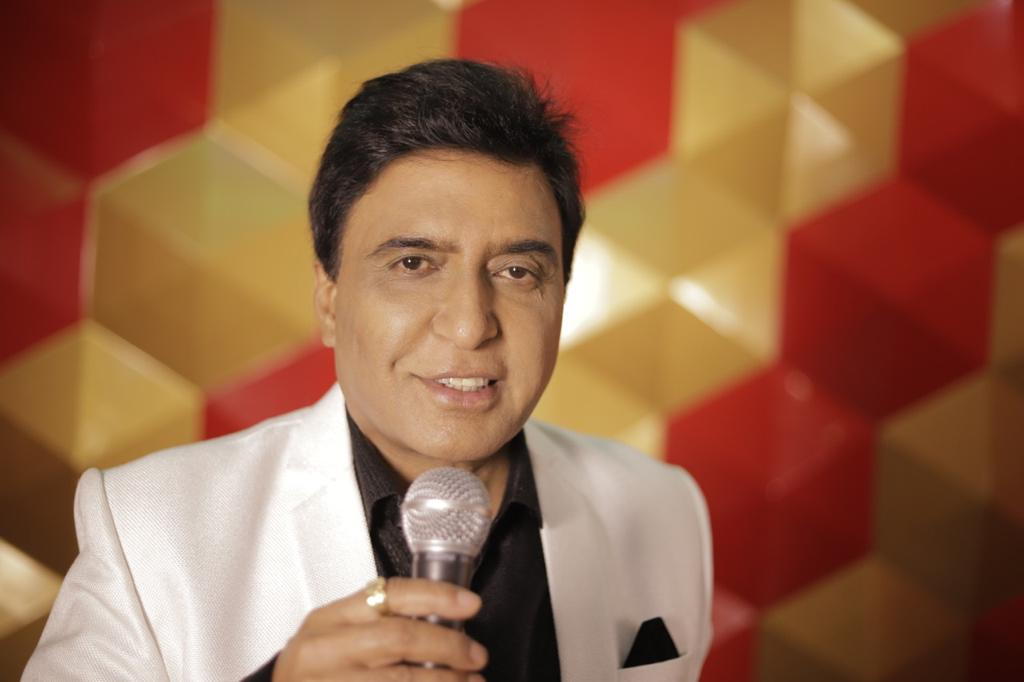
- Education: University of Delhi
- Occupations: Producer; singer
- Years active: 1996–present

Ravindra Singh is an Indian producer and singer. His work as a producer includes Nakshatra (2010), Pappu Can't Dance Saala (2011), I Am 24 (2012), In Rahon Se (2016) and Udanchhoo (2018).

== Career ==
=== As a producer ===
He made his debut as a producer in 1997 with the album "Dil Deewana" featuring artist like Kumar Sanu, Udit Narayan, and Shankar Mahadevan. He debuted as a film producer with film Kabhi Kahin. Later he produced films like Pappu Can't Dance Saala, Nakshtra, Udanchhoo, In Raahon Se and I Am 24.

=== As a singer ===
Singh started singing with a song Swachh Bharat Abhiyaan dedicated to Swachh Bharat Mission. After this he released songs like Aankhon Ki Nami, Dhatt Teri Ki, DJ Ban, Jugaad, Maan ja and Haaye Tota.

== Filmography ==
| Year | Title | Cast | Notes |
|---|---|---|---|
| 2008 | Kabhi Kahin | Asmit Patel, Tulip Joshi | |
| 2010 | Pappu Can't Dance Saala | Vinay Pathak, Neha Dhupia | |
| 2010 | Nakshtra | Shubh Mukherjee, Sabina Sheema | |
| 2010 | I am 24 | Rajat Kapoor, Ranvir Shorey | |
| 2016 | In Rahon Se | | |
| 2018 | Udanchhoo | Prem Chopra, Rajneesh Duggal, Ashutosh Rana | |
