= Amanda Rosario =

British actress

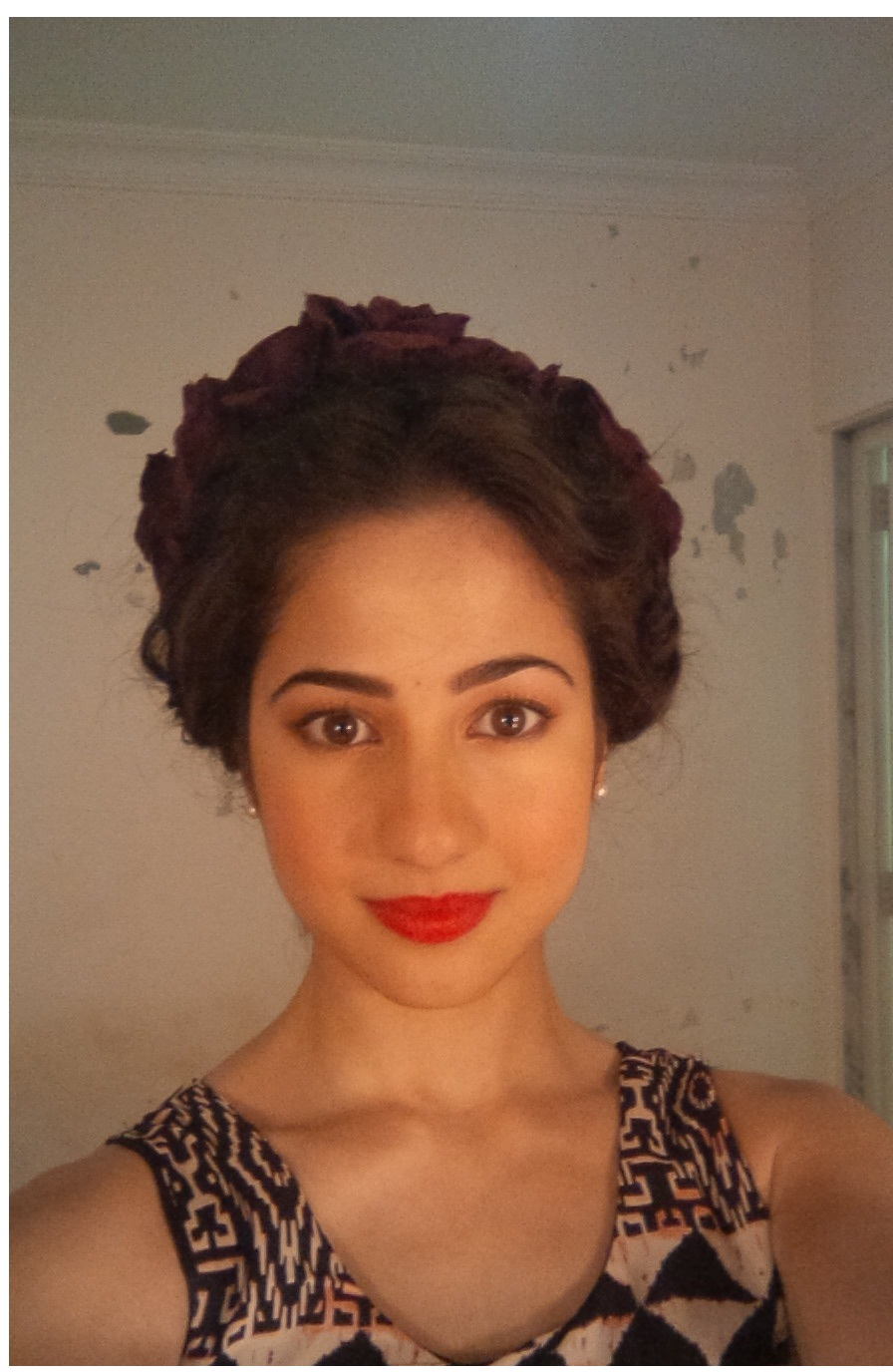
- Born: Amanda Pegrum; Ilford, London, England
- Education: Lucy Cavendish College, Cambridge
- Occupations: Actress, Writer, Dancer
- Years active: 2009-present

Amanda Rosario (born Amanda Pegrum) is a British actress who has appeared in Hindi films as well as Tamil and Marathi films. After appearing in small roles in Hindi films, Rosario made her debut as a lead actress with the Tamil film, Saagasam (2016), starring alongside Prashanth.

== Career ==
Born in Ilford, London to an English father and an Indian mother, she attended non-selective state school Beal High School where she obtained 11A* GCSEs. Rosario chose to enrol at The Centre for Performing Arts College in 2006 after becoming interested in dance and acting. Rosario began a career in performing arts by working as a dance teacher at Arts Educational Schools, London in 2008, before moving on to work as a model in commercial assignments. She subsequently represented brands including Perfect Asian and Pizza Hut, while also working on television commercials for Heart FM and ITV's Magic Numbers. Rosario made her acting debut by portraying a supporting role as Deepika Padukone's friend in Love Aaj Kal (2009), before working as a choreographer for the BBC Asian Network and as a freelance dancer for shows.

In 2013, Rosario appeared in an item number alongside Akshay Kumar in the Hindi gangster film, Once Upon ay Time in Mumbai Dobaara! (2013). In 2015, she worked as the lead actress in the Tamil film Saagasam (2016) and shot for the film in India, Malaysia and Japan. The team had initially kept her identity secret, before introducing her at a press conference during April 2015. Featuring alongside actor Prashanth, Saagasam opened to mixed reviews in February 2016.

In 2017, Rosario appeared in an item number alongside Rajneesh Duggal and Prem Chopra in the Hindi comedy film, Udanchhoo (2018).

Rosario later chose to continue her education and read Creative Writing and English at Birkbeck University of London graduating with first-class honours, before taking on a master's degree at the University of Cambridge in Writing for Performance.

== Filmography ==
Year	Title	Role	Language	Notes
2009	Love Aaj Kal	Amanda	Hindi	
2013	Once Upon ay Time in Mumbai Dobaara!	Belly dancer	Hindi	Special appearance in song "Tu Hi Khwahish"
2013	Grand Masti	Dancer	Hindi	Special appearance in song
2016	Saagasam	Madhu	Tamil	
2017	Udanchhoo	Dancer	Hindi	Special appearance in song "Gir Jaaye Sarkar"
2017	Bhikari	Dancer	Marathi	Special appearance in song
2018	Kaalakaandi	Selina	Hindi	
2019	Fraud Saiyaan	Dancer	Hindi	Special appearance in song "Ladies Paan"
