= Rajesh Khattar =

Indian actor, voice actor and screenwriter (born 1966)

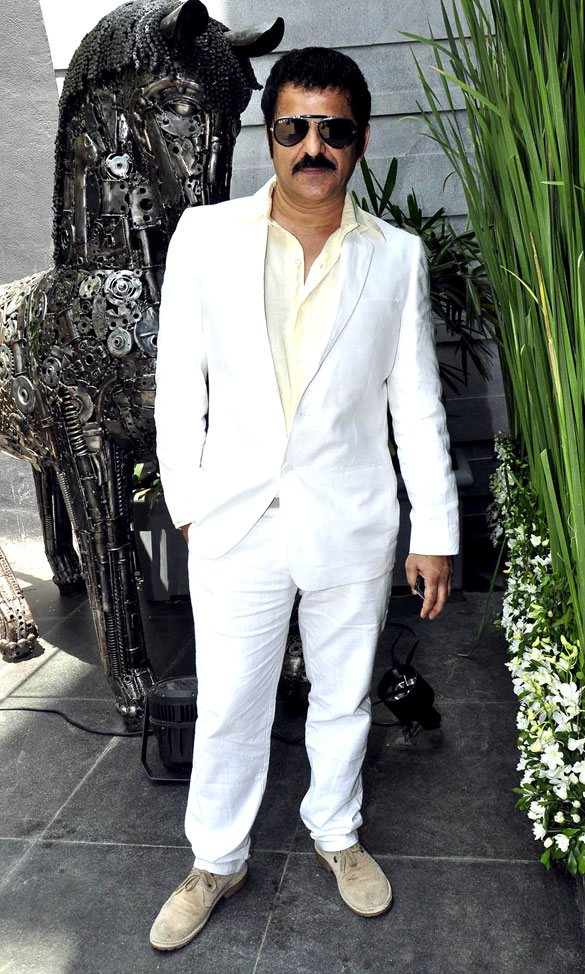
- Born: 24 September 1966 (age 59)
- Occupations: Actor; voice artist; screenwriter
- Years active: 1992–present
- Spouse(s): Neelima Azeem (m. 1990; div. 2001) Vandana Sajnani (m. 2008)
- Children: 2; including Ishaan Khatter

Rajesh Khattar (born 24 September 1966) is an Indian actor, voice artist and screenwriter who works in Hindi films. He was married to Neelima Azeem and is the father of actor Ishaan Khattar and step father of Shahid Kapoor.

== Personal life ==
Khattar was born on 24 September 1966. He was married to actress Neelima Azeem, former wife of actor Pankaj Kapur and mother to actor Shahid Kapoor. They have a son, Ishaan Khatter, who is an actor. Khattar and Azeem got divorced in the year 2001. Khattar married Vandana Sajnani in 2008. Their first child, a boy, Yuvaan Vanraj Khattar, was born in June 2019 after 11 years of marriage.

== Career ==
As a film actor, Khattar worked in Hindi films like Don, Don 2, Khiladi 786, Race 2, the Satish Kaushik-directed Gang of Ghosts, Manjunath Traffic & many others. Khattar also appeared in English and other language TV series and TV films such as German movie Gift (2017) directed by Daniel Harrich.

Khattar returned to television after 8 years with Beyhadh as Ashwin Mehrotra on Sony TV, followed by Kya Qusoor Hai Amala Ka? as Rishaan Malik on Star Plus. He also featured in Vikram Bhatt's Spotlight on Viu. In 2018, Khattar portrayed the role of Harshvardhan Hooda in Colors TV's Bepannah.

=== Dubbing career ===
Khattar has dubbed for numerous Hollywood actors including Tom Hanks, Johnny Depp, Jack Black, Robert Downey Jr., Dominic West, Nicolas Cage, Lambert Wilson and Michael Fassbender. He has been the official Hindi voice of MCU's Tony Stark/Iron Man play by Robert Downey Jr.

== Filmography ==
=== Films ===
Year	Film title	Role	Notes
1992	Nagin Aur Lootere	Inspector Nagesh/Rajnikant	
1993	Aaina	Sunil	
1999	Sooryavansham	Heera's brother	
2003	Fun 2shh: Dudes in the 10th Century	—N/a	Screenwriter
2006	Don: The Chase Begins Again	Sanjeev Singhania	
2007	The Train: Some Lines Shoulder Never Be Crossed	Roma's friend	
2009	Jai Veeru: Friends Forever	CBI officer	
2009	Radio: Love on Air	RJ Vivan Shah's Boss	Hindi, Punjabi film
2010	Prince	Sherry	
2010	Chase	DIG Ranveer Tyagi	
2010	Hello Darling	Boss	
2011	Kaccha Limboo	a family friend	
2011	Men Will Be Men	Special Appearance	
2011	Damadamm!	Rajan Mehra	
2011	Don 2	Sanjeev Singhania	Archive footage
2012	Ek Main Aur Ekk Tu	Mr. Shah	
2012	Diary of a Butterfly	Xavier	
2012	Rakhtbeej	Dabral	
2012	Khiladi 786	Inspector Jugnu Singh	
2013	Race 2	Vikram Thapar	
2014	Manjunath	Raina	
2014	Action Jackson	Member in the meeting	
2014	Objection My God	Not Known	
2015	Ranviir The Marshal	Rana	
2016	Traffic	Dr. Jagdish Khattar	
2019	Chanakya	Ibrahim Qureshi	Telugu film
2020	Shukranu	Bhisham	on ZEE5
2025	Romeo S3	D'Mello	
2025	Ajey: The Untold Story of a Yogi	Mushtaq Ahmed	
TBA	3 Monkeys †		

=== Television ===
Year	Show	Character	Language	Notes
1989	Phir Wahi Talash	Captain Salim	Hindi	TV series on Doordarshan
1993	Junoon	ACP Wajahad Ali	Hindi	TV series on Doordarshan
1995	Aahat	Vinod	Hindi	TV series on Sony TV
2006-2008	Left Right Left	Lala Gehlot	Hindi	TV series on SAB TV
2007	Kumkum – Ek Pyara Sa Bandhan	Kishan Katara	Hindi	TV series on Star Plus; Won 'Best Actor in negative role' at Indian Television Academy Awards 2007
2008	Sharpe's Peril	Subedar Pillai	English	TV movie on ITV, UTV
2008	Sapna Babul Ka...Bidaai	Bittu	Hindi	TV series on Star Plus
2016-2017	Beyhadh	Ashwin Mehrotra	Hindi	TV show on Sony TV
2017	Gift	Aagam Nayar	German	TV movie
2017	Kya Qusoor Hai Amala Ka?	Rishan Malik	Hindi	TV show on Star Plus
2017	Spotlight	Ranjit Thakur	Hindi	Web Series by Vikram Bhatt on Viu
2018	Bepannaah	Harshvardhan Hooda	Hindi	TV show on Colors TV
2018	Crime Patrol (TV series)		Hindi	TV show on Sony TV
2022	The Casino	Mayor	Hindi	Web series on ZEE5
2022	Duranga	Dr. Manohar Patel	Hindi	Web series on ZEE5
2023	Kaala Paani	Saurabh Wani	Hindi	Web series on Netflix
2024	Murder In Mahim	Leslie	Hindi	Web series on JioCinema
2024	Baahubali: Crown of Blood	Rakhtdeva	Hindi	Animated series on Disney+ Hotstar

== Dubbing credits ==
=== Live action films ===
==== Indian films ====
Year	Film title	Actor	Character	Dub Language	Original Language	Dub Year Release	Notes
2008	Phoonk	Sudeepa	Rajiv	Hindi		2008	
2008	Ghajini	Riyaz Khan	Inspector Arjun Yadav	Hindi		2008	
2010	Phoonk 2	Sudeepa	Rajiv	Hindi		2010	
2010	Kedi	Nagarjuna	Ramesh alias Rummy	Hindi	Telugu	2011	The Hindi dub was re-titled: Gambler No. 1.
2011	Gaganam	Nagarjuna	Major N. Ravindra	Hindi	Telugu	2012	The Hindi dub was re-titled: Mere Hindustan Ki Kasam.
2012	Cameraman Gangatho Rambabu	Pawan Kalyan	Rambabu	Hindi	Telugu	2015	The Hindi dub was re-titled: Mera Target.
2013	Alex Pandian	Karthi	Alex Pandian	Hindi	Tamil	2013	
2015	10 Endrathukulla	Vikram	Anonymous driver	Hindi	Tamil	2016	The Hindi dub was re-titled: 10 Ka Dum.
2019	Sye Raa Narasimha Reddy	Chiranjeevi	Uyyalawada Narasimha Reddy	Hindi	Telugu	2019	
2019	Asuran	Aadukalam Naren	Vaddakuran Narasimhan	Hindi	Tamil	2021	
2021	Pushpa: The Rise	Fahadh Faasil	Bhanwar Singh Shekhawat IPS	Hindi	Telugu	2021	
2022	Ponniyin Selvan: I	Vikram	Adithya Karikalan	Hindi	Tamil	2022	
2023	Ponniyin Selvan: II	Vikram	Adithya Karikalan	Hindi	Tamil	2023	
2023	Varisu	Meka Srikanth	Jai Rajendran	Hindi	Tamil	2023	
2024	Saindhav	Venkatesh Daggubati	Saindhav Koneru "SaiKo"	Hindi	Telugu	2024	
2024	Pushpa 2: The Rule	Fahadh Faasil	Bhanwar Singh Shekhawat IPS	Hindi	Telugu	2024	
2025	Good Bad Ugly	Ajith Kumar	AK	Hindi	Tamil	2025	The Hindi dub was direct to Netflix.

==== Foreign language films ====
Film title	Actor	Character	Dub Language	Original Language	Original Year Release	Dub Year Release	Notes
Terminator 2: Judgment Day	Joe Morton	Miles Bennett Dyson	Hindi	English	1991	2004	
Home Alone 3	Olek Krupa	Peter Beaupre	Hindi	English	1997		
The Legend of Zorro	Antonio Banderas	Alejandro Murrieta / Zorro	Hindi	English; Spanish	2005	2005	Ninad Kamat dubbed this character in The Mask of Zorro
The Bone Collector	Gary Swanson	Alan Rubin	Hindi	English	1999	2010	
Hellboy	Doug Jones	Abe Sapien	Hindi	English	2004	2004	
The Mummy	Oded Fehr Corey Johnson	Ardeth Bay American expedition Narrator	Hindi	English	1999	1999	
Romeo Must Die	Jet Lee	Barber	Hindi	English	2000	2000	The Hindi dub is titled: Inteqaam Ki Aag.
Shaft	Samuel L. Jackson	John Shaft II	Hindi	English	2000	2000	
Swordfish	Hugh Jackman	Stanley Jobson	Hindi	English	2001	2001	
Belphegor, Phantom of the Louvre	Lionel Abelanski	Simmonet	Hindi	French	2001	2001	
Ocean's Eleven	Andy García	Terry Benedict	Hindi	English	2001	2001	
The One	Jason Statham	MVA Agent Evan Funsch	Hindi	English	2001	2001	
Evolution	Ted Levine	Brigadier General Russell Woodman	Hindi	English	2001	2001	
The Lord of the Rings: The Fellowship of the Ring	Unknown actor	Unknown character	Hindi	English	2001	2002	
The Lord of the Rings: The Two Towers	Unknown actor	Unknown character	Hindi	English	2002	2003	
The Lord of the Rings: The Return of the King	Unknown actor	Unknown character	Hindi	English	2003	2004	
The Hobbit: An Unexpected Journey	Unknown actor	Unknown character	Hindi	English	2012	2012	
The Hobbit: The Desolation of Smaug	Unknown actor	Unknown character	Hindi	English	2013	2013	
The Guru	Michael McKean	Dwain	Hindi	English	2002	2002	
Men in Black II	Johnny Knoxville	Scrad & Charlie	Hindi	English	2002	2002	
The Rundown	Dwayne Johnson	Beck	Hindi	English	2003	2003	
X2	Alan Cumming	Kurt; Wagner / Nightcrawler	Hindi	English	2003	2003	
X-Men: First Class	Michael Fassbender	Erik Lensherr / Magneto	Hindi	English; German; Russian; French	2011	2011	
X-Men: Days of Future Past	Michael Fassbender	Young Erik Lensherr / Magneto	Hindi	English; German; Russian; French	2014	2014	
Lara Croft Tomb Raider: The Cradle of Life	Gerard Butler	Terry Sheridan	Hindi	English	2003	2003	
Charlie's Angels: Full Throttle	Justin Theroux	Seamus O'Grady	Hindi	English	2003	2003	The original Hindi dub has also aired on Sony Max.
The League of Extraordinary Gentlemen	Naseeruddin Shah	Captain Nemo	Hindi	English	2003	2003	
Timeline	Lambert Wilson	Lord Arnaut	Hindi	English	2003	2003	
Shanghai Knights	Thomas Fisher	Artie Doyle	Hindi	English	2003	2003	
Pirates of the Caribbean: Curse of the Black Pearl	Johnny Depp	Captain Jack Sparrow	Hindi	English	2003	2003	For the Indian audience these movies are renamed in Hindi as Samander Ke Lootere.
Pirates of the Caribbean: Dead Man's Chest	Johnny Depp	Captain Jack Sparrow	Hindi	English	2006	2006	For the Indian audience these movies are renamed in Hindi as Samander Ke Lootere.
Pirates of the Caribbean: At World's End	Johnny Depp	Captain Jack Sparrow	Hindi	English	2007	2007	For the Indian audience these movies are renamed in Hindi as Samander Ke Lootere.
Pirates of the Caribbean: On Stranger Tides	Johnny Depp	Captain Jack Sparrow	Hindi	English	2011	2011	Hindi dubbed version is renamed in Hindi as Samander Ke Lootere: Ek Anjaan Rahasya
The Matrix Reloaded	Lambert Wilson	The Merovingian	Hindi	English	2003	2003	
The Matrix Revolutions	Lambert Wilson	The Merovingian	Hindi	English	2003	2003	
Van Helsing	Hugh Jackman	Gabriel Van Helsing	Hindi	English	2004	2004	
Catwoman	Lambert Wilson	Georges Hedare	Hindi	English	2004	2004	
Walking Tall	Dwayne Johnson	Christopher "Chris" Vaughn, Jr.	Hindi	English	2004	2004	
Spider-Man 2	Dylan Baker	Dr. Curt Connors	Hindi	English	2004	2004	
Alien vs. Predator	Raoul Bova	Sebastian De Rosa	Hindi	English	2004	2004	
King Kong	Jack Black	Carl Denham	Hindi	English	2005	2005	
The Wicker Man	Nicolas Cage	Edward Malus	Hindi	English	2006	2006	
300	David Wenham	Dilios; Narration	Hindi	English	2007	2007	
300: Rise of an Empire	David Wenham	Dilios	Hindi	English	2014	2014	
National Treasure 2	Nicolas Cage	Benjamin Franklin "Ben" Gates	Hindi	English	2007	2007	
Iron Man	Robert Downey Jr.	Tony Stark / Iron Man	Hindi	English	2008	2008	
The Incredible Hulk	Robert Downey Jr.	Tony Stark / Iron Man (uncredited cameo)	Hindi	English	2008	2008	
Iron Man 2	Robert Downey Jr.	Tony Stark / Iron Man	Hindi	English	2010	2010	
Iron Man 3	Robert Downey Jr.	Tony Stark / Iron Man	Hindi	English	2013	2013	
Get Smart	Dwayne Johnson	Agent 23	Hindi	English	2008	2008	
Tooth Fairy	Dwayne Johnson	Derek Thompson / Tooth Fairy	Hindi	English	2010	2010	
Gulliver's Travels	Jack Black	Lemuel Gulliver	Hindi	English	2010	2010	
Ghost Rider	Nicolas Cage	Johnny Blaze / Ghost Rider	Hindi	English	2007	2007	
Ghost Rider: Spirit of Vengeance	Nicolas Cage	Johnny Blaze / Ghost Rider	Hindi	English	2012	2012	
Prince of Persia: The Sands of Time	Richard Coyle	Tus Narrator	Hindi	English	2010	2010	
2012	John Cusack	Jackson Curtis	Hindi	English	2009	2009	
The Da Vinci Code	Tom Hanks	Robert Langdon	Hindi	English; French	2006	2006	
Angels & Demons	Tom Hanks	Robert Langdon	Hindi	English; Italian; Latin; German; Swiss German; French; Spanish; Polish	2009	2009	
Casino Royale	Mads Mikkelsen	Le Chiffre	Hindi	English	2006	2006	
Skyfall	Ralph Fiennes	Gareth Mallory / M	Hindi	English	2012	2012	Rajesh's name was mentioned on the Hindi dub credits of the DVD release of the film, also containing the Tamil, Telugu, Russian and Ukrainian credits.
Beowulf	Ray Winstone	Beowulf	Hindi	English	2007	2007	
Transformers	John Turturro	Agent Simmons	Hindi	English	2007	2007	
Transformers: Revenge of the Fallen	John Turturro	Agent Simmons	Hindi	English	2009	2009	
Transformers: Dark of the Moon	John Turturro	Agent Simmons	Hindi	English	2011	2011	
Shoot 'Em Up	Clive Owen	Mr. Smith	Hindi	English	2007	2007	
Sex and the City	Chris Noth	John James "Mr. Big" Preston	Hindi	English	2008	2008	
Sex and the City 2	Chris Noth	John James "Mr. Big" Preston	Hindi	English	2010	2010	
The Taking of Pelham 123	John Turturro	Camonetti	Hindi	English	2009	2009	
The Tourist	Johnny Depp	Frank Tupelo / Alexander Pearce	Hindi	English	2010	2010	
Kick-Ass	Nicolas Cage	Damon Macready / Big Daddy	Hindi	English	2010	2011	
Johnny English Reborn	Dominic West	Simon Ambrose	Hindi	English	2011	2011	
John Carter	Dominic West	Sab Than	Hindi	English	2012	2012	
The Avengers	Robert Downey Jr.	Tony Stark / Iron Man	Hindi	English	2012	2012	
The Dark Knight Rises	Ben Mendelsohn	John Daggett	Hindi	English	2012	2012	
The Amazing Spider-Man	Irrfan Khan	Dr. Rajit Ratha	Hindi	English	2012	2012	
Prometheus	Michael Fassbender	David 8	Hindi	English	2012	2012	
Resident Evil	James Purefoy	Spence Parks	Hindi	English	2002	2002	
Avengers: Age of Ultron	Robert Downey Jr.	Tony Stark / Iron Man	Hindi	English	2015	2015	
Kingsman: The Secret Service	Colin Firth	Harry Hart / Galahad	Hindi	English	2014	2014	
Goosebumps	Jack Black	R.L. Stine	Hindi	English	2015	2015	
Captain America: Civil War	Robert Downey Jr.	Tony Stark / Iron Man	Hindi	English	2016	2016	
The Jungle Book	Giancarlo Esposito	Akela (voice)	Hindi	English	2016	2016	
Spider-Man: Homecoming	Robert Downey Jr.	Tony Stark / Iron Man	Hindi	English	2017	2017	
Avengers: Infinity War	Robert Downey Jr.	Tony Stark / Iron Man	Hindi	English	2018	2018	
Avengers: Endgame	Robert Downey Jr.	Tony Stark / Iron Man	Hindi	English	2019	2019	
Hobbs & Shaw	Idris Elba	Brixton Lore	Hindi	English	2019	2019	
Dolittle	Robert Downey Jr.	Dr. John Dolittle	Hindi	English	2020	2020	
Red Notice	Dwayne Johnson	John Hartley	Hindi	English	2021	2021	
Spider-Man: Far From Home	Robert Downey Jr.	Tony Stark	Hindi	English	2019	2019	

=== Animated films ===
Film title	Actor	Character	Dub Language	Original Language	Original Year Release	Dub Year Release	Notes
Shrek	Mike Myers	Shrek	Hindi	English	2001	2001	
Shrek 2	Mike Myers	Shrek	Hindi	English	2004	2004	
Shrek the Third	Mike Myers	Shrek	Hindi	English	2007	2007	
Shrek the Halls	Mike Myers	Shrek	Hindi	English	2007	2007	
Monsters vs. Aliens	Hugh Laurie	Dr. Cockroach	Hindi	English	2009	2009	
Ice Age: Dawn of the Dinosaurs	Simon Pegg	Buck	Hindi	English	2009	2009	
Shrek Forever After	Mike Myers	Shrek	Hindi	English	2010	2010	
Rio	Carlos Ponce	Marcel	Hindi	English	2011	2011	
The Adventures of Tintin	Daniel Craig	Ivan Ivanovitch Sakharine/Red Rackham	Hindi	English	2011	2011	
Ice Age: Continental Drift	Simon Pegg	Buck (cameo)	Hindi	English	2012	2012	
The Croods	Nicolas Cage	Grug Crood	Hindi	English	2013	2013	
Epic	Blake Anderson	Dagda	Hindi	English	2013	2013	
Turbo	Bill Hader	Guy Gagné	Hindi	English	2013	2013	
Rio 2	Miguel Ferrer	Big Boss	Hindi	English	2014	2014	

=== Television ===
Series title	Actor	Character	Dub Language	Original Language	Original Year Release	Dub Year Release	Notes
Money Heist	Pedro Alonso	Andrés de Fonollosa (Berlin)	Hindi	Spanish	2017–2021	2020-2021	Netflix series
The Sandman	David Thewlis	John Burgess / Johnny Dee / Doctor Destiny	Hindi	English	2022	2022	Netflix series

=== Other production staff ===
Live action films

Film title	Staff role	Dubbing Studio	Dub Language	Original Language	Original Year Release	Dub Year Release	Notes
Lion of the Desert	Writer	Sound & Vision India	Hindi	English	1981	2004	
Kung Fu Hustle	Writer	Sound & Vision India	Hindi	Cantonese Chinese	2004	2005	
Prince of Persia: The Sands of Time	Writer	Sound & Vision India	Hindi	English	2010	2010	He was also the Hindi dubbing voice for Richard Coyle's role as Tus and was the Narrator of the Hindi dub.
Salt	Writer	Sound & Vision India	Hindi	English	2010	2010	

== Awards and nominations ==
Year	Award	Category	Show	Result
2017	Lions Gold Awards	Best Actor In A Negative Role (Male)	Beyhadh	Won
2017	Indian Television Academy Awards	Best Actor In A Negative Role (Jury)	Beyhadh	Nominated
2019	Lions Gold Awards	Best Supporting Actor	Bepannah	Won
2019	Indian Telly Awards	Best Actor In Negative Role Male (Popular)	Bepannah	Won

== See also ==
- Dubbing (filmmaking)
- List of Indian Dubbing Artists
