= Ayodhya (2005 Tamil film) =

- Directed by: R. Jayaprakash
- Written by: R. Jayaprakash
- Produced by: R. Jayaprakash
- Starring: Mohankumar; Ramana; Rekha Unnikrishnan; Ragini Nandwani
- Cinematography: R. Selva
- Edited by: M. P. Ravichandran
- Music by: Sabesh–Murali
- Production company: Jayavilas Films
- Release date: 28 January 2005
- Running time: 125 minutes
- Country: India
- Language: Tamil

Ayodhya is a 2005 Indian Tamil-language romantic drama film written, produced and directed by R. Jayaprakash. The film stars newcomer Mohankumar, Ramana, Rekha Unnikrishnan and newcomer Ragini Nandwani, with Manivannan, J. Livingston, Charan Raj, Saranya Ponvannan, Seetha, Ilavarasu, Mayilsamy, Chitti Babu and Delhi Kumar playing supporting roles. It was released on 28 January 2005.

== Plot ==
Hussain Bhai and Sundaram Pillai were best friends in Ayodhyapuri near Nagercoil, a place where Hindus and Muslims lived in harmony. Hussain and Sundaram bought land to build a factory at that place. Hussain was married to Jameela, while Sundaram married Seetha under Hussain and Jameela's blessings. Jameela and Seetha then became pregnant. Jameela, who had suffered a miscarriage, feared to lose her baby. In the meantime, Sabapathy, who was a troublemaker, turned the friends into enemies for his own personal gain. This issue was taken by the villagers, and the village split into two with Muslims on one side and Hindus on the other side. Later, Seetha and Jameela gave birth in the same hospital the same day. Fearing that Jameela's baby may die, Seetha switched the babies in their cradles, but Jameela knew about it.

25 years later, the conflict intensified between Hussain and Sundaram, and they are in a legal fight over the factory with Sabapathy, continuing to add fuel to the conflict. Seetha and Jameela want their husbands to make peace. Hussain's son grows up as Shankar in Sundaram's house, whereas Sundaram's son grows up as Ameer in Hussain's house. Ameer falls in love with Shankar's cousin Anu, while Shankar falls in love with Ameer's relative Zarina. Thereafter, Ameer and Shankar become friends and decide to support their love. Sabapathy, who pulled strings to create conflicts between Muslims and Hindus, is ultimately killed. The film ends with Hussain and Sundaram making up after their quarrel, the lovers brought together, and Muslims and Hindus making peace.

== Cast ==
- Mohankumar as Ameer
- Ramana as Shankar
- Rekha Unnikrishnan as Anu
- Ragini Nandwani as Zarina
- Manivannan as Sabapathy
- J. Livingston as Hussain Bhai
- Charan Raj as Sundaram Pillai
- Saranya Ponvannan as Jameela
- Seetha as Seetha
- Ilavarasu as Vaiyapuri
- Mayilsamy as Guna
- Chitti Babu as Akbar
- Delhi Kumar as Jamal Bhai
- Bava Lakshmanan as Thevar
- Swaminathan
- Thamizhselvan
- Amutha Ganesan
- Sampathraj
- Sathya
- Besant Nagar Shankar
- Abhinayashree in a special appearance

== Production ==
This film marks the directorial debut of R. Jayaprakash, who previously worked as a co-producer for Love Channel (2001), and the acting debut of Mohankumar. Two songs were shot in Ireland.

== Soundtrack ==
The soundtrack was composed by the duo Sabesh–Murali.

Song	Singer(s)	Duration
"Sivakasi Thee Vizhikal"	Srinivas	6:01
"Orange"	Sujatha Mohan	6:01
"Markali Maasa"	Ranjith, Swapna Madhuri	5:40
"Kichili Kichilikka"	Karthik	5:02
"Bhagavane Enn Kadhal"	Sabesh, Chinmayi	5:11
"Aayiram Meena Enn Nenjai"	Harish Raghavendra	5:41

== Reception ==
Sify said, "Such ventures may pretend to be message films to spread communal harmony but they end up making a mockery of it". Malini Mannath of Chennai Online wrote that the director "takes up an old theme, which, combined with some lacklustre narration and uninspiring artistes, results in a product that undoubtedly is in the 'skip it' list", although Rekha's performance was a "saving grace".
