= Saagasam =

2016 Indian film by Arun Raj Varma

- Poster
- Directed by: Arun Raj Varma
- Screenplay by: Thiagarajan
- Story by: Trivikram Srinivas
- Based on: Julayi by Trivikram Srinivas
- Produced by: Haresh Vikram Vijayakumar; Thiagarajan; Shanthi Thiagarajan; Prashanth
- Starring: Prashanth; Amanda Rosario; Sonu Sood
- Cinematography: Shaji Kumar; Soundarrajan; Sakthi Saravanan
- Edited by: K. Sasi Kumar
- Music by: S. Thaman
- Production companies: Staar Movies; Lakshmi Shanthi Movies
- Distributed by: Sri Thenandal Films
- Release date: 5 February 2016
- Country: India
- Language: Tamil

Saagasam (transl. Adventure) is a 2016 Indian Tamil-language action comedy film directed by Arun Raj Varma and written and presented by Thiagarajan. The film stars Prashanth and Amanda Rosario, while an ensemble cast including Sonu Sood, Nassar, Thambi Ramaiah, Kota Srinivasa Rao, Abeetha and M. S. Bhaskar portray supporting roles. The music was composed by S. Thaman.

The film is a remake the 2012 Telugu film Julayi and was released on 5 February 2016. Few scenes involving Telugu actors were reused from the original.

== Plot ==
A master robber and thug named Bittu and a local MLA named Varatharajan plan to rob ₹15 billion (US$160 million) (₹1,500 crores) from a bank. Ravi Narayan believes in earning quick money rather than toiling like his father Narayana Murthy. During a chance meeting with Bittu, Ravi reveals his intention of making quick money by betting on an IPL match and discloses the location of the betting ring. However, the police raid the location, and Ravi is apprehended. During interrogation, Ravi deduces that Bittu has tipped off the cops to commit a crime and convinces ACP Rajamanickam. Bittu successfully robs the bank, and his brother Lala takes the money to the city's dumping yard.

However, the police catch Lala, who resists them, only to be killed by Ravi. Meanwhile, Bittu goes to the dumping yard to collect the money but is shocked as the dumping yard is burnt to ashes. Having his brother dead and the money burnt, Bittu decides to kill Ravi. Manickam sends Ravi to Coimbatore from Chennai under the Witness Protection Program and makes him stay at his friend DIG Sitaram's house. One day, Ravi happens to see Madhu, a middle-class girl who works with travel agent Murthy, an associate of Bittu. He prepares fake passports for Bittu's gang to help them escape from India. Ravi befriends Madhu, both fall in love with each other and the two find out about Bittu.

Bittu kills Rajamanickam by planting a bomb in his car and also attacks Ravi's family where his father gets hospitalised but recovers, which makes him realise his mistakes and also asks him to retrieve the money for the people, who toiled day and night for their family. Ravi finds that his sister Raji is kidnapped and also framed for Rajamanickam's murder when he unknowingly picked up a call which is a phone bomb activated in the car but is released with the help of DIG Sitaram. Ravi finds that Rajamanickam had faked his death as Bittu learned of Rajamanickam and Varatharajan's plan when he learns that they exchanged the money in the dumping yard into fake currencies which were burnt by them to let Bittu think that Ravi burnt the money.

Bittu kills Rajamanickam and Varatharajan and plans to escape from the country by having the money stored in a container and transporting it to a goods ship. Ravi, having deduced Bittu's plan fools the henchman and makes them return the money to the bank. The henchman gets killed by the mob, who were protesting at the bank. A showdown occurs between Ravi and Bittu where Ravi kills Bittu with Sitaram's help, exposes the stolen money and also saves Raji. The movie concludes with Ravi realizing the importance of hard work over any apparent short-term routes to success. In the end, Ravi attends an interview and gets selected for the job, in which he earns ₹25,000 (US$260).

== Cast ==
- Prashanth as Ravindra "Ravi" Narayana
- Amanda Rosario as Madhu
- Sonu Sood as Bittu (all scenes reused from Julayi)
- Nassar as Narayana Murthy, Ravi's father
- Thambi Ramaiah as ACP Seetharaman
- Bose Venkat as SP Santhanapandian
- Abeetha as Kavitha, Seetharaman's daughter
- Abi Saravanan as Kothandapani
- M. S. Bhaskar as Sadanandam
- Rao Ramesh as Commissioner Rajamanickam
- Brahmaji as "Travels" Murthy
- Tulasi as Kameshwari, Ravi's mother
- Madhan Bob as Madhu's father
- Hema as Madhu's stepmother
- Devadarshini as Lalitha, Seetharaman's wife
- John Vijay as "Chain" Jaipal
- Riyaz Khan as Bar Owner
- Leema Babu as Raji, Ravi's sister
- Swaminathan as Iyer
- 'Hello FM' Suresh as RJ Suresh
- Sai Prashanth as Ravindra's friend
- Robo Shankar as cafe guest (cameo appearance)
- Nalini as Neighbor
- Besant Ravi as Rowdy Shankar
- Selvi Subbaraj
- Indhu
- Sai Ram
- Nargis Fakhri as item girl in "Desi Girl"
- Zareen Khan in Special appearance "Desi Girl"
- Sandy

Scenes dubbed from Julayi

- Kota Srinivasa Rao as Varatharajan
- Shafi as Lala, Bittu's brother
- Ravi Prakash as Dhanushkodi
- Vamsi Krishna as Bittu's henchman
- Amit Tiwari as Bittu's henchman
- Sheetal Menon as Sheetal, Bittu's deaf-mute girlfriend
- Shravan as Sattar

== Production ==
Prashanth and his father, Thiagarajan scouted locations to make the film while on business trips to Kuwait and Australia. The team soon requested fans to name the film through a poll on Facebook, with the titles considered including Asthiram and Modhi Paar, before Saahasam was finalised. The film progressed through the end of 2013 with little media coverage, and the technical crew and cast remained unannounced. In early February 2014, it was announced that Arun Raj Varma was making his debut as a director while Sakthi Saravanan and Devi Sri Prasad would be cinematographer and music composer respectively. In a turn of events, Thaman replaced Devi Sri Prasad as composer, working on an original soundtrack.

The team re-began work after a break in late May 2014 and it was announced that Nargis Fakhri had signed on to appear in an item number. The song, composed by Thaman and written by Madhan Karky, was filmed in late July 2014 at Binny Mills, Chennai. Nargis Fakhri had flown from Hungary to be a part of the shoot, with Raju Sundaram choreographing the song also featuring hundred extras. Tamannaah was briefly linked as the female lead, before Australian model Amanda Rosario was chosen as the lead actress in the film. The team subsequently shot for the film in late 2014 and early 2015 in locations including Coimbatore, Chennai, Malaysia and Japan. A week prior to the film's release in February 2016, the film was retitled from Saahasam to Saagasam, with the tagline Enra Veerachayal, in order to recoup tax benefits.

== Soundtrack ==
Saahasam

Soundtrack album by S. Thaman
- Released: 18 September 2015
- Recorded: 2015
- Genre: Feature film soundtrack
- Length: 27:03
- Language: Tamil
- Labels: Prashanth Music; Divo; Junglee Music
- Producer: S. Thaman

S. Thaman chronology
Sakalakala Vallavan (2015)	Saahasam (2015)	Bruce Lee - The Fighter (2015)

In July 2014, the film's first song, described as a "bar number" featuring actress Nargis Fakhri in an item number, was recorded. Written by Madhan Karky, the song's original version was sung by actress Remya Nambeesan. In late October, a gaana song titled "Pudikkum Pudikkum" written by Kabilan was recorded with Shreya Ghoshal, who remarked that it was her first tryst with the "kuthu" genre. Impressed with his work in the album, producer Thiagarajan and Prashanth gifted Thaman, a Toyota Fortuner car on his birthday in November 2014. In early December 2014, the song written by Madhan Karky was recorded with the voice of actress Lakshmi Menon, replacing Remya Nambeesan's voice. The team initially approached Yo Yo Honey Singh to sing the male portions for the song, but his unavailability meant that Anirudh Ravichander instead recorded "Madhoo" for the album. Mohit Chauhan recorded a song titled "Penne Kutty Penne" in Mumbai in mid-December, while Shankar Mahadevan lent his vocals in the duet with Shreya Ghoshal. The team also announced that Arijit Singh and Andrea Jeremiah would work on the soundtrack which did not made it to the album, while a further track was recorded with Silambarasan in the final week of 2014.

Track listing
No.	Title	Lyrics	Singer(s)	Length
1.	"Angry Bird Penne"	Na. Muthukumar	Mohit Chauhan	4:39
2.	"Desi Girl"	Madhan Karky	Silambarasan, Lakshmi Menon	4:34
3.	"Madhu"	Na. Muthukumar	Anirudh Ravichander	4:52
4.	"O Madhu" (reprise)	Na. Muthukumar	Vijay Prakash	4:48
5.	"Pudikkum"	Kabilan	Shankar Mahadevan, Shreya Ghoshal	4:11
6.	"Sayang Ku"	Na. Muthukumar	M. M. Manasi, S. Thaman	3:59
Total length:				27:03

== Critical reception ==
M. Suganth of Times of India rated the film 2.5 out of 5 and wrote "Prashanth, making a return to the screen after quite a while, gives his best, but we can't help but feel that this required an even younger hero. But what lets the film down the most is that it is directed without any feel for the material, so we are unsure if we need to take the film seriously or as a spoof". Sify wrote "Overall, Saagasam might attract audiences who love Telugu commercial entertainers but for others, it’s just another average entertainer".
