= Phir Wahi Talash =

- Written by: Revati Saran Sharma
- Directed by: Lekh Tandon
- Starring: Poonam Rehani Sarin, Rakesh Kapoor, Neelima Azim, Rajesh Khattar, Ashwani Kumar, S M Zaheer
- Original language: Hindi
- No. of seasons: 1
- No. of episodes: 22

Original release
- Network: DD National
- Release: 1989 – 1990

Phir Wahi Talash is a television show by director Lekh Tandon broadcast on Doordarshan in 1989–1990.

The show's theme ghazal Mere humsafar mere saath tum, Kabhi haadson ki dagar mile kabhi mushkilon ka safar mile was popular. The ghazal 'Mere Humsafar mere Saath tum....' is sung by Shobhana Rao, a ghazal and light music singer in New Delhi, India.

== Synopsis ==
The show is a love story between Padma (Poonam Rehani Sarin), a wealthy girl, and Narendra (Ashwini Kumar), a poor boy studying for a BA degree. Ashwini's neighbour (Himani Shivpuri) likes Narendra, but Padma's strict father disapproves of the relationship and arranges her marriage to Sagar (Rakesh Kapoor). However, as Sagar is portrayed as a modern thinker, he lets his wife go to be with the man she loves.

== Cast ==
- Poonam Rehani Sarin as Padma
- Dr Ashwini Kumar as Narender
- Virendra Saxena as Narender's father
- Nutan Surya as Narender's mother
- Himani Shivpuri as Tara (Narender's neighbour)
- Rakesh Kapoor as Sagar
- Neelima Azeem as Shehnaz (Padma's friend)
- Rajesh Khattar as Captain Salim (Shehnaz's love interest)
- S M Zaheer as Shehnaz's father
- Sadia Dehlvi as Shehnaz's mother
- Arun Bali as Professor
- B.L. Chopra as Padma's father
- Veena Khanna as Padma's aunt
- Hemant Mishra as Madho (gardener)
- Gyan Shivpuri as Banwari
- Anil Bhatia as Satish (Narender's friend)
- Khalid as Aadil (Salim's brother)
- Anand Sharma as Girish (Sagar's father)
- Vinita Malik as Sagar's mother
