= Ek Baar Kaho =

- Poster
- Directed by: Lekh Tandon
- Written by: Rahi Masoom Reza (dialogue)
- Screenplay by: Madhusudan Kalelkar; Lekh Tandon
- Story by: Madhusudan Kalekar
- Produced by: Tarachand Barjatya; Rajshri Productions
- Starring: Navin Nischol; Shabana Azmi
- Cinematography: Jehangir Choudhary
- Edited by: Mukhtar Ahmed
- Music by: Bappi Lahiri
- Release date: 3 September 1980 (India)
- Country: India
- Language: Hindi

Ek Baar Kaho (transl. Say Once) is a 1980 Indian Hindi-language drama film produced by Tarachand Barjatya and directed by Lekh Tandon. The film stars Shabana Azmi and Navin Nischol in main roles. The climax is inspired from that of the 1957 movie An Affair to Remember.

== Plot ==
Ravi Varma loses his parents in childhood and his wife Rajni in an accident. He keeps himself immersed in business. His family physician advises him to take a holiday. He meets Aarti and both are attracted to each other. Ravi is hesitant at first to express his love because he believes whoever he loves will die. Later, he asks her to meet him and she agrees. When Aarti does not come to meet him, Ravi believes that she does not reciprocate his feelings.

He meets her two years later and in the climax finds out why she did not come to meet him. Its all's well that ends well!

== Cast ==
- Shabana Azmi as Aarti Mathur
- Navin Nischol as Ravi Varma
- Dilip Dhawan
- Kiran Vairale
- Suresh Oberoi as Suresh
- Anil Kapoor
- Madan Puri
- Rajendra Nath
- Jagdeep

== Soundtrack ==
All music is composed by Bappi Lahiri.

No.	Title	Lyrics	Singer(s)	Length
1.	"Char Din Ki Zindagi Hai"	Maya Govind	Yesudas	4:05
2.	"Ek Baar Kaho Mujhe Pyar Karte Ho"	Dev Kohli	Sulakshana Pandit, Bappi Lahiri	4:20
3.	"Raakh Ke Dher Ne"	Mohinder Dehelvi	Jagjit Singh	3:44
5.	"Yeh Zindagi Char Din Ki"	Kulwant Jani	Bappi Lahiri	4:40
7.	"Pyar Ki Raha Mein"		Aarti Mukherjee	1:20
8.	"Soye Jasbaat"		Aarti Mukherjee	1:10
