= Udanchhoo =

- Theatrical release poster
- Directed by: Vipin Parashar
- Written by: Vishal Kumar Patil; Vaibhav Bajpai
- Screenplay by: Vishal Kumar Patil
- Story by: Vishal Kumar Patil
- Produced by: Ravindra Singh
- Starring: Prem Chopra; Rajniesh Duggal; Ashutosh Rana; Lankesh Bhardwaj; Bruna Abdullah; Saisha Sehgal
- Music by: Avishek Majumder; Pravin-Manoj; Atharva Joshi
- Production company: R-Vision India Pvt.Ltd
- Distributed by: Rich Juniors Entertainment
- Release date: 5 January 2018
- Running time: 125 minutes
- Country: India
- Language: Hindi

Udanchhoo is a 2018 Indian Hindi-language comedy film directed by Vipin Parashar, and starring Prem Chopra, Rajneesh Duggal, Ashutosh Rana, Bruna Abdullah and Saisha Sehgal. Written by Vishal Kumar Patil and produced by Ravindra Singh under the banner of R-Vision India, this con-comedy is set in the metropolitan city of Mumbai, basing its narrative on how many of today's spiritual leaders use their influence to fool and misguide their followers and use them as a means for their black money operations.

== Story ==
The film revolves around the lead protagonists Vikram (Rajneesh Duggal), Guru G (Prem Chopra) and Shanti (Saisha Sehgal). Guru G, under the garb of a pious spiritual guru, is running a black money operation through his ashram with help from his trusted devotee Billu (Ashutosh Rana) and Julia (Bruna Abdullah). The film goes on to show how all the characters get involved in a huge con mystery resulting in a funny and dramatic climax. The story is by Vishal Kumar Patil.

== Cast ==
- Prem Chopra as Guru Ji
- Ashutosh Rana as Billu Kabootar
- Rajneesh Duggal as Vikram
- Bruna Abdullah as Julia
- Lankesh Bhardwaj as Balwinder
- Saisha Sehgal as Shanti
- Anil George as Dhanraj Singhania
- Brijendra Kala as Kal Bhairav (Lawyer)
- Amanda Rosario as Sarkar Item Girl

== Soundtrack ==
The music of the film is composed by Avishek Majumder, Pravin-Manoj and Atharva Joshi while the lyrics have been written by Rani Malik, Ajay Milind, Jairaj Selwan and Vishal Kumar Patil. The first track of the film is titled as "Sarkar" which is sung by Rani Hazarika, starring Amanda Rosario.

Track listing
No.	Title	Lyrics	Music	Singer(s)	Length
1.	"Udanchhoo"	Jairaj Selwan, Vishal Kumar Patil	Avishek Majumder	Nakash Aziz, Shalmali Kholgade
2.	"Bhulbhulaiya"		Avishek Majumder	Nakash Aziz, Shradha Pandit
3.	"Sarkar"	Ajay Milind	Pravin-Manoj	Rani Hazarika
4.	"Naughty Naughty"	Rani Malik	Pravin-Manoj	Ravindra Singh, Pratiksha Vashishtha
5.	"Money Money"	Rani Malik	Atharva Joshi	Divya Kumar

== Release and reception ==
The film was released on 5 January 2018. A Free Press Journal gave movie a 1.5 Rating Out of 5 and wrote "A clueless attempt at comedy."
