= Nagin Aur Lootere =

- Directed by: Mohan T Gehani
- Written by: Mahendra Delhvi
- Produced by: Mohan T Gehani
- Starring: Anupam Kher; Shakti Kapoor; Neelima Azeem; Kader Khan; Goga Kapoor
- Edited by: Rajan Mahajan
- Production company: Devi Films
- Release date: 1992
- Running time: 125 minutes
- Country: India
- Language: Hindi

Nagin Aur Lootere is a Hindi action fantasy film of Bollywood which was directed and produced by Mohan T. Gehani. This movie was released in 1992 in the banner of Devi Films.

== Plot ==
A married couple having no child, prayed to Snake God Nagraj. The lord Nagraj appears before them and grants their wish. A boy is born named Nagesh. Nagesh has grown up, and become a Police Inspector. One day a lady Rajni appears, meets Nagesh's mother and tells her that she was Nagesh's wife in previous birth. She is the daughter of Nagraj, who had told her that she could claim him as her husband after growing up. Fearing for the safety of Nagesh, his mother gets him married to another woman, Neelam, the daughter of a Priest. This incident now set for a confrontation between the Nilam and Rajni. But things change dramatically when Nagesh is photographed having an affair with a woman named Julie, who is subsequently murdered. Police find the connection of Nagesh to this murder; he is dismissed from the service Police and imprisoned. The court found him guilty and sentenced him to be hanged. Now both Nilam and Rajni come to know about the sentence and steps each will take to claim Nagesh as her own.

== Cast ==
- Shakti Kapoor as Tantrik
- Anant Mahadevan as Nagraj
- Anupam Kher as Police constable
- Neelima Azeem as Nilam
- Rajesh Khattar as Inspector Rahesh
- Rajesh Vivek as Chattan Singh
- Goga Kapoor as Bhujang Singh
- Kader Khan as Thief
- Jayabharathi as Rajni

== Music ==
1. " Aao Pyar Karein" - Udit Narayan, Kavita Krishnamurthy
2. "Hum Do Raahi Chor Sipaahi" - Sudesh Bhosle
3. "Main Hoon Naagin Aur Tum Ho Lutere" - Sadhana Sargam
4. "Sau Sau Janmon Wala" - Kumar Sanu, Sadhana Sargam
5. "Sun Sun Bhagwan" - Kavita Krishnamurthy
