= Pappu Can't Dance Saala =

- Promotional poster
- Directed by: Saurabh Shukla
- Written by: Saurabh Shukla
- Produced by: Ravindra Singh
- Starring: Vinay Pathak; Neha Dhupia
- Cinematography: Fuwad Khan
- Music by: Malhar
- Production company: R-Vision India Pvt. Ltd
- Release date: 16 December 2011
- Country: India
- Language: Hindi

Pappu Can't Dance Saala is a 2011 Indian romantic comedy film written and directed by Saurabh Shukla. The film stars Vinay Pathak and Neha Dhupia, whilst Rajat Kapoor, Naseeruddin Shah, Sanjay Mishra, and Saurabh Shukla play supporting roles. The film was released on 16 December 2011.

The title of the film is taken from a song of the same name from the film Jaane Tu... Ya Jaane Na (2008).

== Cast ==
- Vinay Pathak as Vidyadhar Acharya
- Neha Dhupia as Mehak Malvade
- Rajat Kapoor as music album director
- Naseeruddin Shah as Vidyadhar's father
- Sanjay Mishra as street food shop owner
- Saurabh Shukla as producer of dance album
- Brijendra Kala as Nagesh
- Anand Abhyankar as Mehak father

== Synopsis ==
The film revolves around a man Vidyadhar Acharya (Vinay Pathak), who moves to Mumbai from Varanasi, and finds it difficult to adjust to a place away from his city that's rich with cultural heritage.

Acharya rents a flat in an apartment only meant for sales tax employees. Every now and then, a vigilance raid occurs in the apartment, and then he has to hide in the terrace and stay there all night. Mehak Malavde (Neha Dhupia), a struggling dancer, moves in as his neighbor. The two neighbours regularly have fights. One night, there is another vigilance raid on the apartment. Mehak gets caught and gets thrown out of her flat. Vidya manages to escape since he came home late that night. Having nowhere to go, Mehak breaks into Vidya's apartment and plans to live there. Since Vidya hates her, it becomes impossible for him to stay with her, but she gives him no options.

Slowly, they start liking each other. One night, they both have a bad fight, and Vidya leaves his job and returns to his hometown. Mehak also moves out and starts living in a new flat. Slowly, they realize that they are missing each other and decide to unite by the end of the movie.

== Reception ==
The film opened to mixed reviews, although the performances of the lead cast were praised. At the box office, it recorded decent collections as it faced tough competition from other strong releases, such as The Dirty Picture which echibited a strong performance in its third week & Don 2.

== Soundtrack ==
Soundtrack for the film is scored by Malhar. Lyrics were penned By Amitabh Bhattacharya and Saurabh Shukla.

Track list
No.	Title	Singer(s)	Length
1.	"Zindagi"	Mohit Chauhan, Akruti Kakkar	5:22
2.	"Saajana"	Shreya Ghoshal	5:11
3.	"Abhiman Challa"	Kailash Kher	4:57
4.	"Lamha"	Sangeet Haldipur, Shilpa Rao	3:51
5.	"Haiya Haiya"	Manasi Scott	4:28
6.	"Dil-E-Nadaan"	Sangeet Haldipur	4:58
7.	"Jadoo"	Shilpa Rao	3:50
