= Agar Tum Na Hote =

- Directed by: Lekh Tandon
- Written by: Ramesh Pant
- Story by: N. N. Sharma
- Produced by: Rajeev Kumar; Vimal Kumar
- Starring: Rajesh Khanna; Rekha; Raj Babbar; Madan Puri; Asrani
- Cinematography: Pushpal Datta
- Edited by: Nand Kumar
- Music by: R D Burman; Gulshan Bawra (Lyrics)
- Production company: Shivam Chitrya
- Distributed by: Shemaroo Entertainment
- Release date: 4 November 1983
- Country: India
- Language: Hindi

Agar Tum Na Hote (lit. '"If You Were Not There"') is a 1983 Indian Bollywood drama film directed by Lekh Tandon and starring Rajesh Khanna, Rekha and Raj Babbar in leading roles. Lekh Tandon received the Best Director Award for this film from the Filmfans Association of India in 1983. The movie was a super hit completing the silver jubilee in many centres and was the third consecutive super hit in 1983 after Avatar and Souten. These movies heralded Rajesh Khanna's return to superstardom. In the same year, Khanna won a special award for excellence in acting for this movie at the Columbus International Film and Video Festival.

== Plot ==
Ashok Mehra (Rajesh Khanna), is a wealthy industrialist, whose business produces cosmetics. He is happily married to Purnima (Rekha). Purnima experiences complications after giving birth to their daughter Mini. The doctors are unable to save her. Ashok is devastated.

Several years pass. Ashok is unable to handle Mini's (Baby Shabana) pining for a mother's love. Mini's behaviour degrades severely, to the point that no school is willing to teach her, nor is any governess willing to deal with her. Ashok's business is unable to compete with foreign companies. Ashok hires photographer Raj Bedi (Raj Babbar) to run an advertising campaign. While scouting for a model at the beach Bedi stumbles upon Radha (also Rekha) and convinces her to pose for him. The two fall in love and get married. Bedi is now unwilling to give Radha's photos to Ashok. He sells his personal possessions and pays the price of backing out of the contract. Bedi's reputation is ruined and his career takes a nosedive. As he rebuilds a modest life for them Bedi suffers a crippling fall. Radha decides to take up a job to run the house and save for her husband's treatment, but no one is willing to hire a married woman. She decides to lie about her marital status. Her job search leads her to Ashok Mehra's office, where his associates are looking for a governess for Mini. She is offered the position instantly based on her uncanny resemblance to the late Purnima Mehra, although this fact is hidden from her.

Mini is difficult at first but thaws gradually. Unaware that Radha is married Ashok falls in love with her. A bedridden Bedi begins to suspect his wife's marital integrity. Ashok's attempts to grow closer to Radha, and Bedi's nosy friend Chandu (Asrani) only serve to add to his suspicions. After a heated confrontation with both Ashok and Bedi, Radha decides to stop being Mini's governess. Ashok is unable to handle Mini's tantrums and sends her to a hostel. Ashok feels guilty for judging Radha as selfish and epriving his daughter of. amother's love. When a lottery ticket purchased by Radha wins the jackpot, Ashok sends his associate to deliver the prize money to Radha who arranges for Bedi to be treated in the USA. All misconceptsion between the three are cleared when Ashok visits them at the airport. Ashok takes advantage of a delay in the flight to arrange for Mini to be adopted by Radha and Bedi The last line of the movie is delivered painfully by Ashok Mehra, directed at both Rekha's characters: "I loved you once, but lost you twice."

== Cast ==
- Rajesh Khanna as Ashok Mehra
- Rekha as Purnima Mehra/Radha Bedi
- Raj Babbar as Raj Bedi
- Baby Shabana as Mini Mehra
- Madan Puri as Shakur Ahmed
- Asrani as Chandu
- Krishna Kant Singh Bundela as Pandit ji

== Awards ==
31st Filmfare Awards:

Won

- Best Male Playback Singer – Kishore Kumar for "Agar Tum Na Hote"

Nominated

- Best Supporting Actor – Raj Babbar
- Best Lyricist – Gulshan Bawra for "Agar Tum Na Hote"
- In 1983 Rajesh Khanna won a special award for excellence in acting for this movie at Columbus International Film and Video Festival.[1]

== Music ==
Music was composed by Rahul Dev Burman and lyrics were written by Gulshan Bawra. Kishore Kumar won his 6th Filmfare Best Male Playback Award for the song "Agar Tum Na Hote".

- "Agar Tum Na Hote" – Kishore Kumar
- "Agar Tum Na Hote - Sad" - Kishore Kumar
- "Sach Hai Yeh Koi" – Kishore Kumar
- "Agar Tum Na Hote" – Lata Mangeshkar
- "Dheere Dheere Zara Zara" – Asha Bhosle
- "Hum To Hai Chhui Mui" – Lata Mangeshkar
- "Kal To Sunday Ki Chhuti" – Shailendra Singh, Rekha
