= Nakshatra (film) =

- Promotional poster
- Directed by: Mohan Savalkar
- Written by: Mohan Savalkar
- Produced by: Ravindra Singh
- Starring: Shubh; Sabina Sheema; Milind Soman; Anupam Kher; Rozza Catalano; Anant Jog; Gajendra Chauhan; Suhas Khandke; Mahrru Shaikh; Suresh Chatwal
- Cinematography: Roopang Aacharya
- Edited by: Sanjay Sankla
- Music by: Dj Sheizwood; Sameer Sen; Harry Anand
- Production company: R Vision
- Release date: 29 October 2010
- Country: India
- Language: Hindi

Nakshatra (transl. Star) is a Hindi language thriller film, directed by Mohan Savalkar and produced by Ravindra Singh. The film was released on 29 October 2010 under the R Vision banner.

== Synopsis ==
Despite high security, when a priceless diamond is stolen, the prime suspect is an aspiring screenwriter named Ajay. While writing his latest film script for some shady producers, Ajay cracks the secret password for the security system. Hot on his trail is a police officer who will go to any lengths to determine if Ajay is guilty or innocent.

== Plot ==
After his parents' demise in Delhi, aspiring scriptwriter Ajay lives in Mumbai with his parents' good friends and their daughter Jia with whom he is in love. The family is on good terms with industrialist and socialite Sharad. Ajay is frustrated as he is not able to get any good offers for his work. Luck knocks on Ajay's door when one day Sharad tells him that a group of filmmakers are interested in his work. Ajay devises an impressive script based upon the idea of a robbery given to him by the four producers - Nihal, Neha and sells it to them. Pleased with his success, Jiya agrees to marry Ajay.

Call it fortune or coincidence, Ajay's plot of the robbery matches with that of a real one in the city. He even manages to crack the Real password to the system that guards an expensive necklace called "Nakshatra" in the city museum. The Nakshatra is stolen, and the blame falls on Ajay, as the police receive information and think that he is the mastermind behind it. He gets arrested on the day of his engagement by investigating crime branch officer Gupte (Milind Soman).

On the way to the station, the police van is attacked by goons, and Ajay is set free by unknown people. Ajay is now on the run. He lands up in a farm house with a kind old vet, who takes care of him for a while, and then he proceeds incognito to the city to prove his innocence. Gupte is convinced that Ajay is the robber as he has escaped from cops, and goes about investigating the case and catch him.

Now Ajay tries to find the producers who hatched the plot n the first place. He manages to locate them but unfortunately someone would be following Ajay's steps and kills each of the four before he can get them to talk.

== Cast ==
- Shubh Mukherjee as Ajay Kapoor
- Sabina Sheema as Jiya Khanna
- Milind Soman as Inspector Gupte
- Anupam Kher as Sharad Desai
- Anant Jog as Commissioner
- Gajendra Chauhan as Museum Director
- Suresh Chatwal as Director
- Suhas Khandke as Col Khanna, Jiya's father
- Mahrru Shaikh as Jiya's mother
- Roshni Shetty as Astha
- Mamta Dutta as Niharika
- Jhuma Biswas as veterinary doctor

== Soundtrack ==
The Music Was Composed By Sameer Sen, Harry Anand, Dj Sheizwood and Released by Shemaroo Entertainment Audio.

Nakshatra

Soundtrack album by Sameer Sen Harry Anand Dj Sheizwood
- Released: 2010
- Recorded: 2010
- Genre: Soundtrack
- Length: 20:40
- Label: Shemaroo Entertainment Audio
- Producer: Sameer Sen; Harry Anand; Dj Sheizwood

Track list
No.	Title	Lyrics	Music	Singer(s)	Length
1.	"Dil Tujhe Pukare Pukare"	Nawab Arzoo	Sameer Sen	Taraannum Mallik	3:37
2.	"Jab Ishq Chingari Lag Jaye"	Harry Anand	Harry Anand	Kalpana Chauhan	4:22
3.	"Nakshatra"	Harry Anand, Rani Malik, Nawab Arzoo	Dj Sheizwood	Kalpana Chauhan, Taraannum Mallik, Sonu Kakkar	4:35
4.	"Yeh Vaada"	Rani Malik	DJ Sheizwood	Ravindra Singh, Ujwala Jadhav	4:29
5.	"Jab Ishq Chingari Lag Jaye (Remix)"	Harry Anand	Harry Anand	Kalpana Chauhan	3:37
Total length:					20:40
