= Neelima Azeem =

Indian actress

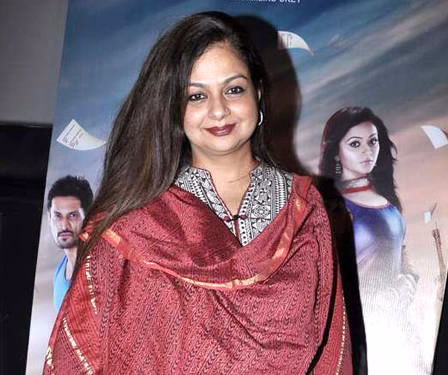
- Azeem in 2013
- Born: 2 December 1958 (age 67); Patna, Bihar, India
- Occupation: Actress
- Years active: 1989–present
- Spouses: Pankaj Kapur (m. 1979; div. 1984); Rajesh Khattar (m. 1990; div. 2001); Raza Ali Khan (m. 2004; div. 2009)
- Children: Shahid Kapoor; Ishaan Khatter

Neelima Azeem (born 2 December 1958) is an Indian actress, classical dancer and writer who works in Bollywood. She is the mother of actors Shahid Kapoor (from her marriage to actor Pankaj Kapur) and Ishaan Khatter (from her marriage to actor Rajesh Khattar). She is known in India for her roles in television shows.

== Early life ==
Neelima Azeem's father was Anwar Azeem, a journalist and Urdu author from Bihar, and her mother, Khadija, was a relative of Khwaja Ahmad Abbas. Azeem studied the Kathak form of Indian classical dance and was trained under Birju Maharaj and Munna Shukla.

== Career ==
Azeem appears in both Hindi-language movies and in television series, she also did many historical and drama movies, Phir Wahi Talash, Amrapali, The Sword of Tipu Sultan and Junoon. In 2014, she performed at the PanchTatva annual Kathak festival organized by Birju Maharaj's Kalashram at Bhartiya Vidya Bhavan Campus in Mumbai. She also worked in the Hindi film Sadak opposite Deepak Tijori.

== Personal life ==
She married Pankaj Kapur in the year 1979 but they later divorced. Their son Shahid Kapoor is a Bollywood actor. She later married Rajesh Khattar and had a son Ishaan Khatter, who is also a Bollywood actor.

== Filmography ==
=== Films ===
Year	Film	Role	Notes
2025	Saale Aashiq	Gendhi Rewal	
2018	The Illegal	Mummy	
2018	Blackmail	Dolly's mother	
2017	Sthir	Guru of Belarusian girl learning Kathak	Short film Screened at the 2017 Berlin Short Film Festival
2017	Majaz- Ae Gham-e-Dil Kya Karun	Nabi	
2016	Alif	Zahara	Premièred in the Indian International Film Festival of Queensland
2013	Dehraadun Diary	Mrs Thakur, Vishesh's mother	
2012	Future To Bright Hai Ji	Romila Motwani	
2008	Yaari Mere Yaar Ki		
2007	Just Married	Ritika's Aunty	
2003	Ishq Vishk	Mrs. Mathur, Rajiv's mother	
2003	Hum Hai Pyar Mein		
2000	Kaala Mandir		
1999	Sooryavansham	Amitabh Bachchan's daughter-in-law	
1997	Itihaas	Naveli	
1996	Hahakar	Ragini	
1996	Chhota Sa Ghar	Agni	
1994	Aaja Re O Sajna		
1993	Dil Apna Preet Parai	Neelima	
1992	Karm Yodha	Sameer's sister	
1992	Nagin Aur Lootere	Neelam	
1991	Sadak	Chanda	
1990	Salim Langde Pe Mat Ro	Mumtaz	

=== Television ===
Year	Show	Character	Channel	Notes
2010	Dhoondh Legi Manzil Humein		STAR One	
2007	Aek Chabhi Hai Padoss Mein	Devyani	Star Plus	
2007	Dhoom Machaao Dhoom		Disney Channel India	
2003	Kashmeer	Munira Bhatt	Star Plus	
2002	Amrapali		Doordarshan	
1998	Saans	Ajit's estranged wife	Star Plus	
1996	Hina			
1994	Did Not work in Shanti	No role called 'Iravati'	DD National	
1994	Junoon		Doordarshan	
1993	Zameen Aasmaan		Doordarshan	
1993	Bible Ki Kahaniyan	Rebecca	DD National	
1992	Talaash		Doordarshan	
1990	The Sword of Tipu Sultan	Mumtaz	DD National	
1990	Titli	Shalini	Doordarshan	Tele film
1989	Phir Wahi Talash	Shehnaz	Doordarshan	

=== Web series ===
Year	Title	Role	Platform	Notes
2019	Mom & Co.	Suhasini Joshi	The Zoom Studios	
2019	Halala		Ullu (on-demand streaming platform)	
