= Jahan Pyar Miley =

- Poster
- Directed by: Lekh Tandon
- Produced by: Lekh Tandon
- Starring: Shashi Kapoor; Hema Malini; Nadira
- Music by: Shankar–Jaikishan
- Release date: 30 October 1970
- Country: India
- Language: Hindi

Jahan Pyar Miley (transl. Where there is love) is a 1970 Hindi-language film directed by Lekh Tandon. The film stars Shashi Kapoor and Hema Malini. The film's music is by Shankar Jaikishan. Sharda won the 1970 Filmfare Best Female Playback Award for the song "Baat Zara Hai Aapas Ki". The reviewer for the Indian Express noted: "The highlights of the film are Shashi Kapoor poking fun at love-making in Hindi films and the film trying to justify the situations for the songs."

== Cast ==
- Shashi Kapoor
- Hema Malini
- Nadira
- Jeevan
- Nasir Hussain
- Helen
- Zeb Rehman
- Kumari Naaz
- Anjali Kadam
- Iftekhar

== Soundtrack ==
Song	Singer
"Ae Jaan-E-Bahara"	Mohammed Rafi
"Baat Zara Hai Aapas Ki"	Sharda
"Jahan Pyar Miley"	Mohammed Rafi
"Jahan Pyar Miley"	Suman Kalyanpur
"Dil Hai Ke Dhadakta"	Mohammed Rafi
"Nas Nas Mein Agan"	Lata Mangeshkar
