= Rohit Bakshi (actor) =

Indian television actor

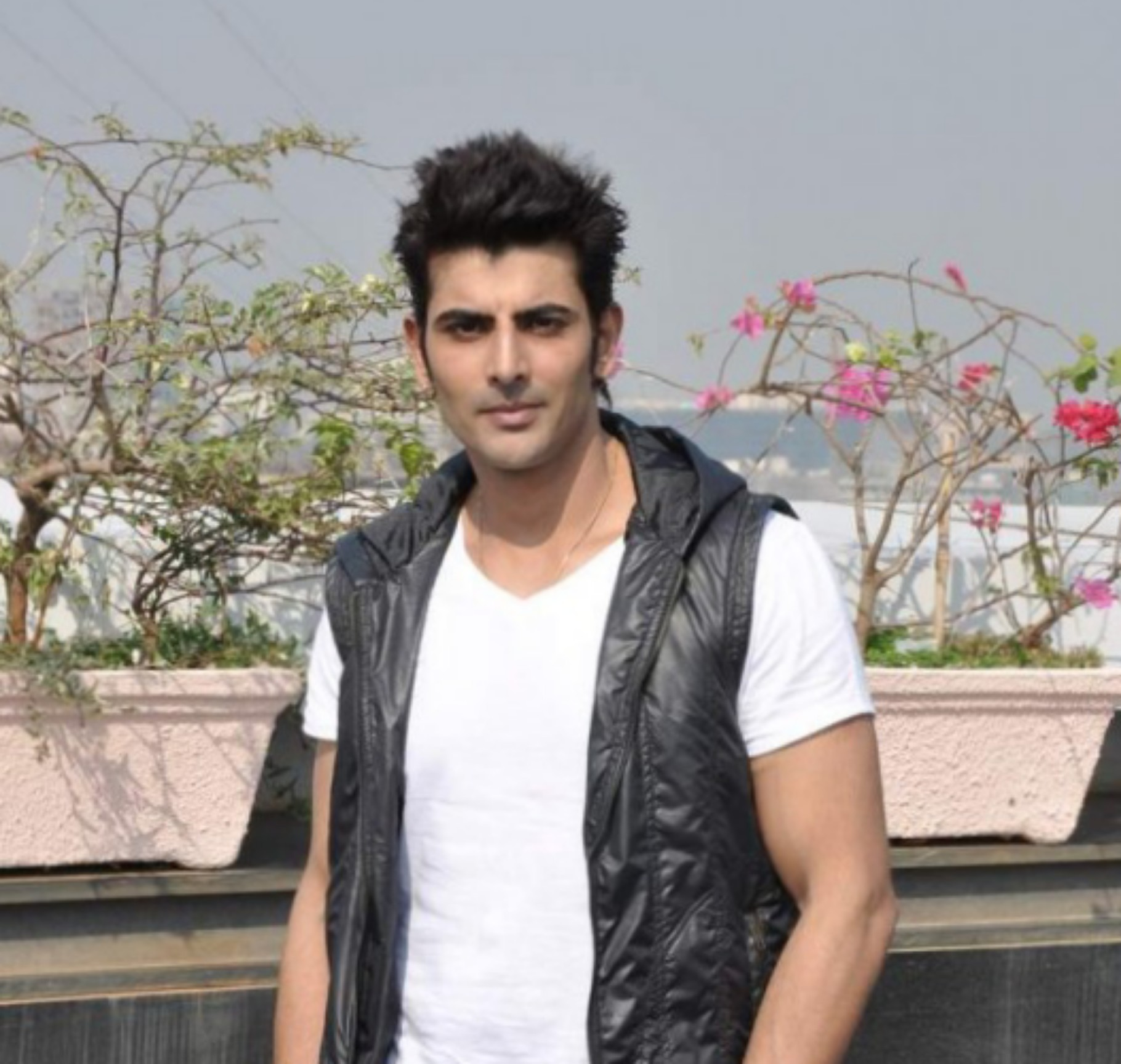
- Bakshi at the promotional event of Dehraadun Diary in 2013
- Occupations: Actor; model
- Years active: 2000–present

Rohit Bakshi is an Indian television actor. He played the role of Vishal Mehra in Ekta Kapoor's flagship soap opera Kyunki Saas Bhi Kabhi Bahu Thi and Piyush Raheja in Balaji Telefilms' soap opera Kahiin To Hoga, as well as a double role in the supernatural TV series Maharakshak: Devi, which was telecast on Zee TV.

In 2013, he made his Bollywood debut with the thriller film Dehraadun Diary. He also played Shiva in Siya Ke Ram and was last seen in Anupamaa as Ankush Kapadia.

== Personal life ==
Bakshi hails from Delhi. He dated actress Aashka Goradia from 2006 to 2016.

== Filmography ==
=== Films ===
Year	Title	Role	Ref.
2013	Dehraadun Diary	Anshul Sharma	

=== Television ===
Year	Serial	Role	Notes
2000	Choodiyan		
2000–2001	Tanhaiyaan		
2000–2001	Sukanya		
2002	Kutumb	Vikram	
2002–2004	Kyunki Saas Bhi Kabhi Bahu Thi	Vishal Mehra	
2003	Kya Hadsaa Kya Haqeeqat – Kabzaa	Bobby	
2003–2004	Kahiin To Hoga	Piyush Raheja	
2006–2007	Kahiin To Hoga	Abhishek Raheja	
2004	Lavanya	Nikhil	
2005; 2006	Sinndoor Tere Naam Ka	Suraj	
2005–2007	Kahaani Ghar Ghar Kii	Shikhar Mehra	
2006	Jassi Jaissi Koi Nahin	Rahul	
2006	Akela		
2006–2007	Kaajjal	Karan Pratapsingh	
2007	Kumkum – Ek Pyara Sa Bandhan	Sanjay	
2007–2008	Mere Apne	Vikram	
2009	Chittod Ki Rani Padmini Ka Johur	Maharaj Rawal Ratan Singh	
2012	Arjun		Cameo
2013	SuperCops Vs SuperVillains	Danny	
2013	Savdhaan India	Inspector Vinay Barua (Episode 460)	
2013	Fear Files	Tamas (Episode 116)	Episodic role
2015	Maharakshak: Devi	Brihaspati / Professor Jayant	
2016	Siya Ke Ram	Bhagwan Shiv	
2016	Darr Sabko Lagta Hai	Shikhar (Episode 27)	Episodic Rile
2016	Bharatvarsh	Chandragupta Maurya (Episode 2)	Episodic Rile
2017	Mahakali – Anth Hi Aarambh Hai	Kamadeva / Bhandasura	
2017–2018	Shaktipeeth ke Bhairav	Bhagwan Shiv	
2018	Shaktipeeth ke Bhairav	Bhairav	
2019	Main Bhi Ardhangini	Vikrant	
2022–2023; 2024	Anupamaa	Ankush Kapadia	
